= Vic Preston Jr =

Kenyan rally driver (1950–2022)

Personal information
- Nationality: (Kenya) Kenyan
- Born: 20 November 1950
- Died: 15 March 2022 (aged 71); Seychelles

World Rally Championship record
- Years active: 1973–1980, 1983–1990
- Co-driver: (United Kingdom) Bev Smith (United Kingdom) Paul White (United Kingdom) Roger Barnard (Kenya) John Lyall (Kenya) Mike Doughty (Sweden) Claes Billstam
- Teams: Ford, Porsche, Mercedes, Audi, Lancia, Nissan
- Rallies: 21
- Rally wins: 0
- Podiums: 3
- Total points: 42
- First rally: 1973 Safari Rally
- Last rally: 1990 Safari Rally

Vic Preston Jr (20 November 1950 – 15 March 2022) was a former rally driver from Kenya. His career spanned from 1966 to 1990.

Safari Rally icon Vic Preston Jr. was among Kenya’s most distinguished rally drivers. Although he never claimed victory in his home event, the legendary Safari Rally, he twice captured the Kenyan National Rally Championship title.

Born in 1950, Vic Jr. came from one of Kenya’s most celebrated rallying families — the Preston family — who operated the well-known Vic Preston Shell Petrol Station along University Way in Nairobi and served as Kenya’s Kawasaki importer. His father, Vic Preston Sr., was himself a rally legend, having won the East African Coronation Safari (later renamed the Safari Rally) in 1954 and 1955.

Vic Jr.’s passion for motorsport began early. As a teenager, he raced Kawasaki motorcycles on the Nairobi and Nakuru tracks before transitioning to rallying. At just 16 years old, he made his debut in the 1966 East African Safari Rally, driving a Ford Cortina alongside co-driver Robert Gerrish, finishing 80th overall.

Over the next 25 years, Vic Preston Jr. became one of Kenya’s most respected professional rally drivers, competing for several top factory teams including Lancia, Ford, Mercedes-Benz, Porsche, Audi, and Nissan. He took part in 18 editions of the Safari Rally, achieving his best result — second overall — in 1978 with co-driver John Lyall in a Porsche 911. He also secured third-place finishes in 1972 and 1980.

While the Safari Rally remained his primary stage, Vic Jr. also competed internationally — in England, Australia, Greece, and Côte d’Ivoire. One of his notable overseas performances came in 1985, when he finished fourth overall in the Rally Costa Smeralda (Sardinia, Italy), driving a works Martini Lancia Rallye 037 again with John Lyall.

His rally career came to a close in 1990, after he retired from the Marlboro Safari Rally due to suspension failure in his Nissan 200SX.

Vic Preston Jr. passed away on Tuesday night, 15 March 2022, in Seychelles, following complications from pneumonia. He was 71 years old.

== Racing record ==
=== Complete IMC results ===
Year	Entrant	Car	1	2	3	4	5	6	7	8	9
1971	East African Standard	Ford Escort Twin Cam	MON	SWE	ITA	KEN; 6	MAR	AUT	GRE	FRA	GBR
1972	Ford Motor Company Ltd	Ford Escort RS1600	MON	SWE	KEN; 3	MAR	GRE	AUT	ITA	USA	GBR

=== Complete WRC results ===
Year	Entrant	Car	1	2	3	4	5	6	7	8	9	10	11	12	13	WDC	Pts
1973	Ford Motor Company Ltd	Ford Escort RS1600	MON	SWE	POR	KEN; 14	MOR	GRE	POL	FIN	AUT	ITA	USA	GBR; Ret	FRA	N/A	N/A
1974	Vic Preston Service Station	Ford Escort RS1600	POR	KEN; 9	FIN	ITA	CAN	USA	GBR	FRA						N/A	N/A
1975	Vic Preston Jr	Lancia Stratos HF	MON	SWE	KEN; 11	GRE	MOR	POR	FIN	ITA	FRA	GBR				N/A	N/A
1976	Vic Preston Jr	Lancia Stratos HF	MON	SWE	POR	KEN; 12	GRC	MOR	FIN	ITA	FRA	GBR				N/A	N/A
1977	Ford Motor Company Ltd	Ford Escort RS1800	MON	SWE	POR	KEN; Ret	NZL	GRC	FIN	CAN	ITA	FRA	GBR			N/A	N/A
1978	Martini Racing	Porsche 911 SC	MON	SWE	KEN; 2	POR	GRE	FIN	CAN	ITA	CIV	FRA				N/A	N/A
1978	Vic Preston Jr	Ford Escort RS2000	MON	SWE	KEN	POR	GRE	FIN	CAN	ITA	CIV	FRA	GBR; 3			N/A	N/A
1979	D.T. Dobie / Daimler-Benz	Mercedes-Benz 450 SLC	MON	SWE	POR	KEN; Ret	GRE	NZL	FIN	CAN	ITA	FRA	GBR			22nd	10
1979	Vic Preston Jr	Mercedes-Benz 450 SLC												CIV; 4		22nd	10
1980	D.T. Dobie / Daimler-Benz	Mercedes-Benz 450 SLC	MON	SWE	POR	KEN; 3										13th	20
1980	Daimler-Benz	Mercedes-Benz 450 SLC					GRC; 14	ARG	FIN	NZL	ITA	FRA	GBR			13th	20
1980	SEACI	Mercedes-Benz 500 SLC												CIV; 5		13th	20
1983	Audi Sport	Audi Quattro A1	MON	SWE	POR	KEN; Ret	FRA	GRC	NZL	ARG	FIN	ITA	CIV	GBR		NC	0
1984	Martini Racing	Lancia Rally 037	MON	SWE	POR	KEN; 6	FRA	GRC	NZL	ARG	FIN	ITA	CIV	GBR		30th	6
1985	Martini Racing	Lancia Rally 037	MON	SWE	POR	KEN; Ret	FRA	GRC	NZL	ARG	FIN	ITA	CIV	GBR		NC	0
1986	Martini Lancia	Lancia Rally 037	MON	SWE	POR	KEN; Ret	FRA	GRE	NZL	ARG	FIN	CIV	ITA	GBR	USA	NC	0
1987	Martini Lancia	Lancia Delta HF 4WD	MON	SWE	POR	KEN; 14	FRA	GRE	USA	NZL	ARG	FIN	CIV	ITA	GBR	NC	0
1988	Martini Lancia	Lancia Delta Integrale	MON	SWE	POR	KEN; Ret	FRA	GRC	USA	NZL	ARG	FIN	CIV	ITA	GBR	NC	0
1989	Nissan Motorsport International	Nissan 200SX	SWE	MON	POR	KEN; 6	FRA	GRC	NZL	ARG	FIN	AUS	ITA	CIV	GBR	42nd	6
1990	Nissan Motorsport International	Nissan 200SX	MON	POR	KEN; Ret	FRA	GRC	NZL	ARG	FIN	AUS	ITA	CIV	GBR		NC	0

- Website FIA World Rally Championship, page https://www.wrc.com/en/news/2022/wrc/obituary-vic-preston-junior/ .
- Website The Standard, article "The immortals: The Vic Prestons were mad about motor sports", page https://www.standardmedia.co.ke/entertainment/nainotepad/2000224576/the-immortals-the-vic-prestons-were-mad-about-motor-sports .
- Website The Standard, article "Rally icon Vic Preston Junior dies at 72", page https://www.standardmedia.co.ke/sports/motorsport/2001440490/rally-icon-vic-preston-junior-dies-at-72 [M1].
- Website eWRC-Result.com by Tomáš "Shacki" Wanka, page https://www.ewrc-results.com/profile/9724-vic-preston-jr/ .
- Website Dirtfish.com, page https://dirtfish.com/rally/wrc/obituary-safari-rally-star-vic-preston-jr/ .
- Website Nation Africa, article "Safari Rally icon Vic Preston Junior dies at 72" by Abdul Sidi, page https://nation.africa/kenya/sports/motorsports/safari-rally-icon-vic-preston-junior-dies-at-72-3749896 .
- Website AUTOSPORT → Forums → The Nostalgia Forum, thread "Gone, but not forgotten...", posting by "Tim Murray", page https://forums.autosport.com/topic/189815-gone-but-not-forgotten-reloaded/page-16#entry9813892 citing [M1].
- Website Citizen Digital, article "Safari Rally Great Vic Preston Junior Dies Aged 72" by Alex Kinyua, page https://www.citizen.digital/sports/safari-rally-great-vic-preston-junior-dies-aged-72-n294712 .

- Website FIA World Rally Championship, page https://www.wrc.com/en/news/2022/wrc/obituary-vic-preston-junior/ .
- Website The Standard, article "The immortals: The Vic Prestons were mad about motor sports", page https://www.standardmedia.co.ke/entertainment/nainotepad/2000224576/the-immortals-the-vic-prestons-were-mad-about-motor-sports .
- Website The Standard, article "Rally icon Vic Preston Junior dies at 72", page https://www.standardmedia.co.ke/sports/motorsport/2001440490/rally-icon-vic-preston-junior-dies-at-72 [M1].
- Website eWRC-Result.com by Tomáš "Shacki" Wanka, page https://www.ewrc-results.com/profile/9724-vic-preston-jr/ .
- Website Dirtfish.com, page https://dirtfish.com/rally/wrc/obituary-safari-rally-star-vic-preston-jr/ .
- Website Nation Africa, article "Safari Rally icon Vic Preston Junior dies at 72" by Abdul Sidi, page https://nation.africa/kenya/sports/motorsports/safari-rally-icon-vic-preston-junior-dies-at-72-3749896 .
- Website AUTOSPORT → Forums → The Nostalgia Forum, thread "Gone, but not forgotten...", posting by "Tim Murray", page https://forums.autosport.com/topic/189815-gone-but-not-forgotten-reloaded/page-16#entry9813892 citing [M1].
- Website Citizen Digital, article "Safari Rally Great Vic Preston Junior Dies Aged 72" by Alex Kinyua, page https://www.citizen.digital/sports/safari-rally-great-vic-preston-junior-dies-aged-72-n294712 .
