= Bruno Saby =

French rally driver (born 1949)

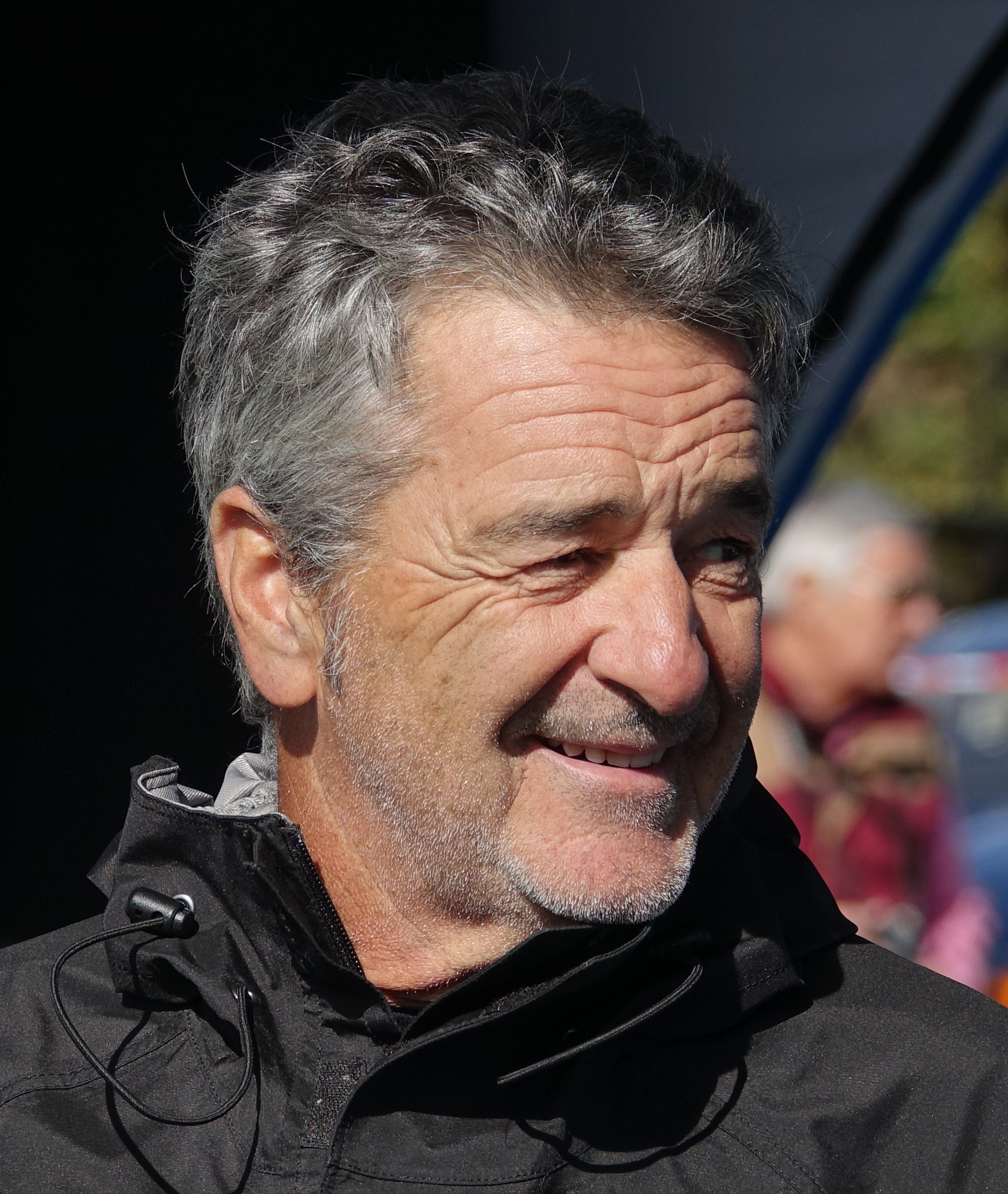
- Saby in 2018

Personal information
- Nationality: (France) French
- Born: 23 February 1949 (age 77); Grenoble

World Rally Championship record
- Years active: 1973–1974, 1976, 1978–1991
- Co-driver: (France) Jacques Penon (France) Jean-Christian Court-Payen (France) Michel Guégan (France) Daniel le Saux (France) Jean-Marc Andrié (Monaco) "Tilber" (France) Françoise Sappey (United Kingdom) Chris Williams (France) Jean-François Fauchille (France) Daniel Grataloup
- Teams: Renault, Peugeot, Lancia
- Rallies: 42
- Championships: 0
- Rally wins: 2
- Podiums: 7
- Stage wins: 58
- Total points: 192
- First rally: 1973 Monte Carlo Rally
- First win: 1986 Tour de Corse
- Last win: 1988 Monte Carlo Rally
- Last rally: 1991 RAC Rally

Bruno Saby (born 23 February 1949 in Grenoble) is a rally driver from France.

== Career ==
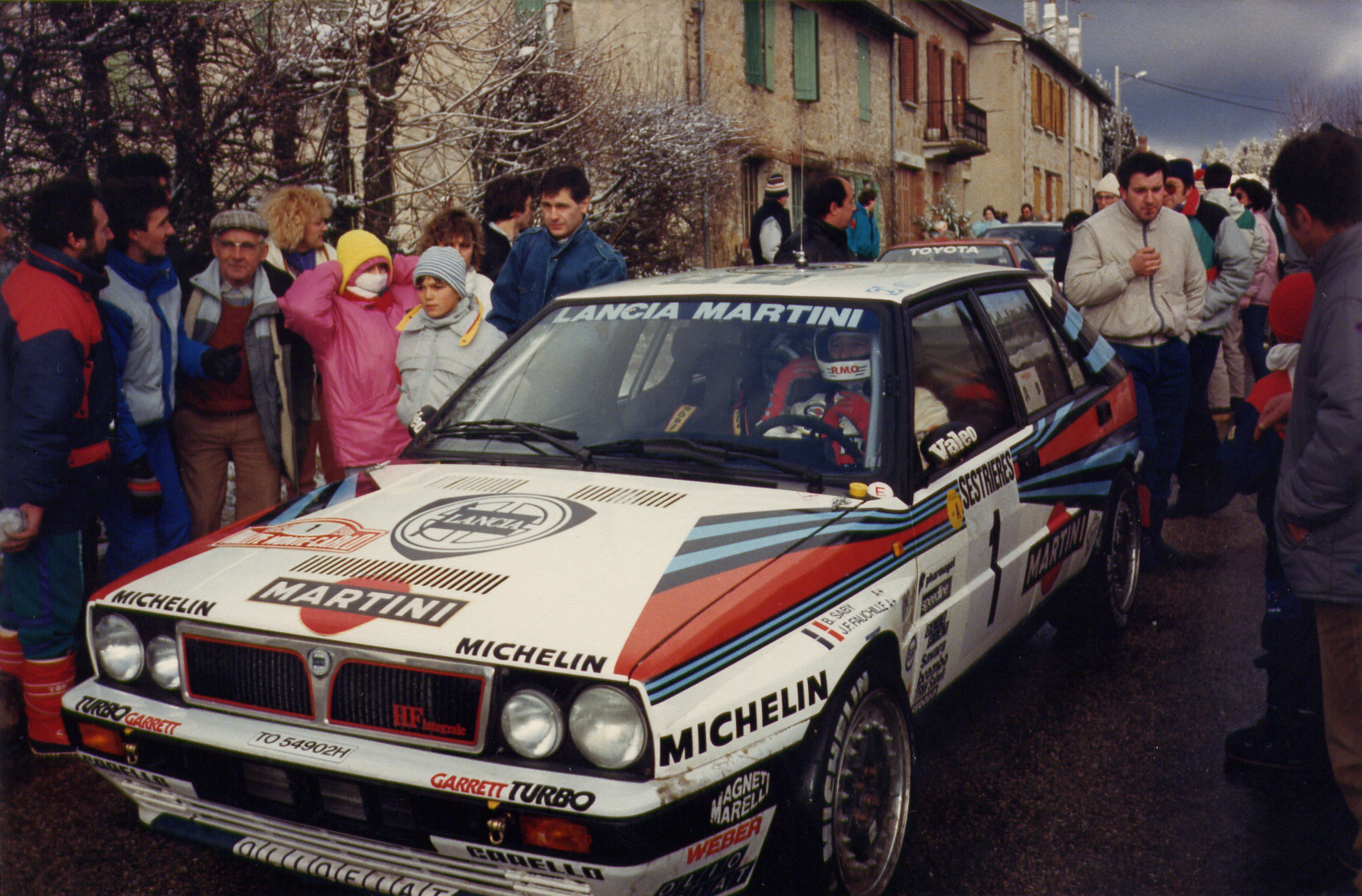
Saby in his Lancia Delta HF at the 1989 Monte Carlo Rally

In 1981, Saby became French Rally Champion in a Renault 5 Turbo. He drove for the works teams of Renault, Peugeot, Volkswagen and Lancia during his career in the World Rally Championship. He took two World Rally Championship wins in his career—his first, driving a Peugeot 205 Turbo 16 E2, was in the 1986 Tour de Corse, in which Henri Toivonen and his co-driver Sergio Cresto died. His only other win was with Lancia in the 1988 Monte Carlo Rally.

In 1978, Saby claimed the French Rallycross Championship title with an Alpine A110 1600. In the 1988 French Rallycross Championship, he drove a Lancia Delta S4 to become the runner-up to Champion Guy Fréquelin, who drove a Peugeot 205 Turbo 16 Evo 2.

Saby participated from 1992 to 2008 in cross country rallye and in the Dakar Rally, which he won in 1993 while driving for Mitsubishi Motors' Ralliart team. Alongside Mitsubishi, he competed in a Chevrolet Pro-Truck, X-Raid BMW, Volkswagen and in 2006, even for Fiat with its Panda 4x4 on the Dakar with the 'PanDakar' project. Driving for Volkswagen, he won the 2005 FIA cross-country rallye world championship. He retired in July 2008.

== WRC victories ==
#	Event	Season	Co-driver	Car
1	(France) 30ème Tour de Corse	1986	Jean-François Fauchille	Peugeot 205 Turbo 16 E2
2	(Monaco) 56ème Rallye Monte-Carlo	1988	Jean-François Fauchille	Lancia Delta HF 4WD

== Racing record ==
=== Complete IMC results ===
Year	Entrant	Car	1	2	3	4	5	6	7	8	9
1971	Bruno Saby	Ford Capri 2300 GT	MON; Ret	SWE	ITA	KEN	MAR	AUT	GRE	FRA	GBR

=== Complete WRC results ===
Year	Entrant	Car	1	2	3	4	5	6	7	8	9	10	11	12	13	14	WDC	Points
1973	Bruno Saby	Renault 12 Gordini	MON; Ret	SWE	POR	KEN	MOR										N/A	N/A
1973	Bruno Saby	Opel Ascona SR						GRE; Ret	POL	FIN	AUT	ITA	USA	GBR	FRA		N/A	N/A
1974	Bruno Saby	Opel Ascona SR	POR	KEN	FIN; Ret	ITA	CAN	USA	GBR	FRA							N/A	N/A
1976	Team Chardonnet	Autobianchi A112 Abarth	MON; Ret	SWE	POR	KEN	GRE	MOR	FIN	ITA	FRA	GBR					N/A	N/A
1978	Team Chardonnet	Autobianchi A112 Abarth	MON; 92	SWE	KEN	POR	GRE	FIN	CAN	ITA	CIV	FRA					N/A	N/A
1978	Bruno Saby	Alpine A110 1600											GBR; Ret				N/A	N/A
1979	Renault Elf Calberson	Renault 5 Turbo	MON; 94	SWE	POR	KEN	GRE	NZL	FIN	CAN	ITA	FRA	GBR				NC	0
1979	Bruno Saby	Renault 5 Turbo												CIV; Ret			NC	0
1980	Garage Galtier	Renault 5 Alpine	MON; 15	SWE	POR	KEN	GRC	ARG	FIN	NZL	ITA						25th	10
1980	Garage Galtier	Renault 5 Turbo										FRA; 4	GBR	CIV			25th	10
1981	Renault Elf	Renault 5 Turbo	MON; 85	SWE	POR	KEN											NC	0
1981	Garage Galtier	Renault 5 Turbo					FRA; Ret	GRC	ARG	BRA	FIN	ITA	CIV	GBR; Ret			NC	0
1982	Garage Galtier	Renault 5 Turbo	MON; 5	SWE	POR	KEN											9th	26
1982	Renault Sodicam Elf	Renault 5 Turbo					FRA; 5	GRC	NZL	BRA	FIN	ITA					9th	26
1982	Renault Sport Elf	Renault 5 Turbo											CIV; 4	GBR			9th	26
1983	Philips Auto Radio	Renault 5 Turbo	MON; 13	SWE	POR	KEN	FRA; 5	GRC	NZL	ARG	FIN	ITA	CIV	GBR			20th	9
1984	Philips Auto Radio	Renault 5 Turbo	MON; 83	SWE	POR	KEN	FRA; Ret	GRE	NZL	ARG	FIN; 8	ITA	CIV	GBR			43rd	3
1985	Peugeot Talbot Sport	Peugeot 205 Turbo 16	MON; 5	SWE	POR	KEN; Ret											11th	23
1985	Peugeot Talbot Sport	Peugeot 205 Turbo 16 E2					FRA; 2	GRC	NZL	ARG	FIN	ITA; Ret	CIV	GBR			11th	23
1986	Peugeot Talbot Sport	Peugeot 205 Turbo 16 E2	MON; 6	SWE	POR	KEN	FRA; 1	GRE; 3	NZL	ARG; Ret	FIN	CIV	ITA; DSQ	GBR	USA		7th	38
1987	Martini Lancia	Lancia Delta HF 4WD	MON; Ret	SWE	POR	KEN	FRA; Ret	GRE	USA	NZL	ARG	FIN	CIV				20th	15
1987	Team Chardonnet	Lancia Delta HF 4WD												ITA; 2	GBR		20th	15
1988	Martini Lancia	Lancia Delta HF 4WD	MON; 1	SWE	POR	KEN											6th	32
1988	Martini Lancia	Lancia Delta Integrale					FRA; 3	GRC	USA	NZL	ARG	FIN	CIV	ITA	GBR		6th	32
1989	Martini Lancia	Lancia Delta Integrale	SWE	MON; 3	POR	KEN	FRA; Ret	GRC	NZL	ARG	FIN	AUS	ITA	CIV	GBR		25th	12
1990	Lancia Fina	Lancia Delta Integrale 16V	MON; 6	POR	KEN	FRA; 4	GRC	NZL	ARG	FIN	AUS	ITA	CIV	GBR			15th	16
1991	Lancia Fina	Lancia Delta Integrale 16V	MON; 6	SWE	POR	KEN	FRA; Ret	GRE	NZL	ARG	FIN	AUS	ITA	CIV	ESP	GBR; 9	33rd	8

Sporting positions
Preceded by Hubert Auriol	Dakar Rally; Car Winner; 1993	Succeeded by Pierre Lartigue
