= Bob Neyret =

French rally driver (born 1934)

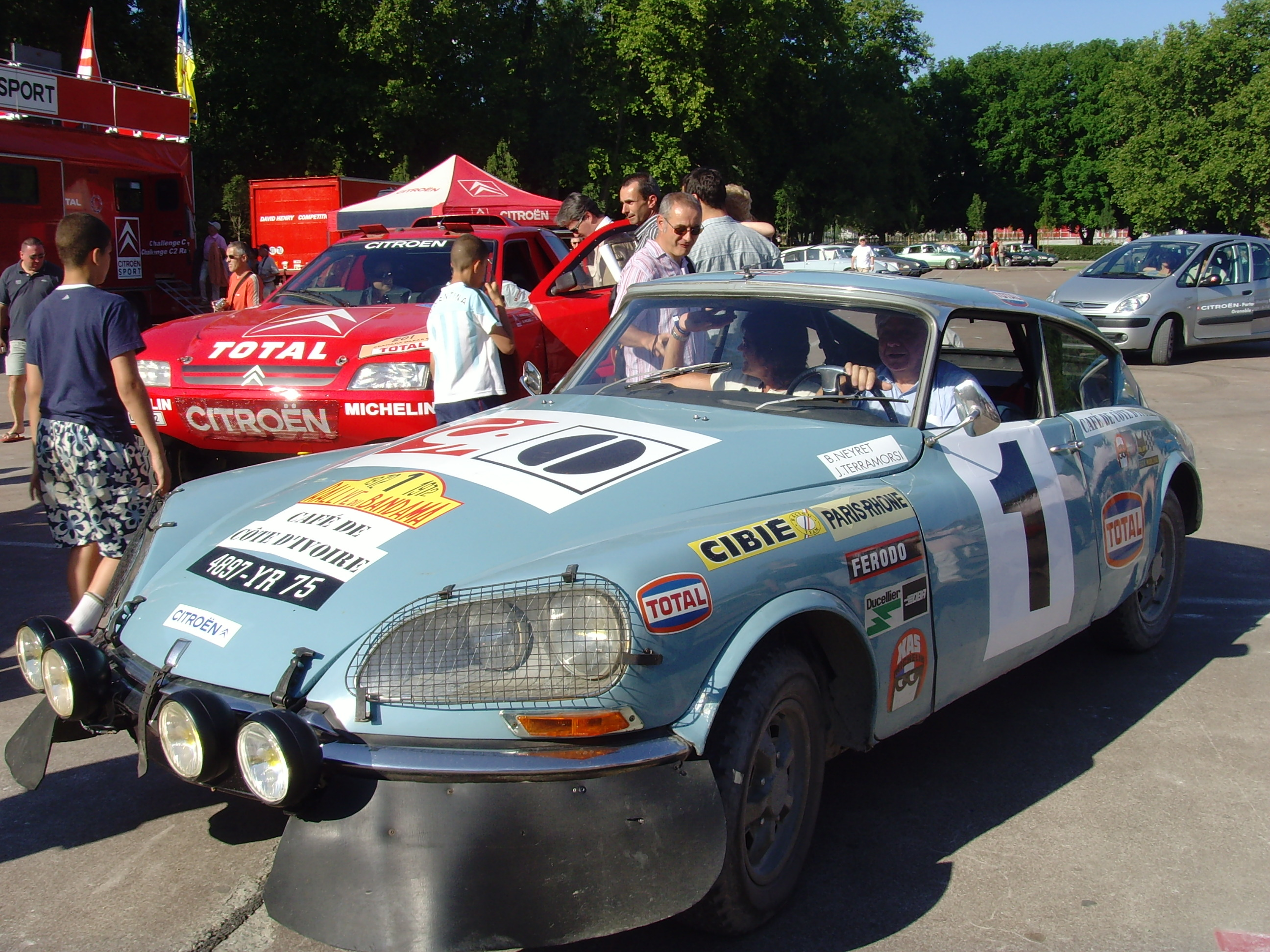
- Neyret with his 1972 Citroën DS in 2007

Personal information
- Nationality: (France) French
- Born: 28 February 1934 (age 92); Grenoble, France

World Rally Championship record
- Years active: 1973–1977, 1981
- Co-driver: (France) Jacques Terramorsi (France) Evelyne Vanoni (France) Claudine Bouchet
- Teams: Citroën, Team Aseptogyl
- Rallies: 8
- Championships: 0
- Rally wins: 0
- Podiums: 2
- Stage wins: 0
- Total points: 0
- First rally: 1973 Rallye du Maroc
- Last rally: 1981 Rallye Côte d'Ivoire

Robert "Bob" Neyret (born 28 February 1934 in Grenoble) is a retired French dental surgeon and semi-professional rally driver who competed in beginning in 1954.

Neyret was impressed by the victory of the Citroën DS in 1959 Monte-Carlo Rally and switched to that model. In the 1961 Liège-Sofia-Liège 4000 km race won by accomplished professional driver Lucien Bianchi in a DS 19, Neyret won 3rd place overall in his DS 19, ahead of more than 280 competitors.

Neyret won the Rallye du Maroc in 1969 and 1970 in a DS 21. In 1972, when the event was part of the International Championship for Manufacturers, he finished second in a Citroën DS 21. At the same rally, Neyret also recorded his only World Rally Championship podium finishes; second in 1973 in a DS 23 and third in 1975 in an Alpine-Renault A110 1800.

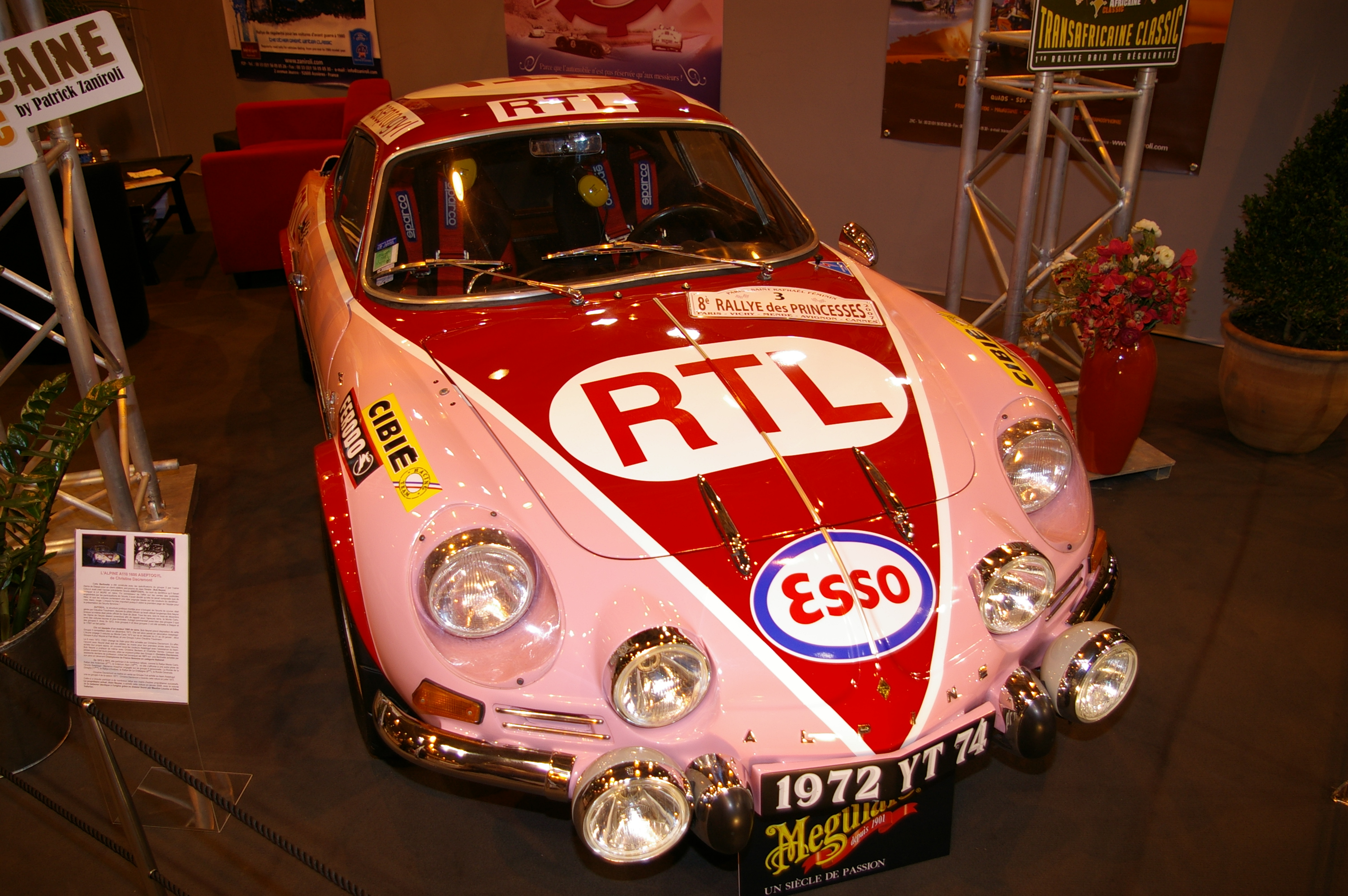
Team Esso Aseptogyl Alpine A110

His Team Esso Aseptogyl took part in the 24 Hours of Le Mans in 1977 and 1978, always with renowned French female drivers like Marianne Hoepfner and Christine Dacremont.

In 1989, his daughter Pascale Neyret won the Ladies' Cup Promotion in the Monte Carlo Rally, finishing 22nd in the general classification, with Carole Cerboneschi as co-driver on Lancia Delta Intégrale.

Since 2009, Neyret has become "Team Manager" at the head of a team of Citroëns, which take part, season after season, in Historic Rallies. Neyret competed in the 2015 Paris to Beijing classic car race in a 1967 DS 21, with many pictures to illustrate the journey.

== Racing record ==
=== Complete IMC results ===
Year	Entrant	Car	1	2	3	4	5	6	7	8	9
1971	Robert Neyret	Alpine-Renault A110 1600	MON; Ret	SWE	ITA	KEN					
1971	Robert Neyret	Citroën DS 21					MAR; 4	AUT	GRE	FRA	GBR
1972	Robert Neyret	Alpine-Renault A110 1600S	MON; 7	SWE	KEN						
1972	Robert Neyret	Citroën DS 21 Proto Chassis Court				MAR; 2	GRE	AUT	ITA	USA	GBR

=== Complete WRC results ===
Year	Entrant	Car	1	2	3	4	5	6	7	8	9	10	11	12	13	WDC	Pts
1973	Citroën S.A.	Citroën DS 23	MON	SWE	POR	KEN	MOR; 2	GRE	POL	FIN	AUT	ITA	USA	GBR	FRA	N/A	N/A
1974	Team Aseptogyl	Alpine-Renault A110 1800	POR; 6	KEN	FIN	ITA	CAN	USA; 8	GBR	FRA						N/A	N/A
1975	Team Aseptogyl	Alpine-Renault A110 1800	MON	SWE	KEN; 13	GRE	MOR; 3	POR	FIN	ITA	FRA	GBR				N/A	N/A
1976	Team Aseptogyl	Alpine-Renault A110 1800	MON	SWE	POR	KEN	GRC; Ret	MOR	FIN	ITA	FRA	GBR				N/A	N/A
1977	Team Aseptogyl	Alpine-Renault A310 1800	MON	SWE	POR; Ret	KEN	NZL	GRC	FIN	CAN	ITA	FRA	GBR			N/A	N/A
1981	Robert Neyret	Alpine-Renault A310 V6	MON	SWE	POR	KEN	FRA	GRC	ARG	BRA	FIN	ITA	CIV; Ret	GBR		NC	0
