= Francisco Romãozinho =

Portuguese rally driver (1943–2020)

Personal information
- Nationality: (Portugal) Portuguese
- Born: 28 March 1943
- Died: 20 March 2020 (aged 76)

World Rally Championship record
- Years active: 1973–1978, 1981, 1983
- Co-driver: (Portugal) José Bernardo (Portugal) João Nogueira da Silva (Portugal) Pedro Almeida
- Teams: Citroën
- Rallies: 9
- Championships: 0
- Rally wins: 0
- Podiums: 1
- Stage wins: 0
- Total points: 0
- First rally: 1973 Rallye de Portugal
- Last rally: 1983 Rallye de Portugal

Francisco Manuel Ruivo Ferreira Romãozinho (28 March 1943 – 12 March 2020) was a Portuguese professional rally driver who competed in the 1970s.

Romãozinho, driving a Citroën DS21 and partnered by José Bernardo, achieved his best result in the World Rally Championship at the 1973 Rallye de Portugal, his home event, by finishing third.

== Racing record ==
=== Complete IMC results ===
Year	Entrant	Car	1	2	3	4	5	6	7	8	9
1971	Francisco Romãozinho	Citroën DS 21	MON	SWE	ITA	KEN	MAR	AUT; Ret	GRE	FRA	GBR
1972	Francisco Romãozinho	Citroën DS 21	MON; 19	SWE	KEN	MAR; Ret	GRE	AUT	ITA	USA	GBR

=== Complete WRC results ===
Year	Entrant	Car	1	2	3	4	5	6	7	8	9	10	11	12	13	WDC	Pts
1973	Citroën Compétitions	Citroën DS 21	MON	SWE	POR; 3	KEN										N/A	N/A
1973	Citroën S.A.	Citroën GS 1220					MOR; Ret	GRE	POL	FIN	AUT	ITA	USA	GBR	FRA	N/A	N/A
1974	Francisco Romãozinho	Citroën GS 1220	POR; 8	KEN	FIN	ITA	CAN	USA	GBR	FRA						N/A	N/A
1975	Francisco Romãozinho	Citroën GS 1220	MON	SWE	KEN	GRE	MOR	POR; 8	FIN	ITA	FRA	GBR				N/A	N/A
1976	Francisco Romãozinho	Citroën GS 1220	MON	SWE	POR; Ret	KEN	GRC	MOR	FIN	ITA	FRA	GBR				N/A	N/A
1977	Francisco Romãozinho	Citroën CX GTI	MON	SWE	POR; Ret	KEN	NZL	GRC	FIN	CAN	ITA	FRA	GBR			N/A	N/A
1978	Citroën Compétitions	Citroën CX GTI	MON	SWE	KEN	POR; Ret	GRE	FIN	CAN	ITA	CIV	FRA	GBR			N/A	N/A
1981	Francisco Romãozinho	Citroën Visa SX	MON	SWE	POR	KEN	FRA	GRC	ARG; Ret	BRA	FIN	ITA	CIV	GBR		NC	0
1983	Francisco Romãozinho	Citroën Visa Chrono	MON	SWE	POR; Ret	KEN	FRA	GRC	NZL	ARG	FIN	ITA	CIV	GBR		NC	0
