= Ove Andersson =

Swedish rally driver (1938–2008)

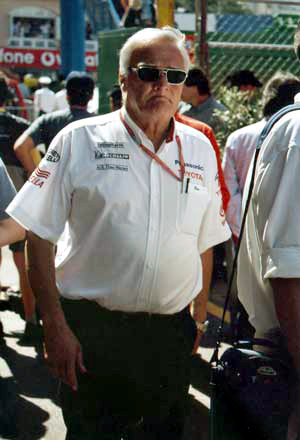
- Ove Andersson at the 2002 Monaco Grand Prix

Personal information
- Nationality: (Sweden) Swedish
- Born: 3 January 1938; Uppsala, Sweden
- Died: 11 June 2008 (aged 70); Oudtshoorn, South Africa

World Rally Championship record
- Years active: 1973–1980, 1982
- Co-driver: (France) Jean Todt (Italy) Piero Sodano (Sweden) Gunnar Häggbom (United Kingdom) Geraint Phillips (Sweden) Arne Hertz (Sweden) Claes Billstam (United Kingdom) Martin Holmes (United Kingdom) Henry Liddon (Finland) Robert Gröndahl
- Teams: Alpine Renault, Lancia, Toyota
- Rallies: 28
- Championships: 0
- Rally wins: 1
- Podiums: 7
- Stage wins: 20
- Total points: 32
- First rally: 1973 Monte Carlo Rally
- First win: 1975 Safari Rally
- Last rally: 1982 Rallye Côte d'Ivoire

Ove Andersson (3 January 1938 – 11 June 2008), nicknamed Påven ("the Pope"), was a Swedish rally driver and the first head of Toyota's F1 programme.

== Early life ==
Andersson was born in Uppsala and grew up on a remote farm. His father bought a 98cc motorbike, and Andersson said this was where he first fell in love with speed and machinery. He went on to begin studying engineering in Uppsala, and also began marshalling ice races. He dropped his engineering course and began working as an apprentice to a blacksmith in the city. He then went on to work in a car repair shop, the owner of which encouraged Andersson to begin racing after showing him his skills with a motorbike.

In 1958, Andersson completed his compulsory military service with the United Nations (UN) peace-keeping force in the Gaza Strip. During this service he survived typhoid and a fire. Upon returning home he attempted to rejoin the UN but with little success. A friend encouraged him to join him in a rally, in which the pairing finished in sixth place. Local rally drivers saw that he had potential, but as he had little money he could not afford to race. His friend Bengt Söderström became a Saab factory rally driver, and Andersson was able to borrow parts to make his car more competitive. The UN eventually offered him the opportunity to serve in the Congo, but he turned it down to concentrate on his rallying career.

== Rallying career ==
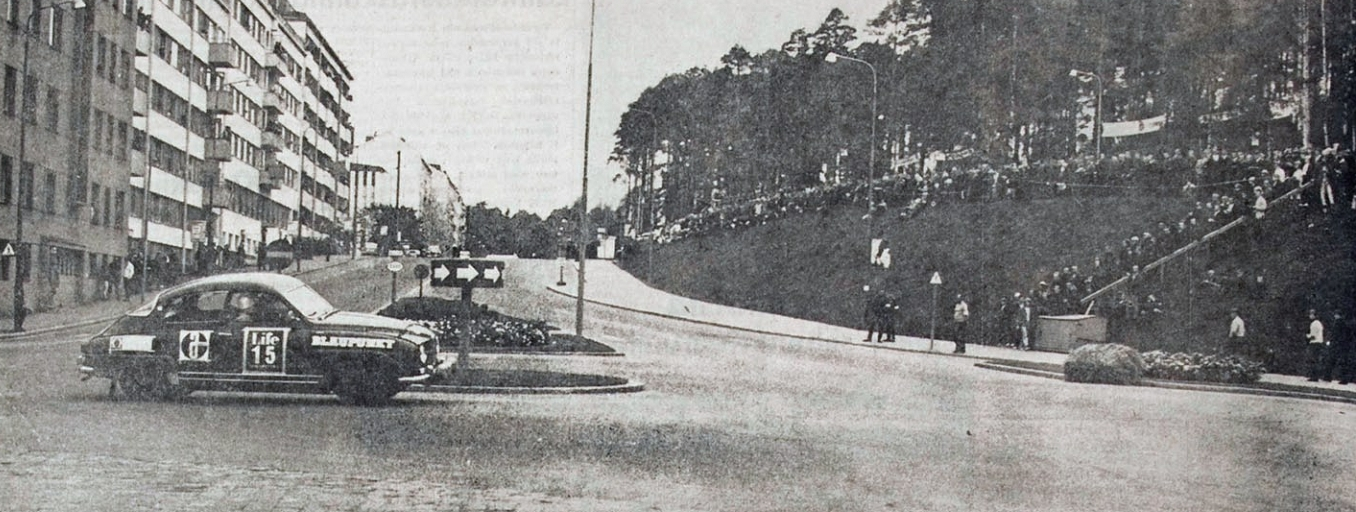
Andersson at the 1965 1000 Lakes Rally in Jyväskylä

In 1963, Andersson drove for the first time as a factory-backed driver in the Swedish Rally, using a Mini. He impressed the team boss, Stuart Turner, for him to be given a Mini Cooper S for the RAC Rally. He went on to drive for Saab in 1964 and 1965, but he felt he was in the shadow of Erik Carlsson whom Andersson believed was given better machinery by Saab. In 1965, he rallied the first three rounds of the championship with Lancia, finishing third in all of them. He also drove in the Swedish Rally Championship, and won the Swedish World Rally in a Lotus Cortina. In 1967, he won the Monte Carlo Rally with Lancia.

Despite being signed to Ford for 1968, Andersson competed in Daytona 24 hours with Lancia and also in the Monte Carlo Rally. At the end of the 1970 season, he was approached by Alpine whom he began to drive for in 1971. Andersson won the Monte Carlo Rally, Rallye Sanremo, Österreichische Alpenfahrt and Acropolis Rally with an Alpine A110, winning the International Championship for Manufacturers title for Alpine. In 1972, he came second in the Monte Carlo rally with Jean Todt as his co-driver. After the inauguration of the World Rally Championship in 1973, Andersson, drove mainly a Toyota Celica, achieved seven podium places in his 28 outings in the series and won the 1975 Safari Rally in a Peugeot 504, co-driven by Arne Hertz.

=== WRC victories ===
#	Event	Season	Co-driver	Car
1	(Kenya) 23rd Safari Rally	1975	Arne Hertz	Peugeot 504

=== Complete IMC results ===
Year	Entrant	Car	1	2	3	4	5	6	7	8	9
1970	Ford Motor Co. Ltd.	Ford Escort Twin Cam	MON	SWE; Ret	ITA; Ret	KEN	AUT; Ret	GRE; 3			
1970	Alpine Renault	Alpine-Renault A110 1600							GBR; Ret		
1971	Alpine Renault	Alpine-Renault A110 1600	MON; 1	SWE; Ret	ITA; 1	KEN	MAR	AUT; 1	GRE; 1	FRA; Ret	GBR; Ret
1972	Alpine Renault	Alpine-Renault A110 1800	MON; 28			MAR; Ret	GRE	AUT	ITA; Ret	USA	
1972	Films MK	Renault 12 Gordini		SWE; 15							
1972	Nissan Motor Co. Ltd.	Datsun 1800 SSS			KEN; 12						
1972	Team St. Bruno	Toyota Celica 1600 GT									GBR; 9

=== Complete WRC results ===
Year	Entrant	Car	1	2	3	4	5	6	7	8	9	10	11	12	13	WDC	Pts
1973	Alpine Renault	Alpine-Renault A110 1800	MON; 2													N/A	N/A
1973	Lancia HF Squadra Corse	Lancia Fulvia 1.6 Coupé HF		SWE; Ret												N/A	N/A
1973	Toyota Motor Sales Co. Ltd.	Toyota Celica 1600 GT			POR; Ret						AUT; 8	ITA	USA			N/A	N/A
1973	Ove Andersson	Toyota Celica 1600 GT						GRE; Ret	POL	FIN						N/A	N/A
1973	Team St. Bruno	Toyota Celica 1600 GT												GBR; 12	FRA	N/A	N/A
1973	Marshalls (EA) Ltd.	Peugeot 504				KEN; 3	MOR									N/A	N/A
1974	Salvador Caetano / VIP	Toyota Corolla Levin	POR; 4													N/A	N/A
1974	Dealer Team Toyota	Toyota Corolla Levin							GBR; Ret	FRA						N/A	N/A
1974	Marshalls (EA) Ltd.	Peugeot 504		KEN; Ret	FIN	ITA	CAN	USA								N/A	N/A
1975	Marshalls (EA) Ltd.	Peugeot 504	MON	SWE	KEN; 1											N/A	N/A
1975	Dealer Team Toyota	Toyota Celica 2000 GT										GBR; Ret				N/A	N/A
1975	Dealer Team Toyota	Toyota Corolla Levin				GRE; Ret	MOR									N/A	N/A
1975	Team Salvador Caetano	Toyota Corolla Levin						POR; 3	FIN	ITA	FRA					N/A	N/A
1976	Team Salvador Caetano	Toyota Celica 2000 GT	MON	SWE	POR; 2	KEN										N/A	N/A
1976	Kassidopoulos AEBE	Toyota Celica 2000 GT					GRE; Ret	MOR	FIN	ITA	FRA					N/A	N/A
1976	Team Toyota Great Britain	Toyota Corolla Levin										GBR; 5				N/A	N/A
1977	Team Salvador Caetano	Toyota Celica 2000 GT	MON	SWE	POR; 3	KEN	NZL									N/A	N/A
1977	Ove Andersson	Toyota Celica 2000 GT						GRE; Ret	FIN	CAN	ITA	FRA	GBR			N/A	N/A
1978	Team Salvador Caetano	Toyota Celica 2000 GT	MON	SWE	KEN	POR; 4										N/A	N/A
1978	Ove Andersson	Toyota Celica 2000 GT					GRE; 2	FIN	CAN	ITA	CIV	FRA	GBR			N/A	N/A
1979	Toyota Team Europe	Toyota Celica 2000 GT	MON	SWE	POR; 3	KEN	GRE; Ret	NZL	FIN	CAN	ITA	FRA	GBR	CIV; 5		13th	20
1980	Toyota Team Europe	Toyota Celica 2000 GT	MON	SWE	POR; 6	KEN	GRC; 6	ARG	FIN	NZL	ITA	FRA	GBR			24th	12
1980	Premoto Toyota	Toyota Celica 2000 GT												CIV; Ret		24th	12
1982	Ove Andersson	Toyota Celica 2000 GT	MON	SWE	POR	KEN	FRA	GRC	NZL	BRA	FIN	ITA	CIV; WD	GBR		NC	0

== Toyota Team Europe ==
In the early 1970s, Andersson was also the owner of his own rally team Andersson Motorsport, which later became the Toyota Team Europe (TTE). In 1979 he moved the team from Uppsala to Cologne Germany where operations were based for an assault on the World Rally Championship.

TTE did not have regular rally victories until the 1980s with Juha Kankkunen and Björn Waldegård. The 1990s provided the bulk of success in World Rally for TTE, with Carlos Sainz, Juha Kankkunen and Didier Auriol providing success for the team. In 1993, TTE was purchased by Toyota Motor Corporation and renamed as Toyota Motorsport GmbH (TMG) by the Japanese automaker. At the end of the 1995 World Rally Championship season TMG was banned for twelve months from the WRC for using an illegal turbo restrictor on the Toyota Celica GT-Four ST205 that included both a bypass mechanism and spring-loaded devices to conceal it from scrutineers.

In addition to the World Rally exploits of Toyota Motorsport, the team attempted to win the Le Mans 24 Hours endurance race. The team created the Toyota GT-One race car, which was entered into the 1998 and 1999 races achieving a best result of second place.

Afterwards, the Cologne factory was sent into overdrive for a Formula One project. Andersson was set to oversee the new team, which designed and produced its first car in 2001. The Toyota TF101 was only a test prototype car to be used around the world before Toyota launched a formal attack on F1. It was driven by Mika Salo and Allan McNish who would also drive the car in its first competitive season, 2002. In charge for the troublesome first few years, Andersson retired in 2003 but was retained as a consultant to Toyota Motorsport.

== Death ==
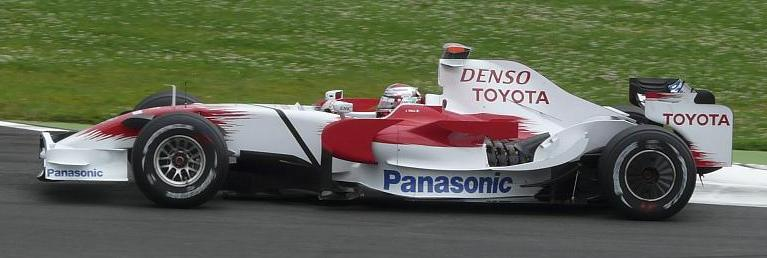
The Toyota F1 team paid tribute to Andersson at the 2008 French Grand Prix.

Andersson died in a vintage rally crash on 11 June 2008 near George, South Africa.

The Toyota F1 Team paid tribute to Andersson in a variety of ways. Toyota Motorsports director and its Formula One team chief at the time, Tadashi Yamashina, said he was shocked and saddened by the news. While at the 2008 French Grand Prix, both Toyota's ran black stripes on the car. Jarno Trulli scored a podium finish at the event and he dedicated it to Andersson.
