= Rallye du Maroc =

Marathon rally

The Rallye du Maroc (Morocco Rally) was a marathon rally, similar to the Safari Rally, but that should not be confused with the Rallye du Maroc rally raid introduced in 2000.

== History ==
It was first run in 1934, and held intermittently until 1988. Established by the Royal Automobile Club of Morocco, it is one of the more difficult automotive rallies. In 1969 for example, seven cars completed the course, out of a starting field of 68 vehicles.

The event was a World Rally Championship round in 1973, 1975 and 1976. The stages were varied – from shorter, but rough and challenging more typical ones to desert crossings (like in the Dakar Rally), which were very long, reaching even few hundred kilometers, making refueling during the stage mandatory.

== List of winners ==
Season	Event	Driver / co-driver	Car
1934	1er Rallye du Maroc	(France) Bravard	Essex
1935	2ème Rallye du Maroc	(France) Jean Trévoux (France) Marcel Lesurque	Bugatti 3L
1937	3ème Rallye du Maroc	(France) Jean Trévoux (France) Marcel Lesurque	Hotchkiss
1950	4ème Rallye du Maroc	(France) Costa (France) Preynat	Simca 8 Sport
1951	5ème Rallye du Maroc	(France) Jean Lucas (France) Jacques Péron	Ferrari 212
1952	6ème Rallye du Maroc	(France) Robert Amic (France) Mareschi	Simca Aronde
1953	7ème Rallye du Maroc	(Belgium) Paul van de Kaart (France) Jacques Péron	Porsche 356 1300
1954	8ème Rallye du Maroc	(France) Robert La Caze (France) Grammatico	Simca Aronde
1955	9ème Rallye du Maroc	(France) Jean Deschazeaux (France) Marteau	Peugeot 203
1967	10ème Rallye du Maroc	(Morocco) Robert La Caze (Morocco) Raymond Ponnelle	Renault 8 Gordini
1968	11ème Rallye du Maroc	(France) Jean-Pierre Nicolas (France) Jean de Alexandris	Renault 8 Gordini
1969	12ème Rallye du Maroc	(France) Robert Neyret (France) Jacques Terramorsi	Citroën DS 21
1970	13ème Rallye du Maroc	(France) Robert Neyret (France) Jacques Terramorsi	Citroën DS 21
1971	14ème Rallye du Maroc	(France) Jean Deschazeaux (France) Jean Plassard	Citroën SM
1972	15ème Rallye du Maroc	(Finland) Simo Lampinen (Sweden) Sölve Andreasson	Lancia Fulvia HF 1.6 Coupé
1973	16ème Rallye du Maroc (8 – 13 May)	(France) Bernard Darniche (France) Alain Mahé	Alpine-Renault A110 1800
1974	17ème Rallye du Maroc	(France) Jean-Pierre Nicolas (Belgium) Christian Delferrier	Alpine-Renault A110 1800
1975	18ème Rallye du Maroc (22 – 27 June)	(Finland) Hannu Mikkola (France) Jean Todt	Peugeot 504
1976	19ème Rallye du Maroc (24 – 28 June)	(France) Jean-Pierre Nicolas (France) Michel Gamet	Peugeot 504
1985	20ème Rallye du Maroc	(Kenya) Shekhar Mehta (Kenya) Yvonne Mehta	Nissan 240RS
1986	21ème Rallye du Maroc	(Ivory Coast) Alain Ambrosino (Ivory Coast) Daniel Le Saux	Nissan 240RS
1987	22ème Rallye du Maroc	(France) Maurice Chomat (France) Gilles Thimonier	Citroën Visa 1000 Pistes
1988	23ème Rallye du Maroc	(France) Paul Émile Descamps (France) Michel Gautheron	Opel Manta 400
