= Bulgaralpine =

Bulgarian sports car produced in the 1960s

Bulgaralpine was a sports automobile produced in Plovdiv, Bulgaria, that lasted for three years (1967–1969). It was the result of a collaboration between Alpine, a French automobile firm, and ETO Bulet, a Bulgarian export trade organisation.

== History ==
Alpine founder Jean Rédélé met with the Bulgarian firm Bulet at the end of 1966 in Sofia. Bulet had begun assembly of the Bulgarrenault with Renault and had a similar proposal for Alpine. While in Bulgaria, Rédélé was introduced to the Bulgarian racer Iliya Chubrikov, who agreed to test-drive the Alpine A110 on the Sofia Ring Road, at that time still in construction. The performance cemented an agreement between the two firms and several 1,000-cubic-centimeter-displacement engines from Alpine were shipped to Bulgaria in early 1967. Assembly of Bulgaralpine began later that year, after Chubrikov won first place in the Transbalkania rally. Chubrikov was hired by Bulet as production manager for the sports cars.

In order to manufacture the fiberglass bodies, Bulgaria licensed the manufacturing method for a payment of 8 million French francs, which secured the necessary machinery and tooling. The raw material for the manufacture of the fibreglass was initially imported from France, but later came from East Germany and Poland. The first several cars were popular in Europe and the United States. For publicity purposes, Bulet created an auto racing team of its own, made up of the Chubrikov brothers, the Agura brothers, Robert Kyurkchiev, Slavcho Georgiev, and Atanas Taskov. Two Bulgaralpine race cars were driven at the 1968 Monte Carlo Rally by Iliya and Nikola Chubrikov, and Atanas Taskov and Atanas Agura, respectively. All Bulgaralpine race cars were decommissioned after 1968.

The initial intention was to produce one Bulgaralpine car per day, but it is unclear how many were actually produced, with estimates ranging from 60 to 120 cars. Chubrikov recalls about 100 completed cars for domestic sale only. The Bulgaralpine was not intended for the mass consumer in Bulgaria, instead being aimed at sports clubs and racing teams. However, some wealthier consumers, such as Vasil Mirchev, bought them for private use. Mirchev drove his Bulgaralpine from Sofia to France to attend the 1969 Cannes Film Festival, covering the distance in 16 hours. The price of Bulgaralpine in 1969 was 8,200 Bulgarian leva.
