= 1973 World Rally Championship =

Inaugural season of the World Rally Championship

Champions
- World Manufacturers' Champion: Alpine-Renault

Seasons
- ← none 1974 →

The 1973 World Rally Championship was the inaugural season for the Fédération Internationale de l'Automobile (FIA) World Rally Championship (WRC) format. It consisted of 13 events, each held in a different country of the world. Many of the events would be staples of the series through to today, including Monte Carlo, Sweden, Tour de Corse, and the RAC Rally, while others would soon be replaced in the schedule. As with following seasons, gravel events formed the majority of the schedule. Two pure tarmac and one snow and ice rally were also included, as well as three events held on a mixture of soft and hard surface roads.

The first award of the Championship for Manufacturers was firmly won by Alpine-Renault, which had already gained fame competing for the earlier International Championship for Manufacturers. Fiat successfully placed second ahead of challenger Ford, but could not seriously challenge the winning Alpine. However, this would also prove to be the last award for the Alpine, as it gave way in subsequent years to Italian firms Lancia and Fiat. A French manufacturer would not regain the Championship again until Peugeot successfully captured the 1985 World Rally Championship for Manufacturers.

From 1973 to 1978, the WRC only awarded a season championship for the winning manufacturer. Scoring was given for the highest placing entry for each manufacturer. Thus if a particular manufacturer was to place 2nd, 4th, and 10th, they would receive points for 2nd place only. However, the manufacturer would still gain an advantage in scoring from its other entries, as the points for the 4th and 10th place entries would be denied to other manufacturers.

== Calendar ==
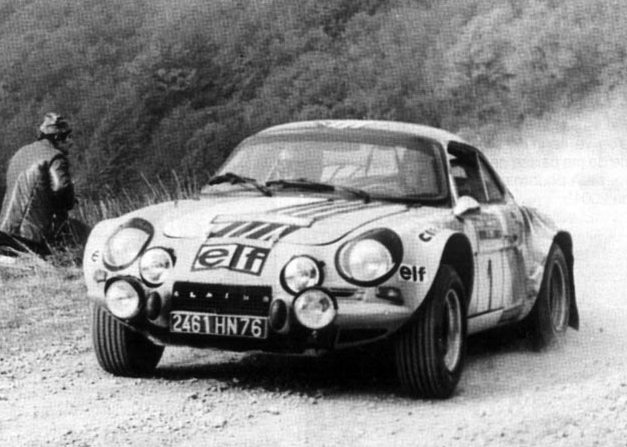
Alpine-Renault won the championship with the A110

For the first ever World Rally Championship, there were 13 rallies.

Round	Rally name	Surface	Dates
1	(Monaco) Rallye Monte-Carlo	Mixed (Tarmac - Snow)	19–26 January
2	(Sweden) Swedish Rally	Snow	15–18 February
3	Rallye de Portugal	Mixed (Tarmac - Gravel)	13–18 March
4	(Kenya) Safari Rally	Gravel	19–23 April
5	(Morocco) Rallye du Maroc	Gravel	8–13 May
6	(Greece) Acropolis Rally	Gravel	23–28 May
7	(Poland) Rajd Polski	Gravel	12–15 July
8	(Finland) 1000 Lakes Rally	Gravel	3–5 August
9	(Austria) Österreichische Alpenfahrt	Gravel	12–14 September
10	(Italy) Rallye Sanremo	Mixed (Tarmac - Gravel)	10–13 October
11	(United States) Press-on-Regardless Rally	Gravel	31 October–4 November
12	(United Kingdom) RAC Rally	Gravel	17–21 November
13	(France) Tour de Corse	Tarmac	1–2 December

== Events ==
1973 World Rally Championship event map
Black = Tarmac	Brown = Gravel	Blue = Snow/Ice	Red = Mixed Surface

Colour	Rally Surface
Gold	Gravel
Silver	Tarmac
Blue	Snow/Ice
Bronze	Mixed Surface

Round	Rally name	Podium finishers				Statistics			
Round	Rally name	Rank	Driver	Car	Time	Stages	Length	Starters	Finishers
1	(Monaco) Rallye Monte-Carlo (19–26 January) — Results and report	1	(France) Jean-Claude Andruet	Alpine Renault A110 1800	5:42:04	18	456,50 km	278	51
1	(Monaco) Rallye Monte-Carlo (19–26 January) — Results and report	2	(Sweden) Ove Andersson	Alpine Renault A110 1800	5:42:30	18	456,50 km	278	51
1	(Monaco) Rallye Monte-Carlo (19–26 January) — Results and report	3	(France) Jean-Pierre Nicolas	Alpine Renault A110 1800	5:43:39	18	456,50 km	278	51
2	(Sweden) Swedish Rally (15–18 February) — Results and report	1	(Sweden) Stig Blomqvist	Saab 96 V4	9:18:31	36	760,00 km	73	42
2	(Sweden) Swedish Rally (15–18 February) — Results and report	2	(Sweden) Per Eklund	Saab 96 V4	9:20:53	36	760,00 km	73	42
2	(Sweden) Swedish Rally (15–18 February) — Results and report	3	(France) Jean-Luc Thérier	Alpine Renault A110 1800	9:34:12	36	760,00 km	73	42
3	Rallye de Portugal (13–18 March) — Results and report	1	(France) Jean-Luc Thérier	Alpine Renault A110 1800	5:42:16	32	397,50 km	79	23
3	Rallye de Portugal (13–18 March) — Results and report	2	(France) Jean-Pierre Nicolas	Alpine Renault A110 1800	5:48:57	32	397,50 km	79	23
3	Rallye de Portugal (13–18 March) — Results and report	3	(Portugal) Francisco Romãozinho	Citroën DS21	6:07:48	32	397,50 km	79	23
4	(Kenya) Safari Rally (19–23 April) — Results and report	1	(Kenya) Shekhar Mehta	Datsun 240Z	+ 6:46 pen	56	5300.00 km	89	18
4	(Kenya) Safari Rally (19–23 April) — Results and report	2	(Sweden) Harry Källström	Datsun 1800 SSS	+ 6:46 pen	56	5300.00 km	89	18
4	(Kenya) Safari Rally (19–23 April) — Results and report	3	(Sweden) Ove Andersson	Peugeot 504	+ 8:47 pen	56	5300.00 km	89	18
5	(Morocco) Rallye du Maroc (8–13 May) — Results and report	1	(France) Bernard Darniche	Alpine Renault A110	15:01:22	11	1258.00 km	66	12
5	(Morocco) Rallye du Maroc (8–13 May) — Results and report	2	(France) Bob Neyret	Citroën DS23	15:20:04	11	1258.00 km	66	12
5	(Morocco) Rallye du Maroc (8–13 May) — Results and report	3	(Austria) Richard Bochnicek	Citroën DS23	15:34:37	11	1258.00 km	66	12
6	(Greece) Acropolis Rally (23–28 May) — Results and report	1	(France) Jean-Luc Thérier	Alpine Renault A110	7:37:58	47	556.35 km	83	11
6	(Greece) Acropolis Rally (23–28 May) — Results and report	2	(Finland) Rauno Aaltonen	Fiat Abarth 124	7:44:59	47	556.35 km	83	11
6	(Greece) Acropolis Rally (23–28 May) — Results and report	3	(France) Jean-Pierre Nicolas	Alpine Renault A110	7:45:56	47	556.35 km	83	11
7	(Poland) Rajd Polski (12–15 July) — Results and report	1	(West Germany) Achim Warmbold	Fiat Abarth 124 Rallye	8:28:14	55	742.30 km	62	3
7	(Poland) Rajd Polski (12–15 July) — Results and report	2	(East Germany) Egon Culmbacher	Wartburg 353	11:15:16	55	742.30 km	62	3
7	(Poland) Rajd Polski (12–15 July) — Results and report	3	(Poland) Maciej Stawowiak	Polski Fiat 125p	12:08:31	55	742.30 km	62	3
8	(Finland) 1000 Lakes Rally (3–5 August) — Results and report	1	(Finland) Timo Mäkinen	Ford Escort RS1600	4:53:50	43	517.20 km	109	55
8	(Finland) 1000 Lakes Rally (3–5 August) — Results and report	2	(Finland) Markku Alén	Volvo 142	4:55:59	43	517.20 km	109	55
8	(Finland) 1000 Lakes Rally (3–5 August) — Results and report	3	(Finland) Leo Kinnunen	Porsche 911	4:57:12	43	517.20 km	109	55
9	(Austria) Österreichische Alpenfahrt (12–14 September) — Results and report	1	(West Germany) Achim Warmbold	BMW 2002Tii	3:58:55	30	324.50 km	74	25
9	(Austria) Österreichische Alpenfahrt (12–14 September) — Results and report	2	(France) Bernard Darniche	Alpine Renault A110	4:00:10	30	324.50 km	74	25
9	(Austria) Österreichische Alpenfahrt (12–14 September) — Results and report	3	(Sweden) Per Eklund	Saab 96 V4	4:00:11	30	324.50 km	74	25
10	(Italy) Rallye Sanremo (10–13 October) — Results and report	1	(France) Jean-Luc Thérier	Alpine Renault A110	8:01:32	37	369.30 km	107	54
10	(Italy) Rallye Sanremo (10–13 October) — Results and report	2	(Italy) Maurizio Verini	Fiat Abarth 124 Rally	8:07:34	37	369.30 km	107	54
10	(Italy) Rallye Sanremo (10–13 October) — Results and report	3	(France) Jean-Pierre Nicolas	Alpine Renault A110	8:21:37	37	369.30 km	107	54
11	(United States) Press-on-Regardless Rally (31 October–4 November) — Results and report	1	(Canada) Walter Boyce	Toyota Corolla	6:58:28	85	552.61 km	58	23
11	(United States) Press-on-Regardless Rally (31 October–4 November) — Results and report	2	(United States) Jim Walker	Volvo 142S	7:22:43	85	552.61 km	58	23
11	(United States) Press-on-Regardless Rally (31 October–4 November) — Results and report	3	(United States) John Smiskol	Datsun 240Z	7:33:36	85	552.61 km	58	23
12	(United Kingdom) RAC Rally (17–21 November) — Results and report	1	(Finland) Timo Mäkinen	Ford Escort RS1600	6:47:08	80	540.02 km	198	91
12	(United Kingdom) RAC Rally (17–21 November) — Results and report	2	(United Kingdom) Roger Clark	Ford Escort RS1600	6:52:23	80	540.02 km	198	91
12	(United Kingdom) RAC Rally (17–21 November) — Results and report	3	(Finland) Markku Alén	Ford Escort RS1600	6:55:26	80	540.02 km	198	91
13	(France) Tour de Corse (1–2 December) — Results and report	1	(France) Jean-Pierre Nicolas	Alpine Renault A110	5:06:31	21	511.70 km	50	22
13	(France) Tour de Corse (1–2 December) — Results and report	2	(France) Jean-François Piot	Alpine Renault A110	5:14:37	21	511.70 km	50	22
13	(France) Tour de Corse (1–2 December) — Results and report	3	(France) Jean-Luc Thérier	Alpine Renault A110	5:18:46	21	511.70 km	50	22

== Championship ==
Points were awarded to the best placed vehicle of each manufacturer.

Position	1st	2nd	3rd	4th	5th	6th	7th	8th	9th	10th
Points	20	15	12	10	8	6	4	3	2	1

=== Manufacturers' championship ===
Pos.	Manufacturer	MON (Monaco)	SWE (Sweden)	POR (Portugal)	KEN (Kenya)	MAR (Morocco)	GRC (Greece)	POL (Poland)	FIN (Finland)	AUT (Austria)	ITA (Italy)	USA (United States)	GBR (United Kingdom)	FRA (France)	Points
1	(France) Alpine-Renault	1	3	1		1	1	Ret		2	1	Ret	(5)	1	147
2	(Italy) Fiat	7	5	4	(8)	6	2	1	(8)	6	2		(10)		84
3	(United States) Ford	4		9	14		7	Ret	1			4	1	4	76
4	(Sweden) Volvo		9			9			2			2	4		44
5	(Sweden) Saab	37	1						4	3			Ret		42
6	(Japan) Datsun	9	19	11	1	11			Ret			3	14	22	34
7	(France) Citroën			3		2	6			Ret					33
8	(Germany) BMW	17	7	13			Ret	Ret	17	1	51		7		28
9	(Germany) Porsche	46		5	Ret			Ret	3	7			22	8	27
10	(Japan) Toyota		23	Ret			9	Ret		8		1	12		25
11	(Germany) Opel	12	10	7		DSQ	11		5	13	9	Ret	6	7	25
12	(Poland) Polski Fiat	35						3				6			18
13	(Italy) Lancia	8	4								7		Ret		17
14	(East Germany) Wartburg	38						2	39						15
15	(Germany) Volkswagen		6	19		12	5			10					15
16	(France) Peugeot	Ret			3	10			22						13
17	(Japan) Mitsubishi				7										4
18	(Czechoslovakia) Škoda		8						15						3
19	(Italy) Alfa Romeo	19	17		Ret				13					9	2
20	(Germany) Audi	51					10							10	2
Pos.	Manufacturer	MON (Monaco)	SWE (Sweden)	POR (Portugal)	KEN (Kenya)	MAR (Morocco)	GRC (Greece)	POL (Poland)	FIN (Finland)	AUT (Austria)	ITA (Italy)	USA (United States)	GBR (United Kingdom)	FRA (France)	Points
Sources:

- Positions in parentheses did not count towards championship totals

== See also ==
- 1973 in sports
