= 1973 Swedish Rally =

Rallying motorsport event

1973 Swedish Rally 24th International Swedish Rally
Round 2 of the 1973 World Rally Championship season
← Previous event	Next event →
- Host country: Sweden
- Rally base: Karlstad, Sweden
- Dates run: February 15, 1973 – February 18, 1973
- Stages: 36 (760 km; 470 miles)
- Stage surface: Snow & ice
- Overall distance: 1,800 km (1,100 miles)

Statistics
- Crews: 73 at start, 42 at finish

Overall results
- Overall winner: (Sweden) Stig Blomqvist (Sweden) Rolf Carlsson (Sweden) Saab; Saab 96 V4

The 1973 Swedish Rally (formally the 24th International Swedish Rally) was the second round of the inaugural World Rally Championship season. Run in mid-February around Karlstad, Sweden, the rally was the only snow and ice rally of the WRC calendar, a distinction it would keep as it remained a fixture of the WRC through the years. Only in 2007 would it finally be joined on the schedule by a second snow rally in Norway.

== Report ==
In 1973, and for several years afterward, only manufacturers were given points for finishes in WRC events. After the Alpine A110s dominated the earlier Monte Carlo Rally, Sweden was instead taken by Swedish drivers Stig Blomqvist and Per Eklund, both driving Swedish-built Saab 96 V4 cars. While Jean-Luc Thérier did get an Alpine onto the podium in third place, it was the only such car to finish and he was one of only two drivers not of Scandinavian nationality to complete the race.

== Results ==
1973 Swedish Rally results
Finish		Total time	Group	Car #	Driver	Car	Mfr. points
Overall	In group	Total time	Group	Car #	Driver	Car	Mfr. points
1	1	9 h : 18 m : 31 s	1/2	1	(Sweden) Stig Blomqvist	Saab 96 V4	20
2	2	9 h : 20 m : 53 s	1/2	7	(Sweden) Per Eklund	Saab 96 V4	
3	1	9 h : 34 m : 12 s	4	11	(France) Jean-Luc Thérier	Alpine-Renault A110 1800	12
4	2	9 h : 37 m : 14 s	4	3	(Sweden) Harry Källstrom	Lancia Fulvia 1.6 Coupé HF	10
5	3	9 h : 40 m : 41 s	4	2	(Sweden) Håkan Lindberg	Fiat Abarth 124 Rallye	8
6	3	9 h : 57 m : 28 s	1/2	4	(Sweden) Björn Waldegård	Volkswagen 1303S	6
7	4	10 h : 0 m : 58 s	1/2	10	(Sweden) Bror Danielsson	BMW 2002	4
8	5	10 h : 35 m : 41 s	1/2	18	(Norway) John Haugland	Škoda 110L	3
9	6	10 h : 36 m : 42 s	1/2	9	(Sweden) Per-Inge Walfridsson	Volvo 142 S	2
10	7	10 h : 37 m : 22 s	1/2	14	(Finland) Fredrik Donner	Opel Ascona	1
11	8	10 h : 38 m : 7 s	1/2	33	(Sweden) Stig Abrahamsson	Saab 96 V4	
12	9	10 h : 39 m : 23 s	1/2	28	(Sweden) Kjell Ivarsson	Saab 96 V4	
13	10	10 h : 41 m : 31 s	1/2	13	(Sweden) Per Tjerneld	Opel Ascona	
14	11	10 h : 44 m : 30 s	1/2	8	(France) Jean-Pierre Nicolas	Renault 12 Gordini	
15	12	10 h : 49 m : 25 s	1/2	52	(Sweden) Sören Bergstedt	Renault 12 Gordini	
16	13	10 h : 50 m : 3 s	1/2	64	(Norway) Per Engseth	Volkswagen 1303S	
17	14	11 h : 2 m : 52 s	1/2	17	(Finland) Hans Sevelius	Alfa Romeo Giulia S	
18	15	11 h : 6 m : 50 s	1/2	47	(Norway) Jan Carlsson	Volvo 142 S	
19	16	11 h : 8 m : 21 s	1/2	16	(Norway) Egil Stenshagen	Datsun Cherry E	
20	17	11 h : 12 m : 34 s	1/2	20	(Norway) Ole Edvin Granberg	BMW 2002	
21	18	11 h : 16 m : 9 s	1/2	38	(Norway) Erik Aaby	Opel Ascona	
22	19	11 h : 19 m : 32 s	1/2	45	(Norway) Bjørn Flygind	Opel Ascona	
23	20	11 h : 30 m : 56 s	1/2	57	(Sweden) Freddy Kottulinsky	Toyota Corolla	
24	21	11 h : 38 m : 33 s	1/2	51	(Sweden) Mats Andersson	Saab 96 V4	
25	22	11 h : 41 m : 59 s	1/2	25	(Sweden) Johnny Lindersson	Volvo 142 S	
Retired			4	6	(Sweden) Ove Andersson	Lancia Fulvia 1.6 Coupé HF	
Retired			1/2	12	(Sweden) Lars Nyström	Volkswagen 1303S	
Retired			1/2	18	(Sweden) Roger Johansson	Saab 96 V4	
Retired			1/2	21	(France) Bernard Darniche	Renault 12 Gordini	

Source: Independent WRC archive

== Championship standings after the event ==
1973 World Rally Championship for Manufacturers points standings after round 2
After round 2		Team	Season end	
Position	Points	Team	Position	Points
1	32	(France) Alpine Renault	1	147
2	20	(Sweden) Saab	5	42
3	13	(Italy) Lancia	13	17
2	12	(Italy) Fiat	2	84
6	10	(United States) Ford	3	76
7	6	(Germany) Volkswagen	15	15
8	4	(Germany) BMW	8	28
9	3	(Czechoslovakia) Škoda	18	3
10	2	(Japan) Datsun	6	34
11	2	(Sweden) Volvo	4	44
12	1	(Germany) Opel	11	25
