= 1973 Monte Carlo Rally =

Championship car race in Monaco

1973 Monte Carlo Rally 42ème Rallye Automobile de Monte-Carlo
Round 1 of the 1973 World Rally Championship season
Next event →
- Host country: Monaco
- Dates run: January 19, 1973 – January 29, 1973
- Start location: Various cities
- Finish location: Monte Carlo
- Stages: 18 (420 km; 260 miles)
- Stage surface: Tarmac
- Overall distance: 4,800 km (3,000 miles)

Statistics
- Crews: 278 at start, 44 at finish

Overall results
- Overall winner: (France) Jean-Claude Andruet (France) "Biche" (France) Alpine Renault; Alpine Renault A110 1800

The 1973 Monte Carlo Rally (formally the 42ème Rallye Automobile de Monte-Carlo), run in late January and hosted in the principality of Monaco, was the first rally on the Fédération Internationale de l'Automobile's (FIA) new World Rally Championship (WRC) inaugural season, making it the first ever WRC event to be held.

== Report ==
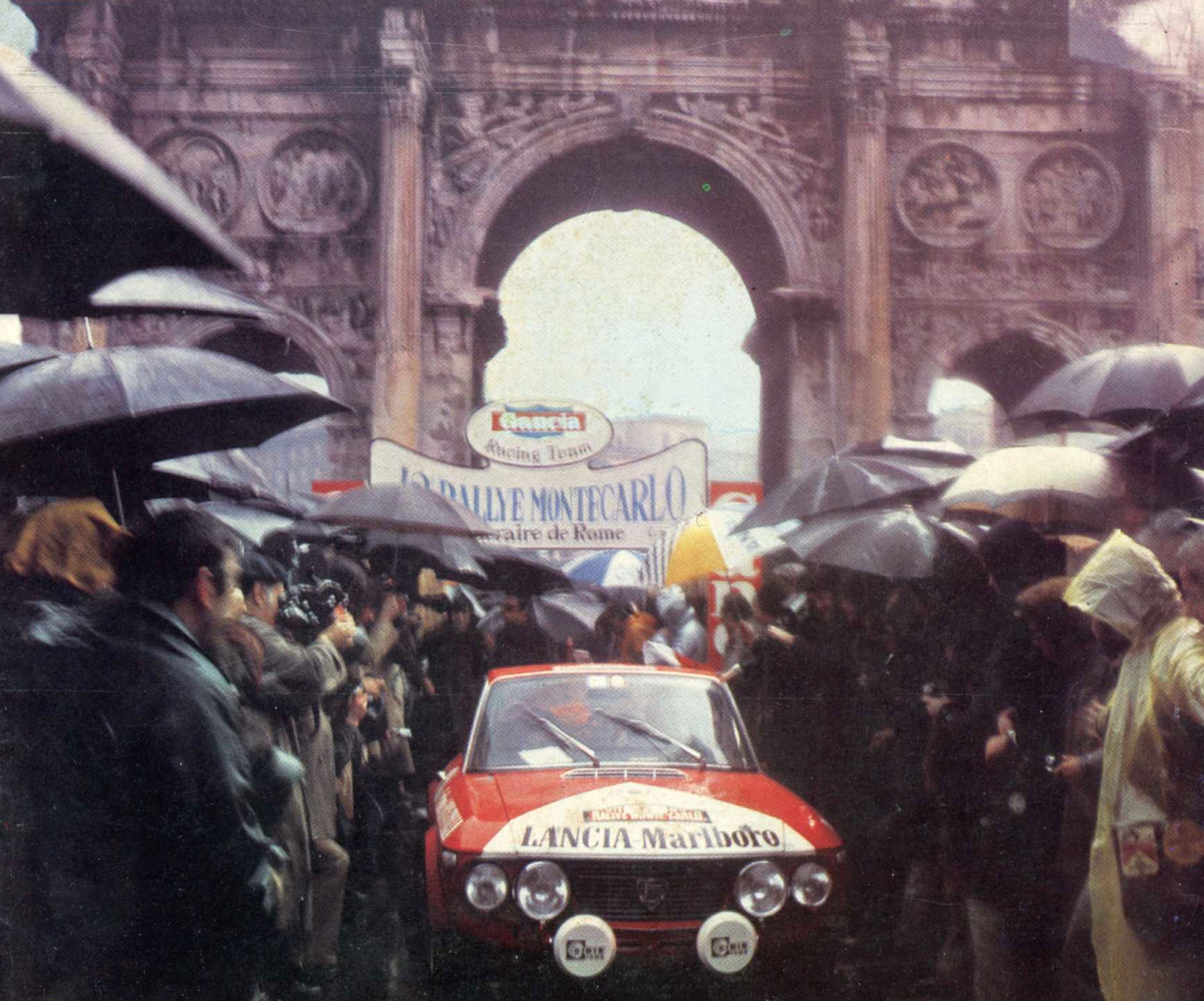
Simo Lampinen and co-driver Piero Sodano on Lancia Fulvia 1.6 Coupé HF at the Rome's concentration phase departure, 19 January 1973

At this time, the Monte-Carlo rally was structured as a concentration rally, with teams beginning competition in some nine different cities, with the first objective of the rally being to reach Monte Carlo, followed by two legs of competitive special stages around Monaco and southeastern France. Traditionally run on tarmac roads commonly covered in snow and ice, especially at higher altitudes, bad weather did force cancellation of two special stages in 1973.

In 1973, and for several years afterward, only manufacturers were given points for finishes in WRC events. Alpine Renault dominated the event, a portent of their further success during the season with their Alpine-Renault A110 1800 car. They would take all three podium positions and five of the top six places.

== Results ==
1973 Monte Carlo Rally results
Finish		Total time	Group	Car #	Driver	Car	Mfr. points
Overall	In group	Total time	Group	Car #	Driver	Car	Mfr. points
1	1	5:42.04	4	18	(France) Jean-Claude Andruet (France) "Biche"	(France) Alpine-Renault A110 1800	20
2	2	5:42.30	4	15	(Sweden) Ove Andersson (France) Jean Todt	(France) Alpine-Renault A110 1800	
3	3	5:43.39	4	21	(France) Jean-Pierre Nicolas (France) Michel Vial	(France) Alpine-Renault A110 1800	
4	1	5:44.29	2	20	(Finland) Hannu Mikkola (United Kingdom) Jim Porter	(United Kingdom) Ford Escort RS1600	10
5	4	5:46.01	4	4	(France) Jean-Luc Thérier (France) Marcel Callewaert	(France) Alpine-Renault A110 1800	
6	5	5:46.02	4	23	(France) Jean-Francois Piot (France) Jean-Louis Marnot	(France) Alpine-Renault A110 1800	
7	6	5:52.14	4	5	(Italy) Raffaele Pinto (Italy) Arnaldo Bernacchini	(Italy) Fiat Abarth 124 Rallye	4
8	7	5:52.15	4	16	(Sweden) Harry Källström (Sweden) Claes Billstam	(Italy) Lancia Fulvia 1.6 Coupé HF	3
9	8	5:55.47	4	17	(United Kingdom) Tony Fall (United Kingdom) Mike Wood	(Japan) Datsun 240Z	2
10	9	5:57.08	4	1	(France) Bernard Darniche (France) Alain Mahé	(France) Alpine-Renault A110 1800	
11	2	5:57.51	2	3	(Finland) Timo Mäkinen (United Kingdom) Henry Liddon	(United Kingdom) Ford Escort RS1600	
12	3	6:02.36	2	30	(Sweden) Lillebror Nasenius (Sweden) Björn Cederberg	(Germany) Opel Ascona A	
13	4	6:05.37	2	44	(Sweden) Anders Kulläng (Sweden) Claes-Göran Andersson	(Germany) Opel Ascona A	
14	10	6:06.37	4	36	(France) Bob Wollek (France) Pierre Thimonier	(France) Alpine-Renault A110 1800	
15	5	6:10.57	2	7	(France) Jean Ragnotti (France) Jacques Jaubert	(France) Renault 12 Gordini	
16	6	6:11.20	2	12	(United Kingdom) Chris Sclater (United Kingdom) John Davenport	(United Kingdom) Ford Escort RS1600	
17	7	6:11.31	2	46	(Germany) Reinhard Hainbach (Germany) Wulf Biebinger	(Germany) BMW 2002 TI	
18	11	6:14.43	4	10	(Finland) Rauno Aaltonen (United Kingdom) Paul Easter	(Japan) Datsun 240Z	
19	1	6:15.33	1	24	(France) Gérard Larrousse (Belgium) Christian Delferier	(Italy) Alfa Romeo 2000 GTV	
20	8	6:18.22	2	79	(France) Patrick Tambay (France) Gérard Marion	(France) Renault 12 Gordini	
21	9	6:19.08	2	34	(France) Bernard Fiorentino (France) Maurice Gélin	(France) Simca Rallye 2	
22	1	6:21.25	3	33	(France) Jacques Henry (France) Dominque Thiry	(France) Alpine-Renault A110 1800	
23	12	6:23.33	4	39	(France) Claude Ballot-Léna (France) Jean-Claude Morenas	(France) Alpine-Renault A110 1800	
24	2	6:29.17	2	27	(France) Guy Chasseuil (France) Christian Baron	(Germany) BMW 2002 TI	
25	3	6:30.19	1	31	(France) Henri Greder (France) Henri Duclos	(Germany) Opel Ascona SR	
26	4	6:32.31	1	43	(France) Jean-Claude Lagniez (France) Martine Renier	(Italy) Alfa Romeo 2000 GTV	
27	13	6:32.40	4	211	(Austria) Klaus Russling (Austria) Wolfgang Weiss	(France) Alpine-Renault A110 1600	
28	10	6:34.26	2	52	(Sweden) Sylvia Österberg (Sweden) Inga-Lill Edenring	(Germany) Opel Ascona A	
29	11	6:47.18	2	83	(Netherlands) Bert Dolk (Netherlands) Bob de Jong	(Germany) Opel Ascona	
30	12	6:48.27	2	32	(France) Claude Laurent (France) Jacques Marché	(Netherlands) DAF 66	
31	13	6:57.36	2	51	(Socialist Federal Republic of Yugoslavia) Jovica Palikovic (Socialist Federal Republic of Yugoslavia) Aleksandar Švarcer	(France) Renault 12 Gordini	
32	2	6:58.58	3	49	(Monaco) Alex Vineis (France) Oswald Peri	(France) Alpine-Renault A110 1600	
33	14	7:05.59	2	54	(Germany) Joachim Springer (Germany) Hans-Christoph Mehmel	(Germany) Opel Ascona	
34	3	7:07.42	3	69	(France) Mariane Fourton (France) Evelyne Vanoni	(France) Alpine-Renault A110 1600	
35	15	7:14.57	2	41	(Poland) Robert Mucha (Poland) Ryszard Żyszkowski	(Poland) Polski Fiat 125p	
36	16	7:17.39	2	76	(Luxembourg) Aloyse Kridel Sr. (Luxembourg) Jos Brandenburger	(Germany) BMW 2002 TI	
37	17	7:18.00	2	91	(Sweden) Anders Sigurdsson (Sweden) Fergus Sager	(Sweden) Saab 96 V4	
38	18	7:24.55	2	25	(East Germany) Peter Hommel (East Germany) Günter Bork	(East Germany) Wartburg 353	
39	19	7:39.12	2	53	(Poland) Adam Smorawiński (Poland) Andrzej Zembrzuski	(Germany) BMW 2002	
40	14	7:41.06	4	14	(Italy) Franco Perazio (Italy) Giorgio Rossi	(Italy) Lancia Fulvia 1.6 Coupé HF	
41	20	8:17.38	2	81	(Poland) Marian Bień (Poland) Janusz Wojtyna	(Poland) Polski Fiat 125p	
42	4	8:18.14	3	63	(Italy) Serena Pittoni (France) Juliette Keefer	(Italy) Lancia Fulvia 1.6 Coupé HF	
43	5	8:58.54	1	65	(France) Jean-Claude Depince (France) Hervé Guyomard	(France) Simca 1100S	
44	21	9:09.14	2	74	(Sweden) Bertil Johansson (Sweden) Patrick Toorell	(Germany) Opel Ascona	
45	22	Retired*	2	22	(Germany) Walter Röhrl (Germany) Jochen Berger	(Germany) Opel Commodore GS/E	
46	5	Retired*	3	75	(Germany) Manfred Gudladt (Germany) Eckhard Erbach	(Germany) Porsche 911S	
47	15	Retired*	4	29	(United Kingdom) Pat Moss-Carlsson (United Kingdom) Elizabeth Crellin	(France) Alpine-Renault A110 1800	
48	16	Retired*	4	37	(Germany) Hans-Joachim Walter (Switzerland) Werner Lier	(Germany) Porsche 911S	
49	6	Retired*	1	72	(Germany) Friedrich-Karl Tuschy (Germany) Hans-Georg Eibel	(Italy) Fiat 128 Coupé	
50	7	Retired*	1	66	(Italy) Giorgio Pianta (Italy) Francesca Lurani	(Germany) Opel Ascona	
51	23	Retired*	2	60	(France) Michel Robini (Monaco) Auguste Turuani	(Germany) Audi 80	
Retired			4	2	(Sweden) Björn Waldegård (Sweden) Hans Thorszelius	(Italy) Fiat Abarth 124 Rallye	
Retired			4	6	(Finland) Simo Lampinen (Italy) Piero Sodano	(Italy) Lancia Fulvia 1.6 Coupé HF	
Retired			4	8	(Italy) Alcide Paganelli (Italy) Ninni Russo	(Italy) Fiat Abarth 124 Rallye	
Retired			4	11	(Italy) Sandro Munari (Italy) Mario Mannucci	(Italy) Lancia Fulvia 1.6 Coupé HF	
Retired			4	14	(Italy) Sergio Barbasio (Italy) Gino Macaluso	(Italy) Fiat Abarth 124 Rallye	
Retired			4	19	(Italy) Amilcare Ballestrieri (Italy) Silvio Maiga	(Italy) Lancia Fulvia 1.6 Coupé HF	
Retired			2	28	(France) Marie-Claude Beaumont (France) Christine Giganot	(Germany) Opel Ascona	
Retired			3	40	(France) Christine Dacremont (France) Marie-Odile Desvignes	(France) Alpine-Renault A110 1600	
Retired			4	42	(Germany) Dieter Kern (Germany) Ferdi Bökmann	(France) Alpine-Renault A110 1800	
Retired			2	45	(Germany) Klaus Fritzinger (Germany) Günther Schons	(United Kingdom) Ford Capri 2600	
Retired			3	47	(Italy) Orlando Dall'Ava (Italy) Sergio Maiga	(Italy) Lancia Fulvia 1.6 Coupé HF	
Retired			2	48	(Belgium) Chris Teulinckx (Belgium) Etienne Stalpaert	(Germany) Opel Ascona	
Retired			2	50	(Netherlands) Nicolas Koob (Netherlands) Leon Linden	(Germany) BMW 2002 Ti	
Retired			3	55	(France) Michel Jullien (France) Yves Célestin	(France) Alpine-Renault A110 1600	
Retired			3	57	(France) Jean-Charles Sévelinge (France) Joseph Sévelinge	(France) Alpine-Renault A110 1600	
Retired			2	59	(South Africa) Elbie Odendaal (South Africa) Christo Kuun	(United Kingdom) Ford Escort Mexico	
Retired			3	62	(France) Thierry Sabine (France) Pierre Terry	(France) Alpine-Renault A110 1600	
Retired			1	64	(Socialist Federal Republic of Yugoslavia) Borivoj Kresnik (Socialist Federal Republic of Yugoslavia) Doko Novaković	(Germany) BMW 2002 Ti	
Retired			2	67	(France) Francis Serpaggi (France) Jean Sialelli	(France) Alpine-Renault A110 1800	
Retired			2	70	(Germany) Hans Schüller (Germany) Hermann Weidmann	(France) Renault 12 Gordini	
Retired			1	71	(France) Noël Labaune (France) Jean L. Maurin	(Italy) Alfa Romeo 2000 GTV	
Retired			1	73	(Denmark) Hans Henrik Andersen (Norway) Terje Austad	(Germany) BMW 2800 CS	
Retired			2	77	(Poland) Andrzej Jaroszewicz (Poland) Andrzej Szulc	(Poland) Polski Fiat 125p	
Retired			1	78	(Italy) Alberto Brambilla (Italy) Federico Bettoni	(Germany) Opel Ascona SR	
Retired			4	82	(Italy) Umberto de Bonis (Italy) Maria T. Pelossa	(France) Alpine-Renault A110 1600	
Retired			2	84	(Poland) Maciej Stawowiak (Poland) Lech Jaworowicz	(Poland) Polski Fiat 125p	
Retired			2	85	(Germany) Thomas Teves (Germany) J. Leowenhardt	(Germany) Opel Ascona	
Retired			2	87	(Germany) Jochen Schweiger (Germany) Jürgen Säckl	(Germany) BMW 2002 Ti	
Retired			2	88	(Norway) Leif Vold-Johansen (Norway) Knut Steen	(Sweden) Saab 96 V4	
Retired			3	90	(France) Gérard Dantan-Merlin (France) Vincent Laverne	(Germany) Porsche 911 S 2.4	
Retired			2	92	(Germany) Norbert Ullemeyer (Germany) Klaus Kaltenbach	(Germany) BMW 2002 Ti	
Retired			2	93	(East Germany) Hans Ullmann (East Germany) Werner Lange	(East Germany) Trabant P601	
Retired			1	94	(Italy) Fulvio Rubbieri (Italy) Giorgio Bottai	(Germany) Opel Ascona SR	
Retired			1	95	(Italy) Leo Pittoni (Italy) Guido Braschi	(Italy) Fiat 124	
Retired			1	96	(East Germany) Egon Culmbacher (East Germany) Werner Ernst	(East Germany) Wartburg 353	
Retired			2	97	(Japan) Yoshinori Yamaguchi (Japan) Yoshikasu Nakajima	(Japan) Toyota Celica 1600	
Retired			2	98	(France) Francis Dubler-Gestro (France) Paul Brossin	(France) Renault 12 Gordini	
Retired			2	99	(East Germany) Helmut Piehler (East Germany) Lothar Sachse	(East Germany) Trabant P601	
Retired			4	100	(Italy) Domenico Lo Bello (Italy) Ricardo Carafa	(Italy) Lancia Fulvia 1.6 Coupé HF	
Retired			2	101	(Spain) Ramón Grifoll Oliva (Spain) Pedro Ferraté	(Spain) BLMC Austin Victoria	
Retired			2	102	(East Germany) Karlfried Weigert (East Germany) Bernhard Malsch	(East Germany) Wartburg 353	
Retired			4	103	(Germany) Detlef Mühleck (Germany) Siegfried Zepfel	(Germany) Porsche 911 S	
Retired			2	105	(France) Alain Follin (France) Christian Schilder	(France) Simca Rallye 2	
Retired			2	106	(East Germany) Franz Galle (East Germany) Jochen Müller	(East Germany) Trabant P601	
Retired			1	107	(Germany) Gerhard Gottlieb (Germany) Horst Hartsch	(Germany) BMW 2002 Ti	
Retired			1	108	(France) Jean-Pierre Rouget (France) Ginette Derolland	(United States) Chevrolet Camaro Z28	
Retired			3	109	(France) Christian Dorche (Monaco) Jean Pallanca	(France) Alpine-Renault A110 1600	
Retired			1	110	(France) Patrick Beaudoin (France) Gérard Laborie	(Italy) Fiat 128 Coupé	
Retired			3	111	(Italy) Renzo Druetto (Italy) Renato Davico	(Italy) Lancia Fulvia	
Retired			2	112	(Germany) Heinz Gellert (Germany) Horst Bins	(United Kingdom) Ford Capri 2600 RS	
Retired			4	113	(Italy) Giancarlo Zunino (Italy) Pasqualino Scagliola	(France) Alpine-Renault A110 1600	
Retired			1	114	(France) Bernard Donguès (France) Christian Soulie	(Italy) Fiat 127	
Retired			2	115	(Monaco) Félix Capra (Monaco) Michel Peyret	(France) Renault 12 Gordini	
Retired			3	116	(Germany) Friedrich von der Leyen (Germany) Klaus Klingenberger	(France) Alpine-Renault A110 1600	
Retired			1	117	(Norway) Per A. Bakke (Norway) Egil Moreite	(Germany) Opel Ascona 1.9 SR	
Retired			3	118	(Italy) Maurizio Garavelli (Italy) Wainer Rivaroli	(France) Alpine-Renault A110	
Retired			2	119	(Monaco) Gabriel Ratto (Monaco) Albin Cuccinelli	(Japan) Datsun Cherry	
Retired			1	120	(Norway) Bjørn Harris Hansen (Norway) Per Siversten	(Sweden) Volvo 144S	
Retired			2	121	(Germany) Rudi Eberhardt (Germany) Wolfgang Druba	(Germany) BMW 2002 Ti	
Retired			1	122	(Norway) Monty Karlan (Norway) Arve Herstrøm	(United Kingdom) Ford Escort Mexico	
Retired			1	123	(Italy) Michele Avenoso (Italy) Alberto Corzino	(Italy) Fiat 128 Coupé	
Retired			2	124	(United Kingdom) Ronald Hancock (United Kingdom) James Gray	(United Kingdom) Ford Escort	
Retired			4	125	(Italy) Giangiacomo Oddero (Italy) G. Magnani	(France) Alpine-Renault A110 1600	
Retired			1	126	(Italy) Carlo Bianchi (Italy) Stefano Canella	(Italy) Fiat 128 Coupé	
Retired			3	127	(Germany) Horst Rack (Germany) Helmut Köhler	(Germany) Porsche 911S	
Retired				128	(Italy) Michele di Gioia (Italy) Luigi Mastrorosa	(Germany) Porsche 911T	
Retired			4	130	(Germany) Reiner Altenheimer (Germany) Willy Schleim	(Germany) Porsche 911S	
Retired			2	131	(Norway) Steinar Svendsen (Norway) Jan Gundersen	(France) Renault 12 Gordini	
Retired			2	132	(Germany) Heinz-Bernd Wessels (Germany) Lothar Siebert	(Italy) Alfa Romeo Giulia 1600 Super	
Retired			2	133	(France) Jose Piger (France) Jean Forestier	(Italy) Fiat 128 Sport	
Retired			2	134	(Spain) Jordi Marco Garcia (Spain) José Buixeda	(Germany) BMW 2002 Ti	
Retired			1	135	(Germany) Horst Rausch (Germany) Thomas Fischer	(Germany) BMW 2002 Ti	
Retired			1	137	(Monaco) Yves Carbonatto (Monaco) Jean-Guy Fedreghini	(France) Citroën DS 21	
Retired			1	138	(Monaco) Gérard Masset (Monaco) "Richard Lord"	(United Kingdom) Triumph 2.5PI	
Retired			1	139	(Italy) Valerio Morra (Italy) Claudio Ferri	(Italy) Fiat 128 Coupé	
Retired			1	140	(Germany) Hans-Leofrid Schürer (Germany) Rolf Welzenbach	(Germany) BMW 2002 Ti	
Retired			2	141	(Germany) Eugen Hesse (Germany) Arno Fischer	(France) Simca Rallye 2	
Retired			1	142	(Germany) Ingo Peters (Germany) K. Klockner R. Flieger	(Germany) Opel Kadett 1100	
Retired			2	143	(Italy) Giancarlo Monti (Italy) Walter Finzi	(Italy) Fiat 128 Coupé	
Retired			1	144	(Monaco) Roger Adonto (France) Patrick Pierron	(Germany) Audi 80	
Retired			2	147	(Germany) Klaus Miersch (Germany) Karlheinz Fröhlich	(Germany) Opel Ascona	
Retired			2	149	(France) Bruno Saby (France) Jacques Penon	(France) Renault 12 Gordini	
Retired			2	150	(Andorra) Antoni Puigdellivol Riberaygua (Andorra) Marcos Domenech	(Italy) Fiat 128 Rally	
Retired			3	151	(Italy) Sergio Rombolotti (Italy) Massimo Rombolotti	(France) Alpine-Renault A110 1600	
Retired			3	152	(France) Marc Gatez (France) Jean-Loup Carretero	(France) Alpine-Renault A110 1600	
Retired			1	153	(Monaco) Jean Taibi (France) Michèle Mouton	(France) Peugeot 304S	
Retired			3	154	(Italy) Bruno Quarti (Italy) Antonio Di Penta	(France) Alpine-Renault A110 1600	
Retired			1	156	(Italy) Antonio Ruggiero (Italy) Gerardo Leoncavallo	(Italy) Innocenti	
Retired			2	157	(United Kingdom) Edwin Hodson (United Kingdom) John Allen	(United Kingdom) Ford Capri 3000	
Retired			2	159	(Italy) Carmelo Rondinone	(Italy) Autobianchi	
Retired			2	160	(United Kingdom) Chris Wathen (United Kingdom) Tim Bosence	(United Kingdom) Ford Escort RS1600	
Retired			2	161	(France) Jean-Claude Masson (France) Jean-Paul Pourre	(Germany) Mercedes-Benz 280 E	
Retired			1	162	(France) Georges Alexandrovitch (France) Bernard Pujos	(Italy) Autobianchi A112	
Retired			2	163	(Andorra) Bonaventura Riberaygua Esteve (Andorra) Ferran Font Riudeubàs	(United Kingdom) Ford Escort 1600	
Retired			2	164	(Socialist Federal Republic of Yugoslavia) Mihalo Tatalović (Socialist Federal Republic of Yugoslavia) Pera Kolić	(United Kingdom) Ford Escort 1300	
Retired			2	165	(Italy) Gualberto Carducci (Italy) Alfonsa De Gregorio	(Italy) Fiat 128 Rally	
Retired			1	166	(Luxembourg) Norbert Huberty (Luxembourg) Albert Muller	(Italy) Fiat 128 Rally	
Retired			1	167	(Germany) Wilhelm Lyding (Germany) Otto Karl Klemenz	(Germany) Opel Ascona 1.6 SR	
Retired			1	168	(Germany) Hermann Schäfer (Germany) Dieter Norwig	(Germany) Opel Ascona 1.6 SR	
Retired			1	170	(Italy) Ettore Falchetti (Italy) Ludovico Cinotti	(France) Alpine-Renault A110 1600S	
Retired			1	171	(Norway) Richard Støen (Norway) Einar Nålby	(Germany) BMW 2002 Ti	
Retired			2	172	(Germany) Peter van Doornick (Germany) Peter Brink	(Germany) BMW 2800 CS	
Retired			4	173	(France) Georges Develay (France) René Develay	(France) Alpine-Renault A110 1800	
Retired			1	175	(Germany) Joachim Knollmann (Germany) Axel Krich	(Germany) Opel Ascona 1.9 SR	
Retired			1	176	(Denmark) Marius Carlsen (Denmark) Børge Pedersen	(Germany) Opel Ascona 1.9	
Retired			1	177	(France) Didier Ortion (France) Michel Beaud	(Italy) Autobianchi A112	
Retired			1	179	(Norway) Leif Sommer (Norway) Ole Kristian Knudtzen	(Germany) Opel Manta	
Retired			4	180	(France) Christian Vesque (France) André Fichter	(France) Alpine-Renault A110	
Retired			2	183	(Italy) Antonio Padolecchia (Italy) Mario Grilli	(Italy) Fiat 128 Coupé	
Retired			4	184	(Italy) Giorgio Schön (Italy) Emilio Baj Macario	(Germany) Porsche 911 S	
Retired			1	186	(Italy) Gianfranco Randetti (Italy) Lorenzo Migliorini	(France) Simca 1000	
Retired			1	187	(France) Jean-Pierre Turco (France) Michel Rambaldi	(Germany) Opel Ascona 1.9	
Retired			1	188	(Norway) Rune Val-Aksmar (Norway) Harry Olsen	(France) Citroën GS	
Retired			4	189	(Italy) Sergio Tacchini (Italy) Fregonaro Zanotti	(Italy) Fiat 124 Sport Spider	
Retired			1	190	(France) Maurice Jacot (France) François Perret	(Germany) Opel Kadett Rallye	
Retired			3	191	(Italy) Carlo Tormene (Italy) Tristano Tormene	(Germany) Porsche 911 S	
Retired			2	192	(France) Roger Vallet (France) Raymond Marescot	(France) Alpine-Renault A110 1600S	
Retired			2	193	(Denmark) Jens Winther (Denmark) Ebbe Lous	(Germany) BMW 2002 Ti	
Retired			2	194	(Canada) William Oliver (Canada) Douglas Rowe	(Italy) Alfa Romeo 1300	
Retired			2	195	(United Kingdom) Mike Dodds (United Kingdom) Brian Englefield	(United Kingdom) BMC Mini Cooper	
Retired			2	202	(United Kingdom) Michael Clarke (United Kingdom) Neil Inigo-Jones	(United Kingdom) Ford Escort	
Retired			2	203	(Germany) Eckhard Schimpf (Germany) Ernst-Johann Zauner	(United Kingdom) Ford Capri 2600 RS	
Retired			2	212	(United Kingdom) Tony Maslen (United Kingdom) David Higson	(United Kingdom) Ford Escort	
Retired			4	215	(France) Jacques Marquet (France) Dennis Gillet	(France) Alpine-Renault A110 1600	
Retired			2	229	(Spain) Salvador Servià (Spain) Montserrat Imbers	(Spain) SEAT 127	
Retired			2	230	(United Kingdom) Clive Roberts (United Kingdom) Michael Siveyer	(United Kingdom) Ford Escort	
Retired			2	255	(Germany) Wolfgang Stiller (Germany) Axel Wagener	(Germany) BMW 2002	
Retired			1	265	(Germany) Wolf-Dieter Giese (Germany) Günter Scheffel	(Germany) Opel Ascona SR	
Retired			1	274	(Germany) Friedhelm Gaupp (Germany) Peter Diekmann	(Germany) Opel Kadett Rallye	
Retired			2	277	(Germany) Jochi Kleint (Germany) Harry Zwiers	(United Kingdom) Ford Capri 2600	
Retired			3	310	(France) Christian Lorang (France) André Haller	(France) Alpine-Renault A110 1600	
* - Note: 7 teams retired during the final leg, but were still officially included in the final race classifications.

Source: Independent WRC archive, eWRC Results

== Special stages ==
The rally was cancelled after 3 stages due to road blocks.

Stage	Winners	Car	Time	Class Leader
SS1	Huberty / Muller	Fiat 128 Coupe	16:38.5	Huberty / Muller
SS2	Huberty / Muller	Fiat 128 Coupe	22:52.8	Huberty / Muller
SS3	Tuschy / Eibel	Fiat 128 Coupe	19:37.2	Huberty / Muller
SS4	Cancelled			—N/a

== Championship standings after the event ==
1973 World Rally Championship for Manufacturers points standings after round 1
After round 1		Team	Season end	
Position	Points	Team	Position	Points
1	20	(France) Alpine Renault	1	147
2	10	(United States) Ford	3	76
3	4	(Italy) Fiat	2	84
4	3	(Italy) Lancia	13	17
5	2	(Japan) Datsun	6	34
