= 1973 Rally of Morocco =

Rallying motorsport event

1973 Rally of Morocco 16th Rally of Morocco
Round 5 of the 1973 World Rally Championship season
← Previous event	Next event →
- Host country: Morocco
- Dates run: 8 May 1973 – 13 May 1973
- Start location: Rabat, Morocco
- Finish location: Casablanca, Morocco
- Stages: 27 (1,210 km; 750 miles)
- Stage surface: Asphalt and gravel
- Overall distance: 5,300 km (3,300 miles)

Statistics
- Crews: 66 at start, 13 at finish

Overall results
- Overall winner: (France) Bernard Darniche (France) Alain Mahé (France) Alpine Renault; Alpine Renault A110 1800

The 1973 Rally of Morocco (formally the 16th Rally of Morocco) was the fifth round of the inaugural World Rally Championship season. Run in mid-May between Morocco's two major cities, Rabat and Casablanca, the Rallye du Maroc was a very long stage rally covering more than 1200 km on both hard and soft surface roads.

== Report ==
In 1973, and for several years afterward, only manufacturers were given points for finishes in WRC events. Morocco represented a third win for the strong Alpine Renault A110 1800, though the Citroën DS 23 also made a strong showing.

== Results ==
1973 Rally of Morocco results
Finish		Total time	Group	Car #	Driver Co-driver	Car	Mfr. points
Overall	In group	Total time	Group	Car #	Driver Co-driver	Car	Mfr. points
1	1	15 h : 1 m : 22 s	4	1	(France) Bernard Darniche (France) Alain Mahé	(France) Alpine-Renault A110 1800	20
2	1	15 h : 20 m : 4 s	2	9	(France) Bob Neyret (France) Jacques Terramorsi	(France) Citroën DS 23	15
3	1	15 h : 34 m : 37 s	1	21	(Austria) Richard Bochnicek (Austria) Sepp-Dieter Kernmayer	(France) Citroën DS 23	
4	2	15 h : 39 m : 56 s	1	15	(France) Raymond Ponnelle (France) Pierre de Serpos	(France) Citroën DS 23	
5	2	15 h : 52 m : 0 s	4	4	(France) Jean-Pierre Nicolas (France) Michel Vial	(France) Alpine-Renault A110 1800	
6	3	15 h : 59 m : 43 s	4	6	(Sweden) Björn Waldegård (Sweden) Fergus Sager	(Italy) Fiat Abarth 124 Rallye	6
7	4	16 h : 18 m : 16 s	4	3	(France) Jean-Luc Thérier (Belgium) Christian Delferrier	(France) Alpine-Renault A110 1800	
8	2	16 h : 48 m : 26 s	2	7	(Morocco) Jean Deschazeaux (Morocco) Jean Plassard	(France) Citroën DS 23	
9	3	17 h : 53 m : 47 s	2	35	(Italy) Lorenzo Merlone (Italy) Riccardo Mortara	(Sweden) Volvo 142 S	2
10	3	18 h : 3 m : 33 s	1	25	(France) Claudine Trautmann (France) Marie-Pierre Palayer	(France) Peugeot 504	1
11	4	20 h : 18 m : 38 s	1	42	(France) Marc Gerenthon (France) Hélène Gerenthon	(Japan) Datsun 1600 SSS	
12	4	22 h : 47 m : 41 s	2	30	(France) Pierre Pagani (France) Jean-Claude Refuveille	(Germany) Volkswagen K 70	
Finished over the limit			2	46	(United Kingdom) Paul Hadley (United Kingdom) Dave Robson	(Germany) Opel Ascona SR	
Retired (mechanical)			4	2	(Finland) Rauno Aaltonen (United Kingdom) John Davenport	(Italy) Fiat Abarth 124 Rallye	
Retired (accident)			4	5	(Kenya) Shekhar Mehta (United Kingdom) Geraint Phillips	(Japan) Datsun 240Z	
Retired (mechanical)			2	8	(France) Bernard Consten (France) Gérard Flocon	(France) Peugeot 504	
Retired (mechanical)			2	10	(Finland) Hannu Mikkola (Finland) Atso Aho	(France) Peugeot 504	
Retired (mechanical)			2	11	(United Kingdom) Tony Fall (United Kingdom) Mike Wood	(France) Peugeot 504	
Retired (mechanical)			2	12	(France) Jean-François Piot (France) Jean De Alexandris	(France) Renault 12 Gordini	
Retired (mechanical)			2	13	(Finland) Timo Mäkinen (United Kingdom) Henry Liddon	(France) Peugeot 504	
Retired (mechanical)			4	16	(France) Marianne Hoepfner (France) Yveline Vanoni	(France) Alpine Renault A110 1800	
Retired (mechanical)			2	17	(Portugal) Francisco Romãozinho (Portugal) José Bernardo	(France) Citroën GS	
Retired (mechanical)			2	18	(France) Claude Laurent (France) Jacques Marché	(France) Citroën GS	
Retired (mechanical)			2	19	(France) Jean Guichet (France) Jean Todt	(France) Peugeot 504	

Source: Independent WRC archive

== Championship standings after the event ==
1973 World Rally Championship for Manufacturers points standings after round 5
After round 5		Team	Season end	
Position	Points	Team	Position	Points
1	72	(France) Alpine Renault	1	147
2	28	(Italy) Fiat	2	84
3	27	(France) Citroën	7	33
4	22	(Japan) Datsun	6	34
5	20	(Sweden) Saab	5	42
6	13	(Italy) Lancia	13	17
7	13	(France) Peugeot	16	13
8	12	(United States) Ford	3	76
9	8	(Germany) Porsche	9	27
10	6	(Germany) Volkswagen	15	15
11	5	(Germany) Opel	11	25
12	4	(Germany) BMW	8	28
12	4	(Japan) Mitsubishi	17	4
12	4	(Sweden) Volvo	4	44
15	3	(Czechoslovakia) Škoda	18	3
