= 1973 Tour de Corse =

Rallying motorsport event

1973 Tour de Corse 17th Tour de Corse
Round 13 of the 1973 World Rally Championship season
← Previous event
- Host country: France
- Rally base: Corsica, France
- Dates run: 1 December 1973 – 2 December 1973
- Stages: 21 (1,179.80 km; 733.09 miles)
- Stage surface: Tarmac
- Overall distance: 3,020 km (1,880 miles)

Statistics
- Crews: 50 at start, 22 at finish

Overall results
- Overall winner: (France) Jean-Pierre Nicolas (France) Michel Vial (France) Alpine-Renault; Alpine-Renault A110 1800

The 1973 Tour de Corse (formerly the 17th Tour de Corse) was the 13th round of the inaugural World Rally Championship season. It started in December in the County of Corsica in France, and the rally was run primarily on the road. Jean-Pierre Nicolas won the round with co-driver Michel Vial.

== Report ==
In 1973, the World Rally Championship finished with the Tour de Corse in Corsica. The race had 22 rounds, with Jean-Pierre Nicolas winning most of them.

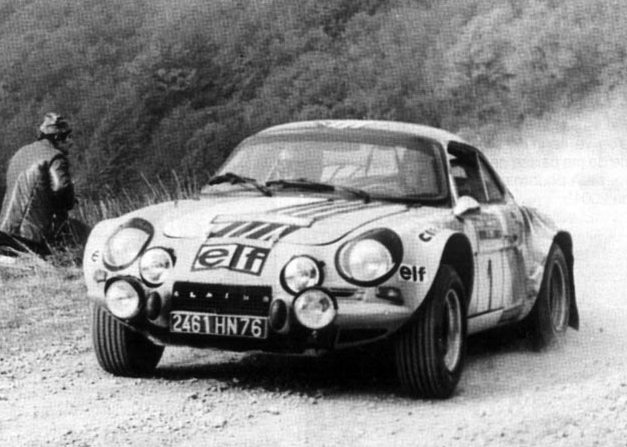
Jean-Luc Thérier driving in an Alpine-Renault A110 1800

Alpine, Ford, Opel, Porsche, Alfa Romeo, and Audi finished in the points.

== Results ==
1973 Tour de Corse results
Finish		Total time	Group	Car #	Driver Co-driver	Car	Mfr.points
Overall	In group	Total time	Group	Car #	Driver Co-driver	Car	Mfr.points
1	1	5 h : 06 m : 31 s	4	1	(France) Jean-Pierre Nicolas (France) Michel Vial	(France) Alpine-Renault A110 1800	20
2	2	5 h : 14 m : 37 s	4	5	(France) Jean-François Piot (France) Jean de Alexandris	(France) Alpine-Renault A110 1800	
3	3	5 h : 18 m : 46 s	4	7	(France) Jean-Luc Thérier (France) Marcel Callawaert	(France) Alpine-Renault A110 1800	
4	4	5 h : 21 m : 33 s	2		(France) Guy Chasseuil (France) Christian Baron	(United Kingdom) Ford Escort RS1600	10
5	5	5 h : 24 m : 37 s	4	11	(France) Francis Serpaggi (France) Félix Mariani	(France) Alpine-Renault A110 1800	
6	6	5 h : 27 m : 31 s	4	9	(France) Jean-Pierre Manzagol (France) Pierre Alessandri	(France) Alpine-Renault A110 1800	
7	7	5 h : 52 m : 11 s	1		(France) Henri Greder (Belgium) Christine Beckers	(Germany) Opel Commodore GS/E	4
8	8	5 h : 54 m : 13 s	3	40	(France) Gérard Dantan-Merlin (France) Vincent Laverne	(Germany) Porsche 911	3
9	9	6 h : 07 m : 48 s	1	21	(France) Jean-Claude Lagniez (France) Michel Thiery	(Italy) Alfa Romeo 2000 GTV	2
10	10	6 h : 17 m : 14 s	2	42	(France) Yves Évard (France) Gilbert Carraz	(Germany) Audi 80	1
11	11	6 h : 18 m : 43 s	1	52	(France) Bernard Picone (France) Davini Alex	(Germany) Opel Ascona	
12	12	6 h : 22 m : 31 s	4	25	(France) Robert Simonetti (France) Jean-Michel Simonetti	(France) Alpine-Renault A110 1800	
13	13	6 h : 26 m : 45 s	1	58	(France) Jérôme Chevanne (France) Lionel Boutin	(Germany) Opel Ascona	
14	14	6 h : 37 m : 38 s	2	64	(France) Jean Colombo (France) Daniel Dazin	(Germany) Opel Ascona	
15	15	6 h : 46 m : 33 s	1	53	(France) Pascal Santini (France) Vivarelli	(Germany) Opel Ascona	
16	16	6 h : 58 m : 35 s	1	22	(France) Jean-Louis Barailler (France) Jean-Paul Poggini	(Germany) Opel Ascona SR	
17	17	7 h : 05 m : 34 s	1	19	(France) Claude Ballot-Léna (France) Jean-Claude Morenas	(Italy) Alfa Romeo 2000 GTV	
18	18	7 h : 07 m : 17 s	3	33	(France) Christian Gardavot (France) Jean Ancey	(France) Alpine-Renault A110 1800	
19	19	7 h : 19 m : 36 s	3	36	(France) Michel Gordon (France) Mario Bastelica	(France) Alpine-Renault A110 1800	
20	20	7 h : 27 m : 19 s	3	32	(France) Jean-Claude Torre (France) Jean-Paul Poggini	(France) Alpine-Renault A110 1800	
21	21	7 h : 27 m : 41 s	2	47	(France) Brancaleoni (France) Marchioni	(Germany) Audi 80	
22	22	8 h : 11 m : 43 s	3	39	(Japan) Yuji Nishimura (Japan) Tanaka	(Japan) Datsun 240Z	
Retired (Differential)			4	3	(France) Bernard Darniche (France) Alain Mahe	(France) Alpine-Renault A110 1800	
Retired			3	10	(France) Michel Jullien (France) Bernard Pellegrin	(France) Alpine-Renault A110 1600	
Retired (Electrical Problem)			2	14	(France) Marie-Claude Beaumont (France) Marie-Odile Desvignes	(Germany) Opel Ascona	
Retired (Motor)			2	15	(France) Guy Fréquelin (France) Jean-Claude Marcoup	(Germany) Audi 80	
Retired (Suspension)			2	16	(France) Jean-Claude Gamet (France) Willy Huret	(United Kingdom) Ford Escort RS1600	
Retired (Transmission)			2	17	(France) Claude Laurent (France) Jacques Marché	(Netherlands) DAF 66	
Retired (Gear Box)			2	20	(France) Jean-Louis Clarr (France) Jacques Jaubert	(Germany) Opel Ascona	
Retired			4	24	(France) Rolland D'Abel de Libran (France) Jean-François du Roure	(France) Alpine-Renault A110 1600	
Retired			4	26	(France) Gilbert Casanova (France) Rolland	(France) Alpine-Renault A110	
Retired			4	28	(Italy) Angelo Corio (Italy) Emilio Corio	(Italy) Fiat 124 Abarth Spider	
Retired			4	29	(France) Georges Fantino (France) Jean-Pierre Lehideux	(France) Alpine-Renault A110	
Retired			4	31	(France) Pierre-Louis Moreau (France) Patrice Baron	(France) Alpine-Renault A110 1800	
Retired			3	34	(France) Christian Piot (France) Mattei	(France) Alpine-Renault A110 1600S	
Retired			3	37	(France) Gérard Morière (France) Bernard Ferrand	(France) Alpine-Renault A110	
Retired			2	41	(France) Yves Tillier (France) Hirtz	(United Kingdom) Ford Capri	
Retired			2	43	(France) Jean-Claude Briavoine (France) Laplanche	(United Kingdom) Ford Capri 2600 RS	
Retired			2	44	(France) Michel Robini (France) Guarnieri	(Germany) Opel Ascona	
Retired			2	45	(France) Philippe Mercier (France) P. Alberola	(Germany) Audi 80	
Retired			2	46	(France) Bonnet (France) Massoni	(Germany) BMW 2002	
Retired			2	48	(Monaco) Jean Taibi (France) Pierre Innocenti	(France) Peugeot 304	
Retired			2	50	(France) Jean-Paul Moreau (France) Jean-Paul Coquelet	(France) Simca Rallye 2	
Retired			2	51	(France) Charlotte (France) A. Hanriot	(France) Renault 12 Gordini	
Retired			1	54	(France) Pelli (France) Torre	(Germany) Opel	
Retired			1	56	(France) Delserre (France) Robini	(Germany) BMW 2002 Tii	
Retired			1	60	(France) Francis Vincent (France) Bernard Bontaz	(Italy) Alfa Romeo	
Retired			1	61	(France) Bernard Donguès (France) Hauduc	(Italy) Alfa Romeo	
Retired			???	62	(France) Michel Bour (France) Bruno Ferry	(France) Alpine-Renault A110	
Retired			???	63	(France) Philippe Farjon (France) Sonati	(France) Alpine-Renault A110	

== Championship standings ==
1973 World Rally Championship for Manufacturers points standings after round 13
After round 13		Team	Season end	
Position	Points	Team	Position	Points
1	147	(France) Alpine Renault	1	147
2	84	(Italy) Fiat	2	84
3	76	(United Kingdom) Ford	3	76
4	44	(Sweden) Volvo	4	44
5	42	(Sweden) Saab	5	42
6	34	(Japan) Datsun	6	34
7	33	(France) Citroën	7	33
8	28	(Germany) BMW	8	28
9	27	(Germany) Porsche	9	27
10	25	(Japan) Toyota	10	25
11	25	(Germany) Opel	11	25
12	18	(Poland) Polski Fiat	12	18
13	17	(Italy) Lancia	13	17
14	15	(East Germany) Wartburg	14	15
15	14	(Germany) Volkswagen	15	15
16	13	(France) Peugeot	16	13
17	4	(Japan) Mitsubishi	17	4
18	3	(Czechoslovakia) Škoda	18	3
19	2	(Italy) Alfa Romeo	19	2
20	2	(Germany) Audi	20	2
