= 1973 Acropolis Rally =

Rallying motorsport event

1973 Acropolis Rally 21st Acropolis Rally
Round 6 of the 1973 World Rally Championship season
← Previous event	Next event →
- Host country: Greece
- Rally base: Athens, Greece
- Dates run: 23 May 1973 – 28 May 1973
- Length: 549 km (341 miles)
- Stage surface: Gravel (some asphalt)
- Overall distance: 3,358 km (2,087 miles)

Statistics
- Crews: 83 at start, 11 at finish

Overall results
- Overall winner: (France) Jean-Luc Thérier (France) Christian Delferrier (France) Alpine Renault; Alpine Renault A110 1800

The 1973 Acropolis Rally (formally the 21st Acropolis Rally) was the sixth round of the inaugural World Rally Championship season. Run in late-May on the punishing hot gravel roads of central Greece, the Acropolis is a long-standing event on the WRC calendar.

== Report ==
In 1973, and for several years afterward, only manufacturers were given points for finishes in WRC events. In Greece, the Alpine Renault team had another strong showing, with their fourth win of the year. Driver Jean-Luc Thérier became the first driver to win two WRC rallies with his victory here.

== Results ==
1973 Acropolis Rally results
Finish		Total time	Group	Car #	Driver Co-driver	Car	Mfr. points
Overall	In group	Total time	Group	Car #	Driver Co-driver	Car	Mfr. points
1	1	7 h : 37 m : 58 s	4	1	(France) Jean-Luc Thérier (France) Christian Delferrier	(France) Alpine-Renault A110 1800	20
2	2	7 h : 44 m : 59 s	4	12	(Finland) Rauno Aaltonen (United Kingdom) Robin Turvey	(Italy) Fiat Abarth 124 Rallye	15
3	3	7 h : 45 m : 56 s	4	5	(France) Jean-Pierre Nicolas (France) Michel Vial	(France) Alpine-Renault A110 1800	
4	4	7 h : 57 m : 21 s	4	3	(Sweden) Håkan Lindberg (Sweden) Arne Hertz	(Italy) Fiat Abarth 124 Rallye	
5	1	8 h : 34 m : 57 s	2	19	(Austria) Georg Fischer (Austria) Hans Siebert	(Germany) Volkswagen 1303S	8
6	1	8 h : 40 m : 14 s	1	21	(Austria) Richard Bochnicek (Austria) Sepp-Dieter Kernmayer	(France) Citroën DS 23	6
7	2	8 h : 43 m : 26 s	2	9	(United Kingdom) Chris Sclater (Netherlands) Bob de Jong	(United Kingdom) Ford Escort RS1600	4
8	2	9 h : 40 m : 1 s	1	26	(Austria) Helmut Doppelreiter (Austria) Ossi Schurek	(Germany) Volkswagen 1303S	
9	3	9 h : 43 m : 47 s	2	42	(Greece) Ioánnis Psihas (Greece) Andreas Papatriantifillou	(Japan) Toyota Corolla	2
10	3	10 h : 16 m : 59 s	1	56	(Greece) Ioánnis Bardopoulos (Greece) Theodoros Karelas	(Germany) Audi 80 GL	1
11	4	11 h : 15 m : 11 s	2		(Sweden) Ted Hansson (Sweden) Mats Andersson	(Germany) Opel Ascona 19	
Retired (accident)			2	2	(Germany) Achim Warmbold (France) Jean Todt	(Germany) BMW 2002	
Retired (mechanical)			2	4	(Sweden) Ove Andersson (Sweden) Gunnar Häggborn	(Japan) Toyota Celica	
Retired (mechanical)			2	6	(Sweden) Björn Waldegård (Sweden) Fergus Sager	(Germany) BMW 2002	
Retired (mechanical)			2	7	(Sweden) Harry Källström (Sweden) Claes Billstam	(Germany) Volkswagen 1303S	
Retired (mechanical)			2	8	(Italy) Alcide Paganelli (Italy) Ninni Russo	(Italy) Fiat Abarth 124 Rallye	
Retired (illness)			4	10	(France) Bernard Darniche (France) Alain Mahé	(France) Alpine Renault A110 1800	
Retired (accident)			2	11	(Austria) Günther Janger (Austria) Harald Gottlieb	(Germany) Volkswagen 1303S	
Retired (mechanical)			2	15	(United Kingdom) Tony Fall (United Kingdom) Mike Wood	(Germany) Volkswagen 1303S	
Retired (mechanical)			2	16	(United Kingdom) Will Sparrow (United Kingdom) Henry Liddon	(United Kingdom) Ford Escort RS1600	
Retired (mechanical)			4	17	(Greece) Siroco (Greece) Miltos Andriopoulos	(France) Alpine Renault A110 1800	

Source: Independent WRC archive

== Championship standings after the event ==
1973 World Rally Championship for Manufacturers points standings after round 6
After round 6		Team	Season end	
Position	Points	Team	Position	Points
1	92	(France) Alpine Renault	1	147
2	43	(Italy) Fiat	2	84
3	33	(France) Citroën	7	33
4	22	(Japan) Datsun	6	34
5	20	(Sweden) Saab	5	42
6	16	(United States) Ford	3	76
7	14	(Germany) Volkswagen	15	15
8	13	(Italy) Lancia	13	17
9	13	(France) Peugeot	16	13
10	8	(Germany) Porsche	9	27
11	5	(Germany) Opel	11	25
12	4	(Germany) BMW	8	28
12	4	(Japan) Mitsubishi	17	4
12	4	(Sweden) Volvo	4	44
15	3	(Czechoslovakia) Škoda	18	3
16	2	(Japan) Toyota	10	25
17	1	(Germany) Audi	20	2
