= Alpine A110 =

Sports car produced by Renault in the 1960s and 1970s

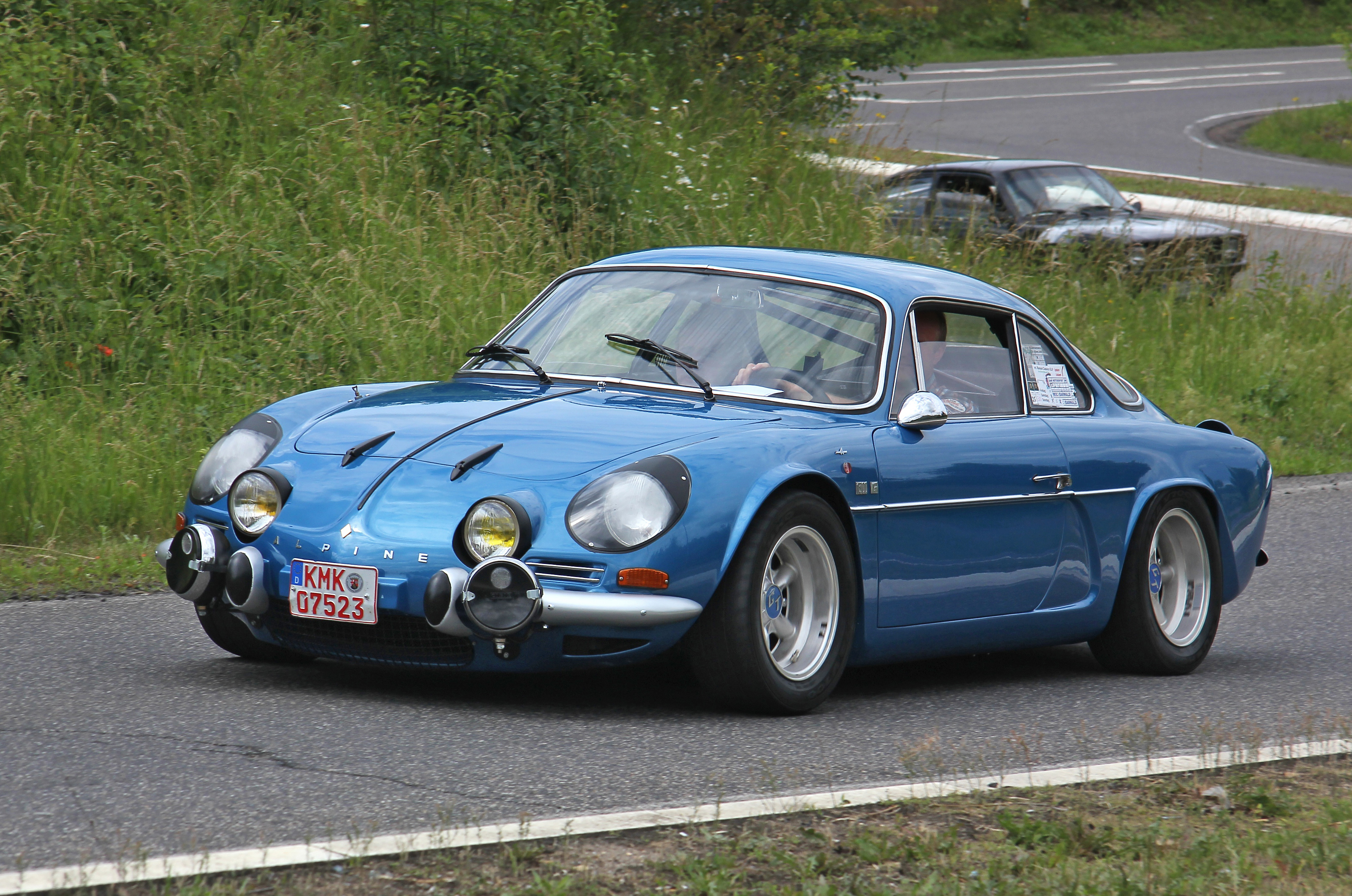
- A110 1300G

Overview
- Manufacturer: Alpine
- Production: 1963–1977
- Assembly: Dieppe, France
- Designer: Giovanni Michelotti

Body and chassis
- Class: Sports car (S)
- Body style: 2-door Berlinette
- Layout: Rear-engine, rear-wheel-drive

Powertrain
- Engine: 1.0–1.3 L Renault Cléon-Fonte I4; 1.5–1.65 L Renault Cléon-Alu I4
- Transmission: 5-speed manual

Dimensions
- Wheelbase: 2,099–2,180 mm (82.6–85.8 in)
- Length: 3,850 mm (152 in)
- Width: 1,471–1,550 mm (57.9–61.0 in)
- Curb weight: 706 kg (1,556 lb)

Chronology
- Predecessor: Alpine A108
- Successor: Alpine A310; Alpine A110 (2017) (spiritual)

The Alpine A110 is a sports car produced by French automobile manufacturer Alpine from 1963 to 1977. The car was styled as a "berlinetta", which in the post-WWII era refers to a small enclosed two-door berline, better-known as a coupé. The Alpine A110 succeeded the earlier A108. The car was powered by a succession of Renault engines. A car also named Alpine A110 was introduced in 2017.

The Alpine A110 experienced a remarkable evolution in terms of power output throughout its production years. Initially, the A110 had an output of just 51 horsepower, which was adequate for a car weighing only 620 kilograms. However, by the end of the A110's production run, its power output had increased to 180 horsepower. This impressive increase in power contributed to the car's success on the rally stages of Europe. The A110's crowning achievements included 1-2-3 finishes at both the 1971 and 1973 Monte Carlo rallies, and it used Renault 16 engines at the time. In 1973, Alpine won the inaugural manufacturer's World Rally Championship, defeating competitors such as Lancia, Porsche, and Ford.

However, by 1974, advances in rally competition led to a significant shift in the landscape of the sport, and the Alpine A110, which had become outdated, struggled to keep up with its rivals. As a result, sales of the A110 declined, prompting Renault to step in and purchase the company outright in an effort to save it. Despite being surpassed by newer rally cars, the A110's legacy as a successful and iconic rally car remains, and its victories in the early 1970s solidified its place in motorsport history.

== History ==
Alpine was founded by Jean Rédélé, a Frenchman based in Dieppe, who was an enthusiastic participant in rallying during the post-WWII era. Rédélé used Renault 4CVs and modified them for improved performance, including replacing the original three-speed gearbox with a five-speed manual transmission—a significant upgrade at the time. He also constructed new, lighter bodies to fit over the chassis and entered his modified vehicles in endurance races, including Le Mans and Sebring. Rédélé's success in rallying and continued improvement of Renault vehicles eventually gained the attention of Renault, leading to factory financial support. He formally established the Societe Anonyme des Automobiles Alpine and named the company "Alpine" as a tribute to his previous successes rallying in the Alps.

Launched in 1963, the A110, like previous road-going Alpines, used many Renault parts, including engines. While its predecessor the A108 was designed around Dauphine components, the A110 was updated to use R8 parts. Unlike the A108, which was available first as a cabriolet and only later as a coupé, the A110 was available first as a berlinette and then as a cabriolet. The most obvious external departure from the A108 coupé was a restyling of the rear bodywork. Done to accommodate the A110's larger engine, this change gave the car a more aggressive look. Like the A108, the A110 featured a steel backbone chassis and a fiberglass body. Alpine was a pioneer in the use of glass-fibre body panel construction, which was valued for its lightweight properties and malleability. This innovation allowed the company to produce its first proprietary body, the A106, which was placed on top of the old Renault 4CV chassis. The reduced weight of the body contributed to the car's success in rallying. Later, a cabriolet version was introduced, based on a stiff, tubular backbone chassis design that would become the foundation for all Alpines until the final production of the A610 in 1995.

The A110 was originally offered with 1.1 L R8 Major or R8 Gordini engines. The Gordini engine has a power output of 95 PS SAE (70 kW) at 6,500 rpm. Unlike most European manufacturers, Alpine stuck to the providing the more impressive seeming SAE power figures until well into the 1970s.

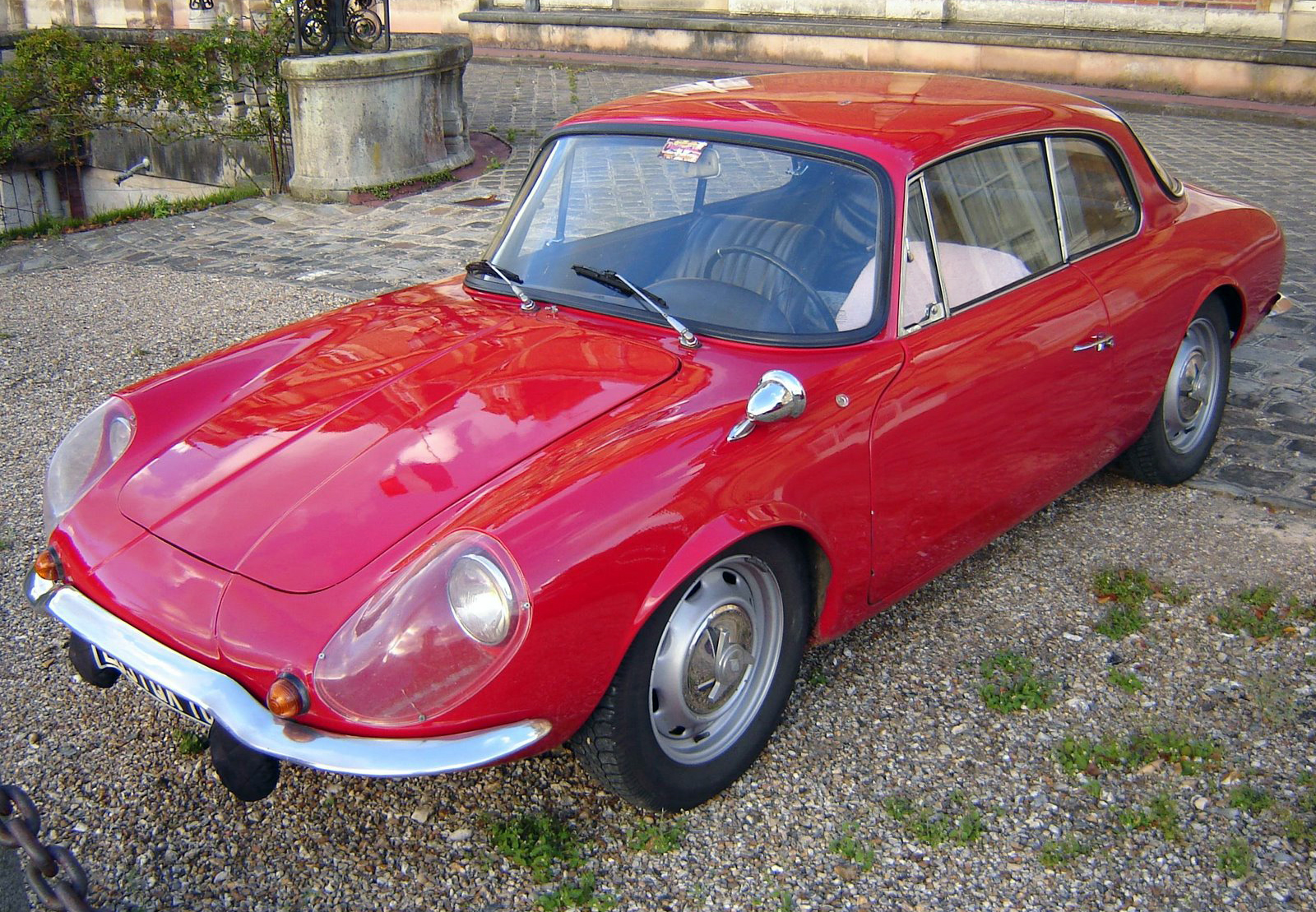
A110 GT4

The A110 achieved most of its fame in the early 1970s as a successful rally car. After winning several rallies in France in the late 1960s with the cast-iron R8 Gordini Cléon-Fonte engines the car was fitted with the aluminium-block Cléon-Alu from the Renault 16 TS. With two twin-venturi Weber 45 carburetors, the TS engine has a power output of 125 PS DIN (92 kW) at 6,000 rpm. This allowed the production 1600S to attain a top speed of 210 km/h (130 mph). The long-wheelbase Alpine A108 2+2 coupé was replaced with a new restyled 2+2 coupé based on the A110 mechanicals called the A110 GT4.

The car achieved international fame during the 1970–1972 seasons competing in the newly created International Championship for Manufacturers, winning events throughout Europe, and earning a reputation as one of the strongest rally cars of its time. Notable performances included a victory in the 1971 Monte Carlo Rally with Swedish driver Ove Andersson. Alpine also played a key role in Renault's entry into Formula One: During the 1970s, Alpine had been involved in Formula Three and Formula Two track-racing series and ultimately persuaded Renault to enter Formula One. Alpine had built a Formula One testing mule by 1976, leading to Renault's full-scale entry into the prestigious global motorsport category. This involvement marked one of Alpine's enduring legacies, as Renault continues to be active in Formula One to this day.

After Alpine's acquisition by Renault in 1971, the International Championship was replaced by the World Rally Championship for 1973, at which time Renault elected to compete with the A110. With a team featuring Bernard Darniche, Jean-Pierre Nicolas and Jean-Luc Thérier as permanent drivers and "guest stars" like Jean-Claude Andruet (who won the 1973 Monte Carlo Rally) the A110 won most of the races where the works team was entered, making Alpine the first World Rally Champion. Later competition-spec A110s received engines of up to 1.8 litres.

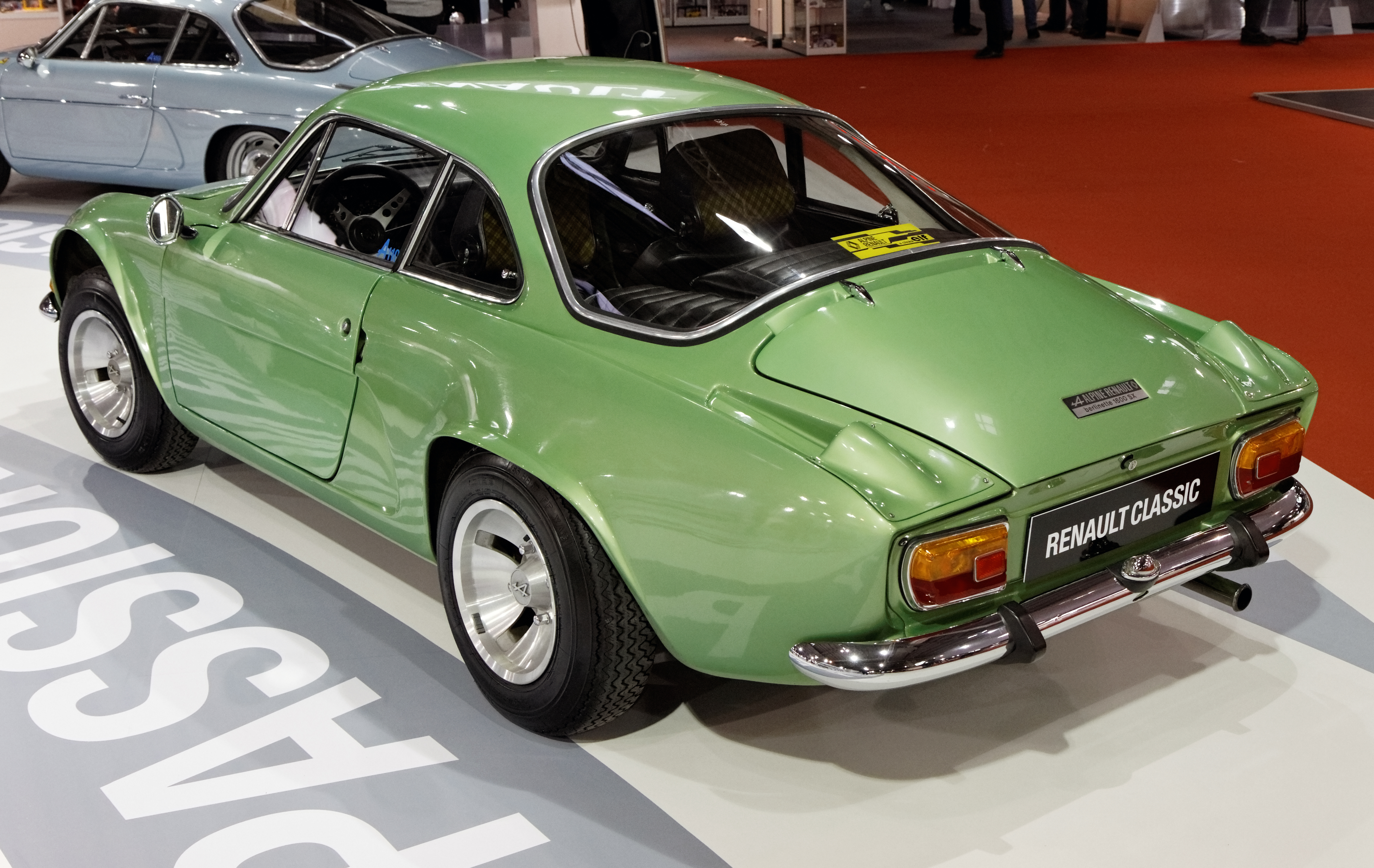
A110 1600SX

In addition to Alpine's own Dieppe factory, versions of the A110 were built under license by various other vehicle manufacturers around the world. From 1965 to 1974 the car was produced in Mexico under the name "Dinalpin" by Diesel Nacional (DINA), which also produced Renault vehicles. From 1967 to 1969, the A110 was also produced in Bulgaria under the name "Bulgaralpine" by a partnership formed between SPC Metalhim and ETO Bulet, whose collaboration also resulted in the production of the Bulgarrenault.

In Spain, the Alpine A110 was produced by FASA in Valladolid from 1967 to 1978. These were the only versions built outside France that were commercialised under the same names and to the same specifications as the French-built ones. FASA manufactured version A110 1100 (from 1967 to 1970) with 1108 cc engines, version A110 1300 (from 1971 to 1976) with 1289 cc engines, and version A110 1400 (from 1977 to 1978) with 1397 cc engines. 1,904 examples were built by FASA.

In 1974, the mid-engine Lancia Stratos which was the first car designed specifically for rally racing, was operational and homologated. At the same time it was obvious that the rear-engine A110 was nearing the limits of its development potential. The adoption of fuel injection brought no performance increase. On some cars, a DOHC 16-valve head was fitted to the engine, but it proved unreliable. Chassis modifications, such as the usage of the A310's double wishbone rear suspension, homologated with the A110 1600SC, also failed to increase performance. On the international stage the Stratos proved to be the "ultimate weapon", soon making the A110, as well as many other rally cars, obsolete. The A110 remains a staple of vintage racing events such as the Rallye Monte-Carlo Historique.

The Dieppe factory that served as the base for Jean Rédélé and Alpine continues to operate and produce cars. Notably, the legendary Renault 5 Turbo was built at the Dieppe factory. In more recent years, the factory became the headquarters of Renault Sport, where renowned performance cars such as the Clio 172, 182, Trophy, and the Megane R26.R and 275 Trophy R were designed and developed. This legacy of performance car development can be traced back to Dieppe and ultimately to the influence of Alpine and Rédélé.

In 2012, to mark the 50th anniversary of the A110, Renault produced a concept car called the A110-50. The modern production version of the A110 was introduced by Renault in 2017.

== Model changes ==
- October 1962: Prototype unveiled at Paris Show.
- June 1963: Production A110 launched with Renault 8-derived 956cc, 51 bhp engine, R8 four-speed gearbox and all-round disc brakes.
- October 1963: 1108cc, 66 bhp engine from R8 Major offered in V70 model, with new all-synchro four-speed gearbox.
- October 1964: 1108cc, 85 bhp twin-carb R8 Gordini engine in 85 model. Five-speed ‘box optional. Competition 1100 also launched with high-compression, 1108cc, 95bhp motor.
- June 1965: 1300 announced with 1296cc, 115bhp R8 Gordini motor: nearly all five-speed.
- October 1965: 956cc and 85 models deleted; 1108cc single-carb version renamed Standard. Chromed vents appear below headlights.
- June 1966: Production begins at FASA-Renault in Spain (cars have drum rear brakes).
- October 1966: Previous 1300 renamed Super, with extra 5bhp (to 120bhp) and five-speed. New 1300 has 1255cc, 105bhp R8 Gordini motor, and 1500 launched with 1470cc, 90bhp all-alloy motor from Renault 16. Twin Cibié driving lamps added to all models, and Renault badge appears on nose for first time.
- September 1968: 1500 superseded by 1600, with 92bhp R16TS 1565cc engine. 100 model deleted, along with Cabriolet and GT4 coupé.
- October 1969: 1600S has high-compression, modified R16TS engine running twin Webers 45 giving 138bhp and 132mph through five-speed ’box.
- January 1970: Four-speed base model: 1300cc V85, using R12 1289cc, 81 bhp motor. Five-speed 1300 and Super become 1300G and 1300S.
- October 1970: 1600 axed. Front indicators move from bumpers to wings on all cars. Group 4 1600S, with extra high-compression, 172bhp motor.
- March 1971: Spanish 1300, with all-disc brakes.
- October 1971: Range rationalised to 85 and 1600S models only.
- May 1973: New 1600S has 1605cc, 138bhp engine from A310. Five-speed ‘box standard.
- October 1973: Bodywork gains flush-fitting push-button door handles. 85 becomes 1300. 1600S given A310 four-stud alloy wheels, removable rear panel (added to 1300 in June "74), and rear suspension changed from swing axles to double wishbones. Two 1600 engines: SC with twin carbs and SI with Bosch fuel-injection. Group 4 rally 1600S replaced by 1800 (1798cc, 185bhp).
- October 1975: SX replaces 1600SC and SI, using 1647cc R16TX engine with single Weber carb. Chrome trim strips deleted.
- October 1976: 1600SX becomes only French A110, with ‘tape recorder’ alloys as used on Renault 5 Alpine.
- May 1977: Spanish 1300 replaced by 1400.
- July 1977: Production at Dieppe ceases after 7176 cars built.
- May 1978: Production ceases at FASA in Spain, where 1566 cars were made.

== Engines ==
The A110 was fitted with a variety of engines between 1963 and 1977. The Alpine A110, driven by Jean-Luc Therier, became the first vehicle ever to win an international rally with a turbocharged engine with its victory at the 1972 Criterium des Cevennes rally. This achievement predated the introduction of Audi's turbocharged Ur-Quattro by eight years. Engines used on production cars included the following:

Name	Year	Model	Engine description	Type	Displacement	Power
A110 956	1963–1965		R8 Cléon-Fonte	689	956 cc	55 PS SAE (40 kW)
A110 1100 "70"	1964–1969	1100 VA	R8 Major Cléon-Fonte	688	1,108 cc	66 PS SAE (49 kW)
A110 1100 "100"	1965–1968	1100 VB	R8 Gordini Cléon-Fonte	804	1,108 cc	95 PS SAE (70 kW)
A110 1300 "Super" / S	1966–1971	1300 VB	Tuned R8 Gordini Cléon-Fonte	804	1,296 cc	115 PS SAE (85 kW); 120 PS SAE (88 kW)
A110 1300 / 1300 G	1967–1971	1300 VA	Stock R8 Gordini 1300 Cléon-Fonte	812	1,255 cc	105 PS SAE (77 kW)
A110 1500	1967–1968	1500 VA	R16 Cléon-Alu from Lotus Europa	A1K	1,470 cc	82 PS SAE (60 kW)
A110 1600	1969–1970	1600 VA	Stock R16 TS Cléon-Alu	807-24	1,565 cc	92 PS SAE (68 kW); 102 PS SAE (75 kW)
A110 V85 / 1300	1970–1976	1300 VC	R12 TS Cléon-Fonte	810-30	1,289 cc	68 PS DIN (50 kW) (81 SAE)
A110 1600S	1970–1973	1600 VB	Tuned R16 TS Cléon-Alu	807-24	1,565 cc	125 PS DIN (92 kW) (138 SAE)
A110 1600S	1973–1975	1600 VC/SC	R17 TS Cléon-Alu	844–32	1,605 cc	126.5 PS DIN (93 kW) (140 SAE)
A110 1600S SI	1974–1975	1600 VD	R17 TS Cléon-Alu with fuel injection.	844-34	1,605 cc	128 PS DIN (94 kW) (140 SAE)
A110 1600S SX	1976–1977	1600 VH	Stock R16 TX Cléon-Alu	843	1,647 cc	93 PS DIN (68 kW)

== World Rally Championship victories ==
No.	Event	Season	Driver	Co-driver
1	(Monaco) 42ème Rallye Automobile de Monte-Carlo	1973	(France) Jean-Claude Andruet	(France) "Biche"
2	7º TAP Rallye de Portugal	1973	(France) Jean-Luc Thérier	(France) Jacques Jaubert
3	(Morocco) 16ème Rallye du Maroc	1973	(France) Bernard Darniche	(France) Alain Mahé
4	(Greece) 21st Acropolis Rally	1973	(France) Jean-Luc Thérier	(France) Christian Delferrier
5	(Italy) 15º Rallye Sanremo	1973	(France) Jean-Luc Thérier	(France) Jacques Jaubert
6	(France) 17ème Tour de Corse	1973	(France) Jean-Pierre Nicolas	(France) Michel Vial
