= Harry Källström =

Swedish rally driver (1939–2009)

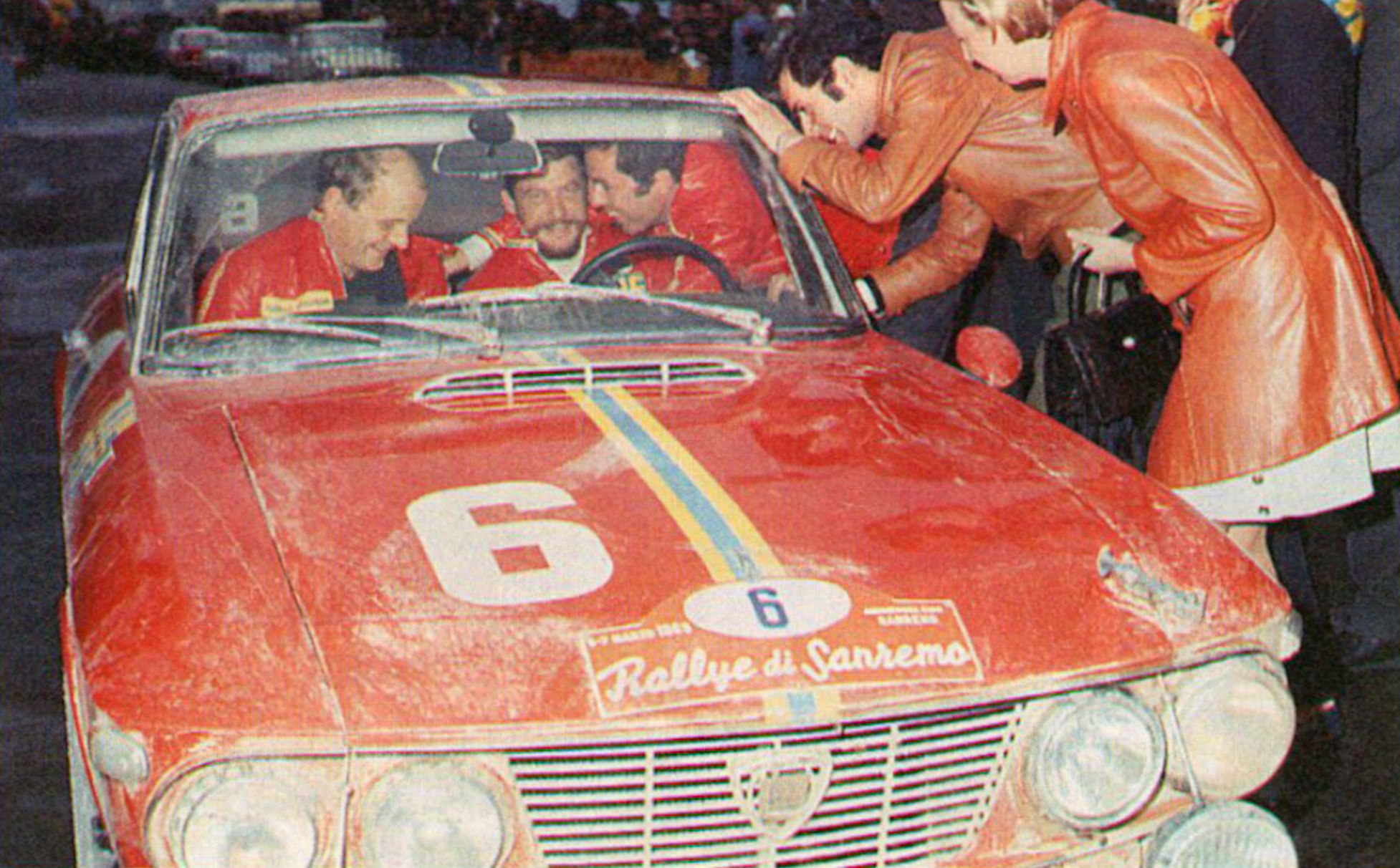
- Källström, inside his Lancia Fulvia 1.3 Coupé HFR, wins the 1969 Rallye Sanremo

Personal information
- Nationality: (Sweden) Swedish
- Born: 30 June 1939; Södertälje
- Died: 13 July 2009 (aged 70); Strömsund

World Rally Championship record
- Years active: 1973–1980
- Co-driver: (Sweden) Claes Billstam (Sweden) Sture Boström (Sweden) Michael Stedt (Sweden) Leif Lindqvist (Sweden) Claes-Göran Andersson (United Kingdom) Geraint Phillips (Sweden) Bo Thorszelius
- Teams: Lancia, Volkswagen, Datsun
- Rallies: 28
- Championships: 0
- Rally wins: 1
- Podiums: 4
- Stage wins: 4
- Total points: 18
- First rally: 1973 Monte Carlo Rally
- First win: 1976 Acropolis Rally
- Last rally: 1980 San Remo Rally

Harry Källström (30 June 1939 – 13 July 2009), nicknamed "Sputnik", was a Swedish professional rally driver who debuted in 1957 and competed in the World Rally Championship in the 1970s. Prior to the forming of the WRC, Källström won the RAC Rally in a Lancia Fulvia 1.6 Coupé HF in 1969 and 1970. In 1969, he also captured the European Rally Championship title.

Partnered with Claes-Göran Andersson, and driving a Datsun 160J, he took his only World Rally Championship victory at the 1976 Acropolis Rally Greece. At the same rally and in the same car, he finished third in 1977 and 1979.

His fourth podium appearance in the world championship was a second place at the 1973 Safari Rally in a Datsun 1800 SSS. This was the first WRC event to end in a dead heat; he and Shekhar Mehta ended on the same penalty points (6 hours and 46 minutes) but Mehta was awarded the win due to being the fastest in the opening stages. At the 1985 Rallye Côte d'Ivoire, Toyota teammates Juha Kankkunen and Björn Waldegård repeated this feat.

== Racing record ==
=== Complete IMC results ===
Year	Entrant	Car	1	2	3	4	5	6	7	8	9
1970	Lancia HF Squadra Corse	Lancia Fulvia 1.6 Coupé HF	MON; Ret	SWE; Ret	ITA; 2	KEN; Ret	AUT; 9	GRE	GBR; 1		
1971	Lancia HF Squadra Corse	Lancia Fulvia 1.6 Coupé HF	MON; Ret	SWE; 3	ITA	KEN; 8	MAR	AUT; Ret	GRE	FRA	GBR; 8
1972	Lancia HF Squadra Corse	Lancia Fulvia 1.6 Coupé HF	MON; Ret	SWE; 3	KEN	MAR	GRE; Ret	AUT; Ret	ITA; Ret	USA; Ret	GBR; 4

=== Complete WRC results ===
Year	Entrant	Car	1	2	3	4	5	6	7	8	9	10	11	12	13	WDC	Pts
1973	Lancia Marlboro	Lancia Fulvia 1.6 Coupé HF	MON; 8													N/A	N/A
1973	Lancia HF Squadra Corse	Lancia Fulvia 1.6 Coupé HF		SWE; 4												N/A	N/A
1973	Volkswagen / Porsche	Volkswagen 1302S			POR; Ret											N/A	N/A
1973	Nissan Motor Co. Ltd.	Datsun 1800 SSS				KEN; 2	MOR									N/A	N/A
1973	Harry Källström	Volkswagen 1303S						GRE; Ret	POL	FIN						N/A	N/A
1973	VW Porsche Austria	Volkswagen 1303S									AUT; 11	ITA	USA			N/A	N/A
1973	Datsun UK Ltd.	Datsun 240Z												GBR; 14	FRA	N/A	N/A
1974	Entreposto	Datsun 260Z	POR; 5													N/A	N/A
1974	Harry Källström	Datsun 260Z		KEN; 4												N/A	N/A
1974	Aro Yhtyma Oy Autokeskus	Datsun 160J			FIN; 21	ITA	CAN	USA								N/A	N/A
1974	Datsun Dealers	Datsun 160J							GBR; 15	FRA						N/A	N/A
1975	Datsuns Återförsäljarförening	Datsun 160J	MON	SWE; Ret												N/A	N/A
1975	Harry Källström	Datsun 160J			KEN; Ret	GRE	MOR	POR	FIN	ITA	FRA					N/A	N/A
1975	Old Woking Service Station	Datsun 160J										GBR; 11				N/A	N/A
1976	Harry Källström	Datsun 160J	MON	SWE	POR	KEN; 7										N/A	N/A
1976	Team Sanyo	Datsun 160J										GBR; Ret				N/A	N/A
1976	N.I. Theocharakis	Datsun Violet 160J					GRC; 1	MOR	FIN	ITA	FRA					N/A	N/A
1977	D.T. Dobie & Co	Datsun 160J	MON	SWE	POR	KEN; Ret	NZL									N/A	N/A
1977	N.I. Theocharakis	Datsun Violet 160J						GRC; 3	FIN	CAN	ITA	FRA	GBR			N/A	N/A
1978	D.T. Dobie & Co	Datsun 160J	MON	SWE	KEN; Ret	POR										N/A	N/A
1978	N.I. Theocharakis	Datsun 160J					GRE; 4	FIN	CAN	ITA	CIV	FRA	GBR			N/A	N/A
1979	Team Datsun Europe	Datsun 160J	MON	SWE; Ret	POR											18th	14
1979	D.T. Dobie / Team Datsun	Datsun 160J				KEN; 9										18th	14
1979	N.I. Theocharakis	Datsun 160J					GRE; 3	NZL	FIN	CAN	ITA	FRA	GBR	CIV		18th	14
1980	D.T. Dobie / Team Datsun	Datsun 160J	MON	SWE	POR	KEN; Ret										42nd	4
1980	N.I. Theocharakis	Datsun 160J					GRC; 7									42nd	4
1980	Nissan Motors	Datsun 160J						ARG; Ret	FIN	NZL						42nd	4
1980	Team Datsun Europe	Datsun Violet 160J									ITA; Ret	FRA	GBR	CIV		42nd	4

Sporting positions
Preceded by Pauli Toivonen	European Rally Champion; 1969	Succeeded by Jean-Claude Andruet
