= Christian Dorche =

French rally driver (1947–2025)

Personal information
- Nationality: (France) French
- Born: 27 January 1947; Gap, France
- Died: 8 July 2025 (aged 78); Orpierre, France

World Rally Championship record
- Years active: 1973–1985, 1987, 1993–1995
- Co-driver: (Monaco) Jean Pallanca (France) Pierre Gertosio (France) Bernard Richaud (France) Jean-Bernard Vieu (France) Charles Millon (France) Jean-François Fauchille (France) JP Gauthier (France) Bernard Martin-Dondoz (France) Patricia Trivero (France) Pierre Thimonier (France) Gilles Thimonier (France) Jacques Hénuset (France) Gérard Morin (Belgium) Leon Lejeune (France) Didier Breton (France) Thierry Barjou (France) Philippe Dubernard
- Teams: Citroën
- Rallies: 42
- Championships: 0
- Rally wins: 0
- Podiums: 0
- Stage wins: 0
- Total points: 7
- First rally: 1973 Monte Carlo Rally
- Last rally: 1995 Monte Carlo Rally

Christian Dorche (French: [kʁistjɑ̃ dɔʁʃ]; 27 January 1947 – 8 July 2025) was a French rally driver.

== Early life ==
Born in Gap on 27 January 1947, Dorche made his debut in 1969 in a Renault 8.

== Career ==
He participated in 42 rallies in the World Rally Championship and 18 editions of the Monte Carlo Rally. He achieved 5th place in the 1978 Tour de France Automobile. He won the dirt racing series of the 1986 French Rally Championship in a Citroën Visa.

== Death ==
Dorche died in Orpierre on 8 July 2025, at the age of 78.

== Racing record ==
=== Complete IMC results ===
Year	Entrant	Car	1	2	3	4	5	6	7	8	9
1971	Christian Dorche	Alpine-Renault A110 1600	MON; Ret	SWE	ITA	KEN	MAR	AUT	GRE	FRA	GBR
1972	Christian Dorche	Alpine-Renault A110 1600	MON; Ret	SWE	KEN	MAR	GRE	AUT	ITA	USA	GBR

=== Complete WRC results ===
Year	Entrant	Car	1	2	3	4	5	6	7	8	9	10	11	12	13	WDC	Pts
1973	Ecurie Monaco	Alpine-Renault A110 1600	MON; Ret	SWE	POR	KEN	MOR	GRE	POL	FIN	AUT					N/A	N/A
1973	Christian Dorche	Opel Ascona										ITA; 12	USA	GBR	FRA	N/A	N/A
1974	Christian Dorche	BMW 2002 Ti	POR	KEN	FIN; 56	ITA	CAN	USA	GBR	FRA						N/A	N/A
1975	Christian Dorche	BMW 2002 Ti	MON; 10	SWE	KEN	GRE	MOR	POR	FIN	ITA	FRA	GBR				N/A	N/A
1976	Christian Dorche	BMW 2002 Ti	MON; 13	SWE	POR	KEN	GRC	MOR	FIN	ITA	FRA	GBR				N/A	N/A
1977	Christian Dorche	BMW 2002 Ti	MON; DSQ	SWE	POR	KEN	NZL	GRC	FIN	CAN	ITA	FRA	GBR			N/A	N/A
1978	Christian Dorche	Opel Kadett GT/E	MON; 13	SWE	KEN	POR; 17	GRE	FIN	CAN	ITA	CIV					N/A	N/A
1978	Publimmo Racing	Opel Kadett GT/E										FRA; 10	GBR			N/A	N/A
1979	Christian Dorche	Opel Kadett GT/E	MON; Ret	SWE	POR	KEN	GRE	NZL	FIN	CAN	ITA		GBR; Ret	CIV		NC	0
1979	Christian Dorche	Peugeot 104 ZS										FRA; Ret				NC	0
1980	Christian Dorche	Peugeot 104 ZS	MON; Ret	SWE	POR	KEN										NC	0
1980	Christian Dorche	Peugeot 505 SRD					GRC; 25	ARG	FIN	NZL	ITA					NC	0
1980	Christian Dorche	Peugeot 505 STi										FRA; 15	GBR	CIV		NC	0
1981	Christian Dorche	Peugeot 505 STi	MON; 47													NC	0
1981	Christian Dorche	Peugeot 505 SRD		SWE; 60	POR	KEN										NC	0
1981	Christian Dorche	Peugeot 104 ZS					FRA; 16	GRC	ARG	BRA	FIN	ITA	CIV	GBR		NC	0
1982	Christian Dorche	Citroën Visa Trophée	MON; 49	SWE; 39	POR; 8	KEN	FRA; Ret	GRC; 12	NZL	BRA	FIN	ITA; Ret	CIV	GBR; 30		49th	3
1983	Christian Dorche	Citroën Visa 1000 Pistes												GBR; Ret		50th	2
1983	Christian Dorche	Citroën Visa Chrono	MON; Ret	SWE; 34			FRA; Ret					ITA; 19	CIV			50th	2
1983	Citroën Compétitions	Citroën Visa Chrono			POR; 13	KEN		GRC; Ret	NZL	ARG	FIN					50th	2
1984	Christian Dorche	Citroën Visa 1000 Pistes	MON; 13	SWE	POR; 9	KEN	FRA	GRC	NZL	ARG	FIN	ITA	CIV	GBR		53rd	2
1985	Christian Dorche	Citroën Visa 1000 Pistes	MON; 11	SWE	POR; Ret	KEN	FRA	GRC	NZL	ARG	FIN	ITA	CIV	GBR		NC	0
1987	Citroën Compétitions	Citroën Visa 1000 Pistes	MON; NC	SWE	POR; Ret	KEN	FRA	GRE; Ret	USA	NZL	ARG	FIN	CIV	ITA	GBR	NC	0
1993	Christian Dorche	Nissan Sunny GTI-R	MON; Ret	SWE	POR	KEN	FRA	GRE	ARG	NZL	FIN	AUS	ITA	ESP	GBR	NC	0
1994	Christian Dorche	Ford Escort RS Cosworth	MON; DSQ	POR	KEN	FRA	GRE	ARG	NZL	FIN	ITA	GBR				NC	0
1995	Christian Dorche	Ford Escort RS Cosworth	MON; Ret	SWE	POR	FRA	NZL	AUS	ESP	GBR						NC	0
