= Jean-Luc Thérier =

French rally driver (1945–2019)

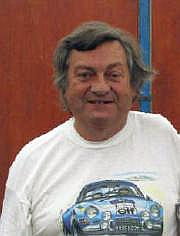
- Thérier in 2003

Personal information
- Nationality: (France) French
- Born: 7 October 1945; Hodeng-au-Bosc
- Died: 31 July 2019 (aged 73); Neufchâtel-en-Bray

World Rally Championship record
- Years active: 1973–1984
- Co-driver: (France) Marcel Callewaert (France) Jacques Jaubert (Belgium) Christian Delferier (France) Alain Mahé (France) Michel Vial (France) Vincent Laverne
- Teams: Alpine, Toyota, Porsche, Renault
- Rallies: 46
- Championships: 0
- Rally wins: 5
- Podiums: 10
- Stage wins: 61
- Total points: 42
- First rally: 1973 Monte Carlo Rally
- First win: 1973 Rallye de Portugal
- Last win: 1980 Tour de Corse
- Last rally: 1984 Monte Carlo Rally

Jean-Luc Thérier (7 October 1945 – 31 July 2019) was a French rally driver. He was the highest scoring driver in the inaugural World Rally Championship in 1973 and the only one to win three events. However, until 1977 the championship was only formally contested by manufacturers, not individuals, so only Thérier's Alpine-Renault team were formally awarded the title.

He most frequently competed in an Alpine Renault A110; the French often refer to him and his fellow drivers Jean-Pierre Nicolas, Bernard Darniche, and Jean-Claude Andruet as Les Mousquetiers ("The Musketeers").

== Career ==
Thérier's first international victory came at the wheel of an Alpine A110, at the Rallye Sanremo and the Acropolis Rally in 1970. He won the same two events again in 1973, along with the 1973 Rallye de Portugal, during his annus memorabilis. He also won the 1974 Press-on-Regardless Rally in the United States driving a Renault 17 Gordini, and the 1980 Tour de Corse behind the wheel of a Porsche 911 SC.

Thérier also won a half-dozen national, French rally titles. He participated at 24 Hours of Le Mans four times, failing to finish in 1967, 1969, and 1977, and finishing tenth in 1968 while winning the Index of Thermal Efficiency.

He participated in the Monte Carlo Rally 13 times between 1969 and 1984, with second place in 1971 as best result there. His career lasted until early 1985 when he suffered severe injuries while participating in the 1985 Paris to Dakar rally. He died on 31 July 2019 at the age of 73 after a long illness.

== Results ==
=== WRC victories ===
#	Event	Season	Co-driver	Car
1	7º TAP Rallye de Portugal	1973	Jacques Jaubert	Alpine-Renault A110 1800
2	(Greece) 21st Acropolis Rally	1973	Christian Delferier	Alpine-Renault A110 1800
3	(Italy) 15º Rallye Sanremo	1973	Jacques Jaubert	Alpine-Renault A110 1800
4	(United States) 26th Press-on-Regardless Rally	1974	Christian Delferier	Renault 17 Gordini
5	24ème Tour de Corse - Rallye de France	1980	Michel Vial	Porsche 911 SC

=== Complete IMC results ===
Year	Entrant	Car	1	2	3	4	5	6	7	8	9
1970	Alpine Renault	Alpine-Renault A110 1600	MON; Ret	SWE	ITA; 1	KEN	AUT; Ret	GRE; 1	GBR; Ret		
1971	Alpine Renault	Alpine-Renault A110 1600	MON; 2	SWE; Ret	ITA; Ret	KEN	MAR	AUT; Ret	GRE; Ret	FRA; Ret	GBR; Ret
1972	Alpine Renault	Alpine-Renault A110 1600	MON ?		KEN	MAR; Ret	GRE	AUT	ITA; Ret	USA	GBR
1972	Alpine Renault	Renault 12 Gordini		SWE; Ret							

=== Complete WRC results ===
Year	Entrant	Car	1	2	3	4	5	6	7	8	9	10	11	12	13	WDC	Points
1973	Alpine-Renault	Alpine-Renault A110 1800	MON; 5	SWE; 3	POR; 1	KEN		GRE; 1	POL; EX	FIN	AUT	ITA; 1	USA	GBR ret	FRA; 3	N/A	N/A
1973	Alpine-Renault	Alpine-Renault A110 1600S					MOR; 7									N/A	N/A
1974	Alpine-Renault	Alpine-Renault A110 1800	POR	KEN; Ret	FIN	ITA	CAN									N/A	N/A
1974	Alpine-Renault	Renault 17 Gordini						USA; 1	GBR							N/A	N/A
1974	Alpine-Renault	Alpine-Renault A310 1800								FRA; 3						N/A	N/A
1975	Alpine-Renault	Alpine-Renault A310 1800	MON; Ret	SWE							FRA; Ret	GBR				N/A	N/A
1975	Alpine-Renault	Alpine-Renault A110 1800			KEN; Ret	GRE	MOR	POR	FIN	ITA; 3						N/A	N/A
1976	Alpine-Renault	Alpine-Renault A310 1800	MON; Ret	SWE	POR	KEN	GRE	MOR	FIN	ITA	FRA					N/A	N/A
1976	Team Toyota	Toyota Celica 2000 GT (RA21)										GBR; Ret				N/A	N/A
1977	Team Toyota	Toyota Celica 2000 GT (RA21)	MON	SWE	POR	KEN	NZL	GRE	FIN	CAN	ITA	FRA; Ret	GBR; Ret			NC	0
1978	Toyota	Toyota Celica 2000 GT (RA21)	MON	SWE; OTL	KEN	POR; Ret	GRE; Ret	FIN	CAN	ITA	CIV					NC	0
1978	Toyota	Toyota Celica 2000 GT (RA40)											GBR; Ret			NC	0
1978	British Leyland Cars	Triumph TR7 V8										FRA; Ret				NC	0
1979	Cresson S.A.	Volkswagen Golf GTi	MON; 97													NC	0
1979	Toyota Team Europe	Toyota Celica 2000 GT (RA40)		SWE; Ret	POR; Ret	KEN	GRE; Ret	NZL	FIN	CAN	ITA	FRA	GBR; Ret	CIV; Ret		NC	0
1980	BP Racing Volkswagen Sport	Volkswagen Golf GTi	MON; Ret													12th	20
1980	Toyota Team Europe	Toyota Celica 2000 GT (RA40)		SWE	POR; Ret	KEN	GRE; Ret	ARG	FIN	NZL	ITA					12th	20
1980	Alméras/Esso	Porsche 911 SC										FRA; 1	GBR	CIV		12th	20
1981	Eminence Alméras	Porsche 911 SC	MON; 95	SWE	POR; Ret	KEN	FRA; Ret	GRE	ARG	BRA	FIN	ITA; Ret	CIV	GBR		NC	0
1982	Eminence Alméras	Porsche 911 SC	MON; 3	SWE	POR; Ret	KEN										15th	12
1982	Renault Elf	Renault 5 Turbo					FRA; Ret	GRE	NZL	BRA	FIN	ITA	CIV	GBR		15th	12
1983	Renault Elf	Renault 5 Turbo	MON; Ret	SWE	POR; Ret	KEN	FRA; Ret	GRE	NZL	ARG	FIN	ITA	CIV	GBR		NC	0
1984	Renault Elf	Renault 5 Turbo	MON; 4	SWE	POR	KEN	FRA	GRE	NZL	ARG	FIN	ITA	CIV	GBR		19th	10

Records
Preceded by None	Most rally wins 4 wins, 1st at the 1973 Rallye de Portugal	Succeeded by Sandro Munari; 7 wins, 5th at the 1976 Rallye de Portugal
