= Simo Lampinen =

Finnish rally driver (born 1943)

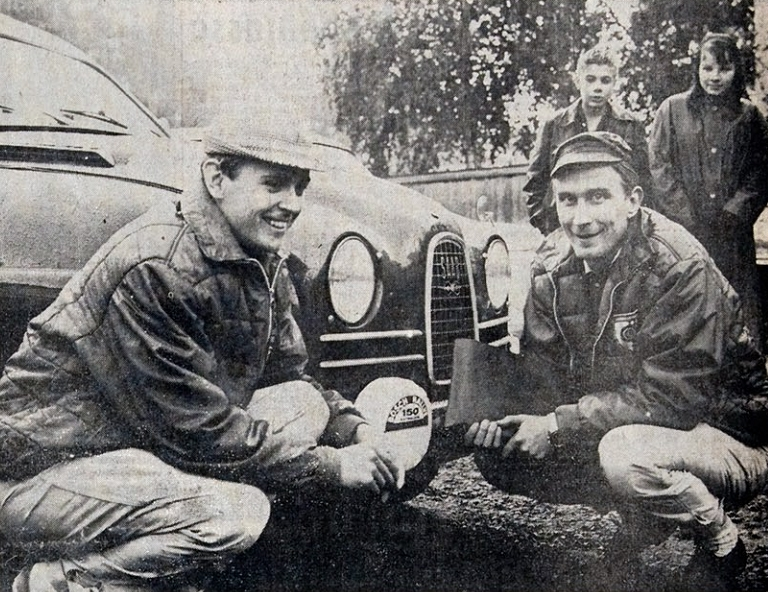
- Lampinen (left) at the 1964 1000 Lakes Rally with co-driver Jyrki Ahava

Personal information
- Nationality: (Finland) Finnish
- Born: 22 June 1943 (age 83); Porvoo, Finland

World Rally Championship record
- Years active: 1973–1979
- Co-driver: (Italy) Piero Sodano (United Kingdom) John Davenport (Sweden) Sölve Andreasson (Finland) Juhani Markkanen (Italy) Silvio Maiga (Sweden) Arne Hertz (Finland) Atso Aho (United Kingdom) Mike Wood (United Kingdom) Henry Liddon (United Kingdom) Mike Broad (United Kingdom) Fred Gallagher
- Teams: Lancia, Saab, Peugeot, Fiat, British Leyland
- Rallies: 35
- Championships: 0
- Rally wins: 0
- Podiums: 5
- Stage wins: 41
- Total points: 0
- First rally: 1973 Monte Carlo Rally
- Last rally: 1979 RAC Rally

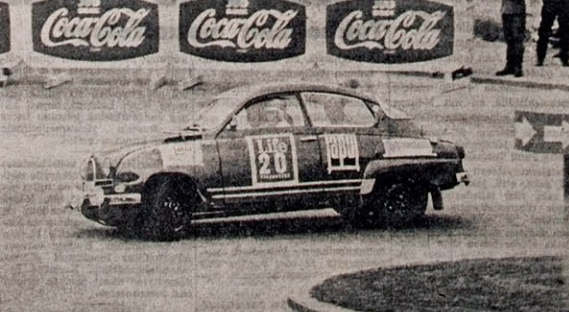
Lampinen drives a Saab Sport at the 1965 1000 Lakes

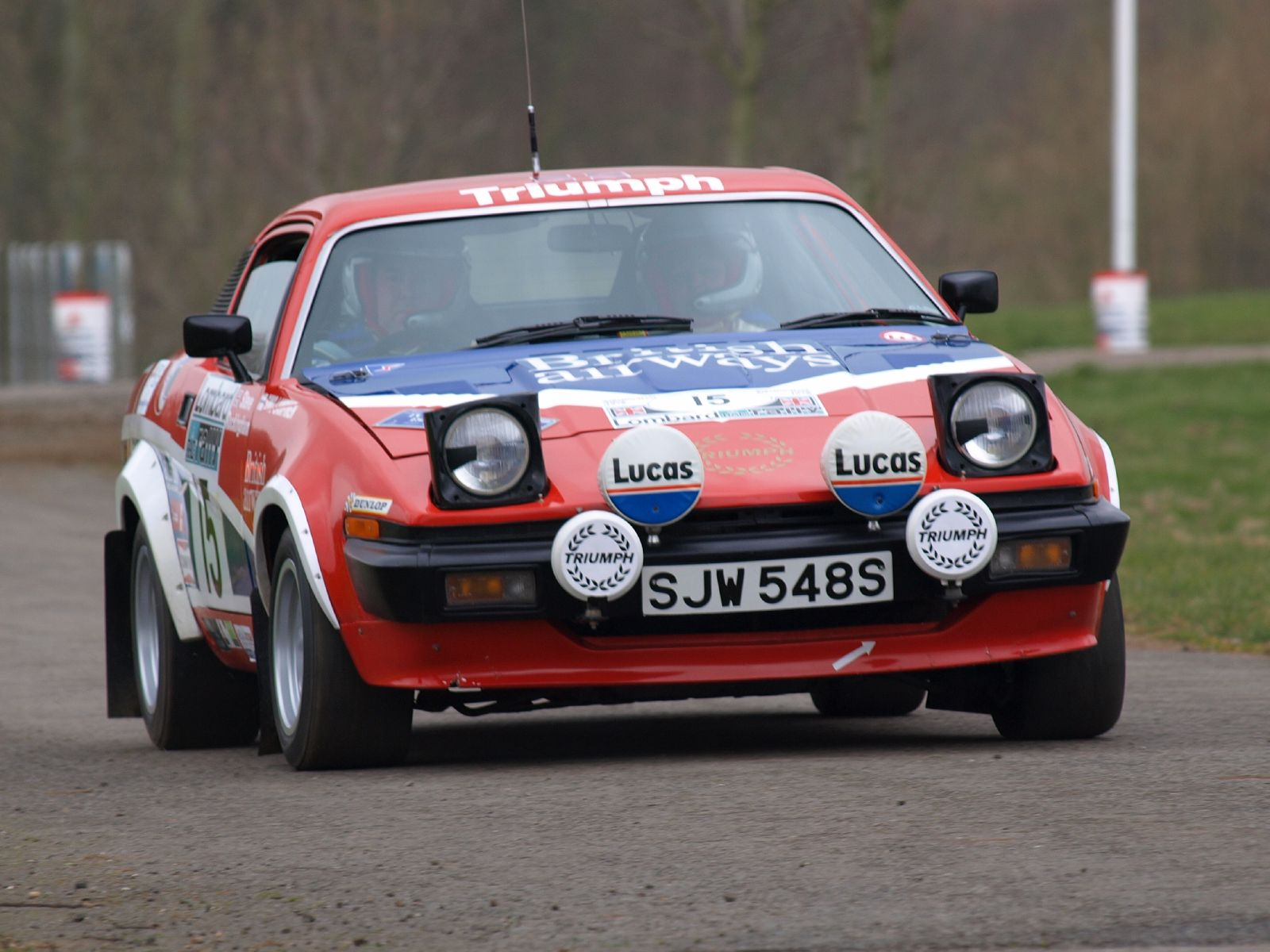
Lampinen's Triumph TR7 of the 1978 RAC Rally driven at the Race Retro 2008.

Simo Lampinen (born 22 June 1943) is a Finnish former rally driver, and one of the first of the "Flying Finns" who came to dominate the sport.

== Biography ==
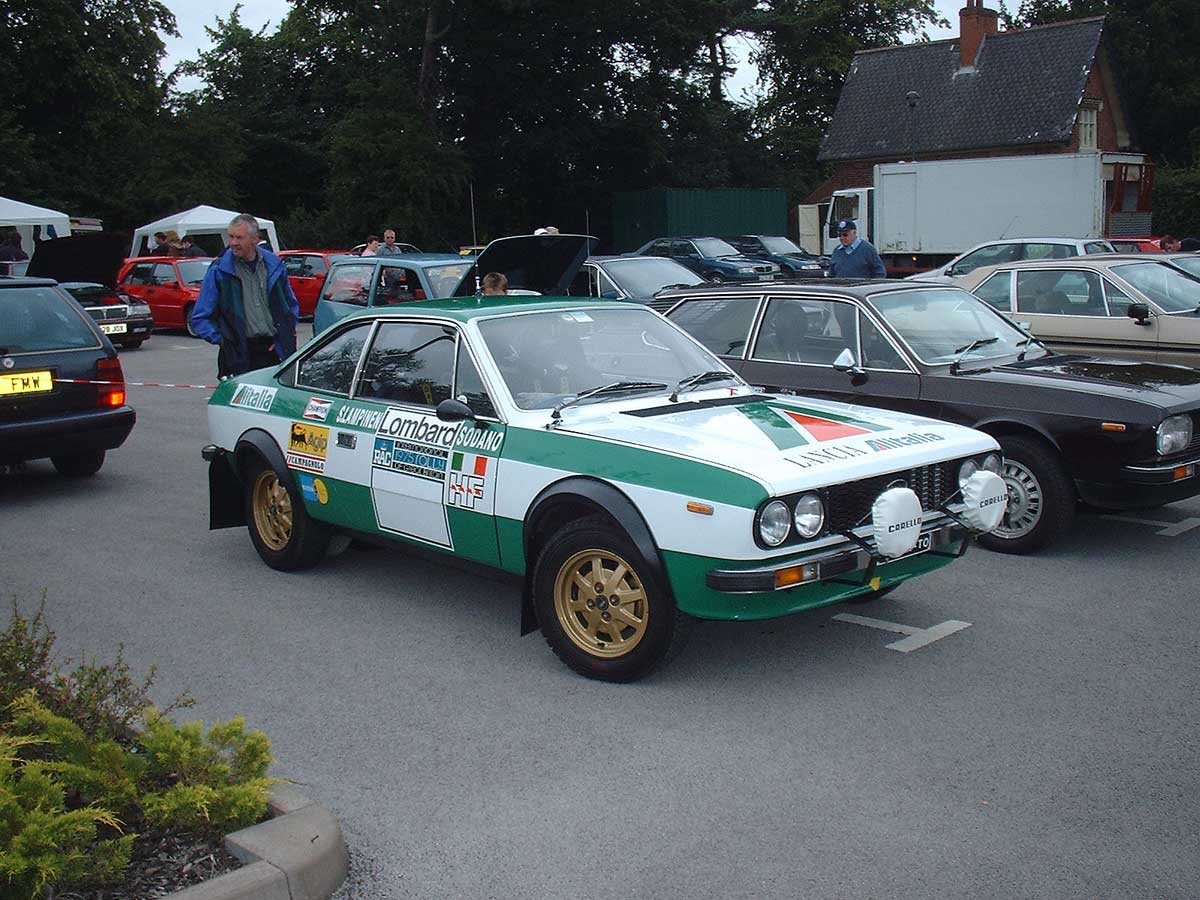
Lampinen's Lancia Beta Coupé of the 1975 RAC Rally.

Lampinen was born in Porvoo. Having contracted polio at a young age, he was left with a pronounced limp, and as a result he was granted a driving licence aged 17 so he could travel to and from school more easily. He quickly graduated to competitive driving, and won the Finnish Rally Championship twice in succession in 1963 and 1964.

Lampinen's early victories were in the Saab 96, before being lured to Lancia in 1970 where he continued his winning ways. He also drove for Peugeot, Fiat and Triumph, though without the same success.

More recently, Lampinen has been Clerk of the Course at the Rally Finland, the event he won three times himself, and he has also assisted Saab in two racing events; their Saab 900 Talladega Challenge in Alabama in 1996 where several speed records were set, and the 2000 Pikes Peak race, when Per Eklund won in a race-prepped Saab 9-3 Viggen.

== International victories ==
| # | Event | Season | Co-driver | Car |
|---|---|---|---|---|
| 1 | (Finland) 13th 1000 Lakes Rally | 1963 | Jyrki Ahava | Saab 96 |
| 2 | (Finland) 14th 1000 Lakes Rally | 1964 | Jyrki Ahava | Saab 96 |
| 3 | (United Kingdom) 17th RAC Rally | 1968 | John Davenport | Saab 96 V4 |
| 4 | 3º TAP Rallye de Portugal | 1970 | John Davenport | Lancia Fulvia 1.6 Coupé HF |
| 5 | (Austria) 7th Internationale Rallye der 1000 Minuten | 1970 | Mario Mannucci | Lancia Fulvia 1.6 Coupé HF |
| 6 | (Morocco) 15ème Rallye du Maroc | 1972 | Sölve Andreasson | Lancia Fulvia 1.6 Coupé HF |
| 7 | (Finland) 22nd 1000 Lakes Rally | 1972 | Klaus Sohlberg | Saab 96 V4 |
| 8 | (Finland) 10th Arctic Rally | 1975 | Juhani Markkanen | Saab 96 V4 |
| 9 | (Finland) 20th Hankiralli | 1975 | Juhani Markkanen | Saab 96 V4 |

== Racing record ==
=== Complete IMC results ===
| Year | Entrant | Car | 1 | 2 | 3 | 4 | 5 | 6 | 7 | 8 | 9 |
|---|---|---|---|---|---|---|---|---|---|---|---|
| 1970 | Lancia HF Squadra Corse | Lancia Fulvia 1.6 Coupé HF | MON; Ret | SWE; Ret | ITA; Ret | KEN; Ret | AUT; Ret | GRE | GBR; Ret | | |
| 1971 | Lancia HF Squadra Corse | Lancia Fulvia 1.6 Coupé HF | MON; 6 | SWE | ITA; Ret | KEN; Ret | MAR | AUT | GRE; 3 | FRA | GBR; 6 |
| 1972 | Lancia HF Squadra Corse | Lancia Fulvia 1.6 Coupé HF | MON; 4 | SWE | KEN | MAR; 1 | GRE; 2 | AUT; Ret | | | |
| 1972 | Lancia Marlboro | Lancia Fulvia 1.6 Coupé HF | | | | | | | ITA; Ret | USA | GBR; 5 |

=== Complete WRC results ===
| Year | Entrant | Car | 1 | 2 | 3 | 4 | 5 | 6 | 7 | 8 | 9 | 10 | 11 | 12 | 13 | WDC | Pts |
|---|---|---|---|---|---|---|---|---|---|---|---|---|---|---|---|---|---|
| 1973 | Lancia Marlboro | Lancia Fulvia 1.6 Coupé HF | MON; Ret | SWE | POR | KEN | MOR | GRE | POL | | | ITA; 8 | USA | | | N/A | N/A |
| 1973 | Saab | Saab 96 V4 | | | | | | | | FIN; 4 | AUT | | | GBR; Ret | FRA | N/A | N/A |
| 1974 | Saab Scania | Saab 96 V4 | POR | KEN | FIN; 5 | | | | | | | | | | | N/A | N/A |
| 1974 | Lancia Marlboro | Lancia Beta Coupé | | | | ITA; DSQ | CAN; 2 | USA; 4 | GBR; 10 | FRA | | | | | | N/A | N/A |
| 1975 | Lancia Alitalia | Lancia Beta Coupé | MON | SWE; 3 | KEN | GRE; Ret | MOR | POR | | ITA; Ret | FRA | GBR; 10 | | | | N/A | N/A |
| 1975 | Saab Scania | Saab 96 V4 | | | | | | | FIN; 2 | | | | | | | N/A | N/A |
| 1976 | Lancia Marlboro | Lancia Stratos HF | MON | SWE; 4 | POR | | | | | | | | | | | N/A | N/A |
| 1976 | Marshalls (EA) Ltd. | Peugeot 504 | | | | KEN; 5 | GRC | | | | | | | | | N/A | N/A |
| 1976 | Automobiles Peugeot | Peugeot 504 | | | | | | MOR; 2 | | | | | | | | N/A | N/A |
| 1976 | Saab Scania | Saab 96 V4 | | | | | | | FIN; 5 | ITA | FRA | | | | | N/A | N/A |
| 1976 | Simo Lampinen Racing | Ford Escort RS1800 | | | | | | | | | | GBR; Ret | | | | N/A | N/A |
| 1977 | Fiat Rallye Team | Fiat 131 Abarth | MON | SWE; 4 | POR | | NZL; 4 | GRC; 4 | | CAN; 2 | ITA | FRA | GBR; 7 | | | N/A | N/A |
| 1977 | Lancia Alitalia | Lancia Stratos HF | | | | KEN; Ret | | | | | | | | | | N/A | N/A |
| 1977 | Saab Scania | Saab 99 EMS | | | | | | | FIN; Ret | | | | | | | N/A | N/A |
| 1978 | Fiat Alitalia | Fiat 131 Abarth | MON | SWE; 6 | | | | | | | | | | | | N/A | N/A |
| 1978 | Autonovo Oy | Fiat 131 Abarth | | | | | | FIN; 5 | CAN | ITA | | | | | | N/A | N/A |
| 1978 | Marshalls (EA) Ltd. | Peugeot 504 V6 Coupé | | | KEN; 5 | POR | GRE | | | | | | | | | N/A | N/A |
| 1978 | Peugeot Esso | Peugeot 504 V6 Coupé | | | | | | | | | CIV; 4 | FRA | | | | N/A | N/A |
| 1978 | British Leyland Cars | Triumph TR7 V8 | | | | | | | | | | | GBR; Ret | | | N/A | N/A |
| 1979 | Marshalls (EA) Ltd. | Peugeot 504 V6 Coupé | MON | SWE | POR | KEN; Ret | GRE | NZL | | | | | | | | NC | 0 |
| 1979 | British Leyland Cars | Triumph TR7 V8 | | | | | | | FIN; Ret | CAN | ITA; Ret | FRA | GBR; 17 | CIV | | NC | 0 |
