= Heino Sepp =

Estonian rally driver (1936–2008)

Personal information
- Nationality: (Estonia) Estonian
- Born: 4 April 1936; Põlula, Estonia
- Died: 22 September 2008 (aged 72); Tallinn, Estonia

World Rally Championship record
- Years active: 1973
- Co-driver: (Estonia) Toomas Bernstein
- Teams: IZh
- Rallies: 1
- Championships: 0
- Rally wins: 0
- Podiums: 0
- Stage wins: 1
- Total points: 0
- First rally: 1973 Polish Rally
- Last rally: 1973 Polish Rally

Heino Sepp (4 April 1936 – 22 September 2008) was an Estonian rally driver. He is the first Estonian to compete in the World Rally Championship.

In 1969 to 1974 he was part of the USSR Team. He was the first Estonia to compete in World Rally Championship and gain a first stage win.

Sepp died in Tallinn on 22 September 2008, at the age of 72.

== Racing record ==
=== Complete WRC results ===
Year	Entrant	Car	1	2	3	4	5	6	7	8	9	10	11	12	13	WDC	Pts
1973	IZh	Moskvitch 412	MON	SWE	POR	KEN	MOR	GRE	POL; Ret	FIN	AUT	ITA	USA	GBR	FRA	N/A	N/A
