= Jean-Pierre Nicolas =

French rally driver (born 1945)

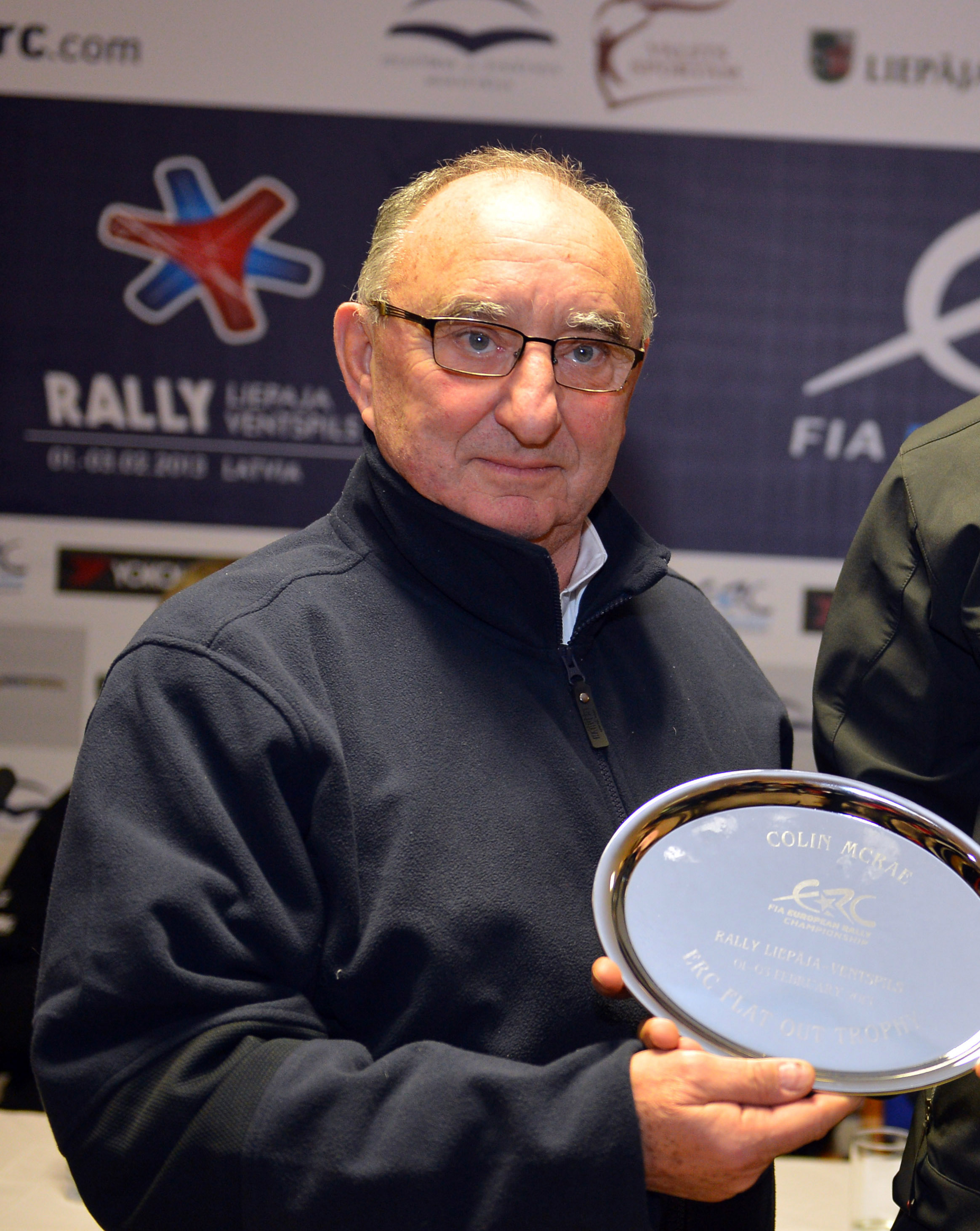
- Jean-Pierre Nicolas in 2014

Personal information
- Nationality: (France) French
- Born: 22 January 1945 (age 81); Marseille

World Rally Championship record
- Years active: 1973–1980, 1984
- Co-driver: (France) Michel Vial (France) Claude Roure (Belgium) Christian Delferier (United Kingdom) Geraint Phillips (France) Vincent Laverne (France) Jean-Claude Lèfebvre (France) Michel Gamet (France) Jean Todt (United Kingdom) Henry Liddon (France) Jean De Alexandris (France) Charley Pasquier
- Teams: Alpine Renault, Peugeot, Opel, Ford, Citroën, Porsche, Talbot
- Rallies: 40
- Championships: 0
- Rally wins: 5
- Podiums: 13
- Stage wins: 31
- Total points: 32
- First rally: 1973 Monte Carlo Rally
- First win: 1973 Tour de Corse
- Last win: 1978 Ivory Coast Rally
- Last rally: 1984 San Remo Rally

Jean-Pierre Nicolas (born 22 January 1945) is a French former rally driver who competed mainly in the 1970s.

== Rallying ==
Nicolas took five World Rally Championship event wins in the World Rally Championship. His best result in the drivers' championship was second with 31 points, after Markku Alén (53) and ahead of Hannu Mikkola (30), in the 1978 FIA Cup for Drivers.

Nicolas was born in Marseille. He was the Sporting Director for Peugeot in the WRC until 2005, around the time the 206 WRC and the short-lived factory-spec 307 WRC from 2004 to 2005 was the official works Peugeot car. He was then the FIA Intercontinental Rally Challenge's Motorsport Development Manager.

== Sportscars ==
Nicolas took part in the 1968 and 1969 24 Hours of Le Mans, both times driving an Alpine; in 1968, he and Jean-Claude Andruet finished 10th overall, and won the Index of Performance, but in 1969, teamed with Jean-Luc Thêrier and Henri Grandsire, the car retired at around half-distance.

== WRC wins ==
#	Event	Season	Co-driver	Car
1	(France) 17ème Tour de Corse	1973	Michel Vial	Alpine-Renault A110 1800
2	(Morocco) 19ème Rallye du Maroc	1976	Michel Gamet	Peugeot 504
3	(Monaco) 46ème Rallye Automobile de Monte-Carlo	1978	Vincent Laverne	Porsche 911
4	(Kenya) 26th Safari Rally	1978	Jean-Claude Lefèbvre	Peugeot 504 V6 Coupé
5	(Ivory Coast) 10ème Rallye Bandama Côte d'Ivoire	1978	Michel Gamet	Peugeot 504 V6 Coupé

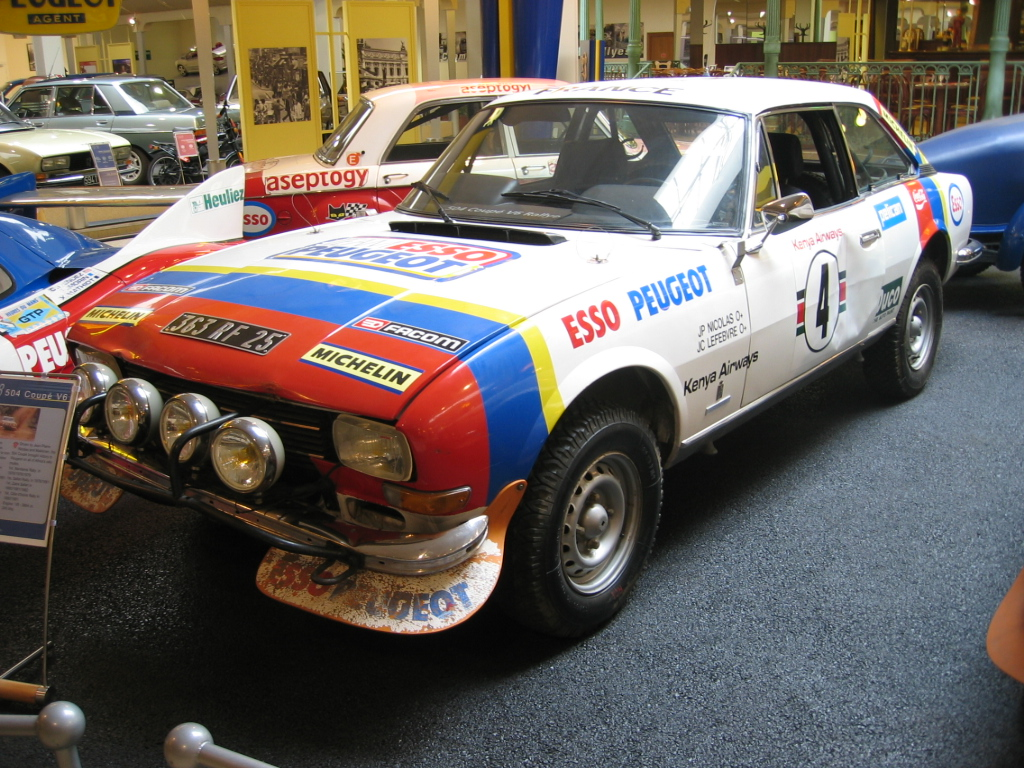
Nicolas and Jean-Claude Lefèbvre won the 26th Safari Rally in 1978 driving a Peugeot 504 V6 Coupé.

=== Complete IMC results ===
Year	Entrant	Car	1	2	3	4	5	6	7	8	9
1970	Alpine Renault	Alpine-Renault A110 1600	MON; 3	SWE; Ret	ITA; Ret	KEN	AUT	GRE; 6	GBR; Ret		
1971	Alpine Renault	Alpine-Renault A110 1600	MON; Ret	SWE	ITA; 6	KEN	MAR; Ret	AUT	GRE; 2	FRA; Ret	GBR
1972	Alpine Renault	Alpine-Renault A110 1800	MON; 33	SWE	KEN	MAR; Ret	GRE	AUT	ITA	USA	GBR

=== Complete WRC results ===
Year	Entrant	Car	1	2	3	4	5	6	7	8	9	10	11	12	13	WDC	Pts
1973	Alpine Renault	Alpine-Renault A110 1800	MON; 3		POR; 2	KEN	MOR; 5	GRE; 3	POL	FIN	AUT; 5	ITA; 3	USA	GBR; 5	FRA; 1	N/A	N/A
1973	Alpine Renault	Renault 12 Gordini		SWE; 14												N/A	N/A
1974	Alpine Renault	Renault 17 Gordini	POR	KEN; Ret	FIN	ITA	CAN	USA; 3	GBR							N/A	N/A
1974	Jean-Pierre Nicolas	Alpine-Renault A110 1800								FRA; 2						N/A	N/A
1975	Alpine Renault	Alpine-Renault A110 1800	MON; Ret	SWE	KEN	GRE	MOR	POR	FIN							N/A	N/A
1975	Jean-Pierre Nicolas	Alpine-Renault A110 1800								ITA; Ret	FRA; 2	GBR				N/A	N/A
1976	Jean-Pierre Nicolas	Alpine-Renault A310	MON; Ret	SWE	POR											N/A	N/A
1976	Marshalls (EA) Ltd.	Peugeot 504				KEN; 9	GRE									N/A	N/A
1976	Automobiles Peugeot	Peugeot 504						MOR; 1	FIN							N/A	N/A
1976	Opel Euro Händler Team	Opel Kadett GT/E								ITA; Ret	FRA; Ret	GBR				N/A	N/A
1977	Opel Euro Händler Team	Opel Kadett GT/E	MON; Ret	SWE	POR											N/A	N/A
1977	Marshalls (EA) Ltd.	Peugeot 504 V6 Coupé				KEN; Ret	NZL	GRE	FIN	CAN	ITA					N/A	N/A
1977	Ford Motor Company Ltd	Ford Escort RS1800										FRA; Ret				N/A	N/A
1977	Jean-Pierre Nicolas	Renault 5 Alpine											GBR; Ret			N/A	N/A
1978	Publimmo Racing	Porsche 911 Carrera RS	MON; 1	SWE												N/A	N/A
1978	Publimmo Racing	Ford Escort RS1800				POR; 3										N/A	N/A
1978	PCA / Total Oil	Ford Escort RS1800											GBR; 11			N/A	N/A
1978	Marshalls (EA) Ltd.	Peugeot 504 V6 Coupé			KEN; 1											N/A	N/A
1978	Peugeot Esso	Peugeot 504 V6 Coupé									CIV; 1					N/A	N/A
1978	Citroën Compétitions	Citroën CX 2400 GTI					GRE; Ret	FIN	CAN	ITA						N/A	N/A
1978	Opel Euro Händler Team	Opel Kadett GT/E										FRA; 7				N/A	N/A
1979	Porsche Alméras	Porsche 911 Carrera RS	MON; 6	SWE	POR											34th	6
1979	Marshalls (EA) Ltd.	Peugeot 504 V6 Coupé				KEN; Ret	GRE	NZL	FIN	CAN						34th	6
1979	Peugeot Esso	Peugeot 504 V6 Coupé												CIV; Ret		34th	6
1979	Talbot France	Talbot Sunbeam Lotus									ITA; Ret	FRA; Ret	GBR			34th	6
1980	Opel Euro Händler Team	Opel Ascona 400	MON	SWE	POR	KEN; 5	GRC	ARG	FIN	NZL	ITA	FRA	GBR	CIV		33rd	8
1984	Peugeot Talbot Sport	Peugeot 205 Turbo 16	MON	SWE	POR	KEN	FRA; 4	GRE; Ret	NZL	ARG	FIN	ITA; 5	CIV	GBR		14th	18
