= Österreichische Alpenfahrt =

The Österreichische Alpenfahrt (also known as the Austrian Alpine Rally or the Rally of Austria) was a rally that was part of the inaugural World Rally Championship in 1973.

== History ==
Modelled on the German Prinz-Heinrich-Fahrt, the Alpenfahrt was first run in 1910, making it older than the Rally Monte Carlo. The route across the Alps was considered one of the hardest rallies in Europe before World War I. The cars at this time were unreliable and mountain roads were sometimes no more than steep insecure paths. Nevertheless, between 1912 and 1914 Audi Type Cs (Alpensieger) proved reliable and rapid enough to win the rally in three successive years. In 1911, Ferdinand Porsche and Austro-Daimler were awarded the team prize.

The last rally for more than three decades took place in 1914. After the First World War, Austria couldn't finance the event alone, but with the participation of several automobile associations an Internationale Alpenfahrt rally could again be held from 1928 to 1936. The rally ran through Austria, France, Germany, Italy and Switzerland. After the Austrian Anschluss to Nazi Germany, two Internationale Deutsche Alpenfahrt competitions running from Munich to Vienna were held by the NSKK organization in 1938 and 1939.

The first Austrian Alpenfahrt after World War II started in 1949. Until around 1965 mostly motorcycles entered the Rally (due to economical reasons). From 1965 to 1973 cars regained the majority in the entry list. The 1973 Austrian Alpine Rally was part of the 1973 World Rally Championship, but after that year the Rally ceased to exist because of the Oil Crisis.

In 2002 an annual classic rally was restarted as Internationale Österreichische Alpenfahrt, which celebrated the centenary of the competition at Bad Kleinkirchheim, Carinthia in 2010.

== Winners ==
| Season | Winner | Car | Event report |
|---|---|---|---|
| 1973 | Achim Warmbold | BMW 2002tii | Report |

== Literature and sources ==
- Martin Pfundner: 100 Jahre Alpenfahrt, Böhlau Verlag, Wien-Köln-Weimar 2010 ISBN 978-3-205-78529-3
- Oswald, Werner (2001). Deutsche Autos 1920–1945, Band (vol) 2 (in German). Motorbuch Verlag. ISBN 3-613-02170-6.
