= International Championship for Manufacturers =

1970-1972 annual rallying championship series for rally car manufacturers

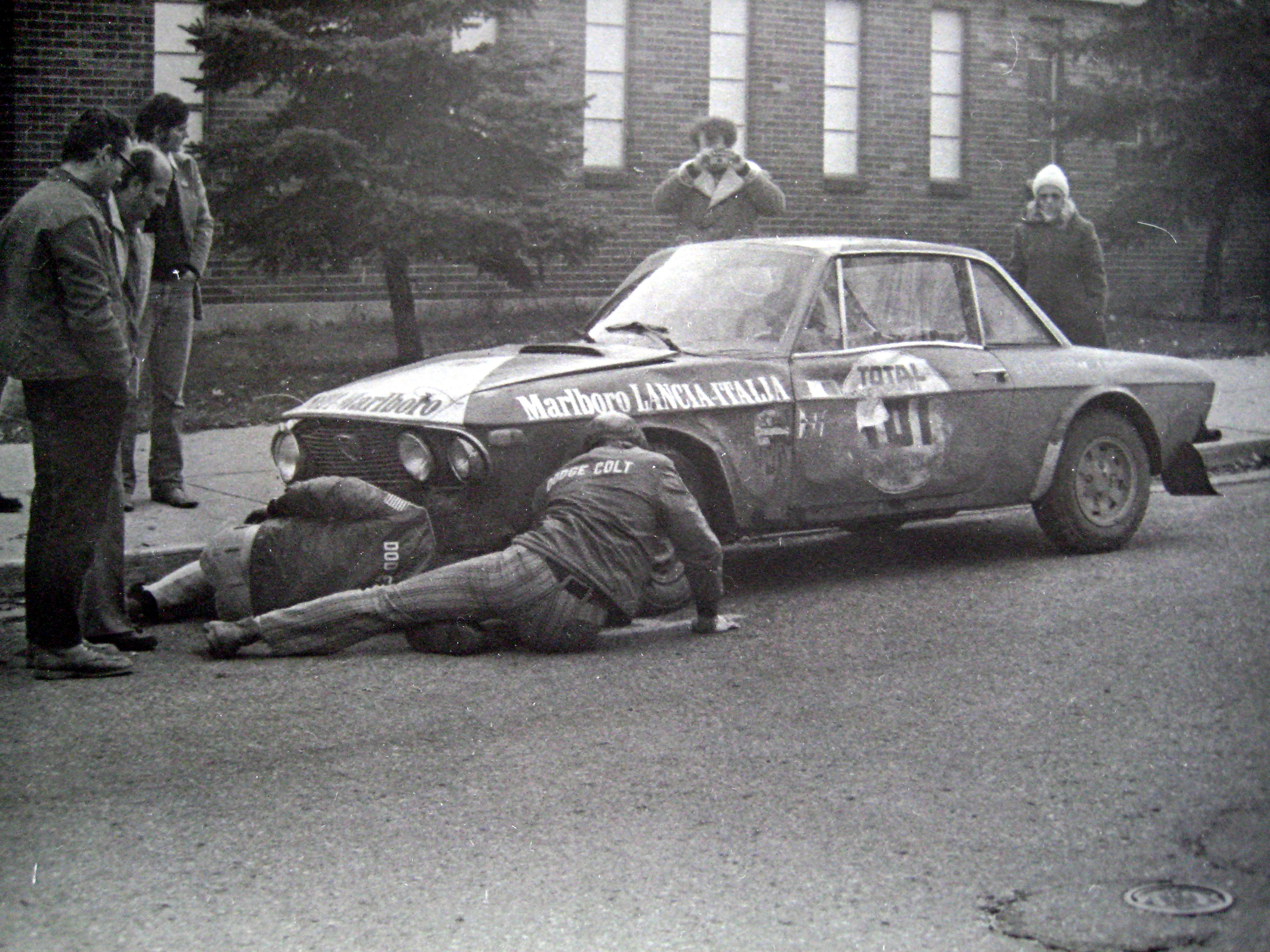
Harry Källström's Lancia Fulvia 1.6 Coupé HF at the 1972 Press-on-Regardless Rally.

The FIA International Championship for Manufacturers (IMC) was a rally series culminating in a champion manufacturer. The championship was run from 1970 to 1972 and it was replaced by the FIA World Rally Championship in 1973. All the nine rallies of the 1972 IMC season were part of the 1973 World Rally Championship season.

In the inaugural season, Porsche's Björn Waldegård drove his 911 S to victory at the Monte Carlo Rally, the Swedish Rally and the Österreichische Alpenfahrt. With Porsche leading Alpine-Renault by only three points before the season-ending RAC Rally, the championship went down to the wire. Alpine-Renault recruited Ove Andersson for the event, but he had an accident and retired. Alpine-Renault's best result was then Andrew Cowan's fifth place, and Porsche took the title. Porsche's Gérard Larrousse also picked up a point for sixth place.

In 1971, Alpine-Renault ran away with the title as Andersson won four of the eight events in the Alpine A110 1600. The Alpine-Renault, driven by Bernard Darniche, also won the last Coupe des Alpes, but because the event ran with an insufficient number of starters (36 when the FIA minimum was 50), no points were awarded towards the championship.

The final IMC title went to Lancia. The Fulvia 1.6 Coupé HF was driven by Simo Lampinen (35 points), Harry Källström (22) Sandro Munari (20) and Amilcare Ballestrieri (20). Fiat finished second in the standings with their 124 Sport Spider.

== 1970 ==
=== Events ===
Round	Event	Dates	Starters	Finishers	Winner	Car	Second	Car	Third	Car
1	(Monaco) Monte Carlo Rally	16–24 January	184	44	(Sweden) Björn Waldegård	Porsche 911 S	(France) Gérard Larrousse	Porsche 911 S	(France) Jean-Pierre Nicolas	Alpine-Renault A110 1300
2	(Sweden) Swedish Rally	11–15 February	120	31	(Sweden) Björn Waldegård	Porsche 911 S	(Sweden) Stig Blomqvist	Saab 96 V4	(Sweden) Lillebror Nasenius	Opel Kadett Rallye
3	(Italy) Rallye Sanremo	4–8 March	109	15	(France) Jean-Luc Thérier	Alpine-Renault A110 1600	(Sweden) Harry Källström	Lancia Fulvia 1.6 Coupé HF	(France) Jean Vinatier	Alpine-Renault A110 1600
4	(Kenya) Safari Rally	26–28 March	91	19	(Kenya) Edgar Herrmann	Datsun 1600 SSS	(Kenya) Joginder Singh	Datsun 1600 SSS	(Tanzania) Bert Shankland	Peugeot 504
5	(Austria) Österreichische Alpenfahrt	6–10 May	54	20	(Sweden) Björn Waldegård	Porsche 911 S	(Sweden) Håkan Lindberg	Saab 96 V4	(France) Jean-François Piot	Ford Escort Twin Cam
6	(Greece) Acropolis Rally	28–31 May	80	13	(France) Jean-Luc Thérier	Alpine-Renault A110 1600	(France) Jean Vinatier	Alpine-Renault A110 1600	(Sweden) Ove Andersson	Ford Escort Twin Cam
7	(United Kingdom) RAC Rally	13–18 November	196	67	(Sweden) Harry Källström	Lancia Fulvia 1.6 Coupé HF	(Sweden) Ove Eriksson	Opel Kadett Rallye	(Sweden) Lillebror Nasenius	Opel Kadett Rallye

=== Final standings ===
Pos	Manufacturer	MON (Monaco)	SWE (Sweden)	ITA (Italy)	KEN (Kenya)	AUT (Austria)	GRC (Greece)	GBR (United Kingdom)	Pts
1	(Germany) Porsche	9	9	–	–	9	–	1	28
2	(France) Alpine-Renault	4	–	9	–	2	9	2	26
3	(Italy) Lancia	1	–	6	–	–	–	9	16
4	(Sweden) Saab	–	6	3	–	6	–	–	15
5	(Germany) Opel	–	4	–	–	–	–	6	10
5	(United Kingdom) Ford	2	–	–	–	4	4	–	10
7	(Japan) Datsun	–	–	–	9	–	–	–	9
8	(France) Peugeot	–	–	–	4	–	–	–	4
9	(Italy) Fiat	–	–	1	–	–	2	–	3
10	(Sweden) Volvo	–	–	–	2	–	–	–	2
11	(Germany) BMW	–	1	–	–	–	–	–	1
11	(United Kingdom) Triumph	–	–	–	1	–	–	–	1
11	(Germany) Volkswagen	–	–	–	–	1	–	–	1

== 1971 ==
=== Events ===
Round	Event	Dates	Starters	Finishers	Winner	Car	Second	Car	Third	Car
1	(Monaco) Monte Carlo Rally	22–29 January	248	22	(Sweden) Ove Andersson	Alpine-Renault A110 1600	(France) Jean-Luc Thérier	Alpine-Renault A110 1600	(Sweden) Björn Waldegård	Porsche 914/6
2	(Sweden) Swedish Rally	17–21 February	112	53	(Sweden) Stig Blomqvist	Saab 96 V4	(Sweden) Lars Nyström	BMW 2002 Ti	(Sweden) Harry Källström	Lancia Fulvia 1.6 Coupé HF
3	(Italy) Rallye Sanremo	14–17 March	86	20	(Sweden) Ove Andersson	Alpine-Renault A110 1600	(Italy) Amilcare Ballestrieri	Lancia Fulvia 1.6 Coupé HF	(Italy) Sergio Barbasio	Lancia Fulvia 1.6 Coupé HF
4	(Kenya) Safari Rally	8–12 April	107	32	(Kenya) Edgar Herrmann	Datsun 240Z	(Kenya) Shekhar Mehta	Datsun 240Z	(Tanzania) Bert Shankland	Peugeot 504
5	(Morocco) Rallye du Maroc	28 April – 1 May	60	9	(Morocco) Jean Deschazeaux	Citroën SM	(France) Guy Chasseuil	Peugeot 504 Ti	(France) Bernard Consten	Citroën DS 21
6	(Austria) Österreichische Alpenfahrt	13–16 May	54	15	(Sweden) Ove Andersson	Alpine-Renault A110 1600	(Italy) Alcide Paganelli	Fiat 124 Sport Spider	(Austria) Klaus Russling	Volkswagen Käfer 1302 S
7	(Greece) Acropolis Rally	27–30 May	59	9	(Sweden) Ove Andersson	Alpine-Renault A110 1600	(France) Jean-Pierre Nicolas	Alpine-Renault A110 1600	(Finland) Simo Lampinen	Lancia Fulvia 1.6 Coupé HF
8	(France) Coupe des Alpes	21–26 June	36	11	(France) Bernard Darniche	Alpine-Renault A110 1600	(France) Jean Vinatier	Alpine-Renault A110 1800	(France) Jean-François Piot	Ford Escort RS 1600
9	(United Kingdom) RAC Rally	20–25 November	231	104	(Sweden) Stig Blomqvist	Saab 96 V4	(Sweden) Björn Waldegård	Porsche 911 S	(Sweden) Carl Orrenius	Saab 96 V4

=== Final standings ===
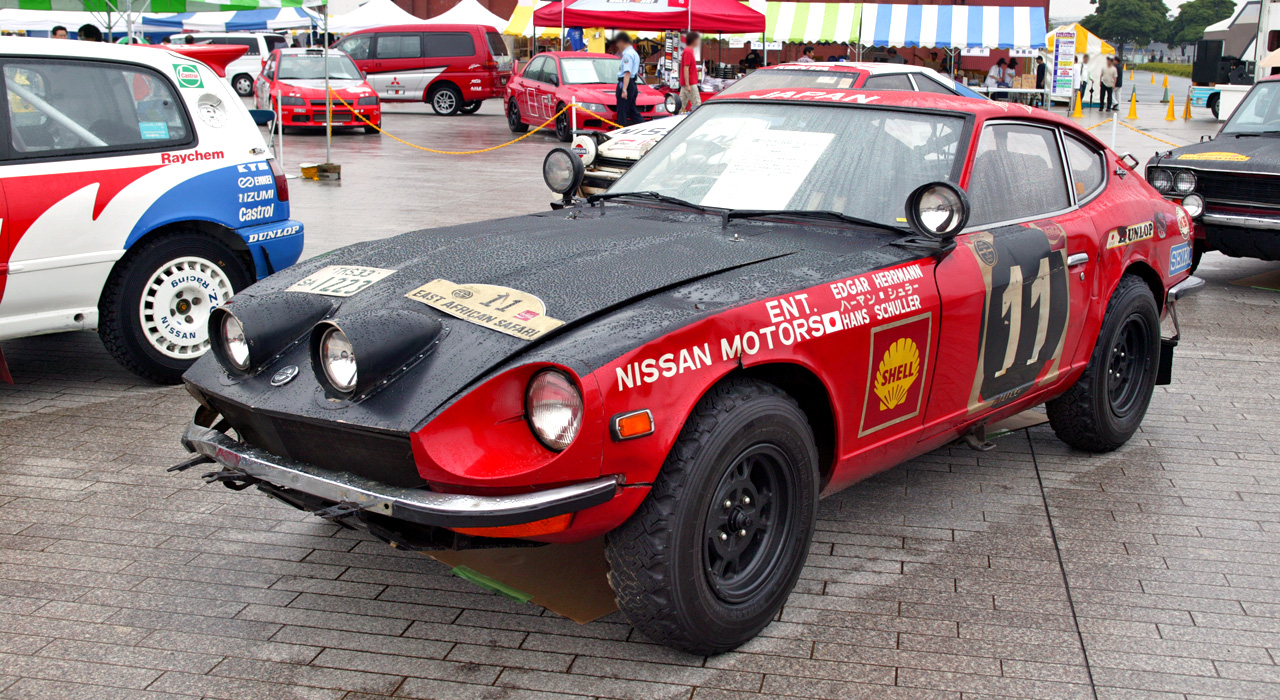
Herrmann's 1971 Safari Rally -winning Datsun 240Z.

Pos	Manufacturer	MON (Monaco)	SWE (Sweden)	ITA (Italy)	KEN (Kenya)	MAR (Morocco)	AUT (Austria)	GRC (Greece)	GBR (United Kingdom)	Pts
1	(France) Alpine-Renault	9	–	9	–	–	9	9	–	36
2	(Sweden) Saab	–	9	–	–	–	–	–	9	18
3	(Germany) Porsche	3.5	3	–	2	2	–	–	6	16.5
4	(Italy) Lancia	1	4	6	–	–	–	4	1	16
5	(Japan) Datsun	2	–	–	9	–	–	–	–	11
5	(Italy) Fiat	–	–	2	–	–	6	3	–	11
7	(France) Peugeot	–	–	–	4	6	–	–	–	10
8	(France) Citroën	–	–	–	–	9	–	–	–	9
8	(Germany) BMW	–	6	–	–	–	2	1	–	9
10	(United Kingdom) Ford	–	–	–	3	–	–	–	3	6
11	(Germany) Volkswagen	–	–	–	–	–	4	–	–	4
11	(Germany) Opel	–	2	–	–	–	–	2	–	4

== 1972 ==
=== Events ===
Round	Event	Dates	Starters	Finishers	Winner	Car	Second	Car	Third	Car
1	(Monaco) Monte Carlo Rally	21–28 January	264	24	(Italy) Sandro Munari	Lancia Fulvia 1.6 Coupé HF	(France) Gérard Larrousse	Porsche 911 S	(Finland) Rauno Aaltonen	Datsun 240Z
2	(Sweden) Swedish Rally	17–20 February	91	56	(Sweden) Stig Blomqvist	Saab 96 V4	(Sweden) Björn Waldegård	Porsche 911 S	(Sweden) Harry Källström	Lancia Fulvia 1.6 Coupé HF
3	(Kenya) Safari Rally	30 March – 3 April	85	18	(Finland) Hannu Mikkola	Ford Escort RS1600	(Poland) Sobiesław Zasada	Porsche 911 S	(Kenya) Vic Preston jr.	Ford Escort RS1600
4	(Morocco) Rallye du Maroc	27–30 April	52	6	(Finland) Simo Lampinen	Lancia Fulvia 1.6 Coupé HF	(France) Bob Neyret	Citroën DS 21 Proto Chassis Court	(Morocco) Raymond Ponnelle	Citroën DS 21
5	(Greece) Acropolis Rally	25–28 May	98	14	(Sweden) Håkan Lindberg	Fiat 124 Sport Spider	(Finland) Simo Lampinen	Lancia Fulvia 1.6 Coupé HF	(Germany) Achim Warmbold	BMW 2002 Ti
6	(Austria) Österreichische Alpenfahrt	6–8 September	58	8	(Sweden) Håkan Lindberg	Fiat 124 Spider	(Austria) Günther Janger	Volkswagen Käfer 1302 S	(Sweden) Per Eklund	Saab 96 V4
7	(Italy) Rallye Sanremo	22–25 October	69	13	(Italy) Amilcare Ballestrieri	Lancia Fulvia 1.6 Coupé HF	(Italy) Sergio Barbasio	Lancia Fulvia 1.6 Coupé HF	(Sweden) Håkan Lindberg	Fiat 124 Spider
8	(United States) Press-on-Regardless Rally	2–4 November	77	21	(United States) Gene Henderson	Jeep Wagoneer	(United States) Tom Jones	Datsun 240Z	(Germany) Erhard Dahm	Jeep Wagoneer
9	(United Kingdom) RAC Rally	2–5 December	192	80	(United Kingdom) Roger Clark	Ford Escort RS1600	(Sweden) Stig Blomqvist	Saab 96 V4	(Sweden) Anders Kulläng	Opel Ascona

=== Final standings ===
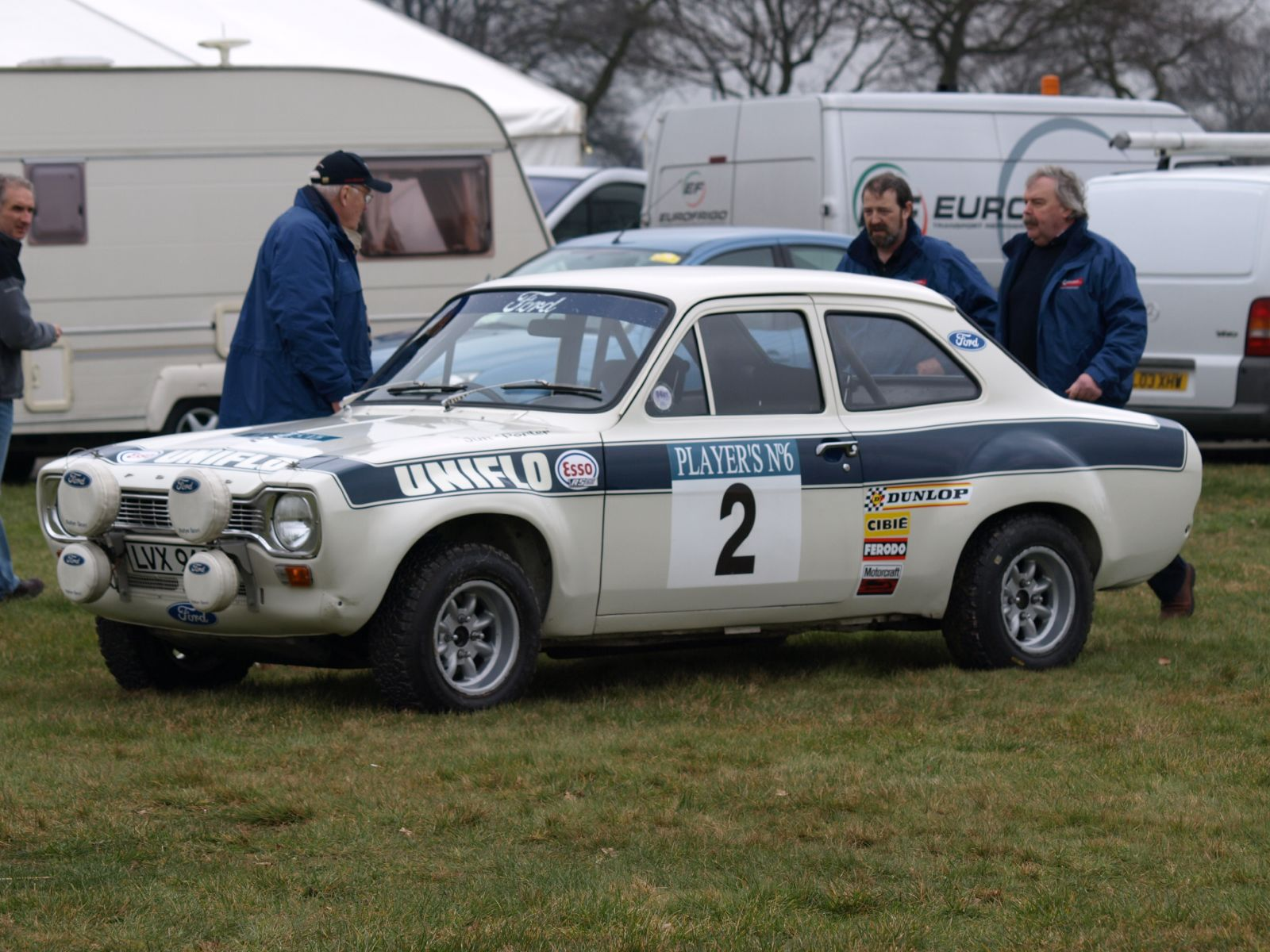
Roger Clark's 1972 RAC Rally -winning Ford Escort RS1600.

Pos	Manufacturer	MON (Monaco)	SWE (Sweden)	KEN (Kenya)	MAR (Morocco)	GRC (Greece)	AUT (Austria)	ITA (Italy)	USA (United States)	GBR (United Kingdom)	Pts
1	(Italy) Lancia	20	12	–	20	15	–	20	–	10	97
2	(Italy) Fiat	3	–	–	–	20	20	12	–	–	55
3	(Germany) Porsche	15	15	15	–	–	8	–	–	–	53
4	(United Kingdom) Ford	8	–	20	–	–	–	–	–	20	48
5	(Sweden) Saab	–	20	–	–	–	12	–	–	15	47
6	(Japan) Datsun	12	–	8	–	6	–	–	15	–	41
7	(Germany) Opel	2	10	–	–	2	6	1	–	12	33
8	(Germany) BMW	–	6	–	–	12	4	–	–	–	22
9	(United States) Jeep	–	–	–	–	–	–	–	20	–	20
10	(France) Citroën	–	–	–	15	–	–	–	–	–	15
10	(Germany) Volkswagen	–	–	–	–	–	15	–	–	–	15
12	(France) Peugeot	–	–	4	8	–	–	–	–	–	12
13	(Sweden) Volvo	–	–	–	–	–	–	–	10	1	11
14	(France) Renault	–	–	–	10	–	–	–	–	–	10
15	(United States) Dodge	–	–	–	–	–	–	–	8	–	8
16	(Japan) Toyota	–	–	–	–	–	–	–	6	2	8
17	(France) Alpine-Renault	4	–	–	–	3	–	–	–	–	7
18	(Italy) Alfa Romeo	–	–	–	–	–	3	–	–	–	3
