= Achim Warmbold =

German rally driver (born 1941)

Personal information
- Nationality: (West Germany) West German
- Born: 17 July 1941 (age 85); Duisburg, Germany

World Rally Championship record
- Years active: 1973–1975, 1978–1986, 2000
- Co-driver: (United Kingdom) John Davenport (France) Jean Todt (West Germany) Hanno Menne (Sweden) Claes Billstam (Sweden) Hans Sylvan (West Germany) Willi-Peter Pitz (France) Philippe Alessandrini (West Germany) Horst Rausch (Italy) Piero Sodano (France) Pierre Alessandrini (West Germany) Bernhard Schmidt (West Germany) Gerhard Kischkel (West Germany) Matthias Feltz (France) "Biche" (Germany) Antony Warmbold
- Teams: BMW, Opel, Alpine-Renault, Toyota, Mazda
- Rallies: 28
- Championships: 0
- Rally wins: 2
- Podiums: 2
- Stage wins: 27
- Total points: 8
- First rally: 1973 Rallye de Portugal
- First win: 1973 Rally of Poland
- Last win: 1973 Österreichische Alpenfahrt
- Last rally: 2000 Rally GB

Achim Warmbold (born 17 July 1941) is a German former rally driver. He won the West German Rally Championship in 1971 and 1980, and scored two outright victories during the inaugural World Rally Championship season in 1973 at the Rally of Poland and Austrian Alpine Rally events.

Aside from his first WRC race, his co-driver throughout the 1973 and 1974 seasons was Jean Todt, who was to enjoy his greatest success as a World Championship-winning team manager in rallying, the 24 Hours of Le Mans and Formula One.

Achim Warmbold was also team manager of Mazda Rallye Team Europe during the Gr. B RX-7 programme. Warmbold also participated some rallies with that car.

== Racing record ==
=== Complete IMC results ===
Year	Entrant	Car	1	2	3	4	5	6	7	8	9
1970	Achim Warmbold	BMW 2002 Ti	MON; 23	SWE	ITA	KEN	AUT	GRE	GBR		
1971	Achim Warmbold	BMW 2002 Ti	MON; Ret	SWE	ITA	KEN	MAR	AUT	GRE	FRA	
1971	BMW Alpina	BMW 2002 Ti									GBR; 14
1972	BMW Alpina	BMW 2002 Ti	MON	SWE	KEN	MAR	GRE; 3	AUT; Ret	ITA	USA	GBR

=== Complete WRC results ===
Year	Entrant	Car	1	2	3	4	5	6	7	8	9	10	11	12	13	14	WDC	Points
1973	Achim Warmbold	Fiat 124 Abarth Rallye							POL; 1	FIN; 8							N/A	N/A
1973	Achim Warmbold	BMW 2002 Tii	MON	SWE	POR; Ret	KEN	MOR	GRE; Ret				ITA; Ret	USA				N/A	N/A
1973	BMW Motorsport GmbH	BMW 2002 Tii									AUT; 1			GBR; 15	FRA		N/A	N/A
1974	Opel Euro Händler Team	Opel Ascona SR	POR; Ret	KEN													N/A	N/A
1974	BMW Motorsport GmbH	BMW 2002 Tii			FIN; 13	ITA	CAN	USA	GBR	FRA							N/A	N/A
1975	Alpine Renault	Alpine-Renault A310 1800	MON; Ret	SWE	KEN												N/A	N/A
1975	Dealer Team Toyota	Toyota Corolla Levin				GRE; Ret	MOR										N/A	N/A
1975	KWS Motorsport	BMW 2002 Tii						POR; Ret	FIN	ITA	FRA	GBR					N/A	N/A
1978	Opel Euro Händler Team	Opel Kadett GT/E	MON; Ret	SWE	KEN	POR; 5	GRE; 5	FIN	CAN	ITA; Ret	CIV	FRA	GBR				N/A	N/A
1979	Achim Warmbold	Citroën CX 2500 Diesel	MON; DSQ	SWE	POR	KEN											NC	0
1979	Achim Warmbold	Porsche 911 Carrera RS					GRE; Ret	NZL	FIN	CAN	ITA	FRA	GBR	CIV			NC	0
1980	Team Fischer HiFi	Toyota Celica 2000 GT	MON; Ret	SWE	POR	KEN	GRC	ARG	FIN	NZL	ITA	FRA	GBR	CIV			NC	0
1981	Achim Warmbold	Toyota Celica 2000 GT	MON	SWE	POR; Ret	KEN	FRA	GRC	ARG	BRA	FIN	ITA	CIV	GBR			NC	0
1982	Mazda Rally Team Europe	Mazda 323	MON; 54	SWE	POR	KEN	FRA	GRC	NZL	BRA	FIN	ITA	CIV	GBR			NC	0
1983	Mazda Rally Team Europe	Mazda 323	MON; 20	SWE	POR	KEN	FRA										NC	0
1983	Mazda Rally Team Europe	Mazda RX-7						GRC; 15	NZL	ARG	FIN	ITA	CIV	GBR			NC	0
1984	Mazda Rally Team Europe	Mazda 323 Turbo	MON; 11	SWE	POR	KEN	FRA										53rd	2
1984	Mazda Rally Team Europe	Mazda RX-7						GRE; 9	NZL	ARG	FIN	ITA	CIV	GBR			53rd	2
1985	Mazda Rally Team Europe	Mazda RX-7	MON	SWE	POR	KEN	FRA	GRC; 6	NZL	ARG	FIN	ITA	CIV	GBR			34th	6
1986	Mazda Rally Team Europe	Mazda 323 4WD	MON; Ret	SWE	POR	KEN	FRA	GRE	NZL	ARG	FIN	CIV	ITA	GBR	USA		NC	0
2000	Achim Warmbold	Toyota Corolla WRC	MON	SWE	KEN	POR	ESP	ARG	GRC	NZL	FIN	CYP	FRA	ITA	AUS	GBR; Ret	NC	0
