= 1973 Rallye Sanremo =

Rallying motorsport event

1973 Rally Sanremo 15th Rally Sanremo
Round 10 of the 1973 World Rally Championship season
← Previous event	Next event →
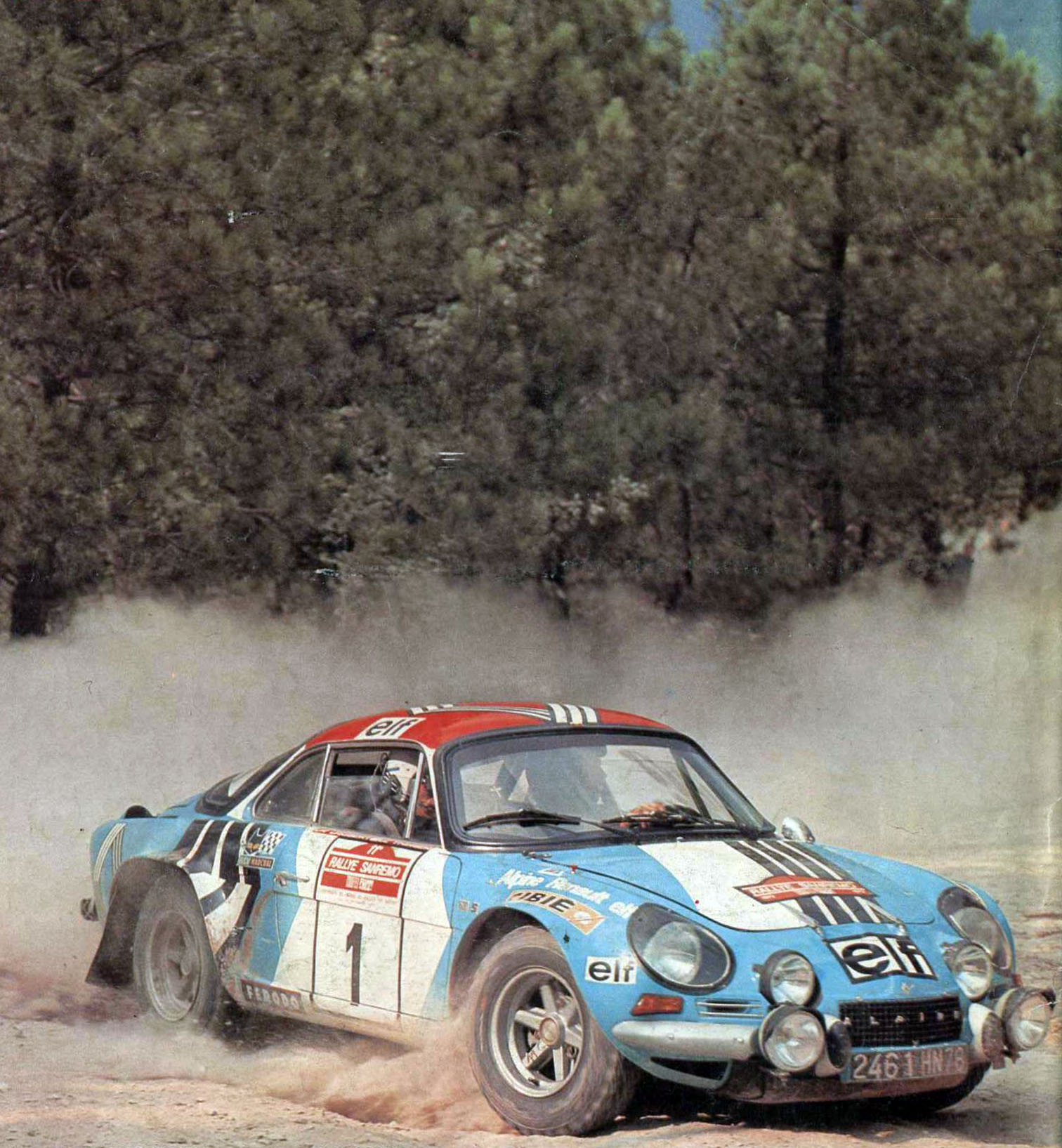
- Jean-Luc Thérier, winner with his Alpine-Renault A110
- Host country: Italy
- Rally base: Sanremo, Italy
- Dates run: 10 October 1973 – 13 October 1973
- Stages: 37 (520 km; 320 miles)
- Stage surface: Asphalt and gravel
- Overall distance: 1,791 km (1,113 miles)

Statistics
- Crews: 107 at start, 36 at finish

Overall results
- Overall winner: (France) Jean-Luc Thérier (France) Jacques Jaubert (France) Alpine Renault; Alpine Renault A110 1800

The 1973 Sanremo Rally (formally the 11th Rally Sanremo) was the tenth round of the inaugural World Rally Championship season. Run in mid-October around Sanremo, Italy, the rally was a mixed surface rally, with some stages on tarmac and others on gravel. Sanremo would become a staple of the WRC calendar for many years until the Italian portion of the WRC was moved to the gravel stages of Sardinia in 2004.

== Report ==
In 1973, and for several years afterward, only manufacturers were given points for finishes in WRC events. Italy marked the official sealing of the manufacturer title for Alpine Renault with their win, despite only needing three points to accomplish the task. Fiat also finished strong on their home event, all but ensuring their place in the final classifications as well. Strong presence in the top ten for both teams minimized the opportunity for other manufacturers to gather points in the event, with only Lancia and Opel picking up some crumbs.

== Results ==
1973 Rally Sanremo results
Finish		Total time	Group	Car #	Driver Co-driver	Car	Mfr. points
Overall	In group	Total time	Group	Car #	Driver Co-driver	Car	Mfr. points
1	1	8 h : 1 m : 32 s	4	1	(France) Jean-Luc Thérier (France) Jacques Jaubert	(France) Alpine Renault A110 1800	20
2	2	8 h : 7 m : 34 s	4	12	(Italy) Maurizio Verini (Italy) Angelo Torriani	(Italy) Fiat Abarth 124 Rally	15
3	3	8 h : 11 m : 37 s	4	8	(France) Jean-Pierre Nicolas (France) Michel Vial	(France) Alpine Renault A110 1800	
4	4	8 h : 13 m : 5 s	4	17	(Italy) Giulio Bisulli (Italy) Arturo Zanuccoli	(Italy) Fiat Abarth 124 Rally	
5	5	8 h : 13 m : 38 s	4	7	(Italy) Sergio Barbasio (Italy) Bruno Scabini	(Italy) Fiat Abarth 124 Rally	
6	6	8 h : 14 m : 31 s	4	9	(Italy) Alcide Paganelli (Italy) Ninni Russo	(Italy) Fiat Abarth 124 Rally	
7	7	8 h : 15 m : 0 s	4	14	(Italy) Mauro Pregliasco (Italy) Angelo Garzoglio	(Italy) Lancia Fulvia 1.6 Coupé HF	4
8	8	8 h : 15 m : 33 s	4	11	(Finland) Simo Lampinen (Italy) Piero Sodano	(Italy) Lancia Fulvia 1.6 Coupé HF	
9	1	9 h : 18 m : 17 s	2	43	(Italy) Roberto Bauce (Italy) Andrea Visconti	(Germany) Opel Ascona	2
10	1	9 h : 21 m : 1 s	3	29	(Italy) Bruno Ferraris (Italy) Giorgio Vigo	(Italy) Lancia Fulvia 1.6 Coupé HF	
11	2	9 h : 22 m : 30 s	2	47	(Italy) 'Illicher' (Italy) Claudio Bocca	(Germany) Opel Ascona	
12	1	9 h : 25 m : 24 s	1	84	(France) Christian Dorche (Monaco) Jean Pallanca	(Germany) Opel Ascona	
13	2	9 h : 33 m : 41 s	1	82	(France) Alain Errani (France) Pierre Thimonier	(Germany) Opel Ascona	
14	2	9 h : 38 m : 1 s	3	67	(Italy) 'Del Prete' (Italy) 'Gigli'	(Italy) Lancia Fulvia 1.6 Coupé HF	
15	3	9 h : 42 m : 58 s	2	56	(Italy) Sergio Gamenara (Italy) 'Pisciotta'	(France) Renault 12 Gordini	
16	4	9 h : 43 m : 44 s	2	44	(Italy) Benelli (Italy) Mazzoni	(Germany) Opel Ascona	
17	3	9 h : 45 m : 14 s	1		(Italy) Stefi (Italy) Rivani	(Germany) Opel Ascona	
18	3	9 h : 50 m : 43 s	3	65	(Italy) Pons (Italy) Vinotto	(Italy) Lancia Fulvia 1.6 Coupé HF	
19	5	9 h : 50 m : 48 s	2	45	(France) Raymond Chianéa (France) Jean Chianéa	(Germany) Opel Ascona	
20	6	9 h : 54 m : 7 s	2	50	(Italy) Tardivo (Italy) Del Sacco	(Italy) Fiat 125S	
25		10 h : 24 m : 32 s	1	30	(France) Jean-Louis Barailler (France) Philippe Fayel	(Germany) Opel Ascona SR	
Retired (mechanical)			4	2	(Italy) Amilcare Ballestrieri (Italy) Silvio Maiga	(Italy) Lancia Fulvia 1.6 Coupé HF	
Retired (accident)			2	3	(Germany) Achim Warmbold (France) Jean Todt	(Germany) BMW 2002	
Retired (mechanical)			4	4	(Italy) Raffaele Pinto (Italy) Arnaldo Bernacchini	(Italy) Fiat Abarth 124 Rally	
Retired (accident)			4	5	(France) Bernard Darniche (France) Alain Mahé	(France) Alpine Renault A110 1800	
Retired (mechanical)			2	10	(Sweden) Björn Waldegård (Sweden) Hans Thorszelius	(Germany) BMW 2002	
Retired (mechanical)			4	19	(Italy) Fulvio Bacchelli (Italy) Francesco Rossetti	(Italy) Fiat Abarth 124 Rally	
Retired (mechanical)			2	26	(Italy) Roberto Cambiaghi (Italy) Rudy	(Germany) Opel Ascona	
Retired (mechanical)			2	32	(France) Jean-Louis Clarr (France) Robert Lockwood	(Germany) Opel Ascona	
Retired (mechanical)				76	(Italy) Sorrentino (Italy) Pino Scigliano	(Italy) Fiat 128 Coupé	
Retired (mechanical)			2	32	(France) Jean Louis Clarr (France) Robert Lokwood	(Germany) Opel Ascona	

Source: Independent WRC archive

== Championship standings after the event ==
1973 World Rally Championship for Manufacturers points standings after round 10
After round 10		Team	Season end	
Position	Points	Team	Position	Points
1	127	(France) Alpine Renault	1	147
2	84	(Italy) Fiat	2	84
3	42	(Sweden) Saab	5	42
4	36	(United States) Ford	3	76
5	33	(France) Citroën	7	33
6	24	(Germany) BMW	8	28
7	24	(Germany) Porsche	9	27
8	22	(Japan) Datsun	6	34
9	19	(Sweden) Volvo	4	44
10	17	(Italy) Lancia	13	17
11	15	(East Germany) Wartburg	14	15
12	15	(Germany) Opel	11	25
13	14	(Germany) Volkswagen	15	15
14	13	(France) Peugeot	16	13
15	12	(Poland) Polski Fiat	12	18
16	5	(Japan) Toyota	10	25
17	4	(Japan) Mitsubishi	17	4
18	3	(Czechoslovakia) Škoda	18	3
19	1	(Germany) Audi	20	2
