= 1978 Tour de Corse =

1978 Tour de Corse 22º Tour de Corse - Rallye de France
Round 10 of the 1978 World Rally Championship season
← Previous event	Next event →
- Host country: France
- Rally base: Ajaccio, Corsica, France
- Dates run: 4 – 5 November 1978
- Stages: 10 (543.10 km; 337.47 miles)
- Stage surface: Tarmac
- Transport distance: 616.9 km (383.3 miles)
- Overall distance: 1,160 km (720 miles)

Statistics
- Crews: 116 at start, 37 at finish

Overall results
- Overall winner: (France) Bernard Darniche (France) Alain Mahé (Italy) Fiat-Alitalia; Fiat 131 Abarth; 6:47:34

The 1978 Tour de Corse (also known as the 22º Tour de Corse - Rallye de France) was the 10th round of the sixth World Rally Championship season, and the 18th event in the second FIA Cup for Rally Drivers. It took place on November 4 and 5 in the County of Corsica in France, and the rally was run primarily on the road. Bernard Darniche repeated his 1977 win with co-driver Alain Mahé, again driving a Fiat 131 Abarth - as did second-place finisher Jean-Claude Andruet and third-placed Sandro Munari.

== Report ==
In 1978, the Tour de Corse in Corsica was the penultimate race of the World Rally Championship. The race was held across ten stages, with Jean-Claude Andruet winning four of them. Andruet led the rally until the ninth stage. As usual, most of the top finishers (9 out of the top 10) were from France. Triumph had mounted a significant effort this year, with two TR7 V8s driven by Tony Pond and Jean-Luc Thérier, but both had to retire before the first two special stages were over after the transmission oil plugs fell out of both the cars.

Aside from four Fiat 131 Abarth in the top five, three Porsche 911, two Opel Kadett GT/E, and one Alpine A110 finished in the points.

== Results ==
1978 Tour de Corse results
Finish		Total time	Group	Car #	Driver Co-driver	Car	Mfr.points
Overall	In group	Total time	Group	Car #	Driver Co-driver	Car	Mfr.points
1	1	6 h : 47 m : 34 s	4	1	(France) Bernard Darniche (France) Alain Mahé	(Italy) Fiat 131 Abarth	18
2	2	6 h : 51 m : 59 s	4	3	(France) Jean-Claude Andruet (France) "Biche"	(Italy) Fiat 131 Abarth	
3	3	6 h : 52 m : 59 s	4	5	(Italy) Sandro Munari (Italy) Mario Mannucci	(Italy) Fiat 131 Abarth	
4	4	6 h : 57 m : 44 s	4	9	(France) Jacques Alméras (France) Jean-Claude Perramond	(Germany) Porsche 911	12
5	5	6 h : 58 m : 12 s	4	10	(France) Michèle Mouton (France) Françoise Conconi	(Italy) Fiat 131 Abarth	
6	1	7 h : 05 m : 11 s	3	29	(France) Pierre-Louis Moreau (France) Patrice Baron	(Germany) Porsche 911	
7	1	7 h : 06 m : 09 s	2	6	(France) Jean-Pierre Nicolas (France) Vincent Laverne	(Germany) Opel Kadett GT/E	12
8	2	7 h : 17 m : 55 s	3	27	(France) Daniel Rognoni (France) Gilbert Dini	(Germany) Porsche 911 Carrera RS 2.7	
9	6	7 h : 19 m : 19 s	4	21	(France) Claude Balesi (France) Jean-Paul Cirindini	(France) Alpine-Renault A110 1800	5
10	1	7 h : 31 m : 03 s	1	89	(France) Christian Dorche (France) Jean-François Fauchille	(Germany) Opel Kadett GT/E	
11	2	7 h : 32 m : 11 s	1	91	(France) Bernard Picone (France) Robert Cianelli	(Germany) Opel Kadett GT/E	
12	3	7 h : 32 m : 13 s	3	24	(France) Robert Simonetti (France) Jean-Michel Simonetti	(France) Alpine-Renault A110 1800	
13	2	7 h : 36 m : 10 s	2	41	(Belgium) Jean-Marie Jacquemin (France) Dorothée Jacquemin-Lebeau	(United Kingdom) Chrysler Sunbeam	
14	3	7 h : 39 m : 58 s	2	77	(France) Daniel Canarelli (France) Gilbert Giraud	(Germany) Opel Kadett GT/E	
15	7	7 h : 44 m : 53 s	4	19	(France) Jean-Marie Soriano (France) G. Morelli	(France) Alpine-Renault A110 1600	
16	4	7 h : 54 m : 47 s	2	38	(Italy) Auguste Turiani (Tchine) (France) Denise Emanuelli	(Germany) Opel Kadett GT/E	
17	5	8 h : 02 m : 35 s	2	49	(France) Alain Coppier (France) Robert Jocteur-Monrozier	(France) Peugeot 104 ZS	
18	3	8 h : 05 m : 08 s	1	107	(France) Ange-Paul Franceschi (France) Daniel Chiesa	(Germany) Opel Kadett GT/E	
19	4	8 h : 08 m : 47 s	1	97	(France) Martine Cordesse (France) Nicole Garçon	(Germany) Opel Kadett GT/E	
20	6	8 h : 15 m : 58 s	2	61	(France) Gilbert Casanova (France) Jean-Yves Arrii	(France) Simca Rallye 2	
21	7	8 h : 23 m : 17 s	2	47	(France) Georges Fantino (France) Auguste Giuge	(Germany) Opel Kadett GT/E	
22	5	8 h : 28 m : 53 s	1	94	(France) Vincent Sanna (France) Gilbert Luigi	(Germany) Opel Kadett GT/E	
23	6	8 h : 31 m : 45 s	1	101	(France) Richard Thomas (rally driver) (France) Jean-Claude Bonnard	(Germany) Opel Kadett GT/E	
24	7	8 h : 33 m : 03 s	1	114	(France) François Baldacci (France) Joseph Cristiani	(Germany) Opel Kadett GT/E	
25	8	8 h : 34 m : 10 s	1	117	(France) Jean-Pierre Deriu (France) "Chasty"	(France) Simca Rallye 3	
26	9	8 h : 35 m : 05 s	1	111	(France) F. Bartoli (France) J-L. Colonna	(Germany) Opel Kadett GT/E	
27	4	8 h : 35 m : 08 s	3	35	(France) Pierre Gusciani (France) R. Pradier	(France) Alpine-Renault A110 1600	
28	10	8 h : 38 m : 48 s	1	103	(France) Mathieu Martinetti (France) Frédéric Coubard	(Italy) Autobianchi A112 Abarth	
29	8	8 h : 45 m : 57 s	2	44	(France) Jean-Charles Silvani (France) Tanaka(Driver)	(France) Renault 5 Alpine	
30	9	8 h : 46 m : 36 s	2	70	(France) Guillaume Sanson (France) Jean-Pierre Demaille	(France) Peugeot 504	
31	11	8 h : 49 m : 55 s	1	105	(France) X. Bartoli (France) Mme. L. Bartoli	(Germany) Opel Kadett GT/E	
32	12	8 h : 57 m : 27 s	1	106	(France) Jean-Baptiste Bastelica (France) Pierre Colombiani	(Germany) Volkswagen Golf GTi	
33	5	8 h : 59 m : 29 s	3	34	(France) Izé De Castelli (France) J-C. Guilbert-Moine	(Germany) Porsche 911 SC	
34	10	9 h : 14 m : 10 s	2	71	(France) Jean-Charles Bassoul (France) François Bassoul	(France) Renault 5 Alpine	
35	13	9 h : 18 m : 24 s	1	121	(France) B. Pasqualini (France) P. Massiani	(France) Peugeot 104	
36	11	9 h : 20 m : 02 s	2	57	(Italy) M. Bussotti (Benny) (Italy) M. d'Apolo	(Germany) Opel Kadett GT/E	
37	12	9 h : 34 m : 34 s	2	84	(France) L. Tomasi (France) M. Giudicelli	(France) Simca Rallye 2	
SS1	Retired (clutch)		4	2	(United Kingdom) Tony Pond (United Kingdom) Fred Gallagher	(United Kingdom) Triumph TR7 V8	
SS5	Retired (differential)		4	4	(France) Jean-Pierre Manzagol (France) Jean-François Philippi	(France) Alpine-Renault A110 1800	
SS2	Retired (gearbox)		4	7	(France) Jean-Luc Thérier (France) Michel Vial	(United Kingdom) Triumph TR7 V8	
SS1	Retired (engine)		4	8	(Italy) Francis Serpaggi (France) Dominique Subrini	(Italy) Lancia Stratos HF	
SS2	Retired (accident)		4	11	(Italy) Adartico Vudafieri (Italy) Bruno Scabini	(Italy) Lancia Stratos HF	
SS3	Retired (electrical)		4	12	(France) Vincent Francis (France) Willy Huret	(Germany) Porsche 911 Carrera RS 3.0	
SS3	Retired (punctures)		4	14	(Italy) Attilio Bettega (Italy) Gianni Vacchetto	(Italy) Lancia Stratos HF	
SS3	Retired		4	15	(France) Verdura; Farre	(France) Alpine-Renault A110 1600	
	Retired		4	16	(France) Sébastien Vannucci (France) François "FanFan" Vannucci	(France) Alpine-Renault A110	
	Retired		4	17	(France) Murati (France) Jacques Filippi	(France) Alpine-Renault A110	
	Retired		4	18	(France) Ange-Marie Venturini (France) Dominique Simonini	(France) Alpine-Renault A110	
	Retired		4	20	(France) Marc Wilmot (France) Uwe Fraas	(France) Alpine-Renault A110	
SS5	Retired (Accident)		3	22	(France) Gérard Swaton (France) Bernard Cordesse	(Germany) Porsche 911 Carrera RS 2.7	
	Retired		3	23	(France) "Sartou" (France) Maurice Gélin	(Germany) Porsche 911	
	Retired		3	25	(Italy) Giancarlo Ontano (Italy) Giuseppe Fiorucci	(Germany) Porsche 911	
	Retired		3	26	(France) Michel Branca (France) Camoin	(France) Alpine-Renault A310	
SS6	Retired (accident)		3	28	(France) Christian Gardavot (France) Georges Otto	(Germany) Porsche 911	
	Retired		3	31	(France) "Rocal" (France) A. Paolucci	(Germany) Porsche 911	
	Retired		3	32	(France) Francis Leymarie (France) Patrick Vieux-Rochat	(France) Alpine-Renault A110	
	Retired		3	33	(Monaco) Jean Taibi (France) Pierre Innocenti	(France) Alpine-Renault A110 1600S	
	Retired		3	36	(France) "Noquin" (France) Gérard Roncin	(Germany) Porsche 911	
SS4	Retired (brakes)		1	37	(France) Jean-Louis Clarr (Monaco) "Tilber"	(Germany) Opel Kadett GT/E	
SS3	Retired (electrics)		2	39	(France) Yves Loubet (France) Jean-Louis Mérigot	(Germany) Opel Kadett GT/E	
SS3	Retired (suspension)		2	42	(France) Jean-Sébastien Couloumiès (France) Jean-Bernard Vieu	(Germany) Opel Kadett GT/E	
	Retired		2	43	(France) Charles Alberti (France) René Alemany ("Toutàfond")	(Germany) Opel Kadett GT/E	
SS2	Retired (oil pipe)		2	45	(France) Christine Dacremont (France) Isabelle Perrier	(Italy) Fiat 127 Sport	
	Retired		2	46	(France) Jean Bondrille (France) Vincent Fattaccio	(Germany) Opel Kadett GT/E	
SS2	Retired (oil)		2	48	(Italy) Antonella Mandelli (Italy) Cristina Bertone	(Italy) Fiat 127 Sport	
	Retired		2	50	(France) Agostini (France) Cipriani	(United Kingdom) Triumph Dolomite Sprint	
SS5	Retired (distributor)		2	51	(France) Mariane Fourton (France) Marie-Madeleine Fouquet	(Italy) Fiat 127 Sport	
	Retired		2	52	(France) "La Guepe" (France) Christiane Dutto	(France) Simca Rallye 2	
	Retired		2	53	(France) Albert Braida (France) Alain Boniface	(Germany) Volkswagen Golf GTi	
	Retired		2	54	(France) Jean-Jacques Audouard (France) Rochebrun	(Germany) Opel Kadett GT/E	
SS3	Retired (distributor)		2	55	(Italy) Anna Cambiaghi (Italy) Enrica Marenghi	(Italy) Fiat 127 Sport	
	Retired		2	56	(France) "Olgui" (France) Christian Ledent	(Germany) Opel Kadett GT/E	
	Retired		2	58	(France) Luc Desangles (France) Paul-Marie Feretti	(Germany) Opel Kadett GT/E	
SS6	Retired (distributor)		2	59	(France) Joëlle Chardin-Hazard (France) Antoinette Straumann	(Italy) Fiat 127 Sport	
	Retired		2	60	(France) F-J. Galgani (France) R. Dominici	(Japan) Toyota	
	Retired		2	62	(France) Jean-Yves Navucet (France) Dominique Le Corre	(Germany) Opel Kadett GT/E	
SS10	Retired (electrical)		2	63	(Italy) Maurizia Baresi (Italy) Iva Boggio	(Italy) Fiat 127 Sport	
	Retired		2	64	(Italy) Massimo Belfiglio (Italy) Mauro Fulchieri	(Italy) Autobianchi A112 Abarth	
	Retired		2	65	(France) Touquet (France) Touquet	(Japan) Toyota	
	Retired		2	66	(France) Simongiovanni (France) Muffragi	(France) Simca Rallye 2	
	Retired		2	68	(France) Jean-André Antonetti; J. Fabiani	(Germany) Opel Kadett GT/E	
	Retired		2	69	(France) J. Milanini (France) D. Agostini	(Germany) Opel Ascona	
	Retired		2	72	(France) Jacques de Peretti (France) César de Peretti	(Germany) Opel Kadett GT/E	
	Retired		2	73	(France) Jean Lasfargeas (France) Emile	(Germany) Opel Kadett GT/E	
	Retired		2	74	(France) Patrick Bernardini (France) Alain Marketou	(France) Simca Rallye 2	
	Retired		2	76	(France) Bernard Matteudi (France) Philippe Denkin	(Germany) Opel Kadett GT/E	
	Retired		2	78	(France) André Colonna (France) Jean Campana	(France) Renault 5 Alpine	
	Retired		2	79	(France) Jean-Pierre Carducci (France) Cerezuela	(France) Simca Rallye 2	
	Retired		2	80	(France) Jacques Filippi (France) Charles Luciani	(France) Simca Rallye 2	
	Retired		2	81	(France) Jean-Charles Martinetti (France) Philippe Gabrielli	(France) Simca Rallye 2	
	Retired		2	82	Baranovsky; Attil	(France) Peugeot 104	
	Retired		2	83	(France) François Andreucci (France) Panutti	(France) Simca Rallye 2	
	Retired		2	85	Meme; Mariani	(France) Peugeot 104	
	Retired		1	86	(France) Claude Laurent (France) Jacques Marché	(France) Peugeot 104 ZS	
	Retired		1	87	(France) Dominique De Meyer (France) Baudon	(Germany) Opel Kadett GT/E	
	Retired		1	90	(France) Jean-Pierre Mari ("Smack") (France) Jean-Pierre Giacomoni	(Japan) Toyota Celica Liftback	
SS5	Retired (mechanical)		1	92	(France) Marc Praschl (France) Christian Petit	(United Kingdom) Ford Escort RS2000 Mk II	
	Retired		1	93	(France) Xavier Carlotti (France) Jean-Luc Pegoix	(France) Peugeot 104 ZS	
	Retired		1	95	(Lebanon) "Bagheera" (France) "Titus"	(Germany) Opel Kadett GT/E	
	Retired (accident)		1	96	(France) Jean-Pierre Leude (France) François Souquet	(Germany) Opel Kadett GT/E	
	Retired		1	98	(France) José Murati (France) de Susini	(Germany) Opel Kadett GT/E	
	Retired		1	99	(France) Jean-Félix Farrucci (France) Albert Gori	(Germany) Opel Kadett GT/E	
	Retired		1	100	(France) J-P. Istria (France) Patrick de la Foata	(Germany) Opel Kadett GT/E	
	Retired		1	102	(France) Gugliemi (France) Seigneurie	(Germany) Opel Kadett GT/E	
	Retired		1	104	(France) Charles Marcelli ("Toupi") (France) Jean Filippini ("Rolac")	(Germany) Volkswagen Golf GTi	
	Retired		1	108	(France) Italo Arena; Davinen	(Japan) Toyota	
	Retired		1	109	(France) Alex De Lanfranchi (France) Quilici	(Germany) Volkswagen Golf GTi	
	Retired		1	110	(France) Grazzini (France) Caraffa	(Germany) Opel Ascona	
	Retired		1	112	(France) Félicien Balesi (France) Balesi	(Germany) Volkswagen Golf GTi	
	Retired		1	113	(France) Chiappe (France) Antonini	(Germany) Volkswagen Golf GTi	
	Retired		1	115	(France) Jean Porri; Mijane	(Germany) Opel Kadett GT/E	
	Retired		1	116	Rinaldi (France) Albertini	(France) Simca Rallye 2	
	Retired		1	118	Membre; Merlang	(Netherlands) DAF	
	Retired		1	119	(France) Colombani; Cameron	(France) Peugeot 104	
	Retired		1	120	(France) André Paoletti (France) Paoletti	(France) Simca Rallye 2	
	Retired		1	122	(France) Godart (France) Breton	(Germany) Volkswagen Golf GTi	

== Championship standings ==
1978 World Rally Championship for Manufacturers: points standings after round 10
After round 10		Team	Season end	
Position	Points	Team	Position	Points
1	134	(Italy) Fiat	1	134
2	86	(Germany) Opel	3	100
3	82	(United Kingdom) Ford	2	100
4	79	(Germany) Porsche	4	79
5	50	(Japan) Toyota	6	50
6	49	(Italy) Lancia	7	49
7	45	(France) Peugeot	8	45
8	42	(Japan) Datsun	5	52
9	33	(France) Renault	9	33
10	18	(Sweden) Saab	11	18
11	17	(Germany) Volkswagen	12	17
12	16	(Japan) Mitsubishi	13	16
13	14	(United Kingdom) Vauxhall	14	14
13	14	(Italy) Alfa Romeo	14	14
15	12	(United Kingdom) British Leyland Cars	10	24
15	12	(Germany) Mercedes	16	12
17	10	(Sweden) Volvo	17	10
18	6	(Czechoslovakia) Škoda	19	6
19	5	(France) Alpine-Renault	20	5
20	4	(Soviet Union) Lada	21	4
