= 1973 Polish Rally =

Rallying motorsport event

1973 Polish Rally 33rd Polish Rally
Round 7 of the 1973 World Rally Championship season
← Previous event	Next event →
- Host country: Poland
- Rally base: Kraków, Poland
- Dates run: 12 July 1973 – 15 July 1973
- Stages: 55 (734 km; 456 miles)
- Stage surface: Asphalt and gravel
- Overall distance: 3,912 km (2,431 miles)

Statistics
- Crews: 62 at start, 3 at finish

Overall results
- Overall winner: (West Germany) Achim Warmbold (France) Jean Todt (Italy) Fiat; Fiat Abarth 124 Rallye

The 1973 Polish Rally, formally known as the 33rd Polish Rally, was the seventh round of the inaugural World Rally Championship season. Held in mid-July in southern Poland, this event marked the only year in which Poland, or any member of the Warsaw Pact, was included in the WRC calendar until 2009, 36 years later. This edition is also notable for the fact that out of the 62 teams that started the rally, only three completed it, a record that still stands today.

== Report ==
In 1973, and for several subsequent years, points were only awarded to manufacturers for their finishes in WRC events. Despite the misfortune experienced by most teams, Fiat secured its first win for the Fiat Abarth 124 Rallye. Since no other major competitors finished the rally, Fiat's win was by a significant margin, with the German driver outpacing the next finisher by nearly three hours.

== Results ==
1973 Polish Rally results
Finish		Total time	Group	Car #	Driver Co-driver	Car	Mfr. points
Overall	In group	Total time	Group	Car #	Driver Co-driver	Car	Mfr. points
1	1	8 h : 28 m : 14 s	4	4	(West Germany) Achim Warmbold (France) Jean Todt	(Italy) Fiat Abarth 124 Rallye	20
2	1	11 h : 15 m : 16 s	2	91	(East Germany) Egon Culmbacher (East Germany) Werner Ernst	(East Germany) Wartburg 353	15
3	1	12 h : 8 m : 31 s	1	55	(Poland) Maciej Stawowiak (Poland) Jan Czyżyk	(Poland) Polski Fiat 125p	12
Retired (Excluded)			4	2	(France) Jean-Luc Thérier (France) Alain Mahé	(France) Alpine Renault A110 1800	
Retired (Oil Pressure)			4	3	(Italy) Alcide Paganelli (Italy) Ninni Russo	(Italy) Fiat Abarth 124 Rallye	
Retired (Accident)			4	7	(Poland) Adam Smorawiński (Poland) Zbigniew Kołaczkowski	(Germany) Porsche 911	
Retired (Time limit exceeded)			2	12	(Sweden) Hans Britth (Sweden) Magnus Olsson	(United Kingdom) Ford Capri 2600	
Retired			2	18	(Poland) Janusz Wojtyna (Poland) Romana Wojtyna	(Germany) BMW 2002 Ti	
Retired			2	20	(Poland) Henryk Kaczmarczyk (Poland) Miecyzsław Banaś	(Poland) Polski Fiat 125p	
Retired (Water pump)			2	21	(Poland) Marian Bień (Poland) Wiesław Nicieja	(Poland) Polski Fiat 125p	
Retired			2	22	(Germany) Ewald Pauli (Poland) Jacek Jurczak	(Germany) Volkswagen Käfer 1302 S	
Retired (Time limit exceeded)			2	23	(Poland) Jerzy Dobrzański (Poland) Antoni Ryniak	(Poland) Polski Fiat 125p	
Retired (Accident)			2	24	(Soviet Union) Stasys Brundza (Soviet Union) Anatoli Brum	(Soviet Union) Moskvich 412	
Retired			2	25	(Poland) Andrzej Turczyński (Poland) Leon Grzybek	(Poland) Polski Fiat 125p	
Retired (Tailgate joint)			2	26	(Poland) Ryszard Żyszkowski (Poland) Jerzy Żyszkowski	(Poland) Polski Fiat 125p	
Retired			2	27	(Germany) Horst Rausch (Poland) Jerzy Sypniewski	(Germany) BMW 2002	
Retired			2	28	(Hungary) András Tar (Hungary) Ferenc Simon	(Poland) Polski Fiat 125p	
Retired			2	30	(Germany) Dieter Rosenfeldt (Germany) Hans Herff	(France) Renault 12 Gordini	
Retired			2	31	(Soviet Union) Kastytis Girdauskas (Soviet Union) Arvydas Girdauskas	(Soviet Union) Moskvich 412	
Retired (Rear differential)			2	34	(Poland) Krzysztof Komornicki (Poland) Błażej Krupa	(Poland) Polski Fiat 125p	
Retired			2	35	(Poland) Jerzy Landsberg (Poland) Marian Wangrat	(Poland) Polski Fiat 125p	
Retired (time)			2	36	(Soviet Union) Lev Morozov (Soviet Union) Andris Kalnais	(Soviet Union) Moskvich 412	
Retired			2	37	(Denmark) Poul Weinreich (Denmark) Holger Møllen-Nielsen	(Germany) Opel Ascona 1.6 SR	
Retired			1	42	(Denmark) Oluf Vester Kristensen (Denmark) Holm-Per Sandager	(Sweden) Volvo 142 GL	
Retired			2	43	(Poland) Jan Dziedzic (Poland) Wiesław Pieprzak	(Poland) Polski Fiat 125p	
Retired			1	44	(Denmark) Carl Marius Syberg (Denmark) Per Brøns	(Germany) Opel Ascona	
Retired			1	45	(Germany) Klaus Miersch (Germany) Winfried Matter	(Germany) Opel Ascona 1.9 SR	
Retired			1	46	(Germany) Christian Köthe (Germany) Inga Köthe	(Italy) Alfa Romeo 2000 GTV	
Retired			1	47	(Germany) Jens Schmidt (Germany) Adolf Holm	(Germany) BMW 2002 Ti	
Retired (Accident)			1	49	(Soviet Union) Heino Sepp (Soviet Union) Toomas Bernstein	(Soviet Union) Moskvich 412	
Retired			1	50	(France) Jacques Régis (France) Chantal Argeliès	(Germany) Opel Ascona	
Retired (Misdirection)			1	51	(Poland) Włodzimierz Markowski (Poland) Andrzej Radecki	(Poland) Polski Fiat 125p	
Retired			1	52	(Poland) Edmund Oprocha (Poland) Andrzej Orłowski	(Poland) Polski Fiat 125p	
Retired			1	53	(Bulgaria) Detelin Tomov (Bulgaria) Peitcho Peitchev	(Soviet Union) Lada VAZ 2103	
Retired			1	54	(Denmark) Jens Erik Esbensen (Denmark) Villy Ebbesen	(Japan) Datsun 1600 SSS	
Retired (Time limit exceeded)			1	57	(Sweden) Evert Wesström (Sweden) Bo Carlsson	(Japan) Toyota Corolla	
Retired			2	61	(Poland) Andrzej Gergovich (Poland) Robert Jenner	(Spain) SEAT 850 D	
Retired			2	62	(Bulgaria) Nikolai Vringov (Bulgaria) Lambo Mitzev	(Soviet Union) Lada VAZ 2101	
Retired (Suspension)			1	63	(Poland) Marek Varisella (Poland) Janina Jedynak	(Poland) Polski Fiat 125p	
Retired			2	64	(Germany) Horst Hohlheimer (Germany) Rudolf Huber	(Italy) Fiat 128 Sport Coupé	
Retired			2	65	(Poland) Aleksander Adamski (Poland) Andrzej Brzeziński	(Czech Republic) Škoda 100 L	
Retired			2	66	(Bulgaria) Nikolai Kamburov (Bulgaria) Kamen Kokinov	(France) Renault 8	
Retired			2	67	(Hungary) Pál Gaál (Hungary) Ferenc Iriczfalvi	(Czech Republic) Škoda 100	
Retired			2	68	(Hungary) Mihály Balatoni (Hungary) István Sándor	(Czech Republic) Škoda 100	
Retired			2	69	(East Germany) Karlfried Weigert (East Germany) Bernhard Malsch	(East Germany) Wartburg 353	
Retired (Breakdown)			2	70	(East Germany) Peter Hommel (East Germany) Günter Bork	(East Germany) Wartburg 353	
Retired (Accident)			2	71	(Poland) Stanisław Fiedor (Poland) Jacek Chmielewski	(East Germany) Trabant P601	
Retired			2	72	(East Germany) Jürgen Sparwald (East Germany) Carl-Ulrich Karsten	(East Germany) Wartburg 353	
Retired			2	73	(Poland) Marek Oryński (Poland) Kazimierz Bocheński	(Poland) FSO Syrena 104	
Retired			2	74	(Poland) Zbigniew Baran (Poland) Julian Kuzaj	(Poland) FSO Syrena 104	
Retired			2	75	(Sweden) Claes Anderson (Sweden) Peter Peterson	(United Kingdom) Ford Escort Twin Cam	
Retired			2	76	(Romania) Vasile Olaru (Romania) Ilie Olteanu	(Romania) Dacia 1300	
Retired			2	77	(Romania) Petre Vezeanu (Romania) Mircea Ilioale	(Romania) Dacia 1300	
Retired			2	78	(Poland) Adam Masłowiec (Poland) Konrad Rutkowski	(Poland) FSM Syrena 105	
Retired			1	80	(East Germany) Volker Beyer (East Germany) Werner Schramm	(East Germany) Wartburg 353	
Retired			1	81	(Bulgaria) Radoslav Petkov (Bulgaria) Kostadin Gurlev	(Soviet Union) Lada VAZ 2101	
Retired			1	82	(Romania) Adrian Margarint (Romania) Nicolas Aslan	(Romania) Dacia 1300	
Retired			1	83	(Bulgaria) Ilija Bonev (Bulgaria) Zlati Zlatev	(Soviet Union) Lada VAZ 2101	
Retired			1	84	(Hungary) György Szenttornyay (Hungary) László Szzenttornyay	(Soviet Union) Lada VAZ 2101	
Retired			1	85	(Romania) Iosif Santa (Romania) Pavel Chiorcea	(Romania) Dacia 1300	
Retired			1	86	(Hungary) Béla Augustin (Hungary) Elek Farkas	(Romania) Dacia 1300	
Retired			1	87	(Poland) Jerzy Strasz (Poland) Halina Strasz	(Poland) Polski Fiat 125p	
Retired			1	89	(East Germany) Horst Niebergall (East Germany) Harald Würfel	(East Germany) Wartburg 353	
Retired			1	90	(Poland) Andrzej Włoch (Poland) Marec Roczniak	(Poland) Polski Fiat 125p	
Retired			1	92	(Germany) Tilo Wünsch (Germany) Henning Wünsch	(Italy) Fiat 128 Coupé	

Source: Independent WRC archive, eWRC Results

== Championship standings after the event ==
1973 World Rally Championship for Manufacturers points standings after round 7
After round 6		Team	Season end	
Position	Points	Team	Position	Points
1	92	(France) Alpine Renault	1	147
2	63	(Italy) Fiat	2	84
3	33	(France) Citroën	7	33
4	22	(Japan) Datsun	6	34
5	20	(Sweden) Saab	5	42
6	16	(United States) Ford	3	76
7	15	(East Germany) Wartburg	14	15
8	14	(Germany) Volkswagen	15	15
9	13	(Italy) Lancia	13	17
10	13	(France) Peugeot	16	13
11	12	(Poland) Polski Fiat	12	18
12	8	(Germany) Porsche	9	27
13	5	(Germany) Opel	11	25
14	4	(Germany) BMW	8	28
14	4	(Japan) Mitsubishi	17	4
14	4	(Sweden) Volvo	4	44
17	3	(Czechoslovakia) Škoda	18	3
18	2	(Japan) Toyota	10	25
19	1	(Germany) Audi	20	2
