= 1976 Rally Sweden =

Rallying motorsport event

1976 Swedish Rally 26th International Swedish Rally
- Round 2 of the 1976 World Rally Championship season
- Host country: Sweden
- Rally base: Karlstad
- Dates run: February 20, 1976 – February 22, 1976
- Stages: 34 (722 km; 449 miles)
- Stage surface: Snow & ice
- Overall distance: 1,620 km (1,010 miles)

Statistics
- Crews: 63 at start, 28 at finish

Overall results
- Overall winner: (Sweden) Per Eklund (Sweden) Björn Cederberg (Sweden) Saab; Saab 96 V4

The 1976 Swedish Rally (formally the 26th International Swedish Rally) was the second round of the 1976 World Rally Championship season. Swedish driver Per Eklund took the only WRC win of his career.

== Results ==
1976 Swedish Rally results
Finish		Total time	Group	Car #	Driver	Car	Mfr. points
Overall	In group	Total time	Group	Car #	Driver	Car	Mfr. points
1	1	29,306 pts	4	4	(Sweden) Per Eklund	Saab 96 V4	20
2	2	29,402 pts	4	2	(Sweden) Stig Blomqvist	Saab 96 V4	
3	1	30,670 pts	2	7	(Sweden) Anders Kullang	Opel Ascona	12
4	3	31,552 pts	4	3	(Finland) Simo Lampinen	Lancia Stratos HF	10
5	2	32,315 pts	2	82	(Sweden) Ulf Sundberg	Saab 99 EMS	
6	4	32,466 pts	4	6	(Sweden) Lars Carlsson	Opel Kadett GT/E	
7	5	32,727 pts	4	63	(Sweden) Soren Skanse	Volvo 142	4
8	6	32,827 pts	4	58	(Sweden) Sven-Inge Neby	Volvo 142	
9	3	32,850 pts	2	163	(Sweden) Ake Gustavsson	Saab 99 EMS	
10	4	33,371 pts	2	61	(Sweden) Kaj Fyhrqvist	Opel Ascona	
Retired			4	1	(Sweden) Bjorn Waldegard	Lancia Stratos HF	
Retired			2	5	(France) Bernard Fiorentino	Simca 1000	
Retired			4	8	(Sweden) Per-Inge Walfridsson	Lancia Stratos HF	
Retired			2	9	(Norway) John Haugland	Skoda 130	
Retired			4	19	(Sweden) Ingvar Carlsson	BMW 2002	
Retired			2	27	(Sweden) Bror Danielsson	Opel Kadett GT/E	

Source: Independent WRC archive

== Special stages ==
Stages of the 26th International Swedish Rally
Stage	Stage name	Distance	Winning driver	Time	Rally leader
SS1	Färjestad	16 km	Björn Waldegård	151s	Björn Waldegård
SS2	Toyota	18 km	Per Eklund	767s	Per Eklund
SS3	Arvika	18 km	Björn Waldegård	273s	Per Eklund
SS4	OK	10 km	Per Eklund	472s	Per Eklund
SS5	Opel	50 km	Per Eklund	1899s	Per Eklund
SS6	Monroe	20 km	Per Eklund	823s	Per Eklund
SS7	Branzells	7 km	Per Eklund	290s	Per Eklund
SS8	Sjömarks	12 km	Per Eklund	654s	Per Eklund
SS9	Honda Caravan	12 km	Stig Blomqvist	540s	Per Eklund
SS10	Vingresor	24 km	Björn Waldegård	1039s	Per Eklund
SS11	Lecab	16 km	Per Eklund	698s	Per Eklund
SS12	Pillerud	30 km	Stig Blomqvist	1092s	Per Eklund
SS13	Hella	26 km	Per Eklund	884s	Per Eklund
SS14	Eddeholm	70 km	Stig Blomqvist	2662s	Per Eklund
SS15	Gdg-Alpus	16 km	Per Eklund	713s	Per Eklund
SS16	Renault	35 km	Stig Blomqvist	1248s	Per Eklund
SS17	Kall Pa Macken	10 km	Per Eklund; Anders Kulläng	380s	Per Eklund
SS18	Ahlmarks	9 km	Per Eklund	257s	Per Eklund
SS19	Toyota	18 km	Per Eklund	783s	Per Eklund
SS20	OK	10 km	Per Eklund	465s	Per Eklund
SS21	Opel	50 km	Per Eklund	1895s	Per Eklund
SS22	Monroe	20 km	Per Eklund	798s	Per Eklund
SS23	Branzells	7 km	Per Eklund	290s	Per Eklund
SS24	Sjömarks	12 km	Per Eklund	675s	Per Eklund
SS25	Honda Caravan	12 km	Björn Waldegård	557s	Per Eklund
SS26	Vingresor	24 km	Per Eklund	1068s	Per Eklund
SS27	Lecab	16 km	Stig Blomqvist	736s	Per Eklund
SS28	Pillerud	30 km	Stig Blomqvist	1132s	Per Eklund
SS29	Hella	26 km	Per Eklund	896s	Per Eklund
SS30	Eddeholm	70 km	Stig Blomqvist	2779s	Per Eklund
SS31	Gdg Alpus	16 km	Per Eklund	724s	Per Eklund
SS32	Renault	35 km	Stig Blomqvist	1231s	Per Eklund
SS33	Kall Pa Macken	10 km	Stig Blomqvist	397s	Per Eklund
SS34	Ahlmarks	9 km	Stig Blomqvist	258s	Per Eklund
