= 1973 Austrian Alpine Rally =

Rallying motorsport event

1973 Austrian Rally: 44. Austrian Alpine Rally
Round 9 of the 1973 World Rally Championship season
← Previous event	Next event →
- Host country: Austria
- Rally base: Baden, Austria
- Dates run: 12 September 1973 – 14 September 1973
- Stages: 27 (310 km; 190 miles)
- Stage surface: Gravel
- Overall distance: 2,233 km (1,388 miles)

Statistics
- Crews: 74 at start, 25 at finish

Overall results
- Overall winner: (Germany) Achim Warmbold (France) Jean Todt (Germany) BMW; BMW 2002 TII

The 1973 Austrian Rally (formally the 44. Austrian Alpine Rally) was the ninth round of the inaugural World Rally Championship season. Run in mid-September around Baden, Austria, the rally was entirely on gravel surface special stages. 1973 would be the only year to see the WRC hold an event in Austria, despite the strong presence of Austrian drivers in the series through the present.

== Report ==
In 1973, and for several years afterward, only manufacturers were given points for finishes in WRC events. Austria hosted BMW's first ever win of the World Rally Championship, with front-runners Alpine-Renault, Saab, and Fiat also making strong bids for points.

== Results ==
1973 Austrian Rally results
Finish		Total time	Group	Car #	Driver Co-driver	Car	Mfr. points
Overall	In group	Total time	Group	Car #	Driver Co-driver	Car	Mfr. points
1	1	3 h : 58 m : 55.5 s	2	8	(West Germany) Achim Warmbold (France) Jean Todt	(West Germany) BMW 2002 TII	20
2	1	4 h : 0 m : 10.1 s	4	2	(France) Bernard Darniche (France) Alain Mahé	(France) Alpine-Renault A110 1800	15
3	2	4 h : 0 m : 11.2 s	2	15	(Sweden) Per Eklund (Sweden) Bo Reinicke	(Sweden) Saab 96 V4	12
4	3	4 h : 1 m : 10.5 s	2	16	(Sweden) Björn Waldegård (Sweden) Hans Thorszelius	(West Germany) BMW 2002 TII	10
5	2	4 h : 1 m : 25.8 s	4	11	(France) Jean-Pierre Nicolas (France) Michel Vial	(France) Alpine-Renault A110 1800	
6	3	4 h : 6 m : 15.9 s	4	3	(Sweden) Håkan Lindberg (Italy) Helmut Eisendle	(Italy) Fiat Abarth 124 Rallye	6
7	4	4 h : 6 m : 38.3 s	4	5	(Austria) Klaus Russling (Austria) Wolfgang Weiß	(West Germany) Porsche 911	4
8	4	4 h : 9 m : 5.8 s	2	9	(Sweden) Ove Andersson (Sweden) Gunnar Häggbom	(Japan) Toyota Celica	3
9	5	4 h : 10 m : 2.2 s	2	17	(Austria) Herbert Grünsteidl (Austria) Georg Hopf	(West Germany) BMW 2002	
10	6	4 h : 11 m : 16.9 s	2	12	(United Kingdom) Tony Fall (United Kingdom) Mike Wood	(West Germany) Volkswagen 1303S	1
11	7	4 h : 11 m : 48.5 s	2	6	(Sweden) Harry Källström (Sweden) Claes Billstam	(West Germany) Volkswagen 1303S	
12	8	4 h : 14 m : 35.8 s	2	25	(Austria) Franz Wittman (Austria) Hans Siebert	(West Germany) Volkswagen 1303S	
13	9	4 h : 20 m : 17.1 s	2	24	(Sweden) Gunnar Blomqvist (Austria) Gerhard Kalnay	(West Germany) Opel Ascona	
14	1	4 h : 35 m : 14.1 s	1	27	(Austria) Vic Dietmayer	(West Germany) BMW 2002	
15	10	4 h : 48 m : 31.8 s	2	47	(Austria) H. Steinwender (Austria) F. Mick	(Italy) Fiat 124	
16	2	4 h : 58 m : 23.7 s	1	29	(Austria) Walter Zöckl (Austria) Günther Böhs	(West Germany) BMW 2002	
Retired (accident)			2	1	(Austria) Günther Janger (Austria) Harald Gottlieb	(West Germany) Volkswagen 1303S	
Retired (mechanical)			2	4	(West Germany) Walter Röhrl (West Germany) Jochen Berger	(West Germany) Opel Ascona	
Retired (mechanical)			2	4	(Sweden) Stig Blomqvist (Sweden) Arne Hertz	(Sweden) Saab 96 V4	
Retired (accident)			4	10	(Italy) Raffaele Pinto (Italy) Arnaldo Bernacchini	(Italy) Fiat Abarth 124 Rallye	
Retired (mechanical)			4	14	(Italy) Alcide Paganelli (Italy) Ninni Russo	(Italy) Fiat Abarth 124 Rallye	
Retired			4	19	(Austria) Walter Roser (Austria) Erich Bazalka	(France) Alpine-Renault A110 1600	
Retired (mechanical)			2	21	(Austria) Richard Bochnicek (Austria) Sepp-Dieter Kernmayer	(France) Citroën DS 23	

Source: Independent WRC archive

== Championship standings after the event ==
1973 World Rally Championship for Manufacturers points standings after round 8
After round 8		Team	Season end	
Position	Points	Team	Position	Points
1	107	(France) Alpine Renault	1	147
2	69	(Italy) Fiat	2	84
3	42	(Sweden) Saab	5	42
4	36	(United States) Ford	3	76
5	33	(France) Citroën	7	33
6	24	(Germany) BMW	8	28
7	24	(Germany) Porsche	9	27
8	22	(Japan) Datsun	6	34
9	19	(Sweden) Volvo	4	44
10	15	(East Germany) Wartburg	14	15
11	14	(Germany) Volkswagen	15	15
12	13	(Italy) Lancia	13	17
13	13	(France) Peugeot	16	13
14	13	(Germany) Opel	11	25
15	12	(Poland) Polski Fiat	12	18
16	5	(Japan) Toyota	10	25
17	4	(Japan) Mitsubishi	17	4
18	3	(Czechoslovakia) Škoda	18	3
19	1	(Germany) Audi	20	2
