= 1973 1000 Lakes Rally =

Motor rally competition

1973 1000 Lakes Rally 23rd 1000 Lakes Rally
- Round 8 of the 1973 World Rally Championship season
- Host country: Finland
- Rally base: Jyväskylä, Finland
- Dates run: 3 August 1973 – 5 August 1973
- Stages: 43 (517 km; 321 miles)
- Stage surface: Gravel
- Overall distance: 2,079 km (1,292 miles)

Statistics
- Crews: 109 at start, 55 at finish

Overall results
- Overall winner: (Finland) Timo Mäkinen (United Kingdom) Henry Liddon (United Kingdom) Ford Motor Company Ltd

The 1973 1000 Lakes Rally (formally the 23rd 1000 Lakes Rally) was the 23rd running of the 1000 Lakes Rally (currently known as the Rally Finland), and the eighth round of the inaugural World Rally Championship season.

== Report ==
Run in early August in central Finland, this rally marked a distinct change from the previous event in the series, the 33 Rajd Polski. Unlike that event, in which only three teams survived to the finish, Finland saw 55 teams finish the rally, a success rate of almost exactly 50% of the total entries.

In 1973, and for several years afterward, only manufacturers were given points for finishes in WRC events. Finland hosted Ford Motor Company's first ever win of the World Rally Championship. Championship front runners Alpine Renault and Fiat were conspicuous by their absence, with neither gaining points during the round.

== Results ==
1973 1000 Lakes Rally results
Finish		Total time	Group	Car #	Driver Co-driver	Car	Mfr. points
Overall	In group	Total time	Group	Car #	Driver Co-driver	Car	Mfr. points
1	1	4 h : 53 m : 50 s	2	4	(Finland) Timo Mäkinen (United Kingdom) Henry Liddon	(United Kingdom) Ford Escort RS1600	20
2	2	4 h : 55 m : 59 s	2	29	(Finland) Markku Alén (Finland) Juhani Toivonen	(Sweden) Volvo 142	15
3	1	4 h : 57 m : 12 s	4	3	(Finland) Leo Kinnunen (Finland) Atso Aho	(Germany) Porsche 911	12
4	3	4 h : 59 m : 28 s	2	1	(Finland) Simo Lampinen (United Kingdom) John Davenport	(Sweden) Saab 96 V4	10
5	4	5 h : 3 m : 30 s	2	30	(Finland) Antti Ojanen (Finland) Heikki Miikki	(Germany) Opel Ascona 19	8
6	5	5 h : 4 m : 3 s	2	38	(Finland) Ulf Grönholm (Finland) Henry Laine	(Germany) Opel Ascona 19	
7	6	5 h : 5 m : 43 s	2	26	(Finland) Tapio Rainio (Finland) Erkki Nyman	(Sweden) Saab 96 V4	
8	2	5 h : 9 m : 43 s	4	122	(West Germany) Achim Warmbold (France) Jean Todt	(Italy) Fiat Abarth 124 Rallye	
9	7	5 h : 11 m : 26 s	2	39	(Finland) Pertti Lehtonen (Finland) Ilkka Kivimäki	(Sweden) Saab 96 V4	
10	8	5 h : 11 m : 36 s	2	12	(Finland) Hannu Palin (Finland) Jyrki Ahava	(Germany) Opel Ascona 19	
11	9	5 h : 14 m : 25 s	2	20	(Finland) Esa Nuuttila (Finland) Alf Krogell	(Germany) Opel Ascona 19	
12	10	5 h : 18 m : 23 s	2	24	(Finland) Erkki Pitkänen (Finland) Juhani Paalama	(Sweden) Volvo 142	
13	1	5 h : 18 m : 52 s	1	50	(Finland) Pertti Kärhä (Finland) Seppo Siitonen	(Italy) Alfa Romeo 2000 GTV	
14	2	5 h : 22 m : 15 s	1	42	(Finland) Jaakko Markula (Finland) Asko Nevalainen	(Italy) Alfa Romeo 2000 GTV	
15	11	5 h : 23 m : 35 s	2	21	(Finland) Markku Saaristo (Finland) Ilkka Saaristo	(Czechoslovakia) Škoda 120S	
16	12	5 h : 23 m : 49 s	2	7	(United Kingdom) Brian Culcheth (United Kingdom) Johnstone Syer	(United Kingdom) Morris Marina	
17	3	5 h : 24 m : 47 s	1	52	(Finland) Timo Sohlberg (Finland) Matti Honkavaara	(Germany) BMW 2002	
18	13	5 h : 30 m : 54 s	2	63	(Finland) Eeva Heinonen (Finland) Seija Saaristo	(Sweden) Volvo 142	
19	4	5 h : 38 m : 54 s	1	44	(Finland) Erkki Pahkinen (Finland) Jarmo Toivonen	(Germany) Opel Ascona 19	
20	5	5 h : 44 m : 41 s	1	73	(Finland) Timo Jouhki (Finland) Juha Piironen	(Germany) Opel Ascona 19	
21	6	5 h : 45 m : 4 s	1	58	(Finland) Juha Leponiemi (Finland) Matti Vilmi	(Germany) BMW 2002	
22	7	5 h : 46 m : 5 s	1	51	(Finland) Kauko Mäkelä (Finland) Jukka Miettinen	(France) Peugeot 304S	
23	8	5 h : 48 m : 14 s	1	53	(Finland) Hans Sevelius (Finland) Göran Sandström	(Italy) Alfa Romeo 1600	
24	14	5 h : 50 m : 52 s	2	61	(Finland) Marketta Oksala (Finland) Satu Valtaharju	(Germany) Opel Ascona 19	
27	16	5 h : 55 m : 7 s	2	86	(Soviet Union) Stasys Brundza (Soviet Union) Viktor Ilyin	(Soviet Union) Moskvitch 412	
39	22	6 h : 16 m : 10 s	2	96	(East Germany) Peter Hommel (East Germany) Günter Bork	(East Germany) Wartburg 353	
42	17	6 h : 22 m : 8 s	1	79	(East Germany) Horst Niebergall (East Germany) Harald Würfel	(East Germany) Wartburg 353	
46	21	6 h : 27 m : 27 s	1	77	(East Germany) Egon Culmbacher (East Germany) Werner Ernst	(East Germany) Wartburg 353	
Retired (mechanical)			2	2	(Sweden) Stig Blomqvist (Sweden) Arne Hertz	(Sweden) Saab 96 V4	
Retired (illness)			2	5	(Finland) Hannu Mikkola (Finland) Erkki Rautanen	(Sweden) Volvo 142	
Retired (mechanical)			4	6	(Kenya) Shekhar Mehta (Finland) Ensio Mikander	(Japan) Datsun 240Z	
Retired (mechanical)			2	8	(Sweden) Per Eklund (Sweden) Björn Cederberg	(Sweden) Saab 96 V4	
Retired			2	9	(Finland) Pauli Toivonen (Finland) Martti Tiukkanen	(France) Simca 1000 Rallye	
Retired			1	10	(France) Guy Chasseuil (France) Christian Baron	(France) Simca 1000 Rallye	
Retired			1	11	(Belgium) Jean-Marie Jacquemin (Belgium) Dorothé Jacquemin	(France) Simca 1000 Rallye	
Retired			2	13	(Finland) Pekka Virtanen (Finland) Jussi Eskola	(Sweden) Volvo 142	
Retired			2	15	(Finland) Matti Alamaula (Finland) Tapio Siekkinen	(Germany) Opel Ascona 19	
Retired			2	16	(United States) Bob Hourihan (Canada) Doug Woods	(Japan) Datsun 1800 SSS	
Retired			2	18	(Finland) Pekka Vilpponen (Finland) Ilpo Airila	(Soviet Union) Moskvitch 1500M	
Retired (mechanical)			2	22	(Finland) Pentti Airikkala (Finland) Heikki Haaksiala	(Germany) Opel Kadett Rallye	
Retired			2	25	(United Kingdom) Paul Faulkner (United Kingdom) Monty Peters	(United Kingdom) Ford Escort RS1600	
Retired			2	27	(United States) Scott Harvey (United States) Tom King	(United States) Dodge Colt	
Retired (mechanical)			2	28	(Finland) Jari Vilkas (Finland) Juhani Soini	(Sweden) Saab 96 V4	
Retired			2	33	(Sweden) Leif Asterhag (Sweden) Claes Billstam	(Germany) BMW 2002	
Retired			2	35	(Sweden) Lars Carlsson (West Germany) Thomas Fischer-Halbing	(Germany) Opel Commodore GS/E	
Retired			2	36	(Finland) Eero Soutulahti (Finland) Risto Anttila	(Sweden) Volvo 142	
Retired			2	40	(Finland) Hannu Valtaharju (Finland) Raimo Alm	(Germany) Opel Ascona 19	
Retired			1	46	(Finland) Esko Nuuttila (Finland) Timo Harju	(Germany) Opel Ascona 19	
Retired			1	47	(Finland) Kyösti Hämäläinen (Finland) Veijo Aho	(Italy) Alfa Romeo 2000 GTV	
Retired			1	48	(Sweden) Arne Allansson (Sweden) Rolf Jägerstedt	(Germany) BMW 2002	
Retired			1	57	(Finland) Heikki Enomaa (Finland) Timo Alanen	(Germany) BMW 2002	
Retired			2	67	(Finland) Fredrik Donner (Finland) Heikki Nikki	(Germany) Opel Ascona 19	
Retired			2	76	(Soviet Union) Kastytis Girdauskas (Soviet Union) Valentin Kislykh	(Soviet Union) Moskvitch 412	

Source: Independent WRC archive

== Championship standings after the event ==
1973 World Rally Championship for Manufacturers points standings after round 8
After round 8		Team	Season end	
Position	Points	Team	Position	Points
1	92	(France) Alpine Renault	1	147
2	63	(Italy) Fiat	2	84
3	36	(United States) Ford	3	76
4	33	(France) Citroën	7	33
5	30	(Sweden) Saab	5	42
6	22	(Japan) Datsun	6	34
7	20	(Germany) Porsche	9	27
8	19	(Sweden) Volvo	4	44
9	15	(East Germany) Wartburg	14	15
10	14	(Germany) Volkswagen	15	15
11	13	(France) Peugeot	16	13
12	13	(Italy) Lancia	13	17
13	13	(Germany) Opel	11	25
14	12	(Poland) Polski Fiat	12	18
15	4	(Germany) BMW	8	28
15	4	(Japan) Mitsubishi	17	4
17	3	(Czechoslovakia) Škoda	18	3
18	2	(Japan) Toyota	10	25
19	1	(Germany) Audi	20	2
