= A310 (disambiguation) =

The Airbus A310 is a 1982 medium- to long-range widebody airliner created by Airbus Industrie.

A310 may also refer to:

- A310 road (Great Britain), a road connecting Kingston upon Thames to Brentford
- Acorn Archimedes A310, a British home computer
- Alpine A310, a 1971 French sports car
