= AXK =

AXK may refer to:

- African Express Airways (ICAO: AXK), a Kenyan airline that operates domestic and international passenger services
- Aka language (ISO 639-3: AXK), a Bantu language spoken in the Central African Republic and the Republic of Congo

== See also ==
- AxK
