= Renault Fuego =

Car model produced by Renault

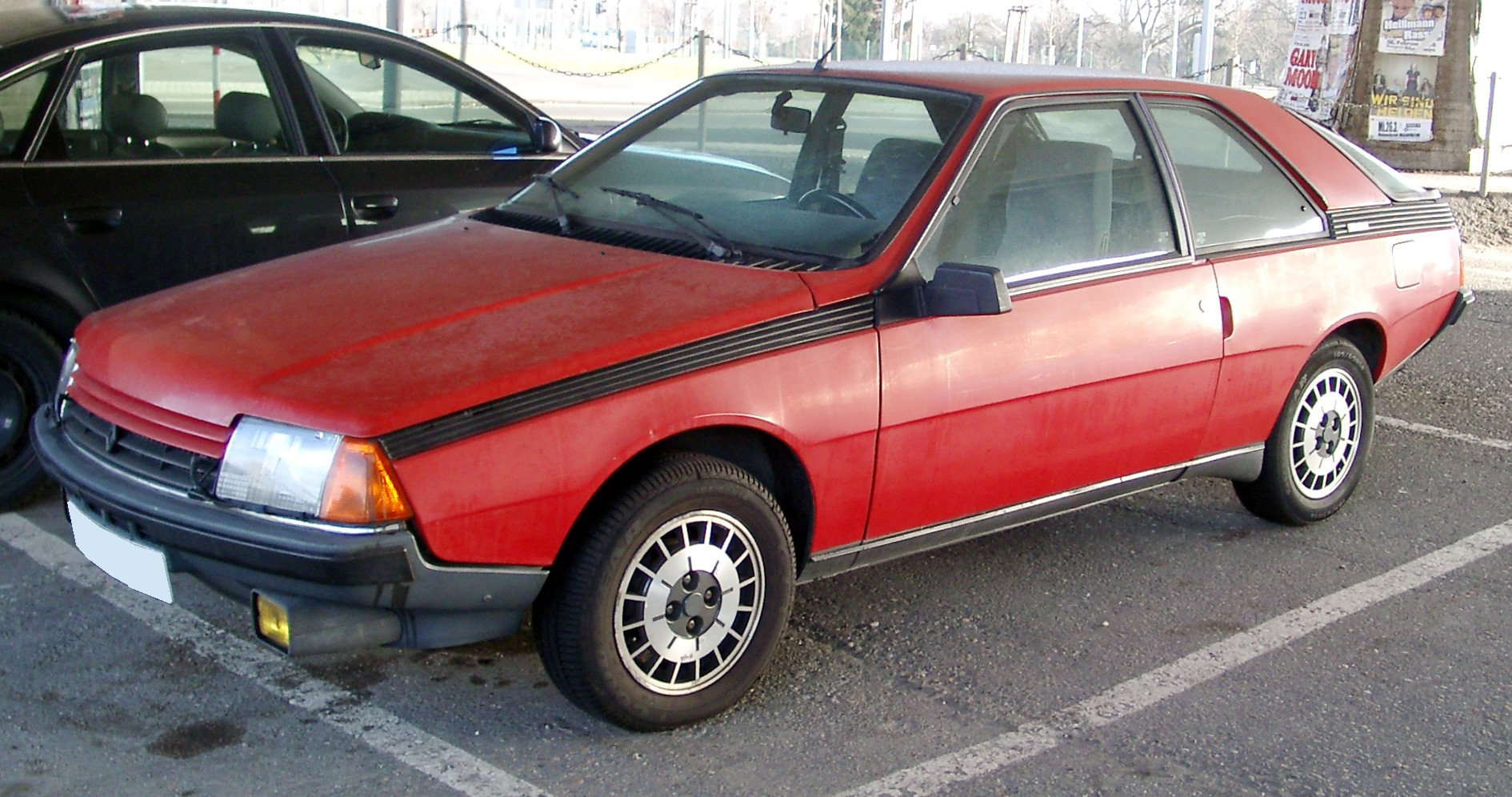
- 1984 Renault Fuego GTX

Overview
- Manufacturer: Renault
- Production: February 1980–1986 (Europe); 1982–1992 (South America)
- Assembly: France: Boulogne-Billancourt (RSAS: 1980–1985); France: Maubeuge (MCA: 1979–1985); Argentina: Santa Isabel (Renault Argentina: 1982–1992); Argentina: Buenos Aires (Renault Argentina: 1983–1992); Chile: Los Andes (Automotores Franco Chilena); Spain: Palencia (RESA:1980–1986); Venezuela: Mariara (1983–1988)
- Designer: Michel Jardin, Francois Lampreia, and Robert Opron

Body and chassis
- Class: Sport compact
- Body style: 3-door liftback
- Layout: FF layout
- Related: Renault 18

Powertrain
- Engine: 1,397 cc I4; 1,565 cc A5L turbo I4; 1,647 cc type 841/843/A2M I4; 1,995 cc type 829/J6R I4; 2,165 cc J7T I4; 2,068 cc J8S td I4
- Transmission: 4-speed manual; 5-speed manual; 3-speed automatic

Dimensions
- Wheelbase: 2,443 mm (96.2 in)
- Length: 4,358 mm (171.6 in)
- Width: 1,692 mm (66.6 in)
- Height: 1,315 mm (51.8 in)

Chronology
- Predecessor: Renault 15 and 17
- Successor: Renault GTA (USA)

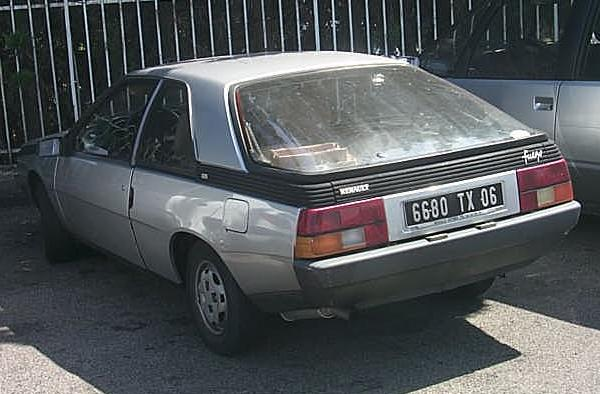
Renault Fuego TS 1.6

The Renault Fuego (Fire in Spanish) is a sports hatchback manufactured and marketed by Renault from 1980 to 1986, replacing the Renault 15 and 17 coupés of the 1970s.

A total of 265,367 Fuegos were produced, approximately 85% of which were assembled in Maubeuge, France, from February 1980 until October 1985. Spanish production for European markets continued into 1986.

Cars built in France were imported and marketed in the United States by American Motors Corporation (AMC). The Turbo version went on sale in the U.S. in 1982, a year before its launch in France.

== Design ==
The Fuego's exterior was styled by Michel Jardin and the interior by Francois Lampreia, both working under the direction of Robert Opron. The coupé's distinctive styling by Opron featured a glass hatchback that offered large cargo utility.

Renault unveiled a new model badged "Fuego" at the 1980 Geneva Auto Show as a successor to the R15 and R17, and planned the coupé to be named R19. The Fuego was heavily based on the Renault 18, sharing its floorpan and drivetrain, with its front suspension developed from the larger Renault 20/30. Despite sharing no parts, the design kept the familiar double-wishbone layout common with the Renault 18, incorporating a negative scrub radius geometry. The suspension design would later be added to the facelifted Renault 18, and later, with minor refinements such as larger bushings, the Renault 25. Power steering was available at the higher end of the range. The Fuego dashboard was added to the facelifted R18 in 1984 (though initially only available in the R18 Turbo) and then both updated again in September 1983 (LHD cars only) for the 1984 model year.

European production continued until 1985 in France and until 1986 in Spain, while Renault Argentina produced the Fuego from 1982 until 1992, ending production with the 2.2 L "GTA Max" (the final phase III facelift introduced in 1990). In Argentina, it reached 63% of local parts integration.

Automotive journalist L. J. K. Setright said the Fuego "is blessed with a body which is not only roomy and aerodynamically efficient, but is also beautiful". Wind tunnel testing was used to allow the Fuego to have sporty coupé lines while maximizing rear seat space. The resulting drag coefficient (Cd) factor ranges from 0.32 to 0.35. In 1982, the turbocharged diesel Fuego was declared the fastest production passenger diesel car in the world, with a top speed of 180 km/h (112 mph).

The Fuego was one of the first cars to offer a remote keyless system with central locking, available from September 1982, using a system invented by Frenchman Paul Lipschutz — marketed as the PLIP remote in Europe, after its inventor. The Fuego was also the first to feature a remote steering-wheel-mounted audio system controls (on the European LHD GTX and Turbo from September 1983). This feature was subsequently popularised on the 1984 model Renault 25. The Fuego was also available with options including leather upholstery, a multifunction trip computer, cruise control, air-conditioning (factory- or dealer-installed), and a full-length Webasto electric fabric sunroof.

== Marketing ==
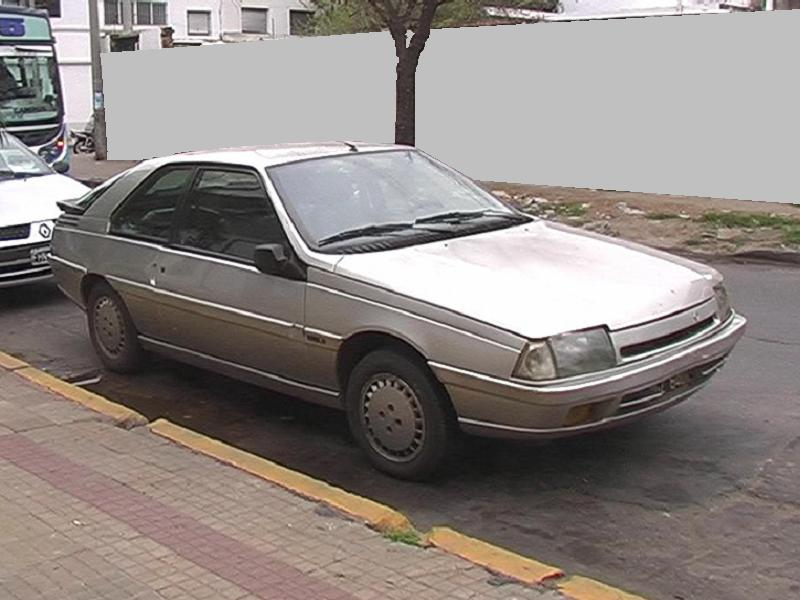
Fuego GTA Max (Argentina)

=== Europe ===
The Fuego became the best-selling coupé in Europe from 1980 through 1982. Variants included: 1.4 L TL, 1.6 L economy tuned GTL (LHD only); 1.6 L TS and GTS (manual and automatic transmissions); 2.0 L TX and GTX (manual and automatic transmissions). The TX was a downgraded version of the GTX, but the differences varied by country. This model omitted alloy wheels, electric windows, central locking, air conditioning, fog lights, headlight wipers, etc., depending on the market. A manual-only 2.1 L turbo-diesel was also produced for LHD European markets during 1982–1985. This model was distinguished by the "bulge" at the top of the bonnet, extra vents in the front bumper, and "Turbo D" badging on the grille, side, and rear hatch glass.

The Fuego Turbo (1.6 L/1565cc with a manual transmission) was introduced in 1983 to coincide with the facelift. This facelift included a revised front grille, plastic trim on the bumpers, revised dashboard on LHD models, wheel design, interior trim, and fabrics - sepia (coffee brown) with dark brown/white striped velour seats; or ash (grey) with black/red striped velour seats for the Turbo, and ash or sepia for the other models sold with European specifications. Interior colour now depended on exterior colour, eliminating the wide range of customised options available on previous models. The facelifted GTX was also offered with the 2.2 L EFI engine from the Renault 25 in certain LHD markets (generally where the Fuego Turbo was not sold).

=== United States ===
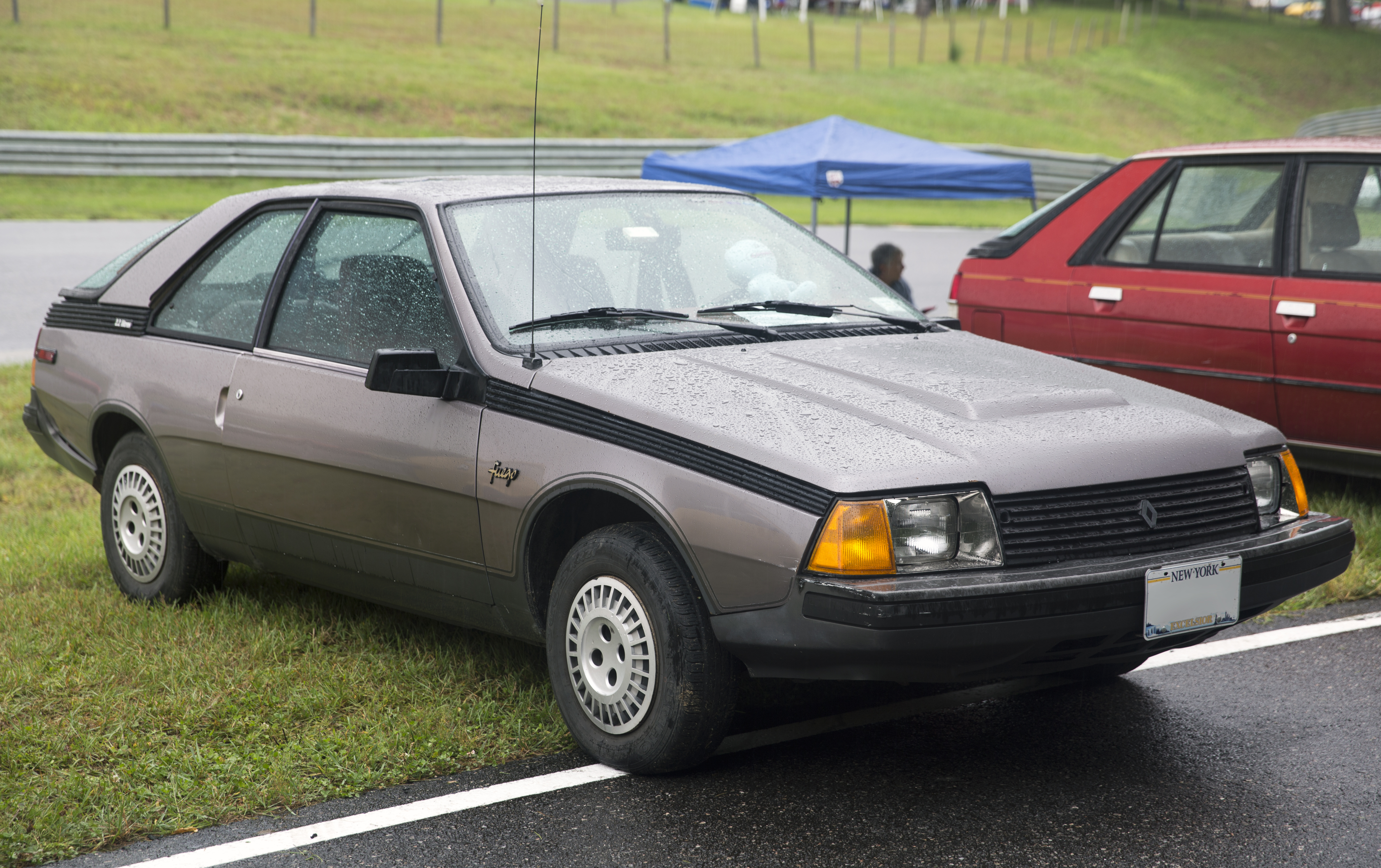
US-spec 1984 Renault Fuego 2.2 L. Note the sealed beam headlamps

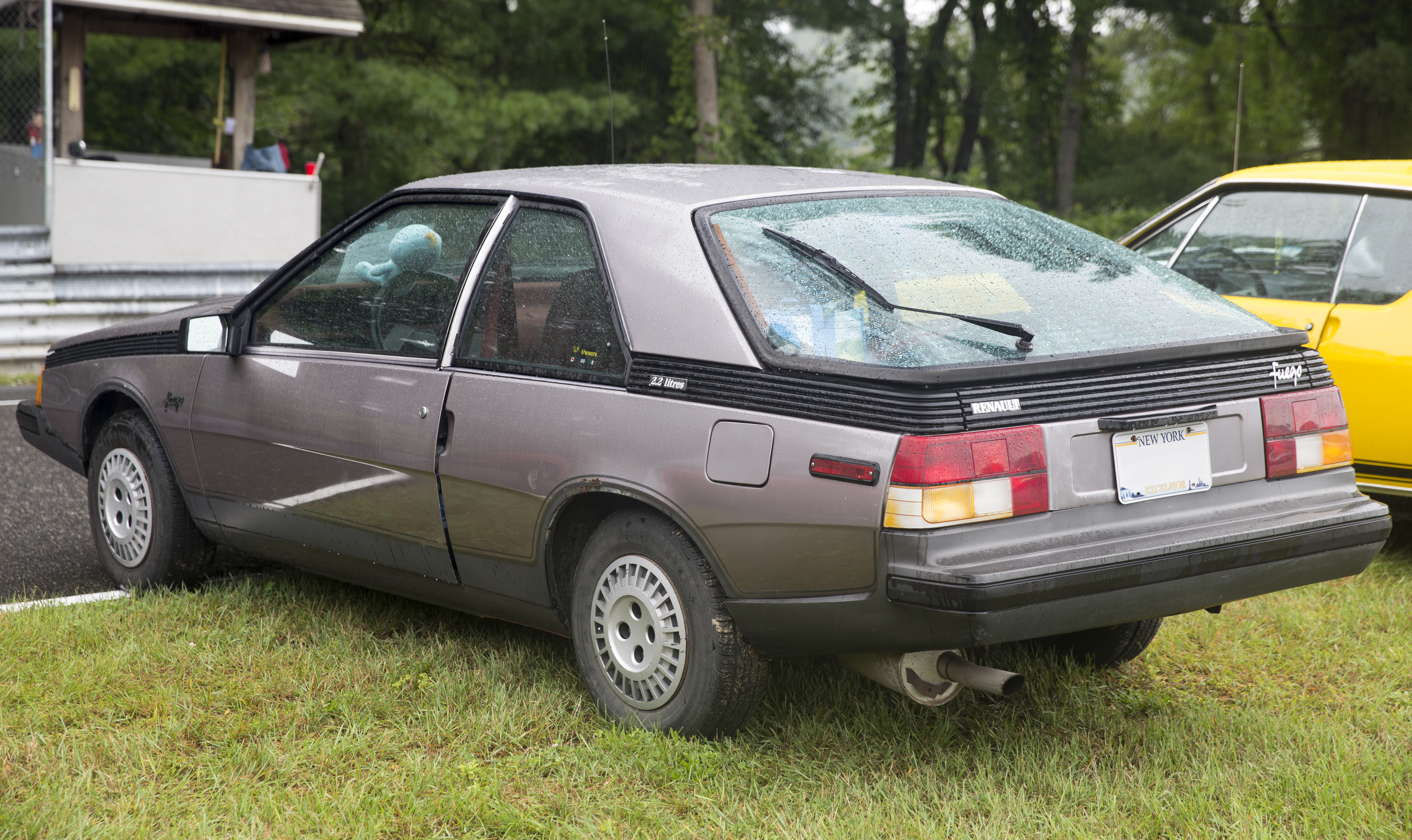
US-spec 1984 Renault Fuego 2.2 L (rear view)

The Renault Fuego was marketed in the United States through American Motors Corporation (AMC) dealers from 1982 until 1985. The car underwent several modifications to meet U.S. regulations, including reinforced front and rear bumpers that increased its length from 4,358 to 4,540 mm (171.6 to 178.7 in), rectangular sealed beam headlights situated deeper in their housings, rear side marker lights, as well as unique body striping and wheel designs. A combination of automatic transmission with cruise control was available for U.S.-specification cars as well as a visibility group that included a rear window wiper and right side exterior mirror. Leather upholstery was optional as well as power windows and door locks.

The U.S.-spec Fuego came with a variety of features and powertrain options. For the 1982 and 1983 model years, it was offered with either a fuel-injected turbocharged 1.6 L (1565cc) or a normally aspirated version (1647cc). The engine lineup was revised for 1984, introducing a 2.2 L engine available with manual or automatic transmissions, in addition to the turbo model. By 1985, only the 2.2 L engine was offered. The Fuego was a practical four-passenger hatchback coupé offering 39 mpg_{‑US} (6.0 L/100 km; 47 mpg_{‑imp}) on the highway and a $8,495 base price.

The Fuego received generally good reviews. MotorWeek praised the 1982 model for its stylish design, standard features including an electric sunroof, and a combination of 30 mpg_{‑US} (7.8 L/100 km; 36 mpg_{‑imp}) with 80 kW (107 hp; 108 PS) performance. However, the same review noted some drawbacks, including subpar braking and noticeable understeer.

Despite the generally favorable reports, the Fuego failed to improve Renault's market position in the United States significantly. Sales steadily declined, and by 1984, AMC dealers were offered rebates of up to $1,000 to move the cars off their lots. Imports of the Fuego ultimately ended in 1985.

==== Convertible ====
Renault was seeking greater brand exposure in the United States and commissioned the French coachbuilder Heuliez to develop a Fuego-based convertible. The prototype was unveiled the Paris Motor Show in October 1982, but aimed at the U.S. market. American specifications included sealed-beam headlights, side indicator lights, stronger bumpers, and a catalytic converter for the exhaust system. Reportedly, three examples were built with leather upholstery and white tops.

The concept car was well-received in Paris, and Renault considered including the convertible in the model line by using Heuliez as a subcontractor for the conversion. However, Renault did not pursue the proposal due to lower-than-expected sales of the Fuego coupé in the American market. Development of the sub-compact Renault Alliance convertible with American Sunroof Corporation expertise was underway for 1985 model year production by AMC in Kenosha, WI.

=== United Kingdom ===
Renault sold the Fuego in the UK, targeting the market segment occupied by the Opel Manta and Ford Capri. It became the top-selling coupé during 1981 and 1982. The available trims beginning in 1980–81 with the TL, GTS, and GTX, before increasing to the TL, TS, GTS, GTS Automatic, TX, and GTX manual in 1981–82; TL, TS, GTS, GTS Automatic, TX, GTX, GTX Automatic in 1982–83; TL, GTS, TX, GTX Automatic, and Turbo in 1983–84, and down to just two (GTS and Turbo) during 1985 and 1986 as sales declined.

=== Australia ===
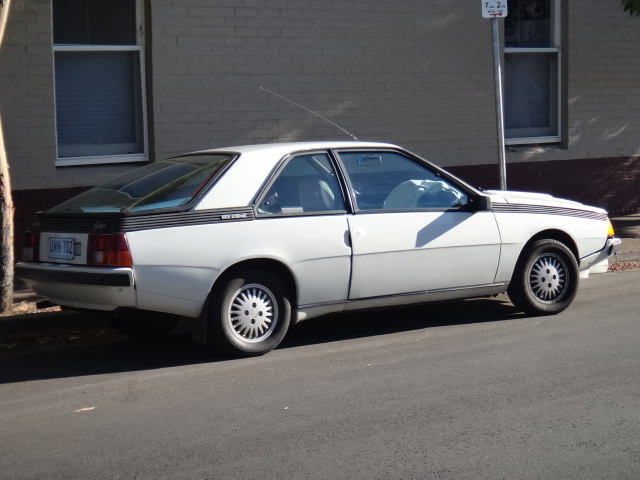
1982 Renault Fuego GTX (Australia)

In Australia, the 2 L GTX manual was the main model from 1982 to 1987, fully specified with factory air conditioning, TRX alloy wheels, a passenger mirror with remote control, but no trip computer. There was also a limited run of the more basic TX models. The Australian specifications included side intrusion beams in the doors and emission controls to meet Australian Design Rules. Aftermarket alloy wheels were often fitted because the cars came with a wheel that would accept only a specific Michelin tyre.

=== New Zealand ===
In New Zealand, the UK specification GTS and GTX manuals were delivered from late 1981 into 1982; GTS, GTS Automatic, GTX, GTX Automatic in 1983; GTX, GTX Automatic, Turbo in 1984; GTX Automatic and Turbo in 1985; GTX (end of line Australian specification GTX models imported from Australia), GTX Automatic, and Turbo in 1986.

== Timeline ==
- February 1980 - Introduction of the Fuego three-door coupé. Available as TL with a 1397 cc engine (rated at 64 PS (47 kW; 63 hp), with manual choke), "GTL" with a lower power output (economy tuned) 1647 cc engine, and GTS with the regular 1647 cc engine (rated at 96 PS (71 kW; 95 hp), with automatic choke), with a four-speed manual gearbox on the TL and GTL, five-speed manual or three-speed automatic gearbox on the GTS. The TL has a basic equipment level with 155 SRx13 tyres, a heated rear window, a rear fog light, a split-fold rear seat, and cloth upholstery. The GTL adds 175/70x13 tyres, electric front windows, tachometer, height-adjustable steering wheel, front head restraints, analogue clock, wheel covers, remote-adjustable driver's door mirror, laminated windscreen, opening rear quarter windows, H4 headlights, pre-installed radio kit, and velour upholstery. The GTS adds an engine oil-level gauge, power-assisted steering, and an optional three-speed automatic transmission. 185/65xHR14 light alloy wheels are optional.
- 1981 - Fuel reserve warning light standard on all models, the four- and five-speed manuals were modified and some had their ratios adjusted. Introduction of the TX and GTX with 1995 cc engine (rated at 110 PS or 81 kW or 108 hp) and five-speed manual gearbox. The TX has the same specification as the GTS, except for series mounted 14-inches wheels though equipped with steel rims rather than alloy, with the GTX gaining front fog lights, headlamp wash-wipe, 14-inch alloy wheels (185/65xHR14 tires), leather on the steering wheel rim, gear lever gaiter, and handbrake lever gaiter, as well as a digital clock, optional passenger side door mirror, bronze tinted windows, luggage cover, and airhorn. The optional three-speed automatic transmission now available on the 2 L TX and GTX in addition to the 1.6 L, beginning in September 1981.
- 1982 - The GTL is upgraded to a five-speed gearbox, while the automatic switched from the 1.6 L to the torquier 2 L engine. The GTS gains electronic ignition. The GTS, TX (depending on the country), and GTX gain remote central locking. The 2.1 L turbo diesel is introduced to certain LHD European markets. The 1.6 L fuel-injected and turbo are versions are introduced in the United States through Renault/American Motors dealers.
- 1983 - The GTL gains an economy tuned 73 PS (54 kW; 72 hp) version of the 1647 cc engine and a five-speed gearbox, while electronic ignition becomes standard across the range. The Fuego also becomes more aerodynamic, with small spoilers and deflectors as well as smooth hubcaps added.
- 1984 - The new 1984 model year facelift (from October 1983) consolidated the range but also added the top-of-the-range Turbo model to the European lineup. The facelift included a new grille, bumpers, wheel design, and interior trim (as well as a redesigned dashboard for LHD vehicles). A limited production run of turbos fitted with EFi was produced for the Swiss market to meet their emission controls. A 2.2 L EFi version of the GTX is introduced to certain LHD markets. Models sold in the United States are equipped with either the 1.6 L turbo or 2.2 L engines (manual or automatic) and an updated interior.
- 1985 - Production of the Fuego ends in France, with the introduction of the Renault 21.
- 1986 - Production ends in Spain. Production lines transferred to Argentina and Venezuela.
- 1987 - Production continues in Argentina (where the only available engine is the 2165 cc producing 116 PS or 85 kW or 114 hp) and Venezuela.
- 1990 - The final phase III GTA is introduced with new bumpers, white front indicators, and charcoal taillights. The higher performance GTA Max is introduced in Argentina with a 2.2 L engine tuned by Berta Motorsport, producing 123 PS (90 kW; 121 hp).
- 1992 - South American production ends.

Another model in the Renault range did not directly replace the Fuego. A Fuego II was planned, similarly styled as the new Renault Alpine GTA. However, the development of the new model was cancelled at the last minute due to a combination of Renault's financial problems along with the declining demand for sports coupés in the marketplace at that time.
