= Renault 12 =

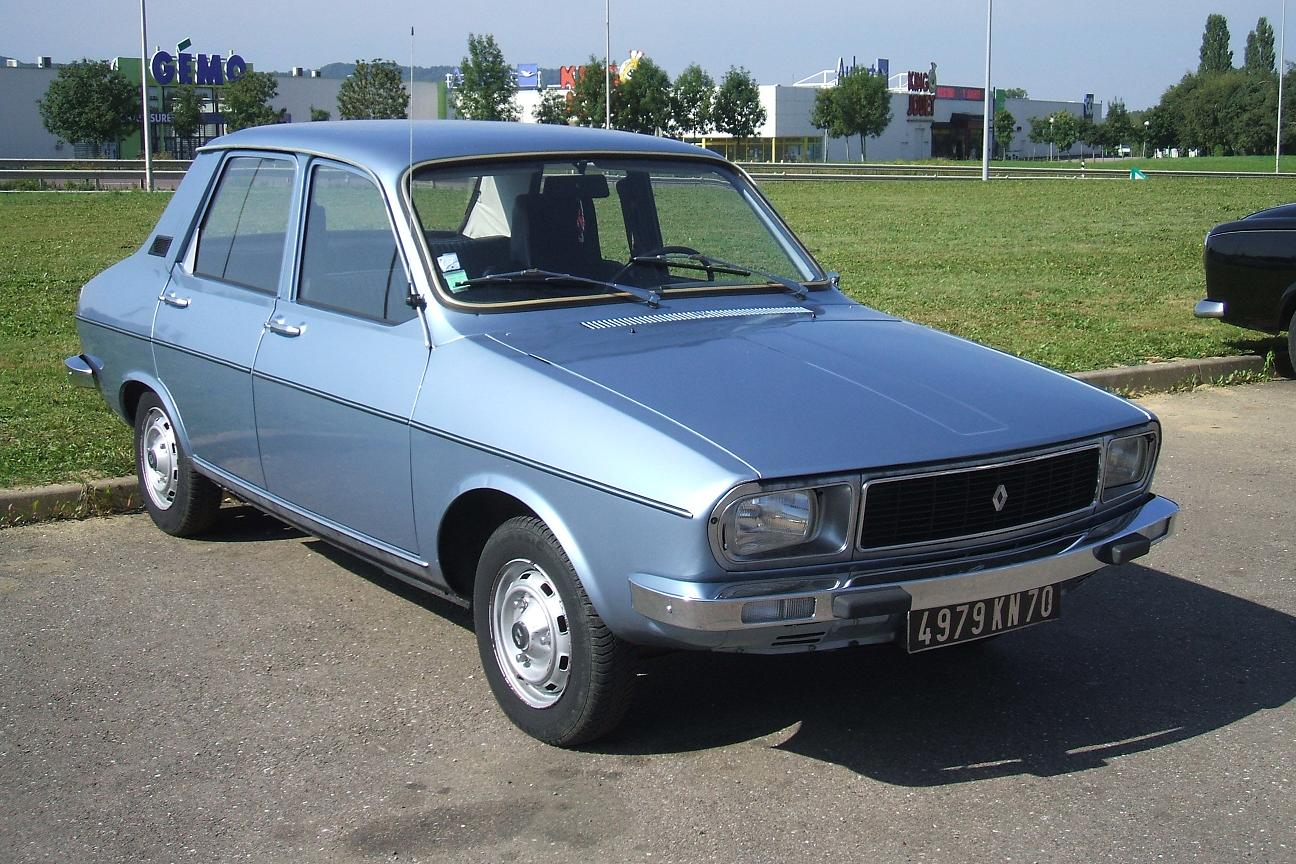

Overview
- Manufacturer: Renault
- Also called: Renault 1.4 Litre (Australia); Renault Virage (Australia); Renault 12 Toros (Turkey); Dacia 1300 (Romania)
- Production: 1969–1982 (France); 1969–1984 (Romania); 1971–1994 (Argentina); 1971–2000 (Turkey)
- Model years: 1969–1981
- Assembly: France: Boulogne-Billancourt; Argentina: Santa Isabel (IKA); Australia: Heidelberg; Belgium: Haren-Vilvoorde (RIB); Canada: Saint-Bruno-de-Montarville, Quebec (SOMA); Chile: Los Andes; Colombia: Duitama; Envigado (SOFASA); Mexico: Ciudad Sahagún; Morocco: Aïn Sebaâ (Somaca); New Zealand: Thames (Campbell Industries); Portugal: Guarda; Romania: Mioveni (Dacia); Spain: Valladolid (FASA-Renault); Turkey: Nilüfer, Bursa (Oyak-Renault); Yugoslavia: Novo Mesto (IMV); Venezuela: Mariara

Body and chassis
- Class: Small family car (C-segment); Small van
- Body style: 4-door saloon; 5-door estate; 3-door car derived van
- Layout: FF layout
- Related: Renault 15/17; Dacia 1310/1410; Ford Corcel; Ford Del Rey

Powertrain
- Engine: 1289 cc 810 I4; 1397 cc 847/C1J I4; 1565 cc C2L I4 (RA/TR); 1565 cc A2L/807-20 I4 (US/Gordini); 1596 cc 807-G I4 (Gordini); 1647 cc A2M I4 (USA)
- Transmission: 4-speed manual; 5-speed manual; 3-speed automatic

Dimensions
- Wheelbase: 2,440 mm (96.1 in)
- Length: 4,345 mm (171.1 in) (saloon); 4,410 mm (173.6 in) (estate)
- Width: 1,616 mm (63.6 in)
- Height: 1,435 mm (56.5 in) (empty)

Chronology
- Predecessor: Renault 8 and 10
- Successor: Renault 18

The Renault 12 is a small family car introduced by French automaker Renault at the Paris Motor Show in October 1969 and produced in France until 1980. Available as a saloon (Berline) and estate (Break), it was also produced under licence in many countries around the globe into the early 21st century.

In its first few years the 12 received praise from the European press for its spacious, comfortable interior, its styling, its performance and its low fuel consumption. However it fared worse in the North American press: in a test of the 1974 model, Road & Track was critical of the engine's "obtrusive" noise, and called the heavy, non-power steering "a serious design flaw". They also gave it "very poor marks" for the ventilation system.

Renault 12 production and sales ended in western Europe in 1980, but the model continued to be produced and sold by Renault affiliates elsewhere. The last R12 was produced in 2000 in Turkey, while Romanian automaker Dacia continued producing the R12-based 1310 saloon and estate until 2004 and the R12-based Dacia Pick-Up until December 2006.

Commercially the Renault 12 was a successful car, selling 2.5 million units.

== Design ==
In January 1964, the Styling Center began the design of the 117 model. This was a new model to bridge the gap between the Renault 8 and the Renault 16. The demands for Project 117 were:

"The car had to be economical, not very sophisticated. It had to have a roomy interior, and a large boot, and a small engine will suffice. The car had to be easy to produce, so it could be made all over the world. It had to be reliable for the export markets, and comfortable enough for France. It should be usable as a base for multiple variations."

=== Body ===
The Renault 12's design dates back to the genesis of the Renault 16; indeed, some initial R16 concept designs resemble the R12 more than the ultimate design of the R16. However, the R12 was technically quite different from either the R16 or the smaller Renault 4. Like all new Renaults at the time (and in common, by now, with more than 60% of the cars produced in France) the car had front wheel drive, but the R12 had a very different layout from Renault's existing front wheel drive models. The engine was placed longitudinally ahead of the front wheels, while it was behind the wheels on the R4 and R16.

At the time of its launch in October 1969 at the Paris Motor Show, the Renault 12 was only available as a 4-door saloon, in L and TL specifications. The more expensive TL featured two separate reclining front seats instead of one front bench seat, armrests on the doors, lights in the boot and glovebox, a heated rear window, and extra warning lights.

=== Engine ===
It would have been a simple matter to install the light weight engine from the Renault 16 in the Renault 12, and this was later done for some high-end versions. However Renault had successfully built European market share since 1945 by competing aggressively on price. In the closely contested 1300 cc category it was left to the new Peugeot 304 to attract customers willing to pay a premium price, while for the Renault 12, at launch, the aluminium block of the Renault 16 was rejected on cost grounds. Instead, Renault specified an enlarged version of the iron Cléon unit, used since 1962 in the Renault 8/10. The engine's size was increased to 1289 cc for use in the 12. Listed power output was 60 PS (44 kW; 59 hp) SAE (54 PS (40 kW; 53 hp) DIN) which provided for a respectable top speed of 145 km/h (90 mph).

The new version of the five-bearing engine initially fitted on the Renault 12 retained the removable cylinder liners that Renault had long favoured. It rejected the "oversquare" cylinder dimensions that had become fashionable with some European auto-makers during the 1960s. Many components, such as the oil pump and the distributor were unchanged, while others, including the cylinder head, the valve gear and the engine block itself were only minimally updated. The only completely reworked elements were the cylinder liners, the connecting rods, the pistons themselves and the crankshaft. In the 1962 version of the engine the cylinders had been unevenly spaced in two groups of two, but in this new application they were equidistant in order to allow for the cylinder diameter, here increased to 73 mm, to be combined with space for sufficient coolant to circulate around the cylinders.

The longitudinal placement of the engine, most of its mass positioned ahead of the front wheels, allowed the R12 to have a very simple design of the gear-selector that was placed on the floor of the car, and not on the dashboard as with the R4 or on the steering column as with the R16. On the early cars the handle to operate the handbrake was placed under the dashboard. The handbrake was later relocated to a position between the two front seats.

=== Suspension ===
The R12's suspension also differed from that of the R4 and R16, using a rigid (but light) rear axle as opposed to four-wheel independent suspension. The use of a rigid rear axle from a manufacturer that had championed all-round independent suspension for twenty-five years was seen by many commentators as a retrograde step.

== Later developments ==
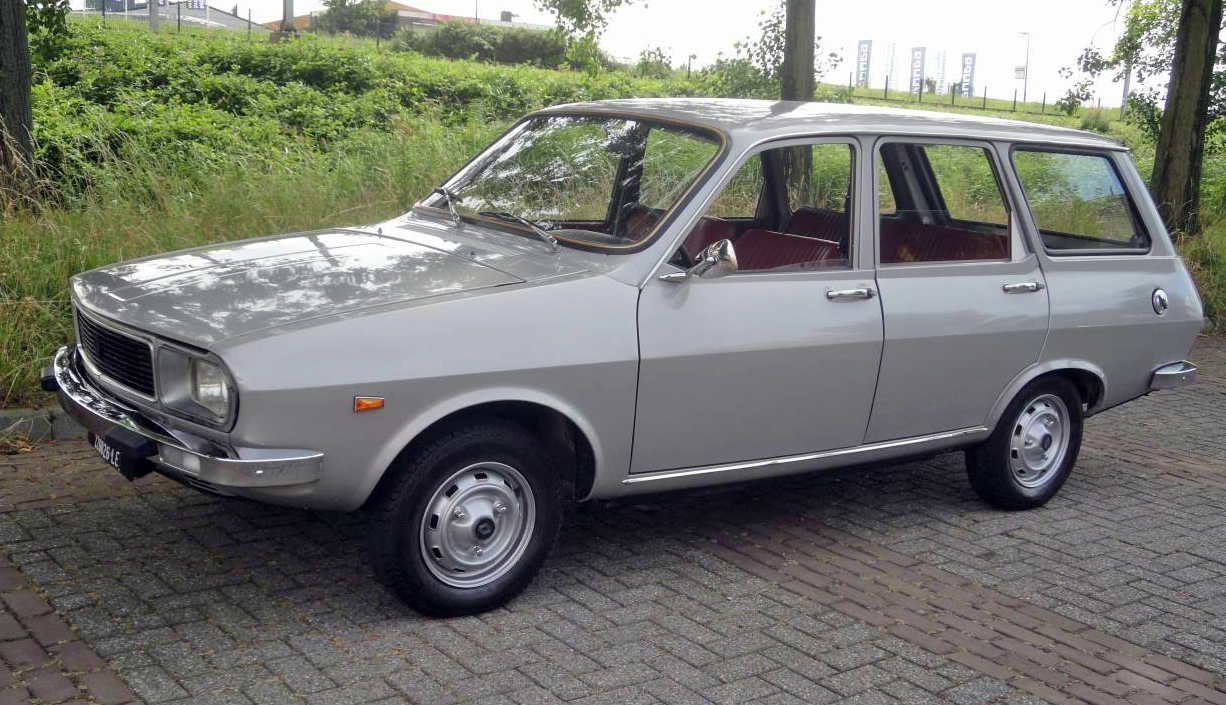
Break, post-1975 facelift

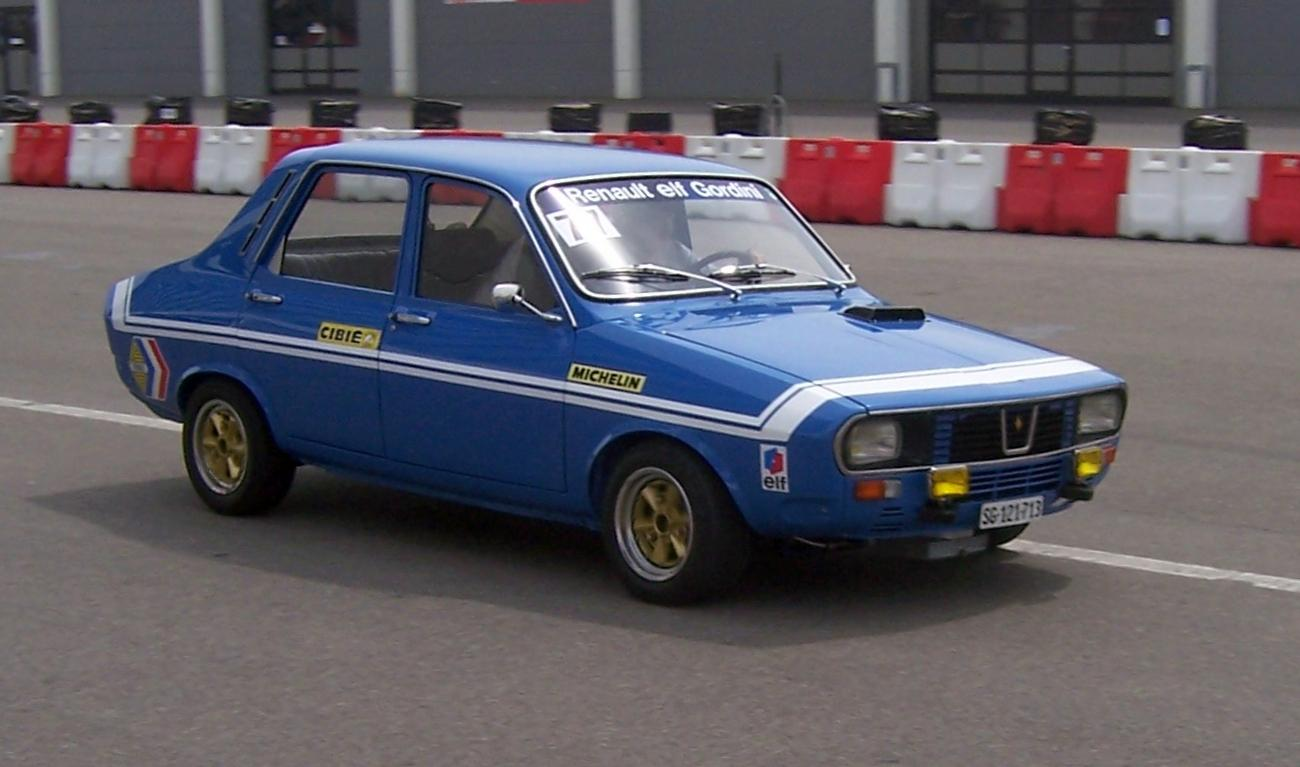
The Renault 12 Gordini

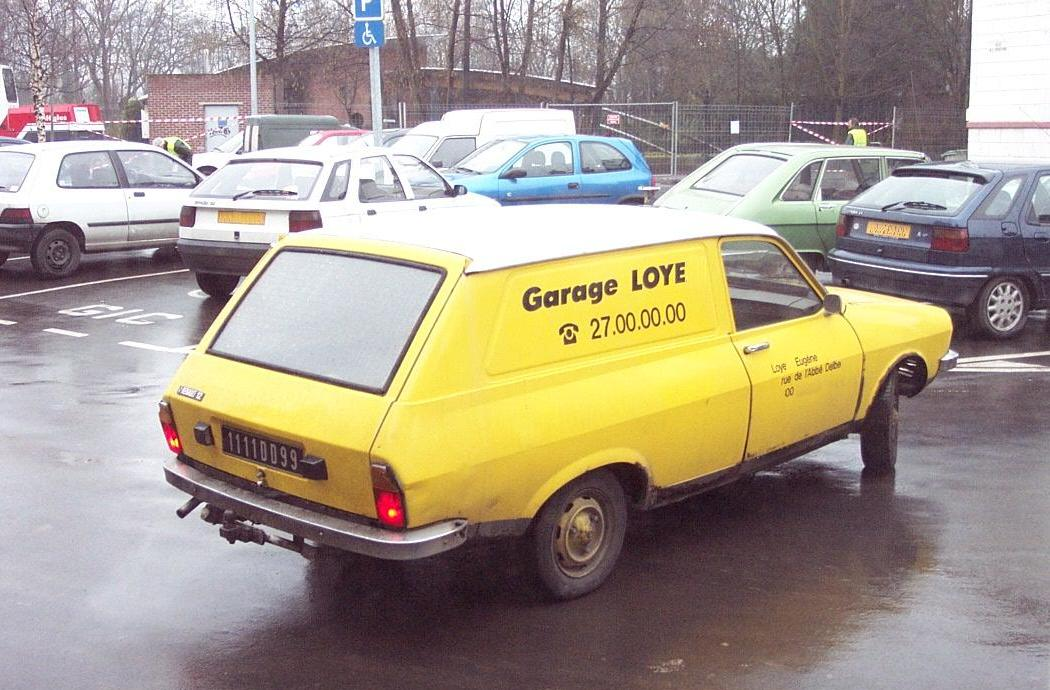
"Service" (van) version

In 1970, two new variants were introduced. The estate was launched with the same trim levels and engines as in the saloon and a high-performance Renault 12 Gordini model was introduced equipped with the all-aluminium 1565 cc block from the R16 TS fitted with two double-barrel Weber carburettors producing 113 PS (83 kW; 111 hp), a reinforced crankshaft, a five-speed gearbox, ventilated disc brakes on the front wheels and normal disc brakes on the rear wheels, as well as a tuned suspension. The Gordini was able to reach 185 km/h (115 mph) and was sold with paint schemes comprising a solid pastel colour (there were several to choose from) with double white stripes added on, the most famous combination being French Blue with stripes. 2225 Renault 12 Gordinis were sold in 1971 but after that, sales began a freefall. Renault stopped production of the Gordini in 1974 after 5188 had been sold (compared to 11,607 Renault 8 Gordinis).

In October 1972, the more upmarket R12 TS was introduced. It used the same 1289 cc engine as in other R12s, but was equipped with a single, double barrel Weber carburettor, which increased power to 64 PS (47 kW; 63 hp) and raised the top speed to 150 km/h (93 mph). Aesthetically, the car was distinguishable from other R12s by its special Gordini-style wheels, a chrome strip along the side of the car, and in some countries, two extra headlights. The TS also featured integrated headrests, a tachometer and a cooling-fluid temperature gauge. October 1972 was also when the hand brake lever was relocated from a position ahead of the driver to a floor-mounted location between the front seats. This became possible because now, even on the base "L" version of the car, after the front bench seat was replaced by two individual seats.

In October 1973, at the Paris Motor Show, the R12 TR appeared. This model slotted between the TL and TS, and had automatic transmission as standard. This three-speed, torque converter unit was developed by Renault themselves and was notable for being electronically (rather than hydraulically) controlled. It had already been available in the Renault 16 for a few years, and in the 15/17 coupés since several months earlier.

The whole range was facelifted in 1975 with a simplified grille, new rear lamps and dashboard. The Renault 12's successor, the Renault 18, was launched in 1978, but French production of the Renault 12 continued for two more years in spite of its successor's instant popularity.

== Across the world ==
The 12 was a global car, built in at least a dozen countries and marketed across all continents. It was even the basis for the GNW Duiker, a stillborn sporting convertible with a fiberglass body intended as the beginning of a Rhodesian national car project. The bankers disagreed and the plug was pulled in late 1972. A few examples seem to have been built.

=== Romania ===
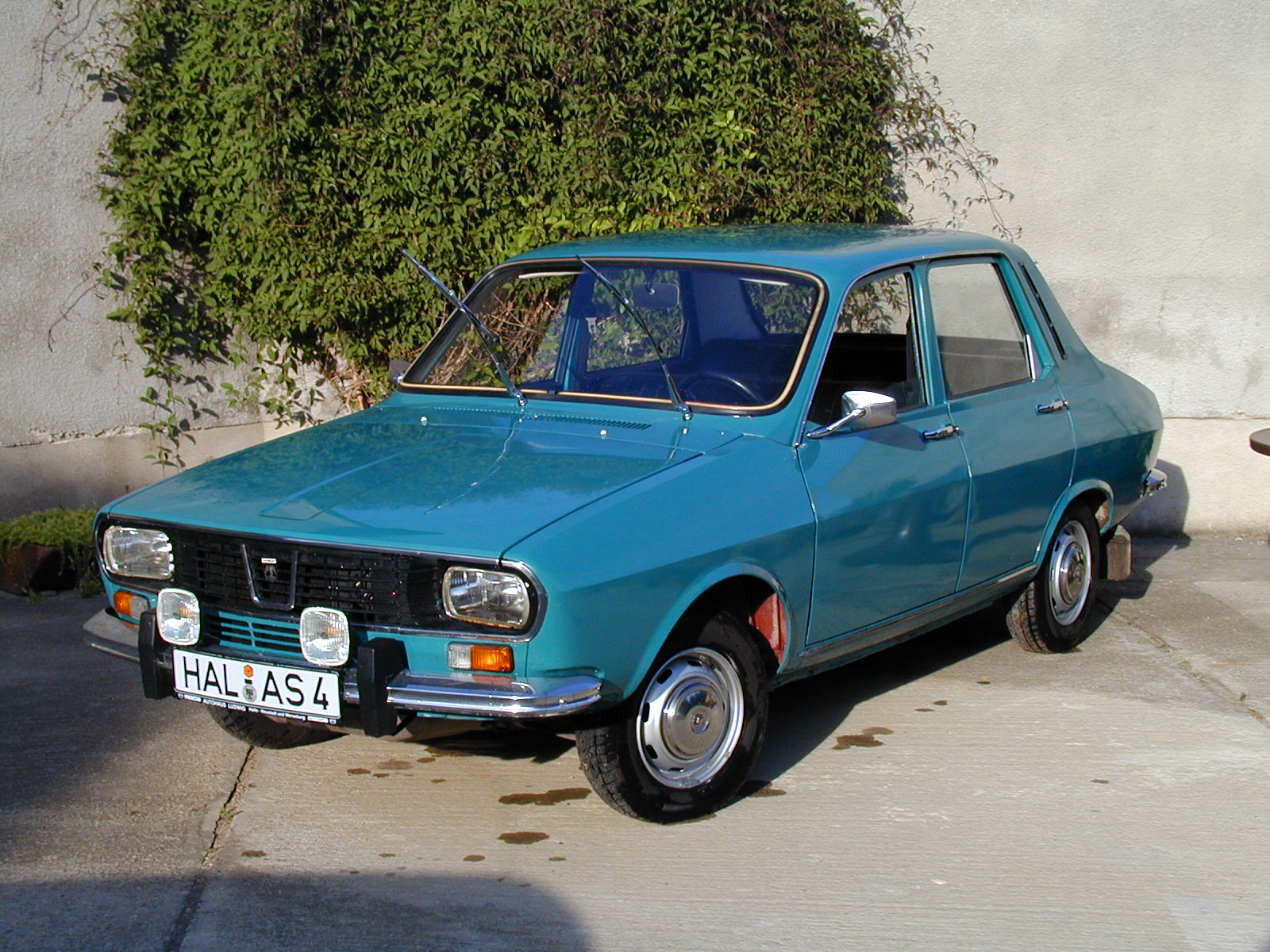
1973 Dacia 1300

Dacia acquired the tooling and basic designs of the Renault 12 and manufactured it in various body styles in Romania, as the Dacia 1300, between 1969 and 1979. Also, the successor of this car, named Dacia 1310, was based on Dacia 1300. The production of the 1310 started in 1979 and stopped in 2004.

The 35 years of production saw the manufacturing of a total of 1,959,730 vehicles plus, between 1975 and 2006, a total of 318,969 vehicles belonging to the range that came to be known under the generic name of Dacia Pick-Up.

=== Turkey ===
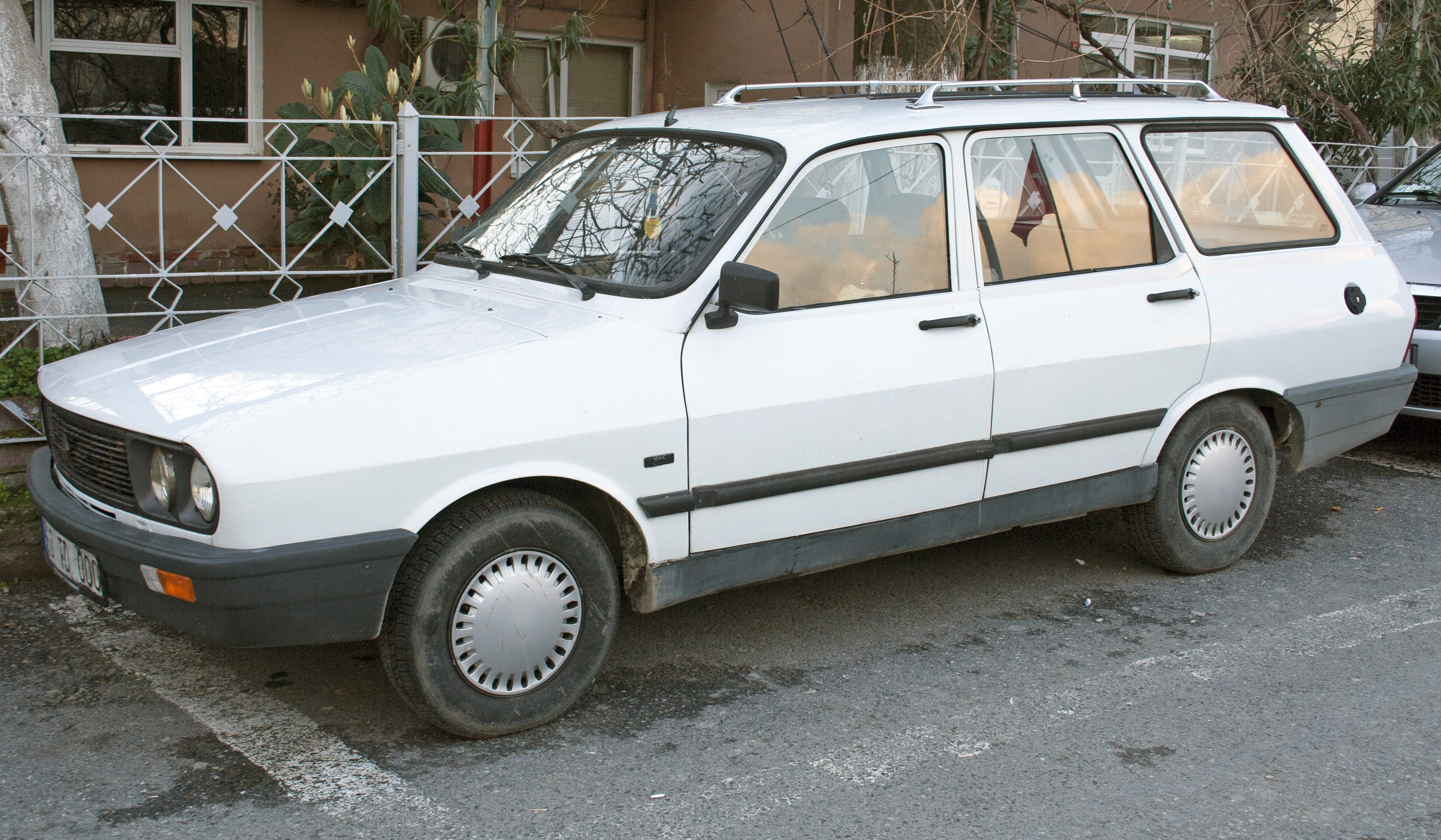
Turkish-built Renault 12TSW Toros (wagon)

A Renault 12-based car was made in Turkey by Oyak-Renault between 1971 and 2000. The earlier models were similar to the original R12, then the car underwent a facelift in 1989 and was marketed under the name Renault Toros until it was discontinued due to stricter European emissions standards coming into effect. The name "Toros" has a dual etymology: one is the Taurus Mountains (Turkish: Toros dağları), the other is the submodel designation TS. Sold as a sedan or a station wagon (TSW), it has a 1.4 litre carburetted C1J (Cléon) engine with 61.5 PS (45 kW; 61 hp) and came with either a four- or a five-speed transmission.

Renault 12 is the first Turkish-built automobile to be exported abroad and started to be exported to Lebanon in 1973. Turkish-built Renault 12s also exported to Algeria, Azerbaijan, Congo, Gabon, Ivory Coast, Mali, Mauritania, Morocco, Northern Cyprus, Niger, Senegal, Togo, Tunisia and Upper Volta.

=== Australia ===
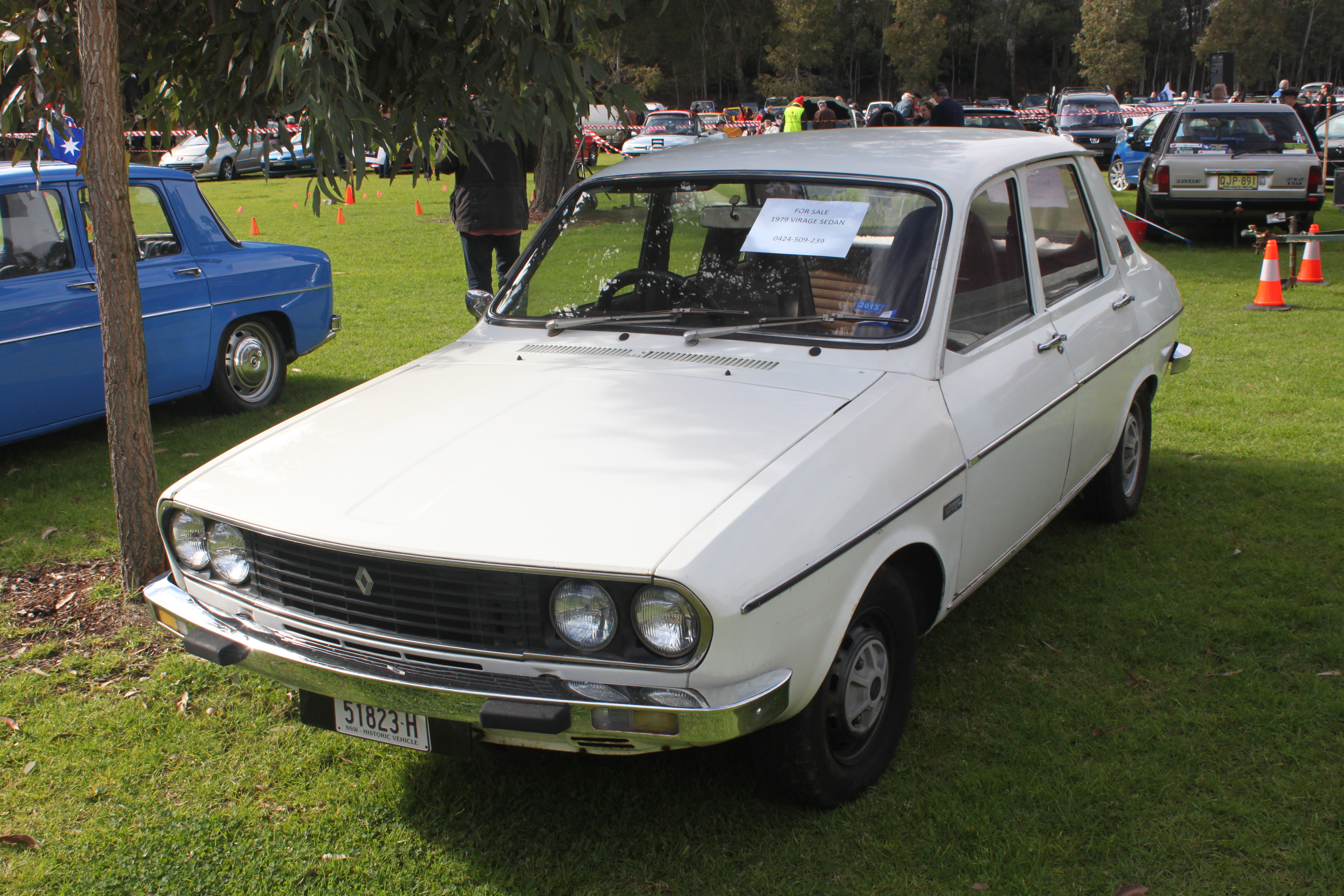
Renault Virage Sedan (Australia)

The Renault 12 won Australia's Wheels magazine's Car of the Year award in 1970. It was built at Renault Australia's assembly plant in the Melbourne suburb of Heidelberg from CKD kits. Various components such as seats were sourced locally.

The Australian range generally followed the UK models, including the facelift (which arrived in 1976) but, from about 1971, when new Australian Design Rules were introduced, had to have a special local wiper mechanism with a conventional right hand drive pattern (parking on the passenger side). This also affected locally assembled Peugeot 504 and Triumph 2.5 models. By the mid-1970s, local parts content had increased to represent about fifty percent.

In October 1976 the 1,289 cc engine was replaced by a larger capacity 1,397 cc version; the new model was marketed as the Renault 1.4 Litre, sometimes referred to simply as the "Renault 1.4". This model incorporated the same facelift introduced in France earlier in the year, with a new grille and dashboard. The 1.4 engine had hitherto been reserved for the Swedish and Canadian markets and was equipped with various emissions controls equipment, allowing it to meet the new ADR27A emissions requirements. While heavier than the 1.3-liter Renault 12XL, power also increased by about ten percent, with torque figures up 13 percent. It produced a modest 49 kW (66 hp) at 5750 rpm, with a maximum speed of 150 km/h and returned around 9 litres / 100 km in mixed driving. The Renault 1.4 saloon weighed 920 kg (2,028 lb), while the station wagon was somewhat heavier.

In May 1978 it was renamed again and became the Renault Virage. This was identical to the 12, with no changes to the engine or performance, but incorporated twin round headlamps. Production in Australia ended in 1980.

=== New Zealand ===
The Renault 12 was assembled from CKD kits at importer Campbell group's own assembly plant in Thames, New Zealand, which later became a Toyota NZ factory and is now used to recondition used cars imported from Japan. The Campbell-built 12s had about 50 percent local content (glass, upholstery, tyres, carpet, paint, radiator, battery, etc.). One trim level was available and both sedans and wagons were made.

=== Yugoslavia ===
In 1972, Renault made a strategical partnership with Yugoslav manufacturer IMV from Novo Mesto, SR Slovenia, which had earlier been producing several Austin Motor Company models, to start producing besides Renault 4, also the Renault 12, Renault 16, Renault 18 and Renault 5 for the Yugoslav market.

=== North America ===
In Canada, the Renault 12 was assembled locally by SoMA in Québec from CKD kits from 1970 until summer 1973. The first two years' production the cars had small side marker lights, rectangular Cibié headlamps and the 60 HP SAE gross 1289 cc engine with single barrel Solex carb. La Presse newspaper reported in 1970 that a few 12 Gordinis were also imported to Canada before the stricter 1972 emission controls kicked in. From then on, the Renault 12 was imported fully built-up from France, and equipped with the 1647 cc all aluminium engine and twin, 150-mm sealed beam headlights. Starting in late 1977, Canada received a 1.4-liter engine, the same as was also used in Sweden, to meet more stringent emissions standards than those used in most European markets. Power was 66.5 hp (50 kW; 67 PS) SAE Gross at 5000 rpm. The R12 sold in Canada was available in base, L, TL, or GTL versions, as well as a Station Wagon (largely equivalent to the TL trim). The L, TL, and Station Wagon were also available with the automatic transmission. In total, 25,662 Renault 12 were sold in Canada: 1477 basic models from 1973-1976; 3935 12L models between 1970 and 1976; 10,270 12 TL/GTL models between 1970 and 1976; 1731 12L Automatics between 1971 and 1976; 2004 12TL Automatics between 1971 and 1976; 4029 R12 Station Wagons between 1971 and 1976; 1300 R12 Automatic Station Wagons between 1971 and 1976; and finally only 916 R12 Nordic sedans and station wagons in 1977-1979. The foregoing data from M.C. Fertey, former head of Renault Canada Ltée does not include figures by model for 1978, but roughly 900 R12 Nordics were likely sold that year. The Canada-only "Nordic" special edition was available in 1978 and 1979, and played up the commonalities between the Canadian and Scandinavian markets. Period advertising made mention of the shared 1.4-liter engine and offering Scandinavian-market equipment such as headlight washers and Finnish-developed aluminum front inner fenders. This version was only available in Metallic Blue, with mock-wood trim on the Station Wagon model. Sales the last few years were desultory, with 654 Renault 12s sold in Canada in 1979, 225 in 1980, and a final 37 cars delivered in 1981.

The United States-market Renault 12 was presented in the Bois de Boulogne in May 1971, followed by a presentation to American Renault dealers at the Doral Country Club, near Miami, shortly thereafter. The federalized R12 originally only came as a TL sedan or a Station Wagon (the first wagon to be sold by Renault in the US), but later a plain base version and the 12 L trim lines were added. They ranged in price from the introductory US$ 2195 to US$4498 for the final Station Wagon. US models differ in their quad headlamps and side marker lights, as well as by having a bump in the bonnet to clear the larger engine and its associated emissions hardware.

The 12 was a slightly larger car than most European imports, and the longitudinal front-wheel drive layout contrasted with most. The engine, an all-aluminum 1565 cc unit with steel cylinder liners was shared with the Renault 16 and was specific to the U.S. market, although the 12 received a double-barrel Solex carburettor and slightly more power. Power was originally 73 hp (54 kW; 74 PS) SAE at 5000 rpm with a 8.6:1 compression ratio. For 1973, the engine was upgraded to the larger 1647 cc version with a single-barrel carburettor, featuring hemispherical heads, although power decreased to 69 hp (51 kW; 70 PS) at the same engine speed as emissions regulations were tightened. For 1974, the compression ratio was dropped to 7.5:1, with power slipping to 65 hp (48 kW; 66 PS). For the 1976 model year a two-barrel carburettor and a somewhat higher compression ratio meant that 72 hp (54 kW; 73 PS) were on offer, while a more luxurious GTL model topped the lineup. Sales were marginal due to the growing popularity of Japanese imports, with their growing reputation of dependability and cost effective operation. The Renault 12 was introduced late in the 1971 model year, with sales continuing through 1977.

==== Electric Vehicle Experiments ====
In the mid-1970s, NASA used Renault 12s as electric vehicle testbeds as part of a NASA spinoff program. This test was performed in collaboration with the Energy Research and Development Administration and Electric Vehicle Associates, an EV company based in Parma, Ohio. Their Renault 12 was rebranded as the EVA Metro. It would keep the original Renault drivetrain, but was powered by lead-acid battery packs sourced from golf carts. These batteries would be situated in the engine bay and trunk.

Only 12 EVA Metros would be converted. With seven being sold to the government of Manitoba, Canada, two of which would go on to be donated to universities. Five would be sold to private customers. In 2020, an EVA Metro would resurface in the US state of Georgia and be restored to running order.

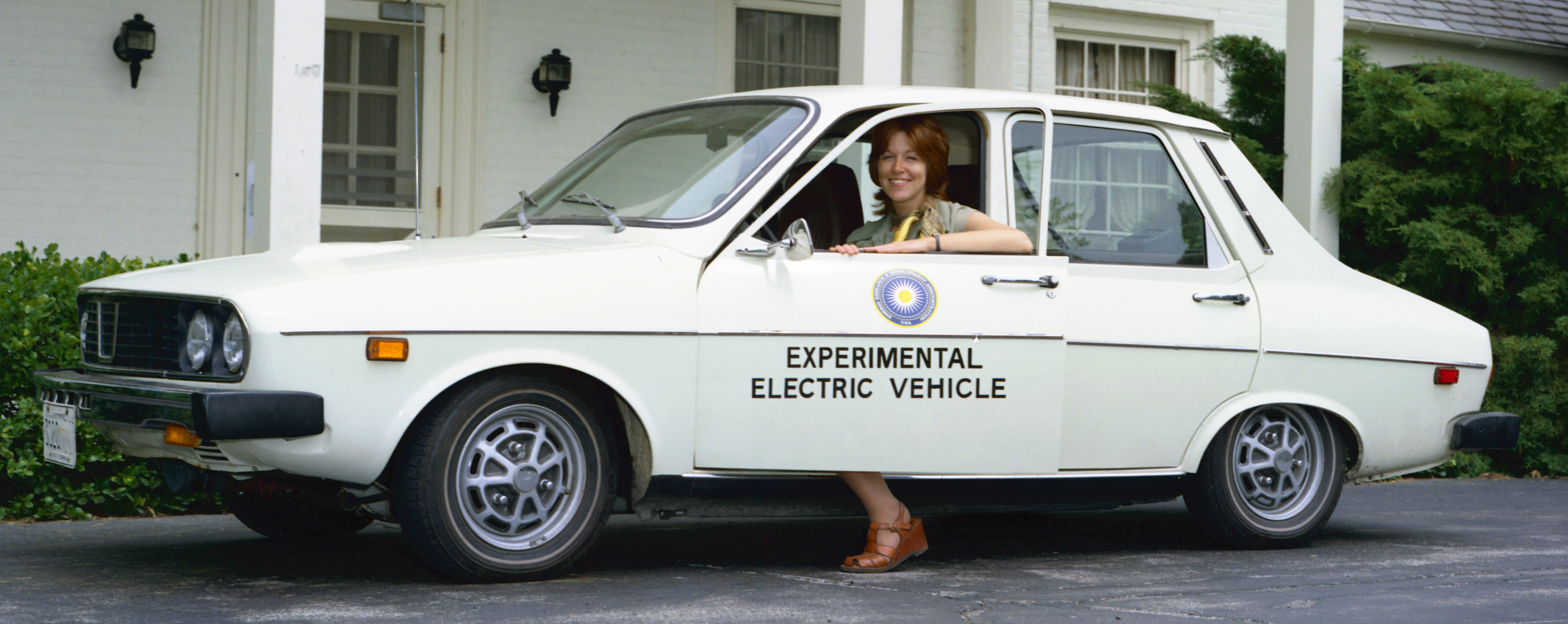
A woman in the ERDA Renault 12

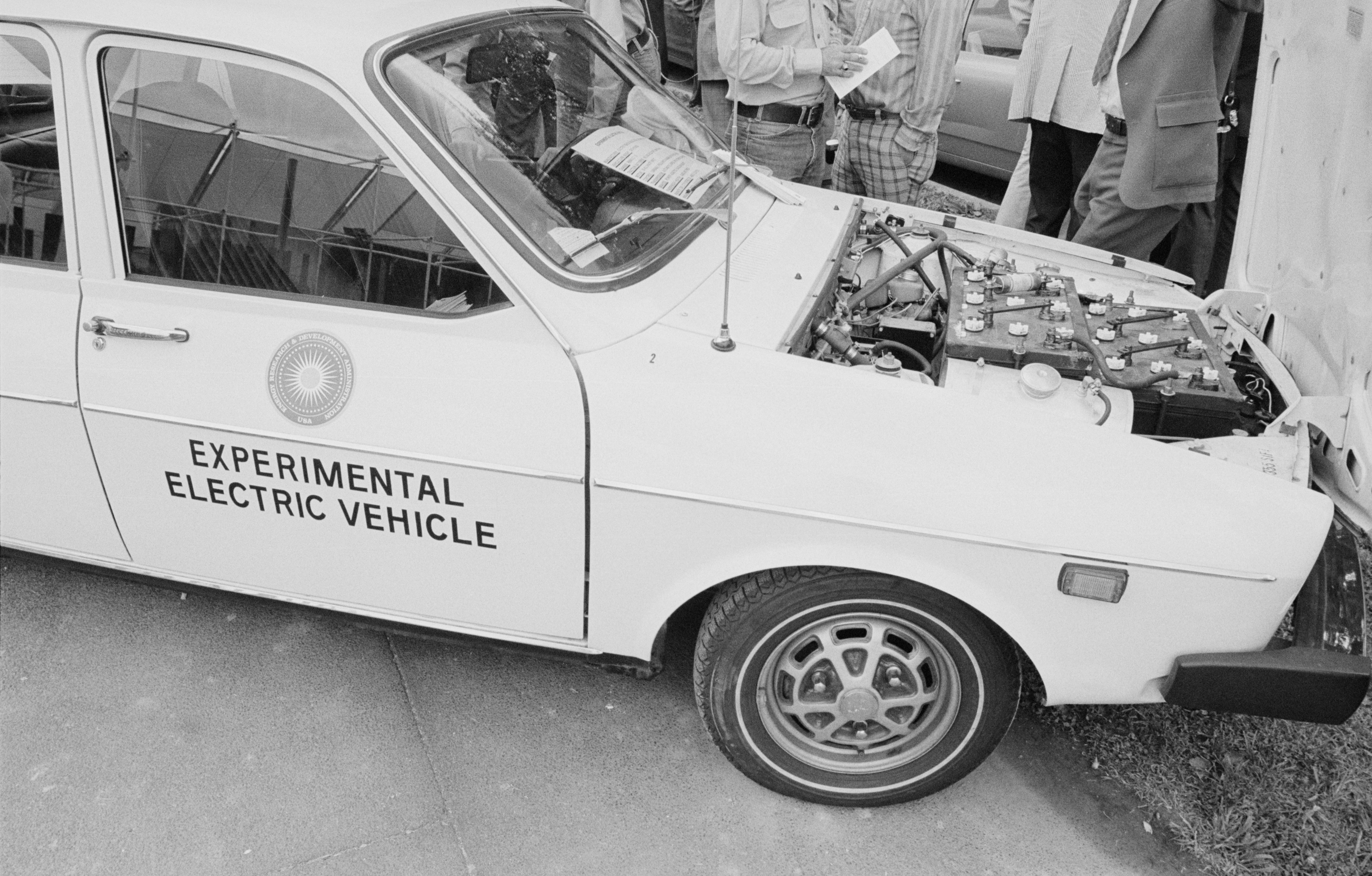
The front battery pack

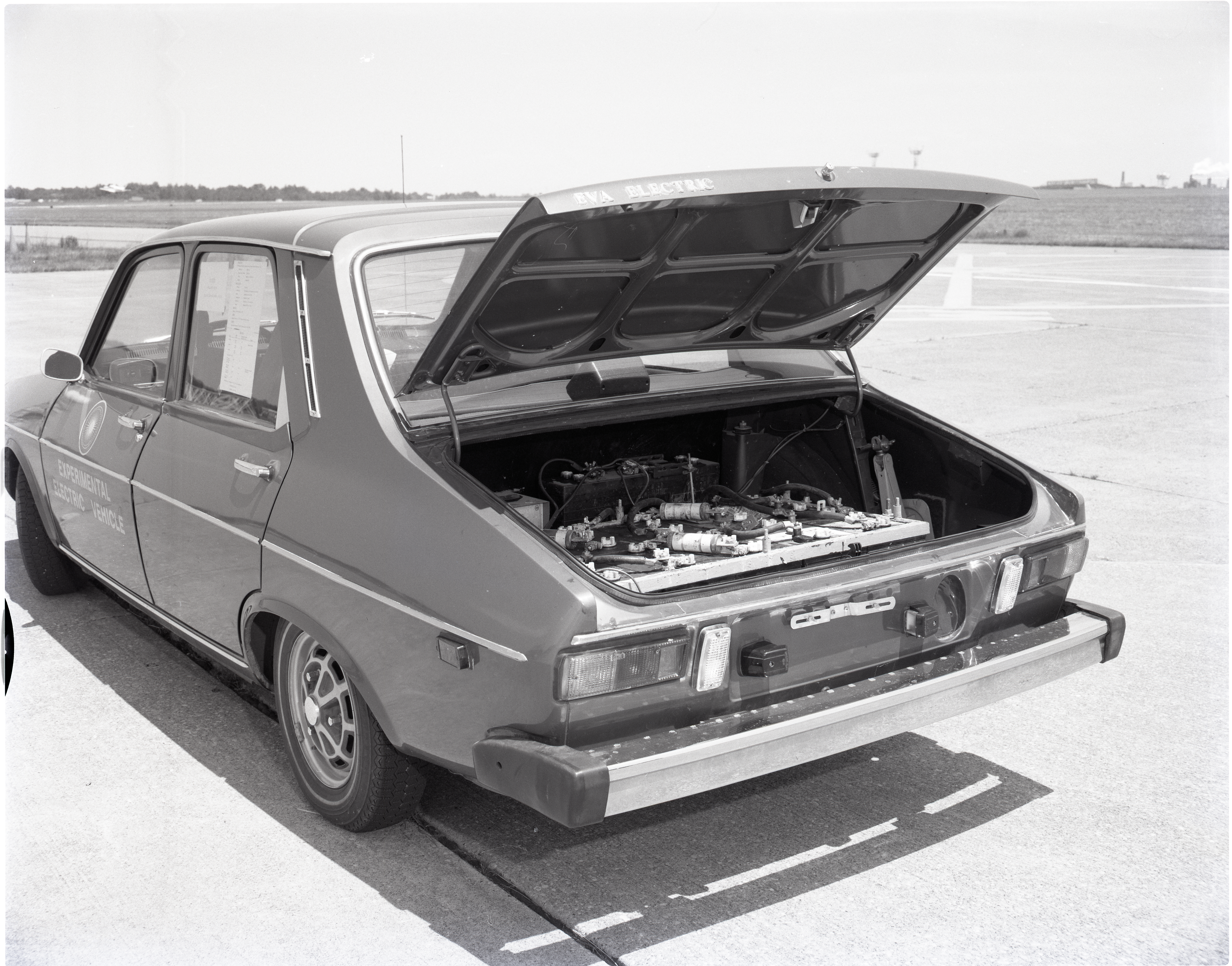
The rear battery pack

=== South America ===
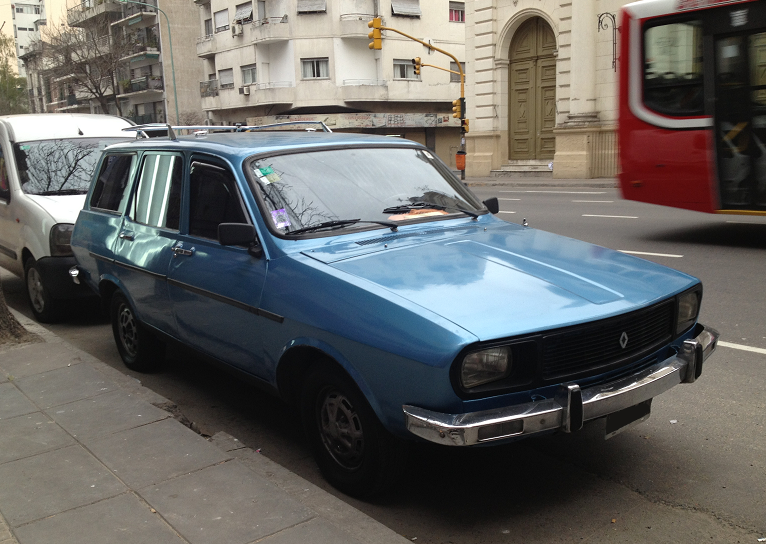
Late Renault 12 Estate in Argentina

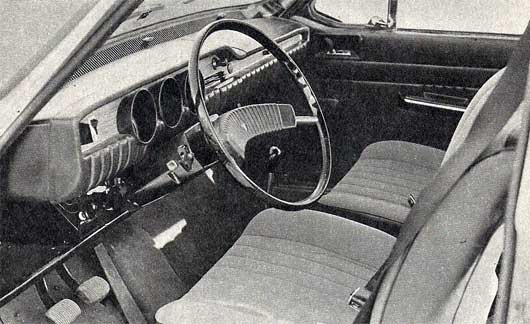
1971 Renault 12 interior (Argentina)

In Brazil, a version of the 12 was sold as the Ford Corcel and later the Ford Del Rey, when Ford do Brasil acquired the factory and rights to build the car from Willys-Overland, which had jointly developed the Brazilian version with Renault in the late 1960s. The Corcel was in fact launched in Brazil in 1968, before the Renault 12 was launched in France.

The Renault 12 was popular in Argentina and Colombia, during the 1970s and 1980s. In Colombia, this car was assembled at the plant of Renault SOFASA between 1973 and 1981, from CKDs that came from Argentina and France. In Argentina, the local versions being made at the "Santa Isabel" plant of Renault Argentina in the province of Córdoba. Production ran from November 1971 to the same month of 1994. The Break was built from 1973 to 1992; the total of both bodystyles was around 450,000 units.

Drivetrains began as 1,289 cc, switching effectively to 1,397 cc for all versions in 1977, with a last increase in bore and stroke in 1992 reaching 1,565 cc. In Brazil, Ford offered a similar 1,555 cc version with its Corcel II in 1980, which later offered an ethanol version of this engine with a 12:1 compression ratio. Gearboxes were four-speed manuals until 1988, and five-speed boxes thereafter. The R12 had a slightly higher status in this country than other places, given the fact that the Argentine Renault cars lineup was narrow at the time (R4, R6 and Renault Torino). This caused the factory to add extras such as air conditioning and quality upholstery to close the gap between this car and the Torino until the arrival of the R18 in 1982. For this same reason, virtually all of the estate models (Break) were built with the TS's mechanical and comfort features.

The Argentine Renault 12 also saw competition success in South America, with a celebrated class (up to 1,600 cc) win in the 1978 South American Marathon with Argentinian driver Jorge Recalde and co-driver Jorge Baruscotti. Recalde finished before any of the cars in the two-litre category, and Renault 12s occupied the first six positions in their category.

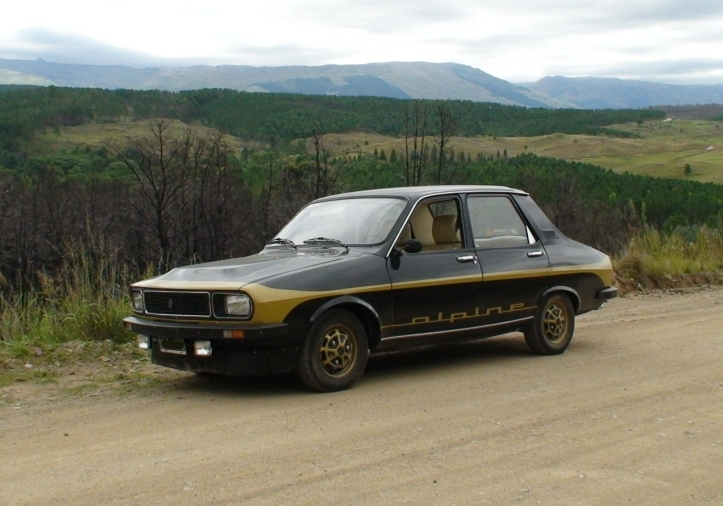
R12 Alpine

Renault 12 Alpine

The R12 Alpine was a sports version designed to improve the marque's image at local rallying. The main features were the 1397 cc engine from the R5 Alpine (built locally with imported parts), bulbous fiberglass bonnet, competition-tuned suspension, and custom paint schemes. The engine turned out 110 PS (81 kW; 108 hp), giving the Alpine a top speed of around 175 km/h (109 mph). The new suspension was also as good as the power plant, being rated at the time as "outstanding" and "Goes like on rails" (CORSA Magazine). Renault was not interested in volume production, though, and only 493 units were made between 1977 and 1980 (sold from 1978 onwards). Plus, the Alpine's hand-building process and imported parts made it cost about 40% more than the basic TL version. R12 Alpine parts were sometimes used by rallying R12 TS's, as they gave the car quite desirable characteristics but, like the R12 Alpine itself, these parts were rare.
