= Renault R15 and R17 =

Renault 15 / 17
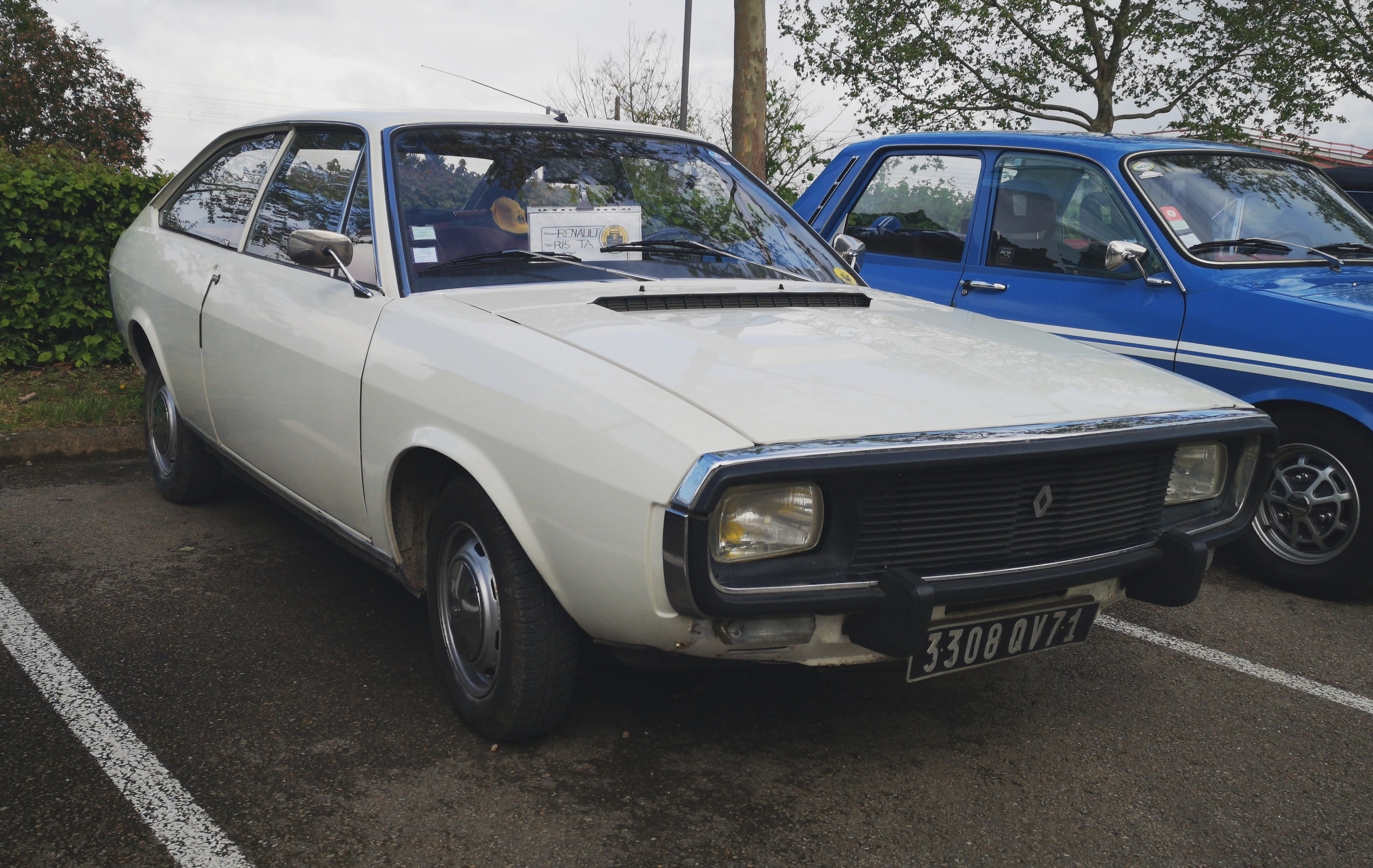
- Renault 15 TL

Overview
- Manufacturer: Renault
- Also called: R177 (Italy)
- Production: July 1971 – August 1979
- Assembly: France: Maubeuge (Chausson Maubeuge)

Body and chassis
- Class: Mid-size sports car
- Body style: 2-door fastback hatchback coupé
- Layout: Longitudinal FF layout

Powertrain
- Engine: Renault 15; 1289 cc 810 I4; 1565 cc 810 I4; Renault 17; 1565 cc 810 I4; 1605 cc 844 I4; 1647 cc 843 I4
- Transmission: 4-speed manual; 3-speed automatic

Dimensions
- Wheelbase: 2,440 mm (96.1 in)
- Length: 4,255 mm (167.5 in)
- Width: 1,640 mm (64.6 in)
- Height: 1,310 mm (51.6 in)

Chronology
- Predecessor: Renault Caravelle
- Successor: Renault Fuego

The Renault 15 and Renault 17 are two variations of the same coupé designed and built by French automaker Renault between July 1971 and August 1979. The R17 was sold as R177 in Italy, respecting the heptadecaphobia superstition.

The two were effectively coupé versions of the Renault 12. The main differences between the two cars were their headlight configuration (the 15 had two rectangular headlights whereas the 17 had four round headlights) and their rear side windows. Some markets show the 17 with the rectangular lights for TL versions.

The Renault 15 and 17 were presented at the Paris Motor Show in October 1971.

== Mechanicals ==
The chassis and most of the running gear came from the Renault 12, while the 1565 cc 108 PS (79 kW; 107 hp) A-Type engine in the more powerful R17 TS and R17 Gordini models was derived from the engine in the Renault 16 TS. Though the mechanicals of the cars were derived from other Renaults, the body was completely new. The R15 differed from the R17 in that it had the single headlights of the R12, a simpler side profile, and a smaller, 1289 cc engine in the R15 TL with 60 hp (44 kW). The R15 TS featured the same engine as the R17 TL, with 1565 cc and 90 PS (66 kW; 89 hp). The R15 did not offer a folding roof and the rear side window was not split - although it could be opened. The R17 had two rear side windows: the front one was retractable, while the rear one was hidden behind a louvre grille and folded inward.

== Chronology ==
At the 1974 Paris Motor Show, the Renault 17TS was renamed the "17 Gordini". This new name was an attempt to fill the gap left by the recently discontinued Renault 12 Gordini, nothing was changed beyond the badging. At the same time, the TS and Automatic models received a slightly larger engine with a displacement of 1605 cc.

There was a minor facelift during March 1976, most noticeable on the grille of the 15, where the chrome edge surround was replaced with a body-coloured one: the headlights were enlarged and brought forward to a position approximately flush with the surround. The grille of the 17 also lost its chrome surround, although on both cars the partially chrome front bumper now curved up at the edges to roughly half-way up the height of the grille. At the same time, the TS version received a new 1647 cc engine, similar to that of the R16 TX, and – an apparent retrograde step – equipped with twin carburetors rather than fuel injection, producing 98 PS (72 kW; 97 hp). These achieved a top speed of approximately 175 km/h (109 mph). In addition to the manually shifted TS five-speed transmission with a center shift lever, a three-speed automatic transmission was also available.

The R15 and R17 were manufactured at the Société des Usines Chausson plant in Maubeuge. Final assembly and painting for the first series took place at the Renault plant in Sandouville from 1971 to 1975. The two remained in production until August 1979; both models were replaced by the Renault Fuego which was presented in March 1980. During the entire production period, a total of 209,887 Renault 15s and 94,969 Renault 17s were manufactured. Due to corrosion and wear, most examples have since disappeared from the streets.

In 2024 Renault presented a prototype electrified restomod R17 in a collaboration with Ora-Ïto.

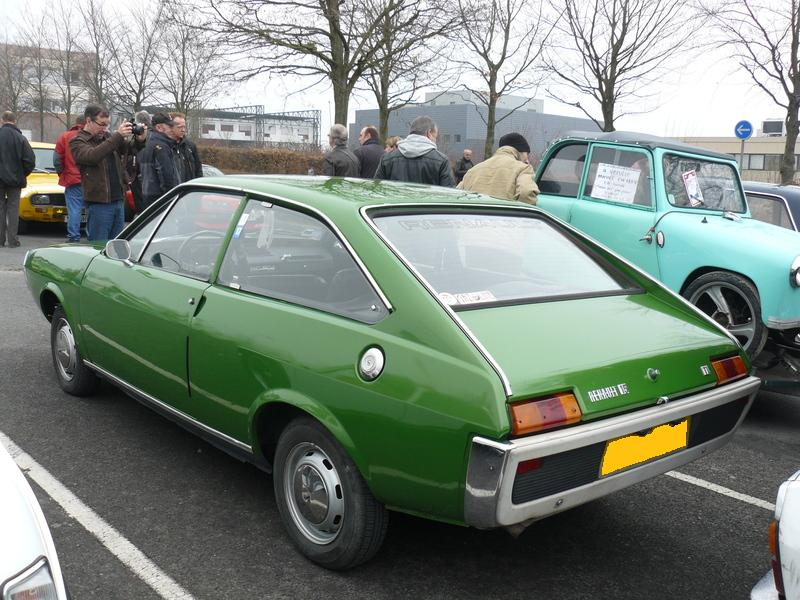
Renault 15 (1971–1976)

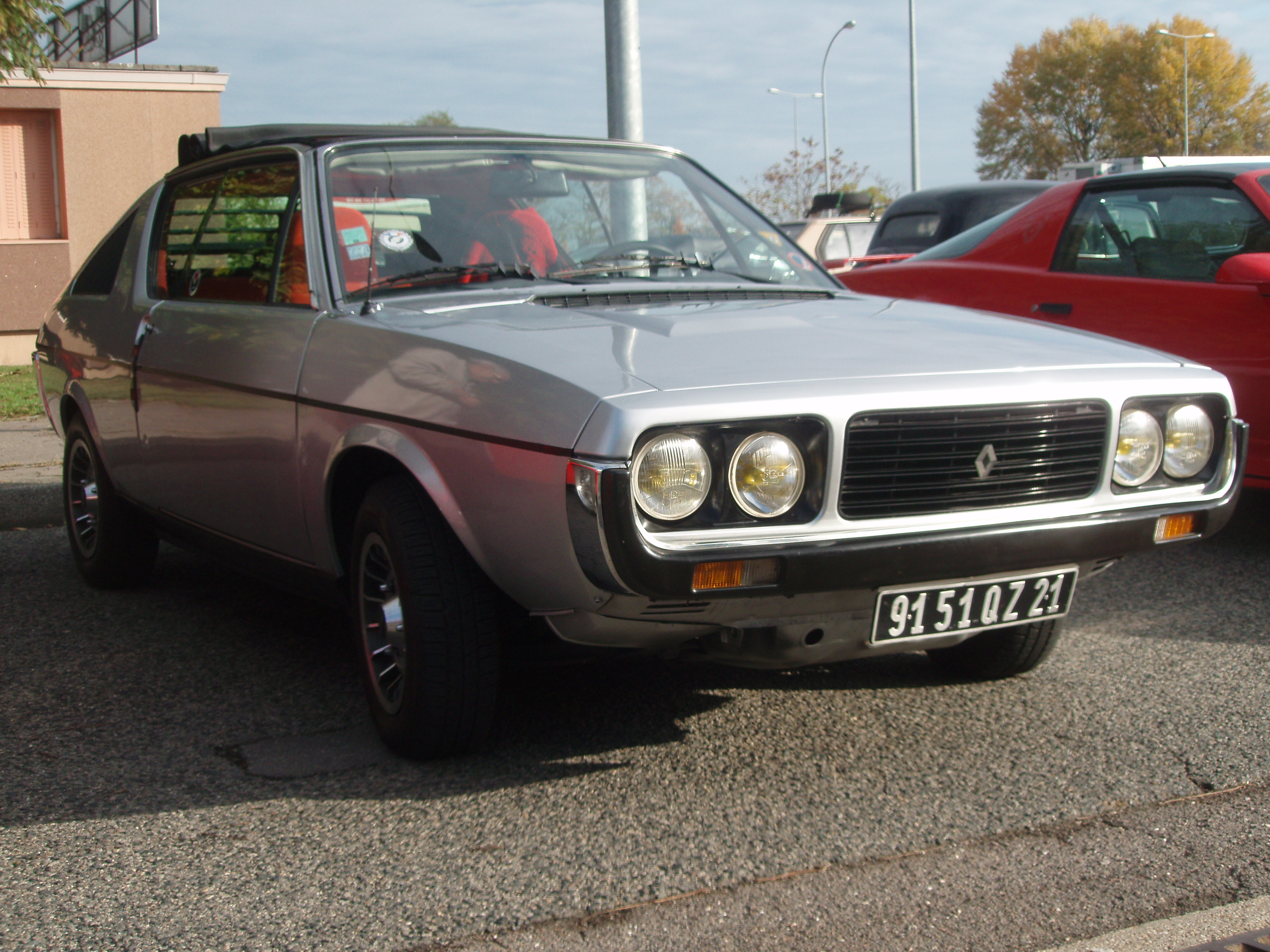
Renault 17 coupé (1976–1979)

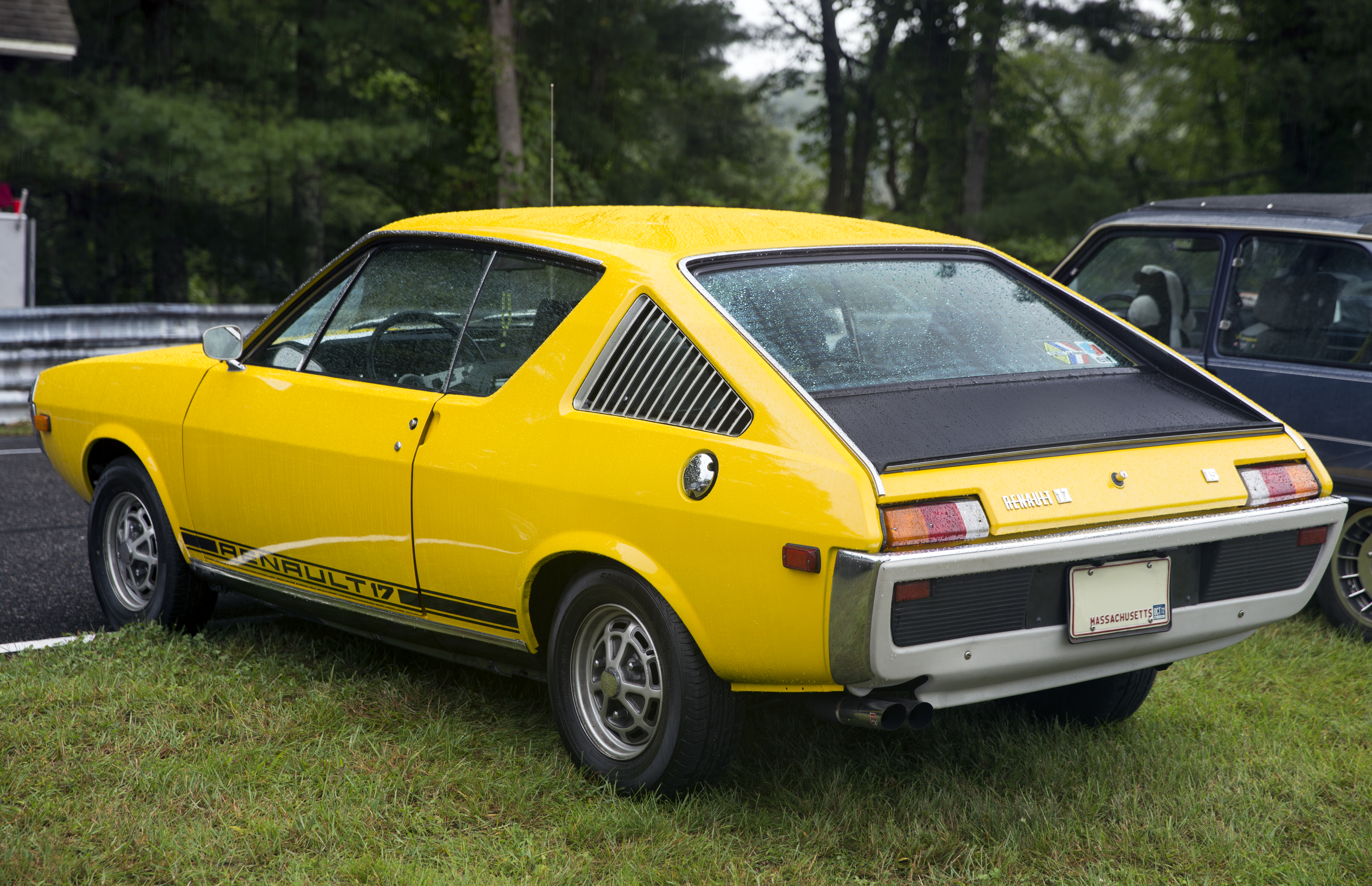
1972 Renault 17 (US version)

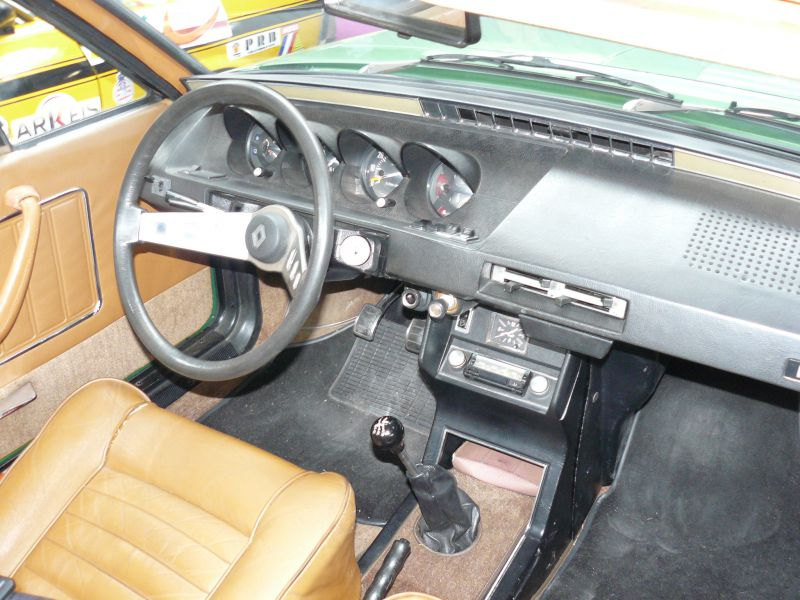
View of the cockpit and dashboard

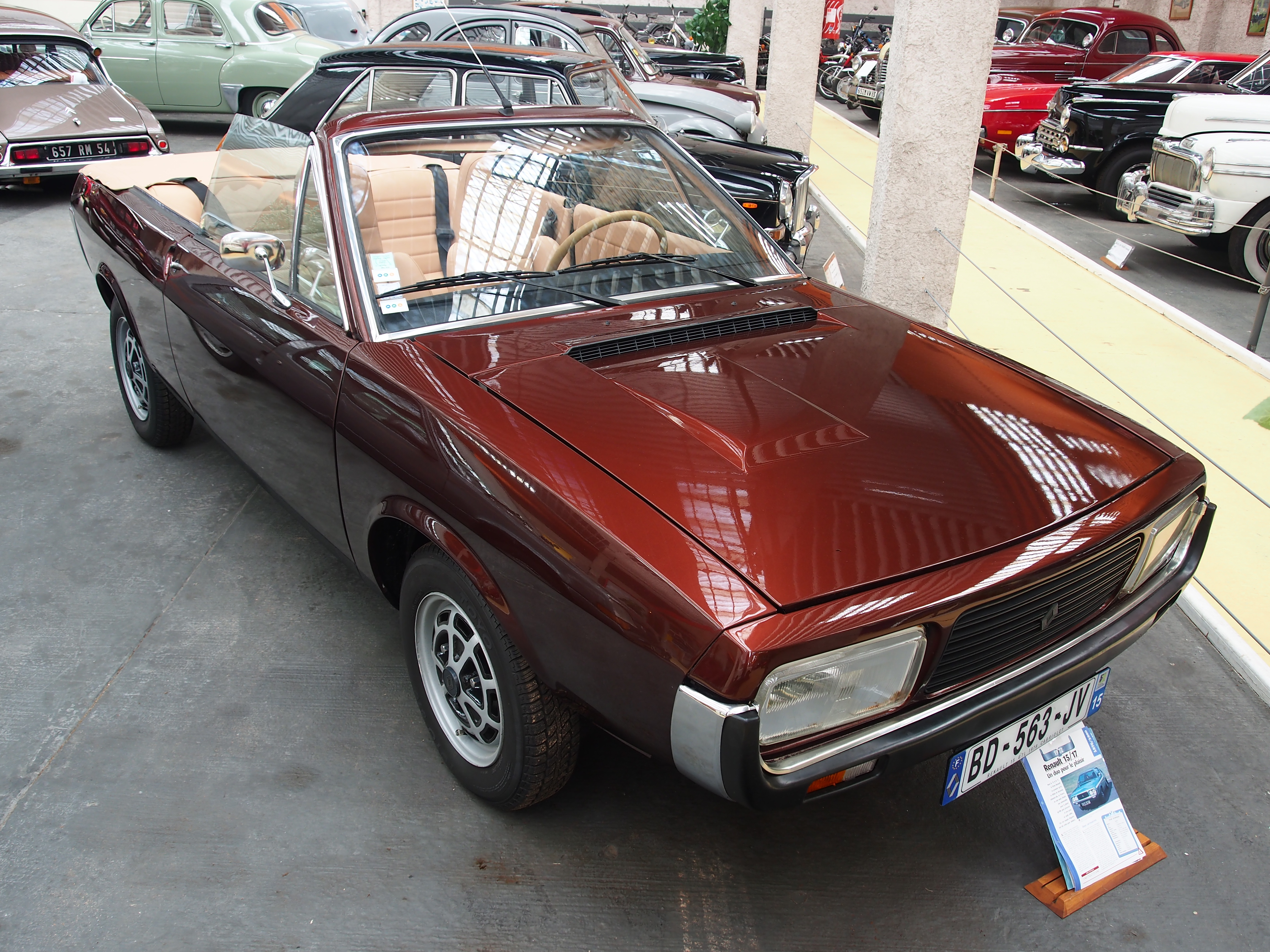
1972 Renault 15-17 Cabriolet

== Performance tested ==
The British Autocar magazine tested a 1,289 cc (78.7 cu in) Renault 15 TL in November 1972, shortly after the model's UK debut. The top speed of 94 mph (151 km/h) and the 0-60 mph (97 km/h) time of 13.6 seconds put the car near the bottom of the list of competitor vehicles selected for comparison, but overall fuel consumption for the test was class leading at 31.8 mpg_{‑imp} (8.9 L/100 km; 26.5 mpg_{‑US}). The manufacturers' recommended retail price of £1,370 was slightly lower than the UK sticker price on a comparable Vauxhall Firenza Sport and Fiat 128 Coupé 1300: Ford's Capri 1300L at £1,123 massively undercut comparable cars in the UK at the time. The test concluded by pointing out that for buyers needing more power, more powerful Renault 15 and 17 variants were available, and that power apart, the 15 TL provided "a combination of attractive styling and careful development, excellent comfort and a high level of equipment and safety".

== Global markets ==
=== Australia ===
The range was gradually introduced in Australia from May 1973. The 15TS and 17TL were initially available with the 17TS being promised later in the year. These 1973 model year vehicles contained several unique features, the stick-on mirror and sun visors from the Renault 12 to comply with regulations ("ADR"). The sun visor retaining catch on these models was never used and available only in Australia. The instrument panel "verandah" was fitted to reduce glare and was only fitted to Australian, North American and Scandinavian versions. Sales of these early models was slow in Australia due to their relatively high price, and the 17TL was discontinued there in late 1974.

In August 1974 the 17TS (R1317 with 1605 cc) finally made it to Australia, along with the European 1974 model year 15TS and 17TL with the later type dashboard. In early 1975 the 17TS was replaced by the 17 Gordini. Available later were the 15TS and 17TL with Gordini front suspension, inertia reel seat belts, tinted windows, tombstone seats and evaporative emission control as required by ADR. This was identified by the carbon canister under the bonnet, and hinged fuel filler door in the LBR quarter panel. In 1976 a final shipment of 1975 model year 17s was made and stock piled prior to the introduction of ADR 27A emission controls, these vehicles, again due to their high price, sold slowly through until 1978.

=== United States ===
The 17 was also marketed in the United States, off and on until the end of production in 1979, although it only ever sold in small numbers. For many years, it was Renault's only offering there aside from the Le Car. Later 17 Gordini models were available only with a five-speed manual, the sliding roof, and the 1647 cc engine with 95 hp (71 kW) at 6250 rpm.

== Motorsport ==
Renault abandoned plans to contest the World Rally Championship which it won in 1973. Instead, the factory developed a high-performance version of the 17 coupé at the Alpine Competition Factory which used many A110 components to compete in "selected" European events. The Gordini-developed engine had two twin-choke Webers, a hot cam, 11.5 compression ratio, big valves and tuned extractor exhaust system. The body was very light, featuring fibreglass doors, boot and bonnet panels, with plastic windows and a stripped interior. The factory said the car's weight was lowered by more than 25 percent.

Its most famous outing was the 1974 "Press-on-Regardless" WRC, held in Michigan. The Rally was the US section of the World Rally Championship. The car that won the rally was a Renault 17 Gordini driven by Jean-Luc Thérier and Christian Delferier, with a similar car coming third.

=== WRC victories ===
| No. | Event | Season | Driver | Co-driver | Car |
|---|---|---|---|---|---|
| 1 | (United States) 26th Press-on-Regardless Rally | 1974 | (France) Jean-Luc Thérier | (France) Christian Delferier | Renault 17 Gordini |

== Timeline ==
- October 1971: Introduction of the Renault 15 and Renault 17 two-door coupés. The R15 TL had the 1289 cc engine from the Renault 12, rated at 60 PS (44 kW), whereas the R15 TS, R17 TL and R17 TS all had the 1565 cc from the Renault 16 TS - rated at 90 PS (66 kW) for the R15 TS and R17 TL, and at 108 PS (79 kW) for the fuel injected R17 TS. The R15 TL, R15 TS and R17 TL all had a 4-speed gearbox whereas the R17 TS had a 5-speed gearbox.
- 1973: Fabric sunroof available on R17 TL and TS.
- 1974: R17 TS engine upgraded to 1605 cc.
  - In late 1974, for the 1975 model year, the R17 TS is renamed R17 Gordini without any technical differences
- March 1976: New R15 and R17 ranges introduced as follows: R15 TL, R15 GTL, R17 TS and R17 Gordini. The R15 TL/GTL were mechanically identical to the earlier R15 TL, while the R17 TS and Gordini had the 1647 cc engine from the Renault 16 TX.
- 1979: R15/17 production ends.

== Versions ==
| | Renault 15 TL (1971-1979) | Renault 15 TS (1971–1976) | Renault 17 TL (1971–1976) | Renault 17 TS (1971–1975) | Renault 17 TS (1976–1979) | Renault 17 Gordini (1974–1977) |
|---|---|---|---|---|---|---|
| Model code^{1} | R1300 | R1302 | R1312 | R1313 | R1314 | R1317 |
| Engine | 4-cylinder in-line engine (four-stroke) | | | | | |
| Engine | Type 810-10 (from 1976: 810-06) | Type 807-10 | | Type 807-12 | Type 843 E7-05 | Type 844-12 |
| Displacement | 1289 cc | 1565 cc | | | 1647 cc | 1605 cc |
| Bore × Stroke | 73 × 77 mm | 77 × 84 mm | | | 79 × 84 mm | 78 × 84 mm |
| Power in kW/hp | 60 PS (44 kW; 59 hp) at 5500 rpm | 90 PS (66 kW; 89 hp) at 5800 rpm | | 108 PS (79 kW; 107 hp) at 6000 rpm | 98 PS (72 kW; 97 hp) at 5750 rpm | 108 PS (79 kW; 107 hp) at 6000 rpm |
| Torque in Nm/lb⋅ft | 96 N⋅m (71 lb⋅ft) at 3500 rpm | 122 N⋅m (90 lb⋅ft) at 3000 rpm | | 134 N⋅m (99 lb⋅ft) at 5500 rpm | 133 N⋅m (98 lb⋅ft) at 3500 rpm | 136 N⋅m (100 lb⋅ft) at 5500 rpm |
| Mixture preparation | Register carburetor Weber 32DIR | | | Fuel injection Bosch D-Jetronic | Register carburetor Weber 32DARA | Fuel injection Bosch D-Jetronic |
| Cooling | Water cooling | | | | | |
| Transmission | 4-speed transmission, center shift 3-speed automatic transmission, center shift | | | 5-speed transmission, center shift | 5-speed transmission, center shift 3-speed automatic transmission, center shift | 5-speed transmission, center shift |
| Brakes | Front axle: disc brakes Rear axle: drum brakes | | | Front axle/rear axle: disc brakes | Front axle: disc brakes Rear axle: drum brakes | Front axle/rear axle: disc brakes |
| Track width front/rear | 1341/1313 mm | | | 1341/1341 mm | 1341/1313 mm | 1341/1341 mm |
| Wheelbase | 2440 mm | | | | | |
| Dimensions | 4259 × 1645 × 1307 mm | | | | | |
| Curb weight | 965 kg | 1015 kg | 1015 kg | 1050 kg | 1040 kg | 1055 kg |
| Top speed | 150 km/h (93 mph) | 169 km/h (105 mph) | | 180 km/h (112 mph) | 175 km/h (109 mph) | 180 km/h (112 mph) |
| Acceleration 0–100 km/h | 16.3 s | 10.5 s | | 9.8 s | | 9.8 s |

^{1} R17 model code is for coupé; the open roof version has the same code with a 2 as third digit.

== See also ==
- Renault R17 Electric Restomod x Ora Ïto
