= Renault Cléon-Alu engine =

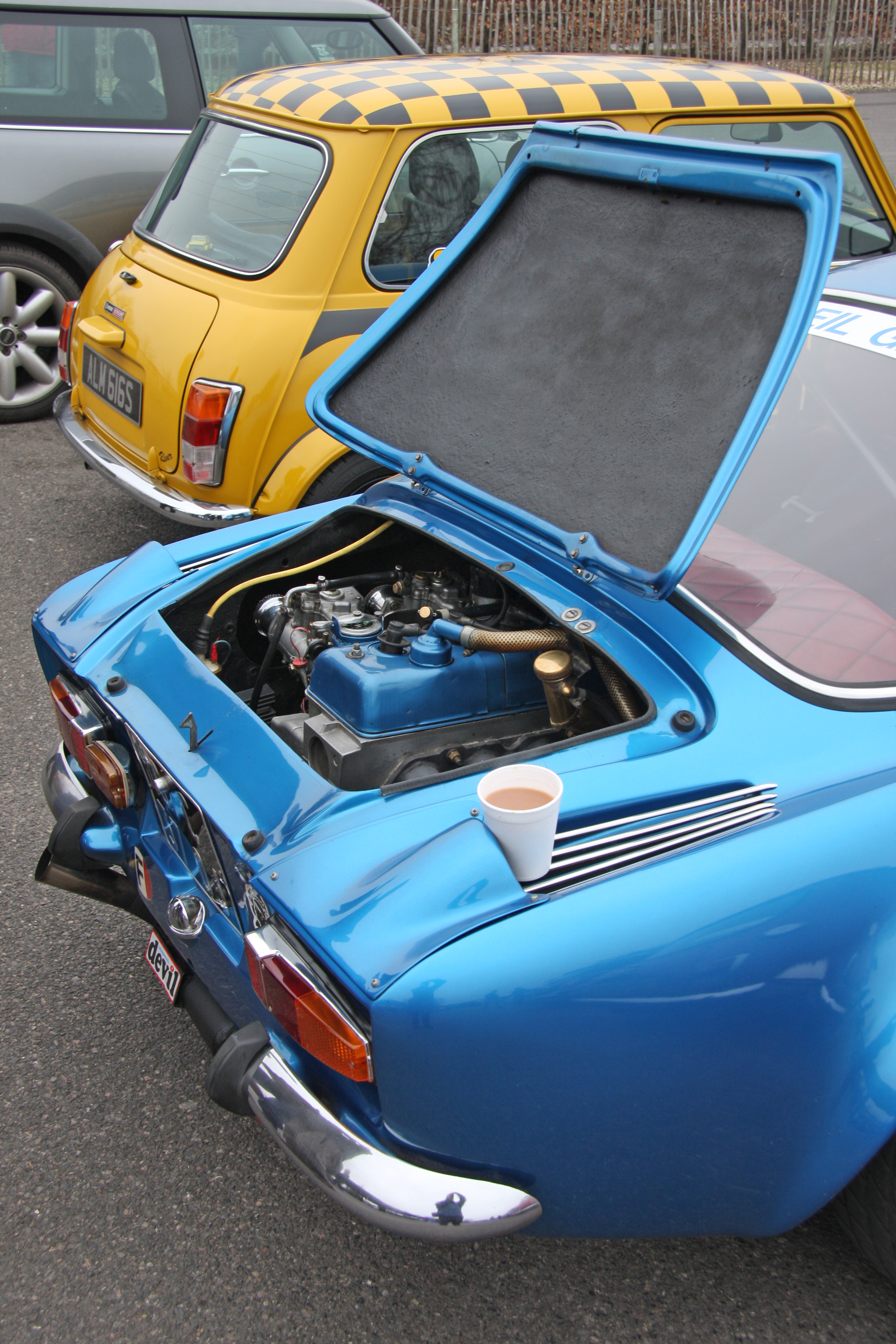

Overview
- Manufacturer: Renault
- Production: 1960–1986?

Layout
- Configuration: Inline 4
- Displacement: 1.5 L (1,470 cc); 1.6 L (1,565 cc); 1.6 L (1,596 cc); 1.6 L (1,605 cc); 1.6 L (1,647 cc)
- Cylinder bore: 76 mm (2.99 in); 77 mm (3.03 in); 77.8 mm (3.06 in); 78 mm (3.07 in); 79 mm (3.11 in)
- Piston stroke: 81 mm (3.19 in); 84 mm (3.31 in)
- Cylinder block material: Aluminium alloy
- Cylinder head material: Aluminium alloy
- Valvetrain: OHV 2 valves x cyl.

Combustion
- Turbocharger: In some sports versions
- Fuel system: Carburetor; Fuel injection
- Fuel type: Gasoline
- Cooling system: Water cooled

Chronology
- Successor: Renault F-Type engine

The Cléon-Alu engine, also known under the code "A engine" or "A-Type" (A for aluminium) is an automotive gasoline internal combustion engine, developed and produced by Renault in 1960. A four-stroke inline four-cylinder design with aluminium-alloy block and cylinder head, it was water cooled, with a five main bearing crankshaft and a side-mounted chain-driven camshaft operating eight overhead valves via pushrods and rockers. It made its debut appearance on the Renault 16.

== AxK ==
The AxK displaces 1.5 L (1,470 cc) from a bore and stroke of 76 mm × 81 mm (2.99 in × 3.19 in). Applications:

- A1K 1.5 L (1,470 cc)
  - Renault 16
  - 1967–1970 Lotus Europa S1 and S2 (types 46 and 54)

== AxL ==
The AxL displaces 1.6 L, from either 1.6 L (1,565 cc), 1.6 L (1,596 cc), or 1.6 L (1,605 cc). All of these variants share an 84 mm (3.31 in) stroke, with bores of 77, 77.8 or 78 mm (3.03, 3.06 or 3.07 in). The original engine numbers are type 807/821/851 for the smallest engine, 807-G for the 1596-cc Gordini engine, and type 844 for the largest version.

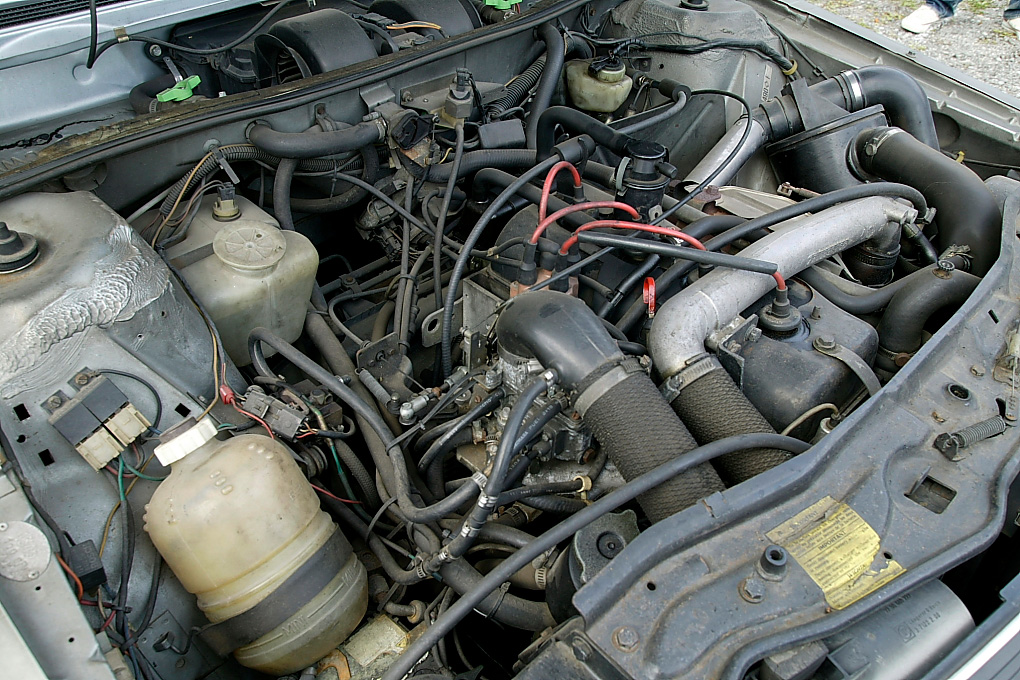
The turbocharged A5L engine in a Renault 18

Applications:

- A2L 1.6 L (1,565 cc)
  - 1968–1980 Renault 16
  - 1971–1976 Renault 15 TS
  - 1972–1976 Renault 17 TL
  - 1970–1973 Renault 12 Gordini
  - 1972–1974 Renault 12 Gordini 1.6 L (1,596 cc)
  - 1973–1975 Alpine A110 1600 S 1.6 L (1,605 cc)
  - 1971–1974 Alpine A310 1600 VE 1.6 L (1,605 cc)
  - 1969–1970 Lotus Europa S2 Federal (type 65)
- A5L 1.6 L (1,565 cc) Turbo
  - –1984 Renault 18 Turbo
  - 1983–1985 Renault Fuego Turbo
- A7L 1.6 L (1,605 cc)
  - 1985– Renault R18
- A7L 1.6 L (1,565 cc)
  - –1984 Renault 18 Turbo

== AxM ==
The AxM displaces 1.6 L (1,647 cc) from a bore and stroke of 79 mm × 84 mm (3.11 in × 3.31 in). It was originally known as the type 841 or 843, depending on output. Often used as a designator for the Renault R17 Gordini sub-model in the USA market 843/13. 82 hp (61 kW; 83 PS), Compression Ratio 9.25:1 with Bosch L-Jetronic Fuel Injection and standard distributor with points/condenser for timing.

- A1M
  - 1981–1986 Renault Trafic
- A2M / 841
  - –1984 Renault 18
  - 1985–1986 Renault 18
  - 1982–1985 Renault Fuego GTL
- A6M / 843
  - 1975–1976 Alpine A310
  - –1984 Renault 18
  - 1975–1980 Renault 16 TL
  - 1975–1981 Renault 20 L/TL/GTL
  - 1985–1986 Renault 18
  - 1980–1985 Renault Fuego TS/GTS
