= Alpine A310 =

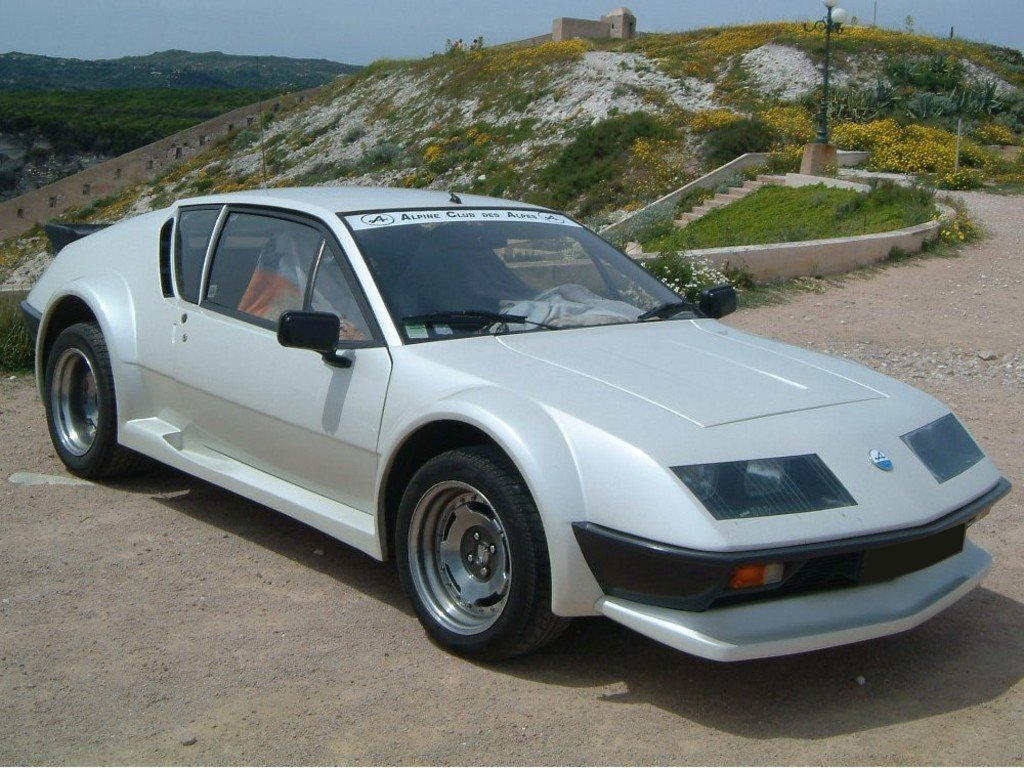

Overview
- Manufacturer: Alpine
- Production: 1971–1984
- Assembly: Dieppe, France
- Designer: Michel Beligond, Yves Legal, Trevor Fiore; Robert Opron, Peter Stevens (restyling)

Body and chassis
- Class: Sports car
- Body style: 2-door Coupé
- Layout: RR layout

Powertrain
- Engine: 1605 cc A2L/A3L I4 (1600 VE/VF); 1647 cc A6M I4 (1600 VG); 2664 cc PRV V6
- Transmission: 5-speed manual

Dimensions
- Wheelbase: 2,270 mm (89.4 in)
- Length: 4,180 mm (164.6 in)
- Width: 1,640 mm (64.6 in)
- Height: 1,150 mm (45.3 in)

Chronology
- Predecessor: Alpine A110
- Successor: Renault Alpine GTA/A610

The Alpine A310 is a sports car built by French manufacturer Alpine from 1971 to 1984. It was the last Alpine model conceived by founder Jean Rédélé.

== History ==
Dieppe-based Alpine was an independent company founded in 1955 that specialised in competition cars and sporting road cars, employing largely Renault components. They established a fine competition history with the Alpine A110 winning the 1973 Monte Carlo Rally and World Rally Championship. The A110 was recognised as being too focused to sell in volume as a grand tourer. Rédélé sought a second model with wider appeal that could compete with the Porsche 911. Although Gordini and Renault were working on V8 and V6 engines, the Alpine A310 was initially powered by a rear mounted tuned 17TS/Gordini four-cylinder engine. The maximum power was 127 PS (93 kW; 125 hp) thanks to the use of two twin-barrel 45 DCOE Weber carburetors.

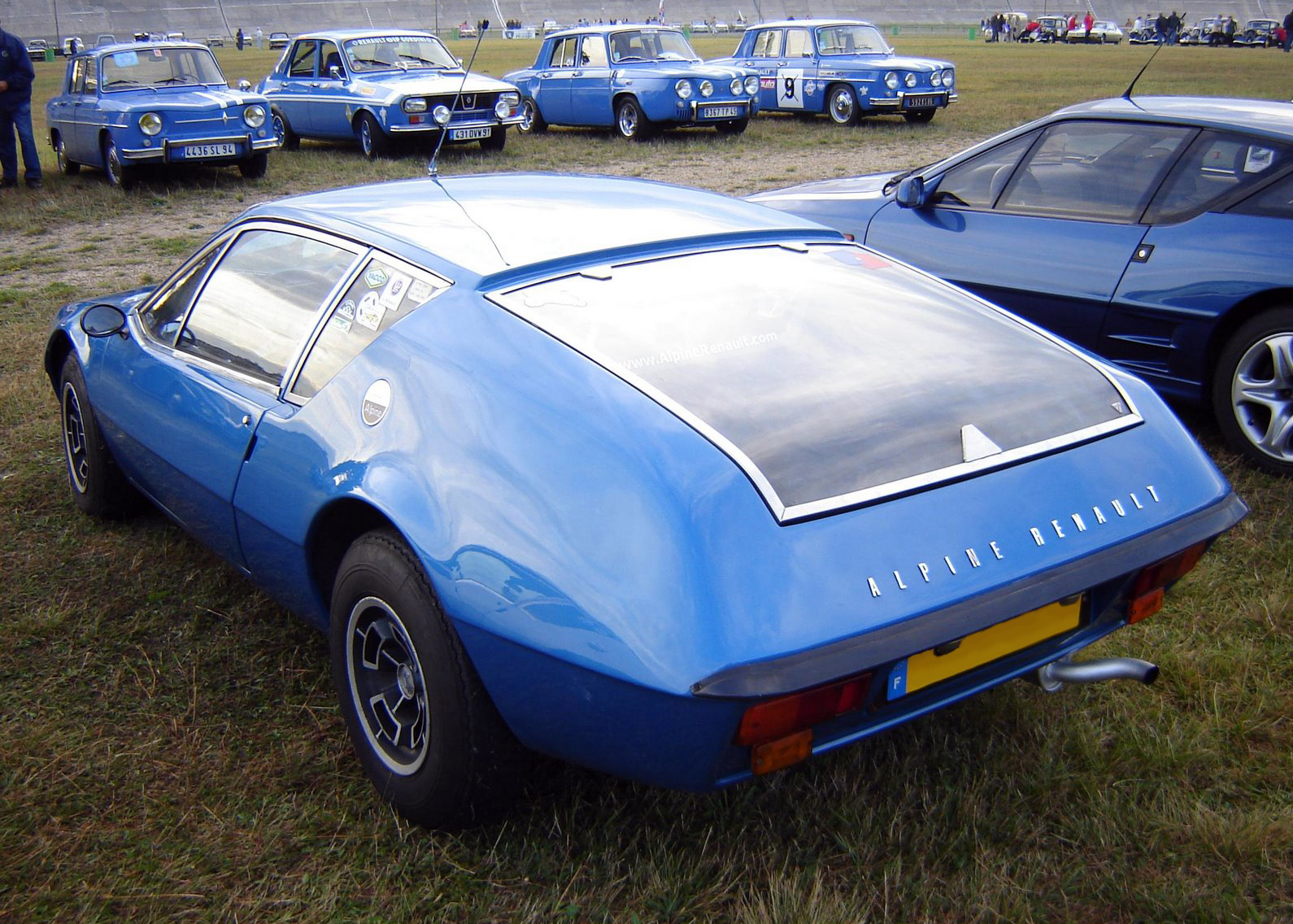
Rear view of an early, four-cylinder A310

The first model of the A310, built 1971-1976, was a car with a four-cylinder engine and six headlights. Being larger, heavier, and no more powerful than its predecessor, the early A310 was considered underpowered in comparison to the potential of the chassis. The car was first shown at the 1971 Geneva Motor Show. The prototype A310 had louvres across the rear windscreen; these were not carried over to the production model. Early models had a NACA duct mounted near the window atop the left front fender, later four-cylinder cars received two, mounted closer to the front of the car. In 1976, to help flagging sales, the lower-cost A310 SX was presented. This model has a 95 PS (70 kW; 94 hp) version of the Renault 16/17's 1647 cc inline-four and simplified equipment.

The basis of the A310 was a hefty tubular steel backbone chassis, clothed in a fiberglass shell. As with the previous A110, the entire body was molded in a single piece. Like the ill-fated DeLorean, which used the same PRV powertrain, the engine was mounted longitudinally in the rear, driving forward to the wheels through a manual five-speed gearbox. The driving position was low and sporty, although the front wheelwells encroached on the occupants' feet, pointing them towards the centre of the car. The A310 was labor-intensive, having been developed for small-scale artisanal production - a car took 130 hours to build from start to finish. The front axle also came in for some criticism, although in 1974 the balljoint mountings were replaced by rubber/steel bushings (silent-blocs) which somewhat improved durability. While many components of the A310 came from the Renault parts shelf as expected, others are more surprising - the steering rack is from the Peugeot 504, while the turn signals are Simca 1301 units.

=== A310 V6 ===
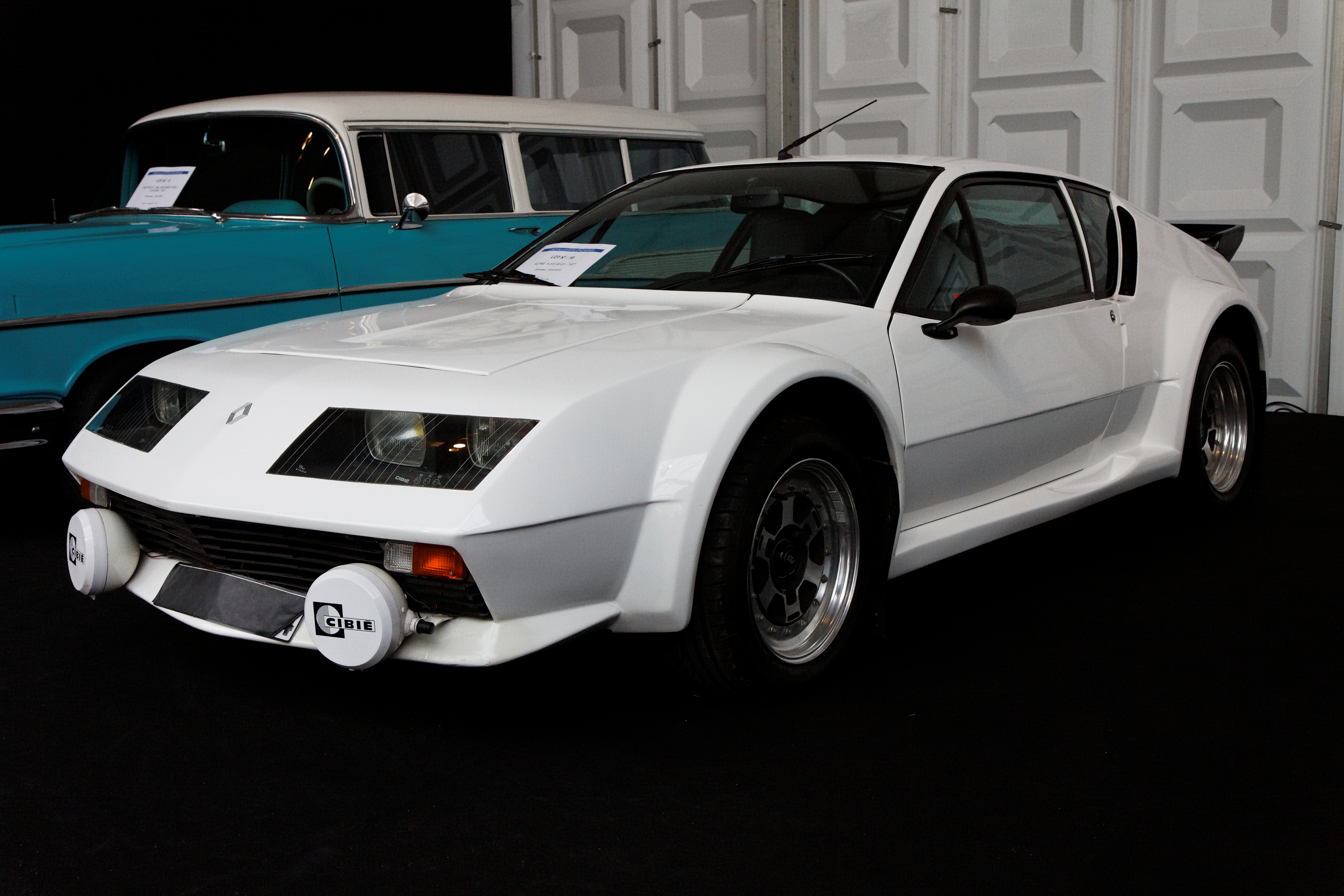
Alpine A310 V6 GT

In 1976 the A310 was restyled by Robert Opron and fitted with the more powerful and newly developed 90-degree 2664 cc V6 PRV engine, as used in some Peugeots, Renaults, and Volvos. The later V6 received a black plastic rear spoiler as well, useful for keeping the tail planted but somewhat marring the purity of the original's lines. With 150 PS (110 kW; 148 hp) on tap, the A310 PRV V6 was Renault's performance flagship capable of 220 km/h (137 mph) and acceptable acceleration. The tail-heavy weight distribution gave handling characteristics similar to the contemporary Porsche 911. Sales did pick up, more than doubling those of the four-cylinder predecessor, but then tapered off as production continued without any updates to make it a serious Porsche competitor in the marketplace. Sales were predominantly in France, with 781 cars sold in its home market in 1979 (its best year). By 1984 fewer than five hundred Alpines were sold in France, while Porsche sold about 1600 in spite of industrial strikes in Germany.

Beginning with model year 1981 (in late 1980), the rear suspension was shared with the mid-engined Renault 5 Turbo. Rather than the previous three-lug wheels, the A310 also received the alloys used for the 5 Turbo, albeit without the painted elements.

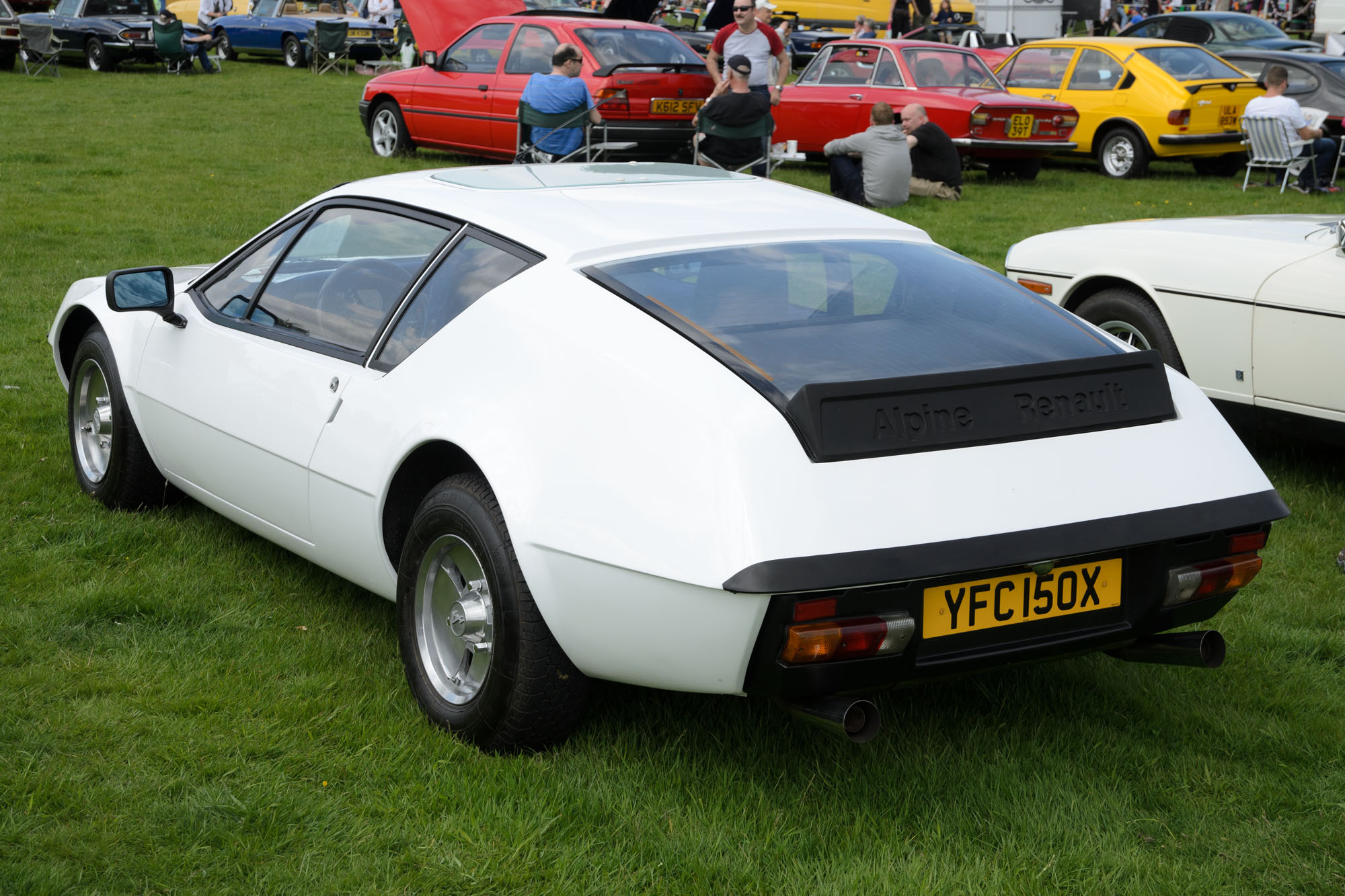
Alpine A310 V6 (1976–1980, rear)

In the later models (1983-1984) of the A310 a "Pack GT" which was inspired from the Group 4 A310 racing cars would be developed, it gained wheel arches and larger spoilers front and rear. A few Alpine A310 V6 Pack GT Kit Boulogne were built (27 examples), here the PRV V6 was bored out to 2.9 litres and was then further modified by Alpine, fitted with triple Weber 42DCNF carburetors that pushed power to 193 PS (142 kW; 190 hp).

== Competition ==
In 1973 the A310 was designated to replace the A110 in the World Rally Championship, where it saw mixed success. The A310 also had great success in French motorsport as a Group 4 car. In 1977 Guy Fréquelin (Alpine Renault A 310-V6) won the French Rally championship. In 1983 the car was moved to the Group B rally stage.

== Production ==
A310 four-cylinder	Production
1971	120 units
1972	575 units
1973	666 units
1974	344 units
1975	306 units
1976	329 units
TOTAL	2 340 units

A310 V6	Production
1976	140 units
1977	1 220 units
1978	1 216 units
1979	1 381 units
1980	1 138 units
1981	1 284 units
1982	1 095 units
1983	1 139 units
1984	663 units
TOTAL	9 276 units

=== Production models ===
==== A310 4-cylinder model variants ====
===== 1971–1976 =====
A310 1600 Series 1 (55 L fuel tank, 3 stud suspension, four-cylinder engine, 5-speed transmission)

Model	Years	Engine	Transmission	Power	Admission	Weight
VE	1971–1973	1605 cc (R17TS Injection)	type 365-10	124 PS (91 kW; 122 hp) DIN at 6000 rpm	carburetors - twin 45 DCOE weber	840 kg (1,852 lb)
VF	1974–1976	1605 cc (R17TS Injection/Gordini)	type 365-10	127 PS (93 kW; 125 hp) DIN at 6450 rpm	Injection - electronic direct Bosch D-Jetronic	825 kg (1,819 lb)
VG	1976	1647 cc (R17 Gordini)	type 365-24	95 PS (70 kW; 94 hp) DIN at 6000 rpm	carburetors - single weber, double throat 32 Weber DAR7	825 kg (1,819 lb)

==== A310 V6 model variants ====
===== 1977–1984 =====
Model	Years	Engine	Transmission	Power	Admission	Weight	Fuel capacity
A310 V6 Series 1	1977–1980	2664 cc (R30 TS) V6	manual transmission 4-speed (type 367-05); 5-speed (type 369-02)	150 PS (110 kW) DIN at 6000 rpm	1 carburetor single throat Solex 34 TBIA and 1 carburetor double throat Solex 35 CEEI; 3 stud R30 inspired suspension.	980 kg (2,161 lb)	62 L
A310 V6 Series 2	1981–1985	2664 cc (R30 TS) V6	manual transmission 5-speed (type 369-02)	150 PS (110 kW) DIN at 6000 rpm	1 carburetor single throat Solex 34 TBIA and 1 carburetor double throat Solex 35 CEEI. 4 stud R5 Turbo inspired suspension, restyled exterior, new bumpers	980 kg (2,161 lb)	62 L
A310 V6 "Pack GT"	1982–1985	2664 cc (R30 TS) V6	manual transmission 5-speed (type 369-02)	150 PS (110 kW) DIN at 6000 rpm	1 carburetor single throat Solex 34 TBIA and 1 carburetor double throat Solex 35 CEEI. 4 stud R5 Turbo inspired suspension, flared arches, aerodynamic kit, larger wheels etc.	980 kg (2,161 lb)	62 L
A310 V6 "Pack GT Boulogne"	1982–1985	2849 cc (PRV) V6	manual transmission 5-speed (type 369-02)	193 PS (142 kW) DIN at 6000 rpm	2 carburetor triple throat vertical Weber 46 IDA. 4 stud R5 Turbo inspired suspension, flared arches, aerodynamic kit, larger wheels, etc		62 L

=== Production numbers ===
Modelyear	Engine	Model	From	To
1971	4-cylinder twin-carb	1600 VE	001	0010
1972	4-cylinder twin-carb	1600 VE	0011	0550
1973	4-cylinder twin-carb	1600 VE	0551	1200
1974	4-cylinder injection	1600 VF	21185	21750
1975	4-cylinder injection	1600 VF	21751	22016
1976	4-cylinder injection	1600 VF	22017	22137
1976	4-cylinder single carb	1600 VG	40000	40386
1977	V6	2700 VA	43015	43795
1978	V6	2700 VA	43796	45089
1979	V6	2700 VA	45090	46355
1979	V6 GR IV	2700 VA	45090	46355
1980	V6	2700 VA	46356	47683
1981	V6	2700 VA	47710	48847
1982	V6	2700 VA	48848	49960
1983	V6	2700 VA	49961	52093
1983	V6 GT	2700 VAA	49961	52093
1984	V6	2700 VA	E0000001	E0001781
1984	V6 GT	2700 VAA	E0000001	E0001781
1985	V6	2700 VA	F0000324	F0001874
1985	V6 GT	2700 VAA	F0000324	F0001874

== Future Development ==
In February 2025, Alpine announced a second generation of the A310, based on the 800V Alpine Performance Platform which is being developed by Hypercar Alpine. This model is intended to enter the market in 2027 or 2028, following the release of the third-generation A110.
