= List of World Rally Championship event winners =

The World Rally Championship (WRC) is a rallying series organised by the FIA, culminating with a champion driver and manufacturer. The driver's world championship and manufacturer's world championship are separate championships, but based on the same point system. The series currently consists of 14 events driven on surfaces ranging from gravel and tarmac to snow and ice. Each rally is split into 10–25 special stages which are run against the clock on closed roads.

Sébastien Loeb holds the record for the most event victories, having won 80 times. Sébastien Ogier is second with 69 wins and Marcus Grönholm is third with 30 wins. Sébastien Loeb holds the distinction of having the longest time between his first win and his last. He won his first rally in 2002 at the 2002 Rallye Deutschland, and his last in 2022 at the 2022 Monte Carlo Rally, a span of 19 years, 4 months and 28 days. Esapekka Lappi holds the record for the longest period of time between two wins – 6 years and 204 days between the 2017 Rally Finland and the 2024 Rally Sweden for the Finnish driver. Loeb holds the record for the most consecutive wins, having two six-win streaks (2005 Rally New Zealand–2005 Rally Argentina and 2008 Wales Rally GB–2009 Rally Argentina). Kalle Rovanperä is the youngest winner of a World Rally Championship event; he was 20 years, 11 months and 17 days old when he won the 2021 Rally Estonia. Loeb is the oldest winner of a World Rally Championship event; he was 47 years and 331 days old when he won the 2022 Monte Carlo Rally. Jari-Matti Latvala holds the record for the most event wins (18) without ever winning a championship.

As of the 2026 Rally Italia Sardegna, there have been 83 different World Rally Championship event winners. The first rally winner was Jean-Claude Andruet at the 1973 Rally Monte Carlo, and the most recent driver to score their first win was Sami Pajari at the 2026 Rally Estonia.

== By driver ==
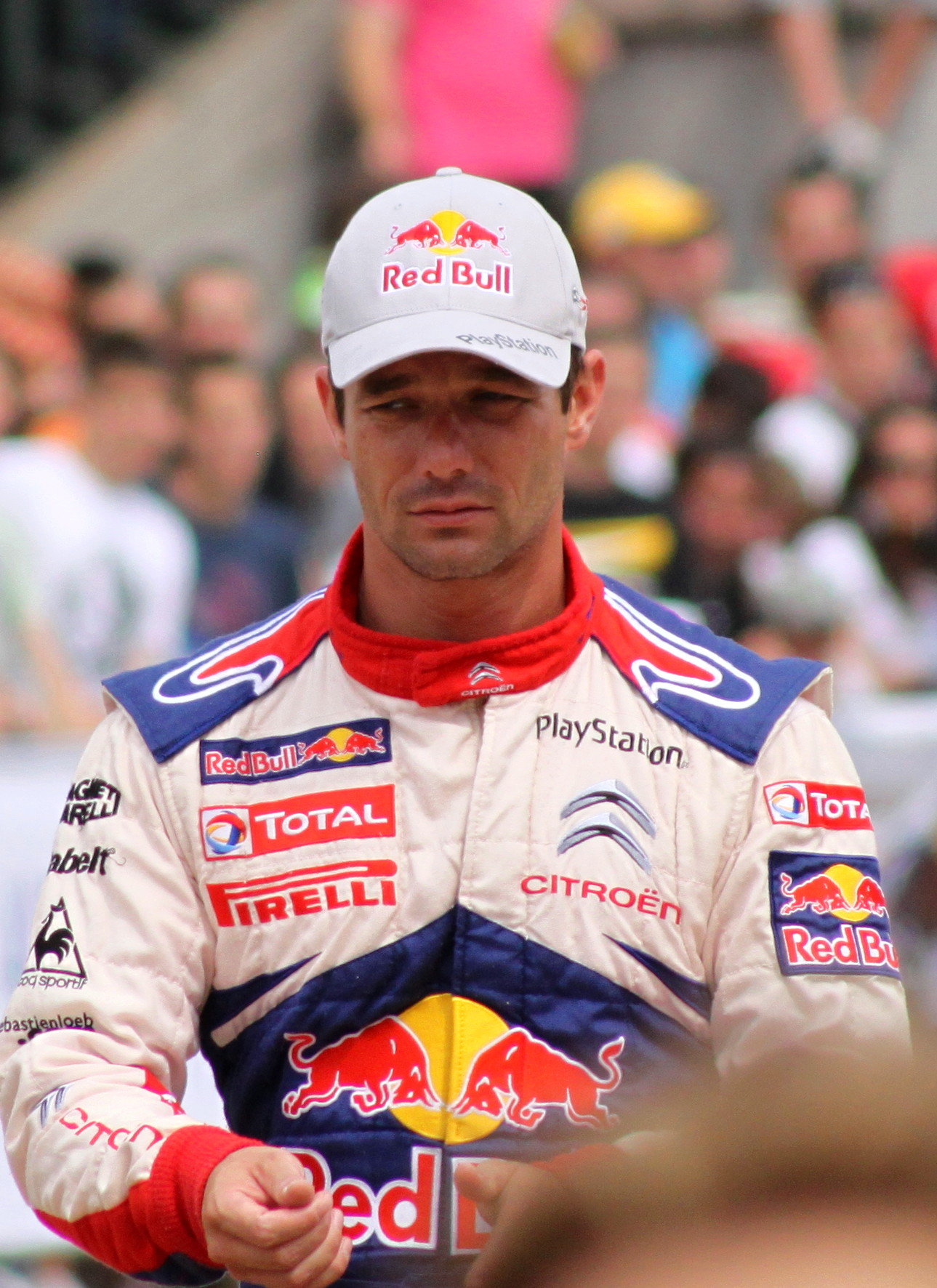
Sébastien Loeb, who has won 80 World Rally Championship events.

All figures correct as of the 2026 Rally Italia Sardegna. In total of 681 WRC events.

Key
| **Bold** | Driver has competed in the 2026 season |
| Italics | World Rally Champion |

World Rally Championship event winners
| Rank | Country | Driver | Wins | Seasons active | First win | Last win |
|---|---|---|---|---|---|---|
| 1 | France | Sébastien Loeb | 80 | 1999–2013, 2015, 2018–2020, 2022 | (Germany) 2002 Rallye Deutschland | (Monaco) 2022 Monte Carlo Rally |
| 2 | France | **Sébastien Ogier** | 69 | 2008–2026 | 2010 Rally de Portugal | (Greece) 2026 Acropolis Rally |
| 3 | Finland | Marcus Grönholm | 30 | 1989–2007, 2009–2010, 2019 | (Sweden) 2000 Swedish Rally | 2007 Rally New Zealand |
| 4 | Spain | Carlos Sainz | 26 | 1987–2005 | (Greece) 1990 Acropolis Rally | 2004 Rally Argentina |
| 5 | United Kingdom | Colin McRae | 25 | 1987–2003, 2005–2006 | 1993 Rally New Zealand | (Kenya) 2002 Safari Rally |
| 6 | Finland | Tommi Mäkinen | 24 | 1987–2003 | (Finland) 1994 1000 Lakes Rally | (Monaco) 2002 Monte Carlo Rally |
| 7 | Finland | Juha Kankkunen | 23 | 1979, 1982–2003, 2010 | (Kenya) 1985 Safari Rally | 1999 Rally Finland |
| 8 | Belgium | **Thierry Neuville** | 23 | 2009–2010, 2012–2026 | (Germany) 2014 Rallye Deutschland | 2026 Rally de Portugal |
| 9 | Estonia | Ott Tänak | 22 | 2009–2012, 2014–2025 | (Italy) 2017 Rally Italia Sardegna | (Greece) 2025 Acropolis Rally |
| 10 | France | Didier Auriol | 20 | 1984–2003, 2005 | (France) 1988 Tour de Corse | (Catalonia) 2001 Rally Catalunya |
| 11 | Finland | Markku Alén | 19 | 1973–1993, 2001 | 1975 Rally Portugal | (United Kingdom) 1988 RAC Rally |
| 12 | Finland | Hannu Mikkola | 18 | 1973–1993 | (Finland) 1974 1000 Lakes Rally | (Kenya) 1987 Safari Rally |
| 13 | Finland | Jari-Matti Latvala | 18 | 2002–2020, 2023–2026 | (Sweden) 2008 Swedish Rally | 2018 Rally Australia |
| 14 | Finland | Kalle Rovanperä | 18 | 2017–2025 | 2021 Rally Estonia | (European Union) 2025 Central European Rally |
| 15 | Italy | Miki Biasion | 17 | 1980–1994 | 1986 Rally Argentina | (Greece) 1993 Acropolis Rally |
| 16 | Sweden | Björn Waldegård | 16 | 1973–1992 | (Sweden) 1975 Swedish Rally | (Kenya) 1990 Safari Rally |
| 17 | Finland | Mikko Hirvonen | 15 | 2002–2014 | 2006 Rally Australia | (Italy) 2012 Rally Italia Sardegna |
| 18 | Germany | Walter Röhrl | 14 | 1973–1987 | (Greece) 1975 Acropolis Rally | (Italy) 1985 San Remo Rally |
| 19 | Norway | Petter Solberg | 13 | 1998–2012, 2018–2019 | (Wales) 2002 Rally GB | (Wales) 2005 Rally GB |
| 20 | United Kingdom | **Elfyn Evans** | 13 | 2007, 2011, 2013–2026 | 2017 Wales Rally GB | 2026 Rally Japan |
| 21 | Sweden | Stig Blomqvist | 11 | 1973–2006 | (Sweden) 1973 Swedish Rally | (Ivory Coast) 1984 Rallye Côte d'Ivoire |
| 22 | Finland | Timo Salonen | 11 | 1974–1992, 2002 | (Canada) 1977 Critérium du Québec | (Sweden) 1987 Swedish Rally |
| 23 | Finland | Ari Vatanen | 10 | 1974–1998, 2003 | (Greece) 1980 Acropolis Rally | (Sweden) 1985 Swedish Rally |
| 24 | United Kingdom | Richard Burns | 10 | 1990–2003 | (Kenya) 1998 Safari Rally | 2001 Rally New Zealand |
| 25 | France | Bernard Darniche | 7 | 1973–1987 | 1973 Rally of Morocco | (France) 1981 Tour de Corse |
| 26 | Italy | Sandro Munari | 7 | 1973–1984 | (Italy) 1974 San Remo Rally | (Monaco) 1977 Monte Carlo Rally |
| 27 | France | Gilles Panizzi | 7 | 1990–2006 | (France) 2000 Tour de Corse | (Catalonia) 2003 Rally Catalunya |
| 28 | Sweden | Kenneth Eriksson | 6 | 1980–2002 | (Ivory Coast) 1987 Rallye Côte d'Ivoire | 1997 Rally New Zealand |
| 29 | France | Jean-Luc Thérier | 5 | 1973–1984 | 1973 Rallye de Portugal | (France) 1980 Tour de Corse |
| 30 | Kenya | Shekhar Mehta | 5 | 1973–1987 | (Kenya) 1973 Safari Rally | (Kenya) 1982 Safari Rally |
| 31 | France | Jean-Pierre Nicolas | 5 | 1973–1980, 1984 | (France) 1973 Tour de Corse | 1978 Ivory Coast Rally |
| 32 | Estonia | Markko Märtin | 5 | 1997–2005 | (Greece) 2003 Acropolis Rally | (Catalonia) 2004 Rally Catalunya |
| 33 | United Kingdom/Andorra | Kris Meeke | 5 | 2002–2008, 2011, 2013–2019 | 2015 Rally Argentina | (Catalonia) 2017 Rally Catalunya |
| 34 | Finland | Timo Mäkinen | 4 | 1973–1994 | (Finland) 1973 1000 Lakes Rally | (United Kingdom) 1975 Lombard RAC Rally |
| 35 | France | Michèle Mouton | 4 | 1974–1986 | (Italy) 1981 Rallye Sanremo | 1982 Rally Brazil |
| 36 | France | François Delecour | 4 | 1984–2017 | 1993 Rallye Portugal | (Monaco) 1994 Monte Carlo Rally |
| 37 | Sweden | **Oliver Solberg** | 4 | 2019–2026 | 2025 Rally Estonia | (Italy) 2026 Rally Italia Sardegna |
| 38 | France | Jean-Claude Andruet | 3 | 1973–1986, 1995 | (Monaco) 1973 Monte Carlo Rally | (Italy) 1977 San Remo Rally |
| 39 | Finland | Henri Toivonen | 3 | 1975–1986 | (United Kingdom) 1980 Lombard RAC Rally | (Monaco) 1986 Monte Carlo Rally |
| 40 | France | Jean Ragnotti | 3 | 1973–1987, 1990–1995 | (Monaco) 1981 Monte Carlo Rally | (France) 1985 Tour de Corse |
| 41 | Norway | Andreas Mikkelsen | 3 | 2006–2022, 2024 | (Catalonia) 2015 Rally Catalunya | 2016 Rally Australia |
| 42 | Spain | **Dani Sordo** | 3 | 2003–2024, 2026 | (Germany) 2013 Rallye Deutschland | (Italy) 2020 Rally Italia Sardegna |
| 43 | Finland | **Sami Pajari** | 3 | 2019–2026 | 2026 Rally Estonia | 2026 Rally del Paraguay |
| 44 | Germany | Achim Warmbold | 2 | 1973–1975, 1978–1986, 2000 | 1973 Rally of Poland | (Austria) 1973 Austrian Alpine Rally |
| 45 | Kenya | Joginder Singh | 2 | 1973–1980 | (Kenya) 1974 Safari Rally | (Kenya) 1976 Safari Rally |
| 46 | France | Bruno Saby | 2 | 1973–1991 | (France) 1986 Tour de Corse | (Monaco) 1988 Monte Carlo Rally |
| 47 | Sweden | Ingvar Carlsson | 2 | 1974–1991 | (Sweden) 1989 Swedish Rally | 1989 Rally New Zealand |
| 48 | Sweden | Mikael Ericsson | 2 | 1981–1993 | 1989 Rally Argentina | (Finland) 1989 1000 Lakes Rally |
| 49 | Japan | Kenjiro Shinozuka | 2 | 1976–1991 | (Ivory Coast) 1991 Rallye Côte d'Ivoire | (Ivory Coast) 1992 Rallye Côte d'Ivoire |
| 50 | Sweden | Mats Jonsson | 2 | 1979–2007 | (Sweden) 1992 Swedish Rally | (Sweden) 1993 Swedish Rally |
| 51 | France | Philippe Bugalski | 2 | 1984–2004 | (Catalonia) 1999 Rallye Catalunya | (France) 1999 Tour de Corse |
| 52 | Finland | **Esapekka Lappi** | 2 | 2011–2013, 2015–2024, 2026 | 2017 Rally Finland | 2024 Rally Sweden |
| 53 | Japan | **Takamoto Katsuta** | 2 | 2016–2026 | (Kenya) 2026 Safari Rally | 2026 Croatia Rally |
| 54 | Canada | Walter Boyce | 1 | 1973–1974, 1977–1978, 1986 | (United States) 1973 Press-on-Regardless Rally | (United States) 1973 Press-on-Regardless Rally |
| 55 | Italy | Raffaele Pinto | 1 | 1973–1978 | 1974 Rally Portugal | 1974 Rally Portugal |
| 56 | Sweden | Ove Andersson | 1 | 1973–1982 | (Kenya) 1975 Safari Rally | (Kenya) 1975 Safari Rally |
| 57 | Sweden | Per Eklund | 1 | 1973–1997 | (Sweden) 1976 Swedish Rally | (Sweden) 1976 Swedish Rally |
| 58 | Sweden | Harry Källström | 1 | 1973–1980 | (Greece) 1976 Acropolis Rally | (Greece) 1976 Acropolis Rally |
| 59 | United Kingdom | Roger Clark | 1 | 1973–1981, 1984, 1995 | (United Kingdom) 1976 Lombard RAC Rally | (United Kingdom) 1976 Lombard RAC Rally |
| 60 | Italy | Fulvio Bacchelli | 1 | 1973–1982 | 1977 Rally New Zealand | 1977 Rally New Zealand |
| 61 | Finland | Kyösti Hämäläinen | 1 | 1973–1982, 1985–1988 | (Finland) 1977 1000 Lakes Rally | (Finland) 1977 1000 Lakes Rally |
| 62 | Italy | Antonio Fassina | 1 | 1976–1981 | (Italy) 1979 Rallye Sanremo | (Italy) 1979 Rallye Sanremo |
| 63 | Sweden | Anders Kulläng | 1 | 1973–1988 | (Sweden) 1980 Swedish Rally | (Sweden) 1980 Swedish Rally |
| 64 | France | Guy Fréquelin | 1 | 1973–1987 | 1981 Rally Argentina | 1981 Rally Argentina |
| 65 | Portugal | Joaquim Moutinho | 1 | 1973–1986 | 1986 Rally de Portugal | 1986 Rally de Portugal |
| 66 | France | Bernard Béguin | 1 | 1974–1993 | (France) 1987 Tour de Corse | (France) 1987 Tour de Corse |
| 67 | Austria | Franz Wittmann Sr. | 1 | 1973–1989 | 1987 Rally New Zealand | 1987 Rally New Zealand |
| 68 | Austria | Sepp Haider | 1 | 1977–1993 | 1988 Rally New Zealand | 1988 Rally New Zealand |
| 69 | Argentina | Jorge Recalde | 1 | 1980–2000 | 1988 Rally Argentina | 1988 Rally Argentina |
| 70 | France | Alain Ambrosino | 1 | 1974–1990 | (Ivory Coast) 1988 Rallye Côte d'Ivoire | (Ivory Coast) 1988 Rallye Côte d'Ivoire |
| 71 | France | Alain Oreille | 1 | 1984–1996 | (Ivory Coast) 1989 Rallye Côte d'Ivoire | (Ivory Coast) 1989 Rallye Côte d'Ivoire |
| 72 | Finland | Pentti Airikkala | 1 | 1973–1990, 2003 | (United Kingdom) 1989 Lombard RAC Rally | (United Kingdom) 1989 Lombard RAC Rally |
| 73 | France | Patrick Tauziac | 1 | 1984–1992 | (Ivory Coast) 1990 Rallye Côte d'Ivoire | (Ivory Coast) 1990 Rallye Côte d'Ivoire |
| 74 | Germany | Armin Schwarz | 1 | 1988–2005 | (Catalonia) 1991 Rally Catalunya | (Catalonia) 1991 Rally Catalunya |
| 75 | Italy | Andrea Aghini | 1 | 1986–2000 | (Italy) 1992 Rallye Sanremo | (Italy) 1992 Rallye Sanremo |
| 76 | Italy | Franco Cunico | 1 | 1981–2000 | (Italy) 1993 Rallye Sanremo | (Italy) 1993 Rallye Sanremo |
| 77 | Kenya | Ian Duncan | 1 | 1973–1982 | (Kenya) 1994 Safari Rally | (Kenya) 1994 Safari Rally |
| 78 | Italy | Piero Liatti | 1 | 1990–2004 | (Monaco) 1997 Monte Carlo Rally | (Monaco) 1997 Monte Carlo Rally |
| 79 | Finland | Harri Rovanperä | 1 | 1993–2006 | (Sweden) 2001 Swedish Rally | (Sweden) 2001 Swedish Rally |
| 80 | Spain | Jesús Puras | 1 | 1991–2002 | (France) 2001 Tour de Corse | (France) 2001 Tour de Corse |
| 81 | Belgium | François Duval | 1 | 2000–2008, 2010 | 2005 Rally Australia | 2005 Rally Australia |
| 82 | Norway | Mads Østberg | 1 | 2006–2021 | 2012 Rally de Portugal | 2012 Rally de Portugal |
| 83 | New Zealand | **Hayden Paddon** | 1 | 2007–2019, 2022, 2026 | 2016 Rally Argentina | 2016 Rally Argentina |

=== By driver's nationality ===
All figures correct as of the 2026 Rally Italia Sardegna.

| Rank | Country | Wins | Driver(s) |
|---|---|---|---|
| 1 | France | 216 | 18 |
| 2 | Finland | 201 | 17 |
| 3 | United Kingdom | 54 | 5 |
| 4 | Sweden | 47 | 11 |
| 5 | Italy | 30 | 8 |
| 5 | Spain | 30 | 3 |
| 7 | Estonia | 27 | 2 |
| 8 | Belgium | 24 | 2 |
| 9 | Germany | 17 | 3 |
| 9 | Norway | 17 | 3 |
| 11 | Kenya | 8 | 3 |
| 12 | Japan | 4 | 2 |
| 13 | Austria | 2 | 2 |
| 14 | Argentina | 1 | 1 |
| 14 | Canada | 1 | 1 |
| 14 | New Zealand | 1 | 1 |
| 14 | Portugal | 1 | 1 |

== Milestone races winners ==
| Race number | Year | Rally | Winner | |
| Race number | Year | Rally | Driver | Manufacturers |
|---|---|---|---|---|
| 100 | 1982 | (Monaco) Monte Carlo Rally | (West Germany) Walter Röhrl | (West Germany) Opel |
| 200 | 1990 | Rallye de Portugal | (Italy) Miki Biasion | (Italy) Lancia |
| 300 | 1998 | (Greece) Acropolis Rally | (United Kingdom) Colin McRae | (Japan) Subaru |
| 400 | 2005 | Rally Argentina | (France) Sébastien Loeb | (France) Citroën |
| 500 | 2012 | Rally Finland | (France) Sébastien Loeb | (France) Citroën |
| 600 | 2020 | Rally Estonia | (Estonia) Ott Tänak | (South Korea) Hyundai |

== Most wins per season ==
All figures correct as of 2026 Rally Italia Sardegna.

Key
| **Bold** | Won the World Championship in the same year |

| Year | Driver(s) | Manufacturer(s) | Wins | Races |
|---|---|---|---|---|
| 1973 | (France) Jean-Luc Thérier | (France) Alpine-Renault | 3 | 13 |
| 1974 | (Italy) Sandro Munari | (Italy) Lancia | 2 | 8 |
| 1975 | (Sweden) Björn Waldegård | (Italy) Lancia | 2 | 10 |
| 1975 | (Finland) Hannu Mikkola | (France) Peugeot | 1 | 10 |
| 1975 | (Finland) Hannu Mikkola | (Japan) Toyota | 1 | 10 |
| 1976 | (Italy) Sandro Munari | (Italy) Lancia | 3 | 10 |
| 1977 | (Sweden) Björn Waldegård | (United States) Ford | 3 | 11 |
| 1978 | (Finland) **Markku Alén** | (Italy) Fiat | 2 | 11 |
| 1978 | (Finland) **Markku Alén** | (Italy) Lancia | 1 | 11 |
| 1978 | (France) Jean-Pierre Nicolas | (West Germany) Porsche | 1 | 11 |
| 1978 | (France) Jean-Pierre Nicolas | (France) Peugeot | 2 | 11 |
| 1979 | (Finland) Hannu Mikkola | (United States) Ford | 3 | 12 |
| 1979 | (Finland) Hannu Mikkola | (West Germany) Mercedes-Benz | 1 | 12 |
| 1980 | (West Germany) **Walter Röhrl** | (Italy) Fiat | 4 | 12 |
| 1981 | (Finland) **Ari Vatanen** | (United States) Ford | 3 | 12 |
| 1982 | (France) Michèle Mouton | (West Germany) Audi | 3 | 12 |
| 1983 | (Finland) **Hannu Mikkola** | (West Germany) Audi | 4 | 12 |
| 1984 | (Sweden) **Stig Blomqvist** | (West Germany) Audi | 5 | 12 |
| 1985 | (Finland) **Timo Salonen** | (France) Peugeot | 5 | 12 |
| 1986 | (Finland) **Juha Kankkunen** | (France) Peugeot | 3 | 12 |
| 1987 | (Italy) Miki Biasion | (Italy) Lancia | 3 | 13 |
| 1987 | (Finland) Markku Alén | (Italy) Lancia | 3 | 13 |
| 1988 | (Italy) **Miki Biasion** | (Italy) Lancia | 5 | 13 |
| 1989 | (Italy) **Miki Biasion** | (Italy) Lancia | 5 | 13 |
| 1990 | (Spain) **Carlos Sainz** | (Japan) Toyota | 4 | 12 |
| 1991 | (Finland) **Juha Kankkunen** | (Italy) Lancia | 5 | 14 |
| 1991 | (Spain) Carlos Sainz | (Japan) Toyota | 5 | 14 |
| 1992 | (France) Didier Auriol | (Italy) Lancia | 6 | 14 |
| 1993 | (Finland) **Juha Kankkunen** | (Japan) Toyota | 5 | 13 |
| 1994 | (France) **Didier Auriol** | (Japan) Toyota | 3 | 10 |
| 1995 | (Spain) Carlos Sainz | (Japan) Subaru | 3 | 8 |
| 1996 | (Finland) **Tommi Mäkinen** | (Japan) Mitsubishi | 5 | 9 |
| 1997 | (United Kingdom) Colin McRae | (Japan) Subaru | 5 | 14 |
| 1998 | (Finland) **Tommi Mäkinen** | (Japan) Mitsubishi | 5 | 13 |
| 1999 | (Finland) **Tommi Mäkinen** | (Japan) Mitsubishi | 4 | 14 |
| 2000 | (Finland) **Marcus Grönholm** | (France) Peugeot | 4 | 14 |
| 2000 | (United Kingdom) Richard Burns | (Japan) Subaru | 4 | 14 |
| 2001 | (United Kingdom) Colin McRae | (United Kingdom) Ford | 3 | 14 |
| 2001 | (Finland) Tommi Mäkinen | (Japan) Mitsubishi | 3 | 14 |
| 2001 | (Finland) Marcus Grönholm | (France) Peugeot | 3 | 14 |
| 2002 | (Finland) **Marcus Grönholm** | (France) Peugeot | 5 | 14 |
| 2003 | (Norway) **Petter Solberg** | (Japan) Subaru | 4 | 14 |
| 2004 | (France) **Sébastien Loeb** | (France) Citroën | 6 | 16 |
| 2005 | (France) **Sébastien Loeb** | (France) Citroën | 10 | 16 |
| 2006 | (France) **Sébastien Loeb** | (France) Citroën | 8 | 12 |
| 2007 | (France) **Sébastien Loeb** | (France) Citroën | 8 | 16 |
| 2008 | (France) **Sébastien Loeb** | (France) Citroën | 11 | 15 |
| 2009 | (France) **Sébastien Loeb** | (France) Citroën | 7 | 12 |
| 2010 | (France) **Sébastien Loeb** | (France) Citroën | 8 | 13 |
| 2011 | (France) **Sébastien Loeb** | (France) Citroën | 5 | 13 |
| 2011 | (France) Sébastien Ogier | (France) Citroën | 5 | 13 |
| 2012 | (France) **Sébastien Loeb** | (France) Citroën | 9 | 13 |
| 2013 | (France) **Sébastien Ogier** | (Germany) Volkswagen | 9 | 13 |
| 2014 | (France) **Sébastien Ogier** | (Germany) Volkswagen | 8 | 13 |
| 2015 | (France) **Sébastien Ogier** | (Germany) Volkswagen | 8 | 13 |
| 2016 | (France) **Sébastien Ogier** | (Germany) Volkswagen | 6 | 13 |
| 2017 | (Belgium) Thierry Neuville | (South Korea) Hyundai | 4 | 13 |
| 2018 | (France) **Sébastien Ogier** | (United Kingdom) Ford | 4 | 13 |
| 2018 | (Estonia) Ott Tänak | (Japan) Toyota | 4 | 13 |
| 2019 | (Estonia) **Ott Tänak** | (Japan) Toyota | 6 | 13 |
| 2020 | (United Kingdom) Elfyn Evans | (Japan) Toyota | 2 | 7 |
| 2020 | (France) **Sébastien Ogier** | (Japan) Toyota | 2 | 7 |
| 2021 | (France) **Sébastien Ogier** | (Japan) Toyota | 5 | 12 |
| 2022 | (Finland) **Kalle Rovanperä** | (Japan) Toyota | 6 | 13 |
| 2023 | (France) Sébastien Ogier | (Japan) Toyota | 3 | 13 |
| 2023 | (Finland) **Kalle Rovanperä** | (Japan) Toyota | 3 | 13 |
| 2023 | (United Kingdom) Elfyn Evans | (Japan) Toyota | 3 | 13 |
| 2024 | (Finland) Kalle Rovanperä | (Japan) Toyota | 4 | 13 |
| 2025 | (France) **Sébastien Ogier** | (Japan) Toyota | 6 | 11 |
| 2026 | (Sweden) Oliver Solberg | (Japan) Toyota | 3 | 13 |
| 2026 | (Finland) Sami Pajari | (Japan) Toyota | 3 | 13 |

== By co-driver ==
The WRC events have been won by 105 different co-drivers. All figures correct as of the 2026 Rally Italia Sardegna.

Key
| **Bold** | Driver has competed in the 2026 season |
| Italics | World Rally Champion |

World Rally Championship event winners
| Rank | Country | Co-driver | Wins |
|---|---|---|---|
| 1 | Monaco | Daniel Elena | 79 |
| 2 | France | Julien Ingrassia | 54 |
| 3 | Finland | Timo Rautiainen | 30 |
| 4 | Spain | Luis Moya | 24 |
| 5 | Estonia | Martin Järveoja | 22 |
| 6 | United Kingdom | Nicky Grist | 21 |
| 7 | Finland | Seppo Harjanne | 20 |
| 8 | Finland | Ilkka Kivimäki | 19 |
| 9 | Sweden | Arne Hertz | 18 |
| 9 | Finland | Miikka Anttila | 18 |
| 9 | Finland | Jonne Halttunen | 18 |
| 12 | France | Bernard Occelli | 16 |
| 12 | Italy | Tiziano Siviero | 16 |
| 14 | Finland | Jarmo Lehtinen | 15 |
| 15 | Finland | Juha Piironen | 14 |
| 15 | France | **Vincent Landais** | 14 |
| 17 | Germany | Christian Geistdörfer | 13 |
| 17 | Finland | Risto Mannisenmäki | 13 |
| 17 | United Kingdom | Phil Mills | 13 |
| 17 | Sweden | Hans Thorszelius | 13 |
| 17 | Belgium | Nicolas Gilsoul | 13 |
| 22 | United Kingdom | **Scott Martin** | 12 |
| 23 | Sweden | Björn Cederberg | 10 |
| 23 | United Kingdom | Robert Reid | 10 |
| 23 | Belgium | **Martijn Wydaeghe** | 10 |
| 26 | United Kingdom | Derek Ringer | 8 |
| 27 | France | Alain Mahe | 7 |
| 27 | France | Herve Panizzi | 7 |
| 29 | United Kingdom | Terry Harryman | 6 |
| 30 | United Kingdom | Fred Gallagher | 5 |
| 30 | France | Denis Giraudet | 5 |
| 30 | Ireland | Paul Nagle | 5 |
| 30 | United Kingdom | Michael Park | 5 |
| 30 | Sweden | Staffan Parmander | 5 |
| 30 | Italy | Fabrizia Pons | 5 |
| 36 | Kenya | Mike Doughty | 4 |
| 36 | France | Daniel Grataloup | 4 |
| 36 | United Kingdom | Henry Liddon | 4 |
| 36 | Italy | Silvio Maiga | 4 |
| 36 | United Kingdom | David Richards | 4 |
| 36 | France | Jean Todt | 4 |
| 36 | United Kingdom | **Elliott Edmondson** | 4 |
| 43 | Belgium | Christian Delferrier | 3 |
| 43 | Italy | Mario Mannucci | 3 |
| 43 | Spain | Marc Martí | 3 |
| 43 | Spain | Carlos del Barrio | 3 |
| 43 | Finland | **Marko Salminen** | 3 |
| 48 | | 16 co-drivers | 2 |
| 65 | | 41 co-drivers | 1 |

== By constructor ==
21 different constructors have won a rally as of the 2026 Rally Italia Sardegna.

| Rank | Constructor | Wins |
|---|---|---|
| 1 | (Japan) Toyota | 117 |
| 2 | (France) Citroën | 102 |
| 3 | (United States) / (United Kingdom) Ford | 94 |
| 4 | (Italy) Lancia | 73 |
| 5 | (France) Peugeot | 48 |
| 6 | (Japan) Subaru | 47 |
| 7 | (Germany) Volkswagen | 44 |
| 8 | (South Korea) Hyundai | 35 |
| 9 | (Japan) Mitsubishi | 34 |
| 10 | (Germany) Audi | 24 |
| 11 | (Italy) Fiat | 21 |
| 12 | (Japan) Datsun/Nissan | 9 |
| 13 | (France) Alpine-Renault | 6 |
| 13 | (France) Renault | 6 |
| 13 | (Germany) Opel | 6 |
| 16 | (Sweden) Saab | 4 |
| 17 | (Japan) Mazda | 3 |
| 18 | (United Kingdom) Talbot | 2 |
| 18 | (Germany) BMW | 2 |
| 18 | (Germany) Porsche | 2 |
| 18 | (Germany) Mercedes-Benz | 2 |

== By youngest and oldest winners ==
Youngest winners
| # | Driver | Age | Event |
|---|---|---|---|
| 1 | (Finland) Kalle Rovanperä | 20 y, 289 d | 2021 Rally Estonia |
| 2 | (Finland) Jari-Matti Latvala | 22 y, 313 d | (Sweden) 2008 Swedish Rally |
| 3 | (Sweden) Oliver Solberg | 23 y, 300 d | 2025 Rally Estonia |
| 4 | (Finland) Henri Toivonen | 24 y, 86 d | (United Kingdom) 1980 RAC Rally |
| 5 | (Finland) Markku Alén | 24 y, 156 d | 1975 Rally Portugal |
| 6 | (Norway) Mads Østberg | 24 y, 173 d | 2012 Rally Portugal |
| 7 | (Finland) Sami Pajari | 24 y, 230 d | 2026 Rally Estonia |
| 8 | (Belgium) François Duval | 24 y, 359 d | 2005 Rally Australia |
| 9 | (United Kingdom) Colin McRae | 25 y, 2 d | 1993 Rally New Zealand |
| 10 | (Finland) Timo Salonen | 25 y, 345 d | (Canada) 1977 Critérium du Québec |

Oldest winners
| # | Driver | Age | Event |
|---|---|---|---|
| 1 | (France) Sébastien Loeb | 47 y, 331 d | (Monaco) 2022 Monte Carlo Rally |
| 2 | (Sweden) Björn Waldegård | 46 y, 155 d | (Kenya) 1990 Safari Rally |
| 3 | (Finland) Hannu Mikkola | 44 y, 331 d | (Kenya) 1987 Safari Rally |
| 4 | (Finland) Pentti Airikkala | 44 y, 80 d | (United Kingdom) 1989 RAC Rally |
| 5 | (Kenya) Joginder Singh | 44 y, 70 d | (Kenya) 1976 Safari Rally |
| 6 | (Japan) Kenjiro Shinozuka | 44 y, 13 d | (Ivory Coast) 1992 Rallye Côte d'Ivoire |
| 7 | (France) Didier Auriol | 42 y, 219 d | (Catalonia) 2001 Rally Catalunya |
| 8 | (France) Sébastien Ogier | 42 y, 193 d | (Greece) 2026 Acropolis Rally |
| 9 | (Sweden) Ingvar Carlsson | 42 y, 107 d | 1989 Rally New Zealand |
| 10 | (Spain) Carlos Sainz | 42 y, 98 d | 2004 Rally Argentina |

== See also ==
- List of World Rally Championship records
