= List of World Rally Championship records =

The list of records in the World Rally Championship includes records and statistics set in the World Rally Championship (WRC) from the 1973 season to present.

Key
Bold	Has participated in the 2026 World Rally Championship.

== Drivers ==
=== Wins ===
Championship wins
#	Driver	Total	Seasons
1	(France) Sébastien Loeb	9	2004, 2005, 2006, 2007, 2008, 2009, 2010, 2011, 2012
1	(France) **Sébastien Ogier**	9	2013, 2014, 2015, 2016, 2017, 2018, 2020, 2021, 2025
3	(Finland) Juha Kankkunen	4	1986, 1987, 1991, 1993
3	(Finland) Tommi Mäkinen	4	1996, 1997, 1998, 1999
5	(Germany) Walter Röhrl	2	1980, 1982
5	(Italy) Miki Biasion	2	1988, 1989
5	(Spain) Carlos Sainz	2	1990, 1992
5	(Finland) Marcus Grönholm	2	2000, 2002
5	(Finland) Kalle Rovanperä	2	2022, 2023
10	(Italy) Sandro Munari	1	1977
10	(Finland) Markku Alén	1	1978
10	(Sweden) Björn Waldegård	1	1979
10	(Finland) Ari Vatanen	1	1981
10	(Finland) Hannu Mikkola	1	1983
10	(Sweden) Stig Blomqvist	1	1984
10	(Finland) Timo Salonen	1	1985
10	(France) Didier Auriol	1	1994
10	(United Kingdom) Colin McRae	1	1995
10	(United Kingdom) Richard Burns	1	2001
10	(Norway) Petter Solberg	1	2003
10	(Estonia) Ott Tänak	1	2019
10	(Belgium) Thierry Neuville	1	2024
10	(United Kingdom) Elfyn Evans	1	2026

Event wins
#	Driver	Total
1	(France) Sébastien Loeb	80
2	(France) **Sébastien Ogier**	69
3	(Finland) Marcus Grönholm	30
4	(Spain) Carlos Sainz	26
5	(United Kingdom) Colin McRae	25
6	(Finland) Tommi Mäkinen	24
7	(Finland) Juha Kankkunen	23
8	(Belgium) **Thierry Neuville**	23
9	(Estonia) Ott Tänak	22
10	(France) Didier Auriol	20

Stage wins
#	Driver	Total
1	(France) Sébastien Loeb	939
2	(France) **Sébastien Ogier**	858 (Note: According to ewrc-results.)
3	(Finland) Markku Alén	853 (Note: According to World Rally Archive (http://www.juwra.com), Alén won 821 stages. Markku Alén also won special stages in the following rallies that are not yet taken into account by www.juwra.com : 15 stages in Sweden 1977 (source: Sport Auto n°182, March 1977), 5 stages in South Pacific 1977 (source: Auto Hebdo n°63, 19–26 May 1977), 1 stage in Safari 1990 (source: Auto Hebdo n°723, 18 April 1990). Moreover, he is said to have won 11 special stages in Sanremo 1974 although reliable sources are missing as of now. Also, Markku Alén won 20 special stages in annulled Sanremo 1986 (source: Auto Hebdo n°545, 22 October 1986).)
4	(Spain) Carlos Sainz	757 (Note: According to World Rally Archive, Sainz won 756 stages. Sainz also won one special stage in Safari Rally 1991 (source: Auto Hebdo n°772, 4 April 1991), that is not yet taken into account by www.juwra.com.)
5	(Finland) Juha Kankkunen	700 (Note: Kankkunen also won 5 special stages in annulled Sanremo 1986 (source: Auto Hebdo n°545, 22 October 1986).)
6	(Finland) Hannu Mikkola	666 (Note: According to World Rally Archive, Mikkola won 654 stages. Mikkola also won special stages in the following rallies that are not yet taken into account by www.juwra.com : 1 stage in Acropolis 1976 (source: Sport Auto n°174, July 1976, and Auto Hebdo), 1 stage in Sweden 1977 (source: Sport Auto n°182, March 1977), 10 stages in Acropolis 1977 (source: Auto Hebdo n°66, 9–16 June 1977, and Sport Auto n°186, July 1977).)
7	(Finland) Ari Vatanen	590 (Note: According to World Rally Archive, Vatanen won 542 stages. Vatanen also won at least 46 special stages in South Pacific 1977. He actually won a 47th special stage in this rally but it is unclear whether the results of this stage were annulled or not (source: Auto Hebdo n° 63, 19–26 May 1977).)
8	(France) Didier Auriol	554
9	(Finland) Marcus Grönholm	542
10	(Finland) Jari-Matti Latvala	539

=== Statistics ===
Rallies
#	Driver	Total
1	(France) **Sébastien Ogier**	214
2	(Finland) Jari-Matti Latvala	213
3	(Spain) Carlos Sainz	196
4	(Spain) **Dani Sordo**	193
5	(Norway) Petter Solberg	190
6	(France) Sébastien Loeb	184
7	(Belgium) **Thierry Neuville**	181
8	(Estonia) Ott Tänak	176
9	(Finland) Mikko Hirvonen	163
10	(Finland) Juha Kankkunen	162

Podiums
#	Driver	Total
1	(France) **Sébastien Ogier**	121
2	(France) Sébastien Loeb	120
3	(Spain) Carlos Sainz	97
4	(Belgium) **Thierry Neuville**	76
5	(Finland) Juha Kankkunen	75
6	(Finland) Mikko Hirvonen	69
7	(Finland) Jari-Matti Latvala	67
8	(Finland) Marcus Grönholm	61
9	(Spain) **Dani Sordo**	58
9	(Estonia) Ott Tänak	58
11	(Finland) Markku Alen	56

Points
#	Driver	Total
1	(France) **Sébastien Ogier**	3440
2	(Belgium) **Thierry Neuville**	2430
3	(United Kingdom) **Elfyn Evans**	1906
4	(Estonia) Ott Tänak	1898
5	(France) Sébastien Loeb	1778
6	(Finland) Jari-Matti Latvala	1689
7	(Spain) **Dani Sordo**	1423
8	(Spain) Carlos Sainz	1242
9	(Finland) Mikko Hirvonen	1210
10	(Finland) Juha Kankkunen	1140

Retirements
#	Driver	Total
1	(Finland) Hannu Mikkola	61
2	(United Kingdom) Colin McRae	60
3	(Finland) Tommi Mäkinen	56
4	(France) Didier Auriol	55
5	(Finland) Ari Vatanen	54
6	(Finland) Marcus Grönholm	53
7	(Sweden) Kenneth Eriksson	49
7	(Germany) Armin Schwarz	49
9	(Norway) Petter Solberg	47
10	(Spain) Carlos Sainz	46

Most rallies without a championship win
#	Driver	Total
1	(Finland) Jari-Matti Latvala	213
2	(Spain) **Dani Sordo**	193
3	(Finland) Mikko Hirvonen	163
4	(Czech Republic) Martin Prokop	145
5	(Norway) Henning Solberg	133

Most rallies without an event win
#	Driver	Total
1	(Czech Republic) Martin Prokop	145
2	(Norway) Henning Solberg	133
3	(Austria) Manfred Stohl	126
4	(Finland) Toni Gardemeister	112
5	(Uruguay) Gustavo Trelles	101

Most rallies without a podium
#	Driver	Total
1	(Czech Republic) Martin Prokop	145
2	(United Kingdom) Gus Greensmith	98
3	(United Kingdom) Matthew Wilson	92
4	(Japan) Toshi Arai	86
5	(United Kingdom) Alister McRae	78

Most podiums without a championship win
#	Driver	Total
1	(Finland) Mikko Hirvonen	69
2	(Finland) Jari-Matti Latvala	67
3	(Spain) **Dani Sordo**	58
4	(Norway) Andreas Mikkelsen	25
5	(Sweden) Kenneth Eriksson	21

Most podiums without an event win
#	Driver	Total
1	(France) **Adrien Fourmaux**	13
2	(Italy) Alex Fiorio	10
3	(Republic of Ireland) Craig Breen	9
4	(Finland) Rauno Aaltonen	6
4	(Australia) Chris Atkinson	6
4	(Italy) Attilio Bettega	6
4	(Finland) Toni Gardemeister	6
4	(Norway) Henning Solberg	6
4	(Austria) Manfred Stohl	6

Most event wins without a championship win
#	Driver	Total
1	(Finland) Jari-Matti Latvala	18
2	(Finland) Mikko Hirvonen	15
3	(France) Bernard Darniche	7
3	(France) Gilles Panizzi	7
5	(Sweden) Kenneth Eriksson	6

=== Age ===
Youngest winners
#	Driver	Age	Event
1	(Finland) Kalle Rovanperä	20 y, 289 d	2021 Rally Estonia
2	(Finland) Jari-Matti Latvala	22 y, 313 d	(Sweden) 2008 Swedish Rally
3	(Sweden) **Oliver Solberg**	23 y, 300 d	2025 Rally Estonia
4	(Finland) Henri Toivonen	24 y, 86 d	(United Kingdom) 1980 RAC Rally
5	(Finland) Markku Alén	24 y, 156 d	1975 Rally Portugal
6	(Norway) Mads Østberg	24 y, 173 d	2012 Rally Portugal
7	(Finland) **Sami Pajari**	24 y, 230 d	2026 Rally Estonia
8	(Belgium) François Duval	24 y, 359 d	2005 Rally Australia
9	(United Kingdom) Colin McRae	25 y, 2 d	1993 Rally New Zealand
10	(Finland) Timo Salonen	25 y, 345 d	(Canada) 1977 Critérium du Quebec

Oldest winners
#	Driver	Age	Event
1	(France) Sébastien Loeb	47 y, 331 d	(Monaco) 2022 Monte Carlo Rally
2	(Sweden) Björn Waldegård	46 y, 155 d	(Kenya) 1990 Safari Rally
3	(Finland) Hannu Mikkola	44 y, 331 d	(Kenya) 1987 Safari Rally
4	(Finland) Pentti Airikkala	44 y, 80 d	(United Kingdom) 1989 RAC Rally
5	(Kenya) Joginder Singh	44 y, 70 d	(Kenya) 1976 Safari Rally
6	(Japan) Kenjiro Shinozuka	44 y, 13 d	(Ivory Coast) 1992 Rallye Côte d'Ivoire
7	(France) Didier Auriol	42 y, 219 d	(Catalonia) 2001 Rally Catalunya
8	(France) **Sébastien Ogier**	42 y, 193 d	(Greece) 2026 Acropolis Rally
9	(Sweden) Ingvar Carlsson	42 y, 107 d	1989 Rally New Zealand
10	(Spain) Carlos Sainz	42 y, 98 d	2004 Rally Argentina

Youngest Drivers' Champion
#	Driver	Age	Year
1	(Finland) Kalle Rovanperä	22 y, 1 d	2022 season
2	(United Kingdom) Colin McRae	27 y, 109 d	1995 season
3	(Finland) Juha Kankkunen	27 y, 249 d	1986 season
4	(Spain) Carlos Sainz	28 y, 189 d	1990 season
5	(Norway) Petter Solberg	28 y, 356 d	2003 season
6	(Finland) Ari Vatanen	29 y, 212 d	1981 season
7	(France) **Sébastien Ogier**	29 y, 294 d	2013 season
8	(France) Sébastien Loeb	30 y, 220 d	2004 season
9	(Italy) Miki Biasion	30 y, 280 d	1988 season
10	(United Kingdom) Richard Burns	30 y, 312 d	2001 season

Oldest Drivers' Champion
#	Driver	Age	Year
1	(France) **Sébastien Ogier**	41 y, 347 d	2025 season
2	(Finland) Hannu Mikkola	41 y, 183 d	1983 season
3	(France) Sébastien Loeb	38 y, 224 d	2012 season
4	(Sweden) Stig Blomqvist	38 y, 99 d	1984 season
5	(United Kingdom) **Elfyn Evans**	37 y, 280 d	2026 season
6	(Belgium) **Thierry Neuville**	36 y, 161 d	2024 season
7	(France) Didier Auriol	36 y, 97 d	1994 season
8	(Sweden) Björn Waldegård	36 y, 32 d	1979 season
9	(Germany) Walter Röhrl	35 y, 238 d	1982 season
10	(Finland) Tommi Mäkinen	35 y, 133 d	1999 season

== Manufacturers ==
Championships
#	Manufacturer	Total	Seasons
1	(Italy) Lancia	10	1974–1976, 1983, 1987–1992
1	(Japan) **Toyota**	10	1993–1994, 1999, 2018, 2021–2026
3	(France) Citroën	8	2003–2005, 2008–2012
4	(France) Peugeot	5	1985–1986, 2000–2002
5	(Germany) Volkswagen	4	2013–2016
5	(United Kingdom) Ford/**M-Sport**	4	1979, 2006–2007, 2017
7	(Italy) Fiat	3	1977–1978, 1980
7	(Japan) Subaru	3	1995–1997
9	(Germany) Audi	2	1982, 1984
9	(South Korea) **Hyundai**	2	2019–2020

Event wins
#	Manufacturer	Total
1	(Japan) **Toyota**	117
2	(France) Citroën	102
3	(United Kingdom) Ford/**M-Sport**	94
4	(Italy) Lancia	73 (Note: Lancia also won Rally Sanremo 1986, that was annulled by FISA and is therefore not counted as a WRC win.)
5	(France) Peugeot	48
6	(Japan) Subaru	47
7	(Germany) Volkswagen	44
8	(Japan) Mitsubishi	34
8	(South Korea) **Hyundai**	34
10	(Germany) Audi	24

Event wins by car
#	Car	Tyre	Total
1	(Japan) **Toyota GR Yaris Rally1**	**P** **H**	48
2	(Italy) Lancia Delta HF	**M** **P**	46
2	(Japan) Subaru Impreza	**P**	46
4	(United Kingdom) Ford Focus RS WRC	**P** **M** **BF**	44
5	(Germany) Volkswagen Polo R WRC	**M**	43
6	(Japan) Toyota Celica GT-Four	**P** **M**	37
7	(France) Citroën C4 WRC	**BF** **P**	36
8	(France) Citroën Xsara WRC	**M** **BF**	32
9	(United Kingdom) Ford Escort	**D** **G**	31
10	(Japan) Mitsubishi Lancer Evolution	**M**	26
10	(France) Citroën DS3 WRC	**M**	26
10	(Japan) Toyota Yaris WRC	**M** **P**	26

== Co-drivers ==
Event wins
#	Co-driver	Total
1	(Monaco) Daniel Elena	79
2	(France) Julien Ingrassia	54
3	(Finland) Timo Rautiainen	30
4	(Spain) Luis Moya	24
5	(Estonia) Martin Järveoja	22
6	(United Kingdom) Nicky Grist	21
7	(Finland) Seppo Harjanne	20
8	(Finland) Ilkka Kivimäki	19
9	(Finland) Miikka Anttila	18
9	(Sweden) Arne Hertz	18

Starts
#	Co-driver	Total
1	(Spain) Marc Martí	223
2	(Finland) Miikka Anttila	220
3	(United Kingdom) **Scott Martin**	214
4	(Sweden) Jonas Andersson	212
5	(France) Denis Giraudet	192
6	(Finland) Jarmo Lehtinen	182
7	(Monaco) Daniel Elena	180 (Note: Elena has one start in the WRC as a driver, which is not included.)
7	(Belgium) Stéphane Prévot	180
9	(France) Julien Ingrassia	169
10	(United Kingdom) Phil Mills	162 (Note: 164 by other sources)

Podiums
#	Co-driver	Total
1	(Monaco) Daniel Elena	119
2	(France) Julien Ingrassia	91
3	(Spain) Luis Moya	83
4	(Finland) Jarmo Lehtinen	71
5	(Finland) Miikka Anttila	67
6	(Finland) Timo Rautiainen	61
7	(Finland) Ilkka Kivimäki	54
7	(Estonia) Martin Järveoja	54
9	(Spain) Marc Martí	48
10	(United Kingdom) Scott Martin (co-driver)	46

== Rallies ==
=== Fastest rallies ===
#	Event	Average speed	Winner	Car
1	2025 Rally Finland	129.95 km/h (80.75 mph)	(Finland) Kalle Rovanperä	(Japan) Toyota GR Yaris Rally1
2	2026 Rally Finland	128.20 km/h (79.66 mph)	(Finland) Sami Pajari	(Japan) Toyota GR Yaris Rally1
3	2016 Rally Finland	126.62 km/h (78.68 mph)	(United Kingdom) Kris Meeke	(France) Citroën DS3 WRC
4	2017 Rally Finland	126.16 km/h (78.39 mph)	(Finland) **Esapekka Lappi**	(Japan) Toyota Yaris WRC
5	2024 Rally Finland	125.89 km/h (78.22 mph)	(France) **Sébastien Ogier**	(Japan) Toyota GR Yaris Rally1
6	2023 Rally Finland	125.56 km/h (78.02 mph)	(United Kingdom) **Elfyn Evans**	(Japan) Toyota GR Yaris Rally1
7	2015 Rally Finland	125.44 km/h (77.94 mph)	(Finland) Jari-Matti Latvala	(Germany) Volkswagen Polo R WRC
8	2022 Rally Finland	125.32 km/h (77.87 mph)	(Estonia) Ott Tänak	(South Korea) Hyundai i20 N Rally1
9	2020 Rally Sweden	124.28 km/h (77.22 mph)	(United Kingdom) **Elfyn Evans**	(Japan) Toyota Yaris WRC
10	2023 Rally Sweden	123.85 km/h (76.96 mph)	(Estonia) Ott Tänak	(United Kingdom) Ford Puma Rally1

=== Slowest rallies ===
#	Event	Average speed	Winner	Car
1	(Italy) 1973 Sanremo Rally	44.15 km/h (27.43 mph)	(France) Jean-Luc Therier	(France) Renault-Alpine A110 1800
2	(Italy) 1974 Rallye Sanremo	45.16 km/h (28.06 mph)	(Italy) Sandro Munari	(Italy) Lancia Stratos HF
3	(Sweden) 1977 Swedish Rally	58.72 km/h (36.49 mph)	(Sweden) Stig Blomqvist	(Sweden) Saab 99EMS
4	(Greece) 1975 Acropolis Rally	62.08 km/h (38.57 mph)	(Germany) Walter Rohrl	(Germany) Opel Ascona
5	2000 Cyprus Rally	64.11 km/h (39.84 mph)	(Spain) Carlos Sainz	(United Kingdom) Ford Focus WRC 00
6	2005 Cyprus Rally	64.80 km/h (40.26 mph)	(France) Sebastian Loeb	(France) Citroen Xsara WRC
7	2004 Cyprus Rally	65.60 km/h (40.76 mph)	(France) Sebastian Loeb	(France) Citroen Xsara WRC
8	2003 Cyprus Rally	66.18 km/h (41.12 mph)	(Norway) Petter Solberg	(Japan) Subaru Impreza WRC 2003
9	2001 Cyprus Rally	66.60 km/h (41.38 mph)	(United Kingdom) Colin McRae	(United Kingdom) Ford Focus WRC 01
10	(France) 1980 Tour de Corse	66.81 km/h (41.51 mph)	(France) Jean-Luc Therier	(Germany) Porsche 911

=== Closest wins ===
#	Event	Margin (Note: Includes only timed stage rallies. The World Rally Championship has in the past also featured endurance events where "unachievable" target times were assigned to the stages, and competitors received a penalty point for each minute their stage time was over the target time. At the 1973 Safari Rally, Shekhar Mehta and Harry Källström finished with the same amount of penalty minutes (6 hours and 46 minutes), and at the 1985 Rallye Côte d'Ivoire, Toyota teammates Juha Kankkunen and Björn Waldegård had the same amount of penalty minutes (4 hours and 46 minutes). Mehta and Kankkunen took the wins by tiebreakers.)	Winner	Runner-up
1	2011 Jordan Rally	0.2 second	(France) **Sébastien Ogier**	(Finland) Jari-Matti Latvala
1	(Italy) 2024 Rally Italia Sardegna	0.2 second	(Estonia) Ott Tänak	(France) **Sébastien Ogier**
3	2007 Rally New Zealand	0.3 second	(Finland) Marcus Grönholm	(France) Sébastien Loeb
4	2021 Croatia Rally	0.6 second	(France) **Sébastien Ogier**	(United Kingdom) **Elfyn Evans**
5	2017 Rally Argentina	0.7 second	(Belgium) **Thierry Neuville**	(United Kingdom) **Elfyn Evans**
5	(Italy) 2018 Rally Italia Sardegna	0.7 second	(Belgium) **Thierry Neuville**	(France) **Sébastien Ogier**
7	1998 Rally Portugal	2.1 seconds	(United Kingdom) Colin McRae	(Spain) Carlos Sainz
8	(Monaco) 2019 Monte Carlo Rally	2.2 seconds	(France) **Sébastien Ogier**	(Belgium) **Thierry Neuville**
9	1999 Rally Argentina	2.4 seconds	(Finland) Juha Kankkunen	(United Kingdom) Richard Burns
9	2010 Rally New Zealand	2.4 seconds	(Finland) Jari-Matti Latvala	(France) **Sébastien Ogier**
9	2011 Rally Argentina	2.4 seconds	(France) Sébastien Loeb	(Finland) Mikko Hirvonen

== Nationalities ==
=== Championships by driver's country ===
Updated after the 2025 season.

Rank	Nation	Gold	Silver	Bronze	Total
1	France	19	6	7	32
2	Finland	16	15	18	49
3	Great Britain	3	9	1	13
4	Italy	3	2	1	6
5	Spain	2	4	7	13
6	Sweden	2	3	2	7
7	Germany	2	1	1	4
8	Belgium	1	5	3	9
9	Norway	1	3	4	8
10	Estonia	1	1	5	7
Totals (10 entries)		**50**	**49**	**49**	**148**

=== Drivers ===
Championships
#	Country	Drivers	Total
1	France	3	19
2	Finland (Note: Markku Alén's 1978 FIA Cup for Drivers title is not included.)	7	15
3	United Kingdom	3	3
4	Germany	1	2
4	Italy (Note: Sandro Munari's 1977 FIA Cup for Drivers title is not included.)	1	2
4	Spain	1	2
4	Sweden	2	2
8	Norway	1	1
8	Estonia	1	1
8	Belgium	1	1

Event wins
#	Country	Wins
1	France	216
2	Finland	201
3	United Kingdom	54
4	Sweden	47
5	Italy	30
5	Spain	30
7	Estonia	27
8	Belgium	24
9	Germany	17
9	Norway	17

=== Driver wins per nationalities ===
#	Nation	Wins	Drivers	N°
1	France	216	Sébastien Loeb (80), **Sébastien Ogier** (69), Didier Auriol (20), Bernard Darniche (7), Gilles Panizzi (7), Jean-Luc Thérier (5), Jean-Pierre Nicolas (5), Michèle Mouton (4), François Delecour (4), Jean-Claude Andruet (3), Jean Ragnotti (3), Bruno Saby (2), Philippe Bugalski (2), Guy Fréquelin (1), Bernard Béguin (1), Alain Ambrosino (1), Alain Oreille (1), Patrick Tauziac (1)	18
2	Finland	201	Marcus Grönholm (30), Tommi Mäkinen (24), Juha Kankkunen (23), Markku Alén (19), Hannu Mikkola (18), Jari-Matti Latvala (18), Kalle Rovanperä (18), Mikko Hirvonen (15), Timo Salonen (11), Ari Vatanen (10), Timo Mäkinen (4), Henri Toivonen (3), **Sami Pajari** (3), **Esapekka Lappi** (2), Kyösti Hämäläinen (1), Pentti Airikkala (1), Harri Rovanperä (1)	17
3	United Kingdom	54	Colin McRae (25), **Elfyn Evans** (13), Richard Burns (10), Kris Meeke (5), Roger Clark (1)	5
4	Sweden	47	Björn Waldegård (16), Stig Blomqvist (11), Kenneth Eriksson (6), **Oliver Solberg** (4), Ingvar Carlsson (2), Mikael Ericsson (2), Mats Jonsson (2), Ove Andersson (1), Per Eklund (1), Harry Källström (1), Anders Kulläng (1)	11
5	Italy	30	Miki Biasion (17), Sandro Munari (7), Raffaele Pinto (1), Fulvio Bacchelli (1), Antonio Fassina (1), Andrea Aghini (1), Gianfranco Cunico (1), Piero Liatti (1)	8
5	Spain	30	Carlos Sainz (26), **Dani Sordo** (3), Jesús Puras (1)	3
7	Estonia	27	Ott Tänak (22), Markko Märtin (5)	2
8	Belgium	24	**Thierry Neuville** (23), François Duval (1)	2
9	Germany	17	Walter Röhrl (14), Achim Warmbold (2), Armin Schwarz (1)	3
9	Norway	17	Petter Solberg (13), Andreas Mikkelsen (3), Mads Østberg (1)	3
11	Kenya	8	Shekhar Mehta (5), Joginder Singh (2), Ian Duncan (1)	3
12	Japan	4	Kenjiro Shinozuka (2), **Takamoto Katsuta** (2)	2
13	Austria	2	Franz Wittmann, Sr. (1), Josef Haider (1)	2
14	Argentina	1	Jorge Recalde (1)	1
14	Canada	1	Walter Boyce (1)	1
14	New Zealand	1	**Hayden Paddon** (1)	1
14	Portugal	1	Joaquim Moutinho (1)	1

=== Co-drivers ===
Event wins
#	Country	Wins
1	Finland	153
2	France	133
3	United Kingdom	90
4	Monaco	79
5	Sweden	56
6	Italy	34
7	Spain	30
8	Belgium	25
9	Estonia	22
10	Germany	15

== See also ==
- Power Stage (Power Stage statistics)
- List of World Rally Championship Drivers' champions
- List of World Rally Championship Co-Drivers' champions
- List of World Rally Championship Manufacturers' champions
- List of World Rally Championship event winners
