= Carlos Sainz =

Carlos Sainz may refer to:

== People ==
- Carlos Sainz Sr. (born 1962), Spanish rally driver world champion, father of Jr.
- Carlos Sainz Jr. (born 1994), Spanish Formula One driver, son of Sr.

== Other uses ==
- Carlos Sainz: World Rally Championship, 1990 videogame

== See also ==
- Sainz (surname)
- Carlos (disambiguation)
