= Sanz (disambiguation) =

Sanz is a Hasidic dynasty originating in the city of Sanz in Galicia.

Sanz may also refer to:

- Nowy Sącz or Sanz, a town in Poland
- Sanz (Hof I, III, IV, V, VI, VII), part of Groß Kiesow, Germany
- Sanz (surname)
- Sanz (album), a 2021 album released by Alejandro Sanz

== See also ==
- Kiryat Sanz (disambiguation)
