= Sainz =

Sainz is a surname. Notable people with the surname include:

- Adolfo Fernández Sainz (born 1947), Cuban journalist
- Alberto Sainz (born 1937), Argentine association football player
- Bernard Sainz (born 1943), French unlicensed sports doctor, convicted for administering doping
- Borja Sainz (born 2001), Spanish association football player
- Carlos Sainz (born 1962), Spanish rally driver
- Carlos Sainz Jr. (born 1994), Spanish racing driver, son of Carlos Sainz
- Casimiro Sainz (1853–1898), Spanish painter
- Enrique Sáinz (1917–1999), Spanish field hockey player
- Faustino Sainz Muñoz (born 1937), Spanish prelate of the Roman Catholic Church
- Gustavo Sainz (born 1940), Mexican writer
- Inés Sainz (born 1978), Mexican journalist
- Inés Sáinz Esteban, Spanish beauty pageant
- Joana Sainz García (1989–2019), Spanish singer, dancer, and songwriter who was killed onstage by a faulty pyrotechnic
- José Sáinz Nothnagel (1907–1984), Spanish right-wing activist and politician
- Karina Sainz Borgo (born 1982), Venezuelan journalist and writer
- Lolo Sainz (born 1940), Spanish former basketball player and coach
- Lucía Sainz (born 1984), Spanish tennis and padel player
- Luis Sáinz Hinojosa (born 1936), Bolivian prelate of the Catholic Church
- Pablo Sáinz Villegas (born 1977), Spanish classical guitarist
- Pedro Sainz Rodríguez (1897–1986), Spanish writer, philologist, publisher and politician
- Regino Sainz de la Maza (1896–1981), Spanish classical guitarist
- Renato Sáinz (1899–1982), Bolivian association football player
- Severiano Sainz y Bencamo (1871–1937), the second Bishop of the Roman Catholic Diocese of Matanzas (1915–1937)
- Steven Sainz (born 1994), US politician, Republican member of the Georgia House of Representatives
- Tina Sainz (born 1945), Spanish actress

== See also ==
- Sanz (disambiguation)
