= 2022 Monte Carlo Rally =

90th edition of Rallye Automobile Monte-Carlo

2022 Monte Carlo Rally 90^{e} Rallye Automobile Monte-Carlo
Round 1 of 13 in the 2022 World Rally Championship
Next event →
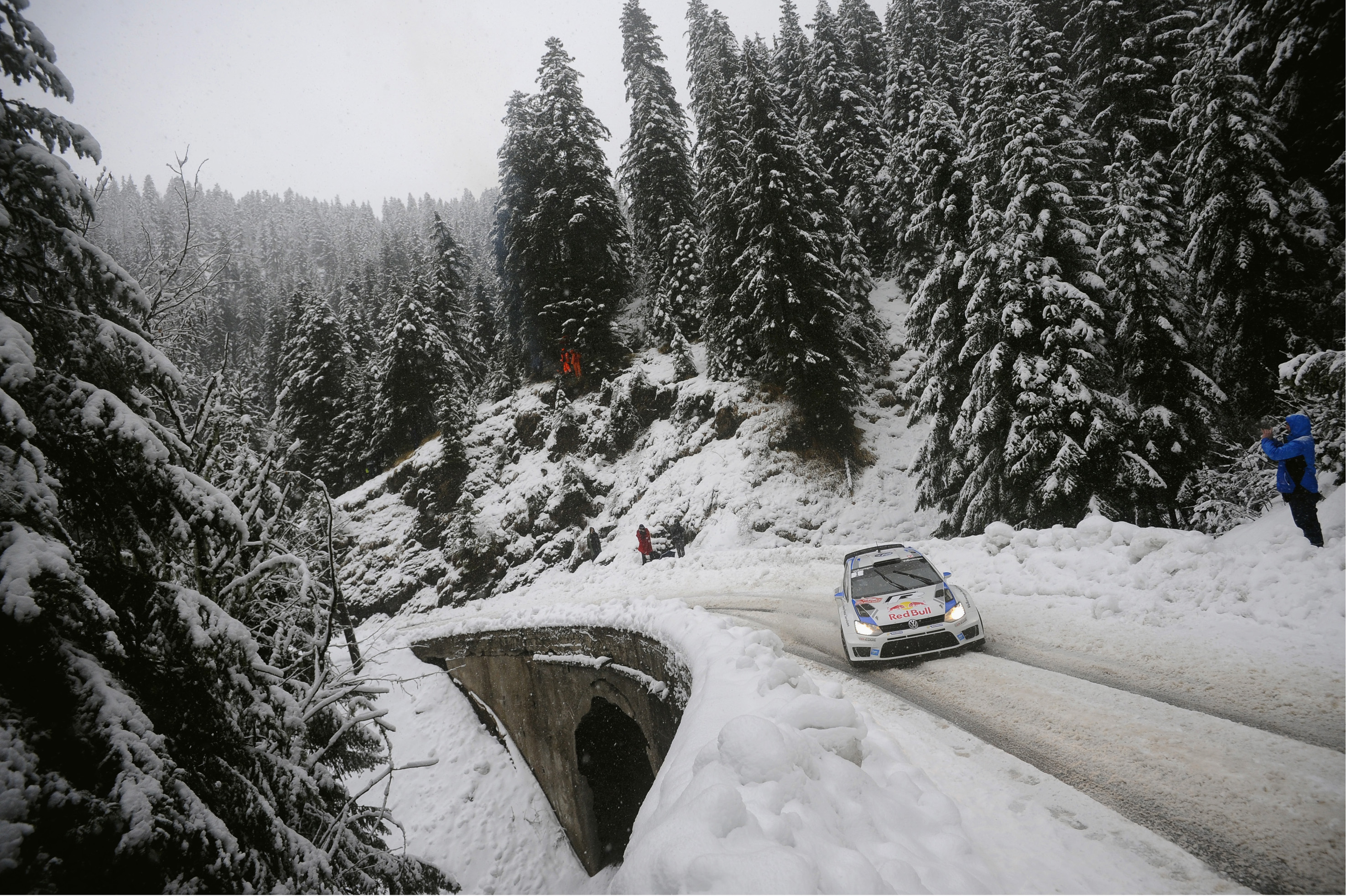
- The Monte Carlo Rally is run on a mixture of tarmac and snow stages.
- Host country: Monaco (Note: Although the rally was run in France, the Fédération Internationale de l'Automobile does not consider France to be the host nation.)
- Rally base: Monte Carlo, Monaco
- Dates run: 20 – 23 January 2022
- Start location: Quai Albert, Monaco
- Finish location: Casino Square, Monaco
- Stages: 17 (296.03 km; 183.94 miles)
- Stage surface: Tarmac and snow
- Transport distance: 1,216.44 km (755.86 miles)
- Overall distance: 1,511.47 km (939.18 miles)

Statistics
- Crews registered: 74
- Crews: 74 at start, 62 at finish

Overall results
- Overall winner: (France) Sébastien Loeb (France) Isabelle Galmiche (United Kingdom) M-Sport Ford WRT; 3:00:32.8
- Power Stage winner: (Finland) Kalle Rovanperä (Finland) Jonne Halttunen (Japan) Toyota Gazoo Racing WRT; 8:35.8

Support category results
- WRC-2 winner: (Norway) Andreas Mikkelsen (Norway) Torstein Eriksen (Germany) Toksport WRT; 3:12:06.6
- WRC-3 winner: (Finland) Sami Pajari (Finland) Enni Mälkönen (Finland) Sami Pajari; 3:24:39.2

The 2022 Monte Carlo Rally (also known as the 90^{e} Rallye Automobile Monte-Carlo) was a motor racing event for rally cars that was held over four days between 20 and 23 January 2022. It marked the ninetieth running of the Monte Carlo Rally, and was the first round of the 2022 World Rally Championship, World Rally Championship-2 and World Rally Championship-3. The 2022 event was based in Monaco solely. The rally was consisted of seventeen special stages, covering a total competitive distance of 296.03 km (183.94 mi).

Sébastien Ogier and Julien Ingrassia were the defending rally winners. However, Ingrassia did not defend his title as he retired from the sport at the end of 2021 season. Andreas Mikkelsen and Ola Fløene were the defending rally winners in the WRC-2 category, while Yohan Rossel and Benoît Fulcrand were the defending rally winners in the WRC-3 category.

Nine-time world champion Sébastien Loeb and Isabelle Galmiche won the rally. This was Loeb's eightieth rally victory and his first since the 2018 Rally Catalunya. The win also saw Loeb became the oldest driver to win a World Rally Championship event and Galmiche became the first female winner of a WRC fixture since 1997. Their team, M-Sport Ford WRT, won its first rally since the 2018 Wales Rally GB. Mikkelsen successfully defended his title in the WRC-2 category with new co-driver Torstein Eriksen. The Finnish crew of Sami Pajari and Enni Mälkönen won the WRC-3 category.

== Background ==
=== Entry list ===
The following crews entered into the rally. The event was opened to crews competing in the World Rally Championship, its support categories, the World Rally Championship-2 and World Rally Championship-3, and privateer entries that were not registered to score points in any championship. Eleven crews were entered under Rally1 regulations, as were twenty-one Rally2 crews in the World Rally Championship-2 and four Rally3 crews in the World Rally Championship-3.

Rally1 entries competing in the World Rally Championship
No.	Driver	Co-Driver	Entrant	Car	Championship eligibility	Tyre
1	(France) Sébastien Ogier	(France) Benjamin Veillas	(Japan) Toyota Gazoo Racing WRT	Toyota GR Yaris Rally1	Driver, Co-driver, Manufacturer	P
2	(Sweden) Oliver Solberg	(United Kingdom) Elliott Edmondson	(South Korea) Hyundai Shell Mobis WRT	Hyundai i20 N Rally1	Driver, Co-driver, Manufacturer	P
8	(Estonia) Ott Tänak	(Estonia) Martin Järveoja	(South Korea) Hyundai Shell Mobis WRT	Hyundai i20 N Rally1	Driver, Co-driver, Manufacturer	P
11	(Belgium) Thierry Neuville	(Belgium) Martijn Wydaeghe	(South Korea) Hyundai Shell Mobis WRT	Hyundai i20 N Rally1	Driver, Co-driver, Manufacturer	P
16	(France) Adrien Fourmaux	(France) Alexandre Coria	(United Kingdom) M-Sport Ford WRT	Ford Puma Rally1	Driver, Co-driver, Manufacturer	P
18	(Japan) Takamoto Katsuta	(Republic of Ireland) Aaron Johnston	(Japan) Toyota Gazoo Racing WRT NG	Toyota GR Yaris Rally1	Driver, Co-driver, Manufacturer/Team	P
19	(France) Sébastien Loeb	(France) Isabelle Galmiche	(United Kingdom) M-Sport Ford WRT	Ford Puma Rally1	Driver, Co-driver, Manufacturer	P
33	(United Kingdom) Elfyn Evans	(United Kingdom) Scott Martin	(Japan) Toyota Gazoo Racing WRT	Toyota GR Yaris Rally1	Driver, Co-driver, Manufacturer	P
42	(Republic of Ireland) Craig Breen	(Republic of Ireland) Paul Nagle	(United Kingdom) M-Sport Ford WRT	Ford Puma Rally1	Driver, Co-driver, Manufacturer	P
44	(United Kingdom) Gus Greensmith	(Sweden) Jonas Andersson	(United Kingdom) M-Sport Ford WRT	Ford Puma Rally1	Driver, Co-driver	P
69	(Finland) Kalle Rovanperä	(Finland) Jonne Halttunen	(Japan) Toyota Gazoo Racing WRT	Toyota GR Yaris Rally1	Driver, Co-driver, Manufacturer	P

Rally2 entries competing in the World Rally Championship-2
No.	Driver	Co-Driver	Entrant	Car	Championship eligibility	Tyre
20	(Norway) Andreas Mikkelsen	(Norway) Torstein Eriksen	(Germany) Toksport WRT	Škoda Fabia Rally2 evo	Driver, Co-driver, Team	P
21	(Bolivia) Marco Bulacia	(Argentina) Marcelo Der Ohannesian	(Germany) Toksport WRT	Škoda Fabia Rally2 evo	Junior Driver, Co-driver, Team	P
22	Nikolay Gryazin (Note: Nikolay Gryazin is Russian, but he competes as a neutral competitor using the designation RAF (Russian Automobile Federation), as the Court of Arbitration for Sport upheld a ban on Russia competing at World Championships. The ban was implemented by the World Anti-Doping Agency in response to state-sponsored doping program of Russian athletes.)	Konstantin Aleksandrov (Note: Konstantin Aleksandrov is Russian, but he competes as a neutral competitor using the designation RAF (Russian Automobile Federation), as the Court of Arbitration for Sport upheld a ban on Russia competing at World Championships. The ban was implemented by the World Anti-Doping Agency in response to state-sponsored doping program of Russian athletes.)	(Germany) Toksport WRT 2	Škoda Fabia Rally2 evo	Junior Driver, Co-driver	P
23	(France) Yohan Rossel	(France) Benjamin Boulloud	(France) PH Sport	Citroën C3 Rally2	Driver, Co-driver	P
24	(France) Eric Camilli	(France) Yannick Roche	(France) Saintéloc Junior Team	Citroën C3 Rally2	Driver, Co-driver, Team	P
25	(United Kingdom) Chris Ingram	(United Kingdom) Ross Whittock	(United Kingdom) Chris Ingram	Škoda Fabia Rally2 evo	Junior Driver, Co-driver	P
26	(United States) Sean Johnston	(United States) Alexander Kihurani	(France) Saintéloc Junior Team	Citroën C3 Rally2	Driver, Co-driver, Team	P
27	(Czech Republic) Erik Cais	(Czech Republic) Petr Těšínský	(Czech Republic) Yacco ACCR Team	Ford Fiesta Rally2	Junior Driver, Co-driver, Team	P
28	(Luxembourg) Grégoire Munster	(Belgium) Louis Louka	(Luxembourg) Grégoire Munster	Hyundai i20 N Rally2	Junior Driver, Junior Co-driver	P
29	(Austria) Johannes Keferböck	(Austria) Ilka Minor	(Austria) Johannes Keferböck	Škoda Fabia Rally2 evo	Driver, Co-driver	P
30	(Belgium) Freddy Loix	(Belgium) Pieter Tsjoen	(Belgium) Freddy Loix	Škoda Fabia Rally2 evo	Masters Driver, Co-driver	P
31	(Switzerland) Olivier Burri	(France) Anderson Levratti	(Switzerland) Olivier Burri	Volkswagen Polo GTI R5	Masters Driver, Co-driver	P
32	(France) Pierre Ragues	(France) Julien Pesenti	(Czech Republic) Yacco ACCR Team	Volkswagen Polo GTI R5	Driver, Co-driver, Team	P
34	(Italy) Mauro Miele	(Italy) Luca Beltrame	(Italy) Mauro Miele	Škoda Fabia Rally2 evo	Masters Driver, Co-driver	P
35	(Republic of Ireland) Eamonn Boland	(Republic of Ireland) Michael Joseph Morrissey	(Republic of Ireland) Eamonn Boland	Ford Fiesta R5	Masters Driver, Masters Co-driver	P
36	(France) Frédéric Rosati	(France) Philippe Marchetto	(France) Frédéric Rosati	Hyundai i20 N Rally2	Masters Driver, Masters Co-driver	P
37	(France) Jean-Michel Raoux	(France) Laurent Magat	(France) Jean-Michel Raoux	Volkswagen Polo GTI R5	Masters Driver, Masters Co-driver	P
38	(Italy) Maurizio Morato	(Italy) Enrico Gallinaro	(Italy) Maurizio Morato	Škoda Fabia Rally2 evo	Driver, Co-Driver	—N/a
39	(Italy) Carlo Covi	(Italy) Michela Lorigiola	(Italy) Carlo Covi	Škoda Fabia R5	Masters Driver, Masters Co-driver	P
40	(Italy) Fabrizio Arengi	(Italy) Massimiliano Bosi	(Italy) Fabrizio Arengi	Škoda Fabia Rally2 evo	Masters Driver, Co-driver	P
54	(France) Stéphane Lefebvre	(France) Andy Malfoy	(Belgium) DG Sport Compétition	Citroën C3 Rally2	Driver, Co-driver	P

Rally3 entries competing in the World Rally Championship-3
No.	Driver	Co-Driver	Entrant	Car	Championship eligibility	Tyre
41	(Finland) Sami Pajari	(Finland) Enni Mälkönen	(Finland) Sami Pajari	Ford Fiesta Rally3	Open	P
43	(Italy) Enrico Brazzoli	(Italy) Manuel Fenoli	(Italy) Enrico Brazzoli	Ford Fiesta Rally3	Open	P
45	(Czech Republic) Jan Černý	(Czech Republic) Petr Černohorský	(Czech Republic) Jan Černý	Ford Fiesta Rally3	Open	P
64	(Hungary) Zoltán László	(Hungary) Tamás Begala	(Hungary) Zoltán László	Ford Fiesta Rally3	Open	P

=== Itinerary ===
All dates and times are CET (UTC+1).

Date	Time	No.	Stage name	Distance
20 January	09:31	—	Sainte-Agnès – Peille [Shakedown]	2.29 km
20 January	20:18	SS1	Lucéram – Lantosque	15.20 km
20 January	21:31	SS2	La Bollène-Vésubie – Moulinet	23.25 km
21 January	09:14	SS3	Roure – Beuil 1	18.33 km
21 January	10:17	SS4	Guillaumes – Péone – Valberg 1	13.49 km
21 January	11:35	SS5	Val-de-Chalvagne – Entrevaux 1	17.11 km
21 January	14:16	SS6	Roure – Beuil 2	18.33 km
21 January	15:19	SS7	Guillaumes – Péone – Valberg 2	13.49 km
21 January	16:37	SS8	Val-de-Chalvagne – Entrevaux 2	17.11 km
22 January	08:17	SS9	Le Fugeret – Thorame-Haute	16.80 km
22 January	10:08	SS10	Saint-Jeannet – Malijai 1	17.04 km
22 January	11:16	SS11	Saint-Geniez – Thoard 1	20.79 km
22 January	14:08	SS12	Saint-Jeannet – Malijai 2	17.04 km
22 January	15:16	SS13	Saint-Geniez – Thoard 2	20.79 km
23 January	08:45	SS14	La Penne – Collongues 1	19.37 km
23 January	10:08	SS15	Briançonnet – Entrevaux 1	14.26 km
23 January	10:53	SS16	La Penne – Collongues 2	19.37 km
23 January	12:18	SS17	Briançonnet – Entrevaux 2 [Power Stage]	14.26 km

== Report ==
=== WRC Rally1 ===
==== Classification ====
Position		No.	Driver	Co-driver	Entrant	Car	Time	Difference	Points	
Event	Class	No.	Driver	Co-driver	Entrant	Car	Time	Difference	Event	Stage
1	1	19	Sébastien Loeb	Isabelle Galmiche	M-Sport Ford WRT	Ford Puma Rally1	3:00:32.8	0.0	25	2
2	2	1	Sébastien Ogier	Benjamin Veillas	Toyota Gazoo Racing WRT	Toyota GR Yaris Rally1	3:00:43.3	+10.5	18	1
3	3	42	Craig Breen	Paul Nagle	M-Sport Ford WRT	Ford Puma Rally1	3:02:12.6	+1:39.8	15	0
4	4	69	Kalle Rovanperä	Jonne Halttunen	Toyota Gazoo Racing WRT	Toyota GR Yaris Rally1	3:02:49.0	+2:16.2	12	5
5	5	44	Gus Greensmith	Jonas Andersson	M-Sport Ford WRT	Ford Puma Rally1	3:07:06.2	+6:33.4	10	0
6	6	11	Thierry Neuville	Martijn Wydaeghe	Hyundai Shell Mobis WRT	Hyundai i20 N Rally1	3:08:15.4	+7:42.6	8	3
8	7	18	Takamoto Katsuta	Aaron Johnston	Toyota Gazoo Racing WRT NG	Toyota GR Yaris Rally1	3:12:57.5	+12:24.7	4	0
21	8	33	Elfyn Evans	Scott Martin	Toyota Gazoo Racing WRT	Toyota GR Yaris Rally1	3:23:43.3	+23:10.5	0	4
Retired SS15		2	Oliver Solberg	Elliott Edmondson	Hyundai Shell Mobis WRT	Hyundai i20 N Rally1	Medical		0	0
Retired SS12		8	Ott Tänak	Martin Järveoja	Hyundai Shell Mobis WRT	Hyundai i20 N Rally1	Accident damage		0	0
Retired SS3		16	Adrien Fourmaux	Alexandre Coria	M-Sport Ford WRT	Ford Puma Rally1	Crash		0	0

==== Special stages ====
Stage	Winners	Car	Time	Class leaders
SD	Ogier / Veillas	Toyota GR Yaris Rally1	1:50.4	—N/a
SS1	Ogier / Veillas	Toyota GR Yaris Rally1	10:34.0	Ogier / Veillas
SS2	Ogier / Veillas	Toyota GR Yaris Rally1	15.14.4	Ogier / Veillas
SS3	Loeb / Galmiche	Ford Puma Rally1	10:08.9	Ogier / Veillas
SS4	Loeb / Galmiche	Ford Puma Rally1	7:40.1	Ogier / Veillas
SS5	Loeb / Galmiche	Ford Puma Rally1	10:56.8	Loeb / Galmiche
SS6	Loeb / Galmiche	Ford Puma Rally1	9:57.2	Loeb / Galmiche
SS7	Greensmith / Andersson	Ford Puma Rally1	7:31.9	Loeb / Galmiche
SS8	Ogier / Veillas	Toyota GR Yaris Rally1	10:31.6	Loeb / Galmiche
SS9	Evans / Martin	Toyota GR Yaris Rally1	9:12.8	Loeb / Galmiche
SS10	Ogier / Veillas	Toyota GR Yaris Rally1	9:26.4	Loeb / Galmiche; Ogier / Veillas
SS11	Ogier / Veillas	Toyota GR Yaris Rally1	14:17.1	Ogier / Veillas
SS12	Rovanperä / Halttunen	Toyota GR Yaris Rally1	9:23.8	Ogier / Veillas
SS13	Rovanperä / Halttunen	Toyota GR Yaris Rally1	14:14.6	Ogier / Veillas
SS14	Loeb / Galmiche	Ford Puma Rally1	11:27.9	Ogier / Veillas
SS15	Neuville / Wydaeghe	Hyundai i20 N Rally1	8:50.4	Ogier / Veillas
SS16	Loeb / Galmiche	Ford Puma Rally1	11:21.0	Loeb / Galmiche
SS17	Rovanperä / Halttunen	Toyota GR Yaris Rally1	8:35.8	Loeb / Galmiche

==== Championship standings ====
Pos.	Drivers' championships			Co-drivers' championships			Manufacturers' championships		
Pos.	Move	Driver	Points	Move	Co-driver	Points	Move	Manufacturer	Points
1	New entry	Sébastien Loeb	27	New entry	Isabelle Galmiche	27	New entry	M-Sport Ford WRT	42
2	New entry	Sébastien Ogier	19	New entry	Benjamin Veillas	19	New entry	Toyota Gazoo Racing WRT	39
3	New entry	Kalle Rovanperä	17	New entry	Jonne Halttunen	17	New entry	Hyundai Shell Mobis WRT	13
4	New entry	Craig Breen	15	New entry	Paul Nagle	15	New entry	Toyota Gazoo Racing WRT NG	8
5	New entry	Thierry Neuville	11	New entry	Martijn Wydaeghe	11			

=== WRC-2 Rally2 ===
==== Classification ====
Position		No.	Driver	Co-driver	Entrant	Car	Time	Difference	Points		
Event	Class	No.	Driver	Co-driver	Entrant	Car	Time	Difference	Class	Stage	Event
7	1	20	Andreas Mikkelsen	Torstein Eriksen	Toksport WRT	Škoda Fabia Rally2 evo	3:12:06.6	0.0	25	1	6
9	2	27	Erik Cais	Petr Těšínský	Yacco ACCR Team	Ford Fiesta Rally2	3:13:02.0	+55.4	18	0	2
10	3	22	Nikolay Gryazin	Konstantin Aleksandrov	Toksport WRT 2	Škoda Fabia Rally2 evo	3:14:14.1	+2:07.5	15	0	1
11	4	26	Sean Johnston	Alexander Kihurani	Saintéloc Junior Team	Citroën C3 Rally2	3:15:15.3	+3:08.7	12	0	0
12	5	28	Grégoire Munster	Louis Louka	Grégoire Munster	Hyundai i20 N Rally2	3:15:20.8	+3:14.2	10	2	0
13	6	23	Yohan Rossel	Benjamin Boulloud	PH Sport	Citroën C3 Rally2	3:15:34.9	+3:28.3	8	3	0
14	7	25	Chris Ingram	Ross Whittock	Chris Ingram	Škoda Fabia Rally2 evo	3:15:53.2	+3:46.6	6	0	0
17	8	34	Mauro Miele	Luca Beltrame	Mauro Miele	Škoda Fabia Rally2 evo	3:21:05.3	+8:58.7	4	0	0
20	9	31	Olivier Burri	Anderson Levratti	Olivier Burri	Volkswagen Polo GTI R5	3:23:25.8	+11:19.2	2	0	0
24	10	30	Freddy Loix	Pieter Tsjoen	Freddy Loix	Škoda Fabia Rally2 evo	3:25:05.1	+12:58.5	1	0	0
26	11	29	Johannes Keferböck	Ilka Minor	Johannes Keferböck	Škoda Fabia Rally2 evo	3:26:00.8	+13:54.2	0	0	0
30	12	37	Jean-Michel Raoux	Laurent Magat	Jean-Michel Raoux	Volkswagen Polo GTI R5	3:30:41.7	+18:35.1	0	0	0
31	13	35	Eamonn Boland	Michael Joseph Morrissey	Eamonn Boland	Ford Fiesta R5	3:31:59.6	+19:53.0	0	0	0
37	14	40	Fabrizio Arengi	Massimiliano Bosi	Fabrizio Arengi	Škoda Fabia Rally2 evo	3:40:32.3	+28:25.7	0	0	0
38	15	36	Frédéric Rosati	Philippe Marchetto	Frédéric Rosati	Hyundai i20 N Rally2	3:41:07.4	+29:00.8	0	0	0
54	16	32	Pierre Ragues	Julien Pesenti	Yacco ACCR Team	Volkswagen Polo GTI R5	4:10:49.2	+58:42.6	0	0	0
56	17	39	Carlo Covi	Michela Lorigiola	Carlo Covi	Škoda Fabia R5	4:14:52.2	+1:02:45.6	0	0	0
Retired SS13		21	Marco Bulacia	Marcelo Der Ohannesian	Toksport WRT	Škoda Fabia Rally2 evo	Mechanical		0	0	0
Retired SS11		54	Stéphane Lefebvre	Andy Malfoy	DG Sport Compétition	Citroën C3 Rally2	Accident damage		0	0	0
Retired SS6		24	Eric Camilli	Yannick Roche	Saintéloc Junior Team	Citroën C3 Rally2	Suspension		0	0	0

==== Special stages ====
Stage	Open Championship				Junior Championship				Masters Cup			
Stage	Winners	Car	Time	Class leaders	Winners	Car	Time	Class leaders	Winners	Car	Time	Class leaders
SS1	Camilli / Roche	Citroën C3 Rally2	11:00.3	Camilli / Roche	Gryazin / Aleksandrov	Škoda Fabia Rally2 evo	11:05.4	Gryazin / Aleksandrov	Miele / Beltrame	Škoda Fabia Rally2 evo	11:42.2	Miele / Beltrame
SS2	Camilli / Roche	Citroën C3 Rally2	15:54.3	Camilli / Roche	Bulacia / Der Ohannesian	Škoda Fabia Rally2 evo	16:11.9	Bulacia / Der Ohannesian	Miele / Beltrame	Škoda Fabia Rally2 evo	16:44.2	Miele / Beltrame
SS3	Lefebvre / Malfoy	Citroën C3 Rally2	10:44.9	Camilli / Roche	Gryazin / Aleksandrov	Škoda Fabia Rally2 evo	10:47.2	Bulacia / Der Ohannesian	Miele / Beltrame	Škoda Fabia Rally2 evo	11:14.8	Miele / Beltrame
SS4	Mikkelsen / Eriksen	Škoda Fabia Rally2 evo	8:05.0	Camilli / Roche	Gryazin / Aleksandrov	Škoda Fabia Rally2 evo	8:08.6	Bulacia / Der Ohannesian	Miele / Beltrame	Škoda Fabia Rally2 evo	8:28.7	Miele / Beltrame
SS5	Lefebvre / Malfoy	Citroën C3 Rally2	11:20.6	Mikkelsen / Eriksen	Munster / Louka	Hyundai i20 N Rally2	11:42.6	Bulacia / Der Ohannesian	Miele / Beltrame	Škoda Fabia Rally2 evo	12:18.8	Miele / Beltrame
SS6	Rossel / Boulloud	Citroën C3 Rally2	10:33.4	Mikkelsen / Eriksen	Gryazin / Aleksandrov	Škoda Fabia Rally2 evo	10:35.6	Bulacia / Der Ohannesian	Loix / Tsjoen	Škoda Fabia Rally2 evo	10:59.7	Miele / Beltrame
SS7	Rossel / Boulloud	Citroën C3 Rally2	7:55.9	Mikkelsen / Eriksen	Gryazin / Aleksandrov	Škoda Fabia Rally2 evo	7:57.5	Bulacia / Der Ohannesian	Loix / Tsjoen	Škoda Fabia Rally2 evo	8:17.0	Miele / Beltrame
SS8	Lefebvre / Malfoy	Citroën C3 Rally2	11:05.3	Mikkelsen / Eriksen	Gryazin / Aleksandrov	Škoda Fabia Rally2 evo	11:19.7	Bulacia / Der Ohannesian	Loix / Tsjoen	Škoda Fabia Rally2 evo	11:51.0	Miele / Beltrame
SS9	Rossel / Boulloud	Citroën C3 Rally2	9:44.9	Mikkelsen / Eriksen	Bulacia / Der Ohannesian	Škoda Fabia Rally2 evo	9:50.9	Bulacia / Der Ohannesian	Miele / Beltrame	Škoda Fabia Rally2 evo	10:28.1	Miele / Beltrame
SS10	Mikkelsen / Eriksen	Škoda Fabia Rally2 evo	10:04.7	Mikkelsen / Eriksen	Cais / Těšínský	Ford Fiesta Rally2	10.07.5	Bulacia / Der Ohannesian	Loix / Tsjoen	Škoda Fabia Rally2 evo	10:58.4	Miele / Beltrame
SS11	Stage cancelled											
SS12	Gryazin / Aleksandrov	Škoda Fabia Rally2 evo	9:58.8	Mikkelsen / Eriksen	Gryazin / Aleksandrov	Škoda Fabia Rally2 evo	9:58.8	Cais / Těšínský	Loix / Tsjoen	Škoda Fabia Rally2 evo	10:33.7	Miele / Beltrame
SS13	Cais / Těšínský	Ford Fiesta Rally2	15:16.1	Mikkelsen / Eriksen	Cais / Těšínský	Ford Fiesta Rally2	15:16.1	Cais / Těšínský	Burri / Levratti	Volkswagen Polo GTI R5	16:37.7	Miele / Beltrame
SS14	Mikkelsen / Eriksen	Škoda Fabia Rally2 evo	12:01.8	Mikkelsen / Eriksen	Munster / Louka	Hyundai i20 N Rally2	12:08.9	Cais / Těšínský	Loix / Tsjoen	Škoda Fabia Rally2 evo	12:49.3	Miele / Beltrame
SS15	Gryazin / Aleksandrov	Škoda Fabia Rally2 evo	9:21.3	Mikkelsen / Eriksen	Gryazin / Aleksandrov	Škoda Fabia Rally2 evo	9:21.3	Cais / Těšínský	Miele / Beltrame	Škoda Fabia Rally2 evo	9:57.4	Miele / Beltrame
SS16	Mikkelsen / Eriksen	Škoda Fabia Rally2 evo	12:03.5	Mikkelsen / Eriksen	Ingram / Whittock	Škoda Fabia Rally2 evo	12:03.6	Cais / Těšínský	Miele / Beltrame	Škoda Fabia Rally2 evo	12:38.3	Miele / Beltrame
SS17	Rossel / Boulloud	Citroën C3 Rally2	9:11.0	Mikkelsen / Eriksen	Munster / Louka	Hyundai i20 N Rally2	9:12.7	Cais / Těšínský	Burri / Levratti	Volkswagen Polo GTI R5	9:49.9	Miele / Beltrame

==== Championship standings ====
Pos.	Open Drivers' championships			Open Co-drivers' championships			Teams' championships			Junior Drivers' championships			Junior Co-drivers' championships			Driver Masters' championships			Co-driver Masters' championships		
Pos.	Move	Driver	Points	Move	Co-driver	Points	Move	Manufacturer	Points	Move	Manufacturer	Points	Move	Driver	Points	Move	Driver	Points	Move	Driver	Points
1	New entry	Andreas Mikkelsen	26	New entry	Torstein Eriksen	26	New entry	Yaco ACCR Team	30	New entry	Erik Cais	25	New entry	Louis Louka	25	New entry	Mauro Miele	25	New entry	Laurent Magat	25
2	New entry	Erik Cais	18	New entry	Petr Těšínský	18	New entry	Toksport WRT	30	New entry	Nikolay Gryazin	18				New entry	Olivier Burri	18	New entry	Michael Joseph Morrissey	18
3	New entry	Nikolay Gryazin	15	New entry	Konstantin Aleksandrov	15	New entry	Saintéloc Junior Team	15	New entry	Grégoire Munster	15				New entry	Freddy Loix	15	New entry	Philippe Marchetto	15
4	New entry	Sean Johnston	12	New entry	Alex Kihurani	12				New entry	Chris Ingram	12				New entry	Jean-Michel Raoux	12	New entry	Michela Lorigiola	12
5	New entry	Grégoire Munster	12	New entry	Louis Louka	12										New entry	Eamonn Boland	10			

=== WRC-3 Rally3 ===
==== Classification ====
Position		No.	Driver	Co-driver	Entrant	Car	Time	Difference	Points
Event	Class	No.	Driver	Co-driver	Entrant	Car	Time	Difference	Open
22	1	41	Sami Pajari	Enni Mälkönen	Sami Pajari	Ford Fiesta Rally3	3:24:39.2	0.0	25
23	2	45	Jan Černý	Petr Černohorský	Jan Černý	Ford Fiesta Rally3	3:24:46.8	+7.6	18
3	3	43	Enrico Brazzoli	Manuel Fenoli	Enrico Brazzoli	Ford Fiesta Rally3	3:43:55.2	+19:16.0	15
Retired SS13		64	Zoltán László	Tamás Begala	Zoltán László	Ford Fiesta Rally3	Withdrawn		0

==== Special stages ====
Stage	Open Championship			
Stage	Winners	Car	Time	Class leaders
SS1	Černý / Černohorský	Ford Fiesta Rally3	12:24.8	Černý / Černohorský
SS2	Černý / Černohorský	Ford Fiesta Rally3	17:42.0	Černý / Černohorský
SS3	Pajari / Mälkönen	Ford Fiesta Rally3	11:27.0	Černý / Černohorský
SS4	Pajari / Mälkönen	Ford Fiesta Rally3	8:33.3	Černý / Černohorský
SS5	Černý / Černohorský	Ford Fiesta Rally3	12:18.0	Černý / Černohorský
SS6	Pajari / Mälkönen	Ford Fiesta Rally3	11:13.1	Černý / Černohorský
SS7	Pajari / Mälkönen	Ford Fiesta Rally3	8:21.8	Černý / Černohorský
SS8	Černý / Černohorský	Ford Fiesta Rally3	12:38.7	Černý / Černohorský
SS9	Černý / Černohorský	Ford Fiesta Rally3	10:25.9	Černý / Černohorský
SS10	Pajari / Mälkönen	Ford Fiesta Rally3	10:31.7	Černý / Černohorský
SS11	Stage cancelled			
SS12	Pajari / Mälkönen	Ford Fiesta Rally3	10:21.5	Pajari / Mälkönen
SS13	Černý / Černohorský	Ford Fiesta Rally3	16:34.7	Pajari / Mälkönen
SS14	Pajari / Mälkönen	Ford Fiesta Rally3	12:47.6	Pajari / Mälkönen
SS15	Pajari / Mälkönen	Ford Fiesta Rally3	10:16.1	Pajari / Mälkönen
SS16	Pajari / Mälkönen	Ford Fiesta Rally3	12:45.8	Pajari / Mälkönen
SS17	Černý / Černohorský	Ford Fiesta Rally3	9:51.9	Pajari / Mälkönen

==== Championship standings ====
Pos.	Open Drivers' championships			Open Co-drivers' championships		
Pos.	Move	Driver	Points	Move	Co-driver	Points
1	New entry	Sami Pajari	25	New entry	Enni Mälkönen	25
2	New entry	Jan Černý	18	New entry	Petr Černohorský	18
3	New entry	Enrico Brazzoli	15	New entry	Manuel Fenoli	15

== Notes ==
Previous rally: 2021 Rally Monza (2021)	2022 FIA World Rally Championship	Next rally: 2022 Rally Sweden
Previous rally: 2021 Monte Carlo Rally	2022 Monte Carlo Rally	Next rally: 2023 Monte Carlo Rally
