= Kiryat Sanz =

Kiryat Sanz may refer to:

- Kiryat Sanz, Jerusalem, a neighborhood in northern Jerusalem, Israel
- Kiryat Sanz, Netanya, a neighborhood in northwestern Netanya, Israel, and the world center for Sanz Hasidism
