= List of World Rally Championship rally wins by Sébastien Loeb =

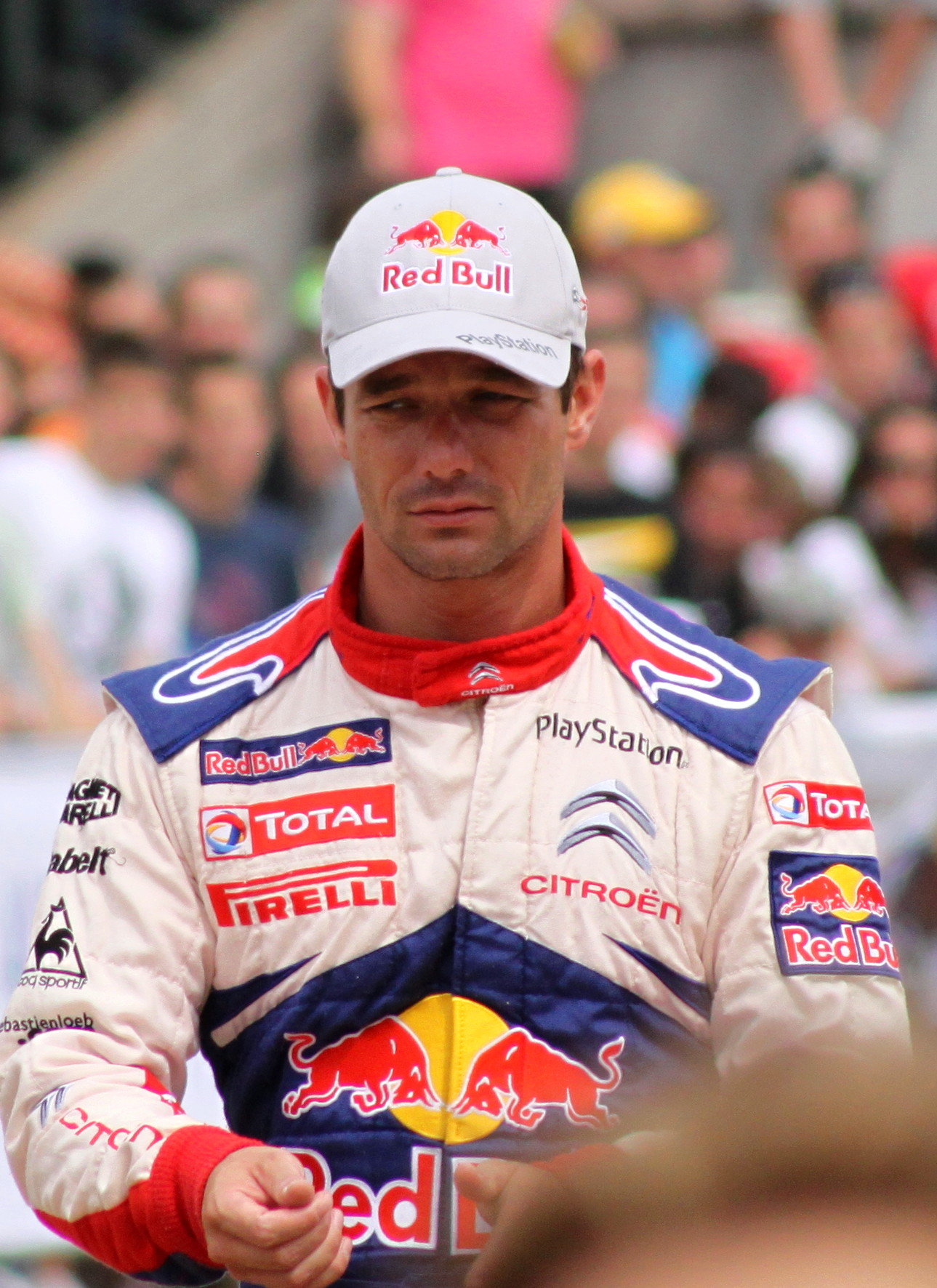
Sébastien Loeb in 2010.

Sébastien Loeb is a French rally driver and a nine-time champion of the World Rally Championship. With 80 rally wins in the World Rally Championship, Loeb is the most successful rally driver in the history of the championship, alongside his co-driver Daniel Elena. Competing in his native France in the early parts of his career, Loeb later contested the World Rally Championship with the French Federation of Automobile Sport, between 1999 and 2000. For 2001, Loeb joined Citroën and was a Junior World Rally Champion with the team.

During 2002, Loeb won his first event in the World Rally Championship, winning the 2002 Rallye Deutschland ahead of the then-defending World Champion Richard Burns. He continued with Citroën in 2003 and won three rallies en route to second place in the championship. From 2004 to 2012, he won a further 72 rallies along with nine championships while driving for Citroën, except in 2006 when he drove for Kronos Citroën while Citroën were developing their World Rally Car for 2007 under a break from the series as a constructor. For the 2013 season, Loeb announced he would step down from full time rallying and only compete in four selected events before retiring from the World Rally Championship in 2014. He would go on to win two of them, taking his total number of wins to 78. He returned to the World Rally Championship in 2015 with Citroën to drive a single event, while in 2018 he would drive a further three events with the team. In his last event of the 2018 season, the 2018 Rally Catalunya, he scored his latest win when he beat Sébastien Ogier to the win. Between 2019 and 2020, he drove selected events for Hyundai but scored no wins for the team.

Loeb holds several records in the World Rally Championship, in addition to his record 80 wins. He became the most successful driver when he won the 2006 Rally Japan, his 27th win. In 2005, he became the first, and so far only, driver to score six wins in a row, he would also repeat the same feat between the last event of 2008 and first five rallies of 2009. He is also the driver with most wins in the same season, winning eleven rallies in 2008. Loeb has won both Rallye Deutschland and Rally Catalunya nine times each, which is a record for most wins in the same rally. In total, Loeb has been victorious at 23 different rallies, which is also a record.

== Wins ==
Key:

- No. – Victory number; for example, "1" signifies Loeb's first rally win.
- Rally – Rally number in Loeb's World Rally Championship career; for example "25" signifies Loeb's 25th World Rally Championship rally.
- Stage surface – The surface, or surfaces if many, the stages of the rally took place on.
- Stage wins – The amount of stages won by Loeb during the event.
- Margin – Margin of victory, given in the format of minutes:seconds.milliseconds
- † – Driver's Championship winning season.

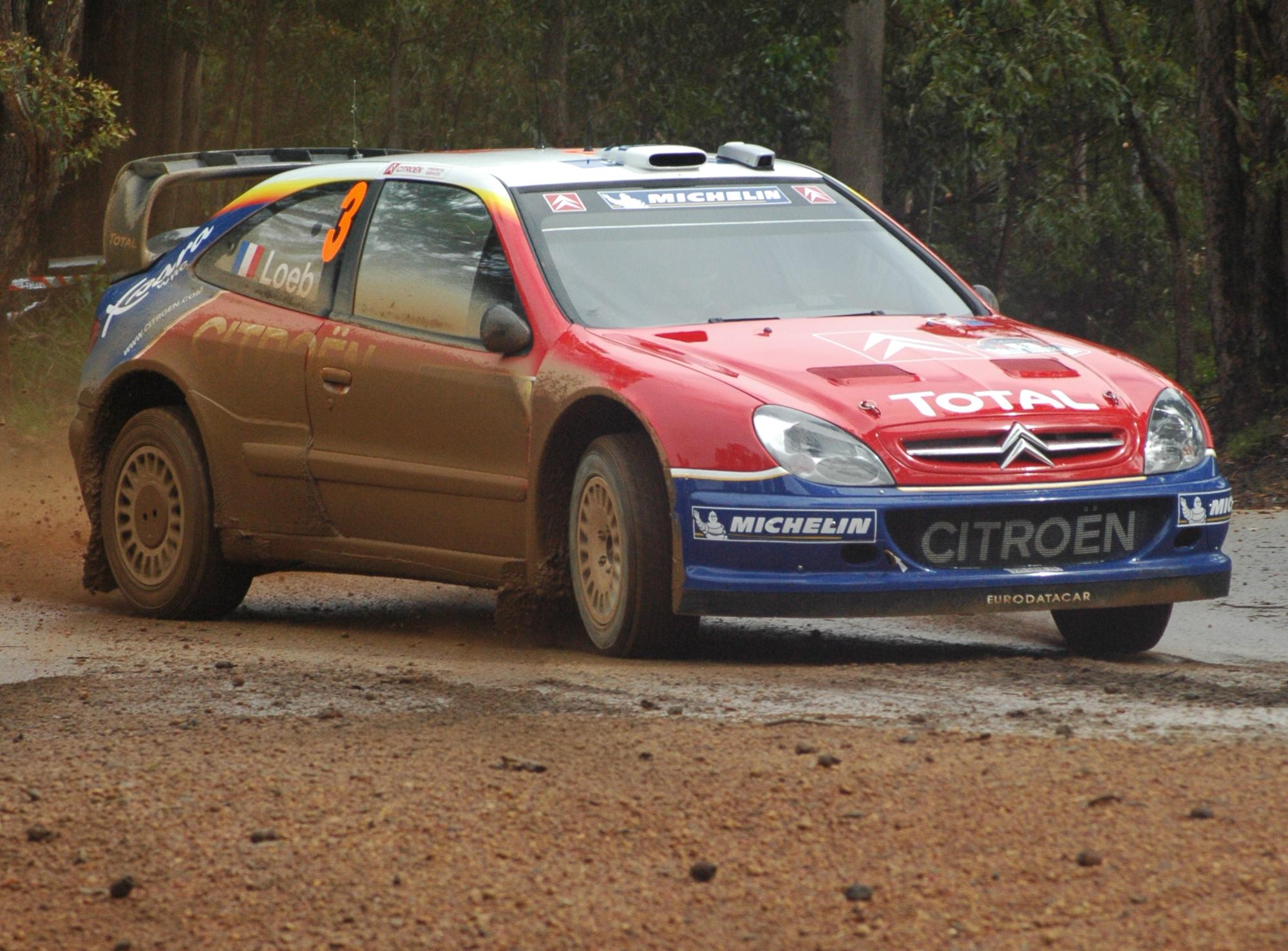
Loeb won the 2004 Rally Australia in a Citroën Xsara WRC.

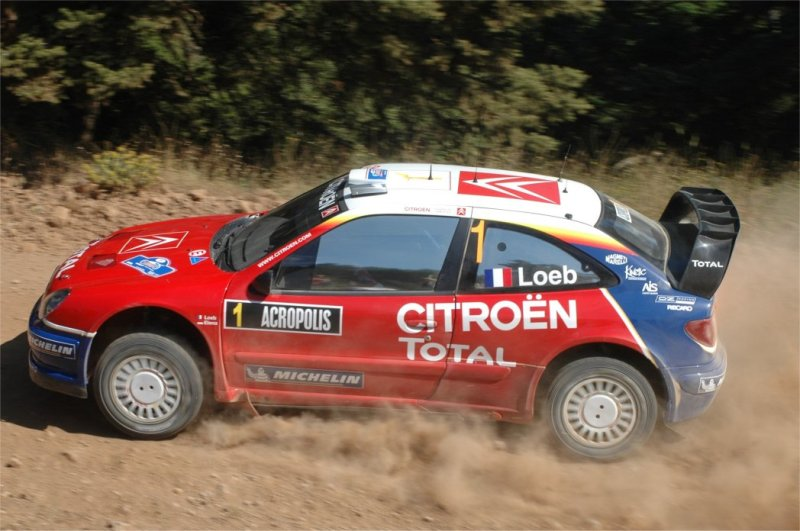
Loeb on a stage at the 2005 Acropolis Rally.

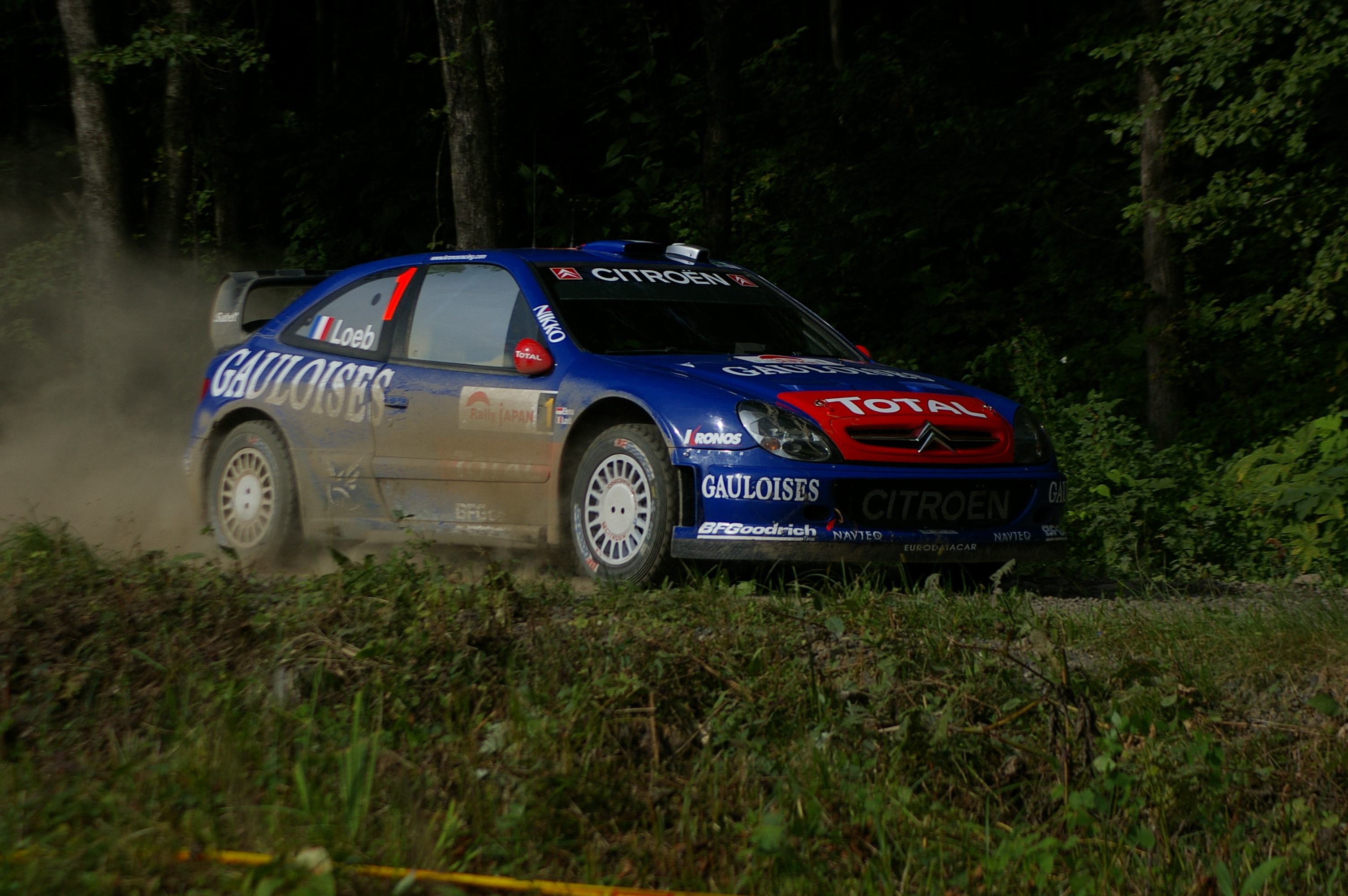
Loeb won his 27th event at the 2006 Rally Japan, becoming the most successful driver in the process.

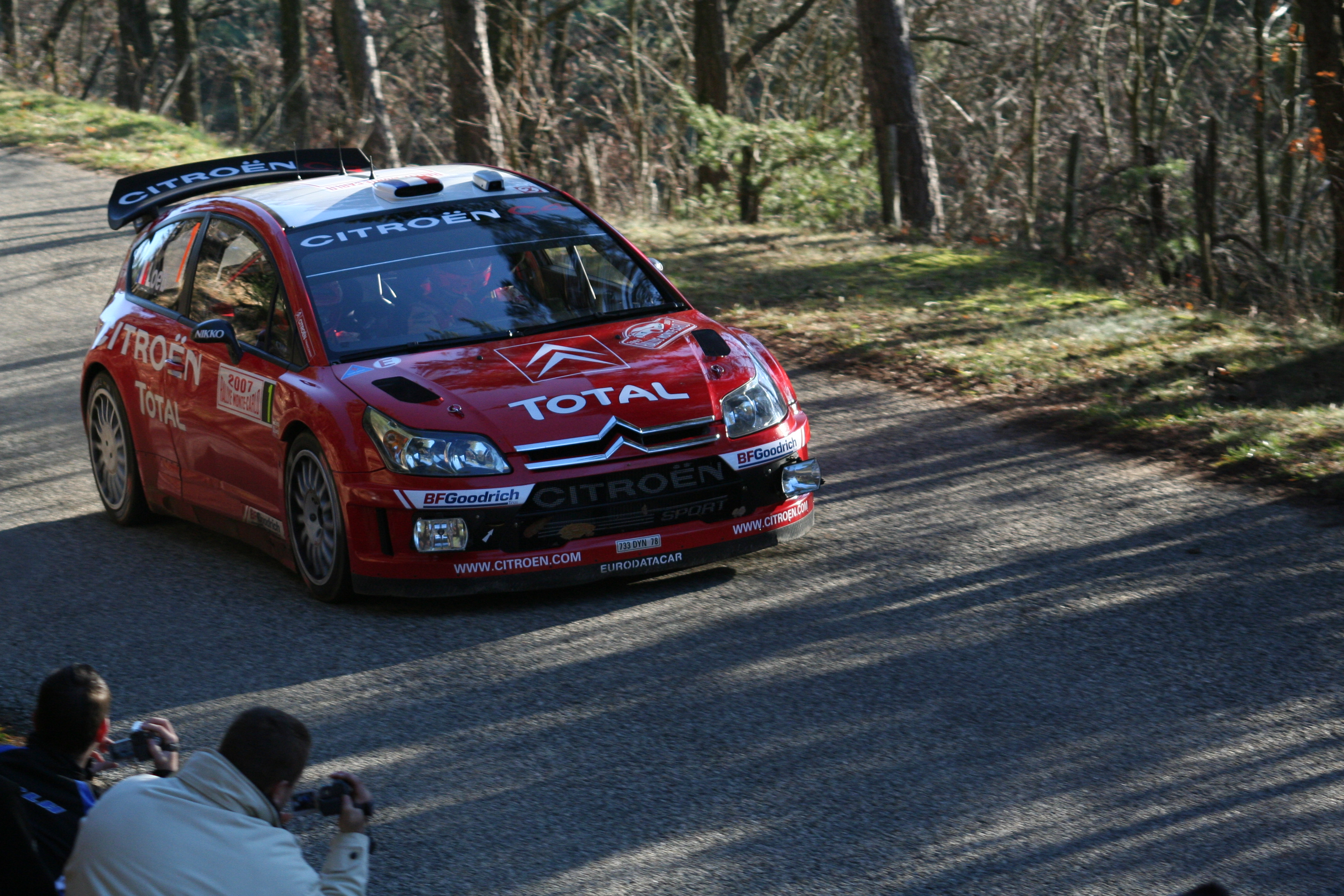
The Citroën C4 WRC made its debut in the hands of Loeb at the 2007 Monte Carlo Rally, with Loeb winning the event.

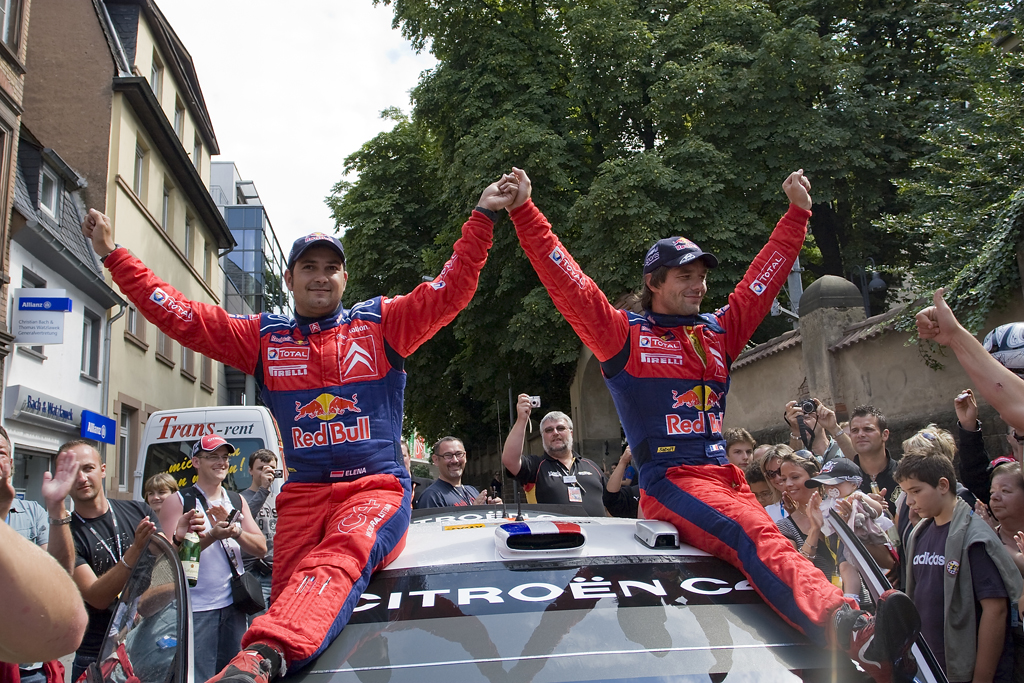
Loeb (right) and co-driver Elena (left) celebrate victory at the 2008 Rallye Deutschland.

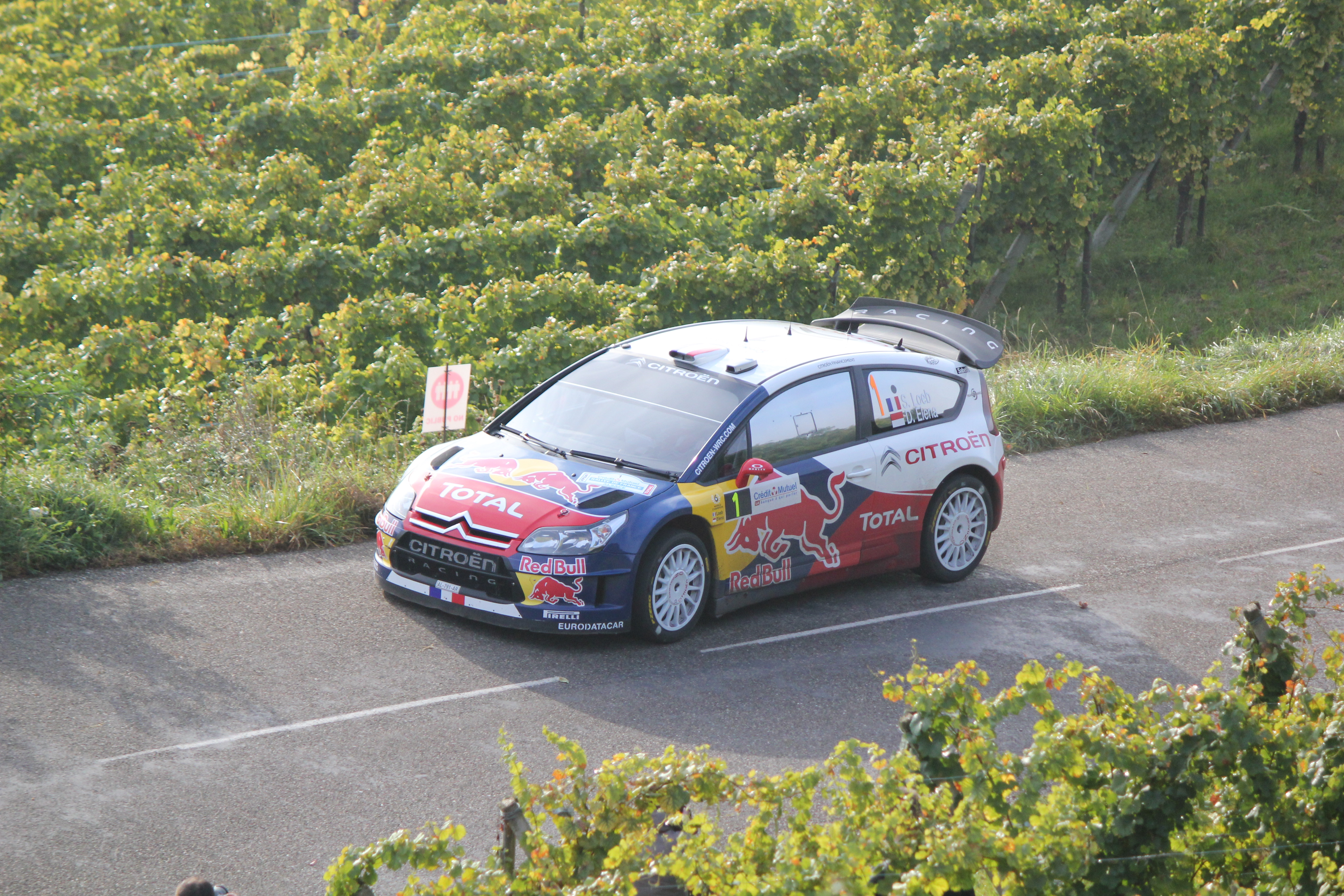
Loeb won the inaugural Rallye de France-Alsace in 2010.

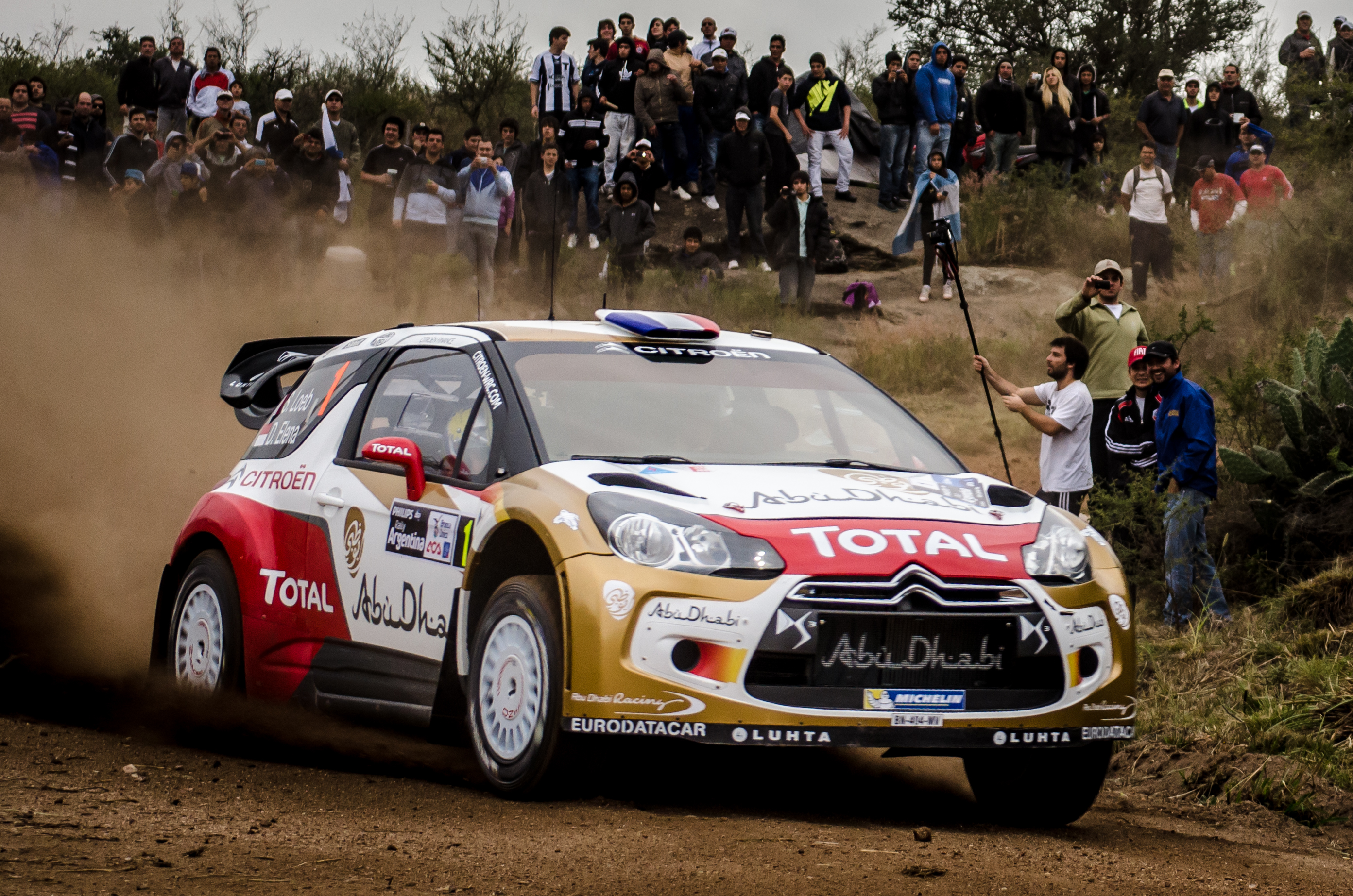
Loeb's win at the 2013 Rally Argentina (pictured) was his latest victory until he won the 2018 Rally Catalunya.

Rally victories
No.	Rally	Season	Event	Stage surface	Stage wins	Margin	Team	Car	Co-driver	Ref
1	22	2002	Rallye Deutschland	Asphalt	11	0:14.3	Citroën	Citroën Xsara WRC	Daniel Elena	
2	25	2003	Rally Monte Carlo	Asphalt and snow	5	0:38.1	Citroën	Citroën Xsara WRC	Daniel Elena	
3	32	2003	Rallye Deutschland	Asphalt	2	0:03.6	Citroën	Citroën Xsara WRC	Daniel Elena	
4	35	2003	Rallye Sanremo	Asphalt	5	0:28.3	Citroën	Citroën Xsara WRC	Daniel Elena	
5	39	2004^{†}	Rally Monte Carlo	Asphalt and snow	6	1:12.6	Citroën	Citroën Xsara WRC	Daniel Elena	
6	40	2004^{†}	Rally Sweden	Snow	4	0:46.4	Citroën	Citroën Xsara WRC	Daniel Elena	
7	43	2004^{†}	Cyprus Rally	Gravel	7	0:15.1	Citroën	Citroën Xsara WRC	Daniel Elena	
8	45	2004^{†}	Rally of Turkey	Gravel	6	0:26.2	Citroën	Citroën Xsara WRC	Daniel Elena	
9	48	2004^{†}	Rallye Deutschland	Asphalt	9	0:29.1	Citroën	Citroën Xsara WRC	Daniel Elena	
10	54	2004^{†}	Rally Australia	Gravel	8	1:55.1	Citroën	Citroën Xsara WRC	Daniel Elena	
11	55	2005^{†}	Rally Monte Carlo	Asphalt and snow	9	2:58.3	Citroën	Citroën Xsara WRC	Daniel Elena	
12	58	2005^{†}	Rally New Zealand	Gravel	8	0:49.8	Citroën	Citroën Xsara WRC	Daniel Elena	
13	59	2005^{†}	Rally Italia Sardegna	Gravel	8	0:59.6	Citroën	Citroën Xsara WRC	Daniel Elena	
14	60	2005^{†}	Cyprus Rally	Gravel	14	4:09.5	Citroën	Citroën Xsara WRC	Daniel Elena	
15	61	2005^{†}	Rally of Turkey	Gravel	10	0:59.6	Citroën	Citroën Xsara WRC	Daniel Elena	
16	62	2005^{†}	Acropolis Rally	Gravel	12	1:36.2	Citroën	Citroën Xsara WRC	Daniel Elena	
17	63	2005^{†}	Rally Argentina	Gravel	9	0:26.1	Citroën	Citroën Xsara WRC	Daniel Elena	
18	65	2005^{†}	Rallye Deutschland	Asphalt	13	0:37.4	Citroën	Citroën Xsara WRC	Daniel Elena	
19	68	2005^{†}	Tour de Corse	Asphalt	12	1:51.7	Citroën	Citroën Xsara WRC	Daniel Elena	
20	69	2005^{†}	Rally Catalunya	Asphalt	10	1:21.9	Citroën	Citroën Xsara WRC	Daniel Elena	
21	73	2006^{†}	Rally Mexico	Gravel	9	0:48.9	Kronos Citroën	Citroën Xsara WRC	Daniel Elena	
22	74	2006^{†}	Rally Catalunya	Asphalt	5	0:48.2	Kronos Citroën	Citroën Xsara WRC	Daniel Elena	
23	75	2006^{†}	Tour de Corse	Asphalt	6	0:29.0	Kronos Citroën	Citroën Xsara WRC	Daniel Elena	
24	76	2006^{†}	Rally Argentina	Gravel	5	0:44.6	Kronos Citroën	Citroën Xsara WRC	Daniel Elena	
25	77	2006^{†}	Rally Italia Sardegna	Gravel	8	2:41.4	Kronos Citroën	Citroën Xsara WRC	Daniel Elena	
26	79	2006^{†}	Rallye Deutschland	Asphalt	6	0:33.8	Kronos Citroën	Citroën Xsara WRC	Daniel Elena	
27	81	2006^{†}	Rally Japan	Gravel	11	0:05.6	Kronos Citroën	Citroën Xsara WRC	Daniel Elena	
28	82	2006^{†}	Cyprus Rally	Gravel	11	0:21.2	Kronos Citroën	Citroën Xsara WRC	Daniel Elena	
29	83	2007^{†}	Rally Monte Carlo	Asphalt and snow	6	0:38.2	Citroën	Citroën C4 WRC	Daniel Elena	
30	86	2007^{†}	Rally Mexico	Gravel	6	0:55.8	Citroën	Citroën C4 WRC	Daniel Elena	
31	87	2007^{†}	Rally de Portugal	Gravel	11	3:13.9	Citroën	Citroën C4 WRC	Daniel Elena	
32	88	2007^{†}	Rally Argentina	Gravel	10	0:36.7	Citroën	Citroën C4 WRC	Daniel Elena	
33	92	2007^{†}	Rallye Deutschland	Asphalt	5	0:20.3	Citroën	Citroën C4 WRC	Daniel Elena	
34	94	2007^{†}	Rally Catalunya	Asphalt	5	0:13.8	Citroën	Citroën C4 WRC	Daniel Elena	
35	95	2007^{†}	Tour de Corse	Asphalt	9	0:23.7	Citroën	Citroën C4 WRC	Daniel Elena	
36	97	2007^{†}	Rally Ireland	Asphalt	9	0:53.4	Citroën	Citroën C4 WRC	Daniel Elena	
37	99	2008^{†}	Rally Monte Carlo	Asphalt and snow	10	2:34.4	Citroën	Citroën C4 WRC	Daniel Elena	
38	101	2008^{†}	Rally Mexico	Gravel	8	1:06.1	Citroën	Citroën C4 WRC	Daniel Elena	
39	102	2008^{†}	Rally Argentina	Gravel	5	2:33.2	Citroën	Citroën C4 WRC	Daniel Elena	
40	104	2008^{†}	Rally Italia Sardegna	Gravel	4	0:10.6	Citroën	Citroën C4 WRC	Daniel Elena	
41	105	2008^{†}	Acropolis Rally	Gravel	4	1:09.5	Citroën	Citroën C4 WRC	Daniel Elena	
42	107	2008^{†}	Rally Finland	Gravel	15	0:09.0	Citroën	Citroën C4 WRC	Daniel Elena	
43	108	2008^{†}	Rallye Deutschland	Asphalt	14	0:47.7	Citroën	Citroën C4 WRC	Daniel Elena	
44	109	2008^{†}	Rally New Zealand	Gravel	6	0:17.5	Citroën	Citroën C4 WRC	Daniel Elena	
45	110	2008^{†}	Rally Catalunya	Asphalt	11	0:24.9	Citroën	Citroën C4 WRC	Daniel Elena	
46	111	2008^{†}	Tour de Corse	Asphalt	14	3:24.7	Citroën	Citroën C4 WRC	Daniel Elena	
47	113	2008^{†}	Wales Rally GB	Gravel	8	0:12.7	Citroën	Citroën C4 WRC	Daniel Elena	
48	114	2009^{†}	Rally Ireland	Asphalt	11	1:27.9	Citroën	Citroën C4 WRC	Daniel Elena	
49	115	2009^{†}	Rally Norway	Snow	9	0:09.8	Citroën	Citroën C4 WRC	Daniel Elena	
50	116	2009^{†}	Cyprus Rally	Gravel and asphalt	6	0:27.2	Citroën	Citroën C4 WRC	Daniel Elena	
51	117	2009^{†}	Rally de Portugal	Gravel	10	0:24.3	Citroën	Citroën C4 WRC	Daniel Elena	
52	118	2009^{†}	Rally Argentina	Gravel	12	1:13.1	Citroën	Citroën C4 WRC	Daniel Elena	
53	124	2009^{†}	Rally Catalunya	Asphalt	5	0:12.0	Citroën	Citroën C4 WRC	Daniel Elena	
54	125	2009^{†}	Wales Rally GB	Gravel	9	1:06.1	Citroën	Citroën C4 WRC	Daniel Elena	
55	127	2010^{†}	Rally Mexico	Gravel	8	0:24.2	Citroën	Citroën C4 WRC	Daniel Elena	
56	128	2010^{†}	Jordan Rally	Gravel	9	0:35.8	Citroën	Citroën C4 WRC	Daniel Elena	
57	129	2010^{†}	Rally of Turkey	Gravel and asphalt	7	0:54.5	Citroën	Citroën C4 WRC	Daniel Elena	
58	132	2010^{†}	Rally Bulgaria	Asphalt	5	0:29.5	Citroën	Citroën C4 WRC	Daniel Elena	
59	134	2010^{†}	Rallye Deutschland	Asphalt	9	0:29.5	Citroën	Citroën C4 WRC	Daniel Elena	
60	136	2010^{†}	Rallye de France–Alsace	Asphalt	7	0:35.7	Citroën	Citroën C4 WRC	Daniel Elena	
61	137	2010^{†}	Rally Catalunya	Asphalt and gravel	7	0:35.3	Citroën	Citroën C4 WRC	Daniel Elena	
62	138	2010^{†}	Wales Rally GB	Gravel	11	0:35.3	Citroën	Citroën C4 WRC	Daniel Elena	
63	140	2011^{†}	Rally Mexico	Gravel	9	1:38.4	Citroën	Citroën DS3 WRC	Daniel Elena	
64	143	2011^{†}	Rally Italia Sardegna	Gravel	4	0:11.2	Citroën	Citroën DS3 WRC	Daniel Elena	
65	144	2011^{†}	Rally Argentina	Gravel	8	0:02.4	Citroën	Citroën DS3 WRC	Daniel Elena	
66	146	2011^{†}	Rally Finland	Gravel	5	0:08.1	Citroën	Citroën DS3 WRC	Daniel Elena	
67	150	2011^{†}	Rally Catalunya	Asphalt and gravel	5	2:06.9	Citroën	Citroën DS3 WRC	Daniel Elena	
68	152	2012^{†}	Rally Monte Carlo	Asphalt and snow	9	2:45.5	Citroën	Citroën DS3 WRC	Daniel Elena	
69	154	2012^{†}	Rally Mexico	Gravel	7	0:42.4	Citroën	Citroën DS3 WRC	Daniel Elena	
70	156	2012^{†}	Rally Argentina	Gravel	4	0:15.2	Citroën	Citroën DS3 WRC	Daniel Elena	
71	157	2012^{†}	Acropolis Rally	Gravel	6	0:40.0	Citroën	Citroën DS3 WRC	Daniel Elena	
72	158	2012^{†}	Rally New Zealand	Gravel	7	0:29.6	Citroën	Citroën DS3 WRC	Daniel Elena	
73	159	2012^{†}	Rally Finland	Gravel	9	0:06.1	Citroën	Citroën DS3 WRC	Daniel Elena	
74	160	2012^{†}	Rallye Deutschland	Asphalt	9	2:00.0	Citroën	Citroën DS3 WRC	Daniel Elena	
75	162	2012^{†}	Rallye de France–Alsace	Asphalt	8	0:15.5	Citroën	Citroën DS3 WRC	Daniel Elena	
76	164	2012^{†}	Rally Catalunya	Asphalt and gravel	4	0:07.0	Citroën	Citroën DS3 WRC	Daniel Elena	
77	165	2013	Rally Monte Carlo	Asphalt and snow	8	1:39.9	Citroën	Citroën DS3 WRC	Daniel Elena	
78	167	2013	Rally Argentina	Gravel	2	0:55.0	Citroën	Citroën DS3 WRC	Daniel Elena	
79	172	2018	Rally Catalunya	Asphalt and gravel	3	0:02.9	Citroën	Citroën C3 WRC	Daniel Elena	
80	181	2022	Monte Carlo Rally	Asphalt and snow	6	0:10.5	M-Sport Ford WRT	Ford Puma Rally1	Isabelle Galmiche	

=== Number of wins at different rallies ===
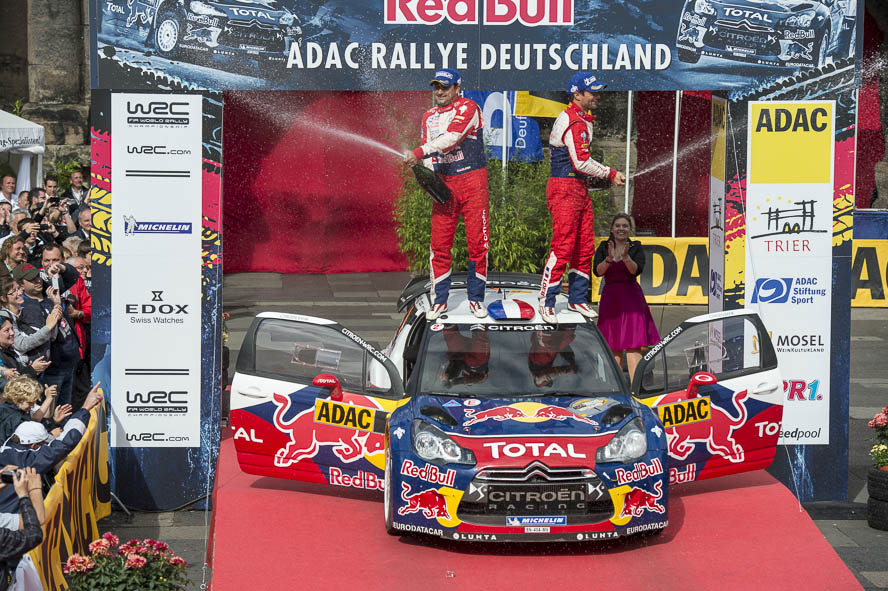
Loeb was often victorious at the Rallye Deutschland.

No.	Rally	Years won	Wins
1	Rally Catalunya	2005, 2006, 2007, 2008, 2009, 2010, 2011, 2012, 2018	9
2	Rallye Deutschland	2002, 2003, 2004, 2005, 2006, 2007, 2008, 2010, 2012	9
3	Rally Argentina	2005, 2006, 2007, 2008, 2009, 2011, 2012, 2013	8
4	Rally Monte Carlo	2003, 2004, 2005, 2007, 2008, 2012, 2013, 2022	8
5	Rally Mexico	2006, 2007, 2008, 2010, 2011, 2012	6
6	Cyprus Rally	2004, 2005, 2006, 2009	4
7	Rally Italia Sardegna	2005, 2006, 2008, 2011	4
8	Tour de Corse	2005, 2006, 2007, 2008	4
9	Acropolis Rally	2005, 2008, 2012	3
10	Rally Finland	2008, 2011, 2012	3
11	Rally New Zealand	2005, 2008, 2012	3
12	Rally of Turkey	2004, 2005, 2010	3
13	Wales Rally GB	2008, 2009, 2010	3
14	Rally Ireland	2007, 2009	2
15	Rally de Portugal	2007, 2009	2
16	Rallye de France–Alsace	2010, 2012	2
17	Jordan Rally	2010	1
18	Rally Australia	2004	1
19	Rally Bulgaria	2010	1
20	Rally Japan	2006	1
21	Rally Norway	2009	1
22	Rally Sweden	2004	1
23	Rallye Sanremo	2003	1

== Notes ==
- Loeb provisionally won the 2002 Monte Carlo Rally, but was later docked two minutes for an illegal tyre change and demoted to second place.
- Loeb also provisionally won the 2009 Rally Australia, but was penalised one minute to second place as his car was fitted with a non-regulation part.
