= Valerie Domleo =

English rally co-driver (1932–2020)

Valerie Domleo-Morley
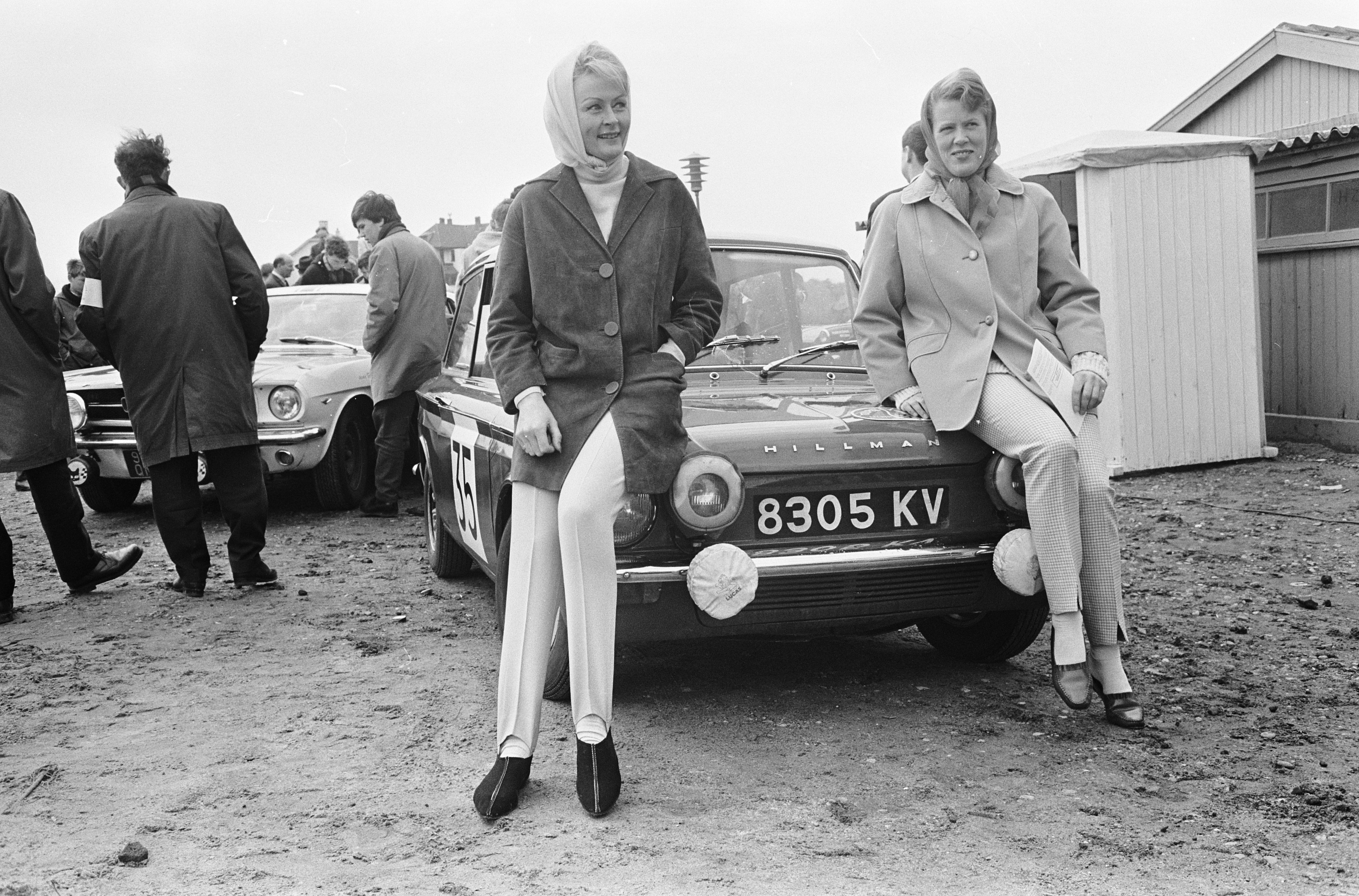
- Valerie Domleo (far right) and Rosemary Smith, Tulpenrally, 1965
- Born: Ella Valerie Joyce Domleo; 11 April 1932; Hendon, Middlesex, England
- Died: 24 December 2020 (aged 88); Stowmarket, Suffolk, England
- Occupations: Co-driver, physicist and farmer
- Spouse: Donald Morley (married 1966)
- Children: Andrew Brian Morley; Roger Mark Morley

Valerie Domleo (11 April 1932 – 24 December 2020), also known as Valerie Domleo-Morley or Valerie Morley, was an English physicist, rally co-driver and farmer.

== Formative years and family ==
Domleo was born in Hendon, Middlesex, England on 11 April 1932 to Allan Domleo, who became the mayor of Derby in Derbyshire, and Ella Muriel White. She had an older brother, Allan P. Domleo. Educated at the Ockbrook School, she subsequently earned a university degree in physics in London.

Valerie wed fellow rally driver Donald Morley at the Dale Street Methodist Church in Warwick on July 11, 1966. They had two sons, Andrew and Roger, both born in Ipswich, and were married until Donald's death in 2006.

In her later years, after retiring from rallying, Valerie and her family became farmers in Stowmarket, Suffolk County, England. She died in Stowmarket on 24 December 2020, at the age of 88.

== Scientific career ==
Sometime after her university graduation, Domleo secured employment as a physicist with Morris Motors in Coventry, West Midlands. During the early 1960s, she was employed as a physicist at a research organization in Sutton Coldfield, Birmingham. By 1965, she was working as a physicist in Leamington Spa, Warwickshire.

== Driving career ==
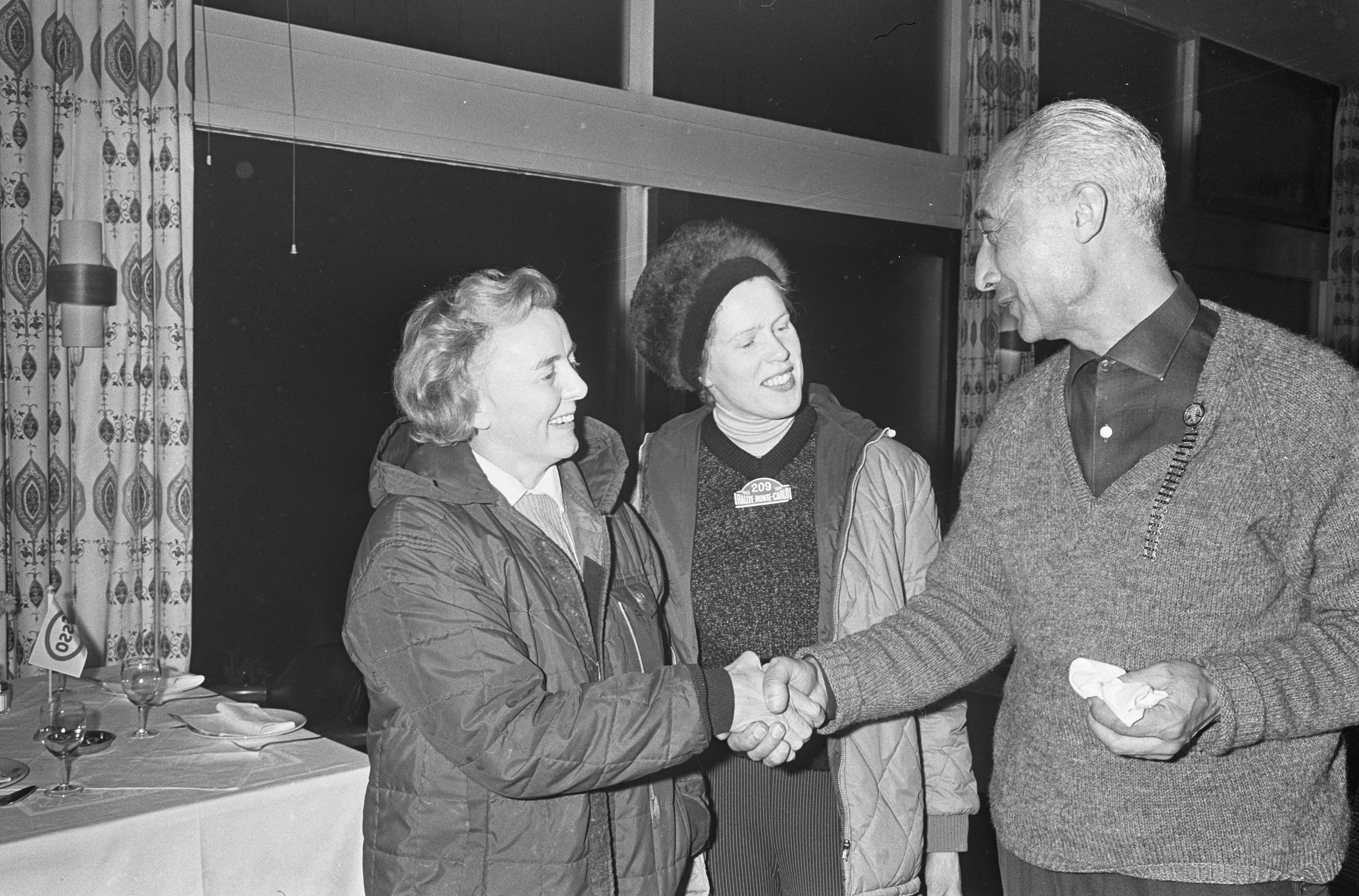
Valerie Domleo (center), Rally de Monte Carlo, January 1965

A motorcycle enthusiast in her early twenties, Domleo took up rally driving during the 1950s. Her first event was as "a navigator in a club treasure hunt." In 1958, she and Rosemary Smith, a dress designer from Dublin, won the four-day Dutch Tulip Rally. The duo drove "a factory entered Hillman Imp" as one of 159 cars participating from sixteen countries in the April 1965 rally that covered roughly 1,800 miles.

During the 1960s, she competed in European Rally Championship events, mainly as co-driver to numerous other women who drove during this same period, including Rosemary Smith, Pat Moss, Pauline Mayman and Anne Hall. Partnering with Anne Hall, she won the Ladies Award in the 1960 RAC Rally and the 1961 Monte Carlo Rally.

Domleo most often drove for the Ford, B.M.C. or Rootes teams and was a member of the Godiva Car Club during the mid-1960s.

An article in Motor Sport in July 1961 described her as "one of Britain's best navigators."

=== Injuries ===
In 1964, she sustained burns during a car fire that broke out after her team's Mini Cooper, which was being driven by Mayman, collided with a farm tractor during the Monte Carlo rally. Flown home after her initial treatment, she recuperated and returned to driving.
