= Donald Morley =

British rally driver (1930–2006)

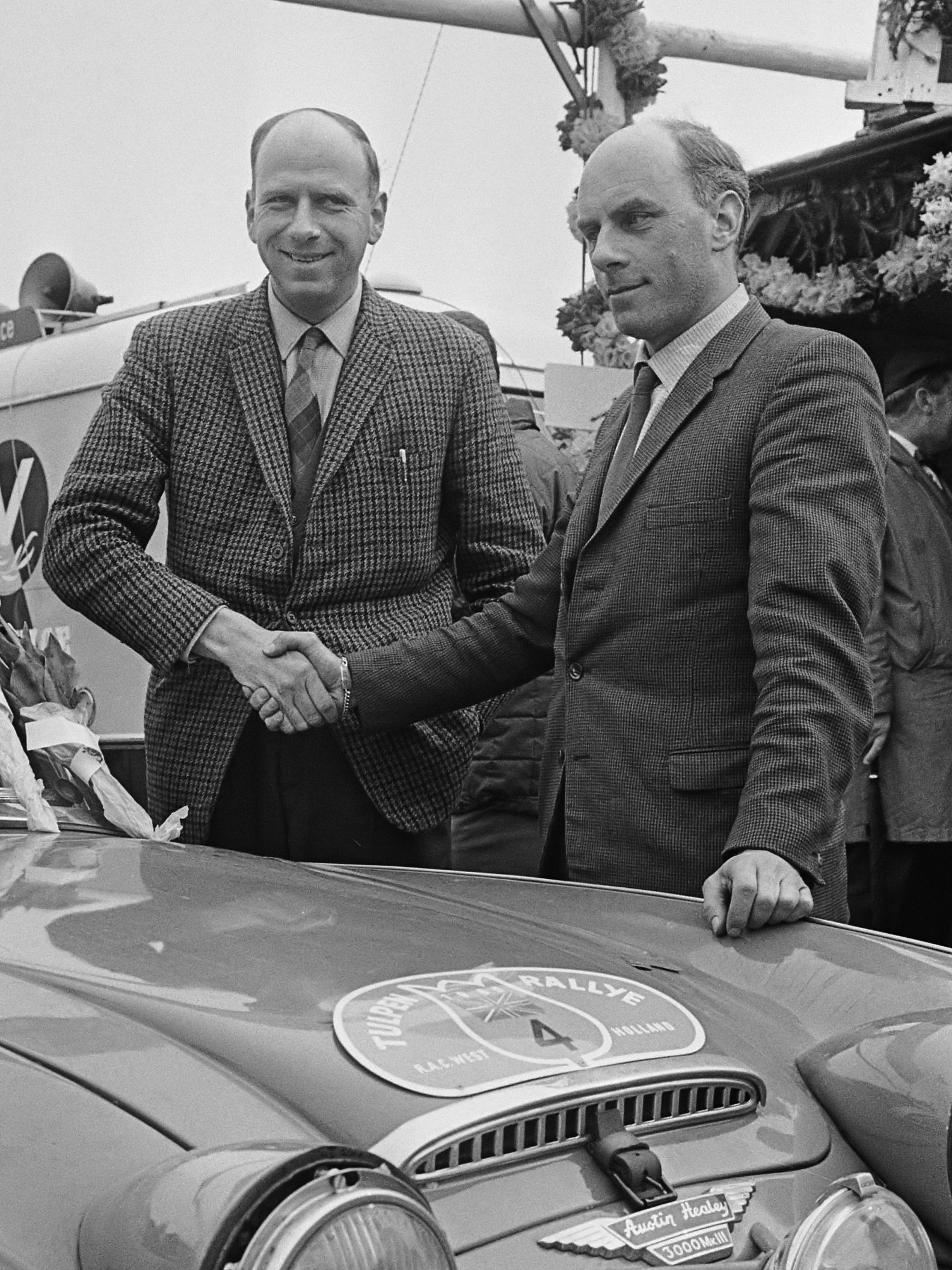
- Donald and Erle Morley (1965)
- Born: 7 October 1930; Hitcham, Suffolk
- Died: 23 June 2006 (aged 75); Gipping, Suffolk
- Occupation: Race car driver
- Spouse: Valerie Domleo (married 1966)

Donald Jude Morley (7 October 1930 – 23 June 2006) was a British racing driver from Suffolk who specialised in rally driving.

== Career ==
He won the Coupe des Alpes (Alpine Rally) in France three times, in 1961 and 1962, driving an Austin-Healey 3000, and was co-driven by Earle Morley, his identical twin brother. In doing so, he became the first British driver to win the race in more than 10 years. Donald also came onto the podium in the RAC Rally in 1960.

In 1966 he married Valerie Domleo, also a rally driver who co-drove for popular female drivers of the decade such as Pauline Mayman and Rosemary Smith.

In his later years after retiring from rallying, Donald and his family became farmers in Stowmarket.

== Rally results ==
Year	Rally	Car	Co-driver	Result
1959	Internationale Tulpenrallye	Jaguar 3.4	Erle Morley	1st
1961	Coupe des Alpes	Austin Healey 3000	Erle Morley	1st
1962	Coupe des Alpes	Austin Healey 3000	Erle Morley	1st
1964	Rallye Monte Carlo	Austin Healey 3000	Erle Morley	17th
1965	Rallye Monte Carlo	BMC Mini Cooper	Erle Morley	27th
