= 1955 Internationale Tulpenrallye =

1955 Internationale Tulpenrallye: 7. Internationale Tulpenrallye
← Previous event	Next event →
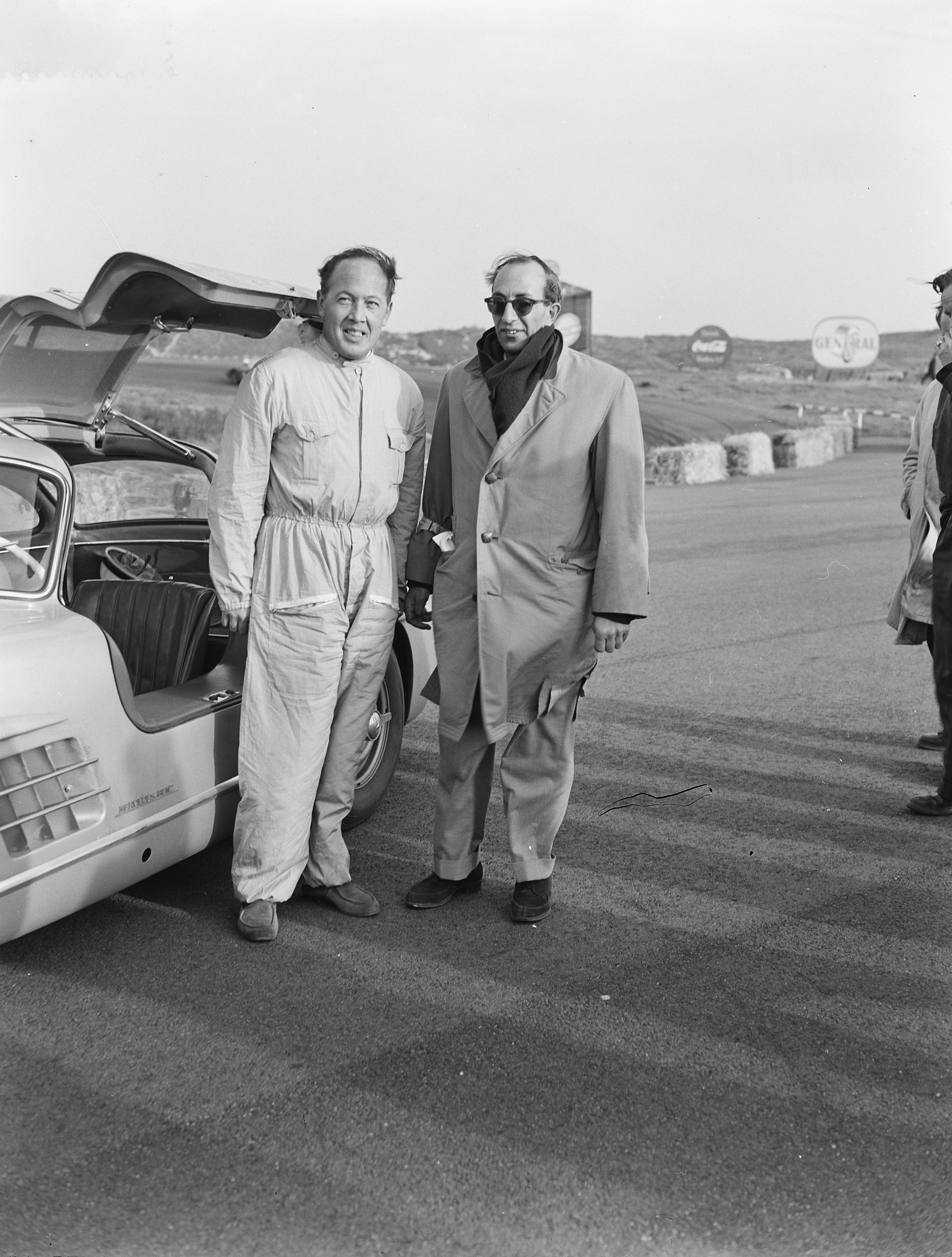
- Tak & Niemöller
- Host country: NED
- Dates run: 23 – 28 April 1955

Overall results
- Overall winner: (Netherlands) Hans Tak (Netherlands) W.C. Niemöller; Mercedes-Benz 300 SL

The 1955 Internationale Tulpenrallye was the 7th Internationale Tulpenrallye. It was won for the first time by W.J.J. "Hans" Tak, driving a Mercedes-Benz 300 SL.

== Results ==
Pos.	No.	Driver	Car	Time
1	2	(Netherlands) Hans Tak	Mercedes-Benz 300 SL	1:07:56
2	56	(United Kingdom) John Banks	Bristol 401	1:08:05
3	100	(Germany) Werner Engel	Mercedes-Benz 220A	
4	207	(Netherlands) Maurice Gatsonides	Standard Ten	
5	211	(Sweden) Rolf Mellde	SAAB 92 B	
6	131	(Germany) Walter Schlüter	DKW F91	
7	79	(United Kingdom) Peter Harper	Sunbeam-Talbot 90	
8	46	(United Kingdom) John Boardman	Jaguar Mark VII	
9	209	(Norway) Greta Molander	SAAB 92 B	
10	89	(Denmark) Harald Stenfeld-Hansen	Mercedes-Benz 220A	
11	37	(United Kingdom) John Gott	AC ACE	
12	38	(United Kingdom) Cuth Harrison	Ford Zephyr	
13	6	(United Kingdom) R.W. Faulkner	Aston Martin DB 2-4	
14	118	(Netherlands) Petrus Jetten	Vauxhall Cresta	
15	78	(United Kingdom) Sheila van Damm	Sunbeam-Talbot 90	
16	147	(Sweden) Martin Carstedt	Ford Taunus 15M	
17	30	(United Kingdom) Ken Richardson	Triumph TR 2	
18	194	(Netherlands) J. A. J. Heidendahl	Peugeot 203	
19	175	(Netherlands) H.L. Steunebrink	Fiat 1100	
20	62	(Netherlands) W. F. Coenen	Chevrolet V 8	
21	134	(Germany) Walther Scheube	Ford Taunus 15M	
22	32	(Netherlands) Rob Slotemaker	Triumph TR 2	
-	5	(Netherlands) Carel Godin de Beaufort	Porsche 1500 Super	
-	7	(United Kingdom) J. A. Walker	Jaguar XK 120	
-	14	(Netherlands) J. van der Pijl	Austin-Healey 100/4	
-	28	(United Kingdom) Jimmy Ray	Triumph TR 2	
-	39	(United Kingdom) Lord Carnegie	Ford Zephyr	
DNF	139	(United Kingdom) Pat Moss	MG Magnette	DNF (Lubrication)
