= Tulip Rally =

Dutch rally competition

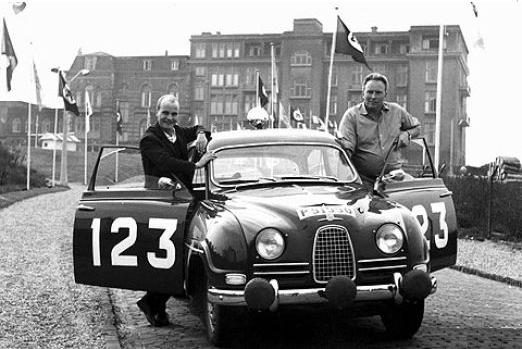
Erik Carlsson with his Saab before the 1962 event

The Tulip Rally (Dutch: Tulpenrallye) is the oldest rally competition in the Netherlands, first held in 1949. It was a round of the European Rally Championship from 1953 to 1978. In 1992 it became a classic rally, and was included in the European Historic Rally Championship.

The teams are divided into three classes: Tour, Sport and Expert. The Expert Class is for the navigators which in the past 2–6 years in the Top-20 of the Sport class have ended, or the previous years in the Top-20 of the Expert Class finished or in the Top-5 of the Sport Class. The Class Tour teams ride with little or no experience.

Participating cars must have been built before December 31, 1971. They are Class C, D, E, F or G divided depending on their age. If there are not more than three cars in one of these classes, the class is merged with the next class. In 2007 there were 43 teams in the Expert class with, 140 in the Sporting / Expert Class, 93 in the Sporting Class and 42 in the Touring Class.

According to the current event rules, it is not allowed to use a mobile phone unless you have bad luck (such as a breakdown). Modern stopwatches and watches are allowed. It is allowed to have up to 10 liters extra fuel in your trunk. Violations of the maximum speed is punished with penalty seconds.

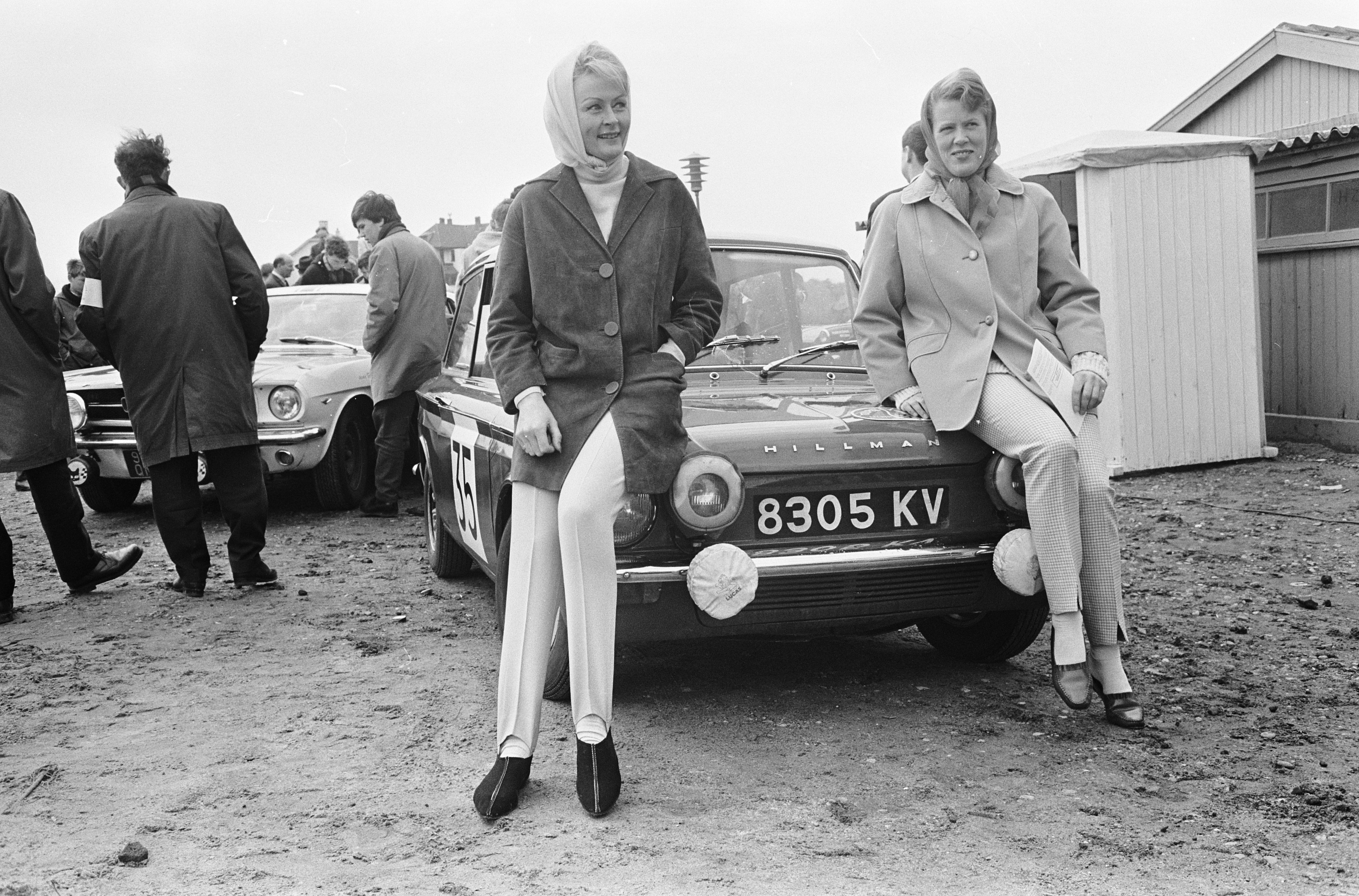
Rosemary Smith and navigator, Valerie Domleo, 1965 winners

Though organized in the Netherlands, most of the 2 500 kilometer route is run outside its organizing country, and the start itself is given from abroad. For instance, the 2019 competition starts from Andorra and most of the rallye goes through France and Belgium.

== Winners ==
=== Historic Tulip Rally ===
Edition	Year	Driver	Navigator	Car
69	2023	(Netherlands) Harm Lamberigts	(Belgium) Bart den Hartog	Ford Escort Mexico 1971
68	2022	(Netherlands) Hans van der Kooij	(Netherlands) Bas de Rijk	Alfa Romeo GT Junior
67	2021	(Netherlands) Harm Lamberigts	(Belgium) Bart den Hartog	Ford Escort Mexico 1971
	2020	2020 edition cancelled due to Covid-19 pandemic		
66	2019	(Netherlands) Harm Lamberigts	(Belgium) Bart den Hartog	Ford Escort Mexico 1971
65	2018	(Netherlands) Harm Lamberigts	(Belgium) Bart den Hartog	Ford Escort Mexico 1971
64	2017	(Netherlands) Albert Boekel	(Netherlands) Remco Luksemburg	Alfa Romeo Giulia 1966
63	2016	(Netherlands) Alexander Leurs	(Netherlands) Peter van Hoof	Opel Ascona 1.9 SR 1970
62	2015	(Netherlands) Rinus Sinke	(Belgium) Bart den Hartog	Austin Healey 1957
61	2014	(Netherlands) Alexander Leurs	(Netherlands) Peter van Hoof	Opel Ascona 1.9 SR 1970
60	2013	(Netherlands) Koen Bender	(Netherlands) Willem van Leeuwen	MG A Twincam 1959
59	2012	(Netherlands) Rinus Sinke	(Belgium) Bart den Hartog	Austin Healey 1957
58	2011	(Netherlands) Jan Ebus	(Netherlands) Jan Berkhof	Mercedes-Benz 300SL roadster 1957
57	2010	(United Kingdom) Paul Wignall	(United Kingdom) Mark Appleton	Porsche 911 1970
56	2009	(Netherlands) Rinus Sinke	(Belgium) Bart den Hartog	Austin Healey 1957
55	2008	(Netherlands) Rutger Reinders	(Netherlands) Erwin Berkhof	Porsche 911 1970
54	2007	(Netherlands) Jos Lommerse	(Netherlands) Marleen Hendrikse	Alfa Romeo Giulia 1300
53	2006	(Netherlands) Bert Dolk	(Netherlands) Erwin Berkhof	Alfa Romeo Giulietta Sprint
52	2005	(Netherlands) Bert Dolk	(Netherlands) Erwin Berkhof	Alfa Romeo Giulietta Sprint
51	2004	(Netherlands) Bert Dolk	(Netherlands) Erwin Berkhof	Alfa Romeo Giulietta Sprint
50	2003	(Netherlands) Karel Westerman	(Netherlands) Roosenboom	Porsche 356 B
49	2002	(Netherlands) Ebus	(Netherlands) Jan Berkhof	Mercedes-Benz 300 SL
48	2001	(Netherlands) Bert Dolk	(Belgium) Robert Rorife	Volvo 122 S
47	2000	(Netherlands) Adrie Brugmans	(Netherlands) Jaap Daamen	Alfa Romeo Giulia GT
46	1999	(Netherlands) Horst Deumel	(Netherlands) Potjans	BMW 2000 TI
45	1998	(Netherlands) Eddy van den Hoorn	(Netherlands) René Smeets	Volvo 122 S
44	1997	(Netherlands) Eddy van den Hoorn	(Netherlands) René Smeets	Volvo 122 S
43	1996	(Belgium) Roger Munda	(Belgium) Robert Rorife	Porsche 911
42	1995	(Netherlands) Eddy van den Hoorn	(Netherlands) René Smeets	Volvo 122 S
41	1994	(Denmark) Andersen	(Denmark) Friborg	Volvo 123 GT
40	1993	(Netherlands) Peter van Merksteijn	(Netherlands) Hans van Beek	Porsche 911
39	1992	(Netherlands) Peter van Merksteijn	(Netherlands) Hans van Beek	Porsche 911

=== Tulip Rally ===
Edition	Year	Driver	Navigator	Car
38	1991	(Netherlands) John Bosch	(United Kingdom) Kevin Gormley	BMW M3
1990 edition canceled
37	1989	(Netherlands) Erwin Doctor	(Netherlands) Theo Badenberg	Sierra RS Cosworth
36	1988	(Netherlands) John Bosch	(United Kingdom) Kevin Gormley	BMW M3
35	1987	(Netherlands) John Bosch	(United Kingdom) Guy Hodgson	Audi Quattro A2
34	1986	(Sweden) Stig Andervang	(Netherlands) Anja Lieuwma	Ford RS200
33	1985	(Netherlands) John Bosch	(Belgium) Lambert Peeters	Audi Quattro A2
32	1984	(Sweden) Stig Andervang	(Netherlands) André Schoonenwolf	Ford Escort RS1800
31	1983	(Netherlands) Renger Guliker	(Netherlands) Dickhout	Porsche 911 SC
30	1982	(Netherlands) Jan Bak	(Netherlands) André Schoonenwolf	Porsche Carrera
1981 edition canceled
29	1980	(Netherlands) Jan van der Marel	(Netherlands) Bruno van Traa	Opel Kadett GT/E
28	1979	(Sweden) Bror Danielsson	(United Kingdom) David Booth	Ford Escort RS1800
27	1978	(United Kingdom) Russell Brookes	(United Kingdom) Peter Bryant	Ford Escort RS1800
26	1977	(Belgium) Gilbert Staepelaere	(Belgium) Eric Bessem	Ford Escort RS1800
25	1976	(Sweden) Lars Carlsson	(Netherlands) Bob de Jong	Opel Kadett GT/E
1975 edition canceled
24	1974	(Germany) Walter Röhrl	(Germany) Jochen Berger	Opel Ascona
23	1973	(Netherlands) Bert Dolk	(Netherlands) Bob de Jong	Opel Ascona SR
1971/1972 edition canceled
22	1970	(Netherlands) Kees van Grieken	(Netherlands) Marcel Verbunt	BMW 2002 TI
21	1969	(Belgium) Gilbert Staepelare	(Belgium) André Aerts	Ford Escort TC
20	1968	(United Kingdom) Roger Clark	(United Kingdom) Jim Porter	Ford Escort TC
19	1967	(United Kingdom) Vic Elford	(United Kingdom) David Stone	Porsche 911 S
18	1966	(Finland) Rauno Aaltonen	(United Kingdom) Henry Liddon	BMC Mini Cooper S
17	1965	(Republic of Ireland) Rosemary Smith	(United Kingdom) Valerie Domleo	Hillman Imp
16	1964	(Finland) Timo Mäkinen	(United Kingdom) Tony Ambrose	Morris Mini Cooper S
15	1963	(France) Gréder	(France) Delalande	Ford Falcon Sprint
14	1962	(United Kingdom) Pat Moss	(United Kingdom) Ann Riley	Morris Mini Cooper
13	1961	(United Kingdom) Geoff Mabbs	(United Kingdom) Leslier Griffits	Triumph Herald Coupé
12	1960	(France) René Trautmann	(France) Verrier	Citroën ID 19
11	1959	(United Kingdom) Donald Morley	(United Kingdom) Morley (United Kingdom) Hencock	Jaguar 3.4
10	1958	(Germany) Kolwes	(Germany) Lautmann	Volvo PV 544
9	1957	(Netherlands) Hans Kreisel	(Netherlands) Ten Hope	Renault Dauphine
8	1956	(United Kingdom) Raymond Brookes	(United Kingdom) Edward Brookes	Austin A30
7	1955	(Netherlands) Hans Tak	(Netherlands) Wim C. Niemöller	Mercedes-Benz 300 SL
6	1954	(Belgium) Pierre Stasse	(Belgium) Olivier Gendebien	Alfa Romeo 1900 Ti
5	1953	(Netherlands) Hugo van Zuijlen van Nijevelt	(Netherlands) Frans Eschauzier	Jowett Javelin
4	1952	(United Kingdom) Ken Wharton	(Netherlands) Jan J. Langelaan (United Kingdom) Meisl	Ford Consul
3	1951	(United Kingdom) Ian Appleyard	(United Kingdom) Pat Appleyard (United Kingdom) Carol	Jaguar XK120
2	1950	(United Kingdom) Ken Wharton	(Netherlands) Jan J. Langelaan (United Kingdom) John-Hamilton Dorsett	Ford Pilot
1	1949	(United Kingdom) Ken Wharton	(United Kingdom) Joy Cooke	Ford Anglia
