= Rosemary Smith =

Irish motor racing driver (1937–2023)

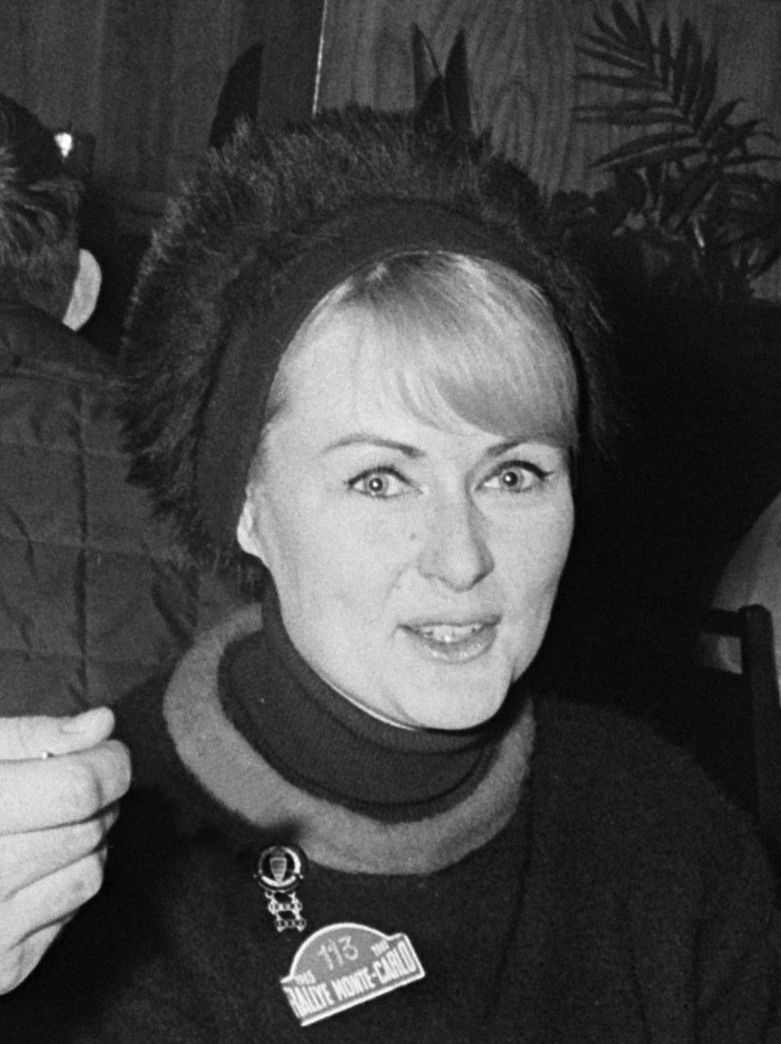
- Smith at the Rally de Monte Carlo, 1965
- Born: 7 August 1937; Dublin, Ireland
- Died: 5 December 2023 (aged 86); Dublin, Ireland

Championship titles
- Winner 1965 Tulip Rally

Signature
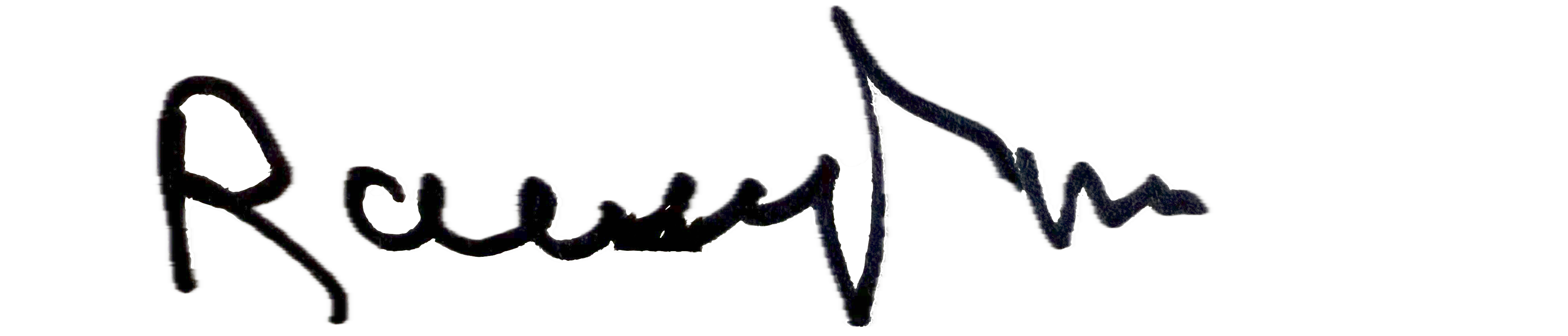

Rosemary Smith (7 August 1937 – 5 December 2023) was an Irish rally driver and driving instructor from Dublin, Ireland. She competed for the Rootes and Ford factory rally teams. As a factory team driver for the Rootes Group throughout the 1960s, she won several trophies in championship rally events around Europe. She competed in several endurance rally events around the world.

== Early life ==
Rosemary Smith was born on 7 August 1937 in Dublin, Ireland. She was the youngest of three children to a Protestant father and a Catholic mother. Her father owned a garage and was an amateur motor racer. She learned to handle a car, her family's Vauxhall estate, by age 11 while on summer holidays, long before she could legally drive. Smith attended the Loreto High School Beaufort in Rathfarnham, Dublin, but had little enthusiasm for the school on account of mistreatment from the members of the convent. Smith found interests outside of school, including horseback riding, golf, field hockey, tennis, and driving. She initially pursued a career in fashion, enrolling at the Grafton Academy of Fashion Design and later working as a dress designer and model at a local fashion boutique.

== Career ==
=== Early career ===
Smith's unconventional entry into rally driving happened in the late 1950s, seemingly by chance. She had been running a dress shop and boutique in the outskirts of Dublin when her friend and amateur rally driver, Delphine Bigger, invited her to serve as a navigator in an upcoming rally in Kilkenny. During that event, maps and navigating didn't suit Smith and driving didn't suit Bigger, so the two swapped seats, with Smith taking the wheel. The pair ended up achieving a win in the ladies’ class and beating most of the men. The two entered several more rallies together, including the Circuit of Ireland Rally in 1959.

By 1960, Smith, with Bigger co-driving, had begun participating in major rallies, including the RAC Rally of Great Britain, a 2,400-mile event. In Smith's words, the two were "totally unprepared and inexperienced", but nevertheless enthusiastic. In 1962, she entered the Monte Carlo Rally with Sally Anne Cooper, an English heiress, and Cooper's friend, Pat Wright, in an ex-works Sunbeam Rapier. Her strong performance caught the attention of the Rootes Group's competition department and its team boss, Norman Garrad, who had been trailing Smith for part of the 1962 Monte Carlo Rally. The Rootes team, who ran Hillman and Sunbeam cars, offered Smith a factory team position, turning her into a professional rally driver.

=== Works rally team career ===
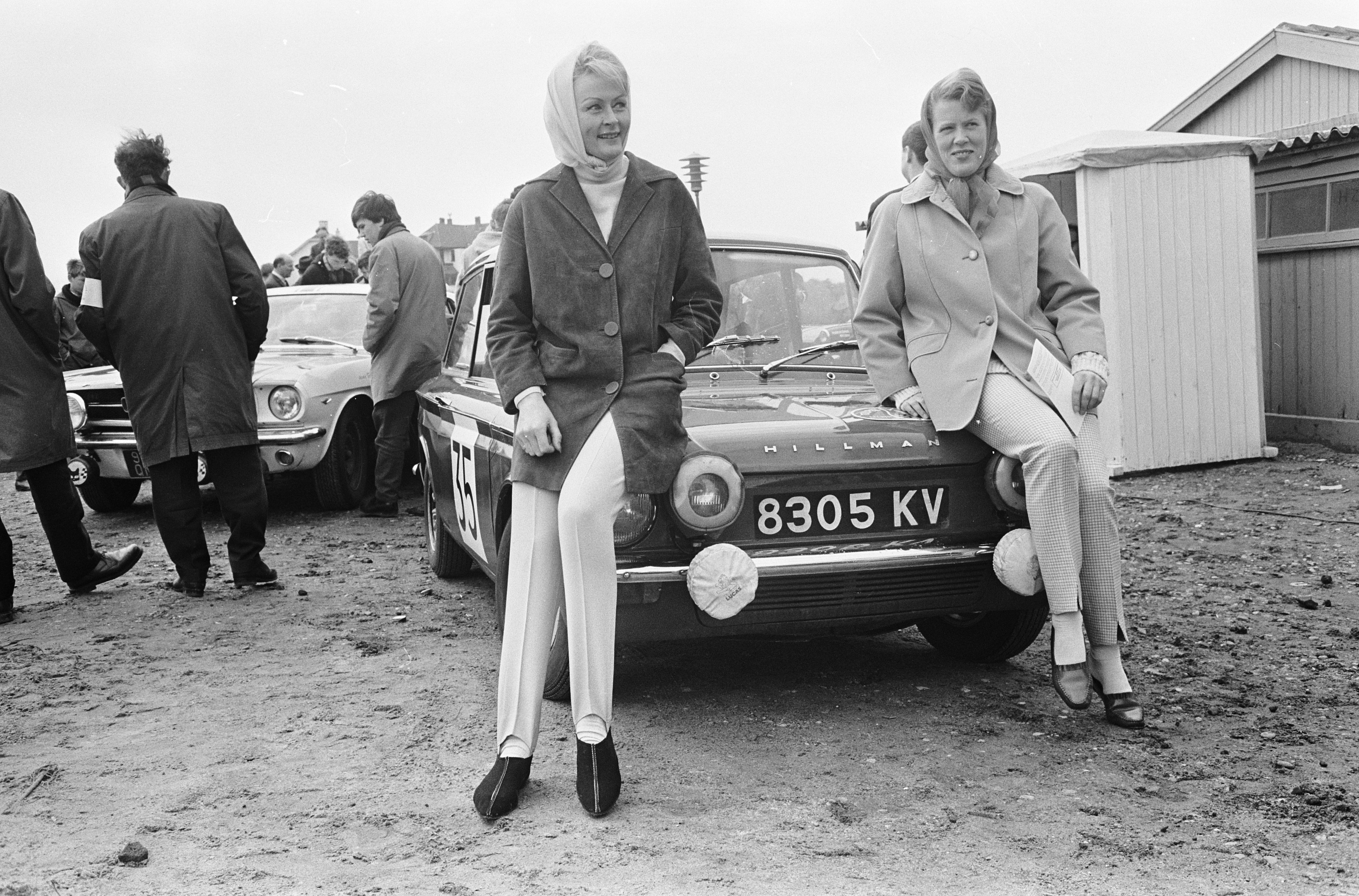
Smith and navigator, Valerie Domleo, winners of the Tulip Rally, 1965

In 1964, Smith took her first major rally accolade by winning the ladies’ division or Coupe des dames in the Circuit of Ireland Rally with her co-driver, Valerie Domleo, a British physicist. The following year, 1965, marked a breakthrough in her career: alongside navigator Valerie Domleo, Smith won the Dutch Tulip Rally outright in the four-day, 1,800-mile event driving her Hillman Imp through snow and ice. Smith's victory made headlines and earned her congratulations from celebrities like Richard Burton and Elizabeth Taylor. It also led to Smith's being named Texaco Sportstar of the Year in 1965 for her achievement.

Smith's success continued through the mid-1960s. She became known for securing numerous class wins and ladies’ trophies in the top European rallies. In 1966, she appeared to have won the Coupe des Dames in the Monte Carlo Rally, but was disqualified in a controversial decision over non-standard headlamps. Smith was outraged by the disqualification, calling it a “disgrace” by the organizers. She amassed 12 international rally class victories over her career, including wins in women's categories on events like the Scottish Rally, Alpine Rally, Acropolis Rally, and the trans-Canada Shell 4000 Rally. Notably, in the 1966 and 1967 Shell 4000 rallies, which were 4,100-mile treks across Canada, Smith won the small-engine categories, the women's categories and finished 8th and 13th overall respectively.

In 1968, Smith took part in the London–Sydney Marathon, an over-10,000-mile endurance rally from the UK to Australia. During that event, Smith demonstrated resourcefulness when her Lotus Cortina began running on three cylinders, thus losing engine power, while ascending the Khyber Pass, which runs from Afghanistan to Pakistan. Unwilling to give up, she turned the car around and drove in reverse gear up the pass to coax it over the mountain, allowing her to continue when forward gears failed. She was able to record a 48th-place finish despite the mechanical issues plaguing her car. Two years later, Smith entered another endurance rally, the 1970 London to Mexico World Cup Rally, which spanned 16,000 miles across Europe and South America. Despite an encounter with bandits in the Andes (who, upon realizing Smith and her co-driver were women, let them pass unharmed and took money from the rest of the competitors), she pressed on to finish 10th overall.

In 1969 she achieved an outright win in the Cork 20 Rally in Ireland. She also remained a competitor in other international events. Teaming up with British co-driver Pauline Gullick, the pair tackled the notoriously challenging East African Safari Rally in 1974. The pair survived the Safari's torturous conditions, winning the ladies’ division and finishing 16th overall. Over her rally career she drove a variety of makes: Rootes cars (Hillman Imps, Sunbeam Tigers/Rapiers) initially, and later Ford Escorts while driving for the Ford works rally team, British Motor Corporation Minis, Opel Kadetts, Porsche 911s, Lancia Fulvias, and various Nissan/Datsun rally cars in various events.

=== Later career ===
Smith gradually stepped back from regular competition in the mid-1970s. She established an Irish land speed record of 156.101 mph on the Carrigrohane Straight in Cork in June 1978, driving a seven-litre Jaguar XJ6. By the 1980s, Smith had largely retired from professional rallying. In the 1990s, she turned her attention to driving education by founding the Rosemary Smith Driving School, established in 1998. Through this school and related safety campaigns, she taught fundamentals of good, safe driving for Irish youth.

In May 2017, at the age of 79, Smith became the oldest person ever to drive a Formula One car, taking the wheel of a 800-horsepower Renault F1 car around the Circuit Paul Ricard in France. The event was arranged as part of Renault's 40th anniversary in F1, recognizing Smith's status as a motorsport icon. In 2018, she recounted her life and career in a memoir titled Driven, which she co-wrote with Ann Ingle. Rosemary Smith remained active for interviews, classic car events, and speaking engagements well into her 80s.

== Personal life and legacy ==
Smith battled cancer in her final years, and on 5 December 2023, she died in Dublin at the age of 86. Her death prompted tributes from across the racing community and throughout Ireland, including from Ireland's President and Taoiseach.

Smith's impact on motorsport has been profound. Along with contemporaries like Pat Moss, Smith was a trailblazer for female drivers, and one of the most accomplished women in world rallying history. "Rosemary was a trailblazer who inspired many with her remarkable career," said Rosemary Walsh of Motorsport Ireland, noting that Smith “had the passion and the talent to succeed at the highest level, and her legacy continues to inspire drivers today." In late 2023, Motorsport Ireland inaugurated the Rosemary Smith Award to honor a current female motorsport competitor who embodies Smith's passion and spirit.

Smith became a celebrity and role model through her rallying career. In 1966, she appeared as a guest on an episode of What's My Line. Arlene Francis, Mark Goodson, Ginger Rogers, and Bennett Cerf were on the panel and successfully guessed her "line" as a rally driver. In 2001, An Post, the Irish national provider of postal services, featured her image on a postage stamp celebrating Irish motorsport heroes. In 2018, she was inducted into the Irish Motorsport Hall of Fame and received a Lifetime Achievement honor at the Irish Motorsport Awards. In 2022 she was admitted into the FIVA Heritage Hall of Fame, recognizing her distinguished career in motoring and lifelong contributions to automotive heritage. Her death in 2023 was met with widespread tributes. Irish President Michael D. Higgins praised her as a motorsport pioneer, and Taoiseach Leo Varadkar noted how she "drove straight through the gender barrier" in racing.
