= Róisín Ingle =

Irish journalist, columnist, editor and podcaster

- Born: 7 October 1971 (age 55); Sandymount, Dublin
- Citizenship: Irish
- Occupations: Journalist, editor, columnist, podcaster
- Children: 2
- Writing career
- Notable awards: Young Journalist of the Year (Ireland), 1996

Róisín Ingle (born 7 October 1971) is an Irish writer – a journalist, columnist and editor – as well as a podcast presenter and producer. She grew up in Sandymount, Dublin and, except for a brief stint in the UK, has lived and worked in Ireland for most of her life. She started working at the Sunday Tribune and then moved to the Irish Times in the late 1990s, where she has worked since, notably producing a widely read lifestyle column, working as a features editor and producing multiple series of podcasts. Selections of her columns, which number more than 4,000, have been collected in two books. Ingle has also co-produced and contributed to another publication, and edited others, notably a collection of work by Maeve Binchy.

== Biography ==
=== Early life ===
Ingle was born in Sandymount, Dublin in 1971. Her mother, Ann, was born in England, while her father, Peter, was from Dublin; they met in Newquay in Cornwall. They brought up their family in Sandymount. Following five years living with schizophrenia, Peter Ingle died by suicide in 1980, when Róisín was eight, leaving his wife of 19 years, then 41 years old, with 8 children ranging from 2 to 17 years old.

Ingle went to primary school at Scoil Mhuire, Lakelands, Sandymount, and secondary school at Dominican College Sion Hill, a convent school in Blackrock.

=== Maynooth and the Sunday Tribune ===
For a year Ingle attended Maynooth College, having not secured points for another course selection at Trinity College Dublin. She went to the UK to seek work, living in a squat in Birmingham, and later securing a job as a waitress in Golders Green, London at 22. She met a Bosnian refugee, Mladen, there, and they married and settled in Ireland.

Ingle entered journalism at the Sunday Tribune in 1995. She won the Young Journalist of the Year Award at the National Media Awards presented by President Mary Robinson in October 1996.

=== The Irish Times ===
In the late 1990s Ingle moved to the Irish Times, first as a journalist, with her first archived article covering a new unit at Wheatfield Prison, then also as a columnist, and later also as deputy, and then daily, Features Editor. Mostly working from the main Irish Times office in Dublin, she was based for a period at the newspaper's Belfast office.

Ingle's columns, often sharing highly personal observations, are published weekly at the front of the Irish Times's weekend supplement. They began in 2002, when she took over a column entitled Regarding Ireland, initially for three weeks, and then continued, with occasional breaks, such as beginning in 2015. The Phoenix Magazine has commented that - on occasion - Ingle's writing in her column appears to be "...in part through the lens of a teenage girl with an axe to grind." Ingle is an self-professed fan of senior Irish Times columnist Fintan O'Toole.

==== Books ====
A first collection of Ingle's columns was published in 2005, after they had run for about three years. Launched at an event hosted by close friend Paul Howard, inventor of Ross O'Carroll-Kelly, and attended by her partner, mother, and at least five of her siblings, it included an autobiographical essay of around 50 pages, covering her early life and career development, including several traumatic events.

Ingle was approached by communications professional Natasha Fennell, who was considering a book concept "Ten Things To Do With Your Mother Before She Dies" and Ingle invited interested women to attend a regular gathering to explore the theme. Called The Daughterhood, this group had up to 9 members, and led to material for a book, which Ingle and Fennell co-released in 2015. The book, also called The Daughterhood, comprises a series of personal articles on mother and daughter relationships, and includes a personal essay by each co-producer, and was launched at a media event at Dublin's Rotunda Hospital, by Miriam O'Callaghan. The book, which has been translated into multiple languages, was nominated for the Irish Book Awards.

Later in 2015, Ingle released a second collection of her columns, Public Displays of Emotion, drawing on more than 4,000 Irish Times columns.

==== The abortion referendum debate ====
In the second collection, and in a column extracted from it, Ingle revealed, in solidarity with the "more than 150,000 women [who] have left Ireland, mostly for England, to get abortions" since 1980, that she had had an abortion about 15 years before, in the UK, when it was still illegal in Ireland. She explained the background and how she arranged it with the support of the man involved, and family and friends. Reactions were mostly positive, though some negative, and even some abusive, correspondence was received, and her revelation, and that of a high-profile Irish comedian, Tara Flynn, were judged by commentators to have added a personal dimension to the campaign to delete the clause of the Irish constitution forbidding abortion.

==== Podcasts ====
Ingle has also produced and presented podcasts for the Irish Times, over years, including the Listen Up series, the Róisín meets... series, which had reached 244 episodes by 2018, and the Back to Yours series, where she visited prominent people at home, to discuss those homes. As of 2021, she co-hosts the Irish Times Women's Podcast with Kathy Sheridan.

=== Radio ===
Ingle hosted a show on Denis O'Brien's Newstalk, Weekend Blend, for a period in the mid-2000s, with Orla Barry succeeding her in 2008.

== Publications ==
Ingle has published two volumes based on collections of her Irish Times columns:

- Pieces of Me (A Life-in-Progress), a long autobiographical essay followed by a selection from her first three years of personal columns. (Dublin, Ireland, 1 September 2005: Hodder Headline Ireland, ISBN 9780340839188) (Note: Held in multiple Irish public libraries and about a dozen copyright and international libraries, per cited Worldcat Authority Control.)
- Public Displays of Emotion, a collection of Irish Times columns. (Dublin, Ireland, 2015: Irish Times Books, ISBN 9780907011477) (Note: Held in multiple Irish public libraries and three copyright libraries, per cited Worldcat Authority Control.)

She co-produced a book on mother-daughter relationships, which included an article on herself and her mother:

- The Daughterhood, a collection of articles about mother-daughter relationships by various authors. (Dublin, Ireland, February 2015, Natasha Fennell and Róisín Ingle) (Note: Held in multiple Irish public libraries and over 170 copyright and international libraries, per cited Worldcat Authority Control.)

She has edited:

- The Thank You Book, a fund-raising initiative for the Irish Hospice Foundation, designed by Steve Averill and with an introduction by Dr Marie Murray, and contributions gathered from Seamus Heaney, Maeve Binchy, Brendan Gleeson, Edna O'Brien, Martin Sheen, Gabriel Byrne and others, and which raised around 3 million euro for the charity. (Dublin, Ireland, October 2010: Irish Hospice Foundation) (Note: Held in a few Irish public libraries and about five copyright and international libraries, per cited Worldcat Authority Control.)
- Maeve's Times - selected Irish Times writings, a compilation of pieces by popular author Maeve Binchy, who was also an Irish Times journalist, with an introduction by her husband, Gordon Snell. Edited by Ingle after she had edited a memorial Irish Times supplement on Binchy a year after Binchy's death, this is the Ingle book most widely held in libraries, over 2,000 worldwide. (London, 2013: Orion, ISBN 9781409149897) (Note: Held in many Irish public libraries and the copyright libraries and over 2,000 libraries outside Ireland, per cited Worldcat Authority Control.)

== Appearances ==
Ingle appeared on Miriam O'Callaghan's radio programme "Miriam meets..." for two joint interviews: in 2009, in the second episode of the whole series, with her mother, and in 2012 with her friend, Paul Howard. She has also appeared on television, for example on Ray D'Arcy's programme on RTÉ.

== Personal life ==
Some time after her father's death, Ingle witnessed the accidental drowning of a family friend who had become a replacement father figure to her family. Her marriage broke down in the late 1990s, and she divorced after about five years of marriage. These and other life stories were discussed in the essay element of her 2005 book, Pieces of Me.

Ingle met her long-term life partner while accompanying a senior reporter, Patsy McGarry, who was covering Unionist protests at Drumcree in Portadown, in 2000. Ingle was there to write feature pieces, and having met an Orange Order bandsman, Jonny Hobson, at a riot, planned an article on a day in his life. They became a couple some time later. She recalled these events later in a piece entitled "It was love at first riot. Twenty years later the fire still burns". Her columns have sometimes discussed the complications from their mixed Irish Catholic and Northern Irish Protestant backgrounds. They have twin daughters and live in North Strand, Dublin.

In late 2024, Ingle wrote in the Irish Times of her experience with cancer.
