= Ann Ingle =

British-Irish writer

Ann Ingle (born 1939, Hackney, London) is a British-Irish writer. Originally from London, she has lived in Dublin since the 1960s. She founded the Dublin 4 community newspaper News Four in the 1980's. She co-wrote the memoir of Irish rally driver Rosemary Smith, Driven (2018), before publishing her own memoir, Openhearted, in 2021. She is the mother of journalist Róisín Ingle.

== Early life and career ==
Originally from London, Ingle moved to Ireland in the 1960s after meeting her future husband, Peter Ingle, while on holiday in Cornwall. The couple had eight children. She worked as a typist, preparing manuscripts for writers, and later edited News Four, a community newspaper serving the Sandymount area of Dublin. She returned to education as a mature student, graduating from Trinity College Dublin with a degree in English and history.

In 2018, Ingle co-wrote Driven, the memoir of rally driver Rosemary Smith. The book was shortlisted for an Irish Book Award. She has collaborated with daughter Róisín, a journalist and columnist for The Irish Times, through interviews, and mentions in newspaper columns.

== Books ==
Ingle's memoir Openhearted: Eighty Years of Love, Loss, Laughter and Letting Go was shortlisted for the Irish Book Awards' Biography of the Year award. Still Here: Everything I Know About Being Older was published by The O'Brien Press in 2026.

== Selected works ==
- Smith, Rosemary; Ingle, Ann (2018). Driven (Ebook ed.). London: HarperCollins. ISBN 9780008301873.
- Openhearted: Eighty Years of Love, Loss, Laughter and Letting Go (2021)
- Still Here: Everything I Know About Being Older (2026)
