= Pauline Mayman =

- Born: Eve Pauline Vaughton; 26 May 1928; Bucklow, Cheshire
- Died: 1989 (aged 60–61); Gloucester, Gloucestershire
- Occupation: Rally driver
- Spouse: Lionel Mayman (married 1948)
- Children: Christopher Mayman (born 1949); Nicholas Mayman (born 1951)
- Parent(s): Wallace Johnson Vaughton; Eva Groom

Eve Pauline Mayman (née Vaughton; 1928–1989) was a British rally car driver who drove professionally in the male-dominated world of rallying. Mayman was a navigator with Pat Moss during the 1962 season, along with being her own driver. Notably winning the Baden-Baden rally with Moss, in a Mini; the two also came in third in the Geneva Rally. In Moss's signature car, the Austin-Healey 3000, they were second in the Polish Rally and third in the Alpine and RAC Rallies.

Mayman, in 1964, was part of a serious accident in Rally Monte Carlo. Her car was hit by a farmer’s truck, and she suffered a broken leg. The Alpine Rally was her first race after the accident where she placed thirteenth, sixth in the Touring class, and first lady, driving a Mini with Valerie Domleo. She also drove in the Spa-Sofia-Liège marathon rally and RAC Rally, in an MGB.

After retiring, Pauline helped run the family autoparts business. She was also involved with the breeding and rescuing of Irish Wolfhounds.

== Personal life ==
She married gentleman racer Lionel Mayman in 1948 and was the aunt of late historic racing driver Anthony Mayman. Her sons are called Christopher (born 1949, Smethwick) and Nicholas (born 1951, Birmingham).

Her parents were Wallace Johnson Vaughton and Eva Groom.

== Rally results ==
Year	Rally	Car	Co-driver	Result
1963	Coupe des Alpes	Morris Cooper S	Valerie Domleo	6th
1964	Rallye Monte Carlo	Austin Mini Cooper	Valerie Domleo	DNF
1965	Coupe des Alpes	BMC Mini Cooper	Valerie Domleo	13th
