= Denzel (automobile) =

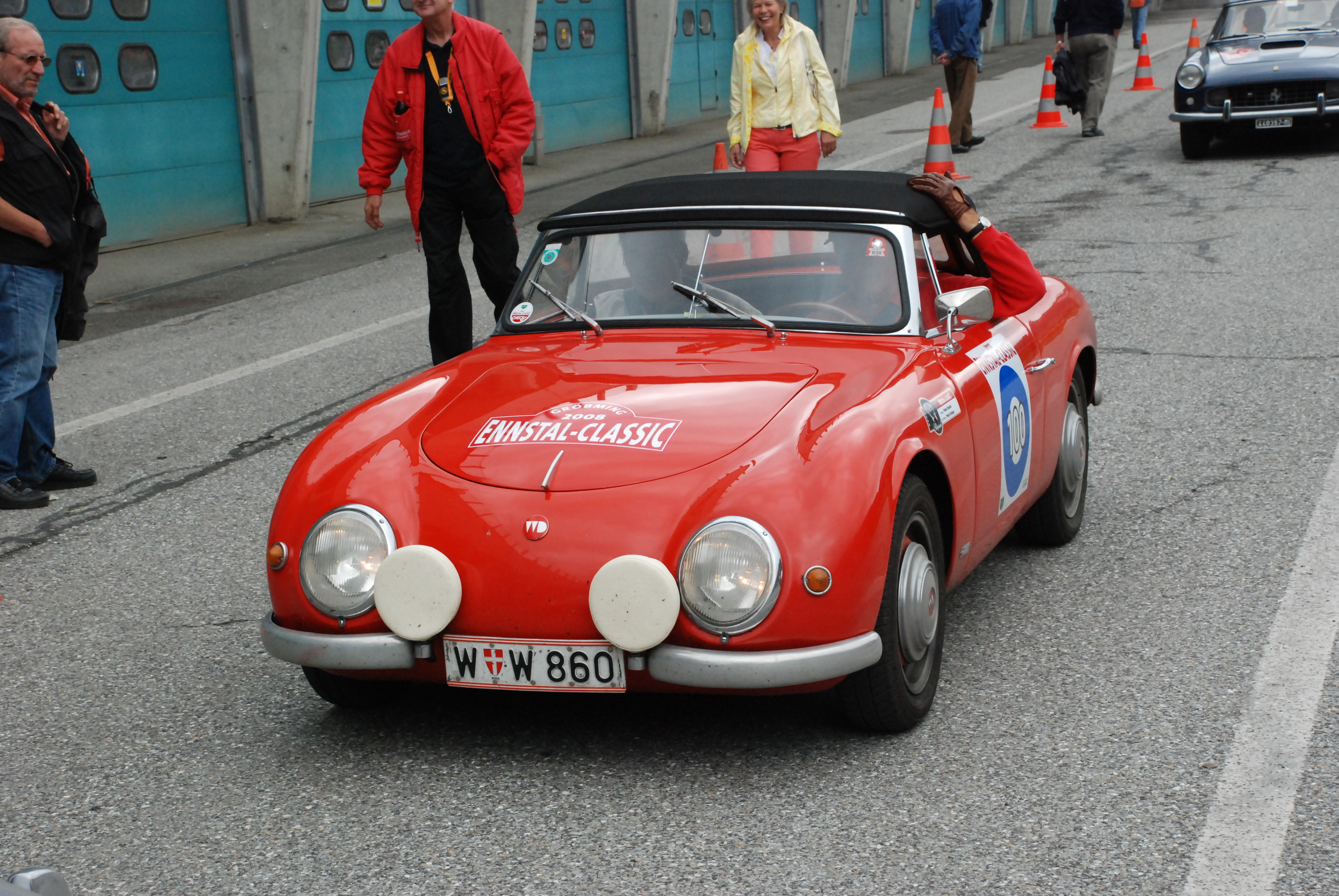
A Denzel 1300S at the Ennstal-Classic in 2008.

The Denzel automobile was an early competitor to Porsche in Vienna, Austria beginning in 1948.

Wolfgang Denzel was born in Graz, Austria in 1908. He raced motorcycles and cars both before and after World War Two. In 1948, with his friend Hubert Stroinigg, he built his first car, which was based on a chassis and air-cooled engine from a Volkswagen Kubelwagen. The lightweight body was built from resin and textile fibres. The car, at that time referred to as "the Volkswagen WD Equipment" finished first in the 1100cc class in the 1949 Austrian Alpine rally.

Five further cars followed, before production of the Series III version began in 1952. By this time, the chassis was made by the Denzel company.

Throughout the 1950s, the cars achieved limited race success on the track, with future Formula 1 stars Dan Gurney and Richie Ginther among the drivers in 1957. However, Denzel had achieved worldwide publicity with his win of the 1954 Alpine Rally. In the following year, writing in Autosport magazine, the British racing driver and journalist John Bolster praised the car, noting that "The cornering power was simply phenomenal".

Denzel only manufactured open roadsters, similar in style to the first post-war Porsche prototype. Like the Porsche marque launched in the ashes of World War II, Denzel developed its own enhanced VW drivetrain components, and on occasion even used Porsche engines in some of its later models. Earliest models used handcrafted steel bodies but switched to aluminum bodies in the mid-1950s.

Production of Denzel cars ended in 1960. Wolfgang Denzel had become the official Austrian importer for BMW in 1952, and in the late 1950s was the chief designer for the BMW 700.

It is not known for certain how many cars were built, with estimates varying from as many as 350 to as few as 65. As of 2019, it was thought that around 35 Denzel cars survive, one of which was sold at auction in 2019 for €314,375.
