= Timo Mäkinen =

Finnish rally driver (1938–2017)

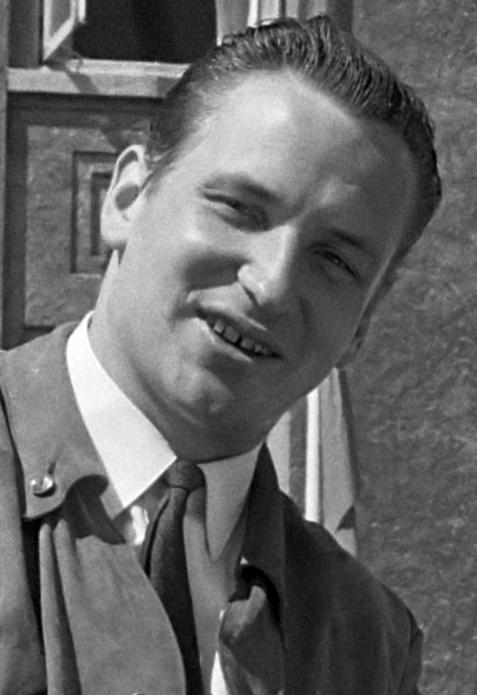
- Timo Mäkinen (1966)

Personal information
- Nationality: (Finland) Finnish
- Full name: Timo Antero Mäkinen
- Born: 18 March 1938; Helsinki, Finland
- Died: 4 May 2017 (aged 79); Helsinki, Finland

World Rally Championship record
- Years active: 1973–1981, 1994
- Co-driver: (United Kingdom) Henry Liddon (United Kingdom) John Davenport (France) Jean Todt (Finland) Atso Aho (Finland) Erkki Salonen (United Kingdom) Martin Holmes (United Kingdom) Paul Easter
- Teams: Ford, Toyota, Peugeot
- Rallies: 39
- Championships: 0
- Rally wins: 4
- Podiums: 7
- Stage wins: 73
- Total points: 7
- First rally: 1973 Monte Carlo Rally
- First win: 1973 1000 Lakes Rally
- Last win: 1975 RAC Rally
- Last rally: 1994 Monte Carlo Rally

Timo Antero Mäkinen (18 March 1938 – 4 May 2017) was a Finnish race car driver and one of the original "Flying Finns" of motor rallying. He is best remembered for his hat-trick of wins in the RAC Rally and the 1000 Lakes Rally.

== Career ==
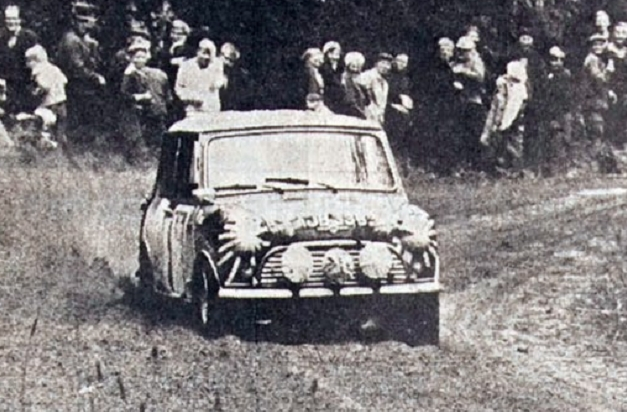
Mäkinen at the 1965 1000 Lakes

Mäkinen was born in Helsinki. His start in international rallying came in the 1959 1000 Lakes Rally (now Rally Finland), in a Triumph TR3. He later drove works Austin-Healeys and Minis. In the big Healey, he finished fifth in the RAC Rally in 1963. Mäkinen drove Minis during most of 1964 but came second in the RAC Rally in a Healey, at the end of that year. He returned to the Mini Cooper S in 1965, winning the Monte Carlo Rally and the 1000 Lakes, and capturing a Coupe des Alpes at the Alpine Rally. He came second in the 1965 RAC Rally, again in a Healey.

In 1967, Mäkinen drove his Mini at a high speed through the famous Ouninpohja stage of the 1000 Lakes with the car's bonnet open. Leather straps holding the bonnet were not thoroughly tightened, and they opened after a few rough bounces. He tried to put his head out of the side window but his helmet was too big and he could only stick his head halfway out. So he had to skid the car sideways continuously to see the road ahead. Even so, Mäkinen was third fastest on that special stage and he also won the rally overall, for the third year in a row.

In 1975, Mäkinen won the RAC for the third time in a row, at the wheel of a Ford Escort RS1800, preceded only by Erik Carlsson (Saab 96) in that feat. Mäkinen won the Finnish Rally Championship three times, the ice track championship six times and the saloon car race championship three times.

In 1969, Mäkinen competed in the very first Round Britain Powerboat Race, which he won. In 1994, Mäkinen made a brief return as Mini celebrated the 30th anniversary of their 1964 Monte Carlo win by Paddy Hopkirk, who also participated in the event. Mäkinen retired on the second stage with a fuel system problem. In 2010, he was among the first four inductees into the Rally Hall of Fame, along with Carlsson, Hopkirk and Rauno Aaltonen.

Mäkinen also traveled to Australia to race Mini Coopers in the Bathurst 500 road race. He finished sixth outright and third in class in 1965 co-driving with Northern Irish rally driver Paddy Hopkirk while finishing seventh outright and third in class in 1967 with Australian driver John French.

== Death ==
Timo Makinen died on May 4, 2017, of natural causes in Helsinki, Finland.

== Career results ==
=== Complete IMC results ===
Year	Entrant	Car	1	2	3	4	5	6	7	8	9
1970	Ford Motor Company Ltd	Ford Escort Twin Cam	MON; 7	SWE; Ret	ITA	KEN	AUT	GRE	GBR; Ret		
1971	Ford Motor Company Ltd	Ford Escort RS 1600 MKI	MON	SWE; Ret	ITA						GBR; 5
1971	Ford Motor Company Ltd	Ford Escort Twin Cam				KEN; 20	MAR	AUT	GRE	FRA	
1972	Ford Motor Company Ltd	Ford Escort RS 1600 MKI	MON; 31	SWE	KEN; 8	MAR	GRE	AUT	ITA	USA	GBR; Ret

=== Complete WRC results ===
Year	Entrant	Car	1	2	3	4	5	6	7	8	9	10	11	12	13	WDC	Points
1973	Ford Motor Company Ltd	Ford Escort RS1600	MON; 11	SWE	POR	KEN; Ret				FIN; 1	AUT	ITA	USA	GBR; 1	FRA	N/A	N/A
1973	Automobiles Peugeot	Peugeot 504					MOR; Ret	GRE	POL							N/A	N/A
1974	Automobiles Peugeot	Peugeot 504	POR	KEN; Ret												N/A	N/A
1974	Ford Motor Company Ltd	Ford Escort RS1600			FIN; 2	ITA	CAN	USA	GBR; 1	FRA						N/A	N/A
1975	Automobiles Peugeot	Peugeot 504	MON	SWE	KEN; Ret	GRE	MOR; 4	POR								N/A	N/A
1975	Ford Motor Company Ltd	Ford Escort RS1800							FIN; 3	ITA; Ret	FRA	GBR; 1				N/A	N/A
1976	Ford Motor Company Ltd	Ford Escort RS1800	MON; Ret	SWE	POR			MOR; Ret	FIN; 4	ITA		GBR; Ret				N/A	N/A
1976	Automobiles Peugeot	Peugeot 504 V6 Coupé				KEN; Ret	GRE									N/A	N/A
1976	Automobiles Peugeot	Peugeot 104 ZS									FRA; Ret					N/A	N/A
1977	Fiat S.p.A.	Fiat 131 Abarth	MON	SWE; Ret	POR				FIN; Ret	CAN; Ret	ITA		GBR; 11			NC	0
1977	Automobiles Peugeot	Peugeot 504 V6 Coupé				KEN; Ret	NZL	GRE								NC	0
1977	Automobiles Peugeot	Peugeot 104 ZS										FRA; Ret				NC	0
1978	Automobiles Peugeot	Peugeot 504 V6 Coupé	MON	SWE	KEN; Ret						CIV; 2	FRA	GBR			NC	0
1978	Automobiles Peugeot	Peugeot 104 ZS				POR; 7	GRE	FIN	CAN	ITA						NC	0
1979	Marshalls	Peugeot 504 V6 Coupé	MON	SWE	POR	KEN; Ret	GRE	NZL						CIV; Ret		NC	0
1979	Toyota Team Europe	Toyota Celica 2000 GT							FIN; Ret	CAN	ITA	FRA	GBR			NC	0
1980	BMW France	BMW 320i	MON; 14	SWE	POR	KEN										35th	7
1980	Automobiles Peugeot	Peugeot 504 V6 Coupé					GRE; 10	ARG; Ret						CIV; Ret		35th	7
1980	Timo Mäkinen Racing	Triumph TR7 V8							FIN; 22	NZL	ITA	FRA				35th	7
1980	Rothmans Rally Team	Ford Escort RS1800											GBR; 6			35th	7
1981	Marshalls	Peugeot 504 V6 Coupé	MON	SWE	POR	KEN; Ret	FRA	GRE	ARG	BRA	FIN	ITA	CIV	GBR		NC	0
1994	Timo Mäkinen	Rover Mini Cooper	MON; Ret	POR	KEN	FRA	GRE	ARG	NZL	FIN	ITA	GBR				NC	0

=== Complete British Saloon Car Championship results ===
(key) (Races in bold indicate pole position; races in italics indicate fastest lap.)

Year	Team	Car	Class	1	2	3	4	5	6	7	8	Pos.	Pts	Class
1964	Don Moore	Morris Mini Cooper S	A	SNE	GOO	OUL	AIN	SIL	CRY	BRH ovr:9 cls:3	OUL	21st	4	9th

=== Complete Bathurst 500 results ===
Year	Team	Co-Drivers	Car	Class	Laps	Pos.	Class Pos.
1965	(Australia) BMC	(United Kingdom) Paddy Hopkirk	Morris Cooper S	C	128	6th	3rd
1967	(Australia) BMC Works Team	(Australia) John French	Morris Cooper S	C	127	7th	3rd

== International wins ==
- 1964 Tulip Rally (Mini Cooper S)
- 1965 Monte Carlo Rally (Mini Cooper S)
- 1965 1000 Lakes Rally (Mini Cooper S)
- 1966 1000 Lakes Rally (Mini Cooper S)
- 1966 Three Cities Rally (Mini Cooper S)
- 1967 1000 Lakes Rally (Mini Cooper S)
- 1972 Hong Kong Rally (Ford Escort RS1600)
- 1973 Arctic Rally (Ford Escort RS1600)
- 1973 1000 Lakes Rally (Ford Escort RS1600)
- 1973 RAC Rally (Ford Escort RS1600)
- 1974 RAC Rally (Ford Escort RS1600)
- 1974 Rallye Côte d'Ivoire (Ford Escort RS1600)
- 1975 RAC Rally (Ford Escort RS1800)
- 1976 Rallye Côte d'Ivoire (Peugeot 504 V6)
