= Ian Appleyard =

British rally driver, alpine skier and ornithologist

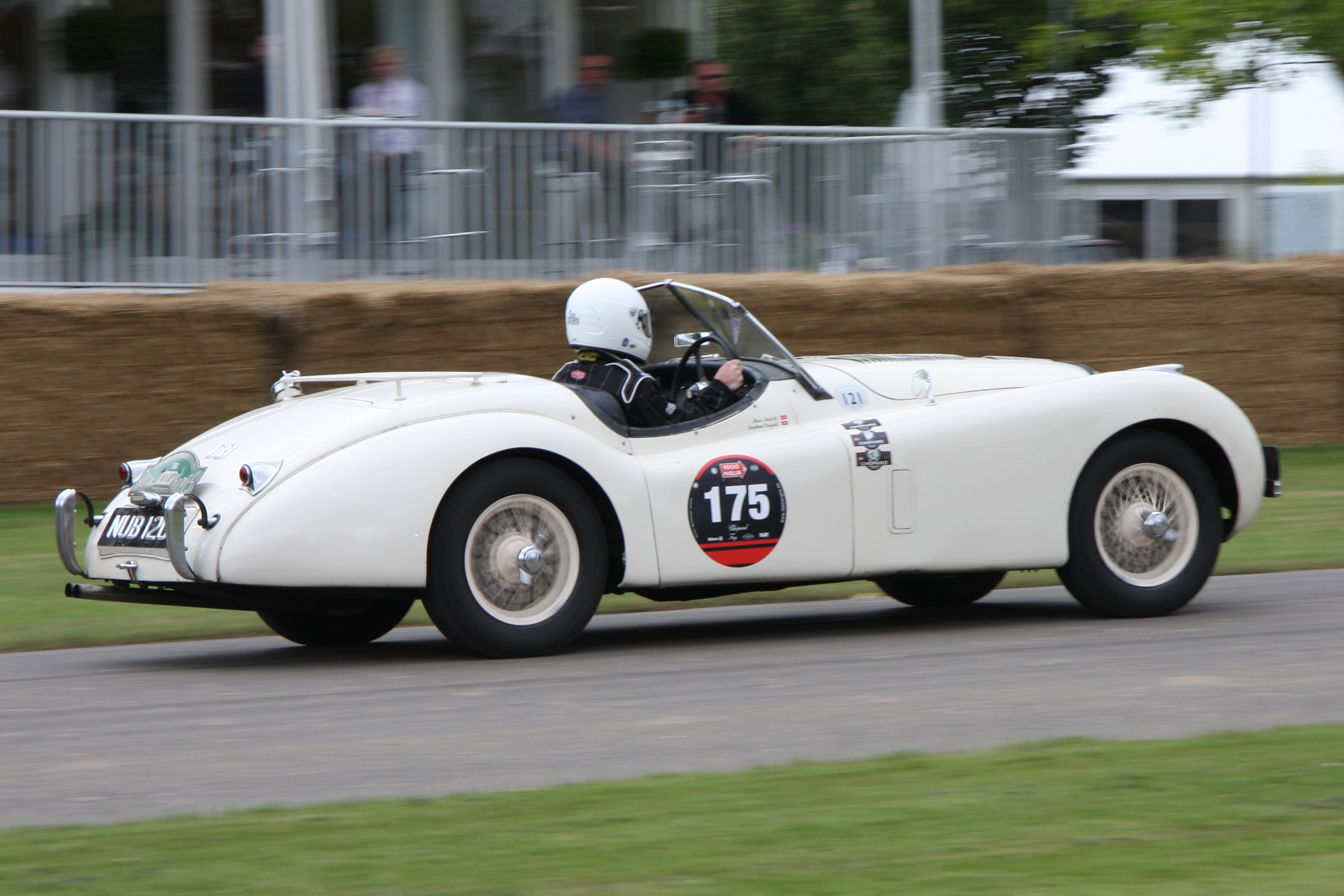
- Appleyard's Coupe d'Or-winning "NUB 120" Jaguar XK120 driven at the Goodwood Festival of Speed.
- Born: 10 October 1923; Linton, West Yorkshire, England
- Died: 2 June 1998 (aged 74); Harrogate, North Yorkshire, England

Ernest Ian Appleyard (10 October 1923 – 2 June 1998) was a British rally driver, alpine skier and ornithologist. Driving a Jaguar XK120, he won the RAC Rally in 1951 and 1953, the Tulip Rally in 1951 and a Coupe d'Or at the Alpine Rally in 1952. In alpine skiing, he competed for Great Britain in the 1948 Winter Olympic Games. After retiring from sports, he became a leading author on the ring ouzel.

== Biography ==
Appleyard was born in Linton, West Yorkshire, in 1923. As a child, he shared an interest in birds and alpine skiing with his brother Geoffrey, who died on an SAS mission during World War II. Ian received his degree in mechanical engineering in 1943 and went on to become a Major at the Royal Military College of Science. In 1946, he accepted a job as a director of the family car dealership Appleyard of Leeds.

The following year, Appleyard finished third in his class at the Alpine Rally in a Jaguar SS100. In 1948, he received factory support from Jaguar Cars. Despite stopping to help an injured rival, he met all the target times and was awarded his first Coupe des Alpes (Alpine Cup). That same year, he competed in the Winter Olympics and finished 55th in men's slalom and 91st in men's downhill. At the wheel of an XK120 and with his wife Patricia "Pat" Lyons, the daughter of Jaguar founder Sir William Lyons, as his co-driver, Appleyard finished the Alpine Rally unpenalized three times in a row from 1950 to 1952, becoming the first driver to win the coveted Coupe d'Or (Gold Cup). Only two drivers would match this feat; Stirling Moss in 1954 and Jean Vinatier in 1971.

Appleyard went on to take his fifth Coupe des Alpes in 1953, but achieved success in other rallies as well. In the Netherlands, he drove to victory in the Tulip Rally in 1951, after having finished second two years earlier. In his home country, he won the RAC Rally in 1951 and 1953. In 1953, Appleyard also finished runner-up in the Monte Carlo Rally and the inaugural European Rally Championship. He later continued in motorsport more sporadically, taking second place in the 1956 RAC in an XK140.

After retiring from rallying, Appleyard chaired the Appleyard Group until 1988. He also rekindled his interest in birds and started studying the ring ouzel in 1978, eventually becoming a leading author on the subject. In 1994, he released a book titled Ring Ouzels of the Yorkshire Dales. Appleyard died in Harrogate, North Yorkshire, in 1998. An obituary in The Independent wrote that "in his gleaming white Jaguar XK120, he became a sporting icon for his generation."
