= Tony Ambrose =

British rally driver

John Anthony Ambrose (12 August 1933 – 5 January 2008) was a British rally driver who, as co-driver, twice won the RAC Rally, in 1956 and 1965.

== Early life and Oxford University ==
Ambrose was born in Chipping Norton, Oxfordshire, where his father owned a farm machinery business, and attended the local grammar school. This business entitled his father to a supplementary allowance for fuel, which was rationed during the Second World War. Ambrose learnt to drive by accompanying his father on his visits to farms, initially sitting on his father's lap to steer whilst his father operated the pedals, and learning map-reading skills (signposts having been removed from roads for fear of invasion).

His father promised to buy him a car if he obtained a scholarship to Oxford University. Ambrose won a scholarship in 1951 to read engineering at Jesus College, Oxford, and he was given a red MG TC car by his father as promised. However, he was not permitted by university rules to keep a car in Oxford whilst he was in his first academic year. Nevertheless, he made friends with other university motor sports enthusiasts and competed in events and rallies outside the university, sometimes in partnership with his elder brother Norman (who had read physics at Jesus College from 1943 to 1945). In 1952, the brothers were part of the Oxford team for the Annual Varsity Rally, but lost to a Cambridge University team that included Archie Scott Brown.

In the Trinity term of 1952, Ambrose and another Oxford driver, David Hamilton, approached the Proctors for permission to reactivate the university's Motor Drivers' Club, which had been banned before Ambrose started at Oxford for organising a race on public roads between Oxford and Marble Arch in London. He obtained support from Earl Howe and Sir Miles Thomas, both former members of the club. The Proctors gave their permission for the club to be refounded, and it went on to be a source of strength for British rally driving in the 1960s. Ambrose became Secretary, and later President; Earl Howe and Sir Miles Thomas became honorary Vice Presidents.

== Rally driving career and later life ==
After leaving Oxford, Ambrose joined the Royal Air Force but continued to compete in rallies. In 1956, he won the RAC Rally with Lyndon Sims in an Aston Martin DB2. He joined the BMC rally team in 1959, co-driving for Alec Pitts, Peter Riley and David Seigle-Morris before BMC Competitions Manager Stuart Turner paired him with Rauno Aaltonen. While paired with Peter Riley they devised descriptive route notes "pacenotes" to improve both speed and safety in rallying. A concept developed further with Aaltonen. Despite many podium finishes on European rallies, a long-held ambition to win a Liege in an Austin-Healey 3000 proved elusive until 1964, when he co-drove with Rauno Aaltonen to win the last Spa-Sofia-Liege, an event lasting four days and nights with no scheduled sleep time. Aaltonen later recalled how Ambrose had driven 77 miles (124 km) at night in just 52 minutes, reaching speeds of 150 miles (241 km) per hour over cobblestone roads whilst Aaltonen slept in the car. The following year they won the 1965 European Rally Championship title, including victory at the RAC Rally in a Mini Cooper 1275S. the first and only time that a Mini has won that event.

Ambrose left the BMC team in 1966 to spend more time with his family and his business. His last rally with BMC was the 1966 RAC Rally, with Simo Lampinen, although an accident meant that they had to stop. Ambrose then became a key part of the organising team for the 1968 London-Sydney Marathon and the 1970 London-Mexico Rally conducting reconnaissance and planning of both routes as well as on event management. His last two rallies were both with Rauno Aaltonen - 1969 Tour de Corse in a BMW 2002 tii finishing 7th overall / Gp2 class win and finally the 1969 RAC Rally GB Datsun 1600SSS Coupe finishing 8th overall. Businesses that he was involved with included a family-run decorating firm and a pub in Wales. Ambrose died in Newbury, Berkshire on 5 January 2008.

Tony's autobiography was published in 2019, having been edited by his nephew Philip Ambrose
