= Rauno Aaltonen =

Finnish rally driver (born 1938)

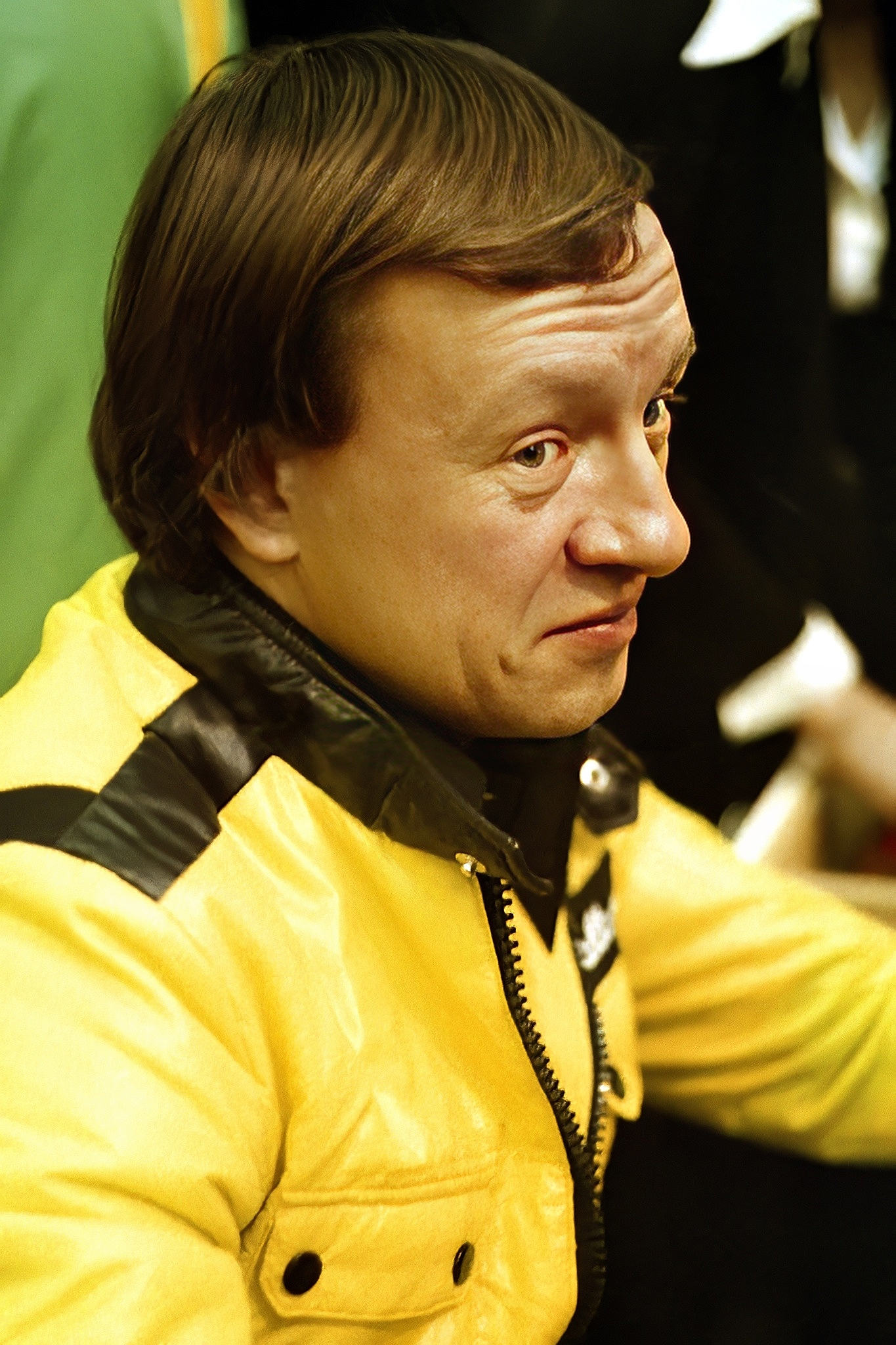
- Aaltonen in the late 1970s

Personal information
- Nationality: (Finland) Finnish
- Full name: Rauno August Aaltonen
- Born: 7 January 1938 (age 88); Turku, Finland

World Rally Championship record
- Years active: 1973–1987
- Co-driver: (United Kingdom) Paul Easter (United Kingdom) John Davenport (United Kingdom) Robin Turvey (West Germany) Wolfgang Stiller (West Germany) Edgar Herrmann (Sweden) Claes Billstam (West Germany) Willi-Peter Pitz (Kenya) Lofty Drews (United Kingdom) Kevin Gormley
- Teams: Datsun, Fiat, Opel
- Rallies: 26
- Rally wins: 0
- Podiums: 6
- Stage wins: 11
- Total points: 65
- First rally: 1973 Monte Carlo Rally
- Last rally: 1987 Safari Rally

Rauno August Aaltonen (born 7 January 1938), is a former Finnish professional rally driver who competed in the World Rally Championship among its pioneering "Flying Finns" throughout the 1970s. Nicknamed "The Professor", he is also the first Finn to win a (non-FIM-sanctioned) Grand Prix motorcycle race and, in 1966, the first non-Australian to achieve victory in what is now called the Bathurst 1000.

== Career ==
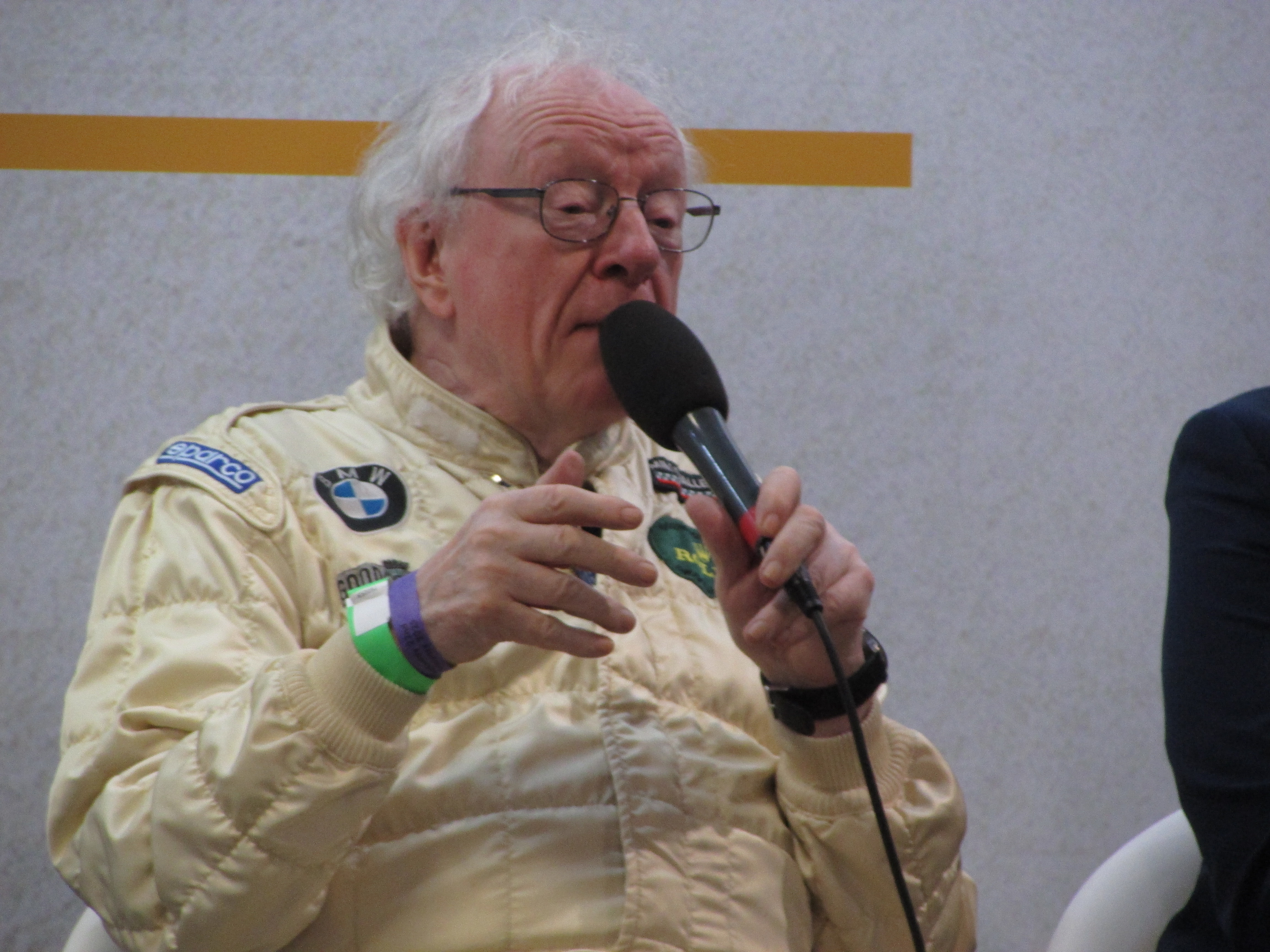
Aaltonen in 2025

Before the WRC was established, Aaltonen competed in the European Rally Championship, conquering the championship in 1965 with Tony Ambrose as his co-driver. He also won the Finnish Rally Championship in 1961 and 1965. In 1966, he partnered Bob Holden in a Mini Cooper S to win the Gallacher 500 at Mount Panorama.

Aaltonen finished second on six occasions in the notorious Safari Rally; in 1985, he was leading the rally by two hours when his engine broke down before the last few special stages. His other merits include winning the 1000 Lakes Rally in 1961, the RAC Rally in 1965, the Monte Carlo Rally in 1967, the Southern Cross Rally in 1977 and a Coupe des Alpes at the Alpine Rally in 1963 and 1964.

Aaltonen was a proponent of left-foot braking. In 2010, he was among the first four inductees into the Rally Hall of Fame, along with Erik Carlsson, Paddy Hopkirk and Timo Mäkinen.

The technique of rotating a car by 360 degrees, while maintaining trajectory, was named after Aaltonen.

== Career results ==
=== Complete IMC results ===
Year	Entrant	Car	1	2	3	4	5	6	7	8	9
1970	Ford Deutschland	Ford Capri RS2600	MON	SWE	ITA	KEN; Ret	AUT	GRE			
1970	Nissan Datsun	Datsun 240Z							GBR; 7		
1971	Yhtymä Oy Autokeskus	Datsun 240Z	MON; 5	SWE	ITA						
1971	Nissan Motor Co. Ltd.	Datsun 240Z				KEN; 7	MAR				
1971	Nissan Europe Rally Team	Datsun 240Z									GBR; Ret
1971	BMW AG	BMW 2002 TI						AUT; Ret	GRE	FRA	
1972	Nissan Motor Co. Ltd.	Datsun 240Z	MON; 3	SWE	KEN; 6						
1972	Nissan Europe Rally Team	Datsun 240Z									GBR; 11
1972	Citroën Compétitions	Citroën SM				MAR; Ret					
1972	Sears Roebuck Ltd	BMW 2002 TI					GRE; Ret				
1972	BMW AG	BMW 3.0 CSL						AUT; Ret	ITA	USA	

=== Complete WRC results ===
Year	Entrant	Car	1	2	3	4	5	6	7	8	9	10	11	12	13	WDC	Points
1973	Nissan Motor Co. Ltd.	Datsun 240Z	MON; 18	SWE	POR	KEN; Ret										N/A	N/A
1973	Fiat S.p.A	Fiat 124 Abarth Spider					MOR; Ret	GRE; 2	POL	FIN	AUT	ITA	USA			N/A	N/A
1973	Irmscher Tuning	Opel Ascona												GBR; Ret	FRA	N/A	N/A
1974	African Roadways Ltd	Datsun 1800 SSS	POR	KEN; 6	FIN	ITA	CAN	USA								N/A	N/A
1974	Fiat S.p.A	Fiat 124 Abarth Spider							GBR; 12	FRA						N/A	N/A
1975	Opel Euro Händler Team	Opel Ascona	MON	SWE	KEN; Ret	GRC; Ret	MOR; Ret	POR; 4	FIN	ITA; Ret	FRA					N/A	N/A
1975	Opel Euro Händler Team	Opel Kadett GT/E										GBR; Ret				N/A	N/A
1976	Opel Euro Händler Team	Opel Kadett GT/E	MON	SWE	POR	KEN; Ret	GRC	MOR	FIN	ITA	FRA	GBR; Ret				N/A	N/A
1977	D.T. Dobie & Co (EA) Ltd	Datsun 160J	MON	SWE	POR	KEN; 2	NZL	GRC	FIN	CAN	ITA	FRA	GBR			N/A	N/A
1978	D.T. Dobie & Co (EA) Ltd	Datsun 160J	MON	SWE	KEN; 3	POR	GRC	FIN	CAN	ITA	CIV	FRA	GBR			N/A	N/A
1979	D.T. Dobie / Team Datsun	Datsun 160J	MON	SWE	POR	KEN; 5	GRC	NZL	FIN	CAN	ITA	FRA	GBR	CIV		28th	8
1980	D.T. Dobie / Team Datsun	Datsun 160J	MON	SWE	POR	KEN; 2	GRC	ARG	FIN	NZL	ITA	FRA	GBR	CIV		16th	15
1981	D.T. Dobie / Team Datsun	Datsun 160J	MON; 13	SWE	POR											19th	15
1981	D.T. Dobie / Team Datsun	Datsun Violet GT				KEN; 2	FRA	GRC	ARG	BRA	FIN	ITA	CIV	GBR		19th	15
1982	Rothmans Opel Rally Team	Opel Ascona 400	MON	SWE	POR	KEN; Ret	FRA	GRC	NZL	BRA	FIN	ITA	CIV	GBR		NC	0
1983	Rothmans Opel Rally Team	Opel Ascona 400	MON	SWE	POR	KEN; Ret	FRA	GRC	NZL	ARG	FIN	ITA	CIV	GBR		NC	0
1984	Opel Euro Team	Opel Ascona 400	MON	SWE	POR	KEN; 2	FRA	GRC	NZL	ARG	FIN	ITA	CIV	GBR		15th	15
1985	Opel Euro Team	Opel Ascona 400	MON	SWE	POR	KEN; 4	FRA	GRC	NZL	ARG	FIN	ITA	CIV	GBR		22nd	10
1987	GM Euro Sport	Opel Kadett GSi	MON	SWE	POR	KEN; 9	FRA	GRC	USA	NZL	ARG	FIN	CIV	ITA	GBR	58th	2

=== Complete 24 Hours of Le Mans results ===
Year	Team	Co-Drivers	Car	Class	Laps	Pos.	Class Pos.
1964	(United Kingdom) Donald Healey Motor Company	(United Kingdom) Clive Baker	Austin-Healey Sebring Sprite	P 1.5	256	DNF	DNF

=== Complete Bathurst 500/1000 results ===
Year	Team	Co-drivers	Car	Class	Laps	Pos.	Class pos.
1966	BMC Australia	(Australia) Bob Holden	Morris Cooper S	C	130	1st	1st
1991	(Australia) Bob Holden Motors	(Australia) Bob Holden (Australia) Dennis Rogers	Toyota Corolla	3	124	20th	4th

=== Complete British Saloon Car Championship results ===
(key) (Races in bold indicate pole position; races in italics indicate fastest lap.)

Year	Team	Car	Class	1	2	3	4	5	6	7	8	9	10	11	12	Pos.	Pts	Class
1970	Ford Köln	Ford Capri 2300 GT	D	BRH	SNE	THR	SIL	CRY	SIL	SIL ovr:27 cls:8	CRO	BRH	OUL	BRH	BRH	NC	0	NC

== Gallery ==
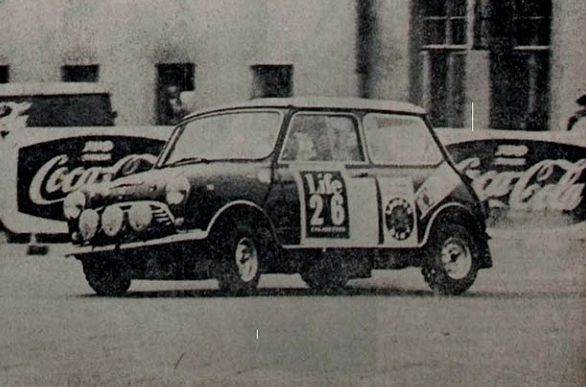
Aaltonen at the 1965 1000 Lakes Rally

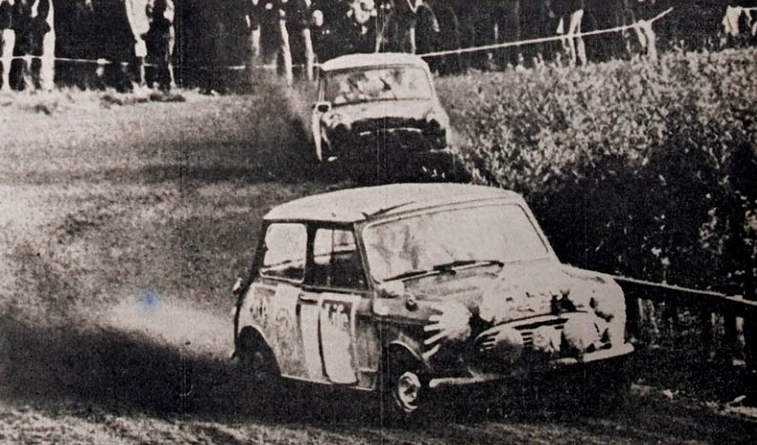
Aaltonen behind Timo Mäkinen at the 1000 Lakes

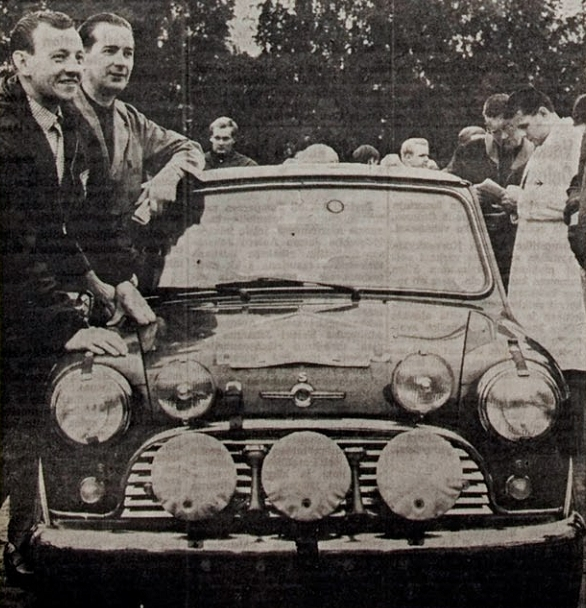
Aaltonen with co-driver Anssi Järvi

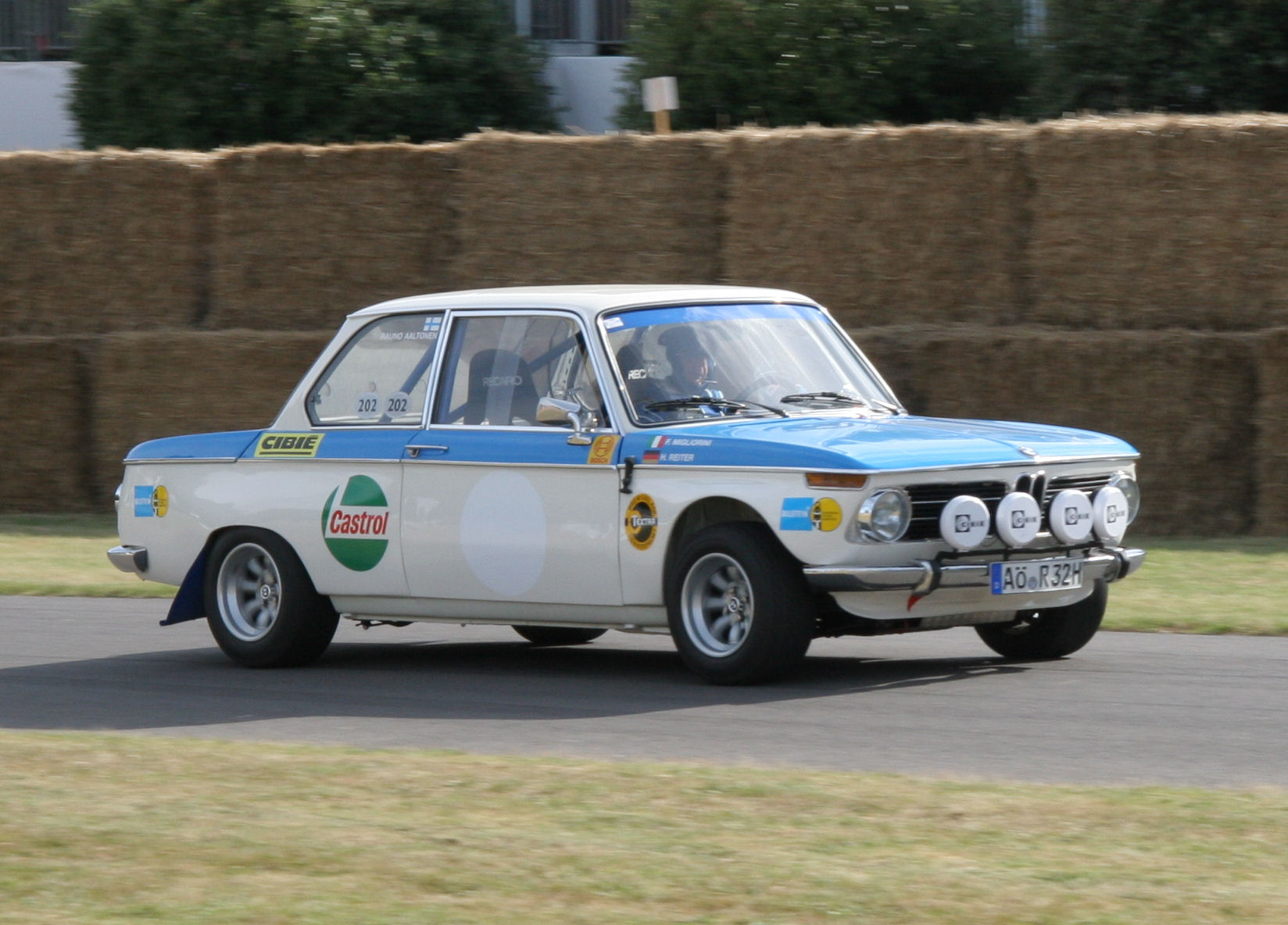
An ex-Aaltonen BMW 2002tii

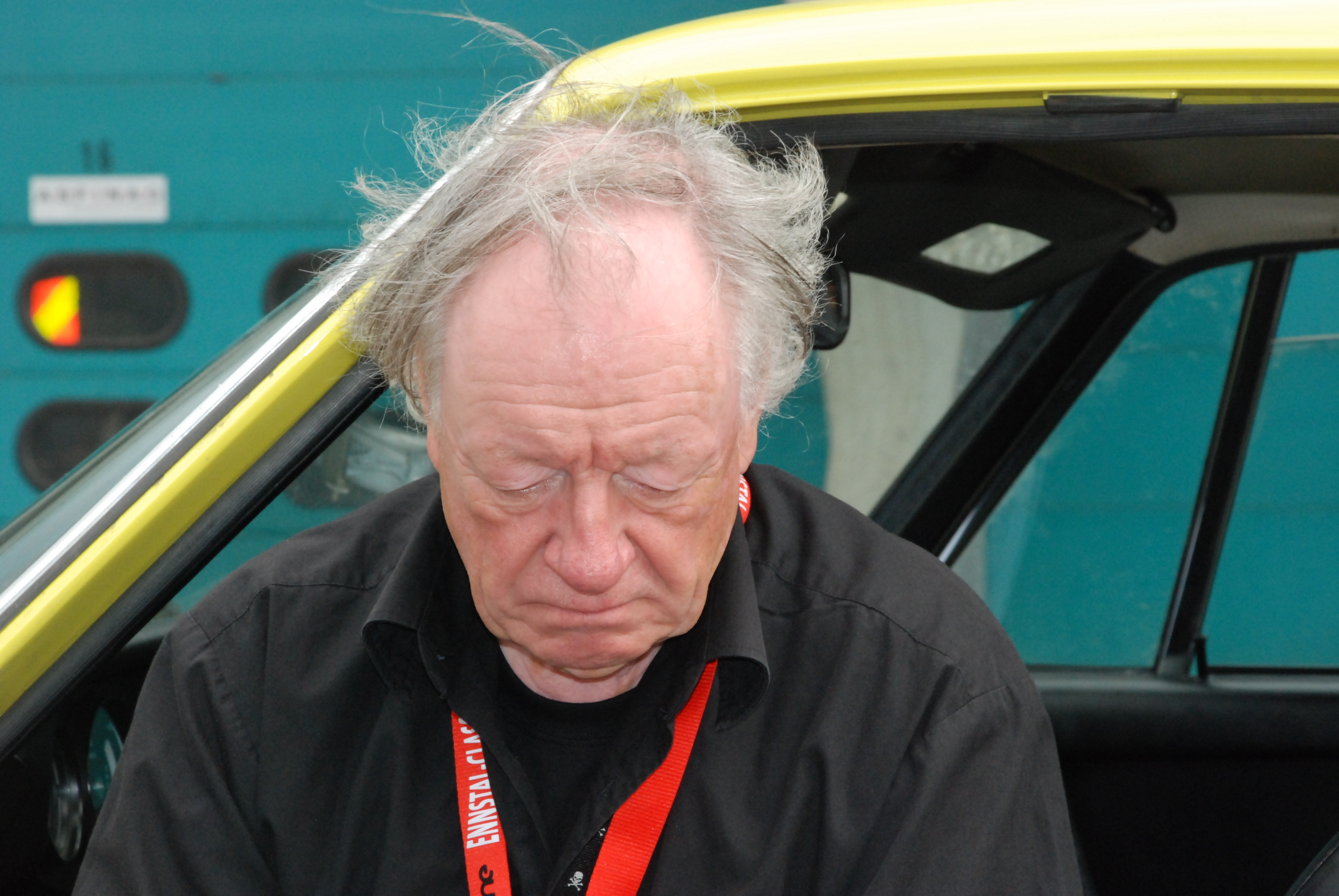
Aaltonen pictured in 2008

Sporting positions
Preceded by Tom Trana	European Rally Champion; 1965	Succeeded by G1: Lillebror Nasenius; G2: Sobiesław Zasada; G3: Günter Klass
Preceded by Barry Seton; Midge Bosworth	Winner of the Bathurst 500; 1966 (with Bob Holden)	Succeeded by Harry Firth; Fred Gibson
