= Alpine Rally =

Rally competition based in Marseille

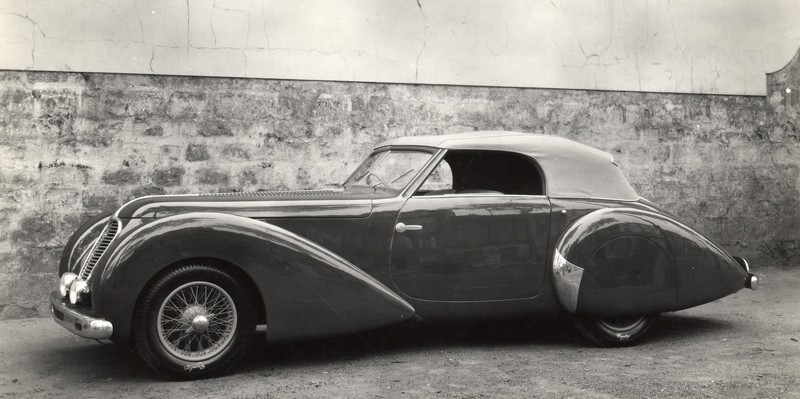
The Delahaye 135 was nicknamed the "Coupe des Alpes" model due to the car's success in the event.

The Alpine Rally, also known by its official name Coupe des Alpes, was a rally competition based in Marseille and held from 1932 to 1971. In the 1950s and the 1960s, it was among the most prestigious rallies in the world and featured an international route, consisting of famous mountain passes in Europe.

== History ==
The rally was first held in 1932 under the name Rallye des Alpes Françaises. After World War II, it continued as the Rallye International des Alpes in 1946. Although the event still started and finished in France, the route became international in 1948 and until 1965 featured famous mountain passes in Austria, Germany, Italy and Switzerland. In 1953, the Alpine Rally was included in the inaugural European Rally Championship (ERC) calendar. The rally was very popular during its heyday; Autocar wrote in 1958 that "without doubt, the Alpine Rally was one of the most formidable motoring events of any type in the international calendar." The car manufacturer Alpine was named after the event in 1955, as was Sunbeam's sports car Alpine in 1953.

In the late 1960s, the organisers ran into a dispute over the rally route and insisted on allowing prototypes for the 1968 and 1969 events. This decision dropped the rally from the ERC calendar and weakened its status internationally, which led to reduced sponsorship money and high entry fees. The 1970 rally was cancelled after Esso withdrew sponsorship. With BP as the new sponsor, the Alpine Rally was part of the 1971 International Championship for Manufacturers, the predecessor to the World Rally Championship, but attracted only 36 starters. As the FIA minimum was 50, no points were awarded towards the championship.

== Trophies ==
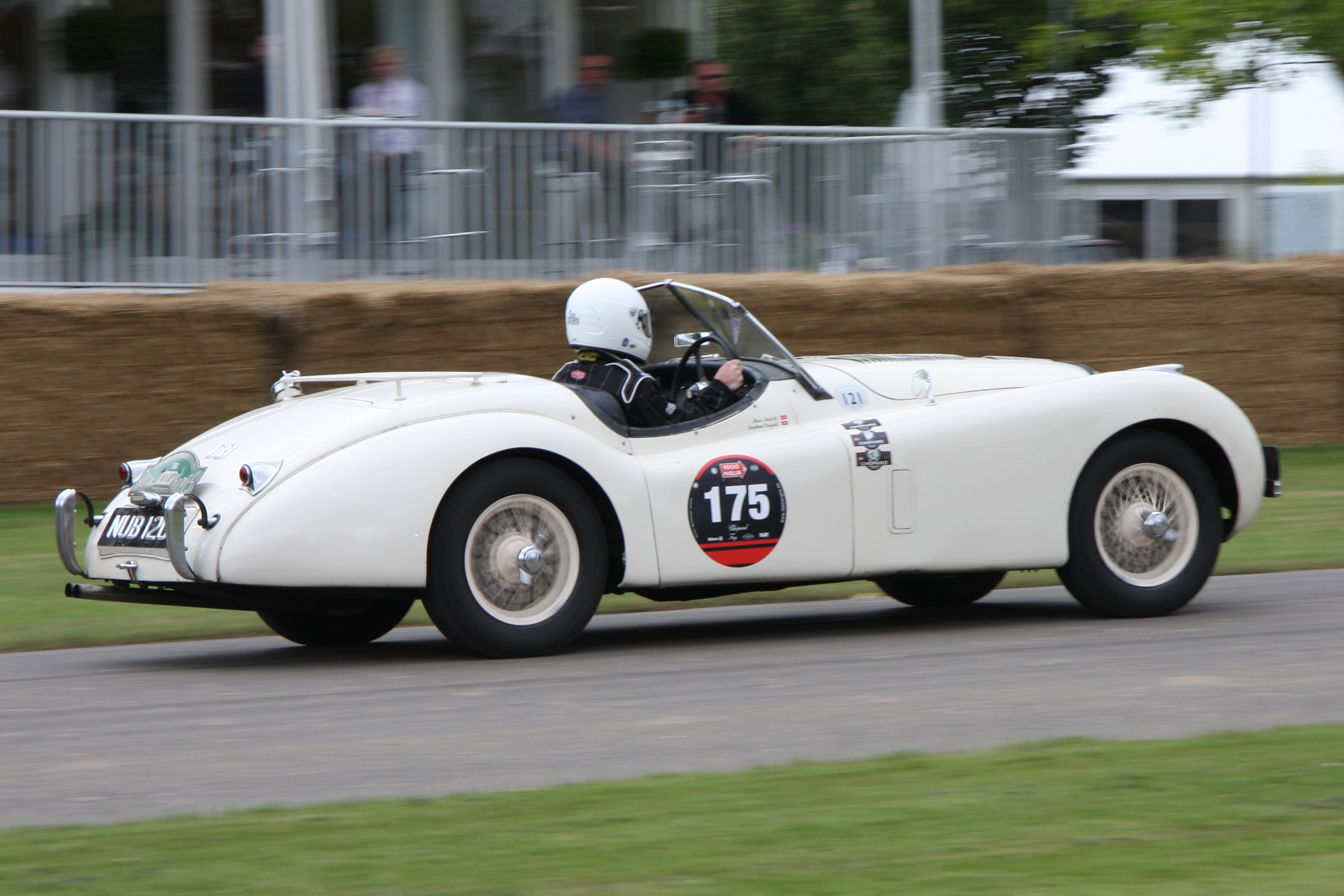
Ian Appleyard's Coupe d'Or-winning Jaguar XK120 driven at the Goodwood Festival of Speed.

The rally awarded a much-coveted Coupe des Alpes (Alpine Cup) to all the competitors who finished the event unpenalized, meeting all the target times. Coupe d'Or (Gold Cup) was awarded to those who managed three such feats in a row. Coupe d'Argent (Silver Cup) was given to drivers who took three Cups non-consecutively.

The Coupe des Alpes was awarded 166 times from 1938 to 1971. Recipients included Mike Hawthorn (1952), Jean Rédélé (1954), Pat Moss (1960 and 1962), Rauno Aaltonen (1963 and 1964), Erik Carlsson (1964), Vic Elford (1964), Tony Fall (1965), Timo Mäkinen (1965), Lucien Bianchi (1966), Roger Clark (1966), Jean-Pierre Nicolas (1966 and 1969), Harry Källström (1967 and 1969), Jean-Claude Andruet (1969) and Bernard Darniche (1971).

The Coupe d'Argent was awarded to five drivers; Maurice Gatsonides (1956), driving for Jaguar and Triumph, René Trautmann of Citroën (1963), Donald Morley of Austin-Healey (1964), Paddy Hopkirk (1965), who drove for Triumph, Sunbeam and Mini-Cooper, and Jean Rolland of Alfa Romeo (1966).

Only three drivers won the Coupe d'Or; Jaguar's Ian Appleyard (1952), Sunbeam-Talbot's Stirling Moss (1954) and Alpine's Jean Vinatier (1971).

== Overall winners 1952–1971 ==
| Year | Driver | Car |
|---|---|---|
| 1952 | (Germany) Alex von Falkenhausen | BMW 328 |
| 1953 | (Germany) Helmut Polensky | Porsche 356 1500 S |
| 1954 | (Austria) Wolfgang Denzel | Denzel 1300 |
| 1955 | Cancelled due to the Le Mans disaster. | |
| 1956 | (France) Michel Collange | Alfa Romeo Giulietta |
| 1957 | Cancelled due to the Suez Crisis. | |
| 1958 | (France) Bernard Consten | Alfa Romeo Giulietta |
| 1959 | (France) Paul Condrillier | Renault Dauphine |
| 1960 | (France) Roger de Lageneste | Alfa Romeo Giulietta |
| 1961 | (United Kingdom) Donald Morley | Austin-Healey 3000 |
| 1962 | (United Kingdom) Donald Morley | Austin-Healey 3000 |
| 1963 | (France) Jean Rolland | Alfa Romeo Giulietta |
| 1964 | (France) Jean Rolland | Alfa Romeo Giulia TZ |
| 1965 | (France) René Trautmann | Lancia Flavia Zagato |
| 1966 | (France) Jean Rolland | Alfa Romeo GTA |
| 1967 | (United Kingdom) Paddy Hopkirk | Mini Cooper S |
| 1968 | (France) Jean Vinatier | Alpine-Renault A110 1440 |
| 1969 | (France) Jean Vinatier | Alpine-Renault A110 1600S |
| 1970 | Cancelled due to the lack of sponsorship. | |
| 1971 | (France) Bernard Darniche | Alpine-Renault A110 1600S |
