= Pat Moss =

British rally driver (1934–2008)

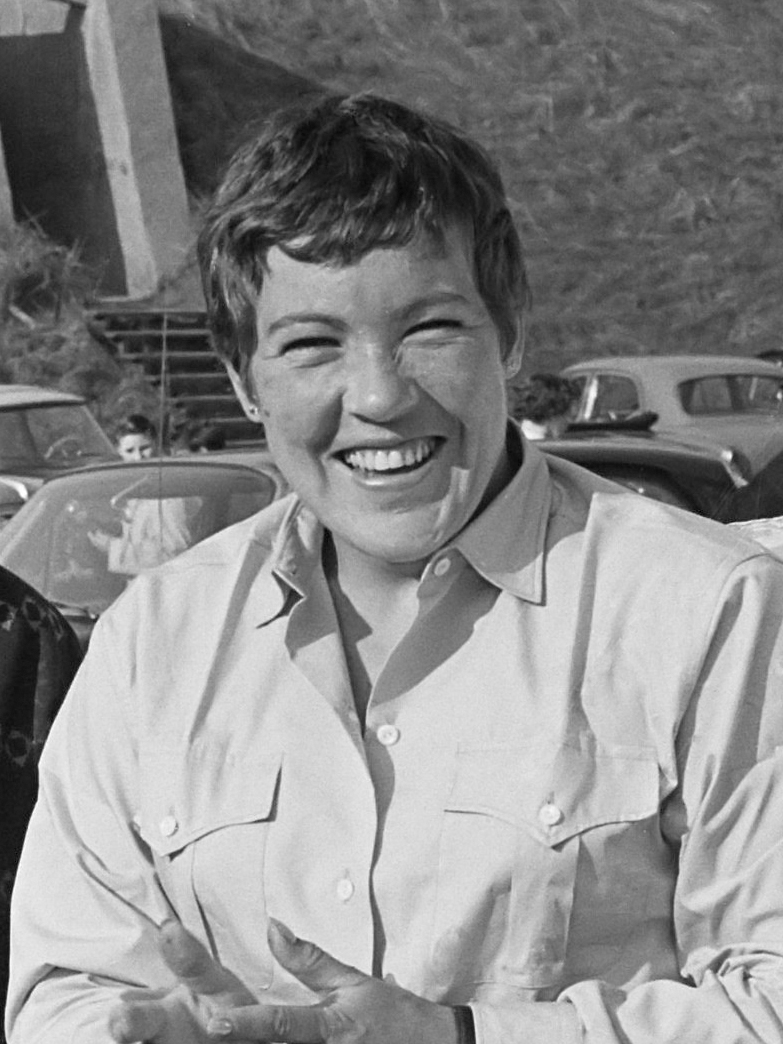
- Moss in 1963
- Born: Patricia Ann Moss; 27 December 1934; Thames Ditton, Surrey
- Died: 14 October 2008 (aged 73)
- Occupation: Auto Rally Driver
- Spouse: Erik Carlsson (m. 1963–2008; her death)
- Parent(s): Alfred Moss; Aileen (née Craufurd)
- Relatives: Sir Stirling Moss (brother)

Patricia Ann Moss-Carlsson (née Moss; 27 December 1934 – 14 October 2008) was one of the most successful female auto rally drivers of all time, achieving three outright wins and seven podium finishes in international rallies. She was crowned European Ladies' Rally Champion five times (1958, 1960, 1962, 1964–65). Her older brother Stirling Moss was a Formula One Grand Prix star during the 1950s. From 1963 until her death in 2008, Swedish rally driver Erik Carlsson was both her driving-partner and her husband.

She is the author of a memoir The Story So Far (1967) and, with her husband, co-author of The Art and Technique of Driving (1965).

== Biography ==
Pat Moss was born in Thames Ditton, Surrey, England, to British racing driver Alfred Moss and Aileen (née Craufurd). She grew up in Bray, Berkshire and was taught to drive at the age of 11 by her brother, Stirling. But she started her sporting career on horseback, becoming well known as a successful show-jumper and member of the British showjumping team. In 1953, aged 18, she started driving in club rallies after being introduced to the sport by boyfriend Ken Gregory, Stirling's manager. In 1954, Moss bought a Triumph TR2 and started rallying more seriously. She asked Standard-Triumph to cover her expenses to drive her TR2 on the 1955 RAC Rally, but they declined.

A more astute MG Cars offered Moss expenses and a works MG TF 1500. Thus began a relationship lasting seven years, netting three championships and benefiting the British Motor Corporation with valuable publicity. As a BMC works team driver, Moss had her breakthrough in 1958, when she drove her Morris Minor to 4th place on the RAC Rally. She achieved another 4th place at Belgium's Liège–Rome–Liège Rally in an Austin-Healey 100/6 and won the first of her five European Ladies' Rally Championships.

In 1960, Moss took over-all victory at the Liège–Rome–Liège in an Austin-Healey 3000 and went on to finish 2nd at the Coupe des Alpes. In 1961, she finished 2nd at the RAC Rally. In 1962, she was 3rd at the East African Safari Rally in a Saab 96 and, at the RAC, with the Austin-Healey. Her biggest achievement, however, was winning the Netherlands' Tulip Rally in a Mini Cooper, which Moss considered "twitchy, and pretty unruly on the limit".

In 1963, Moss joined Ford of Britain and managed a 6th place at the Acropolis Rally in her Lotus-tuned Ford Cortina. On 9 July 1963 she married fellow rally driver Erik Carlsson. Ford tried to sign Erik; instead, in 1964, Moss switched to Saab works team to partner her husband. Together, they competed in 11 international rallies. Her most notable results were 3rd at the Acropolis Rally and 4th at the Liège–Sofia–Liège and the RAC Rally. At the Monte Carlo Rally, she came in 5th in 1964 and 3rd in 1965.

In 1968, Moss joined Lancia to drive the new Fulvia. She did not like the car's strong understeer, but drove it to 14th place at the Monte Carlo Rally and 2nd place at the Rallye Sanremo, losing to Pauli Toivonen in a Porsche 911. Her other notable results of the season included winning the Sestriere Rally and finishing 8th at the Acropolis and 7th at the Tour de Corse. At the 1969 Monte Carlo Rally, Moss drove her Fulvia to 6th place.

In December 1969, Moss and Carlsson had a daughter, Susan. By that time, Moss was becoming less active in rallying; she joined Renault Alpine and drove her Alpine A110 to 10th place at the 1972 Monte Carlo Rally before finally retiring in 1974.

On 14 October 2008, Moss-Carlsson died of cancer, aged 73, at home in Eaton Bray, Bedfordshire. She was survived by her husband Erik and daughter Susan.

== See also ==
- List of female World Rally Championship drivers
