= 1974 RAC Rally =

1974 RAC Rally 30th Lombard RAC Rally
Round 7 of the 1974 World Rally Championship season
← Previous event	Next event →
- Host country: United Kingdom
- Rally base: York
- Dates run: 16 November – 20 November 1974
- Stages: 84
- Stage surface: Gravel
- Overall distance: 2,218.00 km (1,378.20 miles) (approx.)

Statistics
- Crews: 190 at start, 83 at finish

Overall results
- Overall winner: (Finland) Timo Mäkinen (United Kingdom) Henry Liddon (United Kingdom) Ford Escort RS1600

The 1974 RAC Rally (formally the 30th Lombard RAC Rally) was the seventh round of the 1974 World Rally Championship season. It ran between November 16 and November 20. The event was sponsored by the finance company Lombard North Central.

== Report ==
The event was won by Finnish driver Timo Mäkinen and his British co-driver Henry Liddon, making it the second time in a row that the driver has won, followed by the Swedes Stig Blomqvist and Hans Sylvan and the Italians Sandro Munari and Piero Sodano. The race took place in York, in the north of England, and was sponsored by the financial company Lombard North Central.

== Results ==
Pos.	#	Driver and Co-driver	Car	Time	Points
1974 RAC Rally results
1.	1	(Finland) Timo Mäkinen (United Kingdom) Henry Liddon	(United Kingdom) Ford Escort RS1600	8:02:39	20
2.	2	(Sweden) Stig Blomqvist (Sweden) Hans Sylvan	(Sweden) Saab 96 V4	8:04:19	15
3.	3	(Italy) Sandro Munari (Italy) Piero Sodano	(Italy) Lancia Stratos HF	8:11:55	12
4.	9	(Sweden) Björn Waldegård (Sweden) Hans Thorszelius	(Japan) Toyota Corolla Levin TE27	8:13:54	10
5.	4	(Germany) Walter Röhrl (Germany) Jochen Berger	(Germany) Opel Ascona 1.9 SR	8:15:52	8
6.	6	(Sweden) Per-Inge Walfridsson (United Kingdom) John Jensen	(Sweden) Volvo 142	8:16:09	6
7.	5	(United Kingdom) Roger Clark (United Kingdom) Tony Mason	(United Kingdom) Ford Escort RS1600	8:19:06	
8.	23	(Republic of Ireland) Billy Coleman (Republic of Ireland) Dan O'Sullivan	(United Kingdom) Ford Escort RS1600	8:20:29	
9.	20	(United Kingdom) Chris Sclater (United Kingdom) Martin Holmes	(Japan) Datsun Violet	8:21:56	2
10.	11	(Finland) Simo Lampinen (Sweden) Sölve Andreasson	(Italy) Lancia Beta Coupé	8:21:57	
11.	46	(United Kingdom) Nigel Rockey (United Kingdom) Ron Channon	(United Kingdom) Ford Escort RS1600	8:22:20	
12.	8	(Finland) Rauno Aaltonen (United Kingdom) Paul Easter	(Italy) Fiat 124 Abarth Rallye	8:26:32	
13.	17	(Finland) Tapio Rainio (Finland) Klaus Lehto	(Sweden) Saab 96 V4	8:27:58	
14.	16	(Finland) Leo Kinnunen (Finland) Atso Aho	(Italy) Fiat 124 Abarth Rallye	8:30:11	
15.	13	(Sweden) Harry Källström (Sweden) Claes Billstam	(Japan) Datsun 160J	8:31:31	
16.	32	(United Kingdom) Will Sparrow (United Kingdom) Ronald Crellin	(United Kingdom) Vauxhall Magnum Coupé	8:33:14	
17.	85	(Germany) Wolfgang Hauck (Germany) Hermann Weidmann	(Germany) Porsche 911 Carrera RS	8:38:51	
18.	44	(United Kingdom) Jimmy Rae (United Kingdom) Les Marshall	(United Kingdom) Ford Escort RS1600	8:39:27	
19.	76	(United Kingdom) John Bloxham (United Kingdom) Ron Harper	(United Kingdom) Triumph Dolomite Sprint	8:39:30	
20.	34	(United Kingdom) Paul Faulkner (United Kingdom) Monty Peters	(Japan) Datsun 160J	8:42:02	
21.	62	(Sweden) Ruben Börjesson (United Kingdom) Joe Hawkins	(Germany) Opel Ascona 1.9 SR	8:44:20	
22.	57	(Norway) John Haugland (Norway) Arild Antonsen	(Czech Republic) Škoda 120S	8:47:09	
23.	70	(United Kingdom) George Hill (United Kingdom) Peter Bryant	(United Kingdom) Vauxhall Magnum	8:48:22	
24.	21	(Italy) Alcide Paganelli (Italy) Ninni Russo	(Italy) Fiat 124 Abarth Rallye	8:49:04	
25.	36	(United Kingdom) Jack Tordoff (United Kingdom) Phil Short	(Germany) Porsche 911 Carrera RS 2.7	8:50:17	
26.	43	(United Kingdom) Robin Eyre-Maunsell (United Kingdom) Neil Wilson	(United Kingdom) Hillman Avenger	9:02:17	
27.	91	(Germany) Harald Demuth (Germany) H. Eberl	(Japan) Toyota Celica 1600GT	9:03:16	
28.	37	(United Kingdom) Pat-Moss Carlsson (United Kingdom) Elizabeth Crellin	(Japan) Toyota Celica 1600GT	9:05:56	
29.	55	(United Kingdom) John Taylor (United Kingdom) Julian Chitty	(United Kingdom) Ford Escort RS1600	9:08:14	
30.	74	(United Kingdom) Pat Ryan (United Kingdom) Rob Smith	(United Kingdom) Morris Marina 1.3 Coupé	9:08:50	
31.	132	(United Kingdom) Rob Freeborough (United Kingdom) Terry Kaby	(United Kingdom) Morris Mini	9:10:29	
32.	45	(United Kingdom) Ronnie McCartney (United Kingdom) Terry Harryman	(Japan) Mazda RX-3	9:11:17	
33.	58	(United Kingdom) Colin Grewer (United Kingdom) Philip Welch	(Germany) Opel Ascona 1.9 SR	9:15:31	
34.	77	(United Kingdom) Bob Bean (United Kingdom) David Greenwood	(United Kingdom) Ford Escort Mexico	9:15:33	
35.	97	(United Kingdom) Gavin Waugh (United Kingdom) Peter Handy	(United Kingdom) Hillman Avenger	9:15:42	
36.	116	(United Kingdom) Charles Wood (United Kingdom) Tom Bigwood	(United Kingdom) Hillman Avenger	9:18:49	
37.	86	(United Kingdom) John Gemmell (United Kingdom) John Eyres	(United Kingdom) Hillman Avenger	9:23:00	
38.	185	(United Kingdom) Fred Henderson (United Kingdom) John Lee	(United Kingdom) Ford Escort RS1600	9:23:19	
39.	104	(United Kingdom) Dennis Pelling (United Kingdom) Ron Shipp	(United Kingdom) Ford Escort RS1600	9:24:30	
40.	108	(United Kingdom) Jill Robinson (United Kingdom) Dilys Rogers	(United Kingdom) Ford Escort RS1600	9:26:57	
41.	102	(United Kingdom) Murray Grierson (United Kingdom) Roger Anderson	(United Kingdom) Ford Escort Twin Cam	9:32:16	
42.	106	(United Kingdom) Chris Lord (United Kingdom) Chris Gray	(United Kingdom) Vauxhall Viva Magnum	9:34:24	
43.	34	(United Kingdom) Paul Windsor (United Kingdom) Ian Parry	(United Kingdom) Ford Escort RS1600	9:36:20	
44.	60	(Finland) Marketta Oksala (Finland) Ritva Rossi	(United Kingdom) Hillman Avenger	9:40:31	
45.	121	(Norway) Terje Sveinsvoll (Norway) Per Odvar Nyborg	(Japan) Honda Civic	9:41:16	
46.	107	(United Kingdom) Peter Thompson (United Kingdom) Simon Thompson	(United Kingdom) Vauxhall Firenza	9:44:36	
47.	93	(United Kingdom) David Thompson (United Kingdom) Maurice Isley	(United Kingdom) Vauxhall Firenza	9:46:40	
48.	137	(Netherlands) Thomas Meijlink (United Kingdom) John Morgan	(Germany) Opel Ascona 1.9 SR	9:46:59	
49.	140	(United Kingdom) Paul Burch (United Kingdom) Graham Marlow	(United Kingdom) Hillman Avenger	9:49:41	
50.	134	(Finland) Seppo Niittymäki (Finland) Risto Niittymäki	(Germany) BMW 2002 Tii	9:50:19	
51.	56	(Republic of Ireland) Rosemary Smith (United Kingdom) Pauline Gullick	(Germany) Opel Ascona 1.9 SR	9:50:25	
52.	144	(United Kingdom) Gordon Jarvis (United Kingdom) Jim Bowie	(United Kingdom) Hillman Avenger	9:50:35	
53.	111	(Spain) Enrique Inurrieta (United Kingdom) David Essex-Crosby	(United Kingdom) Ford Escort RS2000	9:55:36	
54.	172	(United Kingdom) Timothy Walton (United Kingdom) Ken Carter	(United Kingdom) Hillman Avenger	9:59:00	
55.	189	(United Kingdom) Peter Skinner (United Kingdom) T. Baldwin	(United Kingdom) Ford Escort Mexico	9:59:41	
56.	135	(United Kingdom) Norman Anstis (United Kingdom) John Haswell	(United Kingdom) Ford Escort RS1600	10:00:35	
57.	193	(United Kingdom) John Yeomans (United Kingdom) Eric Cowcill	(United Kingdom) Vauxhall Firenza	10:06:09	
58.	190	(United Kingdom) John Yeomans (United Kingdom) Sidney Rudge	(United Kingdom) Ford Escort 1300GT	10:07:57	
59.	163	(United Kingdom) John Rhodes (United Kingdom) Richard Pease	(United Kingdom) Ford Escort RS2000	10:11:02	
60.	129	(United Kingdom) Peter Hilliard (United Kingdom) Nicholas Price	(Italy) Alfa Romeo Alfasud TI	10:13:29	
61.	194	(United Kingdom) Brian Marshall (United Kingdom) Andrew Gardiner	(Japan) Mazda RX-3	10:17:27	
62.	175	(United Kingdom) Tony Brunskill (United Kingdom) David Orrick	(Japan) Mazda RX-3	10:19:34	
63.	152	(Norway) Arne Garvik (Norway) Geir Sveinsvoll	(Japan) Honda Civic	10:20:39	
64.	87	(East Germany) Horst Niebergall (East Germany) Winfried Heitzmann	(East Germany) Wartburg 353	10:21:24	
65.	124	(Norway) Trine Jensen (Norway) Merte Bråthen	(United Kingdom) Ford Escort Mexico	10:25:09	
66.	149	(Norway) Sigmund Holgersen (Norway) Asbjørn Kleven	(Japan) Honda Civic	10:30:11	
67.	145	(Germany) Manfred Droßel (Germany) Dieter Baresel	(Germany) Opel Ascona 1.6 SR	10:34:44	
68.	66	(East Germany) Egon Culmbacher (East Germany) Werner Ernst	(East Germany) Wartburg 353	10:38:45	
69.	125	(France) Roland Thérond (France) Xavier Gervoson	(France) Citroën DS21	10:41:10	
70.	96	(United Kingdom) Prince Michael of Kent (United Kingdom) Nigel Clarkson	(United Kingdom) Ford Escort RS2000	10:45:21	
71.	191	(United Kingdom) Geoffrey Eteson (United Kingdom) E. Golding	(United Kingdom) Hillman Imp	10:56:07	
72.	139	(Belgium) "Ronny" (Belgium) Michel Ampe	(United Kingdom) Ford Escort 1600GT	10:56:52	
73.	165	(United Kingdom) Timothy Tyrer (United Kingdom) P. Openshaw	(Japan) Mazda RX-3	11:05:01	
74.	119	(United Kingdom) Kathy Pegrum (United Kingdom) Elma Lewsey	(France) Peugeot 504	11:08:12	
75.	81	(East Germany) Roland Weitz (East Germany) Bernd Frommann	(East Germany) Wartburg 353	11:16:29	
76.	169	(United Kingdom) Robert Walker (United Kingdom) Andrew Marriott	(United Kingdom) Vauxhall Firenza	11:18:41	
77.	179	(United Kingdom) David Lucas (United Kingdom) Denis Abbott	(Germany) Volkswagen Käfer 1302S	11:19:41	
78.	170	(United Kingdom) Howard Lapsley (United Kingdom) Danny Browne	(East Germany) Wartburg 353	11:22:58	
79.	188	(United Kingdom) Robert Gardner (United Kingdom) John Adams	(United Kingdom) Austin 1800	11:29:13	
80.	178	(United Kingdom) Wilfred Crozier (United Kingdom) J. Thoburn	(France) Peugeot 104	11:40:42	
81.	133	(United Kingdom) Rupert Jones (United Kingdom) Mike Knutton	(Soviet Union) Lada 1200	11:44:05	
82.	192	(United Kingdom) David Brake (United Kingdom) Freda Brake	(United Kingdom) Hillman Imp	11:44:33	
83.	186	(United Kingdom) Keith Gibb (United Kingdom) K. Yallop	(United Kingdom) Morris Mini	12:24:25	
-	7	(Sweden) Per Eklund (Sweden) Björn Cederberg	(Sweden) Saab 96 V4	Retired (Differential)	
-	10	(Finland) Hannu Mikkola (United Kingdom) John Davenport	(United Kingdom) Ford Escort RS1600	Retired (Tire)	
-	12	(United Kingdom) Tony Fall (United Kingdom) Mike Broad	(Germany) Opel Ascona 1.9 SR	Retired (Axle)	
-	14	(Sweden) Ove Andersson (Sweden) Arne Hertz	(Japan) Toyota Corolla	Retired (Axle)	
-	15	(Finland) Markku Alén (United Kingdom) Paul White	(United Kingdom) Ford Escort RS1600	Retired (Water pump)	
-	18	(Sweden) Lars Carlsson (Netherlands) Bob de Jong	(Germany) Opel Ascona 1.9 SR	Retired (Gearbox)	
-	19	(Italy) Amilcare Ballestrieri (United Kingdom) Geraint Phillips	(Italy) Lancia Beta Coupé	Retired (Engine)	
-	22	(United Kingdom) Brian Culcheth (United Kingdom) Johnstone Syer	(United Kingdom) Triumph Dolomite Sprint	Retired (Accident)	
-	24	(Finland) Pentti Airikkala (Finland) Heikki Haaksiala	(United Kingdom) Ford Escort RS1600	Retired (Engine)	
-	25	(United Kingdom) Cathal Curley (United Kingdom) Austin Frazer	(Japan) Datsun 260Z	Retired (Accident)	
-	26	(United Kingdom) Adrian Boyd (United Kingdom) Frank Main	(United Kingdom) Ford Escort RS1600	Retired (Accident)	
-	27	(United Kingdom) Tony Pond (United Kingdom) Mike Wood	(Germany) Opel Ascona 1.9 SR	Retired (Tailgate joint)	
-	28	(United Kingdom) Colin Malkin (United Kingdom) Brian Coyle	(United Kingdom) Chrysler Avenger	Retired (Accident)	
-	29	(Sweden) Morgan Carlsson (Sweden) Claes Uddgren	(Sweden) Volvo 142S	Retired (Water pump)	
-	30	(United Kingdom) Andrew Cowan (United Kingdom) Hugh McNeill	(United Kingdom) Vauxhall Magnum	Retired (Engine)	
-	31	(United Kingdom) Tony Fowkes (United Kingdom) Bryan Harris	(United Kingdom) Ford Escort RS1600	Retired (Breakdown)	
-	35	(United Kingdom) Peter Clarke (United Kingdom) Howard Scott	(United Kingdom) Ford Escort RS1600	Retired (Desistant)	
-	38	(United Kingdom) Russell Brookes (United Kingdom) John Brown	(United Kingdom) Ford Escort RS1600	Retired (Gearbox)	
-	39	(Finland) Markku Saaristo (United Kingdom) Richard Hudson-Evans	(Czech Republic) Škoda 120S	Retired (Transmission)	
-	40	(Finland) Heikki Enomaa (Finland) Márti Honkavaara	(Germany) BMW 2002	Retired (Transmission)	
-	41	(United Kingdom) Tony Drummond (United Kingdom) David Richards	(United Kingdom) Ford Escort RS1600	Retired (Desistant)	
-	42	(United Kingdom) Donald Heggie (United Kingdom) George Dean	(United Kingdom) Ford Escort RS1600	Retired (Gearbox)	
-	47	(Sweden) Ingvar Carlsson (Sweden) Bo Reinicke	(Italy) Fiat 124 Abarth Rallye	Retired (Accident)	
-	48	(Sweden) Kenneth Johansson (United Kingdom) Peter Rushforth	(Sweden) Saab 96 V4	Retired (Desistant)	
-	49	(United Kingdom) Andy Dawson (United Kingdom) Colin Wilson	(United Kingdom) Morris Marina	Retired (Accident)	
-	50	(United Kingdom) David Thompson (United Kingdom) Mike Nicholson	(United Kingdom) Ford Escort RS1600	Retired (Engine)	
-	51	(United Kingdom) Bill Taylor (United Kingdom) Ian MacIver	(United Kingdom) Ford Escort RS1600	Retired (Electrical problem)	
-	52	(United Kingdom) Brian Evans (United Kingdom) David Marston	(Germany) Porsche 911 Carrera RS 2.7	Retired (Desistant)	
-	53	(United Kingdom) Kevin Videan (United Kingdom) Peter Valentine	(Japan) Datsun 260Z	Retired (Ignition)	
-	54	(Japan) Juichi Kojimoto (Japan) Hiroki Uchiyama	(Japan) Nissan	Retired(Desistant)	
-	59	(Czech Republic) Karel Šimek (Czech Republic) Oto Landecký	(Czech Republic) Škoda 120S	Retired (Transmission)	
-	61	(Finland) Johan Wiklund (Sweden) Lars-Erik Karlsson	(Germany) BMW 2002	Retired (Desistant)	
-	63	(Poland) Marek Gierowski (United Kingdom) David West	(Germany) Porsche 911 Carrera RS 2.7	Retired (Desistant)	
-	64	(United Kingdom) Chris Beynon (United Kingdom) Lyn Andrews	(Germany) Porsche	Retired (Oil Leak)	
-	65	(Finland) Juhani Länsikorpi (Finland) Leif Mälmstrom	(Sweden) Saab V4	Retired (Desistant)	
-	67	(Norway) Trond Schea (Norway) Per A. Bakke	(Soviet Union) Lada 1500 Rallye	Retired (Desistant)	
-	68	(United Kingdom) Barrie Williams (United Kingdom) Dave Hutchings	(Italy) Fiat 128	Retired (Desistant)	
-	69	(United Kingdom) Chris Wathen (United Kingdom) Tim Bosence	(United Kingdom) Ford Escort RS1600	Retired (Accident)	
-	72	(United Kingdom) A. Pierson (United Kingdom) J. Watkin	(United Kingdom) Ford Escort RS1600	Retired (Desistant)	
-	73	(United Kingdom) Pip Dale (United Kingdom) David Whiteley	(United Kingdom) Vauxhall Firenza	Retired (Differential)	
-	75	(Germany) Heinz-Walter Scheme (Germany) Peter Linzen	(Germany) Porsche Carrera	Retired (Connection accident)	
-	78	(United Kingdom) David Palmby (United Kingdom) Peter Clark	(United Kingdom) Ford Escort RS1600	Retired (Desistant)	
-	79	(United Kingdom) Colin Vandervell (United Kingdom) John Gittins	(United Kingdom) Ford Escort RS1600	Retired (Desistant)	
-	82	(United Kingdom) Paul Appleby (United Kingdom) Keith O'Dell	(United Kingdom) Ford Escort RS1600	Retired (Desistant)	
-	83	(United Kingdom) Bob Jeffs (United Kingdom) Robin Tyler-Morris	(United Kingdom) Chrysler Avenger	Retired (Desistant)	
-	84	(United Kingdom) Gordon Batchelr (United Kingdom) Rodger Jenkins	(United Kingdom) Ford Escort	Retired (Desistant)	
-	88	(United Kingdom) Roger Platt (United Kingdom) John Platt	(United Kingdom) Ford Capri 3000	Retired (Desistant)	
-	90	(United Kingdom) David Hardcastle (United Kingdom) Tony McMahon	(Germany) Opel Ascona 1.9 SR	Retired (Time limit exceded)	
-	92	(United Kingdom) George Botty (United Kingdom) Ian Young	(United Kingdom) Ford Escort Twin Cam	Retired (Desistant)	
-	94	(United Kingdom) Ian Wilson (United Kingdom) Peter Anderson	(Germany) Opel Ascona 1.6 SR	Retired (Electrical problem)	
-	95	(France) André Gahinet (France) Bernard Toux	(France) Renault 12 Gordini	Retired (Desistant)	
-	98	(United Kingdom) David Porter (United Kingdom) John Baillie	(United Kingdom) Vauxhall Magnum Coupé	Retired (Desistant)	
-	99	(United Kingdom) Peter McDowell (United Kingdom) Peter Moss	(Germany) BMW 2002 Tii	Retired (Desistant)	
-	101	(United Kingdom) George Beever (United Kingdom) Stuart France	(United Kingdom) Ford Escort RS1600	Retired (Excluded)	
-	103	(United Kingdom) Malcolm Wise (United Kingdom) Rod Palmer	(United Kingdom) Ford Escort RS1600	Retired (Desistant)	
-	110	(United Kingdom) John Jago (United Kingdom) Duncan Spence	(United Kingdom) Ford Escort Twin Cam	Retired (Time Limit Exceeded)	
-	112	(United Kingdom) John Cockerill (United Kingdom) James Goodman	(United Kingdom) Ford Escort RS1600	Retired (Desistant)	
-	113	(United Kingdom) Bill Mather (United Kingdom) Neil Carter	(United Kingdom) Ford Escort 1300	Retired (Desistant)	
-	114	(Sweden) Olle Dahl (Sweden) Jan-Olof Bohlin	(Sweden) Saab 96 V4	Retired (Desistant)	
-	115	(France) Philippe Gobert (France) Guy Pasquier	(Italy) Fiat 124 Spider	Retired (Desistant)	
-	117	(United Kingdom) Philip Cooper (United Kingdom) Eddy Bamford	(United Kingdom) Morris Marina	Retired (Gearbox)	
-	120	(United Kingdom) John Clegg (United Kingdom) Michael Sutcliffe	(Sweden) Volvo 140S	Retired (Desistant)	
-	122	(United Kingdom) Sandy Lawson (United Kingdom) Gwenda Eadie	(Netherlands) DAF 55	Retired (Suspension)	
-	123	(Norway) Wenche Knudtzen (Norway) Eidis Huseby Kvaalen	(Soviet Union) Lada 1500	Retired (Desistant)	
-	126	(Norway) Per-Gunnar Nygaard (Norway) Steinar Jortun	(France) Renault 12 Gordini	Retired (Desistant)	
-	127	(United Kingdom) P. Rook (United Kingdom) John Rook	(United Kingdom) Ford Escort RS1600	Retired (Desistant)	
-	128	(United Kingdom) Stanley Griffin (United Kingdom) John Chatfield	(United Kingdom) Ford Escort RS1600	Retired (Desistant)	
-	131	(Germany) Falko Jansen (Germany) Helmut Maier	(France) Simca 1100 TI	Retired (Desistant)	
-	136	(United Kingdom) Leo Bertorelli (United Kingdom) Robert G. Woods	(Italy) Alfa Romeo Alfasud TI	Retired (Engine)	
-	138	(United Kingdom) David Cowan (United Kingdom) Les Cowan	(United Kingdom) Morris Mini	Retired (Desistant)	
-	141	(France) M. Andre (France) J. Dehoux	(France) Simca Rallye 2	Retired (Desistant)	
-	142	(Germany) Manfred Gudladt (Germany) Eckhard Erbach	(Germany) Opel Ascona 1.6 SR	Retired (Desistant)	
-	143	(United States) Benson Ford (United States) Elliot Kaplan	(United Kingdom) Ford Escort RS2000	Retired (Excluded)	
-	146	(United Kingdom) Mike Dale (United Kingdom) Edward Ganderton	(Soviet Union) Moskvitch 412	Retired (Desistant)	
-	148	(United Kingdom) Henry Hardiment (United Kingdom) John Banks	(United Kingdom) Morris Mini	Retired (Desistant)	
-	150	(United Kingdom) David Gillanders (United Kingdom) J. Baird	(Sweden) Volvo 142S	Retired (Desistant)	
-	151	(United Kingdom) Don Mathieson (United Kingdom) Peter Titterton	(Czech Republic) Škoda 110	Retired (Desistant)	
-	153	(United Kingdom) Ian Lawless (United Kingdom) Tony Goulding	(United Kingdom) Ford Escort RS2000	Retired (Desistant)	
-	154	(United Kingdom) Richard Rowland (United Kingdom) Howard Cooper	(Czech Republic) Škoda 120	Retired (Desistant)	
-	155	(United Kingdom) Keith Guppy (United Kingdom) Alan Goodrick	(United Kingdom) Ford Escort 1300	Retired (Desistant)	
-	156	(United Kingdom) David Childs (United Kingdom) Alan Patis	(United Kingdom) Ford Escort Twin Cam	Retired (Desistant)	
-	157	(United Kingdom) Glyn Hubbard (United Kingdom) Robert Atkind	(United Kingdom) Ford Escort 1300	Retired (Desistant)	
-	158	(United Kingdom) Mike Jackson (United Kingdom) Ian Maxey	(United Kingdom) Ford Escort Twin Cam	Retired (Desistant)	
-	159	(United Kingdom) Stewart Morgan (United Kingdom) N. Siggs	(Japan) Toyota Corolla	Retired (Desistant)	
-	160	(United Kingdom) Dan Margulies (United Kingdom) A. Kirk	(Germany) Porsche	Retired (Desistant)	
-	161	(United Kingdom) J. Collins (United Kingdom) M. Roper	(United Kingdom) Ford Escort RS2000	Retired (Desistant)	
-	162	(United Kingdom) Bryan Wood (United Kingdom) Jon Sharpe	(United Kingdom) Ford Escort RS1600	Retired (Desistant)	
-	164	(United Kingdom) Derek Skinner (United Kingdom) Tony Booth	(United Kingdom) MG B	Retired (Desistant)	
-	166	(United Kingdom) Jan Dooley (United Kingdom) Tony Pettie	(Italy) Alfa Romeo Alfasud TI	Retired (Clutch)	
-	167	(United Kingdom) Dick Newsum (United Kingdom) Tim Beall	(Netherlands) DAF 55	Retired (Desistant)	
-	168	(United Kingdom) R. Wadman (United Kingdom) M. Illier	(France) Peugeot 304	Retired (Desistant)	
-	171	(United Kingdom) Bill Douglas (United Kingdom) Michael Smith	(United Kingdom) Triumph 2.5pi	Retired (Desistant)	
-	174	(United Kingdom) Gethin Jones (United Kingdom) Frank Rutter	(Soviet Union) Moskvitch 412	Retired (Desistant)	
-	176	(United Kingdom) Tim Morris (United Kingdom) Raymond Crowther	(United Kingdom) Ford Escort RS1600	Retired (Desistant)	
-	177	(United Kingdom) Les Birkett (United Kingdom) Tony Blore	(United Kingdom) Morris Mini	Retired (Desistant)	
-	180	(United Kingdom) B. Peachey (United Kingdom) Bob Miles	(Soviet Union) Moskvitch 412	Retired (Desistant)	
-	181	(United Kingdom) Roger Stubbs (United Kingdom) A. Golden	(Japan) Datsun 240Z	Retired (Desistant)	
-	182	(United Kingdom) Richard Higgs (United Kingdom) David Sloan	(Soviet Union) Lada	Retired (Desistant)	
-	183	(United Kingdom) P. Grant (United Kingdom) A. Jones	(United Kingdom) Morris Mini	Retired (Desistant)	
-	184	(United Kingdom) Brian Bayley (United Kingdom) Glyn Saunders	(United Kingdom) Hillman Avenger	Retired (Desistant)	
-	187	(United Kingdom) H. Bruce (United Kingdom) P. Taylor	(United Kingdom) Ford Escort	Retired (Desistant)	
-	196	(United Kingdom) Graham Woodhouse (United Kingdom) M. Parker	(Japan) Mazda RX-3	Retired (Desistant)	
-	197	(United Kingdom) P. Kendrick (United Kingdom) Maurice Baker	(United Kingdom) Ford Escort Mexico	Retired (Desistant)	
-	198	(United Kingdom) Thomas Leake (United Kingdom) Kenneth Evans	(France) Simca Rallye	Retired (Desistant)	
-	199	(United Kingdom) David Franks (United Kingdom) Barrie Savory	(United Kingdom) Ford Escort RS1600	Retired (Desistant)	
-	200	(United Kingdom) Bob Parkinson (United Kingdom) Peter Messer	(United Kingdom) Hillman Avenger	Retired (Desistant)	

== Championship Standings after event ==
Rank	Manufacturer	Event								Total points
Rank	Manufacturer	POR (Portugal)	KEN (Kenya)	FIN (Finland)	ITA (Italy)	CAN (Canada)	USA (United States)	GBR (United Kingdom)	FRA (France)	Total points
1	(Italy) Lancia	-	12	-	20	20	10	12	-	74
2	(Italy) Fiat	20	1	12	15	-	15	-	-	63
3	(United States) Ford	2	2	20	-	10	-	20	-	54
4	(Japan) Toyota	10	-	-	-	12	-	10	-	32
5	(Japan) Datsun	8	10	-	-	8	-	2	-	28
6	(Germany) Porsche	-	15	-	8	-	4	-	-	27
7	(Sweden) Saab	-	-	10	-	-	-	15	-	25
8	(Germany) Opel	-	-	3	12	-	-	8	-	23
9	(Japan) Mitsubishi	-	20	-	-	-	-	-	-	20
9	(France) Renault	-	-	-	-	-	20	-	-	20
11	(France) Alpine-Renault	6	-	-	-	-	8	-	-	14
12	(Germany) BMW	4	-	-	-	-	-	-	-	4
12	(France) Peugeot	-	4	-	-	-	-	-	-	4
14	(France) Citroën	3	-	-	-	-	-	-	-	3
15	(Sweden) Volvo	-	-	-	-	-	1	6	-	7
