= 1974 Rally of the Rideau Lakes =

Rally racing

1974 Rally of the Rideau Lakes 2nd Rally of the Rideau Lakes
Round 5 of the 1974 World Rally Championship season
← Previous event	Next event →
- Host country: Canada
- Rally base: Smiths Falls
- Dates run: 16 October – 20 October 1974
- Stages: 40
- Stage surface: Gravel
- Overall distance: 1,577.60 km (980.28 miles) (approx.)

Statistics
- Crews: 51 at start, 19 at finish

Overall results
- Overall winner: (Italy) Sandro Munari (Italy) Mario Mannucci (Italy) Lancia

The 1974 Rally of the Rideau Lakes (formally the 2nd Rally of the Rideau Lakes) was the fifth round of the 1974 World Rally Championship season. It ran between October 16 and October 20.

== Report ==
The Rally of the Rideau Lakes took place in and around Smiths Falls, Ontario. The rally had 40 stages and was won by Sandro Munari and Mario Mannucci on a Lancia Stratos HF.

The distribution of points is 20, 15, 12, 10, 8, 6, 4, 3, 2, and 1. Lancia received the maximum 20 points, Toyota winning 12 thanks to Walter Boyce, Ford winning 10, and Datsun winning 8. Lancia also had a points advantage due to their second place, keeping other manufacturers from receiving those 15 points.

== Results ==
Pos.	#	Driver and Co-driver	Car	Time	Points
1974 Rideau Lake results
1.	103	(Italy) Sandro Munari (Italy) Mario Mannucci	(Italy) Lancia Stratos HF	4:54:31	20
2.	107	(Finland) Simo Lampinen (United Kingdom) John Davenport	(Italy) Lancia Beta Coupé	4:56:50	
3.	101	(Canada) Walter Boyce (United Kingdom) Stuart Gray	(Japan) Toyota Celica 1600	5:07:46	12
4.	116	(United Kingdom) Keith Billows (United States) John Campbell	(United Kingdom) Ford Escort RS1600 MKI	5:16:50	10
5.	141	(United States) Eric Jones (United States) Mark Hathaway	(Japan) Datsun 510	5:21:10	8
6.	117	(Canada) Bo Skowronnek (Canada) Tony Woodlands	(Japan) Datsun 240Z	5:23:23	
7.	118	(Canada) Jacques Racine (Canada) Michel Poirier-Defoy	(Japan) Datsun 510 SSS	5:28:01	
8.	108	(United States) John Smiskol (United States) Carol Smiskol	(Japan) Datsun 260Z	5:32:31	
9.	122	(Canada) Glen Thomas (Canada) Ron Arthur	(Japan) Datsun 510	5:39:44	
10.	121	(Canada) Howard Whan (Canada) Jim Pue-Bilchrist	(Japan) Datsun 510	5:53:13	
11.	135	(New Zealand) Ross MacKay (Canada) Les Taylor	(Japan) Toyota Corolla SR5	5:56:39	
12.	164	(Canada) Vladimir Belohlavek (Canada) Guy Phillips	(Japan) Toyota Corolla SR5	5:57:10	
13.	159	(United States) Fred Olds (United States) Steve Fernald	(Japan) Datsun 510	5:57:24	
14.	158	(United States) John Kelley (United States) Claudia Hunt-Kelley	(Japan) Datsun 240Z	5:59:45	
15.	148	(Canada) Lawrence Partington (Canada) Simon Adler	(Germany) Volkswagen Beetle	6:07:40	
16.	136	(Canada) Colin Werner (Canada) Edward Agnew	(Japan) Honda Civic	6:16:19	
17.	140	(Canada) Jock Wilson (Canada) Fred Baker	(Germany) Mercedes-Benz 300 SEL	6:16:55	
18.	152	(United States) Thomas Urban (United States) Robert Kane	(Sweden) Saab 96 V4	6:27:13	
19.	134	(United States) Bent Pahl (United States) Bob Newland	(United States) Plymouth Cricket	6:34:09	
-	102	(Finland) Markku Alén (Finland) Ilkka Kivimäki	(Italy) Fiat Abarth 124 Rallye	Retired(Accident)	
-	104	(Italy) Alcide Paganelli (Italy) Ninni Russo	(Italy) Fiat Abarth 124 Rallye	Retired(Suspension)	
-	105	(Poland) Sobiesław Zasada (Poland) Jerzy Dobrzański	(Germany) Porsche Carrera 911 RS	Retired(Co-driver ill)	
-	106	(United States) James Walker (United States) Terry Palmer	(Sweden) Volvo 124 S	Retired(Differential)	
-	109	(United Kingdom) Brian Culcheth (United Kingdom) Johnstone Syer	(United Kingdom) Morris Marina 1.8 TC Coupé	Retired(Differential)	
-	110	(Canada) Jean-Paul Pérusse (Canada) John Bellefleur	(Italy) Fiat Abarth 124 Rallye	Retired(Gearbox)	
-	112	(Italy) Mauro Pregliasco (Italy) Angelo Garzoglio	(Italy) Lancia Beta Coupé	Retired(Engine)	
-	114	(Canada) Randy Black (Canada) Tom Burgess	(Japan) Datsun 510 SSS	Retired(Head Gasket)	
-	119	(Canada) Gary Neil (Canada) Don Ramsay	(Japan) Datsun 510 SSS	Retired(Retired)	
-	120	(United States) George Wirtjes (United States) Perry Beadon	(Japan) Mazda Familia	Retired(Retired)	
-	123	(Canada) Victor Wejer (Canada) Tom Birchall	(Japan) Toyota Corolla SR5	Retired(Retired)	
-	124	(Canada) Charles McLaren (Canada) Ron Lyons	(Japan) Datsun 510	Retired(Retired)	
-	125	(Canada) Ole Pedersen (Canada) Dave Golem	(Japan) Datsun 510	Retired(Accident)	
-	129	(Canada) Gordon Lansdell (Canada) Jim Thomson	(Japan) Honda Civic	Retired(Retired)	
-	130	(United States) William Natho (United States) Charles Garrett Watters	(Japan) Datsun 510	Retired(Retired)	
-	132	(Canada) Doug Leverton (Canada) Ken Humphrey	(Japan) Datsun 510	Retired(Retired)	
-	133	(Canada) Michel Ladouceur (Canada) Yves LaPierre	(Japan) Toyota Corolla SR5	Retired(Retired)	
-	137	(Canada) Pot Stiles (Canada) John Nixon	(Japan) Datsun 240Z	Retired(Retired)	
-	142	(United States) Randy Graves (United States) Ruth Heidel	(France) Alpine-Renault A110 1300G	Retired(Retired)	
-	143	(United States) John Crawford (United States) Walter Krafft	(Sweden) Saab 96 V4	Retired(Retired)	
-	144	(Canada) Albert Bolton (Canada) Gabriel Brodie	(Japan) Datsun 510	Retired(Retired)	
-	145	(United States) Walter Kammer (United States) Roger Dooley	(Japan) Datsun 510	Retired(Retired)	
-	146	(United States) Gary Eaton (United States) Carolyn Eaton	(Germany) Volkswagen 1302 S	Retired(Retired)	
-	147	(Canada) George Deglaris (Canada) Roy Mason	(Japan) Datsun 510	Retired(Retired)	
-	149	(United States) William Pichardo (United States) John Baer	(Italy) Fiat Abarth 124 Spider	Retired(Retired)	
-	150	(Canada) Jim Robertson (Canada) Steve Farrell	(Japan) Datsun 510	Retired(Retired)	
-	153	(Canada) Keith Spencer (Canada) Rob Simpson	(Japan) Honda Civic	Retired(Retired)	
-	155	(Canada) Jack Burnett (Canada) Charles Larke	(Germany) BMW 2002 Tii	Retired(Retired)	
-	157	(United States) Kent Gardam (United States) Sandra Gardam	(Japan) Datsun 510 SSS	Retired(Retired)	
-	161	(United States) Loyal Jodar (United States) Jon Wickens	(United States) Shelby Mustang GT 350	Retired(Retired)	
-	162	(United States) Thomas O'Connor (United States) Ross Bonesteel	(Germany) BMW 1602	Retired(Retired)	
-	165	(France) Guy Chasseuil (France) Jean-Pierre Rouget	(France) Alpine-Renault A110 1800	Retired(Accident)	

Source:eWRC Results

== Championship Standings after event ==
Rank	Manufacturer	Event								Total points
Rank	Manufacturer	POR (Portugal)	KEN (Kenya)	FIN (Finland)	ITA (Italy)	CAN (Canada)	USA (United States)	GBR (United Kingdom)	FRA (France)	Total points
1	(Italy) Lancia	-	12	-	20	20	-	-	-	52
2	(Italy) Fiat	20	1	12	15	-	-	-	-	48
3	(United States) Ford	2	2	20	-	10	-	-	-	34
4	(Japan) Datsun	8	10	-	-	8	-	-	-	26
5	(Germany) Porsche	-	15	-	8	-	-	-	-	23
6	(Japan) Toyota	10	-	-	-	12	-	-	-	22
7	(Japan) Mitsubishi	-	20	-	-	-	-	-	-	20
8	(Germany) Opel	-	-	3	12	-	-	-	-	15
9	(Sweden) Saab	-	-	10	-	-	-	-	-	10
10	(France) Alpine-Renault	6	-	-	-	-	-	-	-	6
11	(Germany) BMW	4	-	-	-	-	-	-	-	4
11	(France) Peugeot	-	4	-	-	-	-	-	-	4
13	(France) Citroën	3	-	-	-	-	-	-	-	3
