= 1974 Rallye Sanremo =

1974 Rallye Sanremo 16th Rallye Sanremo
Round 4 of the 1974 World Rally Championship season
← Previous event	Next event →
- Host country: Italy
- Rally base: Sanremo, Italy
- Dates run: 2 October – 5 October 1974
- Stage surface: Tarmac/Gravel
- Overall distance: 1,805 km (1,122 miles) (approx.)

Statistics
- Crews: 113 at start, 33 at finish

Overall results
- Overall winner: (Italy) Sandro Munari (Italy) Mario Mannucci (Italy) Lancia

The 1974 Rallye Sanremo (formally the 16th Rallye Sanremo) was the fourth round of the 1974 World Rally Championship season. It started on October 2 and ended on October 5.

== Rally Racing Teams ==
Racing Team	Driver	Co-driver	#	Car
1974 Rallye Sanremo racing teams
(Italy) Lancia Marlboro	(Italy) Sandro Munari	(Italy) Mario Mannucci	2	(Italy) Lancia Stratos HF
(Italy) Lancia Marlboro	(Italy) Amilcare Ballestrieri	(Italy) Silvio Maiga	4	(Italy) Lancia Stratos HF
(Italy) Lancia Marlboro	(Finland) Simo Lampinen	(United Kingdom) John Davenport	6	(Italy) Lancia Beta Coupé
(Italy) Lancia Marlboro	(Kenya) Shekhar Mehta	(United Kingdom) Martin Holmes	14	(Italy) Lancia Beta Coupé
(Italy) Fiat Rally Team	(Italy) Maurizio Verini	(Italy) Gino Macaluso	1	(Italy) Fiat Abarth 124 Rallye
(Italy) Fiat Rally Team	(Finland) Markku Alén	(Finland) Ilkka Kivimäki	3	(Italy) Fiat Abarth 124 Rallye
(Italy) Fiat Rally Team	(Italy) Raffaele Pinto	(Italy) Arnaldo Bernacchini	5	(Italy) Fiat Abarth 124 Rallye
(Italy) Fiat Rally Team	(Italy) Fulvio Bacchelli	(Italy) Bruno Scabini	7	(Italy) Fiat Abarth 124 Rallye
(Italy) Fiat Rally Team	(Italy) Alcide Paganelli	(Italy) Ninni Russo	8	(Italy) Fiat Abarth 124 Rallye
(Italy) Fiat Rally Team	(Italy) Sergio Barbasio	(Italy) Piero Sodano	10	(Italy) Fiat Abarth 124 Rallye
(Italy) Fiat Rally Team	(Italy) Giulio Bisulli	(Italy) Francesco Rossetti	12	(Italy) Fiat Abarth 124 Rallye
(Italy) Tre Gazzelle	(Italy) Alfredo Fagnola	(Italy) Elvio Novarese	32	(Germany) Opel Ascona 1.9 SR
(Italy) Tre Gazzelle	(Italy) Biagio Muscionico	(Italy) Maura Muscionico	72	(Italy) Lancia Fulvia HF
(Italy) Tre Gazzelle	(Italy) Mario Quarciari	(Italy) Di Muzio	107	(Italy) Fiat 128 C
(Italy) Jolly Club	(Italy) Luciano Trombotto	(Italy) Giuseppe Zanchetti	9	(Italy) Alfa Romeo Alfetta
(Italy) Jolly Club	(Italy) Gabriele Sciascia	(Italy) Francesco Bullani	28	(Italy) Lancia Stratos HF
(Italy) Jolly Club	(Italy) Guido Del Prete	(Italy) Paolo Roasenda	70	(Italy) Lancia Fulvia 1.6 Coupé HF
(Italy) Scuderia Dei Fiori	(Italy) Massimo Mido Morielli	(Italy) Carlo Zamunaro	41	(Italy) Lancia Fulvia 1.6 Coupé HF
(Italy) Scuderia Dei Fiori	(Italy) Giovanni Zorzato	(Italy) M. Barello	103	(Italy) Autobianchi A112 Abarth
(Italy) Scuderia Dei Fiori	(Italy) Piero Tosi	(Italy) Mauro Costamagna	110	(Italy) Fiat 128 Rally
(Italy) Scuderia Dei Fiori	(Italy) Pierluigi Maselli	(Italy) Arturo	116	(Italy) Fiat 128
(Italy) Siarca Ass.	(Italy) Renzo Magnani	(Italy) Roberto Dalpozzo	71	(Italy) Lancia Fulvia 1.6 Coupé HF
(Italy) Hair Inter	(France) Alain Errani	(France) Vincent Laverne	51	(Germany) Opel Ascona 1.9 SR
(Italy) Genzianella Veltro	(Italy) Giorgio Bramino	(Italy) Giorgio D'Angelo	50	(Germany) Opel Ascona
(Italy) R.C. Vaemenia	(Italy) Giovanni Pedretti	(Italy) Mario Cagnoli	52	(Germany) Opel Ascona 1.9 SR
(Italy) Vaemenia Jolly Club	(Italy) Roberto Steffen	(Italy) Luigi Caielli	57	(Germany) Opel Ascona
(Italy) Vaemenia Jolly Club	(Italy) Silvano Faggio	(Italy) Mauro Rolando	88	(Italy) Fiat 128
(Italy) Grifone Genova	(Italy) Carlo Brion	(Italy) Luigi Stuani	75	(Italy) Lancia Fulvia 1.6 Coupé HF
(Italy) Torino RC	(Italy) Aldo Isabella	(Italy) Giorgio Vergnano	96	(Italy) Alfa Romeo 2000 GTV
(Italy) Scuderia Grifone	(Italy) Bruno Ferraris	(Italy) Daniele Cianci	29	(Italy) Lancia Beta Coupé
(Italy) Piave Jolly Club	(Italy) Angelo Presotto	(Italy) Luana Vanzi	31	(Germany) Opel Ascona 1.9 SR
(Italy) Friuli	(Italy) Adartico Vurafieri	(Italy) Fei	34	(Germany) Porsche Carrera
(Italy) Valle d'Aosta Rally Team	(Italy) Gianfranco Cantore	(Italy) Giovanni Cantore	56	(Germany) Opel Ascona
(Italy) Rododendri	(Italy) Cesare Tetti	(Italy) Robazza	101	(Italy) Fiat 124 S
(Spain) SEAT	(Spain) Juan Carlos Pradera	(Spain) Ricardo Comyn	95	(Spain) SEAT 1430/1800

== Report ==
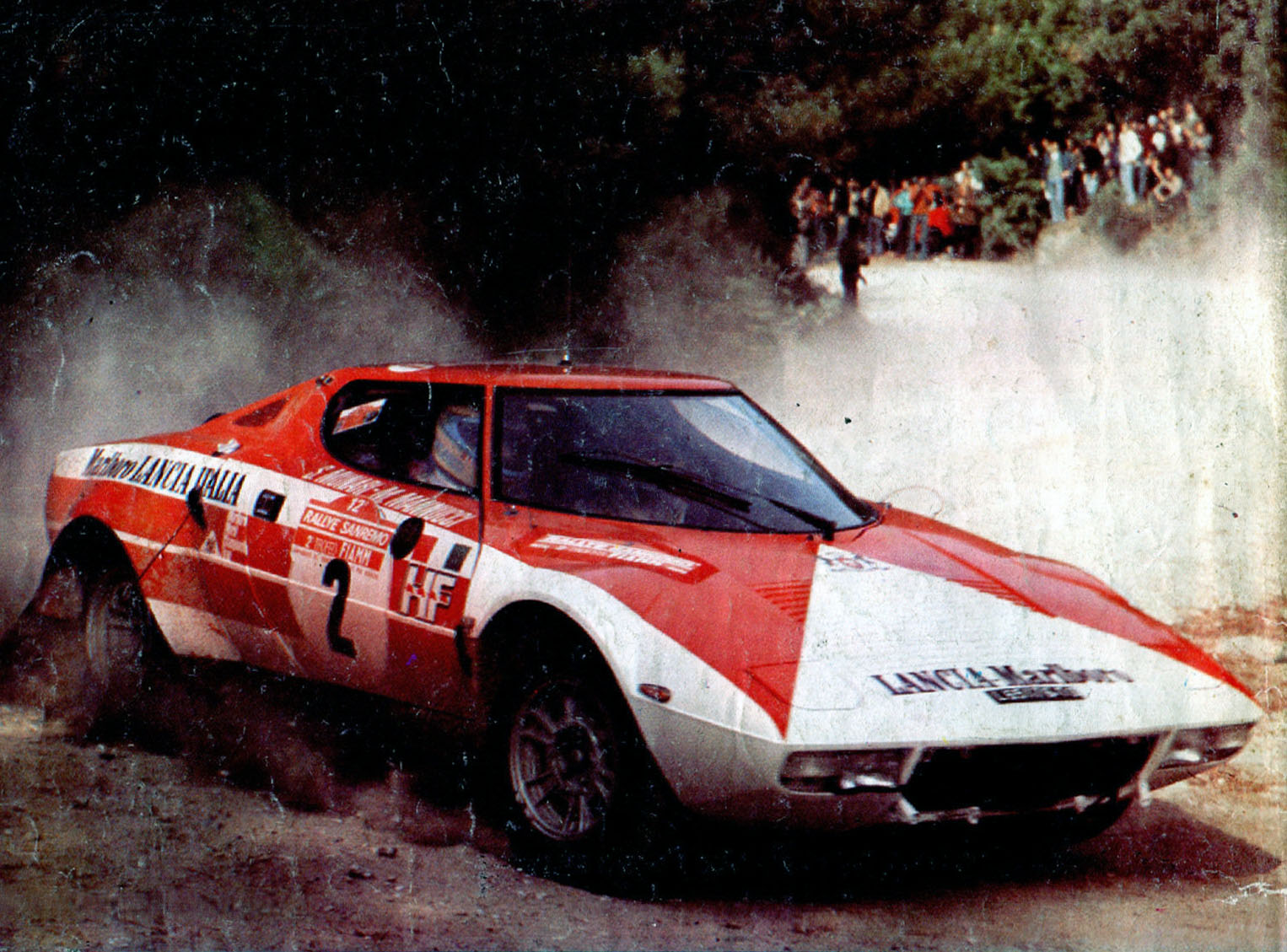
Sandro Munari driving a Lancia Stratos HF

The race took place in the city of Sanremo, in Liguria, Italy, and the Italian pilot Sandro Munari won. The race took place in 39 races, covering the Italian Northwest, in Liguria. It started on the 2nd of October and ended on the 5th of October; the rally points were distributed as 20, 15, 12, 10, 8, 6, 4, 3, 2 and 1; the distribution of points between brands was with Lancia gaining 20, Fiat gaining 15, Opel gaining 12 and Porsche gaining 8.

== Results ==
Pos.	#	Group	Driver	Co-driver	Car	Time	Difference	Points
1974 Rallye Sanremo results
1.	2	4/2	(Italy) Sandro Munari	(Italy) Mario Mannucci	(Italy) Lancia Stratos HF	9:12:43	0:0	20
2.	12	4/2	(Italy) Giulio Bisulli	(Italy) Francesco Rosetti	(Italy) Fiat Abarth 124 Rallye	9:20:30	7:47	15
3.	32	1/5	(Italy) Alfredo Fagnola	(Italy) Elvio Novarese	(Germany) Opel Ascona	9:56:09	43:26	12
4.	14	3/3	(Kenya) Shekhar Mehta	(United Kingdom) Martin Holmes	(Italy) Lancia Beta Coupé	9:58:38	45:55	
5.	37	4/1	(Italy) Gualberto Carducci	(Italy) Dino Defendenti	(Germany) Porsche 911 Carrera	10:05:59	53:16	8
6.	41	4/1	(Italy) Massimo Mido Morielli	(Italy) Carlo Zamunaro	(Italy) Lancia Fulvia 1.6 Coupé HF	10:13:12	1:00:29	
7.	71	3/2	(Italy) Renzo Magnani	(Italy) Roberto Dalpozzo	(Italy) Lancia Fulvia 1.6 Coupé HF	10:15:10	1:02:27	
8.	51	2/5	(France) Alain Errani	(France) Vincent Laverne	(Germany) Opel Ascona 1.9 SR	10:17:14	1:04:31	
9.	90	1/5	(Italy) Paolo Isnardi	(Italy) Simone Scimone	(Germany) Opel Ascona	10:24:24	1:11:41	
10.	50	2/5	(Italy) Giorgio Bramino	(Italy) Giorgio D'Angelo	(Germany) Opel Ascona	10:27:15	1:14:32	
11.	52	2/5	(Italy) Giovanni Pedretti	(Italy) Mario Cagnoli	(Germany) Opel Ascona 1.9 SR	10:32:23	1:19:40	
12.	57	2/5	(Italy) Roberto Steffen	(Italy) Luigi Caielli	(Germany) Opel Ascona	10:41:38	1:28:55	
13.	70	3/2	(Italy) Guido del Prete	(Italy) Paolo Roasenda	(Italy) Lancia Fulvia 1.6 Coupé HF	10:50:19	1:37:36	
14.	75	3/2	(Italy) Carlo Brion	(Italy) Luigi Stuani	(Italy) Lancia Fulvia 1.6 Coupé HF	10:57:02	1:44:19	
15.	63	2/4	(France) Thierry Derreumaux	(France) Derrys Derreumaux	(France) Renault 12 Gordini	11:05:36	1:52:53	
16.	87	2/2	(Italy) M. Bozzo	(Italy) Marinelli	(Italy) Fiat 128 C	11:06:19	1:53:36	
17.	88	2/2	(Italy) Silvano Faggio	(Italy) Mauro Rolando	(Italy) Fiat 128	11:07:03	1:54:20	
18.	58	2/5	(Italy) Renzo Ronny Sganzetta	(Italy) Mauro Randetti	(Italy) Alfa Romeo Alfetta	11:07:03	1:54:20	
19.	73	3/2	(France) Michel Andre-Poyaud	(France) Christian Vinoy	(France) Alpine-Renault A110	11:11:52	1:59:09	
20.	110	1/3	(Italy) Piero Tosi	(Italy) Mauro Costamagna	(Italy) Fiat 128 Rally	11:14:44	2:02:21	
21.	103	2/2	(Italy) Giovanni Zorzato	(Italy) M. Barello	(Italy) Autobianchi A112 Abarth	11:14:54	2:02:11	
22.	105	2/2	(Italy) Ugo Ameglio	(Italy) Piero Ramella	(Italy) Autobianchi A112 Abarth	11:23:07	2:10:24	
23.	69	3/3	(Italy) Giorgio Gastaldi	(Italy) Bellan	(Italy) Fiat 124 Spider	11:25:54	2:13:11	
24.	113	1/3	(Italy) Francesco Chiappori	(Italy) Bianchi	(Italy) Fiat 128 C	11:33:53	2:21:10	
25.	104	2/2	(Italy) Fernando Aschieri	(Italy) Ennio Moro	(Italy) Autobianchi A112 Abarth	11:43:23	2:30:40	
26.	77	3/2	(Italy) Dominico Rigazzi	(Italy) Foriani	(Italy) Lancia Fulvia HF	11:49:22	2:36:39	
27.	116	1/3	(Italy) Pierlugi Maselli	(Italy) Arturo	(Italy) Fiat 128	11:56:04	2:43:21	
28.	117	1/1	(Italy) Chiolero Geninatti	(Italy) Piacenza	(Italy) Autobianchi A112 Abarth	12:06:57	2:54:14	
29.	80	2/2	(Italy) Giampiero Ferrari Cuniolo	(Italy) Raina	(Italy) Fiat 128	12:08:05	2:55:22	
30.	121	1/1	(Italy) Carlo Curto	(Italy) Palmeri	(Italy) Fiat 850	12:25:26	3:12:43	
31.	72	3/2	(Italy) Biagio Muscionico	(Italy) Maura Muscionico	(Italy) Lancia Fulvia HF	12:25:34	3:12:51	
32.	96	1/5	(Italy) Aldo Isabella	(Italy) Giorgio Vergnano	(Italy) Alfa Romeo 2000 GT	12:33:33	2:20:50	
33.	118	1/1	(Italy) Ghiselli	(Italy) Bertoni	(Italy) Autobianchi A112 Abarth	12:33:35	2:20:52	
-	1	4/2	(Italy) Maurizio Verini	(Italy) Gino Macaluso	(Italy) Fiat 124 Abarth Rallye	Retired (Accident)		
-	3	4/2	(Finland) Markku Alén	(Finland) Ilkka Kivimäki	(Italy) Fiat 124 Abarth Rallye	Retired (Retired)		
-	4	4/2	(Italy) Amilcare Ballestrieri	(Italy) Silvio Maiga	(Italy) Lancia Stratos HF	Retired (Accident)		
-	5	4/2	(Italy) Raffaele Pinto	(Italy) Arnaldo Bernacchini	(Italy) Fiat 124 Abarth Rallye	Retired (Accident)		
-	6	4/2	(Finland) Simo Lampinen	(United Kingdom) John Davenport	(Italy) Lancia Beta Coupé	Retired (Excluded - Technical Infraction)		
-	7	4/2	(Italy) Fulvio Baccheli	(Italy) Bruno Scabini	(Italy) Fiat 124 Abarth Rallye	Retired (Accident)		
-	8	4/2	(Italy) Alcide Paganelli	(Italy) Ninni Russo	(Italy) Fiat 124 Abarth Rallye	Retired (Accident)		
-	9	2/5	(Italy) Luciano Trombotto	(Italy) Giuseppe Zanchetti	(Italy) Alfa Romeo Alfetta	Retired (Retired)		
-	10	4/2	(Italy) Sergio Barbasio	(Italy) Piero Sodano	(Italy) Fiat 124 Abarth Rallye	Retired (Motor)		
-	11	2/5	(Austria) Georg Fischer	(Austria) Oswald Schurek	(Germany) BMW 2002	Retired (Excluded - Technical Infraction)		
-	15	4/2	(Italy) Claudio de Eccher	(Italy) Claudio Salvador	(Germany) Porsche Carrera	Retired (Differential)		
-	16	4/2	(Italy) Leo Pittoni	(Italy) Serena Pittoni	(Germany) Porsche Carrera	Retired (Retired)		
-	18	4/1	(Italy) Orlando Dall'Ava	(Italy) Sergio Maiga	(Italy) Alfa Romeo Alfetta	Retired (Retired)		
-	19	4/2	(Italy) Gianni Bossetti	(Italy) Mauro Mannini	(Italy) Lancia Beta Coupé	Retired (Retired)		
-	21	4/2	(Italy) Roberto Canbiaghi	(Italy) Gianpiero Bertocci	(Italy) Lancia Stratos HF	Retired (Retired)		
-	24	1/5	(Italy) Gianni Besozzi	(Italy) Alessandro Brusati	(United Kingdom) Triumph Dolomite Sprint	Retired (Retired)		
-	25	1/3	(Italy) Federico Ormezzano	(Italy) Enrico Cartotto	(Italy) Alfa Romeo Alfasud TI	Retired (Retired)		
-	26	1/5	(Italy) Roberto Bauce	(Italy) Paolo Calore	(Germany) Opel Ascona	Retired (Retired)		
-	27	3/3	(Italy) Antonio Carello	(Italy) Daniele Baron	(Italy) Lancia Beta Coupé	Retired (Retired)		
-	28	4/2	(Italy) Gabriele Sciascia	(Italy) Francesco Bullani	(Italy) Lancia Stratos HF	Retired (Retired)		
-	29	3/3	(Italy) Bruno Ferrari	(Italy) Daniele Cianci	(Italy) Lancia Beta Coupé	Retired (Retired)		
-	30	3/3	(Italy) Alberto Brambilla	(Italy) Claudio Mosconi	(Italy) Lancia Fulvia HF	Retired (Retired)		
-	31	1/5	(Italy) Angelo Presotto	(Italy) Luana Vanzi	(Germany) Opel Ascona SR 1.9	Retired (Retired)		
-	33	1/5	(France) Jean-Louis Barailler	(France) Joseph Pantalacci	(Germany) Opel Ascona SR	Retired (Retired)		
-	34	4/2	(Italy) Adartico Vudafieri	(Italy) Fei	(Germany) Porsche Carrera	Retired (Retired)		
-	35	4/2	(Italy) Amedeo Gerbino	(Italy) Walter Torassa	(Italy) Fiat Abarth 124 Spider	Retired (Retired)		
-	36	4/2	(Italy) Roberto Liviero	(Italy) Roberto Cernigai	(Germany) Porsche Carrera	Retired (Retired)		
-	38	4/2	(Italy) Renato Bonora	(Italy) E. Tommaso	(Italy) Fiat 124 Spider	Retired (Retired)		
-	39	4/2	(Italy) Livio Lorenzelli	(Italy) Franco Collorafi	(Italy) Fiat 124 Spider	Retired (Retired)		
-	40	4/2	(Italy) Massimo Gaggero	(Italy) Grossi	(Italy) Fiat 124 Abarth	Retired (Retired)		
-	42	4/1	(Italy) Carli Gianfranco		(France) Alpine-Renault A110	Retired (Retired)		
-	43	4/1	(Italy) Michele Avenoso	(Italy) Sorrentino	(Italy) Lancia Fulvia HF	Retired (Retired)		
-	44	4/1	(Italy) Antonio Codognelli	(Italy) Carlo Cesina	(Italy) Lancia Fulvia 1.3 Coupé HF	Retired (Retired)		
-	45	4/1	(Italy) Fiora	(Italy) Bai	(Italy) Lancia Fulvia HF	Retired (Retired)		
-	46	4/1	(Italy) Rossi	(Italy) Leonardi	(France) Alpine-Renault A110	Retired (Retired)		
-	47	2/5	(Italy) Andrea Betti	(Italy) Luca Betti	(Germany) Opel Ascona	Retired (Retired)		
-	49	2/5	(United Kingdom) Jimmy Rae	(United Kingdom) Henry Liddon	(United Kingdom) Ford Escort 1600 MKI	Retired (Excluded - Technical Infraction)		
-	53	2/5	(Italy) Carlo Tormene	(Germany) Herbert Marecek	(Germany) Opel Ascona	Retired (Retired)		
-	54	2/5	(France) Raymond Chianéa	(France) Jean Chianéa	(United Kingdom) Ford Escort RS	Retired (Retired)		
-	55	2/5	(Italy) Stefano Russo	(Italy) Orsetti	(Germany) Opel Ascona	Retired (Retired)		
-	56	2/5	(Italy) Gianfranco Cantore	(Italy) Giovanni Cantore	(Germany) Opel Ascona	Retired (Retired)		
-	59	2/5	(Italy) de Mazza	(Italy) Cervone	(Germany) Opel Ascona	Retired (Retired)		
-	60	2/5	(Monaco) Franco da Sacco	(Italy) Cardone	(Italy) Fiat 125 S	Retired (Retired)		
-	61	???	(Italy) Renato Girola	(Italy) Roberto Scialdo	(United Kingdom) Ford Capri	Retired (Retired)		
-	62	2/4	(France) Gérard Guillaume	(France) Odile Chalvin	(Germany) Volkswagen 1300	Retired (Retired)		
-	64	2/4	(Italy) Giovanetti	(Italy) Masturzo	(United Kingdom) Ford Escort Twin Cam	Retired (Excluded - Technical Infraction)		
-	65	2/4	(Italy) Daniele Camerana	(Italy) Bibl	(France) Renault 12 Gordini	Retired (Retired)		
-	66	2/4	(Italy) Gianni Sisto	(Italy) Elda Ghezzi	(France) Renault 12 Gordini	Retired (Retired)		
-	67	3/3	(Italy) Ferrari	(Italy) Aloi	(Italy) Fiat 124 Abarth Rallye	Retired (Retired)		
-	68	3/3	(Italy) Roberto de Vincenti	(Italy) Ivo Motroni	(Italy) Fiat 124 Abarth	Retired (Retired)		
-	74	3/2	(France) Christian Gardavot	(France) Danielle Roux	(France) Alpine-Renault A110	Retired (Retired)		
-	76	3/2	(Italy) Roberto de Maestri	(Italy) Chicco de Maestri	(Italy) Lancia Fulvia HF	Retired (Retired)		
-	78	3/2	(Italy) Gianfranco Pons	(Italy) Emilio Vinotti	(Italy) Lancia Fulvia HF	Retired (Retired)		
-	81	2/2	(Italy) Marco Cerisola	(Italy) Renzo Uberto	(Italy) Fiat 128 Rally	Retired (Retired)		
-	82	2/2	(Italy) Giovanni Rossi	(Italy) Corrado Ferretti	(Italy) Fiat 128 Coupé	Retired (Retired)		
-	83	2/2	(Italy) Elio Raimondi	(Italy) Giampiero Vai	(France) Citroën GS 1220	Retired (Retired)		
-	84	4/2	(Italy) Beppino Rossi	(Italy) di Rocca	(Italy) Fiat 128	Retired (Retired)		
-	85	2/2	(Italy) Luigi Fanecco	(Italy) F. Rosa	(France) Simca Rallye 2	Retired (Retired)		
-	86	2/2	(Italy) di Baldassarre	(Italy) Malacrida	(Italy) Fiat 128 C	Retired (Retired)		
-	89	2/2	(Italy) Mario Cassarini	(Italy) Domenico Cassarini	(Italy) Fiat 128 Coupé	Retired (Retired)		
-	91	1/5	(Italy) Silvio Dus	(Italy) Jeff Augustin	(Germany) Opel Ascona	Retired (Retired)		
-	92	1/5	(Italy) Mattas	(Italy) Ratto	(Germany) Opel Ascona	Retired (Retired)		
-	93	1/5	(Italy) Dario Cerrato	(Italy) Giuseppe Cerri	(Germany) Opel Ascona	Retired (Retired)		
-	94	1/5	(Italy) Angiolino Ziviani	(Italy) Crespi	(Germany) Opel Ascona	Retired (Retired)		
-	95	1/5	(Spain) Juan Carlos Pradera	(Spain) Ricardo Comyn	(Spain) SEAT 1430/1800	Retired (Retired)		
-	97	1/5	(Italy) de Vecchi	(Italy) Daniele Robba	(Germany) Opel Ascona	Retired (Retired)		
-	98	1/5	(Italy) A. Luigi Gigi Boeri	(Italy) Mario Rebaudo	(Germany) Opel Ascona	Retired (Retired)		
-	99	1/5	(Italy) Corzino		(Germany) Opel Ascona	Retired (Retired)		
-	100	1/5	(Italy) Pino Giuseppe Ceccato	(Italy) Stefano Zozzolotto	(Italy) Fiat 124 S	Retired (Retired)		
-	101	1/5	(Italy) Tetti Cesare	(Italy) Robazza	(Italy) Fiat 124 S	Retired (Retired)		
-	102	2/2	(Italy) Domenico Marenco	(Italy) Gambera	(Italy) Fiat 128 C	Retired (Retired)		
-	107	1/3	(Italy) Mario Quaciari	(Italy) di Muzzio	(Italy) Fiat 128 C	Retired (Retired)		
-	108	1/3	(Italy) Bruno Aimar	(Italy) Causa	(Italy) Fiat 128 C	Retired (Retired)		
-	109	1/3	(Italy) Luciano Arroni	(Italy) Oddo	(Italy) Fiat 128 C	Retired (Retired)		
-	111	1/3	(Italy) Pertile	(Italy) Stillitano	(France) Simca Rallye 2	Retired (Retired)		
-	112	1/3	(Italy) Mario Tarditi	(Italy) Gianni Beltrami	(Italy) Innocenti Mini Cooper	Retired (Retired)		
-	114	1/3	(Italy) Guglielmo Paletta	(Italy) Carlo Cavicchi	(Italy) Fiat 128	Retired (Retired)		
-	115	1/3	(Italy) Vincenzo Leporace	(Italy) Boggero	(Italy) Fiat 128	Retired (Retired)		
-	119	1/1	(Italy) Antonio Parisi	(Italy) Maurizio Elia	(Italy) Autobianchi A112 Abarth 58HP	Retired (Retired)		
-	120	1/1	(Italy) Vittorio Bigoni	(Italy) Gian Carlo Bigoni	(Italy) Autobianchi A112 Abarth	Retired (Retired)		

Source:eWRC Results

== Championship Standings after event ==
Rank	Manufacturer	Event								Total points
Rank	Manufacturer	POR (Portugal)	KEN (Kenya)	FIN (Finland)	ITA (Italy)	CAN (Canada)	USA (United States)	GBR (United Kingdom)	FRA (France)	Total points
1	(Italy) Fiat	20	1	12	15	-	-	-	-	48
2	(Italy) Lancia	-	12	-	20	-	-	-	-	32
3	(United States) Ford	2	2	20	-	-	-	-	-	24
4	(Germany) Porsche	-	15	-	8	-	-	-	-	23
5	(Japan) Mitsubishi	-	20	-	-	-	-	-	-	20
6	(Japan) Datsun	8	10	-	-	-	-	-	-	18
7	(Germany) Opel	-	-	3	12	-	-	-	-	15
8	(Japan) Toyota	10	-	-	-	-	-	-	-	10
8	(Sweden) Saab	-	-	10	-	-	-	-	-	10
10	(France) Alpine-Renault	6	-	-	-	-	-	-	-	6
12	(Germany) BMW	4	-	-	-	-	-	-	-	4
12	(France) Peugeot	-	4	-	-	-	-	-	-	4
13	(France) Citroën	3	-	-	-	-	-	-	-	3
