= Carrera =

Carrera may refer to:

== People ==
- Carrera (surname)

== Cars and racing ==
- Carrera Panamericana, Mexican sports car racing event
  - La Carrera Panamericana, a video of the Carrera Panamericana race
- Porsche Carrera, several models of sports cars by the German company Porsche
- Carrera, a German-Austrian slot car brand
- Sally Carrera, a gynomorphic Porsche motorcar, as one of the lead characters in Pixar's film Cars (2006)

== Fashion and apparel ==
- Carrera Sunglasses, producers of Carrera brand sunglasses and sports eyewear
- TAG Heuer Carrera, Swiss made watches and chronographs

== Music ==
- "Carrera" (song), 2009 single by Karl Wolf
- "Carrera" (song), from the 2024 The Alexander Technique (album) by Rex Orange County

== Places ==
- General Carrera Lake, lake between Argentina and Chile
- Carrera Island, an island belonging to the Republic of Trinidad and Tobago
- Metro Martín Carrera, station on the Mexico City Metro

== Other ==
- Advanced Aeromarine Carrera, ultralight aircraft built by Advanced Aeromarine
- Carrera de cintas, traditional sport often played during the feria patronal in Spain and Latin America
- Carrera (cycling team), an Italian bicycle-racing team of the 1980s and 1990s
- Carrera Autopodistica, Italian competition of gravity racing
- Carrera, a type of road in Colombian road nomenclature.

== See also ==
- Carrara (disambiguation)
