= Carara =

Carara may refer to:

- Carara Kicks F.C.
- Carara National Park, Costa Rica

== See also ==
- Carrara (disambiguation)
- Karara (disambiguation)
