= Walter Boyce =

Canadian rally driver (born 1946)

Personal information
- Nationality: (Canada) Canadian
- Born: 25 October 1946 (age 80); Ottawa, Canada

World Rally Championship record
- Years active: 1973–1974, 1977–1978, 1986
- Co-driver: (Canada) Doug Woods (United Kingdom) Stuart Gray (Canada) Robin Edwardes (Canada) Martin Headland
- Teams: Toyota, British Leyland, Volkswagen
- Rallies: 6
- Championships: 0
- Rally wins: 1
- Podiums: 2
- Stage wins: 52
- Total points: 0
- First rally: 1973 Press-on-Regardless Rally
- First win: 1973 Press-on-Regardless Rally
- Last rally: 1986 Olympus Rally

Walter Boyce (born 25 October 1946) is a Canadian former rally driver. He is the only Canadian to win a World Rally Championship event, which he managed at the 1973 Press-on-Regardless Rally in the United States. He took his second podium finish at the 1974 Rally of the Rideau Lakes in his home country, finishing third behind Sandro Munari and Simo Lampinen. Boyce was inducted into the Canadian Motorsport Hall of Fame in 2003.

== Racing Record ==
=== Complete IMC results ===
Year	Entrant	Car	1	2	3	4	5	6	7	8	9
1972	Walter Boyce	Toyota Corolla Levin	MON	SWE	KEN	MAR	GRE	AUT	ITA	USA; 6	GBR

=== Complete WRC results ===
Year	Entrant	Car	1	2	3	4	5	6	7	8	9	10	11	12	13	WDC	Pts
1973	Walter Boyce	Toyota Corolla Levin	MON	SWE	POR	KEN	MOR	GRE	POL	FIN	AUT	ITA	USA; 1	GBR	FRA	N/A	N/A
1974	Walter Boyce	Toyota Celica 1600	POR	KEN	FIN	ITA	CAN; 3									N/A	N/A
1974	Toyota / Canadian Motor Industries	Toyota Celica 1600						USA; Ret	GBR	FRA						N/A	N/A
1977	British Leyland	Triumph TR7	MON	SWE	POR	KEN	NZL	GRC	FIN	CAN; 8	ITA	FRA	GBR			N/A	N/A
1978	Walter Boyce	Saab 99 EMS	MON	SWE	KEN	POR	GRE	FIN	CAN; 10	ITA	CIV	FRA	GBR			N/A	N/A
1986	Volkswagen Sport	Volkswagen Golf GTI 16V	MON	SWE	POR	KEN	FRA	GRE	NZL	ARG	FIN	CIV	ITA	GBR	USA; DSQ	NC	0
