= Karara =

Karara may refer to:

- Karara, Queensland
- Karara and Lochada Important Bird Area, Western Australia
- Karara, a fictional character from Sgt. Frog.
- Karara mine
- Karara railway

== See also ==
- Amir Karara, Egyptian actor
- Gymnopilus karrara, species of mushroom
- Carrara (disambiguation)
- Carara (disambiguation)
