= 1974 Rallye de Portugal =

1974 Rally of Portugal 8º TAP Rallye de Portugal
Round 1 of the 1974 World Rally Championship season
Next event →
- Host country: Portugal
- Rally base: Estoril
- Dates run: March 20 – 23 1974
- Stages: 32 (454 km; 282 miles)
- Stage surface: Asphalt and gravel
- Overall distance: 2,057.20 km (1,278.28 miles)

Statistics
- Crews: 125 at start, 36 at finish

Overall results
- Overall winner: (Italy) Raffaele Pinto (Italy) Arnaldo Bernacchini (Italy) Fiat (Italy) Fiat Abarth 124 Rally

The 1974 Rally of Portugal (formally the 8º TAP Rallye de Portugal) was the first round of the 1974 World Rally Championship season after the oil crisis forced the cancellation of the Monte Carlo and Swedish rallies.

== Report ==
As with all of the WRC rounds in 1974, there was only a manufacturer championship, so only manufacturers results were counted for points. Only the top finishing car for each manufacturer counted. Fiat locked out the podium places but only picked up 20 points in the championship due to this rule. An advantage is gained though, because the next finishing manufacturer can only pick up the points available for where their highest driver finished - in this case, Toyota took 10 points for Ove Andersson's 4th place in a Toyota Corolla.

== Results ==
Pos.	Driver	Co-driver	Car	Time	Difference	Points
1974 Rallye de Portugal results
1.	(Italy) Raffaele Pinto	(Italy) Arnaldo Bernacchini	(Italy) Fiat Abarth 124 Rally	6:26:15	0.0	20
2.	(Italy) Alcide Paganelli	(Italy) Ninni Russo	(Italy) Fiat Abarth 124 Rally	6:30:12	3.57	
3.	(Finland) Markku Alén	(Finland) Ilkka Kivimäki	(Italy) Fiat Abarth 124 Rally	6:37:17	11.02	
4.	(Sweden) Ove Andersson	(Sweden) Arne Hertz	(Japan) Toyota Corolla	6:40:54	14.39	10
5.	(Sweden) Harry Källström	(Sweden) Claes Billstam	(Japan) Datsun 260Z	6:54:27	28.12	8
6.	(France) Bob Neyret	(France) Yveline Vanoni	(France) Alpine-Renault A110 1800	7:04:18	38.03	6
7.	(Austria) Georg Fischer	(Austria) Harald Gottlieb	(Germany) BMW 2002	7:05:02	38.47	4
8.	(Portugal) Francisco Romãozinho	(Portugal) João Nogueira da Silva	(France) Citroën GS	7:17:04	50.49	3
9.	(United Kingdom) Chris Sclater	(United Kingdom) Neil Wilson	(United Kingdom) Ford Escort RS1600	7:26:59	1:00.44	2
10.	(Portugal) António Borges	(Portugal) Miguel Sottomayor	(Italy) Fiat 124 Sport Spider	7:27:55	1:01.40	
11.	(Finland) Johan Wiklund	(Sweden) Lars-Erik Karlsson	(Germany) BMW 2002	7:33:32	1:07.17	
12.	(Portugal) Américo Nunes	(Portugal) António Morais	(Germany) Porsche 911	7:38:32	1:12.17	
13.	(Portugal) Celso Silva	(Portugal) António Vicente	(Japan) Datsun 1200	7:48:58	1:22.43	
14.	(United Kingdom) Chris Wathen	(United Kingdom) Tim Bosence	(United Kingdom) Ford Escort RS 1600	7:59:12	1:32.57	
15.	(Portugal) António Ferreira da Cunha	(Portugal) Carlos Resende	(Japan) Datsun 1200	8:11:15	1:45.00	
16.	(Portugal) Jorge Ortigão	(Portugal) Pedro d'Abreu	(Japan) Mazda 818	8:14:22	1:48.07	
17.	(Portugal) Nuno Gonçalo do Botelho	(Portugal) Augusto Roxo	(France) Citroën DS 21	8:14:37	1:48.22	
18.	(United Kingdom) Will Sparrow	(United Kingdom) Barry Hughes	(United Kingdom) Hillman Avenger	8:24:20	1:58.05	
19.	(Portugal) Pedro Queiroz	(Portugal) Dico Mendes	(Germany) Opel 1904 SR	8:25:12	1:58.57	
20.	(Portugal) António Rodrigues	(Portugal) A. Mergulhão	(Japan) Toyota Celica	8:25:22	1:59.07	
21.	(Portugal) Adérito Parente	(Portugal) Pedro Vareta	(Japan) Datsun 1200	8:33:37	2:07.22	
22.	(United Kingdom) Anthony Stilwell	(United Kingdom) Ronald Crellin	(Italy) Fiat 125	8:37:34	2:11.19	
23.	(Portugal) António Cunha Lino	(Portugal) S. Mendonça	(Germany) Opel 1904 SR	8:39:30	2:13.15	
24.	(Portugal) Adolfo Sampaio	(Portugal) José Bernardo	(France) Citroën GS	8:42:10	2:15.55	
25.	(Portugal) Mário Costa	(Portugal) Luís Calafate	(Japan) Datsun 1200	8:42:13	2:15.58	
26.	(Portugal) Manuel Coentro	(Portugal) Pedro Martins	(Germany) BMW 2002	8:44:41	2:18.26	
27.	(Portugal) Carlos Amaral	(Portugal) Matos Penalva	(United Kingdom) Ford Escort RS 1600	8:45:28	2:19.13	
28.	(Austria) Leopold Mayer	(Austria) Oswald Schurek	(Sweden) Volvo 164	8:49:49	2:23.34	
29.	(Portugal) João Nabais	(Portugal) Pedro Almeida	(United Kingdom) Morris Marina	8:52:24	2:26.29	
30.	(Portugal) Manuel Inácio	(Portugal) José Dias	(Germany) Opel 1904 SR	8:52:40	2:26.25	
31.	(Portugal) Rui Guimarães	(Portugal) Guilherme Salvador	(Germany) Opel 1904 SR	8:55:28	2:29.13	
32.	(Portugal) José Pedra	(Portugal) Ricardina Pedra	(Germany) Opel 1904 SR	9:13:35	2:47.20	
33.	(Portugal) Evaristo Saraiva	(Portugal) J. Emerenciano	(Italy) Fiat 127	9:20:20	2:54.05	
34.	(Portugal) Ramos Ruella	(Portugal) Eric Macário	(Germany) BMW 2002	9:22:28	2:56.13	
35.	(Sweden) Bengt Lundström	(Sweden) Stig Johansson	(Japan) Toyota Celica	9:27:46	3:01.31	
36.	(Austria) Ingrid Weber	(Austria) Brigitte Scheibelreiter	(Germany) BMW 2002	9:42:48	3:16.33	
-	(Germany) Achim Warmbold	(France) Jean Todt	(Germany) Opel Ascona 1.9 SR	Retired (Suspension)		
-	(Germany) Walter Röhrl	(Germany) Jochen Berger	(Germany) Opel Ascona 1.9 SR	Retired (Engine)		
-	(Sweden) Björn Waldegård	(Sweden) Hans Thorszelius	(Japan) Toyota Celica 1600 GT	Retired (Electrical problem)		
-	(United Kingdom) Tony Fall	(United Kingdom) Robin Turvey	(Germany) Opel Ascona 1.9 SR	Retired (Front suspension)		
-	(Sweden) Ingvar Carlsson	(Sweden) Sölve Andreasson	(Japan) Datsun 260Z	Retired (Engine)		
-	(Italy) Sergio Barbasio	(Italy) Piero Sodano	(Italy) Fiat Abarth 124 Rallye	Retired (Accident)		
-	(United Kingdom) Brian Culcheth	(United Kingdom) Johnstone Syer	(United Kingdom) Triumph Dolomite Sprint	Retired (Direction)		
-	(Portugal) Luís Netto	(Portugal) João Canas Mendes	(Italy) Fiat 124 Sport Spider 1600	Retired		
-	(Portugal) Mário Figueiredo	(Portugal) Carlos Barata	(Japan) Datsun 260Z	Retired (Engine)		
-	(Portugal) Manuel Queiróz Pereira	(Portugal) Amaral Mira	(Germany) Opel 1904 SR	Retired		
-	(Italy) Giovanni Salvi	(Portugal) Luigi Valle	(Italy) Fiat 124 Sport Spider 1600	Retired		
-	(Portugal) Pereira Gomes	(Portugal) Pereira Almeida	(Germany) Opel 1904 SR	Retired		
-	(Portugal) António Carlos Oliveira	(Portugal) Eduardo Bon de Sousa	(Japan) Datsun 180B	Retired		
-	(Portugal) António Martorell	(Portugal) Luís Pedreira	(Germany) Opel 1904 SR	Retired		
-	(Portugal) Jorge Nascimento	(Portugal) José Nobre	(Japan) Mazda RX-2	Retired		
-	(Portugal) Rui Gonçalves	(Portugal) João Baptista	(United Kingdom) Austin Mini 1275 GT	Retired		
-	(United Kingdom) Tony Fowkes	(United Kingdom) David Kirkham	(United Kingdom) Ford Escort RS1600	Retired (Oil)		
-	(Portugal) Luís Salles Grade	(Portugal) Manuel Romão	(United Kingdom) Morris Marina 1.8 TC Coupé	Retired		
-	(Austria) Walter Zöckl	(Austria) Johann Dieber	(Germany) BMW 2002 Ti	Retired		
-	(Portugal) Renato Miranda Xavier	(Portugal) Manuel Ferreira	(Japan) Datsun 1200	Retired (Accident)		
-	(Portugal) Fernando Baptista	(Portugal) Francisco Coureiro	(United Kingdom) Austin Maxi 1800	Retired		
-	(Portugal) Henrique Bastos Burnay	(Portugal) George Villar	(United Kingdom) Morris Marina 1.8 TC Coupé	Retired		
-	(United Kingdom) Norman Anstis	(United Kingdom) John Haswell	(United Kingdom) Ford Escort RS1600	Retired (Engine)		
-	(Portugal) Pedro Cortêz	(Portugal) João Teixeira Gomes	(Japan) Datsun 1200 GX	Retired		
-	(United Kingdom) Barry Hooper	(United Kingdom) Luxton	(United Kingdom) Ford Escort RS1600	Retired (Engine)		
-	(Portugal) Mendes Santinho	(Portugal) Manuel Casimiro	(Japan) Datsun 1200 GX	Retired (Accident on the connection)		
-	(United Kingdom) Alvin Russell	(United Kingdom) Tony Cowdale	(United Kingdom) Ford Escort RS1600	Retired		
-	(Portugal) Barbosa da Gama	(Portugal) João Anjos	(United Kingdom) Morris Mini 1275 GT	Retired		
-	(United Kingdom) Bob Bean	(United Kingdom) David Greenwood	(United Kingdom) Ford Escort Mexico	Retired (Accident)		
-	(Portugal) Bianchi de Aguiar	(Portugal) Bianchi de Aguiar	(United Kingdom) Austin Maxi 1800	Retired		
-	(Austria) Johann Fennes	(Austria) Josef Unger	(United Kingdom) Ford Escort Mexico	Retired		
-	(Austria) Helmut Doppelreiter	(Austria) Helmut Sicheritz	(Germany) Volkswagen Käfer 1303 S	Retired		
-	(Portugal) Carlos Fontaínhas	(Portugal) Rogério Seromenho	(United Kingdom) Ford Escort Twin Cam	Retired (Half shaft)		
-	(Portugal) Vasco Pereira Coutinho	(Portugal) José Tavares Pinto	(France) Alpine-Renault A110 1600S	Retired		
-	(Portugal) Rui Sampaio	(Portugal) R. Riobom	(Japan) Datsun 1200 GX	Retired		
-	(Austria) Günther Roschko	(Austria) Peter Pant	(Italy) Fiat 124 Sport Spider 1600	Retired		
-	(Germany) Jochen Schweiger	(Germany) Otto Trieschmann	(Germany) BMW 2002 Tii	Retired		
-	(Sweden) Hans Britth	(Sweden) Bo Carlsson	(United Kingdom) Ford Capri 2300	Retired		
-	(Denmark) Poul Christian Olsen	(Denmark) Karsten Richardt	(Germany) BMW 2002 Tii	Retired (Gearbox)		
-	(Denmark) Erik Berth	(Denmark) Åge Winther Nielsen	(Germany) BMW 2002 Tii	Retired		
-	(Finland) Juha Leponiemi	(Finland) Pekka Kyröhonka	(Germany) BMW 2002 Tii	Retired		
-	(Denmark) Kurt Schärfe	(Denmark) Frede Haurbach	(Germany) Opel Ascona 1.9 SR	Retired		
-	(Denmark) P.E. Peterson	(Denmark) Kurt Mortensen	(Sweden) Saab 96 V4	Retired (Suspension)		
-	(Finland) Kelle Möller	(Finland) Erkki Lahtinen	(France) Simca 1100 S	Retired		
-	(Finland) Torbjörn Lundqvist	(Finland) A. Lundqvist	(Japan) Honda N600	Retired		
-	(Sweden) Ted Hansson	(Sweden) Mats Andersson	(Germany) Opel Ascona 1.9 SR	Retired		
-	(Portugal) A. Borges Sousa	(Portugal) R. Borges Sousa	(United Kingdom) Morris Mini 1275 GT	Retired		
-	(Portugal) Luís Sena de Vasconcelos	(Portugal) Francisco Pina de Morais	(Japan) Datsun 1200 GX	Retired (Time limit exceeded)		
-	(Portugal) Martins Teixeira	(Portugal) António Magalhães	(United Kingdom) Austin Maxi 1750	Retired		
-	(Portugal) Rogério A. Carvalho	(Portugal) José Araújo	(Germany) Opel 1904 SR	Retired		
-	(Portugal) Meireles da Costa	(Portugal) José Luís Costa	(Germany) Volkswagen 1303 S	Retired		
-	(Portugal) António Campos	(Portugal) Victor Sousa	(Japan) Datsun 1200 GX	Retired		
-	(Sweden) Bertil Johansson	(Sweden) Patrick Toorell	(Germany) Opel Ascona 1.9 SR	Retired		
-	(Portugal) José Romariz	(Portugal) Anselmo Garcia	(Japan) Datsun 1800 SSS	Retired		
-	(Portugal) António Oliveira	(Portugal) Carlos Melo	(Germany) BMW 2002 Schnitzer	Retired		
-	(Portugal) Carlos Pinto	(Portugal) Jorge Tavares da Silva	(Germany) Opel 1904 SR	Retired		
-	(Portugal) Baptista Andrade	(Portugal) J. Monteiro	(United Kingdom) Ford Capri 1300	Retired		
-	(Portugal) Carlos Brederode	(Portugal) Martim Macedo	(Germany) BMW 2002	Retired		
-	(Portugal) Porfirio Oliveira	(Portugal) Duarte Reis	(Germany) BMW 2002	Retired		
-	(Portugal) Américo Fernandes	(Portugal) Carlos Silva	(Germany) BMW 2002	Retired		
-	(Portugal) João Carlos Nunes	(Portugal) Gabriel Costa	(United Kingdom) Vauxhall Firenza 2300	Retired		
-	(Switzerland) Paul-Marc Meylan	(Switzerland) René-Claude Herren	(Germany) BMW 2002 Tii	Retired		
-	(Belgium) Jó Wéry	(Belgium) Michele Midre	(Germany) BMW 2002 Tii	Retired		
-	(Belgium) "Ringo"	(Belgium) Fred Maes	(United Kingdom) Ford Escort Mexico	Retired		
-	(United Kingdom) Patrick Leeson	(Belgium) Eric Symens	(United Kingdom) Vauxhall Firenza 2300	Retired		
-	(France) Jacques Régis	(France) J.P. Lefevre	(Germany) Opel Ascona 1.9 SR	Retired		
-	(Portugal) António Romaneiro	(Portugal) F. Saraiva	(Japan) Mazda 818 Coupé	Retired		
-	(Portugal) José Nunes Batista	(Portugal) M. Costa e Silva	(Italy) Fiat 125 S	Retired		
-	(Portugal) Fernando Marques Baptista	(Portugal) Isabel Baptista	(Germany) Opel 1604 S	Retired		
-	(Portugal) Carlos Pereira	(Portugal) Vilela Silva	Datsun 1200	Retired		
-	(Portugal) Manuel Rolo	(Portugal) Álvaro Barreiros	(Japan) Datsun 1600 SSS	Retired (Accident)		
-	(Portugal) Jorge Azevedo		(Germany) BMW 2002	Retired		
-	(Portugal) Arnaldo Ribeiro		(Germany) Opel 1904 SR	Retired		
-	(Portugal) Jorge Barreto	(Portugal) Fernando Faria	(Japan) Datsun 1200	Retired		
-	(Portugal) Manuel C. Teixeira	(Portugal) José Tigre	(Japan) Datsun 1200	Retired		
-	(Portugal) Fernando Meireles		(France) Simca Rallye 2	Retired		
-	(Portugal) Carlos Antunes	(Portugal) Fernando Castelo Branco	(United Kingdom) Vauxhall Viva 1800	Retired		
-	(Portugal) João Cerqueira	(Portugal) Rui Caravilha	(Japan) Datsun 1200	Retired (Accident)		
-	(Portugal) Rui Lages	(Portugal) Abel Santos	(Japan) Mazda 818	Retired		
-	(Portugal) Miguel Oliveira	(Portugal) Gomes Almeida	(Germany) Opel 1904 SR	Retired		
-	(Portugal) Carlos Torres	(Portugal) Valente Pereira	(Italy) Fiat 125 S	Retired		
-	(Portugal) Alexandre Barros	(Portugal) J.A. Sequeira	(United Kingdom) Austin Mini Cooper S	Retired		
-	(Portugal) Duarte Bittencourt	(Portugal) F. Botelho	(United Kingdom) Austin Mini Cooper S	Retired		

Source: Independent WRC archive, eWRC Results

== Championship standings after the event ==
Rank	Manufacturer	Event								Total points
Rank	Manufacturer	POR (Portugal)	KEN (Kenya)	FIN (Finland)	ITA (Italy)	CAN (Canada)	USA (United States)	GBR (United Kingdom)	FRA (France)	Total points
1	(Italy) Fiat	20	-	-	-	-	-	-	-	20
2	(Japan) Toyota	10	-	-	-	-	-	-	-	10
3	(Japan) Datsun	8	-	-	-	-	-	-	-	8
4	(France) Alpine-Renault	6	-	-	-	-	-	-	-	6
5	(Germany) BMW	4	-	-	-	-	-	-	-	4
6	(France) Citroën	3	-	-	-	-	-	-	-	3
7	(United States) Ford	2	-	-	-	-	-	-	-	2
