= Carrara (surname) =

Carrara is a surname. Notable people with the surname include:

- Benoît Carrara (1926–1993), skier
- Daniel Carrara (born 1982), Argentine footballer
- Émile Carrara (1925–1992) (1925–1992), French bicycle racer and track cyclist
- Giovanni Carrara (born 1968), baseball player
- Matteo Carrara (born 1979), rider
- Michela Carrara (born 1997), biathlete
- Pieralberto Carrara (born 1966), biathlete and Olympic medallist
- Sandro Carrara, Swiss engineer

== See also ==
- Leslie Carrara-Rudolph, puppeteer
