= 1973 Press-on-Regardless Rally =

Rallying motorsport event

1973 Press-on-Regardless Rally 25th Press-on-Regardless Rally
Round 11 of the 1973 World Rally Championship season
← Previous event	Next event →
- Host country: United States
- Rally base: Detroit, Michigan
- Dates run: November 1, 1973 – November 4, 1973
- Stages: 85 (549.15 km; 341.23 miles)
- Stage surface: Gravel
- Overall distance: 3,284.15 km (2,040.68 miles)

Statistics
- Crews: 58 at start, 23 at finish

Overall results
- Overall winner: (Canada) Walter Boyce (Canada) Doug Woods (Japan) Toyota Motorsport; Toyota Corolla

The 1973 Press-On-Regardless Rally (formally the 25th Press-On-Regardless Rally) was the eleventh round of the inaugural World Rally Championship season. Run at the outset of November in Michigan in the United States. The rally was run entirely on gravel.

== Report ==
Due to a combination of scheduling and location, the event was not attended by most European competitors. Giving teams only two weeks following the preceding Sanremo Rally to travel across the Atlantic Ocean, and then giving even less time for a return to Europe for the following RAC Rally in England, proved unrealistic for most teams, and in the event, only a few teams from Poland made the trip with their domestic Polski Fiat 125p vehicles. As it turned out, the event was primarily a local affair, with a Canadian, Walter Boyce, taking the win ahead of a field of American drivers.

In 1973, and for several years afterward, only manufacturers were given points for finishes in WRC events. With the teams focused on the prestigious RAC Rally upcoming, and with the year's championship already sewn up by Alpine Renault, the works teams did not make an effort to compete in the American leg of the championship. Toyota became the beneficiary as it was a Corolla that carried Boyce to victory, while other makes popular on the North American market filled out the ranks. Datsuns were particularly prevalent—especially the locally popular Datsun 510—and Polski Fiat was rewarded for their effort in making the trip by a finish in the points, but overall, the results factored little into the factory efforts for the championship.

== Results ==
1973 Press-on-Regardless Rally results
Finish	Total time	Car #	Driver Co-driver	Car	Mfr. points
1	6 h : 58 m : 28.2 s	110	(Canada) Walter Boyce (Canada) Doug Woods	(Japan) Toyota Corolla	20
2	7 h : 22 m : 43.2 s	116	(United States) Jim Walker (United States) Terry Palmer	(Sweden) Volvo 142 S	15
3	7 h : 33 m : 36.0 s	105	(United States) John Smiskol (United States) Carol Smiskol	(Japan) Datsun 240Z	12
4	7 h : 39 m : 1.8 s	114	(United States) John Buffum (United States) Wayne Zitkus	(United Kingdom) Ford Escort RS1600	10
5	7 h : 45 m : 0.6 s	127	(United States) John Rodgers (United States) Erik Brooks	(Japan) Datsun 1600 SSS	
6	7 h : 57 m : 30.6 s	108	(Poland) Robert Mucha (Poland) Ryszard Żyszkowski	(Poland) Polski Fiat 125p	6
7	8 h : 4 m : 54.6 s	123	(United States) Bill Dodd (United States) Rudy Kren	(United Kingdom) Ford Capri 2600	
8	8 h : 8 m : 12.0 s	130	(United States) Jim Callon (United States) Gary Hays	(Japan) Datsun 510	
9	8 h : 9 m : 28.2 s	136	(United States) Steve Dorr (United States) Rick Andersson	(Japan) Datsun 510	
10	8 h : 16 m : 12.6 s	121	(United States) Chuck McLaren (United States) Doug Leverton	(Japan) Datsun 510	
11	8 h : 20 m : 47.4 s (Note: The final results indicate a score of 50879 (8:28:47.4), however the stage results indicate a time of 50079 (8:20:47.4).)	117	(Poland) Andrzej Jaroszewicz (Poland) Zbigniew Dziadura	(Poland) Polski Fiat 125p	
12	8 h : 21 m : 40.8 s	122	(United States) John Chalmers (United States) William Potvin	(Japan) Datsun 510	
13	8 h : 35 m : 42.6 s	113	(Canada) Gary Neil (Canada) Don Ramsay	(Japan) Datsun 1600 SSS	
14	8 h : 35 m : 58.8 s	160	(Kenya) Edgar Herrmann (United States) Joe LeBeau	(Japan) Subaru GL	
15	8 h : 39 m : 10.8 s	120	(Poland) Marek Varisella (Poland) Janina Jedynak	(Poland) Polski Fiat 125p	
Retired (accident)		104	(Canada) Taisto Heinonen (Canada) John Bellefleur	(Germany) Opel Manta	
Retired (engine)		106	(United States) Erhard Dahm (United States) Tom Grishaw	(United States) Jeep Wagoneer	
Retired (engine)		107	(United States) Gene Henderson (United States) Ken Pogue	(United States) Jeep Wagoneer	
Retired (excluded)		109	(United States) Scott Harvey (United States) Ralph Beckman	(Japan) Dodge Colt	
Retired (accident)		112	(United States) Bob Hourihan (United Kingdom) Geraint Phillips	(Japan) Datsun 1800 SSS	
Retired (time barred)		147	(United States) Randy Graves (United States) Ruth Heidel	(France) Alpine-Renault A110	

== Championship standings after the event ==
1973 World Rally Championship for Manufacturers points standings after round 11
After round 11		Team	Season end	
Position	Points	Team	Position	Points
1	127	(France) Alpine Renault	1	147
2	84	(Italy) Fiat	2	84
3	46	(United Kingdom) Ford	3	76
4	42	(Sweden) Saab	5	42
5	34	(Japan) Datsun	6	34
6	34	(Sweden) Volvo	4	44
7	33	(France) Citroën	7	33
8	25	(Japan) Toyota	10	25
9	24	(Germany) BMW	8	28
10	24	(Germany) Porsche	9	27
11	18	(Poland) Polski Fiat	12	18
12	17	(Italy) Lancia	13	17
13	15	(East Germany) Wartburg	14	15
14	15	(Germany) Opel	11	25
15	14	(Germany) Volkswagen	15	15
16	13	(France) Peugeot	16	13
17	4	(Japan) Mitsubishi	17	4
18	3	(Czechoslovakia) Škoda	18	3
19	1	(Germany) Audi	20	2
