= 1974 World Rally Championship =

2nd season of the World Rally Championship

Champions
- World Manufacturers' Champion: Lancia

Seasons
- ← 1973 1975 →

The 1974 World Rally Championship was the second season of the Fédération Internationale de l'Automobile (FIA) World Rally Championship (WRC). Due to the worldwide oil crisis, it was significantly reduced from its inaugural season, consisting of 8 events versus the previous 13 events. Notably absent were the Monte Carlo and Swedish rallies, though these would return the next year and remain part of the series as of 2026. The Austria rally would never return to the WRC calendar, while the Poland rally would only return in 2009. 1974 was the only year the WRC held two events in North America, though it would mark the last year for both of these events on the world stage.

Alpine-Renault proved unable to repeat its dominance from the previous year, with Italian manufacturers Lancia and Fiat vying for the title through the year. Fiat's Abarth 124 gained an early lead with a win at Monte Carlo, but fell to a strong performance by Lancia's Stratos HF which won three rallies, placing second again. Lancia's championship was the first of three consecutive WRC titles it would win through 1976 as well as the first of its record ten WRC manufacturer's championships. The Ford Escort was able to win a pair of rallies, repeating Ford's third-place finish of the previous year.

From 1973 to 1978, the WRC only awarded a season championship for the winning manufacturer. Scoring was given for the highest placing entry for each manufacturer. Thus if a particular manufacturer was to place 2nd, 4th, and 10th, they would receive points for 2nd place only. However, the manufacturer would still gain an advantage in scoring from its other entries, as the points for the 4th and 10th place entries would be denied to other manufacturers.

== Calendar ==
Due to the global oil crisis, the WRC calendar was reduced to eight rounds with the cancellation of the Monte Carlo, Swedish and Acropolis rallies. Morocco, Poland and Austria were dropped after 1973 with the Canadian Rally of the Rideau Lakes making its debut on the calendar.

Round	Rally name	Surface	Dates
1	Rallye de Portugal	Mixed (Tarmac - Gravel)	20–23 March
2	(Kenya) Safari Rally	Gravel	11–15 April
3	(Finland) 1000 Lakes Rally	Gravel	2–4 August
4	(Italy) Rallye Sanremo	Mixed (Tarmac - Gravel)	2–5 October
5	(Canada) Rally of the Rideau Lakes	Gravel	16–20 October
6	(United States) Press-on-Regardless Rally	Gravel	30 October–3 November
7	(United Kingdom) RAC Rally	Gravel	16–20 November
8	(France) Tour de Corse	Tarmac	30 November–1 December

=== Cancelled rallies ===
Rally name	Surface	Dates
(Monaco) Rallye Monte Carlo	Mixed (Tarmac - Snow)	23-26 January
Rally Sweden	Snow	13-16 February
(Greece) Acropolis Rally	Gravel	17-20 July

== Manufacturers' championship ==
Points were awarded to the best placed vehicle of each manufacturer.

Position	1st	2nd	3rd	4th	5th	6th	7th	8th	9th	10th
Points	20	15	12	10	8	6	4	3	2	1

Pos.	Manufacturer	POR (Portugal)	KEN (Kenya)	FIN (Finland)	ITA (Italy)	CAN (Canada)	USA (United States)	GBR (United Kingdom)	FRA (France)	Points
1	(Italy) Lancia		3		1	1	4	3	1	94
2	(Italy) Fiat	1	10	3	2	Ret	2	12	6	69
3	(United States) Ford	9		1	EX	4	17	1		52
4	(Japan) Toyota	4				3	19	4		32
5	(France) Alpine-Renault	6			19	Ret	5		2	29
6	(Japan) Datsun	5	4	21		5	12	9		28
7	(Germany) Porsche	12	2		5	Ret	7	17		27
8	(Germany) Opel	19		8	3		20	5	7	27
9	(Sweden) Saab	Ret		4		18	14	2		25
10	(France) Renault				15		1	Ret	8	23
11	(Japan) Mitsubishi		1							20
12	(Sweden) Volvo	28		15		Ret	10	6		7
13	(Germany) BMW	7		13	EX	4	Ret	50		4
14	(France) Peugeot		7	45				74		4
15	(France) Citroën	8			Ret			69		3
16	(Italy) Alfa Romeo			17	Ret			60	10	1
Pos.	Manufacturer	POR (Portugal)	KEN (Kenya)	FIN (Finland)	ITA (Italy)	CAN (Canada)	USA (United States)	GBR (United Kingdom)	FRA (France)	Points

Key
Colour	Result
Gold	Winner
Silver	2nd place
Bronze	3rd place
Green	Points finish
Blue	Non-points finish
Blue	Non-classified finish (NC)
Purple	Did not finish (Ret)
Black	Excluded (EX)
Black	Disqualified (DSQ)
White	Did not start (DNS)
White	Cancelled (C)
Blank	Withdrew entry from the event (WD)

== Events ==
1974 World Rally Championship event map
Black = Tarmac	Brown = Gravel	Red = Mixed Surface

Colour	Rally Surface
Gold	Gravel
Silver	Tarmac
Blue	Snow/Ice
Bronze	Mixed Surface

Round	Rally name	Podium finishers				Statistics			
Round	Rally name	Rank	Driver	Car	Time	Stages	Length	Starters	Finishers
1	Rallye de Portugal (20–23 March) — Results and report	1	(Italy) Raffaele Pinto	Fiat Abarth 124 Rallye	6:26:15	32	454.00 km	120	36
1	Rallye de Portugal (20–23 March) — Results and report	2	(Italy) Alcide Paganelli	Fiat Abarth 124 Rallye	6:30:12	32	454.00 km	120	36
1	Rallye de Portugal (20–23 March) — Results and report	3	(Finland) Markku Alén	Fiat Abarth 124 Rallye	6:37:17	32	454.00 km	120	36
2	(Kenya) Safari Rally (11–15 April) — Results and report	1	(Kenya) Joginder Singh	Mitsubishi Lancer 1600 GSR	+ 11:18 pen	¿?	5200.00 km	99	16
2	(Kenya) Safari Rally (11–15 April) — Results and report	2	(Sweden) Björn Waldegård	Porsche 911	+ 11:46 pen	¿?	5200.00 km	99	16
2	(Kenya) Safari Rally (11–15 April) — Results and report	3	(Italy) Sandro Munari	Lancia Fulvia 1.6 Coupé HF	+ 12:22 pen	¿?	5200.00 km	99	16
3	(Finland) 1000 Lakes Rally (2–4 August) — Results and report	1	(Finland) Hannu Mikkola	Ford Escort RS1600	3:11:42	36	363.60 km	117	87
3	(Finland) 1000 Lakes Rally (2–4 August) — Results and report	2	(Finland) Timo Mäkinen	Ford Escort RS1600	3:12:13	36	363.60 km	117	87
3	(Finland) 1000 Lakes Rally (2–4 August) — Results and report	3	(Finland) Markku Alén	Fiat Abarth 124 Rallye	3:13:52	36	363.60 km	117	87
4	(Italy) Rally Sanremo (2–5 October) — Results and report	1	(Italy) Sandro Munari	Lancia Stratos HF	9:12:43	¿?	416.00 km	106	54
4	(Italy) Rally Sanremo (2–5 October) — Results and report	2	(Italy) Giulio Bisulli	Fiat Abarth 124 Rallye	9:20:30	¿?	416.00 km	106	54
4	(Italy) Rally Sanremo (2–5 October) — Results and report	3	(Italy) Alfredo Fagnola	Opel Ascona	9:56:09	¿?	416.00 km	106	54
5	(Canada) Rally Rideau Lakes (16–20 October) — Results and report	1	(Italy) Sandro Munari	Lancia Stratos HF	4:54:31	40	383.64 km	51	19
5	(Canada) Rally Rideau Lakes (16–20 October) — Results and report	2	(Finland) Simo Lampinen	Lancia Beta Coupé	4:56:49	40	383.64 km	51	19
5	(Canada) Rally Rideau Lakes (16–20 October) — Results and report	3	(Canada) Walter Boyce	Toyota Celica	5:07:45	40	383.64 km	51	19
6	(United States) Press-on-Regardless Rally (30 October–3 November) — Results and report	1	(France) Jean-Luc Thérier	Renault 17 Gordini	5:29:47	¿?	244.00 km	64	28
6	(United States) Press-on-Regardless Rally (30 October–3 November) — Results and report	2	(Finland) Markku Alén	Fiat Abarth 124 Rallye	5:35:49	¿?	244.00 km	64	28
6	(United States) Press-on-Regardless Rally (30 October–3 November) — Results and report	3	(France) Jean-Pierre Nicolas	Renault 17 Gordini	5:35:49	¿?	244.00 km	64	28
7	(United Kingdom) RAC Rally (16–20 November) — Results and report	1	(Finland) Timo Mäkinen	Ford Escort RS1600	8:02:39	84	¿? km	190	83
7	(United Kingdom) RAC Rally (16–20 November) — Results and report	2	(Sweden) Stig Blomqvist	Saab 96 V4	8:04:19	84	¿? km	190	83
7	(United Kingdom) RAC Rally (16–20 November) — Results and report	3	(Italy) Sandro Munari	Lancia Stratos HF	8:11:55	84	¿? km	190	83
8	(France) Tour de Corse (30 November–1 December) — Results and report	1	(France) Jean-Claude Andruet	Lancia Stratos HF	4:49:10	14	374.90 km	101	24
8	(France) Tour de Corse (30 November–1 December) — Results and report	2	(France) Jean-Pierre Nicolas	Alpine-Renault A110 1800	4:52:38	14	374.90 km	101	24
8	(France) Tour de Corse (30 November–1 December) — Results and report	3	(France) Jean-Luc Thérier	Alpine-Renault A310	5:12:09	14	374.90 km	101	24

== See also ==
- 1974 in sports
