= Press-on-Regardless Rally =

Road rally

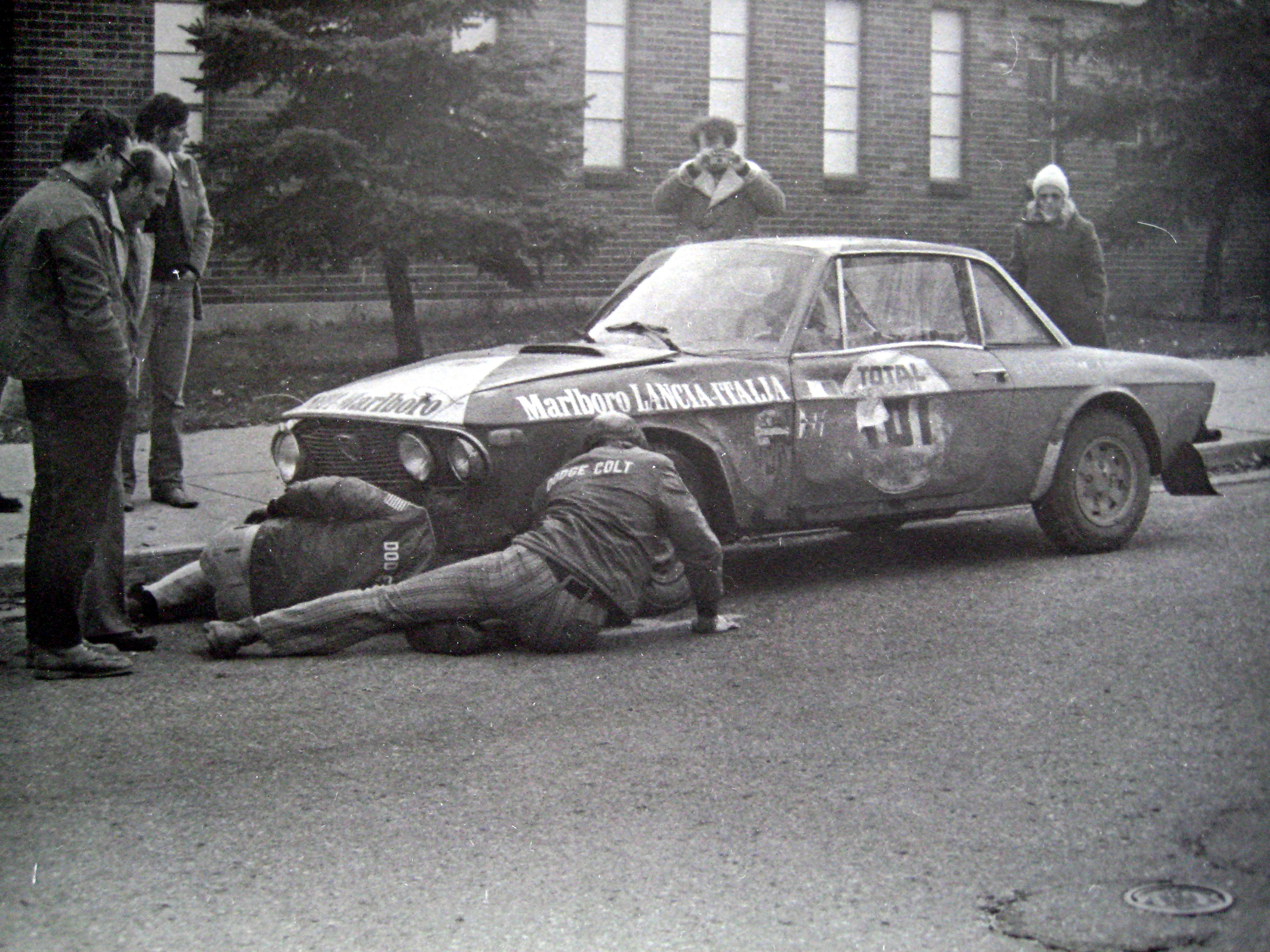
Harry Källström's Lancia Fulvia 1.6 Coupé HF during the 1972 rally.

Press On Regardless (POR) is a road rally organized by the Detroit Region of the Sports Car Club of America.

The Press On Regardless was first run in 1949 as a Time-Speed-Distance rally. In 1969, the POR became a stage rally. In 1972, the event was part of the International Championship for Manufacturers and then in 1973 and 1974 part of the World Rally Championship.

In 1994, the Detroit Region SCCA dropped out of the organization of the stage rally, and reorganized the Press On Regardless as a brisk TSD rally. The Lake Superior Performance Rally (LSPR) runs over many of the old POR roads in the Upper Peninsula of Michigan. LSPR is part of the American Rally Association schedule.

Press On Regardless is a registered trademark of the Sports Car Club of America.

== Winners ==
Year	Driver	Navigator	Car	Comment
1949	Vincent E. Gardner	Louise Gardner	1947 Studebaker Special 2 seater	
1950	Howard Preston	Mrs. Norm Couty	MG TC	
1951	Mr. Preston	Mrs. Preston	MG TC	No first names given
1952	Georgianna Apolant	Richard "Dick" Apolant	MG	
1953	Gib Hufstader	Frank Walker	1939 Buick Century	
1954	Ralph Durbin	Chuck Gleason	Oldsmobile	
1955	Ralph Durbin	Les Smith	Austin-Healey	
1956	Harry Beronius	Marg Beronius	VW	
1957	Harry Beronius	Marg Beronius	Porsche 356	
1958	Jim Bickham	Barbara Bickham	Mercedes 190 SL	
1959	Richard Doyen	Clay Gibbs	Chevrolet Corvette	
1960	Jim Bickham	Willard Whistler	Mercedes 190 SL	Tie
1960	Paul Stephens	Barbara Bickham	Sunbeam Alpine	Tie
1961	Dick Dittus	Bill Wells	Chevrolet Corvair	
1962	Bob Jackman	John Zabriskie	Chevrolet Corvair	
1963	Gene Henderson	Fred Browne	Chrysler	
1964	Jon Davis	Wayne Zitkus	Plymouth Valiant	
1965	Karl Goering	Don Skinner	Mercury Comet	
1966	Tom Samida	Ralph Beckman	Plymouth Barracuda	
1967	Gene Henderson	Wayne Zitkus	Ford Cortina	
1968	Karl Goering	Harry Ward	Plymouth Barracuda	M stage-Conners Flats
1969	Scott Harvey	Ralph Beckman	Sunbeam Arrow	1st year with stages
1970	Scott Harvey	Ralph Beckman	Sunbeam Arrow	1st year FIA
1971	Scott Harvey	Tom King	Plymouth Cricket	
1972	Gene Henderson	Ken Pogue	Jeep Wagoneer	1st year FIA Championship, 1st 4WD vehicle win in rallying
1973	Walter Boyce	Doug Woods	Toyota Corolla	WRC Round
1974	Jean-Luc Thérier	Christian Delferrier	Renault 17 Gordini	WRC Round
1975	Sobiesław Zasada	Wojciech Schramm	Porsche 911	Last year FIA
1976	Bob Hourihan	Steve Ruiz	Porsche 911	
1977	Hendrik Blok	Tom Grimshaw	Plymouth Arrow	
1978	John Buffum	Doug Shepherd	Triumph TR7	
1979	Taisto Heinonen	John Bellefleur	Toyota Celica	
1980	Rod Millen	Cam Warren	Mazda RX-7	
1981	Rod Millen	R.Dale Kraushaar	Mazda RX-7	
1982	John Buffum	Doug Shepherd	Audi Quattro	
1983	Hannu Mikkola	Fabrizia Pons	Audi Quattro	
1984	Rod Millen	R.Dale Kraushaar	Mazda RX-7	
1985	Rod Millen	John Bellefleur	Mazda RX-7	
1986	John Buffum	Tom Grimshaw	Audi Quattro	
1987	John Buffum	Tom Grimshaw	Audi Quattro	
1988	Paul Choiniere	Tom Grimshaw	Audi Quattro	
1989	Rod Millen	Harry Ward	Mazda 323	
1990	Paul Choiniere	Scott Weinheimer	Audi Quattro	
1991	Chad DiMarco	Eric Hauge	Subaru Legacy	
1992	Dick Corley	Lance Smith	Mitsubishi Eclipse	
1993	Carl Merrill	J. Jon Wickens	Ford Escort RS Cosworth	
1994	Scott Harvey	Ralph Beckman	1991 Eagle Talon	Returned to Endurance TSD
1995	Bill Laitenberger	John McArthur	1993 Subaru Legacy	
1996	Jim Fekete	Jim Shaffer	1995 Chevrolet S-10 Blazer	
1997	Mike Friedman	Marc Goldfarb	1990 Eagle Talon	
1998	Dan Coughnour	Greg Lester	1996 Jeep Cherokee	
1999	Mike Friedman	Marc Goldfarb	1990 Eagle Talon	
2000	Dave Parps	Rob Moran	2000 Subaru Outback	
2001	Ron Johnstonbaugh	Jack von Kaenel	1995 Mitsubishi Eclipse GSX	
2002	Ron Johnstonbaugh	Jack von Kaenel	1995 Mitsubishi Eclipse GSX	
2003	Ron Johnstonbaugh	Jack von Kaenel	2002 Subaru Impreza WRX	
2004	Scott Harvey, Jr.	Jim Fekete	1991 Eagle Talon	
2005	Ron Johnstonbaugh	Jack von Kaenel	2002 Subaru Impreza WRX	
2006	Dan Coughnour	Joe Andreini, Jr.	2002 Subaru Impreza WRX	
2007	Dave Harkcom	Dan Harkcom	1994 Audi S4	
2008	Scott Harvey, Jr.	Jack von Kaenel	1991 Eagle Talon	60th running of POR
2009	Dave Harkcom	Dan Harkcom	1994 Audi S4	60th anniversary of POR
2010	Ron Johnstonbaugh	Jack von Kaenel	2002 Subaru Impreza WRX	
2011	Scott Harvey, Jr.	Rob Moran	1991 Eagle Talon	
2012	Scott Harvey, Jr.	Rob Moran	1991 Eagle Talon	
2013	Edward Schowalter	Daniel Harkcom	2007 Subaru Impreza WRX	
2014	Edward Schowalter	Daniel Harkcom	2014 Subaru Impreza WRX	
2015	Ron Johnstonbaugh	Jack von Kaenel	1991 Audi 200 Quattro	
2016	Scott Harvey, Jr.	Rob Moran	2000 Audi A4	
2017	Dave Harkcom	Dan Harkcom	2005 Saab 9-2X	
2018	Scott Harvey, Jr.	Rob Moran	2000 Audi A4	70th running of POR
2019	Scott Harvey, Jr.	Rob Moran	2001 Audi A4	70th anniversary of POR
2020	Scott Harvey, Jr.	Rob Moran	2001 Audi A4	
2021	David Harkcom	Daniel Harkcom	2009 Saab 9-3	
2022	Ron Johnstonbaugh	Rob Moran	2015 Volkswagen GTI	
2023	L. Mark Stone	Marc Goldfarb	2011 Subaru Impreza 2.5i	
2024	Satish Gopalkrishnan	Savera D'Souza	2024 Audi Q3	75th anniversary of POR

| 2025 | L. Mark Stone | Marc Goldfarb | 2011 Subaru Impreza 2.5i
