= Daniel Carrara =

Argentine footballer (born 1982)

Personal information
- Full name: Daniel Alejandro Carrara
- Date of birth: December 30, 1982 (age 43)
- Place of birth: Córdoba, Argentina
- Height: 1.82 m (6 ft 0 in)
- Position: Midfielder

Youth career
- 2001–2004: Boca Juniors

Senior career*
Years	Team	Apps	(Gls)
2004–2006	FC Ascona	24	(6)
2006–2007	Chiasso	35	(1)
2007–2008	Massese	23	(1)
2008–2009	Lecco	21	(2)
2009–2010	Spezia	4	(0)
2010–2012	Chiasso	47	(6)
2012–2013	Locarno	24	(1)
- * Club domestic league appearances and goals

Daniel Alejandro Carrara (born 30 December 1982) is an Argentine footballer.

== Career ==
On 11 August 2009, after a trial period, he signs a contract with Spezia.
