= Carrera de cintas =

Traditional sport in Spanish-speaking countries

The carrera de cintas, or belt race, is a traditional sport often played during the patronal festival in Spain and Latin America. In the carrera de cintas, short belts with loops on one end are hung from a wire suspended between two posts. Contestants, who may be on either horses or bicycles, ride towards the wire and attempt to capture a belt by putting a peg through the loop. Traditionally, the belts are given to a group of women who then award prizes. Its origins can be traced back to medieval tournaments on horseback.
