= Carrara (disambiguation) =

Carrara is a city in Tuscany.

Carrara may also refer to:

- Carrara (surname)
- Carrara (singer)
- Carrara (software), a 3D modeling software package
- Carrara, Queensland
- Accademia Carrara, an art gallery
- Carrara Stadium
- Carrara marble, a type of white or blue-grey structural marble
- Carraresi or da Carrara
- Carrara, Nevada, a ghost town

== See also ==
- Carrara Glass, a trade name for vitreous marble
- Carrera (disambiguation)
