= Rally of the Rideau Lakes =

Rally of the Rideau Lakes was a rally competition held in Smiths Falls, Ontario, Canada. The rally originated from the Silver Lake Rally, a club rally started in the 1960s. Rally of the Rideau Lakes was first held in 1973, and it became part of the FIA World Rally Championship schedule for the 1974 season. The event was considered well-run and it influenced the Canadian Rally Championship, but due to financial problems it was never held again. However, the World Rally Championship returned to Canada in the 1977 season, when the Critérium du Quebec was included in the calendar.

The 1974 Rally of the Rideau Lakes was run from October 16–20, two weeks before the other North American WRC round, the Press-on-Regardless Rally in the United States. The rally consisted of 40 special stages on gravel roads. Of the 51 starting crews, 19 finished the event. Sandro Munari took the win with his Lancia Stratos HF, ahead of Simo Lampinen in a Lancia Beta Coupé. Home country's Walter Boyce placed third in a Toyota Celica.
