= Plymouth Cricket =

Plymouth Cricket may refer to two distinct badge-engineered automobiles marketed as the Plymouth Cricket:

- Plymouth Cricket, a rebadged variant of the British-built Hillman Avenger manufactured by the former Rootes division of Chrysler Europe and marketed in North America, for model years 1971-1973.
- Plymouth Cricket, a rebadged variant of the second generation Dodge Colt manufactured by Mitsubishi and marketed solely in Canada for model years 1973-1975.
