= Jeep Wagoneer =

Four-wheel-drive off-road SUV produced by Jeep

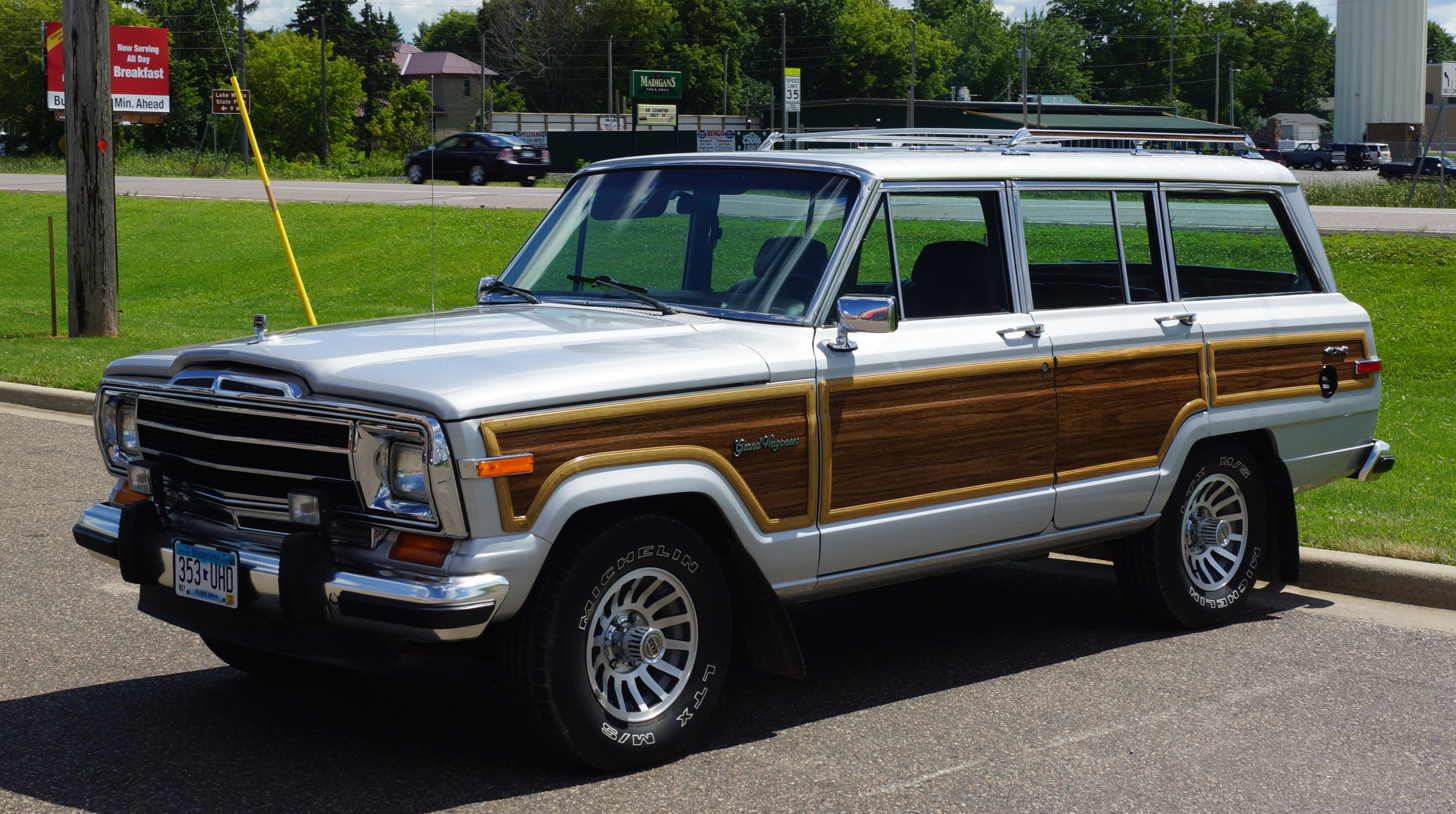
- 1990 Jeep Grand Wagoneer (SJ)

Overview
- Manufacturer: Jeep (Note: American Motors (1986–1988); Chrysler Corporation (1988–1998); DaimlerChrysler (1998–2007); Chrysler LLC (2007–2009); Chrysler Group LLC (2009–2014); FCA US LLC (2014–2021); Stellantis (2021–present))
- Also called: Jeep Grand Wagoneer
- Production: 1962–1993; 2021–present

Body and chassis
- Class: Full-size SUV (1963–1991; 2021–present); Compact SUV (1984–1990); Mid-size SUV (1993)
- Layout: Front-engine, rear-wheel-drive or four-wheel drive
- Chassis: Body-on-frame (SJ and WS); Unibody (XJ and ZJ, 1983–1994)

The Jeep Wagoneer and Grand Wagoneer are a sport utility vehicle (SUV) nameplate of Jeep vehicles, with several models marketed for the 1963 through 1993 model years and again since the 2022 model year.

Various versions of the Wagoneer/Grand Wagoneer were manufactured in the US and other nations by Kaiser Motors (1962−1971), by American Motors (1971−1987), by Chrysler (1987−1993), and Stellantis from 2021.

A revival of the Jeep Wagoneer was introduced as a concept version on September 3, 2020, and as the production model on March 11, 2021. Sales began in the second half of 2021 for the 2022 model year. In 2024, Jeep added an all-electric vehicle called the Wagoneer S to the lineup.

== First generation (SJ; 1963) ==
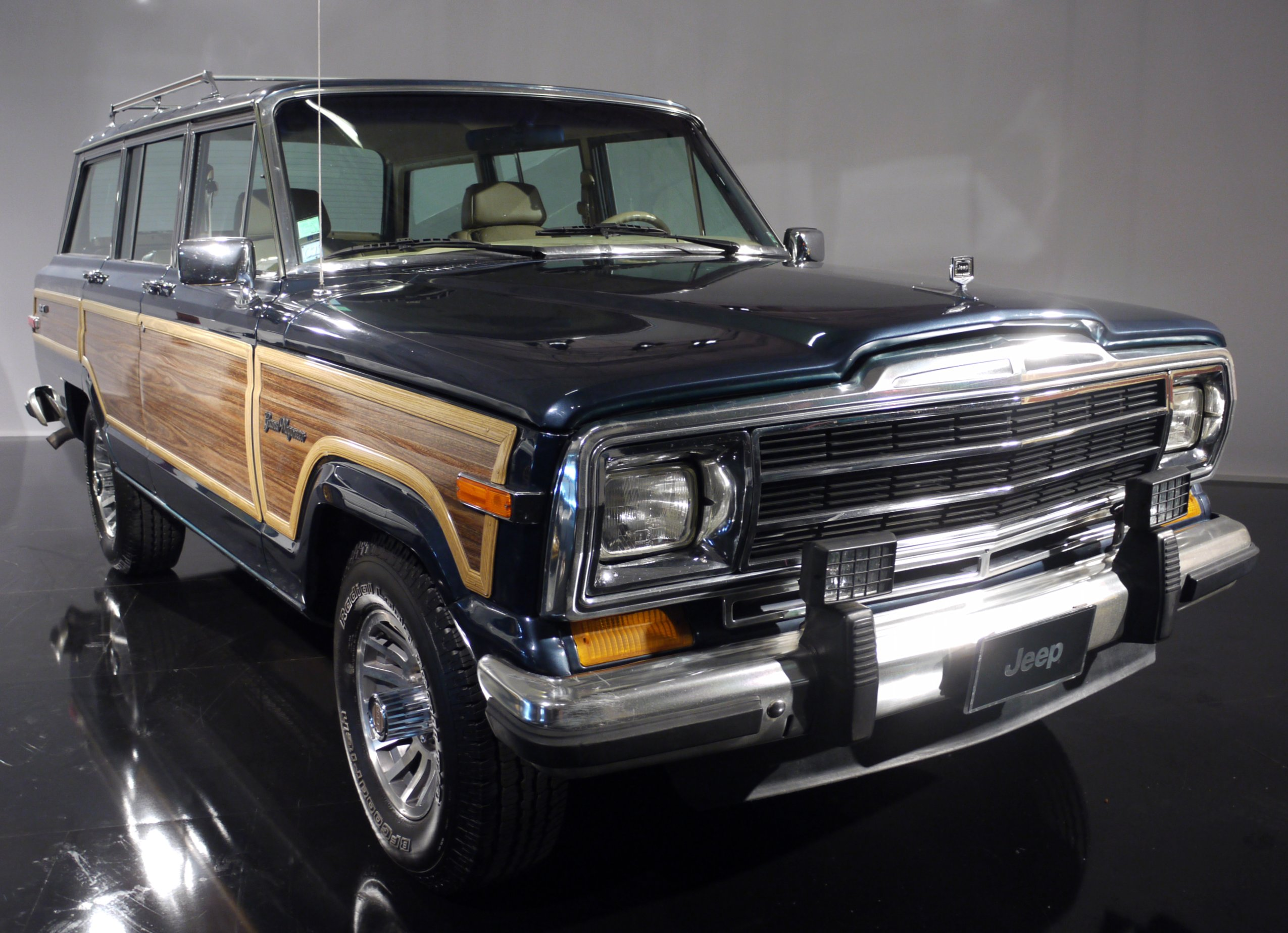
Jeep Grand Wagoneer (SJ)

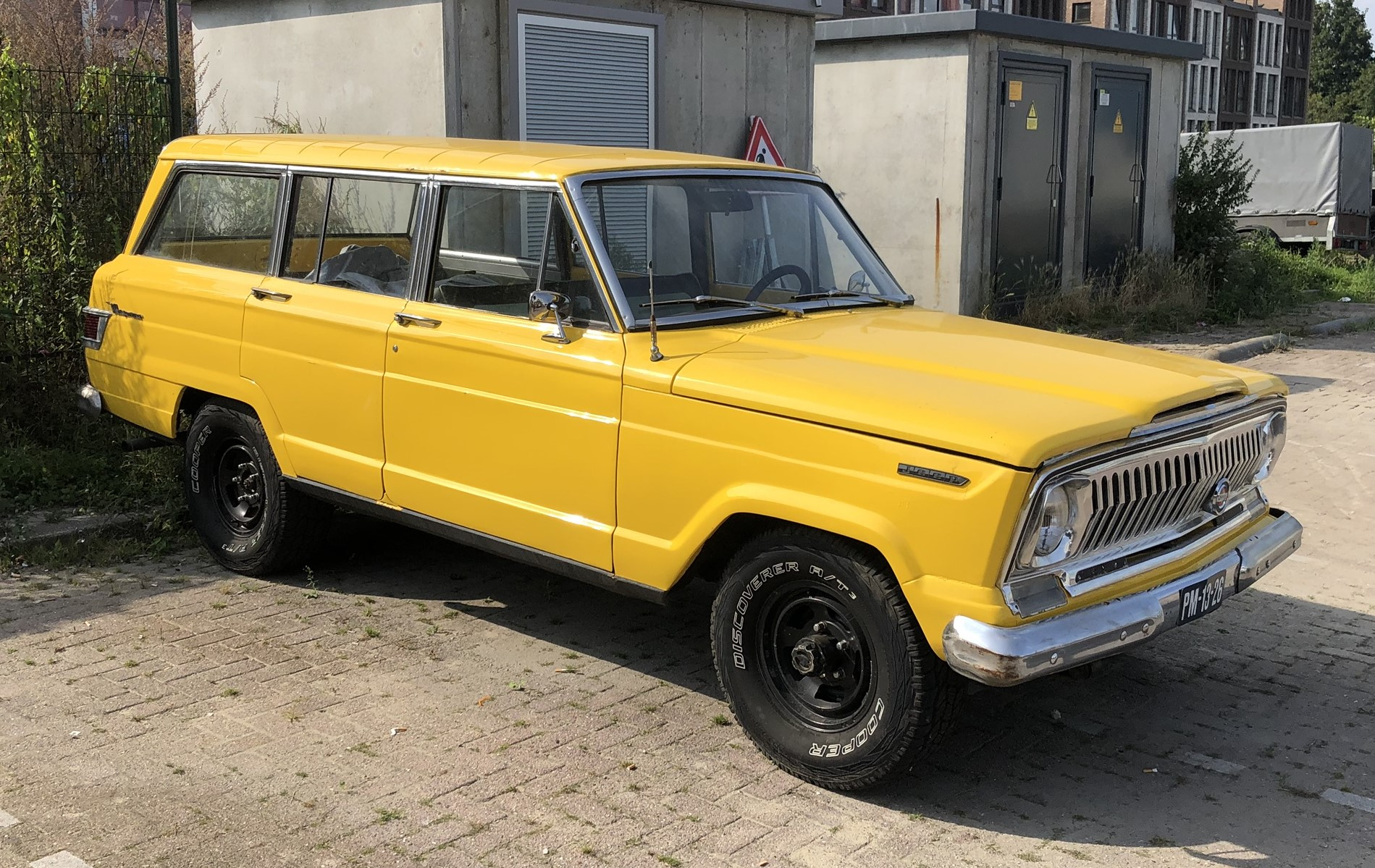
1968 Jeep Wagoneer

The first Wagoneer is the original full-size SUV-style design produced between 1962 and 1991. The new vehicle was introduced in November 1962 for the 1963 model year as a successor to the Willys Jeep Station Wagon that had been built since 1946. It is a full-size body-on-frame vehicle that shared its architecture with the Gladiator pickup truck. The vehicle was introduced as a station wagon body style, later the pioneering design became known as a "sport utility vehicle" (SUV).

Available initially with rear-wheel drive, the four-wheel drive SJ-body Wagoneer remained in production for 29 model years (1963–1991) with an almost unchanged body structure.

== Second generation (XJ; 1983) ==
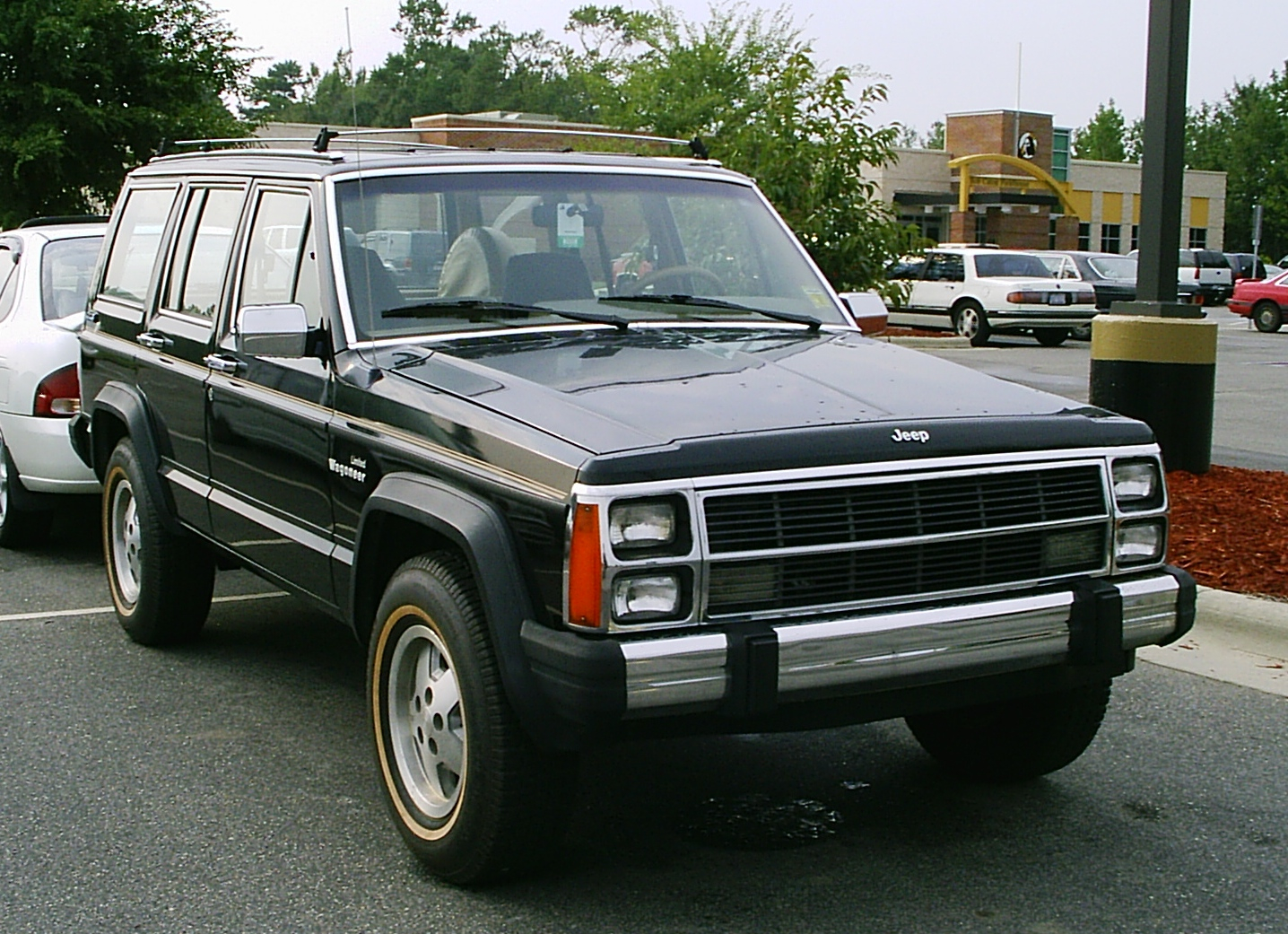
Jeep Wagoneer (XJ)

The second-generation Wagoneer is an upscale version of the unibody-based compact XJ Cherokee produced between 1983 and 1990. The compact XJ Wagoneer was available in two trim levels: the "Wagoneer" and the "Wagoneer Limited". These vehicles were intended to replace the SJ-body Wagoneer models, but high demand prompted American Motors and Chrysler after 1987 to keep the original SJ-body Wagoneer in production.

== Third generation (ZJ; 1993) ==
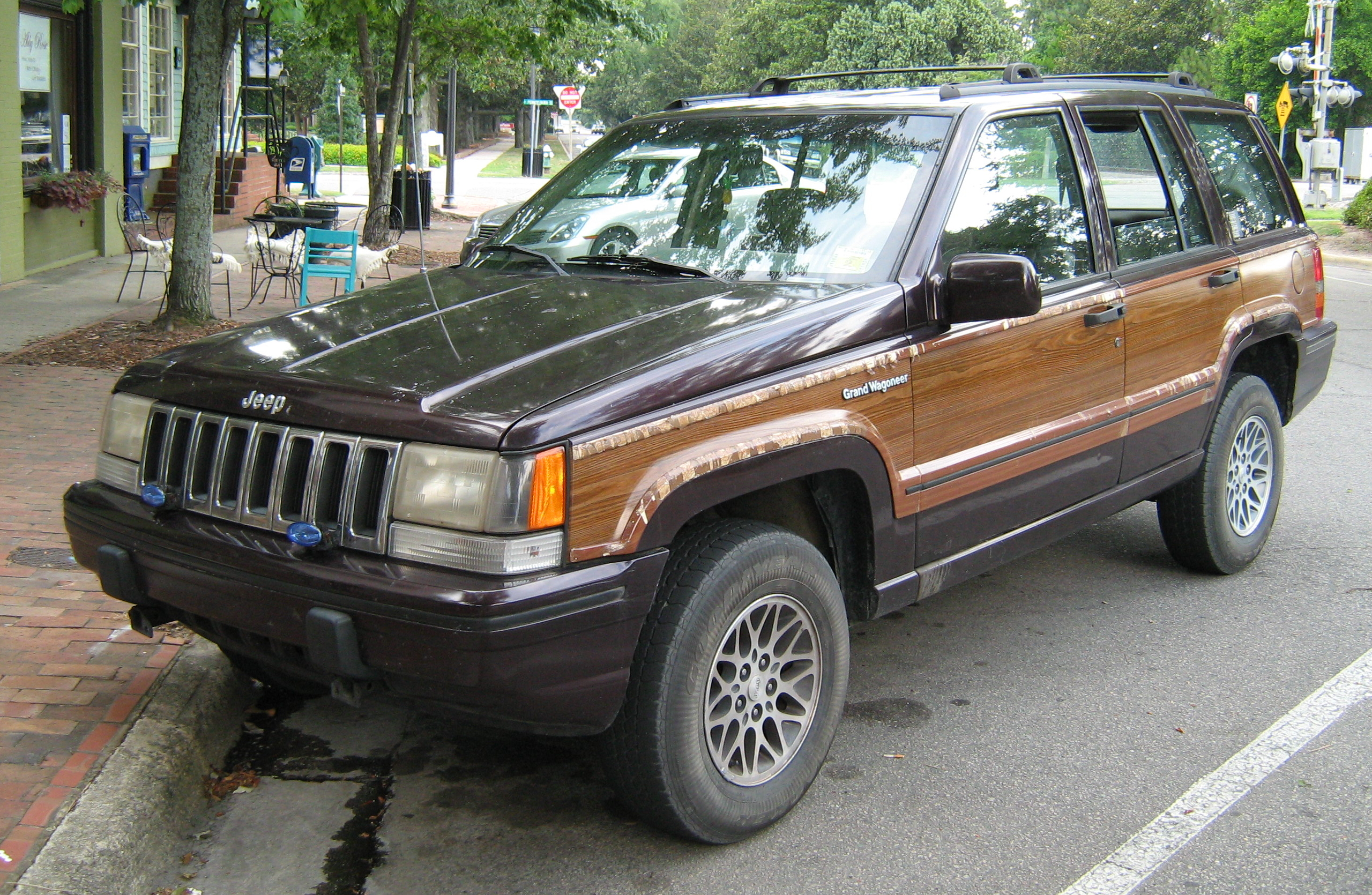
1993 Jeep Grand Wagoneer (ZJ)

The Wagoneer nameplate was reintroduced for one year as the top-of-the-line model of the Jeep ZJ platform that debuted on the mid-size Grand Cherokee for the 1993 model year. Called the Grand Wagoneer, it featured a long list of standard equipment, including the Magnum 5.2 L V8 engine and unique leather interior as well as the Grand Wagoneer's traditional exterior woodgrain applique. After 6,378 were produced, the model was dropped for 1994, leaving the Grand Cherokee Limited as the top-of-the-line Jeep.

== Fourth generation (WS; 2022) ==
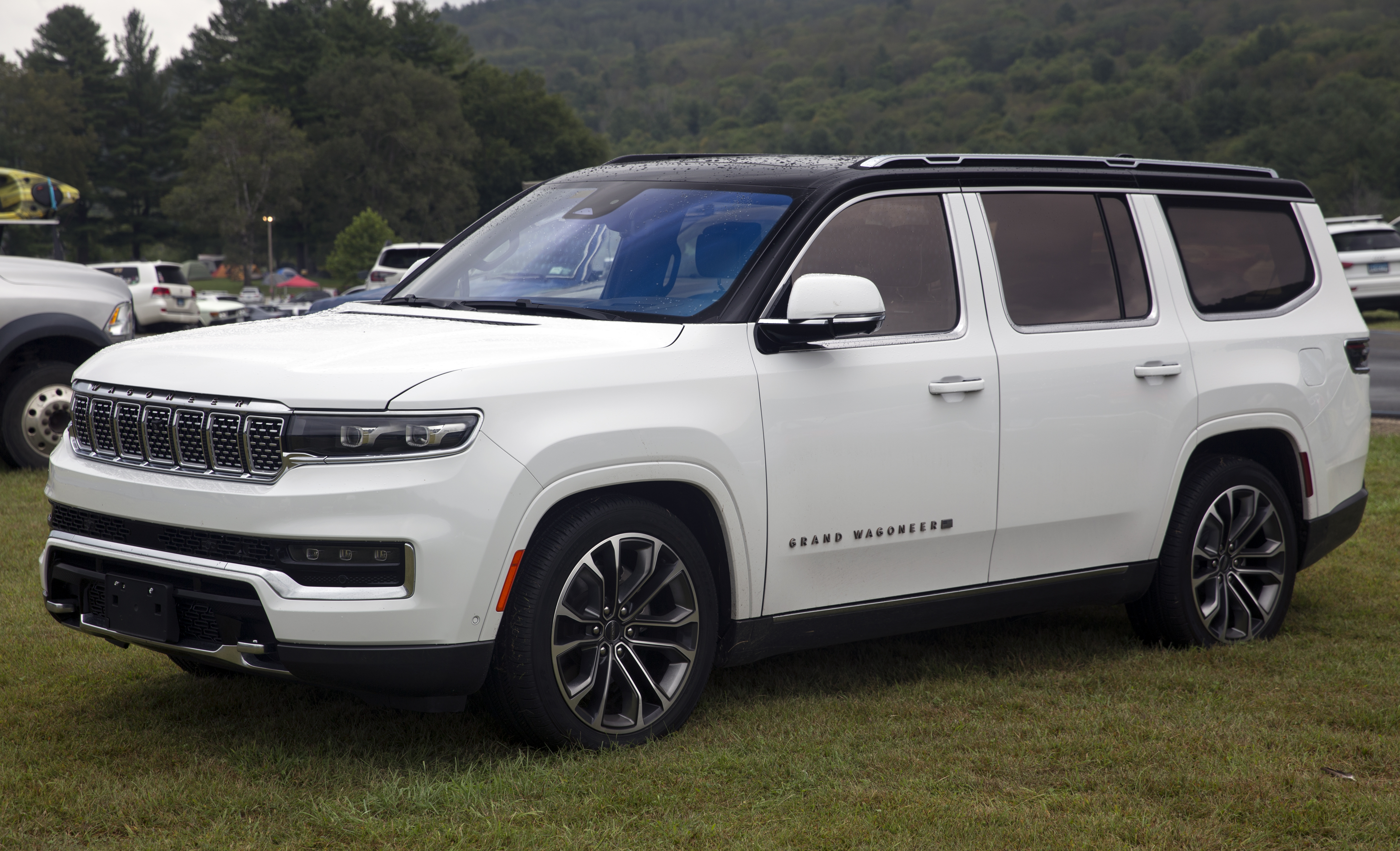
Jeep Grand Wagoneer (WS)

The fourth-generation Wagoneer and Grand Wagoneer are full-size SUVs and full-size luxury SUVs based on the Ram 1500 (DT) chassis. It was revealed in March 2021 for the 2022 model year as the flagship model of Jeep. Production of the fourth-generation Jeep Wagoneers began in 2021. The Wagoneer was merged into the Grand Wagoneer line for the 2026 model year.

== Wagoneer S (2024) ==
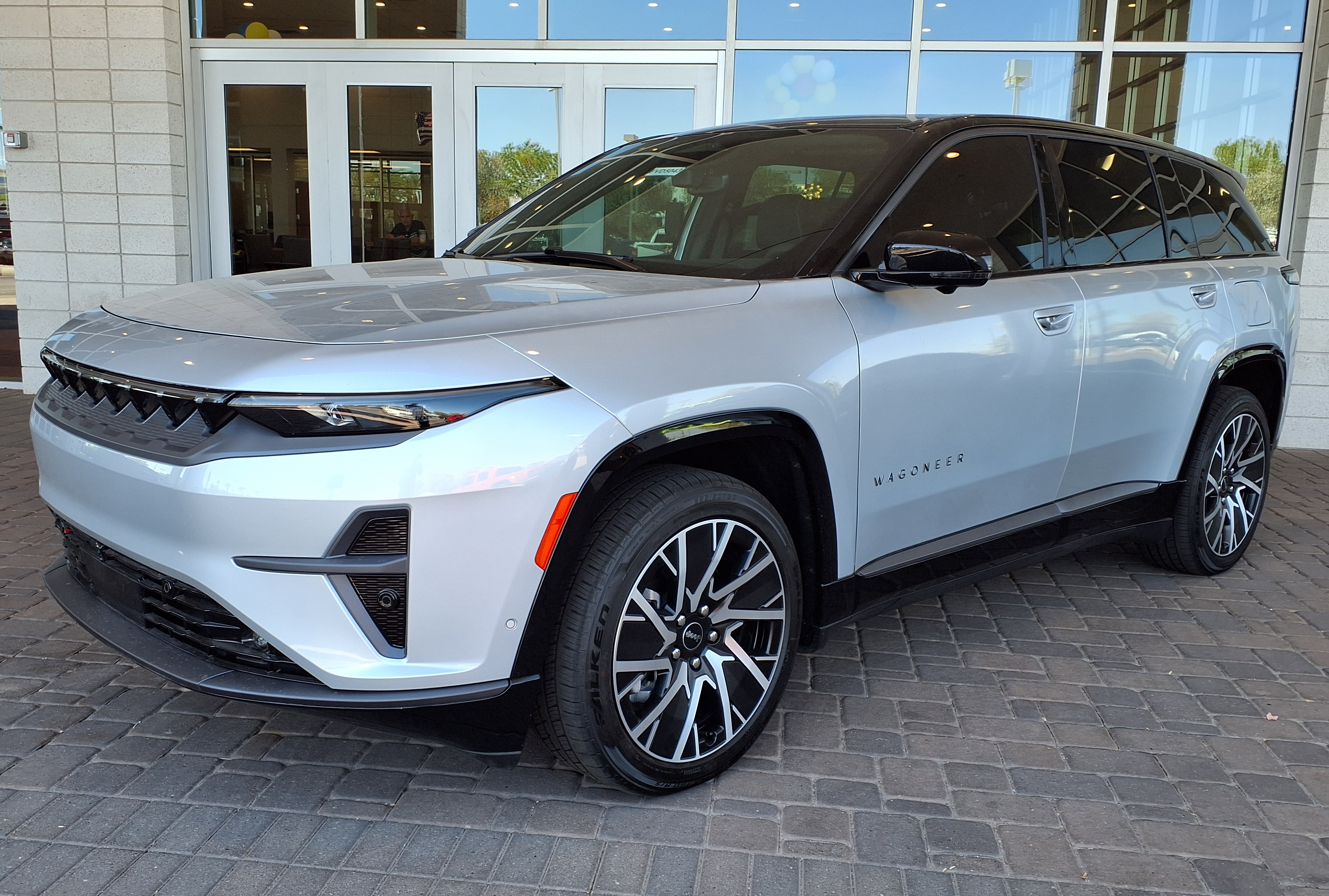
2025 Jeep Wagoneer S Limited

While the current Grand Wagoneer remains in production, an all-electric vehicle called the Wagoneer S was unveiled in 2024. It is a smaller vehicle than the Grand Wagoneer, as well as smaller in exterior dimensions than the current (2024) Jeep Grand Cherokee. The power output is 600 hp, coming from two electric motors, allowing it to accelerate from 0 to 60 mph in 3.4 seconds, which is faster than the Grand Cherokee Trackhawk. The gross battery capacity is slightly over 100 kWh. Multiple journalists made references to the Range Rover brand, either in a positive or a negative sense, when describing the vehicle.

Although first launched in North America, the Wagoneer S also went on sale in other markets, including Europe, according to the manufacturer.
