= Porsche Carrera =

Brand of Porsche automobile

Carrera (Spanish for "race" and "career") is a brand of Porsche automobile. The name commemorates the company's success in the Carrera Panamericana race.

Variants of the following vehicles have been called Carrera:

- Porsche 356
- Porsche 904
- Porsche 911
  - Porsche 911 (1963–1989)
  - Porsche 930 (1975–1989)
  - Porsche 964 (1989–1993)
  - Porsche 993 (1993–1998)
  - Porsche 996 (1998–2005)
  - Porsche 997 (2004–2013)
  - Porsche 991 (2011–2019)
  - Porsche 992 (2018–)
- Porsche 924 (1976-1988)
- Porsche Carrera GT

== In fiction ==
- Sally Carrera, a fictional character from Disney Pixar's Cars franchise, is based on the Porsche 996 Carrera.
