= Jog =

Jog or JOG may refer to:

- Jogging
- Jog (dislocations), a term in materials science, dislocation theory
- Jog (raga)
- Jog Falls, India's highest waterfall
- jog.fm, a music website
- Yogyakarta, Indonesia
  - Adisucipto International Airport in Yogyakarta, Indonesia, by IATA code
- Jewish Occupational Government conspiracy theory
- Jolt Online Gaming
- Junior Offshore Group, a British sailing yacht race organiser
- Lancaster John O'Gaunt Rowing Club
- Wii jOG, an accessory for the Wii gaming console
- Yamaha Jog, a scooter
- Jog, to move slowly through audio or video media on a media player by operating a jog dial

== People ==
- Anant Jog, Indian actor
- Chanda Jog (born 1954), Indian astrophysicist
- Gauri Jog (born 1970), Indian-American Indian classical dancer
- Kshitee Jog, Indian actress
- Ramchandra Shripad Jog (1901–1980), Indian writer
- V. G. Jog (1922–2004), Indian violinist
- Jog Meher Shrestha, Nepalese politician
- Jog Maharaj (1867–1920), Marathi kirtankar

== See also ==
- Joga (disambiguation)
- Yog (disambiguation)
- Yoga (disambiguation)
