= List of World Rally Championship co-drivers =

This is an incomplete list of co-drivers who have entered a World Rally Championship event. Active co-drivers (listed in bold in the tables) are those who have entered a WRC event within the past twelve months.

== All WRC co-drivers ==
| Co-driver | First season | Final season | WRC rallies | WRC wins | Championships |
|---|---|---|---|---|---|
| (Argentina) Marcelo Alvarez | 2000 | 2001 | 2 | - | - |
| (Norway) **Morten Erik Abrahamsen** | 2011 | **Active** | 10 | - | - |
| (Switzerland) Sara Aebi | 1998 | 1998 | 1 | - | - |
| (United Kingdom) Trevor Agnew | 1997 | 2005 | 27 | - | - |
| (Australia) John Ahem | 1999 | 1999 | 1 | - | - |
| (Germany) Rene Ahnert | 2005 | 2005 | 1 | - | - |
| (Finland) Atso Aho | 1973 | 1981 | 18 | 1 | - |
| (Finland) Jukka Aho | 1996 | 2004 | 21 | - | - |
| (Sweden) Ingemar Algerstedt | 1988 | 1996 | 9 | - | - |
| (Finland) Timo Alanne | 1993 | 2011 | 27 | - | - |
| (Italy) Alessandro Alessandrini | 1986 | 1997 | 14 | - | - |
| (Sweden) **Jonas Andersson** | 2002 | **Active** | 115 | 1 | - |
| (Italy) Anna Andreussi | 2001 | 2015 | 3 | - | - |
| (France) Jean-Marc Andrié | 1976 | 1999 | 32 | 2 | - |
| (Finland) **Miikka Anttila** | 1999 | **Active** | 167 | 15 | - |
| (Sweden) Joel Ardell | 2011 | 2011 | 4 | - | - |
| (Italy) **Nicola Arena** | 1997 | **Active** | 60 | - | - |
| (United Kingdom) Rob Arthur | 1981 | 1997 | 20 | - | - |
| (Peru) **Eduardo Aservi** | 2013 | **Active** | 2 | - | - |
| (Australia) Benjamin Atkinson | 2004 | 2009 | 4 | - | - |
| (United Kingdom) Andy Austwick | 1995 | 1995 | 1 | - | - |
| (Sweden) **Emil Axelsson** | 2005 | **Active** | 54 | - | - |
| (Lithuania) **Ramūnas Babachinas** | 2014 | **Active** | 1 | - | - |
| (Portugal) **Paulo Babo** | 1997 | **Active** | 7 | - | - |
| (Sweden) Lars Bäckman | 1979 | 2004 | 32 | 2 | - |
| (Greece) **Ekaterini Bante** | 2012 | **Active** | 3 | - | - |
| (Poland) Jaroslaw Baran | 1999 | 2007 | 19 | - | - |
| (Poland) **Maciej Baran** | 1998 | **Active** | 21 | - | - |
| (Italy) **Mara Bariani** | 1998 | **Active** | 2 | - | - |
| (France) Christian Baron | 1973 | 1985 | 8 | - | - |
| (United Kingdom) **Daniel Barritt** | 2000 | **Active** | 92 | - | - |
| (Germany) Jörg Bastuck | 2002 | 2006 | 4 | - | - |
| (Kenya) Chris Bates | 1973 | 1985 | 12 | - | - |
| (Poland) Grzegorz Bębenek | 2009 | 2009 | 1 | - | - |
| (Germany) Katrin Becker | 2006 | 2011 | 12 | - | - |
| (Australia) Scott Beckwith | 2006 | 2012 | 7 | - | - |
| (United Kingdom) Nicky Beech | 1990 | 2012 | 21 | - | - |
| (Canada) John Bellefleur | 1973 | 1988 | 12 | - | - |
| (West Germany) Jochen Berger | 1973 | 1976 | 14 | 1 | - |
| (Romania) Adrian Berghea | 2003 | 2004 | 6 | - | - |
| (Sweden) Bruno Berglund | 1975 | 1998 | 76 | 1 | - |
| (Italy) Arnaldo Bernacchini | 1973 | 1997 | 29 | 1 | - |
| (Italy) **Giovanni Bernacchini** | 1998 | **Active** | 102 | - | - |
| (Soviet Union) Tomas Bernsteyn | 1973 | 1973 | 1 | - | - |
| (Sweden) Claes Billstam | 1973 | 1991 | 77 | 2 | - |
| (Poland) **Bartlomiej Boba** | 2004 | **Active** | 5 | - | - |
| (Austria) Günther Böhs | 1973 | 1973 | 1 | - | - |
| (Norway) Kjetil Bolneset | 1987 | 1988 | 2 | - | - |
| (East Germany) Gunter Börk | 1973 | 1973 | 4 | - | - |
| (Romania) **Károly Borbély** | 2015 | **Active** | 1 | - | - |
| (South Africa) Franz Boshoff | 1987 | 1988 | 2 | - | - |
| (Luxembourg) Jos Brandenburger | 1973 | 1980 | 5 | - | - |
| (Italy) Bruno Brasci | 1993 | 1973 | 1 | - | - |
| (United States) Erik Brooks | 1973 | 1973 | 1 | - | - |
| (United Kingdom) Mark Broomfield | 1995 | 2001 | 5 | - | - |
| (United Kingdom) Jayson Brown | 1997 | 2002 | 8 | - | - |
| (Belgium) **Robin Buysmans** | 2010 | **Active** | 4 | - | - |
| (Argentina) **Diego Cagnotti** | 2005 | **Active** | 5 | - | - |
| (France) Marcel Callewaert | 1973 | 1973 | 3 | - | - |
| (France) Pierre Campana | 2008 | 2008 | 2 | - | - |
| (Argentina) Raul Campana | 1980 | 1990 | 10 | - | - |
| (Italy) **Giorgio Campesan** | 2011 | **Active** | 9 | - | - |
| (Argentina) Marcelo Carim | 1999 | 1999 | 1 | - | - |
| (Sweden) Per Carlsson | 1977 | 2003 | 45 | 2 | - |
| (Italy) Carlo Cassina | 1982 | 2008 | 30 | 1 | - |
| (Sweden) Björn Cederberg | 1973 | 1989 | 63 | 10 | 1984 |
| (France) Yves Célestin | 1973 | 1973 | 1 | - | - |
| (Czech Republic) Bohuslav Ceplecha | 2005 | 2010 | 12 | - | - |
| (Lithuania) **Mindaugas Čepulis** | 2014 | **Active** | 1 | - | - |
| (Ukraine) **Pavlo Cherepin** | 2011 | **Active** | 13 | - | - |
| (Belgium) Eddy Chevaillier | 1988 | 2012 | 31 | - | - |
| (France) Jean-Paul Chiaroni | 1983 | 2003 | 36 | 2 | - |
| (Argentina) Martin Christie | 1981 | 1999 | 76 | - | - |
| (Poland) Zbigniew Cieslar | 2003 | 2009 | 2 | - | - |
| (Poland) Ryszard Ciupka | 2006 | 2007 | 3 | - | - |
| (United Kingdom) **Marshall Clarke** | 2005 | **Active** | 10 | - | - |
| (United Kingdom) Alun Cook | 1989 | 2006 | 13 | - | - |
| (United Kingdom) Calvin Cooledge | 1994 | 2010 | 6 | - | - |
| (Romania) **Vlad Cosma** | 2015 | **Active** | 1 | - | - |
| (Kenya) Jim Cowper | 1973 | 1973 | 1 | - | - |
| (United Kingdom) Elizabeth Crellin | 1973 | 1974 | 3 | - | - |
| (United States) Sergio Cresto | 1980 | 1986 | 10 | 1 | - |
| (Spain) Lucas Cruz | 1998 | 2006 | 8 | - | - |
| (Poland) Jan Czyżyk | 1973 | 1977 | 4 | - | - |
| (Georgia (country)) Sergey Dadvani | 1985 | 1993 | 9 | - | - |
| (Argentina) Juan Damiani | 2001 | 2001 | 1 | - | - |
| (Italy) Roberto Dalpozzo | 1973 | 1983 | 10 | - | - |
| (Peru) **Ricardo Dasso** | 2015 | **Active** | 2 | - | - |
| (United Kingdom) John Davenport | 1973 | 1975 | 16 | 1 | - |
| (Belgium) **Andy de Baeremaeker** | 2014 | **Active** | 2 | - | - |
| (Poland) Filip Debowski | 2009 | 2009 | 1 | - | - |
| (France) **Thibault de la Haye** | 2012 | **Active** | 15 | - | - |
| (Belgium) **Bjorn Degandt** | 2008 | **Active** | 19 | - | - |
| (Spain) **Carlos del Barrio** | 1991 | **Active** | 78 | 1 | - |
| (Argentina) Jorge Del Buono | 1980 | 2004 | 86 | 1 | - |
| (Monaco) Freddy Delorme | 1979 | 2005 | 44 | - | - |
| (Belgium) Christian Delferrier | 1973 | 1981 | 27 | 3 | - |
| (Monaco) **Vanessa Dessi** | 1998 | **Active** | 11 | - | - |
| (Germany) Peter Diekmann | 1973 | 1996 | 73 | 1 | - |
| (Poland) Michał Dobrowolski | 2009 | 2009 | 1 | - | - |
| (Kenya) David Doig | 1973 | 1981 | 8 | 2 | - |
| (Turkey) Ilham Dökümcü | 1998 | 1998 | 10 | - | - |
| (Italy) **Mitia Dotta** | 1998 | **Active** | 30 | - | - |
| (Kenya) Mike Doughty | 1973 | 1987 | 20 | 4 | - |
| (Kenya) Lofty Drews | 1973 | 1990 | 18 | 1 | - |
| (France) **Thomas Dubois** | 2013 | **Active** | 2 | - | - |
| (Republic of Ireland) **Killian Duffy** | 2007 | **Active** | 25 | - | - |
| (United Kingdom) Robbie Durant | 2010 | 2012 | 8 | - | - |
| (France) **Guillaume Duval** | 2012 | **Active** | 4 | - | - |
| (Latvia) Peteris Dzirkals | 2008 | 2012 | 10 | - | - |
| (United Kingdom) Andrew Edwards | 2011 | 2012 | 4 | - | - |
| (United Kingdom) Paul Easter | 1973 | 1994 | 5 | - | - |
| (New Zealand) Michael Eggleton | 1984 | 1987 | 3 | - | - |
| (Norway) **Roger Eilertsen** | 2007 | **Active** | 4 | - | - |
| (Italy) Helmut Eisendle | 1973 | 1973 | 1 | - | - |
| (Monaco) **Daniel Elena** | 1999 | **Active** | 168 | 78 | 2004, 2005, 2006, 2007, 2008, 2009, 2010, 2011, 2012 |
| (Russia) Dmitriy Eremeev | 1999 | 2007 | 22 | - | - |
| (Czech Republic) **Michal Ernst** | 2005 | **Active** | 32 | - | - |
| (East Germany) Werner Ernst | 1973 | 1974 | 5 | - | - |
| (France) "Biche" | 1973 | 2013 | 23 | 2 | - |
| (Italy) Stefano Evangelisti | 1984 | 1994 | 10 | 1 | - |
| (Italy) **Danilo Fappani** | 1993 | **Active** | 34 | - | - |
| (Italy) Sauro Farnocchia | 1987 | 2002 | 23 | 1 | - |
| (France) Jean-Francois Fauchille | 1974 | 1994 | 43 | 2 | - |
| (Jamaica) Michael Fennell, Jr. | 2012 | 2012 | 1 | - | - |
| (Italy) **Michele Ferrara** | 2011 | **Active** | 8 | - | - |
| (France) **Sylvain Ferre** | 2015 | **Active** | 1 | - | - |
| (Norway) **Ola Fløene** | 1995 | **Active** | 76 | 1 | - |
| (United Kingdom) Les Forsbrook | 1994 | 2001 | 5 | - | - |
| (Portugal) Edgar Fortes | 1973 | 1986 | 5 | 1 | - |
| (Argentina) Gustavo Franchello | 2011 | 2011 | 1 | - | - |
| (United Kingdom) Roger Freeman | 1981 | 2002 | 33 | - | - |
| (New Zealand) Rodger Freeth | 1977 | 1993 | 24 | - | - |
| (New Zealand) Ken Fricker | 1983 | 1983 | 1 | - | - |
| (Argentina) **Edgardo Galindo** | 1997 | **Active** | 30 | - | - |
| (United Kingdom) Fred Gallagher | 1975 | 1999 | 69 | 5 | - |
| (Australia) Robert Gambino | 2002 | 2002 | 1 | - | - |
| (France) Michel Gamet | 1976 | 1978 | 2 | 2 | - |
| (Argentina) **Rubén García** | 1996 | **Active** | 65 | - | - |
| (Finland) Tero Gardemeister | 1993 | 2005 | 32 | - | - |
| (Kenya) Kim Gatende | 1973 | 1973 | 1 | - | - |
| (Argentina) Ernesto Gatti | 2002 | 2005 | 4 | - | - |
| (Austria) Jutta Gebert | 2002 | 2002 | 3 | - | - |
| (Germany) Tanja Geilhausen | 2002 | 2006 | 9 | - | - |
| (West Germany) Christian Geistdörfer | 1977 | 1989 | 61 | 13 | 1980, 1982 |
| (Italy) **Alex Gelsomino** | 2007 | **Active** | 24 | - | - |
| (Australia) Rhianon Gelsomino | 2008 | 2012 | 14 | - | - |
| (Australia) Steven Genovese | 2004 | 2004 | 1 | - | - |
| (Belgium) Elisabeth Genten | 1998 | 2002 | 2 | - | - |
| (Belgium) **Nicolas Gilsoul** | 2007 | **Active** | 70 | 1 | - |
| (France) **Denis Giraudet** | 1981 | **Active** | 174 | 5 | - |
| (United States) Peter Gladysz | 2006 | 2006 | 1 | - | - |
| (Republic of Ireland) **Kevin Glynn** | 2015 | **Active** | 1 | - | - |
| (Australia) Fred Gocentas | 1979 | 2008 | 18 | - | - |
| (Soviet Union) Sergey Gogunov | 1985 | 1992 | 4 | - | - |
| (Andorra) Jordi Gomà | 1995 | 1995 | 1 | - | - |
| (Venezuela) Ana Goñi | 1999 | 2006 | 31 | - | - |
| (Mexico) **Erick Gonzalez** | 2015 | **Active** | 1 | - | - |
| (France) **Fabrice Gordon** | 1994 | **Active** | 9 | - | - |
| (United Kingdom) Kevin Gormley | 1975 | 1999 | 47 | - | - |
| (Poland) **Szymon Gospodarczyk** | 2009 | **Active** | 5 | - | - |
| (Germany) Timo Gottschalk | 1999 | 2012 | 16 | - | - |
| (France) Daniel Grataloup | 1985 | 2002 | 87 | 4 | - |
| (United Kingdom) Ian Grindrod | 1977 | 1999 | 34 | - | - |
| (United Kingdom) Nicky Grist | 1985 | 2006 | 128 | 21 | 1993 |
| (Netherlands) Michel Groenewoud | 2005 | 2008 | 6 | - | - |
| (Switzerland) **Steve Groux** | 2013 | **Active** | 7 | - | - |
| (Austria) **Hannes Gründlinger** | 2015 | **Active** | 1 | - | - |
| (West Germany) Roland Gumpert | 1982 | 1982 | 1 | - | - |
| (Lebanon) **Marc Haddad** | 2017 | **Active** | 1 | - | - |
| (United Kingdom) Maurice Hamilton | 1999 | 2007 | 3 | - | - |
| (Finland) Seppo Harjanne | 1974 | 1997 | 128 | 20 | 1985, 1996, 1997 |
| (United Kingdom) **Allan Harryman** | 1998 | **Active** | 28 | - | - |
| (United Kingdom) Terry Harryman | 1974 | 1999 | 52 | 6 | - |
| (Kenya) Jim Heather-Hayes | 1974 | 1985 | 3 | - | - |
| (Kenya) Philip Hechle | 1973 | 1974 | 2 | - | - |
| (Poland) **Kamil Heller** | 2014 | **Active** | 1 | - | - |
| (Argentina) Claudio Henin | 1994 | 2001 | 4 | - | - |
| (Germany) **Karina Hepperle** | 2011 | **Active** | 11 | - | - |
| (Kenya) Edgar Herrmann | 1975 | 1983 | 3 | - | - |
| (Sweden) Arne Hertz | 1973 | 1999 | 133 | 18 | 1983 |
| (Germany) Manfred Hiemer | 1987 | 2004 | 68 | - | - |
| (Republic of Ireland) **John Higgins** | 2007 | **Active** | 5 | - | - |
| (United Kingdom) David Higson | 1973 | 1973 | 1 | - | - |
| (Netherlands) Ton Hillen | 1998 | 2010 | 3 | - | - |
| (Austria) Ferdi Hinterleitner | 1985 | 1989 | 8 | 1 | - |
| (Switzerland) Christophe Hofmann | 1991 | 2006 | 10 | - | - |
| (Sweden) Bosse Holmstrand | 2003 | 2010 | 5 | - | - |
| (Finland) Jakke Honkanen | 1989 | 2007 | 69 | - | - |
| (France) **Gaëtan Houssin** | 2008 | **Active** | 5 | - | - |
| (Czech Republic) Zdeněk Hrůza | 2006 | 2012 | 13 | - | - |
| (Czech Republic) Miloš Hůlka | 1997 | 2006 | 14 | - | - |
| (Netherlands) **Annemeike Hulzebos** | 2008 | **Active** | 12 | - | - |
| (United Kingdom) Konnie Huq | 2001 | 2001 | 1 | - | - |
| (Finland) Aarno Hurttia | 1973 | 1977 | 2 | - | - |
| (United Kingdom) Mark I'Anson | 1987 | 1988 | 2 | - | - |
| (Spain) Montserrat Imbers | 1973 | 1973 | 1 | - | - |
| (France) **Julien Ingrassia** | 2008 | **Active** | 113 | 39 | 2013, 2014, 2015, 2016 |
| (Mexico) **Ricardo Iniesta** | 2015 | **Active** | 1 | - | - |
| (Belgium) **Johan Jalet** | 2014 | **Active** | 1 | - | - |
| (Belgium) **Renaud Jamoul** | 2006 | **Active** | 28 | - | - |
| (Poland) Krzysztof Janik | 2009 | 2012 | 2 | - | - |
| (Estonia) **Ken Järveoja** | 2007 | **Active** | 16 | - | - |
| (Estonia) **Martin Järveoja** | 2010 | **Active** | 40 | - | - |
| (France) Jacques Jaubert | 1973 | 1981 | 14 | 2 | - |
| (France) **Carine Jaussaud** | 2014 | **Active** | 2 | - | - |
| (Poland) Lech Jaworowicz | 1973 | 1973 | 1 | - | - |
| (United Kingdom) Clive Jenkins | 1991 | 2008 | 28 | - | - |
| (Serbia) Aleksandar Jeremić | 2007 | 2008 | 10 | - | - |
| (Tanzania) Nizar Jivani | 1973 | 1978 | 6 | - | - |
| (France) Yves Jouanny | 1975 | 1977 | 4 | - | - |
| (South Africa) Douglas Judd | 1994 | 1998 | 3 | - | - |
| (New Zealand) Jeff Judd | 1987 | 2012 | 22 | - | - |
| (Finland) Harri Kaapro | 2002 | 2007 | 9 | - | - |
| (Ivory Coast) Angelberg Kady | 1988 | 1988 | 1 | - | - |
| (West Germany) Klaus Kaiser | 1978 | 1980 | 6 | - | - |
| (France) Juliette Keefer | 1973 | 1973 | 1 | - | - |
| (New Zealand) **John Kennard** | 1985 | **Active** | 71 | 1 | - |
| (Republic of Ireland) Rory Kennedy | 1987 | 2009 | 26 | - | - |
| (Austria) Sepp-Dieter Kernmayer | 1973 | 1973 | 4 | - | - |
| (Republic of Ireland) Paul Kiely | 2008 | 2009 | 3 | - | - |
| (United States) Alexander Kihurani | 2012 | 2012 | 1 | - | - |
| (Finland) Ilkka Kivimäki | 1973 | 1993 | 126 | 19 | 1978 |
| (France) **Nicolas Klinger** | 2003 | **Active** | 15 | - | - |
| (Ivory Coast) Clement Konan | 1982 | 1992 | 11 | - | - |
| (Ukraine) **Volodymyr Korsia** | 2013 | **Active** | 16 | - | - |
| (Poland) **Kamil Kozdron** | 2013 | **Active** | 3 | - | - |
| (Argentina) Juan Krackoviak | 2005 | 2005 | 1 | - | - |
| (Soviet Union) Ants Kulgevee | 1983 | 1987 | 3 | - | - |
| (Latvia) **Maris Kulšs** | 2014 | **Active** | 1 | - | - |
| (Poland) Malgorzata Kun | 2009 | 2009 | 1 | - | - |
| (Poland) **Lukasz Kurzeja** | 2003 | **Active** | 5 | - | - |
| (Finland) Pentti Kuukkala | 1977 | 1998 | 39 | - | - |
| (South Africa) Christo Kuun | 1973 | 1975 | 3 | - | - |
| (Estonia) Mait Laidvee | 2011 | 2011 | 3 | - | - |
| (Estonia) **Sergey Larens** | 2008 | **Active** | 15 | - | - |
| (France) Vincent Laverne | 1973 | 1984 | 19 | 1 | - |
| (France) Jean-Claude Lefèbvre | 1975 | 1978 | 3 | 1 | - |
| (Finland) **Jarmo Lehtinen** | 1997 | **Active** | 158 | 15 | - |
| (France) Jean-Jacques Lenne | 1976 | 1988 | 10 | 1 | - |
| (Switzerland) **Moira Lenzi** | 2015 | **Active** | 1 | - | - |
| (Canada) **Patrick Lévesque** | 2016 | **Active** | 2 | - | - |
| (Kenya) Anton Levitan | 1973 | 1990 | 13 | - | - |
| (United Kingdom) Huw Lewis | 1994 | 2007 | 12 | - | - |
| (France) Daniel Le Saux | 1979 | 1990 | 15 | 1 | - |
| (United Kingdom) Henry Liddon | 1973 | 1980 | 41 | 4 | - |
| (Germany) Jörn Limbach | 1996 | 2006 | 2 | - | - |
| (Finland) **Kaj Lindström** | 1996 | **Active** | 99 | 1 | - |
| (Australia) Joel Lithgo | 2001 | 2006 | 3 | - | - |
| (Australia) Damien Long | 1995 | 2000 | 7 | - | - |
| (Russia) Safoniy Lotko | 2008 | 2009 | 7 | - | - |
| (United Kingdom) **Stuart Loudon** | 2011 | **Active** | 17 | - | - |
| (Finland) **Mikko Lukka** | 2005 | **Active** | 11 | - | - |
| (Belgium) Willy Lux | 1978 | 1994 | 32 | - | - |
| (Italy) Gino Macaluso | 1973 | 1974 | 3 | - | - |
| (Poland) Tomasz Maciuszek | 2009 | 2009 | 1 | - | - |
| (Australia) **Glenn MacNeall** | 1993 | **Active** | 90 | - | - |
| (Portugal) **Hugo Magalhães** | 2012 | **Active** | 6 | - | - |
| (France) Alain Mahé | 1973 | 1987 | 38 | 7 | - |
| (France) **Michel Maiffret** | 2015 | **Active** | 1 | - | - |
| (Italy) Silvio Maiga | 1973 | 1979 | 14 | 4 | - |
| (Finland) Risto Mannisenmäki | 1982 | 2003 | 70 | 13 | 1998, 1999 |
| (Italy) Mauro Mannini | 1974 | 1979 | 7 | 1 | - |
| (Italy) Mario Mannucci | 1973 | 1980 | 14 | 3 | - |
| (Bulgaria) Rumen Manolov | 2003 | 2003 | 5 | - | - |
| (France) **Benoît Manzo** | 2017 | **Active** | 1 | - | - |
| (France) **Gwenola Marie** | 2006 | **Active** | 4 | - | - |
| (Finland) Jaakko Markkula | 1975 | 1991 | 14 | 1 | - |
| (Finland) **Mikko Markkula** | 2001 | **Active** | 57 | - | - |
| (Mexico) Javier Marin | 2001 | 2010 | 9 | - | - |
| (Spain) **Marc Martí** | 1992 | **Active** | 147 | 3 | - |
| (United Kingdom) **Scott Martin** | 2004 | **Active** | 86 | - | - |
| (New Zealand) Sara Mason | 2006 | 2012 | 7 | - | - |
| (United Kingdom) Tony Mason | 1973 | 1975 | 3 | - | - |
| (Lebanon) **Joseph Matar** | 2002 | **Active** | 26 | - | - |
| (Uganda) Moses Matovu | 2010 | 2010 | 2 | - | - |
| (Poland) **Przemysław Mazur** | 2014 | **Active** | 5 | - | - |
| (United Kingdom) Lee McKenzie | 2004 | 2004 | 1 | - | - |
| (Republic of Ireland) Ronan McNamee | 1985 | 1990 | 7 | 1 | - |
| (United Kingdom) John Meadows | 1983 | 1992 | 16 | 2 | - |
| (Slovakia) **Erik Melichárek** | 2012 | **Active** | 4 | - | - |
| (Norway) Cato Menkerud | 1993 | 2012 | 96 | - | - |
| (Hungary) **Márk Mesterházi** | 2014 | **Active** | 1 | - | - |
| (Italy) **Daniele Michi** | 2007 | **Active** | 5 | - | - |
| (Belgium) **Frédéric Miclotte** | 2005 | **Active** | 47 | - | - |
| (United Kingdom) Phil Mills | 1990 | 2010 | 162 | 13 | 2003 |
| (Austria) **Ilka Minor** | 1997 | **Active** | 112 | - | - |
| (Zimbabwe) John Mitchell | 1973 | 1989 | 5 | - | - |
| (Estonia) **Raigo Mõlder** | 2009 | **Active** | 13 | - | - |
| (United Kingdom) Claire Mole | 1997 | 2008 | 14 | - | - |
| (Sweden) Claes-Göran Molin | 1973 | 1973 | 1 | - | - |
| (United Kingdom) Peter Moon | 1974 | 1975 | 2 | - | - |
| (United Kingdom) Ellen Morgan | 1979 | 1989 | 14 | - | - |
| (Republic of Ireland) Ronan Morgan | 1982 | 1998 | 33 | - | - |
| (Republic of Ireland) **Michael Morrissey** | 1998 | **Active** | 23 | - | - |
| (Italy) Riccardo Mortara | 1973 | 1973 | 1 | - | - |
| (Australia) Jonathon Mortimer | 2000 | 2006 | 5 | - | - |
| (Australia) Dale Moscatt | 1999 | 2011 | 19 | - | - |
| (France) Michèle Mouton | 1973 | 1975 | 2 | - | - |
| (Spain) Luis Moya | 1988 | 2002 | 161 | 26 | 1990, 1992 |
| (Republic of Ireland) **David Moynihan** | 2005 | **Active** | 8 | - | |
| (Republic of Ireland) **Liam Moynihan** | 2015 | **Active** | 1 | - | - |
| (Austria) Peter Müller | 1996 | 2005 | 55 | - | - |
| (Argentina) **Fernando Mussano** | 2003 | **Active** | 26 | - | - |
| (Uruguay) Daniel Muzio | 1980 | 2001 | 37 | - | - |
| (Republic of Ireland) **Paul Nagle** | 2004 | **Active** | 66 | 4 | - |
| (Uganda) Frank Nekusa | 1994 | 2002 | 5 | - | - |
| (Ukraine) Kyrylo Nesvit | 2012 | 2012 | 6 | - | - |
| (Finland) Seppo Niittymäki | 1975 | 1975 | 3 | - | - |
| (United Kingdom) Thomas Nugent | 2009 | 2009 | 1 | - | - |
| (Poland) Andrzej Obrebowski | 2006 | 2012 | 10 | - | - |
| (Republic of Ireland) James O'Brien | 1988 | 2007 | 4 | - | - |
| (France) Bernard Occelli | 1983 | 1996 | 73 | 16 | 1994 |
| (Malaysia) Allen Oh | 1991 | 2004 | 30 | - | - |
| (Argentina) Martin Olhaberry | 1995 | 1995 | 1 | - | - |
| (United Kingdom) **Michael Orr** | 1993 | **Active** | 122 | - | - |
| (Estonia) **Andres Ots** | 2014 | **Active** | 1 | - | - |
| (United States) Terry Palmer | 1973 | 1974 | 3 | - | - |
| (France) **Xavier Panseri** | 2000 | **Active** | 11 | - | - |
| (France) Hervé Panizzi | 1990 | 2006 | 71 | 7 | - |
| (Greece) Andreas Papatriantafillou | 1973 | 1973 | 1 | - | - |
| (France) Claude Papin | 1984 | 1991 | 7 | 1 | - |
| (United Kingdom) Michael Park | 1994 | 2005 | 82 | 5 | - |
| (Sweden) Staffan Parmander | 1985 | 2012 | 95 | 5 | - |
| (United Kingdom) **Craig Parry** | 2002 | **Active** | 25 | - | - |
| (Italy) **Antonio Pascale** | 2013 | **Active** | 7 | - | - |
| (Austria) Jörg Patterman | 1977 | 1998 | 17 | 1 | - |
| (United Kingdom) **Chris Patterson** | 1993 | **Active** | 117 | - | - |
| (Brazil) Edu Paula | 2006 | 2012 | 25 | - | - |
| (Norway) Runar Pedersen | 1998 | 2000 | 5 | - | - |
| (South Africa) Stuart Pegg | 1976 | 1983 | 5 | 1 | - |
| (Spain) **Rogelio Peñate** | 2007 | **Active** | 22 | - | - |
| (Argentina) Jorge Perez Companc | 2001 | 2011 | 40 | - | - |
| (France) Michel Perin | 1979 | 2004 | 24 | - | - |
| (Italy) Maurizio Perissinot | 1976 | 1985 | 24 | - | - |
| (Finland) **Risto Pietiläinen** | 1993 | **Active** | 23 | 1 | - |
| (Finland) Juha Piironen | 1973 | 1993 | 83 | 14 | 1986, 1987, 1991, 1993 |
| (Italy) **Giovanni Pina** | 1993 | **Active** | 2 | - | - |
| (Italy) Luigi Pirollo | 1981 | 2005 | 57 | - | - |
| (France) Patrick Pivato | 1982 | 2008 | 26 | - | - |
| (Italy) **Mario Pizzuti** | 2014 | **Active** | 2 | - | - |
| (Morocco) Jean Plassard | 1973 | 1976 | 3 | - | - |
| (Poland) **Ireneusz Pleskot** | 2012 | **Active** | 2 | - | - |
| (Italy) Fabrizia Pons | 1979 | 1998 | 66 | 5 | - |
| (France) **Sébastien Porcher** | 2015 | **Active** | 1 | - | - |
| (United Kingdom) Jim Porter | 1973 | 1979 | 13 | - | - |
| (Belgium) **Stéphane Prévot** | 1989 | **Active** | 162 | - | - |
| (United Kingdom) Gemma Price | 2001 | 2009 | 36 | - | - |
| (Romania) **Dorin Pulpea** | 2004 | **Active** | 7 | - | - |
| (United Kingdom) Phil Pugh | 1997 | 2012 | 51 | - | - |
| (United Kingdom) **Kevin Rae** | 2014 | **Active** | 1 | - | - |
| (Finland) Timo Rautiainen | 1990 | 2010 | 144 | 30 | 2000, 2002 |
| (United Kingdom) Robert Reid | 1991 | 2003 | 103 | 10 | 2001 |
| (Finland) Juha Repo | 1982 | 2010 | 74 | 2 | - |
| (Switzerland) Stéphane Rey | 2011 | 2012 | 7 | - | - |
| (United Kingdom) David Richards | 1974 | 1999 | 26 | 4 | 1981 |
| (United Kingdom) Derek Ringer | 1987 | 2008 | 74 | 8 | 1995 |
| (United Kingdom) **Dai Roberts** | 2009 | **Active** | 3 | - | - |
| (United Kingdom) Gareth Roberts | 2006 | 2012 | 21 | - | - |
| (France) **Romain Roche** | 2010 | **Active** | 3 | - | - |
| (Portugal) **Nuno Rodrigues da Silva** | 1992 | **Active** | 45 | - | - |
| (Italy) Loris Roggia | 1982 | 2003 | 45 | - | - |
| (Argentina) Atilio Rolandi | 1994 | 2003 | 2 | - | - |
| (Belgium) **Morgane Rose** | 2014 | **Active** | 2 | - | - |
| (Italy) Francesco Rossetti | 1973 | 1982 | 17 | 1 | - |
| (United Kingdom) **Andrew Roughead** | 2007 | **Active** | 4 | - | - |
| (France) **David Rouhaud** | 2016 | **Active** | 2 | - | - |
| (Spain) **Borja Rozada** | 2007 | **Active** | 36 | - | - |
| (Germany) Detlef Ruf | 1996 | 2012 | 12 | - | - |
| (Italy) Ninni Russo | 1973 | 1977 | 25 | - | - |
| (Poland) Antoni Ryniak | 1973 | 1973 | 1 | - | - |
| (Finland) **Marko Salminen** | 2008 | **Active** | 7 | - | - |
| (Estonia) Marek Sarapuu | 2009 | 2011 | 3 | - | - |
| (France) **Dominique Savignoni** | 1990 | **Active** | 14 | - | - |
| (Italy) Bruno Scabini | 1973 | 1986 | 13 | - | - |
| (Germany) **Andreas Schwalié** | 2000 | **Active** | 6 | - | - |
| (Poland) Jacek Scicinski | 1995 | 1998 | 2 | - | - |
| (United Kingdom) David Senior | 1986 | 2009 | 115 | - | - |
| (Argentina) Oscar Seppey | 1997 | 1999 | 2 | - | - |
| (Italy) Massimo Sghedoni | 1978 | 1998 | 10 | - | - |
| (Estonia) **Kuldar Sikk** | 2003 | **Active** | 90 | - | - |
| (Finland) Voitto Silander | 1978 | 2002 | 55 | - | - |
| (Latvia) Andris Šimkus | 1987 | 1998 | 5 | - | - |
| (New Zealand) Tony Sircombe | 1982 | 2007 | 86 | - | - |
| (United Kingdom) Michael Siveyer | 1973 | 1973 | 1 | - | - |
| (Italy) Tiziano Siviero | 1980 | 2001 | 78 | 16 | 1988, 1989 |
| (Belgium) Sven Smeets | 1995 | 2005 | 94 | 1 | - |
| (France) **Dimitri Smid** | 2015 | **Active** | 1 | - | - |
| (United States) Carol Smiskol | 1973 | 1974 | 3 | - | - |
| (Australia) Tom Smith | 1993 | 2001 | 2 | - | - |
| (Belgium) Rik Snaet | 2000 | 2003 | 2 | - | - |
| (Italy) Piero Sodano | 1973 | 1981 | 21 | - | - |
| (Sweden) Erik Spjuth | 1982 | 1982 | 1 | - | - |
| (Sweden) Ragnar Spjuth | 1977 | 2005 | 38 | - | - |
| (Australia) Mark Stacey | 1992 | 2009 | 21 | - | - |
| (Belgium) Etienne Stalpeart | 1973 | 1973 | 1 | - | - |
| (Australia) Iain Stewart | 1989 | 2004 | 24 | - | - |
| (Argentina) Nestor Straimel | 1980 | 1984 | 6 | - | - |
| (Australia) Monty Suffern | 1980 | 1980 | 1 | - | - |
| (Thailand) Visut Sukosi | 1996 | 2010 | 3 | - | - |
| (Sweden) **Marcus Sundh** | 2014 | **Active** | 1 | - | - |
| (Finland) **Tapio Suominen** | 2005 | **Active** | 6 | - | - |
| (Socialist Federal Republic of Yugoslavia) Sasa Svarcer | 1973 | 1973 | 1 | - | - |
| (United Kingdom) Johnstone Syer | 1973 | 1981 | 17 | - | - |
| (Sweden) Hans Sylvan | 1974 | 2011 | 26 | 1 | - |
| (Poland) **Maciej Szczepaniak** | 1999 | **Active** | 78 | - | - |
| (Australia) **Coral Taylor** | 1993 | **Active** | 11 | - | - |
| (Italy) Luciano Tedeschini | 1979 | 1996 | 14 | - | - |
| (France) Jacques Terramorsi | 1973 | 1981 | 4 | - | - |
| (Argentina) Dario Teti | 1999 | 1999 | 1 | - | - |
| (Kenya) Surinder Thatthi | 1984 | 1999 | 10 | - | - |
| (Belgium) Davy Thierie | 2011 | 2011 | 2 | - | - |
| (France) Gilles Thimonier | 1983 | 2010 | 40 | 1 | - |
| (France) Pierre Thimonier | 1973 | 1988 | 28 | 1 | - |
| (Kenya) Quentin Thomson | 1977 | 1987 | 6 | - | - |
| (Sweden) Tina Thörner | 1985 | 2002 | 76 | - | - |
| (Sweden) Bo Thorszelius | 1980 | 1986 | 6 | - | - |
| (Sweden) Hans Thorszelius | 1973 | 1986 | 72 | 13 | 1979 |
| (Finland) Martti Tiukkanen | 1973 | 1977 | 4 | 1 | - |
| (United Kingdom) **Peta Todd** | 2014 | **Active** | 1 | - | - |
| (France) Jean Todt | 1973 | 1981 | 54 | 4 | - |
| (Czech Republic) **Jan Tománek** | 2001 | **Active** | 89 | - | - |
| (Argentina) Gustavo Topalian | 1998 | 2001 | 3 | - | - |
| (Russia) **Maxim Tsvetkov** | 2007 | **Active** | 8 | - | - |
| (United Kingdom) Derek Tucker | 1975 | 1982 | 6 | - | - |
| (Finland) **Tomi Tuominen** | 1999 | **Active** | 26 | - | - |
| (Monaco) Auguste Turiani | 1973 | 1973 | 1 | - | - |
| (United Kingdom) Robin Turvey | 1973 | 1974 | 2 | - | - |
| (United Kingdom) Max Utting | 2004 | 2009 | 5 | - | - |
| (Soviet Union) Georg Valdek | 1979 | 1989 | 4 | - | - |
| (Spain) Diego Vallejo | 1993 | 2012 | 32 | - | - |
| (Australia) Steve Vanderbyl | 1996 | 1998 | 3 | - | - |
| (Belgium) **Lara Vanneste** | 2011 | **Active** | 8 | - | - |
| (Portugal) José Varela | 1973 | 1973 | 1 | - | - |
| (France) Michel Vial | 1973 | 1984 | 45 | 2 | - |
| (Finland) Petri Vihavainen | 1990 | 2002 | 19 | - | - |
| (New Zealand) Graig Vincent | 1987 | 2001 | 14 | - | - |
| (Russia) Anton Vlasyuk | 2011 | 2011 | 4 | - | - |
| (Sweden) Miriam Walfridsson | 2008 | 2012 | 5 | - | - |
| (United States) Harry Ward III | 1986 | 1988 | 3 | - | - |
| (Japan) Shunichi Washio | 1987 | 2002 | 10 | - | - |
| (Poland) Lukasz Wawrzynczyk | 2009 | 2009 | 1 | - | - |
| (Austria) Wolfgang Weiss | 1973 | 1973 | 2 | - | - |
| (United Kingdom) Paul White | 1973 | 1985 | 9 | 1 | - |
| (United Kingdom) Dave Whittock | 1975 | 1989 | 26 | - | - |
| (Germany) **Klaus Wicha** | 1989 | **Active** | 84 | - | - |
| (United Kingdom) **Amy Williams** | 2013 | **Active** | 1 | - | - |
| (United Kingdom) **Carl Williamson** | 2002 | **Active** | 21 | - | - |
| (Kenya) David Williamson | 1984 | 1999 | 12 | 1 | - |
| (United Kingdom) Neil Wilson | 1973 | 2000 | 23 | 1 | - |
| (Austria) **Gerald Winter** | 2014 | **Active** | 1 | - | - |
| (Poland) Maciej Wislawski | 1996 | 2009 | 8 | - | - |
| (United Kingdom) Mike Wood | 1973 | 1984 | 14 | - | - |
| (Canada) Doug Woods | 1973 | 1974 | 3 | 1 | - |
| (Switzerland) Michel Wyder | 1980 | 1983 | 4 | - | - |
| (Bulgaria) Yanaki Yanakiev | 2003 | 2010 | 6 | - | - |
| (Bulgaria) Petar Yordanov | 2010 | 2010 | 1 | - | - |
| (Poland) **Przemek Zawada** | 2014 | **Active** | 1 | - | - |
| (Austria) Franz Zehetner | 1984 | 1986 | 3 | - | - |
| (Hungary) Gábor Zsíros | 2010 | 2011 | 10 | - | - |
| (Lithuania) **Donatas Zvicevičius** | 2017 | **Active** | 1 | - | - |
| (Netherlands) Harry Zwiers | 1973 | 1973 | 1 | - | - |
| (Poland) Ryszard Żyszkowski | 1973 | 1988 | 20 | - | - |
