= Yogi (disambiguation) =

A yogi is an advanced practitioner of yoga in Eastern religions.

Yogi may also refer to:

== People ==
- Yogi Adityanath (born 1972), Chief Minister of the Indian state of Uttar Pradesh
- Yogi Babu (born 1985), Indian actor and comedian
- Yogi Berra (1925–2015), Major League Baseball player, manager, and coach in the American Hall of Fame
- Yogi Ferrell (born 1993), American basketball player
- John Hughes (footballer, born 1943), Scottish footballer
- John Hughes (footballer, born 1964), Scottish footballer
- Yogi Huyghebaert (1944–2018), Canadian politician
- Yogi Roth (born 1981), American college football player and coach, broadcaster, and filmmaker
- Ian Stannard (born 1987), British racing cyclist
- Michael Stewart (basketball) (born 1975), American retired National Basketball Association player
- Jaroslav Svejkovský (born 1976), Czech retired hockey player
- Yogi Triana (born 1994), Indonesian football goalkeeper
- Maharishi Mahesh Yogi (1918–2008), developer of the Transcendental Meditation technique; guru to the Beatles and other celebrities
- MC Yogi (born 1979), American rapper
- Yogie (born 1973), Indian director
- Yogesh (actor) (born 1990), actor in Kannada films sometimes billed as Yogi

== Arts and entertainment ==
- Yogi Bear, a Hanna-Barbera cartoon character
- Yogi Yorgesson, a character played by Harry Stewart (1908–1956), Norwegian-American entertainer
- The Yogi, a 1916 German silent film
- Yogi (2007 film), an Indian Telugu-language film starring Prabhas and Nayanthara, directed by V.V. Vinayak
- Yogi (2009 Tamil film), an Indian Tamil-language film starring Ameer Sultan and Madhumitha, directed by Subramaniam Siva
  - Yogi (soundtrack), its soundtrack by Yuvan Shankar Raja
- Yogi (2009 Kannada film), an Indian Kannada-language film starring Yogesh
- "Yogi", a 1960 single by The Ivy Three

== Other uses ==
- Yogi Rock, a rock on the planet Mars, named after Yogi Bear
- Yogi Tea, a manufacturer of tea products
- Aerodyne Yogi, a French paraglider design
- Yogi (superyacht) was a motoryacht completed in 2011 that sunk in 2012
- Camponotus yogi, a species of carpenter ant

== See also ==
- Jogi (disambiguation)
- Yog (disambiguation)
- Yoga (disambiguation)
- Yoginder (disambiguation)
