= 1974 Safari Rally =

1974 Safari Rally 22nd East African Safari Rally
Round 2 of the 1974 World Rally Championship season
← Previous event	Next event →
- Host country: Kenya
- Rally base: Nairobi, Kenya
- Dates run: 11 April – 15 April 1974
- Stage surface: Gravel
- Overall distance: 5,000 km (3,100 miles) (approx.)

Statistics
- Crews: 99 at start, 16 at finish

Overall results
- Overall winner: (Kenya) Joginder Singh (Kenya) David Doig (Japan) Mitsubishi Ralliart

The 1974 Safari Rally (formally the 22nd East African Safari Rally) was the second round of the shortened 1974 World Rally Championship season. It took place between 11 and 15 April 1974. The Safari Rally didn't use special stages at this time to decide a winner. Instead all of the route was competitive - with the driver with the lowest accumulation of penalty time between time controls being declared the winner.

== Rally Racing Teams ==
Racing Team	Driver	Co-driver	#	Car
1974 Safari Rally racing teams
(Italy) Lancia Marlboro	(Kenya) Shekhar Mehta	(Kenya) Mike Doughty	7	(Italy) Lancia Fulvia 1.6 Coupé HF
(Italy) Lancia Marlboro	(Italy) Sandro Munari	(Kenya) Lofty Drews	10	(Italy) Lancia Fulvia 1.6 Coupé HF
(United Kingdom) Chipsteads of Kensington	(Sweden) Björn Waldegård	(Sweden) Hans Thorszelius	19	(Germany) Porsche 911 Carrera RS
(United Kingdom) Chipsteads of Kensington	(United Kingdom) William A. Fritschy	(United Kingdom) Peter Moon	36	(Germany) Porsche 911 S
(Kenya) African Roadways (NBO)	(Finland) Rauno Aaltonen	(Germany) Wolfgang Stiller	16	(Japan) Datsun 1800 SSS
(Kenya) Marshalls (EA) Ltd.	(Finland) Hannu Mikkola	(France) Jean Todt	1	(France) Peugeot 504
(Kenya) Marshalls (EA) Ltd.	(Sweden) Ove Andersson	(Sweden) Arne Hertz	4	(France) Peugeot 504
(Kenya) Marshalls (EA) Ltd.	(Finland) Timo Mäkinen	(United Kingdom) John Davenport	5	(France) Peugeot 504
(Kenya) Marshalls (EA) Ltd.	(United Kingdom) Tony Fall	(United Kingdom) Mike Wood	6	(France) Peugeot 504
(Kenya) Marshalls (EA) Ltd.	(Germany) Peter Huth	(Kenya) Philip Rea Hechle	21	(France) Peugeot 504
(Kenya) Marshalls (EA) Ltd.	(Tanzania) Bert Shankland	(Kenya) Christopher Edward Bates	50	(France) Peugeot 504

== Report ==
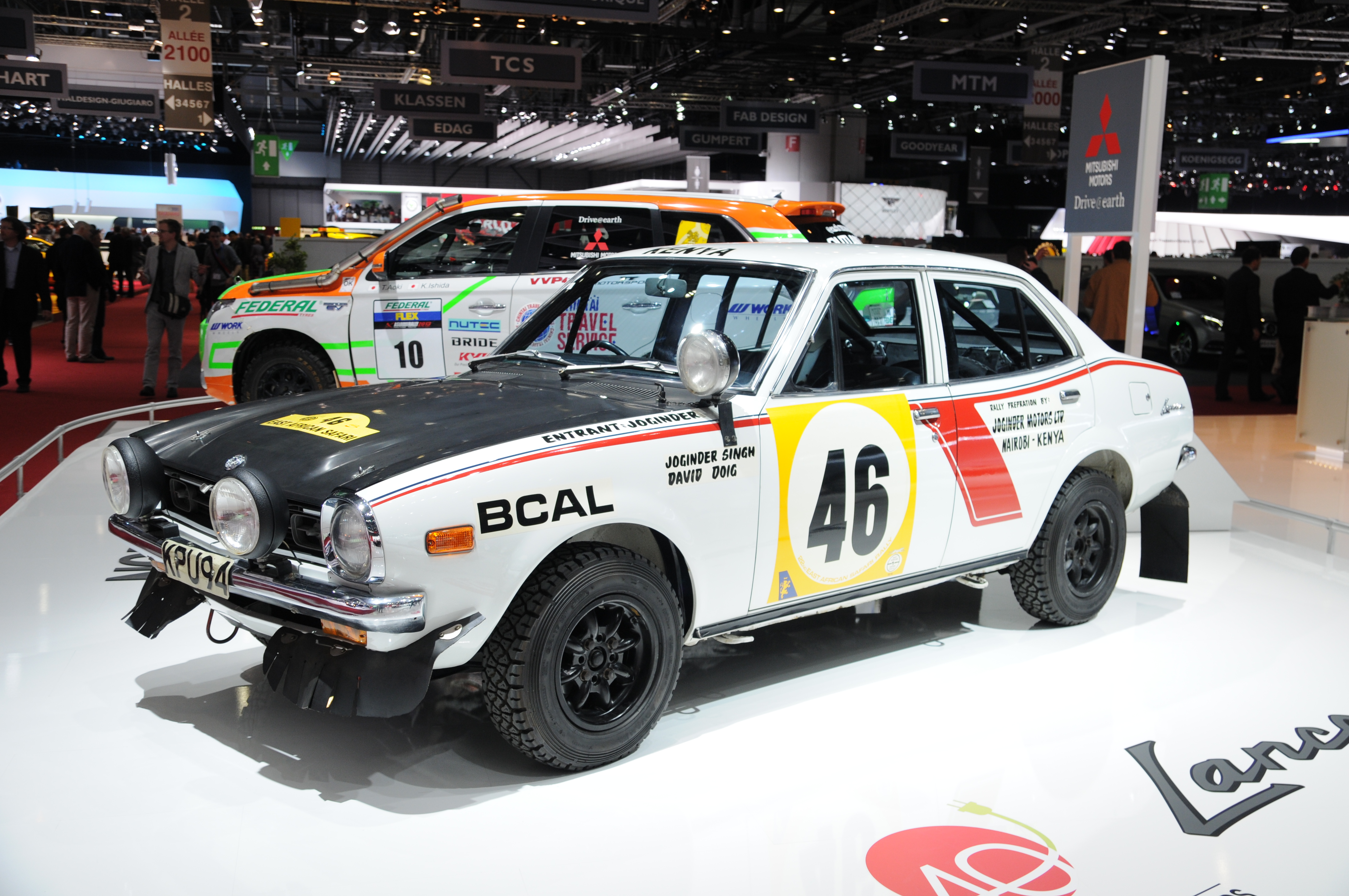
Joginder Singh's Mitsubishi Lancer used in the race, which they won. With the number #46.

The rally was won by local driver, and Safari specialist Joginder Singh. Singh beat off competition from WRC regulars such as Björn Waldegård and Sandro Munari to secure his first WRC victory. The Safari often saw unheralded cars on the winners ramp and this year was no exception - the Mitsubishi Lancer 1600 GSR scored no more points throughout the rest of the season. Fiat held on to their lead in the championship for manufacturers through picking up one point for tenth place.

== Results ==
Pos.	#	Driver	Co-driver	Car	Time	Difference	Points
1974 Safari Rally results
1.	46	(Kenya) Joginder Singh	(Kenya) David Doig	(Japan) Mitsubishi Lancer 1600 GSR	11:18:00	0.0	20
2.	19	(Sweden) Björn Waldegård	(Sweden) Hans Thorszelius	(Germany) Porsche 911	11:46:00	28:00	15
3.	10	(Italy) Sandro Munari	(Kenya) Lofty Drews	(Italy) Lancia Fulvia 1.6 Coupé HF	12:22:00	1:04:00	12
4.	14	(Sweden) Harry Källström	(Sweden) Claes Billstam	(Japan) Datsun 260Z	13:01:00	1:43:00	10
5.	35	(Tanzania) Zully Remtulla	(Tanzania) Nizar Jivani	(Japan) Datsun 260Z	13:29:00	2:11:00	
6.	16	(Finland) Rauno Aaltonen	(West Germany) Wolfgang Stiller	(Japan) Datsun 1800 SSS	13:46:00	2:28:00	
7.	50	(Tanzania) Bert Shankland	(Kenya) Chris Bates	(France) Peugeot 504	14:02:00	2:44:00	4
8.	21	(Kenya) Peter Huth	(Kenya) Phillip Hechle	(France) Peugeot 504	14:41:00	3:23:00	
9.	18	(Kenya) Vic Preston, Jr	(United Kingdom) Roger Barnard	(United Kingdom) Ford Escort RS1600	14:56:00	3:38:00	2
10.	38	(Kenya) Robin Ulyate	(Kenya) Ivan Smith	(Italy) Fiat Abarth 124 Rallye	15:13:00	3:55:00	1
11.	7	(Kenya) Shekhar Mehta	(Kenya) Mike Doughty	(Italy) Lancia Fulvia 1.6 Coupé HF	16:15:00	4:57:00	
12.	26	(Kenya) Davinder Singh	(Kenya) Ken Taylor	(Japan) Mitsubishi Colt Lancer	19:53:00	8:35:00	
13.	33	(Kenya) Jim Noon	(Kenya) Jim Heather-Hayes	(Japan) Mitsubishi Galant	20:06:00	8:48:00	
14.	42	(Zimbabwe) Ernest van Leeve	(Zimbabwe) John Mitchell	(Japan) Mitsubishi Galant	25:19:00	14:01:00	
15.	68	(Kenya) Prem Choda	(Kenya) Pauru Choda	(Japan) Mitsubishi Galant	27:51:00	16:33:00	
16.	31	(Republic of Ireland) Rosemary Smith	(United Kingdom) Pauline Gullick	(Japan) Datsun 1800 SSS	28:57:00	17:39:00	

Source: Independent WRC archive

== Championship standings after the event ==
Rank	Manufacturer	Event								Total points
Rank	Manufacturer	POR (Portugal)	KEN (Kenya)	FIN (Finland)	ITA (Italy)	CAN (Canada)	USA (United States)	GBR (United Kingdom)	FRA (France)	Total points
1	(Italy) Fiat	20	1	-	-	-	-	-	-	21
2	(Japan) Mitsubishi	-	20	-	-	-	-	-	-	20
3	(Japan) Datsun	8	10	-	-	-	-	-	-	18
4	(Germany) Porsche	-	15	-	-	-	-	-	-	15
5	(Italy) Lancia	-	12	-	-	-	-	-	-	12
6	(Japan) Toyota	10	-	-	-	-	-	-	-	10
7	(France) Alpine-Renault	6	-	-	-	-	-	-	-	6
8	(Germany) BMW	4	-	-	-	-	-	-	-	4
8	(France) Peugeot	-	4	-	-	-	-	-	-	4
8	(United States) Ford	2	2	-	-	-	-	-	-	4
11	(France) Citroën	3	-	-	-	-	-	-	-	3
