= Joginder Singh =

Joginder Singh may refer to:

- Joginder Singh (soldier) (1921–1962), subedar in the Indian Army
  - Subedar Joginder Singh (film), a 2019 Indian film about him
- Joginder Singh (rally driver) (1932–2013), Kenyan rally driver
- Joginder Singh (field hockey) (1939–2002), Indian hockey player
- Joginder Singh (politician) (1918–1998), Indian politician
- Joginder Jaswant Singh, born 1945), Chief of Army Staff of India
- Tiger Joginder Singh, Indian professional wrestler
- Joginder Singh Baidwan (1904–1940), Indian cricketer
- Joginder Singh (cricketer, born 1980), Delhi cricketer
- Joginder Singh Dhanaor, Indian athlete
- Joginder Singh Rao (1938–1994), Indian cricketer and major general in the Indian Army
- Joginder Singh (police officer), Indian Police Service officer

== See also ==
- Yoginder (disambiguation)
