= Yoga (disambiguation) =

Yoga (योग) is a Sanskrit word with a general meaning of "connection, conjunction, attachment, union". It may refer to:

== Sanskrit word ==
Yoga

- Yoga, spiritual practices from ancient India
- Yoga (philosophy), one of the six schools of Hindu philosophy
- Raja Yoga, a term originally referring to samadhi, but was redefined by Vivekananda
- Hatha Yoga, a system of physical postures, pranayama and visualization that is partly derived from tantra
  - Yoga as exercise, the worldwide form of exercise derived from Hatha Yoga during the 20th century
- Three Yogas, a concept of three alternate paths to moksha (liberation of soul) in Hinduism
- Asrava, an activity of the mind or body, a cause of Karma in Jainism
- Yoga (Hindu astrology), the term for "conjunction" in Hindu astrology
- Nityayoga, one of the five limbs in Panchangam
- in Sanskrit grammar, a grammatical construction or application of a rule in the Ashtadhyayi

Similar words:

- Yuga, an age or epoch in Hindu chronology

== Japanese words ==
- Yōga, Tokyo (用賀), a neighbourhood of Tokyo
- Yōga Station (用賀駅), a railway station on the Tokyu Den-en-toshi Line located in Tokyo
- Yōga (art) (洋画, literally "Western-style paintings")

== Music ==
- "Yoga" (Janelle Monáe and Jidenna song), 2015
- "Yoga" (Asake song), 2023
- "Yoga", a 2022 song by Brooke Candy
- "Yoga", a song by bbno$ from his album Eat Ya Veggies

== Other uses ==
- Yoga (book), a 2020 book by Emmanuel Carrère
- Yoga (fish), a genus of gobiid fishes
- Lenovo Yoga, a computer brand
- "Yoga", an episode of the television series Teletubbies

== See also ==
- Yog (disambiguation)
- Jog (disambiguation)
- Joga (disambiguation)
- Yogi (disambiguation)
- Jogi (disambiguation)
- Yogo (disambiguation)
