= Safari Rally =

Annual automobile rally in Kenya

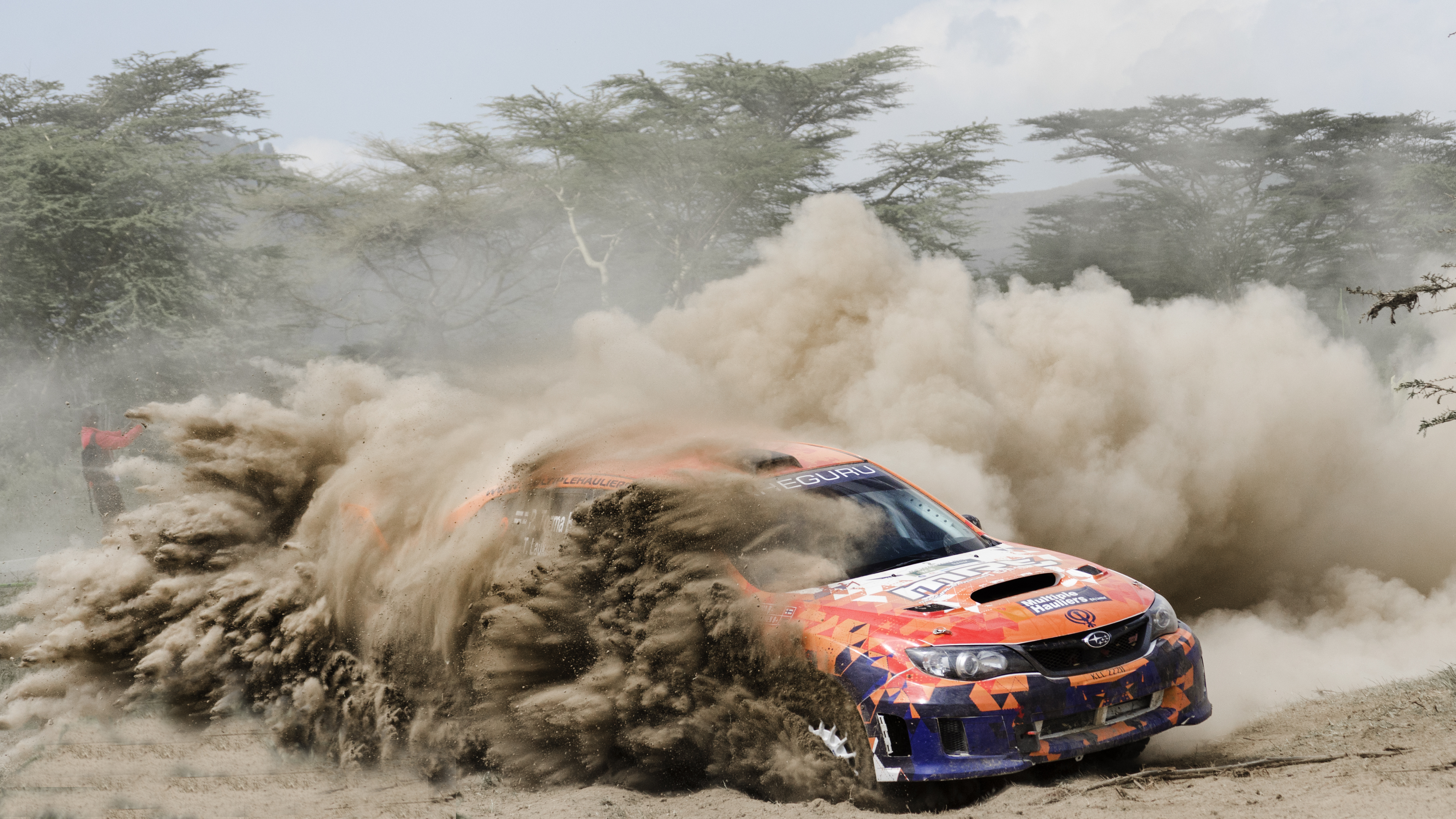
- Status: Active
- Genre: Motorsport event
- Date: June
- Frequency: Annual
- Location: Great Rift Valley
- Country: Kenya
- Inaugurated: 1953
- Website: https://www.safarirally.ke/

The Safari Rally is an automobile rally held in Kenya. It was first held in 1953 as a celebration of the coronation of Queen Elizabeth II. The event was part of the World Rally Championship from 1973 until 2002, before returning in 2021. It is historically regarded as one of the toughest events in the World Rally Championship, and one of the most popular rallies in Africa. From 2003, a historical event (East African Safari Rally) has been held biennially.

== History ==
It was first held from 27 May to 1 June 1953 as the East African Coronation Safari in Kenya, Uganda and Tanganyika, as a celebration of the coronation of Queen Elizabeth II. In 1960 it was renamed the East African Safari Rally and kept that name until 1974, when it became the Safari Rally. From 1973, the rally was part of the World Rally Championship.

The 5,000 kilometres (3,100 mi) route featured a variety of roads and terrain - from fesh fesh (very fine powdered sand), fast farm tracks, and very rough roads up or down the Great Rift Valley. In heavy rain, roads would often turn into thick, deep mud. The event was run on open roads, with all of the route being competitive mileage. The driver with the lowest accumulation of penalty time between time controls was declared the winner.

1972 map

The rally was historically one of the fastest events in the world championship with average speeds over 100 kilometres per hour (62 mph). However, the roughness of the terrain and the long stages meant that the winner was often the most reliable or the fastest cautious driver. In later years, top rally teams would use helicopters to fly ahead of the cars to warn of animals or other vehicles on the rally route.

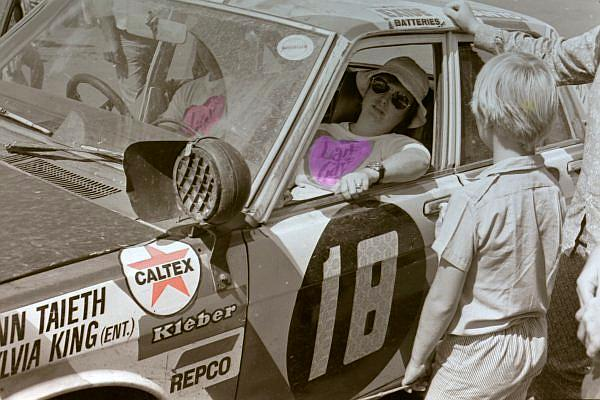
Checkpoint in the 1972 rally.

Teams built specially strengthened cars for the event, with bullbars, snorkels (for river crossings) and bright lights to warn wildlife. In the 1990s, Toyota Team Europe had a full-time test team in Kenya, preparing and testing the rally cars for the event. During the rally, repairs had to be regularly made to the cars, which added to the elapsed time of the competitors. In later years, tyre mousse - allowing tyres to maintain functionality despite a puncture - allowed drivers to tackle the event flat out, despite the length of the event.

In 1996, the event adopted the special stage format, and servicing cars from helicopters was prohibited. From that edition until 2002, it featured around 2000 km of timed stages, with stages well over 60 kilometres (37 mi) long, unlike most rallies which had under 500 kilometres (310 mi) of total timed distance. This meant that the winner's total time penalty was above 12 hours in 1996 and decreased to two seconds shy of 8 hours in 2002. Despite this, the rally continued to be run on open roads. The event was excluded from the WRC calendar due to a lack of finance and organisation in 2003.

=== Modern event ===
From the 2003 edition, the event became part of the African Rally Championship. The event was modernised, with shorter stages and running on closed roads - like other events in the World Championship. Two editions of the rally - 2007 and 2009 - were also part of the Intercontinental Rally Challenge. In 2013, President of Kenya Uhuru Kenyatta announced a plan to return the Safari Rally to the world championship.

On the 27 September 2019, it was announced that the 2020 edition would be part of the World Rally Championship. This event was later cancelled due to the COVID-19 pandemic. The Safari Rally eventually made a comeback to the WRC in 2021 after an eighteen-year hiatus from the 24–27 June, with a successful event held in Kenya on the floor of the Rift Valley in Naivasha, Nakuru County. Sebastian Ogier and Julien Ingrassia emerged as winners in their Toyota Yaris WRC. The Safari has a WRC contract until 2026.

== Winners ==
Kenyan drivers Shekhar Mehta and Carl Tundo have been the most successful competitors, with five outright victories each. Mehta won first in 1973, then consecutively from 1979 to 1982 - all while the event was part of the world championship. Tundo won five editions when the event was part of the African Rally Championship - the 2004, 2009, 2011, 2012 and 2018 events. Tundo has also finished on the podium twelve times, ahead of fellow Kenyan Ian Duncan with nine podium finishes.

Year	Rally Name / Dates	Winning Driver	Co-driver	Winning Car	Status
1953	1st Coronation Safari Rally	(Kenya) Alan Dix	(Kenya) Johnny Larsen	Volkswagen Beetle	
1954	2nd Coronation Safari Rally	(Kenya) D P Marwaha	(Kenya) Vic Preston Sr	Volkswagen Beetle	
1955	3rd Coronation Safari Rally	(Kenya) Vic Preston Sr	(Kenya) D P Marwaha	Ford Zephyr	
1956	4th Coronation Safari Rally	(Kenya) Eric Cecil	(Kenya) Tony Vickers	DKW	
1957	5th Coronation Safari Rally	(Kenya) Gus Hofmann	(Kenya) Arthur Burton	Volkswagen Beetle	
1958	6th Coronation Safari Rally	(Kenya) T. Brooke (Kenya) Arne Kopperud (Kenya) Morris Temple-Boreham	(Kenya) Peter Hughes (Kenya) Kora Kopperud (Kenya) Mike Armstrong	Ford Anglia 100E (Impala class) Ford Zephyr II (Lion class) Auto Union 1000 (Leopard class)	
1959	7th Coronation Safari Rally	(Kenya) Bill Fritschy	(Kenya) Jack Ellis	Mercedes-Benz 219	
1960	8th East African Safari Rally	(Kenya) Bill Fritschy	(Kenya) Jack Ellis	Mercedes-Benz 219	
1961	9th East African Safari Rally	(Kenya) John Manussis	(Kenya) Bill Coleridge (Kenya) David Bekett	Mercedes-Benz 220SE	
1962	10th East African Safari Rally	(Kenya) Tommy Fjastad	(Kenya) Bernhard Schmider	Volkswagen 1200	
1963	11th East African Safari Rally	(Kenya) Nick Nowicki	(Kenya) Paddy Cliff	Peugeot 404	
1964	12th East African Safari Rally	(Kenya) Peter Hughes	(Kenya) Bill Young	Ford Cortina GT	
1965	13th East African Safari Rally	(Kenya) Joginder Singh	(Kenya) Jaswant Singh	Volvo PV 544	
1966	14th East African Safari Rally	(Tanzania) Bert Shankland	(Tanzania) Chris Rothwell	Peugeot 404	
1967	15th East African Safari Rally	(Tanzania) Bert Shankland	(Tanzania) Chris Rothwell	Peugeot 404	
1968	16th East African Safari Rally	(Kenya) Nick Nowicki	(Kenya) Paddy Cliff	Peugeot 404	
1969	17th East African Safari Rally	(Kenya) Robin Hillyar	(Kenya) Jock Aird	Ford Taunus 20M RS	
1970	18th East African Safari Rally	(Kenya) Edgar Herrmann	(West Germany) Hans Schüller	Datsun 1600 SSS	
1971	19th East African Safari Rally	(Kenya) Edgar Herrmann	(West Germany) Hans Schüller	Datsun 240Z	
1972	20th East African Safari Rally (30 Mar – 3 Apr)	(Finland) Hannu Mikkola	(Sweden) Gunnar Palm	Ford Escort RS1600	IMC
1973	21st East African Safari Rally (19 – 23 Apr)	(Kenya) Shekhar Mehta	(Kenya) Lofty Drews	Datsun 240Z	WRC
1974	22nd East African Safari Rally (11 – 15 Apr)	(Kenya) Joginder Singh	(Kenya) David Doig	Mitsubishi Lancer 1600 GSR	WRC
1975	23rd Safari Rally (27 – 31 Mar)	(Sweden) Ove Andersson	(Sweden) Arne Hertz	Peugeot 504	WRC
1976	24th Safari Rally (15 – 19 Apr)	(Kenya) Joginder Singh	(Kenya) David Doig	Mitsubishi Lancer 1600 GSR	WRC
1977	25th Safari Rally (7 – 11 Apr)	(Sweden) Björn Waldegård	(Sweden) Hans Thorszelius	Ford Escort RS1800	WRC
1978	26th Safari Rally (23 – 27 Mar)	(France) Jean-Pierre Nicolas	(France) Jean-Claude Lefèbvre	Peugeot 504 V6 Coupé	WRC
1979	27th Safari Rally (12 – 16 Apr)	(Kenya) Shekhar Mehta	(Kenya) Mike Doughty	Datsun 160J	WRC
1980	28th Marlboro Safari Rally (3 – 7 Apr)	(Kenya) Shekhar Mehta	(Kenya) Mike Doughty	Datsun 160J	WRC
1981	29th Marlboro Safari Rally (16 – 20 Apr)	(Kenya) Shekhar Mehta	(Kenya) Mike Doughty	Nissan Violet GT	WRC
1982	30th Marlboro Safari Rally (8 – 12 Apr)	(Kenya) Shekhar Mehta	(Kenya) Mike Doughty	Nissan Violet GT	WRC
1983	31st Marlboro Safari Rally (30 Mar – 4 Apr)	(Finland) Ari Vatanen	(United Kingdom) Terry Harryman	Opel Ascona 400	WRC
1984	32nd Marlboro Safari Rally (19 – 23 Apr)	(Sweden) Björn Waldegård	(Sweden) Hans Thorszelius	Toyota Celica TCT	WRC
1985	33rd Marlboro Safari Rally (4 – 8 Apr)	(Finland) Juha Kankkunen	(United Kingdom) Fred Gallagher	Toyota Celica TCT	WRC
1986	34th Marlboro Safari Rally (29 Mar – 2 Apr)	(Sweden) Björn Waldegård	(United Kingdom) Fred Gallagher	Toyota Celica TCT	WRC
1987	35th Marlboro Safari Rally (16 – 20 Apr)	(Finland) Hannu Mikkola	(Sweden) Arne Hertz	Audi 200 Quattro	WRC
1988	36th Marlboro Safari Rally (31 Mar – 4 Apr)	(Italy) Miki Biasion	(Italy) Tiziano Siviero	Lancia Delta HF Integrale	WRC
1989	37th Marlboro Safari Rally (23–27 Mar)	(Italy) Miki Biasion	(Italy) Tiziano Siviero	Lancia Delta HF Integrale	WRC
1990	38th Marlboro Safari Rally (11–16 Apr)	(Sweden) Björn Waldegård	(United Kingdom) Fred Gallagher	Toyota Celica GT-Four ST165	WRC
1991	39th Martini Safari Rally; 27 (Mar – 1 Apr)	(Finland) Juha Kankkunen	(Finland) Juha Piironen	Lancia Delta HF Integrale 16v	WRC
1992	40th Martini Safari Rally; 27 (Mar – 1 Apr)	(Spain) Carlos Sainz	(Spain) Luis Moya	Toyota Celica Turbo 4WD	WRC
1993	41st Trustbank Safari Rally (8–12 Apr)	(Finland) Juha Kankkunen	(Finland) Juha Piironen	Toyota Celica Turbo 4WD	WRC
1994	42nd Trustbank Safari Rally (31 Mar – 3 Apr)	(Kenya) Ian Duncan	(Kenya) David Williamson	Toyota Celica Turbo 4WD	WRC
1995	43rd Safari Rally Kenya (14–17 Apr)	(Japan) Yoshio Fujimoto	(Sweden) Arne Hertz	Toyota Celica Turbo 4WD	2LWC
1996	44th Safari Rally Kenya (5–7 Apr)	(Finland) Tommi Mäkinen	(Finland) Seppo Harjanne	Mitsubishi Lancer Evolution III	WRC
1997	45th Safari Rally Kenya (1–3 Mar)	(United Kingdom) Colin McRae	(United Kingdom) Nicky Grist	Subaru Impreza WRC97	WRC
1998	46th Safari Rally Kenya (28 Feb – 2 Mar)	(United Kingdom) Richard Burns	(United Kingdom) Robert Reid	Mitsubishi Carisma GT Evolution IV (Mitsubishi Lancer Evolution IV)	WRC
1999	47th 555 Safari Rally (26–28 Feb)	(United Kingdom) Colin McRae	(United Kingdom) Nicky Grist	Ford Focus WRC	WRC
2000	48th Sameer Safari Rally (25–27 Feb)	(United Kingdom) Richard Burns	(United Kingdom) Robert Reid	Subaru Impreza WRC00	WRC
2001	49th Safari Rally (20–22 Jul)	(Finland) Tommi Mäkinen	(Finland) Risto Mannisenmäki	Mitsubishi Lancer Evolution 6.5	WRC
2002	50th Inmarsat Safari Rally (12–14 Jul)	(United Kingdom) Colin McRae	(United Kingdom) Nicky Grist	Ford Focus RS WRC 02	WRC
2003	51st KCB Safari Equator Rally Kenya (9–11 Oct)	(Kenya) Glen Edmunds	(Kenya) Titch Phillips	Mitsubishi Lancer Evolution VI	ARC
2004	52nd KCB Safari Rally Kenya (12–14 Mar)	(Kenya) Carl Tundo	(Kenya) Tim Jessop	Subaru Impreza	ARC
2005	53rd KCB Safari Rally (15th – 17th Jul)	(Kenya) Glen Edmunds	(Kenya) Des Page-Morris	Mitsubishi Lancer Evolution VII	ARC
2006	54th KCB Safari Rally (24 – 26 Mar)	(Kenya) Azar Anwar	(Kenya) George Mwangi	Mitsubishi Lancer Evolution VI	ARC
2007	55th KCB Safari Rally (9–11 Mar)	(Zimbabwe) Conrad Rautenbach	(Zimbabwe) Peter Marsh	Subaru Impreza N10	IRC & ARC
2008	56th KCB Safari Rally (27–29 Jun)	(Kenya) Lee Rose	(Kenya) Piers Daykin	Mitsubishi Lancer Evolution IX	ARC
2009	57th KCB Safari Rally (3–5 Apr)	(Kenya) Carl Tundo	(Kenya) Tim Jessop	Mitsubishi Lancer Evolution IX	IRC & ARC
2010	58th KCB Safari Rally (2–4 Apr)	(Kenya) Lee Rose	(Kenya) Piers Daykin	Mitsubishi Lancer Evolution IX	ARC
2011	59th KCB Safari Rally (17–19 Jun)	(Kenya) Carl Tundo	(Kenya) Tim Jessop	Mitsubishi Lancer Evolution IX	ARC
2012	60th KCB Safari Rally (8–10 Jun)	(Kenya) Carl Tundo	(Kenya) Tim Jessop	Mitsubishi Lancer Evolution IX	ARC
2013	61st KCB Safari Rally (5–7 Jul)	(Kenya) Baldev Chager	(Kenya) Ravi Soni	Mitsubishi Lancer Evolution X	ARC
2014	62nd KCB Safari Rally (12–14 Sep)	(Kenya) Baldev Chager	(Kenya) Ravi Soni	Mitsubishi Lancer Evolution X	ARC
2015	63rd KCB Safari Rally (4–5 Apr)	(Kenya) Singh Chatthe Jaspreet	(Kenya) Panesar Gurdeep	Mitsubishi Lancer Evolution X R4	KRC
2016	64th KCB Safari Rally (10–11 Jun)	(Kenya) Singh Chatthe Jaspreet	(Kenya) Panesar Gurdeep	Mitsubishi Lancer Evolution X R4	KRC
2017	65th Safari Rally (17–18 Mar)	(Finland) Tapio Laukkanen	(Kenya) Gavin Laurence	Subaru Impreza WRX STi 4 D R4	ARC & KRC
2018	66th Safari Rally (16–18 Mar)	(Kenya) Carl Tundo	(Kenya) Tim Jessop	Mitsubishi Lancer Evolution X R4	ARC & KRC
2019	67th Safari Rally (5–7 Jul)	(Kenya) Baldev Chager	(Kenya) Ravi Soni	Mitsubishi Lancer Evolution X R4	ARC & KRC
2020	68th Safari Rally (16–19 Jul)	Cancelled due to COVID-19 concerns			
2021	68th Safari Rally (24–27 Jun)	(France) Sébastien Ogier	(France) Julien Ingrassia	Toyota Yaris WRC	WRC
2022	69th Safari Rally (23–26 Jun)	(Finland) Kalle Rovanperä	(Finland) Jonne Halttunen	Toyota GR Yaris Rally1	WRC
2023	70th Safari Rally (22–25 Jun)	(France) Sebastien Ogier	(France) Vincent Landais	Toyota GR Yaris Rally1	WRC
2024	71st Safari Rally (28–31 Mar)	(Finland) Kalle Rovanperä	(Finland) Jonne Halttunen	Toyota GR Yaris Rally1	WRC
2025	72nd Safari Rally (20-23 Mar)	(United Kingdom) Elfyn Evans	(United Kingdom) Scott Martin	Toyota GR Yaris Rally1	WRC
2026	73rd Safari Rally (12-15 Mar)	(Japan) Takamoto Katsuta	(Republic of Ireland) Aaron Johnston	Toyota GR Yaris Rally1	WRC

Notes: IMC = International Championship for Manufacturers, WRC = World Rally Championship, 2LWC = 2-Litre World Cup, ARC = African Rally Championship, IRC = Intercontinental Rally Challenge, KRC = Kenya National Rally Championship

== East African Safari Rally (classic) ==
The East African Safari Rally officially known as East African Safari classic Rally is a Classic rally event first held in 2003 to coincide with the 50th anniversary of the first running of the event. The event has since been held biennially. The nine day event takes place over 5,000 kilometres (3,100 mi), and is open to vehicles built before 1985. The 2017 edition of the rally had joint winners, as both Richard Jackson and Carl Tundo had the same time.

Year	Dates	Winning Driver	Winning Co-driver	Winning Car
2003	Dec 10 – Dec 19	(Kenya) Rob Collinge (Kenya) Anton Levitan	(Kenya) Anton Levitan	Datsun 240Z
2005	Dec 1 – Dec 10	(Kenya) Rob Collinge	(Kenya) Anton Levitan	Datsun 260Z
2007	Nov 25 – Dec 3	(Sweden) Björn Waldegård	(Sweden) Mathias Waldegård	Ford Escort Mk1
2009	Nov 22 – Dec 1	(Kenya) Ian Duncan	(Kenya) Amaar Slatch	Ford Mustang
2011	Nov 20 – Nov 28	(Sweden) Björn Waldegård	(Sweden) Mathias Waldegård	Porsche 911
2013	Nov 21 – Nov 29	(Kenya) Ian Duncan	(Kenya) Amaar Slatch	Ford Capri
2015	Nov 19 – Nov 27	(Sweden) Stig Blomqvist	(Belgium) Stéphane Prévot	Porsche 911
2017	Nov 23 – Dec 1	(United Kingdom) Richard Jackson (United Kingdom) Ryan Champion jointly with (Kenya) Carl Tundo (Kenya) Tim Jessop		Porsche 911 Triumph TR7
2019	Nov 27 – Dec 6	(Austria) Kris Rosenberger	(Germany) Niki Bleicher	Porsche 911
2022*	Feb 10 – 18	(Kenya) Baldev Chager	(United Kingdom) Drew Sturrock	Porsche 911
2023	Dec 9 – 18	(Italy) Eugenio Amos	(Italy) Paolo Ceci	Porsche 911
2025	Dec 5 – 12	(United Kingdom) Harry Hunt	(United Kingdom) Steve McPhee	Porsche 911

* The 2022 event was originally scheduled for 2021, but was delayed due to the COVID-19 pandemic.

== See also ==
- Safari Rally (1978 film)
- Safari 3000 (1982 film)
- Ronald Ssebuguzi
