= Jogan =

Jogan may refer to:

- Yogini, a female practitioner of yoga
- Jogan (surname), a family name
- Jōgan, Japanese era name
- Jogan Shankar, an Indian academic administrator
- Jogan (film), a 1950 Indian Hindi-language film

== See also ==
- Jogi (disambiguation)
