= 1973 Safari Rally =

Rallying motorsport event

1973 Safari Rally 21st East Africa Safari Rally
Round 4 of the 1973 World Rally Championship season
| ← Previous event | Next event → |
- Host country: Kenya
- Rally base: Nairobi, Kenya
- Dates run: April 19, 1973 – April 23, 1973
- Length: 5,300 km (3,300 miles)
- Stage surface: Gravel
- Overall distance: 5,300 km (3,300 miles) (with 56 points of "time control")

Statistics
- Crews: 89 at start, 18 at finish

Overall results
- Overall winner: (Kenya) Shekhar Mehta (Kenya) Lofty Drews (Japan) Datsun; Datsun 240Z

The 1973 Safari Rally (formally the 21st East Africa Safari Rally) was the fourth round of the inaugural World Rally Championship season. Run in mid-April in central Kenya, the Safari was a markedly different rally from the other dates on the WRC schedule. About 5,300 km (3,300 mi) of gravel roads comprised the course, though there were not distinct special stages as in other rallies, but instead the course was uncontrolled. The rally was considered very punishing, and thus many of the successful teams were specifically focused on it, leading to a different set of front-runners than led most other rallies. The rally was won by a local driver, Shekhar Mehta.

== Report ==
In 1973, and for several years afterward, only manufacturers were given points for finishes in WRC events. Like the drivers, the cars were different for Africa than for other rallies. As a result, the successful types did not mirror the results of other rallies on the circuit, and Datsun and Peugeot both made strong showings. Additionally, cars were not broken into separate groups or classes as in other rallies, so only overall results were classified. Time was not measured as the total elapsed through special stages as with other rallies, but instead a penalty was assessed at each time control for not meeting the target: total penalty time was the measure of who was in what place.

== Results ==
1973 Safari Rally results
| Finish | Penalty | Car # | Driver Co-driver | Car | Mfr. points |
|---|---|---|---|---|---|
| 1 | 6 m : 46 s | 1 | (Kenya) Shekhar Mehta (Kenya) Lofty Drews | (Japan) Datsun 240Z | 20 |
| 2 | 6 m : 46 s | 9 | (Sweden) Harry Källström (Sweden) Claes Billstam | (Japan) Datsun 1800 SSS | |
| 3 | 8 m : 47 s | 7 | (Sweden) Ove Andersson (France) Jean Todt | (France) Peugeot 504 | 12 |
| 4 | 9 m : 14 s | 19 | (United Kingdom) Tony Fall (United Kingdom) Mike Wood | (Japan) Datsun 1800 SSS | |
| 5 | 12 m : 7 s | 28 | (Kenya) Peter Huth (Kenya) John McConnell | (France) Peugeot 504 | |
| 6 | 13 m : 10 s | 17 | (Kenya) Hugh Lionnet (Kenya) Phillip Hechle | (France) Peugeot 504 | |
| 7 | 14 m : 3 s | 20 | (Zambia) Satwant Singh (Zimbabwe) John Mitchell | (Japan) Mitsubishi Colt Galant | 4 |
| 8 | 14 m : 34 s | 23 | (Kenya) Robin Ulyate (Kenya) Ivan Smith | (Italy) Fiat 125 S | |
| 9 | 14 m : 37 s | 27 | (Kenya) Mike Kirkland (Kenya) Bruce Field | (Japan) Datsun 1600 SSS | |
| 10 | 15 m : 5 s | 44 | (Kenya) Jim Noon (United Kingdom) Rager Barnard | (Japan) Datsun 1600 SSS | |
| 11 | 16 m : 16 s | 18 | (Kenya) Joginder Singh (Kenya) Tim Samuels | (Japan) Mitsubishi Galant | |
| 12 | 17 m : 57 s | 15 | (Tanzania) Zully Remtulla (Tanzania) Nizar Jivani | (Japan) Datsun 1800 SSS | |
| 13 | 18 m : 58 s | | (Kenya) Pat Neylan (Kenya) Lofty Reynolds | (Japan) Mazda RX-2 | |
| 14 | 19 m : 8 s | 3 | (Kenya) Vic Preston Jr. (United Kingdom) Bev Smith | (United Kingdom) Ford Escort RS1600 | |
| 15 | 20 m : 0 s | | (Kenya) Brian Barton (Kenya) Chris Flyer | (Japan) Datsun 180B | |
| 16 | 20 m : 12 s | | (Kenya) Davinder Singh (Kenya) David Doig | (Japan) Mitsubishi Galant | |
| 17 | 20 m : 19 s | | (Kenya) Ewart Walker (Kenya) Anton Levitan | (Japan) Datsun 1600 SSS | |
| 18 | 20 m : 52 s | | (Kenya) John Rose (Kenya) Steve Rose | (Japan) Datsun 1600 SSS | |
| Retired (mechanical) | | 2 | (United Kingdom) Roger Clark (United Kingdom) Jim Porter | (United Kingdom) Ford Escort RS1600 | |
| Retired (mechanical) | | 4 | (Finland) Hannu Mikkola (United Kingdom) John Davenport | (United Kingdom) Ford Escort RS1600 | |
| Retired (mechanical) | | 5 | (Poland) Sobiesław Zasada (Poland) Marian Bień | (Germany) Porsche 911 | |
| Retired (accident) | | 6 | (Finland) Rauno Aaltonen (United Kingdom) Paul Easter | (Japan) Datsun 240Z | |
| Retired (accident) | | 8 | (Tanzania) Bert Shankland (Kenya) Chris Bates | (France) Peugeot 504 | |
| Retired (mechanical) | | 10 | (Sweden) Björn Waldegård (Sweden) Hans Thorszelius | (Germany) Porsche 911 | |
| Retired (mechanical) | | 11 | (Kenya) Edgar Herrmann (Germany) Hans Schüller | (Japan) Datsun 240Z | |
| Retired (excluded) | | 14 | (Kenya) Perre Parsons (Kenya) Jim Cowper | (France) Peugeot 504 | |
| Retired (accident) | | 16 | (Finland) Timo Mäkinen (United Kingdom) Henry Liddon | (United Kingdom) Ford Escort RS1600 | |
| Retired (mechanical) | | 22 | (Kenya) Jack Simonian (Kenya) Mike Doughty | (Italy) Alfa Romeo 1750 GTV | |
| Retired (mechanical) | | 25 | (United Kingdom) Bill Fritschy (Kenya) Kim Mandeville | (Germany) Porsche 911 | |
| Retired (accident) | | 29 | (Kenya) Peter Shikuyah (Kenya) Kim Gatende | (United Kingdom) Ford Escort RS1600 | |

Source: Independent WRC archive

== Championship standings after the event ==
1973 World Rally Championship for Manufacturers points standings after round 4
| After round 4 | | Team | Season end | |
| Position | Points | Team | Position | Points |
|---|---|---|---|---|
| 1 | 52 | (France) Alpine Renault | 1 | 147 |
| 2 | 22 | (Japan) Datsun | 6 | 34 |
| 3 | 22 | (Italy) Fiat | 2 | 84 |
| 4 | 20 | (Sweden) Saab | 5 | 42 |
| 5 | 13 | (Italy) Lancia | 13 | 17 |
| 6 | 12 | (France) Citroën | 7 | 33 |
| 6 | 12 | (France) Peugeot | 16 | 13 |
| 8 | 12 | (United States) Ford | 3 | 76 |
| 9 | 8 | (Germany) Porsche | 9 | 27 |
| 10 | 6 | (Germany) Volkswagen | 15 | 15 |
| 11 | 5 | (Germany) Opel | 11 | 25 |
| 12 | 4 | (Germany) BMW | 8 | 28 |
| 12 | 4 | (Japan) Mitsubishi | 17 | 4 |
| 11 | 3 | (Czechoslovakia) Škoda | 18 | 3 |
| 13 | 2 | (Sweden) Volvo | 4 | 44 |
