= Jogi =

Jogi may refer to:

== Art and entertainment ==
- Jogi (2005 film), a Kannada film
- Jogi (2022 film), a Hindi film
- "Jogi" (Panjabi MC song), 2003
- "Jogi" (The Sketches song), a song by Pakistani Sufi-rock band The Sketches

== Other uses ==
- Jogi (caste), a major Hindu social group of South Asia
- Jogi language, an Indo-Aryan language of India and Pakistan
- Jogi Faqir, a Muslim community of South Asia
- Jogi (Afghanistan), one of the peripatetic groups of Afghanistan
- Yogi, or jogi, a yoga practitioner
- Yogi Nath, a Shaivism-related group of monks

== People with the name ==
- Jõgi, Estonian surname, including list of people with the name
- Jogi (Kannada writer) (born 1965), a Kannada writer and journalist
- Jogi Löw, nickname of Joachim Löw (born 1960), German football manager
- Jogi Ram Sihag, Indian politician
- Ajit Jogi (born 1946), Indian politician
- Amit Jogi (born 1977), Indian politician, Ajit's son
- Renu Jogi, Indian politician elected to the Chhattisgarh Legislative Assembly
- Santhosh Jogi (1974/1975 – 2010), Malayalee film actor and singer
- Sunil Jogi (born 1971), Indian author and poet and government minister in Uttar Pradesh

== See also ==
- Jogi-jeot (조기젓), a side dish in Korean cuisine
- Jogidas Khuman (disambiguation)
- Yogi (disambiguation)
- Yoga (disambiguation)
- Jogan (disambiguation)
