= Yoginder =

Yoginder may refer to:

- Yogi, a practitioner of yoga
- Yoginder K Alagh, an Indian economist
- Yoginder Sikand, an Indian writer

== See also ==
- Yogi (disambiguation)
- Inder (disambiguation)
- Joginder Singh (disambiguation)
