= Yog =

Yog, or YOG may refer to:

== People ==
- Yog Japee (fl. from 2003), Indian actor
- Yog Joy (1938–1996), Indian photojournalist
- Yog Raj Sharma (born 1950), Indian ophthalmologist
- Yog Sysop, nickname of James D. Macdonald (born 1954), American author and critic who coined "Yog's Law"

== Other uses ==
- Yog: Monster From Space, U.S. release of Space Amoeba, a 1970 kaiju film
- Youth Olympic Games, an international multi-sport event
- Ogoki Post Airport, in Ontario Canada, IATA code YOG
- A US Navy hull classification symbol: Gasoline barge, self propelled (YOG)

== See also ==
- Yoga (Sanskrit: योग), a group of physical, mental, and spiritual practices or disciplines which originated in ancient India
  - Yoga (disambiguation)
- Yog-Sothoth, a fictional entity in the Cthulhu Mythos of H. P. Lovecraft
- Yogh, Middle English letter ȝ
- Yogi (disambiguation)
- Jog (disambiguation)
