= Sadguru Jog Maharaj Warkari Shikshan Sanstha =

Indian non-profit organisation

- Swanand Sukhniwasi Sadguru Jog Maharaj Warkari Shikshan Sanstha
- स्वानंद सुखनिवासी सद्गुरू जोग महाराज वारकरी शिक्षण संस्था
- Logo of the organisation
- Named after: Jog Maharaj
- Formation: March 24, 1917; 109 years ago
- Founder: Jog Maharaj
- Location: Alandi, Maharashtra, India
- Official language: Marathi
- Owner: Sadguru Jog Maharaj Prasadik Warkari Shikshan Charitable Trust
- President: Sandipan Maharaj Hasegaonkar
- Website: sadgurujogmaharajtrust.org

Sadguru Jog Maharaj Warkari Shikshan Sanstha is a Warkari educational institution established by Jog Maharaj in 1917 in Alandi, near Pune, is the first Warkari institution in India. It draws students from Maharashtra and various other states like Uttar Pradesh, Madhya Pradesh, Gujarat, Karnataka, and Tamil Nadu who come to study the Warkari Sampradaya philosophy.

== History ==
During the British rule in India, Jog Maharaj founded Warkari education institute at Alandi in 1917 on the principle of no fee for students and no salary for teachers. Established with the purpose of spreading and propagating the philosophy of Warkari sect by studying the philosophy of the books of Warkari saints like Dnyaneshwari, Amritanubhav, Gatha etc. The first founder president of the institute was Vishnu Maharaj Jog, the first class of six students was taken by Mamasaheb Dandekar. After the establishment of the institute, under the guidance of its founder Jog Maharaj, Banktaswami, Maruti Maharaj Gurav, Laxman Maharaj Igatpurikar and Mamasaheb Dandekar continued the organization respectively, and later managed by Vitthal Chaudhary, Vitthal Ghule, Madhukar Shimpi, Ramchandra Baba Nikam, Pandurang Vaidya, Maruti Kurhekar.

Bal Gangadhar Tilak of Kesari wrote the foreword and mentioned the national work of the organization.

== Controversy ==
Dinkar Balaji Bhukele, Sukhdev Shivajirao Pawar, Suresh Gopalrao Garsole, and Badrinath Kisanrao Deshmukh, trustees of the institution, were accused of defrauding the Board of Trustees. They allegedly convened a meeting without the chairman's permission and falsified minutes regarding the appointment of the Institution's Secretary. This led to a case being filed at the Alandi police station.
