= Yogo =

Yogo may refer to:

- YoGo - an Australian snack
- Yogo sapphire - a variety of sapphire found in Yogo Gulch, Montana
- Yogo, Shiga - a town in Japan
- Yogo (yoga) - a children's exercise based on yoga featured on the program Waybuloo
- Yogo Island, island on Lake Chad in Chad

== See also ==
- iögo (pronounced "yogo") – a Canadian brand of yogurt
