= Yogo Island =

Island on Lake Chad in Chad

The Yogo Island is an island on Lake Chad in Chad.
