= Joga (disambiguation) =

"Jóga" is a song recorded by Icelandic singer, songwriter and actress Björk for her third studio album Homogenic.

Joga may also refer to:

- Joga, Uttar Pradesh, a village in India
- Kartam Joga, Indian political activist
- Soyam Joga, Indian politician

== See also ==
- Yoga (disambiguation)
