= Gauri Jog =

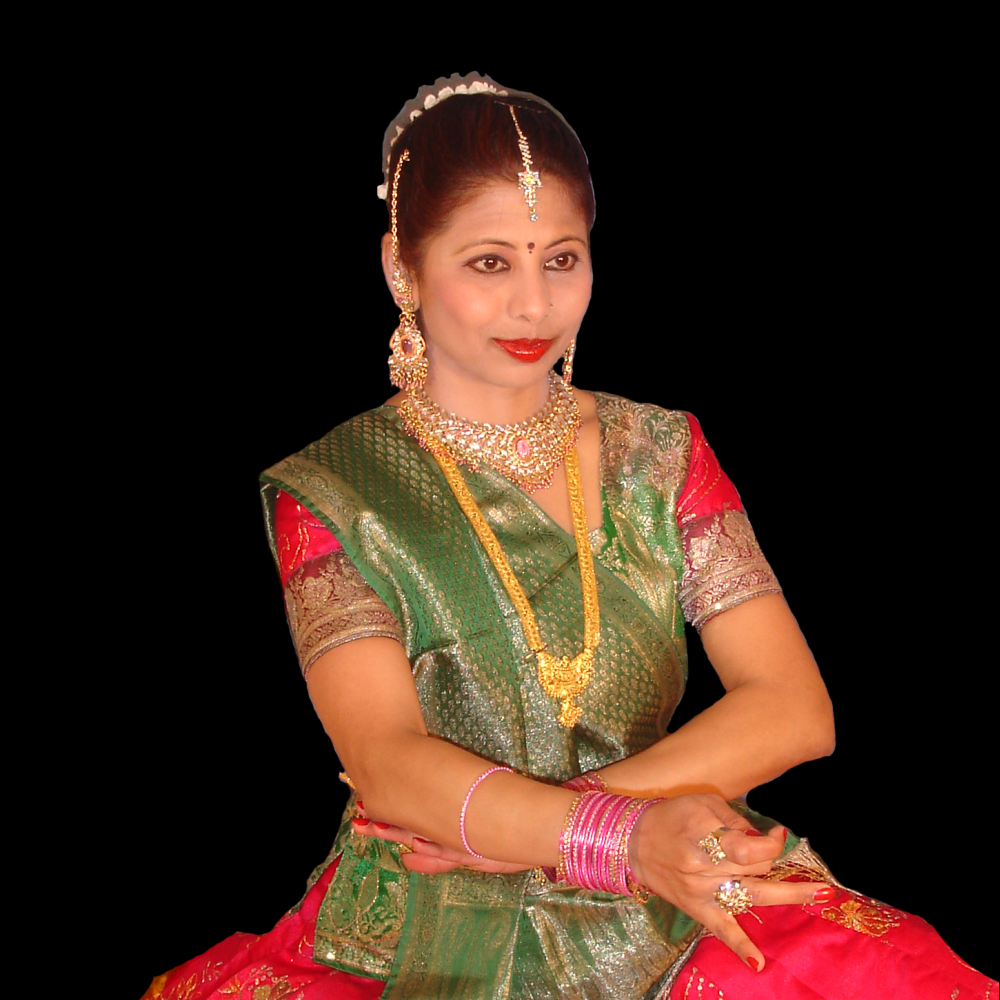
- Gauri Jog performing Kathak Dance
- Born: Gauri Kale; Nagpur, India
- Occupations: Kathak Dancer, Teacher and Choreographer
- Website: http://www.gaurijog.com

Gauri Jog is a Kathak dancer, Choreographer and research scholar from Chicago. She has been practicing Kathak dance and considered as an exponent of Lucknow and Jaipur Gharana. Her creations include Krishna Leela, Shakuntala, Jhansi Ki Rani, Kathak Yatra, East meets West, Fire - the Fiery Tale among others. She brings to life traditional "art of storytelling" through the technical elements in Kathak. She is very popular especially among younger generation due to her unique approach to combine some Bollywood steps and Yoga into the Kathak while taking care not to cross the boundaries of tradition. Her experiments with combining Kathak with Flamenco, Bharatanatyam, Odissi, Mexican and American Ballet have won many accolades. Since 1999 Gauri Jog and her group have performed more than 325 dance shows in North America and India.

== Early life and background ==
Gauri Jog was born in 1970 at Nagpur and received intense, disciplined and meticulous training from her Guru Madan Pande of Lucknow Gharana who emphasized rhythmic footwork and its permutations. She also studied Kathak dance from Lalita Hardas of Jaipur Gharana, known for the art of abhinaya. She also studied from Madhurita Sarang of Mumbai. She started dance training at 5 and gave her first performance when she was 7 years old. Gauri Jog obtained Bachelor of Science and Nutrition and Masters in Education from University of Nagpur. She has attended numerous workshops by eminent Kathak Gurus from India including Pandit Birju Maharaj. She practices combination of Lucknow and Jaipur Gharana of Kathak.

== Official Website ==
- Gauri Jog
