= Jog Maharaj =

Indian Marathi Kirtankar and preacher

Sadguru Jog Maharaj
- Jog Maharaj
- Born: Vishnu Narsimha Jog; 14 September 1867; Poona, Bombay Presidency, British India
- Died: 5 February 1920 (aged 52); Alandi, Bombay Presidency, British India
- Other names: Vishnubuva Jog
- Occupations: Founder of Warkari Shikshan Sanstha; kirtankar; preacher
- Parents: Narsimha alias Narsopant (father); Saraswati Devi (mother)

Vishnu Narsimha Jog (14 September 1867 – 5 February 1920) popularly known as Jog Maharaj, was a Marathi Kirtankar and preacher, he established India's first Warkari Shikshan Sanstha in Alandi in 1917.

He initiated social awareness campaigns by adopting the thoughts of Sant Tukaram. To the ignorant and illiterate, he explained the philosophy of Warkari Sampradaya worldview in plain, understandable words. With the intention of bringing Warkari Sampradaya to the masses in Maharashtra, Jog Maharaj founded Warkari Shikshan Sanstha in Alandi. He generated hundreds of preachers and kirtankars through this institution. As of now, hundreds of kirtankars are evangelizing villages across the world consequently of his vision.

Jog Maharaj was a propagator of Warkari Sampradaya. He studied many books of Marathi saints. He was the first to interpret the Abhanga's of Tukaram Maharaj and create Sarth Gatha. Sarth Amritanubhav, classified saga of Niloba Maharaja and Dnyaneshwar Maharaj, Sarth Haripath and Changdev Pasashti, six books of Eknathi Bhagavata, Vedantavichara, Veche (Sarth) of Mahipatized Dnyaneshwari etc. were published by Jog. He remained a Brahmachari throughout his life.

== Early life and family ==
Vishnubuva was born on 14 September 1867 in Pune, to Narsimha and Saraswati Devi. He had four siblings, he was the youngest. His father Narasopant was the teacher of Raja of Sawantwadi. He has completed his education up to 4th standard in Modi script. In the Jog Maharaj's family there was a generational Pehlwanaki. He had a knack for Malla-Vidya since childhood. His elder brother Pandoba was a renowned Malla of Pune. He was the ustad of Nagarkar Talim in Pune.

== Warkari Shikshan Sanstha ==
Jog Maharaj established the first Warkari Shishan Sanstha in 1917 in Alandi. Bankatswami, Lakshmanbuwa Igatpurikar, Marutibuwa Gurav, Pandurang Sharma, Lakshmanbuwa Kundkar were disciples of Jog Maharaj who continued the Warkari Shikshan Sanstha.

== Legacy ==
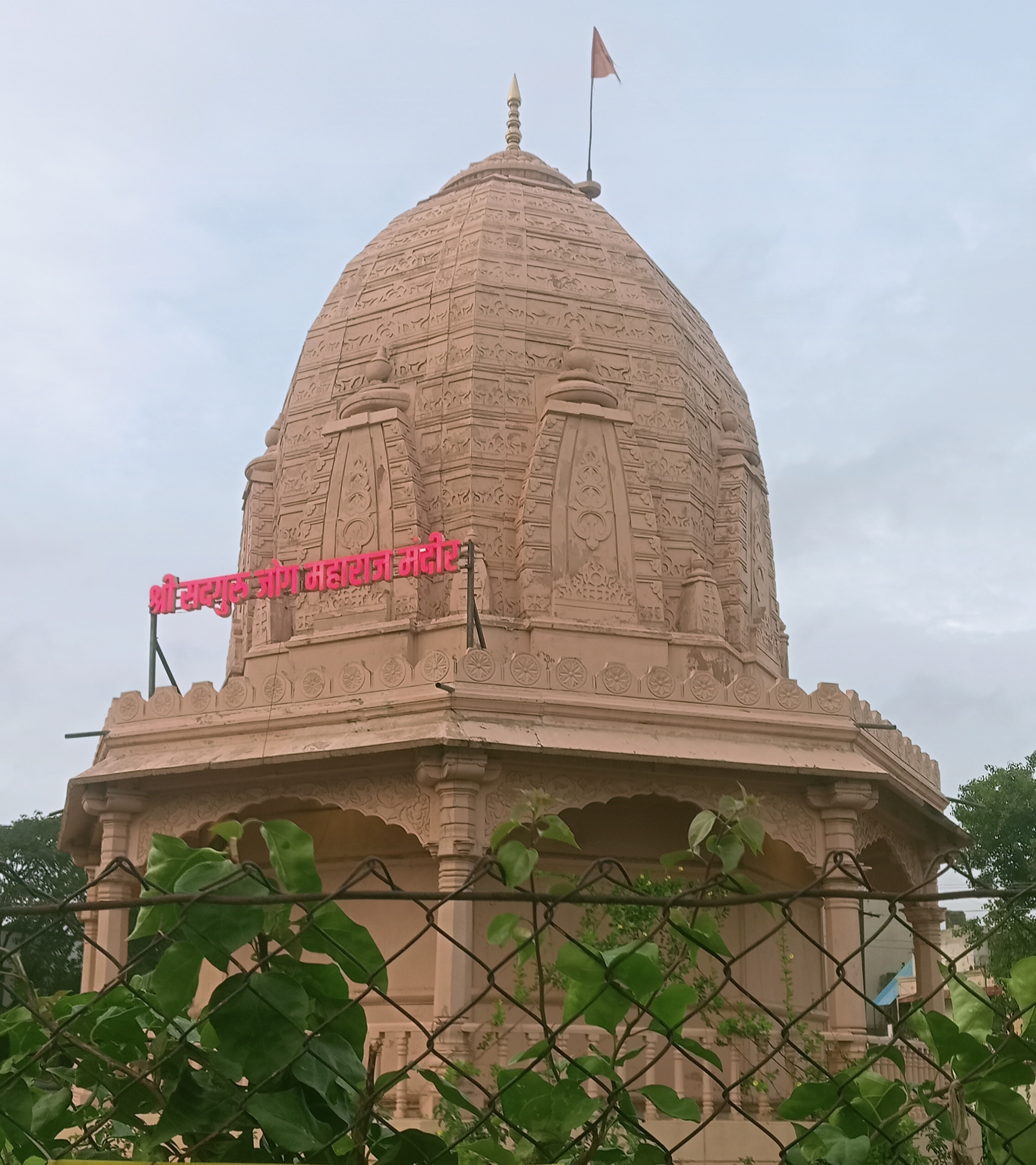
Shree Sadguru Jog Maharaj Temple at Warkari Shikshan Sanstha.

The death anniversary of Jog Maharaj is celebrated as Punyatithi Utsav starts from Magh Shuddha Navami in Alandi.

The obituary of Jog published in Kesari newspaper was written by Bal Gangadhar Tilak himself.
