= Jogan (surname) =

Jogan is a surname. Notable people with the surname include:

- Alen Jogan (born 1985), Slovene footballer
- Ana Bucik Jogan (born 1993), Slovene alpine ski racer
- Kris Jogan (born 1991), Slovene footballer
