= Edgar Herrmann =

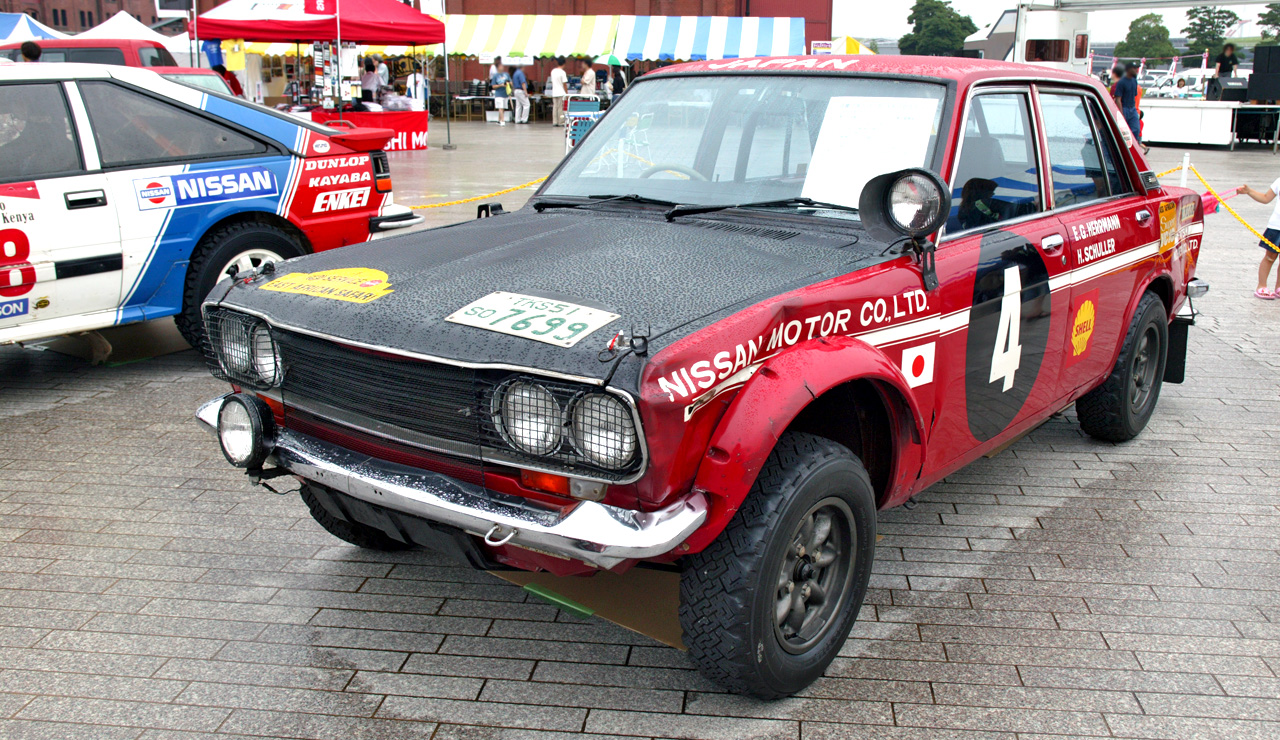
Herrmann's 1970 Safari Rally -winning Datsun 1600 SSS.

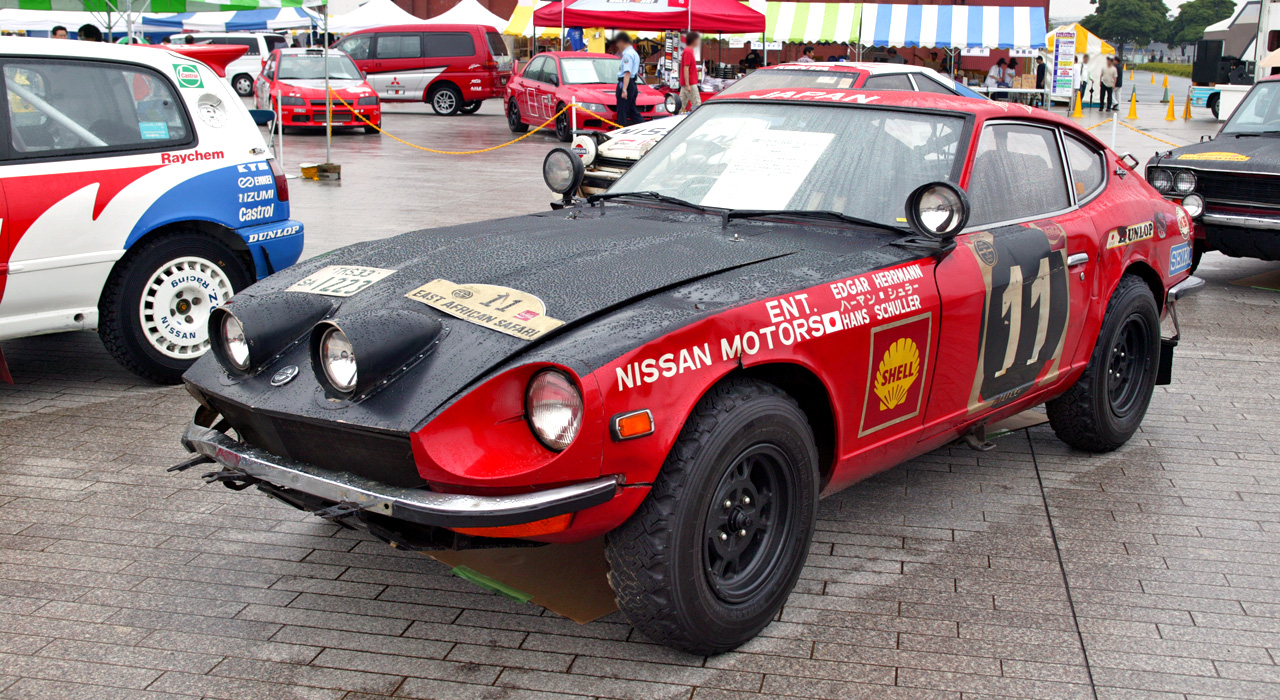
Herrmann's 1971 Safari -winning Datsun 240Z.

Edgar Herrmann (born 20 February 1932) is a German-born Kenyan former rally driver. He also competed in sports car racing, driving mainly a Porsche 911. Herrmann notably won the Safari Rally in Kenya both in 1970 and 1971. Sports Illustrated journalist Robert F. Jones described him as "a lean, hard-eyed operator (a resort hotel on the coast at Malindi; a car dealership in Nairobi)" and "a confident, competent man usually trailed by good-looking women."

== Career ==
Herrmann drove his Datsun P510 UWTK to fifth place at the 1969 Safari Rally, then known as the East African Safari Rally, after retiring with a Porsche 911 a year earlier. He went on to win the event twice when it became part of the International Championship for Manufacturers (IMC), in 1970 with a Datsun 1600 SSS and in 1971 with a Datsun 240Z. In 1972, he took his 240Z to fifth place. His IMC events outside his home country resulted in retirements, except for a 17th place at the 1971 RAC Rally.

After the World Rally Championship was established in 1973, Herrmann competed with his 240Z at the 1973 Safari Rally, retiring due to a broken head gasket, and with a Subaru GL at the 1973 Press-on-Regardless Rally, finishing in 14th place. However, he did win the non-WRC event Rallye Côte d'Ivoire that year. The following season, he took part in the Safari Rally in a Porsche Carrera RS but retired with an engine problem.

Herrmann went on to compete at the Safari Rally five more times. In 1976, he drove an Opel Kadett GT/E and in 1984 and 1985, a Mitsubishi Starion Turbo, retiring in all rallies. In 1982 and 1983, he co-drove for Swiss driver Hanspeter Ruedin in a Mitsubishi Lancer Turbo. The pair retired in 1982 and placed 13th in 1983.
