= Yamaha Jog =

Japanese scooter

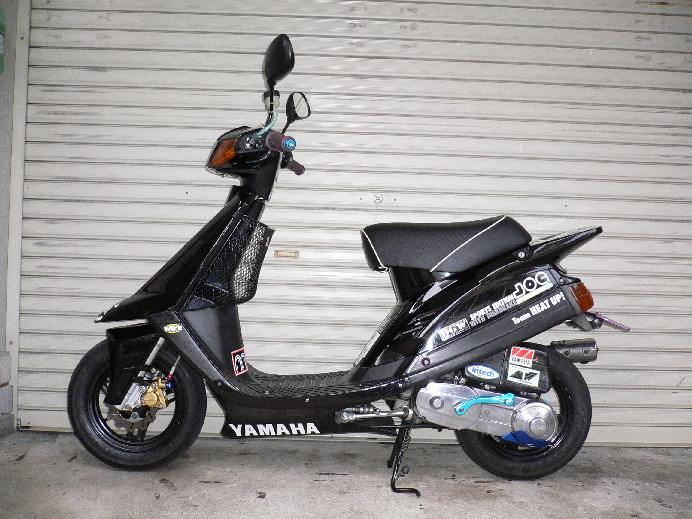
- Manufacturer: Yamaha Motor Corporation
- Production: 1983-2014
- Class: Scooter
- Engine: 49 cc (3.0 cu in) air-cooled two-stroke Minarelli single-cylinder
- Compression ratio: 7,3:1
- Ignition type: CDI
- Transmission: Continuously Variable Transmission

The Jog is a scooter produced by the Yamaha Motor Company since 1983, and was introduced in North America in 1986. It continued production in North America after 3 style changes and model designations (CE50, CG50 and CY50) until 2001. The Jog has continued production elsewhere in the world and uses the current CV50 designation.

== The Jog CE50 ==
For the first generation Jog, produced from 1986 to 1987, was actually part of the Riva family and in many areas was initially known as the Riva Jog. It was powered by an air-cooled two-stroke reed valve 49 cc (3.0 cu in) vertical Minarelli single-cylinder engine producing with 4.5 hp (3.4 kW) and 4.3 lb⋅ft (5.8 N⋅m) of torque. The top speed was 35–38 mph (56–61 km/h). For 1986 it came in red or yellow, and in 1987 it was red or blue.

== The Jog CG50 ==
In 1988 the Yamaha Jog was released after being completely restyled and carried the designation CG50. It was powered by a similar vertical Minarelli engine as the prior CE50 Jog, this engine uses a smaller crankshaft but most other parts are compatible. Color combinations included white/purple, red, and black. The CG50 was sold in North America from 1988 to 1991.

== The Jog CY50 ==
The final North American revision the CY50 was released in 1992 and had the longest production run of any of the Jogs, ending in 2001. It was a heavily restyled version of the CG50, but the engine was also changed from the air-cooled vertical Minarelli to the air-cooled 49 cc (3.0 cu in) horizontal Minarelli and the top speed was increased to 40 mph (64 km/h) in stock form. Unrestricted the CY50 was capable of 45–48 mph (72–77 km/h). The CY50 came in a wide assortment of colors.

The CY50 Jog seat was not suitable for two passengers.

== The Jog CV50 ==
The CV50 was released in 2006 as a successor to the CY50. The CV50 Jog still had the horiztonal Minarelli engine, but it saw a complete overhaul and redesign which took the CV50 away from a 'boxy shape' in favour of a more streamlined and 'curvy' shape. It was the first model of the jog family to feature a disk brake on the front, as all previous models used a drum setup front and back.
