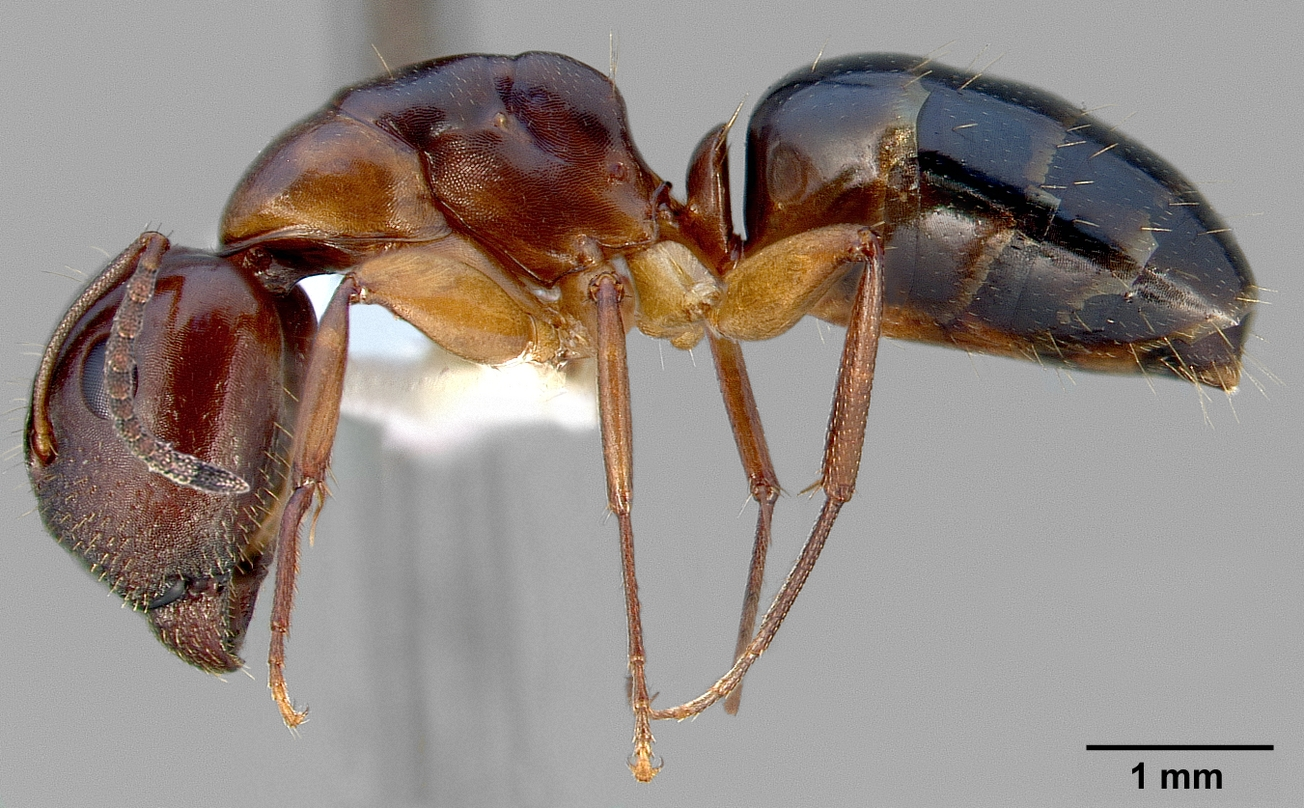

Scientific classification
- Domain: Eukaryota
- Kingdom: Animalia
- Phylum: Arthropoda
- Class: Insecta
- Order: Hymenoptera
- Family: Formicidae
- Subfamily: Formicinae
- Genus: Camponotus
- Subgenus: Camponotus
- Species: C. yogi

Binomial name
- Camponotus yogi Wheeler, W.M., 1915

Synonyms
- Colobopsis apostemata Mackay, 2018; Colobopsis cavibregma Mackay, 2018; Colobopsis yogi Wheeler, 1915

= Camponotus yogi =

Species of ant

Camponotus yogi is a species of carpenter ant native to California and Baja California.
