= Yogi (superyacht) =

Sunk motor yacht

M/Y Yogi was a motor yacht, finished in 2011 by the Turkish builder Proteksan Turquoise, at a length of 60.2 metres (198 ft) and price tag of US$39m. Designed by Jean Guy Verges and capable of accommodating up to 12 guests in 6 double cabins, with an owner's suite of 75 square metres (810 sq ft), she was the largest yacht ever registered under the French flag.

She sank on 17 February 2012 in the Aegean Sea, less than 20 nautical miles (37 km; 23 mi) off the coast of the Greek island of Skyros, while on her return voyage from warranty repairs at the builder's to France, after the crew of 8 had been safely evacuated.
