= David Doig (rally driver) =

Personal information
- Nationality: (Kenya) Kenyan
- Born: June 15, 1939; Kiganjo, Kenya
- Died: May 26, 2015 (aged 75); Kijabe, Kenya

World Rally Championship record
- Years active: 1973–1981
- Teams: Mitsubishi; Mercedes-Benz; Dodge
- Rallies: 8
- Championships: 0
- Rally wins: 2
- Podiums: 2
- Stage wins: 0
- First rally: 1973 Safari Rally
- First win: 1974 Safari Rally
- Last win: 1976 Safari Rally
- Last rally: 1981 Safari Rally

David Rodney Doig (15 June 1939 – 26 May 2015) was a rally co-driver from Kenya.

Born on the Doig family farm in Kiganjo, Doig scored his first World Rally Championship win at the 1974 Safari Rally with Joginder Singh. He made his debut in the 1973 event with Joginder's brother, Davinder. Singh and Doig won again in 1976.

He continued to appear regularly at the Safari Rally until 1981.

He died on 26 May 2015 in Kijabe after a short illness at the age of 75.
