= Joginder Singh (rally driver) =

Kenyan rally driver (1932–2013)

- Joginder Singh, pictured in London in the 1990s alongside the restored Volvo PV544 (KHT 184) with which he won the 1965 Safari Rally

Personal information
- Nationality: Kenya
- Born: 9 February 1932; Kericho, Kenya
- Died: 24 October 2013 (aged 81); London, England

World Rally Championship record
- Years active: 1973–1980
- Co-driver: (Kenya) Tim Samuels (Kenya) David Doig (United States) Parker Stevenson
- Teams: Mitsubishi, Mercedes-Benz
- Rallies: 8
- Rally wins: 2
- Podiums: 2
- Stage wins: 0
- Total points: 0
- First rally: 1973 Safari Rally
- First win: 1974 Safari Rally
- Last win: 1976 Safari Rally
- Last rally: 1980 Safari Rally

Sardar Joginder Singh Bhachu (9 February 1932 – 24 October 2013) was a successful Kenyan rally driver in the 1960s and 1970s. Popularly known as "The Flying Sikh", He won the Safari Rally three times, in 1965 driving a Volvo PV544 with his brother Jaswant as co-driver, and in 1974 and 1976 driving a Mitsubishi Colt Lancer 1600 GSR.

== Career ==
The eldest of ten children born to Sardar Battan Singh and Sardarni Swaran Kaur, first generation Kenyan Asian migrants from the Punjab region of India, he was educated at a boarding school in Nairobi. His first work experience was as a spanner boy in his father's garage, and he gained further experience as a mechanic in other organisations before becoming the Royal East African Automobile Association's first patrolman in 1958.

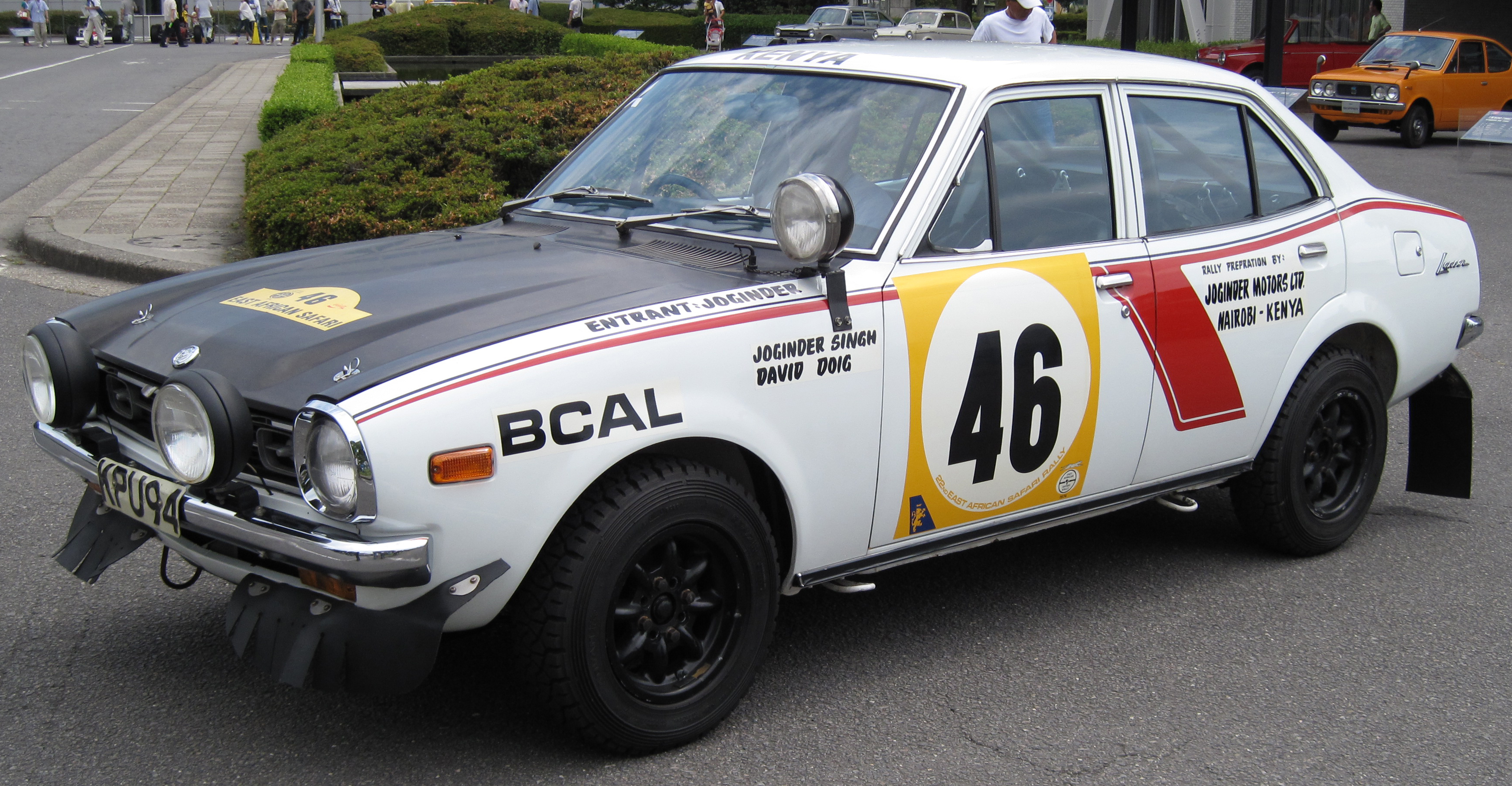
Singh's 1974 Safari Rally winning Lancer

The first Sikh driver ever to win an international rally, and also the first man to win the Safari Rally three times, he was fondly known as the "Flying Sikh" for his exploits behind the wheel. Although Ugandan rival Shekhar Mehta has more outright victories in the event, Singh's record of 19 finishes in 22 attempts is an unprecedented feat of consistency in what has been long regarded as the world's toughest rally, where the attrition rate can exceed 90%. He was even one of the so-called "Unsinkable Seven" – the only crews in the 1968 event who were able to reach the finish at Nairobi when the rest of the entire field of 74 were stranded on the Mau Escarpment along the western rim of the Great Rift Valley.

He had no motorsport experience until he was 26, but made up for his late start by eventually accumulating over sixty wins in the East African Rally Championships in Kenya, Uganda and Tanzania. Aside from his three wins on the Safari Rally, he also scored three top five finishes in the Southern Cross Rally in Australia in the 1970s, and was twice awarded Kenya's Motor Sportsman of the Year title (1970, 1976).

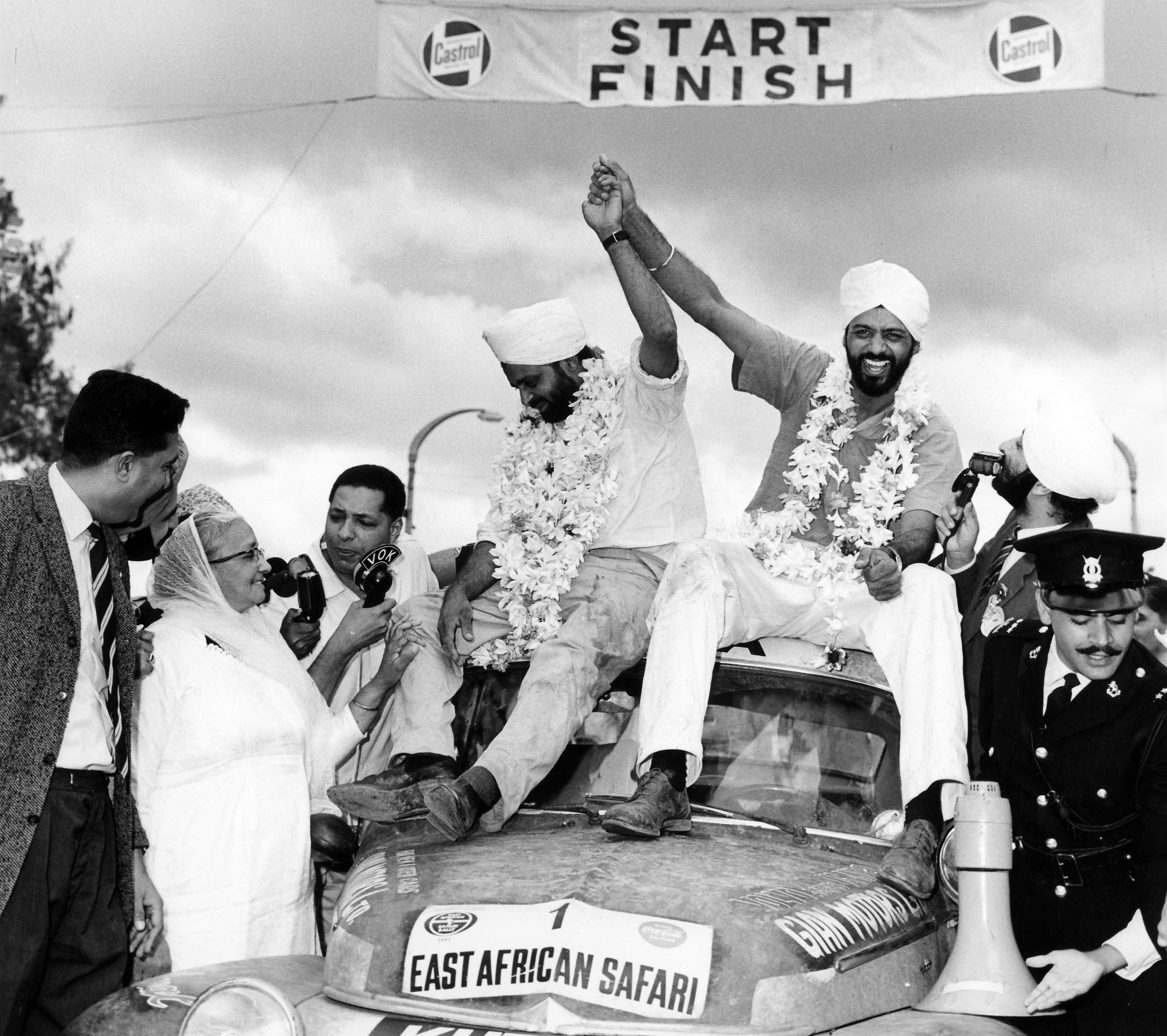
The Singh brothers wins the 1965 East African Safari Rally

His historic first Safari win in 1965 proved to be a triumph against expectations and a defiance of superstition. It was the 13th running of the event, and his car was given the number 1 which was at that time considered an unlucky number in the Safari. Nevertheless, there was only good fortune for Joginder and Jaswant, despite piloting the same Volvo which factory driver Tom Trana had used in the 1964 Safari and which had clocked up 42,000 competitive miles on its odometer before the Bhachu brothers' victory.

He spent many years as a resident in the United Kingdom from the 1980s and lived in Canada. He was present as a guest at the opening of the 50th running of the Safari Rally in 2002, and was appointed patron of the Safari Classic for 2007.

Joginder Singh died of heart failure in London on Sunday 20 October 2013, he was aged 81.

== Flying Sikh ==
Singh was called the Flying Sikh in a book by Roger Barnard, Peter Moll, which was illustrated by Mohamed Amin. Published by TransAfrica Publishers in 1975, this 109-page book gives an account of his early life. An article in the Daily Nation quotes the book describing Singh's father as his inspiration.

== WRC victories ==
#	Event	Season	Co-driver	Car
1	(Kenya) 22nd East African Safari Rally	1974	David Doig	Mitsubishi Colt Lancer
2	(Kenya) 24th Safari Rally	1976	David Doig	Mitsubishi Lancer 1600 GSR

== Racing record ==
=== Complete IMC results ===
Year	Entrant	Car	1	2	3	4	5	6	7	8	9
1970	Nissan Motor Company Ltd.	Datsun 1600 SSS	MON	SWE	ITA	KEN; 2	AUT	GRE	GBR		
1971	Ford Motor Company Ltd	Ford Escort TC	MON	SWE	ITA	KEN; 16	MAR				
1971	VW Porsche Austria	Volkswagen Käfer 1302 S						AUT; Ret	GRE	FRA	
1971	Withers of Winsford	Ford Escort RS1600									GBR; Ret
1972	Ford Motor Company Ltd	Ford Escort RS1600	MON	SWE	KEN; Ret	MAR	GRE	AUT	ITA	USA	GBR

=== Complete WRC results ===
Year	Entrant	Car	1	2	3	4	5	6	7	8	9	10	11	12	13	WDC	Pts
1973	Simba Motors Ltd.	Mitsubishi Colt Galant	MON	SWE	POR	KEN; 11	MOR	GRE	POL	FIN	AUT	ITA	USA	GBR	FRA	N/A	N/A
1974	Joginder Singh	Mitsubishi Lancer GSR	POR	KEN; 1	FIN	ITA	CAN	USA	GBR	FRA						N/A	N/A
1975	Joginder Singh	Mitsubishi Colt Lancer	MON	SWE	KEN; Ret	GRE	MOR	POR	FIN	ITA	FRA	GBR				N/A	N/A
1976	Joginder Singh	Mitsubishi Lancer 1600 GSR	MON	SWE	POR	KEN; 1	GRC	MOR	FIN	ITA	FRA	GBR				N/A	N/A
1977	Dia Start International Co.	Mitsubishi Colt Lancer	MON	SWE	POR	KEN; 5	NZL	GRC	FIN	CAN	ITA	FRA	GBR			N/A	N/A
1978	D.T. Dobie & Co (EA) Ltd	Mercedes 280 E	MON	SWE	KEN; Ret	POR	GRE	FIN	CAN	ITA	CIV	FRA	GBR			N/A	N/A
1979	American Sports Sales / Daimler-Benz	Mercedes 280 E	MON	SWE	POR	KEN; 11	GRC	NZL	FIN	CAN	ITA	FRA	GBR	CIV		NC	0
1980	American Sports Sales / Daimler-Benz	Mercedes 450 SLC	MON	SWE	POR	KEN; 14	GRC	ARG	FIN	NZL	ITA	FRA	GBR	CIV		NC	0
