= Bert Shankland =

Bert Shankland (12 September 1932 - 26 January 2012) was an East African Safari Rally driver and champion from Scotland. He worked in Tanzania from the 1950s to the 1970s. He won the Safari rally twice in 1966 and 1967 driving Peugeot 404s.

Bert Shankland (1932–2012)

Nationality: British (Scottish)

Occupation: Rally Driver, Automotive Technician, Managing Director

Known for: Two-time winner of the East African Safari Rally (1966, 1967)

Early Life and Career

Bert Shankland was born in Glasgow, Scotland, in 1932. He moved to Dar es Salaam, Tanganyika (now Tanzania), in 1958 to work as a technician for Ridoch Motors. His relocation marked the beginning of his long association with East Africa, where he lived and worked for most of his life.

Shankland began his motorsport career in East Africa, competing in regional rallies primarily with Ford cars. Between 1958 and 1962, he took part in several editions of the East African Safari Rally, then known as the Coronation Safari Rally, managing to finish on a few occasions despite the event’s notorious difficulty.

Association with Peugeot

In 1963, Shankland joined Tanganyika Motors, the Peugeot dealership in Dar es Salaam, after being recruited by its director, James Feeney, who also had rally experience. Shankland was appointed service manager and began competing with Peugeot vehicles. This partnership proved highly successful and marked a turning point in his racing career.

East African Safari Rally Success

Driving for Tanganyika Motors, Shankland achieved his greatest successes in the East African Safari Rally, one of the world’s toughest motorsport events. He won the rally in consecutive years, 1966 and 1967, with co-driver Chris Rothwell, driving a Peugeot 404 (registration number TDN 5).

These victories were particularly notable as they were achieved by a privately entered team competing against factory-backed entries from manufacturers such as Ford. The wins established Shankland as a leading figure in East African rallying and brought international recognition to Peugeot’s reliability and endurance.

Subsequent Performances

Following his double victory, Shankland continued to compete in the Safari Rally and other regional events throughout the 1970s. Although he did not secure further wins, he maintained a consistent record of top-ten finishes:

- 1970 – 3rd place (with Chris Rothwell)
- 1971 – 3rd place (with Chris Bates)
- 1972 – 9th place
- 1974 – 7th place
- 1975 – 5th place
- 1976 – 4th place (with Brian Barton)
- 1977 – 7th place
- 1980 – 11th overall, 1st in class (Peugeot 504)

His 1970 performance is often regarded as one of his finest. Despite Tanzania’s withdrawal from the event and restrictions on local participation, Shankland and Rothwell entered a Group 1 Peugeot 504 and finished third overall, outperforming several factory-prepared Group 2 vehicles.

Professional Career and Later Life

Beyond racing, Shankland advanced within Tanganyika Motors, eventually becoming its Managing Director. He retired from the company in 1987.

After retirement, Shankland returned to Scotland, where he lived until his death. He died in Glasgow on 26 January 2012, aged 79, after a long illness. He was buried in Perth, Scotland.

He was survived by his wife, Margaret, and two sons, Scott and Neil.

Legacy

Bert Shankland is regarded as one of East Africa’s most accomplished rally drivers. His achievements contributed significantly to the popularity of motorsport in the region during the 1960s and 1970s. His consecutive Safari Rally victories in a privately entered Peugeot remain among the most respected feats in the event’s history.

Sources:
- Website RallyBase by Tjeerd van der Zee, page http://www.rallybase.nl/index.php?type=profile&driverid=6617 .
- Website IPPMedia, article "Bert Shankland to be buried on Friday in Perth" by Mohammed Ugasa, published on 01 February 2012, page http://www.ippmedia.com/frontend/index.php?l=38021 .
- Website AUTOSPORT → Forums → The Nostalgia Forum, thread "1960s rally ace Bert Shankland dies in Scotland, Rest in peace", posting by "404KF2", message http://forums.autosport.com/index.php?showtopic=160822&view=findpost&p=5507031 .
- Website eWRC-Result.com by Tomáš "Shacki" Wanka, page https://www.ewrc-results.com/profile/45172-bert-shankland/ .
