= Lofty Drews =

Kenyan rally co-driver (born 1940)

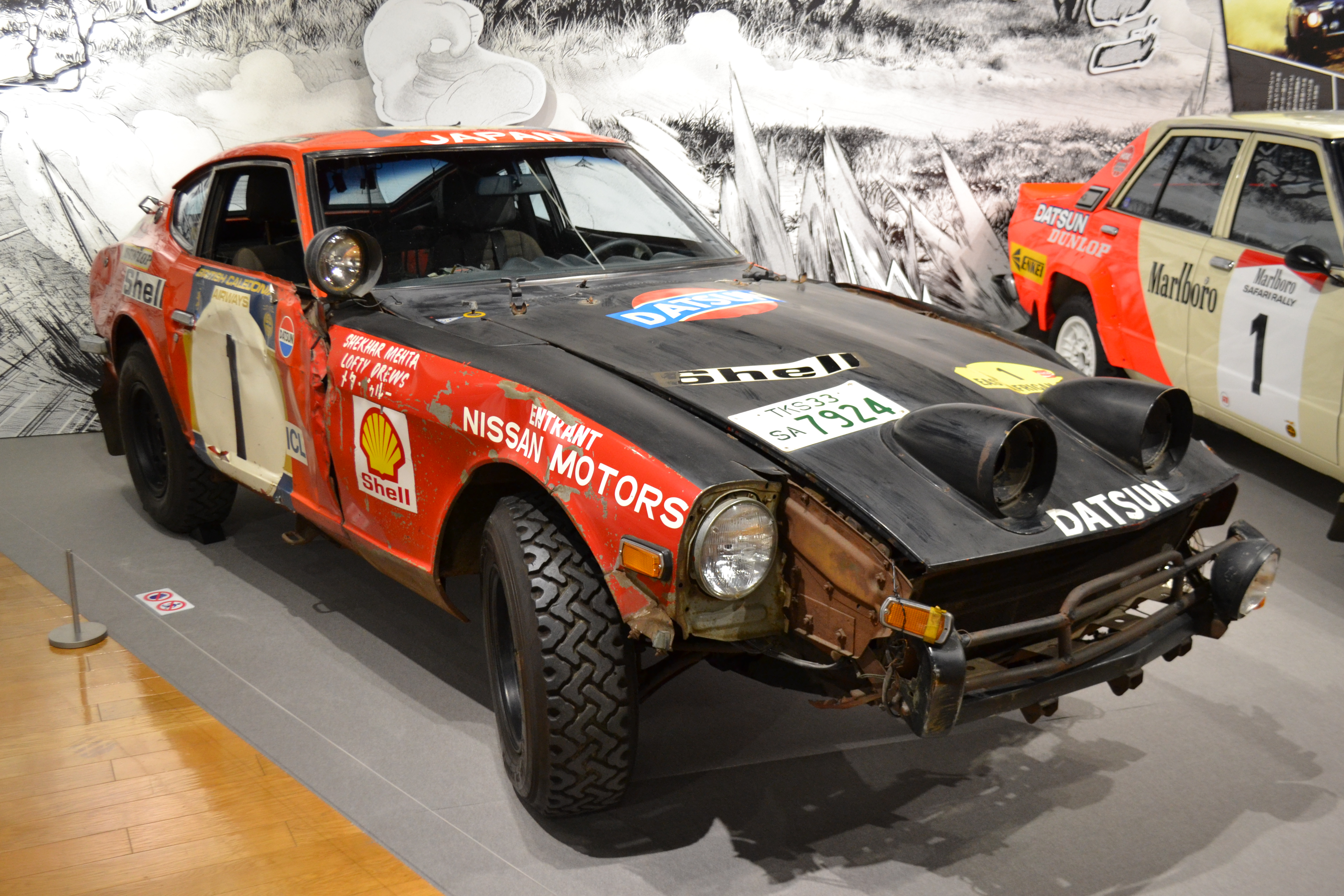
- 1973 Safari Rally-winning Datsun 240Z of Mehta and Drews

Personal information
- Nationality: (Kenya) Kenyan
- Born: 16 July 1940 (age 86); Tanga, Tanganyika

World Rally Championship record
- Years active: 1973–1975, 1977–1991, 1996
- Driver: (Kenya) Shekhar Mehta (Italy) Sandro Munari (Finland) Rauno Aaltonen (Tanzania) Shah Jayant (Austria) Sepp Haider (Australia) George Kahler (Australia) Graham Vaughan
- Teams: Datsun, Lancia, Opel
- Rallies: 21
- Championships: 0
- Rally wins: 1
- Podiums: 8
- First rally: 1973 East African Safari Rally
- First win: 1973 East African Safari Rally
- Last win: 1973 East African Safari Rally
- Last rally: 1996 Rally Australia

Lofty Drews (born 16 July 1940) is a former rally co-driver from Kenya.

== Biography ==
Born in Tanga, Tanzania, Drews scored his first World Rally Championship win at the 1973 Safari Rally with Shekhar Mehta. Afterwards, he achieved further success with both Sandro Munari and Rauno Aaltonen, and finished on the podium at the event seven more times.

Drews continued to appear regularly at the Safari Rally until 1990.
