= Unsinkable =

Unsinkable may refer to:

- a quality of ships and vessels, achieved through compartments

== Film and television ==
- Unsinkable (film), a 2024 film about the RMS Titanic
- Unsinkable, a 2021 episode from Ninjago: Seabound
- Unsinkable I.R., a 1998 episode from I Am Weasel
- The Unsinkable Molly Brown (film), a 1964 American Metrocolor musical comedy film
- The Unsinkable Molly Brown (musical), a 1960 musical

== See also ==
- Margaret Brown (1867–1932), American socialite and philanthropist, posthumously known as the 'Unsinkable Molly Brown'
- Unsinkable Sam, a ship's cat who purportedly served during World War II
- Unsinkable Seven, a nickname given to the seven drivers who managed to survive to finish the East African Safari Rally
- Unsinkable aircraft carrier, a term used to refer to a geographically or politically important island
