= Arya Kanya Gurukul =

Coordinates: 21°39′23″N 69°36′53″E

Arya Kanya Gurukul situated at Porbandar, Gujarat, is a girls K-12 boarding school in India.

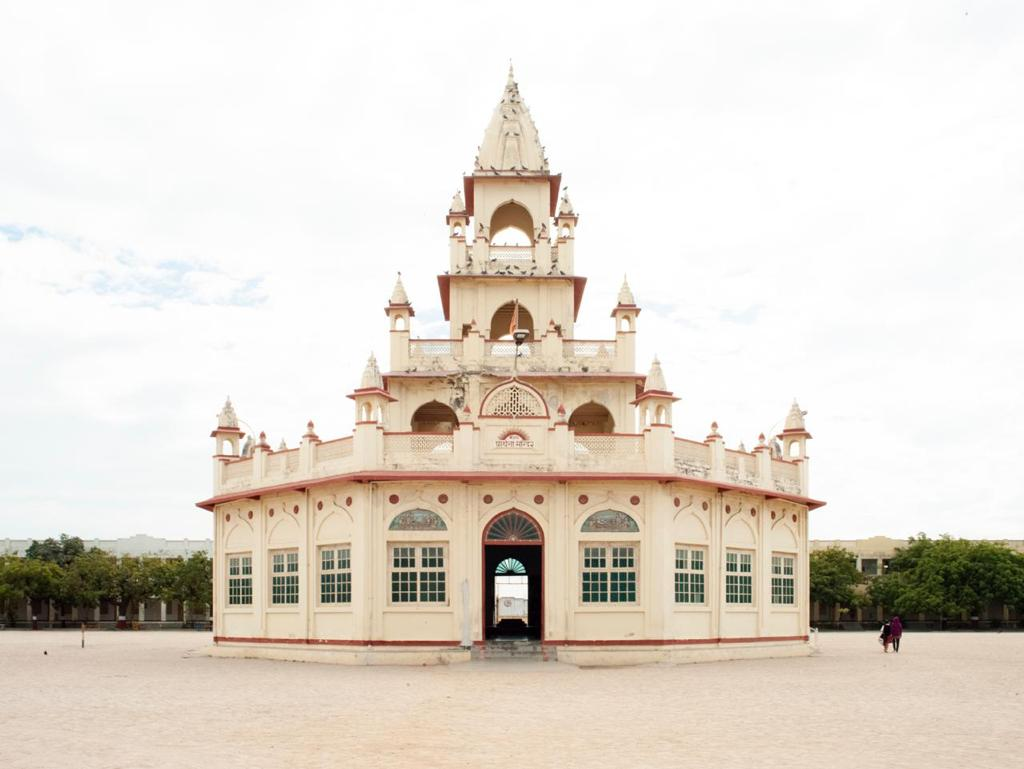
Prarathna Mandir forms the heart of the campus at Arya Kenya Gurukul. Students gather here daily to recite prayers, an essential component of their holistic education

== History ==
The school was set up in 1936 by Gujarati industrialist and philanthropist, Shri Nanji Kalidas Mehta, the founder of Mehta Group. A deep association with Gandhiji and inspired by the Arya Samaj leaders led to the founding of the school.

Nanji Kalidas was deeply influenced by Mahatma Gandhi and principle of Arya Samaj and he therefore made foundation stone of Gurukul to be laid by a Scheduled Caste girl, a revolutionary step in those times. The school have been visited by dignitaries like Dr. Rajendra Prasad, Dr. Radhakrishnan, Giani Zail Singh, Pt. Jawaharlal Nehru, Smt. Indira Gandhi, Shri Morarji Desai, Shri Rajiv Gandhi, Smt. Sonia Gandhi and more recently, the President Mrs. Pratibha Patil.

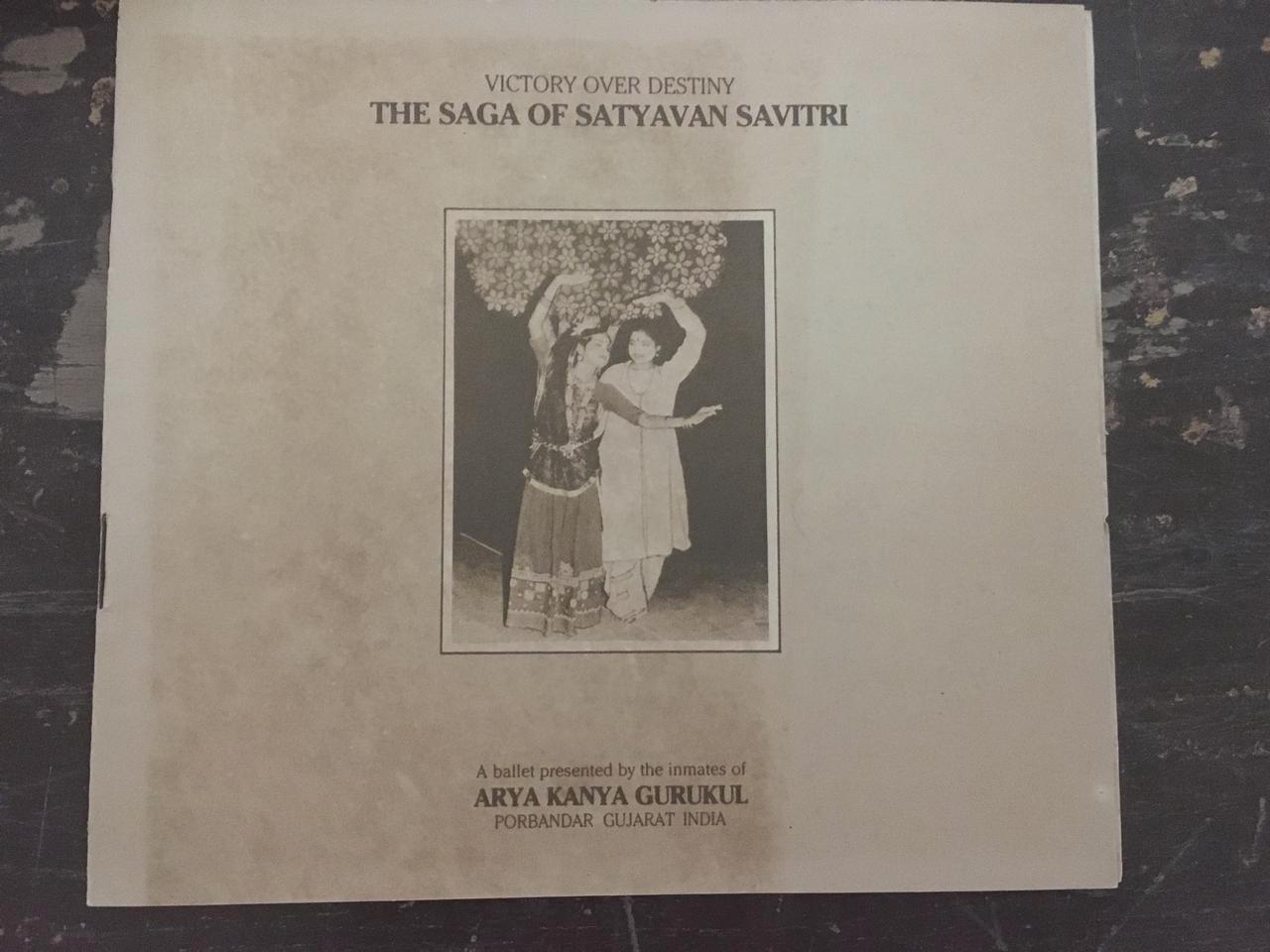
A booklet of one the school's dance drama productions. Dr Savitaben Mehta was instrumental in making possible international exposure for the girl students.

Arya Kanya Gurukul equips girls to lead fulfilled and purposeful lives by providing an all-round education based on Vedic values.

== Ideology of Gurukul ==
Guru in Sanskrit means teacher and kul translates as domain. The Gurukul system is an ancient system of education where students live with their teacher or Guru who would guide their holistic development - the mind, body and spirit. The relationship of a guru and his shishya or pupil is a hallowed concept in Hinduism.

Nanji Kalidas Mehta was a firm believer in women's education and felt a dire need for development in this area in Saurashtra. He felt educating the girl child would help the balanced growth of a society and the growth of a family. The Arya Kanya Gurukul welcomes girls from all walks of life and social strata.

The education system at Gurukul is a blend of Vedic heritage and modern educational systems with an orientation towards science and technology based on Arya Samaj principles.

== Campus ==
The school complex is set amidst 90 acres of sylvan surroundings on the fringes of the city between the Arabian Sea and the blue Barda Hills. Every morning, 900 girls gather in the Prarthana Mandir to recite their daily prayers and perform the 'yajna', a religious ceremony that harks back to Vedic times.

== Dr. Savitaben 'Didiji' Mehta ==
Once Sheth Nanji Kalidas Mehta had established this much needed educational institution, a need was felt for someone responsible to head the institution. His eldest daughter volunteered and made it her lifelong mission to achieve success and excellence for Arya Kanya Gurukul. The success of the institution, the respect and fame it commands in the region was largely due to her work in the foundational decades. With her drive, dedication and her deep knowledge of the classical languages, philosophy and Indian culture, she was largely responsible for the school's impeccable reputation and fore fronting women's education in the area.

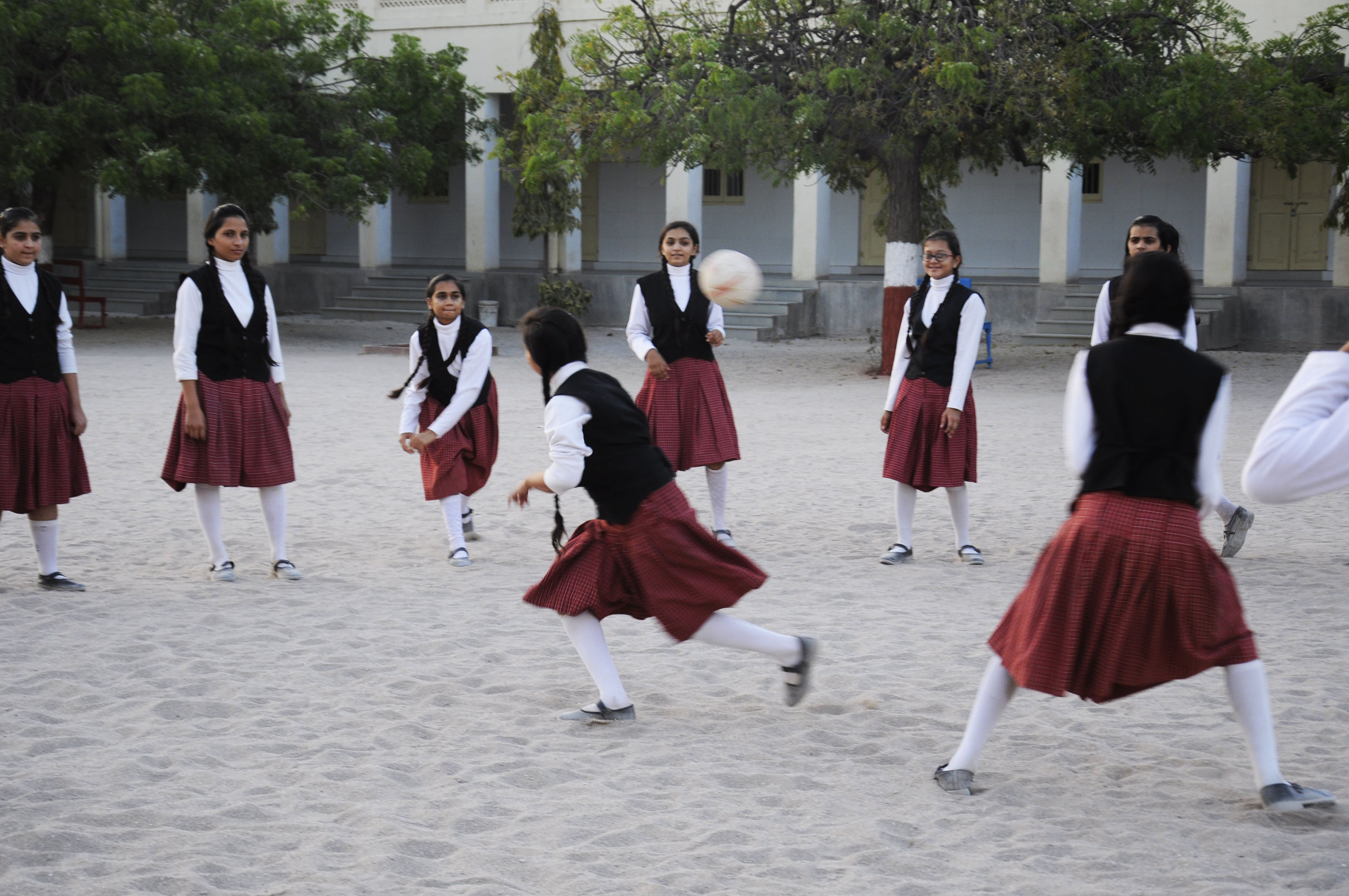
Students at Gurukul play on campus.
