= Unsinkable Seven =

Unsinkable Seven was a nickname given to the seven drivers and co-drivers who managed to survive to finish the notoriously difficult East African Safari Rally that began and ended in Kenya, in the unusually difficult rallies of 1963 and 1968.

Inaugurated in 1953, the rally's notoriously tough conditions required cars to be adapted to cope; despite this, it made it popular with factory teams. From the 1960s onward, they travelled from as far as Japan and Europe to compete.

Courses lasting 3,100 miles to the finish line made the rally a challenge to complete, sometimes made worse by adverse weather conditions. The "Unsinkable Seven" nickname was awarded on two occasions, in 1963 and 1968, when a number of mishaps were caused by heavy rainfall, both before and during the rally. Also exclusion for a number of reasons including lateness and disqualification, meant that a large number of competitors had to retire. So only 8% finished, making it the lowest rate ever. Alternatively, the competitors are nicknamed "The Magnificent Seven".

== Overview ==
The idea of the rally began in 1950 when a pair of Nairobi businessmen, Neil and Donald Vincent, who recently had set a new record at the Nairobi – Cape Town – Nairobi run, were approached by their cousin Eric Cecil, who was a chairman of the motorsport committee of the REAAA, to race at the 3.3 mile Langa Langa (now known as Gilgil) circuit that was made up of perimeter roads of a World War II military camp. The Vincents were unenthusiastic at the idea as they had grown tired of circuit racing but were interested in the idea of a long-distance driving event similar to the one in which they had competed the previous year. Cecil considered a road race around Lake Victoria but shelved the idea when he realised that parts of northern Tanzania, where the race would be likely to take place, were prone to seasonal flooding, making that idea impractical.

Eventually various ideas began to gel together forming the basis of the rally that was to be run over roads in the three African Great Lakes nations of Kenya, Uganda and Tanzania. This idea became a reality in 1953 when it was staged over the holidays as the East African Coronation Safari, a celebration of the coronation of Queen Elizabeth II.

Overseas interest grew from the 1959 rally, with entrants from the British motoring press. By the following year, the Safari was filmed for British television stations; by then over one hundred overseas journalists covered the event.

Factory teams and drivers soon began to arrive, and the likes of the future husband and wife Pat Moss and Erik Carlsson competed in the event.

With a course of 3,100 miles of bush road varying in elevation from sea level to 7,000 feet over a short period of days, that tested the limits of drivers and co-drivers and their machines with very little chance of a rest in between stages.

The rally has sometimes been marred by flooding during a thunderstorm period, meaning route changes were necessary even before the start. Flooding also made the rally far more difficult with normally treacherous roads becoming booby traps with unseen and terrifying hazards.

Each stage gave either large or small cars a disadvantage. The High altitudes of up to 9,000 feet above sea level gave a disadvantage to small cars as it robbed them of power, requiring altitude correctors to the carburettor main jet to maintain the correct air/fuel mixture to the engine.

With flooding on the course, roads turned to mud, giving a disadvantage to larger cars as they slipped, slithered and ground to a halt on tracks where the rain and dust had combined to turn the roads into a sea of bottomless mud that saw cars bogged down to ground level. Many of the competitors resorted to using snow chains on their tyres, some of those stuck to their normal tyres instead of the snow tyres favoured by competitors.

The deep treads of snow tyres offered more grip in the mud, but required more power. Many of the Volkswagen Beetle drivers favoured normal tyres as the car offered better traction in the mud.

As a result, for those who were less fortunate, competitors got themselves trapped in the Mau Escarpment along the western rim of the Great Rift Valley.

In 1960, it was renamed the East African Safari; in 1965 the "Rally" tag was added and kept that name until 1974, when it became the Safari Rally; by that time it was awarded a World Rally Championship status. Until 1970, Nairobi was the rally's start and finish point.

== 1963 ==
11th East African Safari Rally
- Host country: Kenya, Uganda and Tanganyika

Statistics
- Crews: 7 at finish

Overall results
- Overall winner: (Kenya) Nick Nowicki

The 1963 running of the rally, taking place between 11 and April 15, was significant as it was included for the first time as a qualifying round for the RAC's World Rally Championship. It was –yalso significant as Japanese factory teams (Nissan and Hino) made their debut there, which in the forthcoming years played a significant part in the rally; it also had the strongest contingents of factory teams at the time. With the demise of the Liège–Sofia–Liège Rally the previous year, the Safari was beginning to establish itself as the toughest rally on the calendar.

Eighty-four cars of ninety-one registered entrants started the rally that ran on a 3,100 mile route through Kenya, Uganda and Tanganyika over three days and four nights.

With dry parts of the road earlier in the rally, Erik Carlsson comfortably led the rally earlier, leading the local Nick Nowicki in a Peugeot 404 by three minutes at Kampala and extending it over another local, Beau Younghusband, by half an hour at Nairobi until he ran into an ant bear at Mbulu, requiring repairs but retaining a fifteen-minute lead over Younghusband at Dar es Salaam. Carlsson's Saab 96 later succumbed to those damages, breaking a driveshaft. Younghusband's Ford Cortina began to lose oil and retired with a seized engine. By then the rally was marred by torrential downpours and floods causing chaos for competitors.

The factory Ford team lost all their Cortinas – Moss, Anne Hall and Bert Shankland – as soon they entered Tanganyika. The Ford Anglia of Peter Hughes was to take the lead, but got stuck in the mud for 50 minutes and had to be helped out by eventual winner Nowicki, leaving himself to finish second.

Amongst the factory drivers, Rauno Aaltonen participated in his second Safari with Tony Ambrose in a Morris 1100. They were amongst the top finishers until mud filled up the wheel arches of their car, effectively eliminating them.

The factory Nissan Bluebird of Takashi Wakabayashi (who later managed the factory rally team, instrumental in its successes in the 1970s) and Yasuharu Nanba (who became the first president of the newly merged Nismo in 1984) were also casualties of the rally.

The pairing of Bill Bengry and Gordon Goby was the only non-African team to finish. Only seven of the 84 starters who struggled back to the finish line lasted until the end and were awarded the nickname "Unsinkable Seven"; only 8% of those who started completed the rally, making it the record lowest rate ever.

Pos.	Driver	Co-driver	Car	Class	Points
1.	(Kenya) Nick Nowicki	(Kenya) Paddy Cliff	Peugeot 404	E	185
2.	(Kenya) Peter Hughes	(Kenya) William Young	Ford Anglia	C	264
3.	(Kenya) Jim Cardwell	(Kenya) David Lead	Mercedes-Benz 220 SEb	F	267
4.	(Kenya) Joginder Singh	(Kenya) Jaswant Singh	Fiat 2300	F	290
5.	(Kenya) Hugh Lionnet	(Kenya) Ian Philip	Peugeot 404	E	304
6.	(Kenya) J.S. Bathurst	(Kenya) Ian Jaffray	Peugeot 403 Sept	C	346
7.	(United Kingdom) Bill Bengry	(United Kingdom) Gordon Goby	Rover P5	G	408

== 1968 ==
16th East African Safari Rally

Statistics
- Crews: 7 at finish

Overall results
- Overall winner: (Kenya) Nick Nowicki

After a dry rally the previous year, the rally began as usual at Nairobi, then to Uganda before returning to Nairobi around Mount Elgon, then to Mount Kenya. The southern loop went through Mombasa, then south of Dar es Salaam, then back to Nairobi.

Like it was five years earlier, it was chaos again with a thunderstorm anticipated; also the rains broke out six weeks earlier than expected and turned the route into one of the toughest and most hazardous ever, leading the organisers to extend the maximum lateness from four to eight hours.

President Jomo Kenyatta came to flag away the first cars of the rally.

Pat Moss in her Renault 16 retired when she crashed into a stone barrier erected by locals in Uganda. Timo Mäkinen rolled his BMC 1800 before he reached Uganda; teammate Aaltonen, although he placed third at Kampala, failed to reach Nairobi. Rally leader Vic Preston in a semi-factory Ford Cortina Mk. II was excluded for missing passage control. Meanwhile, Joginder Singh in a factory Datsun Cedric led the twenty-one survivors but fell to fifth after engine problems slowed him down. Howard Lawrence-Brown in his Triumph 2000 regained the lead at Mombasa but by the time he reached Dar es Salaam, German born local Peter Huth in his Cortina overtook him.

By the time the competitors reached Kiroka Pass, the chaos of previous years began when one of these sections was a path that was messed up by lorries, making crossing difficult, meaning that the rally leader Huth required an hour and a half to cover 20 miles and all others required more time for the same section.

By the time he came to a flooded river to wait for the water to subside, he lost his lead as all others caught up with him. Nick Nowicki in his Peugeot 404 took the lead with Bert Shankland in the same car behind, but his car suffered from a split sump, sustained from a damaged steering earlier on with the crew topping up oil; this meant with just three controls to go, the engine gave up. Hugh Lionet in his Peugeot 204 was excluded for fixing a mud flap at the parc fermé. Shekhar Mehta in his debut Safari driving in the same car also retired.

As seven of those finished, the nickname was given to the group again; amongst those, only Nowicki and Singh were awarded it twice. Joginder Singh's co-driver, Briton Richard Bensted-Smith, was the only non-African to finish in this edition. Lucille Cardwell and Geraldine Davies' seventh and last place finish in this edition made them both the only women and the only all-female team to earn the Unsinkable Seven nickname. At that rate of those who finished, only 8% completed the rally, matching the 1963 record for the highest attrition rate of finishers.

Pos.	Driver	Co-driver	Car	Class	Points
1.	(Kenya) Nick Nowicki	(Kenya) Paddy Cliff	Peugeot 404 Injection	C	686
2.	(Kenya) Peter Huth	(Kenya) Ian Grant	Lotus Cortina	C	708
3.	(Kenya) Kim Mandeville	(Kenya) Stuart Allison	Triumph 2000	C	752
4.	(Kenya) Mike Armstrong	(Kenya) Derek Paveley	Peugeot 404 Injection	C	774
5.	(Kenya) Joginder Singh	(United Kingdom) Richard Bensted-Smith	Nissan Cedric	C	904
6.	(Kenya) Robin Ullyate	(Kenya) Michael Wood	Ford Cortina GT	C	904
7.	(Tanzania) Lucille Cardwell	(Kenya) Geraldine Davies	Nissan Cedric	C	1158

== Aftermath ==
Until 1972, no foreign drivers won the rally until Hannu Mikkola broke through the African stranglehold. With the exceptions of Shekhar Mehta and Joginder Singh who dominated the 1970s and early 1980s, no other Africans managed to win the rally, with the exception of Ian Duncan in 1994, until the rally lost its WRC status in 2003 due to lack of funding and organisation but became part of the FIA organised African Rally Championship.

Following the 1968 rally, no other editions could match the record of attrition rate of finishers with the fewest being ten cars (17%) in 1990, amongst fifty-nine starters.

The 1968 rally was the last to be held in Tanzania due to political problems with the local government later in the year when they ruled that the rally was not permitted to enter into their territory.
