= Shekhar Mehta =

Kenyan rally driver (1945–2006)

Personal information
- Nationality: (Kenya) Kenyan
- Born: 20 June 1945; Lugazi, Uganda
- Died: 12 April 2006 (aged 60); London, England

World Rally Championship record
- Years active: 1973–1987
- Co-driver: (Kenya) Lofty Drews (United Kingdom) Geraint Phillips (Finland) Ensio Mikander (United Kingdom) Keith Wood (Kenya) Mike Doughty (United Kingdom) Martin Holmes (United Kingdom) Robert Bean (Kenya) Yvonne Mehta (United Kingdom) Henry Liddon (Kenya) Rob Combes
- Teams: Datsun, Lancia, Opel, Nissan, Audi, Peugeot
- Rallies: 47
- Rally wins: 5
- Podiums: 11
- Stage wins: 13
- Total points: 229
- First rally: 1973 Safari Rally
- First win: 1973 Safari Rally
- Last win: 1982 Safari Rally
- Last rally: 1987 Rallye Côte d'Ivoire

Chandrashekhar Khimjibhai Nanji Kalidas Mehta (20 June 1945 – 12 April 2006) was a Ugandan-born Kenyan rally driver. He won the Safari Rally a record five times (1973, 1979–82), including four consecutively, and in 1981 finished fifth in the World Rally Championship.

== Biography ==
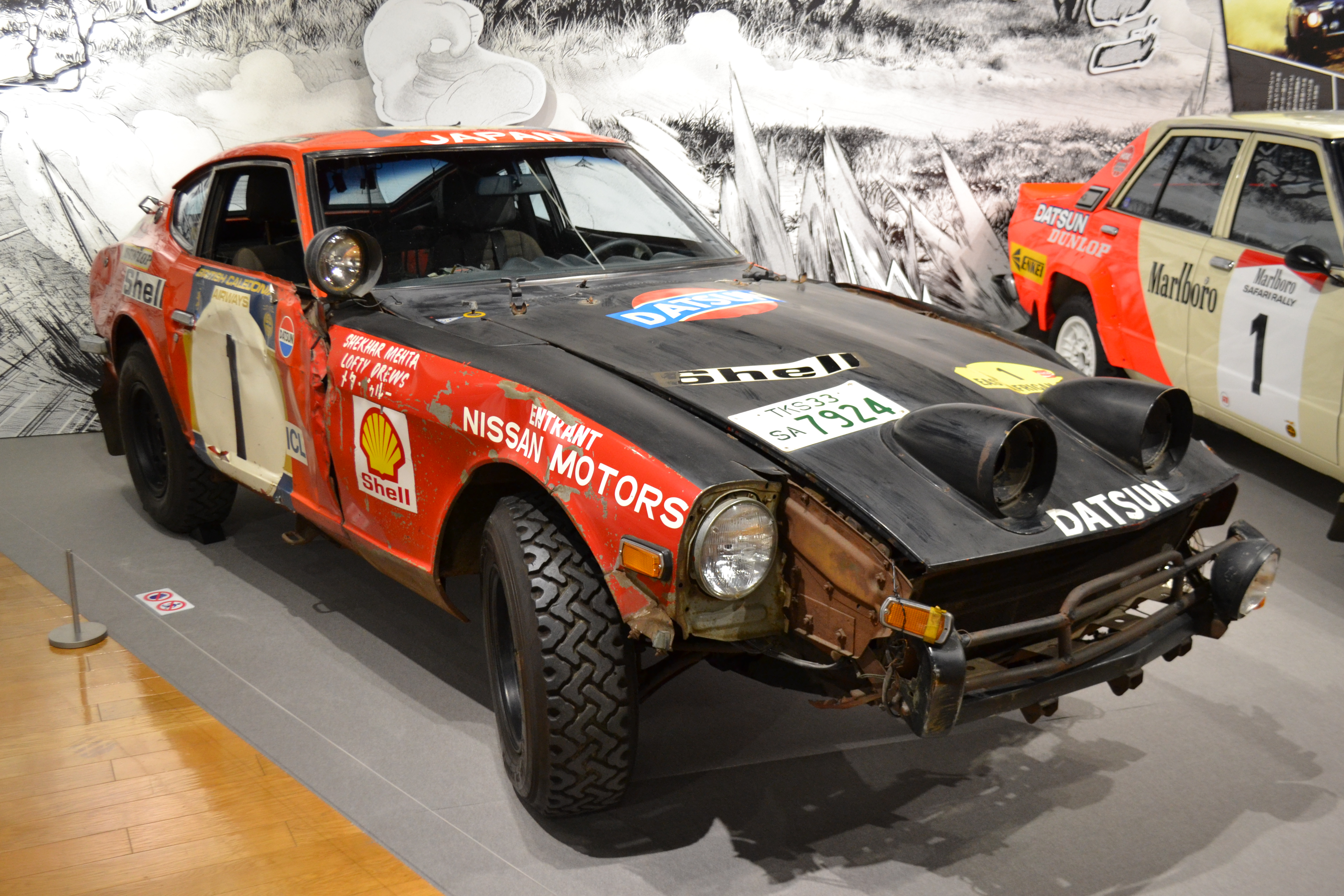
Mehta's 1973 Safari Rally-winning Datsun 240Z

A Ugandan of Indian Gujarati descent, he was born in 1945 to a family of plantation owners in Uganda, and began rallying behind the wheel of a BMW aged 21. In 1972, he and his family fled Idi Amin's regime to Kenya, the year before he clinched his first Safari Rally title.

He was born into a wealthy business family, the son of Khimji Mehta and the grandson of Nanji Kalidas Mehta, founder of the Mehta Group. He was the cousin of Indian businessman, Jay Mehta who is the head of the Mehta Group. He married his former co-driver Yvonne Pratt in 1978 after a ten-year courtship, and they had one son, Vijay, in 1980.

Through the most successful period of his career, he drove Datsun cars. He won the inaugural African Rally Championship in 1981, and the Cyprus Rally in 1976. He was on the podium at the 1981 Rally Codasur, twice at the Acropolis Rally and three times at the Rallye Côte d'Ivoire. His career came to an end in 1986 after a near-fatal crash at the Rallye des Pharaons in Egypt, where he drove a Peugeot.

After his driving days were over he held various administrative positions at the FIA. He became president of the FIA Rally commission in 1997, and was re-appointed as interim President of the World Rally Championship commission shortly before his death. He died in London on 12 April 2006 from liver problems, hepatitis, and illness relating to complications from an old injury.

== Racing record ==
=== Complete IMC results ===
Year	Entrant	Car	1	2	3	4	5	6	7	8	9
1970	Shekhar Mehta	Datsun 1600 SSS	MON	SWE	ITA	KEN; Ret	AUT	GRE	GBR		
1971	Nissan Motor Co. Ltd.	Datsun 240Z	MON	SWE	ITA	KEN; 2	MAR	AUT	GRE	FRA	
1971	Nissan Europe Rally Team	Datsun 240Z									GBR; 19
1972	Nissan Motor Co. Ltd.	Datsun 240Z	MON	SWE	KEN; 10	MAR					
1972	Sears Roebuck Ltd	Datsun 240Z					GRE; 6	AUT	ITA	USA	
1972	Withers of Winsford	Datsun 240Z									GBR; Ret

=== Complete WRC results ===
Year	Entrant	Car	1	2	3	4	5	6	7	8	9	10	11	12	13	WDC	Points
1973	Nissan Motor Co. Ltd.	Datsun 240Z	MON	SWE	POR	KEN; 1	MOR; Ret	GRE	POL	FIN; Ret	AUT	ITA	USA			N/A	N/A
1973	Datsun UK Ltd	Datsun Sunny												GBR; 37	FRA	N/A	N/A
1974	Lancia Marlboro	Lancia Fulvia Coupé HF	POR	KEN; 11	FIN											N/A	N/A
1974	Lancia Marlboro	Lancia Beta Coupé				ITA; 4	CAN	USA	GBR	FRA						N/A	N/A
1975	Lancia Alitalia	Lancia Beta Coupé	MON	SWE	KEN; Ret	GRC										N/A	N/A
1975	Datsun Dealers	Datsun 160J					MOR; 6									N/A	N/A
1975	Shekhar Mehta	Datsun Violet 160J						POR; 7	FIN	ITA	FRA	GBR				N/A	N/A
1976	D.T. Dobie & Co (EA) Ltd	Datsun 160J	MON	SWE	POR	KEN; Ret										N/A	N/A
1976	N.I. Theocharakis	Datsun 160J					GRC; 3	MOR	FIN	ITA	FRA	GBR				N/A	N/A
1977	D.T. Dobie & Co (EA) Ltd	Datsun 160J	MON	SWE	POR	KEN; Ret	NZL	GRC	FIN	CAN	ITA	FRA	GBR			N/A	N/A
1978	D.T. Dobie & Co (EA) Ltd	Datsun 160J	MON	SWE	KEN; Ret	POR										N/A	N/A
1978	N.I. Theocharakis	Datsun 160J					GRC; 3	FIN	CAN	ITA						N/A	N/A
1978	Opel Euro Händler Team	Opel Ascona i2000									CIV; Ret	FRA	GBR			N/A	N/A
1979	D.T. Dobie / Team Datsun	Datsun 160J	MON	SWE	POR	KEN; 1	GRC	NZL	FIN	CAN	ITA	FRA	GBR	CIV		10th	20
1980	D.T. Dobie / Team Datsun	Datsun 160J	MON	SWE	POR	KEN; 1										9th	30
1980	Nissan Motors	Datsun 160J						ARG; 4	FIN	NZL	ITA	FRA	GBR			9th	30
1980	Comafrique	Datsun 160J												CIV; Ret		9th	30
1980	Opel Euro Händler Team	Opel Ascona 400					GRC; Ret									9th	30
1981	D.T. Dobie / Team Datsun	Datsun Violet GT	MON	SWE	POR	KEN; 1	FRA									5th	55
1981	Ma. Ma. Sa.	Datsun Violet GT							ARG; 2							5th	55
1981	Shekhar Mehta	Datsun Violet GT								BRA; Ret	FIN	ITA				5th	55
1981	Comafrique	Datsun Violet GT											CIV; 3	GBR		5th	55
1981	N.I. Theocharakis	Datsun 160J						GRC; 5								5th	55
1982	D.T. Dobie & Co	Nissan Violet GT	MON	SWE	POR	KEN; 1	FRA									8th	30
1982	N.I. Theocharakis	Nissan Violet GT						GRC; Ret								8th	30
1982	Dealer Team Nissan	Nissan Violet GT							NZL; Ret							8th	30
1982	Shekhar Mehta	Nissan Violet GTS								BRA; Ret	FIN	ITA	CIV	GBR		8th	30
1983	D.T. Dobie & Co	Nissan 240RS	MON	SWE	POR	KEN; Ret	FRA									9th	26
1983	N.I. Theocharakis	Nissan 240RS						GRC; 6								9th	26
1983	Dealer Team Nissan	Nissan 240RS							NZL; 4							9th	26
1983	Audi Sport	Audi Quattro A2								ARG; 4	FIN	ITA	CIV	GBR		9th	26
1984	Subaru Motor Sports	Subaru Leone 1800	MON; 14	SWE	POR											9th	27
1984	D.T. Dobie & Co	Nissan 240RS				KEN; 5	FRA									9th	27
1984	N.I. Theocharakis	Nissan 240RS						GRC; 7	NZL	ARG	FIN	ITA				9th	27
1984	Shekhar Mehta	Nissan 240RS											CIV; 3			9th	27
1984	Team Nissan Europe	Nissan 240RS												GBR; 8		9th	27
1985	D.T. Dobie & Co	Nissan 240RS	MON	SWE	POR	KEN; Ret	FRA									13th	20
1985	N.I. Theocharakis	Nissan 240RS						GRC; 4								13th	20
1985	Nissan New Zealand	Nissan 240RS							NZL; Ret							13th	20
1985	Shekhar Mehta	Nissan 240RS								ARG; 4	FIN	ITA	CIV	GBR		13th	20
1986	Peugeot Talbot Sport	Peugeot 205 Turbo 16 E2	MON	SWE	POR	KEN; 8	FRA	GRE	NZL	ARG	FIN	CIV	ITA	GBR	USA	49th	3
1987	Nissan Motorsports International	Nissan 200SX	MON	SWE	POR	KEN; Ret	FRA	GRC; Ret	USA; 8	NZL	ARG	FIN	CIV; 2	ITA	GBR	18th	18

Sporting positions
Preceded by inaugural	African Rally Champion; 1981	Succeeded by Walter Röhrl
