= Mike Doughty (co-driver) =

Kenyan rally co-driver (1936–2025)

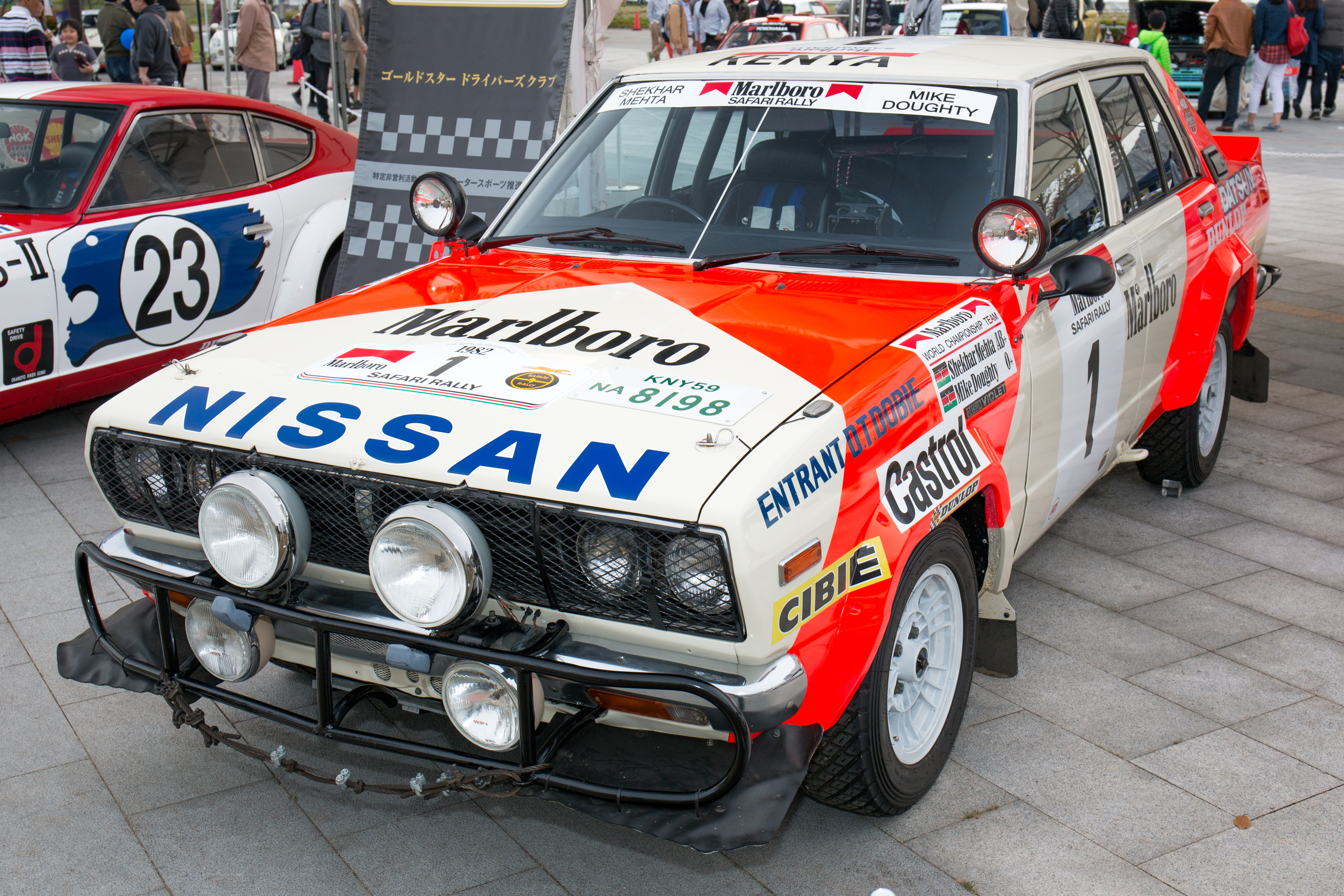
- 1982 Safari Rally-winning Nissan Violet GT of Mehta and Doughty

Personal information
- Nationality: (Kenya) Kenyan
- Born: 2 December 1936; Tanga, Tanganyika Territory
- Died: 19 May 2025 (aged 88); Nairobi, Kenya

World Rally Championship record
- Years active: 1973–1987
- Driver: (Kenya) Jack Simonian (Kenya) Shekhar Mehta (Kenya) Vic Preston Jr (Kenya) Basil Criticos (Tanzania) Shah Jayant (Kenya) Mike Kirkland (Kenya) Frank Tundo (Italy) Andrea Zanussi
- Teams: Lancia, Datsun, Opel, Mercedes-Benz, Nissan
- Rallies: 21
- Championships: 0
- Rally wins: 4
- Podiums: 5
- First rally: 1973 East African Safari Rally
- First win: 1979 Safari Rally
- Last win: 1982 Safari Rally
- Last rally: 1987 Acropolis Rally

Mike Doughty (2 December 1936 – 19 May 2025) was a Kenyan rally co-driver. He was best known for competing with Shekhar Mehta in the 1970s. Doughty died in Nairobi on 19 May 2025, at the age of 88.
