= Jay Mehta =

Indian businessman (born 1961)

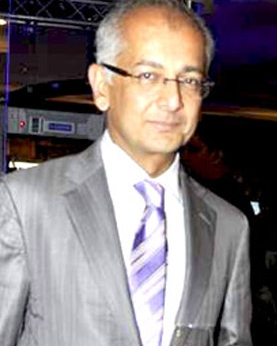
- Mehta in 2010
- Born: Jay Mahendra Mehta; 18 January 1961 (age 65); India
- Education: Columbia University (BS); International Institute for Management Development (MBA)
- Occupation: Businessman
- Organization(s): Indian operations (Mehta Group); Saurashtra Cement Ltd. and Gujarat Sidhee Cement Ltd. ADF Foods Ltd.
- Spouses: Sujata Birla (died 1990) Juhi Chawla (m. 1995)
- Children: Jhanvi Mehta
- Relatives: Nanji Kalidas Mehta (grandfather); Shekhar Mehta (cousin)

Jay Mahendra Mehta (born 18 January 1961) is an Indian businessman. He is the son of Sunayana and Mahendra Mehta and grandson of Nanji Kalidas Mehta, who owned the Mehta Group which is spread over Africa, India, Canada and the United States. His cousin is late Kenyan race car driver, Shekhar Mehta. He is married to actress Juhi Chawla.

== Education ==
In 1983, Mehta received his BS in engineering from the Fu Foundation School of Engineering and Applied Science at Columbia University in New York City. In 1991 he earned an MBA from the International Institute for Management Development in Lausanne, Switzerland.

== Business interest ==
Mehta owns the Mehta Group, a multinational company. Mehta owns two companies in India:

- Saurashtra Cement Ltd (Ranavav near Porbandar, Gujarat)
- Gujarat Sidhee Cement Ltd (Veraval Gujarat India)

Along with actor Shahrukh Khan, he is a co-owner of the Indian Premier League team Kolkata Knight Riders.

== Personal life ==
Jay Mehta is the husband of former Miss India and Bollywood actress Juhi Chawla. He was earlier married to Sujata Birla, sister of Yash Birla who died in the Flight 605 plane crash in 1990. Mehta has two children with wife Juhi Chawla, a daughter, Jahnavi Mehta (born 2001) and a son, Arjun Mehta (born 2003).
