= Nanji Kalidas Mehta =

Indian industrialist

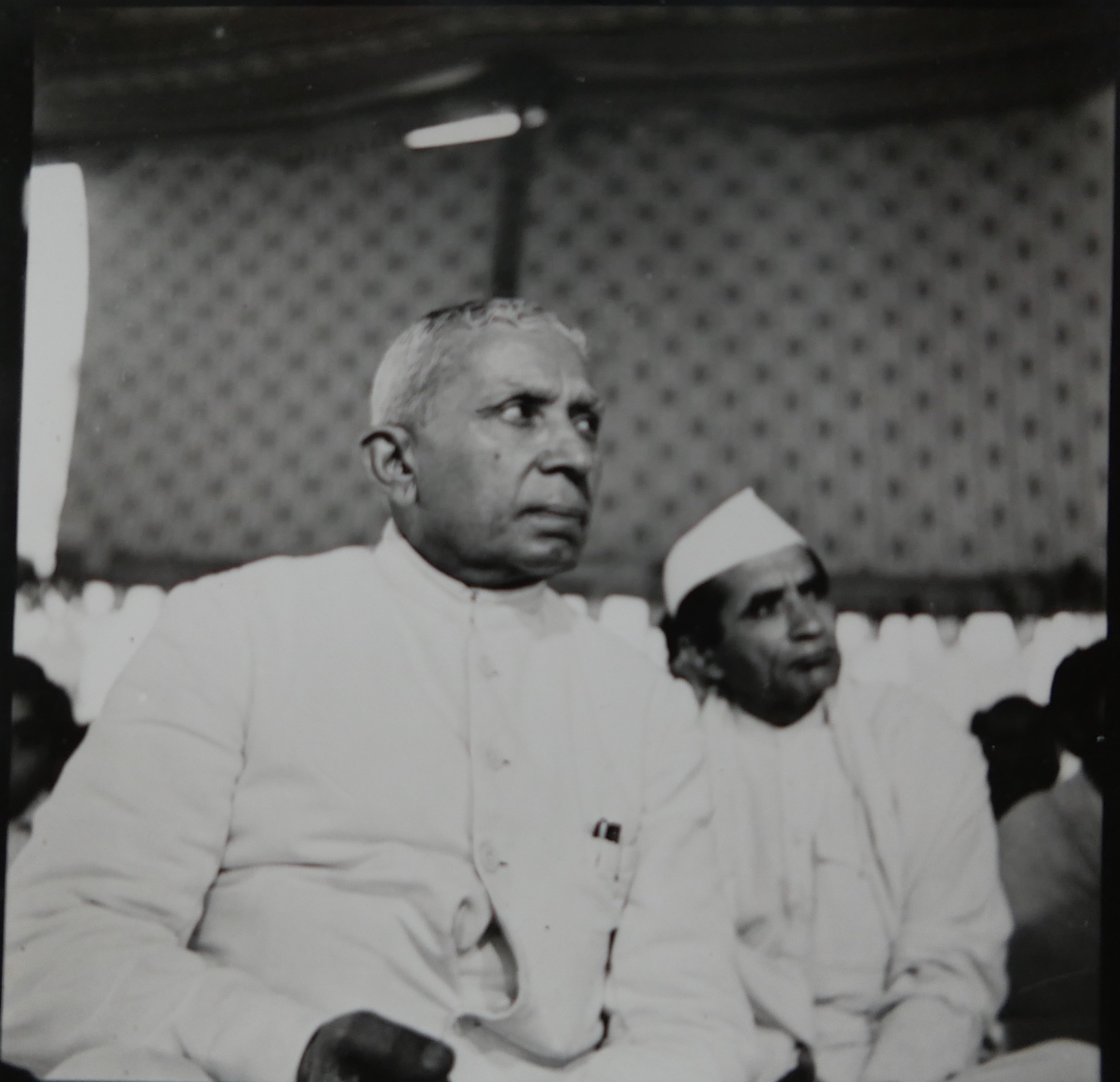
- Nanji Kalidas Mehta
- Born: 17 November 1887; Gorana, Porbandar State, British India
- Died: 25 August 1969 (aged 81); Porbandar, Gujarat, India
- Occupations: Industrialist; Philanthropist
- Organization: Mehta Group
- Spouse: Santoshben Mehta
- Children: 5
- Relatives: Jay Mehta (grandson); Shekhar Mehta (grandson)

Nanji Kalidas Mehta, Raj Ratna, MBE (17 November 1887 – 25 August 1969) was an Indian industrialist and philanthropist from Gujarat. He founded the Mehta Group in British East Africa, with its head office in India. Known as Sheth Nanjibhai. His son Mahendra Mehta, daughter in-law Sunayana Mehta and grandson Jay Mehta now own the Mehta Group.

== Personal life ==
Mehta was born on 17 November 1887 in Gorana village, near Porbandar in the Princely State of Porbandar, British India. He was born in a Gujarati Hindu family of Lohana caste. He left for East Africa at the age of thirteen in 1900. He married young and his second marriage was to Santoshben Mehta and they had four children - 'Didiji' Savitaben Mehta, Dirubhai Mehta, Nirmala Mehta nee Khatau and Mahendra Mehta (born 1932 in Porbandar). Shekhar Mehta, the sports car driver, and Jay Mehta, the businessman, are his grandsons.

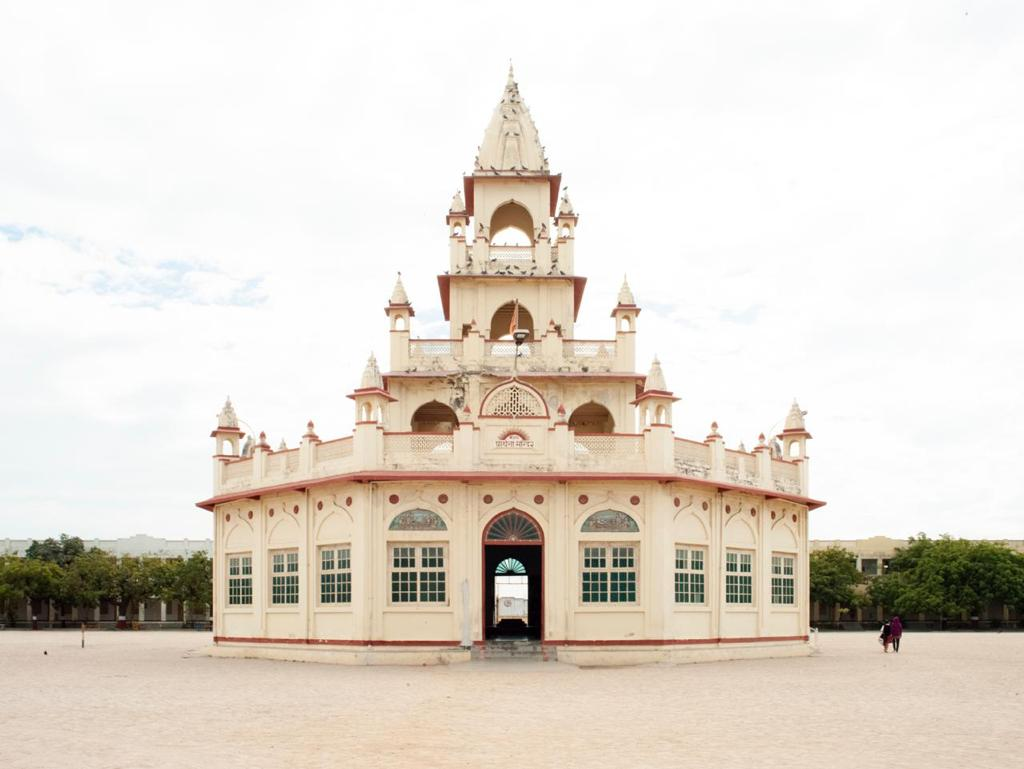
The Arya Kanya Gurukul was established in 1937 and was Nanjibhai's long cherished dream.

Mehta was a follower of the Hindu reform sect of Arya Samaj. As an active member of the sect, he was instrumental in starting many Arya Samaj affiliated schools, colleges, and temples in East Africa as well as India.

== Business career ==
He started his career as a trader and ventured into growing vegetable, cotton and then sugarcane in British East Africa. Later he ventured in to sugar manufacturing, tea and coffee plantations in that region.At Port Mashindi on the River Nile, Uganda he started the Hoima Cotton Company. He in his later life also started a Cement plant, ginneries, a textile unit and oil mills in India. He thus founded the Mehta Group conglomerate, which is now spread across the globe.

He was contemporary of some other Gujarati businessmen and philanthropists of East Africa such as Meghji Pethraj Shah, Muljibhai Madhvani and others. On the original building of Muljibhai Madhvani's office in Jinja, Nanjibhai's name still appears as DUKA YA KALIDASI, a mark of their friendship.

He established the present day Sugar Corporation of Uganda Limited under the name Uganda Sugar Factory in 1924 at Lugazi. He was one of the first exporters of Uganda's cotton to Japan and other places which greatly helped in the establishment of the cotton industry in Uganda.

In 1932, he established a cotton mill named Maharana Mills in Porbandar, the land for which was given at a measly sum by Maharana Natwarsinhji of Porbandar. The company employed 2500 workers at time of Indian independence in 1947. Nanjibhai was an Arya Samaji and was instrumental in giving Scheduled Caste the jobs in spite of protests by Brahmins. Again it was for breaking the strike in this Maharana Mills, Nanjibhai is said to have employed services of Devu and Karsan Vagher in late 1960s. In 1956 he established Saurashtra Cement Limited in Gujarat.

The happy girls working in Maharana Mills at Probandar used to sing in his praise:

Nanji's lamp burns in Japan
Nanji Seth is lamp of our heart

== Later life and death ==
In 1966, he published his Autobiography named Dreams half expressed, where he mentions,

"The way to success is a hard road to travel. Disappointments and failures dishearten us in the midst of struggle but a man of enterprise has to pass through the period with patience and cheerfulness till he gets his well deserved returns."

He died on 25 August 1969 at Porbandar in India. At his demise, the Sheriff of Bombay, Shri S. M. Dahanukar held a Public Meeting to condole his death at the Bhulabhai Desai Auditorium, Bombay on Tuesday, 28 October 1969.

== Honours ==
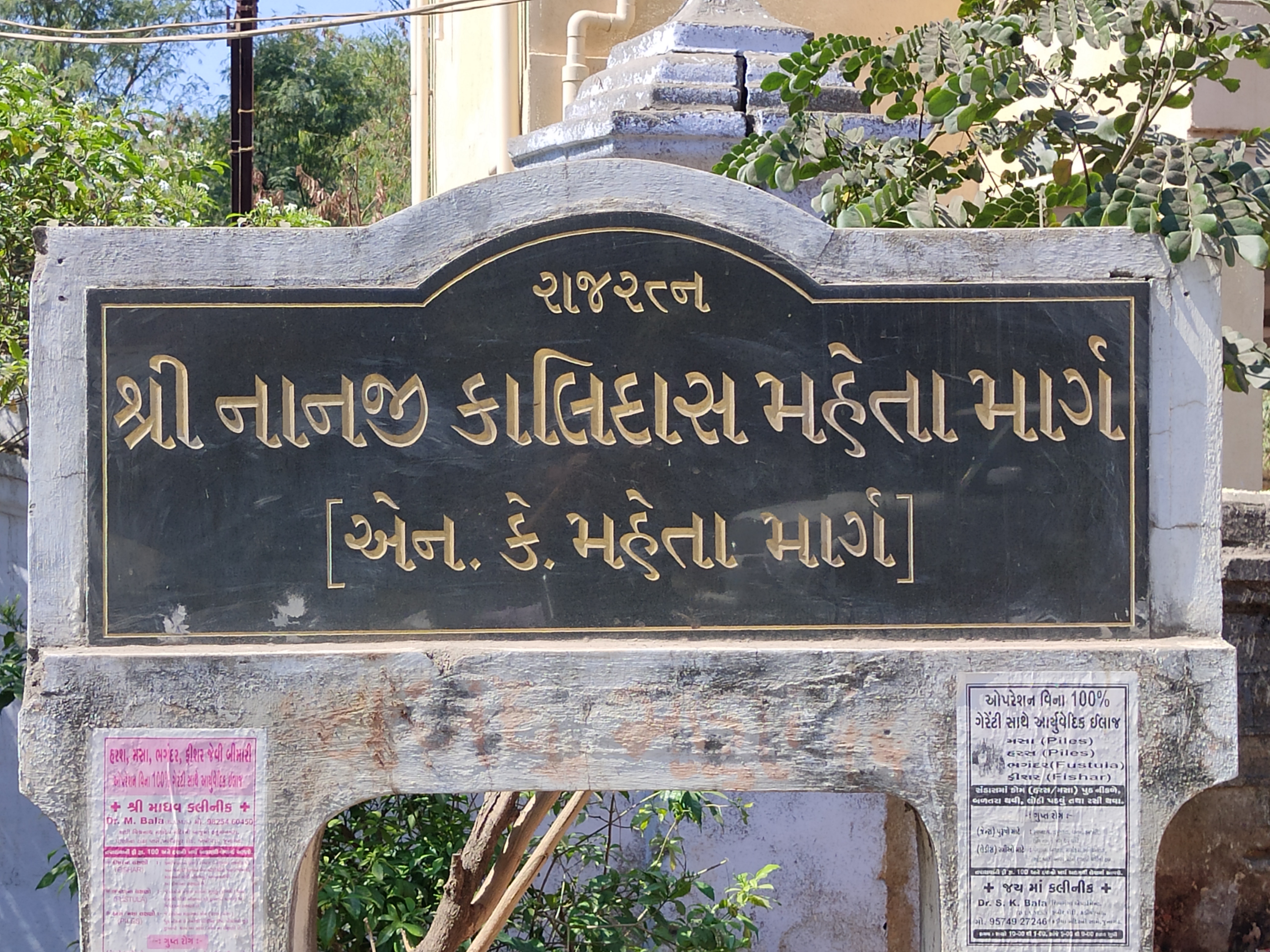
Nanji Kalidas Mehta Marg in Junagadh, Gujarat

Mehta was awarded an M.B.E. by Britain for his work in Uganda. He was also given the title of Raj Ratna of Porbandar State by H.H. Maharana Sri Natwarsinhji and a title of Dhrama Ratna (defender of faith) by the poet, Kaka Kalelkar.

In Uganda, upon his death, the flag flew at half mast.

A road in Junagadh is named after him. A road in Porbandar is named after him.

== Philanthropist ==
=== India ===
- Kirti Mandir at Porbandar, which houses the ancestral house of Mahatma Gandhi and a memorial/temple built in memory of Mahatma Gandhi and Kasturba, was mainly built due to efforts and money donated by Nanji Kalidas Mehta. He convinced Gandhiji to sell his ancestral house to a trust created by him, so that they can preserve it as a memorial.
- Arya Kanya Gurukul, a Girls Resident School was started by him in 1936.
- In 1954, he donated a plot of land at Haridwar for Gujarati Dharamshala of which he also was a trustee, it is now named Nanji Kalidas Mehta Dharamshala.
- Arya Samaj Girls School and College / Gurukul Women's College of Arts and Commerce was started by him in 1956 at Porbandar.
- He built the Maharshi Dayanand Science College and donated it to the Education Society of Porbandar and named it after Swami Dayanand Saraswati, to keep people alive the memory of the founder of Arya samaj.
- Jawahralal Nehru Planetarium also called Tara Mandir was started by him in Porbandar, being the first in Western India. The planetarium has a gallery dedicated to Quit India Movement.
- The Bharat Mandir at Porbandar is a unique edifice housing the cultural history and heritage of the country in paintings and in quotes on the surrounding walls and pillars and with a relief map of India in the centre.
- In 2006 the Shri Santokba Vidyamandir was inaugurated in memory of Santokba, the wife of Nanjibhai, under the auspices of the Arya Kanya Vidyalaya Trust at Porbandar.
- N.K. Mehta Hospital in Probandar.
- N.K. Mehta Science College in Probandar.
- Rokadiya Hanuman Temple at Probandar, which is now a tourist attraction of town.
- At Bombay, the N. K. Mehta International House, a building built by Brihad Bharatiya Samaj, a non-political society designed for educational, social and economical interest of Indians abroad was built with a major donation from Nanji Kalidas Mehta. The building houses a library, research wing, auditorium and hostel.
- Rest Houses and Dharamshalas at Junagadh, Girnar, Haridwar

After his demise, the following institutions have been named as his memorials:-

- Nanji Kalidas DAV Public School at Junagadh is named after him.
- Nanji Kalidas DAV Public School at Veraval is also named after him.
- Recently, Jai Mehta, grandson of Nanji Kalidas and husband of Juhi Chawla along with Shah Rukh Khan, who together are co-owners of Kolkata Knight Riders have decided to take over existing ground named Duleep cricket ground at Porbandar and develop it into a world class cricket stadium, which will be named Nanji Kalidas Mehta Stadium.

=== Uganda ===
- The Mehta Group founded by him runs a hospital at Lugazi and various dispensaries and runs 2 Nursery Schools, 13 Primary Schools and 1 Secondary School to provide education for more than 6,000 children in various cities like Kampala, Jinja, Lugazi, etc.
- Arya Girls School at Kampala.
- Town Hall, Mehta Library and Jubilee Park at Kampala.
- The opening of The Desai Memorial Hall built with donations dedicated to Manilal Ambalal Desai was done by Nanji Kalidas Mehta in 1934. The foundation stone of it was laid with hands of Sarojini Naidu in 1929.

=== Kenya ===
- He started the very first nursery school in East Africa at Mombasa, which was founded in 1934. The school was named Santokben Nanji Kalidas Mehta Nursery School. In 2006 the Mehta Group completely renovated, refurbished the school.
- Arya Girls School at Nairobi

=== Tanzania ===
- Arya Samaj Temple at Dar-es-Salaam
- Women's Association Hall at Dar-es-Salaam.
