= Peugeot 404 =

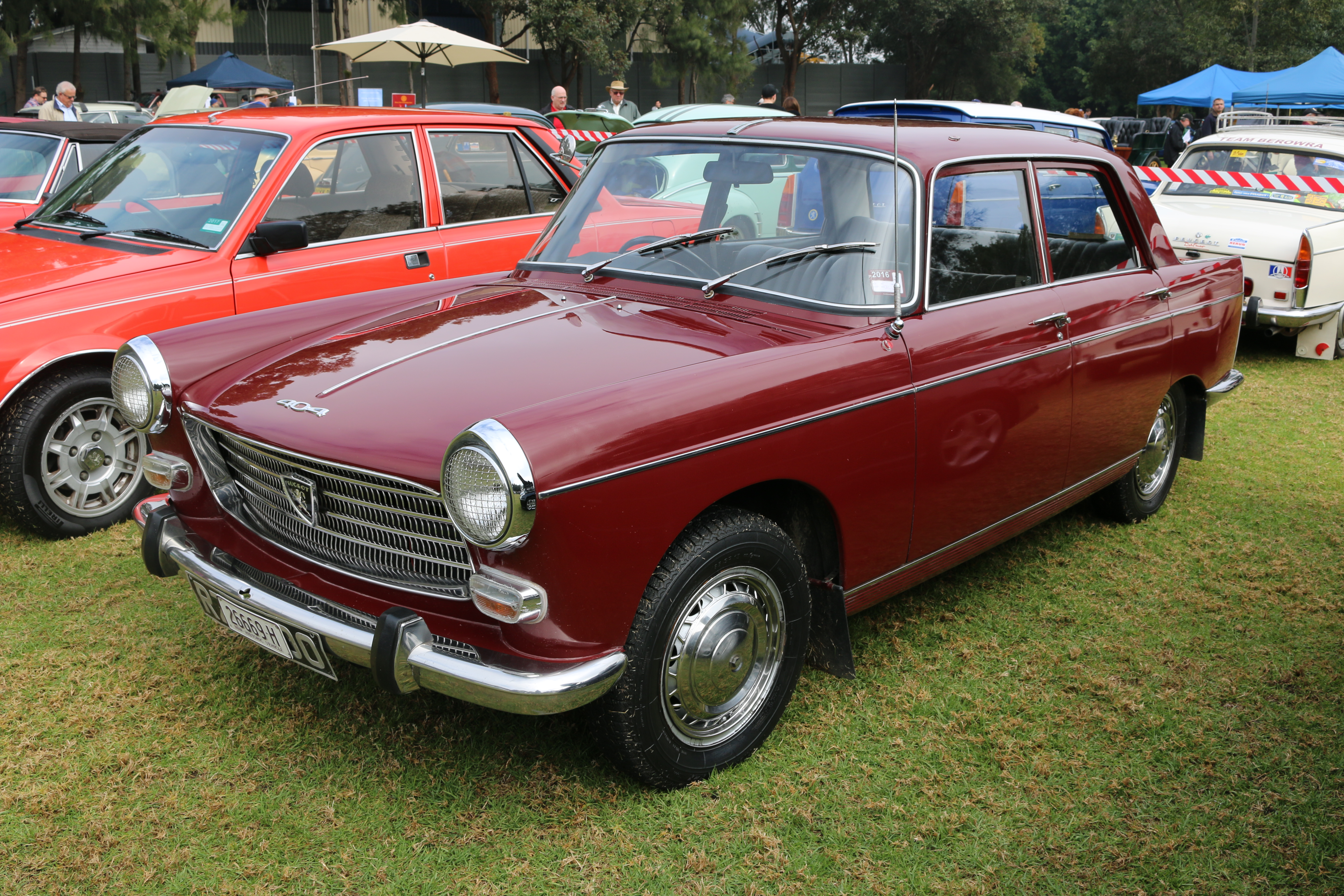
- Peugeot 404 Sedan

Overview
- Manufacturer: Peugeot SA
- Production: 1960–1975
- Assembly: France: Sochaux (Sochaux Plant); Argentina: El Palomar; Australia: Heidelberg, Victoria; Canada: Saint-Bruno-de-Montarville, Quebec (SoMA); Chile: Los Andes (Automotores Franco Chilena S.A.); Colombia: Bogotá (CCA); Kenya: Mombasa; New Zealand: Thames (Campbell Motor Industries); Peru: Lima (Braillard); South Africa: Natalspruit, Transvaal
- Designer: Pininfarina

Body and chassis
- Class: Large family car (D)
- Body style: 4-door saloon 5-door estate 2-door coupé 2-door convertible 2-door coupé utility (pickup)
- Layout: FR layout

Powertrain
- Engine: petrol: 1468 cc XB I4; 1616 cc XC I4; 1616 cc XCKF FI I4; 1796 cc XM7 I4 (ZA only); diesel: 1816 cc XD85 I4; 1948 cc XD88 I4
- Transmission: 4-speed manual 3-speed ZF automatic

Dimensions
- Wheelbase: 2,650–2,840 mm (104.3–111.8 in)
- Length: 4,442 mm (174.9 in) (saloon); 4,580 mm (180.3 in) (estate); 4,492 mm (176.9 in) (coupé & cabriolet)
- Width: 1,612 mm (63.5 in); 1,680 mm (66.1 in) (coupé & cabriolet)
- Height: 1,450 mm (57.1 in) (saloon); 1,490 mm (58.7 in) (estate); 1,300 mm (51.2 in) (coupé & cabriolet)
- Curb weight: 1,060–1,250 kg (2,337–2,756 lb)

Chronology
- Predecessor: Peugeot 403
- Successor: Peugeot 504

The Peugeot 404 is a large family car produced by French automobile manufacturer Peugeot from 1960 to 1975. A truck body style variant was marketed until 1988. Styled by Pininfarina, the 404 was offered initially as a saloon, estate, and pickup. A convertible was added in 1962, and a coupé in 1963. The 404 was fitted with a 1.6 litre petrol engine, with either a Solex carburetor or Kugelfischer mechanical fuel injection or a 1.9 litre diesel engine available as options. Introduced at the Paris Motor Show as an option was the inclusion of a 3-speed ZF automatic transmission, similar to the unit already offered on certain BMW models, as an alternative to the standard column-mounted manual unit.

Popular as a taxicab, the 404 enjoyed a reputation for durability and value. The 404 was manufactured under licence in various African countries until 1991 (in Kenya) and was manufactured in Argentina by Safrar/Sevel in El Palomar; in Québec, Canada at the St-Bruno-de-Montarville Sociéte de Montage Automobile (SoMA) Ltd. plant (1965–1968); in New Zealand by Campbell Industries; in Australia by Renault Australia Pty. Ltd.; and in Chile by Automotores Franco Chilena S.A. in Los Andes. Peugeot's French production run of 1,847,568 404s ended in 1975. A total of 2,885,374 units had been produced worldwide at the end of production.

As the model was designed by Pininfarina, the bodyshell is very similarly styled to the one used in the 1959 Austin Westminster.

== Production history ==
=== 1960 ===
Saloon introduced with 73 PS (54 kW; 72 bhp) petrol engine and column-shift four-speed gearbox with gate "reversed" (first down, up for second, and towards the wheel for third down and fourth up) – identical to the 203 and 403 (except that fourth gear is direct drive). The Grand Touring model has square air vents on the dashboard and body-coloured wheels.

=== 1961 ===
Introduction of the Super Luxe model: Superstructure painted silver, chromed headlight rims, large diameter hubcaps, tan leather interior trim, front armrest. The body coloured wheels on the Grand Touring model were replaced with metallic silver ones.

=== 1962 ===
A new suspension with increased travel and flexibility was added. The dashboard was modified and the square air vents were replaced by circular directional vents. New reinforced drum brake linings were installed. Anti-reflective paint was used for the dashboard.

Introduction of Commerciale, Break and seven-seat Family estate versions, with tandem coil spring rear suspension in the place of the sedan's single spring arrangement. These versions have a balanced spring system to assist in opening the tailgate, different rear light clusters, rear bumper arrangement and the fuel filler cap is no longer hidden behind the rear number plate, but behind a flap in the rear wing. These variants have a 190 mm [7 in] longer wheelbase and are also longer (4,590 mm [181 in] compared to 4,445 mm [175 in]) and heavier (1,190 kg [2,624 lb] compared to 1,100 kg [2,425 lb]) than their saloon equivalents. The Commerciale (U6) is fitted with a 1468 cc engine (XB2), producing 60 hp DIN (44 kW) at 5000 rpm.

=== Convertible launch ===
The Peugeot 404 cabriolet/convertible made its first appearance at the Paris Motor Show in October 1961 and the accompanying coupé version was launched six months later. The convertible and coupé bodyshells were made by the Pinin Farina workshops in Turin and only the floorpan and mechanical elements were shared with the saloon. These models were initially powered by the same single carburetter engine as the saloon and the option of a fuel injected engine (XCKF1) with a Kugelfischer injection system was added to the range at the Geneva Motor Show in March 1962. The US$3,899 price in 1965 put the convertible in the same price bracket as the Jaguar E-Type in the American market.

=== 1963 ===
The 404 Super Luxe sedan has the 86 PS (63 kW; 85 bhp) fuel injection engine (XCKF) and has door cappings trimmed with leather. The 404 Grand Touring sedan adopts painted side window trims instead of chrome. The steering wheel and horn ring are changed. In March the 404 Diesel with Indenor engine (XD85) is launched, although this is only built for seven months before being updated for the next model year. Between July and September, the carburetted engines of the sedan adopts five bearings (XC5), as do the fuel injected models (XCKF1).

The Family estate gains a split middle row of seats to improve access to the rear row The 404 coupé is introduced with the same body as the cabriolet but with a fixed roof.

=== 1964 ===
The 404 Diesel's XD85 engine is replaced by the XD88, which has a more powerful and reliable Bosch pump. Rubber over-riders were now fitted on the bumpers, and bi-colour oval front indicator clusters were equipped on coupés and convertibles (a similar design was used later on sedans and derivatives).

=== 1965 ===
Injection engine XCKF1 (85 PS [63 kW; 84 bhp]) replaced by XCKF2, with power increased to 96 PS (71 kW; 95 bhp). For the new model year, XC5 carburettor engine power is increased to 76 PS (56 kW; 75 bhp) in September 1964. Thermostable Hydrovac brakes servo-assisted by a mechanical vacuum manufactured by Bendix. The Super Luxe, coupé and convertible get eight-hole wheel covers cells instead of six-hole ones. New seat pads for Grand Touring, with cloth quilted to form longitudinal ridges similar to the 404 Super Luxe. All models are given reclining front seats.

In October 1964 the 404 A8 was introduced, using an updated version of the 403's 1.5-liter engine called the XB2 and with stripped down equipment. "A8" signifies Administration and 8 tax horsepower; this model was only available to French government agencies. This version was built until September 1967 (when the 404/8 replaced it) but only 525 examples left the lines.

=== 1966 ===
The Grand Touring saloon is available with the XCKF2 injection engine. It was also available with a ZF automatic gearbox. The front indicator light clusters are now orange / white on all models. Two tone door linings (black top and bottom) on all models. Cigarette lighter fitted on Super Luxe only. Brake compensator fitted on petrol models. In June 1966, the millionth Peugeot 404 left the band at Peugeot's Sochaux plant.

=== 1967 ===
The new XC6 carburetor engine fitted with increased power of 69 PS (51 kW; 68 bhp) net (80 bhp SAE). The engine bearings benefitted from improved shells. Rear anti roll bar fitted. New dashboard with three round dials. The spare wheel is relocated from inside the boot to under rear of the car. The rear valance is amended (Saloon only) and the capacity of the petrol tank is increased from 50 to 55 L (11 to 12 imp gal; 13 to 15 US gal) (saloon). Cigarette lighter fitted on all models, Super Luxe has automatic light on lockable glovebox. The front of coupés and convertibles is redesigned, incorporating a new grille with integral driving lamps and rectangular indicator clusters. The convertible hood now has a "Panoramic" rear window and the seat mechanism is improved for better accessibility.

In March, unveiling of the Camionnette bâchée / Canvas Top Van (pick-up).

=== 1968 ===
In October 1967, at the Paris Salon, the 404/8 Confort model (8 CV) was added to the range. Called the XB5, this is a development of the 1,468 cc (89.6 cu in) XB2 engine used in the 403 since 1960 and also in the 404 A8. It is an economy model, fitting into a lower French puissance fiscale (road tax) class than the 9 CV version, but unlike the earlier 404 A8 this version was generally available to the public. It used the earlier dashboard design and bumpers without over riders, along with painted rather than chromed headlight surrounds. This was also the first 404 model to benefit from front disc brakes. 8 CV cars were not imported into the UK, but some RHD models are produced for other markets. Unlike the left-hand drive version, right-hand drive 404/8 models received drum brakes all around. Despite a price about ten percent lower than the 9CV model, the step-up in taxes between an 8 and a 9CV was minimal at this time and the 404/8 was not a strong seller, apart from with government agencies.

The last 404 Coupé and Cabriolet models were produced in October 1968, after a production run of 17,223 units.

For model year 1968, reversing lamps were fitted to Super Luxe while a new gearbox with European grid (BA7) was fitted on all models in place of the "C3" box. New steering wheel, dashboard modified.

=== 1969 ===
Peugeot launches the 504. 404 Injection no longer offered, new door interior panels introduced. Front disc brakes fitted on all petrol models. The 404/8 is modified for the new year, only to be discontinued in October 1969 so as to not compete internally with the new 7CV Peugeot 304.

=== 1970–1972 ===
For 1970, the 404 Super Luxe was discontinued, while the 404 (8 CV) Confort was discontinued in the domestic French market, leaving the Grand Touring, Break and Familiale models to continue in petrol and diesel forms. The 404/8 Confort continued to be produced for export markets until February 1972. The Grand Touring receives chrome headlight rims and reversing lights as standard. Wing-mounted indicator repeaters are no longer fitted. New XC7 engine fitted (de-tuned to 73 PS [54 kW; 72 bhp]), but with torque equivalent to XC6.

New front indicator clusters from 1971, which was also the last year that the Break and Familiale models were sold in France. Two-speed windscreen wipers introduced on the sedan 1972, with an optional rear screen demister.

=== 1973–1975 ===
The water temperature gauge was replaced by a warning lamp on the dashboard, grille shield is replaced by lion. The optional automatic transmission (which is now six positions: PRN 3 2 1) remained available until the end of 1974. In May 1975, production of European passenger models ceased. By this time Peugeot customers in Europe strongly favoured the newer 304 and 504 models, and French 404 production was much reduced, with only 15,780 – all berlines/saloons/sedans – produced during the first five months of 1975.

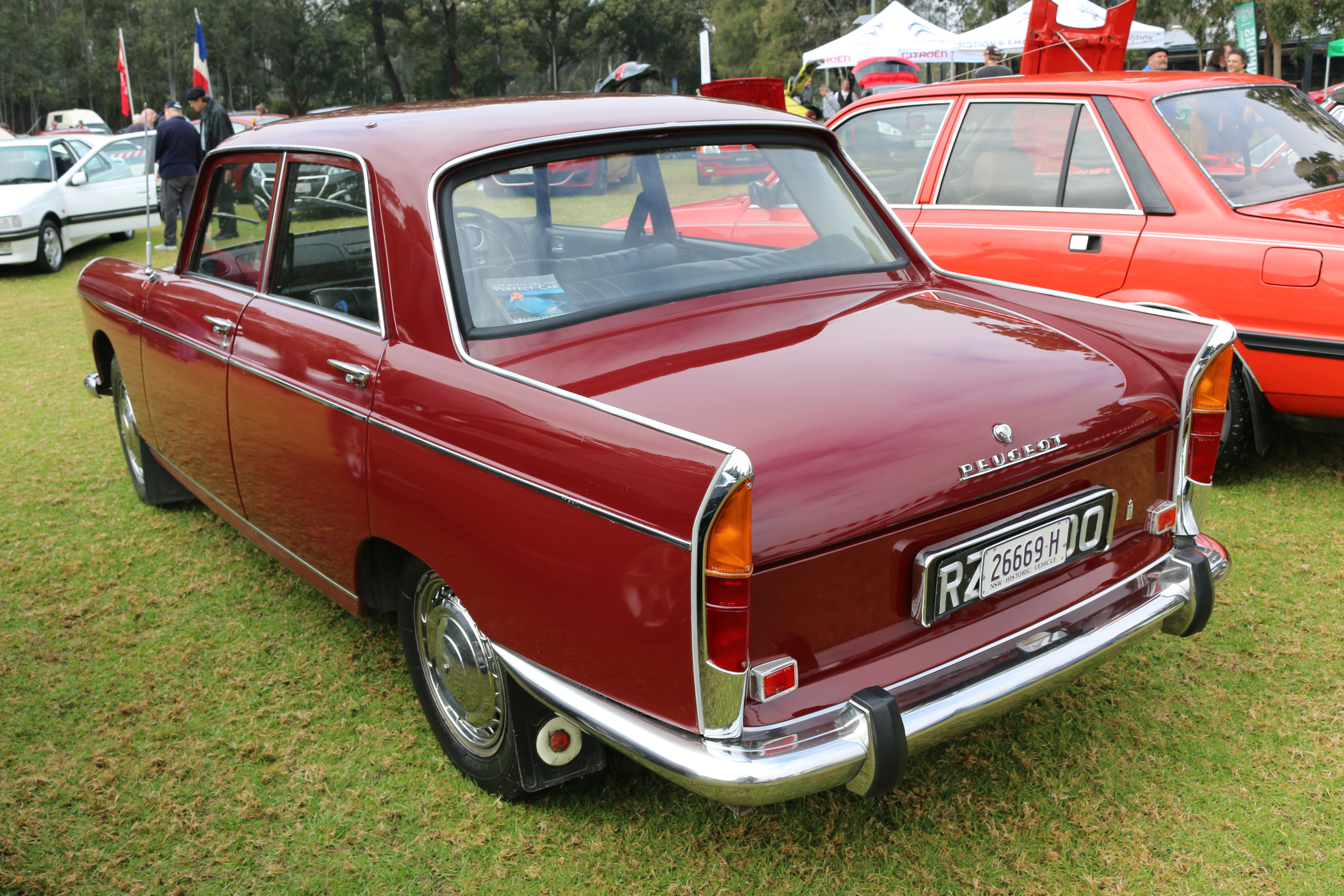
Peugeot 404 sedan

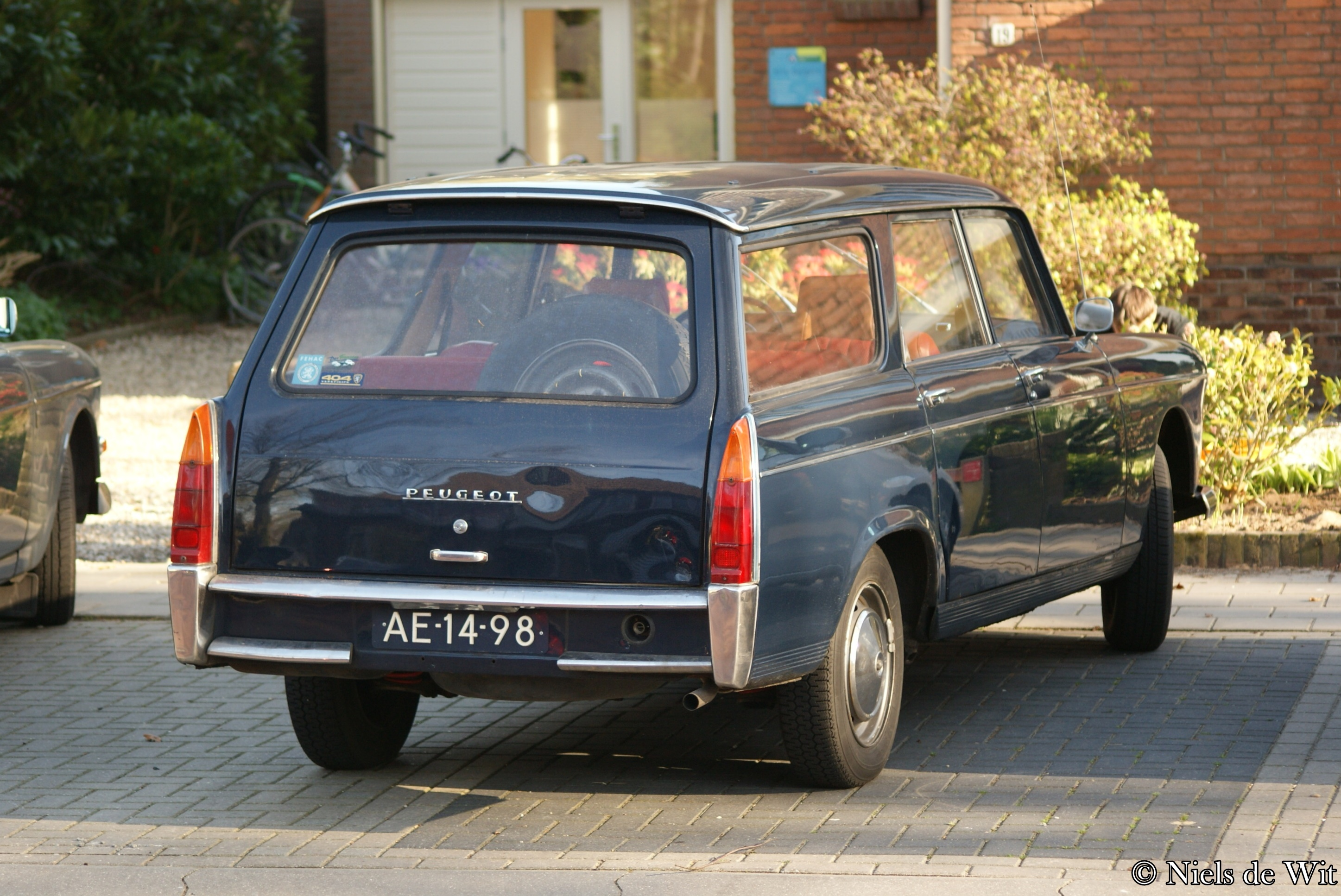
Peugeot 404 Break L

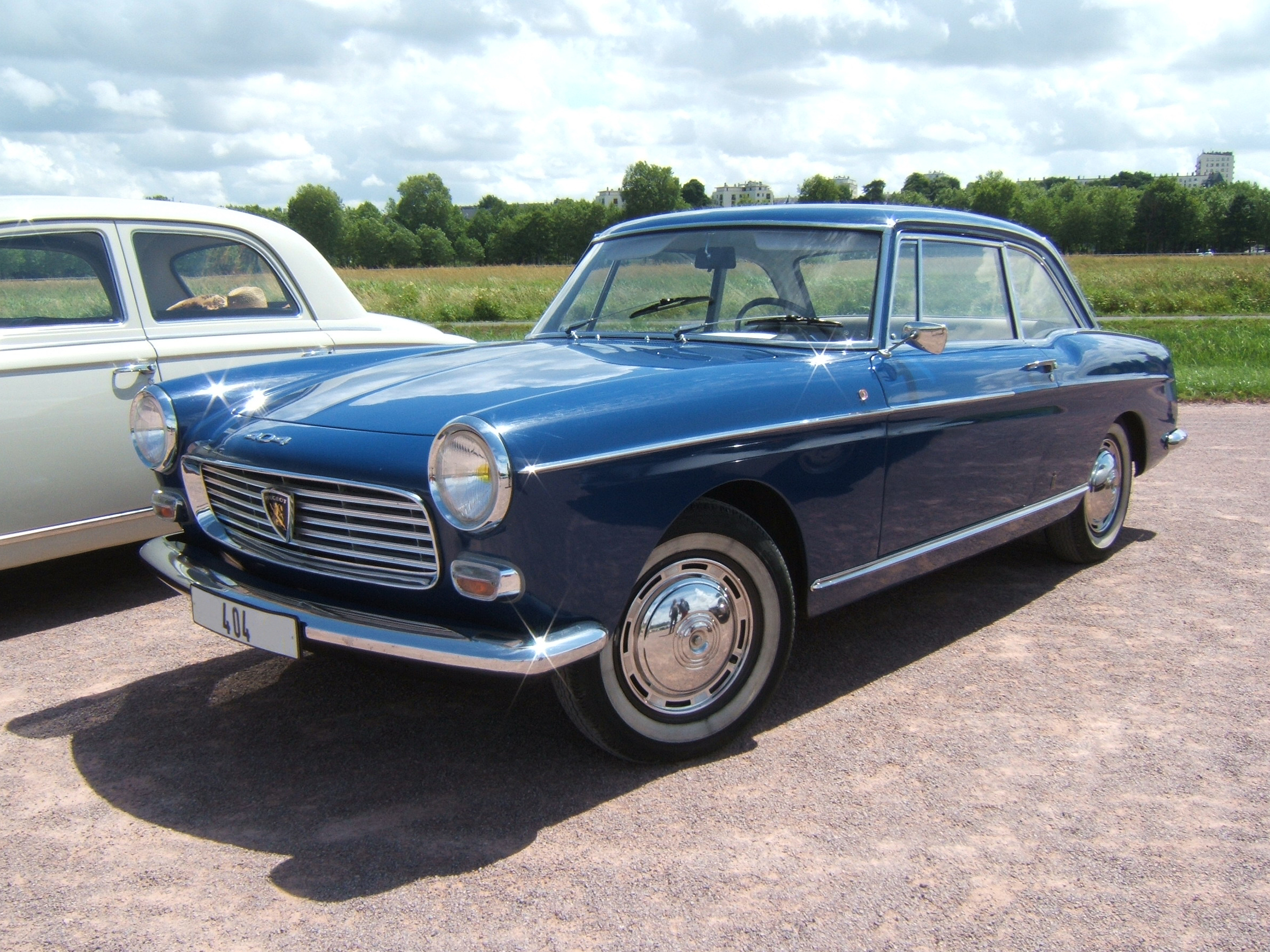
Peugeot 404 coupé

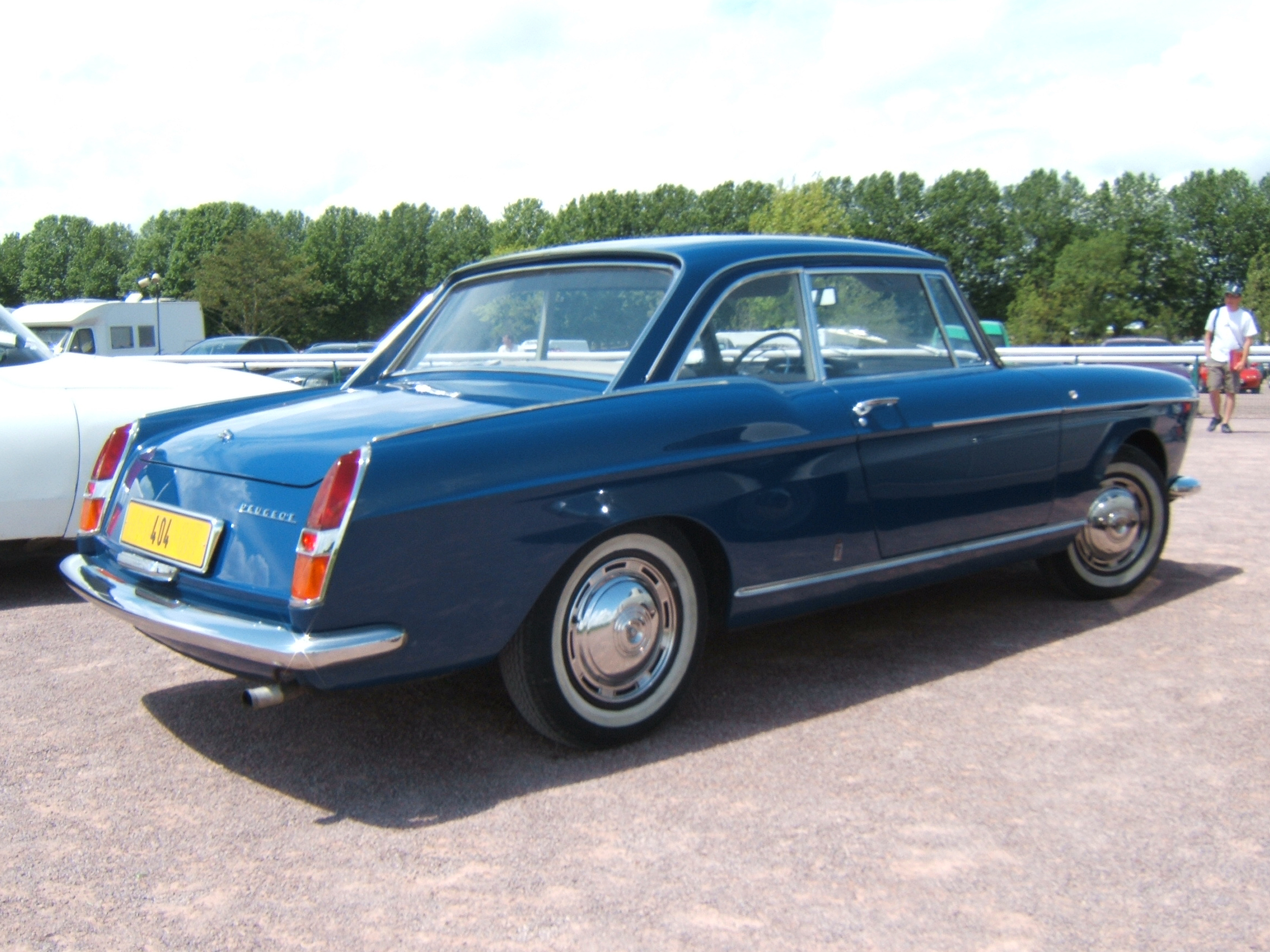
Peugeot 404 coupé

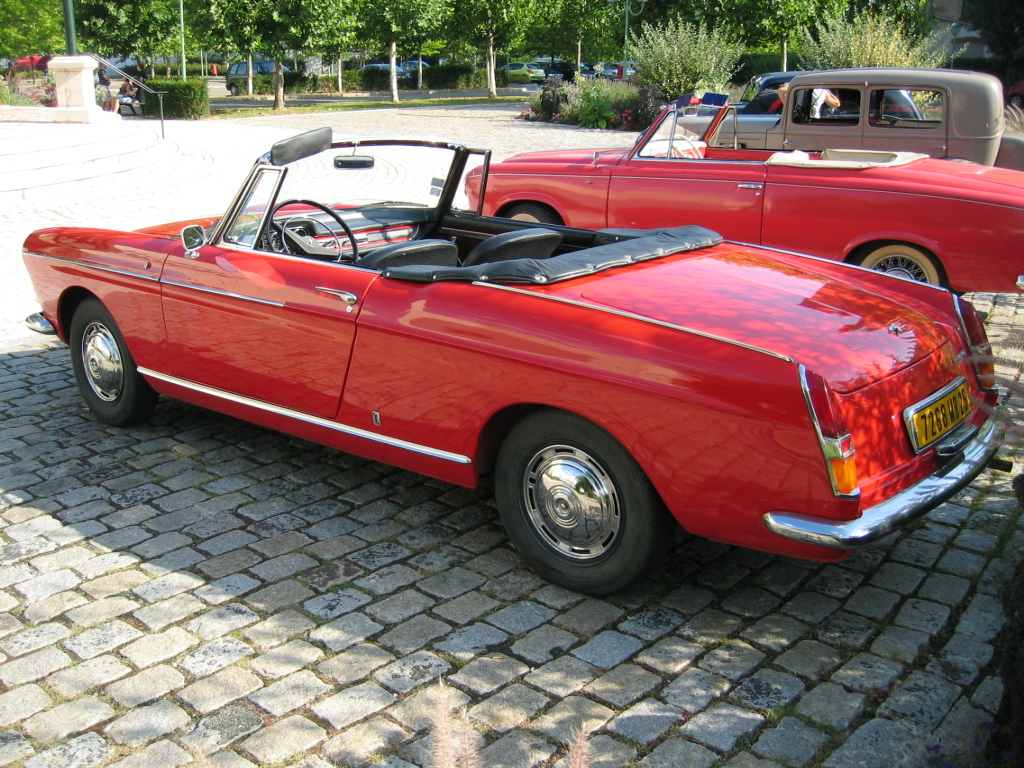
Peugeot 404 cabriolet

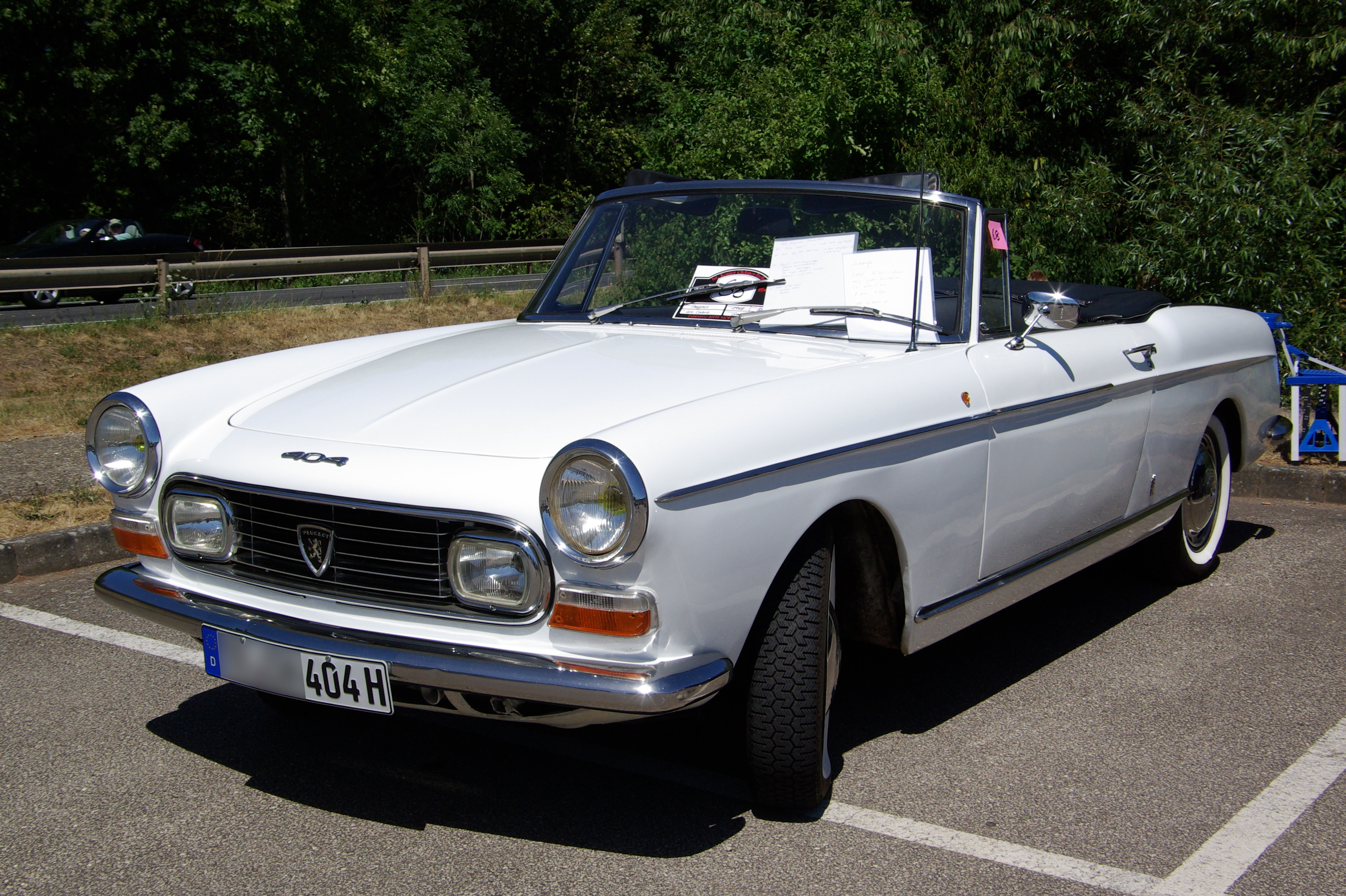
1968 Cabriolet with new grille and indicators

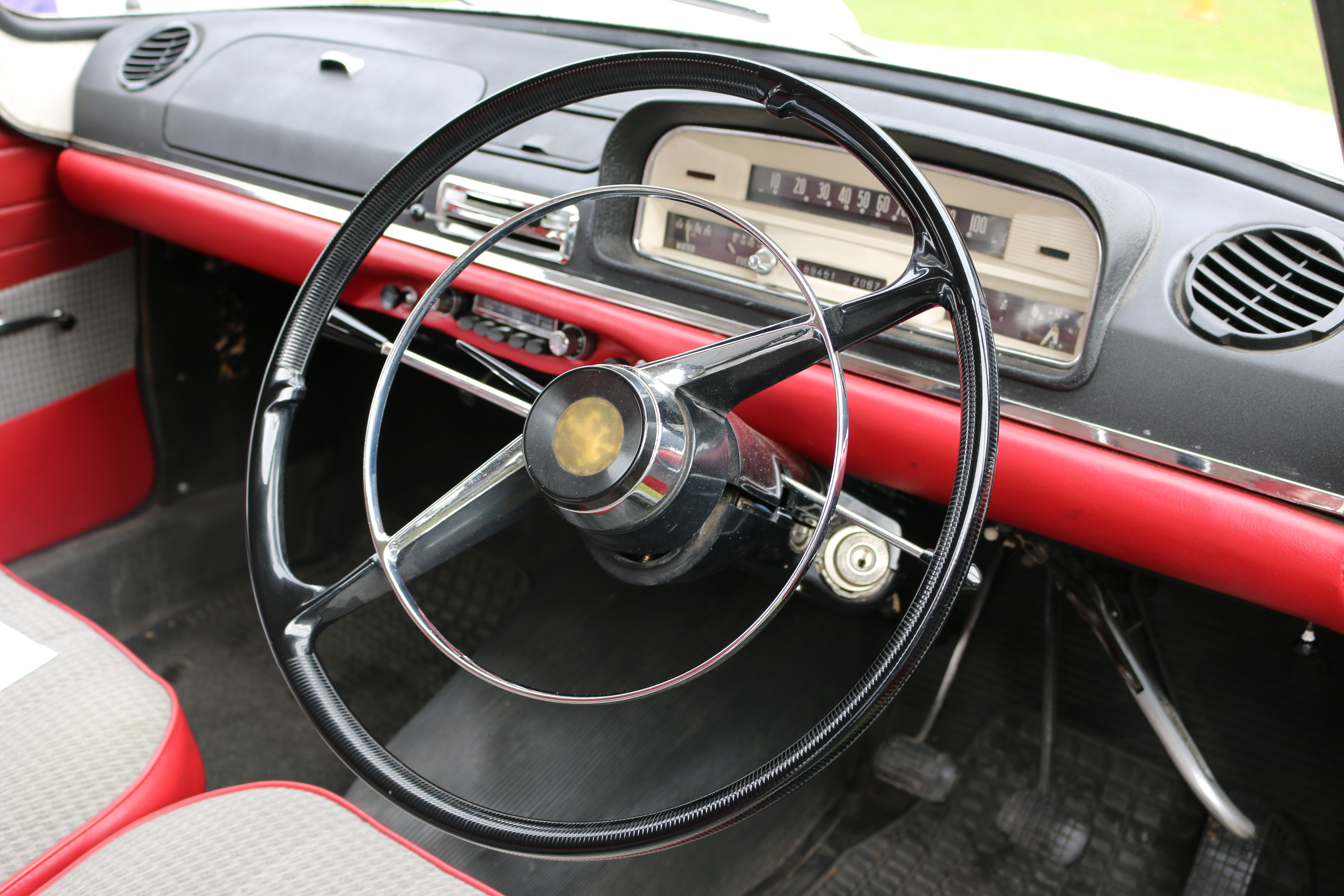
Original interior

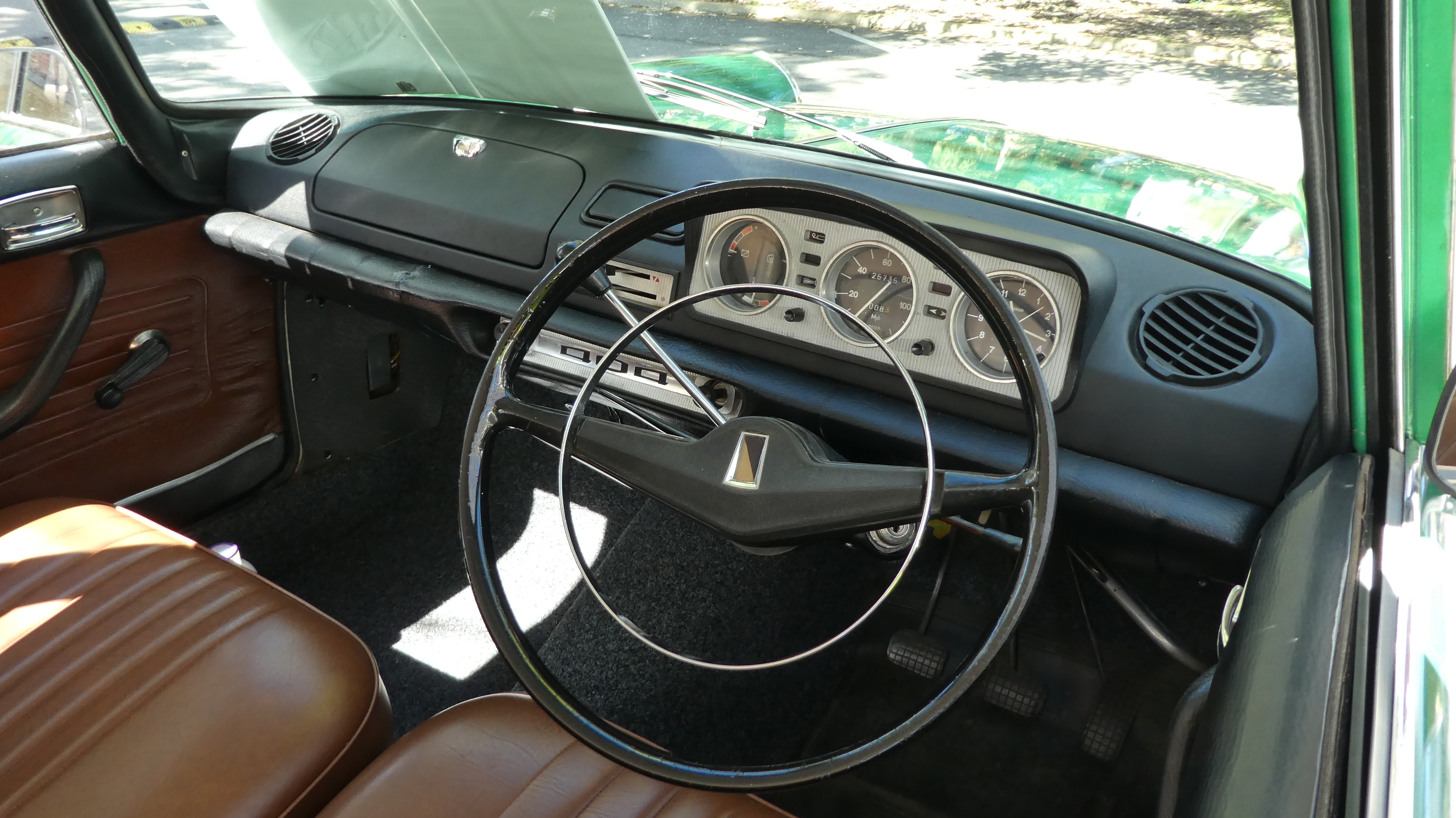
Interior 1967-1975

== Technical specifications ==
- 8 CV petrol: 1,468 cc (89.6 cu in) (60 PS [44 kW; 59 bhp]) (discontinued October 1969)
- 9 CV petrol: 1,618 cc (98.7 cu in) for carbureted models (72 PS [53 kW; 71 bhp]) or KF, KF1 injection (85 PS [63 kW; 84 bhp] at 5,500 rpm), fuel economy: 10.8 L/100 km (26 mpg_{‑imp}; 22 mpg_{‑US})
- 9 CV petrol: 1,618 cc (98.7 cu in) KF2 injection (96 PS [71 kW; 95 bhp] at 5,700 rpm).
- 8 CV Diesel: 1,948 cc (118.9 cu in) (64 PS [47 kW; 63 bhp]).
- Transmission: clutch disc or semi-automatic (Jaeger electromagnetic coupler) or ZF automatic.
- Suspension: Coil springs with hydraulic shock absorbers front and solid axle with Panhard rod at rear.
- Maximum speed: 167 km/h (104 mph) (fuel injected KF2 404 Cabriolet and Coupé)

Peugeot 404 (1960–75)
Version	Model Code	Bodystyle	Engine	Size cc	Fuel feed	Power			Torque			Brakes front/rear	Weight		Top Speed		Years produced
Version	Model Code	Bodystyle	Engine	Size cc	Fuel feed	hp	kW	/ rpm	Nm	lbft	/ rpm	Brakes front/rear	kg	lb	km/h	mph	Years produced
Petrol-engined models
404 berline administration	404 A8	Saloon	XB2	1468	Carburetor	SAE: 66; DIN: 60	49; 44	5000	SAE: 112; DIN: 107	82; 79	2,500	drum/drum	1,070	2,357	135	84	1964 – 09.1967
404/8 Confort	404/8	Saloon	XB2	1468	Carburetor	SAE: 66; DIN: 60	49; 44	5000	SAE: 112; DIN: 107	82; 79	2,500	disc/drum	1,070	2,357	135	84	09.1967 – 02.1972
404 Commerciale	404 U6	Station wagon	XB2	1468	Carburetor	SAE: 66; DIN: 60	49; 44	5000	SAE: 112; DIN: 107	82; 79	2,500	drum/drum	1,150	2,535	125	78	07.1962–1963
404 Commerciale	404 U6	Station wagon	XB5	1468	Carburetor	SAE: 66; DIN: 60	49; 44	5000	SAE: 112; DIN: 107	82; 79	2,500	drum/drum	1,150	2,535	125	78	1963 – 09.1970
404 Commerciale	404 U6S	Station wagon	XC7	1618	Carburetor	SAE: 73; DIN: 68	54; 50	5600; 5400	SAE: 127; DIN: 118	94; 87	2500	disc/drum	1,190	2,624	135	84	09.1970–1971
404 GT	404	berlina	XC	1618	Carburetor	SAE: 72; DIN: 65	53; 48	5400	SAE: 127	94	2250	drum/drum	1,070	2,359	142	88	1960 – 09.1964
404 GT	404	berlina	XC5	1618	Carburetor	SAE: 76; DIN: 70	56; 51	5600	SAE: 130	96	2500	drum/drum	1,070	2,359	146	91	09.1964–1966
404 GT	404	berlina	XC6	1618	Carburetor	SAE: 80; DIN: 74	59; 54	5600	SAE: 132	98	2500	drum/drum	1,080	2,381	150	93	1966 – 10.1968
404 GT	404	berlina	XC6	1618	Carburetor	SAE: 80; DIN: 74	59; 54	5600	SAE: 132	98	2500	disc/drum	1,080	2,381	150	93	10.1968 – 09.1970
404 GT	404	berlina	XC7	1618	Carburetor	SAE: 73; DIN: 68	54; 50	5600; 5400	SAE: 127; DIN: 118	94; 87	2500	disc/drum	1,100	2,425	148	92	09. 1970 – 05.1975
404 SL	404	berlina	XC	1618	Carburetor	SAE: 72; DIN: 65	53; 48	5400	SAE: 127	94	2250	drum/drum	1,070	2,359	142	88	1961 – 09.1964
404 SL	404	berlina	XC5	1618	Carburetor	SAE: 76; DIN: 70	56; 51	5600	SAE: 130	96	2500	drum/drum	1,070	2,359	146	91	09.1964–1966
404 SL	404	berlina	XC6	1618	Carburetor	SAE: 80; DIN: 74	59; 54	5600	SAE: 132	98	2500	drum/drum	1,080	2,381	150	93	1966–1968
404 SL	404 C	coupé	XC	1618	Carburetor	SAE: 72; DIN: 65	53; 48	5400	SAE: 127	94	2250	drum/drum	1,125	2,480	150	93	1962 – 09.1964
404 SL	404 C	coupé	XC5	1618	Carburetor	SAE: 76; DIN: 70	56; 51	5600	SAE: 130	96	2500	drum/drum	1,125	2,480	153	95	09.1964–1966
404 SL	404 C	coupé	XC6	1618	Carburetor	SAE: 80; DIN: 74	59; 54	5600	SAE: 132	98	2500	drum/drum	1,130	2,491	157	98	1966–1968
404 SL	404 C	cabriolet	XC	1618	Carburetor	SAE: 72; DIN: 65	53; 48	5400	SAE: 127	94	2250	drum/drum	1,080	2,381	148	92	1961 – 09.1964
404 SL	404 C	cabriolet	XC5	1618	Carburetor	SAE: 76; DIN: 70	56; 51	5600	SAE: 130	96	2500	drum/drum	1,080	2,381	150	93	09.1964–1966
404 SL	404 C	cabriolet	XC6	1618	Carburetor	SAE: 80; DIN: 74	59; 54	5600	SAE: 132	98	2500	drum/drum	1,080	2,381	155	96	1966–1968
404 Injection	404 KF	Saloon	XCKF	1618	Mechanical fuel injection	SAE: 85; DIN: 80	SAE: 63; DIN: 59	5500	SAE: 137	101	2800	drum/drum	1,080	2,381	155	96	1961–1963
404 Injection	404 KF	Saloon	XCKF1	1618	Mechanical fuel injection	SAE: 85; DIN: 80	SAE: 63; DIN: 59	5500	SAE: 137	101	2800	drum/drum	1,080	2,381	155	96	1963 – 09.1964
404 Injection	404 KF	Saloon	XCKF2	1618	Mechanical fuel injection	SAE: 96; DIN: 88	71; 65	5700	SAE: 141	104	2800	drum/drum	1,080	2,381	160	99	09.1964–1968
404 Injection	404 CKF	Coupé	XCKF	1618	Mechanical fuel injection	SAE: 85; DIN: 80	SAE: 63; DIN: 59	5500	SAE: 137	101	2800	drum/drum	1,100	2,425	158	98	1962-63
404 Injection	404 CKF	Coupé	XCKF1	1618	Mechanical fuel injection	SAE: 85; DIN: 80	SAE: 63; DIN: 59	5500	SAE: 137	101	2800	drum/drum	1,100	2,425	158	98	1963 – 09.1964
404 Injection	404 CKF	Coupé	XCKF2	1618	Mechanical fuel injection	SAE: 96; DIN: 88	71; 65	5700	SAE: 141	104	2800	drum/drum	1,100	2,425	167	104	09.1964–1968
404 Injection	404 CKF	Convertible	XCKF	1618	Mechanical fuel injection	SAE: 85; DIN: 80	SAE: 63; DIN: 59	5500	SAE: 137	101	2800	drum/drum	1,075	2,368	158	98	1961–1963
404 Injection	404 CKF	Convertible	XCKF1	1618	Mechanical fuel injection	SAE: 85; DIN: 80	SAE: 63; DIN: 59	5500	SAE: 137	101	2800	drum/drum	1,075	2,368	158	98	1963 – 09.1964
404 Injection	404 CKF	Convertible	XCKF2	1618	Mechanical fuel injection	SAE: 96; DIN: 88	71; 65	5700	SAE: 141	104	2800	drum/drum	1,075	2,368	167	104	09.1964–1968
404 Break SL	404 L XC5 TH	Station wagon	XC5	1618	Carburetor	SAE: 76; DIN: 70	56; 51	5600	SAE: 130	96	2500	drum/drum	1,175	2,590	140	87	09.1964–1966
404 Break SL	404 L XC6 TH	Station wagon	XC6	1618	Carburetor	SAE: 80; DIN: 74	59; 54	5600	SAE: 132	98	2500	drum/drum	1,190	2,624	145	90	1966 – 10.1968
404 Break SL	404 L XC6 TH	Station wagon	XC6	1618	Carburetor	SAE: 80; DIN: 74	59; 54	5600	SAE: 132	98	2500	disc/drum	1,190	2,624	145	90	10. 1968 – 09.1970
404 Break SL	404 L XC7 TH	Station wagon	XC7	1618	Carburetor	SAE: 73; DIN: 68	54; 50	5600; 5400	SAE: 127; DIN: 118	94; 87	2500	disc/drum	1,190	2,624	138	86	09.1970–1971
404 Familiale	404 L XC TW	Station wagon	XC	1618	Carburetor	SAE: 72; DIN: 65	53; 48	5400	SAE: 127	94	2250	drum/drum	1,175	2,588	135	84	07.1962 – 09.1964
404 Familiale	404 L XC5 TW	Station wagon	XC5	1618	Carburetor	SAE: 76; DIN: 70	56; 51	5600	SAE: 130	96	2500	drum/drum	1,175	2,588	140	87	09.1964–1966
404 Familiale	404 L XC6 TW	Station wagon	XC6	1618	Carburetor	SAE: 80; DIN: 74	59; 54	5600	SAE: 132	98	2500	drum/drum	1,190	2,624	145	90	1966 – 10.1968
404 Familiale	404 L XC6 TW	Station wagon	XC6	1618	Carburetor	SAE: 80; DIN: 74	59; 54	5600	SAE: 132	98	2500	disc/drum	1,190	2,624	145	90	10.1968 – 09.1970
404 Familiale	404 L XC7 TW	Station wagon	XC7	1618	Carburetor	SAE: 73; DIN: 68	54; 50	5600; 5400	SAE: 127; DIN: 118	94; 87	2500	disc/drum	1,190	2,624	138	86	09.1970–1971
Diesel-engined models
404 Diesel	404 D	Saloon	XD88	1948	Naturally aspirated diesel	SAE: 68; DIN: 60	50; 44	4500	SAE: 119	88	2250	drum/drum	1,150	2,535	130	81	1963 – 09.1972
404 Diesel	404 D	Saloon	XD88	1948	Naturally aspirated diesel	SAE: 65; DIN: 57	48; 42	4500	-	-	-	drum/drum	1,150	2,535	128	80	09.1972 – 05.1975
404 Familiale; Diesel	404 LD	Station wagon	XD85	1816	Naturally aspirated diesel	SAE: 55; DIN: 50	40; 37	4000	SAE: 108	80	2250	drum/drum	1,250	2,756	120	75	07.1962–1964
404 Familiale; Diesel	404 LD	Station wagon	XD88	1948	Naturally aspirated diesel	SAE: 68; DIN: 60	50; 44	4500	SAE: 119	88	2250	drum/drum	1,170	2,579	128	80	1964 – 05.1975
404 Commerciale; Diesel	404 U6D	Station wagon	XD85	1816	Naturally aspirated diesel	SAE: 55; DIN: 50	40; 37	4000	SAE: 108	80	2250	drum/drum	1,225	2,701	110	68	07.1962–1965
404 Commerciale; Diesel	404 U6D	Station wagon	XD88	1948	Naturally aspirated diesel	SAE: 63; DIN: 53	46; 39	4000	SAE:			drum/drum	1,225	2,701	115	71	1965 – 05.1975

== Foreign assembly ==
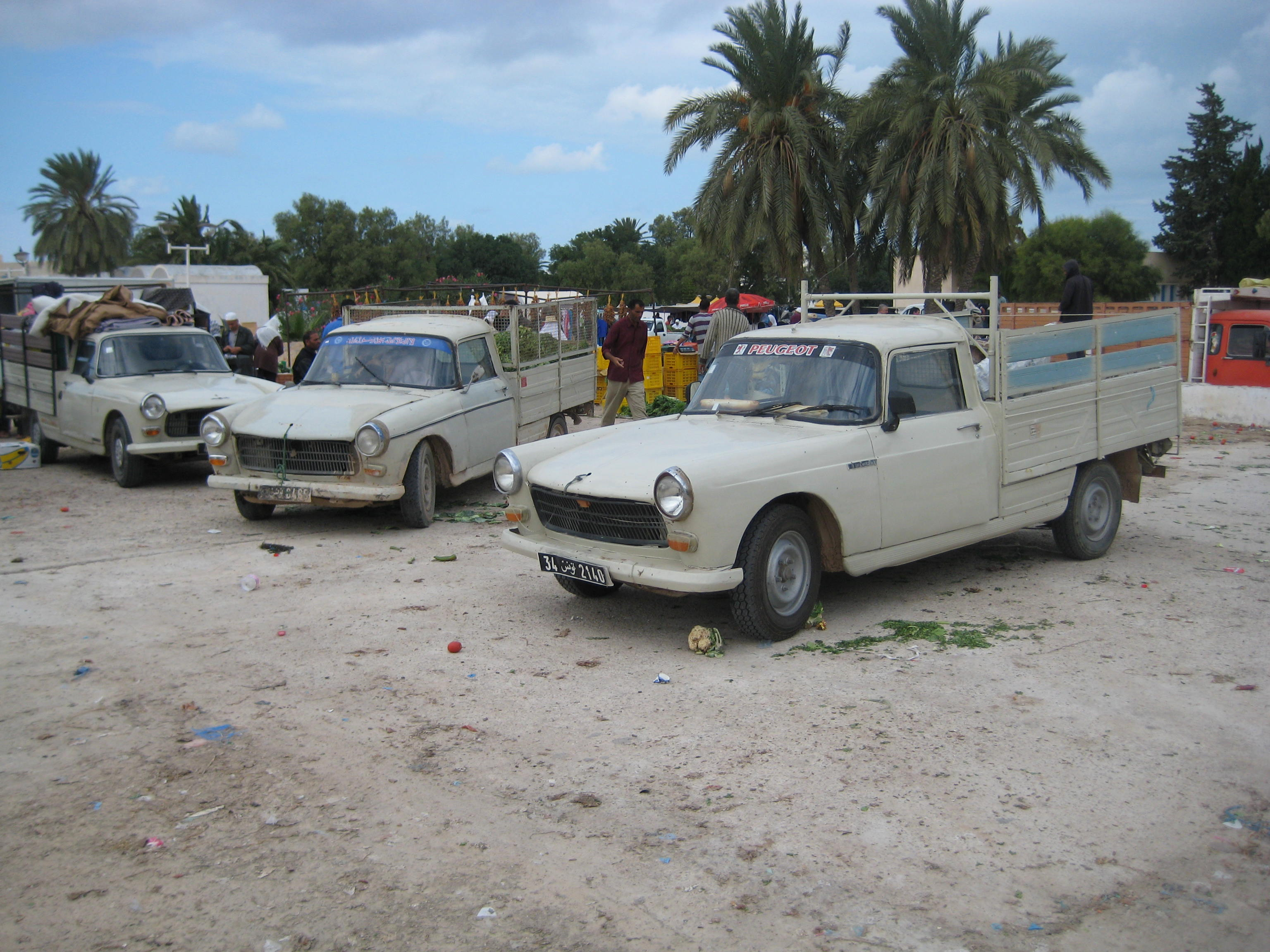
Three Peugeot 404 pickups in Tunisia, still in use in 2011

The 404 was assembled in a number of countries besides France. It was manufactured by Safrar in Argentina (later Sevel) (162,583 cars built), and assembly took place in Australia (by the local Renault subsidiary – 8600 cars built), Belgium, Canada (about 3100 404 sedans were built at the SoMA plant shared with Renault), Chile (14,892 cars built), Ireland, Kenya, Madagascar, Malaysia, New Zealand (2800 cars built), Nigeria, Portugal, Peru (by Braillard starting in 1967), Rhodesia, South Africa (79,045 cars built), and Uruguay.

In South Africa, where the 404 saloon continued in production until the end of 1978, the GL and Automatique versions received the more powerful 1.8-litre (110 cu in) XM7 engine also used in the 504. The GL also received front seats similar to those of the 504, as well as the 504's floor-mounted shifter with its characteristic bend. Late cars also have 504 steering wheels, as 404 parts were becoming scarce. The 404 Wagon was assembled until early 1976, when the supply of French CKD kits dried up.

The 404, especially in pickup form, is still a common sight in North and West Africa. The Argentinian-built 404 was available with both the 1.6 petrol and the diesel engine, in Standard or Luxe equipment levels. The Luxe featured sporty alloy wheels and a special grille with integrated extra lamps.

== Road tests and press reviews ==
=== 404 coupé injection ===
The 404 coupé with the desirable "KF2" fuel injected engine was tested by Motor magazine on December 4, 1965. The title of the article is "A First Class Job" and the rest of the article follows suit in praising the model, highlighting the car's remarkable performance and beauty. Even with 415 lb (188 kg) of driver and test equipment on board, the car posted a 0–60 mph (0–97 km/h) acceleration time of 12.2 seconds, 18.8 seconds in the standing start 1/4 mile (0.40 km) and a top speed of 105.2 mph (169.3 km/h). Fuel economy (over a shorter test distance than usual) was 23.8 mpg_{‑imp} (11.9 L/100 km; 19.8 mpg_{‑US}), which the author suggests would have improved had the usual test distance been completed. The punitive British taxes of the 1960s made this a very expensive car indeed, equivalent in cost to a Jaguar Mark X. Overall the conclusions of the review were that it was an excellent car.

=== 404 saloon ===
Autocar magazine tested the 96 hp (97 PS; 72 kW) fuel injected KF2 version of the 404 saloon/sedan in the spring of 1965. The testers summarized the car as follows: "100 MPH maximum and high cruising speeds; very well developed fuel injection giving easy starting and moderate fuel consumption; powerful fade-free drum brakes; accurate steering and good compromise suspension; comfortable seating with leather trim; sun-roof a standard fitting; priced rather high in the U.K." Mean maximum speed was measured at 100 mph (160 km/h) with a best leg of 101 mph (163 km/h); the standing start 1/4 mile (0.40 km) was measured at 18.8 seconds. Overall fuel consumption was 25.1 mpg_{‑imp} (11.3 L/100 km; 20.9 mpg_{‑US}).

Canada Track & Traffic Magazine also tested the Peugeot 404 with fuel injection in their May 1965 issue. The testers measured a 0–60 mph (0–97 km/h) time of 12.1 seconds, with a top speed of 98 mph (158 km/h). A good cruising speed is 85 mph (137 km/h), according to the article. "It is difficult to single out any one aspect of the Peugeot as being outstanding, for in truth the whole car is outstanding." The writer concludes with: "To summarize, we can only say that the Peugeot 404 is a car that we find almost impossible to criticize, from any standpoint. It is a car that ideally combines comfort, quality and economy. In short, it is the kind of car one can buy with absolute confidence and drive and drive and drive, for longevity comes with quality in the case of Peugeot."

The 404 saloon was tested by Motor magazine in 1968. The styling was criticised as square cut, perpendicular and appearing rather dated, while the interior was considered "austere" compared to British cars of the time (the article includes a performance comparison with the Triumph 2000, Ford Corsair 2000E and Humber Sceptre). However, great praise is given for build quality, with the article stating that the car is suitable for African safaris and Arctic gales alike.

=== 404 Familiale ===
The 404 was tested (in Family estate form) by Motor magazine in 1965. The car's quirks (the unusual original column-shift gearbox gate and awkward body roll at low speed) are listed. Build quality was praised and the interior described as "quietly tasteful", although the authors felt that the appeal of the car was limited.

The car was tested again by Motor magazine five years later. The article is critical of the car's styling, calling it "square cut" and "hardly avant garde", but then relents and opts for "mature rather than dated" as its final comment. The ride is reported to improve as loading and speed increase. Of some concern to the testers was the driver's difficulty in reaching the handbrake when wearing a fixed seat-belt – inertia reel type belts would not have this problem. Alternative cars were listed as the Citroen Safari and Volvo 145. The car is described as having been used by one reader to transport the driver and 12 children.

An article in The Times newspaper on French-made cars includes a comparison of the outgoing 404 with the 504. The performance of both cars (given their engine size) is praised.

=== 404 Diesel ===
During the 1960s Peugeot, along with Mercedes-Benz, were pioneering large scale production of diesel engined passenger cars. The British "Autocar" magazine tested a Peugeot 404 Diesel in November 1965. The car had a top speed of 81 mph (130 km/h) and accelerated from 0–60 mph (0–97 km/h) in 25.5 seconds. An "overall" fuel consumption of 32.2 mpg_{‑imp} (8.8 L/100 km; 26.8 mpg_{‑US}) was recorded. This compared with a top speed of 88 mph (142 km/h), a 0–60 mph (0–97 km/h) time of 20 seconds and an overall fuel consumption of 32.2 mpg_{‑imp} (8.8 L/100 km; 26.8 mpg_{‑US}) for the petrol version of the car which had recently been tested by the same journal and which (albeit without the diesel car's rev limiter) had exactly the same gear ratios. In terms of performance the Peugeot comfortably outperformed the diesel Austin Cambridge and the Mercedes Benz 190D also included in the comparison. The slower Austin nonetheless won on fuel economy. In terms of price, the 404 diesel was offered in the UK at £1,396 as against £1,093 for its petrol fuelled sibling. The manufacturer's recommended price for the Austin was just £875. The slower heavier Mercedes was not really pitched at the same market segment, being priced in the UK at £2,050. The testers described the Peugeot 404 Diesel as 'the fastest diesel yet'. They reported the characteristic diesel rattle when idling and the 'roar at high revs', but found the performance 'very reasonable'. They commended the sure-footed road holding, good steering, powerful fade-free brakes, the comfortable seats, the very good fuel economy and the prospect for a 'long attention-free life'.

The 404 Diesel was tested again (in Family estate form) by Autocar magazine six years later. Top speed was improved on the previous test, 82 mph (132 km/h), but acceleration to 60 mph (97 km/h) was poorer at 26.8 seconds. Notable features in the report were that the test car had broken two speedometer cables during testing. They mention its size twice: "wonderfully roomy" and "a big car for big men". The cars "oddities" are listed as the reverse-acting gearbox gate, window-sill door locks and windscreen wiper controls. 404 Diesels were widely used as taxis, and appeared as such in contemporary films.

In June 1965, a 1962 model 404 convertible - in fact the 34th 404C built by Pininfarina - equipped with the Indénor 88 Diesel engine, displacing just under 2 litres and rated at 68 BHP (SAE), and streamlined with a single seat and a fighter aircraft style canopy over the driving seat was brought to Monthléry racetrack near Paris and run for 103 hours at a 161 Km/h (just over 100 MPH ) average on the banked oval track of Montlhéry, covering 16,627 Kilometres. A team of five pilots took two hours shifts and had to stick to a tight average (not just full speed pedal-to-the-floor run) helped by a clever device, an adjustable "snail" shaped stopper on the throttle linkage. As per record regulations, the car had to carry a very comprehensive toolkit and a massive amount of spares, including transmission axles and spare drum brakes and weighed a hefty 1135 Kgs in record trim.

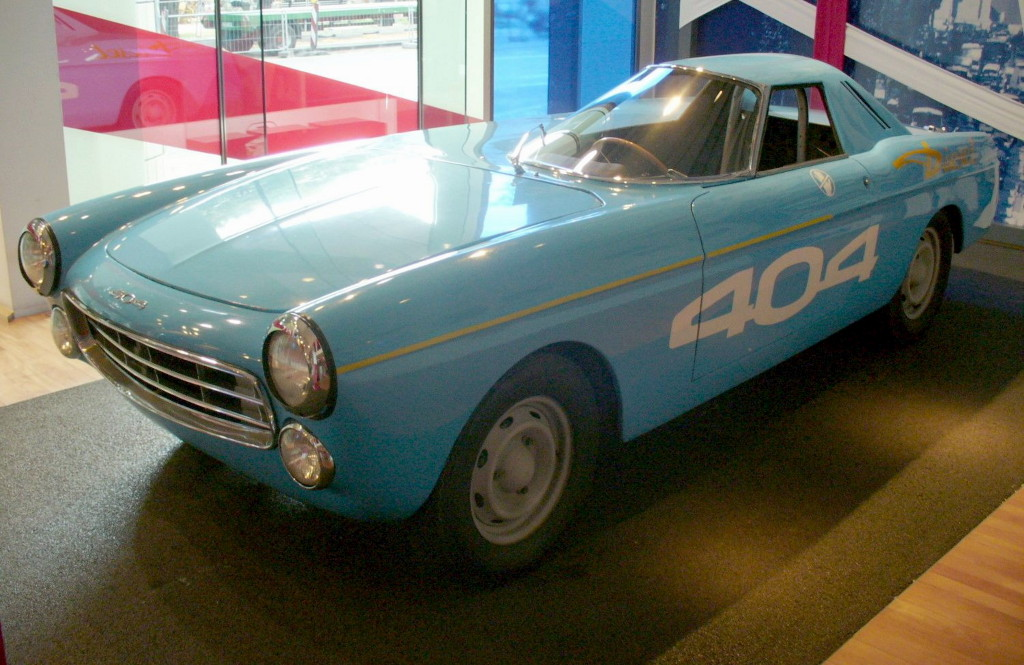
Peugeot 404 diesel record car 1965

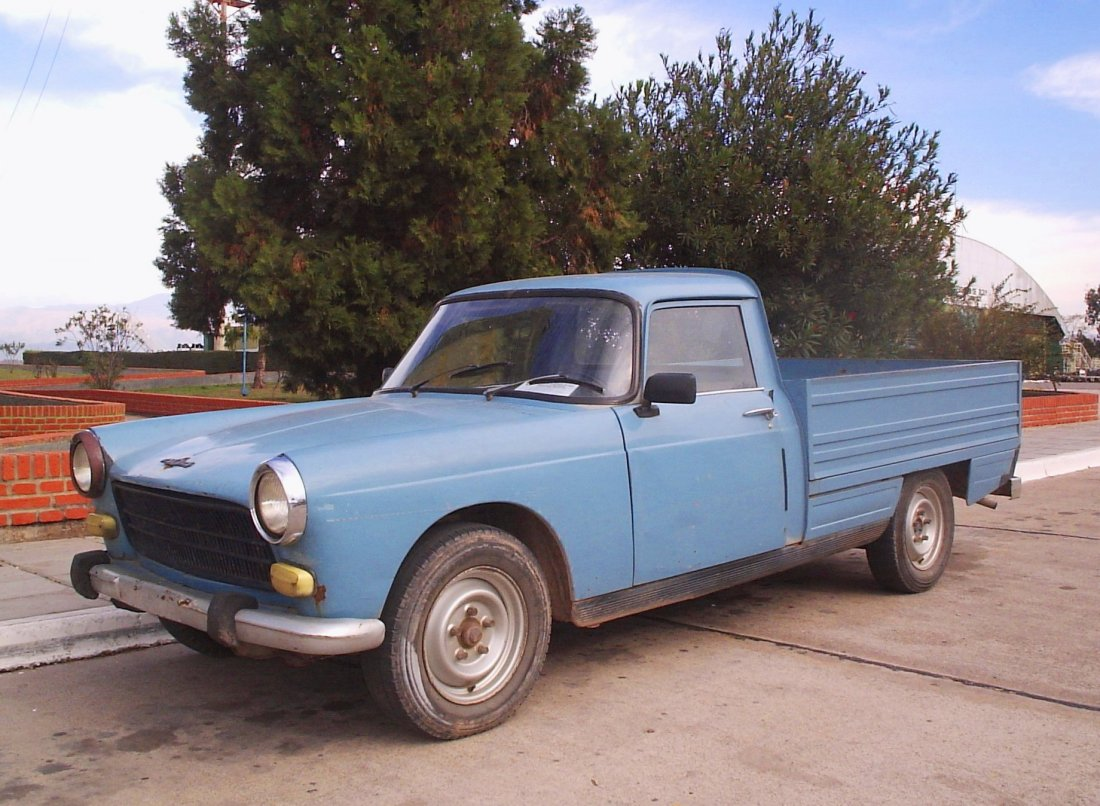
Argentine Peugeot 404 pickup (1973–1979)

== Motorsport ==
Peugeot 404s won the Safari Rally in 1963, 1966, 1967 and 1968, the latter three in Kugelfischer fuel-injected variants. In 2014, a 1963 Peugeot 404 was entered in a 24 Hours of LeMons race at Thunderhill Raceway Park, ran reliably through the 2-day event, and won the event's Index of Effluency award.

== Current usage ==
With reference to the HTTP 404 Not Found error message, many Peugeot websites use pictures of the Peugeot 404 as an Easter egg feature.

== See also ==
- Peugeot 403, the predecessor of the 404 model.
- Austin A60 and Morris Oxford, visually similar cars designed by Pininfarina for British Motor Corporation.
