= Nissan New Zealand =

Vehicle importer and distributor

Nissan New Zealand Limited
- Traded as: Public (TYO: 7201; Nasdaq: NSANY)
- Founded: 1962; 64 years ago
- Headquarters: HQ in Auckland, New Zealand, New Zealand
- Website: nissan.co.nz

Nissan New Zealand is the importer and distributor of new Nissan vehicles in New Zealand

== Local production ==
Nissan assembled a variety of vehicles in New Zealand at the Nissan plant in Wiri, South Auckland until late 1998. Complete knock down (CKD) kits were brought in from Japan and assembled in the Wiri plant. Locally produced components were also used and included items such as tyres, seats, trims, and glass.

Datsuns as they were called at the time, first came to New Zealand in 1962. In 1981 the company re-branded itself worldwide under the Nissan name.

== End of local production ==
During 1998 the government decided that tariffs on imported cars would be abolished. This led to the remaining four local assemblers (Nissan, Honda, Toyota, and Mitsubishi) to announce that they would be ceasing local production during and would concentrate on importing instead.

== List of Nissan vehicles currently for sale in New Zealand ==
Nissan Juke
Nissan Qashqai
Nissan X-Trail
Nissan Pathfinder
Nissan Patrol
Nissan Navara
Nissan Z

== Future vehicles ==
Nissan Ariya (2024)
Nissan Z Nismo (2024)
D24 Nissan Navara (TBC)
