= Mehta Group =

Indian conglomerate

The Mehta Group
- Type: Private
- Industry: Conglomerate
- Founded: 1900; 126 years ago
- Founder: Nanji Kalidas Mehta
- Headquarters: Gandhinagar, Gujarat, India
- Key people: Jay Mehta (chairman)
- Products: Manufacturing, Agriculture, Finance, Sugar, Horticulture, Cement, Plastics, Alcohol, Insurance, Consulting, Industrial Machinery
- Total assets: US$2.1 billion (2024)
- Number of employees: 55,000+ (2024)
- Website: mehtagroup.com

The Mehta Group of Companies, commonly referred to as the Mehta Group, is an Indian conglomerate based in Mumbai and headquartered in Gandhinagar, with subsidiaries in the United States, Canada, Kenya and Uganda. The group employs in excess of 55,000 people worldwide, and has an asset base in excess of US$2.1 billion, as of December 2024. The group's businesses include investments in sugar, cement, packaging, floriculture, engineering, electrical cable, consulting, management, insurance, International Trade and International Finance.

== History ==
The group, founded by Nanji Kalidas Mehta (1887–1969), who was born in India in the late 19th century. In 1900, at the age of 13 years, he migrated to Uganda and started a series of businesses that included a tea plantation, a cotton ginnery, a sugarcane plantation and a sugar factory.

During the 1930s, having established himself in Uganda, Mehta began operations in India. He set up a textile mill and ginning factory in Porbandar, Gujarat, and a trading company in Bombay. Later, a cement plant (Saurashtra Cement Limited) was established in 1956.

In 1972, Idi Amin, then leader of Uganda, expelled all Asians from the country; all of the group's Ugandan possession were surrendered, many to the government-controlled Uganda Development Corporation. The group concentrated on their non-African businesses; setting up a consultancy in India and a plastics plant in Canada becoming a truly International conglomerate during the 1970s. In 1979, Amin was removed from power and the group was invited back into Uganda to repossess their assets.

During the 1980s the Agrima Consultancy wing of the group expanded to Ethiopia, Cameroon, Sudan, Burundi, Nigeria, Nepal, Sri Lanka and Myanmar. The group rehabilitated all their Ugandan businesses during this period. A second cement plant was started in India; the Gujarat Sidhee Cement Limited.

During the 1990s the group entered the financial area by establishing Transafrica Assurance Company Limited. During this period, the cement factories in India were expanded and modernized.

== Subsidiary companies ==
The companies of the Mehta Group include, but are not limited to the following:

India

- Saurashtra Cement Limited – Ranavav, Gujarat, India
- Gujarat Sidhee Cement Limited – Sidheegram, Gujarat, India
- Agrima Consultants International Limited – Mumbai, India
- Mehta Private Limited – Mumbai, India
- Kolkata Knight Riders, India
- Global Cups & Consumables Private Limited – Kandla Port, Gujarat, India.

Uganda

- Transafrica Assurance Company Limited – Kampala, Uganda
- Transafrica Commerce Limited – Kampala, Uganda
- Sugar Corporation of Uganda Limited (SCOUL) – Lugazi, Uganda
- Lugazi Power Station – Lugazi, Uganda
- Ugma Engineering Corporation Limited – Lugazi, Uganda
- Cable Corporation Limited – Lugazi, Uganda
- Uganda Hortech Limited – Lugazi, Uganda

Kenya

- Agro Chemical and Food Company Limited – Muhoroni, Kenya
- The Mehta Group Limited – Nairobi, Kenya
- Glenn Investments Limited Nairobi, Kenya

USA

- Monarch Plastics Inc. – Kenosha, Wisconsin, United States

== See also ==
- Conglomerates
- Africa Conglomerates
- Uganda Conglomerates
- Uganda Sugar Factories
- Uganda Power Stations
