= Jon Jones (director) =

British screenwriter

- Born: Carmarthen, Carmarthenshire, Wales
- Education: National Film and Television School
- Occupations: Film and television director, screenwriter
- Children: 3
- Website: http://lastsummerfilm.com/

Jon Jones is a Welsh film and television writer and director working primarily in the United Kingdom and the United States. He has directed numerous television dramas, including the award-winning When I'm Sixty-Four (Prix Europa - Best TV Film), The Diary of Anne Frank, Blood Strangers, The Alan Clark Diaries (Director's Guild of Great Britain Best Director), A Very Social Secretary (Broadcast Press Award - Best Film), and in 2019, his feature film Last Summer won the BAFTA Cymru for best feature film.

== Career ==
=== Early work ===
Jonathan Rhys Jones first worked in the film and television industry as a carpenter, building sets for advertisements and pop promos. From there he worked his way up the art department in a variety of roles, finishing up as an art director working on a number of BBC dramas and the feature film The Young Americans, before returning to study direction at the National Film and Television School, Beaconsfield.

=== Directing ===
Upon leaving three years later, his first directing jobs were Edith's Finger, which won the BAFTA Cymru for Best Short Film, and the ITV series Cold Feet, in 2000, with his three episodes receiving an average of 9 million viewers.

He went on to direct the ITV crime drama Blood Strangers. The series was nominated for a Prix Italia television award in 2002. He went on to direct The Debt, a two-part British television crime drama film starring Warren Clarke, and Martin Freeman; When I'm Sixty Four, which won the Prix Europa in 2005 for Best Television Film, and The Alan Clark Diaries. The Alan Clark Diaries led to work on A Very Social Secretary, which was the launch film of the new UK channel More4. It won the Broadcast Press Award that year.

During 2005 Jones also directed Archangel, a Soviet thriller starring Daniel Craig. In 2006, he worked on The Secret Life of Mrs Beeton followed by Northanger Abbey in 2007.

His next direction job was The Diary of Anne Frank, which was the first production since 1959 to be given permission by the Anne Frank Fonds to use the words of Anne Frank's diary. It was made in collaboration with the Anne Frank House. He went on to direct Terry Pratchett's Going Postal in 2010, followed by Zen, with each episode reaching over 5 million viewers.

In 2012, he directed Julian Fellowes' Titanic, which won a BAFTA for best visual effects in 2013. That year, Jones directed Mr Selfridge, for ITV, Da Vinci's Demons, which won a Primetime Emmy Award, and Lawless - a legal drama screened as part of Sky's "Drama Matters", starring Suranne Jones and Lindsay Duncan. After directing ITV's The Great Fire, in 2014, he went on to direct American Odyssey for NBCUniversal, starring Anna Friel and Peter Facinelli; Legends for Fox21 and TNT with Sean Bean; Heroes Reborn for NBCUniversal and Still Star Crossed for ABC and Shondaland; and Ransom.

Last Summer was released in 2019 and was his first independently written and directed project, a coming-of-age drama set in 1970s rural Wales, praised by critics at film festivals including the Austin Film Festival and the Vancouver International Film Festival. Wales Arts Review wrote that it has "an execrable script, a confused impetus, dodgy character motivations, and a standard of cinematic conception that would get you a middling grade at a half-decent film school – it’s what #TeamWales expects. But what we cannot do is ignore the misogyny of a film that has been written, produced, developed and premiered during the most radically political era of modern filmmaking. Last Summer makes Wales look bad. It makes Welsh cinema look bad". On 13 October 2019 Last Summer won Best Feature Film at the BAFTA Cymru Awards 2019.

Also in 2019, Jones directed for Hanna, starring Mireille Enos and Joel Kinnaman for Amazon Studios. In the 2020s, Jones worked on series such as Alex Rider (2021), Hotel Portofino (2024) and Grace (2025). Most recently, he reunited with Matt Baker and directed the crime drama A Taste for Murder.

== Filmography ==
Year	Title	Notes
1999	Greek Lover	also writer
2000	Edith's Finger	
2000	Cold Feet	
2002	Blood Strangers	
2003	The Debt	
2004	When I'm Sixty-Four	
2004	The Alan Clark Diaries	also writer
2005	Archangel	
2005	A Very Social Secretary	
2006	The Secret Life of Mrs Beeton	
2007	Northanger Abbey	
2009	The Diary of Anne Frank	
2010	Going Postal	
2011	Zen	
2012	Titanic	
2013	Mr Selfridge	
2013	Rogue	
2013	Lawless	
2014	Da Vinci's Demons	
2014	The Great Fire	
2015	American Odyssey	
2015	Legends	
2016	Heroes Reborn	
2017	Ransom	
2017	Still Star-Crossed	
2018	Last Summer	also writer, producer
2019	Hanna	
2020	Strike Back	
2020	We Hunt Together	
2021	Alex Rider	
2021–2022	Whitstable Pearl	
2024	Hotel Portofino	
2025	Grace	
2026	A Taste for Murder	

== Awards ==
- BAFTA Cymru - Best Short Film (1999) For Edith's Finger
- Director's Guild of Great Britain - Outstanding Directorial Achievement in 30-Minute Television (2004) For The Alan Clark Diaries
- Broadcasting Press Guild Award - Best Single Drama (2005) For A Very Social Secretary
- BAFTA Cymru - Best Feature Film (2019) For Last Summer
