= Astrid et Raphaëlle =

Franco-Belgian crime drama television series

- Also known as: • Astrid: Murder in Paris • Astrid
- Genre: Thriller, police procedural
- Created by: Alexandre de Seguins; Laurent Burtin
- Developed by: JLA Productions; France Télévisions; Be-Films; RTBF
- Starring: Sara Mortensen; Lola Dewaere
- Theme music composer: Erwann Kermorvant
- Countries of origin: France; Belgium
- Original language: French
- No. of seasons: 6
- No. of episodes: 49

Production
- Running time: 90 minutes (pilot); 52 minutes (episodes)

Original release
- Network: France 2
- Release: 12 April 2019 – present

Astrid et Raphaëlle is a Franco-Belgian detective television series which was aired in the United Kingdom as Astrid: Murder in Paris, in Poland as Kryminalne Geniuszki, in the United States simply as Astrid, in Spain as Bright Minds, and in South Africa as Koel Kop, Warm Hart. It was created by Alexandre de Seguins and Laurent Burtin and was first broadcast on 12 April 2019 on France 2.

The series is a co-production by France Télévisions, JLA Productions, Be-Films, and RTBF (Belgian television).

It features two policewomen: Major Raphaëlle Coste (addressed as "Commander"), an impulsive police detective played by Lola Dewaere, and autistic archivist Astrid Nielsen, played by Sara Mortensen.

== Synopsis ==
As the series begins, 30-year-old Astrid Nielsen is an autistic woman who works discreetly as an archivist for the judicial police; she knows every case she has handled. She meets Raphaëlle Coste, then in charge of an investigation into the suicides of doctors. The two solitary women help each other, Astrid offering Raphaëlle a methodology and Raphaëlle offering Astrid behavioural help in return.

== Cast ==
=== Main cast ===
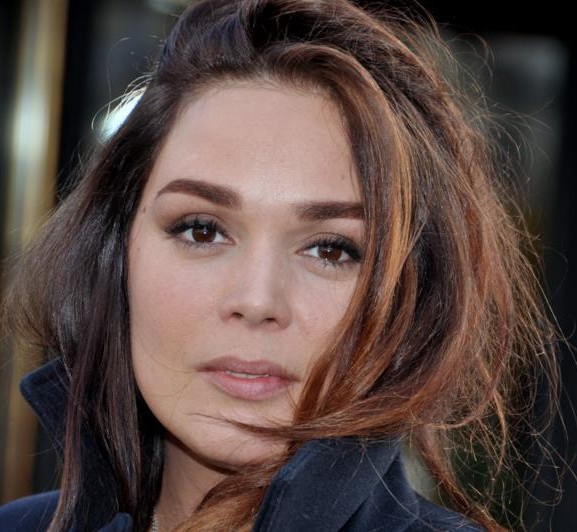
Lola Dewaere plays Commander Raphaëlle Coste

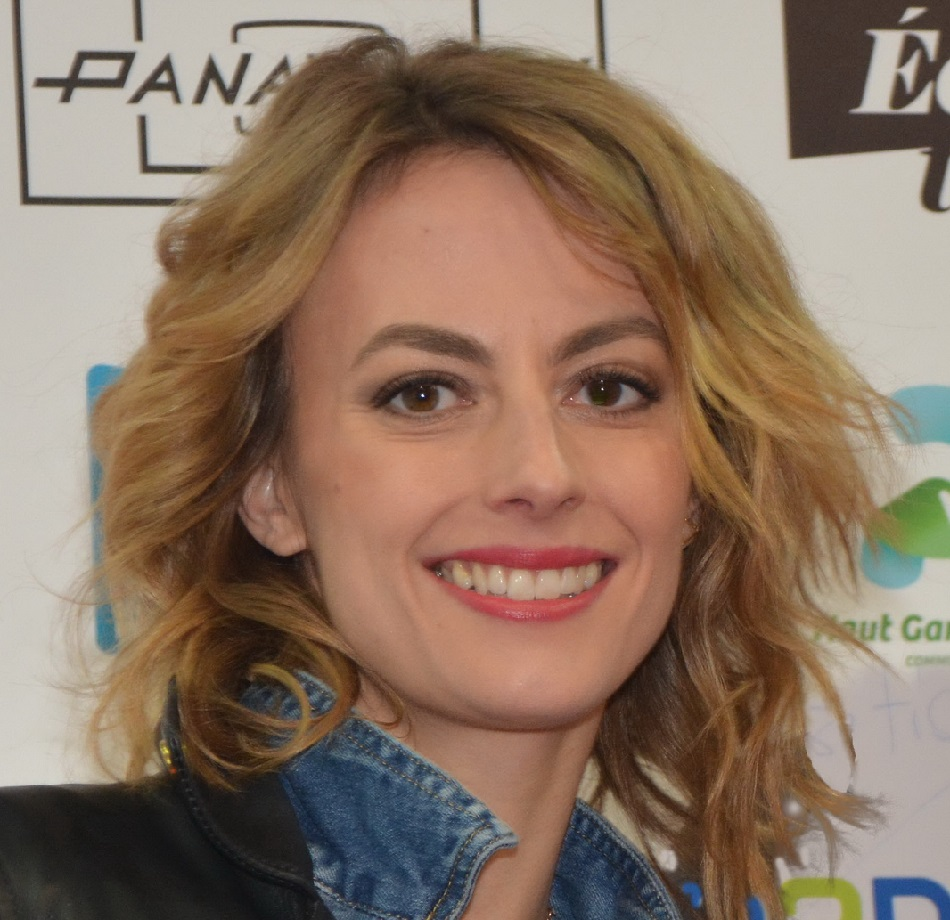
Sara Mortensen plays librarian Astrid Nielsen

Department of Judicial Police (DPJ)

- Daniel Njo Lobé (pilot) / Jean-Louis Garçon (first season on): commissaire Carl Bachert
- Lola Dewaere: Commandant Raphaëlle Coste
  - Chloé Chevallier: Raphaëlle as a child
- Benoît Michel: Captain Nicolas Perran ('Nico')
- Meledeen Yacoubi: Lieutenant Arthur Enguien (seasons 1 to 3)
- Sophia Yamna : Norah Shankar (since season 4)

Criminal documentation

- Sara Mortensen: Astrid Nielsen, documentarian
  - Sylvie Filloux: Astrid Nielsen as an adolescent
- Geoffroy Thiebaut: Alain Gaillard, director of criminal documentation and Astrid's guardian (principal season 1, guest seasons 2 and 3)
- Laurent Lévy: Gilles, criminal documentation employee (recurring season 1, guest seasons 2 and 3)

Other officials

- Husky Kihal: Henry Fournier, medical examiner
- Bruce Tessore: Julien Frédéric, police scientific technician
- Hubert Delattre: prosecutor (season 2)

Family of Astrid Nielsen

- Aliocha Itovich: Angus Nielsen, Astrid's father (recurring season 1, guest seasons 2 and 3)
- Elisabeth Mortensen: Mathilde Nielsen, Astrid's mother
- Handy Gedio : Niels, Astrid's half-brother (season 4)

Family of Raphaëlle Coste

- Timi-Joy Marbot: Théo Coste, Raphaëlle's son
- Michel Bompoil: Philippe Coste, Raphaëlle's father
- Octave Balekdjian: Benjamin Coste, Raphaëlle's older brother

Autism support group

- Jean-Benoît Souilh : William Thomas, group leader
  - Hugo Horiot : Paul Thomas, doctor and brother of William (season 1, episode 7)
  - Eléa Folcher : Camille Berezin, William's girlfriend
- Clément Lagouarde : Max
- Lizzy Brynn : Alice
- Clément Langlais : Benoît
- Angélique Bridoux : Camille (since season 3)

Others

- Kengo Saito : Tetsuo Tanaka, nephew of the grocer, then Astrid's boyfriend (since season 2)
- Akihiro Nishida : Apu Tanaka, Astrid's grocer
- Valérie Kaprisky : Anne Langlais (since season 3)

== Production ==
=== Genesis and development ===
The idea for the series arose in 2017; its producers wished to create a thriller in which a main character would be autistic. Screenwriter Alexandre de Seguins met Jean-Sébastien Bouilloux, working for producer Jean-Luc Azoulay; the pilot was accepted for broadcast on France 2, replacing the series Caïn. Hippolyte Dard and Elsa Bennet directed the pilot. Six more episodes were to be ordered if the pilot met audience targets. On April 25, 2019, Sara Mortensen announced on her Instagram account that, following the pilot's success, France 2 had ordered six 52-minute episodes: "Broadcast on April 12 last, the 90-minute pilot achieved solid ratings. The new duo of heroines from France 2 will now be entitled to an entire season. After bringing together five million viewers in April the evening of the pilot's broadcast (20.7% PDA), Astrid and Raphaëlle obtained the green light from France 2 for a season 1 consisting of six 52-minute episodes".

=== Filming ===
The Val-de-Marne departmental archives building, used as Astrid's workplace in the series

The "Documentation Criminelle" where Astrid works is in fact the building of the Departmental Archives of Val-de-Marne.

Filming for Season 1 took place between October 2019 and January 2020 for release in spring 2020.

Filming for season 2 took place from 3 August to 8 December 2020. Guest actors included Pierre Palmade, Hubert Delattre, Alysson Paradis, Gérard Majax, Ingrid Juveneton, Kentaro, and Richard Gotainer.

Filming for the first four episodes of Season 3 took place from 30 August to 28 October 2021, with guest actors Valérie Kaprisky, Stéphane Guillon, Bruno Wolkowitch, and Michaël Cohen. The last four episodes were shot from 2 November to 21 December 2021.

Filming for season 4 took place from 16 August to 6 December 2022 in Paris and adjacent regions. Announced guests included Tom Villa, Philippe Chevallier, Stomy Bugsy, Xavier Gallais, Jean-Baptiste Guégan, and Hélène Médigue.

== Broadcasts ==
In France, the pilot attracted 4.221 million viewers, or 19.5% market share, ensuring the broadcast of eight other episodes on France 2. In Belgium, the pilot attracted 236,000 viewers when it was broadcast on La Une.

The episodes in the table below are presented in the order of broadcast on France 2.

Season	Episode no.	First broadcast date	Title	Viewers	Percentage	Guest actors
Pilot	0	12 April 2019	Puzzle (Puzzle)	4,221,000	19.5%	Linda Massoz, Julien Prévost
1	1	13 March 2020	Hantise 1 (Haunted pt.1)	3,895,000	16.3%	Kamel Isker, Sarah Haxaire
1	2	13 March 2020	Hantise 2 (Haunted pt.2	3,470,000	16.4%	Charlélie Couture
1	3	20 March 2020	Chaînon manquant (Missing Link)	4,990,000	18.0%	Richard Gotainer, Benjamin Egner
1	4	20 March 2020	Chambre close (Locked Room)	4,330,000	17.6%	Stéphane Guillon, Ariel Wizman
1	5	27 March 2020	Fulcanelli (Fulcanelli)	4,760,000	17.1%	Daniel Mesguich
1	6	27 March 2020	L'homme qui n’existait pas (The Man Who Never Was)	4,260,000	17.9%	Fauve Hautot, Anne Le Nen
1	7	3 April 2020	La Mort et Compagnie (Death & Co)	5,243,000	18.2%	Raphael Mezrahi, Hugo Horiot
1	8	3 April 2020	Invisible (Invisible)	4,750,000	19.1%	Vincent Moscato, Gérard Miller
2	1	21 May 2021	L'Étourneau (The Starling)	5,225,000	21.9%	Pierre Palmade, Gérard Majax
2	2	21 May 2021	Irezumi (Irezumi)	4,480,000	20.6%	Richard Gotainer, Kentaro
2	3	28 May 2021	Le Paradoxe de Fermi (Fermi Paradox)	5,060,000	21.7%	Alysson Paradis, Viktor Vincent
2	4	28 May 2021	Point d'orgue (Fermata)	4,520,000	20.7%	Ingrid Juveneton, Brigitte Aubry
2	5	4 June 2021	Circé (Circe)	5,254,000	22.0%	Sophie Duez, Louisy Joseph, Sébastien Chartier
2	6	4 June 2021	Golem (Golem)	4,750,000	22.0%	Mathieu Delarive, Avy Marciano, Félicité Chaton
2	7	11 June 2021	Le livre (The Book)	4,367,000	19.6%	Tom Novembre, Paloma Coquant, Michel Bompoil
2	8	11 June 2021	En garde à vue (In Custody)	4,170,000	19.5%	Émilie Dequenne, Hugo Horiot
3	1	26 August 2022	Plan global (Global Plan)	5,070,000	28.4%	Camille de Pazzis, Michaël Cohen
3	2	26 August 2022	Memento Mori (Memento Mori)	4,650,000	28.8%	Caroline Le Moing, Bruno Wolkowitch
3	3	2 September 2022	Natifs (Natives)	5,366,000	27.3%	Valérie Kaprisky, Ben Feitelson, Lola Le Lann
3	4	2 September 2022	La Chambre ouverte (The Open Room)	4,680,000	27.0%	Catherine Zavlav, Stéphane Guillon
3	5	9 September 2022	Témoin (Witness)	5,596,000	28.6%	Lilou Fogli, Aksel Rivière
3	6	9 September 2022	Sang d'or (Golden Blood)	4,870,000	28.1%	Florence Thomassin, Ivan Franek
3	7	16 September 2022	Les Fleurs du mal (The Flowers of Evil)	5,390,000	26.8%	Virginie Kartner, Philippe Duquesne
3	8	23 September 2022	En souterrain (Underground)	5,182,000	25.2%	Olivier Rabourdin, Roger Carnillac
4	1	10 November 2023	L'Œil du dragon (Eye of the Dragon)	5,490,000	27.7%	Tom Villa, Bernard Chabin, Damien Boisseau, Angèle Rohé
4	2	10 November 2023	Les 1001 nuits (The Arabian Nights)	4,620,000	26.2%	Philippe Chevalier, Nassima Benchicou, Mylène Tombonato, Shady Nafar
4	3	17 November 2023	10 000 mètres (30,000 feet)	5,360,000	26.4%	Magali Heu, Stomy Bugsy, Jean-Baptiste Guegan, Guillaume Toucas
4	4	24 November 2023	Immortel (Immortal)	5,110,000	26.5%	Philippe Chevallier, Xavier Gallais, Ruben Badinter, Dorothée Brière
4	5	1 December 2023	Le sacrifice du fou (Madman's Sacrifice)	5,180,000	25.9%	Philippe Chevallier, David Strajmayster, Damien Jouillerot, Sacha Tarantovich
4	6	8 December 2023	La passagère du temps (Time Traveller)	5,390,000	27.7%	Franck Sémonin, Julie Delarme, Augustin Bonhomme, Sabine Perraud
4	7	15 December 2023	L'Ankou (The Ankou)	5,020,000	24.9%	Philippe Chevallier, Stéphane Boucher, Marie-Ange Casta, Théo Curin
4	8	22 December 2023	Coupable (Guilty)	5,160,000	25.5%	Catherine Marchal, Lola Marois, Christophe Mazière, Ludovic Laroche
5	1	8 November 2024	On ne meurt qu'une seule fois (You only die once)	5,470,000	28.7%	Lorie Pester, Aurélien Wiik
5	2	8 November 2024	Mais c'est pour si longtemps (But it's for so long)	5,190,000	30.5%	Lorie Pester, Aurélien Wiik
5	3	15 November 2024	Mandala (Mandala)	4,610,000	23.6%	Emmanuel Dorand, Jacky Nercessian
5	4	22 November 2024	Le dernier des Aztèques (The last of the Aztecs)	4,550,000	21.9%	Kevin Meffre, Charles Clément
5	5	29 November 2024	Le baptême des morts (The baptism of the dead)	4,514,000	24.5%	Jérôme Pauwels, Ariane Zantain, Sarah-Cheyenne Santoni
5	6	6 December 2024	Loup y es-tu ? (Are you there, wolf?)	5,157,000	27.8%	Charlotte Gaccio, Doudou Masta, Nafy Souare
5	7	13 December 2024	On achève bien les jockeys	4,843,000	24.6%	Lara Tavella, Védian Campo
5	8	20 December 2024	Un mariage et quatre enterrements (A wedding and four funerals)	4,777,000	24.4%	Alex Goude, Stéphane Guillon
6	1	24 October 2025	La mort de Raphaelle (The death of Raphaelle)			
6	2	31 October 2025	Le pensionnat (The Boarding School)			
6	3	7 November 2025	Le Boli Maudit (The Cursed Boli)			
6	4	12 November 2025	La Theorie du Tout (The Theory of Everything)			
6	5	19 November 2025	Coup(s) de Theatre (Plot Twist(s))			
6	6	19 November 2025	La part du diable (The Devil's Share)			
6	7	26 November 2025	La veuve (The Widow)			
6	8	26 November 2025	Le testament (The Testament)			

Highest audience
Lowest audience

The Puzzle pilot was rebroadcast on France 2 on Friday 10 April 2020, drawing 4,885,000 viewers, an 18.3% market share.

The show has also been broadcast in the United States and the UK, through the Walter presents project on More 4 in more recent years, and earlier series were shown on the Welsh language channel S4C as "Astrid et Raphaëlle" with burnt in Welsh language subtitles together with optional English subtitles available.

== Reviews ==
According to Julia Fernandez of Allociné, the group discussion scene between autistic people is one of the most successful scenes in the pilot, the weakness of this episode residing in a certain predictability of the police investigation's outcome.

During the broadcast of the pilot, the Belgian magazine Moustique noted a strong resemblance to the American series The Good Doctor: "Like Shaun Murphy, Astrid is going through a difficult family situation but can count on the help of her tutor. Like the young doctor, she came out of the isolation caused by her atypical neurology—thanks to her job—but must regularly face the incomprehension of those who do not know".

At the start of the first season, this magazine insisted on the difficulty for the screenwriters to invent stories involving "disabled characters": "They have to slalom between the interest of the story, respect for political correctness and the concern to avoid caricature, into which it is easy to fall for the pleasure of a moment of emotion or a funny scene". The journalist considers the gamble rather successful: "Without avoiding all the pitfalls, the series really holds up and manages to treat Astrid's autism only as an element and not a definition of the young woman".

== Features ==
According to Lola Dewaere, this thriller allows "another look at difference". Astrid resembles a female Sherlock Holmes.

According to one of the writers, Alexandre de Seguins, Astrid, whom he wants as far as possible from the cliché autistic genius, is inspired by the works of Temple Grandin, which revealed to him "the elements of her way of seeing the world, the difficulties of everyday life". He was also inspired by his meeting and discussions with Josef Schovanec as well as a dozen autistic people who read and commented on the texts of the episodes.

One of the three co-authors of the series has been diagnosed with Asperger syndrome, a term formerly used to describe a "milder" form of autism. Autistic actor Hugo Horiot plays a non-autistic character in season 1 episode 7.

== British remake ==
On February 27, 2024, Matt Baker was announced as the lead writer on Patience, an English-language adaptation of the series. The series has funding from PBS and Beta Film and stars Laura Fraser in the Raphaelle part and Ella Maisy Purvis, who is autistic, in the Astrid role. It aired on Channel 4 in January 2025.

== Bibliography ==
- Julia Baudin, "Astrid and Raphaëlle: France 2 dares to be atypical. The channel is launching a pilot built on a tandem of heroines, one of whom is autistic and the other completely unmanageable", TV Magazine, Le Figaro, Paris, 7 April 2019, p. 12.
