= Sabine Pakora =

French-Ivorian actress

- Born: Ivory Coast
- Occupation: actress
- Years active: 2006–present

Sabine Pakora is a French-Ivorian actress.

== Early life and career ==
Sabine Pakora studied acting at the Ecole supérieur d’art dramatique de Paris and Conservatoire d’Art Dramatique de Montpellier.

== Filmography ==
Year	Title	Role	Director	Notes
2011	Tales of the Night	The cook	Michel Ocelot	
2011	Le jour où tout a basculé	Alimata	Thierry Esteves Pinto	TV series (1 episode)
2012	Stalingrad Lovers	Ghetto user	Fleur Albert	
2012	Vole comme un papillon	Jahia	Jérôme Maldhé	
2012	Kirikou and the Men and Women	Strong / Neutral Woman	Michel Ocelot	
2012	Passage du Désir	The hairdresser	Jérôme Foulon	TV movie
2013	Des étoiles	Fanta	Dyana Gaye	
2013	Aya of Yop City	Koro / Modestine	Marguerite Abouet & Clément Oubrerie	
2013	WorkinGirls	Corinne	Sylvain Fusée	TV series (1 episode)
2014	Samba	Gracieuse	Éric Toledano and Olivier Nakache	
2014	1001 Grams	Observer	Bent Hamer	
2014	Les Trois Frères, le retour	The nurse	Les Inconnus	
2014	Assemblée générale	Madame Dupont	Luc Moullet	Short
2014	Lascars	Madame Traore	Barthélémy Grossmann	TV series (1 episode)
2014	Profilage	Nanny 2	Julien Despaux	TV series (1 episode)
2014	Ma pire angoisse	The customs officer	Vladimir Rodionov	TV series (1 episode)
2015	Papa lumière	The matron	Ada Loueilh	
2015	The Final Lesson	Victoria	Pascale Pouzadoux	
2015	Alice	Christine	Ronan Denecé & Jean-Baptiste Legrand	Short
2015	Ainsi soient-ils	Fatou	Rodolphe Tissot	TV series (2 episodes)
2016	Orphan	The prison guard	Arnaud des Pallières	
2016	Dieumerci !	The prostitute	Lucien Jean-Baptiste	
2016	The Boss's Daughter	Gladys	Olivier Loustau	
2017	Baby Bumps	Justine	Noémie Saglio	
2017	De plus belle	Sabine	Anne-Gaëlle Daval	
2017	Il a déjà tes yeux	Madame Diakité	Lucien Jean-Baptiste	
2017	La deuxième étoile	Marie-Jo	Lucien Jean-Baptiste	
2018	I Feel Better	The prostitute	Jean-Pierre Améris	
2018	Love Addict	The Marabou	Frank Bellocq	
2018	La Fête des mères	A housewife	Marie-Castille Mention-Schaar	
2018	Tout seul	Tourist	Antoine Laurens	Short
2019	Sun	The cashier	Jonathan Desoindre & Ella Kowalska	
2019	Damien veut changer le monde	State Officer 1	Xavier De Choudens	
2019	Black Snake, la légende du serpent noir	Billy	Thomas N'Gijol & Karole Rocher	
2019	Karmen	Karmen	Théo Groia	Short
2019	Itinéraire d'une maman braqueuse	Louloute	Alexandre Castagnetti	TV movie
2019	En Famille	Dame patronesse	Christelle D'Aulnat & Thomas Lipmann	TV series (1 episode)
2019	Astrid et Raphaëlle	The Voodoo	Elsa Bennett & Hippolyte Dard	TV series (1 episode)
2020	Fantasme	Doctor Lepic	Éléonore Costes	
2020	Villa Caprice	Madame Bazouma	Bernard Stora	
2020	H24	The ophthalmologist	Nicolas Herdt	TV series (1 episode)
2020	Il a déjà tes yeux	Madame Diakité	Lucien Jean-Baptiste	TV series (1 episode)
2021	Luther		David Morley	TV series (1 episode)
2021	Frérots	The hairdresser	Frank Bellocq	TV series (1 episode)
2021	L'école de la vie	Alessandro's mother	Elsa Bennett & Hippolyte Dard	TV series (1 episode)
2022	Le monde de demain	Angry mother	Hélier Cisterne & Katell Quillévéré	TV series (1 episode)
2022	Le juge est une femme	Ambre Diop	Chris Briant	TV series (2 episodes)
2022	L'amour (presque) parfait	Nathalie	Pascale Pouzadoux	TV series (6 episodes)
2023	The Walking Dead: Daryl Dixon	Sonia	Tim Southam	TV series (1 episode)

== Theatre ==
Year	Title	Author	Director
2006-2007	Outre-ciel	Gustave Akakpo	Anne Sylvie Meyza & Luis Marqués
2007	Don Giovanni	Wolfgang Amadeus Mozart	Michael Haneke
2007-2009	Kirikou et Karaba	Michel Ocelot	Wayne McGregor
2008	La Dispute	Pierre de Marivaux	Nicolas Gros
2008	Paradis	José Montalvo	José Montalvo & Dominique Hervieu
2009	Doubt: A Parable	John Patrick Shanley	Véronique Fauconnet
2009	Juste une Ombre au Tableau	Laurent Contamin	Jérôme Varanfrain
2009	Une Iliade	René Zahnd	Hassane Kassi Kouyaté
2010	Tabataba	Bernard-Marie Koltès	Félix Blottian
2010	Porgy and Bess	George Gershwin	José Montalvo & Dominique Hervieu
2011	The Blacks	Jean Genet	Françoise de Salle
2011	The Trojan Women	Euripides	Laurence Bourdil
2012	Odyssées	Gustave Akakpo	Michel Burstin
2013	Don Quichotte du Trocadéro	José Montalvo	José Montalvo
2019	Dans les cordes	Pauline Ribat	Pauline Ribat
