= Sara Mortensen =

French actress (born 1979)

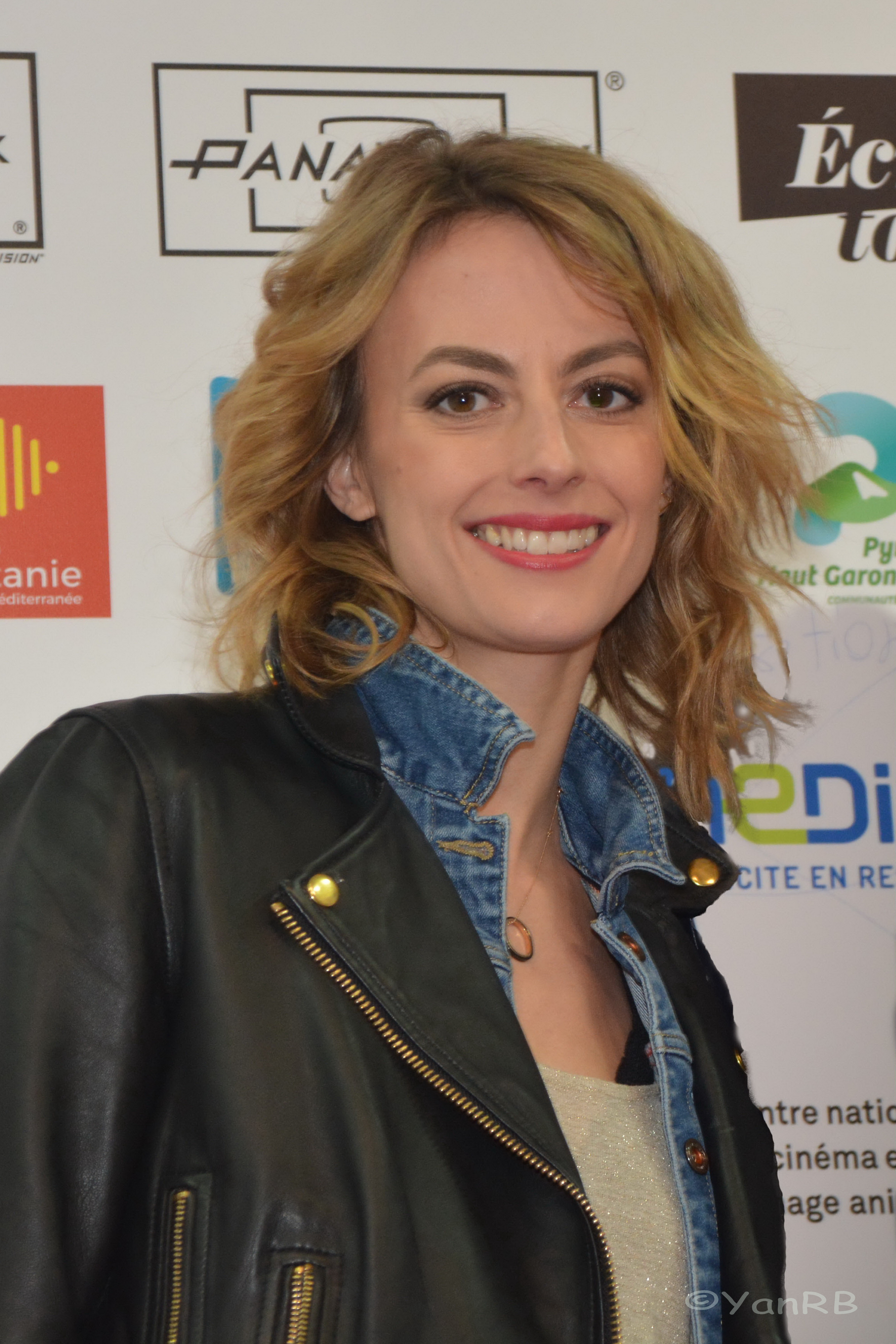
Sara Mortensen in 2018

Sara Mortensen (born 10 December 1979) is a French actress.

She is known for her role as Coralie Blain in the television series Plus belle la vie, and that of the young autistic criminology expert, Astrid Nielsen, in Astrid et Raphaëlle. She has also appeared in the recurring lead role of Captain Emma Thélier, in the police TV series Les Mystères de..., as well as in several other series and numerous TV movies and films.

== Early life, family and education ==
Sara Mortensen was born on 10 December 1979 in Paris to Maxime Ferrier, a plastic artist, and Elisabeth Mortensen, a Norwegian actress, theater teacher, and director. Sara is fluent in French, Norwegian, and English. After attending the École Internationale Bilingue and a year of hypokhâgne (an academic programme), she obtained a master's degree in history. She joined the Cours Florent drama school from 2001 to 2004 and directed a short film: Facteur chance.

== Acting career ==
Sara Mortensen has performed in theater, television and film. She has appeared in several series: Spiral, Femmes de loi (2008), Joséphine, ange gardien (2014), Clem (2015) and in the movies 15 ans et demi (2008), Un homme et son chien (2009), 30° Couleur (2012), Les Trois Frères : le retour (2014), Vicky (2015), Good Luck Algeria and L'Idéal (2016) by Frédéric Beigbeder. In 2016, she played Cindy, a cook and rock singer, in season 2 of Chefs and then Kristina in Il a déjà tes yeux. In 2017, she played a policewoman in season 2 of Contact, on TF1 then in 2018 and 2019, in the TV movies Les Mystères de la basilique (with Isabel Otero), then in Les Mystères du Bois Galant and Les Mystères de l'école de gendarmerie, on France 3, from 2018 to 2020.

In June 2019, her participation in Plus belle la vie was discontinued, and she was replaced by Coralie Audret. She plays Astrid Nielsen, an autistic documentalist, in the police series Astrid et Raphaëlle; Mortensen's mother Elisabeth Mortensen plays Astrid's mother.

== Personal life ==
Sara Mortensen is in a relationship with Bruce Tessore who plays Nicolas Berger in Plus belle la vie, whom she met during the shooting of the series. She has a son from an earlier relationship.

== Filmography ==
=== Film ===
==== Cinema ====
- 2008: 15 ans et demi de François Desagnat et Thomas Sorriaux : Barbara
- 2008: Un homme et son chien de Francis Huster
- 2012: 30° Couleur de Lucien Jean-Baptiste et Philippe Larue : l'universitaire blonde
- 2014: Les Trois Frères : Le Retour de Didier Bourdon, Bernard Campan et Pascal Légitimus : femme du couple Miss Moss
- 2015: Good Luck Algeria de Farid Bentoumi : directrice financière équipementier
- 2015: Vicky de Denis Imbert : Pauline
- 2016: Et pourquoi pas? de Nicolas Fay et Blanche Pinon (short film) : Virginie
- 2016: Il a déjà tes yeux de Lucien Jean-Baptiste : Kristina
- 2016: L'Idéal de Frédéric Beigbeder
- 2017: Honni soit qui mal y pense de Sarah-Laure Estragnat (short film) : la quatrième femme
- 2017: La Deuxième Étoile de Lucien Jean-Baptiste : Brigitte, la scoring girl
- 2018: Pupille de Jeanne Herry : la femme au visage émacié
- 2021: Déflagrations de Vanya Peirani-Vignes : Camille

=== Television ===
==== Series ====
- 2007: Paris, enquêtes criminelles - l'assistante Magalie (Season 1, Episode 7)
- 2008: Engrenage - Marina Soltes (Season 2, Episode 2)
- 2009: La vie est à nous - Elsa (7 episodes)
- 2009: Femmes de loi - Helle (Season 9, Episode 6)
- 2009: Palizzi (Season 2, Episode 42)
- 2011: Victor Sauvage - Isabelle (Season 1, Episode 3)
- 2011: Le Jour où tout a basculé - Maud (Season 1, Episode 56)
- 2012: Valérie Marauni (3 episodes)
- 2012–2019: Plus belle la vie - Coralie Blain (261 episodes)
- 2013: VDM, la série (3 episodes)
- 2015J: Joséphine, ange gardien - Amélie Spontini (Season 16, Episode 4)
- 2016: Chefs - Cindy (8 episodes)
- 2017: Contact - Louise Martel (4 episodes)
- 2017: Nina - Clara (Season 3, Episode 9)
- 2017: On va s'aimer un peu, beaucoup... - Kim Rufo (Season 1, Episode 8)
- 2019: Cassandre - Chloé Vannier (Season 3, Episode 3)
- 2019: Astrid et Raphaëlle - Astrid Nielsen (49 episodes)
- 2020: Il a déjà tes yeux - Kristina (2 episodes)
- 2020: L'Art du crime - Estelle Domani (Season 4, Episode 2)
- 2021: Crimes parfaits - Solène Guillou (Season 3, Episode 11, "Sur un arbre perché")
- 2022: L'Abîme – Elsa Lacaze
- 2022: Tropiques criminels - Sandra Gauthier (Season 3, Episode 3)

==== Television films ====
- 2010: 4 garçons dans la nuit - Hélène Caron
- 2011: Ni vu, ni connu - Martine
- 2013: Le Déclin de l'empire masculin - Armelle
- 2018: Les Mystères de la basilique - Émilie
- 2019: Les Mystères du Bois Galant - Emma Thélier
- 2021: Les Mystères de l'école de gendarmerie - Emma Thélier
- 2022: Le Saut du diable 2 : le Sentier des loups de Julien Seri - Gabrielle Martinot
- 2023: Meurtres à Bayeux
- 2024: Meurtres aux Marquises
- 2025: Filip
