= Michel Jonasz =

French composer-songwriter

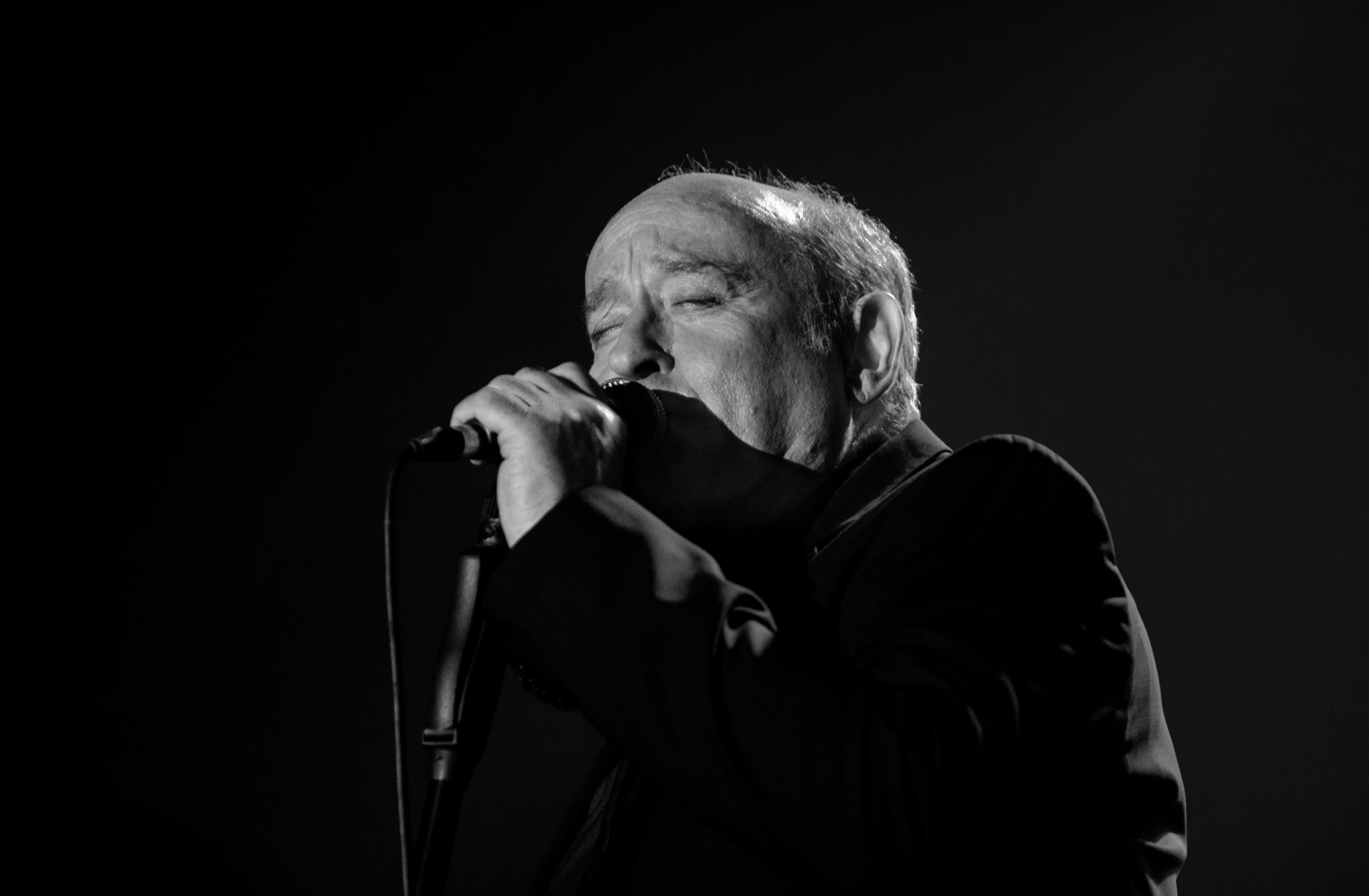
- Jonasz in 2017
- Born: 21 January 1947 (age 78); Drancy, France
- Occupation(s): composer-songwriter, singer, actor

Michel Jonasz (born 21 January 1947 in Drancy, France) is a French composer-songwriter, singer and actor. His compositions include: La boîte de jazz, Joueurs de blues and Les vacances au bord de la mer.

Born of Hungarian immigrant parents, Michel Jonasz left school at the age of 15 to find his way in the arts. Painting, theatre and music interested him, but he began his artistic career as a pianist. After working with both Vigon and The Lemons, in 1966 he created the band King Set with his friend, the guitarist Alain Goldstein.

Two radio successes made his voice and his talent for rhythm known: an original composition, Apesanteur (Weightlessness), in 1967, and Jezebel in 1968.

His solo career began slowly with a single ("45t") at the end of 1968 under the name of Michel Kingset, the next in 1970 under his own name. He had to wait until 1974 to find a large audience with two simultaneous hits ("tubes"): Dites-Moi and Super Nana.

== Discography ==
=== Albums ===
- 1974 : Michel Jonasz
- 1975 : Changez tout
- 1977 : Michel Jonasz
- 1978 : Guigui
- 1979 : Les années 80 commencent
- 1981 : La Nouvelle Vie
- 1983 : Tristesse
- 1985 : Unis vers l'uni
- 1988 : La Fabuleuse Histoire de Mister Swing
- 1992 : Où est la source
- 1996 : Soul Music Airlines
- 2000 : Pôle Ouest
- 2002 : Où vont les rêves
- 2005 : Michel Jonasz
- 2007 : Chanson française
- 2011 : Les Hommes sont toujours des enfants
- 2019 : La Méouge, le Rhône, La Durance
- 2023 : Chanter le Blues

== Filmography ==
=== Film ===
- 1979 : Rien ne va plus directed by Jean-Michel Ribes
- 1981 : Qu'est-ce qui fait courir David ? directed by Élie Chouraqui
- 1984 : Tir à vue directed by Marc Angelo
- 1988 : Le Testament d'un poète juif assassiné directed by Frank Cassenti
- 1999 : Babel directed by Gérard Pullicino
- 1999 : Une pour toutes directed by Claude Lelouch
- 2001 : Lisa directed by Pierre Grimblat
- 2003 : Le Tango des Rashevski directed by Sam Garbarski
- 2004 : Mariage avec mon fils directed by Pierre Berecz
- 2004 : La Vie dehors directed by Jean-Pierre Vergne
- 2006 : La maison de Nina directed by Richard Dembo
- 2007 : Deux Vies plus une directed by Idit Cebula
- 2008 : Les Hauts Murs directed by Christian Faure
- 2008 : La Première Étoile directed by Lucien Jean-Baptiste
- 2013 : Rue Mandar directed by Idit Cebula
- 2013 : Un excellent dossier ! directed by Artus de Penguern
- 2014 : ADN, l'âme de la terre directed by Thierry Obadia
- 2016 : Dieumerci ! directed by Lucien Jean-Baptiste
- 2017 : Il a déjà tes yeux directed by Lucien Jean-Baptiste
- 2017 : Baby Phone directed by Olivier Casas
- 2017 : La Deuxième Étoile directed by Lucien Jean-Baptiste
- 2018 : Au bout des doigts directed by Ludovic Bernard
- 2019 : Roxane directed by Mélanie Auffret
- 2020 : Les Vétos directed by Julie Manoukian
- 2020 : Vagabondes directed by Philippe Dajoux

=== Television ===
- 2005 : Dalida directed by Joyce Buñuel

Preceded by first winner	Victoires de la Musique; Male artist of the year 1985	Succeeded by Jean-Jacques Goldman
