= Firmine Richard =

French actress (born 1947)

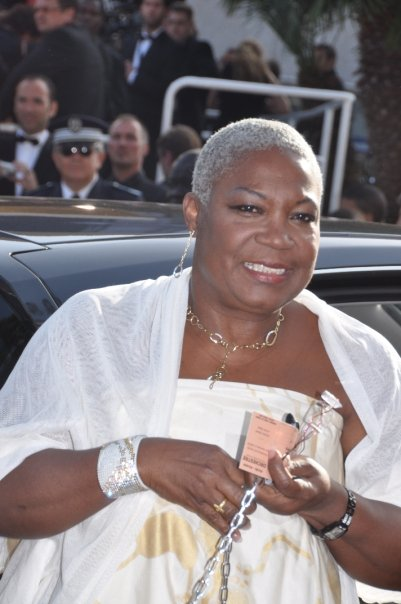
- Firmine Richard at the 2009 Cannes Film Festival
- Born: 25 September 1947 (age 78); Pointe-à-Pitre, Guadeloupe, France
- Occupation: Actress
- Years active: 1989–present

Firmine Richard (born 25 September 1947 Pointe-à-Pitre, Guadeloupe, France) is a French actress. Her film credits include 8 Women and Hunting and Gathering.

== Personal life ==
In February 2009, Richard took part in demonstrations in Paris in support of the 2009 French Caribbean general strikes in Guadeloupe and Martinique.

Her son, Keneff Leauva, is serving 19 years in jail for murder and has been sentenced 8 times before, including a previous sentence for a homophobic assault for which he served 1 year in jail

== Theater ==
Year	Title	Author	Director	Notes
1991	Roberto Zucco	Bernard-Marie Koltès	Bruno Boëglin	Théâtre de la Ville
1998	Mémoire d'isles	Ina Césaire	Jean-Camille Sormain	Théâtre Hébertot
1999	The Adventures of Pinocchio	Carlo Collodi	Bruno Boëglin (2)	Odéon-Théâtre de l'Europe
2006	A Respectable Wedding	Bertolt Brecht	Philippe Adrien	Théâtre de la Tempête
2008	Le Vol de Kitty Hawk	Georges Dupuis	Yves Pignot	Théâtre 13
2008	Trames	Gerty Dambury	Gerty Dambury	Artchipel
2010	Famille de stars	Rémi Rosello	Rémi Rosello	Tour
2014	Tree of Life	Maryse Condé	José Jermidier	Festival d'Avignon
2015	Gospel sur la Colline	Benjamin Faleynas	Jean-Luc Moreau	Folies Bergère

== Filmography ==
Year	Title	Role	Director	Notes
1989	Mama, There's a Man in Your Bed	Juliette Bonaventure	Coline Serreau	
1990	Tolgo il disturbo	Anita	Dino Risi	
1993	Commissaire Dumas d'Orgheuil: John	Séraphine Risette	Philippe Setbon	TV movie
1993	J'aime pas qu'on m'aime	The nurse	Stéphane Kurc	TV movie
1993	Flash - Le reporter-photographe	Mutter Toue	Philippe Triboit	TV series (1 episode)
1995	Élisa	Queen Wee-Wee	Jean Becker	
1996	Antoine	Juana	Jérôme Foulon	TV movie
1996	L'amerloque	Winnie Butler	Jean-Claude Sussfeld	TV movie
1997	Mira la magnifique		Agnès Delarive	TV movie
1997	Les petites		Wanda Kujacz	Short
1998	Riches, belles, etc...		Bunny Schpoliansky	Short
1998	L'honneur de ma famille		Rachid Bouchareb	TV movie
1998	Fugue en ré	Rose Bonaventure	Christian Faure	TV movie
1998	L'amour noir		Liliane Watbled Guenoun	Short
1998	La kiné	Esther	Thierry Lassalle	TV series (7 episodes)
1999	One 4 All	The handmaid of the president	Claude Lelouch	
1999	Une journée de merde !	Sabine's mother	Miguel Courtois	
2000	Léopold	Madame Mae	Joël Séria	TV movie
2000	Suite en ré	Rose	Christian Faure (2)	TV movie
2000-07	Le grand patron	Solange / Florence Gentil	Christian Bonnet, Claudio Tonetti & ...	TV series (15 episodes)
2001	8 Women	Madame Chanel	François Ozon	Silver Bear – Outstanding Artistic Achievement; European Film Award for Best Actress; Nominated - Online Film Critics Society - Best Ensemble
2001	Fils de Zup	Lulu	Gilles Romera	
2002	3 zéros	Rose	Fabien Onteniente	
2002	Ein Albtraum von 3½ Kilo	Mathilda Mâhl	Uwe Janson	TV movie
2003	Simon le juste	Madame traoré	Gérard Mordillat	TV movie
2003	Par amour	Bernadette Chabot	Alain Tasma	TV movie
2003	Laverie de famille		Frédéric Demont	TV series
2003	Mon beau sapin		Diane Morel	Short
2004	Pédale dure	The midwife	Gabriel Aghion	
2004	Courrier du coeur	Yvonne Merieux	Christian Faure (3)	TV movie
2005	Dans tes rêves	Nicaise	Denis Thybaud	
2005	Les Parrains	Claudia	Frédéric Forestier	
2005	L'homme qui voulait passer à la télé		Amar Arhab & Fabrice Michelin	TV movie
2005	La famille Zappon	Emilie	Amar Arhab & Fabrice Michelin (2)	TV movie
2007	Hunting and Gathering	Mamadou	Claude Berri	
2007	Trivial	The head nurse	Sophie Marceau	
2007	Vous êtes de la police ?	Chantal Dumas	Romuald Beugnon	
2007	Big City	Black Mama	Djamel Bensalah	
2007	Confidences	Sexologist	Laurent Dussaux	TV mini-series
2009	La Première Étoile	Marie-Therese Louise-Joseph	Lucien Jean-Baptiste	
2009	Opération Saint-Esprit	Mme Germain	Séverine Ferrer	Short
2010	Retour au pays		Dalle Julien	
2010	Je vous aime très beaucoup	The Nonna	Philippe Locquet	
2011	Un baiser papillon	The nurse	Karine Silla	
2011	A Happy Event	The midwife	Rémi Bezançon	
2011	Les Tribulations d'une caissière	Sandy	Pierre Rambaldi	
2011	Tales of the Night	Voice	Michel Ocelot	
2011	Un pas en avant - Les dessous de la corruption	Délalie's mother	Sylvestre Amoussou	
2011	Aïcha	Madame Ginette	Yamina Benguigui	TV series (1 episode)
2011	Soulwash	The grandmother	Douglas Attal	Short
2011-13	Famille d'accueil	Marguerite	Alain Wermus, Philippe Olari & ...	TV series (23 episodes)
2012	Bowling	Firmine	Marie-Castille Mention-Schaar	
2012	Solitudes	The psychologist	Liova Jedlicki	Short
2012	Nos chers voisins	Lucie		TV series (1 episode)
2013	De Grâce !	Maid	Yvan Delatour	Short
2013	Les îles d'en face	Rose	Philippe Giangreco & Gwendal Pointeau	TV series
2014	Rosenn		Yvan Le Moine	
2014	Coup de coeur	Yolande	Dominique Ladoge	TV movie
2015	Le grand partage	Philomena	Alexandra Leclère	
2015	Serial Teachers 2	Madame Saint-Gilles	Pierre-François Martin-Laval	
2015	Family Show	Hermeline Clement	Pascal Lahmani	TV movie
2015	Frères d'armes		Rachid Bouchareb (2)	TV mini-series
2016	Dieumerci !	Marie-Thérèse	Lucien Jean-Baptiste	
2017	La deuxième étoile	Bonne Maman	Lucien Jean-Baptiste	
2019	Mortel	Elizebeth	Simon Astier & Edouard Salier	TV series
