= Matt Baker (screenwriter) =

British screenwriter

- Occupation: Screenwriter
- Known for: Hotel Portofino; Professor T. Before We Die; Suspect

Matt Baker is a British television screenwriter, best known for creating the period television series Hotel Portofino and several successful English-language adaptations of foreign-language dramas.

== Early life and education ==
Baker grew up in Pocklington, East Yorkshire, and attended Pocklington School from 1979 to 1986. He subsequently studied English literature and drama at Goldsmiths, University of London, before beginning his career in journalism.

== Career ==
=== Journalism ===
Baker first worked as a journalist, starting at the Kent Messenger local newspaper group in Maidstone before going on to edit Broadcast magazine and acting as media editor for the relaunch of Sunday Business. Subsequently, he became chief press officer of Channel 4 Television and later its head of press and publicity, going on to take-up senior corporate communication roles with Oxfam GB and ViacomCBS. During the first COVID-19 pandemic lockdown, Baker decided to make a career change and focus exclusively on writing for television.

=== Writing for TV ===
Baker's first broadcast credit was on an animated short of Quentin Blake's Clown, which aired on Channel 4 on Christmas Day in 2020. He went on to adapt and write an English-language remake of Before We Die, starring Lesley Sharp, which aired on Channel 4 in 2021, and co-wrote a second series in 2023. He adapted and wrote two further remakes of foreign-language dramas - an English-language adaptation of Suspect (Danish: Forhøret), and a re-imagining of the Belgian series, Professor T. On 6 October 2021, it was announced that Professor T. had been renewed by ITV for a second series, which premiered on 16 September 2022. In 2023, it was renewed for a third series, but with Stephen Brady taking over as lead writer of the series after Baker moved on to work on new projects.

In 2022, Baker created and wrote his first original series, the ITV period drama Hotel Portofino, about an aristocratic British family moving to a resort town in the Italian Riviera to run a hotel in the 1920s, while the nation is dealing with political turmoil. Baker's love of Italy and the topicality of the historical period's political issues inspired him to create the show, workshopping characters and scenarios with Eagle Eye executives Walter Iuzzolino and Jo McGrath, who later produced the series. The show was renewed for a second and for a third season, and has sold around the world, in a broad range of international markets including PBS in the U.S., Foxtel in Australia, and Sky Italia and RAI in Italy, as well as across Scandinavia.

On 27 February 2024, Baker was announced as the lead writer on Patience, an English-language adaptation of the French series Astrid and Raphaelle. The series had funding from PBS and Beta Film and stars Laura Fraser and Ella Maisy Purvis. On 6 February 2025, Baker's new crime series A Taste for Murder was announced, coming to Britbox.
