= A Taste for Murder =

British television series

- Genre: Crime drama; Detective fiction; Murder mystery
- Created by: Matt Baker
- Written by: Matt Baker
- Directed by: Jon Jones
- Starring: Warren Brown; Phyllis Logan; Beau Gadsdon; Cristiana Dell'Anna; Urbano Barberini; Alessandro Fella
- Country of origin: United Kingdom
- Original language: English
- No. of series: 1
- No. of episodes: 6

Production
- Executive producers: Jo McGrath; Walter Iuzzolino; Carolina Giammetta; Robert Schildhouse; Stephen Nye; Jess O' Riordan
- Producer: Megan Ott
- Production companies: Eagle Eye Drama; ITV Studios

Original release
- Network: ITVX; BritBox
- Release: 7 April 2026

A Taste for Murder is a British crime drama television series created by Matt Baker for ITVX and BritBox set in Italy. The series began streaming from 7 April 2026.

== Premise ==
A widowed metropolitan police detective takes his daughter to Capri for the summer to stay with his in-laws, and as they struggle to overcome their grief he gets immersed in helping solve local crime.

== Cast ==
- Warren Brown as DCI Joe Mottram
- Phyllis Logan as Elena Da Vinale
- Beau Gadsdon as Angelica
- Cristiana Dell'Anna as Police Inspector Lara Sarrancino
- Urbano Barberini as Gennaro Da Vinale
- Alessandro Fella as Luca
- Gaia Scodellaro as Daria
- Alessandro Bedetti as Daniele
- Giuseppe Bonifati as Andrea Carlotti
- Hattie Gotobed as Emily O'Brien

== Production ==
The show was created by Matt Baker. The six-part series is being co-produced by ITV Studios through Eagle Eye Drama and BritBox. The series is directed by Jon Jones and produced by Megan Ott. Jo McGrath, Walter Iuzzolino and Carolina Giammetta are executive producers for Eagle Eye Drama, with Robert Schildhouse, Stephen Nye and Jess O' Riordan as executive producers for BritBox.

The cast is led by Warren Brown, Phyllis Logan and Beau Gadsdon, and also includes Cristiana Dell'Anna, Urbano Barberini, Alessandro Fella, Gaia Scodellaro and Alessandro Bedetti.

Filming on the series took place on location in Italy and Croatia. Filming locations in Croatia included Opatija, Volosko and Labin in March 2025.

== Episodes ==
No.	Title	Directed by	Written by	Original release date	UK viewers (millions)
1	"Uova In Purgatorio (Eggs in Purgatory)"	Jon Jones	Matt Baker	7 April 2026	2.70
2	"Torta Della Nonna (Granny's Birthday Cake)"	Jon Jones	Matt Baker	7 April 2026	2.60
3	"La Colazione Perfetta! (The Best Breakfast Ever!)"	Jon Jones	Matt Baker	7 April 2026	2.16
4	"Arancini Croccanti (Crunchy Fried Risotto Balls)"	Jon Jones	Matt Baker	7 April 2026	2.11
5	"Ragù a Modo Tuo (Ragu Whichever Way You Like It)"	Jon Jones	Matt Baker	7 April 2026	2.34
6	"Holy Cannoli!"	Jon Jones	Matt Baker	7 April 2026	2.24

== Novel ==
A novel of the same name, also written by Baker, was released in January 2026.
