= Before We Die =

- Genre: Crime drama
- Created by: Matt Baker
- Based on: Innan vi dör by Niklas Rockström
- Written by: Matt Baker
- Directed by: Jan Matthys (series 1); Carolina Giammetta (series 2)
- Starring: Lesley Sharp
- Country of origin: United Kingdom
- Original language: English
- No. of series: 2
- No. of episodes: 11

Production
- Executive producers: Robert Franke; Walter Iuzzolino; Jo McGrath
- Producers: Robin Kerremans; Dimitri Verbeeck; Irma Inniss
- Production company: Eagle Eye Drama

Original release
- Network: Channel 4
- Release: 26 May 2021 – 25 June 2023

Before We Die is a British crime drama television series. Adapted by Matt Baker, it is based on the Swedish series of the same name (Innan vi dör), which was created by Niklas Rockström. Before We Die premiered on 20 March 2021 on Channel 4.

It was commissioned for a second series, which began airing on 25 June 2023.

== Premise ==
Veteran Detective Inspector Hannah Laing (Sharp) investigates the murder of her colleague and lover Sean, which leads to her being embroiled in a major plot by the powerful Mimicas crime family.

== Cast ==
- Lesley Sharp as DI Hannah Laing

== Episodes ==
=== Series 1 (2021) ===
No. overall	No. in series	Directed by	Written by	Original release date
1	1	Jan Matthys	Matt Baker	26 May 2021
2	2	Jan Matthys	Matt Baker	2 June 2021
3	3	Jan Matthys	Matt Baker	9 June 2021
4	4	Jan Matthys	Matt Baker	16 June 2021
5	5	Jan Matthys	Matt Baker	23 June 2021
6	6	Jan Matthys	Matt Baker	30 June 2021

=== Series 2 (2023) ===
No. overall	No. in series	Directed by	Written by	Original release date
7	1	Carolina Giammetta	Matt Baker and Mark Evans	25 June 2023
8	2	Carolina Giammetta	Matt Baker	25 June 2023
9	3	Carolina Giammetta	Matt Baker	25 June 2023
10	4	Carolina Giammetta	Matt Baker and Daniella DeVinter	25 June 2023
11	5	Carolina Giammetta	Matt Baker	25 June 2023

== Reception ==
Lucy Mangan of The Guardian awarded the first episode two stars out of five, criticizing the writing and declaring, "Despite all the brilliant work we have all seen Sharp, Regan and Ward do over the years, and perhaps because of the script, the acting is poor from the protagonists." Sean O'Grady from The Independent gave the first episode three out of five stars.
