= Reichenbach Falls (film) =

Reichenbach Falls is a 2007 British thriller television film directed by John McKay and starring Alec Newman, Alastair Mackenzie and Nina Sosanya. The script was adapted by James Mavor from a short story by Ian Rankin.

== Premise ==
In modern Edinburgh, DI Buchan investigates a hundred-year-old case.

== Cast ==
- Alec Newman ... Jim Buchan
- Alastair Mackenzie ... Jack Harvey
- Nina Sosanya ... Sinead Burns
- Laura Fraser ... Clara
- John Sessions ... Professor Bell
- Richard Wilson ... Arthur Conan Doyle
- The Monkey ... Himself
- Tom McGovern ... Gerry
- Greg Powrie ... Tour Guide
- David Robertson ... Newsreader
- Kirsty Wark ... Herself
- Cora Bisset ... Publicist

== See also ==
- Reichenbach Falls
