= Il a déjà tes yeux =

- Directed by: Lucien Jean-Baptiste
- Written by: Marie-Françoise Colombani; Lucien Jean-Baptiste; Sébastien Mounier
- Produced by: Maxime Delauney; Romain Rousseau; Serge de Poucques; Sylvain Goldberg; Adrian Politowski; Thierry Ardisson
- Starring: Lucien Jean-Baptiste; Aïssa Maïga; Zabou Breitman; Vincent Elbaz
- Edited by: Sahra Mekki
- Music by: Alexis Rault
- Production company: Nolita Cinema
- Distributed by: UGC Distribution
- Release dates: 27 August 2016 (Angoulême); 18 January 2017
- Running time: 95 minutes
- Countries: France; Belgium
- Language: French
- Budget: $6.6 million
- Box office: $9.8 million

Il a déjà tes yeux (English: He Even Has Your Eyes) is a 2016 Belgian-French comedy film directed by Lucien Jean-Baptiste.

== Plot ==
Paul and Sali are a married black couple who are unable to have biological children, and have been struggling to adopt a child for a long time. When Sali finally receives the call that their adoption file is approved and that a 4-month-old white baby boy called Benjamin is available, it seems like nothing could go wrong anymore. Except for the fact that Sali's parents do not accept their white grandchild, and that the social worker Claire Mallet will do anything at her reach to stop Paul and Sali from adopting Benjamin.

== Cast ==
- Lucien Jean-Baptiste as Paul Aloka
- Aïssa Maïga as Salimata Aloka
- Zabou Breitman as Claire Mallet
- Vincent Elbaz as Manu
- Michel Jonasz as Monsieur Vidal
- Naidra Ayadi as Anna
- Marie-Philomène Nga as Mamita
- Bass Dhem as Ousmane
- Delphine Théodore as Prune
- Sabine Pakora as Madame Diakité
- Marius Benchenafi as Benjamin (4 month)
- Mathéo Perard as Benjamin (1 year)
- Valérie Moreau as Madame Perez
- Grégoire Bonnet as Baptiste Mallet
- Guillaume Faure as matias
- Sara Mortensen as Kristina
- Maïmouna Gueye as Madame Diop
- Marie-Sohna Conde as Fatou
- Mariam Kaba as Madame Cissé
- Othniel Lefebvre as Gaspard

== Development ==
The movie was first introduced during the Angoulême Francophone Film Festival, in August 2016. The film was also screened at the 2016 Sarlat Film Festival.
