= Mama, There's a Man in Your Bed =

- Directed by: Coline Serreau
- Written by: Coline Serreau
- Produced by: Philippe Carcassonne; Jean-Louis Piel
- Starring: Daniel Auteuil; Firmine Richard
- Cinematography: Jean-Noël Ferragut
- Edited by: Catherine Renault
- Music by: Jérôme Reese
- Distributed by: UGC
- Release date: 22 March 1989 (France)
- Running time: 108 minutes (France); 111 minutes (USA)
- Country: France
- Language: French
- Box office: $6.4 million

Mama, There's a Man in Your Bed (French: Romuald et Juliette) is a 1989 light French comedy built around an interracial romance. Its French title is Romuald et Juliette (also the title of its British DVD release). The film was directed by Coline Serreau, of Three Men and a Cradle fame and stars Daniel Auteuil and Firmine Richard.

== Cast ==
- Daniel Auteuil - Romuald Blindet
- Firmine Richard - Juliette Bonaventure
- Pierre Vernier - Blache
- Maxime Leroux - Cloquet
- Giles Privat - Paulin
- Catherine Salviat - Francoise Blindet
- Muriel Combeau - Nicole
- Alexandre Basse - Benjamine
- Aissatou Bah - Félicité
- Mamadou Bah - Désiré
- Pascal N'Zonzi - Douta
- Marina M'Boa Ngong - Claire
- Sambou Tati - Aimé
- Alain Tretout - Vidal
- Fabienne Chaudat - Madame Salgado
- Emil Abossolo-Mbo - Husband 2
- José Garcia - Worker
- Carole Franck - The Receptionist
- Lionel Abelanski - The sick guy
- Guillaume de Tonquédec - Nicole's lover
- Nicholas Serreau - Fonctionnaire HLM
