= Catherine Tyldesley =

English actress

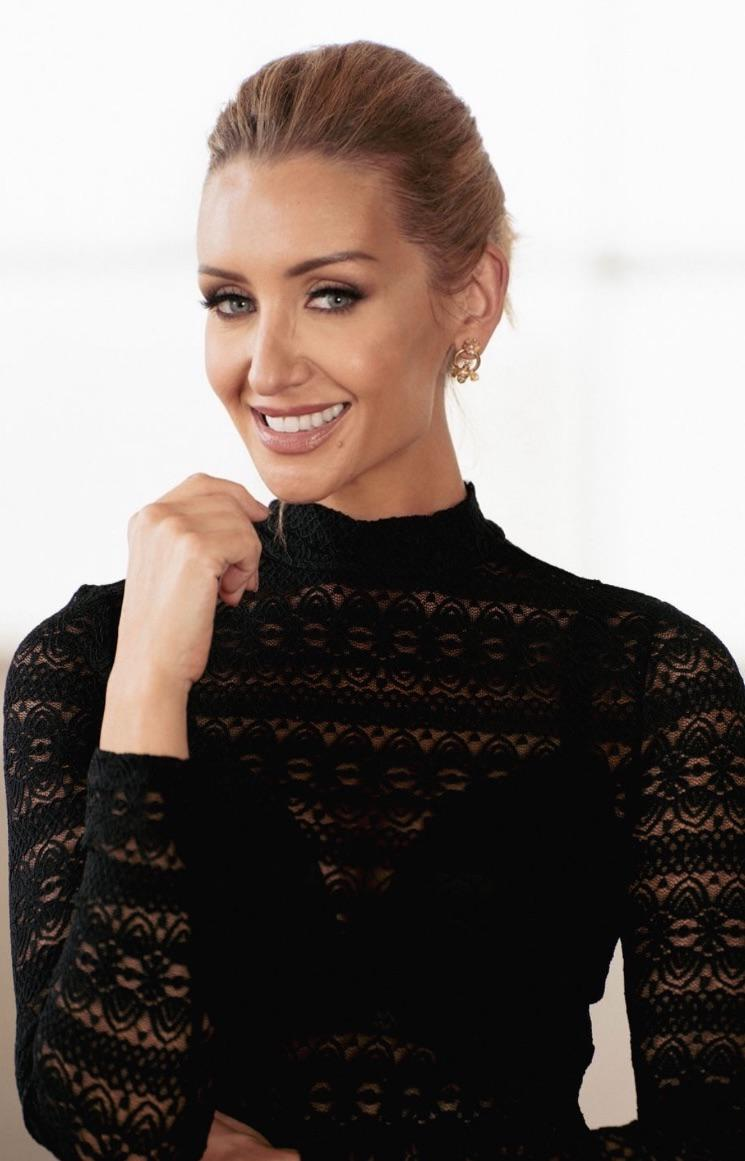
- Tyldesley in 2026
- Born: Catherine Mary Ann Tyldesley; 17 September 1983 (age 43); Walkden, Greater Manchester, England
- Education: St George's RC High School; Pendleton College
- Alma mater: Birmingham School of Acting
- Occupation: Actress
- Years active: 2005–present
- Known for: Coronation Street; Lilies
- Spouse: Tom Pitfield (m. 2016)
- Children: 2
- Relatives: Michael Vaughan (second cousin)
- Website: www.catherinetyldesley.co.uk

Catherine Mary Ann Tyldesley (born 17 September 1983) is an English actress, known for her roles as Iris Moss in the BBC drama Lilies (2007), Eva Price on the ITV soap opera Coronation Street (2011–2018, 2025–present) and Karen Norris in the BBC sitcom Scarborough (2019). She also appeared as a contestant on the seventeenth series of Strictly Come Dancing in 2019 and has appeared as First Officer Kate Woods in The Good Ship Murder since 2023.

== Early life ==
Catherine Mary Ann Tyldesley was born on 17 September 1983 in Walkden, Greater Manchester. She attended St. George's RC High School and Pendleton College before training at the Birmingham School of Acting (formerly the Birmingham School of Speech & Drama), graduating in 2005.

== Career ==
Tyldesley's television credits include Coronation Street, Holby City, Two Pints of Lager and a Packet of Crisps, Sorted, Florence Nightingale Red Riding, Shameless and Trollied. She played the lead role of Iris Moss in the Liverpool-set BBC drama Lilies in 2007. She also appeared in the comedy television pilot Guantanamo Phil, part of the Channel 4 Comedy Showcase 2009.

In 2010, Tyldesley played the role of Abi Peterson in Emmerdale for two months. Tyldesley sings in the range of mezzo-soprano. She has also modelled for the House of Fraser.

=== Coronation Street ===
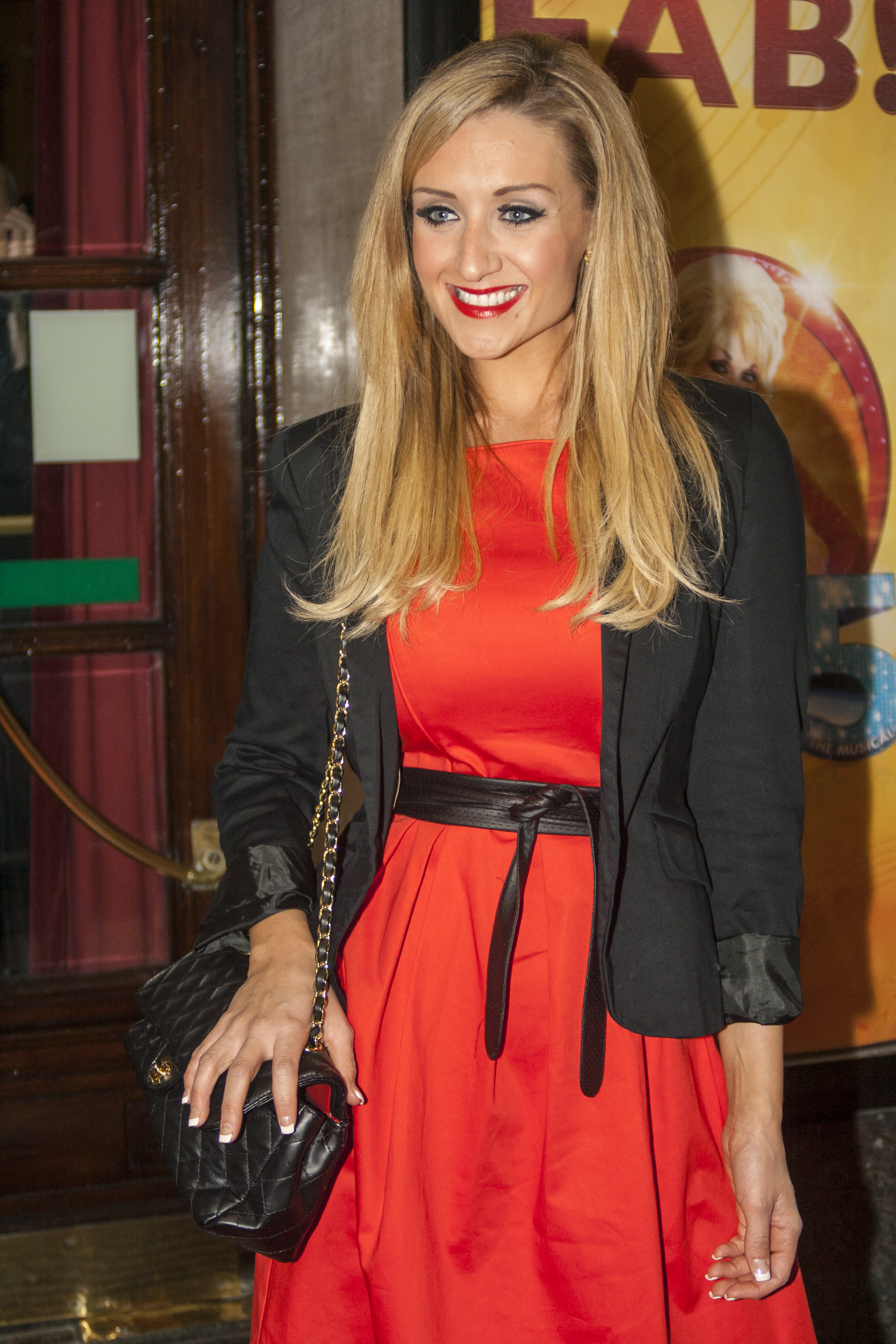
Tyldsley in 2012

Tyldesley played a midwife in an episode broadcast on 13 January 2006. In May 2011, Tyldesley was cast in the regular role of Eva. The actress began filming her first scenes that month. During an interview with Digital Spy, Tyldesley revealed that there had been a lot of competition for the role of Eva and that she felt "incredibly lucky" to have secured the part. Tyldesley said she felt "nervous" when she first arrived on set. Speaking to What's on TV, she said that she had a "mini freak out" when filming her first scenes in The Rovers. Tyldesley added that Coronation Street is "absolutely legendary" and is thrilled to be a part of the cast. After impressing producers, it was later confirmed that Tyldesley was to be kept on as a permanent member of the cast. After signing a new six-month contract, an executive said that Eva will be involved in some "cracking" storylines towards the end of the year.

In May 2012, Tyldesley expressed her desire for a long-term stint on the show. Speaking to the Daily Mirror, Tyldesley said "I've always wanted to be in Corrie. So when I got the phone call to tell me that I'd got the part, I was thrilled to bits." She also added that Eva has got "so much scope".

Before she appeared on screen, Eva was described as being "feisty". Tyldesley revealed more about her character, saying "Eva is a little bit of a princess! She's been spoiled rotten, so she's somewhat high maintenance and a little bit of a drama queen. She's definitely used to getting her own way." The actress said her character adores her mother and they share a great relationship. When Eva enters the show, her circumstances force her to be more angry than she normally is. Tyldesley said that Eva does have a softer side, which she believed viewers would see in the future. When asked why Eva and Karl do not get along, Tyldesley said "I think it's because they're both quite similar. When Eva first joins the street, she's had a little bit of turmoil with past relationships and things like that, so I think she feels like she wants to be quite selfish at the moment, which annoys Karl. But she's always been full of self-importance because she's always been spoiled – she's not known any different." Tyldesley revealed that Eva is not a lesbian character, despite a newspaper report, and that she definitely loves the boys. When asked about Eva's type, Tyldesley said that they would have to be "on her wavelength" as Eva gets bored and frustrated with people who are not on her level. In May 2012, Tyldesley commented that Eva's glamorous lifestyle can be "straining" and she enjoys time off work so she can wear normal and more comfortable clothes.

She wears the stuff I would never have the nerve to wear. It's weird, sometimes you just feel really glam and it's a nice feeling. Then other times you feel she's gone slightly overboard, ridiculous big hair and fake eyelashes – like TOWIE on Red Bull!

— Tyldesley explains Eva's sense of dress (2012)

In December 2017, it was announced that Tyldesley had decided to leave the series; her final scenes aired on 3 August 2018.

Tyldesley will reprise the role of Eva in 2025.

=== Other work ===
In 2016, she released her debut studio album, Rise.

In 2019, Tyldesley participated in the seventeenth series of Strictly Come Dancing and was partnered with Johannes Radebe. They were the fifth couple to eliminated. Also that year, she starred in the BBC comedy series Scarborough as Karen Norris.

In 2022, Tyldesley appeared in an episode of McDonald and Dodds as Kate Porter.

In 2023, she began appearing in The Good Ship Murder.

== Personal life ==
Tyldesley's second cousin is former England cricket captain Michael Vaughan.

In August 2014, Tyldesley announced she and her partner Tom Pitfield were expecting their first child. On 30 August 2014, Tyldesley announced via Twitter that she was engaged to Pitfield. She gave birth to son Alfie James on 18 March 2015. On 21 May 2016, Tyldesley married Pitfield. In October 2021, Tyldesley announced she and Pitfield were expecting their second child. She gave birth to her daughter, Iris Ella, on 19 April 2022.

=== Birthday cakes dispute ===
In August 2023, Tyldesley spoke out on Instagram about claims that she had, via a party planner, asked bakery owner Rebecca Severs of the Three Little Birds bakery in Keighley, West Yorkshire, to make two large cakes and 100 cupcakes for her 40th birthday party in exchange for publicity. Rebecca Severs had published her response to the party planner on Facebook, where she said: "Unfortunately, as my mortgage provider doesn't take payment in the form of 'promotion on their socials', and my staff can't feed their kids with 'exposure on Instagram', I'll have to decline your very generous offer."

Tyldesley said that she had no idea the emails were being sent and said that the Leeds-based event management agency and party planner NVRLND, who were involved, were "an amazing company", who had supplied her in the past with performers, and that they were "completely misrepresented in this matter". She added: "I hope the cake lady got the exposure she was craving" in a response that was widely criticised online.

== Filmography ==
=== Television ===
Year	Title	Role	Notes
2006	Holby City	Mackenzie James	Series 8; episode 12: "Mother Love"
2006	Coronation Street	Midwife 2	Episode 1.6203
2006	No Angels	Stephie	Series 3; episode 2
2006	Drop Dead Gorgeous	Rachel Worth	Series 1; episode 1
2006	Sorted	Female Viewer	Episode 2
2007	Lilies	Iris Moss	Main role; mini-series; episodes 1–8
2007	It's Adam and Shelley	Various	Episode 1
2007	The Street	Grace	Series 2; episode 4: "Taxi"
2008	Florence Nightingale	Parthenope	Television film
2008	Doctors	Lynne Hammerson	Series 10; episode 52: "Endless Love"
2008	The Jason Lewis Experience	Various	Television film
2009	Comedy Showcase	Louise	Series 2; episode 5: "Guantanamo Phil"
2009	Red Riding: 1983	Tessa	Television film
2010	Scallywagga	Psycho Sarah	Main role; episodes 1–6
2010	Holby City	Jody Stevens	Series 12; episode 47: "Transgressions"
2010–2011	Emmerdale	Abi Peterson	Recurring role; 20 episodes
2011	Shameless	Carly	Series 8; episode 5: "Wedding of Disaster"
2011	Two Pints of Lager and a Packet of Crisps	Amy	Series 9; episode 2: "Cheese Toastie"
2011	The Royal	Sheila Blunt	Series 8; episode 8: "Manoeuvres"
2011	Comedy Showcase	Mrs. Honeywell	Series 3; episode 1: "Chickens" (pilot for series)
2011–2012	Trollied	Emma	Recurring role; series 1 & 2; 8 episodes
2011–2018, 2025–	Coronation Street	Eva Price	Regular role; 880 episodes
2019	15 Days	Sara	Main role; episodes 1–4
2019	Scarborough	Karen Norris	Main role; episodes 1–6
2021	Handbags for Heroes	Herself	Episode 1 (alongside Stephanie Aird)
2021	Viewpoint	Kate Tuckman	Main role; mini-series; episodes 1–5
2021	The Holden Girls: Mandy & Myrtle	Herself	Episode 1
2022	McDonald & Dodds	Kate Porter	Series 3; episode 1: "Belvedere"
2023	Midsomer Murders	Kim Bailey	Series 24; episode 3: "Claws Out"
2023–	The Good Ship Murder	First Officer Kate Woods	Main role
2024	Protection	Helen McLennan	Mini-series; episode 1
2025	Brassic	Harper	Series 7; episode 3: "School Reunion"

=== Guest appearances ===
- Loose Women (2011) – Guest
- I'm a Celebrity...Get Me Out of Here Now! (2011) – Guest panellist
- Olly: Life on Murs (2012) – Herself
- Lorraine (2012) – Guest
- All Star Family Fortunes (17 February 2013 & 28 December 2013) – Contestant
- Through the Keyhole (21 September 2013 & 17 February 2018) – Guest panellist
- Tonight (2015–2017) – Herself
- Virtually Famous (2016) – Guest panellist
- Catch Phrase (2018) – Contestant
- Loose Women (2018) – Guest panellist
- Tipping Point: Lucky Stars (2019) – Contestant
- Strictly Come Dancing (2019) – Contestant; series 17
- The Crystal Maze (2019) – Adventurer
- Who Wants to Be a Millionaire? (2019) – Contestant
- The Weakest Link (2021-2023) – Contestant;
- Moneybags (2022) – Contestant; Celebrity Specials
- The One Show (2023) – Guest
- Richard Osman's House of Games (2024) – Contestant; 5 episodes

== Discography ==
=== Studio album ===
Title	Details
Rise	Released: 15 August 2016; Label: United Agents Records; Formats: CD, digital download

== Awards and nominations ==
Year	Award	Category	Work	Result	Ref.
2012	British Soap Awards	Sexiest Female	Coronation Street	Nominated	
2012	Inside Soap Awards	Sexiest Female	Coronation Street	Nominated	
2012	Inside Soap Awards	Best Dressed Soap Star	Coronation Street	Shortlisted	
2013	British Soap Awards	Sexiest Female	Coronation Street	Nominated	
2014	British Soap Awards	Sexiest Female	Coronation Street	Nominated	
2017	Inside Soap Awards	Best Actress	Coronation Street	Nominated	
2017	Inside Soap Awards	Best Bad Girl	Coronation Street	Nominated	
2017	Inside Soap Awards	Sexiest Female	Coronation Street	Shortlisted	
2018	TV Choice Awards	Best Soap Actress	Coronation Street	Nominated	
2018	British Soap Awards	Best Actress	Coronation Street	Shortlisted	
2018	Inside Soap Awards	Best Actress	Coronation Street	Shortlisted	
2018	Digital Spy Reader Awards	Best Soap Actor (Female)	Coronation Street	Sixth	
2025	TVTimes Awards	Best On-Screen Partnership (with Shayne Ward)	The Good Ship Murder	Nominated	
