= Florence Nightingale (2008 film) =

2008 BBC television drama

Florence Nightingale is a 60-minute 2008 BBC One television drama on the early years of Florence Nightingale, from 1837 to the Royal Commission into the Crimean War. Nightingale was played by Laura Fraser, and her father by Michael Pennington. It was first broadcast on Sunday 1 June 2008.

== Cast ==
- Laura Fraser as Florence Nightingale
- Michael Pennington as Wen, Florence's father
- Derek Hicks as Surviving Soldier
- Zoe Street Howe as Queen Victoria
- Andrew Harrison as Lord Palmerston
- Lorraine Cheshire as Watson, Nightingale maid
- Roy Hudd as Music Hall Barker
- Daryl Fishwick as Music Hall Florence
- Ben Stott as Music Hall Singer
- Sam Maurice, Paul Moorcroft, Richard Kelly, Harriet Web, and Kate Joseph as Music Hall Performers
- Robert Aram as Doctor
- Barbara Marten as Fanny, Florence's mother
- Catherine Tyldesley as Parthenope, Florence's elder sister
- Ian Bartholomew as Sidney Herbert
- Keith Clifford as the colonel
- Paul Opacic as Richard Monckton Milnes
- Chris Kerry, Cheryl Willday, Violet Foode, Wendy Patterson, and Debbie Rush as Nurse interviewees
- Olwen May as Mother Mary Clare
- John Axon as Orderly
- Jon Croft as Sir John Hall
- Tim Beasley as Fitzgerald
- Sam McKenzie as Dr Farr
- Dougie Chapman as Music Hall Colonel

== Crew ==
- Writer and director - Norman Stone
- Producer - Roger Childs
- Consulting Producer - Kenneth Cavander
- Director of Photography - Michael Fox
- Editor - Colin Goudie
- Music - Jeremy Soule

== Filming locations ==
- Lea hurst, Derbyshire
- Butterley Station, Ripley
- St John the Baptist Church, Tideswell
- Manchester Town Hall
- Croxteth Hall, St George's Hall, High Park Reservoir - Liverpool

== Reception ==
John Lloyd of the Financial Times found that the most emotionally powerful segment of the show was the scene where her father told her "God is in charge, not you" when she agonised over her shortcomings in Crimea. He called it "moving and powerful". Lloyd thought that the show's remainder was "uneven but in a good way". In a negative review, The Daily Telegraph's Stephen Pile wrote that the programme "was flagged up as a big revisionist drama showing the real Flo, but there was little in this entire 60 minutes that was not described with infinitely more wit, style and detail by Lytton Strachey in Eminent Victorians as long ago as 1918". Aidan Smith of The Scotsman said Laura Fraser, who played Nightingale, "deliver[ed] her lines with gusto". The Times's journalist Stuart Wavell called the programme "remarkable not only for its poignancy but also for the new light it sheds on a national icon".

In a negative review, The Independent columnist Tom Sutcliffe wrote that it "a bit more lively than the usual church pamphlet" and "it fell down in not drawing a sharp-enough distinction between the music-hall simplifications of its song-and-dance numbers and the notionally more realistic scenes of the drama". David Belcher of The Herald penned a positive review, stating, "Writer-director Norman Stone certainly had his work cut out in crafting an arresting modern-day depiction of the nursing heroine of the Crimean war. That he largely succeeded was owing to his diligence in trawling Nightingale's own writings."
