= St George's Roman Catholic High School =

Location
- Parsonage Drive; Walkden, Greater Manchester, M28 3SH; England
- Coordinates: 53°31′16″N 2°24′25″W

Information
- Type: Voluntary Aided School
- Religious affiliation: Roman Catholic
- Established: 1962
- Closed: 2014
- Local authority: Salford City Council
- Department for Education URN: 105985 Tables
- Head teacher: P. J. Harte.
- Gender: Mixed
- Age: 11 to 16

St George's Roman Catholic High School, was a Voluntary Aided school in Walkden, Greater Manchester, England. Established in the late 1960s, it was operated by the Governing Body and the Diocese of Salford, with funding and services provided by Salford City Council.

== History ==
The school had previously faced closure in May 2009 after Salford City Council had voted to shut the school down as part of its £182m plan to build three new schools in the city. The decision was overturned after the school and its pupils protested the decision.

The school eventually closed in August 2014. The majority of students transferred to nearby St Ambrose Barlow Roman Catholic High School where the building was enlarged to accommodate additional students from St George's Roman Catholic High School. The final headteacher upon the closure of St George's Roman Catholic High School was Mr P. J. Harte.

Since 2017, the former school has been used as the film set for CBBC’s children's drama 4 O'Clock Club.

In 2019 the government announced plans to open an academy on the site of the former high school. The proposal is being challenged by Salford City Council.

== Notable former pupils ==
- Gemma Merna, actress and glamour model
- Jamie Moore, former British light-middleweight boxing champion
- Catherine Tyldesley, actress
- Mark Barry, member of BBMAK
