= Dieumerci! =

- Directed by: Lucien Jean-Baptiste
- Written by: Véronique Armenakian; Nathalie Bialobos; Grégory Boutboul; Jean-Claude Flamand-Barny; Zoé Galeron; Lucien Jean-Baptiste; David Vital-Durand
- Produced by: Aïssa Djabri; Farid Lahouassa
- Starring: Lucien Jean-Baptiste; Baptiste Lecaplain
- Cinematography: Colin Wandersman
- Edited by: Sahra Mekki
- Music by: Fred Pallem
- Production company: Vertigo Productions
- Distributed by: Wild Bunch Distribution
- Release dates: 14 January 2016 (Festival International du Film de l'Alpe d'Huez); 16 March 2016
- Running time: 95 minutes
- Country: France
- Language: French
- Budget: $4 million
- Box office: $672.000

Dieumerci! is a 2016 French comedy directed by Lucien Jean-Baptiste.

== Cast ==
- Lucien Jean-Baptiste as Dieumerci
- Baptiste Lecaplain as Clément
- Delphine Théodore as Brigitte
- Olivier Sitruk as Marc
- Firmine Richard as Marie-Thérèse
- Michel Jonasz as Daniel
- Jean-François Balmer as Ventura
- Edouard Montoute as The Chief
- Jacques Frantz as Polito
- Noémie Merlant as Audrey
- Sabine Pakora as The Prostitute
- Alexis Tomassian as Red Cap Prisoner
