= Gemma Merna =

English actress and model (born 1984)

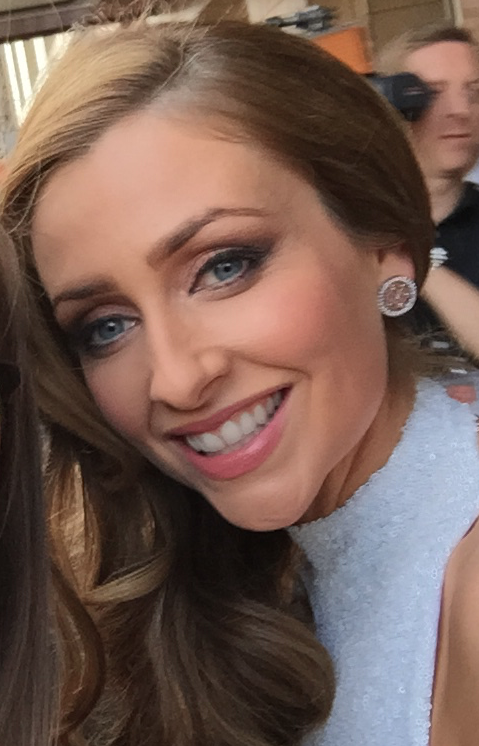
- Merna in 2015
- Born: 6 February 1984 (age 42); Manchester, England
- Education: St George's RC High School
- Occupations: Actress; model
- Years active: 2006–2017; 2022–present
- Known for: Role of Carmel McQueen in Hollyoaks
- Television: Hollyoaks (2006–2014); Splash! (2014)
- Spouse: Ian Minton (m. 2012)
- Awards: British Soap Award for Best Comedy Performance

Gemma Merna (born 6 February 1984) is an English actress and model. She is best known for portraying Carmel McQueen in the Channel 4 soap opera, Hollyoaks from 2006 to 2014.

== Career ==
Merna joined the cast of the Channel 4 soap opera Hollyoaks in August 2006. In 2007, she won Best Comedy Performance in 2007 at the British Soap Awards. In 2008, Merna appeared on the game show All Star Family Fortunes in a Hollyoaks v Emmerdale special. In February 2013, she appeared on All Star Family Fortunes playing against gardener, garden designer and television personality Diarmuid Gavin.

In 2009, Merna appeared in the spin-off show Hollyoaks Later as Carmel. She also appeared in an episode of the game show Hole in the Wall.

In 2011, she appeared in the documentaries 50 Greatest Wedding Shockers and Hollyoaks Best Bits.

In 2013 and 2014, Merna was a panelist in an episode of Big Brother's Bit on the Side.

In January 2014, she was a contestant on the ITV diving show Splash!, fronted by Tom Daley, she was the first contestant to be eliminated from the show in Heat One.

On 24 August 2014, it was announced that Merna had decided to leave Hollyoaks and would leave in November 2014 in one of Hollyoaks' biggest stunts. Jennifer Metcalfe, who plays Merna's on-screen sister Mercedes McQueen, announced her decision to leave the soap opera a few days after Merna's announcement. The character was killed off in an explosive train accident on 12 November 2014, with cast members and television critics praising Merna's performance in her final scenes.

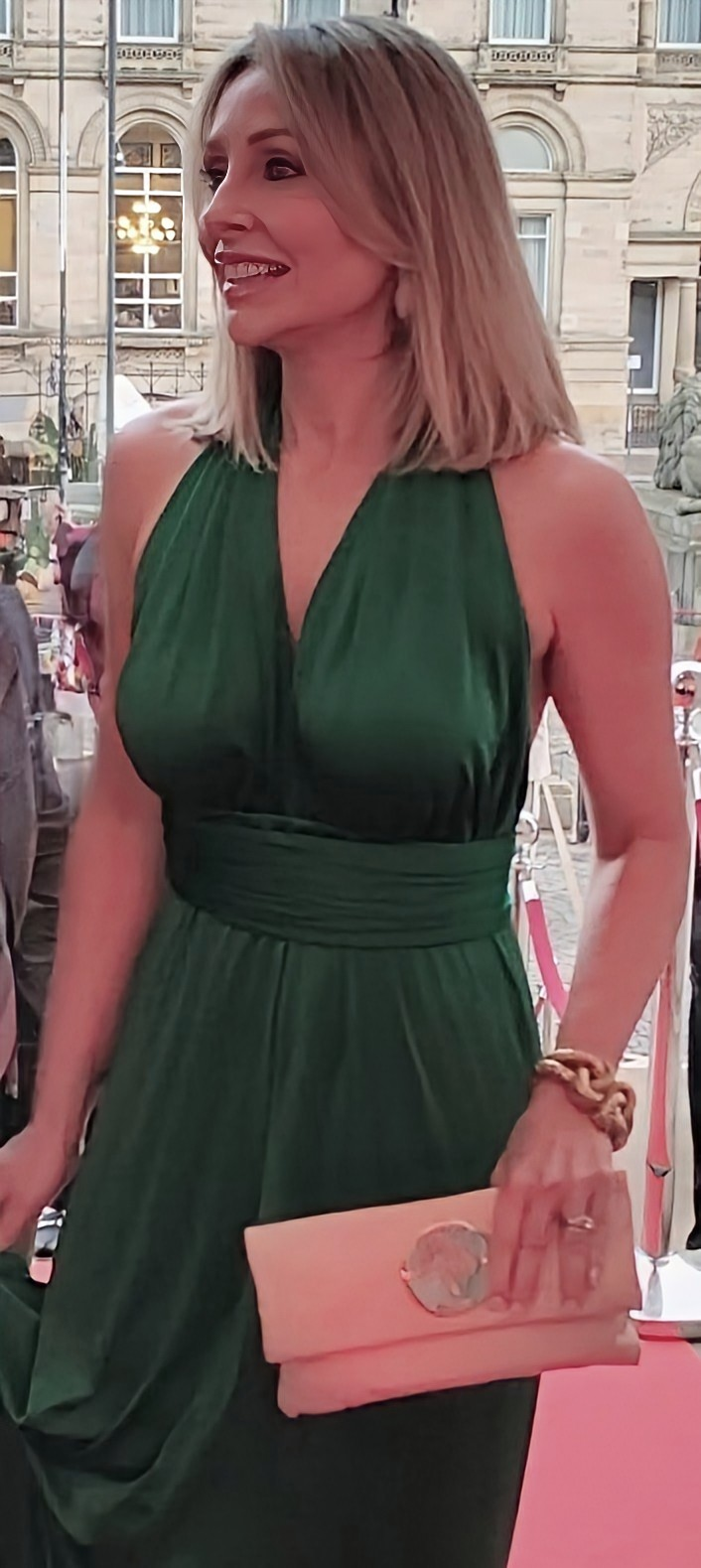
Merna arriving at the Hollyoaks 30th Anniversary Party in 2025

On 8 September 2014, Merna appeared on the panel show Virtually Famous, presented by Glee actor Kevin McHale.

On 25 October 2014, Merna appeared on a special celebrity episode of The Chase.

In 2017, Merna appeared in an episode in TV show Doctors. She also joined former TV mum Nicole Barber-Lane as teammates on the 28 October 2017 "Soaps" episode of Pointless Celebrities.

In January 2022 Merna announced on an Instagram post that she is returning to filming.

As of April 2024, Merna has joined the cast of Coronation Street as 'Rebecca' and hopes to have an extended stay.

== Personal life ==
Merna was born in Manchester and grew up in Worsley where she attended St. George's RC High School, Walkden.

She was engaged to long-term boyfriend Ian Minton and they married in 2012.

In a 2009 interview with Closer magazine, Merna said that having a breast enlargement at the age of 21 was one of the best things she ever did and that it gave her so much confidence.

== Filmography ==
Year	Title	Type	Role	Notes
2006–2014, 2026	Hollyoaks	TV	Carmel Valentine	Regular role, 567 episodes
2009–2010	Hollyoaks Later	TV	Carmel Valentine	5 episodes
2009	Hole in the Wall	TV	Herself	1 Episode
2011	50 Greatest Wedding Shockers	TV	Herself	TV documentary
2011	Hollyoaks Best Bits 2011	TV	Herself	TV documentary
2008, 2013	All Star Family Fortunes	TV	Herself	2 episodes
2013, 2014	Big Brother's Bit On The Side	TV	Herself	2 episodes, guest
2014	Splash!	TV	Herself	Heat 1, contestant
2014	Virtually Famous	TV	Herself	1 episode, panelist
2014	The Chase Celebrity Special	TV	Herself	1 episode, participant
2014	Daily Brunch with Ocado	TV	Herself	1 episode, guest
2024	Coronation Street	TV	Rebecca	Guest role

== Awards and nominations ==
Year	Award	Category	Result	Ref.
2007	The British Soap Awards	Sexiest Female	Nominated	
2007	The British Soap Awards	Best Comedy Performance	Won	
2007	Inside Soap Awards	Best Newcomer	Nominated	
2007	Inside Soap Awards	Funniest Performance	Nominated	
2007	13th National Television Awards	Most Popular Newcomer	Nominated	
2007	Hollyoaks End-of-year Awards	Favourite Female Character	Won	
2007	Hollyoaks End-of-year Awards	Funniest Character	Won	
2008	The British Soap Awards	Best Actress	Nominated	
2008	Inside Soap Awards	Best Couple (with Ricky Whittle)	Nominated	
2008	Inside Soap Awards	Funniest Performance	Nominated	
2008	TV Now Awards	Favourite Soap Couple (with Whittle)	Nominated	
2010	The British Soap Awards	Sexiest Female	Nominated	
2010	Inside Soap Awards	Best Actress	Nominated	
2010	Inside Soap Awards	Best Wedding (with Whittle)	Nominated	
2011	Hollyoaks Best Bits Awards	Best Kiss	Won	
2012	Inside Soap Awards	Funniest Female	Nominated	
2013	Inside Soap Awards	Funniest Female	Nominated	
2014	The British Soap Awards	Sexiest Female	Nominated	
2014	Inside Soap Awards	Funniest Female	Nominated	
2015	20th National Television Awards	Serial Drama Performance	Nominated	
2015	All About Soap Awards	Best Soap Moment of 2014	Nominated	
