= One 4 All =

- Directed by: Claude Lelouch
- Screenplay by: Claude Lelouch; Pierre Leroux; Pierre Uytterhoeven
- Produced by: Claude Lelouch; Tania Zazulinsky; Jean-Paul De Vidas
- Starring: Jean-Pierre Marielle; Anne Parillaud; Alessandra Martines; Marianne Denicourt; Alice Evans; Olivia Bonamy; Samy Naceri
- Cinematography: Eric Peckre; Philippe Vene
- Edited by: Hélène de Luze; Stéphane Mazalaigue
- Music by: Francis Lai
- Production companies: Canal+ France 2 Cinéma; Les Films 13
- Distributed by: BAC Films
- Release date: 29 December 1999
- Running time: 120 minutes
- Country: France
- Language: French
- Budget: $11.2 million
- Box office: $2.6 million

One 4 All (original title: Une pour toutes) is a French romantic comedy film directed by Claude Lelouch, released in 1999.

== Synopsis ==
Three actresses decide to use their talents to seduce rich men. However, their 'perfect plan' succumbs to the hazards of life.

== Starring ==
- Jean-Pierre Marielle : Commissaire Bayard
- Anne Parillaud : Olga Duclos
- Alessandra Martines : Maxime
- Marianne Denicourt : Irina Colbert
- Alice Evans : Macha Desachy
- Olivia Bonamy : Olivia Colbert
- Samy Naceri : Sam Morvan
- Geneviève Fontanel : Lola
- Bruno Lochet : The plumber
- Lise Lamétrie : Minouche
- Firmine Richard : The handmaid of the president
- Claude Lelouch : Himself
- Albert Delpy : The colleague
- Jean-Marie Winling : The banker
- Constantin Alexandrov : The King of the Night
- Andréa Ferréol : The Queen of the Night
- Pascale Arbillot : The businesswoman
- François Berléand : Unpleasant passenger
- François Perrot : The producer
- Rüdiger Vogler : The conductor
- Anouk Aimée : His wife
- Maka Kotto : Omar, the dictator
- Michel Jonasz : The friendly passenger
