= Patience (TV series) =

British television series

- Genre: Crime drama Mystery
- Created by: Matt Baker
- Based on: Astrid et Raphaëlle by Alexandre de Seguins and Laurent Burtin
- Written by: Matt Baker; Stephen Brady (Series 1); Amy Shindler; Beth Chalmers (Series 2)
- Directed by: Maarten Moerkerke
- Starring: Ella Maisy Purvis; Laura Fraser; Jessica Hynes
- Music by: Hannes De Maeyer; Ruben De Gheselle
- Countries of origin: United Kingdom; Belgium
- Original language: English
- No. of series: 2
- No. of episodes: 14

Production
- Executive producers: Jo McGrath; Walter Iuzzolino; Dries Vos
- Producer: Alison Kee
- Cinematography: Konrad Widelski
- Editor: Lieven Billiet
- Camera setup: Arri Alexa Mini LF
- Running time: 47 minutes
- Production companies: Eagle Eye Drama; Happy Duck Films; Beta Film

Original release
- Network: PBS; Channel 4
- Release: 8 January 2025 – present

Patience is a British–Belgian detective drama television series starring Ella Maisy Purvis as autistic police archivist Patience Evans, with Laura Fraser (series 1) and Jessica Hynes (series 2) as police detective inspectors. The series is set in York, England, and is adapted from the Franco-Belgian television series Astrid et Raphaëlle (a.k.a Bright Minds).

The series premiered in the United Kingdom on Channel 4 on 8 January 2025. A second series, with eight episodes, premiered on 7 January 2026. A third series is in production.

== Premise ==
A detective inspector (DI) forms an alliance with a brilliant, self-taught, autistic archivist who has been working in the criminal records department of the City of York police.

== Cast ==
=== Main ===
- Ella Maisy Purvis as Patience Evans
  - Ava-Grace Cook as 11-year-old Patience
  - Oona Van Harneveldt as 6-year-old Patience
- Laura Fraser as DI Bea Metcalf (series 1)
- Jessica Hynes as DI Frankie Monroe (series 2)
- Tom Lewis as Elliot Scott
- Nathan Welsh as DS Jake Hunter
- Mark Benton as DCI Calvin Baxter
- Ali Ariaie as DC Will Akbari
- Adrian Rawlins as Douglas Gilmour

=== Recurring ===
- Liza Sadovy as Dr Loretta Parsons
- Jamie Maclachlan as George Evans
- Lotte Lauren as Mathilde Evans
- Connor Curren as Billy Thompson
- Maxwell Whitelock as Alfie Metcalf-Haynes
- Eddie Elks as David Haynes
- Hannah Tointon as Joy

== Production ==
The series is an adaptation of the Franco-Belgian series Astrid and Raphaelle and was announced in February 2024 by Eagle Eye Drama, PBS Distribution and Beta Film, in association with Belgium's Happy Duck Films and with support from the Belgian Tax Shelter. Jo McGrath and Walter Iuzzolino were executive producers for Eagle Eye and Maarten Moerkerke was to direct. The writing team was led by Matt Baker and included Stephen Brady, Sarah Freethy, and Daniella DeVinter.

Location filming for series one took place in York from 23 to 29 April 2024 at Precentor's Court, opposite York Minster, Monkgate, The Shambles, Gillygate and Micklegate. However, other than these exterior sequences which place the stories in York, most of the show was filmed in Belgium.

Patience was renewed for a second series, with a new writing team led by Amy Shindler and Beth Chalmers. Filming took place in Belgium and York in May 2025, with Jessica Hynes added to the cast as a new DI replacing Laura Fraser's character as Fraser was unavailable. A third series was commissioned with filming continuing in York and Belgium in 2026.

== Episodes ==
=== Overview ===
Series	Episodes	Originally released	
Series	Episodes	First released	Last released
1	6	8 January 2025	8 January 2025
2	8	7 January 2026	7 January 2026

=== Series 1 (2025) ===
No. overall	No. in series	Title	Directed by	Written by	Original release date	UK viewers (millions)
1	1	"Paper Mountain Girl: Part 1"	Maarten Moerkerke	Matt Baker	8 January 2025	3.37
2	2	"Paper Mountain Girl: Part 2"	Maarten Moerkerke	Matt Baker	8 January 2025	3.11
3	3	"The Missing Link"	Maarten Moerkerke	Stephen Brady and Matt Baker	8 January 2025	3.49
4	4	"The Locked Room"	Maarten Moerkerke	Stephen Brady and Matt Baker	8 January 2025	3.21
5	5	"My Brother's Keeper"	Maarten Moerkerke	Stephen Brady and Matt Baker	8 January 2025	3.47
6	6	"Pandora's Box"	Maarten Moerkerke	Daniella DeVinter and Matt Baker	8 January 2025	3.18
The team is called in after a worker at a meat-processing firm dies while on a bus. Dr Parsons initially suspects tuberculosis, but Patience recognises symptoms of anthrax infection, which is confirmed by tests. The victim is revealed to be a member of an eco-terrorist group targeting meat-processing firms. The team suspects that the group sought to infect the plant where he worked to sow distrust in the meat industry, but counterterrorism takes over the operation and freezes out Bea. Bea continues to investigate, particularly after links to a prior arson attack committed by the same group are found. At the same time, she begins suffering the effects of anthrax infection. Bea is suspended for interfering with counterterrorism, but Patience and Jake persist, with Dr Parsons's reluctant assistance. The two eventually determine that the victim was a former undercover police officer who turned rogue and helped commit the arson. The lead counterterrorism agent is revealed to be his wife, who used a sample of anthrax from prior evidence collected to infect the victim because he had a child with another member of the terrorist group.

=== Series 2 (2026) ===
No. overall	No. in series	Title	Directed by	Written by	Original release date	UK viewers (millions)
7	1	"Vampire"	Maarten Moerkerke	Amy Shindler and Beth Chalmers	7 January 2026	<2.87
8	2	"Music in the Minster"	Maarten Moerkerke	Amy Shindler and Beth Chalmers	7 January 2026	<2.87
9	3	"The Magpie"	Maarten Moerkerke	Amy Shindler and Beth Chalmers	7 January 2026	2.88
10	4	"The Timetable"	Maarten Moerkerke	Amy Shindler and Beth Chalmers	7 January 2026	2.76
11	5	"The Runes"	Maarten Moerkerke	Rachel Smith	7 January 2026	3.03
12	6	"Paco's Revenge"	Raf Reyntjens	Jacqui Honess-Martin	7 January 2026	2.96
13	7	"A Monk's Tale"	Raf Reyntjens	Amy Shindler and Beth Chalmers	7 January 2026	3.16
14	8	"Hostage"	Raf Reyntjens	Amy Shindler and Beth Chalmers	7 January 2026	2.94

== Broadcast ==
The first episode was broadcast at 9:00 pm on 8 January 2025, in the United Kingdom on Channel 4. All episodes were immediately made available on Channel 4's digital streaming platform. The second series, consisting of eight episodes, premiered on 7 January 2026.

== Reception ==
=== Critical response ===
On the review aggregator website Rotten Tomatoes, 85% of 13 critics' reviews are positive, with an average rating of 5.9/10. The website's consensus reads: "Distinguished by Ella Maisy Purvis' terrific performance, Patience brings a fresh angle to the detective genre through character rather than plotting." Metacritic, which uses a weighted average, assigned the film a score of 66 out of 100, based on 12 critics, indicating "generally favorable" reviews.

Critics' reviews of series one were mixed. In a three-star review for The Telegraph, Chris Bennion summarised it as "a worthwhile addition to the crime drama ranks, but one that fits into, rather than breaking the mould." In a two-star review for The Guardian, Lucy Mangan described the plot as "preposterous", the dialogue as "terrible", and the drama overall as "deeply uninspired" and "embarrassingly clunky". Carol Midgely in The Times said that Purvis does not "overact" the character's condition, "showing it in overt and subtle ways".
