= Husky Kihal =

French actor (1961–2026)

- Kihal in 2024
- Born: 31 December 1961; Lyon, France
- Died: 3 September 2026 (aged 64)
- Occupation: Actor

Husky Kihal (31 December 1961 – 3 September 2026) was a French actor. He appeared in over 150 films and television programs between 1997 and 2026, and was best known for playing Henry Fournier, a forensic pathologist in the Franco-Belgian detective television series Astrid et Raphaëlle.

Kihal died on 3 September 2026, at the age of 64.
