= The Alan Clark Diaries =

- Genre: Drama
- Written by: Jon Jones
- Directed by: Jon Jones
- Starring: John Hurt; Jenny Agutter; Hugh Fraser; Nicholas Jones; Jeremy Clyde; Paul Brooke
- Country of origin: United Kingdom
- Original language: English
- No. of series: 1
- No. of episodes: 6

Production
- Producers: Richard Fell; Phillippa Giles; Laura Mackie
- Cinematography: Ian Moss
- Editor: Sue Wyatt
- Running time: 30 minutes

Original release
- Network: BBC Four
- Release: 15 January – 19 February 2004

The Alan Clark Diaries is a 2004 BBC television serial dramatising the diaries of the controversial British Conservative politician Alan Clark. The six-episode series debuted on BBC Four on 15 January 2004, and was later repeated on BBC Two.

== Episodes ==
=== March of the Grey Men ===
In the run up to the 1983 general election Clark dreams of escaping the backbenches and becoming a minister. Clark is returned as MP for Plymouth Sutton and subsequently appointed Parliamentary Undersecretary of State for Employment by Prime Minister Margaret Thatcher but finds his secretary disdainful and his briefs turgid and devious. Furthermore, Sir Robert Armstrong, head of the civil service, warns Clark about his personal conduct. Clark attends a wine tasting prior to reading his first bill at the House of Commons and is called up on a Point of Order by opposition MP Clare Short for being incapable. The sudden arrival of Leader of the House John Biffen is a clear indication to Clark that he is to be dismissed at the first opportunity.

=== The Lady ===
Ian Gow offers Clark a way to escape the department he has grown to loathe and make his way to the centre of power. Clark submits suggestions for the reform of the Prime Minister's office and enlists Jonathan Aitken in his plot but fails to get the appointment to head it. Clark makes his first appearance on BBC Question Time hosted by Sue Lawley where he criticises the decision of Defence Secretary Michael Heseltine to purchase a missile system from the US. Clark leaves the 1984 Brighton conference early narrowly avoiding the Provisional Irish Republican Army hotel bombing but is overlooked in the resulting reshuffle. Racist comments from Clark about Britain's black community result in a press outrage. The resignations over the Westland affair result in Clark's appointment as Minister for Trade.

=== Foreign Parts ===
Clark takes up his new position as Minister for Trade where he dreams of a position in the cabinet as he sets out on an arduous tour of European states plagued by reports that he is anti-European. Returning home Clark feels worn down by his constant travels and his relationship with Jane is under strain. Re-elected in the 1987 general election but overlooked for cabinet once again Clark holds on determined to get through his anti-fur legislation but following his return from a controversial trip to Chile the Prime Minister under pressure from Canada forces him to drop the legislation. A reshuffle gives Clark his long dreamed of position at the Ministry of Defence but it is under new Defence Secretary Tom King a man he considers ghastly.

=== Defence of the Realm ===
Clark has finally made it into the coveted Ministry of Defence but his triumph is short-lived when he finds himself once again walking on thin ice with his old rival Tom King. All the while, the political temperature is rising — poll tax riots rage, the Gulf War breaks out, and The Lady's iron grip on the Tory party appears to be slipping fast.

=== Into the Wilderness ===
With Thatcher gone and his estate in terminal decline Clark remains in curiously high spirits. In the resulting leadership election Clark supports the ultimately successful John Major but still finds himself out of favour as he criticises Britain's NATO allies in the run up to the Gulf War and a younger generation of ministers rises up. An affair puts Clark under personal as well as professional pressure and in the mistaken belief that the Conservatives would lose the 1992 general election he announces his decision not to stand for re-election. Clark is thrust once again into the headlines as he finds himself in court over the Matrix Churchill scandal. Abandoned and alone in retirement at Saltwood Castle Clark regrets his decision to leave politics.

=== Leaving Home ===
Rotting away in retirement Clark dreams of a victorious return to the House of Commons. When Chelsea MP Sir Nicholas Scott finds himself embroiled in scandal Clark starts pushing for the seat. Despite attempts to make Clark the scapegoat for the Arms-to-Iraq scandal the Scott Inquiry clears him. Initially rejected by Chelsea further scandals for Scott result in Clark's eventual selection for the newly merged seat of Kensington and Chelsea. The 1997 general election sees Clark's victorious return to the House of Commons but the Conservatives devastatingly defeated by New Labour. Diagnosed with brain cancer, Clark chooses to disappear from public life.

== Filming locations ==
Saltwood Castle featured as itself during the series after Clark's widow, Jane, gave her support for the production and welcomed the team into her home. The castle remains owned by the Clark family, and is rarely opened to the public. Alan Clark often used to visit Hythe seafront and this is represented in the first episode of the series.
