= Beau Gadsdon =

British television and film actress

- Born: 17 January 2007 (age 19)
- Citizenship: United Kingdom
- Occupation: Actress
- Years active: 2016–present

Beau Gadsdon (born 17 January 2007) is a British television and film actress.

== Career ==
As a child actress, she appeared in Rogue One: A Star Wars Story as a young Jyn Erso. She played mini-Harry in the 2017 music video for Harry Styles song Kiwi. She played a young Lisbeth Salander in the 2018 film The Girl in the Spider's Web.

She played Polly Ingram, the daughter of Matthew Macfadyen's Major Charles Ingram in true-life television crime drama Quiz in 2020. She also appeared in the horror film Censor, playing the younger version of Enid, played by Niamh Algar. She appeared in Katherine Ryan comedy series The Duchess for Netflix, and the comedy series The Baby.

In 2021, she played a young Antonia Minor on historical television series Domina. In 2022, she could be seen in Netflix spy thriller Treason. That year, she had the lead role of Lily Watts in The Railway Children Return, a film which also starred Jenny Agutter, and was a sequel to the 1970 film The Railway Children.

In 2023, Gadsdon appeared in series six of The Crown in flashback scenes set on Victory in Europe Day playing a teenage Princess Margaret alongside Viola Prettejohn as the teenage Princess Elizabeth. She had first played the role in series one in 2016.

In 2024, she appeared in the television adaptation of A Gentleman in Moscow starring Ewan McGregor.

== Personal life ==
She has two younger sisters, one older brother, and two older half-sisters. Her younger sisters, Dolly Gadsdon and Billie Gadsdon have followed her into the world of acting.

== Filmography ==
=== Film ===
Year	Title	Role	Notes
2016	Rogue One	Young Jyn Erso	
2017	Salt	Micah	Short film
2018	The Girl in the Spider's Web	Young Lisbeth Salander	
2021	Censor	Young Enid	
2022	The Railway Children Return	Lily Watts	Lead role
2023	The Critic	Freya	
2024	Here	Young Elizabeth (12–15 years)	
2025	The Conjuring: Last Rites	Dawn Smurl	
2026	The Nomophobe	Madison Ashley-Cooper	Short film. Post-production
TBA	The Scurry	Jordan	Completed
TBA	The Night House	Karen	Post-production

=== Television ===
Year	Title	Role	Notes
2016–2023	The Crown	Young Princess Margaret	Recurring role; 5 episodes
2018	Genius	Young Francoise	Episode: "Picasso: Chapter Five"
2020	Quiz	Polly Portia Ingram	Mini-series; 2 episodes
2020	The Duchess	Millie	3 episodes
2021	Domina	Young Antonia Minor	4 episodes
2021	The Baby	Sally	2 episodes: "The Mother" and "The Rage"
2022	Treason	Ella Lawrence	Mini-series; 5 episodes
2024	A Gentleman in Moscow	Sofia (Adult)	Mini-series; 3 episodes
2024	Ellis	Amy Mercer	Episode: "Hanmore"
2025–2026	A Taste for Murder	Angelica Mottram	6 episodes
