= Stephanie Aird =

English comedian

- Born: 4 October 1968 (age 58); London, England
- Children: 2
- Presenting career
- Style: Comedian, singer and songwriter
- Country: United Kingdom

Stephanie Aird (born 4 October 1968) is an English comedian, singer, songwriter and television personality from Hartlepool, England.

== Career ==
Aird has amassed over 820,000 social media followers and posts videos to her Facebook and TikTok pages about her daily life. Her videos have received over 100 million views. She also runs a cafe-bar based in Church Street, Hartlepool, where she regularly performs. She has had over 100 compositions played on BBC Radio Tees' BBC Music Introducing.

In 2017, Aird appeared on ITV's Judge Rinder with Robert Rinder.

In 2018, Aird performed 'an evening with' comedy show alongside The Royle Family actor and comedian Ricky Tomlinson in Liverpool.

In 2021, she was a series regular on BBC Two's walking programme Take A Hike. She also had her own solo episode which aired the same week.

In 2023, Aird appeared in a BBC documentary about Lyne Barlow called The Sunshine Scammer. Aird has also appeared in Handbags For Heroes with Catherine Tyldesley and as an extra in Vera.

Aird often tours across the United Kingdom with her comedy shows.

She runs her own pottery and jewellery company called Phannie Potter. 'Phannie' is taken from her first name and the word 'fan', in relation to her fan base.

On 4 August 2024, in an interview with Kelly Scott on BBC Radio Newcastle, Aird spoke with "John", a publicist for Hardwick Festival. In the brief phone call "John" asked Aird if she would like to perform at the 2024 Hardwick Festival, to which Aird, in tears, agreed. On 14 August 2024, Aird then posted the interview to her social media pages announcing that she would be performing at Hardwick Festival as part of the Acoustic Acts on Friday, 16 August 2024.

== Filmography ==
=== Television ===
Year	Programme	Role	Notes
2017	Judge Rinder	Herself	One episode / ITV
2018	Extra Extra	Pam	Series
2018	BBC Look North	Herself	Guest
2021	Take A Hike	Herself	Series and solo episode
2021	Handbags For Heroes	Herself	Alongside Catherine Tyldesley
2023	The Sunshine Scammer	Cameo role	BBC IPlayer
2023	Vera	Extra	BBC

== Theatre ==
Aird is a regular at the adult and children Christmas pantomimes at Hartlepool Town Hall. She previously toured with Britain's Got Talent finalist Danny Posthill at Newcastle Upon Tyne's Tyne Theatre and Opera House.
