= Ella Maisy Purvis =

English actress (born 2003)

- Born: 2 June 2003 (age 23); London, England
- Education: London Academy of Music and Dramatic Art (FdA)
- Occupation: Actress
- Years active: 2022–present

Ella Maisy Purvis (born 2 June 2003) is an English actress. On television, she is known for her role in the CBBC series A Kind of Spark (2023–2024) and as the title character in the Channel 4 series Patience (2025–).

== Early life and education ==
Purvis was born in South London to an urban planner mother and a business coach father.

She trained as a classical ballet dancer before pursuing acting as a career. She studied acting at London Academy of Music and Dramatic Art graduating with a foundation diploma in 2023.

Purvis was diagnosed with autism at the age of 17 and has said the diagnosis helped her; with it, life became "a lot easier to navigate because you don’t blame yourself."

== Career ==
Purvis had television roles in Heartstopper and in A Kind of Spark. In 2024, she was nominated for The Breakthrough Award by the Northern Ireland branch of the Royal Television Society for her work on A Kind of Spark.

She appeared in her first lead role in the Channel 4 crime drama Patience in 2025. She played a crime-solving neurodivergent police archivist named Patience Evans, working with detective Bea Metcalfe (Laura Fraser). Carol Midgely in The Times said that Purvis does not "overact" the character's condition, "showing it in overt and subtle ways." Purvis herself is autistic and has ADHD, which she was quoted as saying could "bring a level of authenticity to the narrative that would otherwise be lacking, which just makes for a more engaging and meaningful story." The series was renewed for a second season.

Purvis was among the cast of episode 4, series 1, of the 2025 reboot of crime drama Bergerac.

== Filmography ==
Key
†	Denotes works that have not yet been released

Year	Title	Role	Notes
2022	Heartstopper	Girl 1	Series 1; episode 4: "Secret"
2023	Malpractice	Josephine Paige	Series 1; episode 2
2023	Blueprint	Cass	Short film
2023–2024	A Kind of Spark	Elinor Fraser / Bonnie Bridges	Series 1 & 2; 19 episodes
2025-present	Patience	Patience Evans	Lead role; 14 episodes
2025	Bergerac	Sophie Armstrong	Series 1; episode 4
2026	Finding Emily	Meg	Supporting role; uncredited
