= Richard Gotainer =

French singer, actor and publicist (born 1948)

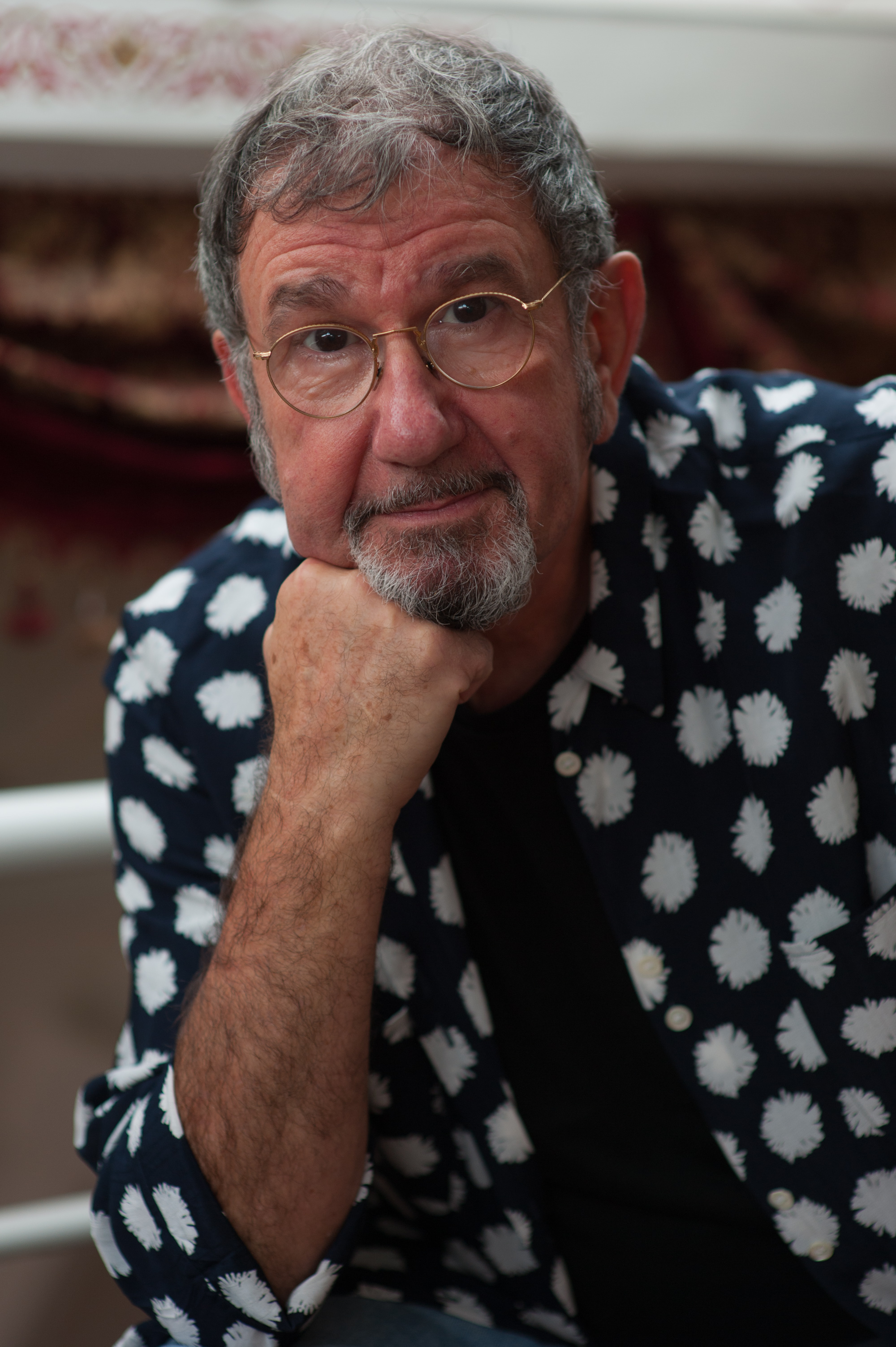
Gotainer in 2016

Richard Gotainer (born 30 March 1948) is a French singer, actor, and publicist. He writes most of the lyrics to his songs, often to music by Claude Engel.

== Early life ==
Gotainer was a Boy Scout. He met and befriended the animator Jacky. He is of Polish Jewish descent.

== Career ==
Gotainer began his professional life in 1972 at the Walter-Thompson advertising agency, from which he was fired the following year for "bad spirits". In 1974, he and Jacques Gaudillat founded the advertising agency Gatkess, specializing in radio spots and soundtracks for television.

Over the years, he created advertising hits that became famous, including M-V (M, m, m comme maroquinier; V, v, v comme voyage, the collective of leather makers), Vittel (Buvez, éliminez), Infinitif (Primitif), Banga (Y'a des fruits, y'a de l'eau), Belle des champs (Tu baguenaudes dans les pâturages…), Choco BN (Il est 4 heures…), Saupiquet (Cassoulet, Couscous, Paella) ou Danette (On se lève tous pour Danette !). From 1982 to 1985, at the Gray agency, he provided the voiceover and the music for the advertising cartoons for Malabar chewing gum. It was during the recording of the advertisement for Banga that he met Claude Engel, a renowned musician. Gotainer offered to work with him, doing so first in television ads and then for songs.

=== Advertisements ===
He began his professional life in 1972 in the Walter-Thompson advertising agency, from which he was dismissed the following year for "bad spirit". In 1974, he created with Jacques Gaudillat the advertising agency Gatkess ·, specialized in radio spots and soundtracks for television.

After his live album Comme à la maison (2010), the singer announced in 2017 that he was preparing a new studio album as well as a book on his radio columns. The album Saperlipopette released in June 2018.

== Variety songs ==
More than his advertisements, it was his variety songs that made him known to the general French public, from 1980 onwards. Throughout the 1980s, his dancing electronic hits, with wacky and facetious arrangements on double with a high sound rhythm and playing on alliteration, were massively broadcast on French radios.

Primitif, Poil au tableau, Le Sampa (from the film Le Maître d'école, sold 500,000 singles), La Ballade de l'obsédé, Le Mambo du décalco, Femmes à lunettes, Chipie, and Le Youki are some of his most famous songs.

Richard Gotainer also gives 250 performances of his musical show co-written with Éric Kristy, La Goutte au pépère (music by Étienne Perruchon ), including one at the Olympia.

When he ceased his collaboration with Claude Engel, his official composer, he then worked with Michaël Lapie for an album with rock and electro atmospheres. On the other hand, Celmar Engel, brother of Claude, works alongside him as a sound engineer and musician.

After his album Comme à la maison (2010), the singer-songwriter announced in 2017 that he was preparing a new album, as well as a work on his radio columns. The album Saperlipopette is released in June 2018.

On March 19, 2018, the National Union of Authors and Composers awarded Richard Gotainer a Grand Prize in tribute to his career.

To receive this prize, he had the idea of reciting one of his texts rather than singing. This service is at the origin of the approach that he has undertaken since September 2022 by presenting on stage Gotainer brings back his phrase, his songs played, interpreted like an actor. He is accompanied by his guitarist accomplice Brice Delage, whose sound interventions illustrate and add noise to the storyteller's words.

== Local political engagement ==
In 2020, he ran in the municipal elections of the small town of Cérilly ( Allier ), in 13th position on the list of the outgoing mayor ( DVD ), Olivier Filliat. However, it was the list of Fabien Thevenoux supported by the PCF which won the vote and he was not elected.

== Personal life ==
Richard Gotainer has two sons, Léo (1991) and Tom (1996), with Isabelle de Araujo, artistic director and professional makeup artist, who was later the companion of actor Christian Clavier.
