= Blood Strangers =

2002 British television crime drama

- Genre: Crime drama
- Written by: Gwyneth Hughes
- Directed by: Jon Jones
- Starring: Caroline Quentin; Paul McGann; Siobhan Finneran; Sheridan Smith; David Crellin; Ray Panthaki; Daine McCormick; Rita May
- Composer: Dario Marianelli
- Country of origin: United Kingdom
- Original language: English
- No. of series: 1
- No. of episodes: 2

Production
- Executive producer: Hugh Warren
- Producers: Saurabh Kakkar; Anne Pivcevic
- Cinematography: Ian Liggett
- Editor: Nick Arthurs
- Running time: 90 minutes
- Production company: Granada Television

Original release
- Network: ITV
- Release: 3 February – 4 February 2002

Blood Strangers is a two-part British television crime drama, written by Gwyneth Hughes and directed by Jon Jones, that broadcast across two consecutive nights between 3 and 4 February 2002 on ITV. The series was commissioned in January 2001, as one of two new projects to star Caroline Quentin, with the other, Hot Money, broadcasting in December 2001. Nick Elliott, then controller of drama at ITV, described Quentin as being "...very good at playing very ordinary women." The series was described by ITV as "an emotionally charged two-part thriller that looks at the devastating effect of teenage prostitution on two respectable British families." Paul McGann, Sheridan Smith, David Crellin and Ray Panthaki are also credited as principal members of the cast.

More than nine million viewers tuned in for both episodes. The Guardian described the series' success as "ITV's respite from the ratings doldrums." The series was nominated for a PRIX Italia television award in 2002. Quentin commented of her role as Lin Beresford; "It's a strange feeling when you wake up and know you're going to spend the whole day grieving. Every morning I'd be thinking, `Oh no, I have to grieve all over again'. But I was determined to do it and all the tears you see are real. They're all mine. I've got quite a good emotional imagination, but having a daughter of my own made it easier to tap into that sorrow. All I had to do was imagine that the child lying dead on the hospital bed was my own and you're away. I can't imagine anything more awful than losing a child, I really can't."

== Cast ==
- Caroline Quentin as Lin Beresford
- Paul McGann as DC David Ingram
- Siobhan Finneran as WPC Melanie Whitaker
- Sheridan Smith as Jas Dyson
- David Crellin as Nick Beresford
- Ray Panthaki as Zafar Wahid
- Daine McCormick as Ant Beresford
- Rita May as Pat Beresford
- Lucy Hodgkinson as Emma Beresford
- Samantha Jayatilaka as Kalsoom Ikram
- Suraj Dass as Shakil Ikram
- Dennis Conlon as Sohel Ikram
- Shireen Shah as Jamila Ikram
- Parvez Qadir as Manzar Wadid
- Miriam Ali as Maahin Wahid
- Andrew Readman as DCS Alastair Fleming
- Martin Walsh as DC Paul Mayhew
- Steve Evets as Benny Nightingale
- Stacey Hamlin as Lauren Nightingale
- Caroline O'Neill as Jenna Albury
- Lynda Steadman as Stacey Ingram
- Naomi Bridges as Jessica Ingram
- Samantha Jones as Anne-Marie Bennett
- Angela Forrest as Margery Hopper
- Amanda Tyrell as PC Bernadette Gilligan
- Ced Beaumont as Donald Murphy

== Episodes ==
No.	Title	Directed by	Written by	Original release date	Viewers (millions)
1	"Episode 1"	Jon Jones	Gwyneth Hughes	3 February 2002	9.43
When teenager Emma Beresford (Lucy Hodgkinson) is found badly beaten on a town common, her mother Lin (Caroline Quentin) is left distraught as her beloved daughter dies shortly after arriving in hospital. Seeking the truth, Lin meets DC David Ingram (Paul McGann) and WPC Melanie Whitaker (Siobhan Finneran), two officers assigned as her family liaison team. Under pressure from both his family and the constraints of his role as a Detective Constable, Paul attempts to help Lin in her search for answers surrounding Emma's untimely death. The subsequent investigation leads the police to discover that Emma had been working as a prostitute, and that her boyfriend Manny Wadid (Parvez Qadir)'s brother, Zafar (Ray Panthaki), was acting as her pimp. Zafar appears to have a cast-iron alibi for the night Emma died, having been arrested for being drunk and disorderly and spending the night in a police cell in Manchester. However, the police subsequently learn that Zafar does not drink alcohol, and it is revealed that he had given his driver's licence to a 16-year-old friend.
2	"Episode 2"	Jon Jones	Gwyneth Hughes	4 February 2002	9.68
Zafar is arrested on suspicion of murder, while Lin continues to undertake her own enquiries into Emma's death. She tracks down another prostitute, Jas Dyson (Sheridan Smith), who was also pimped by Zafar and believes that he loves her, even though he is violent toward her. Lin tries to help Jas, but she insists on going back to Zafar. Lin forms an emotional attachment to Paul, prompting Nick to believe that they are having an inappropriate relationship, while his superior officer warns that he will be suspended if he continues to see her. The police are eventually forced to release Zafar for lack of evidence, but Lin eventually finds out the truth about what happened to Emma when Jas reveals the truth about the night of her death.
