= Laura Fraser =

Scottish actress (born 1975)

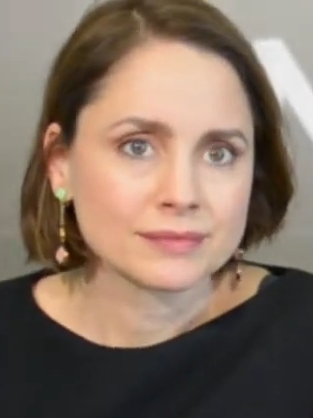
- Fraser in 2017
- Born: 24 July 1975 (age 51); Glasgow, Scotland
- Education: Royal Conservatoire of Scotland
- Occupation: Actress
- Years active: 1995–present
- Spouse: Karl Geary (m. 2003)
- Children: 1

Laura Fraser (born 24 July 1975) is a Scottish actress. She has played Door in the urban fantasy series Neverwhere (1996), Kate in the film A Knight's Tale (2001), Cat MacKenzie in the BBC Three drama series Lip Service (2010–2012), Lydia Rodarte-Quayle in the AMC crime drama series Breaking Bad (2012–2013) and its spin-off Better Call Saul (2017–2020), and Professor Sarah Gordon in the BBC One crime series Traces (2019–2022).

== Early life and education ==
Laura Fraser was born on 24 July 1975 in Glasgow, Scotland. She attended Hillhead High School and is a former member of the Scottish Youth Theatre. She trained at the Royal Scottish Academy of Music and Drama (now the Royal Conservatoire of Scotland).

== Career ==
Fraser's first big break was playing Door in the BBC's dark fantasy series Neverwhere in 1996. She starred in the BBC film The Tribe (1998), and played Lavinia in Titus (1999) as well as Justine in Virtual Sexuality (1999) and Candice in Kevin & Perry Go Large (2000). She also appeared in the films A Knight's Tale (2001) and Vanilla Sky (2001). She starred in the BBC period drama serials He Knew He Was Right (2004), Casanova (2005), and Reichenbach Falls (2007). She starred in the British comedy film Nina's Heavenly Delights (2006). She played Claire Bellington in the ITV series Talk to Me (2007).

Fraser starred as the title character in Florence Nightingale, broadcast on BBC One in June 2008. From 2010 to 2012, she starred as Cat in the BBC Three series Lip Service. In 2010, it was announced that she would portray Jessica Brody in the pilot for the Showtime political thriller series Homeland. She was replaced on the show by Morena Baccarin. From 2012 to 2013, she portrayed Lydia Rodarte-Quayle in the final season of the AMC crime drama series Breaking Bad. From 2017 to 2020, she made occasional appearances as the same character in the prequel Better Call Saul, but was unable to appear during the final season due to COVID-19 restrictions preventing travel between the United States and Scotland, where she lived when the season began filming.

She played Eve Stone in the 2016 television series The Missing. She played DI Juliet Wallace in the 2016 BBC miniseries One of Us. In 2017, Fraser starred as DS Annie Redford in the six-part ITV drama The Loch. In January 2020, she appeared as Kane in the Doctor Who episode "Orphan 55".

In 2025 Fraser starred in the ITV series Patience as lead detective Bea Metcalf, who builds a working relationship with a neurodivergent person, named Patience, from the criminal records team.

In April 2026, Fraser starred as Cat in the BBC One darkly comic crime drama series Mint, written and directed by Charlotte Regan. The eight-part series explores the inner life and conflicts of a prominent Scottish crime family, focusing on her character's fractured relationship with her husband Dylan, played by Sam Riley..

In October 2026, it was announced that Fraser had been cast as Angela, the long-suffering mother of the protagonist, in the BBC drama series The Young Team, scheduled to be broadcast in 2027. Directed by Paul McGuigan and produced by Synchronicity Films, the six-part drama is an adaptation of Graeme Armstrong's award-winning debut novel of the same name, which explores themes of territorial gang violence and identity in North Lanarkshire. Fraser stars in the production alongside Kevin McKidd, who portrays an inspirational headteacher.

== Personal life ==
She married Irish-born American actor Karl Geary in 2003. They have one daughter and live in Glasgow, Scotland. Fraser does not drink alcohol.

== Filmography ==
=== Film ===
Year	Title	Role	Notes
1995	Good Day for the Bad Guys	Red Riding Hood	Short film
1996	Small Faces	Joanne Macgowan	
1997	Paris, Brixton	Amanda	Short film
1998	Left Luggage	Chaya Silberschmidt	
1998	The Man in the Iron Mask	Bedroom Beauty	
1998	Cousin Bette	Mariette	
1998	Divorcing Jack	Margaret	
1999	Virtual Sexuality	Justine Alice Parker	
1999	The Match	Rosemary Bailey	AKA The Beautiful Game
1999	Whatever Happened to Harold Smith?	Joanna Robinson	
1999	Titus	Lavinia	
2000	Kevin & Perry Go Large	Candice	
2001	A Knight's Tale	Kate	
2001	Vanilla Sky	The Future	
2003	Den of Lions	Katya Paskevic	
2003	Devil's Gate	Rachael	
2003	16 Years of Alcohol	Helen	
2003	Coney Island Baby	Bridget	
2003	The Old One	Jane Doe	Short film
2006	Nina's Heavenly Delights	Lisa MacKinlay	
2006	Land of the Blind	Madeleine	
2006	The Flying Scotsman	Anna Obree	
2009	Voices	Judy	Short film
2009	Cuckoo	Polly	
2009	The Boys Are Back	Katy	
2010	You Were Perfectly Fine	Girl 1	Short film
2011	Flutter	Helen	
2013	Wish You Well	Amanda Cardinal	
2014	The Sisterhood of Night	Rose Hall	
2016	I Am Not a Serial Killer	April Cleaver	
2017	Man with Van	Talia	
2018	In the Cloud	Mary	
2019	Beats	Alison	
2019	Tales from the Lodge	Martha	
2019	Dark Encounter	Olivia Anderson	
2020	Snow Globe: A Breaking Bad Short	Lydia Rodarte-Quayle (voice)	Short film

=== Television ===
Year	Title	Role	Notes
1996	Taggart	Michelle	2 episodes: "Devil's Advocate": Parts 1 & 3
1996	Casualty	Gemma McEnery	Episode: "For Your Own Good"
1996	Neverwhere	Door	Mini-series; 6 episodes
1997	The Investigator	Louise Marshall	Television film
1997	Summer of Love	Isabel	Television film
1998	The Tribe	Megan	Television film
1999	A Christmas Carol	Belle	Television film
2000	Forgive and Forget	Hannah	Television film
2001	Station Jim	Harriet Collins	Television film
2004	Conviction	Lucy Romanis	Mini-series; 6 episodes
2004	He Knew He Was Right	Emily Trevelyan	Mini-series; 4 episodes
2004	Iron Jawed Angels	Doris Stevens	Television film
2005	Casanova	Henriette	Mini-series; 3 episodes
2007	Talk to Me	Claire	4 episodes
2007	Reichenbach Falls	Clara	Television film
2008	Florence Nightingale	Florence Nightingale	Television film
2008	The Passion	Abigail	Mini-series
2009	No Holds Bard	Sarah Rutherford	Television film
2010	Single Father	Rita Morris	Mini-series; 4 episodes
2010–2012	Lip Service	Cat MacKenzie	8 episodes
2012–2013	Breaking Bad	Lydia Rodarte-Quayle	12 episodes
2014	Black Box	Regan Black	13 episodes
2014	Forever	Patricia Abbott	Episode: "The Man in the Killer Suit"
2014	Castles in the Sky	Margaret	Television film
2015	Cocked	Hannah	Television film
2015	Peter & Wendy	Mrs. Darling / Julie Rose	Television film
2015	Law & Order: Special Victims Unit	Professor Jessica Dillon	Episode: "Devastating Story"
2015	The Magicians	Female Professor	Episode: "Unauthorized Magic"
2016	Houdini and Doyle	Lydia Belworth	Mini-series; episode: "A Dish of Adharma"
2016	One of Us	Juliet	Mini-series; 4 episodes (Released on Netflix as Retribution)
2016	The Missing	Eve Stone	8 episodes
2017	The Loch	DS Annie Redford	Mini-series; 6 episodes
2017–2020	Better Call Saul	Lydia Rodarte-Quayle	4 episodes
2019–2022	Traces	Prof. Sarah Gordon	12 episodes
2020	Doctor Who	Kane	Series 12; episode: "Orphan 55"
2021	The Pact	Anna	6 episodes
2021–2022	Crime	Sally Hart	9 episodes
2025	Patience	DI Bea Metcalf	Lead role; 6 episodes
2026	Mint	Cat	8 episodes
2027	The Young Team	Angela	6 episodes

== Awards and nominations ==
Year	Award	Category	Nominated work	Result	Ref.
2006	BAFTA Scotland Awards	Best Actress in a Scottish Film	The Flying Scotsman	Nominated	
2013	Screen Actors Guild Awards	Outstanding Performance by an Ensemble in a Drama Series	Breaking Bad	Nominated	
2014	Screen Actors Guild Awards	Outstanding Performance by an Ensemble in a Drama Series	Breaking Bad	Won	
2017	BAFTA Scotland Awards	Best Actress – Television	The Missing	Won	
