= Lucien Jean-Baptiste =

French actor and film director

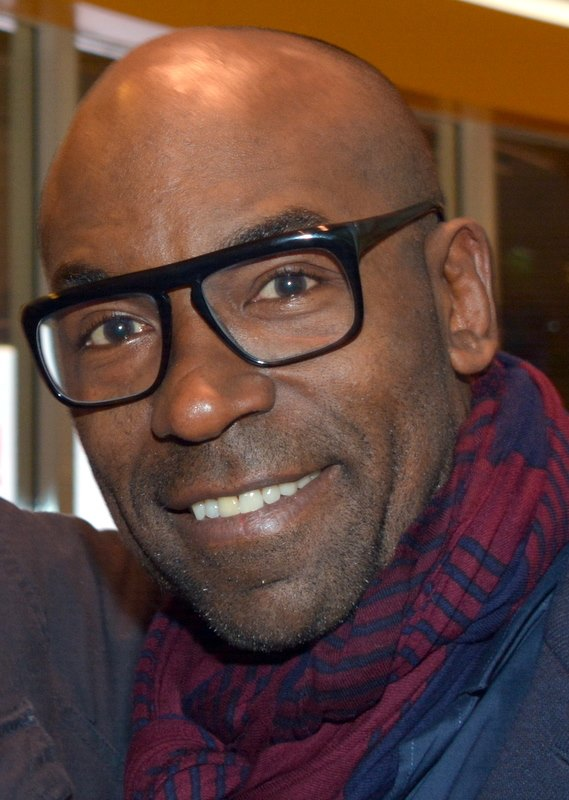
- Lucien Jean-Baptiste in March 2016
- Born: 6 May 1964 (age 62); Fort-de-France, Martinique
- Occupations: Actor, writer, director
- Years active: 1997–present

Lucien Jean-Baptiste (born 6 May 1964) is a French actor, writer and director.

== Life and career ==
He is the French voice in films starring Chris Rock, Don Cheadle, Martin Lawrence and Ice Cube. His voice is also heard in movies with Terrence Howard, Will Smith, Kevin Hart, Jamie Foxx and Anthony Mackie.

== Theater ==
Year	Title	Author	Director
1997	Le Cid	Pierre Corneille	Thomas Le Douarec
1998	Dom Juan	Molière	Jean-Luc Jeener
2001	Au bal d'Obaldia	René de Obaldia	Stéphanie Tesson
2004	The Cherry Orchard	Anton Chekhov	Jean-René Lemoine

== Filmography ==
=== Actor ===
Year	Title	Role	Director	Notes
1998	Sous le soleil	Bob Robin	Eric Summer	TV Series (1 Episode)
1999	Du bleu jusqu'en Amérique	Bob	Sarah Lévy	
1999	Cruel été	The marabout	Nicolas Goetschel	Short
1999	Véga	Kabala	Laurent Heynemann	TV Movie
2000	Antilles sur Seine	France Télécom	Pascal Légitimus	
2000	Je suis un super héros	Julien	Eric Guirado	Short
2001	De l'amour	Supermarket watchman	Jean-François Richet	
2001	C'est la vie	The ambulance	Jean-Pierre Améris	
2001	Jeu de cons	Cop 2	Jean-Michel Verner	
2001	Il est difficile de tuer quelqu'un, même un lundi	The seller	Eric Valette	Short
2001	Caméra Café	Franck Marchand	Yvan Le Bolloc'h, Bruno Solo, ...	TV Series (6 Episodes)
2002	The Code	Foued	Manuel Boursinhac	
2003	Quand tu descendras du ciel	Emile	Eric Guirado	
2003	L'outremangeur	The legist	Thierry Binisti	
2003	The Man Without a Head	The third head	Juan Solanas	Short
2003	Simon le juste	Zac	Gérard Mordillat	TV Movie
2003	Le roman de Georgette	Philippe	Alain Robillard	TV Movie
2003	L'île atlantique	The doctor	Gérard Mordillat	TV Movie
2003	Les Cordier, juge et flic	Joseph	Gilles Béhat	TV Series (1 Episode)
2004	Mon fils cet inconnu	The educator	Caroline Huppert	TV Movie
2004	Un petit garçon silencieux	The doctor	Sarah Lévy	TV Movie
2004	Sœur Thérèse.com	Moussa	Williams Crépin & Joyce Buñuel	TV Series (2 Episodes)
2005	The Ex-Wife of My Life	The inspector	Josiane Balasko	
2005	Emmenez-moi	Arsène	Edmond Bensimon	
2005	La Noiraude	M. Grand-Grec	Fabienne & Véronique Kanor	Short
2005	Le triporteur de Belleville	Senegalese sergeant	Stéphane Kurc	TV Movie
2005	Quai n° 1	Degas	Alain Robillard	TV Series (1 Episode)
2005	Fabien Cosma	Antoine Euphrasie	Marion Sarraut	TV Series (1 Episode)
2005	Le juge est une femme	Lieutenant Pichavant	Christian Bonnet	TV Series (1 Episode)
2006	On va s'aimer	Julien	Ivan Calbérac	
2006	Les irréductibles	The physics teacher	Renaud Bertrand	
2006	L'État de Grace	Fred Brago	Pascal Chaumeil	TV Mini-Series
2007	13 m²	Farouk	Barthélémy Grossmann	
2007	The Murder of Princess Diana	Martin	John Strickland	TV Movie
2007	Les jurés	Patrick	Bertrand Arthuys	TV Mini-Series
2007-2008	Banja	Banja	Eric Berthier	TV Series (27 Episodes)
2008	Répercussions	Inspector Valréas	Caroline Huppert	TV Movie
2008	Sauvons les apparences!	Malik	Nicole Borgeat	TV Movie
2009	Beyond the Ocean	Tetanos	Éliane de Latour	
2009	La première étoile	Jean-Gabriel Élisabeth	Lucien Jean-Baptiste	
2009	Aliker	Bissol	Guy Deslauriers	
2009	Rencontre avec un tueur	Lieutenant de Mauny	Claude-Michel Rome	TV Movie
2009	Villa Belle France	Tony	Karim Akadiri Soumaïla	TV Movie
2010	Henry	Gabriel	Kafka & Pascal Rémy	
2011	The Prey	Alex	Eric Valette	
2012	Possessions	Patrick Castang	Eric Guirado	
2012	30° couleur	Patrick Rima	Lucien Jean-Baptiste & Philippe Larue	
2012	Ma première fois	The doctor	Marie-Castille Mention-Schaar	
2013	Je fais le mort	Lieutenant Lamy	Jean-Paul Salomé	
2013	Fonzy	Quentin	Isabelle Doval	
2013	Turf	Fortuné	Fabien Onteniente	
2013	La vraie vie des profs	The director	Emmanuel Klotz & Albert Pereira-Lazaro	
2014	X-odus	Commodore	François Languille & Romain Rogier	TV Mini-Series
2014	Scènes de ménages	Serge	Francis Duquet	TV Series (1 Episode)
2015	108 Demon Kings	Tourbillon-Noir	Pascal Morelli	
2016	We Are Family	Hugo	Gabriel Julien-Laferrière	
2016	Dieumerci !	Dieumerci	Lucien Jean-Baptiste	
2016	Le gang des Antillais	Patrick Chamoiseau	Jean-Claude Flamand-Barny	
2016–present	Munch	Hubert Bellanger	Nicolas Guicheteau, Frédéric Berthe, ...	TV Series (18 Episodes)
2017	Il a déjà tes yeux	Paul Aloka	Lucien Jean-Baptiste	
2017	La deuxième étoile	Jean-Gabriel Élisabeth	Lucien Jean-Baptiste	
2018	Christ(Off)	Father Marc	Pierre Dudan	
2018	Abdel et la comtesse	Priest Yasokonoue	Isabelle Doval	
2019	Junk Love	Head of Service	Pierre de Suzzoni	
2019	Turbulences	The Hunter	Daniel Kamwa	Post-Production
2019	Adorables	Victor	Solange Cicurel	Post-Production

=== Director / Writer ===
Year	Title	Notes
2009	La première étoile	Alpe d'Huez International Comedy Film Festival - Grand Prix - Feature Film; Alpe d'Huez International Comedy Film Festival - Audience Award; Filmfest Hamburg - Audience Award; Nominated - César Award for Best First Feature Film
2012	30° couleur	
2016	Dieumerci !	
2016	Pourquoi nous détestent-ils, nous les Noirs?	Documentary
2017	Il a déjà tes yeux	
2017	La deuxième étoile	
