= Iuzzolino =

Iuzzolino is an Italian surname. Notable people with the surname include:

- Mike Iuzzolino (born 1968), American basketball player and coach
- Walter Iuzzolino (born 1968), Italian television producer
