= Aggy K. Adams =

British actress

- Born: Poland
- Occupation: Actress
- Years active: 2019–present
- Television: The Witcher

Aggy K. Adams (born 19 May 1995) is a British actress. Her television roles have included The Witcher (2023). She had a lead role in the film Oh, Ramona! (2019).

== Early life ==
She was born in Warsaw, Poland, before later living in the United States and eventually settling down with her family in the UK as a child.

== Career ==
In 2019, she appeared in the music video for Tom Walker single Just You and I. That year, she also appeared in the music video for the Stereophonics single Bust this Town.

In 2019 she appeared as Ramona in Romanian coming-of-age film Oh, Ramona!, broadcast internationally on Netflix. The film won the Audience Award at the 2020 Gopo Awards in Romania.

In 2023, she appeared in the French television series Greek Salad for Amazon Prime Video alongside Megan Northam. She appeared as Iskra, a member of the criminal gang The Rats in Netflix series The Witcher, although a planned spin-off prequel series The Rats was reportedly shelved in 2024. In 2024, she appeared in science-fiction film Altered alongside Tom Felton.

In 2025, she appears in the second series of Channel 4 series The Couple Next Door.

== Personal life ==
She has lived in both London and Paris.

== Partial filmography ==
Year	Title	Role	Notes
2019	Oh, Ramona!	Ramona	Film
2021	Les Petits Meurtres d'Agatha Christie	Jane Mallory	1 episode
2023	The Perfect Escape	Franky	
2023	Greek Salad	Lily	8 episodes
2023	The Witcher	Iskra	
2024	Altered	Mira	Feature film
2025	The Couple Next Door		TV series
2025	The Rats: A Witcher Tale	Iskra	Netflix Television special
