= La rebelle: Les aventures de la jeune George Sand =

- Genre: Biopic
- Based on: Georges Sand
- Developed by: France 2, UMedia, RTBF
- Starring: Nine D'Urso and Barbara Pravi
- Original language: French
- No. of seasons: 1
- No. of episodes: 4

Production
- Running time: 52 mins

Original release
- Network: RTBF La Trois; France 2
- Release: 7 January – 14 January 2025

La Rebelle: Les aventures de la jeune George Sand (also known as Rebelle, La Rebelle or GEORGE Untamed Spirit) is a French-Belgian television series directed by Rodolphe Tissot based on screenplay by Henri Helman, Georges-Marc Benamou, Rodolphe Tissot and Élodie Monlibert. It portrays the life of Georges Sand. The main roles are portrayed by model Nine D'Urso and singer-songwriter Barbara Pravi.

It is a co-production by Siècle Productions, the Belgian companies Umedia and Be-FILMS, RTBF and Pictanovo, produced for France 2 with the participation of France Télévisions and CNC.

== Cast ==
1. Nine D'Urso as George Sand
2. Barbara Pravi as Marie Dorval
3. Megan Northam as Pauline de Beaumont
4. Vincent Londez as Caisimir Dudevant
5. Oscar Lesage as Alfred de Musset
6. Jonathan Turnball as Hippolyte
7. Louisiana Governor as Josette
8. Marie Oppert as Eugénie Duvernet
9. Jonas Wertz as Charles Duvernet
10. Joaquim Fossi as Gustave Papet
11. Jacques Bonnaffé as Duris-Dufresne
12. Aymeric Fougernon as Jules Sandeau
13. Anton Csaszar as Honore de Balzac
14. Emilien Diard-Detoeuf as Sainte-Beuve
15. Lorenzo Lefebvre as Prosper Mérimée
16. Louis Berthelemy as Alfred de Vigny
17. Michael Lumière as Alexandre Dumas
18. Grégoire Oestermann as Joseph Deschartres
19. Oscar Tresanini as Young Maurice
20. Ambrine Trigo Ouaked as Young Solange
21. Astrid Whetnell as Sophie Dupin
22. Philippe Torreton as Bertrand Renault
23. Fabrizio Rongione as Henri de Latouche
24. Yoann Blanc as Michel de Bourges
25. Charlie Nelson as Judge Prevost
26. Jean-Pierre Becker as Judge Charles-Marie de Morlaix
27. Pierre Bénézit as Judge Rigoux

== Production ==
It is directed by Rodolphe Tissot, with screenplay by Tissot, Henri Helman, Georges-Marc Benamou and Élodie Monlibert.

It is a co-production by Siecle Productions, U-Media, Be-FILMS, RTBF and Pictanovo, produced for France 2 with the participation of France Télévisions and the CNC.

The main roles are played by Nine D'Urso (daughter of model Inès de La Fressange and Luigi D'Urso) and Barbara Pravi (who notably represented France at the Eurovision Song Contest 2021).

Filming took place between 26 April and 22 June 2024.
