= Katie Clarkson-Hill =

English actress

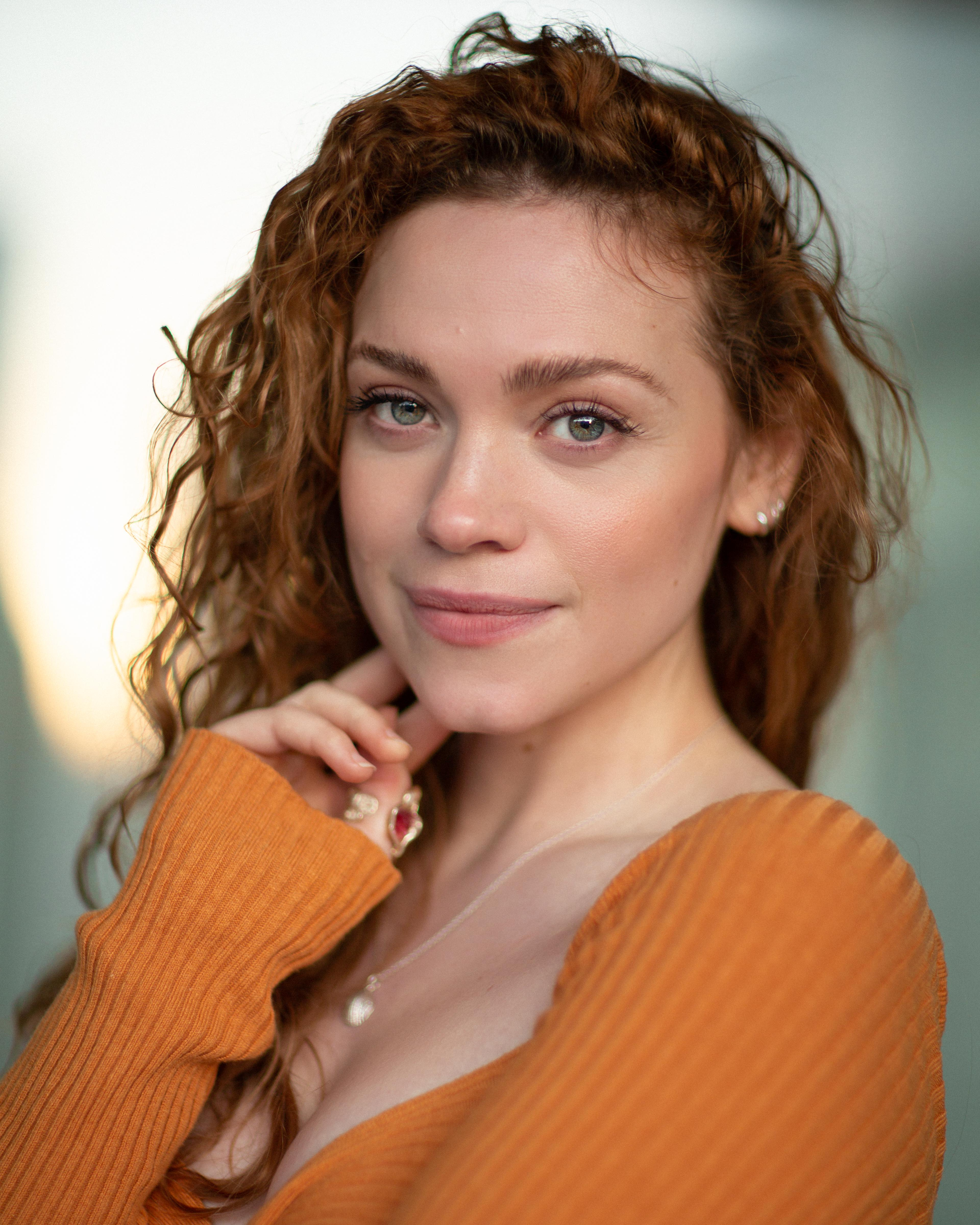

Katie Clarkson-Hill (born Katie Clarke) is an English actress.

== Early life ==
From Doncaster, she attended The McAuley Catholic High School. She changed her professional name to Clarkson-Hill as Katie Clarke was already registered.

== Career ==
Clarkson-Hill made her acting start in a widely-seen 2015 advertisement for Wrigley's chewing gum entitled Sarah and Juan, in which she played an American high-schooler in love, set to a cover of Can't Help Falling in Love by Haley Reinhart, which garnered on-line praise. Her early television roles included long-running BBC serials Doctors and Holby City.

In 2019, Clarkson-Hill had a main role as Dr Zoe Wade in the second series of BBC One hospital drama Trust Me alongside John Hannah and Alfred Enoch. She appeared in the second series of Amazon Prime Video drama series Hanna and the American series Guilt. In 2023, she could be seen in Channel 4 series The Couple Next Door. She has an upcoming role in Catalyst Studios film Switch & Bait alongside Otmara Marrero, directed by Michelle Salcedo. In 2024, she could be seen in racing drama film Race for Glory: Audi vs. Lancia with Riccardo Scamarcio, and British mystery drama series The Wives. She went on to appear as Daisy Stokes in BBC psychological thriller series The Rapture (2026).

== Filmography ==
Key
†	Denotes works that have not yet been released

Year	Title	Role	Notes
2015	Vera	Jade	1 episode
2015	Doctors	Maggie	1 episode
2015	Holby City	WPC Anna Brady	1 episode
2016	Scott & Bailey	Wendy	1 episode
2016	Guilt	Charlotte Crockleby	6 episodes
2017	London Heist	Holly	Film
2018	The Innocents	Sam	1 episode
2019	Grantchester	Sadie Parker	2 episodes
2019	Trust Me	Dr Zoe Wade	Main role (second series)
2019	Gold Digger	Heidi	2 episodes
2020	Hanna	Joanne McCoy	6 episodes
2023	The Couple Next Door	Rachel	3 episodes
2023	Final Fantasy XVI	Mid	Video Game
2024	Race for Glory: Audi vs. Lancia	Jane McCoy	Film
2024	Casualty	Fern Cross	2 episodes
2024	The Wives	Jade	
2026	The Rapture	Daisy Stokes	TV series
2026	Marble Hall Murders	Gillian Crace	TV series
TBA	Switch & Bait†		
