= Agnès Hurstel =

French actress, comedian and radio columnist

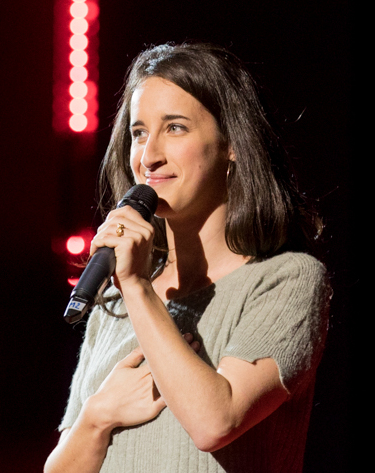
- Hurstel in 2017
- Born: 5 September 1990 (age 36); Toulouse, France
- Occupations: Actress; comedian; radio columnist
- Years active: 2015–present

Agnès Hurstel (born 5 September 1990) is a French actress, comedian and radio columnist. She is co-creator, co-writer and lead actress of the series Jeune et Golri (2021–present), which won the award for best French series at Series Mania in August 2021.

== Biography ==
Agnès Hurstel was born on 5 September 1990 at Clinique Ambroise Paré in Toulouse. She obtained her baccalaureate in 2008 at the Lycée Français Charles de Gaulle. She completed a literary preparation course (hypokhâgne, khâgne) at the Lycée Chaptal in Paris followed by degrees in modern literature and theatre acting at the Université Sorbonne Nouvelle – Paris 3. She started performing stand-up in 2015.

In 2018, she replaced Alison Wheeler as a columnist on the France Inter radio show La Bande originale, hosted by Nagui.

In 2021, she played in the lead role Prune of the OCS series Jeune et Golri for which she is also co-creator and co-writer. The series won awards for best French series and best original score at the Series Mania festival in Lille.

In 2022, she played a main supporting role in the comedy film On sourit pour la photo by François Uzan. She also starred in the film Final Cut by Michel Hazanavicius, a remake of the Japanese film One Cut of the Dead (2017), which opened the Cannes Film Festival of the same year.

== Theatre ==
- 2016 : Agnès bande at Le Sonar't
- 2016–2017 : Agnès Hurstel - Ma bite et mon couteau at Le Sonar't and Le Sentier des Halles
- 2017–2019 : Agnès Hurstel - Avec ma bouche at Le Sentier des Halles and Théâtre du Rond-Point

== Filmography ==
=== Feature films ===
Year	Title	Role	Notes
2015	Venir sur ses pas	Fémis	
2017	Bad Buzz	la première infirmière	
2017	Garde alternée	Juliette l'étudiante	
2018	Ami-ami	la joueuse au Time's Up	
2018	Les Affamés	Maud	
2020	Trop d'amour	Agnès	Also screenwriter
2022	On sourit pour la photo	Karine Hamelin	
2022	Final Cut	Laura	
2023	Un homme heureux	Marie Leroy	
2023	Yannick	la préposée du vestiaire	
2023	Daaaaaalí!	Lucie	
2024	The Good Teacher	Laura	
2024	Silex and the City	Lémurielle (voice)	

=== Short films ===
Year	Title	Role	Director	Notes
2015	Une homme est un femme		Baptiste Drapeau	
2016	La nuit ensemble	Désirée	Paloma Veinstein	
2016	Münster	Hilla	Martin Le Chevallier	
2018	Auguste	Joséphine	Olivia Baum	
2018	Brazil		Mathilde Elu	
2019	Une fille moderne	Léa	Noé Debré	
2022	La Reconnaissance de caractères	Marion	Fabien Commoy	

=== Television ===
Year	Title	Role	Notes
2016	Le Passe-muraille	Retirement home nurse	TV film
2016	What the Fuck France	—N/a	Screenwriter; 4 episodes
2016	WorkinGirls	Medical intern	Screenwriter; 3 episodes
2017	Loulou	—N/a	Screenwriter
2018–present	50 nuances de Grecs	Artémis / Circé / Vassiliki	Voice
2018	Patriot	Doctor	Episode: "Loaded"
2021–present	Jeune et Golri	Prune	16 episodes; also co-creator, director, screenwriter
2023	Greek Salad	Juliette	3 episodes; also screenwriter
