= Urchin (2025 film) =

British drama film

- Theatrical release poster
- Directed by: Harris Dickinson
- Written by: Harris Dickinson
- Produced by: Archie Pearch; Scott O’Donnell
- Starring: Frank Dillane; Megan Northam; Karyna Khymchuk; Shonagh Marie; Amr Waked
- Cinematography: Josée Deshaies
- Edited by: Rafael Torres Calderón
- Music by: Alan Myson
- Production companies: Devisio Pictures; Somesuch; BBC Film; BFI; Tricky Knot
- Distributed by: Picturehouse Entertainment
- Release dates: 17 May 2025 (Cannes); 3 October 2025 (United Kingdom)
- Running time: 99 minutes
- Country: United Kingdom
- Language: English
- Box office: $1.1 million

Urchin is a 2025 British drama film written and directed by Harris Dickinson, in his feature-length directorial debut. Starring Frank Dillane, Megan Northam, Karyna Khymchuk, Shonagh Marie and Amr Waked.

The film had its world premiere at the Un Certain Regard section of the 78th Cannes Film Festival on 17 May 2025, where Dickinson won the FIPRESCI Prize and Dillane won the section's Best Actor award. It was theatrically released in the United Kingdom by Picturehouse Entertainment on 3 October 2025.

== Plot ==
Mike is a homeless young man in London, struggling with addiction and poverty. One morning, he accepts money from an older couple, but then notices a mysterious older woman playing violin and staring at him. He later discovers his wallet is missing and accuses his friend Nathan of stealing it. They fight outside a café until a man, Simon, intervenes. Mike recovers his wallet but apologises to Simon, who offers to help him by getting him a sandwich.

However, as they walk, Mike suddenly knocks Simon unconscious, steals his watch, and rushes to a pawn shop to sell it. Outside, he is arrested, confronted with CCTV evidence, and remanded to prison. He calls his mother—who gives a cold response—and is processed into custody.

Upon release, Mike is warned by the prison officer not to return. He meets social worker Nadia, who supports his reintegration, and is placed in a hostel temporarily. He reveals to her that he is adopted and has no meaningful family support. One night, Mike hears odd breathing and sees the violin woman again, then later showers as the camera follows a surreal drain-pipe into a dark, cavernous space.

Mike finds clothes at a charity shop for a chef job interview but flees when Nathan appears. During the interview, he confesses his criminal record. The restaurant owner, Franco, hires him for a trial shift. Mike integrates into the kitchen staff and continues meeting with Nadia, where he learns that a mediated meeting with Simon is forthcoming.

At work, Mike is asked to handle a food complaint by a customer—something he resists but ultimately does. Frustrated, he storms off into the kitchen storeroom, eventually cutting into another dream‑like vision of the cave. During his mediated meeting, Simon shares the distress the incident caused his daughter and family, which visibly unsettles Mike.

Back at work, Mike’s performance declines; food is returned and he clashes with a coworker. Franco fires him, citing unreliability. Mike reverts to his former job as a refuse collector. He is paired with Andrea, with whom he bonds. They sleep together and later attend a dance show, where Mike has flashbacks that reveal he beat Simon repeatedly after knocking him out. Horrified by his own actions, he flees.

Mike’s insecurity escalates: his hostel stay ends, he returns to the streets, and tries reconnecting with Nathan. He finds Nathan sober and living with a woman named Mary. Mike borrows some money but attempts to take more; Nathan reclaims the excess, and Mary returns, calm but distant. Mike spirals further, becoming intoxicated and confrontational in a nightclub. A bouncer throws Mike into a wall, and while trying to steal liquor inside of a shop, he passes out.

Later, Mike returns to where he kept his shelter months ago. After ingesting drugs, Mike sees the violin player walk out from a dark space behind him. He follows behind her and enters a large stone hallway. He is pulled down to the ground and toward a chapel room, which he enters on his own. Inside, the violin player is preparing something. Mike wanders into another room, where Nathan is seated in a robe in front of an altar with a head sculpt on it. The pair hug, and Nathan leads Mike to a door. Nathan abruptly opens the door and throws Mike through it, sending him tumbling through a void. Eventually, Mike seems content, and curls into the fetal position as he disappears into darkness.

== Cast ==
- Frank Dillane as Mike
- Megan Northam as Andrea
- Karyna Khymchuk as Ramona
- Shonagh Marie as Chanelle
- Amr Waked as Franco
- Harris Dickinson as Nathan
- Ruth Wilson as the voice of Meditation Tape

== Production ==
=== Development ===
The film was directed by Harris Dickinson in his feature length debut. It was produced by Devisio Pictures, a production company Dickinson launched with producer Archie Pearch. Dickinson has described it as being about mental health and "people who fall between the cracks" and "the ways in which the system fails people in certain ways.” Scott O’Donnell served as a producer on the film which received British Film Institute (BFI) Filmmaking Fund production support in 2024.

=== Casting ===
The cast was led by Frank Dillane and included Megan Northam, Amr Waked, Karyna Khymchuk and Shonagh Marie.

=== Filming ===
Principal photography began in London in May 2024. In January 2025, Dickinson confirmed on the Empire Magazine podcast that the film was in post-production.

== Release ==
Urchin premiered in the Un Certain Regard section at the 2025 Cannes Film Festival on 17 May 2025.

In July 2025, 1-2 Special acquired distribution rights to Urchin in North America and has plans to release the film sometime in fall 2025. Later that month, Picturehouse Entertainment acquired UK and Irish distribution rights to the film, scheduling it for a theatrical release on October 3, 2025.

== Reception ==
=== Critical response ===
On the review aggregator website Rotten Tomatoes, 96% of 105 critics' reviews are positive, with an average rating of 7.6/10. The website's consensus reads: "Urchin is an emotionally raw debut from Harris Dickinson, whose introspective direction and clear-eyed compassion find a perfect match in Frank Dillane's [sic] unflinchingly authentic performance." Metacritic assigned the film a weighted average score of 77 out of 100 based on 29 critics, indicating "generally favorable" reviews.

Time Out compared it to the work of Andrea Arnold and suggested that "Dillane has an uncanny ability to make us sympathise with Mike – even when he’s acting heinously." Showbiz by PS praised Dickinson for steering away from clichés and delving into deeper societal commentary through its supporting characters. The Guardian's Peter Bradshaw called the film "a terrific directorial debut," and gave the film four stars out of five. Sondermann from The Upcoming gave the same ranking and wrote "If Dickinson continues on this path as a filmmaker, his name could well join the ranks of those shaping contemporary British realism."

=== Accolades ===
The film received six nominations at the British Independent Film Awards 2025, including for best British independent film, and lead performance for Frank Dillane, and best directorial debut for Harris Dickinson.

Award / Festival	Date of ceremony	Category	Recipient(s)	Result	Ref.
Cannes Film Festival	23 May 2025	Un Certain Regard Award	Harris Dickinson	Nominated	
Cannes Film Festival	23 May 2025	Un Certain Regard – Best Actor	Frank Dillane	Won	
Cannes Film Festival	24 May 2025	Camera d'Or	Harris Dickinson	Nominated	
Cannes Film Festival	24 May 2025	FIPRESCI Prize (Un Certain Regard)	Harris Dickinson	Won	
Miskolc International Film Festival	13 September 2025	Emeric Pressburger Prize	Urchin	Nominated	
Imagine Film Festival	9 November 2025	Méliès d'Argent Award	Urchin	Nominated	
British Independent Film Awards	30 November 2025	Best British Independent Film	Harris Dickinson, Archie Pearch, Scott O'Donnell	Nominated	
British Independent Film Awards	30 November 2025	Best Lead Performance	Frank Dillane	Nominated	
British Independent Film Awards	30 November 2025	Best Casting	Shaheen Baig	Nominated	
British Independent Film Awards	30 November 2025	Best Music Supervision	Bridget Samuels	Nominated	
British Independent Film Awards	30 November 2025	Douglas Hickox Award (Best Debut Director)	Harris Dickinson	Nominated	
British Independent Film Awards	30 November 2025	Breakthrough Producer	Archie Pearch	Nominated	
Gotham Independent Film Awards	1 December 2025	Breakthrough Director	Harris Dickinson	Nominated	
Astra Film Awards	9 January 2026	Best Indie Feature	Urchin	Nominated	
London Critics’ Circle Film Awards	1 February 2026	Breakthrough British/Irish Filmmaker of the Year	Harris Dickinson	Nominated	
London Critics’ Circle Film Awards	1 February 2026	Breakthrough Performer of the Year	Frank Dillane	Nominated	
