= Altered (2024 film) =

- Theatrical release poster
- Directed by: Timo Vuorensola
- Written by: Timo Vuorensola
- Produced by: Andreas Klein; Marko Moellers; Doris Pfardrescher; Juris Razgulajevs
- Starring: Tom Felton; Liza Bugulova; Richard Brake; Igor Jijikine; Aggy K. Adams
- Cinematography: Anton Bakarski
- Edited by: Serik Beyseu; Sergei Nesterov; Artemiy Shevchenko
- Music by: Tuomas Kantelinen
- Production companies: Art Galaxy; Splendid Entertainment; Studio Atlantic
- Distributed by: Well Go USA Entertainment
- Release dates: May 25, 2024 (2024 Cannes Film Festival); September 18, 2025 (Russia); November 21, 2025 (United States)
- Running time: 87 minutes
- Countries: USA, Kazakhstan
- Language: English
- Budget: $15 million
- Box office: $346,774

Altered is a 2024 American science fiction action film written and directed by Timo Vuorensola. It stars Tom Felton, Liza Bugulova, Richard Brake, Igor Jijikine, and Aggy K. Adams.

== Synopsis ==
In an alternate present where genetic enhancements have become the norm, those who cannot take advantage are pushed into the underground. It's up to a few people to level the playing field for everyone, but every revolution has its cost.

== Cast ==
- Tom Felton as Leon
- Liza Bugulova as Chloe
- Richard Brake as Kessler
- Igor Jijikine as Hughes
- Aggy K. Adams as Mira
- Sergey Tsyrulnikov as Gang Member
- Aleksey Filimonov as Howard

== Production ==
In May 2024, it was revealed that a science fiction action film written and directed by Timo Vuorensola was in development, with Tom Felton, Liza Bugulova, Richard Brake, Igor Jijikine and Aggy K. Adams joining the cast. Filming took place in Astana, Kazakhstan.

== Release ==
Altered premiered at the 2024 Cannes Film Festival. In August 2025, it was announced that the film would receive its theatrical release in Russia on 18 September. It was released in the United States in limited theaters on November 21, 2025.

== Reception ==
On the review aggregator website Rotten Tomatoes, 10% of 10 critics' reviews are positive, with an average rating of 3.3/10.
