= Rabia (2024 film) =

French drama film

- Directed by: Mareike Engelhardt
- Screenplay by: Mareike Engelhardt; Samuel Doux
- Produced by: Lionel Massol; Pauline Seigland
- Starring: Megan Northam; Natacha Krief; Lubna Azabal
- Cinematography: Agnes Godard
- Production companies: Films Grand Huit; Arte France Cinéma; Starhaus Production; Kwassa Films; RTBF
- Release date: 2024
- Countries: France; Belgium; Germany
- Language: French

Rabia is a 2024 French-language film directed by Mareike Engelhardt and starring Megan Northam, Natacha Krief and Lubna Azabal.

== Premise ==
A young French girl, Jessica, leaves France to Syria in 2014, with her friend Laila, on the promise of a husband among the ISIS fighters. However, once in Raqqa, her name is changed to Rabia and she is introduced to the formidable Madame.

== Cast ==
- Megan Northam as Jessica
- Natacha Krief as Laila
- Lubna Azabal as Madame
- Léna Lauzemis as Oum Maryam
- Klara Wöedermann as Oum Mikaïl
- Maria Wöedermann as Oum Mansour
- Christine Gautier as Marie
- Andranic Manet as Le Combattant

== Production ==
The film is produced by Films Grand Huit in co-production with Arte France Cinéma, German company Starhaus Production and Belgium's Kwassa Films and RTBF. It is written and directed by Mareike Engelhardt, in her debut feature film. Director of photography is Agnés Godard. Engelhardt said she wished to explore how the propaganda and radicalisation of Islamic State would focus not on the war, but on "emotions, the desire for our life to have meaning, to belong to a family, to be loved."

Engelhardt wrote the script with Samuel Doux. In 2019, the project won the International Arte Kino Award at the Les Arcs Film Festival. Grand Huit’s Lionel Massol and Pauline Seigland produced the film, which entered principal photography in November 2022, and concluded in January 2023 with a cast led by Megan Northam and Lubna Azabal, and also including Natacha Krief, Léna Lauzemis, Klara and Maria Wöedermann, Christine Gautier and Andranic Manet. Filming took place in Dordogne and in Jordan.

== Release ==
The film was released in France on 27 November 2024.

== Reception ==
Megan Northam was nominated for the 2025 César Award for Best Female Revelation for her role as Jessica in the film.
