= Marie Oppert =

French singer and actress (born 1997)

- Born: 1997 (age 28–29)
- Occupations: Singer; actress
- Years active: 2008–present

Marie Oppert is a French singer and actress, born in 1997.

== Biography ==
Oppert, the daughter of musician parents, started the learning of the piano and the clarinet at a yong age. During her childhood, she joined the choir of the College School of Paris (Conservatoire à rayonnement régional de Paris) and made her first stage appearance in 2008 in the musical "Pinocchio's Journey" ("Le Voyage de Pinocchio"), directed by Sandrine Anglade. In 2009, she played Marta in the musical "The Sound of Music" ("La Mélodie du Bonheur") at the Théâtre du Châtelet and played Brigitta in the musical's 2011 repeat. She was the violinist in the 2013 British production of "Street Scene" from Kurt Weill in the Théâtre du Châtelet. The same year, she performed at the Salle Pleyel as "Mi Bémol" in "Le Clavier Fantastique", the children's opera of Graciane Finzi by Jules Verne.

Her career took off in 2014, when she first played the young Alice from Lewis Carroll in the show "Alice, la Comédie Musicale" directed by Marina Pangos, which then led her to be Geneviève in "The Umbrellas of Cherbourg" by Jacques Demy and Michel Legrand at the Théâtre du Châtelet.

Alongside her start in the acting profession, she passed her baccalaureate exams in 2015 with the baccalaureate and enrolled at Marymount Manhattan College in New York City.

== Musical theater ==
- 2008: Le Voyage de Pinocchio of Sandrine Anglade from Collodi, theater of Cachan
- 2009: The Sound of Music from Richard Rodgers and Oscar Hammerstein II, Châtelet : Marta
- 2011: The Sound of Music, Châtelet : Brigitta
- 2013: Street Scene from Kurt Weill, Châtelet : the violinist
- 2013: Le Clavier fantastique from Graciane Finzi, salle Pleyel : Mi Bémol
- 2014: Alice, la comédie musicale, from Julien Goetz and Marina Pangos, from Lewis Carroll, théâtre Clavel : Alice
- 2014: Les Parapluies de Cherbourg from Jacques Demy and Michel Legrand : Geneviève

== Theater ==
- 2018: The Idiot from Dostoievski, theater 14 Jean-Marie Serreau
