= Lancia Fulvia =

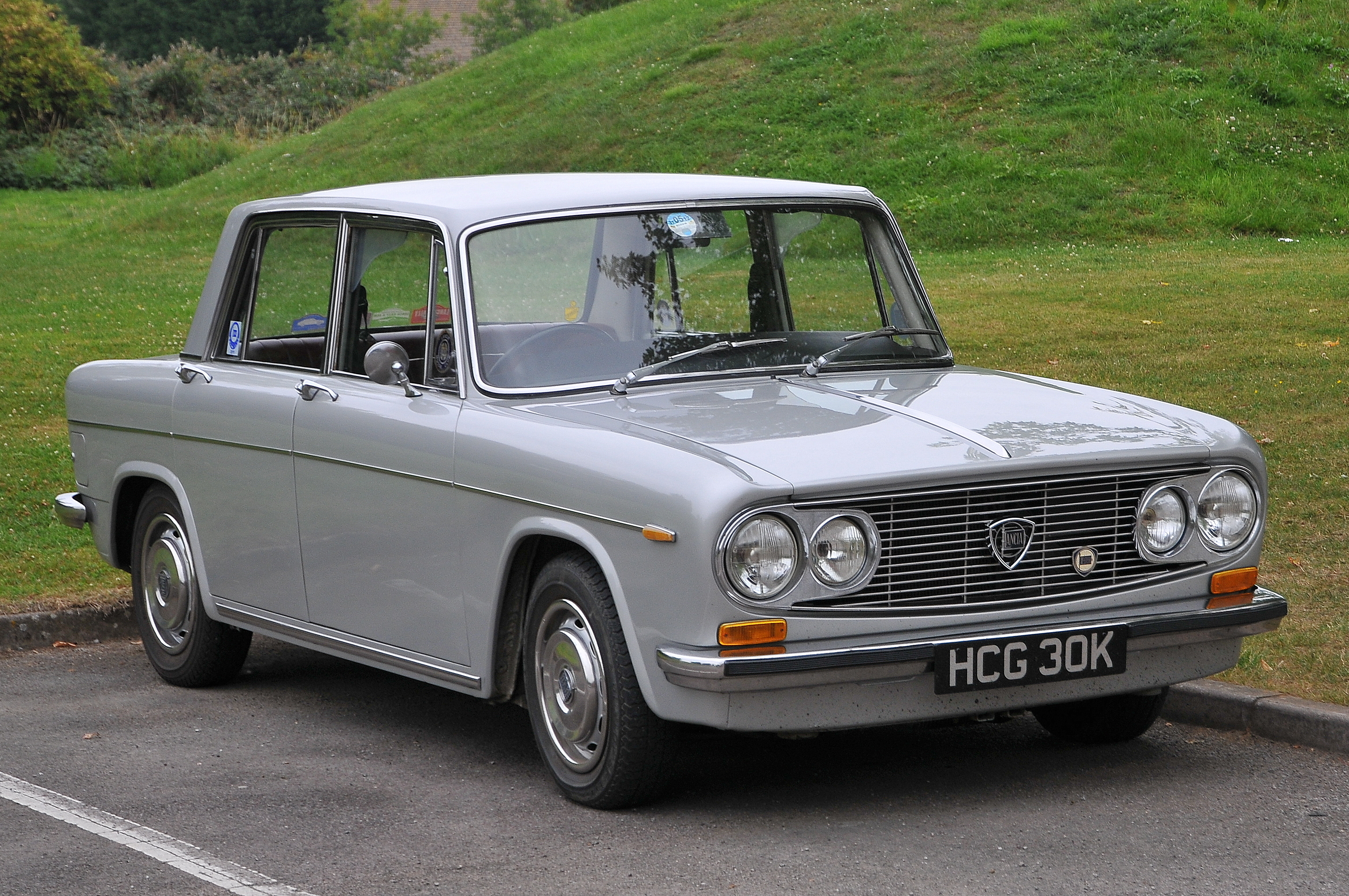
- Series II Lancia Fulvia Berlina

Overview
- Manufacturer: Lancia
- Production: 1963–1976
- Designer: Piero Castagnero at Centro Stile Lancia (Berlina and Coupé); Ercole Spada at Zagato (Sport)

Body and chassis
- Class: Large family car (D)
- Body style: 4-door saloon (Berlina); 2-door coupé (Coupé); 2-door fastback coupé (Sport)
- Layout: Front-engine, front-wheel-drive

Powertrain
- Engine: petrol: 1,091 cc Lancia V4; 1,199 cc Lancia V4; 1,216 cc Lancia V4; 1,231 cc Lancia V4; 1,298 cc Lancia V4; 1,584 cc Lancia V4
- Transmission: 4-speed manual 5-speed manual

Dimensions
- Wheelbase: 2,480 mm (97.6 in) (Berlina 1963–69); 2,500 mm (98.4 in) (Berlina 1969–72); 2,330 mm (91.7 in) (Coupé, Sport)
- Length: 4,110 mm (161.8 in) (Berlina); 3,975 mm (156.5 in) (Coupé); 4,090 mm (161.0 in) (Sport)
- Width: 1,555 mm (61.2 in) (Berlina, Coupé); 1,570 mm (61.8 in) (Sport)
- Height: 1,400 mm (55.1 in) (Berlina); 1,300 mm (51.2 in) (Coupé); 1,200 mm (47.2 in) (Sport)

Chronology
- Predecessor: Lancia Appia
- Successor: Lancia Beta; Lancia Trevi (1980–1984)

The Lancia Fulvia (Tipo 818) is a car produced by Lancia between 1963 and 1976. Named after the Via Fulvia, a Roman road leading from Tortona to Turin, it was introduced at the Geneva Motor Show in 1963 and manufactured in three variants: Berlina 4-door saloon, 2-door Coupé, and Sport, an alternative fastback coupé designed and built by Zagato on the Coupé floorpan.

Fulvias are noted for their role in motorsport history, including a 1972 win of the International Rally Championship. Road & Track described the Fulvia as "a precision motorcar, an engineering tour de force".

Total production number of the Fulvia berlina was 192,097 cars, of the Fulvia Coupé 139,797 cars, and of the Fulvia Sport 7,102 cars.

== Specifications ==
=== Chassis ===
The Fulvia Berlina was designed by Antonio Fessia, to replace the Lancia Appia with which it shared almost no components. The Appia was a rear wheel drive car, however, while the Fulvia moved to front wheel drive like the Flavia. The general engineering design of the Fulvia was identical to that of the Flavia with the major exception of the engine, the Flavia having a four-cylinder horizontally opposed engine and the Fulvia a 'Narrow Angle' vee configuration as featured on most production Lancias from the Lambda. The Fulvia used a longitudinal engine mounted in front of its transaxle. An independent suspension in front used wishbones and a single leaf spring, while a beam axle with a panhard rod and leaf springs was used in back. Four wheel Dunlop disc brakes were fitted to first series Fulvias. With the introduction of the second series in 1970 the brakes were uprated with larger Girling calipers all round and a brake servo. The handbrake design was also changed - using separate drums and brake-shoes operating on the rear wheels.

=== Engine ===
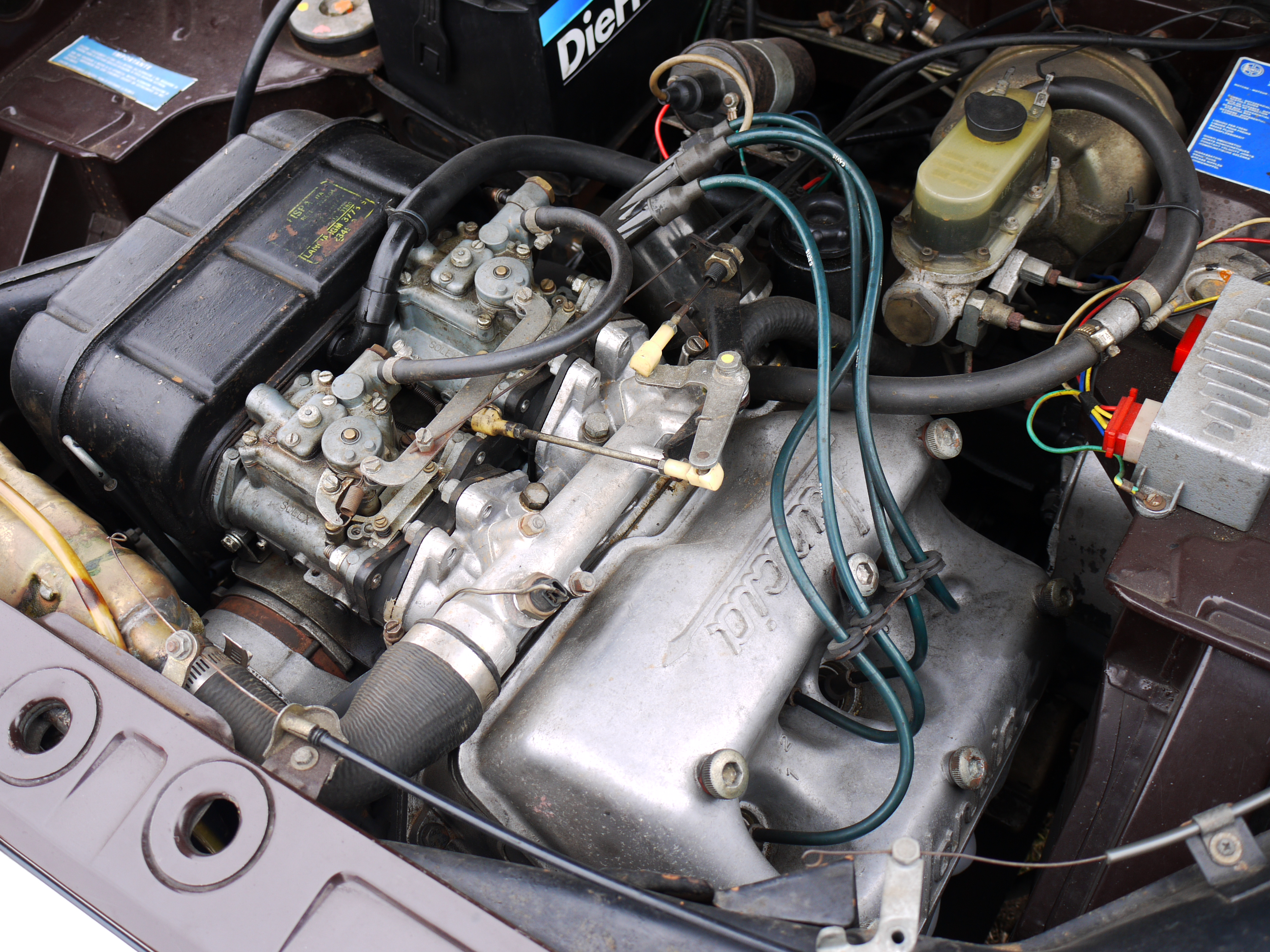
The V4 engine of a 1972 Fulvia Berlina

The Fulvia's narrow-angle DOHC Lancia V4 engine was mounted well forward at a 45° angle. A new design, by Zaccone Mina, its unusually narrow 12° V allowed a single cylinder head to cover all the cylinders, with one cam each for intake and exhaust valves.

Displacement started out at just 1091 cc, with a 72 mm bore and 67 mm stroke. Fitted with a single carburettor, the V4 produced 58 CV (43 kW; 57 hp). A higher (9.0:1) compression ratio and twin Solex carburettors raised power to 71 CV (52 kW; 70 hp) soon after.

The engine was bored to 76 mm for the 1216 cc HF model. With additional tuning output was raised from 80 to 88 CV (59 to 65 kW; 79 to 87 hp).

The engine was re-engineered with a slightly narrower bank angle (from 12°53'28" down to 12°45'28") and longer (69.7 mm) stroke for 1967. Three displacements were produced: 1199 cc (74 mm bore), 1231 cc (75 mm bore), and 1298 cc (77 mm bore). The new 1298 cc engine was produced in two versions; the type 818.302 produced 87 bhp (65 kW) at 6000 rpm and was fitted to first series Coupés, Sports and Berlina GTE and later to the second Series Berlina. The Type 818.303 was first produced with 92 CV (68 kW; 91 hp) and was fitted to the first series Coupé Rallye S and Sport S. For the second Series Coupé and Sport, power was slightly reduced to 90 CV (66 kW; 89 hp) at 6000 rpm. The 1199 cc engine was only fitted to the Berlina sold in Greece.

The engine was completely reworked for the new 1.6 HF with an even-narrower angle (now 11°20'), and a longer 75 mm stroke combined with a bore of 82 mm gave it a displacement of 1584 cc, and power ranged from 115 to 132 CV (85 to 97 kW; 113 to 130 hp) depending on tune.

== Model history ==
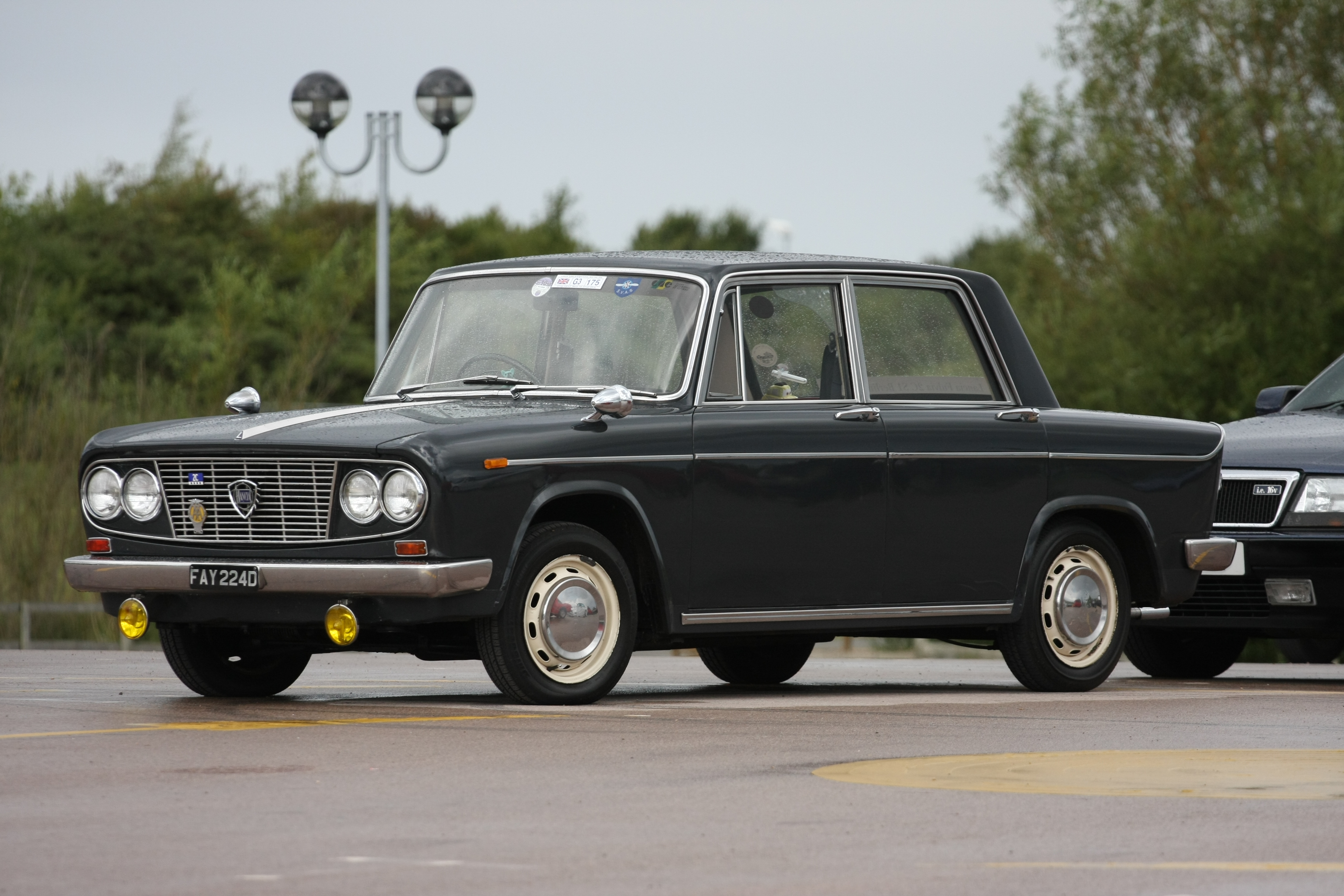
Series I Lancia Fulvia Berlina 2C

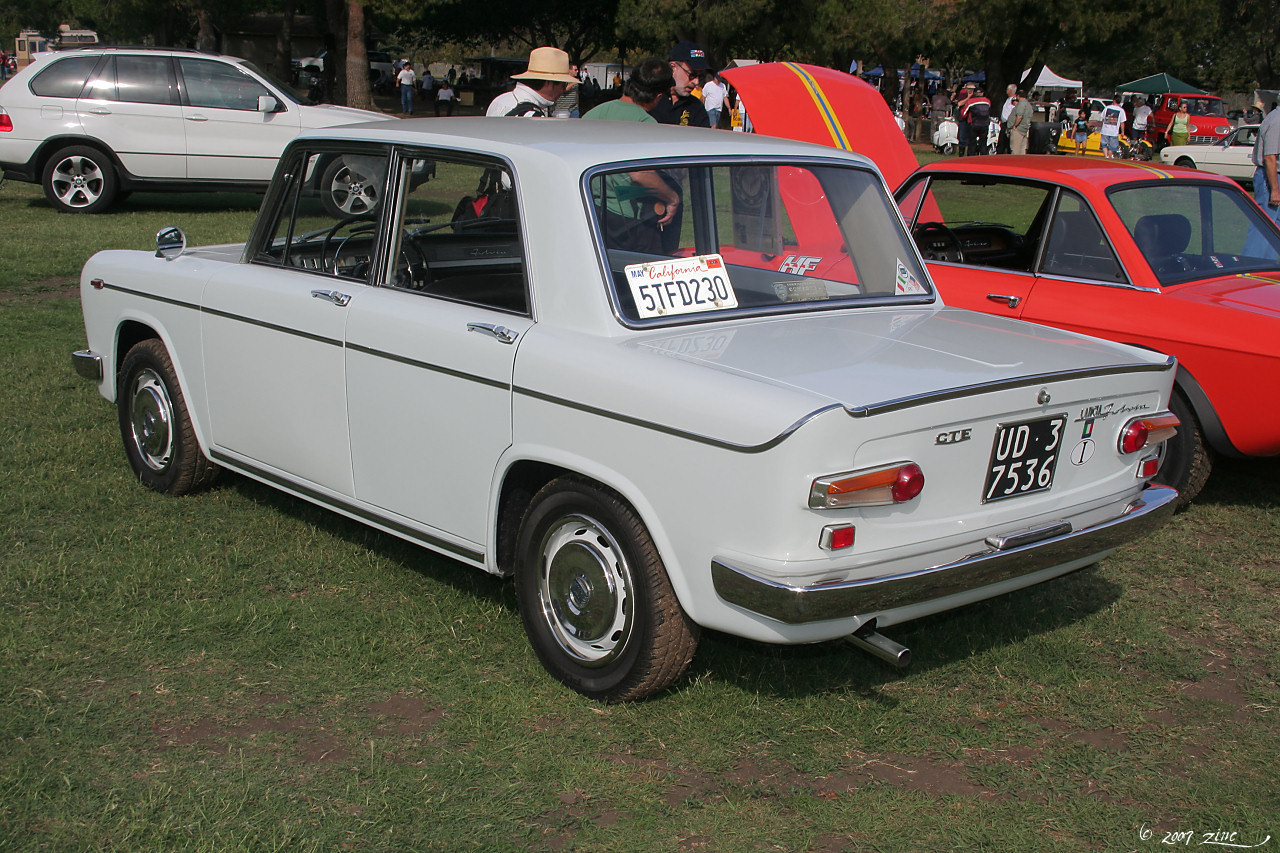
Lancia Fulvia Berlina GTE

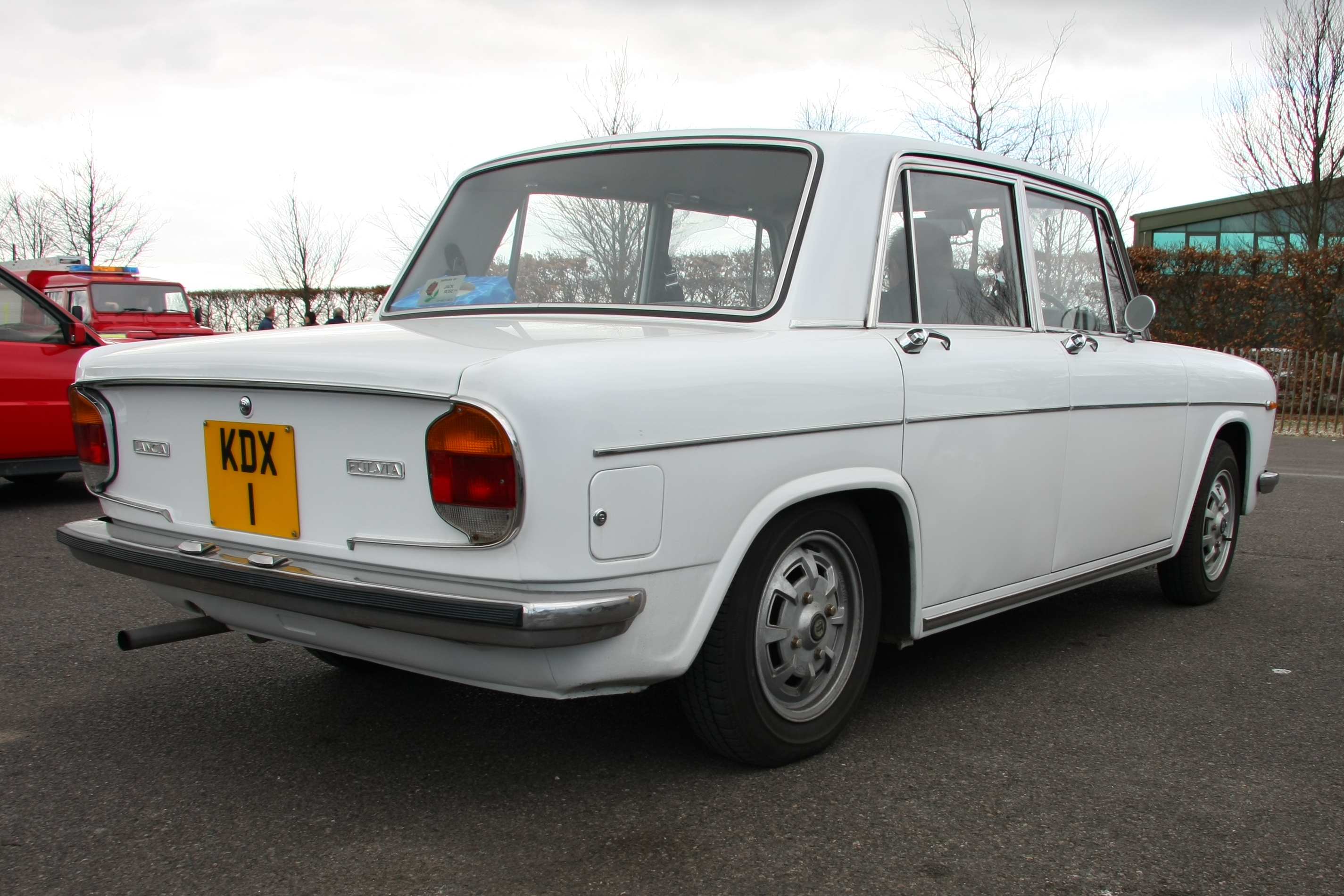
Rear view of a Series II Fulvia Berlina

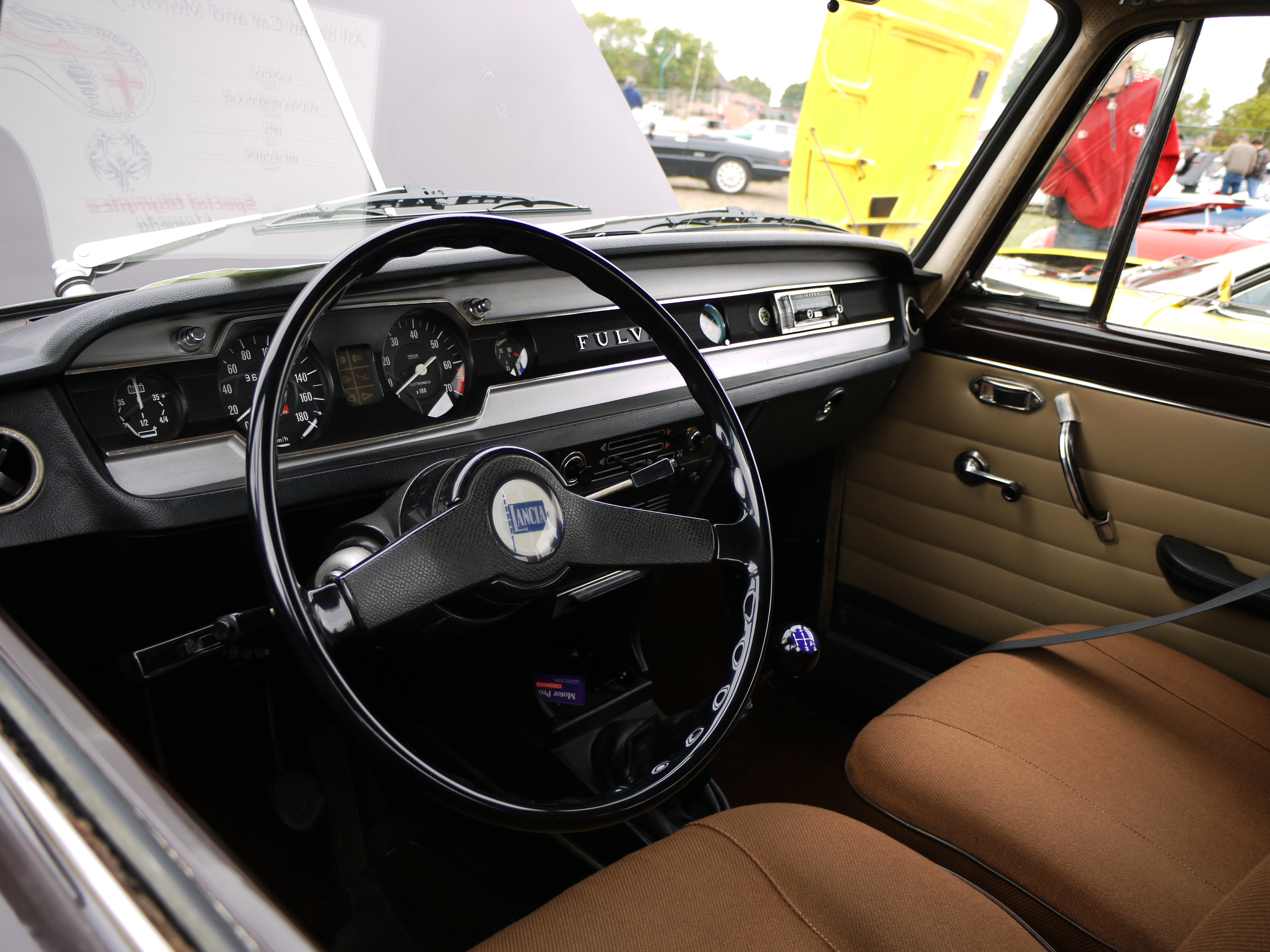
1972 Lancia Fulvia interior

=== Berlina ===
Series I

- Berlina (Tipo 818.000/001): 1963–1964. A compact four-door saloon introduced in 1963 with a 1091 cc, single twin-choke carburettor engine producing 58 bhp (43 kW) at 5800 rpm.
- Berlina 2C (Tipo 818.100/101): 1964–69. Improved, more powerful Berlina launched late in 1964, with a 71 bhp (53 kW) engine fitted with double twin-choke Solex carburettors. 155R14 Michelin X radial tyres. The body-shell also had revised front subframe mountings. Distinguished by an enamelled "2C" badge on the radiator grille and rear "Fulvia 2C" script.
- Berlina GT (Tipo 818.200/201/210/211): 1967–1968. Introduced at the 1967 Geneva Salon with the 1216 cc (later 1231 cc) engine from the Coupé, producing 80 bhp (60 kW) at 6000 rpm. Distinguished by an enamelled "GT" badge on the radiator grille and rear "Fulvia GT" script. Fitted with 155R14 Michelin X
- Berlina "Grecia" (Tipo 818.282/292): 1967–1969. Greece-only version fitted with a smaller 818.282 1.2 L (1,199 cc) engine, putting out 79 PS (58 kW; 78 hp) at 6200 rpm. 145R14 Pirelli Cinturato CA67 radial tyres
- Berlina GTE (Tipo 818.310/311): 1968–1969. Introduced in 1968 with the 1298 cc (818.302) engine from the Coupé Rallye 1.3, for an output of 87 bhp (65 kW) at 6000 rpm. In addition, the brakes were uprated with a brake servo, and fitted with 155 SR 14 Michelin ZX radial tyres

Series II

The Fulvia saloon was updated in August 1969 with a redesigned body on a 20 mm (0.8 in) longer wheelbase, and an updated interior. An altered roofline also provided more space for rear-seat passengers.

- Berlina (Tipo 818.610/611): 1969–1971. Series 2 was introduced in 1969 with the 1298 cc.
- Berlina "Grecia" (Tipo 818.682): 1969–1970. Series 2 Greece-only limited displacement version; the 818.282 1.2-litre engine was unchanged.
- Berlina (Tipo 818.612/613): 1970–1972. Series 2 with the 1298 cc (818.302) engine and 5-speed gearbox, introduced in 1970. Larger Girling callipers and pads replaced the Dunlop system fitted to first-series cars.
- Berlina "Grecia" (Tipo 818.694): 1970–1972. Updated with the 5-speed gearbox like the regular saloon.

=== Coupé ===
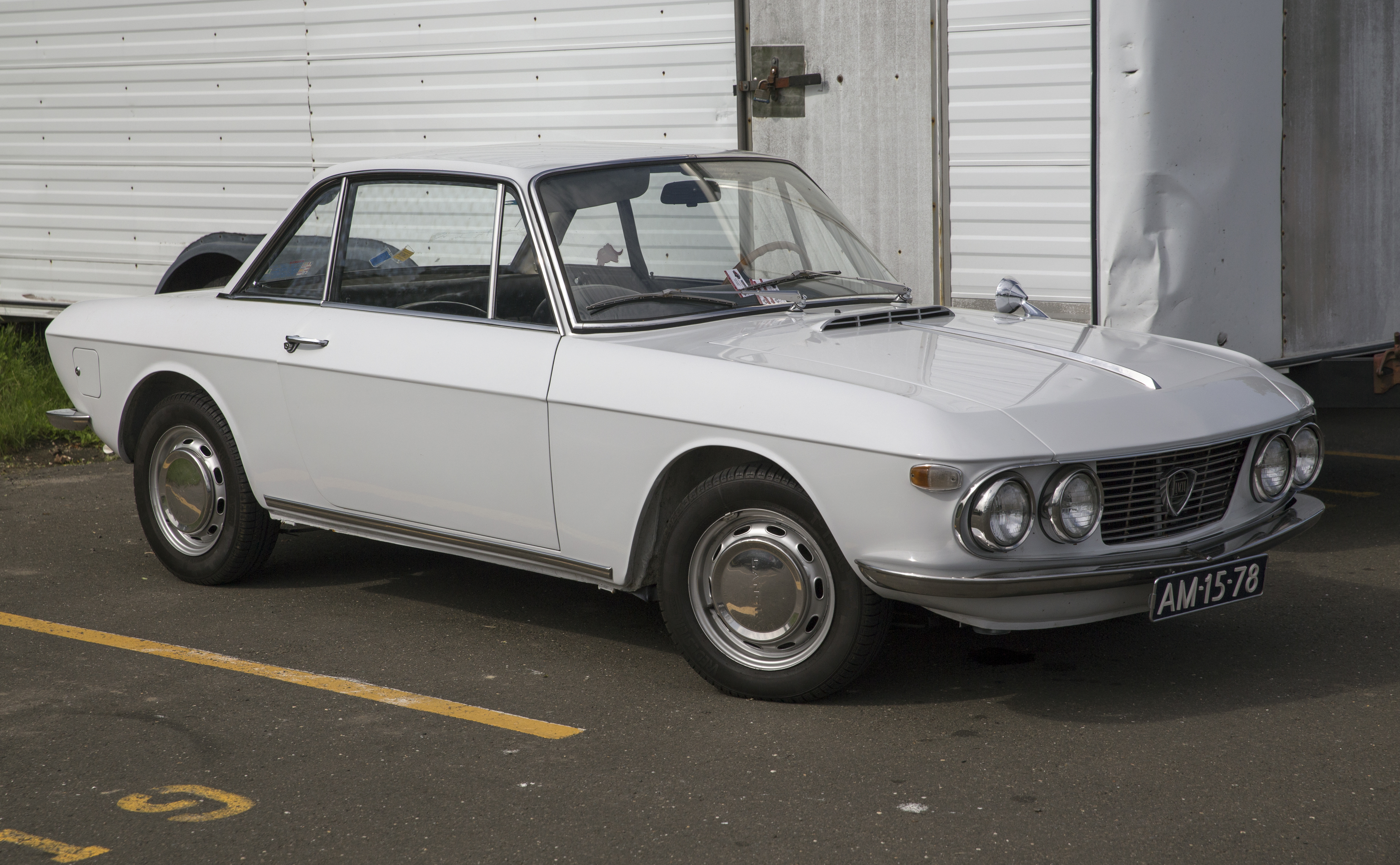
1968 Lancia Fulvia Coupé

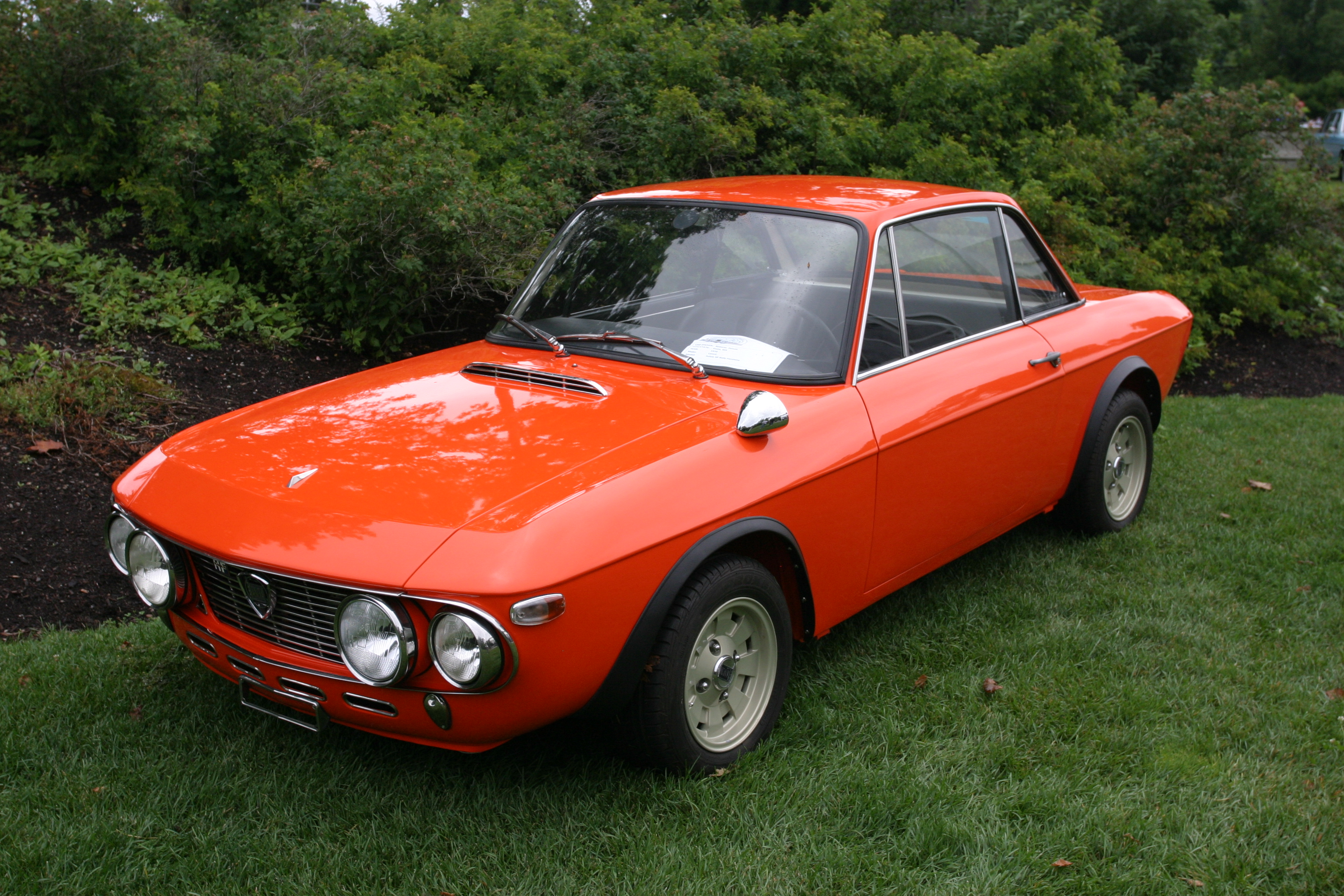
1970 Lancia Fulvia Rallye 1.6 HF Fanalone

The Fulvia Coupé was a compact two-door, three-box coupé introduced in 1965. Like the saloon it was designed in-house by Piero Castagnero, using a wheelbase 150 mm (5.9 in) shorter than its sedan counterpart. As the last Fulvia model to be discontinued, the coupe was ultimately replaced in 1977 by a 1.3-litre version of the Beta Coupé.

Series I

- Coupé (Tipo 818.130/131): 1965–1967. Equipped with a 1,216 cc 818.100 engine—from 1967 enlarged to 1,231 cc—producing 80 CV (59 kW; 79 hp) at 6,000 rpm. The same engines were subsequently used on the Berlina GT.
- Coupé HF (Tipo 818.140): 1966–1967. The competition version of the coupé, introduced later in 1965, carried a tuned version of the 1,216 cc engine producing 88 CV (65 kW; 87 hp) at 6,000 rpm. Bodywork was lightened by removing the bumpers, using an aluminium bonnet, doors and boot lid, Plexiglas side and rear windows, and bare steel wheels without hubcaps.
- Rallye 1.3 HF (Tipo 818.340/341): 1967–1969. 1.3-litre HF. New 1,298 cc engine with 101 CV (74 kW; 100 hp) at 6,400 rpm.
- Rallye 1.3 (Tipo 818.330/331): 1967–1968. An updated coupé with the 818.302 1,298 cc engine with 87 CV (64 kW; 86 hp) at 6,000 rpm.
- Rallye 1.3 S (Tipo 818.360/361): 1968–1970. Updated, more powerful Rallye 1.3 with a new 818.303 1,298 cc engine producing 92 CV (68 kW; 91 hp) at 6,000 rpm.
- Rallye 1.6 HF (Tipo 818.540/541): 1969–1970. Known as Fanalone ("big lamps") because of the characteristic upsized inner pair of headlamps. The evolution of Rallye 1.3 HF, equipped with an all-new 818.540 1,584 cc engine producing 115 CV (85 kW; 113 hp) at 6,500 rpm. Other changes included negative camber front suspension geometry, with light alloy 13 inch 6J wheels; and a close ratio 5-speed gearbox and wheel arch extensions. The easiest way to distinguish this version is by the triangular holes between headlamps and grille.
  - Rallye 1.6 HF tipo 818.540 variante 1016: 1969–1970. Works rally-spec Fanalone, produced in very limited numbers. The most powerful Fulvia with a 1,584 cc engine producing up to 132 CV (97 kW; 130 hp) depending on tune. This was the version used by the works rally team until 1974 when it was superseded in competition by the Stratos HF. 45 mm bore Solex carburettors were used that were later replaced by 45 DCOE Webers. The cam cover had a special blue stripe over the yellow paint job (HF cars had just a yellow paint job).

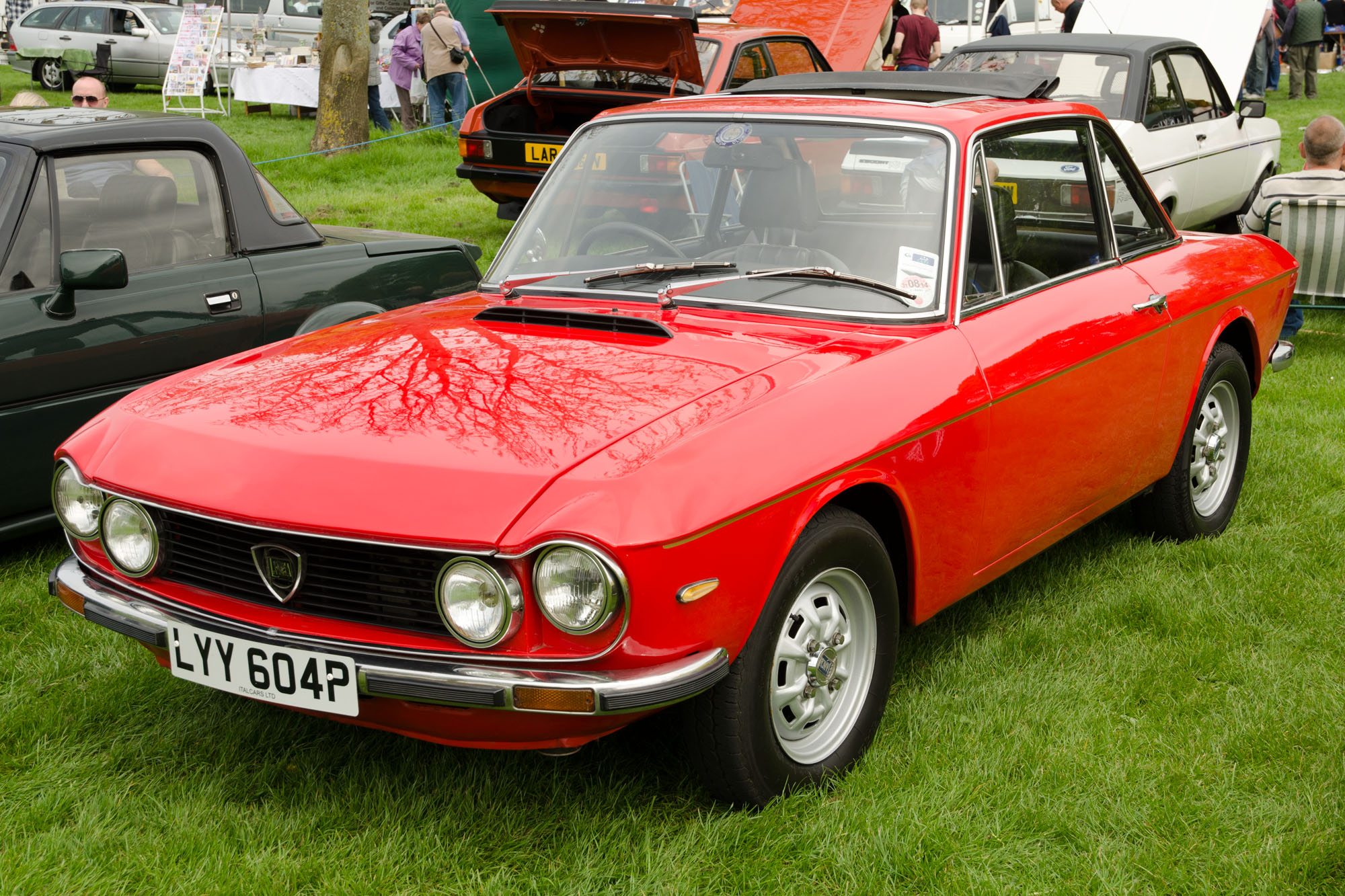
Lancia Fulvia Coupé 3

Series II

- Coupé 1.3 S (Tipo 818.630/631): 1970–1973. Face-lifted body and new 5 speed gearbox with 1298 cc (818.303) engine producing 90 CV (66 kW; 89 hp) at 6000 rpm. Larger Girling callipers and pads replaced the Dunlop system fitted to 1st series cars.
  - Coupé 1.3 S Montecarlo: 1972–1973. Special edition based on the 1.3 S, commemorating Lancia's victory at the 1972 Monte Carlo Rally. The livery resembled the works car, with matte black bonnet and boot lid bearing Monte Carlo rally plate-style stickers. This version used his own bodyshell with flared wheel arches, similar to the 1.6 HF bodyshell. Other accoutrements included 1.6 HF Lusso interior fittings such as bucket seats with headrests, rectangular front fog lamps, no bumpers and black single wing mirror; 4.5J steel wheels of the standard Coupé were fitted.
- Coupé 1600 HF (Tipo 818.740/741): 1970. Face-lifted all steel body with 1,584 cc engine with Solex C42DDHF carb producing 115 CV (85 kW; 113 hp) at 6,000 rpm. The bodywork was changed from the standard 1.3 Coupé to incorporate flared wheel arches (replacing the extensions used on 1st series HFs).

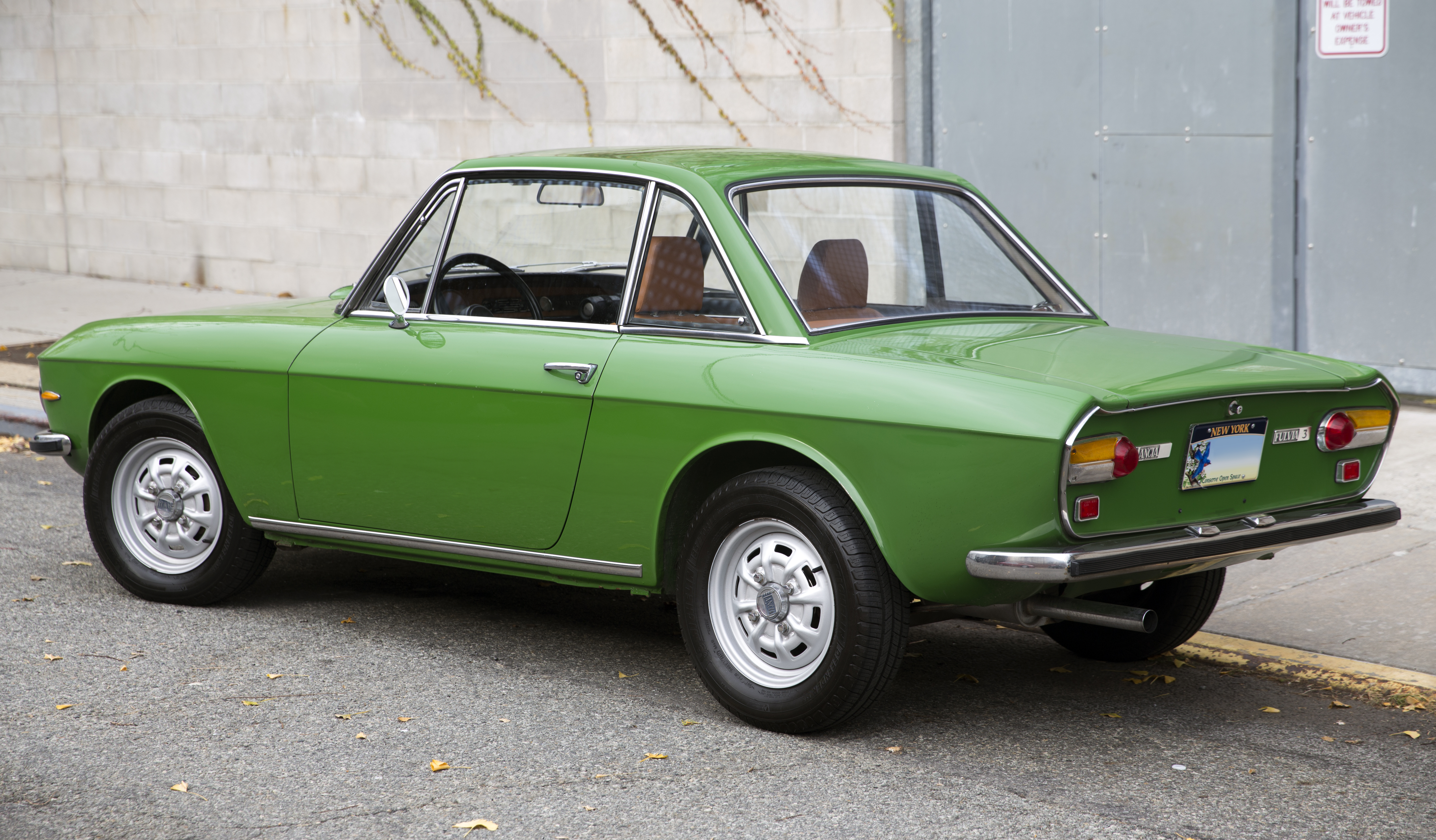
Lancia Fulvia Coupe 3 rear view

- Coupé 1600 HF "Lusso" (Tipo 818.740/741): 1970–1973. As 1600 HF, but with extra trim, radio and fitted with bumpers. Mostly produced for export.
- Coupé 3 (Tipo 818.630/631): 1974–1976. Updated Coupé introduced in 1974, mechanically the same as the earlier Series 2 1.3 S except for the addition of emission control on the Solex carburettors. Other than for "Fulvia 3" badges, it is easily recognized by its matte black grilled and headlight frame. It featured a new design of seats incorporating headrests and new white-faced instrument dials with an updated range of trim colours, materials and options.
  - Coupé 3 Montecarlo: 1974–1976. As the earlier Montecarlo, but with Coupé 3 accoutrements.
  - Safari: 1974–1976. A limited edition based on the standard Coupé 3 with simplified trim and equipment, celebrating Fulvia's participation in the Safari Rally. It came without bumpers, with matte black exterior trim, seats upholstered in denim cloth and leatherette, exterior badges on the bonnet and on the boot lid and also a special numbered plaque on the dashboard.

=== Sport ===
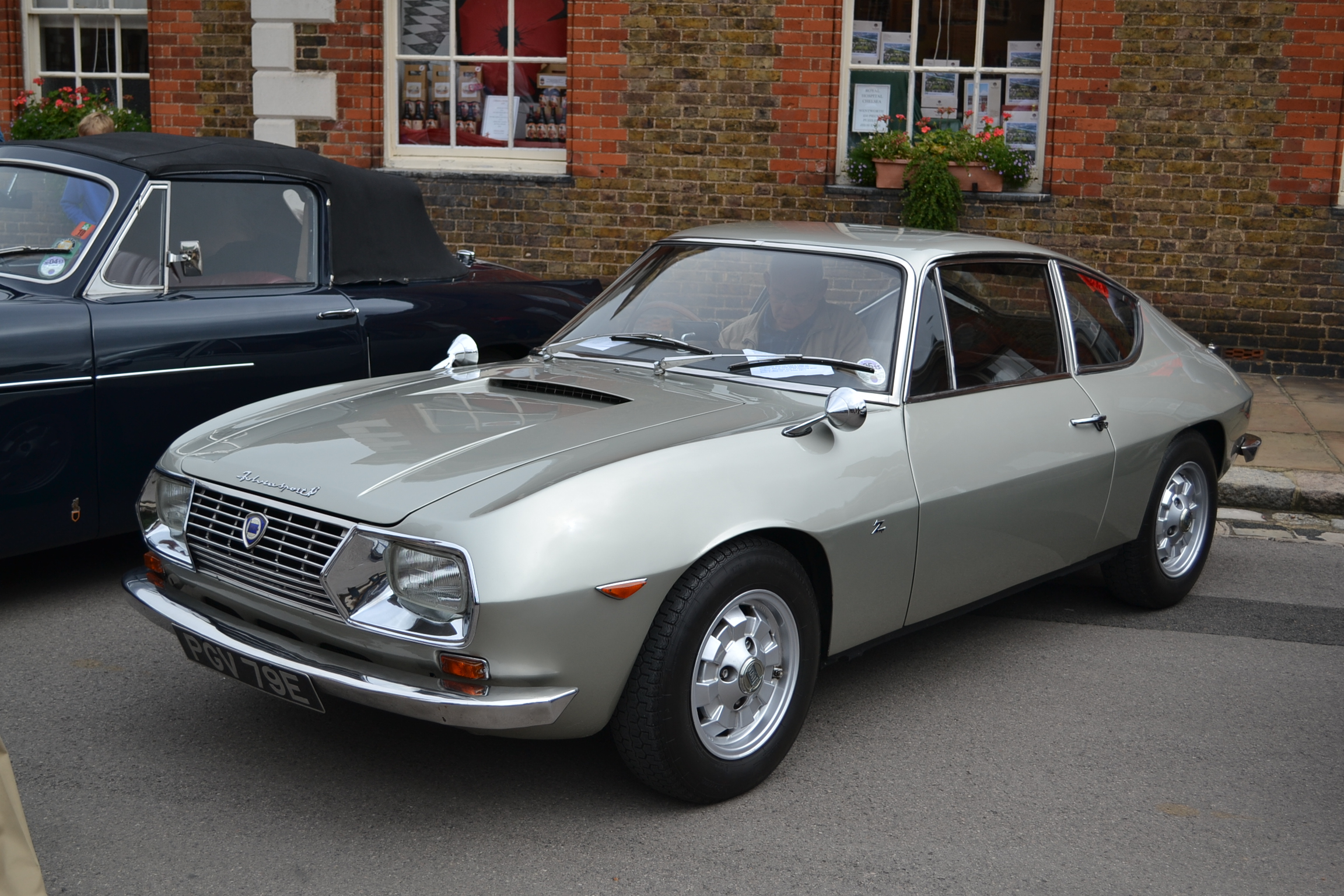
Series I Fulvia Sport 1.3 S

The Fulvia Sport was a fastback two-seater based on Coupé mechanicals, built for Lancia by Zagato — where it had also been designed, by Ercole Spada. The Sport was commissioned by Lancia to Zagato as more aerodynamic and sportier version of the coupé, which could be used in road and track competitions.

Series I

Three peculiarities of the Sport body were the engine bonnet, which was hinged to the right-hand side, the rear hatch, which could be lifted electrically by a handful of centimetres to aid cabin ventilation, and the spare wheel, which was housed in a separate compartment and accessed from a rotating panel which held the rear number plate. The tail lights were sourced from the NSU Prinz 4.

- Sport (Tipo 818.132/133): 1965–1967. Introduced at the 1965 Turin Motor Show, the first Sport had an all-aluminium alloy bodyshell and used the coupé's 1.2-litre (1,216 cc) engine. Inside it reprised the wood-trimmed dashboard of the coupé, and featured two small bucket seats of Zagato's own design. Just 202 were made in total.
- Sport 1.3 (Tipo 818.332/333): 1966–1969. In 1966 Sport was upgraded to an 818.302 1,298 cc engine from the Rallye 1.3, producing 87 hp (65 kW) at 6,000 rpm. Early versions still had all aluminium bodyshells (700 were produced with both 1,216 cc & 1,298 cc engines), but later ones were fitted with steel bodyshells with aluminium bonnet, doors, and spare wheel hatch. Whereas the first Sport was homologated as a two-seater, the car was now classified as a three-seater—or 2+1. The 1.3 can be distinguished from the 1.2 for its silver- instead of ivory-painted steel wheels, and the side mirror on the driver's side front wing.
- Sport 1.3 S (Tipo 818.362/363): 1968–1969. An updated Sport 1.3 with 1,298 cc (818.303) engine producing 92 hp (69 kW) at 6,000 rpm. These Sports were normally fitted with brake servos. It is recognizable by its larger hubcaps, decorated with Lancia flag logos instead of being plain.

Series II

The second series Fulvia Sport was launched at the 1970 Turin Motor Show. Changes included a 5-speed gearbox, revised suspension geometry, taller ride height, an alternator in place of the previous dynamo, a taller final drive compared to coupés, and wider tyres. The body was now all-steel, and seated 2+2 passengers. Some of the Zagato's most unusual features were lost: the bonnet was now hinged at the front, and the spare wheel compartment hatch was deleted. Several other changes set the second series apart from the first: new driving lights, a side mirror moved from the wing to the door, larger bullet-shaped tail lights from the Peugeot 204, and stamped steel wheels without hubcaps.

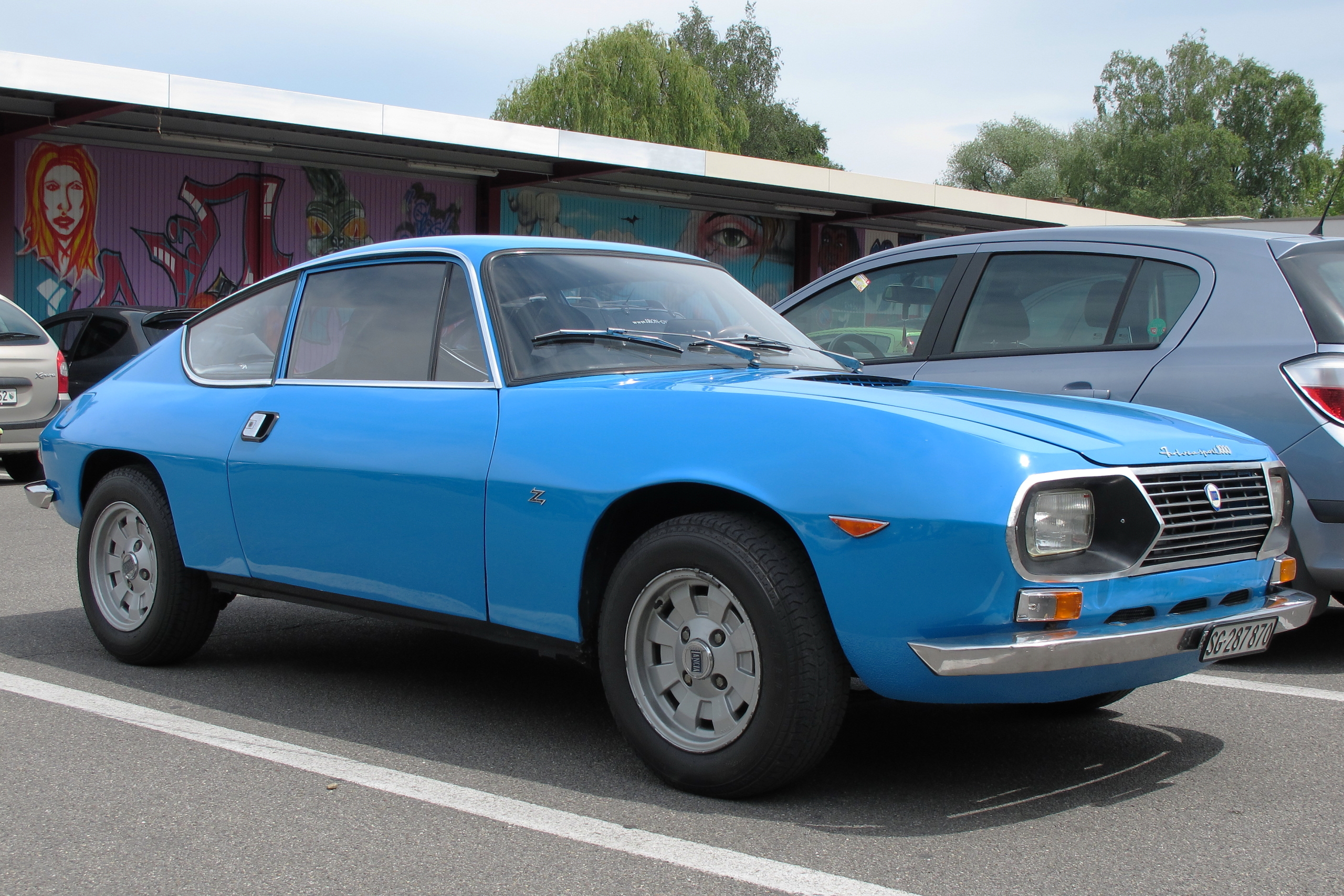
Lancia Fulvia Sport 1600 Zagato

- Sport 1.3 S (Tipo 818.650/651): 1970–1973. Same engine as Series 1 1.3 S, but five-speed transmission. Very early versions of these Series 2 cars were fitted with Series I bodyshells with a separate spare wheel-hatch, smaller rear lights and aluminium bonnet and doors. Later versions have all-steel bodyshells, no spare wheel hatch, and larger rear lights.
- Sport 1600 (Tipo 818.750/751): 1971–1972. Top of the range Sport, with 1,584 cc engine from the HF, producing 115 hp (86 kW). With a top speed of 118 mph (190 km/h), this version was the fastest production Fulvia ever produced. The 1600 was distinguished by a matte black radiator grille with chrome edges, black rubber over-riders on the bumpers, a matte black band on the engine bonnet, and new flush door handles. Some of these new fixtures—like the black grille and door handles—found their way on late 1.3 S examples.

Inside the 1600 had an oil temperature gauge, bucket seats with headrests and electric front windows as standard. Cromodora alloy wheels like those found on the 1600 HF were optional.

== Concept cars and specials ==
=== Lancia Fulvia Sport Spider (1968) ===
At the October 1968 Turin Motor Show Milanese coachbuilder Zagato showed the Fulvia Sport Spider, a 2-seater roadster based on the Fulvia Sport. The prototype reprised the lines of the Fulvia Sport, but was built on a 150 mm (5.9 in); the soft top folded underneath a flush tonneau cover. The car was finished in red, with matching leather covering the seats, dashboard and steering wheel; Plexiglas-covered headlamps were fitted. Outside, details like the black front grille and Peugeot 202-derived tail lights previewed the 1970 Series 2 Fulvia Sport.

=== Lancia Fulvia Berlinetta Competizione (1969) ===
The Fulvia Berlinetta Competizione was a concept car by Ghia first displayed at the March 1969 Geneva Motor Show. It was built with a fastback berlinetta body designed by Tom Tjaarda, using a Fulvia Rallye 1.6 HF Fanalone floorpan and mechanicals.

=== Dunja 1.6 HF (1971) ===
The Dunja 1.6 HF was a concept car with kammback coupé body based on Fulvia 1600 HF mechanicals, first shown on the Glasurit stand at the 1971 Turin Motor Show. Commissioned by Glasurit, it was designed by Aldo Sessano and built by Turinese coachbuilder Carrozzeria Coggiola on a Fulvia Coupé 1600 HF (type 818.740) chassis.

=== Lancia Fulvia Coupé Concept (2003) ===
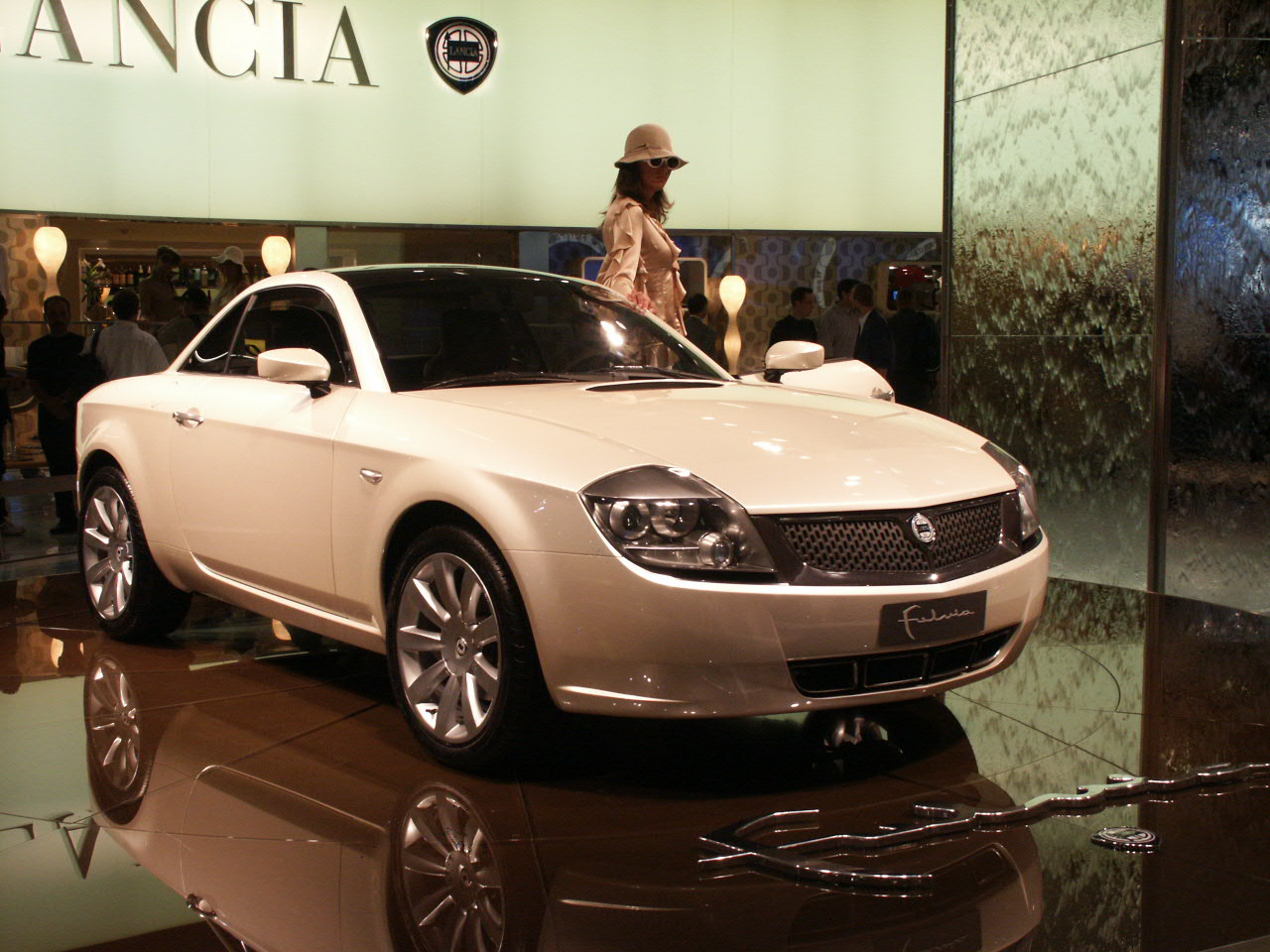
Lancia Fulvia Coupé Concept at IAA 2003

In 2003 the Fulvia name was used on a concept car, the Lancia Fulvia Coupé Concept, inspired by the original 1965 Coupé. Based on the Fiat Barchetta and designed by Centro Stile Lancia under the direction of Flavio Manzoni working with Alberto Dilillo, the car made its début at the September 2003 Internationale Automobil-Ausstellung in Frankfurt am Main. The two-seater cabin was upholstered in Testa di moro (dark brown) leather and trimmed in Tanganika wood, contrasting with the tree-layer Avorio (ivory) exterior paint colour. The prototype was front-wheel drive, weighed 990 kg (2,180 lb), and was powered by a transverse-mounted 16-valve 1.8-litre VVT, 140 PS (103 kW) inline-four engine which could propel the vehicle from 0–100 km/h (0–62 mph) in 8.6 seconds and to a top speed of 213 km/h (132 mph). The suspension uses MacPherson struts at the front and trailing arms at the rear; electronic control systems were limited to ABS. Despite the needs of a possible production model having been considered during development, the new Fulvia Coupé did not progress past the prototype stage.

== Motorsport ==
=== Rallying ===
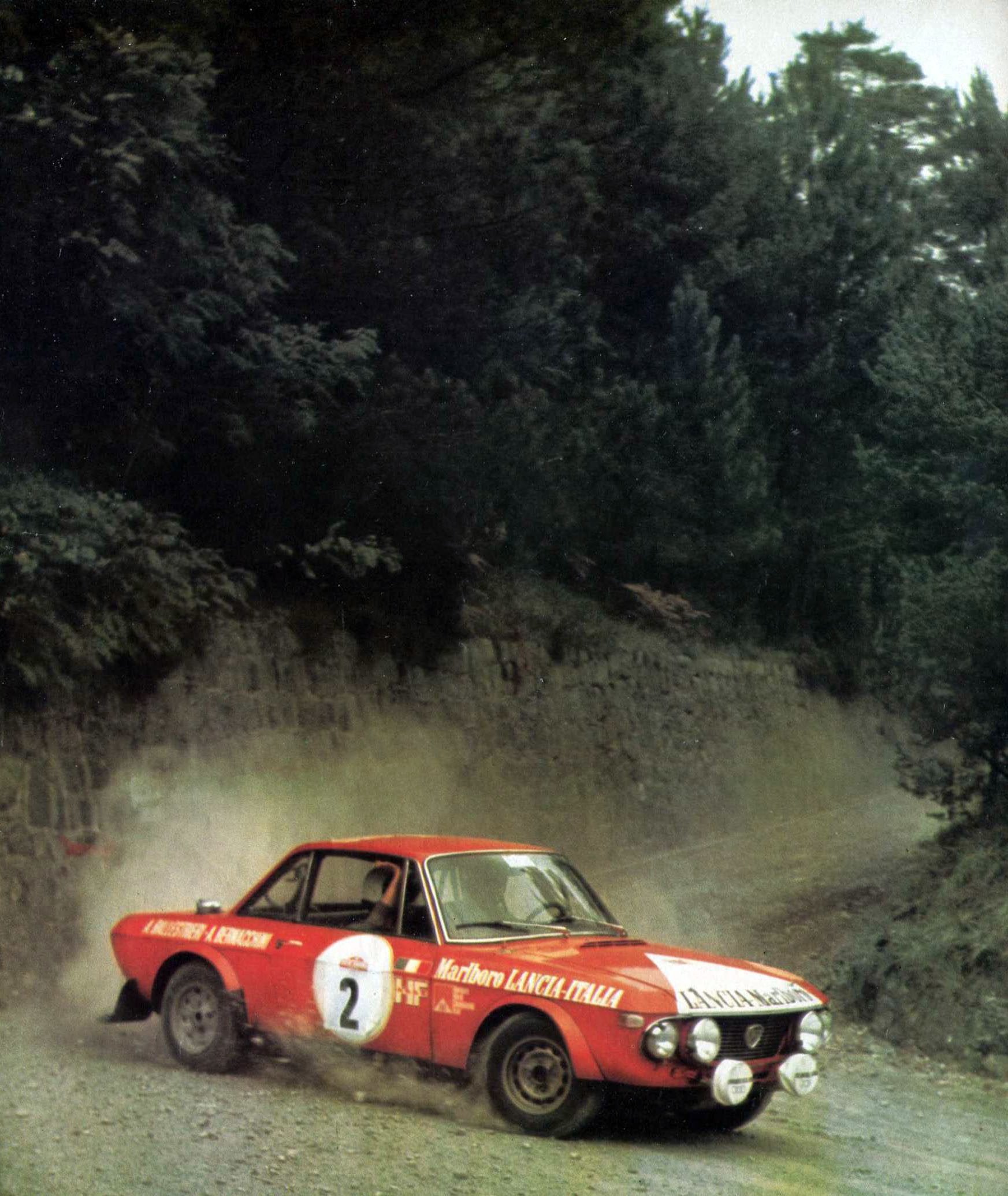
Amilcare Ballestrieri won the 1972 Rallye Sanremo on Lancia-Marlboro Fulvia Coupé HF 1.6

It was with the Fulvia that Lancia went officially back into racing after its withdrawal from Formula 1 in 1955; this time the effort was focused on rallying. In 1965 the company absorbed the HF Squadra Corse, a privateer racing team founded by Lancia enthusiasts which previously received some factory support, which became the works team under the direction of Cesare Fiorio. The same year the Fulvia Coupé made its racing debut at the Tour de Corse, placing 8th overall. Starting with the lightened and more powerful 1965 Rallye HF, special HF versions were put on sale to the general public to homologate improvements for the rally cars. In 1967 the larger displacement Rallye 1.3 HF followed. As the V4 engine had reached the limit of its development, an all-new 1.6-litre V4 engine was developed and installed on the 1967 Rallye 1.6 HF. The car raced as a prototype until August 1969, when it received FIA homologation.

With the exception of 1970, Fulvias won the Italian Rally Championship every year from 1965 to 1973. The Fulvia's rallying career reached its zenith in 1972, when Lancia won the International Championship for Manufacturers two rounds in advance. First placements at rallies valid for the Championship were three: included Sandro Munari and Mario Mannucci at the famous Monte Carlo Rally, with a 10' 50" margin over the runner up, Larrousse/Perramond on a much more powerful Porsche 911 S, Lampinen/Andreasson at the Rallye du Maroc, and Ballestrieri/Bernacchini at the Rallye Sanremo. In 1973 Lancia did not score any podium finishes valid for that year's first-ever World Rally Championship season; though at the hands of Munari, the Fulvia won its second European Rally Championship, after the 1969 victory by Harry Källström. During the 1974 season the ageing Fulvia was replaced in rallying by the Lancia Stratos HF. That year Lancia won its second World Championship, also thanks to points scored by the Fulvia in the first rallies—such as the third place Munari caught in the gruelling East African Safari Rally.

=== Endurance racing ===
The Fulvia Sport was prepared and raced by several privateers in track events. During 1968 Zagato built 27 Sport Competizione competition versions, as well as two specials which later became known as Sport Daytona. These were modified with twin, different sized round headlamps under flush Plexiglas covers, a mesh front grille, widened fenders, Plexiglas side and rear windows, quick-fill fuel cap, and a 155 PS engine. In 1969 these two cars were entered with Maglioli and Pinto as drivers at the 12 Hours of Sebring, placing 18th overall, and at the 24 Hours of Daytona, where they scored a class win in the sports prototype category and an 11th place overall.

=== Fulvia HF F&M ===
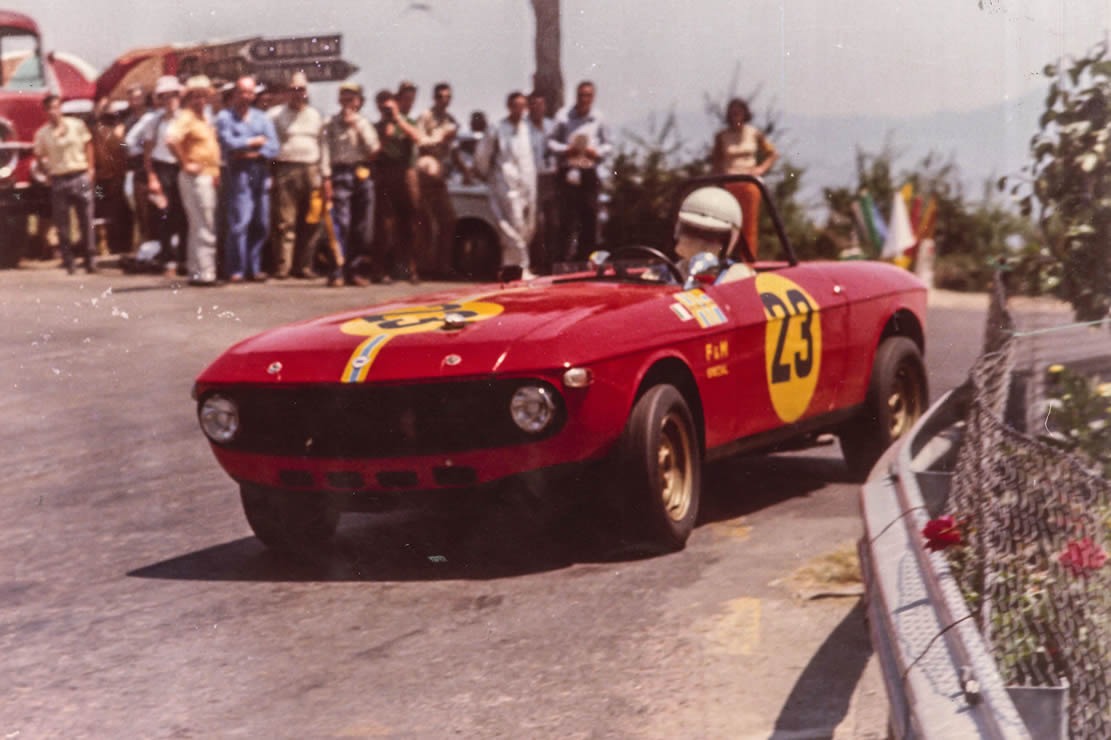
Claudio Maglioli on Lancia F&M Special, a Fulvia HF 1.6 with barchetta body, at the 1969 Mugello Grand Prix

In 1969 three competition Fulvia 1.6 HFs were transformed into racing barchettas by Claudio Maglioli. The roof and about 28 cm (11.0 in) of rear bodywork were cut away; heating, interior trim, the passenger seat, and the inner pair of headlamps were removed, while the fuel tank took place of the rear bench seat. In spite of the chassis bracing needed to preserve rigidity without the roof, the car was 200 kg (441 lb) lighter than the coupé; the suspension had to be retuned to compensate for the lighter weight, and one leaf was removed from the front spring. The car was christened Fulvia HF F&M Special, where F and M stood for the initials of Lancia team manager Cesare Fiorio and of Maglioli. The barchetta's first major race entry was the 1969 Targa Florio. Sandro Munari and Rauno Aaltonen drove one to a ninth overall placement as well as to a class victory.
