= The Couple Next Door =

Psychological thriller television series

- Genre: Psychological thriller
- Based on: Nieuwe Buren
- Written by: David Allison
- Directed by: Dries Vos
- Starring: Eleanor Tomlinson; Sam Heughan; Alfred Enoch; Hugh Dennis; Jessica De Gouw; Annabel Scholey; Sam Palladio; Aggy K. Adams; Sendhil Ramamurthy
- Music by: Hannes De Maeyer
- Country of origin: United Kingdom
- Original language: English
- No. of series: 2
- No. of episodes: 12

Production
- Executive producers: David Allison; Dries Vos; Jo McGrath; Walter Iuzzolino; Alison Kee
- Producer: Jennifer Burnet
- Production companies: Eagle Eye Drama; Happy Duck Films

Original release
- Network: Channel 4 (UK); Starz (US)
- Release: 27 November 2023 – present

The Couple Next Door is a British psychological thriller television series written by David Allison, based on the Dutch series Nieuwe Buren. Developed by Eagle Eye Drama for Channel 4 and Starz, the first series stars Eleanor Tomlinson, Sam Heughan, Alfred Enoch, Hugh Dennis and Jessica De Gouw. The programme was renewed for a second series which started airing on Channel 4 from 14 July 2025.

== Synopsis ==
Series 1: Evie and her husband Pete move next door to traffic cop Danny and yoga instructor Becka and strike up a friendship, but a night of passion between Evie and Danny leads to unforeseen consequences.

Series 2: Heart surgeon Charlotte Robert's life with her consultant anaesthetist husband Jacob is turned upside down when their mysterious new colleague Mia rents out the house next door.

== Cast ==
- Hugh Dennis as Alan Richardson
- Janine Duvitski as Gloria

=== Series 1 ===
- Eleanor Tomlinson as Evie Greenwood
- Alfred Enoch as Pete Thomas
- Sam Heughan as PC Danny Whitwell
- Jessica De Gouw as Becka Whitwell
- Kate Robbins as Jean Richardson
- Deirdre Mullins as Lena
- Joel Morris as PC Gary Hudson
- Ioanna Kimbook as Sophie Foxton
- Katie Clarkson-Hill as Rachel

=== Series 2 ===
- Annabel Scholey as Charlotte Roberts
- Sam Palladio as Jacob
- Aggy K. Adams as Mia
- Sendhil Ramamurthy as Leo
- Maimie McCoy as Gemma
- Adam James as Ben
- Tanya Moodie as Yvonne
- Jackie Clune as Annette
- Barney White as Brandon

== Episodes ==
Series	Episodes	Originally released	
Series	Episodes	First released	Last released
1	6	27 November 2023	14 December 2023
2	6	14 July 2025	23 July 2025

=== Series 1 (2023) ===
No. overall	No. in series	Title	Directed by	Written by	Original release date (Note: All 6 episodes of the first series were available on Channel 4 online on 27 November 2023.)	Viewers (millions)
1	1	"New on the Block"	Dries Vos	David Allison	27 November 2023	N/A
2	2	"Little Kids Full of Sin"	Dries Vos	David Allison	28 November 2023	N/A
3	3	"Don't Stop"	Dries Vos	David Allison	4 December 2023	N/A
4	4	"I Know It's a Secret"	Dries Vos	David Allison	5 December 2023	N/A
5	5	"Inside You"	Dries Vos	David Allison	13 December 2023	N/A
6	6	"The Cottage"	Dries Vos	David Allison	14 December 2023	N/A

=== Series 2 (2025) ===
No. overall	No. in series	Title	Directed by	Written by	Original release date (Note: All 6 episodes of the second series were available on Channel 4 online on 14 July 2025.)	Viewers (millions)
7	1	"Episode 1"	Dries Vos	David Allison	14 July 2025	N/A
8	2	"Episode 2"	Dries Vos	David Allison	15 July 2025	N/A
9	3	"Episode 3"	Dries Vos	David Allison	16 July 2025	N/A
10	4	"Episode 4"	Dries Vos	David Allison	21 July 2025	N/A
11	5	"Episode 5"	Dries Vos	David Allison	22 July 2025	N/A
12	6	"Episode 6"	Dries Vos	David Allison	23 July 2025	N/A

== Production ==
The Couple Next Door is based on the Dutch series Nieuwe Buren, with Dries Vos directing from scripts by David Allison. The six-part thriller series is produced by Jen Burnet for the London-based Eagle Eye Drama, and executive produced by Jo McGrath, Walter Iuzzolino and Alison Kee.

=== Casting ===
In March 2023, it was announced Eleanor Tomlinson, Sam Heughan, Alfred Enoch, and Jessica De Gouw had been cast in the principal roles. Tomlinson described playing Evie as a "great challenge" because "she navigates devastating trauma, which isn't helped by unresolved issues from her past." Heughan said he was "thrilled to be working with Eagle Eye Drama and director Dries Vos again ... Dries has a unique visual flair and I'm sure we're going to make something special." Hugh Dennis described his character as someone who is dealing with ageing very badly, which made him "interesting" to him.

In November 2024, it was reported that Dennis would return for season two along with characters played by Sam Palladio, Annabel Scholey, Aggy K. Adams and Sendhil Ramamurthy.

=== Filming ===
Principal photography was reported to have begun in March 2023, taking place in Leeds, England, Belgium and The Netherlands. Filming took place in Baildon in April 2023.

== Broadcast ==
The first series aired on Channel 4 in the United Kingdom on 27 November 2023, and on Starz in the United States and Canada. It was available on Lionsgate+, the international premium streaming service from Starz, in Brazil and Latin America. It was distributed further worldwide by Beta Film. The second series premiered on Channel 4 on 14 July 2025.

== Reception ==
=== Critical reception ===
The series holds a 38% "Rotten" score on review aggregator Rotten Tomatoes, based on 13 critic reviews with an average rating of 4.8/10. Anita Singh in The Daily Telegraph described it as "nonsensical, ridiculous – and very, very bingeable". Lucy Mangan in The Guardian gave the series four stars out of five and praised the script which helped the show be "sexy rather than cringeworthy". There was a less positive review from Carol Midgely in The Times who found the series "cliched".
