= Cesare Fiorio =

Italian racing driver and motorsport manager (born 1939)

Cesare Fiorio Cavaliere OMRI
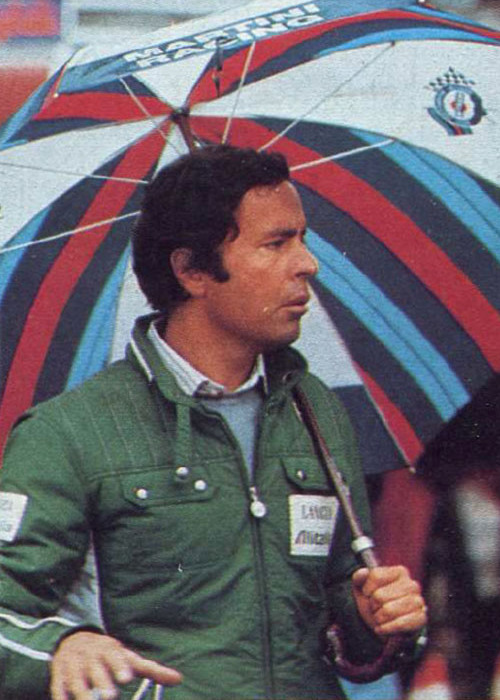
- Cesare Fiorio in 1975 as team manager of Lancia HF Squadra Corse
- Born: 26 May 1939 (age 87); Turin, Kingdom of Italy
- Occupations: racing driver, team manager, sporting director
- Known for: Founder and team manager of Lancia HF Squadra Corse; Sporting director of Scuderia Ferrari; Organizer and powerboat pilot of Destriero in the Atlantic Ocean crossing for the conquest of the Blue Riband.
- Children: Alex Fiorio; Giorgia Fiorio; Cristiano Fiorio
- Parent: Sandro Fiorio

Cesare Fiorio (born 26 May 1939) is a former Formula One sporting director of Scuderia Ferrari, Ligier and Minardi, and former racer, founder and team manager of Lancia HF Squadra Corse. He was highly appreciated both for his undoubted qualities in motorsport team management and for the results he achieved with Lancia in the World Rally Championship by both Enzo Ferrari and Gianni Agnelli. After retiring from motorsport he worked as television commentator.

== Biography ==
Cesare Fiorio was born in Turin, Italy, the son of Sandro Fiorio, former chief of the public relations department of Lancia. He began racing with Fiat, winning the Italian GT championship in 1961, and was eliminated from his only Monte Carlo Rally as a result of an accident.

He obtained a degree in political science. Soon afterwards, in February 1963, he joined the Lancia management and established a racing team which he called HF Squadra Corse, which would become one of the most successful rally teams. Lancia was initially not keen on racing, and Fiorio wanted to change this attitude: he started preparing some Lancia Fulvia, which entered many local rallies, obtaining some victories. In 1965, the team became a semi-works operation, and began hiring talented engineers to improve the Lancia Fulvia; finally, in 1967, Ove Andersson won the Spanish Rally and Sandro Munari won the Tour de Corse.

In 1969, the team was moved to the Lancia factory to become its official motorsport department; that year, the team won the European title with Harry Kallstrom, beating other manufacturers such as Alpine, Ford and Porsche. Soon afterwards, Fiat bought the Lancia company, but Fiorio was left at the head of the team. In 1972, Munari won the Monte Carlo Rally, and the team won the International Championship for Manufacturers; the following year Munari won the European Rally Championship title. Fiorio then began to push Lancia to develop the new Stratos and managed to get a supply of Dino engines from Ferrari. The car proved to be successful, and Lancia won the 1974, 1975 and 1976 World Rally Championship manufacturers' titles. At the same time, Fiorio was an active powerboat racer, winning 31 races, six European and two World titles in his classes. Lancia was also involved in sportscar racing since 1979 with the Monte Carlo model, followed by the LC1 and LC2 prototypes; Lancia won the World Championship for Makes in 1981 and the program continued until 1985.

In 1980, Lancia even discussed building a turbocharged F1 engine for the Toleman team. but nothing came of this; rallying then remained the focus with the Lancia 037 model, which won the World Championship in 1983, followed by the Delta S4. In 1984, Fiorio was appointed head of the sporting activities of Fiat, and got a place on the board of directors of Juventus FC in 1988. When Fiat bought Alfa Romeo in the same year, he was appointed head of Squadra Corse Alfa Romeo, the racing department of this marque. In 1989, he debuted as sporting director of Ferrari, with the hard task of making the team competitive again after some disappointing seasons in the mid-1980s. The team won the first race in Brazil with Nigel Mansell, and then again in Hungary and in Portugal with Gerhard Berger, but poor reliability prevented the team from competing with McLaren and Williams. In 1990 Ferrari employed the reigning World Champion Alain Prost, and almost won the title, losing it at the season finale in Japan when Prost and Senna had their second infamous collision. Fiorio and Ferrari terminated their working relationship weeks before the beginning of the 1991 season but Fiorio stayed until the 1991 Monaco Grand Prix.

In 1994, he returned to Formula One as team manager of Ligier, then owned by Flavio Briatore, but he was released the following year when Tom Walkinshaw took over the team. He was briefly involved with the Forti team in 1996 until its demise mid-season, and then returned to Ligier until the team was taken over by Prost and became Prost Grand Prix. At the end of 1998, he joined Minardi as sporting director and he remained there until the middle of 2000 when he resigned after a disagreement with team owner Gabriele Rumi. In 1994, Fiorio was appointed Cavaliere della Repubblica Italiana. From 1995 to 2017, he worked as a commentator for the Italian TV station RAI.

Fiorio owns Camarda Farm, which is located between Ostuni and Ceglie Messapica's old town centres in the province of Brindisi. The farm produces extra virgin olive oil, "primitivo" wine, corn, vegetables, cheese, fruit and eggs from the farm's own hens. In 2017, Fiorio suffered a bad cycling crash, which left him in critical condition, and he was hospitalized. He made a full recovery.

The movie Race for Glory: Audi vs. Lancia is based on his life, with actor Riccardo Scamarcio as Fiorio.
