= Final Cut (2022 film) =

2022 French film

- Release poster
- Directed by: Michel Hazanavicius
- Screenplay by: Michel Hazanavicius
- Based on: One Cut of the Dead by: Shin'ichirō Ueda; Ghost in the Box; Ryoichi Wada
- Produced by: Noëmie Devide; Brahim Chioua; Michel Hazanavicius; Vincent Maraval; Alaine de la Mata; John Penotti
- Starring: Romain Duris; Bérénice Bejo
- Cinematography: Jonathan Ricquebourg
- Edited by: Mickaël Dumontier; Michel Hazanavicius
- Music by: Alexandre Desplat
- Production companies: Getaway Films; La Classe Américaine; SK Global Entertainment; Bluelight
- Distributed by: Pan Distribution
- Release date: 17 May 2022
- Running time: 111 minutes
- Country: France
- Language: French
- Budget: €4 million
- Box office: $2.1 million

Final Cut (French: Coupez !) is a 2022 zombie comedy film written and directed by Michel Hazanavicius. It is a French remake of the 2017 Japanese film One Cut of the Dead. It stars Romain Duris and Bérénice Bejo. The film revolves around a crew remaking the film depicted in the original film. Yoshiko Takehara reprises her role as a producer.

The film was released in France on 17 May 2022, and for screening at the Cannes Film Festival as its opening film the same day.

== Cast ==
- Romain Duris as Rémi
- Bérénice Bejo as Nadia
- Grégory Gadebois as Philippe
- Finnegan Oldfield as Raphaël
- Matilda Lutz as Ava
- Sébastien Chassagne as Armel
- Raphaël Quenard as Jonathan
- Lyes Salem as Mounir
- Simone Hazanavicius as Romy
- Agnès Hurstel as Laura
- Charlie Dupont as Fredo
- Luàna Bajrami as Johanna
- Jean-Pascal Zadi as Fatih
- Raïka Hazanavicius as Manon
- Yoshiko Takehara as Madame Matsuda

== Production ==
Hazanavicius came on board the project during the first COVID-19 lockdown in 2020 after producer Vincent Maraval acquired the remake rights and approached him. Filming began on 19 April 2021 in Paris.

== Release ==
The film was scheduled to premiere at the Sundance Film Festival in January 2022, but it was pulled from the festival after in-person screenings were cancelled in response to a surge in COVID-19 cases. It was subsequently announced that it would premiere at the 2022 Cannes Film Festival. Originally scheduled on 15 June 2022, the nationwide release in France was moved up to 17 May 2022, the same day as the festival premiere. In April 2022, the Ukrainian Institute urged the festival and Hazanavicius to rename the film's French title, Z (comme Z), as the letter Z had become a militaristic symbol in support of the Russian invasion of Ukraine. Hazanavicius at first said it was too late to change the title but he made sure that the film would be referred to exclusively by the international title, Final Cut, during the festival. However, on 25 April 2022, it was announced that the French title was changed to Coupez !.

== Reception ==
On review aggregator Rotten Tomatoes, 71% of 45 critics gave the film a positive review, with an average rating of 5.8/10. The website's critics consensus reads, "Although it'll be more satisfying to viewers who haven't already seen the original, Final Cut offers playfully entertaining meta commentary on the art of the remake." On Metacritic, the film has a weighted average score of 51 out of 100 based on 14 critics, indicating "mixed or average reviews".

Peter Bradshaw of The Guardian called the film "an entertaining piece of work - and a genuine oddity, ostensibly about cinema, but more about the live theatre experience. It may yet have found a way to breathe new life into the zombie genre itself." Conversely, Owen Gleiberman of Variety called it "the first Hazanavicius movie where the filmmaker seems barely in control of what he’s doing. It’s a messy and annoying one-joke movie that repeats the joke over and over again."
