= Greek Salad (TV series) =

French comedy drama television series

- French poster
- French: Salade grecque
- Genre: Comedy drama
- Created by: Cédric Klapisch
- Written by: Lola Doillon; Thomas Colineau; Charlotte de Givry; Agnès Hurstel; Paul Madillo; Eugène Riousse
- Directed by: Cédric Klapisch; Lola Doillon; Antoine Garceau
- Starring: Aliocha Schneider; Megan Northam; Aggy K. Adams; Dimitris Kitsos; Fotinì Peluso; Reham Alkassar; Amir Baylly; Davide Iachini; Anna Kamenikova
- Country of origin: France
- Original language: French
- No. of seasons: 1
- No. of episodes: 8

Production
- Production locations: Athens, Greece
- Running time: 47–55 minutes
- Production company: Ce Qui Me Meut

Original release
- Network: Amazon Prime Video
- Release: 17 March 2023

Greek Salad (French: Salade grecque) is a French comedy drama television series created by Cédric Klapisch. The first two episodes premiered on 17 March 2023 at the Series Mania festival in Lille, while the entire first season was released on Amazon Prime Video the following month.

The series is a sequel to Klapisch's Spanish Apartment trilogy, and follows Tom and Mia, the children of Xavier and Wendy.

== Premise ==
Siblings Tom and Mia, the children of Xavier and Wendy from L'Auberge Espagnole, move to Athens after inheriting an apartment from their recently deceased grandfather. Tom intends to sell the apartment and use the proceeds to fund a startup company, but the anti-capitalist Mia has other plans in mind.

== Cast and characters ==
- Aliocha Schneider as Tom
- Megan Northam as Mia
- Aggy K. Adams as Lily
- Dimitris Kitsos as Kristos
- Fotinì Peluso as Giulia
- Reham Alkassar as Reem
- Amir Baylly as Noam
- Davide Iachini as Pippo
- Anna Kamenikova as Barbora
- Josip Ledina as Zoran
- Félix Vannoorenberghe as Paco
- Anastasis Laoulakos as Yannis
- Manolis Mavromatakis as Valsamidis
- Romain Duris as Xavier
- Kelly Reilly as Wendy
- Cécile de France as Isabelle
- Agnès Hurstel as Juliette
- Barnaby Metschurat as Tobias

== Episodes ==
No.	Title	Duration	Original release date
1	"Episode #1.1"	51 min	14 April 2023
2	"Episode #1.2"	50 min	14 April 2023
3	"Episode #1.3"	53 min	14 April 2023
4	"Episode #1.4"	47 min	14 April 2023
5	"Episode #1.5"	50 min	14 April 2023
6	"Episode #1.6"	48 min	14 April 2023
7	"Episode #1.7"	52 min	14 April 2023
8	"Episode #1.8"	55 min	14 April 2023

== Production ==
In March 2021, Amazon Prime Video France announced the development of Greek Salad, which was to be produced by Ce Qui Me Meut exclusively for Prime Video.

Filming took place in Athens over four months beginning in December 2022.

== Awards and nominations ==
Year	Award	Category	Nominee	Result	Ref.
2023	ACS Awards	Best 40' Series	Greek Salad	Nominated	
