= Meanwhile on Earth =

2024 French film

- Theatrical film poster
- French: Pendant ce temps sur terre
- Directed by: Jérémy Clapin
- Written by: Jérémy Clapin
- Produced by: Marc du Pontavice
- Starring: Megan Northam; Catherine Salée; Sam Louwyck
- Cinematography: Robrecht Heyvaert
- Edited by: Jean Christophe Bouzy
- Music by: Dan Levy
- Production company: One World Films
- Distributed by: Diaphana Distribution
- Release dates: 16 February 2024 (Berlinale); 1 May 2024 (France)
- Running time: 87 minutes
- Country: France
- Language: French
- Box office: $127,021

Meanwhile on Earth (French: Pendant ce temps sur terre) is a 2024 French science fiction drama film directed by Jérémy Clapin. The film starring Megan Northam as Elsa, revolves around an 'absent' hero, Franck, who disappeared during a space mission three years ago. His sister Elsa who was very close to him, finds it difficult to continue her life, till one day she is contacted by an alien life form.

It was selected in the Panorama section at the 74th Berlin International Film Festival and was screened on 16 February 2024.

== Cast ==
- Megan Northam as Elsa
- Catherine Salée as Annick
- Sam Louwyck as Daniel
- Roman Williams as Vincent
- Sofia Lesaffre as Audrey
- Nicolas Avinée as Augustin
- Yoann Thibaut Mathias as Jordan
- Arcadi Radeff as Luc
- Yoan Germain Le mat as Franck
- Sabine Timoteo as Sidonie
- Dimitri Doré

== Production ==
Meanwhile on Earth, the second feature film and first fiction film of Jérémy Clapin, is produced by Marc du Pontavice for One World Films.

Filming began from 30 August 2022 and was finished around October 2022 in communes of Puy de Dôme viz.: Clermont-Ferrand and its surrounds, Saint-Éloy-les-Mines, Royat, the forest in Orcines, the crater lake in Gour de Tazenat, and in Paris and Belgium.

== Release ==
Meanwhile on Earth had its world premiere in February 2024, as part of the 74th Berlin International Film Festival, in Panorama.

It was released theatrically on 1 May 2024 in France by Diaphana Distribution, after it competed in the International Competition at 39th Mons International Film Festival held from 8 to 16 March 2024.

The film had its North American premiere at the 28th Fantasia International Film Festival on July 22, 2024.

== Reception ==
On the review aggregator Rotten Tomatoes website, the film has an approval rating of 88% based on 8 reviews, with an average rating of 7.3/10. Metacritic, which uses a weighted average, assigned the film a score of 63 out of 100, based on 4 critics, indicating "generally favorable" reviews.

Jordan Mintzer reviewing for The Hollywood Reporter termed the film as "Visually impressive, if not fully grounded". Concluding, Mintzer praised Dan Levy for his "dreamy score" and Clapin's visual talents and wrote, Meanwhile on Earth takes us beyond our desolate everyday lives to a place we can indeed dream of — and also witness on screen."

Damon Wise opined that the writer-director Jérémy Clapin improvised Jean Cocteau’s 1950 classic Orphée and giving it a "very modern makeover", explores concept of grief with Meanwhile on Earth "in a strange, poetic, and endearingly surreal meditation on the counter-intuitive ways in which we react when confronted with loss." Wise praised Megan Northam, the lead star, writing, "Northam holds it all together with a mixture of surface strength and inner vulnerability like a brass-knuckle Léa Seydoux". In his review at Berlinale for Deadline he said, "Whether any part of this story is objectively “real” or not: planet earth is blue, and there's nothing we can do."

Fabien Lemercier reviewing the film at Berlinale for Cineuropa wrote, "The film is an astonishing and abundant patchwork concealing countless themes beneath its stressfully entertaining exterior, which is carved up by three brilliantly executed animated sequences, enveloped in Dan Levy ’s formidable music." Lemercier concluded the review opining, "No doubt Jérémy Clapin will refine many elements even further during his next awaited voyage into the galaxy of fiction."

Writing for RogerEbert.com, Robert Daniels was more critical of the film, lamenting that the film is a "frustrating watch precisely because the elements are there, but they’ve been poorly configured, restricted from unleashing the freakishly bloody onslaught being teased."

== Accolades ==
Award	Date	Category	Recipient	Result	Ref.
Berlin International Film Festival	25 February 2024	Panorama Audience Award for Best Feature Film	Jérémy Clapin	Nominated	
