= Race for Glory: Audi vs. Lancia =

2024 Italian sports film

- Italian theatrical release poster
- Directed by: Stefano Mordini
- Screenplay by: Riccardo Scamarcio; Filippo Bologna; Stefano Mordini
- Produced by: Riccardo Scamarcio; Jeremy Thomas
- Starring: Riccardo Scamarcio; Volker Bruch; Katie Clarkson-Hill; Esther Garrel; Giorgio Montanini; Gianmaria Martini; Haley Bennett; Daniel Brühl
- Cinematography: Gigi Martinucci
- Edited by: Davide Minotti; Massimo Fiocchi
- Production companies: Recorded Picture Company; Lebowski; HanWay Films; Metropolitan Films
- Distributed by: 01 Distribution (Italy); Signature Entertainment (United Kingdom, Ireland, Australia and New Zealand)
- Release date: 5 January 2024
- Running time: 108 minutes
- Countries: Italy; United Kingdom
- Languages: English, German, Italian

Race for Glory: Audi vs. Lancia is a 2024 motor racing film co-produced between Italy and Britain, directed by Stefano Mordini from the script written by Filippo Bologna, Mordini, and Riccardo Scamarcio, produced by Scarmarcio and Jeremy Thomas for Recorded Picture Company, as well as Lebowski, HanWay Films and Metropolitan Films; and with Daniel Brühl and Scamarcio in starring roles.

Based on true events, the film depicts the rivalry between Roland Gumpert's team driving the Audi Quattro and the team of Cesare Fiorio in the Lancia 037 rally car at the 1983 World Rally Championship. The film was simultaneously released in cinemas and on video on demand on 5 January 2024.

== Synopsis ==
During the 1983 World Rally Championship, intense rivalry develops between the team Audi Sport GmbH led by Roland Gumpert, with their AWD Audi Quattro, and the team Lancia Abarth under the leadership of Cesare Fiorio with their two-wheel drive Lancia Rally 037. The German team is the favourite to win.

With only 103 models of Lancia Rally 037 models built, team Lancia subverts the required homologation minimum of 200 by presenting the same vehicles twice but on two different locations, Fiorio treating the two inspectors at lunch while the vehicles are moved.

Lancia also hires the renowned German rally driver Walter Röhrl to drive in one half of the 1983 season races, including Monte Carlo, Portugal, Greece, and finally, San Remo.

== Cast ==
- Daniel Brühl as Roland Gumpert
- Riccardo Scamarcio as Cesare Fiorio
- Volker Bruch as Walter Röhrl
- Katie Clarkson-Hill as Jane McCoy, dietitian and daughter of Larry McCoy
- Esther Garrel as Michèle Mouton
- Rebecca Busi as Fabrizia Pons
- Gianmaria Martini as Hannu Mikkola
- Axel Gallois as Dupont, a race inspector
- Giorgio Montanini as Ennio, mechanic for Lancia
- Haley Bennett as The Journalist
- Andrea Crugnola (3-time rally champion of Italy) as Stig Blomqvist

== Production ==
The film, originally entitled 2 Win, is produced by Jeremy Thomas together with Riccardo Scamarcio. Lebowski is producing the film with Recorded Picture Company and Metropolitan Films co-producing. RAI is the Italian distributor. HanWay Films is handling worldwide sales. The film was taken to buyers on the Croisette at the Cannes Film Festival. In December 2023, the film title was changed to Race for Glory: Audi vs. Lancia.

=== Filming ===
Filming locations include Italy and Greece, including some of the places where the events depicted took place, such as the Lancia office and the Circuito di Balocco. Principal photography started in Turin on 16 May 2022.

The film was marked as in post-production by 6 August 2022.

== Release ==
The film was picked up by Grindstone Entertainment Group and given a simultaneous release theatrically and on video on demand by Lionsgate on 5 January 2024.

== Reception ==
A review on RogerEbert.com wrote, "The movie probably needed to be a lot artier and more challenging or a lot more conventional to stand out. As is, it never rises above the level of a good try." while The Guardian found, "There's an admirable sense of tastefulness to the approach here of Italian director Stefano Mordini, working from a script he wrote with Filippo Bologna and Riccardo Scamarcio. Michael Mann's recent film Ferrari had the good sense to print the legend, giving thrill-seekers what they want in terms of interpersonal drama and explosive racing set-pieces. Mordini's film, though, is a handsomely made, stylish-looking piece of cinema, with some beautifully lensed racing scenes and great 1980s wardrobes – but when you sit down to watch something called Race for Glory you do want your heart to beat faster."

Variety criticised the film's "imbalance" and the excessive focus on the character of Fiorio. A review in the Italian edition of Esquire stated, "this is the story of an Italian team that beats a foreign team and partisanship is part of the package, if anything, it is when Italian pride passes through the more stereotypical traits such as cunning or food, which gives the impression of having remained at the most basic level."

== See also ==
- Ford v Ferrari (2019)
- Rush (2013)
