= The Wives (TV series) =

British television series

- Genre: Mystery; Drama
- Created by: Helen Black
- Written by: Helen Black; Ciara Conway; Jamie Jackson
- Directed by: Claire Tailyour; Paulette Randall
- Starring: Angela Griffin; Jo Joyner; Tamzin Outhwaite
- Country of origin: United Kingdom
- Original language: English
- No. of series: 1
- No. of episodes: 6

Production
- Executive producers: Jess Connell; Alison Jackson
- Producer: Margot Gavan Duffy
- Production company: Gaumont

Original release
- Network: Channel 5
- Release: 16 September – 25 September 2024

The Wives is a 2024 British mystery drama thriller television drama series for Channel 5, created by Helen Black and starring Jo Joyner, Tamzin Outhwaite and Angela Griffin. The series was broadcast on Channel 5 in the UK from 16 September 2024.

== Premise ==
Three British sisters-in-law routinely holiday together with their families in Malta. However, on their latest trip away they find themselves confronting the disappearance of one of their own - Annabelle. She is believed to be dead, and they are forced to deal with her supposedly grieving partner introducing his 'new' younger girlfriend to the group. The sisters-in-law become suspicious, more so when one of them reveals she knew that Annabelle was planning on leaving her wealthy husband and planned on telling him the day she disappeared.

== Cast ==
- Jo Joyner as Beth Morgan
- Tamzin Outhwaite as Sylvia Morgan
- Angela Griffin as Natasha Morgan
- Christine Bottomley as Annabelle Morgan
- Jamie Bamber as Charlie Morgan
- Katie Clarkson-Hill as Jade
- Ben Willbond as Frankie Morgan
- Jonathan Forbes as Sean Morgan
- Catriona Chandler as Sky Morgan
- Louis Boyer as Luca Vella
- Ajay Chhabra as Vinay Taneja

== Production ==
The six-part series is produced by Gaumont and was announced for Channel 5 in November 2023. The series was written and created by Helen Black, with episodes by Ciara Conway and Jamie Jackson. The series is directed by Claire Tailyour and Paulette Randall. Produced by Margot Gavan Duffy, executive producers for Gaumont are Jess Connell and Alison Jackson.

Filming took place in Malta with a lead cast led by Angela Griffin, Tamzin Outhwaite and Jo Joyner and also includes Jamie Bamber and Katie Clarkson-Hill.

== Broadcast ==
The series was broadcast on Channel 5 in the UK on 16 September 2024.

== Episodes ==
| No. | Title | Directed by | Written by | Original release date | U.K. viewers (millions) |
|---|---|---|---|---|---|
| 1 | "1.1" | Claire Tailyour | Helen Black | 16 September 2024 | N/A |
| 2 | "1.2" | Claire Tailyour | Helen Black | 17 September 2024 | N/A |
| 3 | "1.3" | Claire Tailyour | Ciara Conway | 18 September 2024 | N/A |
| 4 | "1.4" | Paulette Randall | Jamie Jackson | 23 September 2024 | N/A |
| 5 | "1.5" | Paulette Randall | Helen Black | 24 September 2024 | N/A |
| 6 | "1.6" | Paulette Randall | Helen Black | 25 September 2024 | N/A |

== Reception ==
Emily Watkins for the i (newspaper) awarded the show two stars, criticising what she labelled as cartoonish characters and a cliched script.
