= Graciane Finzi =

French composer (born 1945)

Graciane Finzi (born 10 July 1945) is a Morocco-born French composer.

== Life ==
Graciane Finzi was born in Casablanca, Morocco, and studied music at the Casablanca Conservatory, then managed by Georges Friboulet, where her parents were teachers. She entered the Paris Conservatory at age ten, where she studied piano with Joseph Benvenuti and developed an interest in composition.

After completing her studies, she worked as a composer. She served as music director of the Festival de la Défense from 1975 to 1979, and began teaching at the Paris Conservatory in 1979. She served as vice-president of the International Society for Contemporary Music (SIMC) and of Société Nationale and as official representative to the Association Française d’Action Artistique (AFAA). She was composer-in-residence with the Lille National Orchestra from 2001 to 2003.

== Honours and awards ==
- SACEM Grand Prix de la Promotion Symphonique
- Georges Enesco Prize
- SACEM Grand Prix
- SACD Prize for her opera "Pauvre Assassin", (premiered in Strasbourg, at Opéra du Rhin)

== Works ==
Finzi's compositions often mix difference genres and folk styles. She composes for music theater, voice, solo instruments, chamber ensemble and orchestra, but is noted for opera. Selected works include:

- Il était tant de fois (1979)
- Les Chiens qui rêvent dans la nuit, Trio for flute, viola and harp (1982)
- Soleil vert for orchestra (1983)
- Pauvre assassin (1990)
- Ainsi la Vie for viola solo (1991)
- Espressivo for harpsichord and fixed sounds (1996)
- Le Dernier jour de Socrate (1997) opera with Jean-Claude Carrière
- La Tombée du jour (1998) text by Michel Schneider
- Brume de sable (1999)
- Ode à Dalí (2000) text by Federico García Lorca
- Osmose for viola and guitar (2001)
- Errance dans la nuit (2002)
- Là-bas, peut-être, opera (2003)
- Quand un enfant voyage, opera (2004)
- Impression Tango for violin (or viola, or cello) and accordion (or piano) (2005)
- Le Clavier Fantastique, opera
- Concerto for amplified harpsichord and orchestra with cymbalum (2007)
- Kaddish (2009)
- Concerto for viola and orchestra
- Nomade
- Alma Mareira
