= Walter Iuzzolino =

Italian television producer (born 1968)

- Born: 1968 (age 57–58); Genoa, Italy
- Occupation: Television producer
- Known for: Walter Presents

Walter Iuzzolino (born 1968) is an Italian television producer. He is known for producing UK television shows including The Couple Next Door, Professor T, Patience and Bookish. He founded Eagle Eye Drama with fellow producer Jo McGrath.

== Biography ==
Iuzzolino was born in Genoa, Italy, in 1968. He has reportedly had a lifelong interest in film and television drama. He is responsible for selecting the content for the eponymous Walter Presents range of foreign-language TV drama series on the UK's Channel 4 free streaming service. Iuzzolino has also produced scripted television drama, through Eagle Eye Media, with an emphasis on English-language remakes of popular European dramas. These include Professor T., Before We Die, Suspect and The Couple Next Door. In 2022, the ITV period drama Hotel Portofino, about an aristocratic British family moving to a resort town in the Italian Riviera to run a hotel in the 1920s, was Eagle Eye's first original drama commission.
