= Megan Northam =

French actress

- Born: Nantes, France
- Occupation: Actress
- Years active: 2012–present
- Notable work: Rabia

Megan Northam is a French actress. She was nominated for the 2025 César Award for Best Female Revelation for her role in the film Rabia (2024).

== Early life ==
She was born and raised in Nantes, the daughter of an English scenographer at the Nantes Opera. Her mother is French and works as a graphic designer. At the age of 6, she started playing the cello. She spent a year studying performing arts at the University of Rennes, before dropping out to move to Paris to perform music and take drama classes.

== Career ==
She made her screen debut in the short film Nous ne serons plus jamais seul by Yann Gonzalez. Her first feature film was Constance Meyer's film Robuste in 2021.

She played Judith in 2022 French film The Passengers of the Night, ten daughter of Elizabeth (Charlotte Gainsbourg). She could be seen as Mia in 2023 French comedy drama series Greek Salad, the daughter of Xavier (Romain Duris).

She played the lead role of Elsa in 2024 science-fiction film Meanwhile on Earth. She appeared in French-Belgian television series La rebelle: Les aventures de la jeune George Sand. In 2024, she also appeared in Lucie Prost's debut feature film Fario.

She was nominated for the 2025 César Award for Best Female Revelation for her role in the film Rabia.

She has an upcoming role in Harris Dickinson's debut feature film Urchin. She also has a role in Jean-Xavier de Lestrade’s series about the Bataclan attacks, Des Vivants.

== Partial filmography ==
Year	Title	Role	Notes
2012	Nous ne serons plus jamais seul		Short film
2022	The Passengers of the Night	Judith	
2023	Greek Salad	Mia	8 episodes
2024	Meanwhile on Earth	Elsa	
2024	Fario	Camille	
2024	Rabia	Jessica/Rabia	
2025	La rebelle: Les aventures de la jeune George Sand	Pauline de Beaumont	
2025	Urchin	Andrea	
2026	Les Misérables	Cosette	Adaptation of Les Misérables by Victor Hugo
