= Emma Fielding =

English actress (born 1970)

- Born: 7 October 1970 (age 56); Catterick, North Riding of Yorkshire, England, UK
- Education: Royal Conservatoire of Scotland
- Occupation: Actress

Emma Georgina Annalies Fielding (born 7 October 1970) is an English actress.

== Early life and education ==
The daughter of a British Army officer, Fielding spent some of her childhood in Nigeria, Malaysia, Saudi Arabia, Northern Ireland and other places, also living above a betting shop in Malvern. She went to school at Berkhamsted Collegiate boarding school and worked as an usherette at the Apollo Theatre Oxford as a teenager. She studied law at Cambridge University, abandoning her studies after two terms, and worked at a kibbutz in Israel before embarking on the study of acting at the Royal Scottish Academy of Music and Drama.

== Career ==
After graduation Fielding worked for the Royal National Theatre and the Royal Shakespeare Company, coming to the attention of critics in 1993's National Theatre production of Tom Stoppard's Arcadia, in which she created the role of Thomasina, and then in John Ford's The Broken Heart for which she won the Dame Peggy Ashcroft Award for Best Actress. Also in 1993, she was Agnes in The School for Wives at the Almeida Theatre, for which she won the Ian Charleson Award. She made her Broadway theatre debut in 2003 in Noël Coward's Private Lives. She has also appeared in numerous radio plays for the BBC, including playing Esme in Tom Stoppard's Rock 'n' Roll, a role she also played in the West End. More recently, she appeared in the BBC TV mini-series Cranford.

In 2009, she appeared as Daisy alongside Timothy West in the BBC Radio 4 adaptation of John Mortimer's Rumpole and the Penge Bungalow Murders. She has also appeared in the crime drama Death in Paradise playing the part of Astrid Knight. (Season 1, Episode 4). In 2014, she appeared in another crime drama DCI Banks (Series 3, Episodes 17 & 18).

In 2018, Fielding appeared in EastEnders as Ted Murray's (Christopher Timothy) daughter.

In November 2018, she provided the voice for the alien Kisar in the Doctor Who episode "Demons of the Punjab".

== Awards and nominations ==
- In 1994, Fielding won the Ian Charleson Award for her Agnes in The School for Wives at the Almeida Theatre in 1993.
- Fielding was nominated for a 1999 Laurence Olivier Award for Best Supporting Performance for her role in The School for Scandal in the 1998 season.
- She was nominated for a 2002 Laurence Olivier Theatre Award for Best Actress in a Supporting Role of 2001 for her performance in Private Lives at the Albery Theatre, London. She won a Theatre World Award for outstanding Broadway debut for the same role when the show was produced on Broadway in 2002.
- She was awarded the 1993 Critics' Circle Theatre Award for Most Promising Newcomer for her performances in Arcadia and The School for Wives.

== Filmography ==
=== Film ===
Year	Film	Role	Notes
1998	The Scarlet Tunic	Frances Groves	
2000	Pandaemonium	Mary Wordsworth	
2000	Exposure	Bridget, TV director	Short film
2001	The Discovery of Heaven	Helga	
2002	Shooters	Detective Inspector Sarah Pryce	
2003	Unscrew	Judy	Short film
2003	The Ancient Forests	Mother	Short film
2008	The Other Man	Gail	
2011	The Great Ghost Rescue	Mabel	
2012	Fast Girls	Ellie Temple	
2012	Twenty8k	Jean Weaver	
2015	The Briny	Ruth	Short film
2018	A Woman of No Importance	Mrs. Allonby	

=== Television ===
Year	Film	Role	Notes
1992	Tell Tale Hearts	Becky Wilson	3 episodes
1992	Screenplay	Mary Shelley	Episode: "Dread Poets' Society"
1993	Agatha Christie's Poirot	Ruth Chevenix	Episode: "Dead Man's Mirror"
1993	Performance	Joan Clareville	Episode: "The Maitlands"
1996	Kavanagh QC	Caroline Wicks	Episode: "Job Satisfaction"
1997	Drovers' Gold	Elizabeth Watkins	Mini-series (5 episodes)
1997	A Dance to the Music of Time	Isobel	Mini-series (2 episodes: "The Thirties" and "The War")
1998	A Respectable Trade	Frances Scott Cole	Mini-series (2 episodes)
1998	The Mrs. Bradley Mysteries	Eleanor Bing	Episode: "Speedy Death"
1998	The Life of Confucius	Mother	
1999	Horizon	Mrs. Lack	Episode: "Wings of Angels"
1999, 2001	Big Bad World	Beatrice Dempsey	7 episodes
2000	Other People's Children	Josie	Episode: "#1.2"
2001	The Inspector Lynley Mysteries	Helen Clyde	Episode: "A Great Deliverance"
2001	The Green-Eyed Monster	Marni McGuire	Television film
2002	The Gist	Harriet Gould	Television film
2002	Nova	Emily Shackleton (voice)	Episode: "Shackleton's Voyage of Endurance"
2002	Birthday Girl	Tracey Jones	Television film
2003	My Uncle Silas	Hermione	Episode: "A Funny Thing"
2004	Waking the Dead	Dr. Greta Simpson	2 episodes: "The Hardest Word: Parts 1 & 2"
2005	The Government Inspector	Susan Watts	Television film
2005	Beneath the Skin	Jennifer Hintlesham	Television film
2005	The Ghost Squad	D/Supt. Carole McKay	8 episodes
2007	Fallen Angel	Janet Byfield	Mini-series (1 episode: "The Office of the Dead")
2007, 2009	Cranford	Miss Galindo	8 episodes
2010	Midsomer Murders	Faith Kent	Episode: "The Silent Land"
2011	Kidnap and Ransom	Naomi Shaffer	3 episodes
2011	The Suspicions of Mr Whicher	Mary Kent	Episode: "The Murder at Road Hill House"
2011	Death in Paradise	Astrid Knight	Episode: "Missing a Body?"
2014	Father Brown	Ada Gerard	Episode: "The Prize of Colonel Gerard"
2014	DCI Banks	Liz Forbes	2 episodes: "Piece of My Heart: Parts 1 & 2"
2014	Inspector George Gently	Agnes Webb	Episode: "Blue for Bluebird"
2014	Silk	Elizabeth Buchan	Episode: "The Real McCoy: Part 2"
2014	New Tricks	Caroline Tate	Episode "Breadcrumbs"
2014	The Game	Valerie Parkwood	Mini-series (1 episode)
2015	Foyle's War	Joyce Corrigan	Episode: "Elise"
2015	Arthur & George	Charlotte Edalji	Mini-series (3 episodes)
2015	This Is England '90	Roma	Mini-series (1 episode: "Summer")
2015	Capital	Strauss	Mini-series (1 episode)
2016	Close to the Enemy	Miss Clarkson	Mini-series (6 episodes)
2016	Dark Angel	Helen Robinson	Mini-series (2 episodes)
2018	Silent Witness	Sally Vaughan	2 episodes: "Moment of Surrender: Parts 1 & 2"
2018	EastEnders	Judith Thompson	3 episodes
2018	Unforgotten	Amy Hollis	6 episodes
2018	Doctor Who	Kisar (voice)	Episode: "Demons of the Punjab"
2018‒2019	Les Misérables	Nicolette	Mini-series (6 episodes)
2019	Years and Years	Jane Bordolino	Mini-series (1 episode)
2020‒	Van der Valk	Julia Dahlman	12 episodes
2023	Sanditon	Lady Montrose	6 episodes
2024	Beyond Paradise	Marion Goddard	Episode: "#2.4"
2024	Sister Boniface Mysteries	Venetia Thistleton	Episode: "A Fragrant Scandal"
2024	Strike	Katya Upcott	4 episodes: "The Ink Black Heart: Parts 1‒4"

=== Video games ===
Year	Film	Role	Notes
2007	Dragon Quest Swords: The Masked Queen and the Tower of Mirrors	Queen Curtana (English version, voice)	
2009	Dragon Age: Origins	The Lady of the Forest / Mother Perpetua / Traveller (voice)	
2013	Star Wars: The Old Republic - Rise of the Hutt Cartel	Katha Niar (voice)	
2015	Assassin's Creed: Syndicate - Jack the Ripper	Blighters / London Civilian (voice)	
2017	Warhammer 40,000: Dawn of War III	Jain Zar (voice)	
2018	Call of Cthulhu	Additional voices	
2022	Steelrising	Marie-Antoinette (voice) / Additional Voices	
2023	The Invincible	Marit (voice)	
2023	Bayonetta Origins: Cereza and the Lost Demon	Morgana (voice)	

=== Audiobooks ===
- His Dark Materials as Mrs Coulter
- Vanity Fair as Rebecca Sharp Crawley
- The Haunting of Hill House as The Narrator. (By Shirley Jackson. Audiobook, BBC).
- Israbel as Israbel. (By Tanith Lee. Dramatisation, [A Short History of Vampires Episode 3 of 4], BBC).
- Funny Girl as The Narrator. (By Nick Hornby, 2014, Penguin Audio).

She has narrated the following for Naxos Audiobooks:

- Hamlet
- Hedda Gabler
- Jane Eyre
- Lady Windermere's Fan
- Othello
- Rebecca
- The Turn of the Screw
- Fanny Hill

for Random House Audio:

- I Don't Know How She Does It
- Longbourn
