= John Hollingworth (actor) =

British actor (born 1981)

- Born: 21 August 1981 (age 45); Keighley, England
- Occupation: Actor
- Years active: 2008-present
- Notable work: Poldark; Doc Martin; Wuthering Heights; Top Coppers; Arthur & George; Da Vinci's Demons; Dark Angel; The Hour; Napoleon

John Hollingworth (born 21 August 1981) is an English actor from Keighley, Bradford, West Yorkshire.

== Early life and education ==
Hollingworth was raised in Oxenhope, Keighley, by his mother Jane. He studied at Bradford Grammar School, and Trinity College, Dublin. While at Bradford Grammar School he played rugby for Yorkshire Schoolboys, and played in the same team as future England and British and Irish Lions international Charlie Hodgson, before injury forced Hollingworth to hang up his boots and become an actor. He trained as an actor at RADA.

== Stage roles ==
Hollingworth won early roles in National Youth Theatre productions of The Life and Adventures of Nicholas Nickleby, The Threepenny Opera and The Master and Margarita opposite Matt Smith.

He has worked extensively on stage, which include leading roles in Making Noise Quietly, Our Country's Good, An Intervention and Earthquakes in London. In 2011, he starred opposite Maxine Peake in The Deep Blue Sea at the West Yorkshire Playhouse.

Some of his other theatre credits include Women, Power and Politics at the Tricycle theatre, For King and Country at the Theatre Royal, Plymouth, The Playboy of the Western World at the Nuffield Theatre (Southampton), Ignition 2 at the Royal Court Upstairs, The Power of Yes at the National Theatre, Design for Living at the Old Vic and Observe the Sons of Ulster Marching Towards the Somme at the Hampstead Theatre.

His portrayal of Nick Clegg at the Tricycle Theatre caught the attention of fellow Keighley born Alastair Campbell. In 2017 he appeared in Alan Ayckbourn’s trilogy of plays The Norman Conquests at Chichester Festival Theatre.

Hollingworth was Offie-nominated for his role in The Sugar Syndrome at the Orange Tree Theatre in 2020. He performed in Trouble In Mind at The National Theatre in 2021/2022. He played Antony in Shakespeare’s Antony and Cleopatra at The Globe Theatre in 2024. The production won an award at the UK Theatre Awards in November 2024. He went on to play the lead in the new Richard Bean play Reykjavik, returning to the Hampstead Theatre in November 2024.

== Radio roles ==
Hollingworth was runner-up in the BBC SoundStart Carleton Hobbs Bursary Award in 2008.

He appeared with Damian Lewis in series four and five of the BBC Radio 4 drama series Number 10. Other work for Radio 4 includes the comedies Deadheading and Modesty Blaise, both of which have 5 episodes each. He has often played multiple characters in the same production.

== Other work ==
Hollingworth plays the band manager in the music video for The Futureheads' single "Walking Backwards". An award-winning student journalist, he has written occasional pieces about acting. His short plays have been performed in London at the Arcola, Soho Theatre and Tristan Bates Theatre. His first full-length play Multitudes which is set in the City of Bradford, was performed at the Tricycle Theatre in February 2015, directed by artistic director Indhu Rubasingham. In 2018, Hollingworth wrote Songs for the Seven Hills for Sheffield Theatres for their community company The Sheffield People's Theatre.

== Filmography ==
=== Film ===
Year	Title	Role	Notes	Ref.
2009	Dorian Gray	Patrol Policeman		
2010	Pelican Blood	Owen Whittle		
2010	Godard & Others	PC Dale		
2011	The Burma Conspiracy	Invité Plateau CNBC		
2012	The Dark Knight Rises	CIA Analyst		
2016	The Legend of Tarzan	Steward		
2017	Transformers: The Last Knight	Tristan		
2018	Kursk	Bruce Hamil Lt.		
2019	1917	Sergeant Guthrie		
2020	Rebecca	Giles Lacy		
2021	In the Earth	James		
2022	Trouble in Mind	Bill O'Wray		
2023	Napoleon	Marshal Ney		
2026	Elsinore			

=== Television ===
Year	Title	Role	Notes	Ref.
2009	Wuthering Heights	Robert	ITV miniseries	
2009	Casualty 1909	Police Constable		
2009	Being Human	Turlow	Episode: "Bad Moon Rising"	
2011	Twenty Twelve	Reporter	BBC series	
2011	The Man Who Crossed Hitler	Max Fürst	TV film	
2011	London's Burning	Community Policeman	Channel 4 TV film	
2012	The Hour	Alastair	3 episodes	
2013	Breathless	Terence	Episode #1.1	
2013, 2021	Endeavour	Taxi Driver / Dan Lofthouse	Episodes: "Home" (2013) and "Striker" (2021)	
2014	Da Vinci's Demons	Francesco Sassetti	4 episodes	
2014	Crossing Lines	Lawrence Baxendale	Episode: "The Velvet Glove"	
2014	Our World War	Lieutenant Cohen	Episode: "War Machine"	
2015	Arthur & George	Dr Butter	3 episodes	
2015	Top Coppers	Peterson	6 episodes	
2015	Josh	Teabag	Episode: "Teabag and No Sympathy"	
2015–2017	Poldark	Captain Henshawe	20 episodes	
2016	Dark Angel	Dr John Maling	2 episodes	
2016	Midsomer Murders	Brin Dunne	Episode: "A Dying Art"	
2016	Damilola, Our Loved Boy	Detective Wallace	Docudrama	
2017–2019	Doc Martin	Professor Sam Bradman	5 episodes	
2019	The Crown	Lord Porchester	Episode: "Coup"	
2019	Vera	PC Shawn Turnley	Episode: "Cuckoo"	
2019–2022	Gentleman Jack	Mr Abbott	4 episodes	
2020	The Queen's Gambit	Randall Foster	Episode: "End Game"	
2020	Soulmates	Brother Hickock	Episode: "Break on Through"	
2020	Call the Midwife	Tony Venables	Episode: "Christmas Special"	
2021	Dalgliesh	Dr. Eric Hewson	2 episodes	
2022	The Witchfinder	Rafe	Episode #1.2	
2022	The Midwich Cuckoos	Michael	Episode: "Bad Things"	
2023	Beyond Paradise	Andrew Parker	Episode #1.4	
2023	Sister Boniface Mysteries	Trevor Symonds	Episode: "The Good Samaritan"	
2023	The Full Monty	James Warner	Episode: "Leveling Up"	
2024	Mr Bates vs The Post Office	James Hartley	2 episodes	
2024	Belgravia: The Next Chapter	Dr. Kerry	2 episodes	
2024	Professor T.	Peter Tierney	Episode: "Attachment Issues"	
2024	Franklin	Viscomte de Stormont/Lord David Stormont	3 episodes	
2024	Generation Z	Sergeant Parrenster	Post-production	
2025	The Bombing of Pan Am 103	Seymour	2 episodes	
2026	Patience	CS Callum Banks	Episode: "Hostage"	
2026	Coronation Street	Vincent Harper	Episode #1.11770	
2026	Ellis	DS Malcolm Oliver	2 episodes	
