= Dark Angel (British TV series) =

British drama miniseries

- Promotional poster
- Genre: Crime drama Thriller
- Based on: Mary Ann Cotton: Britain's First Female Serial Killer by David Wilson
- Written by: Gwyneth Hughes
- Directed by: Brian Percival
- Starring: Joanne Froggatt; Alun Armstrong; Penny Layden; Laura Morgan; Jonas Armstrong; Sam Hoare; Emma Fielding; John Hollingworth
- Theme music composer: Michael J McEvoy
- Country of origin: United Kingdom
- Original language: English
- No. of series: 1
- No. of episodes: 2

Production
- Executive producers: Simon Heath; Gwyneth Hughes; Kirstie MacDonald
- Producer: Jake Lushington
- Running time: 180 minutes (inc. advertisements)
- Production companies: Centurion Productions; Screen Yorkshire; World Productions

Original release
- Network: ITV
- Release: 31 October – 7 November 2016

Dark Angel is a British two-part television drama miniseries, based on the adaptation of the book Mary Ann Cotton: Britain's First Female Serial Killer by David Wilson. The series was broadcast on 31 October and 7 November 2016, and starred Joanne Froggatt as protagonist Mary Ann Cotton.

== Synopsis ==
Widely regarded as Britain's first known female serial killer, Mary Ann Cotton was found guilty of murder in March 1873 for the murder of three of her husbands, allegedly in order to collect on their insurance policies.

== Cast ==
- Joanne Froggatt as Mary Ann Cotton, serial killer
- Alun Armstrong as George Stott, Mary Ann's stepfather
- Penny Layden as Margaret Stott, Mary Ann's mother
- Laura Morgan as Maggie Cotton, Mary Ann's best friend
- Jonas Armstrong as Joe Nattrass, Mary Ann's secret lover and later, fifth partner
- Sam Hoare as James Robinson, Mary Ann's third husband
- Emma Fielding as Helen Robinson, James's sister
- John Hollingworth as Dr. John Maling, district GP

=== Recurring characters ===
- Tom Varey as Billy Mowbray, Mary Ann's first husband
- Thomas Howes as George Ward, Mary Ann's second husband
- Isla McMonigle as Isabella Mowbray, Mary Ann and Billy's daughter
- Hayley Walters as Elizabeth Robinson, James' daughter
- Alexander McMonigle as James Robinson, Jr., James' son
- George Kent as William Robinson, James' son
- John Bowler as Mr. Johnson, life insurance agent
- Ferdy Roberts as John Quick-Manning, Mary Ann's final love interest
- Phil Cheadle as Dr. Kilburn, district GP
- Joanna Horton as Sarah Edwards, Mary Ann's neighbour
- Mark Holgate as William Edwards, Sarah's husband
- Mark Underwood as Fred Cotton, Maggie's brother and Mary Ann's fourth husband
- Jake Lawson as Charlie Cotton, Fred's son
- Seamus O'Neil as William Calcraft, hangman

=== Minor characters ===
- Laura-Jane Matthewson as Jane Headley
- Jacob Anderton as Issac Headley
- Jamie B. Chambers as Robert Evans
- Shaun Prendergast as Sergeant Hutchinson, local policeman
- George Potts as Mr. Wensolom, an insurance agent
- Paul Brennen as Mr. Riley, a local grocer and chemist
- Edward Gower as Mr. Stranger, a vicar
- Bill Fellows as Mr. Brownlee
- Niall Ashdown as Mr. Draper
- Paul Bentall as the Seaham Minister
- Mike Burnside as the Sunderland Doctor
- Michael Culkin as the Sunderland Vicar
- Nigel Cooke as the Sunderland Minister

== Production ==
In July 2015, production and filming began on Dark Angel, starring Joanne Froggatt of Downton Abbey as Mary Ann Cotton. Alun Armstrong, Jonas Armstrong and Emma Fielding also had roles in the series. Inspired by the book Mary Ann Cotton: Britain's First Female Serial Killer, the drama used writer David Wilson as a consultant during the script-writing stage. The series was produced by World Productions and distributed by Endemol Shine. The series co-starred Alun Armstrong as Mary Ann's step-father, George Stott, and Jonas Armstrong as her main love interest, Joe Nattrass. Penny Layden, Laura Morgan, Sam Hoare, and Emma Fielding also took starring roles in the two-part drama.

The drama is the seventh in a series of ITV mini-series featuring notorious British murder cases of the past two centuries, following on from This Is Personal: The Hunt for the Yorkshire Ripper (2000), Shipman (2002), A Is for Acid (2002), The Brides in the Bath (2003), See No Evil: The Moors Murders (2006), and Appropriate Adult (2011). It was followed by an eighth ITV mini-series entitled White House Farm and a ninth entitled Des (both 2020).
