= Morven Christie =

Scottish actress (born 1981)

- Born: 1 September 1982 (age 44); Dunbartonshire, Scotland
- Years active: 2004–present
- Spouse: Scott Graham (2012–2015)
- Partner: Iain Cook

Morven Christie is a Scottish actress and filmmaker.

== Early life and education ==
Christie was born in Dunbartonshire and raised in Glasgow. She left school at 15. She studied method acting at the Drama Centre London, under Reuven Adiv, an associate of Lee Strasberg.

== Career ==
=== Theatre ===
Christie has multiple stage credits, spanning over a decade, including plays by Jack Thorne and Tom Stoppard alongside a classical canon. In 2006, Christie starred in the William Shakespeare plays Romeo & Juliet (as Juliet), Much Ado About Nothing (as Hero), and King John (as Blanche) for the Royal Shakespeare Company in their star-studded Complete Works season.

In 2009, Christie played Anya in the Anton Chekhov play The Cherry Orchard and Perdita in the Shakespeare play The Winter's Tale, for Sam Mendes' "Bridge Project", both at Brooklyn Academy of Music, New York and at The Old Vic, London, alongside Simon Russell Beale, Ethan Hawke and Rebecca Hall. She played Isa in the National Theatre, Glasgow, production of Men Should Weep, directed by Josie Rourke.

=== Television and film ===
In 2014, Christie played Amanda Hopkins in the ITV drama Grantchester for its first three seasons with James Norton and Robson Green. In 2017, she played Ellen Rooney in the BBC drama The Replacement, alongside Vicky McClure, and Dougray Scott. This role gained Christie her first BAFTA Scotland nomination.

From 2016 to 2020, she played Alison Hughes, the mother of an autistic child, in the BBC drama The A Word, for which she was again nominated for a BAFTA Scotland Award. In 2018 she also played Kirsten Lindstrom in Sarah Phelps' production of Agatha Christie's Ordeal by Innocence.

Christie starred as DS Lisa Armstrong, the lead role in the ITV crime drama series The Bay, filmed through the latter months of 2018, and aired on ITV from 20 March 2019. She received her third consecutive BAFTA Scotland nomination for her performance. It was announced on 16 February 2021 that Christie had quit the drama, which had just completed a second series.

Post her exit, she completed two independent films and the Joe Cornish eight-part drama Lockwood & Co. for Netflix.

In 2023, she led a six-part drama Payback, for Jed Mercurio's HTM label, opposite Peter Mullan, airing on ITV and internationally.

In 2024 she began shooting the role of Anna Thurman in Apple TV's Silo, and features in the third season of the television series.

In 2025 she wrote and directed short film, STRAY, and is in development as writer/director of her debut feature.

== Personal life ==
Christie lives in Glasgow with her partner, musician Iain Cook.

== Filmography ==
=== Film ===
Year	Title	Role	Notes
2005	Dot.Kill	Jane	
2005	House of 9	Shona	
2006	The Flying Scotsman	Katie	
2009	The Young Victoria	Watson	
2010	Hollow	Alice	Short film
2011	Gee Gee	Peaches	Short film
2012	Shell	Young Mother	
2013	The Date	Mona	Short film
2014	Lilting	Margaret	
2014	Between Places	Liv	Short film
2021	Angels in the Asylum	Mary	Short film
2022	The Road Dance	Mairi Macleod	
2022	Floodlights	Jean Woodward	
2026	Borges and Me	Miss Rose	

=== Television ===
Year	Title	Role	Notes
2004	The Second Quest	Nina	Television film
2004	Doctors	Lizzie Franklin	1 episode
2004	Quite Ugly One Morning	DS Jenny Dunlop	Television film
2004	Teachers	Anna	1 episode
2006	The Family Man	Joanne	Television film
2007	Sold	Trish	1 episode
2007	Oliver Twist	Rose Maylie	Miniseries
2008	Harley Street	Danni Lacey	1 episode
2008	Lost in Austen	Jane Bennet	Miniseries
2009	Monday Monday	Sally Newman	7 episodes
2009	Survivors	Judy	1 episode
2010	The Sinking of the Laconia	Laura Ferguson	1 episode
2011	Case Histories	Michelle Moore	2 episodes
2011	Sirens	Kirsty Schelmerdine	3 episodes
2012	Twenty Twelve	Fi Healey	7 episodes
2012	Hunted	Zoe	8 episodes
2013	Agatha Christie's Poirot	Elsie Clayton	Episode: "The Labours of Hercules"
2014	From There to Here	Louise	Miniseries
2014	Death in Paradise	Sally Goodman	2 episodes
2014	Silent Witness	DS Sally Kirchner	2 episodes
2014–2017	Grantchester	Amanda Kendall	19 episodes
2015	Doctor Who	O'Donnell	2 episodes
2016	Murder	DS Corinne Evans	1 episode
2016–2020	The A Word	Alison Hughes	17 episodes
2017	The Replacement	Ellen Rooney	3 episodes
2018	Ordeal by Innocence	Kirsten Lindstrom	Miniseries
2019–2021	The Bay	DS Lisa Armstrong	12 episodes
2023	Lockwood & Co.	Penelope Fittes	3 episodes
2023	Payback	Lexie Noble	6 episodes
2026–present	Silo	Anna Thurman	5 episodes

== Stage ==
Year	Title	Role	Theatre Company
2005	Festen	Pia	Lyric Theatre, London
2005	When You Cure Me	Rachel	Bush Theatre, London
2006	Romeo & Juliet	Juliet	Royal Shakespeare Company
2006–2007	Much Ado About Nothing	Hero	Royal Shakespeare Company
2006	King John	Blanche	Royal Shakespeare Company
2009	The Cherry Orchard	Anya	New York, London and international tour
2009	The Winter's Tale	Perdita	
2010–2011	Men Should Weep	Isa Morrison	Royal National Theatre, London
2015	The Driver's Seat	Lise	National Theatre of Scotland

== Audio ==
=== Radio ===
- When You Cure Me (2006, radio play) as Rachel
- An Inspector Calls as Sheila Birling
- Whenever I Get Blown Up I Think of You as Molly Naylor
- A Farewell to Arms (2011, BBC Radio 4) as Catherine Barkley
- Austerlitz (December 2012, BBC Radio 3) as Agata

=== Audiobooks ===
- Code Name Verity (2012) as Queenie/Verity (Co-read with Lucy Gaskell)
- Burial Rites (2013)
