= The Drowning (TV series) =

British crime drama

- Genre: Thriller
- Created by: Francesca Brill; Luke Watson
- Written by: Francesca Brill; Luke Watson
- Directed by: Carolina Giammetta
- Starring: Jill Halfpenny; Jonas Armstrong; Deborah Findlay; Rupert Penry-Jones
- Country of origin: United Kingdom
- Original language: English
- No. of series: 1
- No. of episodes: 4

Production
- Executive producers: Francesca Brill; Luke Watson
- Producers: Noel Clarke; Jason Maza
- Running time: 60 minutes (inc. adverts)

Original release
- Network: Channel 5
- Release: 1 February – 4 February 2021

The Drowning is a British four-part television thriller drama miniseries written and created by Francesca Brill and Luke Watson. It was first broadcast on Channel 5 on four consecutive nights from 1 February 2021. It stars Jill Halfpenny, Jonas Armstrong, Deborah Findlay, and Rupert Penry-Jones.

== Synopsis ==
Jodie Walsh is a woman with a struggling business and money problems. She has been trying to rebuild her life after the loss of her four year old son, Tom, from drowning. His body was never recovered. Nine years later, she sees a boy who looks like an older version of her son. Faced with skepticism from her family and the police, she sets out to find the truth.

== Cast ==
- Jill Halfpenny as Jodie Walsh
- Jonas Armstrong as Jason Walsh, Jodie's brother
- Deborah Findlay as Lynn Walsh, Jodie's mother
- Babs Olusanmokun as Ade, an employee of Jodie and Yasmin's landscaping business
- Jade Anouka as Yasmin, Jodie's partner
- Cody Molko as Daniel Tanner, the boy Jodie believes is Tom
- Dara Devaney as Ben Gilmour, Jodie's ex-husband and Tom's father
- Deirdre Mullins as Kate Gilmour, Ben's wife and previously Jodie's best friend
- Rupert Penry-Jones as Mark Tanner, Daniel's father
- Jason Maza as DS Harvey (also executive producer alongside Noel Clarke)

== Production ==
The Drowning was filmed in and around Dublin, Ireland.

== Episodes ==
No.	Title	Directed by	Written by	Original release date	U.K. viewers (millions)
1	"Episode One"	Carolina Giammetta	Francesca Brill and Luke Watson	1 February 2021	6.10
While driving on her way to see a client for a crucial pitch, Jodie sees teenager Daniel boarding a bus. She is convinced she has found her missing son who drowned eight years earlier and whose body was never found. She contacts the police who refuse to follow up and she sets about on a quest to find him.
2	"Episode Two"	Carolina Giammetta	Francesca Brill, Luke Watson and Tim Dynevor	2 February 2021	5.57
Jodie begins tutoring Daniel privately at his home in order to enable her to search for evidence that he is her missing son. An interruption from Mark prevents her from investigating any further.
3	"Episode Three"	Carolina Giammetta	Francesca Brill, Luke Watson and Tim Dynevor	3 February 2021	5.16
Jodie gets Daniel to take a DNA test and makes arrangements to obtain him a passport so they can flee the country for a fresh start. When Jodie returns home from visiting the forgers, Daniel is nowhere to be found but he leaves a note to say he will see her the following day.
4	"Episode Four"	Carolina Giammetta	Tim Dynevor	4 February 2021	5.34
The confusion around Daniel's identity begins to increase significantly as secrets begin to unfold. Someone close to Jodie will stop at nothing and is intent on protecting themselves, and stopping Jodie's hunt for the truth. Jodie has no option but to face what happened during the drowning incident at the scene where it all took place.

== Reception ==
Flora Carr reviewing on behalf of the Radio Times gave the first episode three stars out of five and described it as “A predictable yet gripping thriller about a grieving mother”, while Katie Rosseinsky reviewing on behalf of Evening Standard rated the first episode three stars out of five and acknowledged, “Jill Halfpenny is compelling as a grieving mother in this gripping thriller”. The Telegraph review by Anita Singh reported “Yes, it's not remotely credible but The Drowning is a no-nonsense thriller that keeps you guessing” and gave the first episode four out of five stars, the same rating as Lucy Mangan gave it in The Guardian.

The Drowning bypassed All Creatures Great and Small to become Channel 5's highest rated show since 1 September 2020. Using BARB's consolidated ratings for programmes watched live and on catch-up services (within 28 days), The Drowning is their most popular broadcast ever, with the episode on 1 February 2021 now getting 6.10 million viewers and the other three episodes getting more than 5 million viewers, per initial broadcast.
