= Daragh Carville =

Irish playwright, screenwriter and educator

Daragh Carville (born 1969) is an Irish playwright and screenwriter. He is best known for co-creating and writing the ITV crime drama The Bay, first broadcast on ITV in 2019.

== Early life and education ==
Daragh Carville was born in Armagh, Northern Ireland, in 1969.

== Career ==
=== Stage ===
Theatre credits include Language Roulette (Bush Theatre, London and Traverse Theatre, Edinburgh), Observatory (Peacock Theatre, Dublin) and This Other City (Grand Opera House, Belfast). His play The Life and Times of Mitchell & Kenyon opened at The Dukes Theatre, Lancaster in April 2014.

His radio credits include Regenerations (BBC Radio 3), which features on the BBC Audio release Doctor Who at the BBC: The Plays, and Dracula (BBC Radio 4) starring Michael Fassbender.

=== Screen ===
Carville's first feature film, Middletown, premiered at the Tribeca Film Festival in New York in 2006. The film, which stars Matthew Macfadyen, Daniel Mays, Eva Birthistle and Gerard McSorley, was directed by Brian Kirk and produced by Michael Casey of Green Park Films. It was nominated in nine categories at the 2007 Irish Film and Television Awards, including Best Film and Best Screenplay, with Eva Birthistle picking up the award for Best Actress.

Carville's second film, Cherrybomb, starring Rupert Grint, Robert Sheehan, Kimberley Nixon and James Nesbitt and directed by Glenn Leyburn and Lisa Barros d’Sa, was selected for the Generations section of the 2009 Berlin Film Festival and won the Audience Award at the 2009 Belfast Film Festival. Cherrybomb went on general release in the UK and Ireland in April 2010, distributed by Universal.

Carville co-created and wrote the ITV crime drama The Bay, first broadcast on ITV in 2019. The second series of The Bay screened on ITV in 2021, a third broadcast in 2022, with a fourth series in production. In addition to The Bay, other television work included episodes of BBC Three’s Being Human, BBC Northern Ireland's student drama 6Degrees and the Kudos/Sky One firefighter drama The Smoke.

== Awards ==
Carville won the Stewart Parker Trust Award and the Meyer-Whitworth Award for Language Roulette.
