= Floodlights (film) =

British television film

Floodlights is a British television film first broadcast on BBC Two on 17 May 2022. The film is about Andy Woodward, a former professional footballer who in 2016 revealed that he was a victim of child sexual abuse by the predatory coach Barry Bennell. Woodward is played by Gerard Kearns and his younger self by screen debutant Max Fletcher, and Bennell by Jonas Armstrong. The film was praised for the acting by its three leads, and how it conveyed the emotional pain of abuse without showing it on screen.

== Plot ==
Andy Woodward is a gifted young football defender from Stockport who attracts the attention of Barry Bennell. Bennell, who has moved from Manchester City to Crewe Alexandra, is regarded as one of the best youth coaches in the game. He convinces Woodward's parents through his charisma and promises the boy to make him rich and lift his family out of poverty. Woodward and other boys stay for a sleepover at the coach's house, which is full of video games and other entertainment. Bennell says that Woodward must sleep with him as there are no other beds. In bed, Bennell initiates a touching game which concludes with the boy touching his genitalia. Bennell continues his cycle of abuse over Woodward by freezing him out the team whenever the boy repels his assaults.

In the late 1990s, Woodward is playing well professionally for Bury under manager Neil Warnock, when he is approached by police detectives. Bennell is due to return to Britain after serving a sentence for crimes in the United States, and the police see Woodward as a key witness for their investigation. He submits an anonymised report that leads to Bennell being jailed in England. Woodward's mental health deteriorates as a result of the relived trauma, and his professional career unravels. He visits his abuser in prison, speaking of his intention to sue Crewe Alexandra. Bennell says that Woodward is chasing money for his failed career, and that he never complained about the abuse at the time.

In the 2010s, Woodward is dismissed from the Greater Manchester Police for a sexual relationship with a woman for whom he was a family liaison officer. He reaches out to a childhood teammate on Facebook to talk about the historical abuse, but when he is added by Bennell under his post-prison alias Richard Jones, he attempts suicide. Woodward contacts Guardian journalist Daniel Taylor, wishing to reveal his story anonymously like The Observer's Secret Footballer. Taylor then convinces him that lives could be saved if Woodward goes public with the story.

== Cast ==
- Gerard Kearns as Andrew Woodward
- Jonas Armstrong as Barry Bennell
- Morven Christie as Jean Woodward
- Max Fletcher as Young Woody
- Steve Edge as Terry Woodward
- Neil Bell as DS Haleford
- Mark Holgate as DC Blakefield
- Antony Byrne as Neil Warnock
- Krissi Bohn as DCI Bakewell
- DC Grace Jessica as Baglow
- Lucy Chambers as Lynda

== Production ==
Woodward said that he admired the film Spotlight about the Catholic Church sexual abuse cases but found it to be focused too much on journalists and not on victims. He worked with the screenwriter Matt Greenhalgh to make a film focusing on the emotional journey of victims of child sexual abuse.

Jonas Armstrong was going to audition for the part of Woodward but was eventually convinced by his agent to take the role of Bennell. Armstrong said that he had to portray Bennell's charisma that charmed the parents and children, but also the "demon within him". Woodward said that Armstrong's acting was so similar to Bennell that his sister, who in real life married the coach, was sickened by it.

While the film portrays Woodward having to touch Bennell's genitalia, no abuse is shown in graphic detail. Greenhalgh said that viewers would know what was happening, and said that he had switched off the BBC series Three Girls about the Rochdale child sex abuse ring because of graphic content.

== Reception ==
Stuart Jeffries of The Guardian gave the film four stars out of five, praising the acting by Armstrong, Fletcher and Kearns. He criticised the pacing at the end, considering it to have gone too quickly through Woodward's post-football career. The same rating was given by Sean O'Grady for The Independent, who noted that Armstrong's portrayal of Bennell was enough to menace the audience without abuse being shown on screen.

Further positive reviews came from The Daily Telegraph, The Times, the i (five stars) and the Financial Times.

== See also ==
- United Kingdom football sexual abuse scandal
