= Murder (British TV series) =

- Genre: Crime drama
- Created by: Robert Jones
- Starring: Karla Crome; Joe Dempsie; Robert Pugh; Claire Rushbrook; Peter McDonald; Morven Christie; Anne-Marie Duff; Peter Bowles; Jessica Barden; Michael Smiley
- Country of origin: United Kingdom
- Original language: English
- No. of series: 1
- No. of episodes: 4 (list of episodes)

Production
- Executive producers: Rob Pursey; Matthew Read
- Producer: Kath Mattock
- Running time: 60 minutes

Original release
- Network: BBC Two
- Release: 26 August 2012 – 17 March 2016

Murder is a British television crime drama created and written by Robert Jones. Murder is written in a unique style in which all of the protagonists in each episode engage in monologues to camera, giving their version of what happened on the night, as the investigation proceeds from arrest to court hearing to verdict. Four independent films have been written to date, each starring a number of guest artistes. The first, stand-alone film broadcast on 26 August 2012, with a series of three films following on 3 March 2016. The first film was released on DVD on 11 May 2015 via Acorn Media.

== Plot ==
Each episode of Murder is a stand-alone story, which tells the story of the events leading up to and after a murder has been committed. Its unique style includes a style of writing which uses a technique in which none of the characters interact with each other in any one given scene. Each character is seen to break the "fourth wall" and give a monologue to the audience, explaining their involvement and/or role in the crime committed. Although critically well-received, even receiving the BAFTA award for Best Single Drama in 2013, the first stand-alone film did not receive the same level of public acclaim; with six out of nine reviewers for the DVD release giving the film one star.

However, writer and creator Robert Jones has cited this as an inspiration to spend more than three years to bring a second series to screen. The first two films were directed by Birger Larsen, known for his work on The Killing and many other hit Scandinavian dramas. The first episode was broadcast at 10pm on Sunday 26 August 2012, while the second series will be broadcast in an earlier timeslot, at 9pm, on consecutive Thursdays from 3 March 2016. The Radio Times stated in a review of the first episode of series two that Murder is "one of the most original shows on British TV in recent years."

== Episode list ==
=== Pilot (2012) ===
No.	Title	Directed by	Written by	Original release date	Viewers (millions)
1	"Joint Enterprise"	Robert Jones	Birger Larsen	26 August 2012	N/A
Three complete strangers – who only met at noon that day – find their whole worlds turned upside down by 2.00am after they find themselves embroiled in a murder investigation. A young woman is dead in her Nottingham flat, her terrified sister is barricaded inside the bathroom, and a young man in a bloodstained shirt is pulled over for speeding by local police. It is unknown what happened in those fatal hours, and where the truth lies when their accounts of events do not add up.

=== Series 1 (2016) ===
No.	Title	Directed by	Written by	Original release date	Viewers (millions)
1	"The Third Voice"	Robert Jones	Birger Larsen	3 March 2016	1.56
When Rafe Carey’s body is washed up by the River Tweed, it looks like he has drowned in a tragic accident on a day of extreme weather after the section of riverbank where they were fishing from collapsed. But when DS Corinne Evans (Morven Christie) investigates, she finds the cause of Rafe’s death is not drowning at all – he has been stabbed through the heart, and his brother-in-law Leo is the prime suspect.
2	"The Lost Weekend"	Robert Jones	Paul Wright	10 March 2016	N/A
Wealthy American Arla Beckman, who founded Liferaft, a philanthropic charity organisation for helping kids in trouble, is missing. Known to have been in an extramarital affair with divorced English aristocrat Dominic Cotterall, Arla’s close colleague and friend Bryony Phelps is convinced that Arla’s disappearance is down to Dominic and takes to social media to say as much, prompting a sceptical detective DCI Mirella Goss (Anne-Marie Duff) to take up the case.
3	"The Big Bang"	Robert Jones	Iain Forsyth and Jane Pollard	17 March 2016	N/A
Ten years ago, off-duty policeman PC Prescott was killed in cold blood in a swimming-pool car park, but what has never been ascertained is precisely which one of the three armed robbers serving life for his murder actually pulled the trigger. Seven at the time, Jess witnessed the crime and has been tormented by her memory forging gaps in the official account. However, her hopes are raised when a therapist offers to contact those responsible and finally clear up the matter once and for all.
