= London's Burning (film) =

- Genre: Docudrama
- Based on: 2011 England riots
- Written by: Mark Hayhurst
- Directed by: Justin Hardy
- Starring: David Morrissey; Samantha Bond; Emily Bruni; Anastasia Hille; Brooke Kinsella; Martina Laird; Royce Pierreson; Pete Lee-Wilson
- Country of origin: United Kingdom
- Original language: English
- No. of episodes: 1

Production
- Executive producer: Samir Shah
- Producer: Paula Prynn
- Cinematography: Douglas Hartington
- Running time: 60 minutes
- Production company: Juniper Communications

Original release
- Network: Channel 4
- Release: 22 December 2011

London's Burning (credited on-screen as London's Burning 2011) is a single British television docudrama film, written by Mark Hayhurst and directed by Justin Hardy, that premiered on Channel 4 on 22 December 2011. Based upon the events of the 2011 England riots, written from "first-hand testimony" and incorporating real-life footage from CCTV cameras, journalists & members of the public, the film stars David Morrissey and Samantha Bond as the senior police officers assigned to oversee deployment of police resources across the capital as the riots begin to escalate following the events of 4 August, which saw the Death of Mark Duggan at the hands of the Metropolitan Police.

The film focuses predominantly on events that occurred in and around the area of Clapham. Notably, both Morrissey's and Bond's characters were unnamed in the programme credits, with only subsequent news articles naming Morrissey's character as Gerry Campbell.

The film is available to view in full on Dailymotion. Douglas Hartington, director of photography, has also uploaded part of the film on his website as part of his active showreel.

== Reception ==
The Times gave the film a positive review, writing; "This dramatisation, quite rightly, made heroes of the retailers whom the riot mob was cowardly enough to target", and went on to describe the film as a "British version of John Carpenter's 1976 movie Assault on Precinct 13".

The Independent also gave a positive review, writing; "London's Burning was utterly, Killingesquely compelling. Based on witness testimonies, it saw David Morrissey and Samantha Bond star in a dramatisation of the days during which the capital seemed to go mad. Whether or not it was very good is a different question. But for a Londoner, it was riot porn. You couldn't help but be fascinated."

== Cast ==
- David Morrissey as Borough Commander Gerry Campbell
- Samantha Bond as Superintendent
- Emily Bruni as Onelia
- Anastasia Hille as Jan
- Brooke Kinsella as Rixy
- Martina Laird as Rachel
- Royce Pierreson as Alex
- Pete Lee-Wilson as John
- Jack Chissick as Duncan
- Troy Glasgow as Lee
- Alex Hanson as Nick
- Joanna Horton as Dolly
- James Hillier
- Ansu Kabia
