= Payback (British TV series) =

British television series

- Genre: Crime thriller
- Created by: Debbie O'Malley
- Screenplay by: Debbie O'Malley
- Directed by: Jenny Darnell; Andrew Cumming
- Starring: Morven Christie; Peter Mullan
- Music by: Chris Roe
- Country of origin: United Kingdom
- Original language: English
- No. of series: 1
- No. of episodes: 6

Production
- Executive producers: Jed Mercurio; Madonna Baptiste; Polly Hill; Debbie O'Malley; Diederick Santer
- Producer: Eric Coulter
- Production companies: HTM Television; ITV Studios; BritBox International

Original release
- Network: ITV1
- Release: 4 October – 8 November 2023

Payback is a six-part British crime thriller television series broadcast weekly on ITV1 from 4 October 2023, executive produced by Jed Mercurio and starring Morven Christie and Peter Mullan.

== Synopsis ==
Following the murder of her accountant husband, a woman learns that he had been laundering money for criminal organisations.

== Cast ==
- Peter Mullan as Cal Norris
- Morven Christie as Lexie Noble
- Prasanna Puwanarajah as DC Jibran Khan
- Derek Riddell as DCI Adam Guthrie
- Steven Mackintosh as Malky Roberts
- Eileen Duffy as Doris Szabo
- Jack Greenlees as Aaron Morris
- Andi Osho as DI Jean Royce
- Steven Miller as DS Rob Livingston
- Henry Pettigrew as Rufus Hayes
- Julie Graham as Connie Morris
- Anneika Rose as Rowena Hayes
- Grace Chilton as DC Alice Hardys

== Production ==
The six-part series was created by Debbie O'Malley and had Madonna Baptiste and Jed Mercurio as executive producers for HTM Television. O'Malley drew inspiration in part from a true-life unsolved crime in Nairn, Scotland of the Murder of Alistair Wilson, a banker shot dead on his doorstep in 2004. Mercurio was keen to examine the role of accountants and accountancy in illegal operations following the leak of data from the Panama Papers scandal. The series had an advisor named Kenny Thomson, a former DCI in financial crime for Police Scotland. The series was also executive produced by O’Malley and Diederick Santer on behalf of BritBox International and Polly Hill for ITV Studios. Eric Coulter was series producer.

The series had Jenny Darnell as the lead director, with Andrew Cumming also directing episodes. Filming took place near Glasgow in Scotland.

The cast is led by Morven Christie and Peter Mullan, and also includes Prasanna Puwanarajah, Derek Riddell, Steven Mackintosh, Andi Osho, Steven Miller, Eileen Duffy, Jack Greenlees Henry Pettigrew, Grace Chilton and Julie Graham.

== Broadcast ==
The series was broadcast weekly in the United Kingdom on ITV1 between 4 October and 8 November 2023.

== Reception ==
Gerard Gilbert in the i praised the lead performances saying that the "excellent but unshowy Christie belongs in the same pantheon as Nicola Walker and Vicky McClure" while…Peter Mullan "returns to his menacing best". Lucy Mangan in The Guardian also praised the cast, saying that it "offers the inordinate pleasure of watching quality, understated actors do their quality understated work, without a weak link among them".
