= Carolina Giammetta =

English film director

- Born: 3 February 1970 (age 56); Nottingham, Nottinghamshire, England, UK
- Occupations: Film director and actress
- Years active: 1993–present

Carolina Giammetta (born 3 February 1970) is a British film director and actress.

== Biography ==
Giammetta was born in Nottingham to Italian immigrant parents. She is dyslexic. Giammetta was one of the inaugural members of the Central Junior Television Workshop and went on to train at drama school.

=== Career ===
Between 2016 and 2019, Giammetta directed 15 episodes of BBC One's medical soap opera Doctors, while in 2017 she directed two episodes of the 32nd season of British TV series Casualty. In 2024 she directed the second season of Suspect, starring Dominic Cooper and Anne-Marie Duff; a thriller crime-drama based on Danish TV series Face to Face. For Channel 4 she also directed crime drama Before We Die (2023). Since 2025 she has been the director of TV series Bookish, starring Mark Gatiss. In February 2025 it was announced that Giammetta had been hired by British production company Eagle Eye to develop and direct upcoming dramas from the company.

Giammetta also directed ITV's Hollington Drive and four-part television thriller drama The Drowning, which aired on Paramount-owned British network Channel 5 in February 2021.

== Filmography ==
=== Film ===
| Year | Title | Role | Notes |
|---|---|---|---|
| 1993 | Naked | Masseuse | |
| 2000 | The Asylum | Tessa | |
| 2002 | Outside the Rules | Kim Andrews | |
| 2004 | Hawking | Lidia Sciama | |
| 2006 | Venus | Health Center Nurse | |
| 2008 | Toscanini: In His Own Words | Wally Toscanini | |
| 2009 | The Unloved | Teacher | |
| 2010 | Oranges and Sunshine | Charity Rep. 2 | |

=== Television ===
| Year | Title | Role | Notes |
|---|---|---|---|
| 2016–2019 | Doctors | | Director; 15 episodes |
| 2017 | Casualty | | Director; 2 episodes |
| 2018 | Shakespeare & Hathaway: Private Investigators | | Director; 2 episodes |
| 2019 | Agatha Raisin | | Director; 1 episode |
| 2019–2020 | Vera | | Director; 2 episodes |
| 2021 | The Drowning | | Director |
| 2021 | Hollington Drive | | Director |
| 2023 | Before We Die | | Director; Series 2 |
| 2024 | Suspect | | Director; Series 2 |
| 2025–present | Bookish | | Director |
