= Hollington Drive =

Television drama

- Genre: Thriller
- Created by: Sophie Petzal
- Written by: Sophie Petzal
- Directed by: Carolina Giammetta
- Starring: Anna Maxwell Martin; Rachael Stirling; Peter McDonald; Rhashan Stone
- Composer: Sarah Warne
- Country of origin: United Kingdom
- Original language: English
- No. of series: 1
- No. of episodes: 4

Production
- Executive producers: Sophie Petzal; Jonathan Fisher
- Producer: Catrin Lewis Defis
- Cinematography: Adam Etherington
- Editor: Matthew Tabern
- Running time: 60 minutes
- Production company: West Road Pictures

Original release
- Network: ITV
- Release: 29 September – 20 October 2021

Hollington Drive is a four part ITV television drama series that began broadcasting on 29 September 2021. Created and written by Sophie Petzal, the series follows two sisters and their families as they grapple with the potential crime of their children.

== Synopsis ==
Two sisters, café chain owner Theresa (Anna Maxwell Martin) and primary school headteacher Helen (Rachael Stirling), are inseparable, living side-by-side with their families in well-to-do suburban Hollington Drive. One summer evening, after their children go out to play, a local boy, Alex, goes missing. The mystery tears the families apart and tests the sisters' bond to the limit.

== Cast ==
- Anna Maxwell Martin as Theresa Wescott
- Rachael Stirling as Helen Bardwell, her sister
- Peter McDonald as David Bardwell, Helen's husband
- Rhashan Stone as Fraser, Theresa's partner
- Jonas Armstrong as Gareth Boyd, Alex's father
- Jodie McNee as Jean Boyd, Alex's mother
- Ken Nwosu as Eddie, Fraser's brother
- Jim Howick as Detective Sergeant Robin Parks
- Amelie Bea Smith as Eva Bardwell, Helen and David's daughter
- Fraser Holmes as Ben Wescott, Theresa's son
- Tia May Watts as Georgina, Fraser's daughter

== Episode list ==
No.	Title	Directed by	Written by	Original release date	U.K. viewers (millions)
1	"1.1"	Carolina Giammetta	Sophie Petzal	29 September 2021	5.22
2	"1.2"	Carolina Giammetta	Sophie Petzal	6 October 2021	4.54
3	"1.3"	Carolina Giammetta	Sophie Petzal	13 October 2021	4.25
4	"1.4"	Carolina Giammetta	Sophie Petzal	20 October 2021	4.40

== Production ==
The fictitious upmarket 'Hollington Drive' where most of the filming was done is on Ardwyn Walk in Dinas Powys in southern Wales. Other filming locations are the Hang Fire Southern Kitchen restaurant in Barry (Wales) and Sanatorium Park (Cardiff).

== Reception ==
Lucy Mangan of The Guardian gave the first episode three out of five stars, praising the leads and potential. Ed Cumming of The Independent gave the first episode three out of five stars, questioning some of the tropes, but writing of Martin, "[she] is incapable of playing a scene without emotional intelligence, and brilliantly conveys a woman whose mind is racing to nightmarish conclusions while she maintains an appearance of calm", and Stirling, "a worthy foil to her, all patrician vowels and buttoned-up denial, in pronounced contrast to Theresa’s doom". The Telegraph gave it four out of five stars, dubbing it, "layered and intriguing".
