= Andi Osho =

British actress and writer

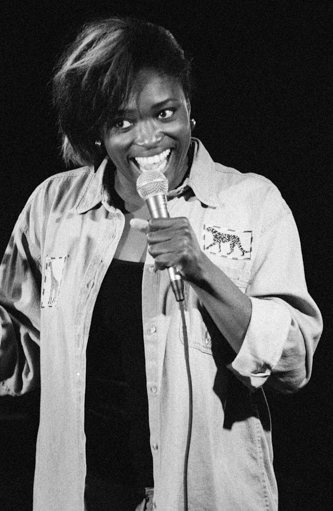
- Osho in 2013
- Born: Yewande Morenike Osho; Plaistow, London, England
- Notable work: Line of Duty (2021); Blue Lights (2023-present)

Comedy career
- Years active: 2003–present
- Medium: Television , film, podcast
- Website: andiosho.co.uk

Yewande "Andi" Morenike Osho is a British actress and writer. She was previously a stand-up comedian and television presenter. She is known for her roles in recent police drama series Line of Duty and Blue Lights, and Payback.

== Early life and education ==
Yewande Morenike Osho, known as Andi, was born in Plaistow, East London to Nigerian parents. She studied performing arts for her A-levels at Barking and Dagenham College.

== Career ==
After working in television production, Osho turned to acting in 2003. By 2006, she decided to go into stand-up comedy. Osho spent a number of years working as a receptionist by day, while improving her stand-up comedy routines in the evenings.

In 2006, Osho starred as Alma in American playwright Dael Orlandersmith's drama Yellowman at Liverpool's Everyman Theatre. Other theatre work includes a performance in the title role of Medea (Barons Court Theatre, 2005), Amanda in Cigarettes, Coffee and Paranoia (King's Head Theatre, 2005) and Zimbabwean exile Faith in the devised piece Qabuka (Oval House Theatre, 2005).

Osho's television roles include Lin Colvin in Casualty, Adeola Brooker in Doctors, Dr Rogers in Footballers' Wives: Extra Time and Angela Parker in Sea of Souls. She has also appeared in Waking the Dead, EastEnders, Comedy Central's @midnight, Night and Day, Kiri, and Russell Brand and Friends for Channel 4. In 2020, she appeared in Death in Paradise.

Osho is also a playwright and one of the founding members of the London writers' group, Vowel Movement. She has contributed to News Review at London's Canal Cafe Theatre and in 2008, she co-devised a scratch performance of the stage play Up the Café de Paris for the Pulse Fringe Festival. In 2007, she wrote the comedy CSI: Nigeria, in production for BBC Three.

Osho has performed at various comedy clubs and festivals across Britain, including Jongleurs, the Comedy Store, the Reading Festival, the Pleasance Dome, the Chuckle Club, the Leicester Festival (Summer Sundae), the Comedy Café, the Shoreditch Comedy Festival, Comedy Camp, and the Hackney Empire.

Osho co-hosted Tonightly on Channel 4 and appeared in an E4 pilot, The Andi O Show. She has also appeared on Mock the Week, Ask Rhod Gilbert, and is a regular performer on Stand Up for the Week.

On 26 February 2011, Osho participated in Let's Dance for Comic Relief, performing a dance routine to Michael Jackson's "Bad". Despite positive comments from the judges, she did not progress to the final round after a public vote.

On 19 June 2012, Osho made her debut in the BBC television medical drama Holby City as medical student Barbara Alcock for three episodes. In July 2014, she appeared in Finding Carter as Susan Sherman. Between 2016 and 2018 she presented Supershoppers with Anna Richardson on Channel 4, being replaced with Sabrina Grant.

Osho appears in David F. Sandberg's films Lights Out and Shazam! as the same character, a social worker named Emma Glover.

In 2021, Osho appeared in the sixth series of the police procedural drama series Line of Duty as journalist and investigative reporter Gail Vella, a murder victim whose case is supervised by DCI Joanne Davidson (Kelly Macdonald).

In 2023, she began appearing as series regular PS Sandra Cliff in the ongoing police drama Blue Lights, set in Belfast. In the same year, she played Nicky Bowman in Sex Education, and as DI Jean Royce in Payback.

=== Game shows ===
Osho has won two episodes of Celebrity Mastermind. In 2011, she won the Comic Relief episode with The Matrix trilogy as her specialist subject and then in 2012, she took part in a regular episode choosing host John Humphrys as her specialist subject.

She took part and won £7,000 for charity in a celebrity edition of The Chase on ITV.

=== Writing ===
Osho's debut novel, Asking for a Friend, was first published in 2021. This was followed by Tough Crowd (2023), and Most Wanted (2026).

== Recognition and awards ==
Osho won the 2007 Nivea Funny Women award.

== Filmography ==
Key
†	Denotes projects that have not yet been released

=== Film ===
Year	Film	Role	Notes
2003	The N7	Jemma	Short film
2009	U Be Dead	FSS Scientist	TV film
2011	Swinging with the Finkels	Nurse Franklin	
2013	Scenes from Django Unchained	Django	Short film
2015	The Grid	Anna Pascal	Short film
2015	That's Me Mr. Fantastic	Sally	Short film
2016	Lights Out	Emma	
2017	Daipool	Doctor Rhiannon Llewellyn Jones	Short film
2019	Shazam!	Ms E.B. Glover	
2019	Jane		Short film
2020	Max Cloud	Sofia	
2021	A Castle for Christmas	Maisie	
2022	The Stranger in Our Bed	Paula	

=== Television ===
Year	Film	Role	Notes
2002	Night and Day	Jo Radcliffe	Episode: "Black Flowers"
2003	40	Caller	Mini-series
2004	Waking the Dead	Policewoman	Episode: "In Sight of the Lord"
2005	Sea of Souls	Angela Parker	Episode: "Omen"
2005	Doctors	Adeola Brooker	Episode: "In Custody"
2005	Footballers' Wives: Extra Time	Doctor Rogers	Episode: "Series 1, Episode 1"
2006	Casualty	Lin Colvin	Episode: "Out of the Past"
2007	Lewis	Receptionist	Episode: "Whom the Gods Would Destroy"
2007	Comedy Lab	Various roles	Episode: "Ain't It Funny Being Coloured"
2007	EastEnders	Midwife	3 episodes
2008	True Heroes	Jackie	Episode: "Grain Rescue"
2009	Big Top	Mother	Episode: "Boyfriend"
2009	Paradox	Sonia	Mini-series
2010	Ladies of Letters	Agabatha	Episode: "Series 2, Episode 10"
2011	Psychoville	Registrar	Episode: "Dinner Party"
2011	Life of Riley	Sumi	Episode: "The Bug"
2012	Holby City	Barbara Alcock	Recurring role, 3 episodes
2014	Finding Carter	Susan Sherman	Episode: Pilot""
2015	Uncle	DJ	Episode: "Series 2, Episode 6"
2015	Breaking Hollywood: One Actor at a Time	Claridia Fortune	Series regular
2016	Grime Town	Chivonne/Mardi	
2017	Halloween Comedy Shorts	Kehide/Taiwo	Episode: "Twin Thing"
2018	Kiri	Rochelle Akindele	Series regular
2019	Curfew	Jenny Donahue	Series regular
2019	Pandora	Rosa	Episode: "Hurricane"
2020	Death in Paradise	Precious Abellard	Episode: "Now You See Him, Now You Don't"
2020	On the Edge	Bisi	Episode: "BBW"
2020	I May Destroy You	Carrie	Recurring role, 2 episodes
2021	Line of Duty	Gail Vella	Recurring role, 3 episodes
2021	Stay Close	Simona	Mini-series
2022	The Sandman	Miranda Walker	Recurring role
2023	Blue Lights	PS Sandra Cliff	Recurring role
2023	Sex Education	Nicky Bowman	Recurring role
2023	Good Omens	Sitis	Episode: "The Clue"
2023	Payback	DI Jean Royce	8 episodes
2025	Midsomer Murders	Kimonie Bullit	Episode: "Death Strikes Three"

== Awards and nominations ==
Year	Award	Category	Nominated work	Result
2011	Screen Nation Award	Best Comedy Performance	Live at the Apollo	Won
2014	Aesthetica Short Film Festival Prize	Best Short Film (with Adam Recht)	Brit.i.am	Nominated
2014	Other Venice Film Festival Award	Abbot Award (with Adam Recht)	Brit.i.am	Won
2014	Red Dirt International Film Festival Award	Best Experimental/Art Film (with Adam Recht)	Brit.i.am	Won
2014	Seoul International Extreme-Short Image & Film Festival	Crazy Cell Phone (with Adam Recht)	Brit.i.am	Nominated
