= Taheen Modak =

British actor

- Born: Taheen Khalikh Modak; 1996 (age 29–30); Hounslow, London, United Kingdom
- Education: Bristol Old Vic Theatre School
- Years active: 2018–present

Taheen Khalikh Modak (born 1996) is a British actor. He is known for his roles in the ITV crime drama The Bay (2019–2021) and the Sky One miniseries Two Weeks to Live (2020).

== Early life ==
Modak was born in the West London Borough of Hounslow. He attended Isleworth and Syon School. He joined the National Youth Theatre and the RADA Youth Company. After taking a gap year, Modak enrolled at Bristol Old Vic Theatre School, going on to graduate from in 2018 with a Bachelor of Arts in Professional Acting.

== Career ==
In 2019, Modak made his professional stage debut in The American Clock at the Old Vic Theatre in London and began starring in the ITV crime drama The Bay as Ahmed "Med" Kharim, a main character he would play for the first two series. The following year, he starred as Jay in the Sky One and HBO Max comedy-drama miniseries Two Weeks to Live with Maisie Williams, Sian Clifford, and Mawaan Rizwan. He also appeared in an episode of the Van der Valk revival, also on ITV.

After leaving The Bay, Modak appeared in The Taxidermist's Daughter at Chichester Festival Theatre and returned to the Bristol Old Vic for Hamlet in 2022 and to London's Old Vic for Pygmalion in 2023. For his performance in the latter, Modak received an Ian Charleson Award nomination. In 2024, Modak has a role in the Channel 5 period drama The Hardacres.

== Filmography ==
=== Television and film ===
Year	Title	Role	Notes
2018	Beyond the Blade	The Boy	Episode: "The Boy"
2019	Doggerland	Musa	Short film
2019–2021	The Bay	Ahmed "Med" Kharim	Main role (series 1–2)
2020	Van der Valk	Zaim Jabara	Episode: "Only in Amsterdam"
2020	Ruthless	Jake	
2020	Two Weeks to Live	Jay	Miniseries
2024-present	The Hardacres	Callum Saunders	6 episodes

=== Web ===
Year	Title	Role	Notes
2020	Five Dates	Vinny	Interactive
2023	Ten Dates	Vinny	Interactive

== Stage ==
Year	Title	Role	Notes
2019	The American Clock	Lee 2	Old Vic Theatre, London
2022	The Taxidermist's Daughter	Harry	Chichester Festival Theatre, Chichester
2022	Hamlet	Laertes / Rosencrantz	Bristol Old Vic, Bristol
2023	Pygmalion	Freddy Eynsford-Hill	Old Vic Theatre, London
2024	Romeo & Juliet	Benvolio	Circle in the Square, Broadway NYC
