= The Bay (TV series) =

British crime drama series (2019-present)

- Genre: Crime drama
- Created by: Daragh Carville; Richard Clark
- Written by: Daragh Carville; Sally Tatchell; Kate O'Riordan; Furquan Akhtar
- Directed by: Lee Haven Jones; (series 1, episodes 1–3); Robert Quinn; (series 1, episodes 4–6, series 2 episodes 1–3); Julia Ford; (series 2, episodes 4–6); Shaun Evans; (series 5, episodes 1–3)
- Starring: Morven Christie; Marsha Thomason; Daniel Ryan; Lindsey Coulson; Taheen Modak; Erin Shanagher; Andrew Dowbiggin; Imogen King; Jonas Armstrong; Tracie Bennett; Chanel Cresswell; Louis Greatorex; Adam Long; Matthew McNulty; Art Parkinson; Joe Absolom; Wendy Kweh; Owen McDonnell; Steven Robertson; Sunetra Sarker; Sharon Small; Thomas Law; Jack Archer; James Cosmo
- Theme music composer: Samuel Sim
- Opening theme: The Bay – Samuel Sim (Feat. Storme)
- Country of origin: United Kingdom
- Original language: English
- No. of series: 5
- No. of episodes: 30

Production
- Executive producer: Catherine Oldfield
- Running time: 45 minutes
- Production company: Tall Story Pictures

Original release
- Network: ITV
- Release: 20 March 2019 – present

The Bay is a British crime drama and police procedural television series produced by Tall Story Pictures and distributed worldwide by ITV Studios Global Entertainment that first aired in March 2019 on ITV. The first two series starred Morven Christie as Lisa Armstrong, a Family Liaison Officer (FLO). Marsha Thomason took over the leading role from series three as DS Jenn Townsend. The first series centred around an investigation into teenage missing twins from a family living in Morecambe. The name of the series is derived from Morecambe Bay, an economically deprived area of north-west coastal England. The characters and cultural references are accurately linked to the difficulties of living in such a community, which in reality has suffered greatly under British governmental austerity programs implemented after the 2008 economic crisis.

The first series received an average of 7.2 million views across the six episodes. A second series of six episodes was confirmed on 4 May 2019 and it was originally planned for it to be broadcast in mid-2020. However, due to the COVID-19 pandemic, it was pushed back to early 2021; in January of that year, all six episodes were immediately made available on the ITV Hub, receiving an average of 7.9 million views.

A third series was filmed in the summer 2021. Christie decided to leave the show following production on the second series and Marsha Thomason was cast as the new lead, DS Jenn Townsend. After the last episode of series 3 was broadcast a fourth series was announced, and filming completed June 2022. It was renewed for a fifth series and filming began in July 2023. The fifth series aired in 2025.

== Cast ==
- Morven Christie as DS/DC Lisa Armstrong (series 1–2)
- Marsha Thomason as DS Jenn Townsend (series 3–present)
- Daniel Ryan as DI Tony Manning
- Erin Shanagher as DS Karen Hobson
- Andrew Dowbiggin as DS James Clarke
- Simon Manyonda as DS Alexander Stewart (series 1–2)
- Taheen Modak as DS Ahmed "Med" Kharim (series 1–2)
- Thomas Law as DC Eddie Martin (series 2–4)
- Steven Elder as ACC Robert Pearson (series 2 & 5)
- Olwen May as DC Lou McLaren (series 5-present)
- Lindsey Coulson as Penny Armstrong (series 1–2)
- Imogen King as Abbie Armstrong (series 1–2)
- Art Parkinson as Rob Armstrong (series 1–2)
- Kerrie Taylor as Ellen Manning (series 2-4)
- Barry Sloane as Chris Fischer (series 3–present)
- Georgia Scholes as Erin Fischer (series 3–present)
- David Carpenter as Conor Townsend (series 3–present)
- Emme Haynes as Maddie Townsend (series 3–present)
- Suzanne Packer as Anne Jackson (series 5-present)
- Tara Lynne O'Neill as Sinead Flanagan (series 5-present)

=== Series 1 (2019) ===
- Jonas Armstrong as Sean Meredith
- Roger Barclay as Councillor Hesketh
- Tracie Bennett as Margaret Foley
- Chanel Cresswell as Jess Meredith
- Ellie Duckles as Hanna Babakowski
- Louis Greatorex as Sam Hesketh
- Ciaran Griffiths as Lee Ward
- Philip Hill-Pearson as Ryan Foley
- Lucy Hillyard as Kelly Meredith
- Richard Huw as Tom Hayes
- Martina Laird as Bernie Ward
- Adam Long as Vincent Chapman/Victor Cook
- Liam McCheyne as Jake Meredith
- Matthew McNulty as Nick Mooney
- Jordan Mifsúd as Krzysztof Babakowski
- Darci Shaw as Holly Meredith
- Noah Valentine as Dylan Meredith

=== Series 2 (2021) ===
- Zaraah Abrahams as DS Emma Ryan
- Joe Absolom as Andy Warren
- Jack Archer as Jamie Marshbrook
- Sian Breckin as Madeline Hookway
- James Cosmo as Bill Bradwell
- Jade Greyul as Lateesha Kharim
- Adam Hussain as Josh Nubhai
- Amy James-Kelly as Grace Marshbrook
- Wendy Kweh as Lyn Chee
- Owen McDonnell as Frank Mercer
- Arian Nik as Theo Anvari
- Steven Robertson as Mark Bradwell
- Sunetra Sarker as Stella Bradwell
- Sharon Small as Rose Marshbrook
- Stephen Tompkinson as Stephen Marshbrook

=== Series 3 (2022) ===
- Zahra Ahmadi as Shazia Riaz
- Isabel Caswell as Molly Williams
- Nadeem Islam as Jamal Rahman
- Michael Karim as Adnan Rahman
- Gary Lewis as Vinnie Morrison
- Rina Mahoney as Mariam Rahman
- Brahmdeo Shannon Ramana as Saif Rahman
- Vincent Regan as Ray Conlon
- Paddy Rowan as Ritchie Ford
- Mark Stanley as Warren Pryce
- Ash Tandon as Kareem Riaz

=== Series 4 (2023) ===
- Joe Armstrong as Dean Metcalf
- Robert Beck as Len Reid
- Karl Davies as Carl McGregor
- Claire Goose as Jacqui Fischer
- Ian Puleston-Davies as Terry McGregor
- Tom Taylor as Matt Metcalf
- Eloise Thomas as Izzy Metcalf

=== Series 5 (2025) ===
- Leanne Best as Julie Ashworth
- Lucy Chambers as Poppy Richards
- Max Ferguson as Elliot Hayes
- Bastiano Ferrari as Kamran Hasanova
- Irvine Iqbal as Hassan Rashid
- Neil Maskell as Steve Dawson
- Sacha Parkinson as Lainey Gibson
- Lex Shrapnel as David Wallasey
- Ceallach Spellman as Bradley Dawson
- David Troughton as Tommy Campbell
- Stephen Wight as Craig Ashworth

== Episodes ==
Series	Episodes	Originally released	
Series	Episodes	First released	Last released
1	6	20 March 2019	24 April 2019
2	6	20 January 2021	24 February 2021
3	6	12 January 2022	16 February 2022
4	6	8 March 2023	12 April 2023
5	6	2 March 2025	11 March 2025

=== Series 1 (2019) ===
Detective Sergeant Lisa Armstrong (Morven Christie) is the mother of two children and working for the fictional West Lancashire Police Service as a Family Liaison Officer (FLO). She is called out on the case of two missing teenagers, only to find the married stepfather of the twins is someone with whom she had sex the night before in an alley behind a pub. Lisa's interaction with Sean (Jonas Armstrong) has been caught on CCTV, but she deletes the footage rather than coming clean and admitting to the one-night stand, complicating the investigation.

No. overall	No. in series	Directed by	Written by	Original release date	U.K. viewers (millions)
1	1	Lee Haven Jones	Daragh Carville	20 March 2019	7.43
The day after a girls' night out, Detective Sergeant Lisa Armstrong must investigate the disappearance of the teenaged Meredith twins, Dylan and Holly. She discovers that the stepfather, Sean Meredith, is the man with whom she had a one-night stand the previous night in the alley behind The Royal pub. Sean lacks an alibi for almost an hour of the night of the twins' disappearance, which includes his time with Lisa. He becomes the primary suspect and is subsequently placed under arrest. Dylan's body is found at the beach.
2	2	Lee Haven Jones	Daragh Carville	27 March 2019	7.40
After the wife of his mate Krzysztof provides an alibi, Sean is released on bail. The investigation turns to intellectually disabled Nick Mooney, seen at the youth club with Dylan and wanted for questioning. He arrives at the Meredith residence, where he is spooked by Lisa and runs off, but is chased and arrested; he is later released. Lisa's 15-year-old daughter, Abbie, flirts with 20-something Vincent; Vincent gives her a packet to pass on to schoolmate Wilco that turns out to be drugs. Holly's rucksack is discovered at the same beach where Dylan's body was found.
3	3	Lee Haven Jones	Daragh Carville	3 April 2019	7.23
Abbie gives the drugs to her friend Sam to pass on, but instead he flushes them. Sean, convinced Nick knows something about Holly's whereabouts, abducts him and, along with Ryan and Krzysztof, question him about Holly. CCTV from the train station shows that Holly met up with a man after buying tickets. Blood found near the beach is identified as Dylan's, while DNA from under Dylan's fingernails is found to be Holly's. Nick is dropped off from a van outside the hospital by two hooded men; he is bloodied and in critical condition.
4	4	Robert Quinn	Daragh Carville	10 April 2019	6.81
Sean turns himself in for the abduction of Nick; Ryan and Krzysztof are also arrested. The police find rolls of cash in Ryan's room, bagged the same way as the cash in Holly's rucksack. Abbie starts drug-running for Vincent; meanwhile, Abbie's brother, Rob, has become involved in a vandalism dare website, then is blackmailed over the footage. The police find Holly in an abandoned building, alive but highly distressed.
5	5	Robert Quinn	Kate O'Riordan & Daragh Carville	17 April 2019	6.82
Holly reveals she is pregnant. When Nick admits that Holly had confided in him about Dylan's death, he is arrested for obstructing justice. Rob attempts to pawn his grandmother's rings to pay off his blackmailer. He is arrested, and his involvement with the dare website is revealed. On Holly's direction, police search Sean's boat, where they find evidence of drug smuggling; Sean is arrested again. During police questioning, Holly confesses to killing Dylan. Lisa's partner finds and views the missing CCTV footage from The Royal and confronts Lisa over her actions. She confesses to DI Manning and is suspended.
6	6	Robert Quinn	Daragh Carville	24 April 2019	7.52
Holly is charged with Dylan's murder. Lisa follows Abbie to the West End and interrupts the drug deal; back home, Abbie opens up about her dealings with Vincent. The police find that Vincent is involved in a much larger drug smuggling ring that also involves Sean and Ryan; Vincent is arrested and Sean is encouraged to reveal the names of the ring leaders. The person responsible for Dylan's death makes an anonymous call to the police to try to free Holly. The call is traced to the killer. At the same time, Lisa learns who the father of Holly's baby is, what really occurred the night Dylan was killed, and how it was all connected.

=== Series 2 (2021) ===
Lisa's suspension is over but she has been demoted, whilst Med has been promoted. A solicitor is shot on his doorstep. The team investigates. To complicate Lisa's life further, her ex-husband Andy (Joe Absolom) reappears in Morecambe.

No. overall	No. in series	Directed by	Written by	Original release date	U.K. viewers (millions)
7	1	Robert Quinn	Daragh Carville	20 January 2021	7.86
After dealing with the consequences of the case involving the missing twins from last year, the now Detective Constable Lisa Armstrong is brought back into the fold to assist with the murder investigation in Morecambe of prominent solicitor Stephen Marshbrook. Marshbrook was murdered at his own doorstep with his 10-year-old son Oliver being the sole witness. Facing trauma from his experience, Oliver is too traumatised to talk, and is looked after by social care. The investigation turns to the family law firm, in which Lisa suspects everything is not as it seems. Early clues, including CCTV footage, point the police in the direction of a black van with stolen vehicle number plates. Eventually recovering from his trauma, Oliver draws a tattoo depicting a bird with two heads which he saw the killer have on his arm. Abbie gets a job at a local restaurant, and Lisa's ex-husband Andy reappears in Morecambe.
8	2	Robert Quinn	Daragh Carville	27 January 2021	7.85
Lisa is determined to ignore her ex-husband Andy's unexpected arrival the night before and throws herself into the case, uncovering a significant lead from her sole eyewitness. Oliver reveals he saw a boy on a bike leaving the scene before the shooting happened. The alleged boy is later revealed to actually be a girl, Cassie, who was tasked with delivering the gun and retrieve it afterwards. When brought in, she refuses to give up information while also berating the police. Lisa and her children attempt to shield themselves from her ex-husband, who manages to talk to Rob and a reluctant Abbie. The investigation reveals that Stephen Marshbrook had hired an accountant, Chris McGregor, to investigate some suspicious transactions. McGregor also reveals that Marshbrook had suspected it was someone in his own family who was responsible.
9	3	Robert Quinn	Daragh Carville	3 February 2021	7.79
As the team press on with the investigation, Lisa and Med dig deeper into the family and discover not all relationships with the victim were amicable. Lisa reluctantly lets her ex-husband Andy back into her and her children's lives, with protest from her mother. Questioning of Cassie finally leads to her revealing that she never met the man who had asked her to deliver the gun, and that she had received the orders over the phone. When family recollections of Stephen Marshbrook don't add up, Lisa returns to question his daughter, Grace, who notably reveals she took the blame for a car theft that Jamie actually had committed, and that she had been ordered to do by her father to protect Jamie's record. Med investigates unused housing properties after a lead discovered by Lisa. They all share a common owner, Breakwater, which one construction worker reveals no knowledge of, other than orders to barricade a building's windows. Simultaneously as Lisa, Bill Bradwell and Rose Marshbrook discover that Jamie has gone missing, Med is hit by a vehicle and left seriously injured.
10	4	Julia Ford	Daragh Carville	10 February 2021	7.96
Paramedics declare Med dead on scene, and Manning places Lisa in charge as family liaison to the Marshbrook family. The team are forced to accept the help of a new unit from the Greater Manchester Police, who conducts their own investigation into Med's death while the team continues the investigation into the Marshbrook case. The team's investigation digs deeper into who the mystery woman was whom Stephen Marshbrook met at a hotel, with members conducting a surveillance operation until she shows up. The mystery woman turns out to be Madeleine Hookway, who reveals that Oliver is her son. The investigation further uncovers that Hookway had been discredited as a terrible mother, and that Stephen had taken care of Oliver's birth certificate. Jamie Marshbrook turns up explaining that he and his boyfriend just needed time away from Morecambe. Jamie is also questioned about his apparent presence in Morecambe despite the claim he was still abroad until Stephen's death.
11	5	Julia Ford	Sally Tatchell	17 February 2021	7.92
Bill Bradwell is brought in for questioning regarding Breakwater and Comber Development, and that the deals were signed knowing what they regarded. Manning confronts Bradwell with papers signed by him that acknowledges Liam Spoldon as Breakwater's CEO, despite the fact that the real Spoldon died sixteen years ago. Bradwell expresses disapproval of how the papers were obtained, causing his attorney to end the questioning. Bradwell then tells the family that the law firm was in trouble and he had to take desperate measures to save it. He also explains that he kept Mark out of the loop to save him. In a desperate attempt to legally clarify the document's usage from Lyn Chee's flash drive, Lisa attempts to convince her to testify anonymously about the documents, but she refuses. Rob's friend, Josh, confesses that he has feelings for him. Manning attempts to drink away his sorrow, due to his wife wanting a divorce; and the man with the distinctive tattoo is arrested in Manchester.
12	6	Julia Ford	Daragh Carville	24 February 2021	8.38
The Russian, Viktor Zima, admits to killing Stephen. He further explains that he was paid by a man in his 20s–40s in a bar. Further investigation reveals that man is Frank Mercer, who, along with Grace, Rose and Mark Marshbrook, are brought in for further questioning. Grace reveals that she got her job at the scrapyard via Rose, who had put in a good word with Mercer. Rose reveals that she was having an affair with Mercer, but that she never would leave Stephen. She also explains that Frank had ideas of them and Oliver moving away, something she brands as a fantasy on his side. Mercer admits to ordering the hit on Stephen during questioning and that he had urged Rose to break up with Stephen. While Mercer is charged for ordering the hit on Stephen, Rose is issued a caution after admitting having made the suspicious transactions at Bradwell and Marshbrook. After some convincing, she decides to testify regarding the company's documents. Lisa's mother, Penny, makes a discovery about Andy, which she confronts him about. It's revealed that he had remarried and fathered another child after moving away from Morecambe. But instead of being willing to explain it to Rob and Abbie, he decides to leave Morecambe.

=== Series 3 (2022) ===
DS Townsend (Marsha Thomason) is immediately thrown into the deep end when a body is found in the bay on her first day in the job. She must get under the skin of a grieving and complicated family if she has any chance of solving the premature death of an aspiring young boxer.

No. overall	No. in series	Directed by	Written by	Original release date	U.K. viewers (millions)
13	1	Faye Gilbert	Daragh Carville & Furquan Akhtar	12 January 2022	6.46
New detective DS Jenn Townsend (Marsha Thomason) joins the team and is immediately thrown into the deep end when the body of aspiring boxer Saif Rahman is found in the bay during her first day on the job. Together with Karen Hobson (Erin Shanagher), Townsend learns that Saif followed his schedule as usual from his job to going to the gym, while his family and friends describe him as a good person. While taking a break, Townsend spots a girl wandering near the family residence, whom she learns was Saif’s girlfriend, Molly Williams, whom the family didn’t know about. Molly tells her that Saif could have a temper and that he fought a gang outside a new club, Level. DS James Clarke gains the surveillance footage, and the police identify one of the perpetrators as drug dealer Jordon Rooney, who is later arrested. Manning receives a letter of divorce, and Townsend and her family settle into their new home.
14	2	Faye Gilbert	Story by : Daragh Carville & Furquan Akhtar; Teleplay by : Daragh Carville	19 January 2022	6.19
Manning and Clarke question Rooney about the gang up on Saif, but he remains uncooperative, but slips that he’s glad he’s dead. Townsend and Hobson face a family conflict when Jamal refuses to let Saif’s body go through post mortem. However, Adnan persuades them to accept it. The coroner concludes that Saif died of head injuries. Townsend faces another hurdle when her stepdaughter Erin is brought in as a witness to an argument between Saif and Molly at a party. She leaves herself out of the questioning, but observes it through the one-way mirror. Molly identifies the people who were with Rooney, but they provide him with an alibi for the night Saif died. The police get a warrant to search the gym Saif went to, discovering his phone and traces of blood in the back. Manning learns that Adnan lied about his whereabouts, which Townsend learns was because he feared he wouldn’t be believed. Adnan later gets into a fight with Rooney at the Level club and punches Townsend by accident. He manages to sneak away when the police apprehend Rooney, arriving at a makeshift memorial for Saif, which he vandalises in a fit of rage.
15	3	Faye Gilbert	Story by : Daragh Carville & Furquan Akhtar; Teleplay by : Daragh Carville	26 January 2022	5.59
Forensics reveal traces from a carpet on Saif. Manning has the team check the alibis of the people of interest in the case, including Adnan, Kareem and Ray Conlon. Adnan is checked out, but Manning remains bitter that he lied to the police, and Kareem and Conlon are also checked out. Post mortem also reveals that Saif had traces of steroids in his system, which Clarke and Eddie Martin confront his coach, Warren Pryce, about, but he denies any knowledge of it. A participant on the junior team, Shirin Persuad, explains that Saif seemed uneasy as he left the gym. The club manager, Vinnie Morrison, later decides to talk to the police, and shares his suspicions about Saif. Pryce later admits that he helped Saif with steroids, but that it was Saif’s idea. Manning and the team deduce a likely motive being pressure on Saif for an upcoming boxing match in Salford. Adnan decides to help his family, but his drunken mother berates him for failing to develop like Saif. The carpet traces found on Saif are later identified to belong to several car models, including a black BMW 5-Series with a white stripe recorded by several security cameras. While clearing out a van, Adnan is confronted by Rooney. He manages to escape, but the two end up in a struggle. Adnan manages to get the upper hand and stabs Rooney with the knife he was armed with.
16	4	Faye Gilbert	Story by : Daragh Carville & Furquan Akhtar; Teleplay by : Furquan Akhtar	2 February 2022	5.23
Adnan calls an ambulance for Rooney while watching them treat him from afar. Manning focuses the investigation on the bookmakers for the boxing match. It’s also discovered that Saif’s odds fell rapidly just before the match. Clarke learns that Vinnie Morrison also bet on Saif, while an older woman reveals she was asked to bet against Saif by a middle-aged Indian woman. Several more people give the same story, prompting Jenn to ask around in the family. Saif’s funeral is held and Adnan decides to reconcile with Jamal. Eddie Martin finds CCTV footage that puts holes in Kareem’s alibi, with him being absent for an hour before actually leaving work. Jenn learns from Kareem that he had purchased food before returning. DI Kate Radford leads the arrest on Adnan, straining Jenn’s standing for Mariam. In an act to redeem herself, she arranges a phone call with Adnan for her. Jenn questions Shazia, who explains that it was Kareem’s idea and that Saif agreed to it. Two of Rooney’s friends beat Jamal, but are fended off by Ray Conlon. Jenn receives alarming news that her son has gone missing.
17	5	Nicole Volavka	Furquan Akhtar & Daragh Carville	9 February 2022	5.53
Jenn searches frantically for her missing son, Conor, into the morning, when she finally decides to report him missing. She also steps away from the Rahman investigation until her son is found. It’s revealed that Conor went to his father in Manchester, who immediately returns him to Morecambe. Conor gets to spend a day with him in order to cheer himself up. Kareem is brought in for questioning on the counts of fraud, but is later released on bail. Shazia also reveals the truth to Mariam, who refuses to believe that Saif would agree to it. Vince Morrison decides to close down his boxing club, to much protest from Pryce. Jamal informs Adnan about Kareem, who in turn reaches out to Jenn and gives Kareem an alibi for the night of Saif’s murder. With every person of interest ruled out, the investigation arrives at a standstill. Hope is renewed when Saif’s phone is analysed, with traces of blood found inside it. Manning puts Clarke in charge of starting from the beginning, starting with the last person to see Saif alive, Shirin Persaud.
18	6	Nicole Volavka	Story by : Daragh Carville & Furquan Akhtar; Teleplay by : Daragh Carville	16 February 2022	6.04
With her family situation deteriorating, Jenn begins to consider moving out of her new partner, Chris', house, to much objection from him and her children. Shirin is questioned again and remains firm on that she doesn't know anything beyond seeing Saif depart through the back. Jenn suggests that the police look through Saif's friend list from his funeral and find someone who sticks out. She asks Erin, Chris' daughter, for help, who remarks that Molly's brother, Kyle, wasn't as close to Saif as he had claimed. Kyle attempts to escape as Jenn visits his family gathering. Both him and Saif's sparring partner Ritchie Ford's alibis begin to fracture as they’re both brought in for questioning, with Ritchie's blood being identified to have been inside Saif's phone. Kyle eventually buckles and explains that he had joined Ritchie to talk to Saif behind the club. Ritchie admits that his friendship with Saif had deteriorated and they had in effect become rivals. He had asked Shirin to lure Saif to the back of the gym so he could teach him a lesson, thinking him to be arrogant. Ritchie and Said fought while Kyle subsequently bludgeoned him to death. His father then arrived to help him get rid of the body, explaining the blood in the BMW's boot and its subsequent repainting at their garage. Following the investigation's closure, the Rahmans visit Adnan in prison, while Jenn decides for her and her children to stay with Chris and Erin.

=== Series 4 (2023) ===
The series premiered on ITV1 and ITVX on 8 March 2023. The series was available to stream as a boxset on ITVX.

No. overall	No. in series	Directed by	Written by	Original release date	U.K. viewers (millions)
19	1	Sebastian Godwin	Daragh Carville	8 March 2023	5.02
Jenn is working late when an emergency is called in. Upon arriving on the scene, she finds herself dealing with the Metcalf family, who has lost their mother in a house fire. As the investigation gets underway, the fire brigade suspects the fire was deliberate. With no place to call home, the police send the Metcalfs to a secure location until their housing situation can be resolved. The father, Dean, makes the police aware of break-ins at his company spanning the last few months, and they also speak to his only full-time employee, Mal Haworth, who has a history of a bad temper. Both Mal and other potential leads are quickly ruled out, but something Dean said about the family not being meant to be at home the night of the fire, raises Jenn's suspicions. On the personal front, Conor has entered a romantic relationship, and Chris's ex-wife makes a surprise visit.
20	2	Sebastian Godwin	Daragh Carville	15 March 2023	4.87
The Morecambe community rallies around the grieving Metcalf family. The police questioned Izzy Metcalf's boyfriend Brandon about his history and Izzy, revealing that she had a history of inciting fights, including one where her brother Matt had to intervene. Digital evidence suggests that someone was threatening Beth Metcalf, but she never disclosed to Dean who it was. Further evidence suggests that Beth was unhappy in the marriage and wanted a divorce, even going to see a marriage councillor. Jenn also learns Dean is in debt to a loan shark after renting equipment for a work contract. Clarkie apprehends Ozzie Peel, a gang member who aided the police in locking up a gang, who also reveals he saw a car near the Metcalf home the night of the fire. Jenn's questions about Dean and Beth's marriage fire him up, and when she's gone, he loses his temper in front of the children. Chris worries when Erin sneaks off with her boyfriend, landing Conor in the line of fire, who is trying to cover for her. Maddie grows worried when fellow student Lewis acts threatening around her but hides it from teachers.
21	3	Sebastian Godwin	Caroline Carver	22 March 2023	5.53
The Metcalfs are forced to move from their AirBnB following Dean's outburst. Dean meanwhile rushes to find a way to get back to work, while Manning and Martin question loanshark Len Reid about his dealings with Dean, which later causes Reid to visit his workplace, only to hand his message through Mal. Jenn learns that a complaint was made against Beth during the COVID-19 pandemic by a patient's daughter, which gives the police a new suspect. Beth's brother Alex returns to Morecambe with their parents, much to Dean's displeasure. Lewis' threats against Maddie turn to vicious bullying, and she reluctantly confides in Conor, who pledges not to tell their mother. Chris worries more about Erin when he finds a pregnancy test in her garbage. Someone heads to Dean's business at night and sets the equipment alight.
22	4	David Allain	Daragh Carville	29 March 2023	5.32
The arson of Dean's equipment upsets him, and he tries to distract himself by aiming to return to work regardless of what the police recommend. Jenn speaks to the daughter of Johnny Coombes, Carol Jennings, who filed a complaint against Beth. Despite Carol claiming there was no Grudge against Beth, Jenn suspects there was due to her continued bitterness. Manning's personal life collides with work when his ex-wife's new boyfriend comes to the station and fights him after he refuses to let her alone. Eddie reveals to Clarkie and Karen that he's to become a father but is concurrently worried about the cuts. The police clear Alex despite Dean's suspicions about his involvement in the arson. Jenn clashes with Jacqui, Chris' ex-wife, about how to look after Erin, while Conor tries to confront Lewis. Maddie begins to see signs that Lewis is struggling at home. Upon returning to work, Dean and his crew discover skeletal remains at the construction site.
23	5	David Allain	Furquan Akhtar	5 April 2023	5.55
The skeletal remains are analyzed by police, and the victim is identified as Daniel Hickson and looks to have been executed on-site at least 20 years prior. Hickson worked for the council planning office and was responsible for several scams, and he had been assumed missing. Having investigated the case himself, Manning begins to doubt if he did what he could at the time. Dean confronts Alex after learning that Izzy lent him money. Eddie identifies Carol Jennings as having sent hate messages to Beth before her death, but she denies sending a last message on the day of her death. Surveillance cameras at an internet cafe determine that Alex sent the last message and that he is being questioned. Investigation into the construction site reveals that it was in limbo for a long time before a final bid involving the McGregors and Dean's company in the running and a mysterious company. Conor tells Chris about Maddie's bullying, while Erin's boyfriend breaks up with her. Jenn makes a stand against Jacqui, but just as she does, a brick is thrown through their window.
24	6	David Allain	Daragh Carville	12 April 2023	6.00
Doorbell cameras from neighbouring houses prove that Lewis threw the brick through the window, and Jenn becomes determined to bring him in. Still, Manning advises against it for a conflict of interest. The mysterious company that participated in the bid for the construction site is registered to Terry McGregor's wife, who is charged with fraud but quickly released due to lack of evidence. Lewis and Terry are brought in, where Lewis confesses to the fire, which his friend Yousef aided him in. His motives are revealed to gain recognition from Terry, who had looked down on him. Additionally, Terry's son Carl implicated him in the property fire, and Terry confesses to having aided his father in burying Daniel Hickson. It's also revealed that Lewis' threats and bullying against Maddie were due to him believing that she had overheard him and Yousef discussing the fire. Erin decides to live with her mother after she deems Chris' house too dangerous for Erin. However, when she notices how dismissive she is of her well-being, Erin decides to move back in with Chris and Jenn.

=== Series 5 (2025) ===
No. overall	No. in series	Directed by	Written by	Original release date	U.K. viewers (millions)
25	1	Shaun Evans	Daragh Carville	2 March 2025	4.95
Jenn returns to work following her father's death just as the team investigate the discovery of Hannah Dawson's body in a canal lock at Glasson Dock. With staff shortages hurting the team, they receive help from detective Lou McClaren. Jenn and Karen learn from Hannah's family that she used to self-harm before attending therapy, and that her relationship with boyfriend Cal O'Neill was rocky, according to her dorm mates. But as Cal's presence is further questioned, they learn from his workplace that he hasn't met up in a while and a search for him and any other potential witnesses, is launched. Clarkie and a search crew find his car and begin to search the beach and rocky surroundings for Cal. Further down the straight, they discover Cal's body and that he is barely alive. The staff shortages has notably led to Eddie's departure, while Clarkie objects to the overtime payment scheme, much to the frustration of his colleagues. Jenn deals with the surprise arrival of her mother at her family's home, despite them not having the capacity to keep her with them.
26	2	Shaun Evans	Daragh Carville	3 March 2025	4.79
Cal is rushed to the hospital, while forensics reports a set of footprints in the mud near where his car was left. Furthermore, his injuries indicate that he was in a struggle. Jenn and Karen speak to Hannah's therapist, who reveals she was on medication and felt unsafe around her mother, Julie's, new husband, Craig. Jenn arrests Julie's ex-husband Steve after spotting muddy sneakers, but forensics later report that they aren't a match for Cal's attack scene. Jenn speaks to the grandfather, Tommy, who reveals further details about Hannah's struggles and the contempt for Steve, which is overheard by Hannah's brother, Bradley. Some time later he and Steve confront Craig about speaking to the police, which leads to an altercation between the two. Lou provides the team with street camera footage which shows Craig's car near Lancaster at the time of Hannah's death. Jenn and her family continue to face increasing challenges in their lives, which is only further exasperated with her mother’s newfound presence in their daily lives.
27	3	Shaun Evans	Caroline Carver	4 March 2025	4.50
Tommy threatens to expose Craig and his money scheme, but he silences him on who Julie would rather believe. Steve approaches Jenn about a taxi fair that Craig didn't pay for and she later confronts him about the Lancaster street cameras, which he acknowledges and explains that he had to deliver some keys. Though hesitantly accepted by the police, Lou later receives a confirmation about Craig's delivery. The autopsy results of Hannah are returned and shows signs of the chemical substance TBP, with some traces also found on Cal. A vigil for Hannah takes place at her university, which later leads to a confrontation between police and protestors. In the chaos, Karen tries to intervene in an arrest of a girl, only to be knocked down. She later learns that the arresting officer has filed a complaint against her. Jenn deduces that Hannah and Cal could have been at the same power plant that her brother works at. Conor and his boyfriend face challenges in their relationship as they prepare to go to separate universities.
28	4	Waris Islam	Caroline Carver	9 March 2025	5.08
Manning pushes for security clearance at the power plant Bradley works at, in order for the team to both question Bradley and inspect how Hannah and Cal could have been exposed to TBP. But in the process he takes shortcuts to obtain the security clearance, which puts him at odds with ACC Pearson. Jenn and Karen learn from Bradley that Hannah never was present at the plant and if she was, she wasn't let in by him. However, Clarkie obtains CCTV footage that confirms Hannah was at the plant for a tour with her class. Despite this finding, the team learns from fellow student Elliot that she was never exposed to TBP during the tour. Lou informs Manning that Cal has died of his injuries. While questioning Steve, Jenn is almost kissed by him after opening up about her father's death. Manning pushes for Karen to apologise to the officer from the vigil, while also buckling from the pressure of the job. On the way to speak to Pearson, he crashes with a lorry.
29	5	Waris Islam	Evan Placey	10 March 2025	5.06
Manning is hospitalised and is gradually stabilised, but is informed that stress has caused a disruption in his heartbeat pattern. Additionally, his doctor informs him to ease off his work and find a less stressful routine. Meanwhile, DCI Josephine Hardy is called to substitute in Manning's absence, whose leadership style becomes challenging for the team. Karen steps in to handle Erin's arrest for theft, which results in her being committed to community service. Clarkie looks into Cal's unusual delivery route pattern and his exposure to TBP from barrels he transported. Lou determines a pattern of burglaries which happened sometime after Craig laid carpets at said locations, which leads to his arrest and subsequent confession. Tommy attempts to turn himself in for not taking action despite suspicions of Craig's scheme, but Jenn explains that he hasn't committed any offences despite this. The pressure of her personal life and rapid changes at work sends Jenn over the edge when she finally reunites with her family, realising that she isn't fully over her father's death.
30	6	Waris Islam	Daragh Carville	11 March 2025	4.98
Craig visits Julie despite his parole denying him this right, in order to apologise before leaving again. Patrol officers recover Hannah's laptop from someone who found it at a rubbish tip and Lou manages to extract the data from it, which points them to a table of contents. The details are specified by Elliot after they learn he chatted with Hannah despite denying this earlier. The environmental office confirms the contents to stem from an unreleased report about pollution in the bay, which Hannah and Cal measured. A Wi-Fi connection leads them back to her professor, David Wallasey, who confesses to killing her in a panic. Wallasey had downplayed the contents in a consulting report for Vita Textiles, who also ordered the hit on Cal. Jenn delivers the news to Hannah's family, while also reconnecting with her own. Karen is suspended after failing to issue an apology to the officer from the vigil, while Manning returns home and takes leave per doctor's orders.

== Production ==
The series has been labelled the "Northern Broadchurch", or the "New Broadchurch" after a similar British crime drama called Broadchurch starring Olivia Colman and David Tennant. The writer of the series, Daragh Carville, is originally from Northern Ireland, but wanted to set something where he now lives.

I wanted to write something that's set where I have lived for the last 10 years. It's an interesting place and beautiful but it's also a place with problems. It's suffered a great deal with austerity.

The series was shot in and around Morecambe, particularly on the beaches and in the Winter Gardens, where writer Daragh Carville stated that the people of Morecambe took quite an interest in the show and were keen to see that they, and their town, were not misrepresented on screen. Other scenes were also shot in Manchester, Whitehaven, and Grange-over-Sands.

== Reception ==
=== Series 1 (2019) ===
The Daily Telegraph rated the first and second episodes in the series with three stars out of five, and whilst acknowledging the lead character's portrayal, described the series as "Lancashire's riposte to/total rip-off of Broadchurch". The Independent also awarded it three stars out of five, labelling the series as having texture, but that the characterisation of the conundrum faced by DS Armstrong as being "cold". The Guardian was more positive and gave it four stars out of five stating "Suspects and police officers with shared secrets? Check. Information wilfully withheld by the writer? Check. Will you be hooked? Check."

Katrina Williams, writing in the Glasgow Guardian, highlighted the high standard of production amidst the formulaic setting of the crime drama and noted that "I wasn't desperate for the next episode, but the first episode still managed to strike my interest".

=== Series 2 (2021) ===
Dominic Maxwell, reviewing for The Times, gave the first episode of the second series four stars out of five, commenting that the episode was "a solid, finely crafted detective thriller" and it "could just be the downbeat yet propulsive distraction we need right now". Rachel Sigee, reviewing for the newspaper i, also gave it four stars praising Christie and suggesting "This engrossing first episode scattered enough clues [...] to set up an intriguing thriller". Anita Singh, reviewing for The Daily Telegraph, rated the first episode three stars out of five calling it "a refreshing return for this bracing seaside cop show", while Sean O'Grady for The Independent was more critical, commenting that "though the actors put in some commendable performances, they are all lumbered with carelessly constructed, barely two-dimensional characters" and gave it two stars.
