= Jonas Armstrong =

Irish actor (born 1981)

- Born: 1 January 1981 (age 45); Dublin, Ireland
- Education: Royal Academy of Dramatic Art (BA)
- Occupation: Actor
- Years active: 2003–present

Jonas Armstrong (born 1 January 1981) is an Irish actor, based in the United Kingdom. He rose to prominence playing the title character on the BBC's Robin Hood (2006–2009). He has since appeared in miniseries such as Dark Angel (2016), Troy: Fall of a City (2018), The Drowning, Hollington Drive (both 2021), After the Flood and Coma (both 2024), and starred as Sean Meredith on the first season of ITV's The Bay (2019). Armstrong won critical acclaim for his portrayal of Barry Bennell in the 2022 television film Floodlights. His feature film credits include Book of Blood (2009), Twenty8k (2012), and Edge of Tomorrow (2014).

== Early life ==
Armstrong was born in Dublin, Ireland on New Year's Day, 1981. He spent his early years in Ireland before his family moved to Lytham St Annes when he was six. He attended Arnold School and later won a place at RADA, from where he graduated in 2003 with a BA in acting.

== Career ==
=== 2003–2008: Early roles and Robin Hood ===
Armstrong made his professional debut in 2003, playing rookie schoolteacher Derek Meadle in Quartermaine's Terms at Northampton's Royal Theatre. His performance was roundly praised by critics, who felt that he provided crucial comic relief against the story's more serious elements. He then appeared as Anthony Millington in several episodes of the Channel 4 comedy-drama series Teachers (2004), and again on Channel 4 in the following year's crime drama The Ghost Squad, where he played a thrill-seeking detective assigned to expose police corruption.

Armstrong's first major television role came in October 2006 when he began playing Robin of Locksley in the BBC One action-adventure series Robin Hood. Though he initially faced criticism for his slight build and "boyband" good looks, his performance later drew praise, with IGN calling it "brilliant". During filming of the second series, Armstrong broke a metatarsal bone in his foot during a staged fight sequence. In August 2008, he confirmed that he would be leaving Robin Hood the following year at the end of its third season, commenting in his statement that he was "looking for new challenges"; the BBC responded by saying that Armstrong would be "desperately missed". The show was subsequently not renewed for a fourth series.

=== 2009–present: Film and television work ===
In 2009, Armstrong starred in the lead role of Simon McNeal in the horror film Book of Blood, based on a short story by Clive Barker. Next, he guest-starred in an episode of the BBC drama series The Street, winning praise for his "sterling work" as TA soldier Private Nick Calshaw, who returns from Afghanistan with life-changing injuries. That same year, he read four CBeebies Bedtime Stories for the channel's "Bedtime Hour" segment.

Between 2011 and 2012, Armstrong had roles in a succession of television crime dramas, such as The Field of Blood, Prisoners' Wives, and Hit & Miss. His portrayal of a university student-turned-Nazi impersonator in the 2014 feature film Walking with the Enemy was lauded by critics, with Paste Magazine writing, "Armstrong is [Enemy's] moral force, and he gives [the] film a forward-leaning energy; he's the character that a viewer questions whether he or she would have the guts to be. It's a performance rooted in righteousness, but Armstrong also taps into the inner conflict of a swallowed power dynamic—he locates both the lust and queasiness of playing a Gestapo officer, and having to own that guise, and all the action it entails, at inopportune times and at a moment's notice". That same year, he played the supporting role of Skinner in the big-budget action adventure film Edge of Tomorrow, which Variety called a "cleverly crafted and propulsively executed sci-fi thriller". Speaking of the opportunity to work with co-star Tom Cruise, Armstrong said at the time, "If I thought two years ago I'd be working with probably the biggest film star on the planet I would have said 'never', but it was great [...] He was really supportive and generous [and] it was an absolute privilege to work with him". In November 2013, Armstrong received a "Stars on Horizon" award at the Fort Lauderdale International Film Festival.

On the fourth and fifth seasons of BBC Two's Ripper Street (both 2016), a fictional dramatisation of the aftermath of the Whitechapel murders, Armstrong played the recurring role of serial killer Nathaniel Croker, with Den of Geek commenting—in their review of the fifth season's third episode—that he played the part "beautifully", adding: "It's an impressive feat for a supporting character to [take over] so completely that the main plot is barely missed".

In 2018, Armstrong earned strong notices for his work in two projects: firstly, his portrayal of a Spartan king in the Netflix historical miniseries Troy: Fall of a City, and then for his "convincingly exasperated" caricature of Bob Geldof in an episode of the Sky Arts anthology series Urban Myths. The following year, he co-starred as Sean Meredith, a fisherman embroiled in the disappearance of his teenage twins, on the first season of the ITV crime mystery series The Bay. Next, he starred in The Drowning, a four-part psychological thriller that aired on Channel 5 in February 2021, and appeared as a grieving father who embarks on an extramarital affair in the ITV miniseries Hollington Drive (also 2021).

Armstrong's portrayal of real-life convicted sex offender Barry Bennell in the 2022 television film Floodlights was particularly well received by critics. Writing for The Daily Telegraph, Benji Wilson said, "Armstrong [has] quietly been turning in performances of subtlety and power since he shot to fame [with] Robin Hood [...] Here he was oleaginous and creepy, all simmering, smiling menace"; while Dan Einav of the Financial Times felt that "Armstrong's ability to slip between affable mentor and depraved predator is key to his remarkably convincing performance". Speaking to Metro shortly before the film's premiere on BBC Two, Armstrong admitted to having been reluctant to take the part: "It kind of made me feel a bit sick [but] I had a good discussion with my agent and then I decided yeah, I'm going to go for this [to] raise awareness for people who might still be suffering". He added, "I kind of had to take myself back and put the project forward before myself as a performer, as an actor, if that makes sense. I thought, without sounding cliché, but this story needs to be told, and if I can help facilitate that in any way, shape or form, I'm all for it".

In the six-part mystery thriller series After the Flood (2024), Armstrong starred as Lee Ellison, a man whose mysterious past is unveiled when he rescues a baby from the River Tees. His next role was that of a vengeful gangster, which the Yorkshire Evening Post felt he played with "nerve-bulging intensity", in the four-part miniseries Coma, which debuted on Channel 5 in March 2024.

== Filmography ==
=== Film ===
Year	Film	Role	Notes
2009	Book of Blood	Simon McNeal	
2011	Rage of the Yeti	Bill	Television film
2011	Life Outside	Daniel	Television film
2012	Twenty8k	Clint O'Connor	
2013	Walking with the Enemy	Elek Cohen	
2013	The Whale	Owen Chase	Television film
2014	Edge of Tomorrow	Skinner	
2019	Boiling Point	Freeman	Short
2022	Floodlights	Barry Bennell	Television film
2022	Look the Other Way and Run	Lee	
2022	Three Day Millionaire	Mr. Graham	
2023	Hyem	'Little' John Arckle	Short
TBA	The Enforcer	TBA	Short

=== Television ===
Year	Film	Role	Notes
2004	Teachers	Anthony Millington	Recurring (series 4)
2005	The Ghost Squad	Pete Maitland	Series regular
2006	Losing Gemma	Steve	Main role
2006–2009	Robin Hood	Robin Hood	Main role
2009	The Street	Nick Calshaw	Recurring (series 3)
2010	Agatha Christie's Marple	Anthony Cade	Episode: "The Secret of Chimneys"
2011	The Field of Blood	Terry Hewitt	Recurring (series 1)
2011	The Body Farm	Nick Warner	Episode #1.5
2012	Prisoners' Wives	Steve Roscoe	Recurring (series 1)
2012	Hit & Miss	Ben	Main role
2015	The Dovekeepers	Yoav	Main role
2016	Line of Duty	Joe Nash	Recurring (series 3)
2016	Dark Angel	Joe Nattrass	Main role
2016	Ripper Street	Nathaniel Croker	Recurring (series 4–5)
2018	Troy: Fall of a City	Menelaus	Main role
2018	Urban Myths	Bob Geldof	Episode: "Backstage at Live Aid"
2019	Death in Paradise	Dylan Shepherd	Episode: "Murder Most Animal"
2019	The Bay	Sean Meredith	Series regular (season 1)
2020	Ghost Seekers	Finn Coleman	Main role
2021	The Drowning	Jason	Main role
2021	Hollington Drive	Gareth Boyd	Main role
2022	Strike	Saul Morris	Series regular (season 5)
2023	Boat Story	Arthur	2 episodes
2024	After the Flood	Lee	Main role
2024	Coma	Paul	Main role

== Theatre ==
Year	Film	Role	Notes
2003	Quartermaine's Terms	Derek Meadle	Royal Theatre
2004	The Skin of Our Teeth	Henry	Young Vic
2005	Rutherford and Son	Richard	Royal Exchange
