= Suspect (TV series) =

- Genre: Crime drama
- Based on: Forhøret by Christoffer Boe
- Written by: Matt Baker (series 1); Joy Wilkinson & David Allison (series 2)
- Directed by: Dries Vos (series 1); Carolina Giammetta (series 2)
- Starring: James Nesbitt; Sacha Dhawan; Anne-Marie Duff; Sam Heughan; Niamh Algar; Richard E. Grant; Ben Miller; Antonia Thomas; Joely Richardson
- Country of origin: United Kingdom
- Original language: English
- No. of series: 2
- No. of episodes: 16

Production
- Executive producers: Walter Iuzzolino; Jo McGrath
- Producer: Ed King
- Running time: 30 minutes
- Production companies: Eagle Eye Drama; Fremantle

Original release
- Network: Channel 4
- Release: 19 June 2022 – present

Suspect is a British crime drama television series. Adapted by Matt Baker, it is based on the Danish series Face to Face (Danish: Forhøret), which was created by Christoffer Boe. Suspect premiered on 19 June 2022 on Channel 4.

It was commissioned for a second series, with Baker being replaced as writer by Joy Wilkinson and David Allison. That series began broadcast on 17 July 2024.

== Premise ==
Detective Danny Frater, after finding his daughter's body in the mortuary, presumably by suicide, retraces her final days to discover what happened, interviewing a range of her acquaintances. In series 2, a hypnotherapist is visited by a man who says he wants to quit smoking. Under hypnosis, he says he kills girls and she must stop him.

== Cast ==
=== Series 1 ===
- James Nesbitt as Danny Frater
- Sacha Dhawan as Jaisal
- Anne-Marie Duff as Susannah
- Sam Heughan as Ryan
- Niamh Algar as Nicola
- Richard E. Grant as Harry
- Ben Miller as Richard
- Antonia Thomas as Maia
- Joely Richardson as Jackie Sowden
- Imogen King as Christina

=== Series 2 ===
- Anne-Marie Duff as Dr Susannah Newman
- Dominic Cooper as Jon Fallow
- Ben Miller as Detective Superintendent Richard Groves
- Tamsin Greig as Natasha Groves
- Vinette Robinson as Louisa McAdams
- Eddie Marsan as Alistair Underwood
- Céline Buckens as Sapphire
- Nicholas Pinnock as Joseph
- Gina McKee as Kate
- Ricky Champ as Carter
- Liam Smith as Clive

== Production ==
The first series was commissioned by Channel 4 in September 2021. Filming for the series began the following month, and generated slight controversy as customers were turned away while filming was undertaken at a Texaco in Vauxhall during the fuel crisis.

== Episodes ==
=== Series 1 ===
No.	Title	Directed by	Written by	Original release date	UK viewers (millions)
1	"Jackie"	Dries Vos	Matt Baker	19 June 2022	N/A
2	"Nicola"	Dries Vos	Matt Baker	19 June 2022	N/A
3	"Maia"	Dries Vos	Matt Baker	19 June 2022	N/A
4	"Jaisal"	Dries Vos	Matt Baker	19 June 2022	N/A
5	"Ryan"	Dries Vos	Matt Baker	19 June 2022	N/A
6	"Harry"	Dries Vos	Matt Baker	19 June 2022	N/A
7	"Susannah"	Dries Vos	Matt Baker	19 June 2022	N/A
8	"Danny"	Dries Vos	Matt Baker	19 June 2022	N/A

=== Series 2 ===
No.	Title	Directed by	Written by	Original release date	UK viewers (millions)
1	"Jon"	Carolina Giammetta	Joy Wilkinson	17 July 2024	N/A
2	"Richard & Natasha"	Carolina Giammetta	Joy Wilkinson	17 July 2024	N/A
3	"Louisa"	Carolina Giammetta	Joy Wilkinson	18 July 2024	N/A
4	"Alistair"	Carolina Giammetta	Joy Wilkinson	18 July 2024	N/A
5	"Sapphire"	Carolina Giammetta	David Allison	24 July 2024	N/A
6	"Joseph"	Carolina Giammetta	David Allison	24 July 2024	N/A
7	"Kate"	Carolina Giammetta	David Allison	25 July 2024	N/A
8	"Emma & Ben"	Carolina Giammetta	Joy Wilkinson	25 July 2024	N/A

== Reception ==
The critical response to the first series was mediocre. Rebecca Nicholson in The Guardian labelled it an "awfully cartoonish crime series" and awarded it two out of five stars. Nick Hilton in The Independent also gave it two out of five stars, and wrote that DS Danny Frater is "hitting every cliché possible, from every genre of detective fiction." Another two stars review was published in the i paper by Rachael Sigee, who stated that "Suspect’s wordy half-hour instalments offered a lot of script but didn’t seem to be saying very much or do enough to make you care about the characters". On Metacritic, the series holds a score of 49, "Mixed or average reviews".
