= The Ghost Squad =

- Australian DVD cover of the series
- Created by: Tom Grieves
- Directed by: Richard Laxton; Daniel Percival; Charles Palmer
- Starring: Elaine Cassidy; Emma Fielding; Jonas Armstrong; James Weber-Brown
- Composer: Ben Bartlett
- Country of origin: United Kingdom
- Original language: English
- No. of series: 1
- No. of episodes: 8 (list of episodes)

Production
- Producer: Chris Clough
- Running time: 48–49 minutes
- Production company: Company Pictures

Original release
- Network: Channel 4
- Release: 15 November – 27 December 2005

The Ghost Squad is a British crime drama series produced by Company Pictures, for Channel 4, broadcast from 15 November to 27 December 2005. Created by Tom Grieves, the series was inspired by the real life "Ghost Squad" that existed between 1994 and 1998, secretly investigating police corruption. Elaine Cassidy, Emma Fielding and Jonas Armstrong star as protagonists Amy Harris, Carole McKay and Pete Maitland.

A single series of eight episodes (including a double-length finale) was broadcast before the series was axed, citing poor viewing figures, despite critical acclaim from critics and viewers alike. The series has since been released on DVD in France and Australia only; a release in its native United Kingdom was pulled as a result of poor projected sales.

== Plot ==
The premise of The Ghost Squad revolves around Detective Constable Amy Harris (Elaine Cassidy), who is recruited into the squad after investigating her own colleagues for corruption following a death in custody. Based upon the real-life "Ghost Squad", writer and creator Tom Grieves explains that the real-life closure of the squad meant that he had to write the story as if the squad continued to operate in secret after officially being shut down.

A total of eight episodes were broadcast, including a double-length finale that was split into two-halves for international broadcast. All eight episodes have since been uploaded for streaming on YouTube by the series' production company. Charles Pattinson and George Faber served as executive producers.

== Cast ==
- Elaine Cassidy as P.C./D.C. Amy Harris
- Emma Fielding as D.S.I. Carole McKay
- Jonas Armstrong as D.S. Pete Maitland
- James Weber-Brown as D.A.C. Robert Townsend

=== Guest cast ===
- Lloyd Owen as D.I. Bryce (Episode 1)
- Sam Spruell as P.C. Will Surridge (Episode 1)
- Christine Tremarco as D.S. Jo Miller (Episode 1)
- Johnny Harris as D.S. Charlie Fletcher (Episode 1)
- Alastair Galbraith as D.I. Brooke, IPCC (Episode 1)
- Brendan Coyle as P.S. Ralph Allen (Episode 3)
- Jason Flemyng as D.S. Jimmy Franks (Episode 5)
- Chloe Howman as D.S. Kay Maudsley (Episode 5)
- Neve McIntosh as W.P.C. Sarah Houghton (Episode 6)
- Adrian Lester as D.I. Gus Phillips (Episodes 7–8)

== Episode list ==
No. in series	Title	Directed by	Written by	Original release date	UK viewers (millions)
1	"One of Us"	Richard Laxton	Tom Grieves	15 November 2005	N/A
PC Amy Harris apprehends a local street criminal, Rakesh (Adam Deacon) on her way to work. After a fight breaks out in custody, Amy takes Rakesh to the safety of the interview room. She leaves Rakesh to collect some light refreshments, but upon her return, she finds him badly beaten and unconscious. Despite her best efforts, Rakesh dies, and the IPCC arrive almost instantaneously to investigate his death. When both Amy's uniform and CCTV of the corridor leading up to the interview room disappear, Amy realises she is being framed by her fellow colleagues for murder. Unaware of who she can trust, Amy conducts her own investigation – playing her colleagues off against one another to discover the real culprit. When Pete Maitland (Jonas Armstrong) offers her assistance, she concocts a clever plan to frame him as a grass in order for the real murderers to finally show their true hands. But is Amy brave enough – and willing to sacrifice her career in the police force – to expose those responsible?
2	"Hardcore"	Daniel Percival	Tom Grieves	15 November 2005	N/A
Amy, newly recruited to the Ghost Squad, is sent undercover with a group of police officers who have also been working undercover – to expose a sex trafficking network. However, five girls trafficked into the country have mysteriously disappeared – and Amy's task is to find out of which of the team is on the fiddle. Amy meets with the main kingpin of the operation, who asks her to produce 30 passports for his latest shipment. Meanwhile, Amy discovers that Mike (Cal MacAninch) has developed a serious heroin addiction, and instead of logging the bribes given to him, uses them to buy smack. However, despite this, Amy suspects that Mike is clean. Later meeting to hand over the agreed passports, Amy discovers that Kate (Donna Alexander) is sleeping with the prime suspect after helping her out of a tight corner. En route to the planned drop, Kate manages to become separated from the convoy, and when Amy and Mike arrive at the docks, they find the planned container is empty and all thirty girls missing.
3	"Heroes"	Daniel Percival	Tom Grieves	22 November 2005	N/A
Amy is sent undercover to work alongside police sergeant Ralph Allen, whose track record of dealing with a local girl gang terrorising a nearby council estate has led to allegations of sexual favours and corruption. On their first shift together, they are tasked with tracking down Danielle Parker, a frequent absconder who has failed to sign for her bail. Later, when a mass brawl breaks out, Amy and Allen are forced to arrest the gang. However, they are soon released on bail, leading Amy to suspect something funny is going on. Back on the estate, they corner an off-duty police officer and beat him half to death. When Allen persuades a witness not to come forward, Amy suspects he may be protecting the gang, unaware of his ulterior motive. When she discovers CCTV images which place Allen with the missing Danielle Parker on the night of her disappearance, she confronts him. Meanwhile, McKay becomes concerned that Amy is passing confidential information on to her boyfriend and asks Pete to bug her flat.
4	"The Greater Good"	Charles Palmer	Oliver Turnbull	6 December 2005	N/A
Amy investigates the background of Chief Superintendent Sally Marshall, a squeaky-clean leader of a Scottish murder squad, who is in line for further promotion to commander. McKay informs her that Marshall's clean-up rate is 30% higher than the national average and way above home office targets. Amy is paired with Marshall to investigate the murder of a twenty-something receptionist who is brutally beaten to death with a claw hammer in a local park on her way home from work. Marshall's second-in-command, DI Sinclair, highlights Keith Warren as the prime suspect – a local unemployed forty-something who was formerly questioned over the death of a young girl in Edinburgh 18 months ago with the same MO. As Amy continues to get close to Marshall, she discovers that Marshall has a tape of Sinclair bullying a witness in another case into giving a false statement. And when a claw hammer turns up in Keith Warren's shed moments after it being searched by Sinclair, Amy begins to suspect she is hunting the wrong person.
5	"Firewall"	Charles Palmer	Bamber Afzali	13 December 2005	N/A
Amy is tasked to investigate three officers working on the witness protection programme, who are tasked with keeping witness Brendan Harris safe from harm. Harris was witness to a shooting committed by Johnny Cole, a well documented gangster. But after being intimidated by his brother, Danny, Harris was forced to seek protection from the police. However, someone appears to be leaking information to Danny Cole. Amy and Pete discover that McKay has already placed a ghost squad officer – Jimmy Franks – inside the operation – but suspects that Jimmy himself may have been corrupted. However, initial suspicion points towards DS Tony Sharpe, who fails to acknowledge Franks when he openly questions him about Cole. When Jimmy goes off the rails and takes Harris hostage, Amy soon realises that one of her own could be involved in the cover-up – but Pete isn't so sure. And when Sharpe is murdered by an unknown assailant in a gangland execution, it appears to confirm his involvement with Cole's gang. Or does it?
6	"The Necessary Means"	Richard Laxton	Declan Croghan	20 December 2005	N/A
Amy is sent undercover to investigate WPC Sarah Houghton, the senior officer of a Community Safety Unit in Nottinghamshire who is under investigation by the Financial Crimes Unit. Amy's task is to find out where Houghton's money is coming from. Amy discovers that Houghton is in a relationship with DS Vinny Thomas, and accompanies them to a house party for fellow officers. Amy witnesses a meeting between Thomas and a drug dealer who has been flagged up by divisional CID, but Amy soon realises that Thomas is the one supplying the drugs. In an attempt to get close to Thomas, Amy reveals confidential information gathered by Houghton on a known drug dealer, Terry Gill, who has violently attacked and beaten his girlfriend. Amy accompanies Thomas on a raid of Gill's premises, but soon realises that Thomas' supply is being gathered from the police property store and sold on at a profit. Sarah is disappointed that Amy has chosen to sell her out, but will she see sense and give up Thomas to save her own skin – and her career?
7	"Colourblind (Part One)"	Richard Laxton	Tom Grieves	27 December 2005	N/A
Amy's latest task finds her undercover with a divisional CID unit of the Metropolitan Police. PC Terry Dewhurst is brutally murdered whilst in pursuit of a group of youths who attacked his panda car with a block of concrete. His partner, PC Paul Bullen, was nowhere to be seen, and was radio silent for a significant period after Terry's distress call. While Bullen's motives are being investigated by the murder squad, Amy is tasked to find out whether DI Gus Phillips orchestrated the murder – after having been photographed with the leader of the gang involved, Mickey Bourne. When Amy comes face-to-face with Bourne, he threatens her with a knife, until Phillips steps in and seemingly saves her life. As well as being suspected of being involved in drugs and prostitution, Phillips also appears to be grooming an informant, Geeta Patel, which Pete seemingly confirms after capturing photos of the pair in an intimate encounter. However, Amy's cover comes close to being blown when Patel spots Pete keeping Phillips under surveillance.
8	"Colourblind (Part Two)"	Richard Laxton	Tom Grieves	27 December 2005	N/A
Amy is furious when she discovers that the photos of Phillips in an intimate encounter with Geeta Patel have been forged by Pete. Amy decides to open up to Phillips, revealing that she has been secretly investigating him for some time. McKay threatens Amy with suspension, but Amy ploughs on ahead, regardless. She later suggests to Phillips that his boss, DCI Tom Crane, may have been the person responsible for the Ghost Squad's investigation into his conduct. Amy collects secret audio evidence from several uniformed officers which suggest Crane is stirring up trouble, but when Amy submits her findings to McKay, McKay is less than pleased. However, when Amy discovers an old photo of McKay and Crane together, she suspects McKay may have been stringing her along. Using the evidence collected by Amy, Phillips confronts Crane, but Crane denies all knowledge of the accusations. When Phillips finally pins down evidence on Mickey Bourne for the murder of Terry Dewhurst, McKay encourages Amy to back up his story.
