= Two Weeks to Live (TV series) =

British comedy-drama television series

- Genre: Crime; Comedy drama
- Created by: Gaby Hull
- Directed by: Al Campbell
- Starring: Maisie Williams; Sian Clifford; Mawaan Rizwan; Taheen Modak; Sean Pertwee; Jason Flemyng; Thalissa Teixeira; Kerry Howard
- Composer: Toydrum
- Country of origin: United Kingdom
- Original language: English
- No. of series: 1
- No. of episodes: 6

Production
- Executive producer: Morwenna Gordon
- Producers: Lorraine Goodman; Charlotte Surtees
- Cinematography: Mattias Nyberg
- Editor: Mike Holliday
- Production company: Kudos Film and Television

Original release
- Network: Sky One
- Release: 2 September – 7 October 2020

Two Weeks to Live is a British television comedy drama miniseries created by Gaby Hull. It stars Maisie Williams as a misfit teenager, Kim who has been raised living "off-the-grid" by her overprotective survivalist mother, Tina. The series premiered on 2 September 2020 on Sky One.

== Premise ==
Kim goes to a pub for the first time as an adventure and meets two brothers, Nicky and Jay. She is naive and goes home with them where they play a practical joke on Kim – a fake video depicting a nuclear apocalypse and that everybody has two weeks to live. Kim, raised to believe the end times are close, takes the video seriously and sets off to kill the man, Jimmy who murdered her father, Bill when she was a child. At Jimmy's home, she injures his henchman, Ian and then struggles with Jimmy, who accidentally falls to his death. Jay steals Jimmy's bag of cash, but hides it from Nicky. Tina arrives to collect Kim and kills Ian with a crossbow bolt. The group cleans away evidence and drive off to dispose of Ian's corpse. Corrupt police, Brooks and Thompson arrive to discover Jimmy dead and Ian (and the cash bag) missing. They initially blame Ian and confront and kill his innocent wife.

== Cast and characters ==
=== Main ===
- Maisie Williams as Kim Noakes
- Sian Clifford as Tina Noakes
- Mawaan Rizwan as Nicky
- Taheen Modak as Jay
- Sean Pertwee as Jimmy Davies
- Jason Flemyng as DI Alan Brooks
- Thalissa Teixeira as Thompson
- Kerry Howard as Beth

=== Supporting ===
- Michael Begley as Ian
- Sean Knopp as Bill Noakes, Kim's dad
- Pooky Quesnel as Mandy

== Episodes ==
No.	Title	Directed by	Written by	Original release date
1	"Episode 1"	Al Campbell	Gaby Hull	2 September 2020
Kim walks into a diner and asks for breakfast. The owner, noticing her naivety tries to steal from her by charging for parking, bathroom, etc. She beats up the owner and leaves. Next, she drives to a pub where her parents had a first date. There she meets Nicky and Jay and she tells them about how this was her first visit to the civilization that she planned with her father (actually, his ashes). She talks about how the world would end in a nuclear blast or some epidemic, along with espousing various anti-government conspiracy theories. As a prank, Jay shows her some fake/old video of news coverage of a nuclear blast with the caption "Two weeks to live". Kim takes it seriously and drives to the home of crime boss Jimmy Davies, whom she believes killed her father. She shoots Ian and points the gun at Jimmy, while Nicky and Jay, who followed, wait for her outside Jimmy's house.
2	"Episode 2"	Al Campbell	Gaby Hull	9 September 2020
Kim and Jimmy get into a fight. Jimmy remembers how he killed Kim's father while she was there. Kim realizes that there is no nuclear blast and the world is not ending in two weeks. Jimmy tries to throw Kim off the balcony but he dies instead. Before dying he says "tell Jo...". Kim is angry that Nicky lied to her. Turns out Ian is alive and the group plans to leave him at the hospital. While Kim is clearing her jeep, her mother Tina finds her, ties her up, puts her in the back of her jeep and drives away.
3	"Episode 3"	Al Campbell	Gaby Hull	16 September 2020
Kim tells her mom that she killed Jimmy and his place is filled with her fingerprints. Back home, Jay thinks Kim left and decides to leave with the bag of cash he found in the house. Ian picks up his gun to stop him, and Tina kills Ian with her crossbow. A calendar in the house marks a meeting at 11 am with some people named Brooks and Thompson, hence the group cleans up the place right before 11 am. They make it look like Ian took the cash and killed Jimmy. They go to Beth's place (Jay's girlfriend) along with Ian's body. Jay finds Beth's positive pregnancy test, and he picks up the bag of cash and hides it. Thompson and Brooks go to Ian's house to talk to his wife. Nicky, Kim, and Tina go to bury Ian's body in the woods with Nicky as a lookout. Nicky reads Kim's diary. Thompson and Brooks are burying Ian's wife's body close by.
4	"Episode 4"	Al Campbell	Phoebe Eclair-Powell	23 September 2020
Next day, Tina lets Kim pick any one item on her wish list to do, before they go back to their remote/hidden home. They go to the fair where Kim and her father go along with the ashes that Kim carries around. Nicky reveals to Kim that her mom is lying about many things and that her pollution pills are just mints. She opens the box of ashes and sees it has some CD of a cricket match, but no ashes. Kim is infuriated about all the lies. Jay meanwhile, realizes that he could go to jail for being an accessory to murder and not see his kid grow. He goes to the police station to report the crime. Turns out Brooks and Thompson are cops and Jay is talking to Brooks. Brooks makes up a fake immunity form and gets the true story behind Jimmy's death. He gives Jay a tracker to put on Tina's van. Jay soon realizes the form is a fake due to a spelling mistake and puts the tracker in some fish sold at the supermarket he works in. He comes back home and tells the rest that he made a mistake. He receives a call from Beth, turns out it's Brooks. Tina tells Brooks that he can have the cash and a person to blame and kill.
5	"Episode 5"	Al Campbell	Lucy Montgomery	30 September 2020
They set up a meet outside the diner. While waiting in the parking lot, everyone is distracted when the crooked cops drive in. So Kim picks up the bag of money thinking it's just a bag drop. Tina pulls up right on time before the cops kidnap Kim. A drive-chase ensues ending with Brook's car crashing (both alive) and Tina drives to a camping site. Nicky accidentally reveals that he read Kim's diary, breaking her trust. Tina and Nicky argue about who will Kim choose.
6	"Episode 6"	Al Campbell	Gaby Hull	7 October 2020

== Production ==
The series was written by Gaby Hull and produced by Kudos. It stars Maisie Williams, Sian Clifford, Mawaan Rizwan, and Taheen Modak in main roles.

== Broadcast ==
The six-part series premiered on 2 September 2020 on Sky One in the United Kingdom. In the United States, the series was acquired by HBO Max and released on 5 November 2020.

== Reception ==
The Guardian considers that Williams "excels in her fish-out-of-water role, flitting between hapless and determined, worldly and childlike". The Independent reviewer wrote "Two Weeks To Live lets Williams flex comedy muscles while also show off her stunt fighting and stunt skills." The NME described the action drama as also genuinely funny.
