= Imogen King =

English actress (born 1996)

- Born: Imogen Hare Duke King; 1996 (age 29–30); Manchester, England
- Education: Goldsmiths, University of London
- Years active: 2013–present

Imogen Hare Duke King (born 1996) is an English actress. She is known for her roles in the second series of Clique (2018) on BBC Three, the ITV crime drama The Bay (2019–2021), the period drama Hotel Portofino (2022), and the Channel 4 crime drama Suspect (2022).

== Early life ==
King is from Manchester. She joined local youth drama companies at The Lowry and the Royal Exchange, participating in the 2013 National Theatre Connections. She graduated with a Bachelor of Arts in Sociology from Goldsmiths, University of London in 2017. She enrolled in a Shakespearean programme at the Independent Centre for Actor Training in Bolton.

== Career ==
King made her television debut in a 2014 episode of the BBC One medical soap opera Doctors and her feature film debut the following year as a young version of Lily Cole's character in The Messenger. This was followed by guest appearances in the BBC One soap opera Casualty and anthology series Moving On, a role as Kelly in the Channel 4 television film The Watchman with Stephen Graham.

Upon graduating from university, King joined the cast of the BBC Three thriller Clique for its second series as Rayna. She had small roles in the 2017 and 2018 war films Darkest Hour and A Private War. In 2019, King began playing Abbie Armstrong in the ITV crime drama The Bay.

In 2022, King had a main role as Melissa de Vere in the BritBox period drama Hotel Portofino and played murder victim and Danny Frater's (James Nesbitt) daughter Christina in the Channel 4 crime drama Suspect.

== Filmography ==
=== Film ===
Year	Title	Role	Notes
2015	The Messenger	Young Emma	
2017	Darkest Hour	Teenage Girl at Tube Map	
2018	A Private War	Lily Shaw	Uncredited role
2019	Absent	Chloe	Short film
2024	Superbolt	Alice	Short film

=== Television ===
Year	Title	Role	Notes
2014	Doctors	Davina 'Divsie' Majors	Series 15; episode 207: "Out of the Blue"
2015	Casualty	Rosie Bess	Series 29; episode 42: "Dark Horses"
2016	Moving On	Ruby	Series 7; episode 3: "A Picture of Innocence"
2016	The Watchman	Kelly	Television film
2018	Doctors	Finn Gunnarson	Series 19; episode 240: "The Damage Done"
2018	Clique	Rayna	Series 2; episodes 1–6
2019–2021	The Bay	Abbie Armstrong	Series 1–2; 9 episodes
2022	Hotel Portofino	Melissa De Vere	Main role. Series 1; episodes 1–6
2022	Suspect	Christina Frater	Series 1; episodes 1–8
2024	Love Rat	Susie	Mini-series; episodes 1–4
2025	Death in Paradise	Daisy Mccrae	Series 14; episode 3

== Stage ==
Year	Title	Role	Notes
2013	I'm Spilling My Heart Out Here	Jodie	National Theatre Connections
2018	The Newspaper Boy	Jane	53two, Manchester
