= Joanna Horton =

English actress

Joanna Horton is an English actress, notable for her stage and television work, including an episode of Robin Hood (series 1 episode 4), Father Brown, Spooks and Foyle's War.

In 2009, Horton played Hannah in Days of Significance, written by Roy Williams, as part of the Royal Shakespeare Company, and played Barbara in The Gods Weep, written by Dennis Kelly, in 2010. In the same year, Horton also played Dunyasha in The Cherry Orchard, written by Anton Chekhov, at the Birmingham Rep, and Anna in Town, written by D.C. Moore, at the Royal & Derngate in Northampton. She appeared as Deb in an adaptation of Morgan Lloyd Malcolm's Belongings at Hampstead Theatre and Trafalgar Studios in 2011. During summer 2013 she appeared again with the Royal Shakespeare Company as Celia in As You Like It and Helena in All's Well That Ends Well. In 2017, she played Cassio in Othello at Shakespeare's Globe.

== Filmography ==
=== Film ===
Year	Title	Role	Notes
2008	Bike Squad	WPC 'Tazer' Horton	Television film
2009	Fish Tank	Kelly	
2009	Breaking the Mould	Janet	Television film
2010	Excluded	Lucy	Television film
2011	London's Burning	Dolly	Television film
2014	The Suspicions of Mr Whicher: The Ties That Bind	Mrs Ruth Hallows	Television film
2014	The Listener	Sylvia	Short film

=== Television ===
Year	Title	Role	Notes
2004	Foyle's War	Gwen Rivers	Series 3, Episode 4
2005	The Bill	Clare Forbes	Series 21, Episode 9
2005	Afterlife	Frankie Johnson	Series 1, Episode 3
2006	Eleventh Hour	Kelly Fox	Series 1, Episode 1
2006	Spooks	Leigh Bennett	Series 5, Episode 3
2006	Robin Hood	Annie	Series 1, Episode 4
2007	Five Days	Danielle Miller	Series 1
2007	Doctors	Maria Huxley	Series 9, Episode 21
2007	HolbyBlue	Chantelle Edwards	Series 1, Episode 7
2008	The Bill	Caroline Lock	Series 24, Episode 30
2008	Midnight Man	Lucy Elliott	Series 1, Episodes 2 and 3
2009	New Tricks	Leanne Sweeting	Series 6, Episode 7
2009	The Bill	Michelle Jarvis	Series 25, Episode 56
2010	Holby City	Marielle Leonard	Series 12, Episode 44
2011	Doctors	Steph Thomas	Series 12, Episode 229
2013	Father Brown	Joyce Evans	Series 1, Episode 6
2013	Endeavour	Linda Snow	Series 1, Episode 2
2014	Partners in Crime	Barbara Kemp	Series 1, Episode 4
2016	Silent Witness	Suzie Banks	Series 19, Episodes 1 and 2
2016	The People Next Door	Gemma	Short
2016	Dark Angel	Sarah Edwards	Series 1, Episode 2
2016	Dark Angel: Behind the Scenes	Herself/Sarah Edwards	Short
2017	Endeavour	Selina Berger	Series 4, Episode 4
2021	Professor T.	Lucy Turner	Series 1, Episode 4
2023	Vera	Kate Burns	Series 12, Episode 2
2025	Call the Midwife	Jill Trottwood	Series 14, Episode 4

=== Theatre ===
Year	Title	Role	Notes
2009	Days of Significance	Hannah	Royal Shakespeare Company. Directed by Maria Aberg
2010	The Gods Weep	Barbara	Royal Shakespeare Company. Directed by Maria Aberg
2010	Town	Anna	Royal & Derngate. Directed by Esther Richardson
2010	The Cherry Orchard	Dunyasha	Birmingham Rep. Directed by Rachel Kavanaugh
2011	Belongings	Deb	Hampstead Theatre and Trafalgar Studios. Directed by Maria Aberg
2013	All's Well That Ends Well	Helena	Royal Shakespeare Company. Directed by Nancy Meckler
2013	As You Like It	Celia	Royal Shakespeare Company. Directed by Maria Aberg
2017	Othello	Cassio	Shakespeare's Globe Theatre
