= Twenty8k =

- Film poster
- Directed by: David Kew; Neil Thompson
- Written by: Paul Abbott; Jimmy Dowdall
- Produced by: Martin Carr; Neil Thompson
- Starring: Parminder Nagra; Jonas Armstrong; Nichola Burley; Kaya Scodelario; Michael Socha; Kierston Wareing; Stephen Dillane; Nathalie Emmanuel
- Cinematography: Mike Beresford-Jones
- Edited by: David Kew
- Music by: Ruth Barrett; Jake Gosling
- Production companies: Formosa Films; AbbottVision
- Distributed by: Showbox Media Group Ltd
- Release date: 10 September 2012 (United Kingdom)
- Running time: 102 minutes
- Country: United Kingdom
- Language: English

Twenty8k is a 2012 British thriller film directed by David Kew and Neil Thompson and starring Parminder Nagra, Jonas Armstrong, and Stephen Dillane.

== Synopsis ==
In East London, during the lead up to the Olympics, a teenage boy is gunned down outside a nightclub and a young girl dies in a hit and run in two seemingly unrelated deaths. Deeva Jani, a Paris-based fashion executive, returns home to clear her brother Vipon of the shooting and soon discovers a much deeper conspiracy.

== Cast ==
- Parminder Nagra as Deeva Jani
- Jonas Armstrong as Clint O'Connor
- Nichola Burley as Andrea Patterson
- Kaya Scodelario as Sally Weaver
- Michael Socha as Tony Marchetto
- Kierston Wareing as Francesca Marchetto
- Stephen Dillane as DCI Edward Stone
- Nathalie Emmanuel as Carla
- Sebastian Nanena as Vipon Jani
