= Penny Layden =

British actress

Penny Layden (born 1969) is a British actress and narrator. She has performed at the National Theatre, with the Royal Shakespeare Company, the Old Vic Theatre, with Shared Experience and the Royal Exchange Theatre.

Her television credits include Call the Midwife, Silent Witness, Poppy Shakespeare and EastEnders; she also performed in The Libertine starring Johnny Depp.

== Film ==
Year	Title	Role	Notes
2004	The Libertine	Acting Troop	
2007	The Bad Mother's Handbook	Rambler Annie	
2008	Poppy Shakespeare	Sue	

== Television ==
Year	Title	Role	Notes
2012	Call the Midwife	Brenda McEntee	
2015	EastEnders	Frances Kane	
2017	Grantchester	Maud Sutton	
2020	Belgravia	Mrs Babbage	
2020-	Family Fortunes	Narrator	
