= Durham Crown Court =

Court building in Durham, England

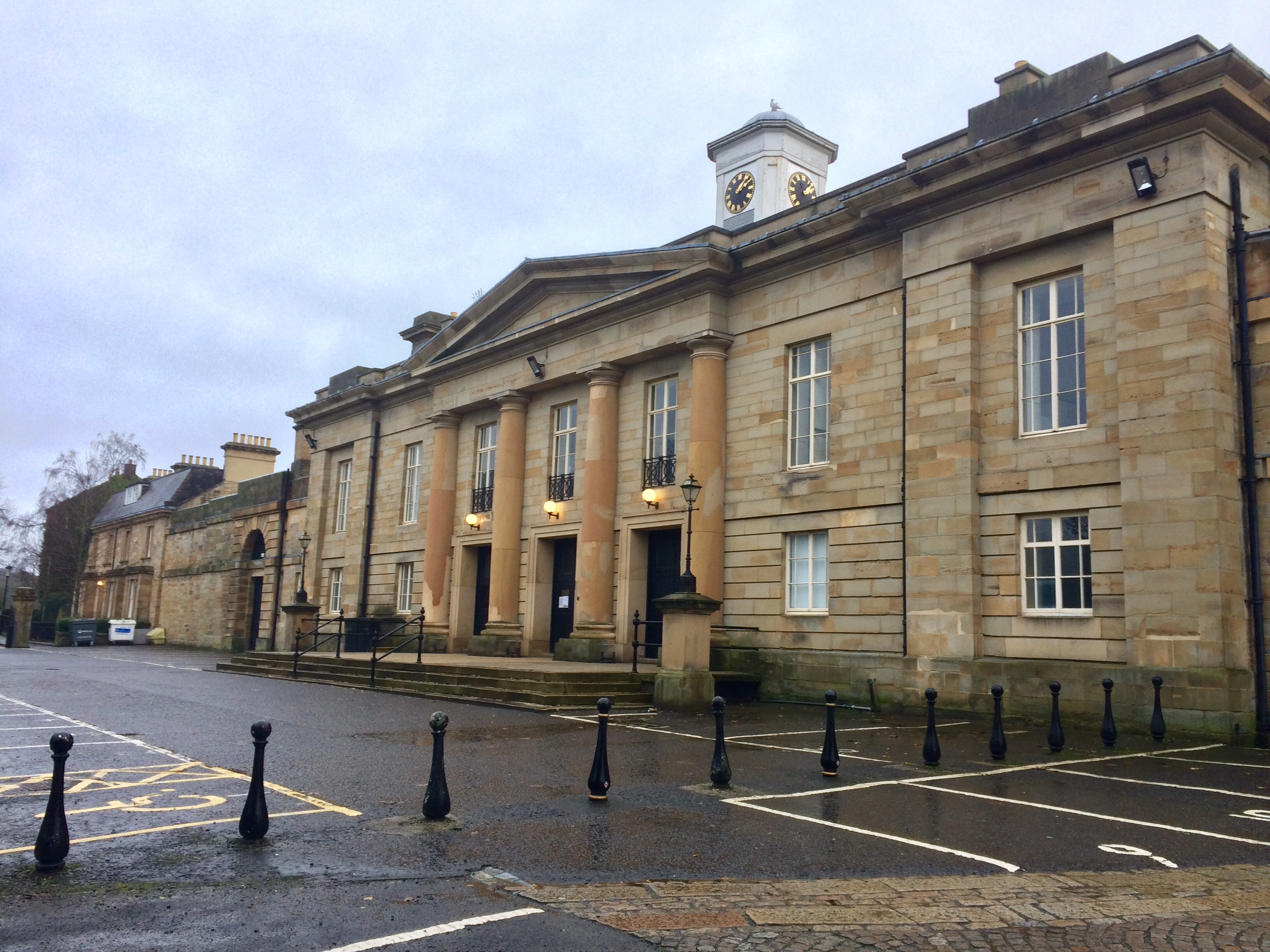
- Durham Crown Court

- Shown in County Durham
- 54.7740°N 1.5686°W
- Location: Old Elvet, Durham

History
- Built: 1811

Site notes
- Architect(s): George Moneypenny and Ignatius Bonomi
- Architectural style: Neoclassical style

Listed Building – Grade II*
- Official name: Crown Court
- Designated: 6 May 1952
- Reference no.: 1322878

Durham Crown Court is a Crown Court venue which deals with criminal cases at Old Elvet, Durham, England. Located immediately to the north of Durham Prison, it is a Grade II* listed building.

== History ==
The original venue for the assize courts in Durham was the old Shire Hall, also known as the County House, beside Palace Green; this "inconvenient building" had been established by Bishop John Cosin in the 1660s. In the early 19th century, it was decided to commission a more substantial courthouse; the site chosen, on the south side of Old Elvet, had been granted by Bishop William de St-Calais to the Prior and Convent of Durham in the late 11th century.

The building was designed by George Moneypenny and Ignatius Bonomi in the neoclassical style, built in ashlar stone and was officially opened on 14 August 1811. The design involved a symmetrical main frontage of seven bays facing north onto Court Lane. The central section of three bays, which was projected forward, featured a tetrastyle portico formed by Tuscan order columns supporting a pediment. There central section contained three double-doors on the ground floor and three sash windows, which were protected by wrought iron guardrails, on the first floor. The outer bays were also fenestrated by sash windows and the end bays were also slightly projected forward. Internally, the building was laid out to accommodate four courtrooms. Following the completion of the new building, the old Shire Hall at Palace Green was demolished and the Diocesan Registry (now the Durham University Music Library) was built on the site in 1820.

A large prison was opened, just behind the courthouse, in 1819. The interior was extensively refurbished to a design by the borough architect, William Crozier, in 1870.

Notable cases included the trial and conviction of Mary Ann Cotton, in March 1873, for murdering her two sons, her stepson and her husband.

The building served as the first meeting place of Durham County Council when it was established in 1889. The council later moved to its own purpose-built headquarters at Shire Hall, also on Old Elvet, in 1898.

Following the implementation of the Courts Act 1971, the former assizes courthouse was re-designated Durham Crown Court.

== See also ==
- Grade II* listed buildings in County Durham
