= HM Prison Durham =

Prison in the city of Durham, England

Coordinates: 54°46′24″N 1°34′05″W

HMP Durham
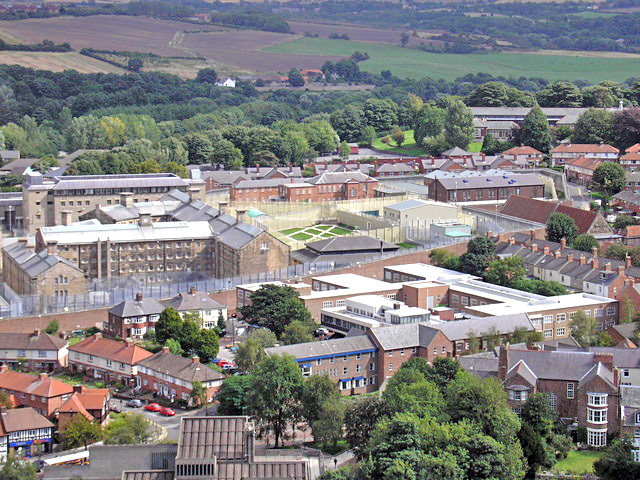
- Durham Prison viewed from the main tower of the cathedral
- Interactive map of HMP Durham
- Location: Durham, County Durham
- Security class: Adult Male/Category B
- Capacity: 965 as of 2026
- Population: 969 (October 2026)
- Opened: 19th century
- Managed by: HM Prison Services
- Governor: Tim Healy
- Website: Durham at justice.gov.uk

HM Prison Durham is a Georgian era reception Category B men's prison, located in the Elvet area of Durham in County Durham, England. Built in 1819, the prison is operated by His Majesty's Prison Service. Its women prisoners were all moved out to other prisons in 2005 due to overcrowding and suicides.

== History ==
The Northgate was established in Saddler Street around 1072. It was rebuilt by Bishop Thomas Langley in the early 15th century to provide custodial facilities, which became known as the Northgate Prison or the County Gaol, and was enlarged in 1773. There was also a House of Correction, also known as the Bridewell, established on the north side of Elvet Bridge in 1634.

In the early 19th century, the two institutions were consolidated at the current site, just south of the new Durham Courthouse: the new prison, consisting of some 600 cells, opened in 1819. The prison's C wing was built in 1850.

In 1832, protests over working conditions in the South Shields workhouse were supported by miners' strikes. Soldiers were sent to evict striking miners from their pubs. One miner, William Jobling, was convicted of the murder of a local magistrate near Jarrow Slake. He was hanged amid heightened security of 50 mounted Hussars and 50 infantrymen to protect the gallows. His body was gibbeted after death. Between 1869 and 1958, 95 judicial executions took place on the gallows at Durham prison or the court house. On 17 December 1958, the final execution at Durham took place when Private Brian Chandler (aged 20) was hanged for the murder of Martha Dodd in the course of theft. Chandler was a soldier based at Catterick camp, and had beaten the 83-year-old widow to death with a hammer.

Irish Republicans were imprisoned in Durham in 1918.

During the late 1960s and 1970s the prison became a study project for Stan Cohen and Laurie Taylor, which led to their publication of three books, namely Psychological Survival: The Experience of Long-term Imprisonment (1972), Escape Attempts (1976) and Prison Secrets (1978). Cohen additionally published Visions of Social Control: Crime, Punishment and Classification (1985).

In 1990 19-year-old-prisoner Darren Brook was murdered by another prisoner.

In 2001, Durham (which was a Category A prison for men and women at the time) was praised by Her Majesty's Chief Inspector of Prisons for its progressive regime, integration of inmates and falling levels of violence. However, in 2003 it was revealed that Durham had the highest prison suicide rate in England and, in 2004, a report by the Chief Inspector of Prisons criticised it for being severely overcrowded and the lack of education and work opportunities. The following year, the female high-security wing with 120 prisoners was discontinued and the prisoners transferred elsewhere after HM Inspectorate of Prisons reports concluded, following several suicides, that it was unsuitable for housing female prisoners.

In 2011 it was announced that, along with several other prisons, HMP Durham would be put up for market testing as part of a Ministry of Justice plan to make savings of almost 25%.

A 2014 report by HM Inspectorate of Prisons found that a third of inmates tested positive for drug use, a rate almost twice as high as similar prisons. Rates of violence were also higher than expected which indicated that monitoring should be improved. The prison was, however, praised for the quality of work activity and learning available to prisoners.

In 2018 the Channel 4 documentary Prison was filmed over a 7 month period in the jail.

As of 2022, Durham is a Reception prison for remand adult/ young male prisoners, primarily serving the courts of County Durham, Tyne and Wear, Teesside and Cumbria. It is divided into seven wingspans secure units, a segregation section and a healthcare section. The prison offers part-time education to all inmates, including courses on data input, bricklaying, woodwork, painting and decorating, waste management and gardening.

== Notable inmates ==
=== Current ===
- Colin Ash-Smith
- Lee Ford
- Mark Page

=== Former ===
- Martina Anderson
- David Boyd
- Ian Brady
- Mary Ann Cotton
- Andy Ferrell
- Sandra Gregory
- Myra Hindley
- Kieran Patrick Kelly
- Marie Therese Kouao
- Ronald Kray
- John McGowan-Fazakerley
- Bernadette McNeilly
- John McVicar
- Raoul Moat
- Ruth Neave
- Carole Richardson
- Charlie Richardson
- Eddie Richardson
- Maxine Robinson
- Maria Rossi
- John Straffen
- Sara Thornton
- Jamie Varley
- John Vickers.
- Judith Ward
- Rosemary West

== Film and TV links ==
- The 1980 British film McVicar starring Roger Daltrey is partially set in Durham Prison.
- The Prison is featured in Longford (2006) - Myra Hindley as an inmate
- Prison (2018) three-part documentary series is set in Durham Prison; aired on Channel 4
