= Elvet =

Coordinates: 54.775948°N 1.574325°W

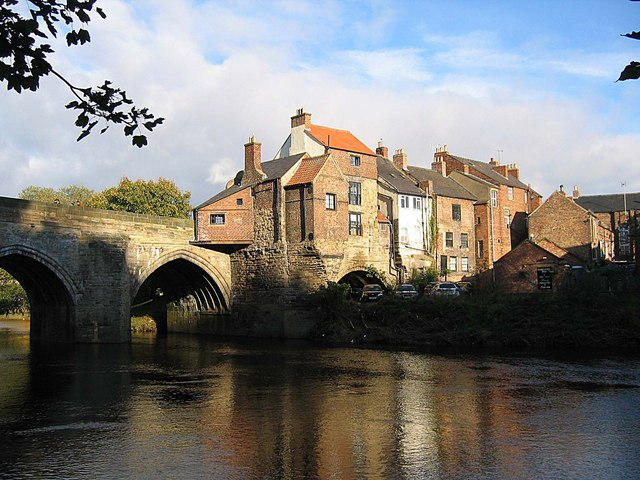
- Old Elvet Bridge

- Location within County Durham
- Population: 10,175 (2011 Ward)
- OS grid reference: NZ2742
- Civil parish: City of Durham
- Unitary authority: County Durham
- Ceremonial county: Durham
- Region: North East
- Country: England
- Sovereign state: United Kingdom
- Post town: DURHAM
- Postcode district: DH1
- Dialling code: 0191
- Police: Durham
- Fire: County Durham and Darlington
- Ambulance: North East
- UK Parliament: City of Durham

Elvet is an area of the city of Durham, in County Durham, England. It is situated on the opposite side of the River Wear from Durham Cathedral and forms the south-eastern part of central Durham.

== Name ==
The name Elvet is recorded as Aelfetee in circa 800 AD and in the 12th century as Aeluete and Eluete. It is thought to be Old English in origin, containing the element elfitu ("a swan") + either ēa ("a river") or ēg ("an island"), giving the name a meaning of "swan stream" or "swan island". The Swan and Three Cygnets, a public house on Elvet Bridge, is a reminder of the historical name given to this part of the city.

Other attempts at the etymology of Elvet include identification with the epithet Elfed in the name of Madog, a hero in Y Gododdin.

== History ==
Elvet grew up from two medieval settlements based around Old Elvet and St Oswald's Church and includes Church Street, Hallgarth Street, Whinney Hill and the Roman Catholic St Cuthbert's Church. Elvet is home to Durham Prison and Durham Crown Court centre (Court Lane), County Court centre (New Elvet) and magistrates' court (Old Elvet). The Crown Court centre was originally built for the Durham Assizes and is a grade II* listed building.

Elvet was chartered by Prior Bertram of Durham in 1188–1208 and was an ancient borough until 1835, when it became a township in the civil parish of St Oswald, within the municipal borough of Durham and Framwelgate. In 1866, Elvet became a separate civil parish within the borough; on 1 April 1916, the civil parish was abolished and Elvet became a ward of Durham. In 1911 the parish had a population of 3934. The 1919 25 inch to 1 mile Ordnance Survey maps show the Elvet ward boundary as running northeast along a stream from the Quarryheads Lane – Potters Bank junction to the River Wear and then along the centre of the river to join the municipal borough boundary where this came down to the river at Pelaw Woods, then following the municipal borough boundary along the river to Shincliffe Bridge and then along Stockton Road and Quarryheads Lane back to the junction with Potters Bank.

Elvet forms one of the character areas of Durham City conservation area. The Elvet character area is bounded by the River Wear to the west and north, the scarp slopes to the east and the road to Mountjoy Farm and Stockton Road to the south, as and extends along both sides of Quarryheads Lane as far as the Potters Bank roundabout, taking in the built up area of Elvet and surrounding countryside, including the Racecourse, Maiden Castle and Mount Joy hill. Since 2018, Elvet has been part of the Elvet and Gilesgate ward of the City of Durham parish. The south and east boundaries of the ward are similar to those of the character area, although excluding Mount Joy hill; as the ward takes in Crossgate, the Peninsular, Claypath and part of Gilesgate, the north and west boundaries lie beyond Elvet.

== Streets ==
=== Hallgarth Street ===
Elvet House, a former Crown building (c. 1951) in Hallgarth Street, is currently the base for Durham's Jobcentre Plus, Crown Prosecution Service, Driving Standards Agency and Tribunals Service. The County Court vacated its purpose-built 1960's annex to Elvet House in October 2008 to relocate alongside the magistrates' court.

The former priory farm included the former granary called the Tithe Barn, which is grade II* listed; and two former barns, other buildings and a wall which are grade II listed. The Tithe Barn has been dated between 1446 and 1449.

Hallgarth House, which is number 77, is grade II listed. The Victoria, formerly the Victoria Hotel, an inn which is number 86, is grade II listed.

Numbers 18, 21 to 32, 54 to 56, 58, 59, 67, 68, 69, 70, 73 and 75 are grade II listed.

=== Church Street ===
Oswald Court is off Church Street. A fire ball is reported to have fallen there during a thunderstorm on 13 July 1884.

=== New Elvet ===
The commercial centre of Elvet is around the junction of New Elvet, Old Elvet and Elvet Bridge. North of this is a connection to Leazes Road (the A690) via New Elvet Bridge, built in 1967–75.

South of this, the riverbank on the west side of New Elvet is dominated by Durham University buildings. The Elvet Riverside complex was built in two stages from 1962–66 and 1972–75 and consists of lecture theatres, teaching rooms, study spaces and offices. Pevsner described it as "contribut[ing] little to either river or street". It houses the faculty office for the faculty of arts and humanities, the school of modern languages and cultures, part of the department of English studies,

Dunelm House, home of Durham Students' Union, is located south of Elvet Riverside and is a grade II listed building built in 1966. It was designed by the same architects as Elvet Riverside, the Architects' Co-Partnership, but, according to Pevsner, succeeded architecturally where the other building failed. It forms a group with Ove Arup's Kingsgate Bridge, a grade I listed pedestrian bridge linking Elvet to the Durham Peninsula.

=== Old Elvet ===
Shire Hall, a grade II listed building, is located on Old Elvet. Ustinov College operates three student residences (houses 29, 34 and 38) on Old Elvet; The Swan is unnumbered but located immediately beside 38.

The local Masonic Lodge (Universities Lodge 2352) is at 36. The Masonic Hall was built in 1869. The architect was T C Ebdy.

The Royal County Hotel is a grade II listed building. It has a staircase traditionally said to have been taken from Lochleven Castle. Number 32, which has been used as an Adult Education Centre, is a grade II listed building.

Elvet Methodist Church was begun in 1902.

Number 34 is a grade II listed building. It has been used as the Graduate Society Offices. Elizabeth Milbanke and John Bacchus Dykes lived there at different times.

The Dun Cow, a pub which is number 37, is a grade II listed building.

Numbers 1, 5, 6, 14, 15, 15A, 17, 18, 19, 19½, 20, 25, 26, 26A, 27, 28, 30, 38, 39, 40, 42, 43, 44, 45, 46, 52, 53, 54, 55 and 55A are grade II listed buildings. Numbers are 47, 48 and 49 are grade II* listed buildings.

=== Whinney Hill ===
Whinney Hill is a street on a hill of the same name in the Elvet area, that name being derived from the whin (gorse) shrub that grows there in profusion. The street runs north–south from Durham Prison and the Durham City Cricket Grounds, on the banks of the River Wear, to the roundabout on the Stockton-on-Tees road near the Durham University science site. The lower site of Durham Johnston Comprehensive School was located on it until September 2009 when the school's sites merged.

Durham's third passenger railway station, Durham Elvet, opened in 1893 at the north end of Whinney Hill, closing in 1954. Its site is now occupied by Durham Magistrates' Court and the university's Parson's Field buildings.
