= St Cuthbert's Church, Durham =

Coordinates: 54.7746°N 1.5696°W

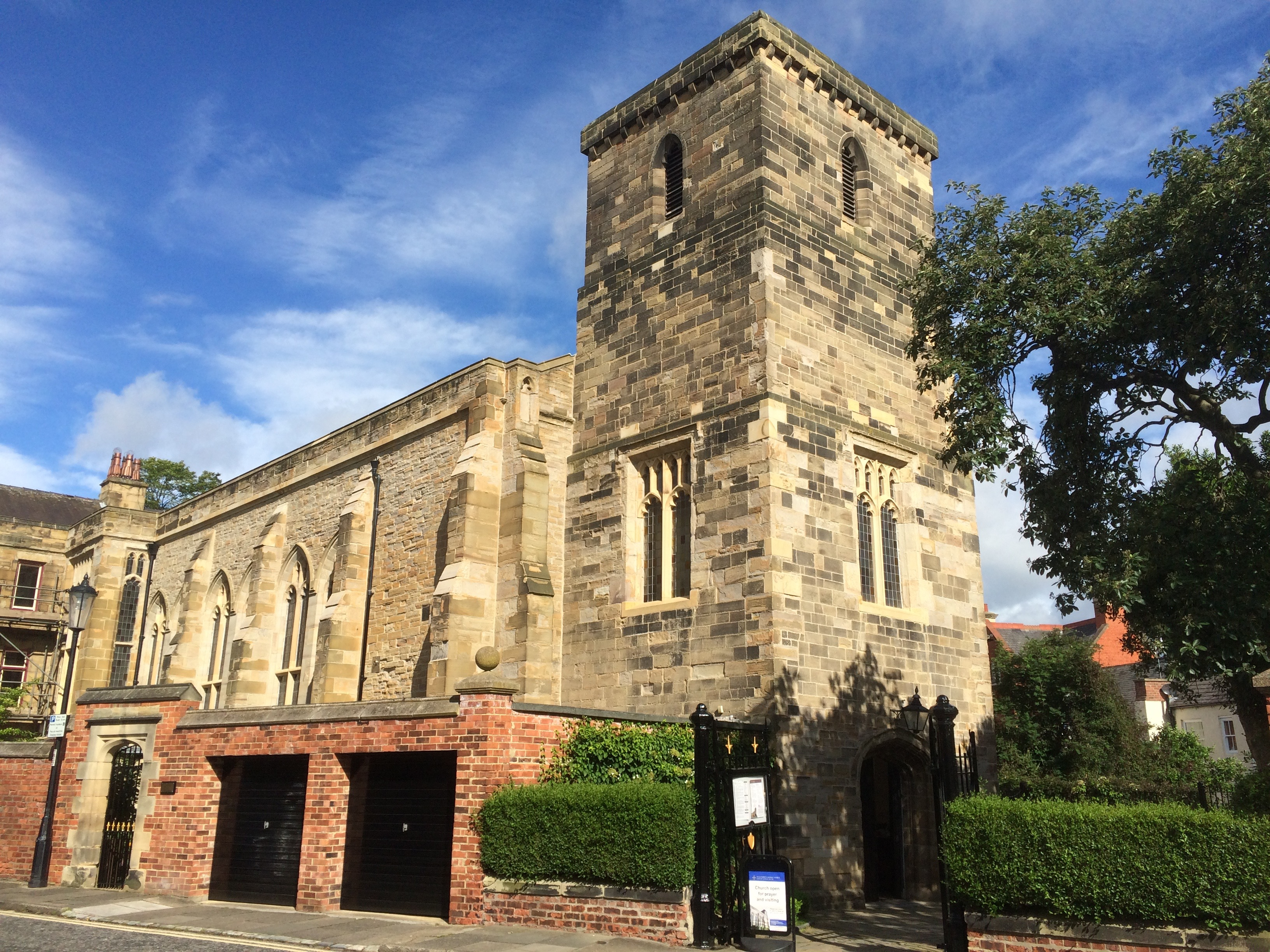

- Location in Durham
- OS grid reference: NZ 27785 42273
- Location: Durham
- Country: England
- Denomination: Roman Catholic
- Website: StCuthberts-Durham.org.uk

History
- Status: Active
- Founded: 1827
- Dedication: St Cuthbert
- Consecrated: 20 July 1910

Architecture
- Functional status: Parish church
- Heritage designation: Grade II listed
- Designated: 10 March 1988
- Architect: Ignatius Bonomi
- Architectural type: Gothic Revival architecture
- Style: English Gothic architecture, Perpendicular Gothic

Administration
- Province: Liverpool
- Diocese: Hexham and Newcastle
- Deanery: St Cuthbert, Durham

St Cuthbert's Church is a Roman Catholic parish church in Durham, England. It was opened on 31 May 1827 to replace two previous chapels, one run by the secular clergy and the other by the Jesuits. It is also the home of the Durham University Catholic Chaplaincy and Catholic Society. From 2012 to 2016 the parish was entrusted, along with the chaplaincy, to the Dominican Order, and its congregation has since maintained the Dominicans' influence. The church is a protected building, being part of the Elvet Green Conservation Area. It is named for St Cuthbert of Lindisfarne, the 7th century bishop, healer and patron of Northern England.

== History ==
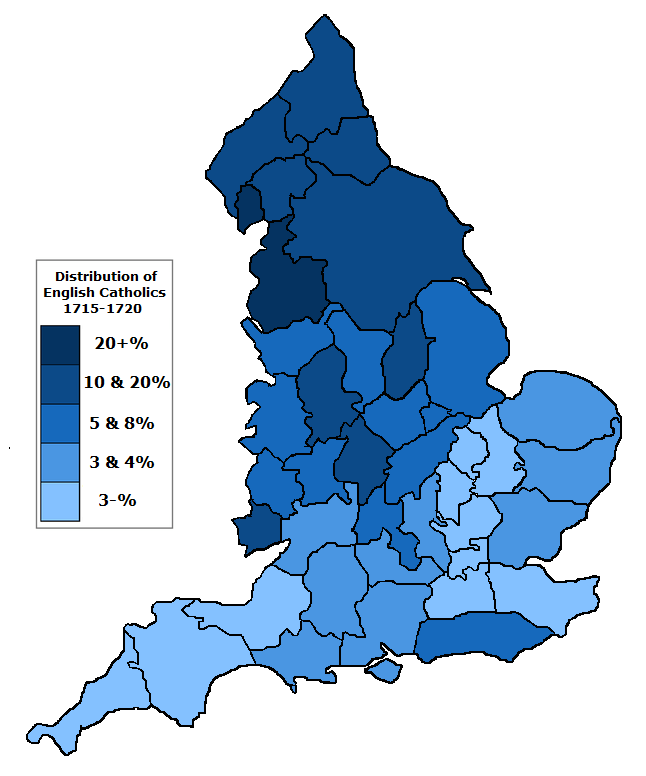
Distribution of English Recusant Catholics 1715-1720. County Durham is the second down on the north-east coast.

Although the establishment of the church goes back to 1827, the building has served a community of Durham and Northumberland Catholics that is continuous from the beginning of Catholic persecution at the English Reformation. While the Church of England became the official and only public Church for many centuries, English Catholic communities remained in the North – St Cuthbert's was founded by such a Catholic community in Durham.

In 1569, Durham was the theatre for the Rising of the North. Promoted by the Catholic Percys and Nevilles, respectively the Earls of Northumberland and Westmoreland, Northern English nobles rose against Elizabeth I to bring the Catholic Church back to England in a rebellion that climaxed with the Catholic Mass revived and celebrated at Durham Cathedral. The following year, the priest who celebrated at this Mass, Thomas Plumtree, was drawn and quartered in the market place. Plumtree was beatified by Pope Leo XIII in 1886, and St Cuthbert's maintains relics of his arm and hand.

=== Catholics in Old Elvet, Durham ===
By the early 17th century, there were Jesuit priests serving the Catholic community based at 33 and later 45 Old Elvet, operating a chapel that was later destroyed by a mob celebrating the Glorious Revolution of 1688 which ousted the Catholic King James II. From the 1660s to the late 18th century, Catholic landed gentry, of which there were many in the Durham/Northumberland region, began to buy up property in Old Elvet region in order to be close to the concealed Catholic worship. Votive Masses are still said at St Cuthbert's for the noble Catholic families. One Such family, the Salvins of nearby Croxdale, remain patrons of the congregation and can trace their patronage back to the 16th century. The Salvin coat of arms can be seen among those of other northern Catholic families on the wooden rood-screen behind the high altar. The 18th century saw degrees of toleration gained, except for the Jacobite rising of 1745. The Roman Catholic Relief Act 1791 saw the legality of Catholic public worship, and a permanent chapel was built in Elvet along with a residence for a Vicar Apostolic, a Catholic bishop, for Northern England.

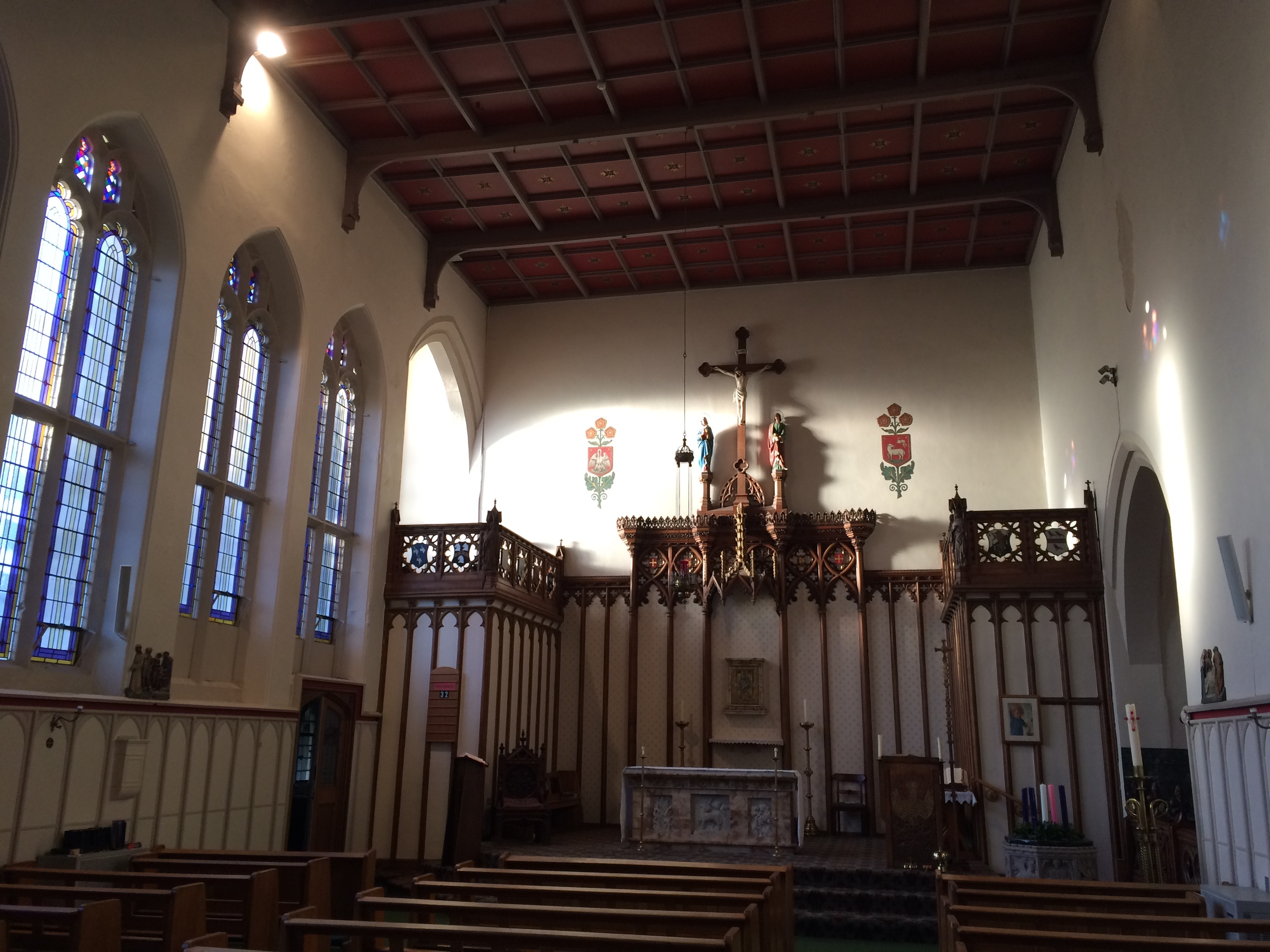
Interior of St Cuthbert's with the high altar and heraldic rood screen.

=== Catholic Emancipation and Erection of the Current Building ===
The Vicar Apostolic of the Northern District from 1790 to 1821 was Bishop William Gibson, who lived and regularly celebrated Mass there. The current building was built in 1827, two years before the Catholic Emancipation of 1829, which saw a restoration of civil and religious rights. The church was designed by Ignatius Bonomi, and while made to reflect the English gothic style, was built relatively level with other Old Elvet buildings and without a tower in order for the Catholics to remain somewhat discreet. In 1869, the tower was added to the church and in 1910 it was finally consecrated on 20 July.

=== Modern history ===
From 2012 to 2016, the Bishop of Hexham and Newcastle entrusted the parish to the Dominican Order who would also provide Catholic chaplains to Durham University with Fr Benjamin Earl, O.P. as prior, parish priest and chaplain. In 2013, a seven-month £300,000 refurbishment program was initiated and was completed in February 2014. Since 2012, St Cuthbert's has seen growth, especially in the student body. The incorporation of Dominican customs and liturgy – much of which has been maintained after the Dominicans left, is helped by the current parish priest, Fr Andrew Downie.

== Parish ==
St Cuthbert's is one of the largest Catholic parishes in the diocese of Hexham and Newcastle. It has a parish choir and a student choir. They sing a variety of repertoire, including Gregorian chant, Taizé, polyphony and Anglican music.

Holy Mass is offered on Sundays and weekdays at the following times:

- 10:00am (Parish Sung Mass)
- 6:30pm (Term time, student Sung Mass with reception)
- 12:15 Tuesday, Thursday, Friday
- 7:00pm Wednesday (chanted, followed by student dinner).

Morning and evening prayer is said through the week, and on Tuesday mornings, the Catholic Society chants Dominican Lauds and hosts breakfast.

== Gallery ==
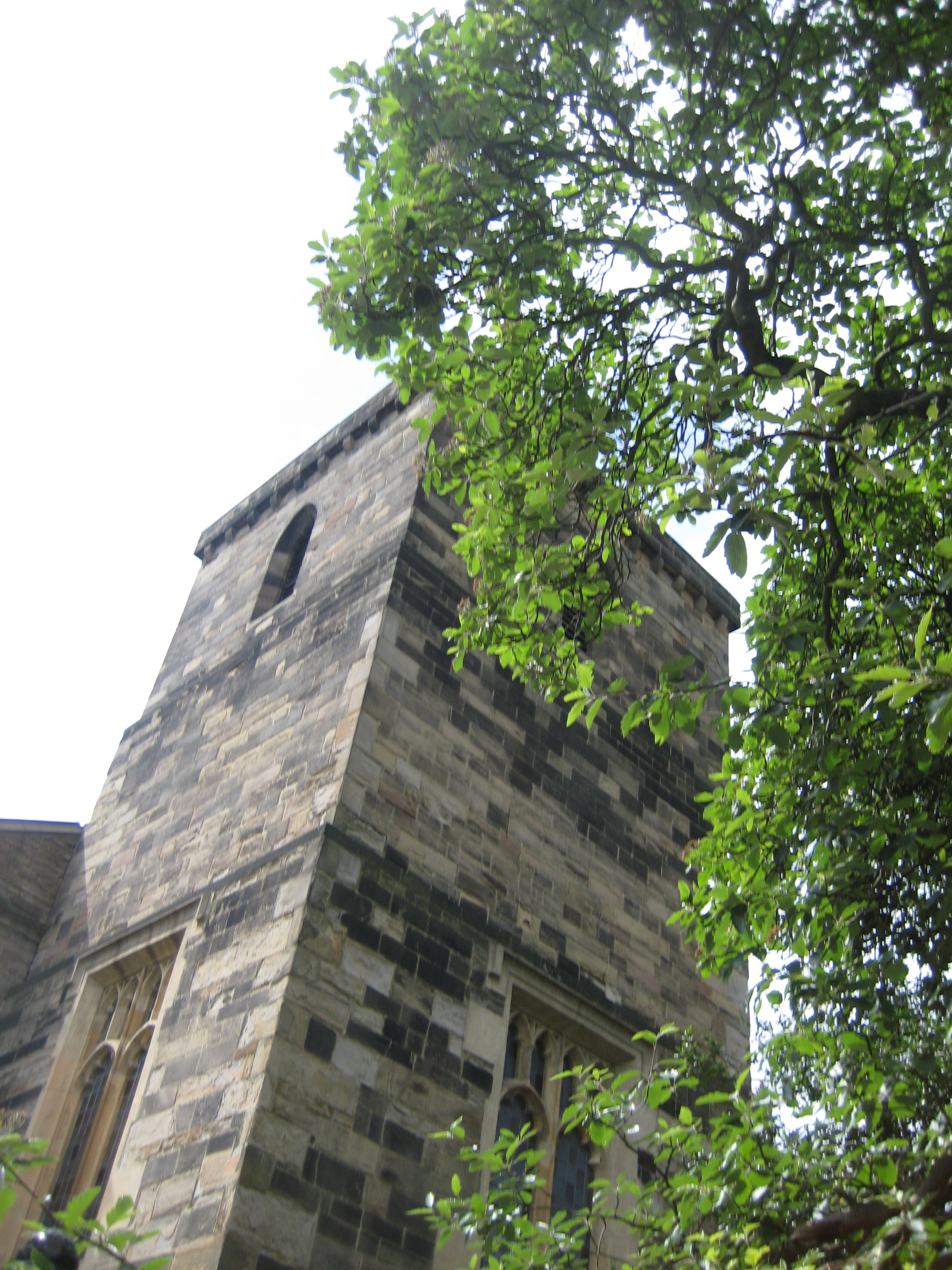
Church tower

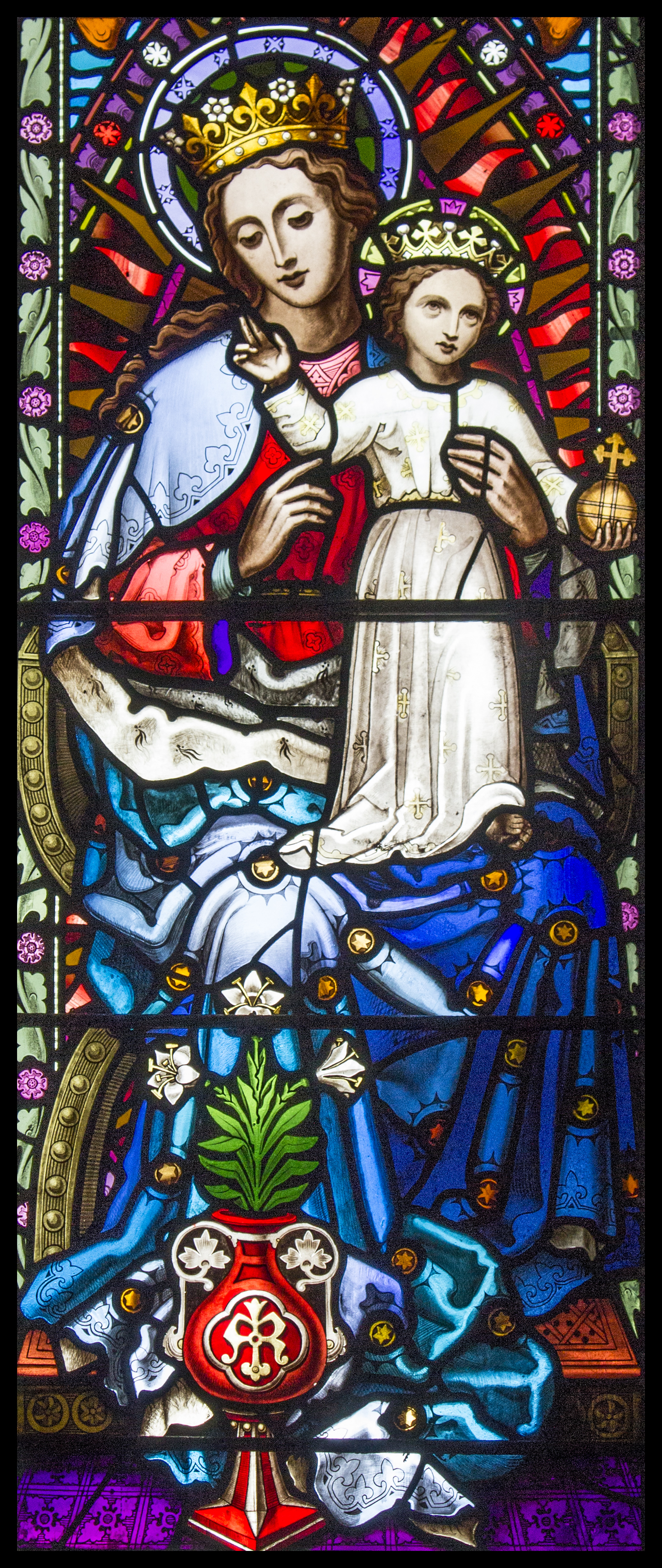
In the lady chapel

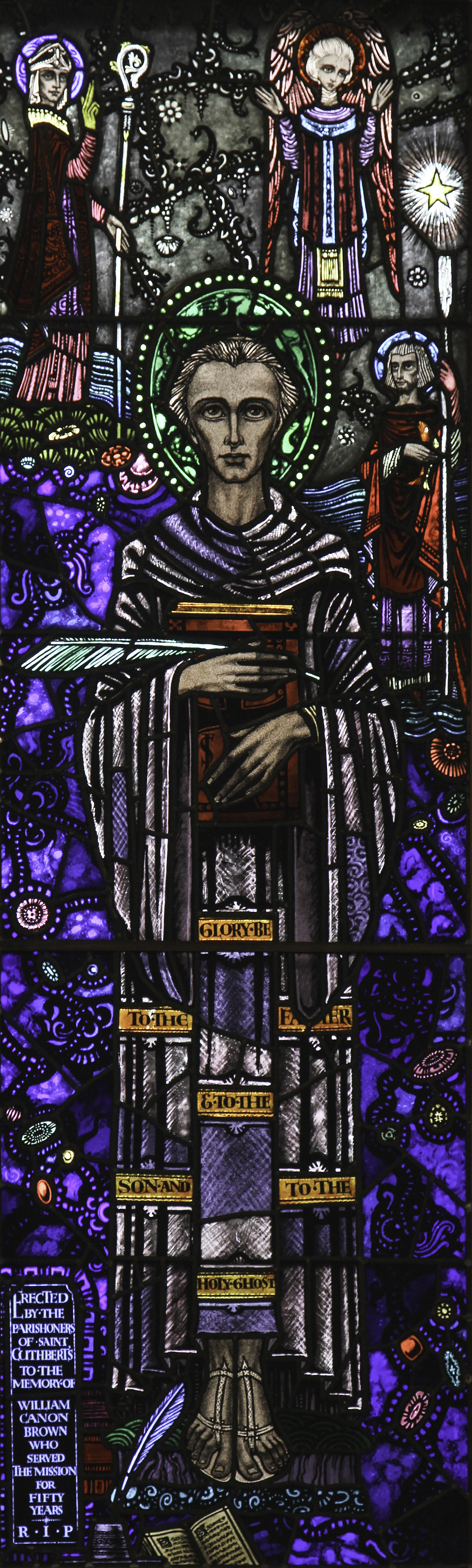
Venerable Bede by Harry Clarke

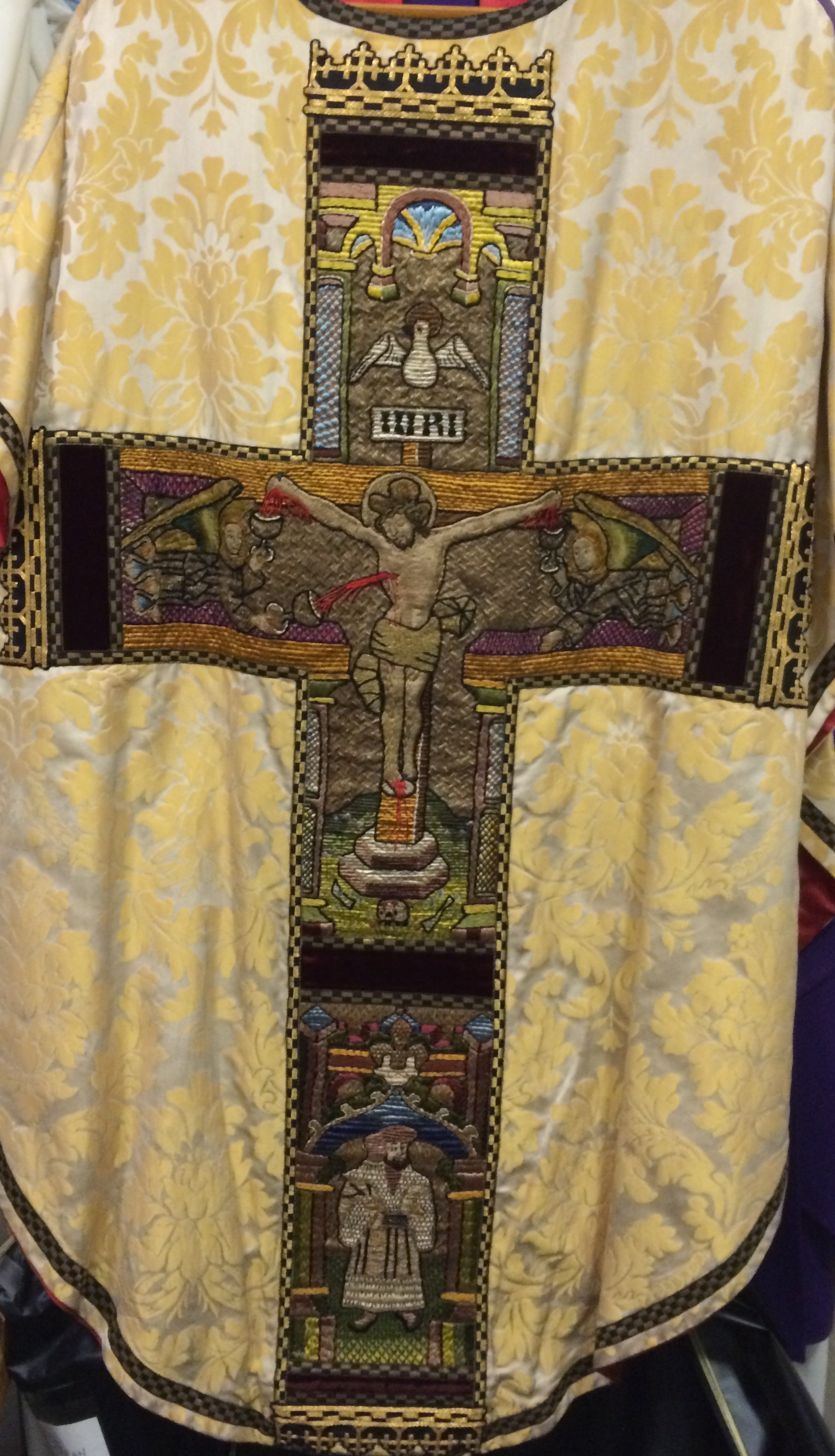
15th century, medieval orphrey on a chasuble in active use at St. Cuthbert's.

== See also ==
- Durham University
- Dominican Order
- Fr Benjamin Earl, O.P.
- St Cuthbert of Lindisfarne
