= Murder of Claire Tiltman =

Murder in Kent, United Kingdom in 1993

- School portrait of Claire Tiltman
- Location: 51°26′56.3″N 0°16′47.8″E; Greenhithe, Kent, England
- Date: 18 January 1993 c. 6:30 p.m.
- Target: Claire Tiltman
- Attack type: Stabbing
- Weapon: Knife
- Deaths: 1
- Victim: Claire Tiltman
- Perpetrator: Colin Ash-Smith
- No. of participants: 1
- Motive: Sadistic misogynistic violence; part of a pattern of premeditated knife attacks on young women
- Inquiry: Operation Artist
- Verdict: Guilty
- Convictions: Murder
- Judge: Mr Justice Sweeney
- Website: Justice for Claire (Archived)

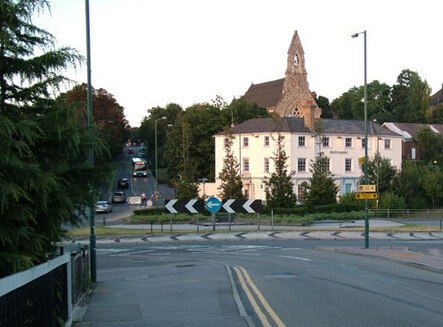
The large roundabout in Greenhithe by the McDonald's (the white building). Tiltman crossed the road in the distance, just after the roundabout, before entering an alleyway on the left hand side, where Ash-Smith stabbed her 9 times. She staggered back to the road and was found by passing motorists. There remains a memorial to her at the spot she was found.

On 18 January 1993, 16‑year‑old Claire Tiltman, an only child and pupil at Dartford Grammar School for Girls, was brutally stabbed in a small alley off London Road, Greenhithe, Kent. She had left home (Woodward Terrace, Stone) around 6:00 pm to walk to a friend’s house and was attacked roughly 30 minutes later in the dark alleyway. Claire suffered nine stab wounds and collapsed on the pavement; by the time help arrived she had bled to death. The pathologist recorded that she was attacked from behind (wearing her zipped-up jacket) and that her death was due to multiple stab wounds. The killing was motiveless and savage, shocking the local community. Kent Police launched a major inquiry (Operation Artist), searched the area, issued public appeals (including a £1,000 reward) and took over 1,500 statements, but no suspect was charged at the time.

== Claire Tiltman ==
Claire Tiltman (1976–1993) was a Dartford, Kent teenager. She was sixteen when she was murdered in January 1993 (she had celebrated her 16th birthday just days earlier). Tiltman was the only child of parents Cliff and Linda Tiltman and grew up with them in the Horns Cross area of Stone (near Greenhithe) in Dartford. She attended Dartford Grammar School for Girls, where friends affectionately nicknamed her “Tilts”.

=== Education and interests ===
Tiltman was in Year 11 and had just completed her mock GCSE exams before her death. She and her classmates regularly discussed their plans for further education, including college options. Outside class, Claire took part in the Duke of Edinburgh Award scheme: she was completing her Bronze award through activities at the local Dartford Fire Station. In line with that, her friends and family recalled that Tiltman dreamed of becoming a firefighter as an adult.

=== Personality and character ===
Claire was widely remembered as warm, outgoing and popular. At her trial, the judge described her as having “an engaging and lively personality” and being “extremely popular, with a wide circle of friends”. Her school friends recalled her as a “beautiful and loyal” classmate with a “wicked sense of humour”. The group of friends who campaigned for justice (the “Justice for Claire” group) later said she “drew people to her” and was “funny and ambitious”. In their remarks, close friends emphasized that Claire’s kindness and humor made her especially beloved: they spoke of remembering her as “the wonderful person she was” rather than focusing on the tragedy.

== Initial investigation and cold-case review ==
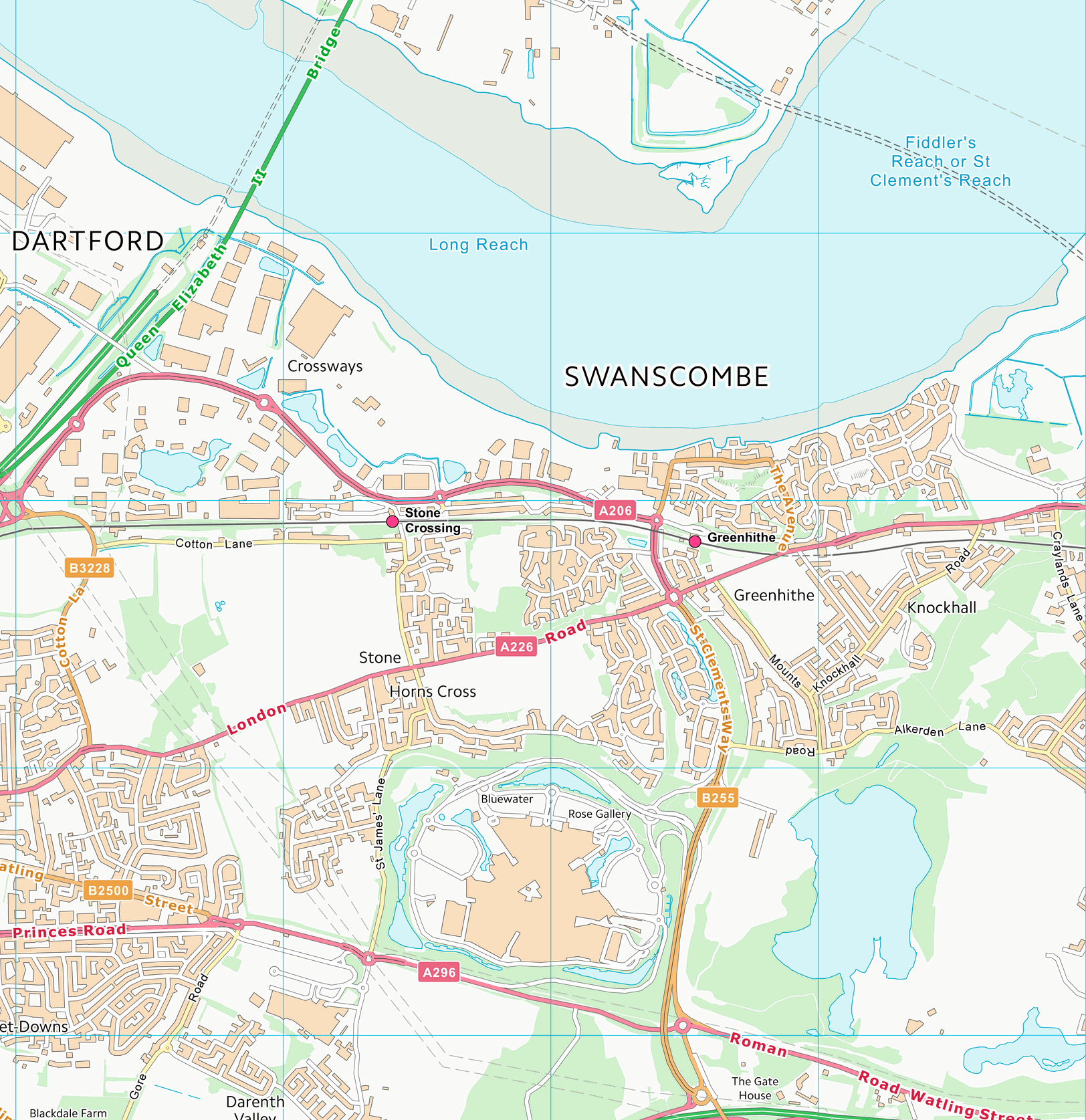
Location of Tiltman's murder in Greenhithe and the two other known attacks Colin Ash-Smith committed in 1988 and 1995

Despite exhaustive inquiries in 1993, the Tiltman case went cold. Police appealed nationally (Claire’s picture appeared on front pages) and received thousands of tips, but evidence was scant. For years her family (mother Linda and father Cliff Tiltman) kept the case in the public eye. In 2010 the Kent Police Cold Case Unit received Home Office funding to re-examine the Tiltman evidence with modern forensic techniques. In April 2012 (on the 19th anniversary) Claire’s father Cliff made a public plea for information. High-school friends of Claire formed the “Justice for Claire” campaign, organizing annual memorial events (for example, a candlelit walk in January 2013 retraced Claire’s last steps). These efforts kept pressure on police, but the case remained officially unsolved until a breakthrough in 2013.

=== Colin Ash-Smith: Profile and prior offenses ===
Colin Steven Ash-Smith (formerly known as Colin Smith) was born in 1968 and lived in nearby Swanscombe with his parents (both former Labour councillors). Ash-Smith knew the area well. He was acquainted with Claire’s family through the local Royal British Legion club, but they were not close. Prosecutors described Ash-Smith as a “knife-obsessed loner” with a history of violent fantasies. He had kept detailed “assault plans” and diaries rating his attacks; one entry admitted, “I would kill a schoolgirl – it sounds impressive”.

Before 1993 Ash-Smith carried out two other violent crimes in the area. On 21 December 1988, in Swanscombe, he kidnapped a 27-year-old woman at gunpoint, dragged her to a quarry, attempted to rape her, and tried to murder her by strangulation and five back-stabs. The victim survived. In October 1995, Ash-Smith attacked 21-year-old healthcare assistant Charlotte Barnard in Greenhithe (less than 400 m from Claire’s murder site). He dragged Barnard into an industrial yard and stabbed her 14 times, leaving her for dead. The 1988 victim and Charlotte Barnard both testified that Ash-Smith had the same appearance (fair hair, around 6 ft tall) and wearing the same beige jacket he later wore to Claire’s funeral.

His mother, Diane, was a former Labour Party councillor and later mayor. She told police that he had been driving her home at the time of the attack on Claire. In 1997 she said neither she, her husband, or son had had anything to do with Claire's killing.

His father Aubrey, who died in May 2016, had also served as a Labour Party councillor, but was jailed for 12 months in 1997 for perverting the course of justice. He had destroyed a knife just before the family home was due to be searched by police. He had admitted he boiled, dismantled and threw away a knife to destroy evidence. Colin was denied a Special Purpose Licence to attend his father's funeral after news that he could potentially be allowed a temporary release to do so was met with public outcry on social media. Instead he was allowed to send a floral tribute.

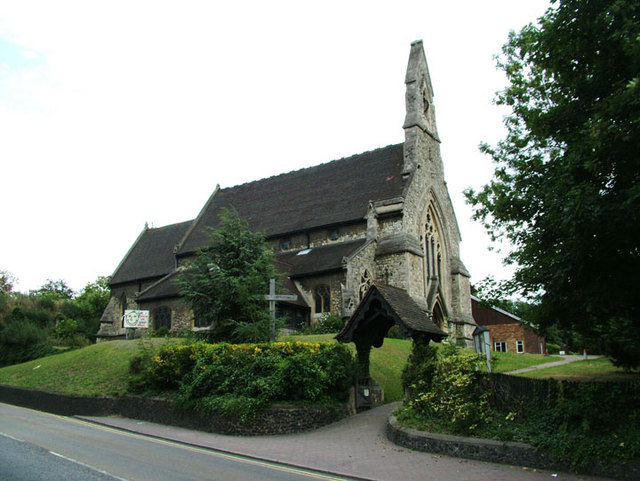
St Mary's Church, Greenhithe stands across London Road from the alley in which the murder took place.

In December 1996 Ash-Smith pleaded guilty at Maidstone Crown Court to the 1988 and 1995 attacks. He was sentenced to life imprisonment with a 15 to 21 year minimum term. (He is still serving that sentence.) These prior crimes – all involve lone women, knives and frenzied violence – established a clear modus operandi. In fact, at the 2014 trial the prosecutor noted Ash-Smith had “planned a number of such attacks” and only Claire was killed among them.

== Breakthrough evidence and charging (2013–2014) ==
In September 2013, as part of a renewed cold-case review, Kent detectives searched Ash-Smith’s family home. They found a copy of a local newspaper marking the first anniversary of Claire’s death – a macabre “trophy” Ash-Smith had kept. More importantly, a prison confession emerged. Between 2001–2003 Ash-Smith had shared a cell in Wakefield Prison with convicted offender Stefan Dubois. Dubois testified that Ash-Smith told him he once saw a girl on a zebra crossing and then “snapped and attacked” her. Claire Tiltman was the only one of Ash-Smith’s known victims to have used a pedestrian crossing, making this detail uniquely identifying.

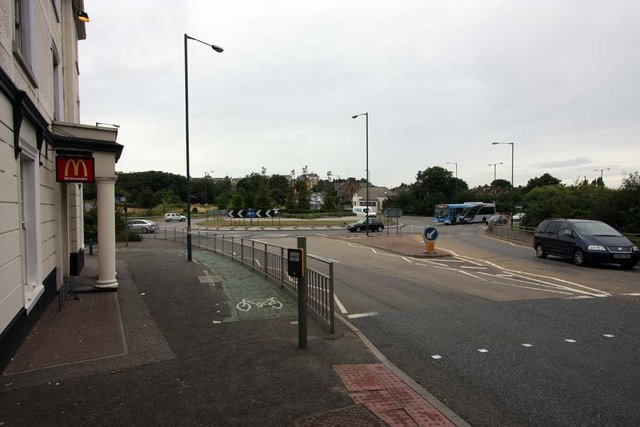
While in prison, Ash-Smith told another inmate that he had attacked a girl who he had seen crossing the road on a zebra crossing. This was crucial in helping convict him, as Tiltman had crossed the road at this crossing before Ash-Smith stabbed her, while there were no crossings near to the sites of his other attacks.

Investigators also re-checked Ash-Smith’s timeline: on 19 Jan 1993 he had telephoned police claiming to be passing the British Legion club at “about 6.30pm” (when Claire was already dead) – an alibi that quickly unraveled. With no DNA or forensic trace linking Ash-Smith, the case rested on Dubois’s testimony plus Ash-Smith’s own admissions from prior crimes (the diaries and confessions to 1988/1995 attacks) and the known facts of the case. Crucially, changes in the law allowed this “bad character” evidence to be used. The Criminal Justice Act 2003 permits jurors to hear a defendant’s past convictions and admissions, which had previously been inadmissible. Armed with Dubois’s testimony and supporting evidence, police submitted their findings to the Crown Prosecution Service, which announced on 12 February 2014 that Ash-Smith would be charged with Claire’s murder.

== Trial, verdict, and sentence ==
Ash-Smith’s trial took place at Inner London Crown Court in Southwark in late 2014. Prosecutor Brian Altman QC portrayed Ash-Smith as a “ruthless predatory armed killer” who “took pleasure” in violence. The Crown’s case highlighted the prison confession, Ash-Smith’s matching jacket and car details, the false alibi call, and the pattern of his previous attacks. Ash-Smith himself testified (describing himself as “an animal” with those earlier victims) but insisted he had not murdered Claire. His barrister sought to cast doubt by pointing to serial killer Robert Napper, who murdered multiple women in London around 1992–93. The defense also tried to discredit Dubois’s account and argued there was no direct physical evidence against Ash-Smith.

The judge (Mr Justice Sweeney) allowed the bad-character evidence – marking one of the earliest high- profile applications of the 2003 Act’s provisions in London. Jurors heard at length about Ash-Smith’s 1988 and 1995 convictions and the “assault plans” he had written. After five weeks of evidence, the jury took just three hours to convict Ash-Smith of murder. On 11 December 2014 he was found guilty of killing Claire Tiltman. The next day, Mr Justice Sweeney sentenced him to life imprisonment with a minimum term of 21 years. (Under the old sentencing guidelines, 21 years was noted as roughly equivalent to what he would have served if Claire’s case had been prosecuted in 1993.) Sweeney remarked that the murder was “premeditated” and Claire had been chosen as a vulnerable victim. Ash-Smith, already 46 at sentencing, reacted impassively as the life term was imposed. A number of Claire's school friends were in the gallery to hear the sentencing.

Following his conviction, detectives branded Ash-Smith as 'pure evil' and said he should never be freed. Jaswant Narwal, CPS South East Chief Crown Prosecutor, called the case "one of the most complex cases" CPS South East has dealt with in recent years.

In November 2015, Ash-Smith launched an appeal against his conviction on the grounds that Mr Justice Sweeney had wrongly allowed "gravely prejudicial" material to go before the jury. However, it was rejected by Lord Justice Davis and two other Lords Justice of Appeal.

He is currently imprisoned at HMP Durham.

== Community and media reaction ==
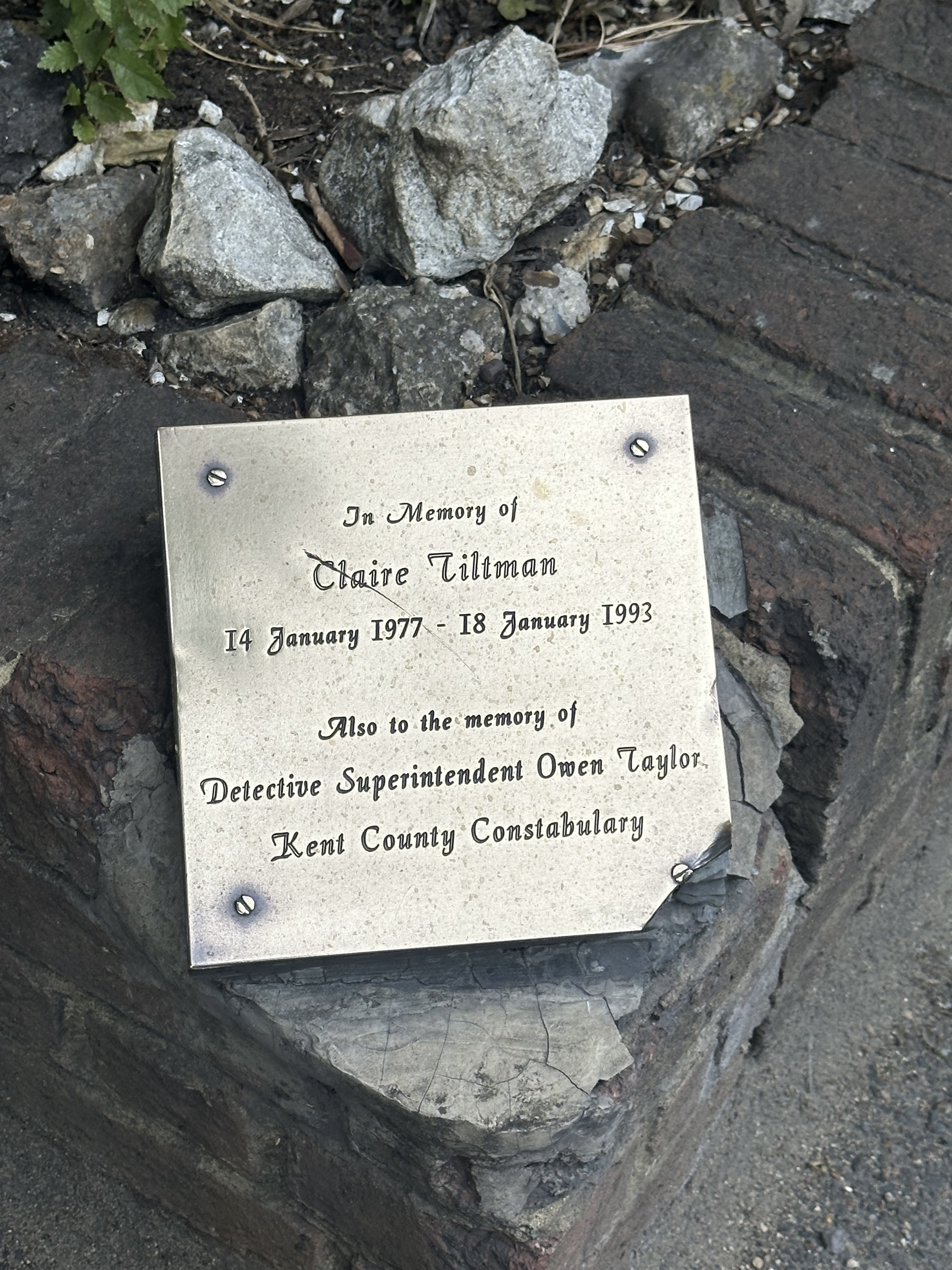

Claire Tiltman’s murder and the long wait for justice drew intense public attention. In the immediate aftermath (January 1993), local residents laid hundreds of floral tributes at the scene. The story appeared on national news and front pages as police launched appeals. Over the years, the case remained in the public eye through vigils and campaigns. Claire’s school friends – Joanne Roberts, Vicki Atkins and Lisa Gribbin – refused to let her memory fade. They organized annual memorials (for example, a candlelit walk on the 20th anniversary) and kept pressure on law enforcement. Clifford and Linda Tiltman became advocates for solving the crime: notably, on the 19th anniversary Cliff gave a heartfelt appeal on television. Linda died of cancer in March 2008 and Cliff in September 2012; both had insisted their ashes not be buried with Claire’s until the killer was caught. They had no other children. Roger Tiltman, the brother of Clifford, said that his brother and sister-in-law were wracked with guilt at her killing and the stress of it drove them both to early graves. In a victim impact statement, her uncle said: "The fact they allowed her out on the night of her death caused them a massive amount of pain.”

Media coverage resumed fervently once Ash-Smith was charged and during the 2014 trial. National outlets (BBC, The Guardian, Evening Standard, ITV, etc.) covered the proceedings, emphasizing the “22- year fight” for justice. After the 11 Dec conviction, friends spoke publicly of relief. On Good Morning Britain, Claire’s friends said they had “never given up hope” of justice. They even brought a photo of Claire’s late parents into the courtroom each day as a tribute. An ITV report noted Claire’s friends were “obviously really relieved” by the verdict, even as they mourned that it could never bring Claire back. In Greenhithe, a modest memorial remains at the spot where Claire’s body was found, and candlelit vigils continue to be held annually in her honor.

=== Key individuals and agencies ===
- Kent Police – Cold Case Investigation Team: Detective Sergeant Rob Vinson (Senior Investigating Officer) led the renewed inquiry. Kent’s Major Crime and Cold Case units, with support from Home Office forensic experts (e.g. Dr Robert Green’s team), drove the review of old evidence.
- Crown Prosecution Service (CPS): Prosecutor Brian Altman QC (CPS Complex Casework) and his team prepared the case against Ash-Smith. They applied the new 2003 criminal evidence laws that allowed Ash-Smith’s past convictions to be used.
- Judiciary: Mr Justice Sweeney presided over the 2014 trial and sentencing. His sentencing remarks detail Ash-Smith’s crimes and the reasoning for the 21-year minimum.
- Witness Stefan Dubois: A fellow inmate at HMP Wakefield, Dubois provided the crucial testimony about Ash-Smith’s confession (zebra crossing story).
- “Justice for Claire” Campaigners: Joanne Roberts, Vicki Atkins, Lisa Gribbin and other friends of Claire tirelessly lobbied police and media. They organized vigils and memorials, and attended every day of the trial, carrying Claire’s photo in court.

== Commemorations ==
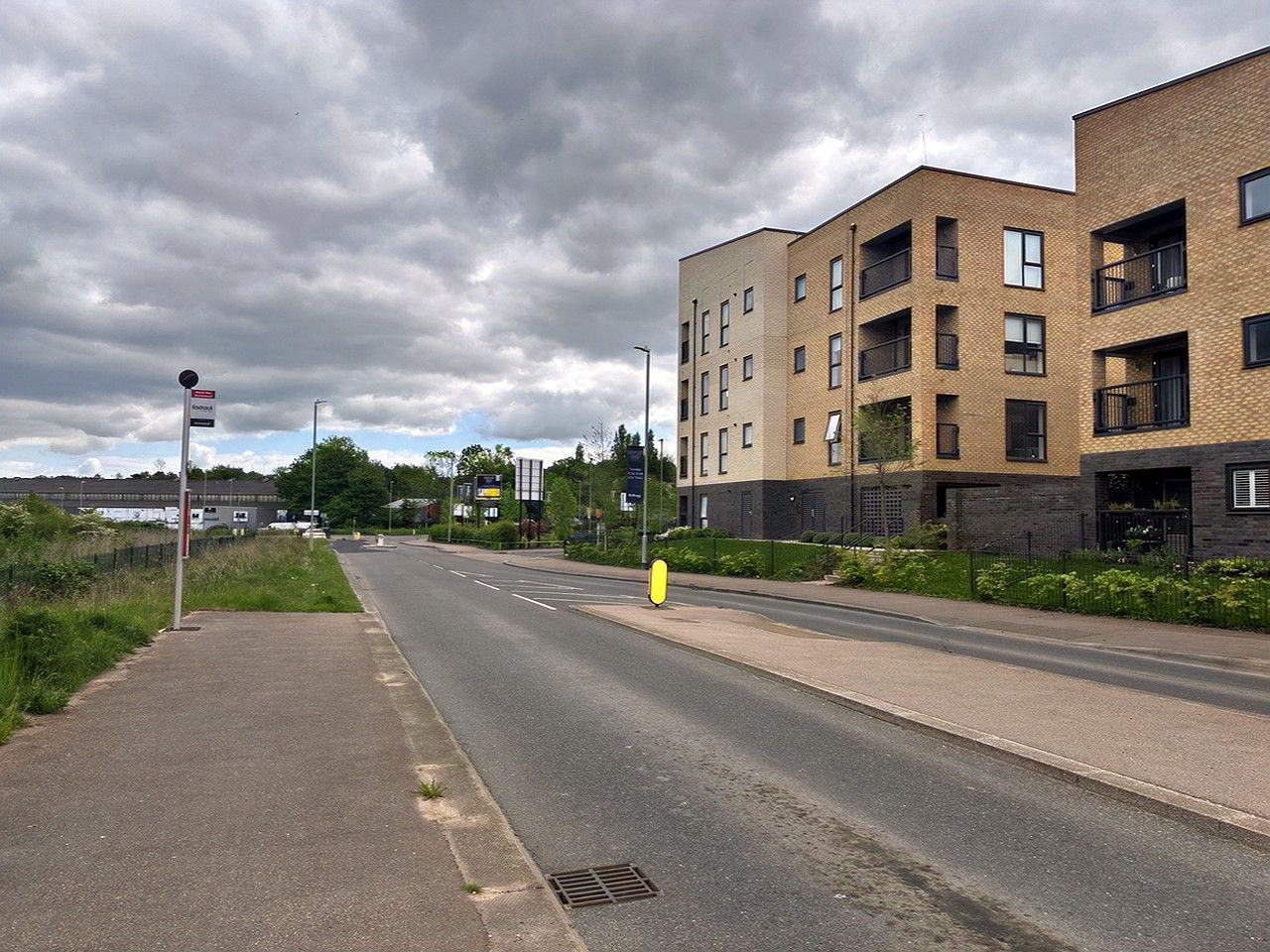
Tiltman Avenue, photographed 5th May 2025.

Several commemorative gestures have been made to honor the memory of Claire Tiltman

- Tiltman Avenue: In April 2016, Dartford Borough Council approved the renaming of Fastrack Manor Way in Greenhithe to "Tiltman Avenue" to honor Claire Tiltman. The decision followed a campaign by local residents and friends, aiming to ensure that Claire's legacy would be remembered within the community.
- Claire Tiltman Centre: Stone Parish Council named a new community facility in Cotton Lane, Stone, as the "Claire Tiltman Centre." The centre officially opened in May 2022, providing a space for community events and services.
- Memorial Plaque: A memorial plaque was installed near the site of Claire's murder on London Road, Greenhithe. However, in July 2003, the plaque was vandalized and removed from its stone base.
- Candlelit Vigils: On the 20th anniversary of Claire's death in January 2013, friends and community members organized a candlelit walk retracing her final steps. The vigil began opposite The Bull at Horns Cross and concluded with a short service at St Mary's Church.
- Claire Tiltman Investigative Award: In April 2016, Kent Police introduced the "Claire Tiltman Investigative Award," presented to officers demonstrating outstanding work with vulnerable victims and witnesses. The inaugural award was given to Detective Constable Shelley Rainer during Kent Police's annual awards ceremony.

== Justice for Claire campaign ==
After Claire Tiltman's murder remained unsolved for nearly two decades—and following the death of her father, Cliff Tiltman, in 2012—a group of six of her school friends launched the Justice for Claire campaign. Founding members included Lisa Gribbin and Joanne Roberts, who attended school with Claire. The aim of the campaign was to maintain public pressure on authorities and keep Claire's case in the public eye.

The campaign launched a dedicated website, justiceforclaire.co.uk, which served as a central page for organizing events, sharing updates, and appealing for information. In January 2013, the group organized a candlelit walk on the 20th anniversary of Claire’s death. The walk retraced Claire’s final steps and ended with a memorial service at St Mary’s Church.

The following year, to mark the 21st anniversary, the campaign hosted a charity concert at Dartford’s Princes Park Stadium. The event featured an ABBA tribute band and raised funds for the Fire Fighters Charity and Ellenor Lions Hospice. Tickets were priced at £15 and sold through the campaign’s website.

Community engagement was a strong component of the campaign. Local businesses, such as the Asda supermarket in Greenhithe, supported the group through initiatives like the Green Token scheme. The campaign also attracted national attention, and then–Prime Minister David Cameron reportedly offered renewed government support following appeals from the group.

Following the 2014 conviction of Colin Ash-Smith for Claire's murder, the Justice for Claire campaign wound down. The website was taken offline, and the group ceased public activity after its primary objective had been achieved. The last known online working archive before the website ceased operations was recorded on July 5th, 2014.

== In popular culture ==
Ash-Smith's conviction was among the cases featured in the BBC Four three-part documentary The Prosecutors, which showcases the CPS's work and the legal procedures behind a prosecution. The documentary was commended by the Radio Times as well as one of Tiltman's school friends who had testified at Ash-Smith's trial.

In 2018, a documentary on Tiltman's case was released as part of Crime + Investigation's series Murdertown. The episode, the second episode of series one, was titled "Dartford".
