= John Vickers (criminal) =

British criminal executed for murder

- Born: John Wilson Vickers; Penrith, Cumbria
- Died: 23 July 1957; HM Prison Durham, Durham, England
- Cause of death: Execution by hanging
- Occupation: Thief
- Motive: Robbery
- Conviction: Capital murder
- Penalty: Death

Details
- Victims: Jane Duckett
- Country: United Kingdom

John Wilson Vickers (died 23 July 1957) was a criminal from the United Kingdom who became the first person to be executed under the terms of the Homicide Act 1957. He had been convicted of the fatal bludgeoning of an elderly woman named Jane Duckett during a robbery in Carlisle. Vickers' appeal on the grounds that he had not intended to kill Duckett has become a leading case on the degree of malice needed to prove murder in English law.

Vickers was born in the town of Penrith, Cumbria. He had been a career thief from the age of eleven and was known to the police. On either the fifteenth or fourteenth of April 1957, Vickers broke into the cellar of a shop in Carlisle owned by 72-year-old Jane Duckett, intending to steal money. Duckett interrupted Vickers during the robbery, prompting Vickers to violently beat her before fleeing without taking anything. Duckett later died of her injuries; her body was discovered when neighbours alerted the police that her shop had not opened that day.

Within several days, Vickers was identified by several scratches left on his face during his struggle with Duckett and charged with murder. Although the felony murder rule had been abolished by the Homicide Act 1957, the prosecution argued that "if a man of 22 kicks and punches an old lady of 72 he intends to cause her grievous bodily harm. If you are satisfied that Vickers did this, then he murdered her during the commission of a theft." Vickers was convicted and sentenced to death. He appealed his conviction, arguing that there was no "malice aforethought" in the killing, but the Court of Appeal rejected his arguments. According to Lord Goddard, "[malice aforethought] has always been defined in English law as either an express intention to kill...or implied where, by a voluntary act, the accused intended to cause grievous bodily harm to the victim, and the victim died as the result." Vickers was executed by Harry Allen at HM Prison Durham on 23 July 1957.
