= Low Moorsley =

Coordinates: 54°49′N 1°28′W

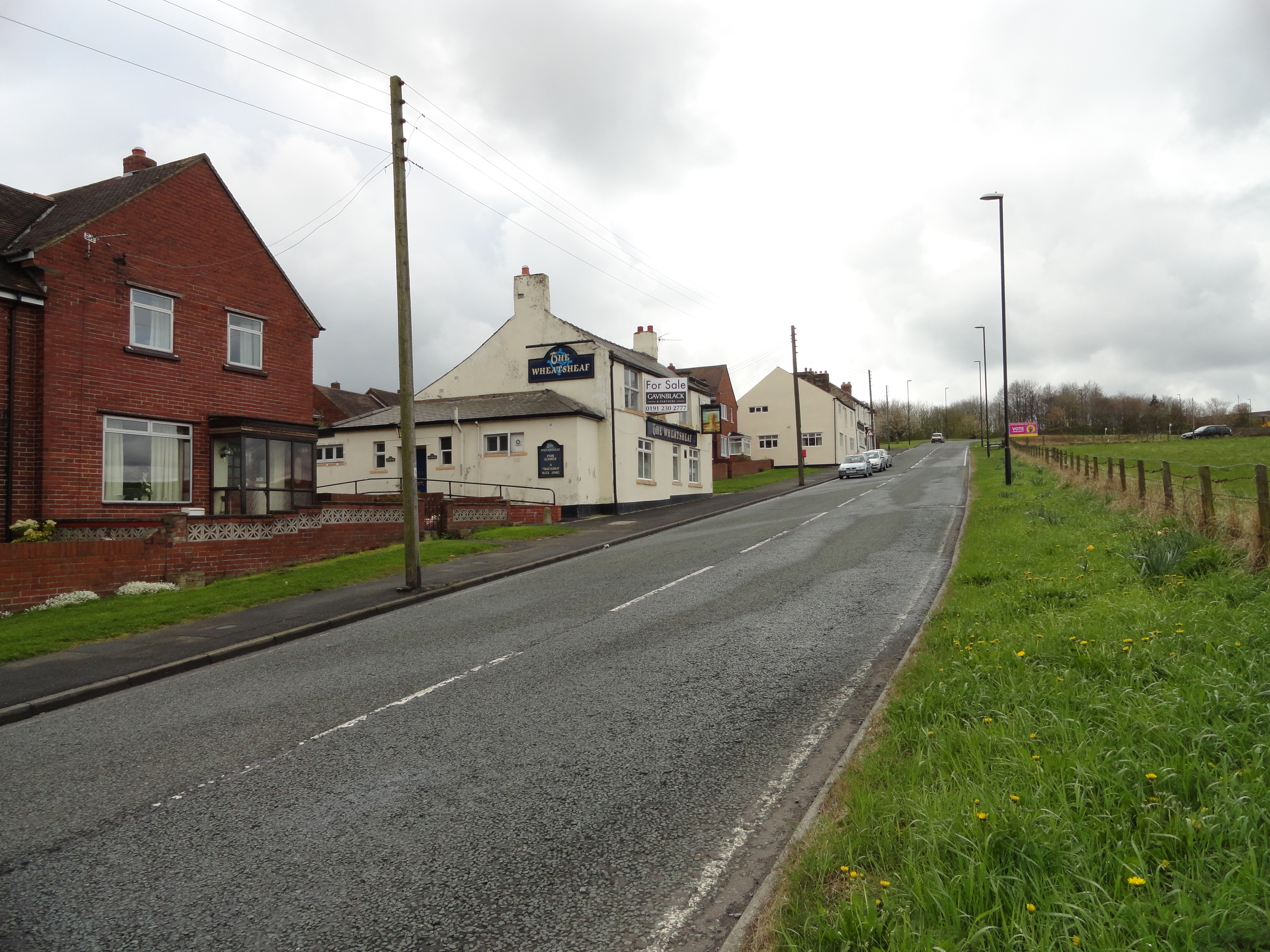
- The Wheatsheaf

- Location within Tyne and Wear
- Civil parish: Hetton
- Metropolitan borough: Sunderland
- Metropolitan county: Tyne and Wear
- Region: North East
- Country: England
- Sovereign state: United Kingdom
- Police: Northumbria
- Fire: Tyne and Wear
- Ambulance: North East

Low Moorsley is a small village just outside Hetton-le-Hole, in the civil parish of Hetton, in the Sunderland district, in the county of Tyne and Wear, England.

It was the birthplace of serial killer, Mary Ann Cotton (1832–1873).
