= Courts of the County Palatine of Durham =

The palatine courts of Durham were a set of courts that exercised jurisdiction within the County Palatine of Durham. The bishop purchased the wapentake of Sadberge in 1189, and Sadberge's initially separate institutions were eventually merged with those of the County Palatine.

The Bishop of Durham was the supreme judge of all the courts of Durham, both ecclesiastical and temporal, by virtue of the privileges of his palatinate.

== Free courts ==
The Court of Pleas probably developed from the free court of the Bishop of Durham. There was also a free court of the Prior of Durham.

== Chancery ==
This court was abolished by the Courts Act 1971.

== Courts of common law ==
=== Court of Pleas ===
This court was abolished by the Supreme Court of Judicature Act 1873.

=== Assizes ===
The Assizes for the county of Durham were held twice a year, about the first week in August and last in February. Two Judges attended in summer, but only one in winter. The assizes sat at the Shire Hall (also known as the County House) beside Palace Green until 1811, when they moved to the new courthouse at the head of Old Elvet. Mary Ann Cotton was tried at the Durham Assizes.

The judges of assize who sat in a county palatine, formerly sat by virtue of a special commission from the owner of the franchise, and under the seal thereof, and not by the usual commission under the Great Seal of England (3 Com 79) Section 99 of Supreme Court of Judicature Act 1873 provided that "From and after the commencement of this Act, the Counties Palatine of Lancaster and Durham shall respectively cease to be Counties Palatine, so far as respects the issue of Commissions of Assize, or other like Commissions, but not further or otherwise; and all such Commissions may be issued for the trial of all causes and matters within such counties respectively in the same manner in all respects as in any other counties of England and Wales."

== County Court ==
This court was abolished by section 2 of the Durham (County Palatine) Act 1836.

== Quarter sessions ==
The General Quarter Sessions, for the county of Durham, were held in the Court House, on the Monday in each week, appointed by statute, to inquire into "all manner of felonies, poisonings, sorceries, trespasses, &c." Sessions weeks were the first week after Epiphany, the first week after the close of Easter, the first whole week after St. Thomas a Becket, and the first whole week after 11 October. By order of Court, all Justices' Clerks were to transmit their informations, convictions, depositions, recognizances, &c. to the office of the Clerk of the Peace on or before the Wednesday preceding each Session; and all appeals and traverses (except such as came within the provisions of the statute 60 Geo 3 c 4) had to be entered with the Deputy Clerk of the Peace before twelve o'clock on the first day of the Sessions. And no traverse, (except as aforesaid) could be tried unless the defendant had made application to the Deputy Clerk of the Peace for a venire, and shall also have given notice of trial to the prosecutor, on or before Saturday se’nnight preceding the Sessions. The Court, in the first place, proceeded to call over the names of the Chief Constables, and examine them as to arrears (if any) of the county rates. Motions of counsel were then heard. The surveyors of the highways of townships, and other persons under any indictment or presentment, for not repairing highways, or for nuisances thereon (not previously disposed of on motion), were then called over and fined, or otherwise dealt with, according to the standing orders of the Court. The Court then proceeded to hear appeals against orders of removal, and such other matters as did not require the attendance of jurymen. All jurors, prosecutors of indictments, and witnesses on prosecutions, and also all defendants in traverses, with their witnesses, and all persons bound by recognizances to prosecute or give evidence on, or to answer any indictment to be tried at the Sessions, were required to attend on the second day of the Sessions, at nine o'clock in the morning. And all recognisances were estreated unless the persons bound personally appeared and discharged the same. An adjournment was held on the first Saturday in every month, at the County Courts.

At the Durham Quarter Sessions, in January 1690, the following resolution was made: "The Justices resolved to give their wages towards procuring a plate or plates to be run for upon Durham Moor; and Mr. Mayor, chairman of the quarter sessions, was desired to communicate the same resolution to the bishop of Durham." Signed, George Morland, and nine others. Rice says of this that the justices "probably resolved upon a display of generosity unique in history."

== Petty sessions ==
Petty Sessions for the city of Durham were held in the County Court-house every Saturday, when two or more of the Magistrates attended for the administration of justice.

== Halmot or manor courts ==
A Court Leet, View of Frank pledge, and Court Baron, for the city of Durham and borough of Framwellgate, was held at the Guildhall, or Toll booth, before the steward, or his deputy in his absence, twice a year, a month after Easter, and Michaelmas, when all the inhabitants and residents within the manor were required to attend, and to do their suit and service to the lord of the manor, upon pain of amerciament. The town clerk granted the summons for the recovery of debts under 40s in this court. There were also numerous other courts in the different manors of the diocese, some of which were copyhold courts, others were only courts baron for the redress of the tenants' grievances; some were courts leet, and some few courts for the recovery of debts and damages under 40s held according to the various local customs. The Halmote Court office was on the intersection of Owengate and North Bailey. The records of this Halmote Court are from 1345 onwards.

== Prerogative courts ==
There were courts of forest and marshalsea.

== Vice admiralty court ==
There was a vice admiralty court from the seventeenth century. It appears to have fallen into disuse after 1717. It sat at Sunderland.
