= Shire Hall, Durham =

County building in Durham, County Durham, England

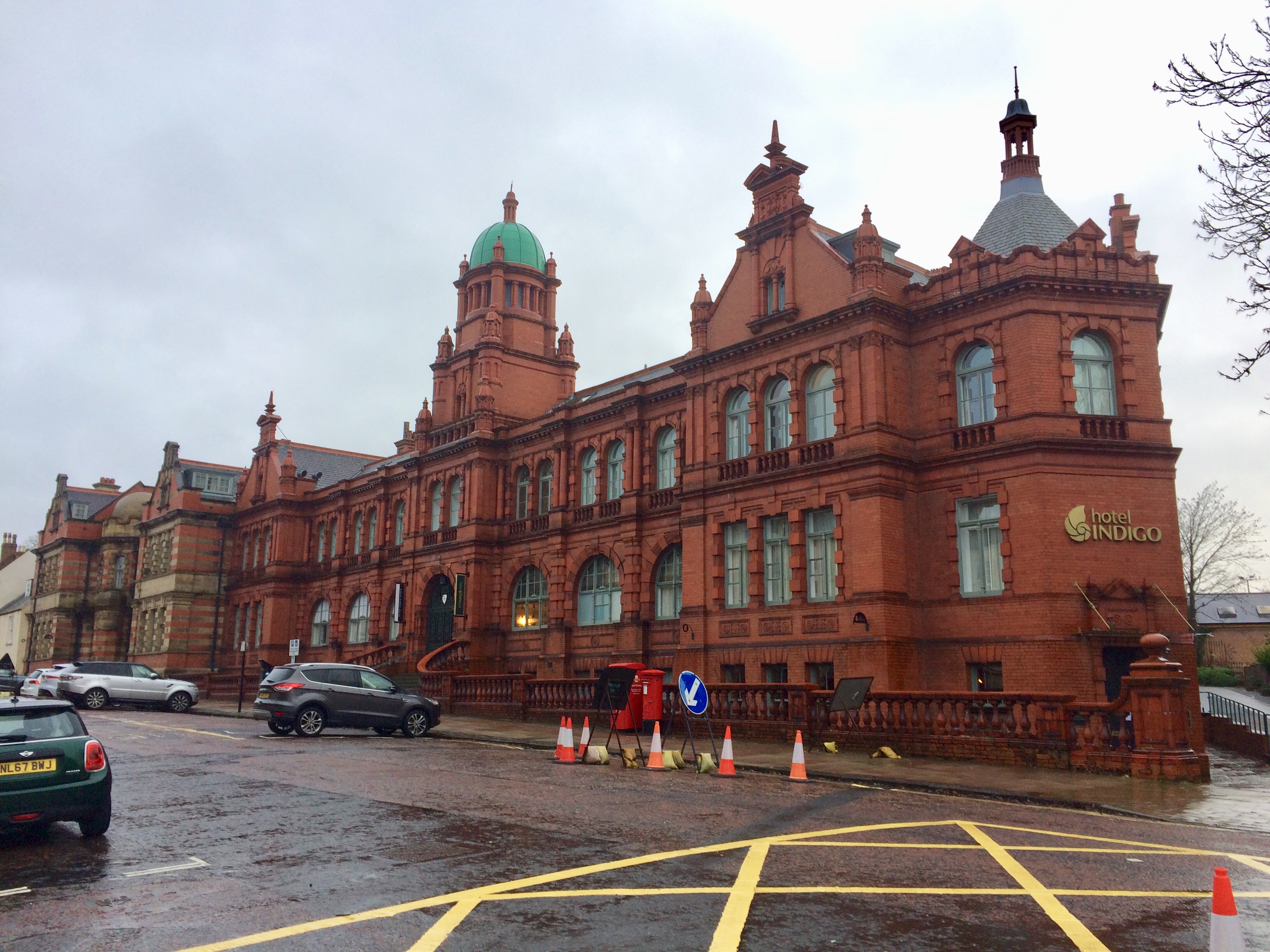

- Location within County Durham
- 54.7749°N 1.5703°W
- Location: Elvet, Durham, County Durham

History
- Built: 1898

Site notes
- Architect(s): Harry Barnes and Frederick Coates
- Architectural style: Baroque Revival
- Owner: Hotel Indigo
- Website: Hotel Indigo Durham

Listed Building – Grade II
- Official name: Old Shire Hall (University Office)
- Designated: 10 March 1988
- Reference no.: 1310562

The Old Shire Hall, also known as the Hotel Indigo Durham, is a Grade II listed building in Old Elvet, Durham. The former municipal building was the headquarters of Durham County Council from 1898 to 1963 and has been a hotel since 2018.

== History ==
In the 18th century the justices held the assizes in the Shire Hall (also known as the County House) beside Palace Green; they then moved to a new courthouse at the head of Old Elvet in 1811. Following the implementation of the Local Government Act 1888, which established county councils in every county, it became necessary to find a meeting place for Durham County Council. County leaders decided that the courthouse was not suitable for the purpose and chose to procure county council offices nearby: the site they selected in Old Elvet had previously been occupied by a row of large residential properties.

The foundation stone for the new building was laid by the Lord Lieutenant of Durham, the Earl of Durham in April 1896. It was designed by Harry Barnes and Frederick Coates in the Baroque Revival style, built by David and John Rankin at a cost of £14,000 and was officially opened by Alderman Samuel Storey on 26 July 1898. The design involved a symmetrical main frontage with nine bays in red terracotta facing onto Old Elvet with the end bays slightly projected forwards; the central section, which also slightly projected forwards, featured an arched doorway on the ground floor with a wrought-iron grill; there was a pair of round headed windows on the first floor and a tower with a copper-clad dome at roof level. Internally, the principal room was the council chamber. The interior is magnificently decorated using Burmantofts tiles.

A new wing, banded in stone and brick, which added an extra three bays to the east of the main building, was completed in 1905. A memorial to county council staff who had died in the First and Second World Wars was unveiled by the Chairman of the County Council, Councillor Thomas Benfold, on 10 November 1948.

Nikolaus Pevsner did not take a favourable view of the building in his 1953 Buildings of England volume, where he described the building as a "deplorable" building "with monumental intentions and disastrous effects" whose "cursedly imperishable red Victorian brick... is such crushing proof of technical proficiency and aesthetic dumbness".

After the County Council moved to County Hall at Aykley Heads in October 1963, the Shire Hall served as the administrative headquarters of Durham University until September 2012 when the University moved to the Mountjoy site, in the Palatine Centre on Stockton Road. The Shire Hall then stood vacant until it was converted for use as a hotel by Brims of Sunderland to the plans of HL Architects: it re-opened as the Hotel Indigo in March 2018.
