= Carnkie murders =

2000 mass murder in Cornwall, England

- Location: Cornwall, England
- Date: C. August 2000
- Attack type: Mass murder, Pedicide, Matricide, Familicide, Filicide
- Deaths: 5
- Perpetrator: Lee Ford

In August 2000, Lee Ford, an unemployed builder and roofer, murdered his wife, Lesley, and his four stepchildren at their home in Carnkie, a village near Helston, Cornwall, and then attempted to conceal the bodies. After telling neighbours, and the children's school, that Lesley had left and taken the children with her, Ford was arrested in October 2000 after Lesley's brother reported her missing, and police subsequently found the bodies of his victims. Ford confessed to the killings, but refused to give police a motive for the murders. It is believed, however, that Lesley had become aware of the sexual abuse he was inflicting on one of her daughters. In May 2001, Ford pleaded guilty to the murders at Bristol Crown Court and was sentenced to five terms of life imprisonment.

== Murders ==
Ford committed the murders on or around 30 August 2000, after arguing with his wife, Lesley, who had threatened to stop him seeing the two children he had fathered with her. After striking her in the face with a baseball bat, Ford went to the garage, where he found a rope. He then used it to strangle Lesley, and over the following 24 hours, killed Lesley's four children, Sarah-Jane Tranter, aged 17, Anne Marie Tranter, aged 16, Steven Tranter, aged 14, and Craig Tranter, aged 13, in the same manner. He spared the lives of his own two children. Ford placed the bodies in a woodshed located in the property's back garden, wrapping them in sheets and covering them with lime, and subsequently attempted to conceal the murders by telling neighbours and the local school his wife had left him and taken the children, while sending his own children to stay with relatives.

== Arrest and trial ==
Ford was visited by police officers several weeks later, after Lesley's brother contacted them to report the family missing. Ford was panicked by the visit, and moved the remains of his two stepdaughters, reburying them at the edge of a nearby field. He was arrested on 4 October after going on the run, when the bodies were found. Ford confessed to the murders, telling police he was not sure why he had carried out the killings, and had "flipped". Police suspected that Ford had been sexually abusing his eldest stepdaughter, Sarah-Jane, and that this had been the source of his argument with Lesley. In May 2001, Ford pleaded guilty to five counts of murder at Bristol Crown Court and was given five sentences of life imprisonment.

As of April 2024, Ford was being held at HM Prison Durham. He will become eligible to be considered for parole in October 2027. In October 2021, the family and friends of his victims started an online petition to prevent his release.

== Aftermath ==
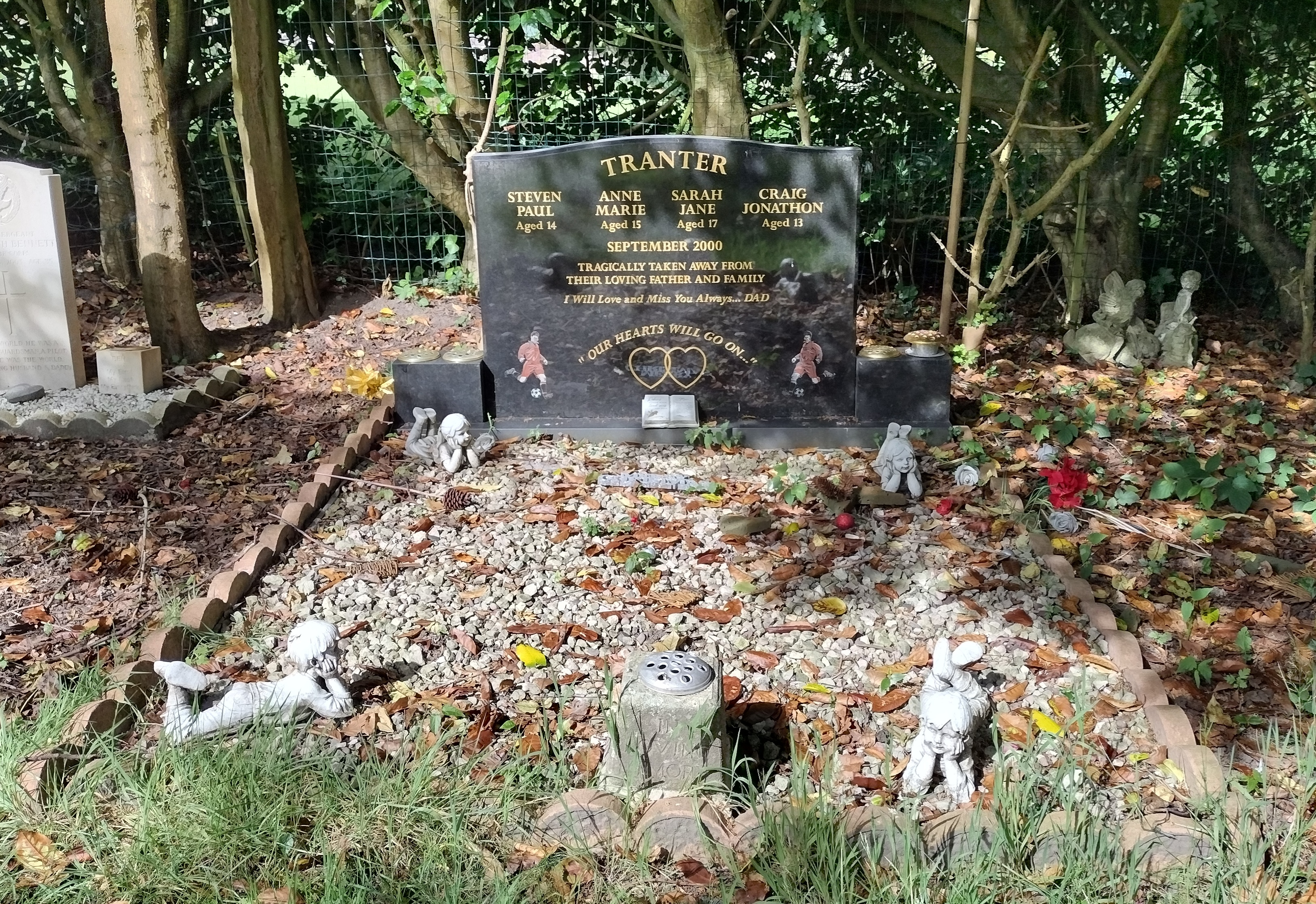
Gravestone of the four Tranter children

A memorial to the children was later unveiled at the school they attended in Helston. The children are buried in St John's Church, Lawley.
