= Benjamin Earl (priest) =

Benjamin Earl, O.P.
- Born: Canterbury, Kent, England
- Education: University of Oxford
- Occupations: priest, canon lawyer
- Religion: Christianity
- Church: Catholic Church
- Congregations served: Blackfriars, Oxford, St. Cuthbert's Church, Durham, Santa Sabina
- Offices held: Bursar of Blackfriars, Oxford, Prior of St. Cuthbert's Church, Durham, Durham University Catholic Chaplain, Procurator General of the Order of Preachers
- Title: Procurator General of the Order of Preachers

Benjamin Earl, O.P. is an English Catholic Priest, Dominican Friar, and Canon lawyer. He is the Procurator General of the Order of Preachers —the 800-year old mendicant order colloquially known as the Dominicans.

== Education and career ==
Earl was born and raised in Canterbury, in the United Kingdom.

He read Mathematics, followed by an MSc in Computation, at St John's College, University of Oxford before entering the Dominican order, whose English motherhouse is located in Oxford, as a novice in 1997. As a novice, Earl studied Philosophy and Theology for ordination, before moving to the Dominican Friary of Santa Sabina in Rome to pursue a degree in Canon Law and to work alongside the Procurator General of the order.

In 2006, Earl returned to Oxford, serving as Bursar and as a lecturer on Canon Law at Blackfriars Hall – the English Dominican motherhouse, and later as Bursar for the Province of England, Scotland and Wales —all the while becoming an acclaimed preacher among the English Dominicans and in the wider English Catholic community.

In 2012, Earl was called to be the parish priest and Prior of a new Dominican house at St. Cuthbert's Church in Durham as well as Chaplain of Durham University's Catholic Chaplaincy and Catholic Society. Additionally, he served on liturgical and economic commissions for the English Dominicans, and as a judge on the diocesan tribunal of the Diocese of Hexham and Newcastle.

Since 2016, Earl has served, at the behest of Bruno Cadoré, Master of the Order of Preachers, as Procurator General of the Order at Santa Sabina in Rome, where he has continued the preaching key to the Order alongside his work in canon law.
