= Murder of Preston Davey =

2023 murder of infant in England

Preston Davey
- Photograph of Preston Davey
- Born: 16 June 2022; Wythenshawe Hospital, Greater Manchester, England
- Died: 27 July 2023 (aged 1); Blackpool Victoria Hospital, Lancashire, England
- Cause of death: Murder (Intentional acute upper airway obstruction)
- Parents: Sarah Davey (biological mother); Gary Nolan (biological father)

Preston Elijah Davey (16 June 2022 – 27 July 2023) was a one-year-old British infant who was murdered after being subjected to prolonged child abuse over a period of four months by Jamie Varley, a former secondary school teacher, and his partner John McGowan-Fazakerley, a sales manager in the finance sector. The couple were Preston's prospective adopters and were caring for him under an adoptive placement at their home in Blackpool, Lancashire.

== Background ==
Preston was born at Wythenshawe Hospital on 16 June 2022. At five days old, he was placed into emergency foster care, where he remained for the first nine months of his life.

Jamie Varley and John McGowan-Fazakerley met in Manchester in 2018 and later entered into a relationship. They were approved as prospective adopters by Adoption Now on 6 January 2023. Following an adoption panel's approval in March 2023, Preston was placed in their care after a period of introductions. He lived with the couple for almost four months, before his death on 27 July 2023, aged 13 months.

== Abuse and murder ==
During the four months Preston lived with Varley and McGowan-Fazakerley, he was subjected to repeated physical, psychological and sexual abuse. In messages sent to friends and colleagues, Varley complained that he was struggling with parenthood and sleep deprivation, describing Preston as "annoying" and making disturbing comments about harming or drowning him. Investigators also recovered numerous photographs and videos from the defendants' mobile phones, including indecent images of Preston and footage documenting injuries and incidents later relied upon by the prosecution. These included videos showing Preston being deliberately frightened, spun at excessive speed on a playground teacup while visibly distressed, and draped over the bars of his cot with his lips appearing blue.

Preston attended Blackpool Victoria Hospital on three occasions between May and July 2023. He was first taken to hospital after Varley reported that he had suffered breathing difficulties and a seizure. During a later attendance, hospital safeguarding staff contacted Lancashire Police after concerns were raised; however, no criminal investigation followed after medical staff advised there were no concerns of non-accidental injury.

On 6 July 2023, Preston was admitted with a fractured arm, for which Varley gave differing explanations to hospital staff, doctors and friends.

The prosecution alleged that on 23 July 2023 Preston was sexually assaulted by both defendants, with evidence recovered from Varley's mobile phone and forensic evidence from Preston's cot. Lancashire Police stated that injuries sustained during the assault were believed to have been a contributing factor in his death.

On 24 July 2023, Varley recorded a video showing Preston left alone in a bath for more than 14 minutes without his bath seat, during which he appeared distressed and repeatedly attempted to climb out.

On 27 July 2023, Varley was alone at the house with Preston during the afternoon while McGowan-Fazakerley was at work. During that time, Varley recorded a video at 4:45pm, showing Preston struggling to breathe. After McGowan-Fazakerley returned home, the pair immediately took Preston to Blackpool Victoria Hospital at 6:24pm, he was unconscious and in cardiac arrest. Preston was pronounced dead later that evening, at 7:20pm. Varley told medical staff and police that Preston had accidentally drowned after being left unattended in the bath, but this account was contradicted by the medical evidence. A Home Office post-mortem examination found that Preston had sustained 40 traumatic injuries while in the defendants' care, including at least 30 external bruises, internal injuries to his mouth, throat, anus, bowel and bladder, along with a healing non-accidental fracture to his left upper arm.

His cause of death was determined to be acute upper airway obstruction.

== Investigation, trial and sentencing ==
Following Preston Davey's death on 27 July 2023, Jamie Varley and John McGowan-Fazakerley were arrested on suspicion of child neglect after Varley told hospital staff at Blackpool Victoria Hospital and Lancashire Police that Preston had accidentally drowned after being left unattended in a bath. Medical evidence and a subsequent Home Office post-mortem examination contradicted that account.

Following receipt of the post-mortem findings, Varley was re-arrested on suspicion of murder, while McGowan-Fazakerley was arrested on suspicion of causing or allowing the death of a child and child neglect. Following consultation with the Crown Prosecution Service, both men were subsequently charged with multiple offences relating to Preston's abuse and death.

Following a seven-week trial at Preston Crown Court, the jury unanimously found both defendants guilty on all counts after deliberating for just over two days.

Varley was convicted of the murder of Preston Davey, two counts of sexual assault of a child under the age of 13, inflicting grievous bodily harm, four counts of child cruelty, ten counts of making indecent images of a child, two counts of possessing indecent images of a child and one count of distributing an indecent image of a child.

McGowan-Fazakerley was convicted of causing or allowing the death of a child, one count of sexual assault of a child under the age of 13 and two counts of child cruelty.

On 18 June 2026, Justice Mark Turner sentenced Varley to life imprisonment with a whole life order for the murder of Preston Davey. McGowan-Fazakerley was sentenced to 25 years' imprisonment for causing or allowing the death of a child.
