= Mary Ann Cotton =

English serial killer (1832–1873)

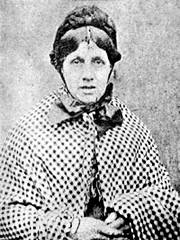
- Cotton, c. 1870
- Born: Mary Ann Robson; 31 October 1832; Low Moorsley, Hetton-le-Hole, County Durham, England
- Died: 24 March 1873 (aged 40); Durham Gaol, England
- Cause of death: Hanging
- Other name: The Black Widow
- Occupations: Dressmaker, nurse, housekeeper
- Conviction: Murder (1 count)
- Penalty: Death by hanging

Details
- Victims: Around 21, including 4 of her husbands and 11 of her 13 children
- Country: England
- Weapon: Arsenic
- Date apprehended: 18 July 1872

Mary Ann Cotton (née Robson; 31 October 1832 – 24 March 1873) was an English convicted murderer who was executed for poisoning her stepson. Despite her sole conviction for murder, she is believed to have been a serial killer who killed many others including 11 of her 13 children and three of her four husbands for their life insurance policies. Her preferred method of killing was poisoning with arsenic.

Cotton's undoing came after she tried to have the son of her deceased husband sent to a workhouse. When that failed, within days she told parish officials that the son, Charles Edward Cotton, had died. Investigations into her behaviour soon showed a pattern of deaths. The body of the stepson was examined and found to contain arsenic. Cotton was convicted of his murder and sentenced to death. She was hanged at Durham Gaol. She did not die on the gallows from the breaking of her neck but died by strangulation because the rope was set too short, possibly deliberately.

== Early life ==
Mary Ann Robson was born on 31 October 1832 at Low Moorsley, County Durham to Margaret, née Londsdale and Michael Robson, a colliery sinker; and baptised at St Mary's, West Rainton on 11 November. Her sister Margaret was born in 1834 but lived only a few months. Her brother Robert was born in 1835.

When Mary Ann was eight, her parents moved the family to the County Durham village of Murton. At the time of her trial, The Northern Echo published an article containing a description of Mary Ann as given by her childhood Wesleyan Sunday school superintendent at Murton, describing her as "a most exemplary and regular attender", "a girl of innocent disposition and average intelligence", and "distinguished for her particularly clean and tidy appearance."

Soon after the move, Mary Ann's father fell 150 feet (46 m) to his death down a mine shaft at Murton Colliery in February 1842. Her father's body was delivered to her mother in a sack bearing the stamp 'Property of the South Hetton Coal Company'. As the miner's cottage they inhabited was tied to Michael's job, the widow and children would have been evicted. In 1843, her mother married George Stott (1816–1895), also a miner. At 16, Mary Ann left home to become a nurse at the nearby village of South Hetton, in the home of Edward Potter, a manager at Murton Colliery. After all of the children had been sent to boarding school in Darlington over the next three years, she returned to her stepfather's home and trained as a dressmaker.

== Husband 1: William Mowbray ==
In 1852, 20-year-old Mary Ann married colliery labourer William Mowbray at Newcastle upon Tyne register office; they soon moved to South West England. At the time of her trial, there were reports of four or five of their children dying young while they were living away from County Durham. None of these deaths are registered, as although registration was compulsory at the time, the law was not enforced until 1874. The only birth recorded was that of their daughter Margaret Jane, born at St Germans in 1856.

William and Mary Ann moved back to North East England, where William worked as a fireman aboard a steam vessel sailing out of Sunderland, then as a colliery foreman. Another daughter, Isabella, was born in 1858, and Margaret Jane died in 1860. Another daughter, also named Margaret Jane, was born in 1861, and a son, John Robert William, was born in 1863 but died the next year from gastric fever.

William died of an intestinal disorder in January 1865. The lives of William and of their children were insured by the British and Prudential Insurance office and Mary Ann collected a payout of £35 on William's death (equivalent to £3,802 in 2025, about half a year's wages for a manual labourer at the time) and £2 5s for John Robert William.

== Husband 2: George Ward ==
Soon after Mowbray's death, Mary Ann moved to Seaham Harbour, County Durham, where she struck up a relationship with Joseph Nattrass. During this time, her 3 1/2-year-old daughter, the second Margaret Jane, died of typhus fever, leaving her with one child of up to nine she had borne. She returned to Sunderland and took up employment at the Sunderland Infirmary, House of Recovery for the Cure of Contagious Fever, Dispensary and Humane Society. She sent her surviving child, Isabella, to live with her mother.

One of her patients at the infirmary was engineer George Ward. They married at St Peter's Church, Monkwearmouth, on 28 August 1865. Ward continued to suffer ill health and died on 20 October 1866 after a long illness characterised by paralysis and intestinal problems. The cause of death recorded on his death certificate is that of English cholera and typhoid. The attending doctor later gave evidence that Ward had been very ill, yet he had been surprised that his death was so sudden. Once again, Mary Ann collected insurance money in respect of her husband's death.

== Husband 3: James Robinson ==
James Robinson was a shipwright at Pallion in Sunderland, whose wife Hannah had recently died. He hired Mary Ann as a housekeeper in November 1866. A month later, when James's baby John died of gastric fever, he turned to his housekeeper for comfort and she became pregnant. Then Mary Ann's mother, living in Seaham Harbour, County Durham, became ill with hepatitis, so Mary Ann immediately went to her. Although the mother began to recover, she also began to complain of stomach pains. She died at age 54 in the spring of 1867, nine days after Mary Ann's arrival. In 1867, Mary Ann's stepfather George Stott married his widowed neighbour, Hannah Paley.

Mary Ann's daughter Isabella Mowbray was brought back to the Robinson household and soon developed severe stomach pains and died, as did two of Robinson's children, Elizabeth and James. All three children were buried in the last week of April and the first week of May 1867. Mary Ann received a life-insurance payment of £5 10s 6d for Isabella.

Robinson married Mary Ann at St Michael's, Bishopwearmouth on 11 August 1867. Their first child Margaret Isabella (Mary Isabella on her baptismal record) was born that November, but she became ill and died in February 1868. Their second child George was born on 18 June 1869.

Robinson, meanwhile, had become suspicious of his wife's insistence that he insure his life; he discovered that she had run up debts of £60 behind his back and had stolen more than £50 that she had been expected to bank. Then he found that Mary Ann had been forcing his older children to pawn household valuables. He threw her out, retaining custody of their son George.

== Husband 4: Frederick Cotton ==
Mary Ann was desperate and living on the streets until her friend Margaret Cotton introduced her to her brother Frederick, a pitman and recent widower living in Walbottle, Northumberland, who had lost two of his four children. Margaret had acted as substitute mother for the remaining children, Frederick Jr. and Charles, but in late March 1870, she died from an undetermined stomach ailment, leaving Mary Ann to console the grieving Frederick Sr. Soon her twelfth pregnancy was underway.

Cotton and Mary Ann were bigamously married on 17 September 1870 at St Andrew's, Newcastle-Upon-Tyne and their son Robert was born early in 1871. Soon after, Mary Ann learnt that her former lover, Joseph Nattrass, was living 48 kilometres (30 mi) away in the County Durham village of West Auckland, and was no longer married. She rekindled the romance and persuaded her new family to move near him. Cotton died in December of that year, from "gastric fever." Insurance had been effected on his life and those of his sons.

== Two lovers ==
After Frederick's death, Nattrass soon became Mary Ann's lodger. She gained employment as a nurse to an excise officer recovering from smallpox. Popular cultural sources have called him John Quick-Manning, though there appears to be no trace of a John Quick-Manning in the records of the West Auckland Brewery or the National Archives. The census records, birth, death and marriage records also show no trace of him. However, Richard Quick Mann, a custom and excise man specialising in breweries, has been found in the records; this may be the real name of Mary Ann Cotton's lover. Soon, Mary became pregnant by him with her thirteenth child.

Frederick Jr. died in March 1872 and the infant Robert soon after. Then Nattrass became ill with gastric fever and died just after revising his will in Mary Ann's favour. The insurance policy Mary Ann had taken out on (the still living) Charles' life still awaited collection.

== Death of Charles Edward Cotton and inquest ==
Mary Ann's downfall came when a parish official, Thomas Riley, asked her to help nurse a woman who was ill with smallpox. She complained that the last surviving Cotton boy, Charles Edward, was in the way and asked Riley if he could be committed to the workhouse. Riley, who also served as West Auckland's assistant coroner, said she needed to accompany him. She told Riley that the boy was sickly and added: "I won’t be troubled long. He’ll go like all the rest of the Cottons."

Five days later, Mary Ann told Riley that the boy had died. Riley went to the village police and persuaded the doctor to delay writing a death certificate until the circumstances could be investigated.

Mary Ann's first visit after Charles' death was not to the doctor but to the insurance office. There, she discovered that no money would be paid out until a death certificate was issued. An inquest was held and the jury returned a verdict of natural causes. Mary Ann claimed to have used arrowroot to relieve his illness and said Riley had made accusations against her because she had rejected his advances.

Then the local newspapers latched on to the story and discovered Mary Ann had moved around northern England and lost three husbands, a lover, a friend, her mother, and 11 children, all of whom had died of stomach fevers.

== Arrest ==
Rumour gave rise to suspicion and scientific investigation. Doctor William Byers Kilburn, who had attended Charles, had kept samples, and tests showed they contained arsenic. He told the police, who arrested Mary Ann and procured an exhumation of Charles' body. She was charged with his murder, although the trial was delayed until after the delivery in Durham Gaol on 7 January 1873 of her thirteenth and final child, whom she named Margaret Edith Quick-Manning Cotton.

== Trial and execution ==
Cotton's trial began at Durham Assizes on 5 March 1873. The delay was caused by a problem in the selection of prosecution counsel. A Mr Aspinwall was first considered but the Attorney General, Sir John Duke Coleridge, whose decision it was, chose his friend and protégé Charles Russell. Russell's appointment over Aspinwall led to a question in the House of Commons. However, it was accepted, and Russell conducted the prosecution. The Cotton case was the first of several famous poisoning cases he would be involved in during his career, including those of Adelaide Bartlett and Florence Maybrick.

The defence in the case was handled by Thomas Campbell Foster, who argued during the trial that Charles had died from inhaling arsenic used as a dye in the green wallpaper of the Cotton home. The doctor testified that there was no other powder on the same shelf in the chemist's shop as the arsenic, only liquid; the chemist himself claimed that there were other powders. Campbell Foster argued that it was possible that the chemist had mistakenly used arsenic powder instead of bismuth powder (used to treat diarrhoea), when preparing a bottle for Cotton because he had been distracted by talking to other people. The jury retired for 90 minutes before returning a guilty verdict.

The Times correspondent reported on 20 March: "After conviction the wretched woman exhibited strong emotion but this gave place in a few hours to her habitual cold, reserved demeanour and while she harbours a strong conviction that the royal clemency will be extended towards her, she staunchly asserts her innocence of the crime that she has been convicted of." Several petitions were presented to the Home Secretary, but to no avail. Mary Ann Cotton was hanged at Durham County Gaol on 24 March 1873 by William Calcraft; she died, not from her neck breaking, but by strangulation caused by the rope being rigged too short, possibly deliberately.

Of Mary Ann's 13 children, only two survived her: Margaret Edith (1873–1954) and her son George from her marriage to James Robinson.

== Television and radio drama ==
In 2015 ITV filmed a three-part television drama, Dark Angel, starring Joanne Froggatt as Cotton. The series also featured Alun Armstrong, Jonas Armstrong and Emma Fielding. The first part of the dramatisation was broadcast on 31 October 2016, the second part was broadcast on 7 November. The drama was inspired by the book Mary Ann Cotton: Britain's First Female Serial Killer by David Wilson, a criminologist.

The Mary Ann Cotton case was partly dramatized in an episode of the 2022 BBC Radio podcast series Lucy Worsley's Lady Killers.

The case was also presented in an edition of the drama documentary series Martina Cole's Lady Killers in 2008.

The case also featured in an episode of Murder Maps presented by Nicholas Clay in 2019.

== See also ==
- List of serial killers before 1900
- List of serial killers in the United Kingdom
- Louise Porton – British woman who murdered her two children
