= RZ =

Rz or RZ can stand for:

== People ==
- Friederike Schwarz, Czech composer and journalist who used rz as a pseudonym)
- Robin Zander, American rock singer with Cheap Trick
- Richard Zednik, Slovak professional hockey player
- Roger Zelazny, American science fiction and fantasy writer
- Renée Zellweger, American actress
- Robert Zemeckis, American filmmaker
- Ron Ziegler, White House Press Secretary under Richard Nixon
- Raquel Zimmermann, Brazilian model
- Robert Zimmerman (disambiguation)
- Rachel Zoe, American fashion stylist
- Rob Zombie, an American heavy metal artist and film director

== Other uses ==
- ASEA Rz, a Swedish test locomotive
- Lexus RZ, an automobile
- Polikarpov R-Z, a Spanish Civil War-era Soviet reconnaissance bomber
- Red zone (gridiron football), an area of the field in gridiron football
- Redneck Zombies, a 1986 horror film
- Return-to-zero, in line coding
- Revolutionary Cells (German group), in German Revolutionäre Zellen, a militant leftist organisation active in West Germany between 1973 and 1995
- Rz (digraph), a digraph of the Polish alphabet
- RZ Resources, an Australian rare earths mining and processing company
