= Black Panther: Wakanda Forever =

2022 Marvel Studios film

- Theatrical release poster
- Directed by: Ryan Coogler
- Screenplay by: Ryan Coogler; Joe Robert Cole
- Story by: Ryan Coogler
- Based on: Marvel Comics
- Produced by: Kevin Feige; Nate Moore
- Starring: Letitia Wright; Lupita Nyong'o; Danai Gurira; Winston Duke; Florence Kasumba; Dominique Thorne; Michaela Coel; Mabel Cadena; Tenoch Huerta Mejía; Martin Freeman; Julia Louis-Dreyfus; Angela Bassett
- Cinematography: Autumn Durald Arkapaw
- Edited by: Michael P. Shawver; Kelley Dixon; Jennifer Lame
- Music by: Ludwig Göransson
- Production company: Marvel Studios
- Distributed by: Walt Disney Studios Motion Pictures
- Release dates: October 26, 2022 (Hollywood, Los Angeles); November 11, 2022 (United States)
- Running time: 161 minutes
- Country: United States
- Language: English
- Budget: $200–250 million
- Box office: $859.2 million

Black Panther: Wakanda Forever is a 2022 American superhero film based on Marvel Comics featuring the character Shuri / Black Panther. Produced by Marvel Studios and distributed by Walt Disney Studios Motion Pictures, it is the sequel to Black Panther (2018) and the 30th film in the Marvel Cinematic Universe (MCU). Directed by Ryan Coogler, who co-wrote the screenplay with Joe Robert Cole, the film stars Letitia Wright as Shuri / Black Panther, alongside Lupita Nyong'o, Danai Gurira, Winston Duke, Florence Kasumba, Dominique Thorne, Michaela Coel, Mabel Cadena, Tenoch Huerta Mejía, Martin Freeman, Julia Louis-Dreyfus, and Angela Bassett. In the film, the leaders of Wakanda fight to protect their nation in the wake of King T'Challa's death.

Ideas for a sequel began after the release of Black Panther in February 2018. Coogler negotiated to return as director in the following months, and Marvel Studios officially confirmed the sequel's development in mid-2019. Plans for the film changed in August 2020 when Black Panther star and T'Challa actor Chadwick Boseman died from colon cancer, with Marvel choosing not to recast his role. The return of other main cast members from the first film was confirmed that November, and the sequel's title was revealed to be Black Panther: Wakanda Forever in May 2021. Filming began in late June in Atlanta, taking place at both Trilith Studios and Tyler Perry Studios, before moving to Massachusetts in August, but was halted in November to allow Wright to recover from an injury sustained during filming. It resumed by mid-January 2022 and wrapped in late March in Puerto Rico.

Black Panther: Wakanda Forever premiered at the El Capitan Theatre and the Dolby Theatre in Hollywood, Los Angeles, on October 26, 2022, and was released in the United States on November 11, as the final film in Phase Four of the MCU. The film received generally positive reviews from critics and grossed $859.2 million worldwide, becoming the sixth-highest-grossing film of 2022. Wakanda Forever and Bassett's performance received numerous awards and nominations, including five Academy Awards (winning Costume Design), one British Academy Film Award, six Critics' Choice Movie Awards (winning two), two Golden Globe Awards (winning one), and two Screen Actors Guild Awards. A spin-off miniseries focusing on Thorne's Riri Williams, Ironheart, premiered in June 2025. A sequel is scheduled for release in December 2028.

== Plot ==
T'Challa, king of Wakanda, is suffering from a terminal illness which his sister Shuri believes can be cured by the "heart-shaped herb". Shuri attempts to synthetically recreate the herb after it was burned by Erik "Killmonger" Stevens, (Note: As depicted in Black Panther (2018)) but fails to do so before T'Challa dies.

A year later, Wakanda faces pressure from other nations to share their vibranium, with attempts to steal it by force. Queen Ramonda urges Shuri to continue her herb research to create a new Black Panther, but Shuri refuses, believing the Black Panther is no longer needed. In the Atlantic, a U.S. expedition team uses a vibranium detector to find a deposit underwater, but a group of blue-skinned, water-breathing superhumans led by Namor kills them. The CIA suspects Wakanda's involvement. Namor confronts Ramonda and Shuri after bypassing Wakanda's security. He blames Wakanda for the vibranium race and gives them an ultimatum: hand over the scientist who created the detector or he will attack Wakanda.

Shuri and Okoye learn from CIA agent Everett K. Ross that the scientist is MIT student Riri Williams. They confront her at the university before being pursued by the FBI and Namor's warriors, who defeat Okoye and take Shuri and Williams underwater to meet Namor. Angered by Okoye's failure to protect Shuri, Ramonda strips her of her title as general of the Dora Milaje and seeks out Nakia, who has been living in Haiti since the Blip. (Note: As depicted in Avengers: Infinity War (2018)) Namor shows Shuri his vibranium-rich underwater kingdom of Talokan, protected for centuries from the surface world. Bitter at the surface world for the slavery and genocide of his people, Namor proposes an alliance with Wakanda against the rest of the world, threatening destruction if they refuse. Nakia helps Shuri and Williams escape, killing two Talokanil guards. Namor retaliates with an attack on Wakanda, during which Ramonda drowns while saving Williams. Namor vows to return with his army, and Wakanda's citizens relocate to the Jabari mountains for their safety. Meanwhile, Ross is arrested by his ex-wife, CIA director Valentina Allegra de Fontaine, for secretly exchanging classified intelligence with Wakandans.

After Ramonda's funeral, Shuri uses a remnant of the herb that gave Namor's people their superhuman abilities to reconstruct the heart-shaped herb. She ingests it, gaining superhuman abilities and meeting Killmonger in the Ancestral Plane, who questions if she will seek revenge or be as honorable as T'Challa. Shuri dons a new Black Panther suit and is accepted by the other Wakandan tribes as the Black Panther. Despite M'Baku's urges for peace, Shuri is determined to exact vengeance on Namor for Ramonda's death and orders an immediate counterattack on Talokan. Preparing for battle, with Ayo assuming the position of general of the Dora Milaje, Shuri bestows the Midnight Angel armor upon Okoye, who in turn recruits Dora Milaje member Aneka to join her. Williams creates an Iron Man-esque powered exoskeleton to aid the Wakandans.

The Wakandans use a seafaring vessel to lure Namor and his warriors to the surface with a vibranium detector as battle ensues. Shuri traps Namor in a fighter aircraft, aiming to weaken him. They crash on a desert beach and fight. Shuri gains the upper hand but sees a vision of Ramonda, urging Namor to yield and offering a peaceful alliance. Namor agrees, ending the battle. Shuri plants more heart-shaped herbs to ensure the Black Panther mantle's future. In her absence, M'Baku challenges for the throne. Namor's cousin, Namora, is upset by the surrender, but Namor believes the alliance will strengthen Talokan. Williams returns to MIT, leaving her suit behind, while Okoye rescues Ross. Shuri visits Nakia in Haiti and burns her funeral robe to finally grieve for T'Challa, honoring Ramonda's wishes.

In a mid-credits scene, Shuri learns that Nakia and T'Challa had a son named Toussaint, whom Nakia has been raising in secret. Toussaint reveals his Wakandan name is T'Challa.

== Cast ==
- Letitia Wright as Shuri / Black Panther:
  The princess of Wakanda who designs new technology for the nation. Wright was given a larger role in the film following the death of Chadwick Boseman, who starred in previous MCU media as Shuri's older brother T'Challa / Black Panther. Wright said Shuri turns to her technology as a way to grieve T'Challa.
- Lupita Nyong'o as Nakia:
  A former War Dog, an undercover spy for Wakanda, from the River Tribe. Nyong'o said Nakia has "matured" following both the Blip and the death of T'Challa, explaining that her character's "priorities have shifted and sharpened" while adding that Nakia remains "the one you want to call when you're in trouble".
- Danai Gurira as Okoye:
  The general of the Dora Milaje, Wakanda's all-female special forces, and a former Avenger. In the film, Okoye takes on the mantle of one of the Midnight Angels, along with Aneka. Gurira said the film would explore "many facets" of Okoye's humanity.
- Winston Duke as M'Baku:
  A powerful warrior and leader of Wakanda's mountain tribe, the Jabari. Duke indicated that following the Jabari's involvement in the events of the films Avengers: Infinity War (2018) and Avengers: Endgame (2019), the tribe is no longer isolated from the rest of Wakanda. He also felt M'Baku was trying to figure "out how to move forward" in this new world for Wakanda, much like many in the real world were trying to do during the COVID-19 pandemic.
- Florence Kasumba as Ayo:
  The second-in-command of the Dora Milaje who later becomes general after Okoye is stripped of her duties. She is romantically involved with Aneka.
- Dominique Thorne as Riri Williams:
  An MIT student and genius inventor from Chicago who creates a suit of armor that rivals the one built by Tony Stark / Iron Man. Director Ryan Coogler noted that Williams is a foil to Shuri, adding "there's a thread of similarity" between the two, but they are "also very, very different", with Williams and Shuri's relationship representing a similar exploration of the "diversity of the Black experience" as T'Challa and Killmonger's relationship did in the film Black Panther (2018).
- Michaela Coel as Aneka:
  A Wakandan warrior and member of the Dora Milaje who is romantically involved with Ayo. In the film, Aneka takes on the mantle of one of the Midnight Angels, along with Okoye. Coel was drawn to the character being queer as in the comics, and Coogler described Aneka as "kind of a rebel".
- Mabel Cadena as Namora: Namor's cousin and right-hand woman.
- Tenoch Huerta Mejía as Namor:
  The king of Talokan, an ancient civilization of blue-skinned, underwater-dwelling people, who refer to him as the feathered serpent god K'uk'ulkan. Mejía said Namor decides to get involved in the surface world after T'Challa publicly reveals the truth of Wakanda at the end of the first film, which consequently puts Talokan in "jeopardy", leading Namor and his people to "take action to protect themselves". Mejía also confirmed that the character is a mutant as in the comics. Coogler said Namor "[has] lived a really long time and knows no equal in terms of his capabilities", stating that the character, if near enough water, is capable of being as strong as both Thor and Hulk. Mejía called Namor an anti-hero, explaining that it was important to both him and Coogler to humanize the character by making his motivations understandable despite him having an antagonistic role in the film. Coogler said that the DC Comics character Aquaman served as an "indirect guidance" for Namor's portrayal in Wakanda Forever, explaining that because both characters share several similar characteristics that lead to frequent comparisons, he decided not to focus on Namor's similarities to Aquaman, but rather to highlight Namor's "really unique features" from the comics that Coogler was enthused to include in the film, such as the ankle wings and pointy ears, as a way to dissociate Namor's image from that of Aquaman. Coogler also described the character as "kind of an asshole, kind of romantic, and just incredibly powerful". The film changes the meaning of Namor's name from "Avenging Son" in Atlantean, as in the comics, to "niño sin amor" (Spanish for "child without love"), the latter of which is intended to reflect Namor's hatred of the surface world. In the script for Wakanda Forever, Namor's birth name is stated to be Ch'ah Toh Almehen, although this name is not mentioned in the film. To prepare for the role, Mejía underwent a vigorous workout routine to get in shape, as he was concerned about how he would look while wearing Namor's outfit, which in the comics consists exclusively of green swim briefs that Mejía referred to as the "shame shorts". He also learned the Yucatec Maya language and how to swim. Manuel Chavez portrays a young Namor.
- Martin Freeman as Everett K. Ross: An agent of the Central Intelligence Agency (CIA) who has previous ties to Wakanda.
- Julia Louis-Dreyfus as Valentina Allegra de Fontaine: The new director of the CIA and the ex-wife of Ross.
- Angela Bassett as Ramonda:
  The queen regnant of Wakanda who is grieving the death of her son T'Challa. Bassett explained that Ramonda would be trying to balance leading her people, being a mother to Shuri, and keeping threats to Wakanda "at bay", all while grieving the death of T'Challa, which is "a lot for her to handle". While Bassett was initially unhappy with Ramonda being killed off in the film, Coogler reassured her that death is not necessarily permanent in the Marvel Cinematic Universe (MCU), and she felt that her character could return in the future, similar to how people were brought back to life following the Blip in Endgame.

Additionally, Michael B. Jordan reprises his MCU role as N'Jadaka / Erik "Killmonger" Stevens, T'Challa and Shuri's cousin. Returning from Black Panther are Isaach de Bankolé, Danny Sapani, and Dorothy Steel (in her final, posthumous role) as the Wakandan River Tribe, Border Tribe, and Merchant Tribe elders, respectively; Connie Chiume reprises her role as Zawavari, previously the Mining Tribe Elder, but now the Elder Statesman, taking over the role held by Zuri in the first film; and comedian Trevor Noah also reprises his voice role as Shuri's A.I. Griot. Alex Livinalli portrays the Talokanil warrior Attuma, while María Mercedes Coroy portrays Namor's mother. Lake Bell—who previously voiced alternate universe variants of Natasha Romanoff / Black Widow in the Disney+ animated series What If...? (2021–2024)—and Robert John Burke appear as Dr. Graham and Smitty, respectively, a pair of CIA officials in charge of the vibranium mining operation. Richard Schiff appears as the U.S. Secretary of State, while Kamaru Usman appears as a naval officer. Archival footage from previous MCU films of Boseman as T'Challa / Black Panther is used in the film's ending, with Divine Love Konadu-Sun appearing as T'Challa II / Toussaint, T'Challa and Nakia's son. CNN news anchor Anderson Cooper appears as himself reporting on the Wakandan activities. María Telón appears as an elder Mayan woman.

== Production ==
=== Development ===
With the release of Black Panther in February 2018, producer Kevin Feige said there were "many, many stories" to tell about the character and he wanted director and co-writer Ryan Coogler to return for any sequel; Marvel Studios wanted to keep the creative team as intact as possible, while Walt Disney Studios chairman Alan F. Horn, despite feeling it was too early to discuss a sequel, was also positive about the desire to have Coogler return as director. Coogler wanted to see how Chadwick Boseman's T'Challa / Black Panther would grow as a king in future Black Panther films, since his reign had only recently begun in the Marvel Cinematic Universe (MCU) in contrast to the comics, where he was king since childhood. In March 2018, Feige said there was nothing specific to reveal about a sequel, but Marvel had ideas and a "pretty solid direction" on where they wanted to take a second film. That month, Boseman's agent Michael Greene was in negotiations for the actor to return as T'Challa in two planned Black Panther sequels for a reported pay of $10 million and $20 million, respectively. By October, Coogler had closed a deal to write and direct a sequel to Black Panther. Despite both Marvel and Coogler having always intended to work together again after the first film's success, Coogler avoided rushing into a deal. Negotiations with Coogler were completed "under the radar" in the months following the first film's release. He was expected to begin writing the sequel in 2019, ahead of a planned filming start in late 2019 or early 2020.

In November 2018, Letitia Wright was confirmed to be reprising her role of T'Challa's sister Shuri for the sequel. When Angela Bassett, who played Ramonda in Black Panther, was asked if the main cast would return for the sequel, her husband Courtney B. Vance said they would. He said this included Michael B. Jordan as N'Jadaka / Erik "Killmonger" Stevens, who was killed in the first film, and Bassett agreed. Feige dismissed Vance's statement in June 2019 as "pure rumor", saying there were no set plans for the film as Coogler had just begun outlining it and had not yet shared his plans with Feige or co-producer Nate Moore. The next month, John Kani expressed interest in reprising his role as T'Challa's father T'Chaka in the film, and Danai Gurira stated that Coogler had confirmed she would be reprising her role of Okoye in the sequel. Feige confirmed the sequel's development at the 2019 San Diego Comic-Con, while Martin Freeman confirmed in August that he would reprise his role as Everett K. Ross in the sequel. A release date of May 6, 2022, was announced at D23 along with the placeholder title Black Panther II. Feige said Coogler had completed a script treatment for the film that included a villain and new title. At the end of 2019, Ruth E. Carter confirmed that she would be returning from the first film as the costume designer for the sequel, and said that she was set to begin work on it in "the fall". Feige, Boseman, and Coogler discussed adapting elements of Boseman's more "Gung ho" performance as an alternate universe variant of T'Challa in the episode "What If... T'Challa Became a Star-Lord?" from the first season of the Disney+ animated series What If...? (2021–2024) for the film.

Chadwick Boseman was an immensely talented actor and an inspirational individual who affected all of our lives professionally and personally. His portrayal of T'Challa the Black Panther is iconic and transcends any iteration of the character in any other medium from Marvel's past. And it's for that reason that we will not recast the character.

— Producer Kevin Feige in December 2020 on the decision to not recast Boseman's role of T'Challa following his death

On August 28, 2020, Boseman died from colon cancer. Coogler stated that he had been unaware of Boseman's illness, and had spent the last year "preparing, imagining and writing words for him to say [in the film] that we weren't destined to see". Feige and other executives at Marvel Studios were also unaware of Boseman's illness. Boseman, who had become thinner from his illness in the weeks prior to his death, had been prepared to begin gaining the weight back in September 2020 ahead of filming the sequel in March 2021. According to The Hollywood Reporter, industry observers felt Disney could recast the role, but that might generate a "fan outcry" and prompt comparisons between actors. Another suggestion was for Disney to shift their plans and have Shuri take on the mantle of the Black Panther, which occurred in the comic books. By the time of Boseman's death, Coogler was in the middle of writing the script and had already turned in a draft. In mid-November, executive producer Victoria Alonso said a digital double of Boseman would not be created for the film, and added that Marvel was taking their time to work out what they were going to do next and how. Later in the month, Lupita Nyong'o, Winston Duke, and Bassett were confirmed to be reprising their roles for the sequel as Nakia, M'Baku, and Ramonda, respectively, while Tenoch Huerta Mejía was in talks for an antagonist role. At that time, filming was expected to begin in June or July 2021 in Atlanta, Georgia.

In December 2020, the film's release date was moved back to July 8, 2022. Feige also confirmed that the role of T'Challa would not be recast, and said the sequel would explore the world and characters of the first film as a way to honor the legacy that Boseman helped build. He would later reaffirm that visual effects would not be used to include Boseman in the film, and also said it "felt like it was much too soon to recast" noting how the world outside and within the MCU was still processing the loss of Boseman. By the end of the month, Boseman's makeup designer Siân Richards was set to return for the sequel, while his personal costumer Craig Anthony said he would not commit to the film due to Boseman's death. Hair designer Deidra Dixon was unsure if she would return following Boseman's death, as well as the death of her sister. Feige said in January 2021 that the primary focus of the sequel was always about further exploring the characters and "different subcultures" of Wakanda. That same month, Jordan said he was willing to reprise his role as Killmonger as he felt returning to the MCU would "always be on the table in some capacity" due to his love for the character and for working with Coogler. In February, Daniel Kaluuya said he was unsure if he would reprise his role of W'Kabi; he ultimately did not due to scheduling conflicts with Jordan Peele's Universal Pictures film Nope (2022). The sequel, however, establishes that W'Kabi was banished from Wakanda following the events of Black Panther.

=== Pre-production ===
In March 2021, Coogler said he was still writing the script, and described working on the film without Boseman as the hardest thing he had ever done in his career. He added that Boseman had held together the first film, and now as the director, he was the one trying to keep it going. He was able to reuse many elements of his planned film before Boseman's death while incorporating and applying "the themes that the people who were hurting just as much as me could actually perform and execute and come out on the other side whole". According to Coogler, the original version of the script would have explored T'Challa dealing with resuming life after the Blip "grieving the loss of time... after being gone for five years", and involved T'Challa's relationship with his and Nakia's son T'Challa II / Toussaint, who he never met because of the Blip. The film was to be centered around the "Ritual of Eight", in which Toussaint goes to the bush with T'Challa for eight days, and while he must do everything asked of him by T'Challa, he could also ask his father any question which must be answered. During this time, Namor would have attacked, with T'Challa bringing Toussaint along for the entire encounter to ensure the ritual was not broken. Coogler also said that Namor and Valentina Allegra de Fontaine were in the original script, with de Fontaine having a larger role compared to the final film. Coogler had envisioned Namor as a potential antagonist for a future Black Panther film while working on the first film, and requested Marvel Studios not allow the character to be used in any MCU projects before the second film. Wright added that Shuri would have become Black Panther alongside T'Challa. Freeman said he would soon meet with Coogler to discuss the project. In April, Coogler wrote an op-ed in which he said the film would still shoot in Georgia despite the state passing its controversial Election Integrity Act of 2021 law. Though Coogler did not support the bill, he felt that boycotting film production in the state would have a negative effect on the people who otherwise would have been employed by the film. He instead planned to raise awareness of how to overturn the bill. Nyong'o expressed excitement for Coogler's plans and how everyone involved was dedicated to continuing Boseman's legacy, later saying that Coogler had reshaped his ideas for the film to respect Boseman, which she felt was "spiritually and emotionally correct" to do. Moore described the film as "how you move forward while dealing with a tragic loss. All of the characters, both old and new, are dealing with how loss can affect your actions in ways that are emotional and surprising".

The film continues exploring feminist themes from the first film, with Nyong'o saying the film would tackle the "beliefs, passions, loves and arguments" of the women characters, creating "a robust drama". She also felt that Wakanda was a "world we are striving to get to". The film introduces Namor to the MCU, while changing his homeworld from the comics, Atlantis, to Talokan, a decision made by Coogler to avoid comparisons with previous adaptations of the legendary Atlantis seen in works such as the films Atlantis: The Lost Empire (2001) and Aquaman (2018). Talokan—named after Tlālōcān, a realm described in several Aztec codices as a paradise ruled by the deity Tlāloc and his consort Chalchiuhtlicue—is a "lavish", hidden, underwater Mesoamerican civilization that was inspired by ancient Maya culture, with the association between Atlantis and Mesoamerica coming from the book Atlantis: The Antediluvian World (1882) by Ignatius L. Donnelly. The creatives worked closely with Mayan historians and experts to portray Talokan in the film. Coogler noted Talokan was similar to Wakanda in that it was also an advanced civilization "hiding in plain sight", with Moore stating the two "often find themselves in conflict because they're not dissimilar. They are these nations that would prefer to be hidden and isolated, with monarchs who are incredibly powerful and have strong points of view about how the world should be". Hannah Beachler returned from the first film as production designer, noting she did a "deep dive" to portray this version of Atlantis in the film; she was visually inspired by the films Jaws (1975) and Close Encounters of the Third Kind (1977), and Jack Kirby's comic imagery. Several cast members, as well as Coogler, learned to swim for the film. The hand gesture that the Talokan people (Talokanil) use to greet each other throughout the film, in which their hands open and fold in a way that resembles the jaws of a sea creature, was suggested by Mejía along with Mabel Cadena and Alex Livinalli as it was not part of the script, and was inspired by similar gestures depicted in the Codex Zouche-Nuttall document.

More than 2,000 outfits were designed by Carter for the film. The process of creating Namor's costume began about a year before production on the film had started, with Coogler asking several artists to help design the character's outfit; most of them initially submitted drawings that were reminiscent of the costume that debuted in the Marvel Comics series Sub-Mariner vol. 1 #67 (1973) by writer Steve Gerber and artist John Romita Sr., but their ideas were rejected in favor of a design by then-Marvel Studios visual development artist Anthony Francisco, who was inspired by the character's original green swim briefs-clad look. Carter worked closely with Marvel's visual development team and art department to design Shuri's Black Panther costume, sketching out ideas based on the character's appearances in the comics. Carter adorned Shuri's costume with a combination of gold and silver elements that she felt would highlight the character's femininity, wanting the costume's design to stay close to Shuri's "form, the silhouette of a woman, with a bust and hips and shoulders" while also trying to "delicately enhance the dynamic figure of the Panther suit". Costume company Film Illusions developed the material Carter used to create the Midnight Angels costumes. Carter said Ramonda's outfit has a "strong presence of metal", featuring a collar that was 3D printed and painted to look like metal. For the Talokanil costumes, Carter sought advice from Mesoamerican historians and experts, as well as oceanographers and marine biologists. She incorporated jade and aquatic elements, and referenced sea creatures in their headdresses, such as Namora's, which resembles the fins of a lionfish, and Attuma's, which resembles the skull of a hammerhead shark. Many of the costumes needed to be tested in water given the amount of underwater filming that occurred, with Carter stating, "Clothes aren't meant to be worn underwater for eight hours and used again the next day. We had to rethink everything about what fibers could go in water and still look organic. We'd like to think clothes look like ballet all the time in water, but they just rise up".

In May 2021, Marvel Studios revealed the film's title as Black Panther: Wakanda Forever, which Ethan Anderton of /Film believed was a fitting tribute to Boseman since "Wakanda Forever" is the battle cry of the Wakandans. According to Moore, hundreds of different subtitles were considered for the second Black Panther film, such as Kingdom of the Deep in reference to Talokan, with Wakanda Forever originally intended to be used as the subtitle for a potential third Black Panther film before the creative team decided to use it for the second film, which Moore felt was the "right" decision, describing the project as a "story about legacy, it's a story about persistence, and Wakanda Forever says all of those things". By the end of that month, Freeman said he had read the script and expressed excitement for it. At the end of June, Edgar Luna, the business development manager of Worcester, Massachusetts's Economic Development Office, said the technical department of Wakanda Forever was in the city the week of June 25 to scout and inspect filming locations, including at the Worcester Police Department headquarters.

=== Filming ===
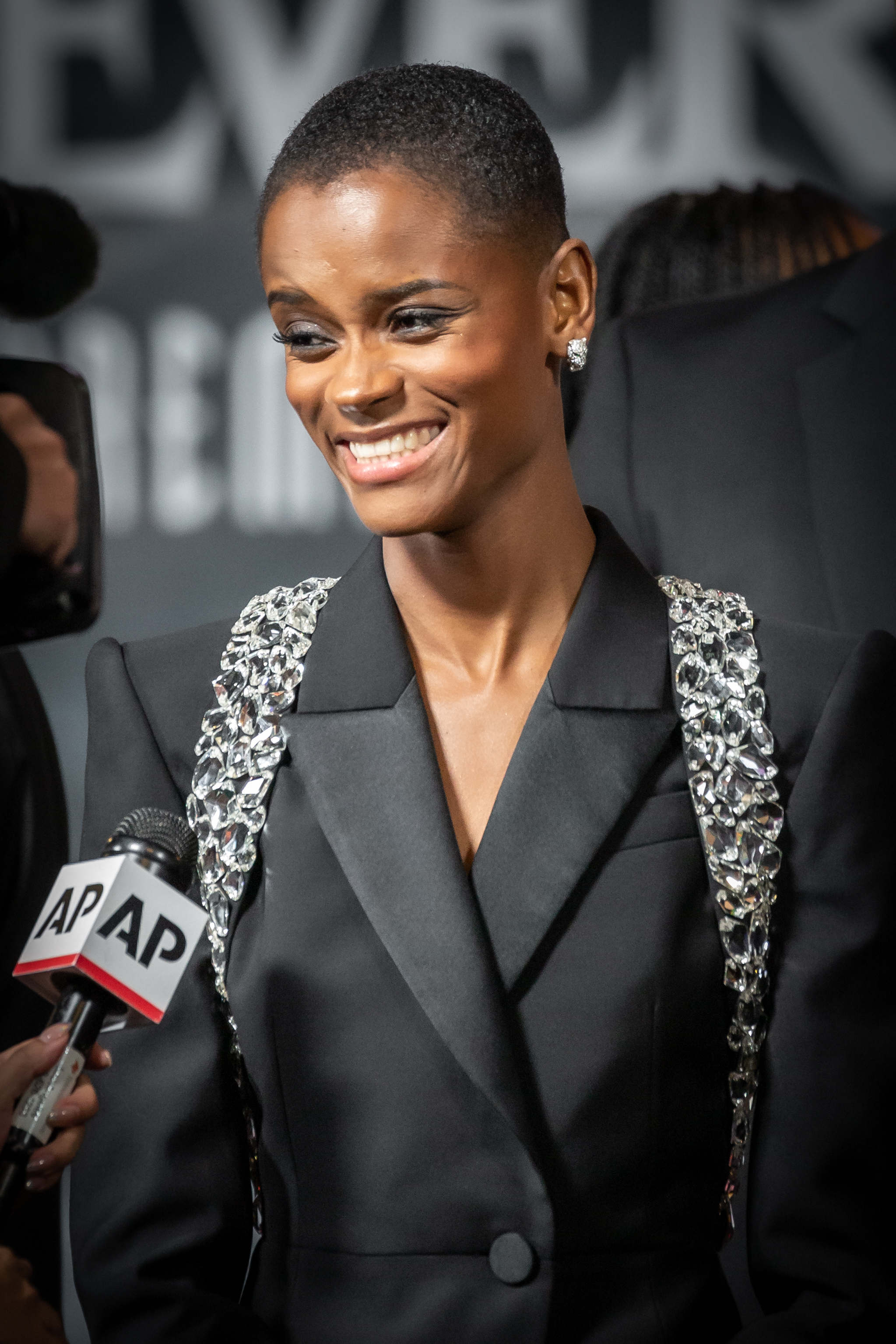
Star Letitia Wright was confirmed as the film's new lead after suffering an on-set injury during filming

Production started at Trilith Studios in Atlanta, Georgia, on June 29, 2021, under the working title Summer Break. Prior to Boseman's death, filming had been set to start in March 2021. At the start of filming, Feige announced that "everyone" from the first film was expected to return. Autumn Durald Arkapaw serves as the cinematographer, after doing so on the Disney+ television series Loki (2021–2023), replacing the first film's cinematographer Rachel Morrison. A long time collaborator of Coogler's, Morrison planned to return for Wakanda Forever but was unable to due to a scheduling conflict with her film The Fire Inside (2024) caused by the COVID-19 pandemic. Discussing the use of anamorphic lenses as opposed to spherical lenses, Coogler explained that anamorphic lenses "warp the image a little bit", which fit with the film having "the fog of loss over it"; a "profound loss... can warp how you look at the world". Arkapaw used Panavision T Series anamorphic lenses which were specifically modified by Panavision. Wright, Gurira, Nyong'o, and Florence Kasumba bonded together on set while dealing with their grief for Boseman's death, with Wright and Gurira particularly connecting through taking walks together. Gurira described feeling emotional while entering the throne set, as she remembered filming scenes with Boseman during the first film and said that Coogler helped her process her grief.

Bassett said in July that the screenplay was still undergoing changes due to Boseman's death, and had gone through at least five incarnations. She also indicated that the first film's co-writer Joe Robert Cole was contributing to the sequel, which Feige soon confirmed. Michaela Coel joined the cast in an undisclosed role. In August, Isaach de Bankolé was set to reprise his role as the Wakandan River Tribe elder, and Dominique Thorne began filming scenes for Wakanda Forever as Riri Williams before starring as that character in the Disney+ miniseries Ironheart (2025). Thorne previously auditioned for the role of Shuri in Black Panther. Filming that month was expected to take place at the Massachusetts Institute of Technology (MIT) and in Worcester, with the production preparing to film a car chase in Worcester by August 18. A chase scene was filmed in the Ernest A. Johnson Tunnel on August 23 and 24. On August 25, Wright was temporarily hospitalized with what were believed to be minor injuries sustained in an accident while filming a stunt in Boston. Wright went to her home in London for recovery in September while filming continued to shoot around her character. Dorothy Steel, who portrayed the Wakandan Merchant Tribe elder in the first film, died on October 15; she was in the middle of reprising her role for the sequel when she died.

In late October, the film's release was delayed to November 11, 2022. The production moved to the Mary Ross Waterfront Park in Brunswick, Georgia by October 22, where filming occurred from October 28 to November 2. Michael Torras, the manager of the Brunswick Landing Marina, said a 300-foot cruise ship would join the production in the following days, and most of the filming occurred on the water. Matthew Hill, Brunswick's downtown development authority director, said most of the scenes were shot at night. By November 5, filming of the scenes that did not require Wright was completed, before the production went on hiatus on November 19. This was to accommodate Wright's fractured shoulder and a concussion, which were more serious than initially determined, and was not expected to affect the film's release date. The United States' Centers for Disease Control and Prevention (CDC) implemented new rules on November 8 requiring non-U.S. citizens to be fully vaccinated against COVID-19 and provide proof of vaccination before traveling to the country. The Hollywood Reporter noted that this could present an issue for Wright's return to filming in Atlanta since she is not a U.S. citizen and was reportedly not vaccinated. In mid-December, The Hollywood Reporter confirmed that filming would resume in late January 2022 in Atlanta with Wright involved; Feige, Moore, and executive producer Louis D'Esposito confirmed upon the start of the hiatus that Wright was the film's new lead.

Filming resumed by mid-January 2022, with a recovered Wright returning, and was expected to continue for four weeks. Filming was originally scheduled to resume on January 10 but was delayed by a week after cast and crew members, including Nyong'o, tested positive for COVID-19. At that time, The Hollywood Reporter reported that Duke had negotiated a pay raise for his return because of his character's expanded role in the sequel. The following month, Nyong'o revealed that Danny Sapani would be reprising his role as the Wakandan Border Tribe elder in the film. Thorne completed filming her scenes by March 13. Additional photography began on March 18, in Puerto Rico, where filming officially wrapped on March 24.

=== Post-production ===
In June 2022, Mejía confirmed that he was appearing in the film, and he was officially announced to be playing Namor at the 2022 San Diego Comic-Con the next month, when Coel, Cadena, and Livinalli were also revealed to be respectively playing Aneka, Namora, and Attuma, and Kasumba was confirmed to be reprising her role as Ayo. Reshoots occurred with the cast following their appearance at Comic-Con. Mejía said the reshoots were intended to add "little missing pieces" to the film. In late July, it was reported that Kamaru Usman had been cast in the film for a role that was subsequently confirmed to be a cameo appearance as a naval officer, while Richard Schiff was revealed to be cast in September, playing the U.S. Secretary of State in the film. Lake Bell, who previously voiced alternate universe variants of Natasha Romanoff / Black Widow in What If...?, was revealed to be appearing in the film in late October. In early November, María Mercedes Coroy confirmed that she had been cast as Namor's mother Fen in the film. By the middle of the month, Jordan and Julia Louis-Dreyfus were revealed to be reprising their MCU roles as Killmonger and Valentina Allegra de Fontaine in the film. Additionally, Robert John Burke was revealed to have been cast in the film; both he and Bell were confirmed to be playing a pair of Central Intelligence Agency (CIA) officials named Smitty and Graham, respectively. In September 2024, WWE wrestler Damian Priest stated that he was offered a role in the film, reportedly as either Namor or Attuma, but declared that the offer was seemingly taken away from him by Vince McMahon's regime despite his availability.

Archival footage of Boseman as T'Challa / Black Panther from previous MCU films is used at the end of Wakanda Forever. Unlike most MCU films that include both mid-credits and post-credits scenes, Wakanda Forever features only one scene: it shows Shuri being introduced to her nephew T'Challa II / Toussaint, who was played by Divine Love Konadu-Sun. Moore said the creative team did not consider including an additional scene after the credits in the film at any point during its production, as they "felt the ending was so kind of poetic" that they thought it would be "a little disingenuous tonally" to do so, with Moore calling the film "an emotional experience" that—similar to the MCU film Avengers: Endgame (2019)—"didn't need a stinger at the end". Wright said only two other children auditioned for the role of T'Challa II besides Konadu-Sun. Having felt inspired to become an actor by Black Panther, Konadu-Sun read many scripts in order to audition, a process he found challenging due to the character being different to his own personality, and once he landed on the role, he opted to watch the MCU film Captain America: Civil War (2016) to prepare due to that being Boseman's first appearance as T'Challa. Several characters were considered to take on the mantle of Black Panther in the film, including Nakia and M'Baku, before Shuri was chosen. Aaron Toney, who served as fight coordinator on Wakanda Forever, confirmed that Namor's ankle wings are capable of growing back after a scene in the film showed one of them being cut off by Shuri. There had been discussions regarding the inclusion of a romance between Shuri and Namor in the film, but the idea was scrapped.

External videos
- Marvel Studios' Black Panther: Wakanda Forever End Credits Main on End Title Sequence presents the film's main-on-end title sequence, YouTube video from Perception's channel

Michael P. Shawver returned as editor from the first film, while Geoffrey Baumann served as the visual effects supervisor. The visual effects for Wakanda Forever were provided by Digital Domain, Industrial Light & Magic, Wētā FX, Cinesite, Rise FX, SSVFX, and Storm Studios. 2,233 out of the film's 2,548 shots involved the use of visual effects, which were created by more than a dozen VFX vendors. Perception designed the film's main-on-end title sequence, which depicts Shuri's funeral clothes being burned to reveal a Black Panther suit underneath. The sequence was filmed practically using a specialized fireproof Panavision camera, with Perception igniting controlled flames on cloth similar to the fabric worn by Shuri in the film. Sound editors Steve Boeddeker and Benny Burtt, who both worked on the film, used the sound of rattlesnakes for Namor's ankle wings, an idea Coogler suggested about two weeks before sound editing was completed. In late November 2022, Wētā FX supervisor Chris White revealed that Marvel Studios created a 200-page Talokan bible for the film that contains details about the kingdom such as its history, battle strategies, tools built, architecture, influence, and other elements. The next month, Shawver revealed that the film originally had a four-and-a-half-hour cut that included additional scenes featuring Talokan and the developing relationship between Shuri and Williams, as well as a subplot involving the two of them teaming up with Namor to accomplish an unspecified task. Shawver attributed the reduced cut of the film to changes in its "pacing", and added that the removal of that material caused the film's narrative to be reworked, which was done during reshoots.

== Music ==
In September 2021, it was revealed that Ludwig Göransson was set to return as composer for Wakanda Forever from the first film. His score was released by Hollywood Records on November 11, 2022.

Black Panther: Wakanda Forever Prologue, a soundtrack extended play, was released by Hollywood Records and Marvel Music on July 25, 2022, and includes Tems' cover of Bob Marley's "No Woman, No Cry", which was used in the film's teaser trailer, "A Body, A Coffin" by Amaarae, and "Soy" by Santa Fe Klan. Göransson produced all three songs, and co-wrote "A Body, A Coffin" with Amaarae, Kyu Steed, KZ, Cracker Mallo, and Maesu. In late October 2022, it was announced that the film's lead single would be "Lift Me Up" by Rihanna, written by Tems, Göransson, Rihanna, and Coogler, as a tribute to Boseman. The single marks Rihanna's first solo musical output since 2016 and was released on October 28, through Westbury Road, Roc Nation, Def Jam Recordings, and Hollywood Records. Tems stated she wanted to write a song that "portrays a warm embrace from all the people that I've lost in my life". "Lift Me Up" was featured on the film's soundtrack, Black Panther: Wakanda Forever – Music from and Inspired By, which was released on November 4, 2022, by Roc Nation, Def Jam Recordings, and Hollywood Records.

Voices Rising: The Music of Wakanda Forever, a three-part documentary series detailing the creation process of Wakanda Forever's soundtrack, had its first episode released on Disney+ on February 28, 2023. In the first episode, "Nigeria: Past Is Present", Coogler and Göransson work in Lagos, Nigeria to incorporate the sounds of traditional music along with contemporary artists such as Fireboy DML, Bloody Civilian, and Busiswa into the score. The second episode, "Mexico: Con La Brisa", sees Göransson working in Mexico to once again blend traditional music and instruments alongside modern artists such as Foudeqush, Vivir Quintana, and Mare Advertencia, to create the sound of Namor and the Talokan people. The third episode, "London: Bring It Home", sees Göransson recording the orchestra for the score at the Abbey Road Studios in London in mid-2022, while working to infuse it with the elements he recorded in Mexico and Nigeria alongside artists including Jorja Smith and Burna Boy. Göransson also collaborates again with Senegalese singer Baba Maal, who returned from the first film to provide vocals. The series was produced by Actual Films, JM Films, and Proximity Media. The series was originally scheduled to be removed from Disney+ on May 26, 2023, as part of Disney's efforts to reduce content costs, but it was ultimately decided that it would remain on the service at that time.

== Marketing ==
The first footage from the film was shown in a sizzle reel of Disney's upcoming films during the studio's presentation at CinemaCon in April 2022. Feige, Coogler, and the cast promoted the film at the 2022 San Diego Comic-Con alongside a live performance from singer Baaba Maal, tama player Massamba Diop, and other African drummers and dancers and the debut of the teaser trailer on July 23, 2022. It featured a cover of Bob Marley's "No Woman, No Cry" that transitions into Kendrick Lamar's "Alright" (2015). Both Leah Simpson and Giovana Gelhoren of People called the footage "powerful", while Sandra Gonzalez of CNN felt the teaser commemorated Boseman's performance and wrote "amid the grief that permeates the preview, there's hope, the birth of new life (literally) and a glimpse at the future, with a clawed sneak peek of a new suited hero". Writing for IndieWire, Christian Zilko also felt the teaser commemorated Boseman's performance while also opining that this presented a "daunting" challenge for Marvel Studios for Black Panther's future, due to Boseman being regarded as "one of the cornerstones of the MCU moving forward" and the studio not recasting his role. Variety's Carson Burton and J. Kim Murphy felt the teaser focused on who would "take on the mantle" of Black Panther, noting the presence of a mysterious figure at the end of the trailer. The teaser trailer received 172 million views in its first 24 hours of release. Funko Pops for the film were also revealed a day after.

The film was included in a sizzle reel shown ahead of screenings during National Cinema Day that highlighted upcoming films from various studios. Coogler, Wright, Duke, Bassett, and Mejía promoted the film at the 2022 D23 Expo with exclusive footage, which Aaron Couch from The Hollywood Reporter described as a "gripping sequence". An official trailer was released on October 3, 2022. EJ Panaligan at Variety and Narayan Liu of Comic Book Resources both called it an "exciting" trailer that provided a better look at the new Black Panther costume, with Liu adding it teased "a more intense storyline centered on loss, strength and the heroes" of the MCU. Devan Coggan of Entertainment Weekly said the trailer was "the best look yet at Wakanda's future" which ended with "a stunning look at the new Panther suit". Gizmodo's Linda Codega found everything in the trailer from "the music, the energy, [and] the intensity" to be "incredible" and exclaimed the film appeared to be "balanc[ing] political maneuvering, spycraft, and the kind of goofiness [one would] expect out of a Marvel film".

In October 2022, Marvel partnered with Target for an ad campaign featuring Thorne reprising her role as Riri Williams. The minute-long ad was directed by Malik Vitthal and shows Williams working on her Mark I Ironheart suit concurrently with a group of young Black girls creating with Lego. Williams sees one of the girls at Target, who gives her inspiration for her suit's power source. Shannon Miller at Adweek called the ad "a rare occurrence in mainstream marketing" of two young Black STEM girls interacting. The ad featured several MCU-themed Easter eggs and the song "I Got the Juice" by Janelle Monáe featuring Pharrell Williams. It debuted online on October 16, 2022, with an airing during Monday Night Football the following day; 30 and 15-second versions were also created. Marvel and Target's partnership also includes exclusive merchandise and augmented reality experiences within Target stores. Also in October, Sprite Zero Sugar launched a marketing campaign to promote the film from Wieden + Kennedy and Momentum Worldwide. Lexus ran an advertisement promoting its RZ 450e with Gurira portraying Okoye. Lexus and Adidas teamed up to design a custom Lexus LC 500 Convertible for JuJu Smith-Schuster during the world premiere. Both it and the Lexus GX feature in the film.

On November 1, McDonald's began selling Wakanda Forever Happy Meals which included one of ten toys based on characters from the film. Additionally, Kraft Foods released macaroni and cheese with Wakanda Forever-inspired shapes. A six-episode podcast hosted by Ta-Nehisi Coates, titled Wakanda Forever: The Official Black Panther Podcast, features interviews with the cast and crew discussing the making of the film. The first episode premiered on November 3, 2022, and the subsequent episodes would be released weekly beginning January 2023. Three episodes of the series Marvel Studios: Legends were released on November 4, 2022, exploring T'Challa, Shuri, and the Dora Milaje using footage from their previous MCU appearances, while a 20/20 TV special entitled Black Panther: In Search of Wakanda hosted by Robin Roberts and featuring interviews with the film's cast was aired on ABC. To celebrate the launch of Adidas' "Wakanda Forever Collection", Calty Design Research, Adidas School for Experiential Education in Design and Carbon partnered to design a custom Lexus RX 500h F SPORT inspired by the film. Advertisers paid more than $100 million for the promotional campaign of Wakanda Forever according to Deadline Hollywood.

== Release ==
=== Theatrical ===
Black Panther: Wakanda Forever premiered at the El Capitan Theatre and the Dolby Theatre in Hollywood, Los Angeles, on October 26, 2022. It also premiered in Lagos, Nigeria on November 6, 2022, an occasion Deadline Hollywood described as the first local premiere for a Marvel film.

It began releasing internationally on November 9, 2022, and in the United States on November 11. It was previously scheduled for May 6 and then for July 8, 2022. The film was released theatrically in France, despite the country's 17-month waiting period for when films can appear on streaming services after its theatrical release. Disney's decision to release Wakanda Forever in theaters was encouraged by the French government's acknowledgment that their media chronology needed to be modernized and their timeline to do so, after previously opting to skip the theatrical release of their film Strange World (2022) and release it directly to Disney+. Under the current chronology, Wakanda Forever would first become available on Disney+ in France in early 2024. The removal of a depiction of a same-sex relationship between Ayo and Aneka, along with some other edits, were made for the film to be released in Kuwait. Wakanda Forever was released in China on February 7, 2023, becoming the first MCU film to be released in the country since Spider-Man: Far From Home (2019). It is the final film of Phase Four of the MCU.

=== Home media ===
The film was released on Disney+ on February 1, 2023, with an IMAX Enhanced version also available. It was also released by Walt Disney Studios Home Entertainment on Ultra HD Blu-ray, Blu-ray, and DVD on February 7, 2023. The home media includes audio commentary, deleted scenes, a gag reel, and various behind-the-scenes featurettes. Upon its release on Disney+, the film became the most-watched Marvel film premiere globally on the service, based on hours streamed in its first five days.

== Reception ==
=== Box office ===
Black Panther: Wakanda Forever has grossed $453.8 million in the United States and Canada, and $405.4 million in other territories, for a worldwide total of $859.2 million. It is the sixth-highest-grossing film of 2022. Its worldwide opening weekend earned $331.6 million, marking the third-largest opening of the pandemic era, behind Spider-Man: No Way Home ($601 million) and Doctor Strange in the Multiverse of Madness ($452 million). Deadline Hollywood calculated the film's net profit as $259 million, accounting for production budgets, marketing, talent participations, and other costs; box office grosses and home media revenues placed it fifth on their list of 2022's "Most Valuable Blockbusters".

According to The Hollywood Reporter, Wakanda Forever was projected to earn $175 million in the US and Canada on its opening weekend. By November 2022, Boxoffice Pro estimated the film's opening weekend in the US and Canada to be between $170–205 million, and projected the film would earn $435–543 million for its total domestic gross. The film made $84.3 million on its first day, which included $28 million from Thursday night previews. Its opening weekend earned $181.3 million, becoming the top film of the weekend. This marked the largest November opening weekend ever, surpassing The Hunger Games: Catching Fire ($158.1 million), and the third-biggest opening for a film during the pandemic era, behind No Way Home ($260 million) and Multiverse of Madness ($187 million). Wakanda Forever remained the top film in its sophomore weekend, grossing over $66.5 million, representing a drop of 63%. The following weekend, the film remained atop the box office, grossing $45.6 million (a decline of 31%). Its gross over the five-day Thanksgiving weekend was $63.8 million. The film remained atop the chart for its fourth and fifth weekend, earning $17.5 million and $11.2 million, respectively. In its sixth weekend, Wakanda Forever earned $5.3 million and was displaced by Avatar: The Way of Water. It is the third-highest-grossing film of 2022 in the region behind Top Gun: Maverick and The Way of Water.

Outside of the US and Canada, the film grossed $150.3 million from 50 markets in its first weekend. It had the biggest opening ever for a film in Nigeria, as well as the second-biggest for a film released in 2022 in France and South Africa. Disney Africa reported that the film set an all-time box office record in West Africa and accumulated the biggest opening of 2022 in East Africa, as well as the second-highest box office gross ever in Southern Africa. The five highest openings for the film were in the United Kingdom and Ireland ($15 million), France ($13.7 million), Mexico ($12.8 million), South Korea ($8.9 million) and Brazil ($7.1 million). In its second weekend, Wakanda Forever grossed $69.8 million, for a drop of 49%, while in its third weekend, it grossed $32.1 million, for a drop of 53%. As of March 12, 2023, the highest grossing territories were the United Kingdom ($41 million), Mexico ($35.9 million), France ($33.2 million), Brazil ($21.4 million), and Australia ($19.5 million).

=== Critical response ===
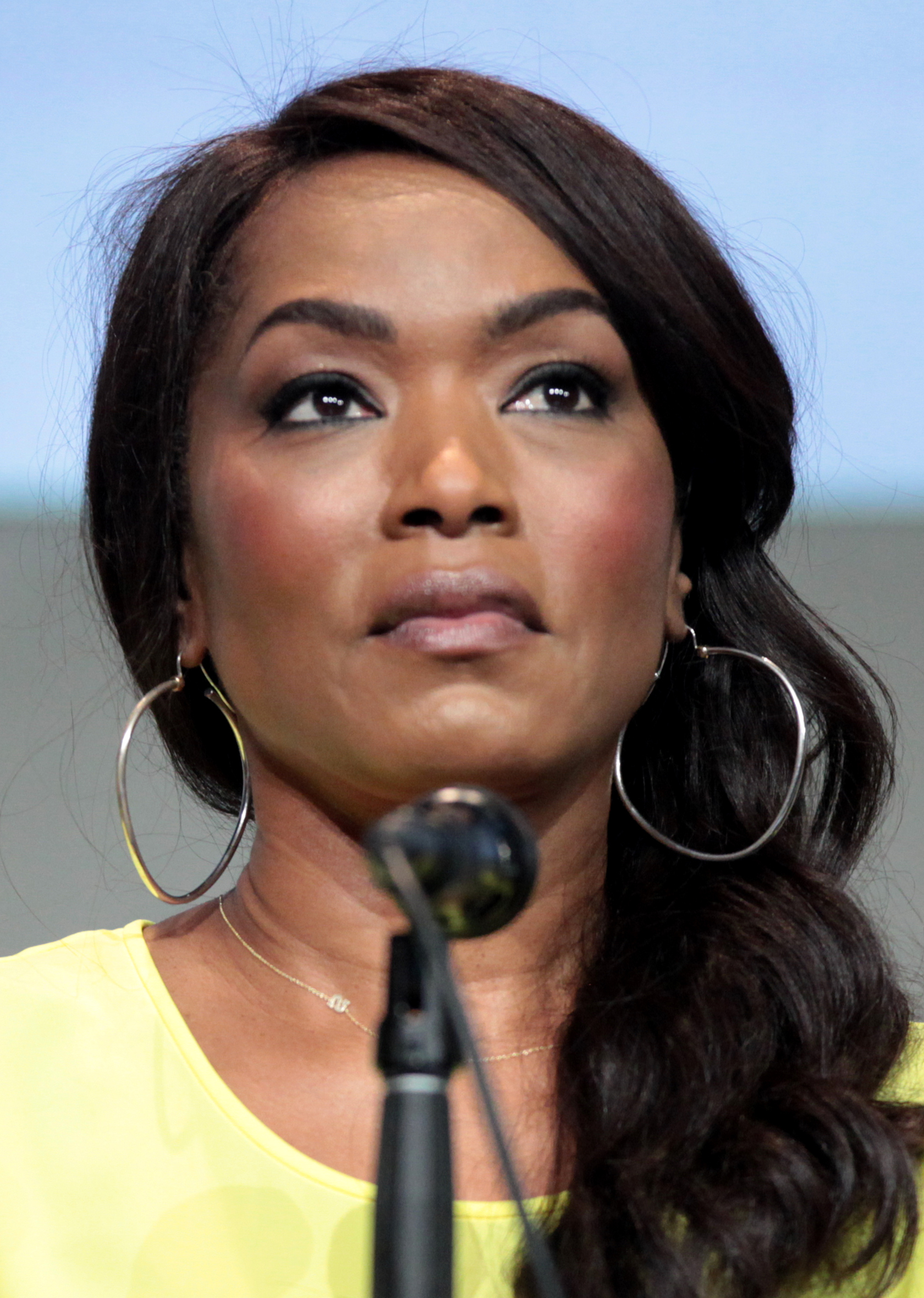
Angela Bassett received widespread acclaim for her performance as Queen Ramonda, and became the first actress to win a major individual acting award for a Marvel film.

The review aggregator website Rotten Tomatoes reported an approval rating of 84% with an average rating of 7.2/10, based on 448 reviews. The site's critics consensus reads: "A poignant tribute that satisfyingly moves the franchise forward, Black Panther: Wakanda Forever marks an ambitious and emotionally rewarding triumph for the MCU". On Metacritic, the film has a weighted average score of 67 out of 100, based on 62 critics, indicating "generally favorable" reviews. Audiences polled by CinemaScore gave the film an average grade of "A" on an A+ to F scale, while PostTrak reported audience members gave the film an overall positive score of 93%, with 85% saying that they would definitely recommend it.

Kambole Campbell at Empire gave the film 4 out of 5 stars, stating that the film "stands out from a somewhat formulaic era of Marvel movies: held together by its compelling sense of place, and by acting as a passionate eulogy for Chadwick Boseman", and feeling that it was "imaginative and... grounded, which makes the tilt to the usual CG-dominated spectacle a little jarring". Campbell lauded the performances of Wright, Duke, Bassett, and Coel, and described Mejía's character as "a highlight, an imaginative adaptation of the veteran comics character, one who here speaks truth with convincing venom". Tom Jorgensen at IGN gave the film 7 out of 10, stating that it was "an effective, emotional farewell to T'Challa—a meditation on forging one's own future out of a painful past—but with a plot that has to introduce an entirely new nation and pave the way for a new wave of Marvel stories, it does struggle under the weight of all that expectation". Jorgensen lauded Bassett and Mejía's performances, but he felt that Talokan had not been "establish[ed]... quite as gracefully" and the film's third act had "push[ed] its luck too far... with a poorly conceived and logically baffling tactical choice".

Owen Gleiberman of Variety wrote: "The movie doesn't have the classic comic-book pow of Black Panther, and it's easily 20 minutes too long (we could probably have lived without the Talokan backstory). Yet Wakanda Forever has a slow-burn emotional suspense. Once the film starts to gather steam, it doesn't let up". Similarly, Michael Phillips of the Chicago Tribune felt Wakanda Forever "is not special like the first movie was. The quality of the storytelling and especially the action sequences grows less effective as the film proceeds". Nevertheless, he singled out that "every actor on screen here is marvelous, even when the script and effects-driven spectacle settles for the wrong kind of 'more'". Peter Travers of ABC News commended the performances from Bassett, Wright and Thorne, but wrote the film's runtime "feels loooong, with dragged out battle scenes, excessive computer effects and way too much franchise building". The BBC's Nicholas Barber said that the sequel struggled due to the loss of Boseman, but commended the visual effects and Bassett, Wright, and Lupita Nyong'o's acting.

David Rooney of The Hollywood Reporter felt that "[e]ven if the length feels overextended, Coogler and his editors deserve credit for allowing breathing space between the action scenes for character and relationship development, with Ludwig Göransson's African-inflected score enhancing both those quieter moments and the big smackdowns. It's impossible for Wakanda Forever to match the breakthrough impact of its predecessor, but in terms of continuing the saga while paving the way for future installments, it's amply satisfying". Ann Hornaday of The Washington Post wrote: "Wakanda Forever winds up feeling hopelessly stalled, covering up an inability to move on by resorting to repetitive, over-familiar action sequences, maudlin emotional beats and an uninvolving, occasionally incoherent story". James Berardinelli of ReelViews gave the film two stars out of four, criticizing the film's runtime and worldbuilding subplots. He further wrote that the sequel is "not so much a bad movie as it is disappointing and frustrating. There are some strong moments both in terms of character development (primarily for Shuri, who has the deepest and most compelling arc) and action (the car chase is perfunctory but some of the battle scenes are well-executed), but not enough of them. There are no rousing moments designed to elicit a mass cheer from the audience".

French Minister of Armed Forces Sébastien Lecornu took issue with the portrayal of the French Armed Forces in the film, calling it a "false and misleading representation". A scene in the film shows French mercenaries who were captured by Wakandans after they attacked an outpost in Mali being brought before the United Nations in uniforms similar to those worn by French soldiers in Operation Barkhane. This was considered a "sensitive" storyline for France, given its soldiers withdrew from its involvement in the Mali War in 2022, and were replaced by Russia's Wagner Group.

=== Accolades ===
Black Panther: Wakanda Forever was nominated for five Academy Awards (winning one), a British Academy Film Award, six Critics' Choice Movie Awards (winning two), two Golden Globe Awards (winning one), and two Screen Actors Guild Awards, among others. Bassett became the first actress to win a major acting award for her role in a Marvel film. In addition, with Bassett's nomination for Best Supporting Actress at the 95th Academy Awards, Wakanda Forever became the first Marvel film to be nominated for an Academy Award in an acting category.

== Documentary special ==
In February 2021, the documentary series Marvel Studios: Assembled was announced. The special on this film, "The Making of Black Panther: Wakanda Forever", was released on Disney+ on February 8, 2023.

== Future ==
=== Ironheart ===
In November 2022, Moore stated that the Disney+ miniseries Ironheart would serve as a direct sequel to Wakanda Forever, with Thorne reprising her role as Riri Williams. The series premiered on June 24, 2025, as part of Phase Five of the MCU.

=== Sequel ===
By November 2022, Coogler had discussed a potential third Black Panther film with Feige. In January 2023, Wright said a third film was being considered, but the cast and Coogler needed "a little bit of a break... to regroup" before starting work on it. In November 2024, Denzel Washington said Coogler was writing a role for him in the third film. The next month, Moore said he would return to produce Black Panther 3 with Marvel Studios after exiting his role with the studio in March 2025. Coogler confirmed Washington's casting in June 2025, and that November he confirmed that Black Panther 3 would be his next film and development had begun. At San Diego Comic-Con in July 2026, Feige and Coogler announced that David Jonsson had been cast as an adult version of T'Challa II / Toussaint, who would take on the mantle of Black Panther in Black Panther III. The film is scheduled for release on December 15, 2028, with Wright and Duke set to reprise their roles.

== See also ==
- List of Afrofuturist films
- List of underwater science fiction works
