= Robert Zimmermann =

Robert Zimmermann may refer to:

- Robert Zimmermann (painter) (1815–1864), landscape painter
- Robert Zimmermann (footballer) (born 1963), former German football player
- Robert Zimmermann (cyclist) (1912–2006), Swiss cyclist
- Robert Zimmermann (bobsleigh) (1934–2012), Swiss bobsledder
- Robert von Zimmermann (1824–1898), Czech-born Austrian philosopher

== See also ==
- Robert Zimmerman (disambiguation)
