= List of accolades received by Black Panther: Wakanda Forever =

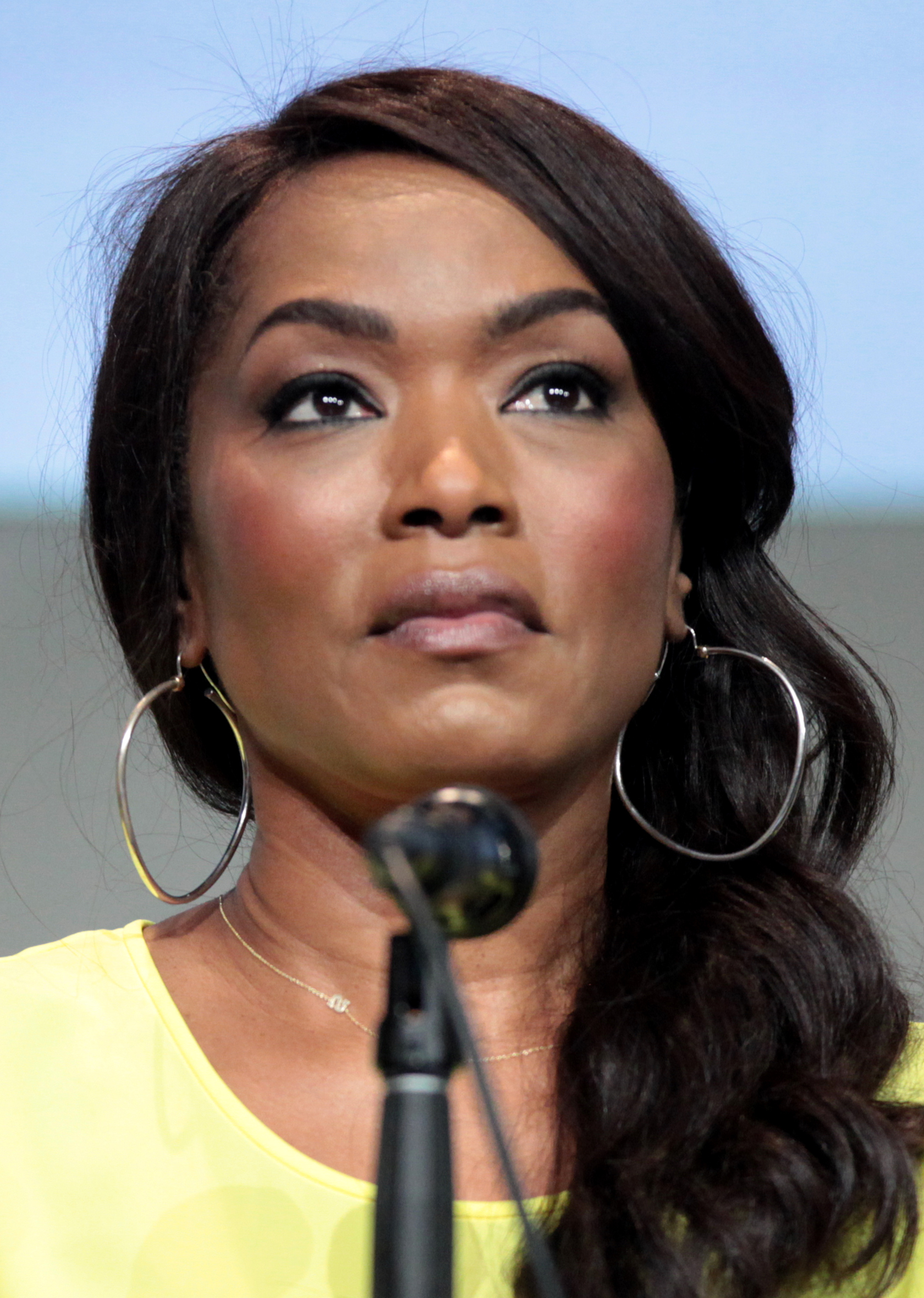
- Angela Bassett received widespread acclaim from critics and audiences with the most acting nominations for Black Panther: Wakanda Forever.
Accolades
Award	Wins	Nominations
AARP Movies for Grownups Awards	0	1
Academy Awards	1	5
African-American Film Critics Association Awards	5	5
Alliance of Women Film Journalists Awards	0	2
Art Directors Guild Awards	0	1
BET Awards	0	3
Billboard Music Awards	0	1
Black Reel Awards	5	14
British Academy Film Awards	0	1
Chicago Film Critics Association Awards	0	1
Costume Designers Guild Awards	0	1
Critics' Choice Movie Awards	2	6
Critics' Choice Super Awards	1	5
Dallas–Fort Worth Film Critics Association	1	1
Georgia Film Critics Association	0	5
Golden Globe Awards	1	2
Grammy Awards	0	3
Guild of Music Supervisors Awards	1	3
Hollywood Critics Association Awards	1	2
Hollywood Critics Association Creative Arts Awards	1	5
Hollywood Music in Media Awards	1	3
Hugo Awards	0	1
Kids' Choice Awards	0	4
London Film Critics' Circle Awards	0	2
Make-Up Artists and Hair Stylists Guild	1	2
MTV Movie & TV Awards	0	3
NAACP Image Awards	10	15
Online Film Critics Society Awards	0	2
Producers Guild of America Awards	0	1
San Diego Film Critics Society	0	1
San Francisco Bay Area Film Critics Circle	0	2
Satellite Awards	0	4
Saturn Awards	0	3
Screen Actors Guild Awards	0	2
Seattle Film Critics Society	0	2
Set Decorators Society of America Awards	0	1
Society of Composers & Lyricists Awards	0	1
St. Louis Gateway Film Critics Association Awards	2	4
Visual Effects Society Awards	0	1
Washington D.C. Area Film Critics Association Awards	1	2
Writers Guild of America Awards	0	1

Totals (Note: Certain award groups do not simply award one winner. They acknowledge several different recipients, have runners-up, and have third place. Since this is a specific recognition and is different from losing an award, runner-up mentions are considered wins in this award tally. For simplification and to avoid errors, each award in this list has been presumed to have had a prior nomination.)
- Wins: 34
- Nominations: 121

Black Panther: Wakanda Forever is a 2022 American superhero film based on the Marvel Comics character Black Panther. Produced by Marvel Studios and distributed by Walt Disney Studios Motion Pictures, it is the sequel to Black Panther (2018) and the 30th film in the Marvel Cinematic Universe (MCU). Directed by Ryan Coogler, who co-wrote the screenplay with Joe Robert Cole, the film stars Letitia Wright as Shuri / Black Panther, alongside Lupita Nyong'o, Danai Gurira, Winston Duke, Florence Kasumba, Dominique Thorne, Michaela Coel, Tenoch Huerta Mejía, Martin Freeman, Julia Louis-Dreyfus, and Angela Bassett. In the film, the leaders of Wakanda fight to protect their nation in the wake of King T'Challa's death.

The film premiered at the El Capitan Theatre in Hollywood, Los Angeles, on October 26, 2022, and was released theatrically in the United States on November 11, 2022. Black Panther: Wakanda Forever has grossed over $859 million worldwide, becoming the sixth highest-grossing film of 2022. Rotten Tomatoes, a review aggregator, surveyed 417 reviews and judged 84% of them to be positive. Metacritic calculated a weighted average score of 67 out of 100 based on 62 reviews, indicating "generally favorable reviews".

Black Panther: Wakanda Forever has garnered numerous awards and nominations with most nominations recognizing the film itself, acting, costume design, production values, and soundtrack. Bassett received widespread acclaim for her performance as Queen Ramonda, for which she won the Golden Globe Award for Best Supporting Actress. She became the first actress to win a major individual acting award for a Marvel film. The film was nominated for five Academy Awards, one British Academy Film Award, six Critics' Choice Movie Awards (winning two), two Golden Globe Awards (winning one), and two Screen Actors Guild Awards.

== Accolades ==
Accolades received by Black Panther: Wakanda Forever
Award	Date of ceremony	Category	Recipient(s)	Result	Ref.
Hollywood Music in Media Awards	November 16, 2022	Best Original Score in a Sci-Fi Film	Ludwig Göransson	Nominated	
Hollywood Music in Media Awards	November 16, 2022	Best Original Song in a Feature Film	Tems, Rihanna, Ryan Coogler, and Ludwig Göransson for "Lift Me Up"	Won	
Hollywood Music in Media Awards	November 16, 2022	Song/Score – Trailer	"No Woman, No Cry" and "Alright"	Nominated	
Washington D.C. Area Film Critics Association Awards	December 12, 2022	Best Supporting Actress	Angela Bassett	Nominated	
Washington D.C. Area Film Critics Association Awards	December 12, 2022	Best Production Design	Hannah Beachler and Lisa Sessions Morgan	Won	
Chicago Film Critics Association Awards	December 14, 2022	Best Costume Design	Ruth E. Carter	Nominated	
St. Louis Gateway Film Critics Association Awards	December 18, 2022	Best Supporting Actress	Angela Bassett	Runner-up	
St. Louis Gateway Film Critics Association Awards	December 18, 2022	Best Costume Design	Ruth E. Carter	Runner-up	
St. Louis Gateway Film Critics Association Awards	December 18, 2022	Best Production Design	Hannah Beachler	Nominated	
St. Louis Gateway Film Critics Association Awards	December 18, 2022	Best Soundtrack	Black Panther: Wakanda Forever	Nominated	
Dallas–Fort Worth Film Critics Association	December 19, 2022	Best Supporting Actress	Angela Bassett	3rd place	
Alliance of Women Film Journalists Awards	January 5, 2023	Best Supporting Actress	Angela Bassett	Nominated	
Alliance of Women Film Journalists Awards	January 5, 2023	Best Ensemble Cast – Casting Director	Sarah Finn	Nominated	
San Diego Film Critics Society	January 6, 2023	Best Costume Design	Ruth E. Carter	Nominated	
San Francisco Bay Area Film Critics Circle	January 9, 2023	Best Supporting Actress	Angela Bassett	Nominated	
San Francisco Bay Area Film Critics Circle	January 9, 2023	Best Production Design	Hannah Beachler and Lisa K. Sessions	Nominated	
Golden Globe Awards	January 10, 2023	Best Supporting Actress – Motion Picture	Angela Bassett	Won	
Golden Globe Awards	January 10, 2023	Best Original Song	Temilade Openiyi, Robyn Fenty, Ryan Coogler, & Ludwig Göransson for "Lift Me Up"	Nominated	
Georgia Film Critics Association	January 13, 2023	Best Supporting Actress	Angela Bassett	Nominated	
Georgia Film Critics Association	January 13, 2023	Best Production Design	Hannah Beachler and Lisa K. Sessions	Nominated	
Georgia Film Critics Association	January 13, 2023	Best Original Score	Ludwig Göransson	Nominated	
Georgia Film Critics Association	January 13, 2023	Best Original Song	Tems, Rihanna, Ludwig Göransson, Ryan Coogler for "Lift Me Up"	Nominated	
Georgia Film Critics Association	January 13, 2023	Oglethorpe Award for Excellence in Georgia Cinema	Ryan Coogler, Joe Robert Cole	Nominated	
Critics' Choice Movie Awards	January 15, 2023	Best Supporting Actress	Angela Bassett	Won	
Critics' Choice Movie Awards	January 15, 2023	Best Costume Design	Ruth E. Carter	Won	
Critics' Choice Movie Awards	January 15, 2023	Best Production Design	Hannah Beachler and Lisa K. Sessions	Nominated	
Critics' Choice Movie Awards	January 15, 2023	Best Song	"Lift Me Up"	Nominated	
Critics' Choice Movie Awards	January 15, 2023	Best Hair and Makeup	Black Panther: Wakanda Forever	Nominated	
Critics' Choice Movie Awards	January 15, 2023	Best Visual Effects	Black Panther: Wakanda Forever	Nominated	
Seattle Film Critics Society	January 17, 2023	Best Actress in a Supporting Role	Angela Bassett	Nominated	
Seattle Film Critics Society	January 17, 2023	Best Costume Design	Ruth E. Carter	Nominated	
Online Film Critics Society Awards	January 23, 2023	Best Supporting Actress	Angela Bassett	Nominated	
Online Film Critics Society Awards	January 23, 2023	Best Costume Design	Black Panther: Wakanda Forever	Won	
AARP Movies for Grownups Awards	January 28, 2023	Best Supporting Actress	Angela Bassett	Nominated	
London Film Critics' Circle Awards	February 5, 2023	British Actress of the Year	Letitia Wright	Nominated	
London Film Critics' Circle Awards	February 5, 2023	Technical Achievement Award	Ruth E. Carter	Nominated	
Black Reel Awards	February 6, 2023	Outstanding Motion Picture	Black Panther: Wakanda Forever	Nominated	
Black Reel Awards	February 6, 2023	Outstanding Director	Ryan Coogler	Nominated	
Black Reel Awards	February 6, 2023	Outstanding Actress	Letitia Wright	Nominated	
Black Reel Awards	February 6, 2023	Outstanding Supporting Actress	Angela Bassett	Won	
Black Reel Awards	February 6, 2023	Outstanding Breakthrough Performance, Female	Dominique Thorne	Nominated	
Black Reel Awards	February 6, 2023	Outstanding Screenplay	Ryan Coogler and Joe Robert Cole	Nominated	
Black Reel Awards	February 6, 2023	Outstanding Original Song	"Lift Me Up"	Won	
Black Reel Awards	February 6, 2023	Outstanding Original Song	"Born Again"	Nominated	
Black Reel Awards	February 6, 2023	Outstanding Cinematography	Autumn Durald Arkapaw	Nominated	
Black Reel Awards	February 6, 2023	Outstanding Costume Design	Ruth E. Carter	Won	
Black Reel Awards	February 6, 2023	Outstanding Editing	Michael P. Shawver, Kelley Dixon, Jennifer Lame	Nominated	
Black Reel Awards	February 6, 2023	Outstanding Production Design	Hannah Beachler	Won	
Black Reel Awards	February 6, 2023	Outstanding Ensemble	Black Panther: Wakanda Forever	Nominated	
Black Reel Awards	February 6, 2023	Outstanding Original Soundtrack	Black Panther: Wakanda Forever	Won	
Make-Up Artists and Hair Stylists Guild	February 11, 2023	Best Contemporary Hair Styling in a Feature-Length Motion Picture	Camille Friend, Evelyn Feliciano, Marva Stokes, Victor Paz	Won	
Make-Up Artists and Hair Stylists Guild	February 11, 2023	Best Special Effects Make-Up in a Feature-Length Motion Picture	Joel Harlow, Kim Felix	Nominated	
Set Decorators Society of America Awards	February 14, 2023	Best Achievement in Decor/Design of a Science Fiction or Fantasy Feature Film	Lisa Sessions Morgan and Hannah Beachler	Nominated	
Society of Composers & Lyricists Awards	February 15, 2023	Outstanding Original Song for a Dramatic or Documentary Visual Media Production	Tems, Rihanna, Ludwig Göransson, and Ryan Coogler for "Lift Me Up"	Nominated	
Visual Effects Society Awards	February 15, 2023	Outstanding Effects Simulations in a Photoreal Feature	Matthew Hanger, Alexis Hall, Hang Yang, and Mikel Zuloaga for "City Street Flooding"	Nominated	
Art Directors Guild Awards	February 18, 2023	Excellence in Production Design for a Fantasy Film	Hannah Beachler	Nominated	
British Academy Film Awards	February 19, 2023	Best Actress in a Supporting Role	Angela Bassett	Nominated	
Dorian Awards	February 23, 2023	Supporting Film Performance of the Year	Angela Bassett	Nominated	
Hollywood Critics Association Awards	February 24, 2023	Best Supporting Actress	Angela Bassett	Won	
Hollywood Critics Association Awards	February 24, 2023	Best Action Film	Black Panther: Wakanda Forever	Nominated	
Hollywood Critics Association Creative Arts Awards	February 24, 2023	Best Costume Design	Ruth E. Carter	Won	
Hollywood Critics Association Creative Arts Awards	February 24, 2023	Best Hair & Makeup	Camille Friend and Joel Harlow	Nominated	
Hollywood Critics Association Creative Arts Awards	February 24, 2023	Best Marketing Campaign	Black Panther: Wakanda Forever	Nominated	
Hollywood Critics Association Creative Arts Awards	February 24, 2023	Best Original Song	Rihanna for "Lift Me Up"	Nominated	
Hollywood Critics Association Creative Arts Awards	February 24, 2023	Best Production Design	Hannah Beachler	Nominated	
NAACP Image Awards	February 25, 2023	Outstanding Motion Picture	Black Panther: Wakanda Forever	Won	
NAACP Image Awards	February 25, 2023	Outstanding Directing in a Motion Picture	Ryan Coogler	Nominated	
NAACP Image Awards	February 25, 2023	Outstanding Writing in a Motion Picture	Ryan Coogler	Won	
NAACP Image Awards	February 25, 2023	Outstanding Actress in a Motion Picture	Letitia Wright	Nominated	
NAACP Image Awards	February 25, 2023	Outstanding Supporting Actor in a Motion Picture	Tenoch Huerta Mejía	Won	
NAACP Image Awards	February 25, 2023	Outstanding Supporting Actress in a Motion Picture	Angela Bassett	Won	
NAACP Image Awards	February 25, 2023	Outstanding Supporting Actress in a Motion Picture	Danai Gurira	Nominated	
NAACP Image Awards	February 25, 2023	Outstanding Supporting Actress in a Motion Picture	Lupita Nyong'o	Nominated	
NAACP Image Awards	February 25, 2023	Outstanding Ensemble Cast in a Motion Picture	The cast of Black Panther: Wakanda Forever	Won	
NAACP Image Awards	February 25, 2023	Outstanding Costume Design	Ruth E. Carter	Won	
NAACP Image Awards	February 25, 2023	Outstanding Hairstyling	Camille Friend	Won	
NAACP Image Awards	February 25, 2023	Outstanding Soundtrack/Compilation Album	Black Panther: Wakanda Forever	Won	
NAACP Image Awards	February 25, 2023	Outstanding Soul/R&B Song	Rihanna for "Lift Me Up"	Nominated	
NAACP Image Awards	February 25, 2023	Outstanding Music Video/Visual Album	Rihanna for "Lift Me Up"	Won	
NAACP Image Awards	February 25, 2023	Outstanding International Song	Tems for "No Woman, No Cry"	Won	
Producers Guild of America Awards	February 25, 2023	Outstanding Producer of Theatrical Motion Pictures	Kevin Feige and Nate Moore	Nominated	
Screen Actors Guild Awards	February 26, 2023	Outstanding Performance by a Female Actor in a Supporting Role	Angela Bassett	Nominated	
Screen Actors Guild Awards	February 26, 2023	Outstanding Performance by a Stunt Ensemble in a Motion Picture	Black Panther: Wakanda Forever	Nominated	
Costume Designers Guild Awards	February 27, 2023	Excellence in Sci-Fi/Fantasy Film	Ruth E. Carter	Nominated	
African-American Film Critics Association Awards	March 1, 2023	Top 10 Films of the Year	Black Panther: Wakanda Forever	2nd place	
African-American Film Critics Association Awards	March 1, 2023	Best Supporting Actress	Angela Bassett	Won	
African-American Film Critics Association Awards	March 1, 2023	Best Song	"Lift Me Up"	Won	
African-American Film Critics Association Awards	March 1, 2023	Building Change Award	Hannah Beachler	Won	
African-American Film Critics Association Awards	March 1, 2023	The Ashley Boone Award	Nate Moore	Won	
The ReFrame Stamp	March 1, 2023	—N/a	Black Panther: Wakanda Forever	Won	
Satellite Awards	March 3, 2023	Best Motion Picture – Drama	Black Panther: Wakanda Forever	Nominated	
Satellite Awards	March 3, 2023	Best Supporting Actress – Motion Picture	Angela Bassett	Nominated	
Satellite Awards	March 3, 2023	Best Costume Design	Ruth E. Carter	Nominated	
Satellite Awards	March 3, 2023	Best Original Song	Tems, Rihanna, Ryan Coogler, and Ludwig Göransson for "Lift Me Up"	Nominated	
Nickelodeon Kids' Choice Awards	March 4, 2023	Favorite Movie	Black Panther: Wakanda Forever	Nominated	
Nickelodeon Kids' Choice Awards	March 4, 2023	Favorite Movie Actress	Lupita Nyong'o	Nominated	
Nickelodeon Kids' Choice Awards	March 4, 2023	Favorite Movie Actress	Letitia Wright	Nominated	
Nickelodeon Kids' Choice Awards	March 4, 2023	Favorite Song	Rihanna for "Lift Me Up"	Nominated	
Guild of Music Supervisors Awards	March 5, 2023	Best Music Supervision for Films Budgeted Over $25 Million	Dave Jordan	Nominated	
Guild of Music Supervisors Awards	March 5, 2023	Best Song Written and/or Recorded Created for a Film	Rihanna, Ludwig Göransson, Ryan Coogler, Tems, and Dave Jordan for "Lift Me Up"	Nominated	
Guild of Music Supervisors Awards	March 5, 2023	Best Music Supervision in a Trailer – Film	Evelin Garcia for "Leaders"	Won	
Writers Guild of America Awards	March 5, 2023	Best Adapted Screenplay	Ryan Coogler and Joe Robert Cole	Nominated	
Academy Awards	March 12, 2023	Best Supporting Actress	Angela Bassett	Nominated	
Academy Awards	March 12, 2023	Best Original Song	"Lift Me Up" - Music by Temilade Openiyi, Robyn Fenty, Ryan Coogler, & Ludwig Göransson; Lyrics by Temilade Openiyi & Ryan Coogler	Nominated	
Academy Awards	March 12, 2023	Best Makeup and Hairstyling	Camille Friend and Joel Harlow	Nominated	
Academy Awards	March 12, 2023	Best Costume Design	Ruth Carter	Won	
Academy Awards	March 12, 2023	Best Visual Effects	Geoffrey Baumann, Craig Hammack, R. Christopher White and Dan Sudick	Nominated	
Critics' Choice Super Awards	March 16, 2023	Best Superhero Movie	Black Panther: Wakanda Forever	Nominated	
Critics' Choice Super Awards	March 16, 2023	Best Actor in a Superhero Movie	Tenoch Huerta Mejía	Nominated	
Critics' Choice Super Awards	March 16, 2023	Best Actress in a Superhero Movie	Angela Bassett	Won	
Critics' Choice Super Awards	March 16, 2023	Best Actress in a Superhero Movie	Letitia Wright	Nominated	
Critics' Choice Super Awards	March 16, 2023	Best Villain in a Movie	Tenoch Huerta Mejía	Nominated	
MTV Movie & TV Awards	May 7, 2023	Best Movie	Black Panther: Wakanda Forever	Nominated	
MTV Movie & TV Awards	May 7, 2023	Best Kick-Ass Cast	Black Panther: Wakanda Forever	Nominated	
MTV Movie & TV Awards	May 7, 2023	Best Song	Rihanna – "Lift Me Up"	Nominated	
BET Awards	June 25, 2023	Best Movie	Black Panther: Wakanda Forever	Won	
BET Awards	June 25, 2023	Best Actress	Angela Bassett (Note: Also for 9-1-1)	Won	
BET Awards	June 25, 2023	BET Her Award	"Lift Me Up" – Robyn Fenty & Ludwig Göransson	Nominated	
Hugo Awards	October 18–22, 2023	Best Dramatic Presentation, Long Form	Ryan Coogler and Joe Robert Cole	Nominated	
Billboard Music Awards	November 19, 2023	Top Soundtrack	Black Panther: Wakanda Forever	Nominated	
Grammy Awards	February 4, 2024	Best Compilation Soundtrack for Visual Media	Black Panther: Wakanda Forever	Nominated	
Grammy Awards	February 4, 2024	Best Score Soundtrack Album for Visual Media	Ludwig Göransson	Nominated	
Grammy Awards	February 4, 2024	Best Song Written for Visual Media	"Lift Me Up" – Songwriters by Ryan Coogler, Ludwig Göransson, Robyn Fenty and Temilade Openiyi	Nominated	
Saturn Awards	February 4, 2024	Best Comic-to-Film Motion Picture	Black Panther: Wakanda Forever	Nominated	
Saturn Awards	February 4, 2024	Best Supporting Actress in a Film	Angela Bassett	Nominated	
Saturn Awards	February 4, 2024	Best Film Costume	Ruth E. Carter	Nominated	
