= Dorothy Steel (actress) =

American film and television actress (1926–2021)

- Publicity Photo of Dorothy Steel
- Born: February 23, 1926; Detroit, Michigan, U.S.
- Died: October 15, 2021 (aged 95); Detroit, Michigan, U.S.
- Occupation(s): Film and television actress
- Years active: 2014–2021

Dorothy Steel (February 23, 1926 – October 15, 2021) was an American actress. Having started her career at the age of 88, she played minor characters in several high-profile films including Black Panther, Poms, Jumanji: The Next Level, and her final film, Black Panther: Wakanda Forever.

== Life and career ==
Born in Detroit, Michigan, on February 23, 1926, she lived in Atlanta, Georgia for many years. She worked for many years as a senior revenue officer for the Internal Revenue Service, retiring from the service on December 7, 1984. After living in the United States Virgin Islands for 20 years, Steel relocated to Atlanta to live closer to her son and grandson. By 2014, Steel began acting in community theater at the Frank Bailey Senior Center in Riverdale, and soon began to receive roles in locally made films. Steel died at her home in her native Detroit on October 15, 2021, at the age of 95.

== Filmography ==
Year	Title	Role	Notes
2015	The Trouble with Going Somewhere	Mrs. Williams	episode: "Paranoia All Over You"
2016	Black Majick	Ms. Mattie	short film
2016	The Refuge	Martha	short film
2016	Merry Christmas, Baby	Older Woman	TV film
2017	Daisy Winters	Louise	
2018	Black Panther	Merchant Tribe Elder	
2016-2018	Saints & Sinners	Mother Harris	4 episodes, recurring role
2019	Poms	Dorris	
2019	Christmas Wishes and Mistletoe Kisses	Dolores	TV film (as Dorothy M. Steel)
2019	The Oval	Pharmacy Customer	episode: "Rats Can Smell Poison" (as Dorothy M. Steel)
2019	Jumanji: The Next Level	Village Elder	
2020	Emperor	Slave	
2022	Black Panther: Wakanda Forever	Merchant Tribe Elder	Posthumous release (Final film role) / Dedicated to her memory
