= Robert Zimmerman =

Robert Zimmerman may refer to:

- Robert Allen Zimmerman, birth name of Bob Dylan (born 1941), American singer-songwriter
- Robert C. Zimmerman (1910–1996), Wisconsin Secretary of State
- Robert D. Zimmerman (born 1952), author
- Robert Zimmerman (swimmer) (1881–1980), Canadian swimmer
- Robert Zimmerman, brother of George Zimmerman
- Robert Zimmerman, Democratic nominee in the 2022 New York 3rd congressional district election

== See also ==
- Robert Zimmermann (disambiguation)
