= ASEA Rz =

Rz
Type and origin
- Power type: Electric
- Builder: ASEA
- Build date: 1982
- Total produced: 1
Specifications
- Configuration
  - UIC: Bo′Bo′
- Gauge: 1,435 mm (4 ft 8 1/2 in)
- Length: 15,520 mm (50 ft 11 in)
- Loco weight: 81 tonnes (80 long tons; 89 short tons)
- Electric system/s: 15 kV 16.7 Hz AC catenary
- Current pickup(s): Pantograph
Performance figures
- Maximum speed: 160 km/h (99 mph)
- Power output: 4,000 kW (5,400 hp)

Rz was an electric locomotive built by ASEA to test out asynchronous motors. It was built in 1982 and closely related to the Rc-series. It was test run until 1989 on Siljansbanan, but there was never any mass production of it.

== Later developments ==
After ASEA merged with Brown, Boveri & Cie to form Asea Brown Boveri in 1988 the development of asynchronous motors was moved to Switzerland. The Rz technology was utilized for the development of the X2-train and the Rc5-locomotive.

== Disposal ==
In 1992 the engine was donated to the Swedish Railway Museum, but they were not particularly interested in it and in 1999 it was moved to Örebro to become a parts locomotive.
