= Robert Zimmermann (footballer) =

East German footballer

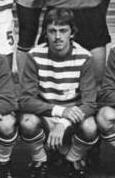
- Zimmermann in 1983

Personal information
- Date of birth: 21 May 1963 (age 63)
- Place of birth: East Germany
- Position: Forward

Youth career
- BSG Wismut Gera

Senior career*
Years	Team	Apps	(Gls)
1982–1990	FC Carl Zeiss Jena	94	(8)
1990–1991	1. FC Kaiserslautern	1	(0)
1991–1994	KSV Hessen Kassel	68	(13)
Total		163	(21)
- * Club domestic league appearances and goals

Robert Zimmermann (born 21 May 1963) is a German former footballer. He spent one season in the Bundesliga with 1. FC Kaiserslautern.

== Honours ==
- Bundesliga champion: 1991.
