= Lexus RZ =

Battery electric luxury crossover SUV

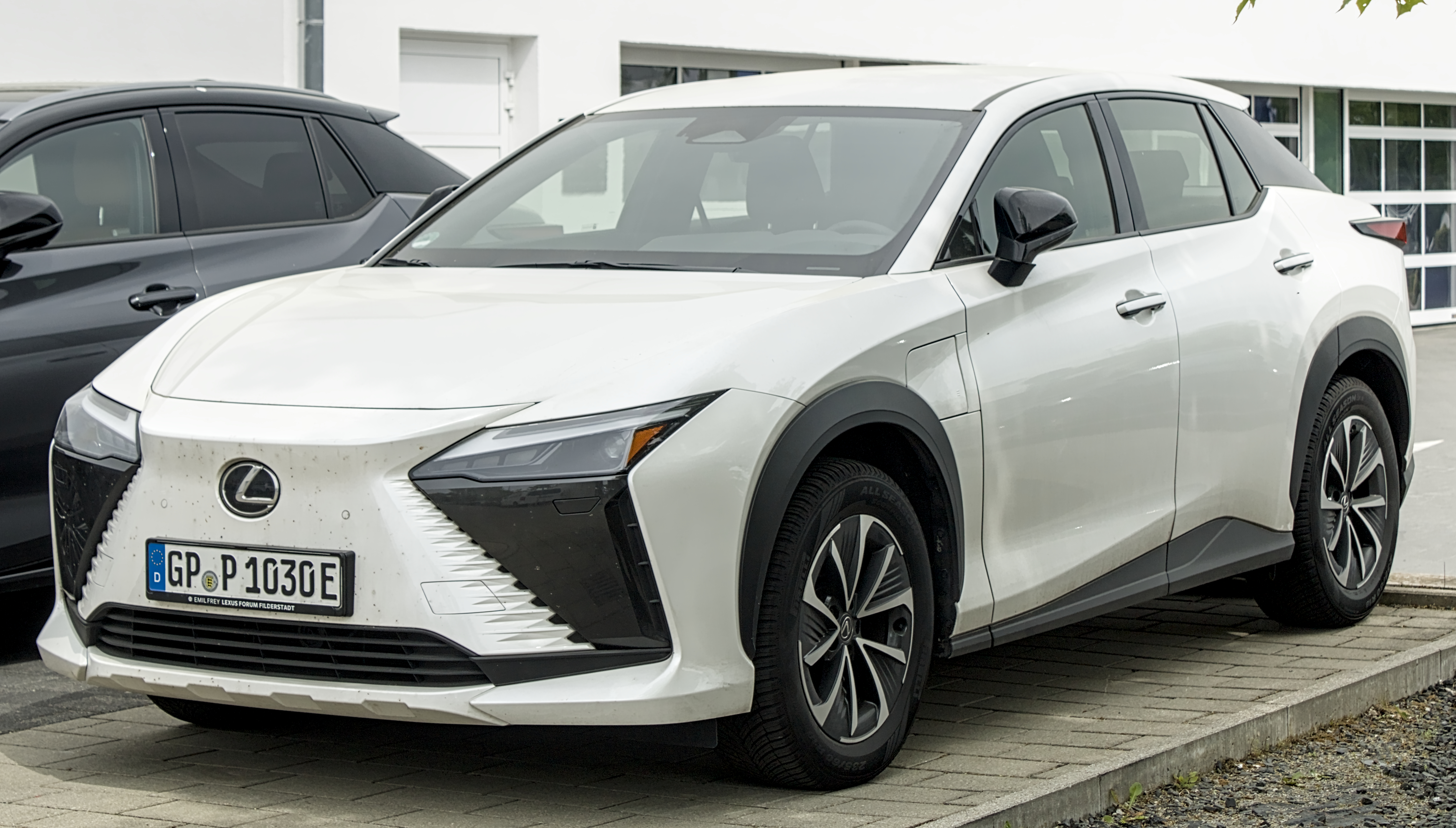
- Lexus RZ 300e (XEBM10, Germany)

Overview
- Manufacturer: Toyota
- Model code: EB10; EB20
- Production: 2023–present
- Model years: 2023–present
- Assembly: Japan: Toyota, Aichi (Motomachi plant)
- Designer: Daichi Kimura

Body and chassis
- Class: Mid-size luxury crossover SUV
- Body style: 5-door SUV
- Layout: Front-motor, front-wheel-drive; Dual-motor, all-wheel-drive (Direct4)
- Platform: e-TNGA
- Related: Toyota bZ4X/bZ / Subaru Solterra; Toyota C-HR+/C-HR / Subaru Uncharted; Toyota bZ4X Touring/bZ Woodland / Subaru Trailseeker/E-Outback

Powertrain
- Electric motor: 1×150 kW (201 hp; 204 PS) 1XM AC permanent magnet synchronous (front) + 1×80 kW (107 hp; 109 PS) 1YM AC permanent magnet synchronous (rear) (XEBM15)
- Power output: 150–313 kW (201–420 hp; 204–426 PS)
- Transmission: eAxle
- Battery: 71.4 kWh NMC PPES; 72.8 kWh NMC CATL; 77 kWh NMC PPES
- Electric range: 500–600 km (311–373 mi) (NEDC); 450 km (280 mi) (WLTC); 200–301 mi (322–484 km) (EPA)
- Plug-in charging: 150 kW DC

Dimensions
- Wheelbase: 2,850 mm (112.2 in)
- Length: 4,805 mm (189.2 in)
- Width: 1,895 mm (74.6 in)
- Height: 1,635 mm (64.4 in)

The Lexus RZ (Japanese: レクサス・RZ, Hepburn: Rekusasu RZ) is a battery electric mid-size luxury crossover SUV built by Toyota for its luxury division Lexus since 2023. It is considered a "large SUV" by Euro NCAP and a "small sport utility vehicle" by the United States Environmental Protection Agency. The RZ is built on the e-TNGA platform shared with the Toyota bZ4X/Subaru Solterra, it is the first dedicated battery electric vehicle of the Lexus marque that will be sold worldwide and also the second battery electric model after the ICE-based UX 300e.

== History ==
The RZ was previewed by the LF-Z Electrified concept in March 2021. A prototype RZ was shown in December 2021 during a Toyota press event to announce its future plans for rolling out battery electric models. The production model was unveiled at a press event on April 20, 2022, and it was first shown to the public at Le Volan Cars Meet 2022 Yokohama in late May. The RZ was developed at Toyota's Technical Center Shimoyama.

It went on sale in 2022 (as the 2023 model year in North America), initially in RZ 450e grade, which is equipped with a standard fully variable "Direct4" all-wheel drive system and optional steer-by-wire technology.

In June 2025, Lexus announced an updated version of the RZ that brings improvements to the battery and motor output as well as a new F Sport version with 'Lexus’ Interactive Manual Drive', a virtual gear shift system that mimics the feel of a manual transmission.

== Design ==
=== Powertrains ===
Model	Chassis code	Electric motor	Transmission	Power	Torque	Combined Power
RZ 300e	XEBM10	1×1XM (front)	eAxle	150 kW (201 hp; 204 PS)	265 N⋅m (195 lb⋅ft)	
RZ 450e	XEBM15	1×1XM (front)	eAxle	150 kW (201 hp; 204 PS)	265 N⋅m (195 lb⋅ft)	230 kW (308 hp; 313 PS)
RZ 450e	XEBM15	1×1YM (rear)	eAxle	80 kW (107 hp; 109 PS)	170 N⋅m (130 lb⋅ft)	230 kW (308 hp; 313 PS)
RZ 350e				165 kW (221 hp; 224 PS)		
RZ 500e						280 kW (375 hp; 381 PS)
RZ 550e	XEBM25					300 kW (402 hp; 408 PS)
RZ 600e F Sport Performance						313 kW (420 hp; 426 PS)

The front motor of the RZ 450e is taken from the front-wheel drive version of the bZ4X, while the rear unit is taken from the all-wheel drive version of the same car, making it quicker than the bZ4X/Solterra. Using the 'DIRECT4' system, front/rear axle torque output can be varied continuously from 100:0 to 0:100; during normal driving, the torque split ranges from 40:60 to 60:40.

The storage battery is identical to the bZ4X/Solterra, with a capacity of 71.4 kWh. The RZ 450e has an estimated range of 320–360 km (200–225 mi) under the EPA driving cycle, depending on wheel size. The maximum charging rate is 150 kW. Four levels of regenerative braking are available; the lowest level eliminates regeneration entirely and relies on the mechanical (hydraulic) brake system. According to the RZ 450e chief engineer Takashi Watanabe, this was done to provide a more conventional braking feel. At maximum regeneration, the deceleration rate is 0.15 g_{0} (1.5 m/s^{2}).

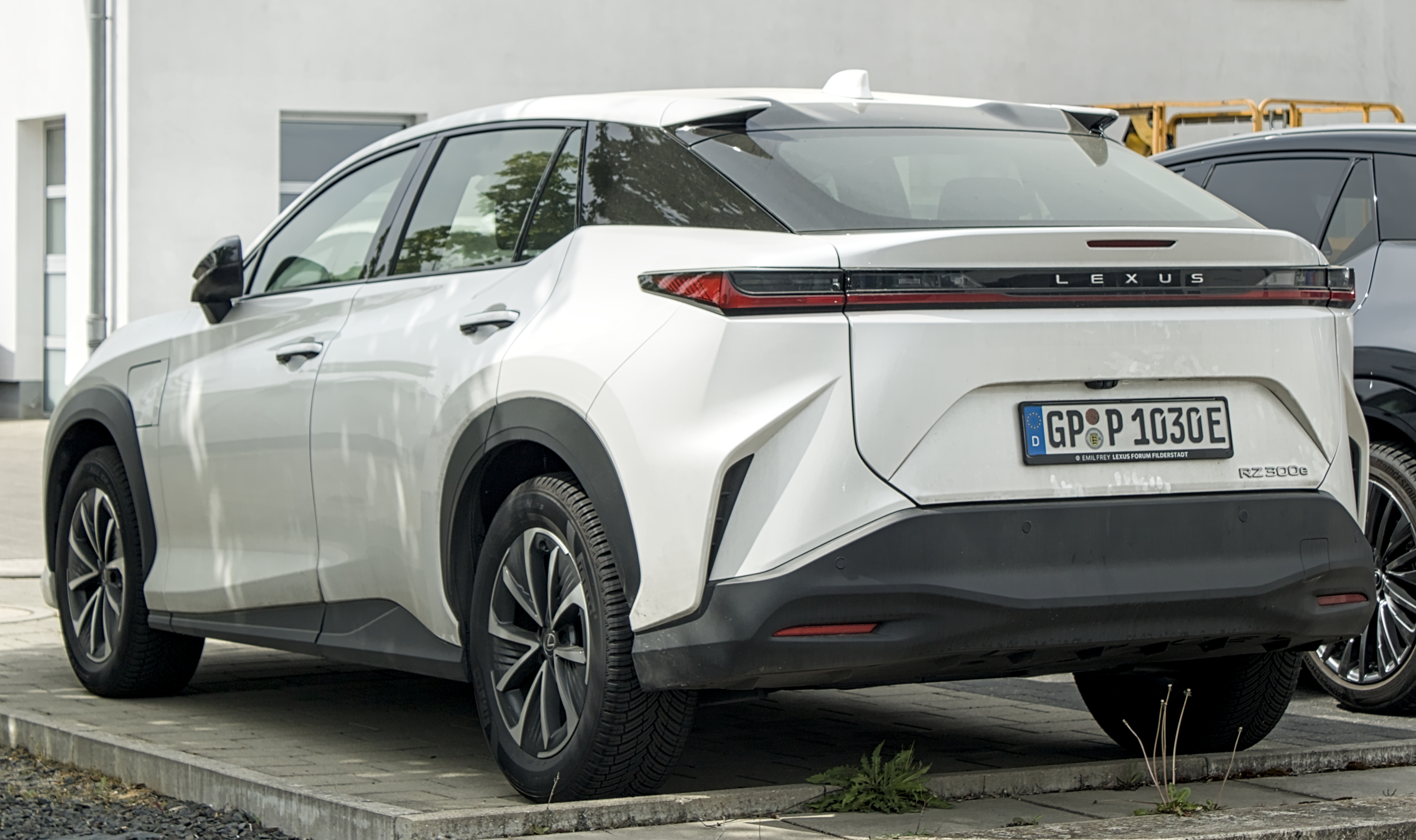
Rear

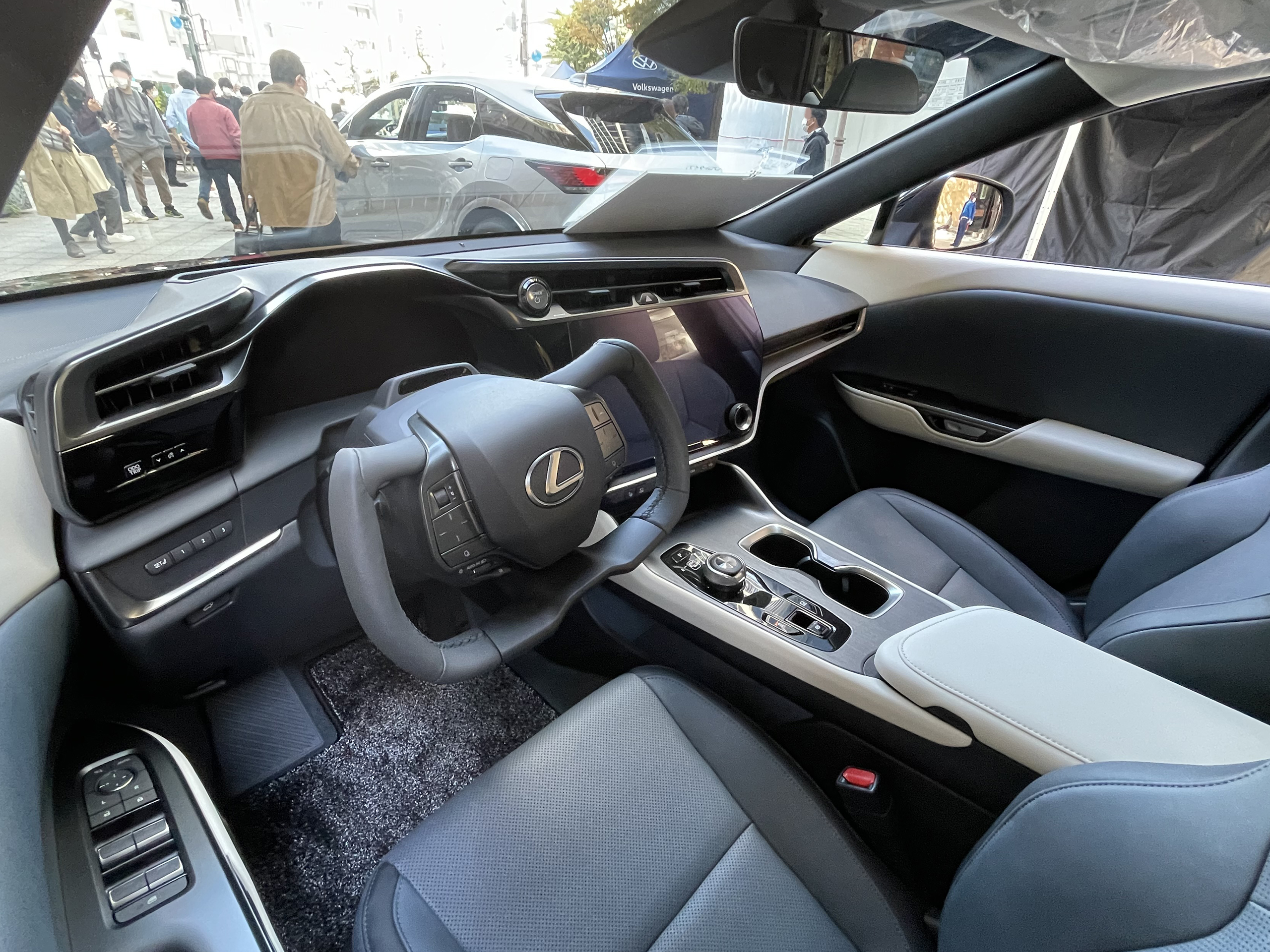
Interior

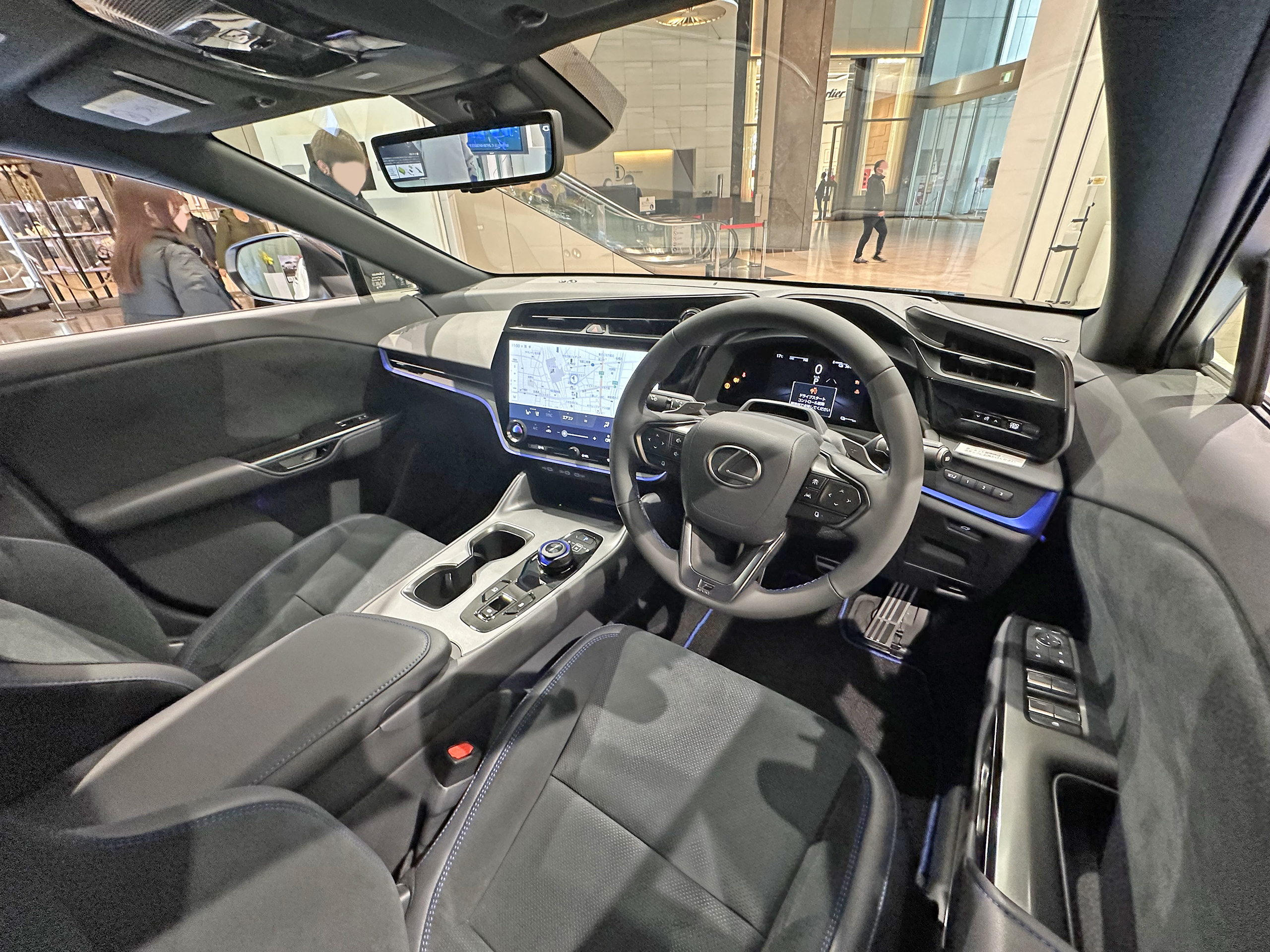
Interior (with conventional steering wheel)

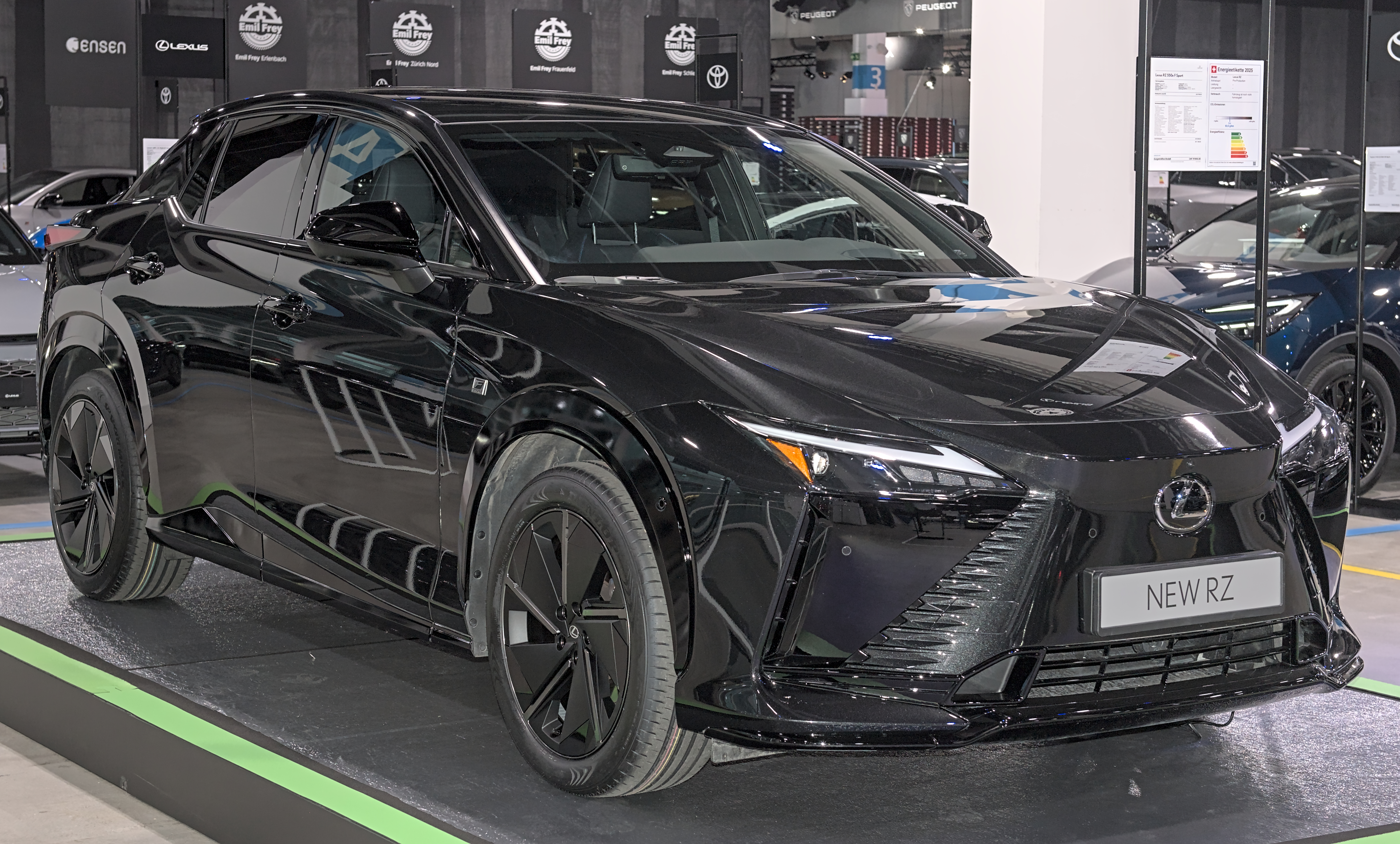
Lexus RZ 550e F Sport

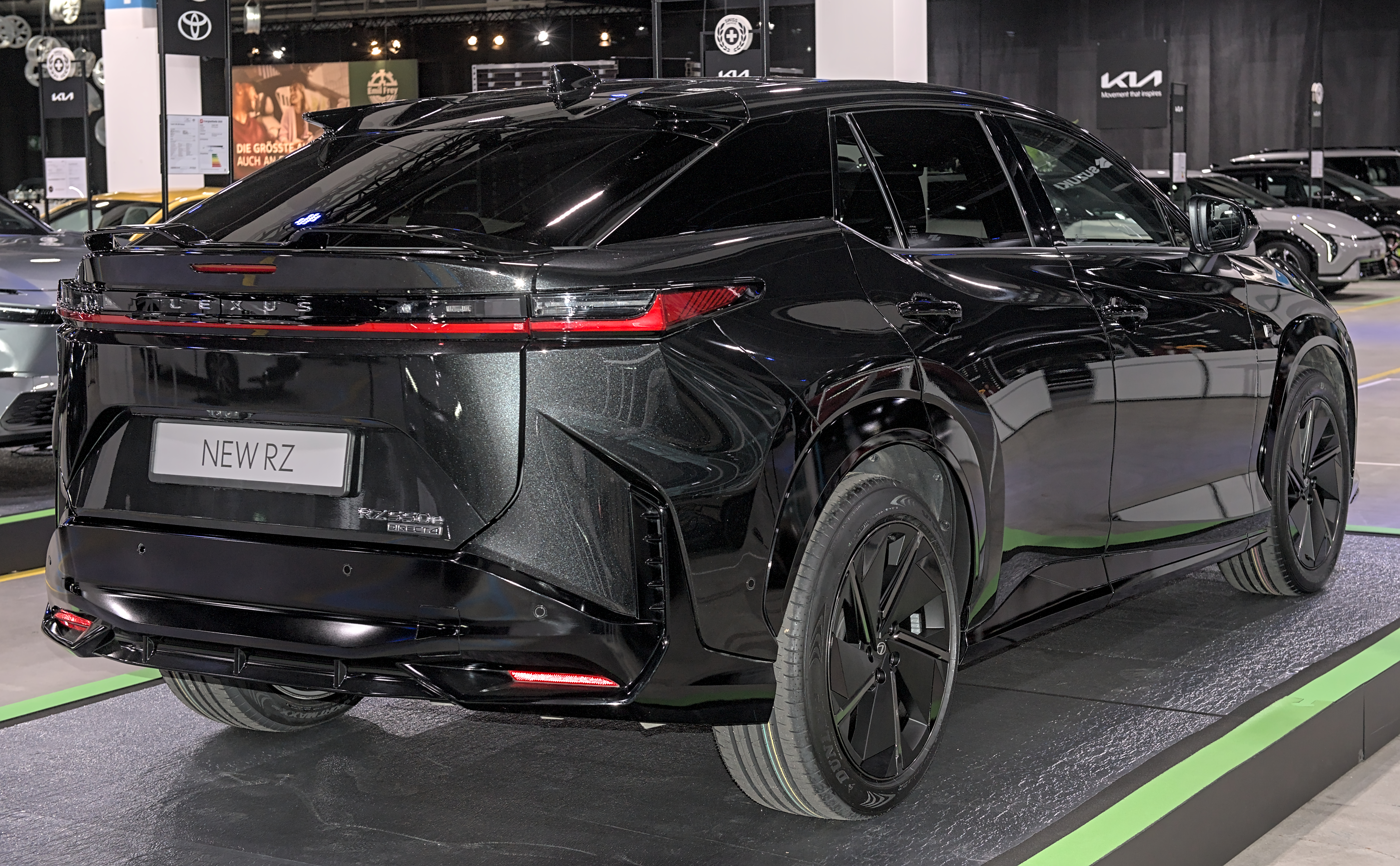
Rear

=== Steer-by-wire system ===
The steer-by-wire system, which Lexus have branded "One Motion Grip" for some markets, comes with a steering yoke and removes the physical connection between the yoke and the steering rack. The position of the yoke is used to drive a motor attached to the steering rack, while a second motor provides feedback to the yoke itself. The effort required to turn the yoke varies in response to driving conditions. Regardless of the situation, the total rotational range of motion is 300 degrees, which removes any need to perform a hand-over-hand movement for which a conventional steering wheel may be more suitable. In a hands-on test, Motor Trend called the yoke "little more than a novelty" but declared the "steering system that minimizes movement by instantly and intuitively adjusting to ever-changing conditions ... [is] a brilliant bit of engineering that could well change driving for the better". It was not offered in US-spec RZ and was replaced with the conventional steering wheel.

=== Chassis ===
The chassis takes advantage of structural adhesives, laser-based welding processes, and high-tensile steel to enhance rigidity and reduce weight; the hood is aluminum and the battery is carried underneath the passenger floor, contributing to the vehicle's low center of gravity. The e-TNGA platform has a fully-independent suspension, with MacPherson struts in front and trailing-arm double-wishbones in the rear.

=== Styling ===
Six exterior and three interior colors are available; as an option, the exterior can be painted in a bi-tone finish, with the black "spindle" grille accent extended over the hood and roof. The low hoodline and active grille shutter reduce aerodynamic resistance; in addition, the underbody is dimpled to create minute vortices and a roof spoiler is used to enhance downforce.

== F Sport Performance models ==
=== RZ450e F Sport Performance ===
At Tokyo Auto Salon 2023, a F Sport variant LEXUS RZ SPORT CONCEPT Showcased as a concept vehicle. Features a redesigned front bumper, a rear spoiler and overfenders.

The production model was announced in January 2024. Based on RZ450e, the production identical to the concept model except L emblem. The alterations kick off with a thoroughly revised front fascia with a splitter clad in carbon fibre as well as a large carbon panel positioned directly below the headlights. Production is limited only 100 units in Japan.

The RZ450e "F Sport Performance" shares the same two-motor 4WD powertrain as the standard model, the RZ450e "Version L".

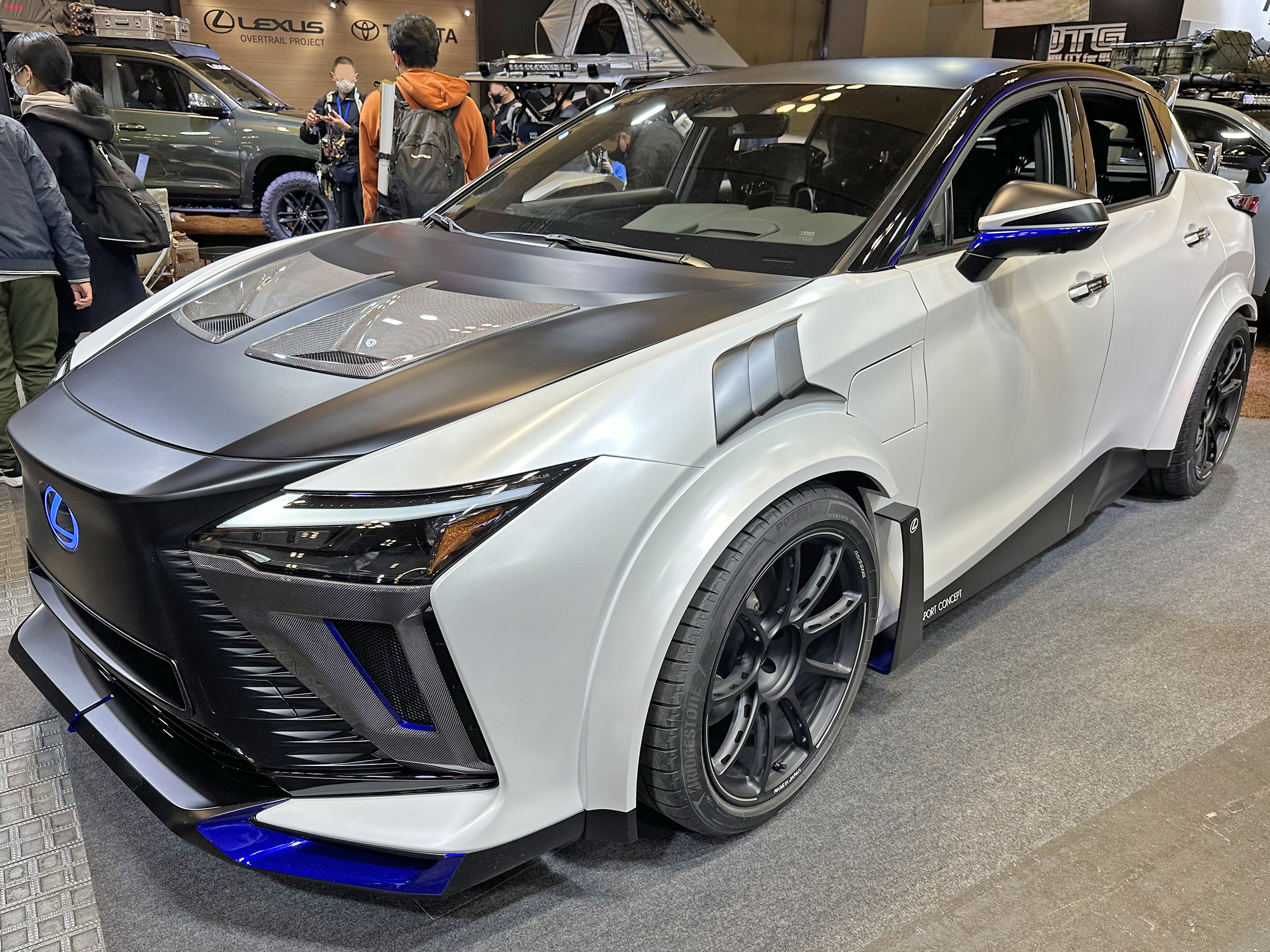
RZ Sport Concept

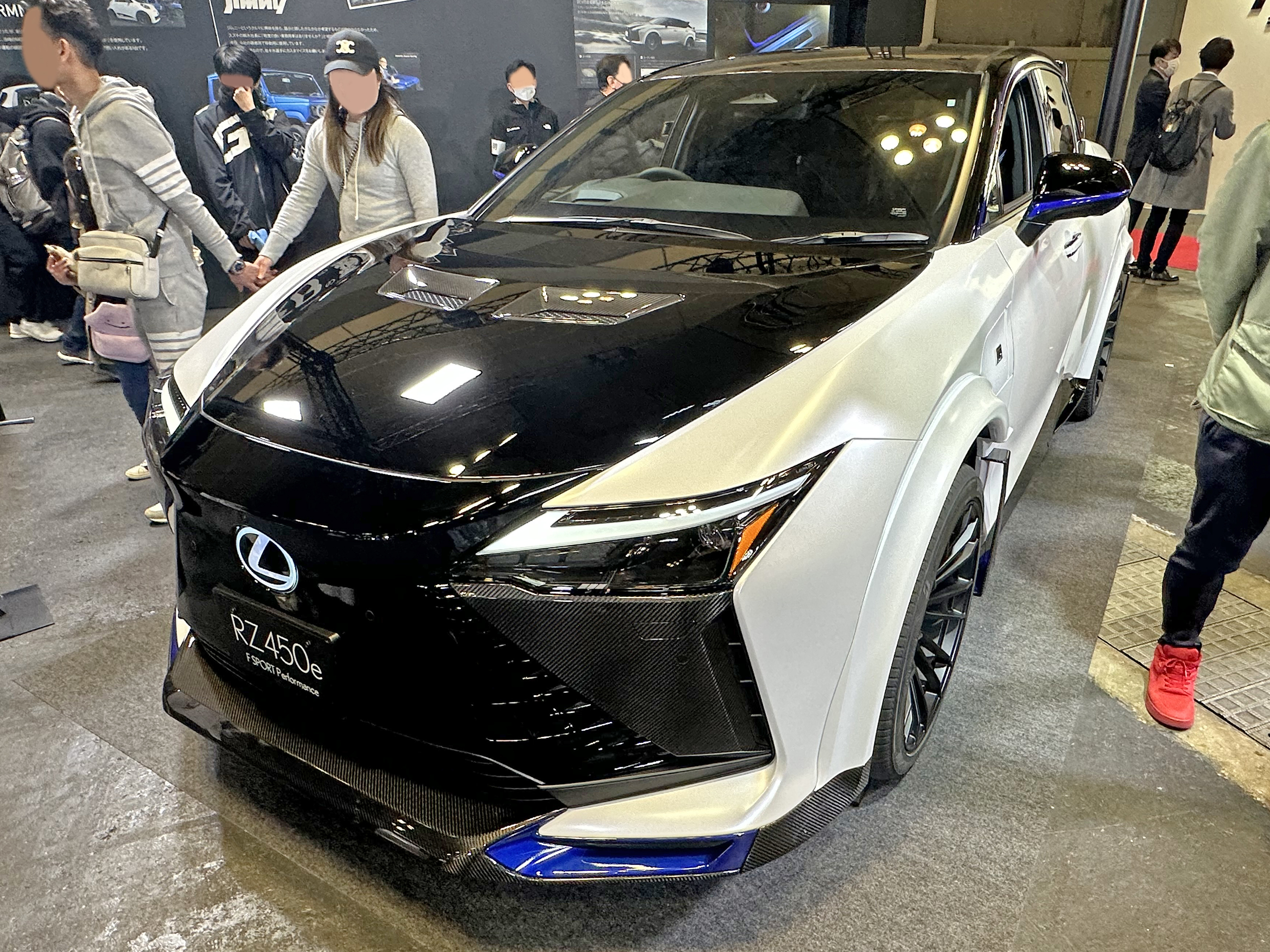
Front

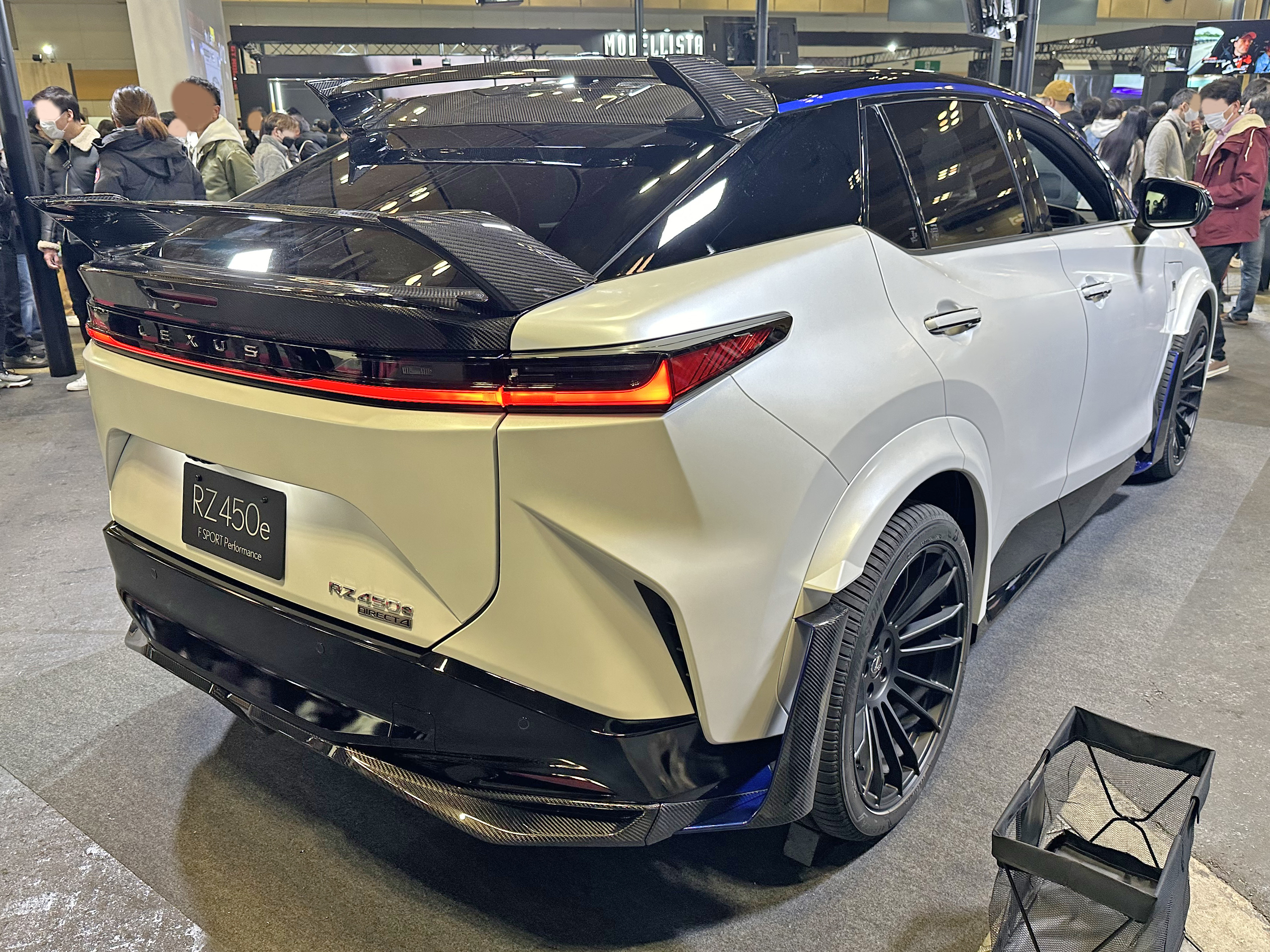
Rear view

=== RZ600e F Sport Performance ===
Toyota has announced a special model: RZ600e F Sport Performance, which will be available at dealers on 2 March 2026. The design is very identical to the previous limited RZ450e F Sport Performance model.

The RZ600e F Sport Performance ground clearance 20 mm lower than the RZ550e F Sport. Based on the RZ 550e "F SPORT," which features a comprehensively renewed BEV system, the Special Edition RZ 600e "F SPORT Performance".

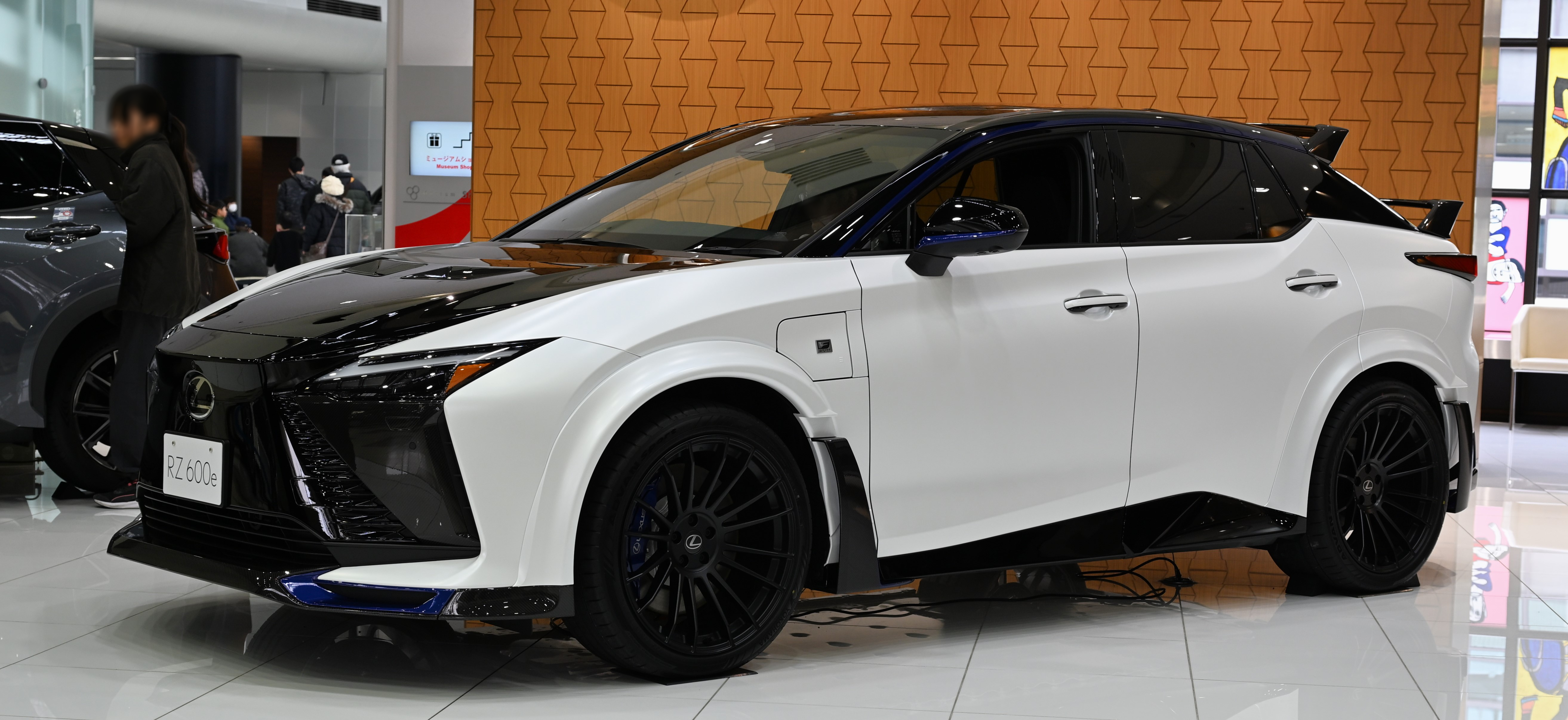
Front

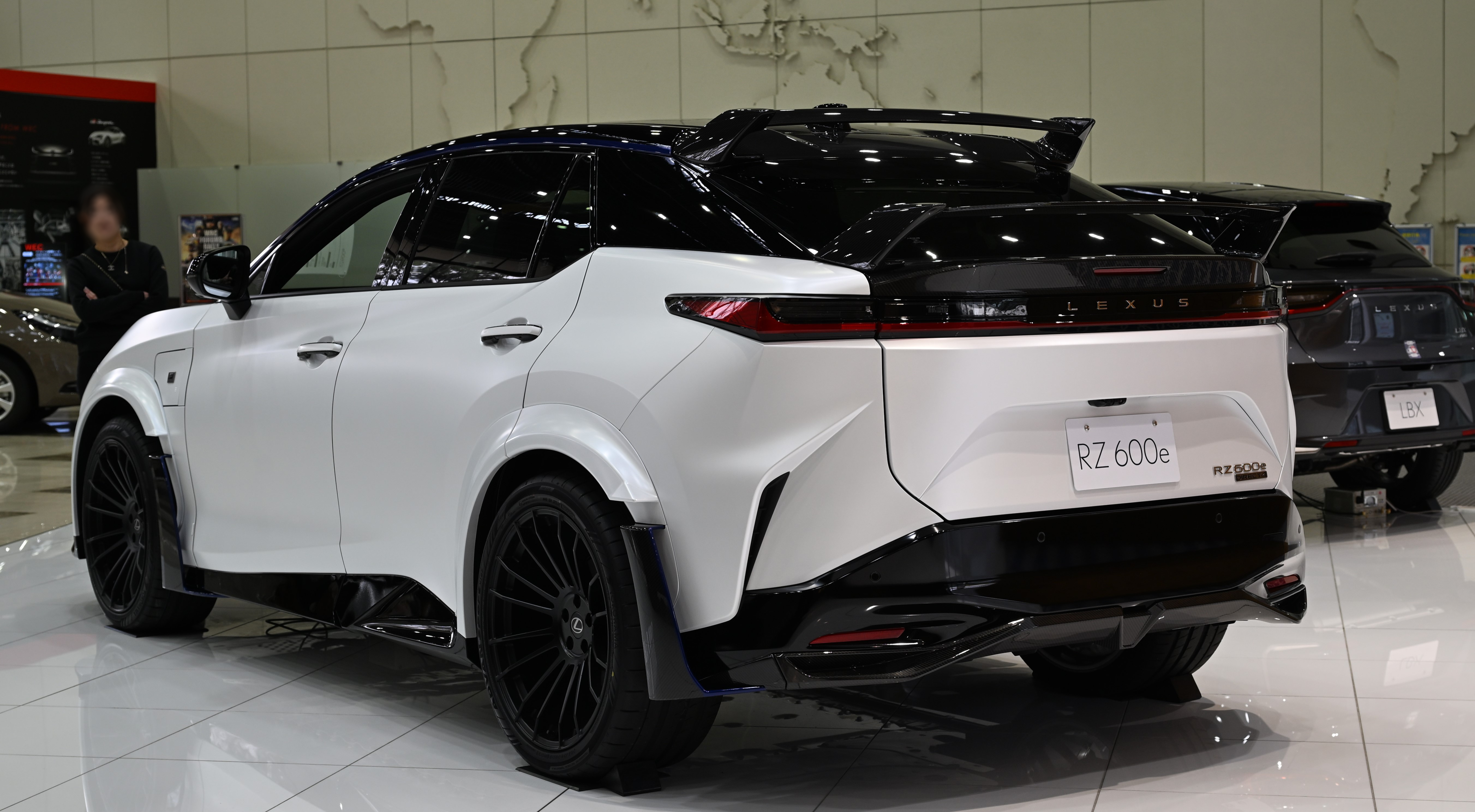
Rear view

== Safety ==
=== ANCAP ===
ANCAP test results Lexus RZ see ANCAP Safety Report (2023, aligned with Euro NCAP)
Test	Points	%
Overall:	5 /5 stars	
Adult occupant:	35.09	87%
Child occupant:	44	89%
Pedestrian:	58.38	84%
Safety assist:	15.20	84%

=== Euro NCAP ===
Euro NCAP test results Lexus RZ 71kWh electric 'Executive' (LHD) (2023)
Test	Points	%
Overall:	5 /5 stars	
Adult occupant:	35.1	87%
Child occupant:	43	87%
Pedestrian:	53.4	84%
Safety assist:	14.7	81%

=== IIHS ===
IIHS scores (2023)
Small overlap front (driver)	Good
Small overlap front (passenger)	Good
Moderate overlap front (original test)	Good
Side (updated test)	Good
Headlights	Acceptable
Front crash prevention: Vehicle-to-Pedestrian (Day)	Superior
Front crash prevention: Vehicle-to-Pedestrian (Night)	Superior
Child seat anchors (LATCH) ease of use	Good+

== Sales ==
Year	Japan	US	Europe	China
2023	1,364	5,386	2,023	5,250
2024		9,697		2,937
2025		6,400		547
