= Peugeot RCZ Vision =

Electric concept car

Overview
- Manufacturer: Peugeot

Body and chassis
- Class: Concept car
- Body style: 2-door 2+2 coupé
- Platform: STLA One

Dimensions
- Length: 4,650 mm (183.1 in)
- Width: 1,940 mm (76.4 in)
- Height: 1,350 mm (53.1 in)

The Peugeot RCZ Vision is a concept car developed by French automaker Peugeot. It is a sports coupé that shares its name with a 2010 production car, the Peugeot RCZ. It was presented at the 2026 Paris Motor Show on 12 October 2026, together with the E-T16 concept.

== Overview ==
Rear view

The RCZ Vision serves as a study into Peugeot's future design and technology. Peugeot has provided no confirmation that it will preview a production model.

The RCZ Vision previews Peugeot's upcoming Feline Future design language. It takes some design inspiration from the 2010 production RCZ, though it is significantly longer, with a length of approximately 4.65 meters. The front and rear fascias incorporate a "three claw" light signature, while the typical coupe roofline is shaped in a double bubble shape, similar to the original car. It uses 21-inch and 22-inch forged aluminium wheels in the front and rear respectively, with triangular detailing recalling the wheels of the original car.

The RCZ vision's interior also previews an upcoming i-Cockpit layout. This includes a rounded rectangular "Hypersquare" steering wheel, which is connected to the drivetrain via steer-by-wire technology with a variable steering ratio. It features a 2+2 seating configuration, recycled leather upholstery, asymmetrical front seats, and two frameless transparent micro-LED displays. It also features an analog clock by Serica. It features regenerative braking, and is the first Peugeot to use brake-by-wire technology.

== Powertrain and chassis ==
The RCZ Vision is the first Stellantis vehicle to feature a solid-state battery. Although its specifications are unconfirmed, Peugeot claims that it will be able to achieve an efficiency of 5.4 mi/kWh (8.7 km/kWh), providing 375 mi (604 km) of driving range. At its thinnest point, the battery is 110 mm (4.3 in) thick. Its electric motors produce a total of 493 hp (500 PS; 368 kW).

It is underpinned by Stellantis' 1000-volt STLA One platform, allowing a charge from 10% to 80% in under 10 minutes. A software control system known as the STLA Brain handles autonomous driving and other technologies such as steer-by-wire.
