= GMC Denali =

Highest trim level for GMC vehicles

Denali
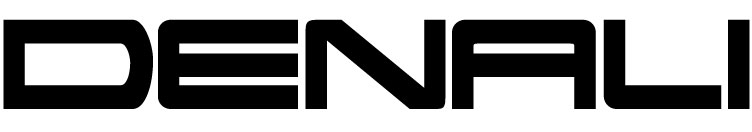
- Product type: Luxury automobiles
- Current owner: General Motors
- Produced by: General Motors
- Country: United States
- Introduced: 1999; 27 years ago
- Website: gmc.com/denali

Denali is a nameplate used by GMC for its highest trim level on its vehicles. Vehicles with the Denali trim option carry list prices up to 41% higher than the base models.

The Denali nameplate is often used as an insignia and as a premium alternative to General Motors' luxury brand, Cadillac. The Yukon Denali line typically represents 40% of Yukon sales in both units and dollars. In 2013 it sold more than 75,558 units of the Denali brand, which accounted for 20% of GMC's sales, making it one of GM's most successful sub-brands.

== History ==
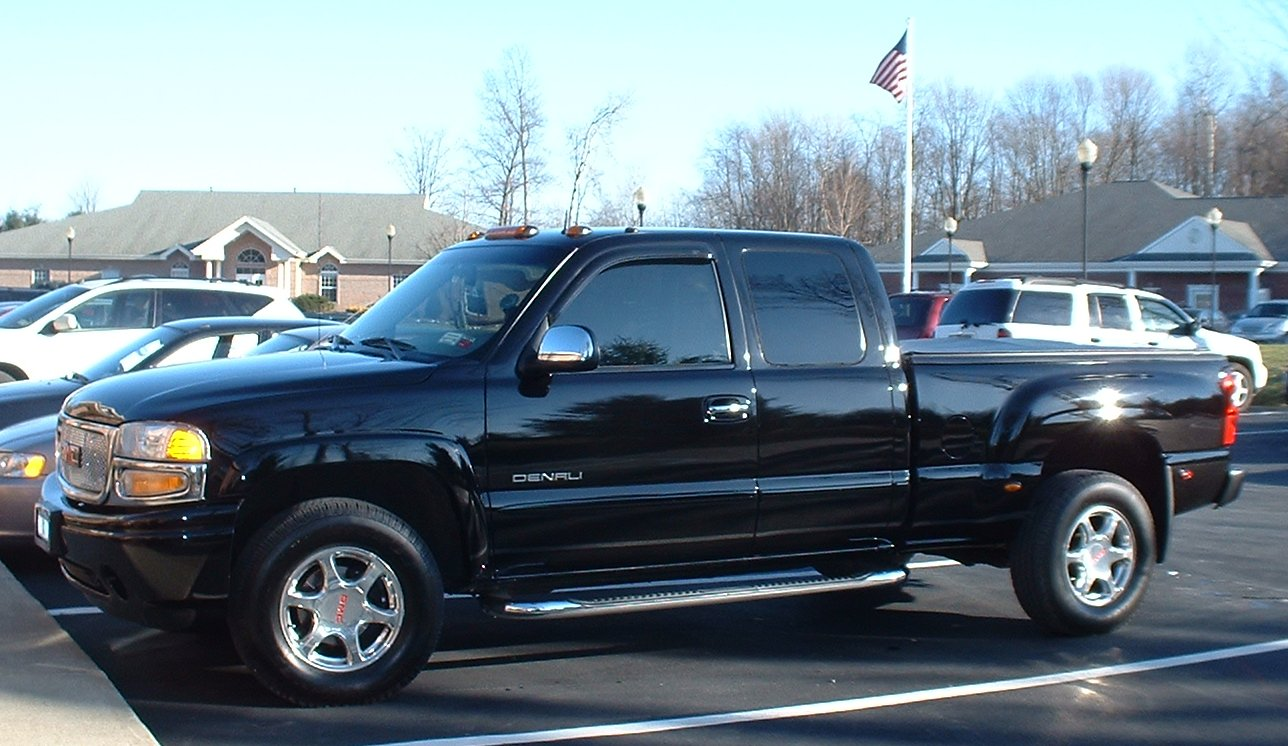
2002 GMC Sierra Denali with Quadrasteer

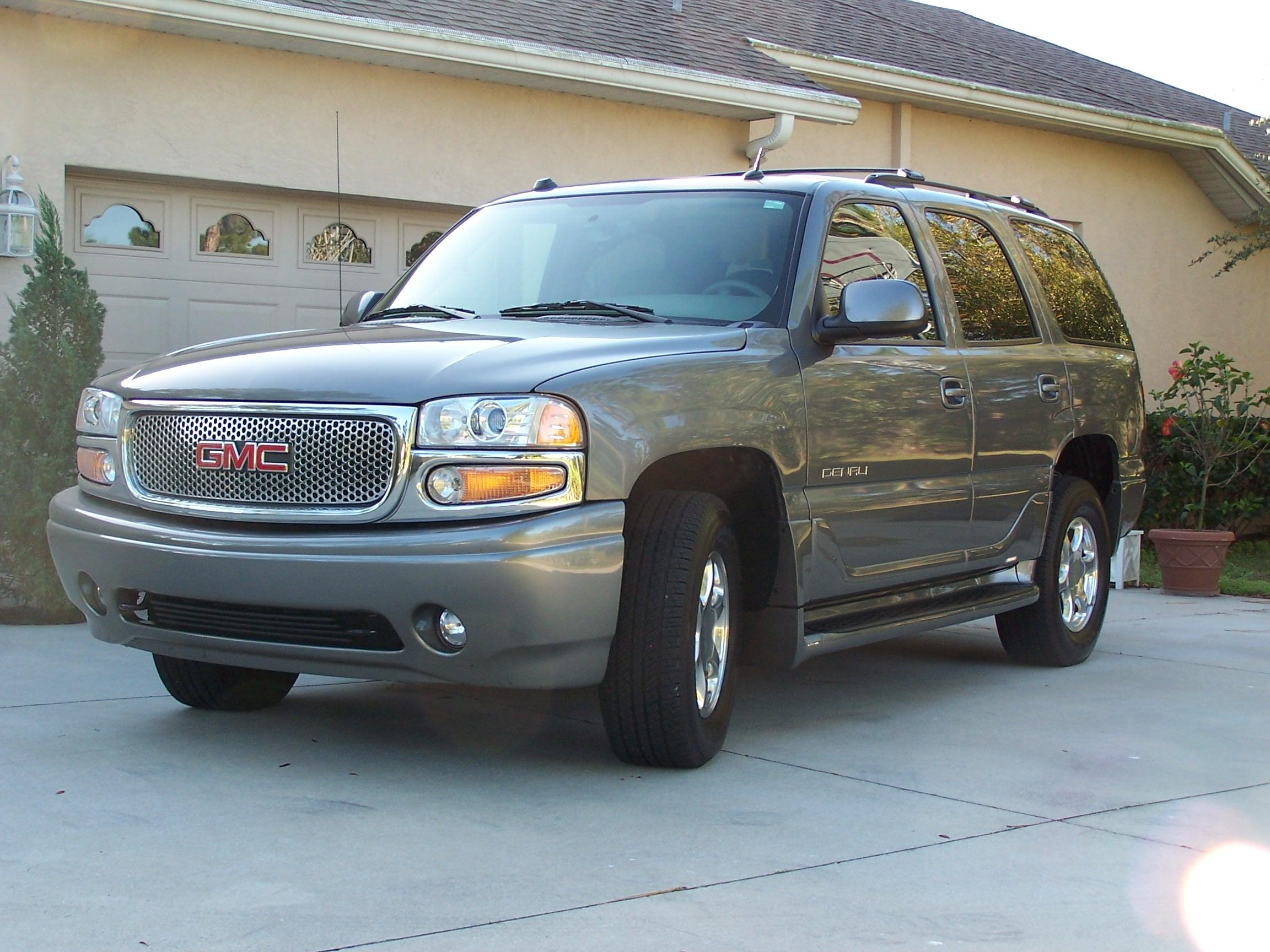
2005 GMC Yukon Denali

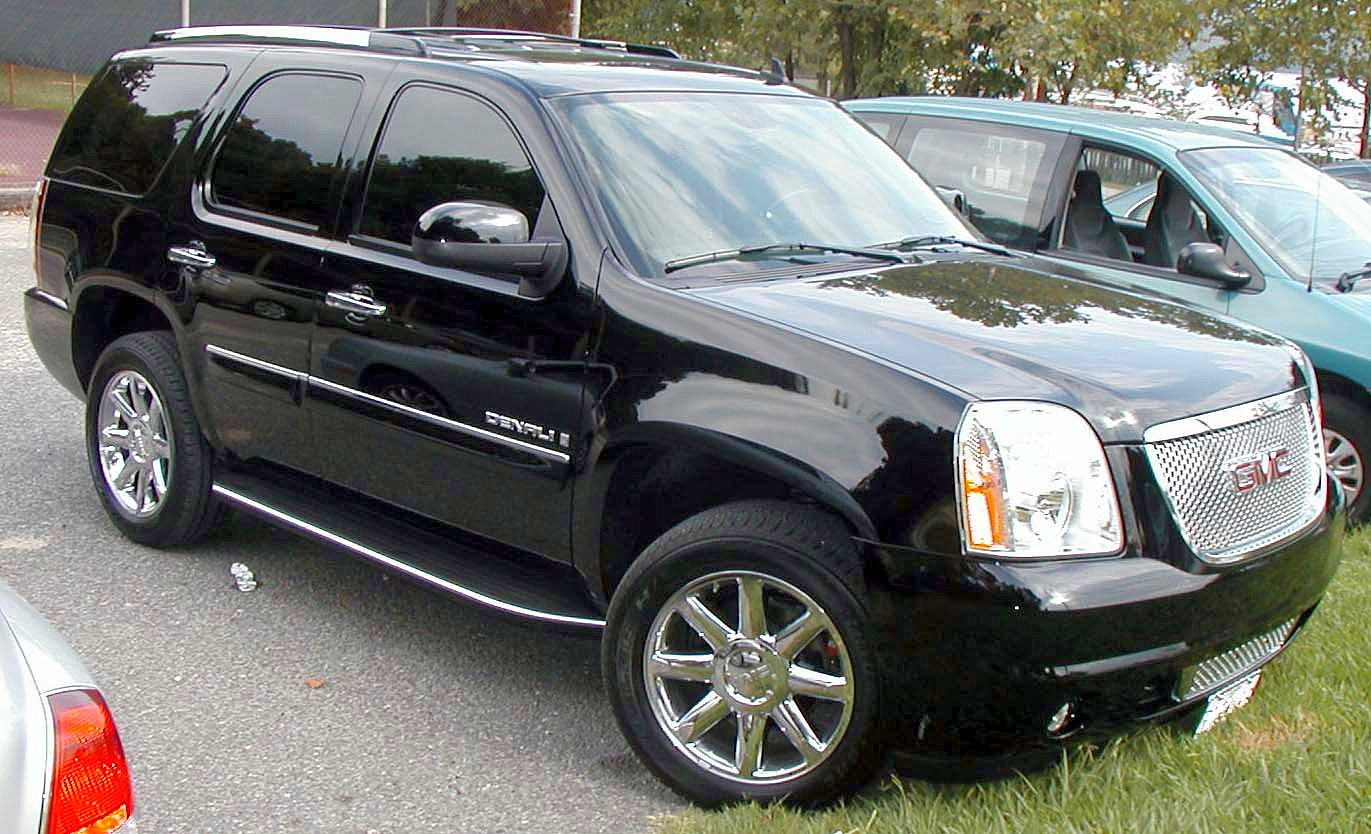
2007 GMC Yukon Denali

The Denali nameplate started as the top-of-the-line version of the GMC Yukon for the 1999 model year. It was also GM's first attempt to go after sales from the new-for-1998 Lincoln Navigator. General Motors decided to give Cadillac its own luxury SUV so the Denali's exterior was shared with the 1999 Cadillac Escalade, with only the front fascia and lower side body panels differing from the standard Yukon. Although the Yukon was redesigned alongside the Chevrolet Suburban and Chevrolet Tahoe in 2000, the Yukon Denali, Escalade, and Tahoe Limited/Z71 retained their GMT400 base design for one year longer.

The Denali brand is named after the tallest mountain in North America, Denali, which name comes from the native Alaskan Athabaskans / Koyukon people's name for that mountain.

== 1999–2000 ==
When introduced in 1999, the Yukon Denali's exterior, which it later shared with the 1999 Cadillac Escalade, differed from the standard Yukon in the front fascia and lower side body panels as well as having unique 16" polished aluminum wheels and a special exhaust cutout for a right side-exiting cast exhaust tip. The interior of the Denali also featured several upgrades not available on the mainstream Yukon. These standard features included an upgraded Nuance leather interior, driver and passenger 6-way power seats with power lumbar support, front and rear heated seats, a Bose 7 speaker (including subwoofer) audio system, an in-dash cassette, single CD player. Beginning in 2000 an in-console 6-disc CD changer was added and the continuous door buzzer was changed in favor of an actual chime that would later be used in the 2001-2002 Tahoe. Zebrano woodgrain accents decorated the front doors and center console. The front and rear doors featured unique "Yukon Denali" stitching in the panels. The unique cladding featured a Denali badge embossed in the lower cladding on the front doors.

The 350 cubic inch 5.7-litre 255 horsepower (L31) V8 was the only engine offered. RPO ZM9 was standard which included Bilstein 46mm shock absorbers and 3.73 front and rear axle ratios as well as a locking rear differential. Separate coolers for the transmission and engine oil were also standard. The Denali upgrade also included GM's automatic transfer case which allowed for push button transitions from 2-wheel high to 4-wheel high to 4 wheel low or fully automatic switching from 2 wheel drive to 4 wheel drive.

== 2001–2006 ==
It was not until 2001 that the Denali was redesigned based on the GMT800 platform. At the same time, GMC also introduced the extended-length Yukon XL Denali. All 2001-2006 Yukon and Yukon XL Denali models were built at the Janesville Assembly Plant. Embossed side body panels and chrome surrounding the headlights differentiate the Yukon Denali from the regular Yukon. 2001 also saw the introduction of the honeycomb pattern grille which now has become the hallmark of the Denali nameplate. 2001 saw the introduction of the 6.0L V8 application in the standard-size Yukon in the Denali trim for $45,000.00 which it also shared with the Cadillac Escalade. The engine produced 320 hp upon its introduction, then was upgraded to 325 hp in 2003. 2001 also introduced a new upgraded interior and new options such as 20-inch wheels.

The previous (for 2001 only) C3 model of the GMC Sierra trucks were renamed Denali in late 2001 as a 2002 model. The 2002–2004 Sierra Denali was equipped standard with a 325 hp 6.0 L V8, all-wheel-drive, and Quadrasteer, the 4-wheel steering system developed by General Motors. No 5.3 L V8 option was offered (until the 2014 model year with the K2XX platform).

For 2005 to 2007, "Classic body style" Sierra Denalis were equipped with a 345 hp 6.0 L V8. Additionally the trucks from 2005 to 2007 (2007 being classic body style) were changed to a crew cab with a 5'8" bed and did not have Quadrasteer as the 2001-2004 Sierra Denalis had.

== 2007 ==
In 2007, the GMC Yukon and Sierra lines were completely revamped with the Denali included, now with a 6.2L V8 (producing 380 HP / 417 lb/ft) in the Yukon Denali and (producing 403 HP / 417 lb/ft) in the Sierra Denali), six-speed automatic transmissions, and many new features and options such as power folding second row seats and rear backup camera. Styling was also changed, particularly the controversial grill and headlights, which made the Yukon look much less aggressive than any previous models. The MSRP's of the 2007 models were not increased.

== 2008 ==
In 2008, there were few small changes such as the gauge cluster on Sierra Denali. 2008 was the last year Janesville Assembly Plant built all Yukon / Yukon XL Denali before production was sent to Arlington Assembly during the 2009 model year.

== GMC Denali XT concept (2008) ==
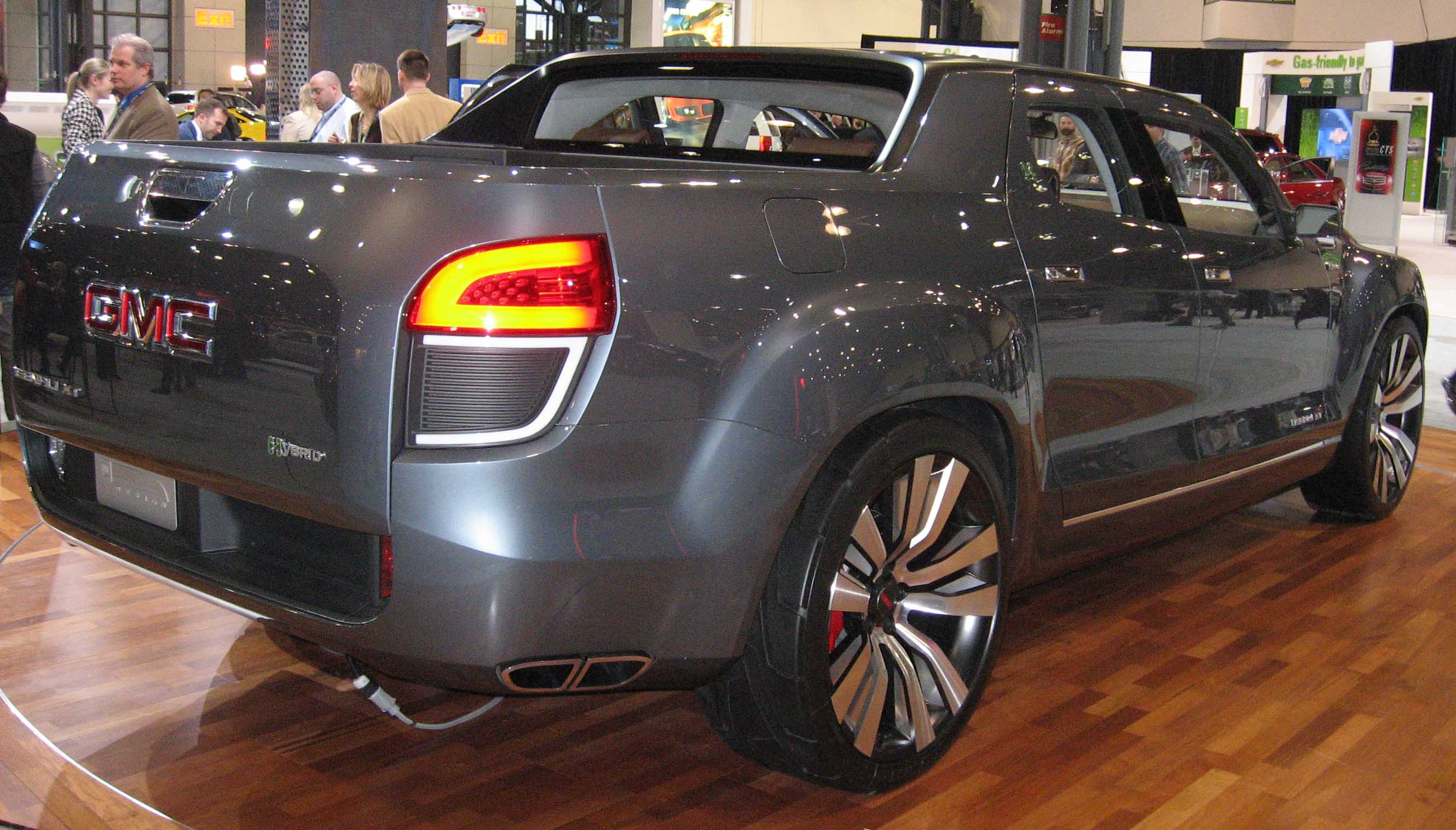
GMC Denali XT concept photographed at the 2008 New York Auto Show.

Unveiled at the 2008 Chicago Auto Show, the GMC Denali XT was a concept hybrid pickup truck with unibody design using Zeta platform. It had a 4.9 L V8 with Active Fuel Management engine rated at 326 horsepower (243 kW) with E85 ethanol-capability and direct-injection, two-mode hybrid propulsion system, 23-inch aluminum wheels with Kumho 255/35/R23 front and 285/35/R23 rear tires, height-adjustable suspension, 1,100 pounds (500 kg) payload and 3,500 pounds (1,600 kg) towing capacities. The vehicle was designed by GM's Australian design studios.

Although General Motors planned for a production version based on Epsilon II platform, it was reported the company cancelled the plan because the unibody design would not give much of an efficiency boost while losing capability for which buyers were willing to pay a premium.

== 2009 ==
In 2009, minor changes were made to the Yukon Denali. These changes include 403HP instead of 380HP, Cooled and perforated leather seats (optional), Bluetooth Handsfree calling standard, and flat chrome insert/body colored bodyside moldings. Also a power tilt steering wheel is now standard. The Satellite Navigation System (optional) now has the added features of instant traffic updates, and re-routing options. Side Zone Blind Spot Alert is now optional.

== 2010 ==
The GMC Acadia and GMC Sierra HD were added to the Denali lineup as 2011 models.

== 2012 ==
The GMC Terrain was added to the Denali lineup as a 2013 model.

== 2014–present ==
GMC unveiled its next generation Denalis, beginning with a newly redesigned Sierra pickup for the 2014 model year in 2013, followed by the launching of the 2015 Yukon and Yukon XL SUVs in February 2014.

The GMC Canyon was added to the Denali lineup as a 2017 model.

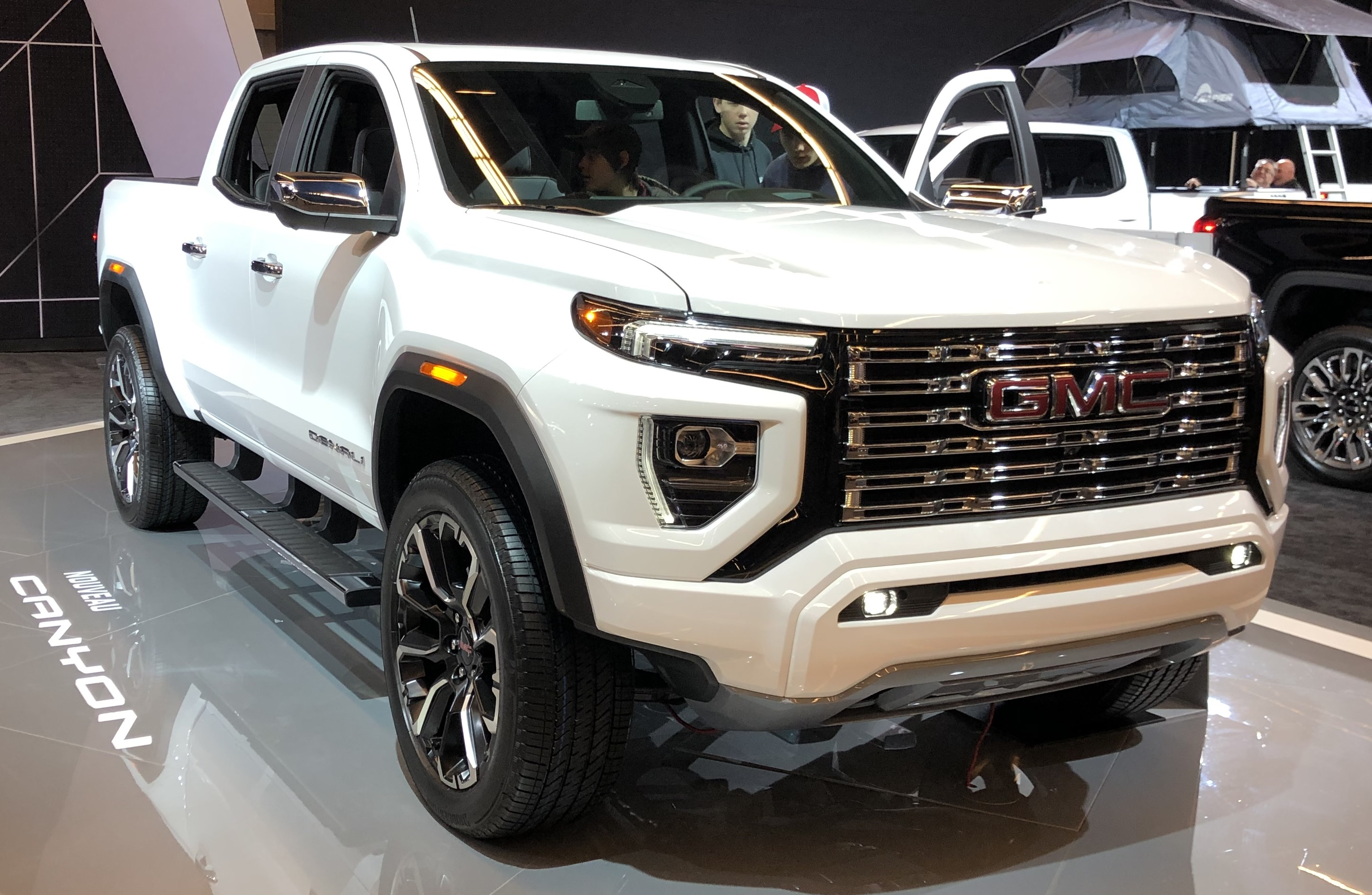
2023 GMC Canyon Denali

== Models ==
Model	Type	Model years offered
Yukon Denali	Full-size SUV	1999–present
Yukon XL Denali	Full-size SUV	2001–present
Sierra Denali	Full-size pickup truck	2002–present
Envoy Denali	Mid-size SUV	2005–2009
Envoy XL Denali	Mid-size SUV	2005-2006
Yukon Denali Hybrid	Full-size SUV	2009–2012
Acadia Denali	Full-size (later mid-size) crossover SUV	2011–present
Sierra Denali HD	Heavy-duty pickup truck	2011–present
Terrain Denali	Mid-size (later compact) crossover SUV	2013–present
Canyon Denali	Mid-size pickup truck	2017–present
