= Peugeot E-T16 =

Overview
- Manufacturer: Peugeot

Body and chassis
- Class: Concept car
- Body style: 3-door hatchback
- Platform: STLA One

The Peugeot E-T16 is a concept car developed by Peugeot. It was presented on 12 October 2026 in the 2026 Paris Motor Show.

== Overview ==
The E-T16 serves as a design study, previewing the next-generation Peugeot e-208. It is primarily a tribute to the Peugeot 205 T16 – a Group B rally car from the 1980s. Peugeot claims that the E-T16's features are "technically feasible" and can be produced as a low-volume, high-performance variant of the regular e-208.

=== Design ===
Together with the RCZ Vision, the E-T16 previews Peugeot's upcoming "Feline Future" design language. Design elements include "three claw" light signatures in the front and rear with triple light bars, illuminated Peugeot logo, as well as red pinstripes and accents. It also features extruded wheel arches, air intakes in the hood and front bumper, a diffuser with adjustable blades, and a "cat ear" rear wing. Its rear features a clamshell opening.

Rear view

Interior

=== Interior ===
The E-T16 features Renault's i-Cockpit cabin layout, consisting of a 21-inch panoramic display and a rounded rectangular steering wheel known as the "Hypersquare". It also has a vertically mounted hydraulic handbrake.

== Equipment and specifications ==
The E-T16 rides on Stellantis' upcoming 800-volt STLA One platform. It uses a triple-motor configuration consisting of one front-mounted unit and two rear-mounted ones, producing a combined 805 hp (600 kW; 816 PS). It can accelerate from 0-100 km/h (62 mph) in 2.5 seconds and from 0-300 km/h (190 mph) in 16 seconds.

It features a 85 kWh battery which provides up to 248 mi (399 km) of WLTP range, and can complete a charge from 10% to 80% in less than 15 minutes using a 350 kWh DC fast charger. The battery's cooling system use lateral cooling and are positioned in the side walls instead of the base, providing more efficient cooling at high temperatures. According to Peugeot, this technology allows it to complete three consecutive laps of the Nürburgring without power restrictions.

It features four brakes with a 380 mm (15 in) diameter in all four wheels. Furthermore, it uses Michelin tyres with a width of 275 mm (10.8 in) and 315 mm (12.4 in) in the front and rear respectively. It incorporates steer-by-wire technology through the Hypersquare steering wheel, featuring a variable steering ratio and allowing a full lock-to-lock turn in 170 degrees.
