= Steering =

Control of the direction of motion of vehicles and other objects

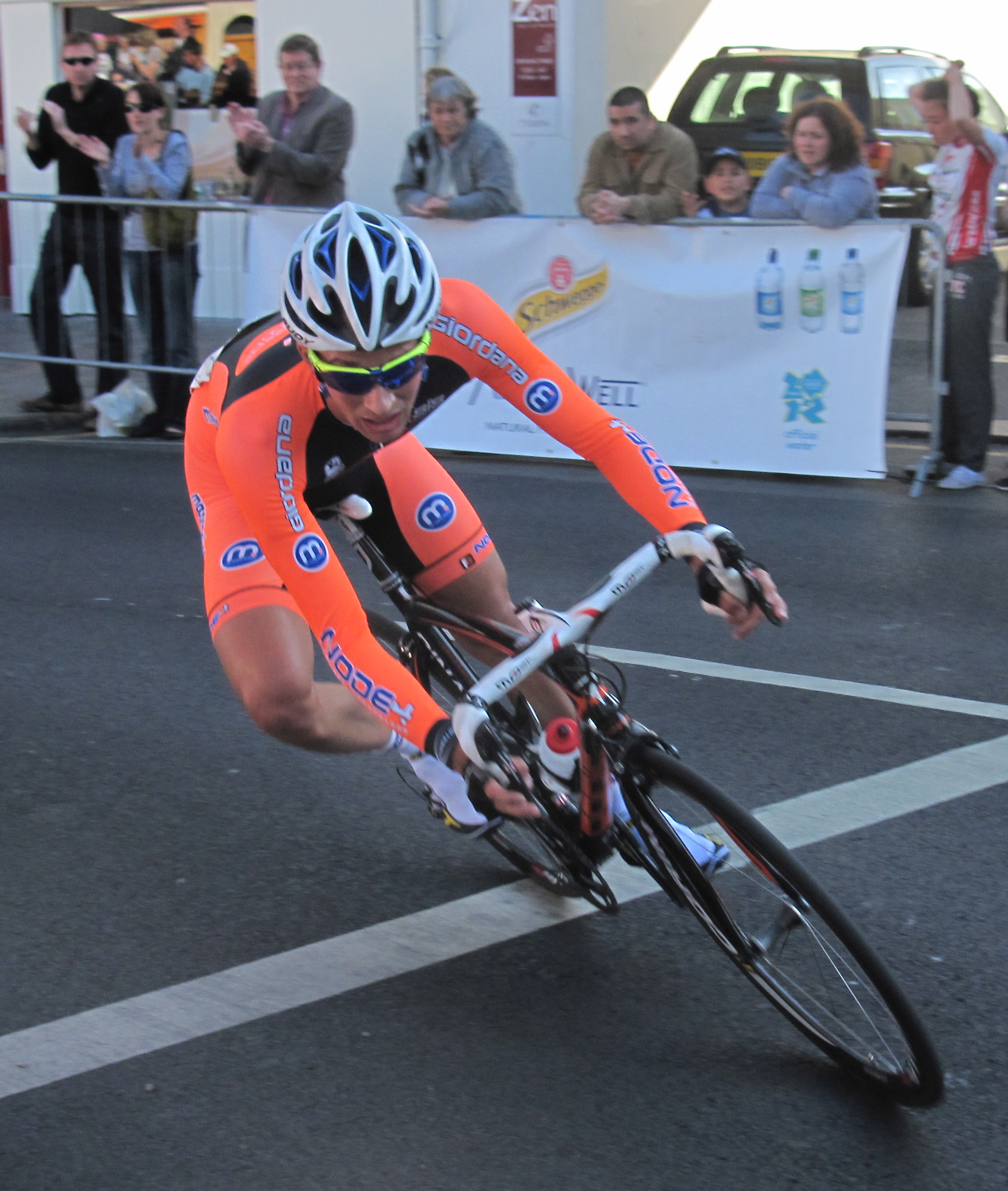
A cyclist steering a bicycle by turning the handlebar and leaning

Steering is the control of the direction of motion or the components that enable its control. Steering is achieved through various arrangements, among them ailerons for airplanes, rudders for boats, cylic tilting of rotors for helicopters, and many more.

== Aircraft ==
Aircraft flight control systems are normally steered when airborne by the use of ailerons, spoileron, or both to bank the aircraft into a turn; although the rudder can also be used to turn the aircraft, it is usually used to minimize adverse yaw, rather than as a means to directly cause the turn. On the ground, aircraft are generally steered at low speeds by turning the nosewheel or tailwheel (using a tiller or the rudder pedals) or through differential braking, and by the rudder at high speeds. Missiles, airships and large hovercraft are usually steered by a rudder, thrust vectoring, or both. Small sport hovercraft have similar rudders, but steer mostly by the pilot shifting their weight from side to side and unbalancing the more powerful lift forces beneath the skirt. Jet packs and flying platforms are steered by thrust vectoring only.

Helicopter flight controls are steered by cyclic control, changing the thrust vector of the main rotor(s), and by anti-torque control, often provided by a tail rotor.

== Automotive ==
Basic Components of a manual rack and pinion Automotive Steering System.

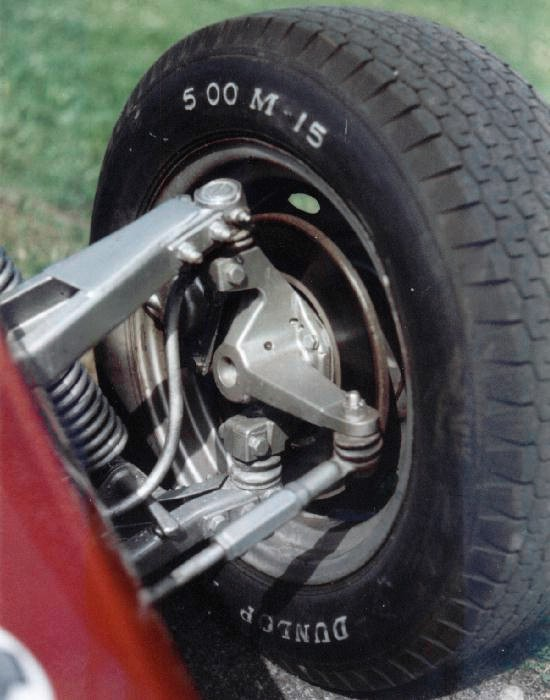
Part of a car steering mechanism: tie rod, steering arm, king pin axis (using ball joints)

A conventional automotive steering arrangement allows a driver to control the direction of the vehicle by turning the direction of the front wheels using a hand–operated steering wheel positioned in front of the driver. The steering wheel is attached to a steering column, which is linked to rods, pivots and gears that allow the driver to change the direction of the front wheels. The mechanism may include a rack and pinion mechanism that converts several turns of the steering wheel into a large linear displacement. Alternatively, it may use a recirculating ball system. The mechanism may be power-assisted, usually by hydraulic or electrical means.

The use of a variable rack (still using a normal pinion) was invented by Arthur Ernest Bishop in the 1970s, so as to improve vehicle response and aim to allow for more comfortable steering, especially at high speeds. He also created a low cost press forging process to manufacture the racks, eliminating the need to machine the gear teeth.

Other arrangements are sometimes found on different types of vehicles; for example, a tiller or rear-wheel steering. Tracked vehicles such as bulldozers and tanks usually employ differential steering, where the tracks are made to move at different speeds or in opposite directions, using the clutch and brakes, to achieve a change of direction.

Common steering system components include:

- Steering wheel
- Steering column
- Steering box
- Pitman arm
- Idler arm
- Tie rod ends
- Rack and pinion
- Power steering pump
- Power steering fluid
- Steering linkage
- Steering knuckle
- Ball joints
- Steering dampers

=== Geometry ===
Ackermann steering geometry

The basic aim of steering is to ensure that the wheels are pointing in the desired direction to move the vehicle as required. This is typically achieved by a series of linkages, rods, pivots, and gears. One of the fundamental concepts is that of caster angle. Each wheel is steered with a pivot point ahead of the wheel, which tends to make the steering self-centered in the direction of travel.

The steering linkages connecting the steering box and the wheels usually conform to a variation of Ackermann steering geometry, to account for the fact that in a turn, the inner wheel travels in a path of smaller radius than the outer wheel, so that the degree of toe suitable for driving in a straight path is not suitable for turns. The angle the wheels make in the vertical plane, known as camber angle, also influences steering dynamics as do the tires.

Caster angle θ indicates kingpin pivot line and gray area indicates vehicle's tire with the wheel moving from right to left. A positive caster angle aids in directional stability, as the wheel tends to trail, but a large angle makes steering more difficult.

Curves described by the rear wheels of a conventional automobile. While the vehicle moves with a constant speed its inner and outer rear wheels do not.

Steering wheel turning is often measured in terms of number of full 360-degree turns to go lock-to-lock. This is when the steering input mechanism is restrained at its mechanical limit from the full right-turn stop to the left-turn stop.

=== Rack and pinion, recirculating ball, worm and sector ===
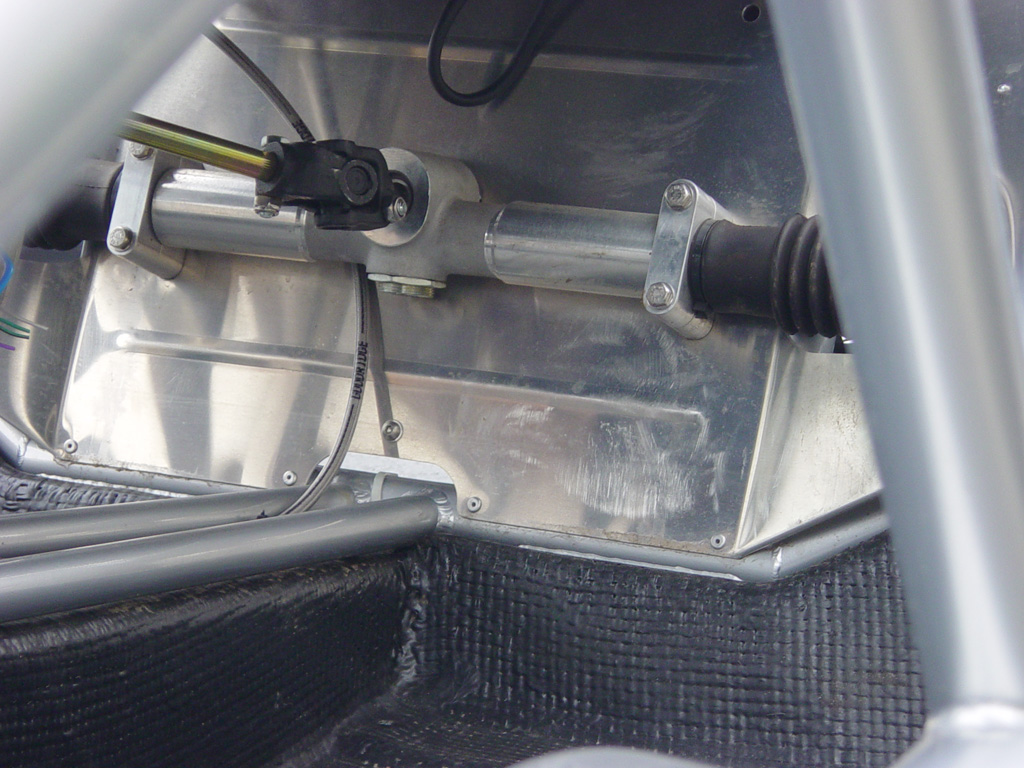
Rack and pinion unit mounted in the cockpit of an Ariel Atom sports car chassis, atypical of contemporary production automobiles

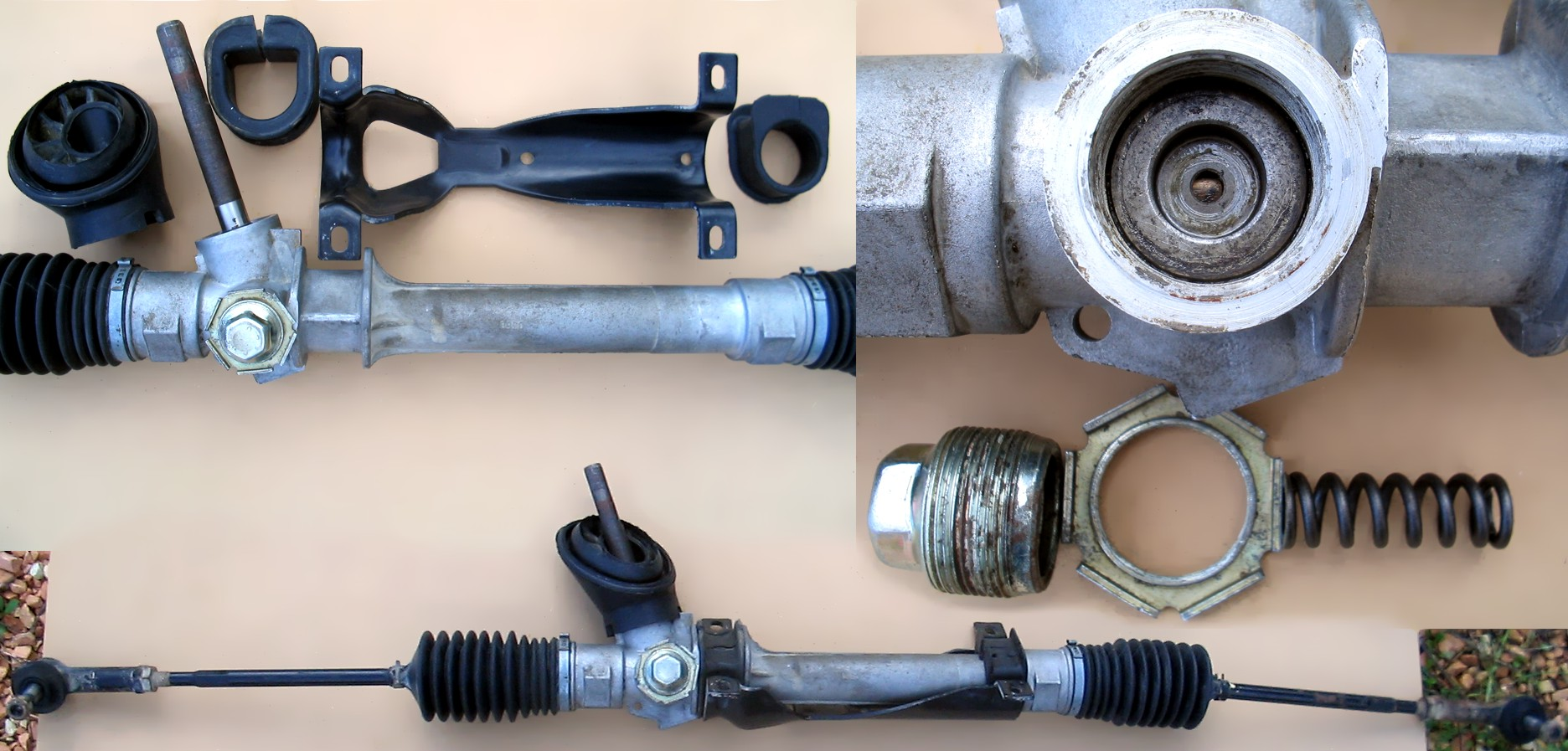
Non-assisted steering box of a motor vehicle

Many modern cars have a steering mechanism called a rack and pinion. The steering wheel turns a pinion gear, which moves a rack back and forth to steer the wheels. This mechanism converts the circular motion of the steering wheel to linear motion, which is applied to the wheels of the car via tie rods and a steering knuckle.

Rack and pinion steering has several advantages, such as a direct steering "feel". This means that the driver can feel the road better and have more precise control over the car's movement.

BMW was one of the first manufacturers to adopt rack and pinion steering systems in the 1930s, with many other European manufacturers following suit. Auto manufacturers in the United States began to use rack and pinion steering with the 1974 Ford Pinto.

Older designs use two main principles: the worm and sector design and the screw and nut. Both types were enhanced by reducing the friction; for screw and nut it is the recirculating ball mechanism, which is still found on trucks and utility vehicles. The steering column turns a large screw, which meshes with the nut by recirculating balls. The nut moves a sector of a gear, causing it to rotate about its axis as the screw is turned; an arm attached to the axis of the sector moves the pitman arm, which is connected to the steering linkage and thus steers the wheels. The recirculating ball version of this apparatus reduces the considerable friction by placing large ball bearings between the screw and the nut. At either end of the apparatus, the balls exit from between the two pieces into a channel internal to the box, which connects them with the other end of the apparatus. Thus, they are "recirculated".

The recirculating ball mechanism gives a driver a greater mechanical advantage, resulting in its use on larger, heavier vehicles, while the rack and pinion would originally be limited to smaller and lighter ones; due to the almost universal adoption of power steering, however, this is no longer considered an important advantage, leading to the increasing use of rack and pinion mechanisms on newer cars. The recirculating ball design also has a perceptible lash, or "dead spot" on center, where a minute turn of the steering wheel in either direction does not move the steering apparatus; this is easily adjustable via a screw on the end of the steering box to account for wear, but it cannot be eliminated because it will produce excessive internal forces at other positions and the mechanism will wear very rapidly. This design is still in use in trucks and other large vehicles, where rapidity of steering and direct feel are less important than robustness, maintainability, and mechanical advantage.

The worm and sector was an older design, used for example in Willys and Chrysler vehicles, and the Ford Falcon (1960s). To reduce friction, the sector is replaced by a roller or rotating pins on the rocker shaft arm.

Generally, older vehicles use the recirculating ball mechanism, and only newer vehicles use rack-and-pinion steering. This division is not very strict, however, and rack-and-pinion steering systems can be found on British sports cars of the mid-1950s, and some German carmakers did not give up recirculating ball technology until the early 1990s.

Other systems for steering exist, but are uncommon on road vehicles. Children's toys and go-karts often use a very direct linkage in the form of a bellcrank (also commonly known as a pitman arm) attached directly between the steering column and the steering arms, and the use of cable-operated steering linkages (e.g. the capstan and bowstring mechanism) is also found on some home-built vehicles such as soapbox cars and recumbent tricycles.

=== Power steering ===
Power steering helps the driver of a vehicle to steer by directing some of its engine power to assist in swiveling the steered road wheels about their steering axes. As vehicles have become heavier and switched to front-wheel drive, particularly using negative offset geometry, along with increases in tire width and diameter, the effort needed to turn the wheels about their steering axis has increased, often to the point where major physical exertion would be needed were it not for power assistance. To alleviate this, auto makers have developed power steering systems, or more correctly power-assisted steering, since on road-going vehicles there has to be a mechanical linkage as a fail-safe. There are two types of power steering systems: hydraulic and electric/electronic. A hydraulic-electric hybrid system is also possible.

A Hydraulic Power Steering (HPS) uses hydraulic pressure supplied by an engine-driven pump to assist the motion of turning the steering wheel. Electric Power Steering (EPS) is more efficient than hydraulic power-steering, since the electric power-steering motor only needs to provide assistance when the steering wheel is turned, whereas the hydraulic pump must run constantly. In EPS, the amount of assistance is easily tunable to the vehicle type, road speed, and driver preference. An added benefit is the elimination of the environmental hazard posed by leakage and disposal of hydraulic power-steering fluid. In addition, electrical assistance is not lost when the engine fails or stalls, whereas hydraulic assistance stops working if the engine stops, making the steering doubly heavy as the driver must now turn not only the very heavy steering—without any help—but also the power-assistance system itself.

=== Speed-sensitive steering ===
Speed-sensitive steering allows for highly assisted steering at low speeds for maneuverability, and lightly assisted steering at high speed for stability. The first vehicle with this feature was the Citroën SM with its DIRAVI system, first sold in France in 1970. The hydraulic steering system applied force on a centering cam which pushed the steering rack and wheel back to the straight-ahead position. The centering force increased with speed, requiring more effort to turn the wheel at greater speeds.

Modern speed-sensitive power steering systems reduce the mechanical or electrical assistance as the vehicle speed increases, giving a more direct feel. This feature is gradually becoming more common. For example, it was used on a production pickup truck, the Tesla Cybertruck, in 2023.

=== Four-wheel steering ===
Speed-dependent four-wheel steering.

Four-wheel steering is a system employed by some vehicles to improve steering response, increase vehicle stability while maneuvering at high speed, or to decrease turning radius at low speed.

==== Active four-wheel steering ====
In an active four-wheel steering system, all four wheels turn at the same time when the driver steers. In most active four-wheel steering systems, the rear wheels are steered by a computer and actuators. The rear wheels generally cannot turn as far as the front wheels. There can be controls to switch off the rear steering and options to steer only the rear wheels independently of the front wheels. At low speed (e.g. parking) the rear wheels turn opposite to the front wheels, reducing the turning radius, sometimes critical for large trucks, tractors, vehicles with trailers and passenger cars with a large wheelbase, while at higher speeds both front and rear wheels turn alike (electronically controlled), so that the vehicle may change lanes with less yaw and improved build-up of the lateral acceleration, enhancing straight-line stability.

Four-wheel steering is used in most monster trucks, where maneuverability in small arenas is critical, and it is also popular in large farm vehicles and trucks. Some of the modern European Intercity buses also utilize four-wheel steering to assist maneuverability in bus terminals, and also to improve road stability. It was first implemented in the Bollée-Dalifol steam tram of 1876, which could come off the rails and move around independently. Mazda were pioneers in applying four-wheel steering to automobiles, showing it on their 1984 Mazda MX-02 concept car, where the rear wheels counter-steered at low speeds. Mazda proceeded to offer a version of this electronic four-wheel steering system on the Mazda 626 and MX6 in 1988. The first rally vehicle to use the technology was the Peugeot 405 Turbo 16, which debuted at the 1988 Pikes Peak International Hill Climb.

Previously, Honda had mechanical four-wheel steering as an option in their 1987–2001 Prelude and Honda Ascot models (1989–1996) later upgrading to electronically controlled. General Motors offered Delphi's Quadrasteer in their Silverado/Sierra and Suburban/Yukon. Due to initially high cost as an option and lack of familiarity producing low demand, GM discontinued the technology at the end of the 2005 model year. Nissan/Infiniti offer several versions of their HICAS system as standard or as an option in much of their line-up.

In the early 2000s, a new generation of four-wheel steering systems was introduced into the market. In 2001 BMW equipped the E65 7 series with an all-wheel steering system (optional, called 'Integral Active Steering'), which is available on the current 5, 6, and 7 series, as an option. Renault introduced an optional all-wheel steering called '4control' in 2009, at first on the Laguna GT, which is currently available on the Talisman, Mégane and Espace vehicle lines. In 2013, Porsche introduced a system on the 911 Turbo as standard equipment. Since 2016, the Panamera has been offered with optional all-wheel steering. The 2014 Audi Q7 was launched with an optional system. Also the Japanese OEMs offer luxury segment vehicles equipped with all-wheel steering, such as Infiniti on its QX70 model ('Rear Active Steering') and Lexus on the GS. Italian manufacturers have launched the technology in the model years 2016–17 with the Ferrari F12tdf, the Ferrari GTC4Lusso as well as the Lamborghini Aventador S.

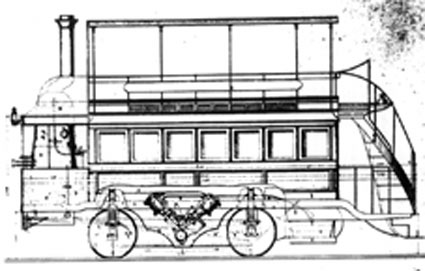
Bollée-Dalifol steam tram of 1876 with four-wheel drive and four-wheel steering

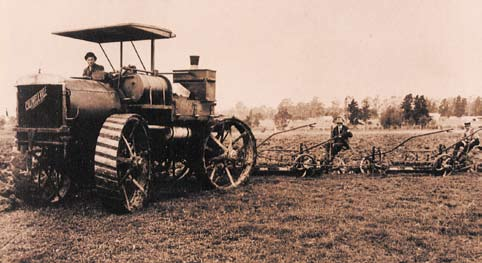
Early example of four-wheel steering. 1910 photograph of 80 hp Caldwell Vale tractor in action.

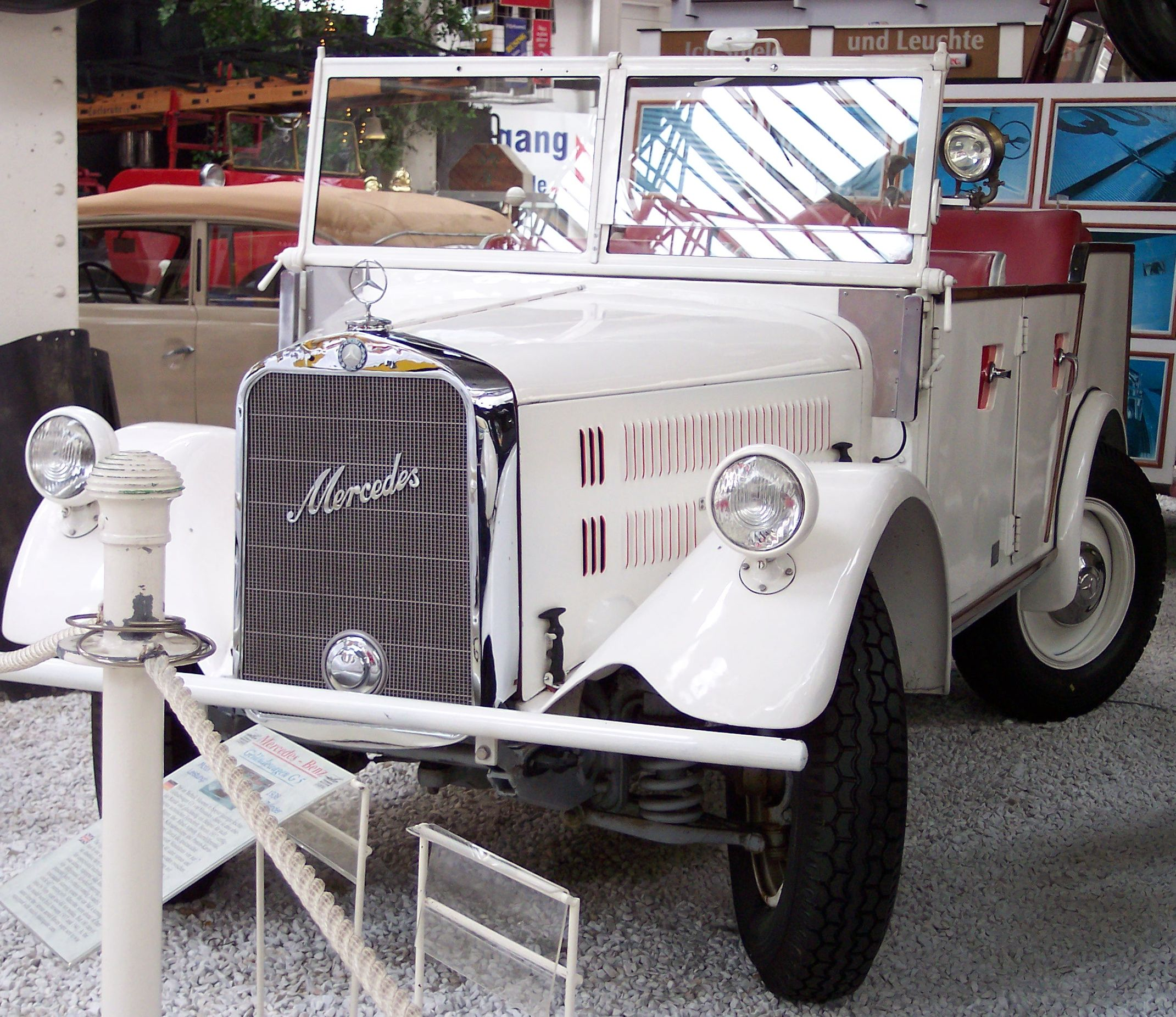
1937 Mercedes-Benz Type G 5 with four-wheel steering.

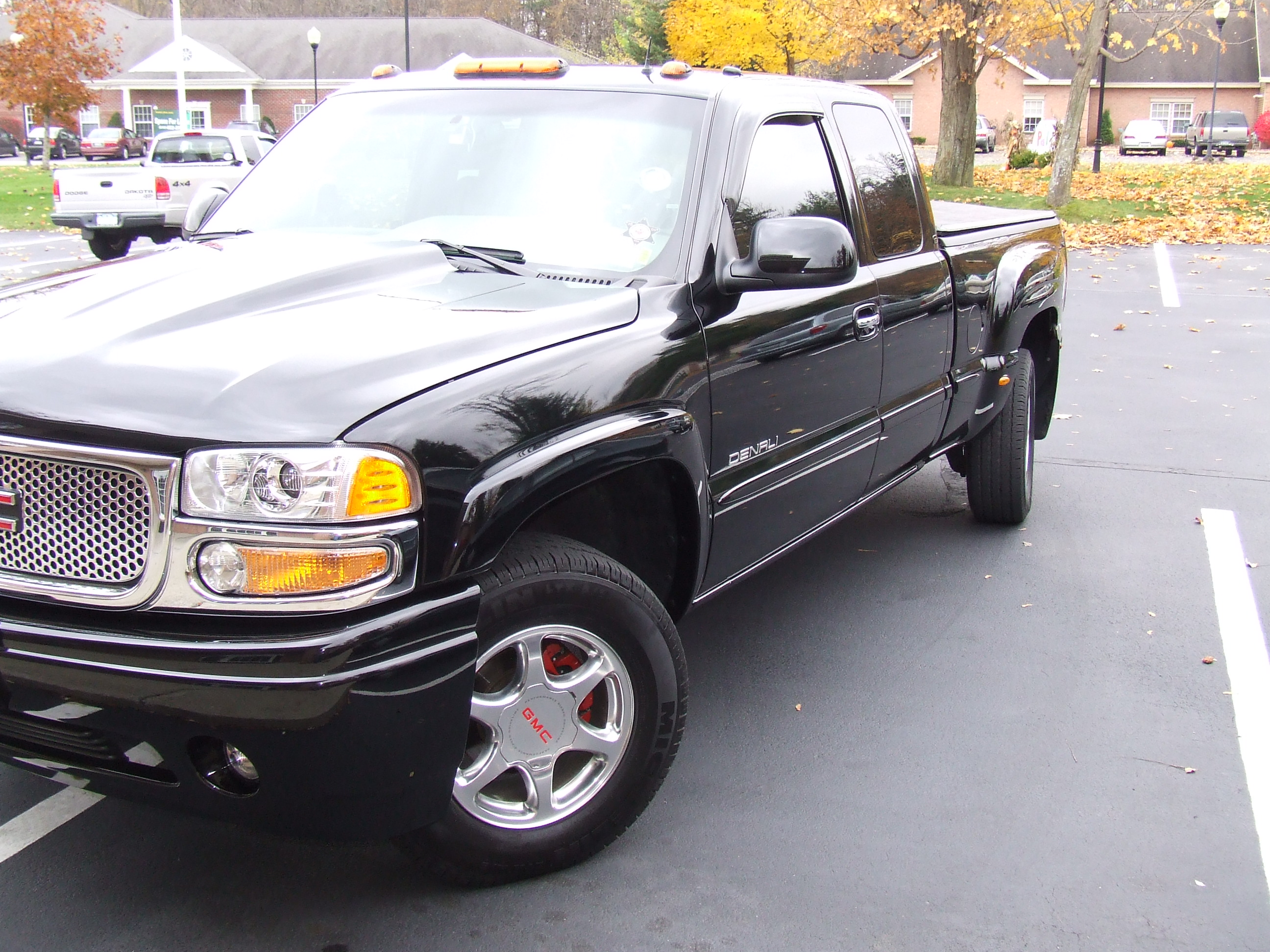
Sierra Denali with Quadrasteer, rear steering angle.

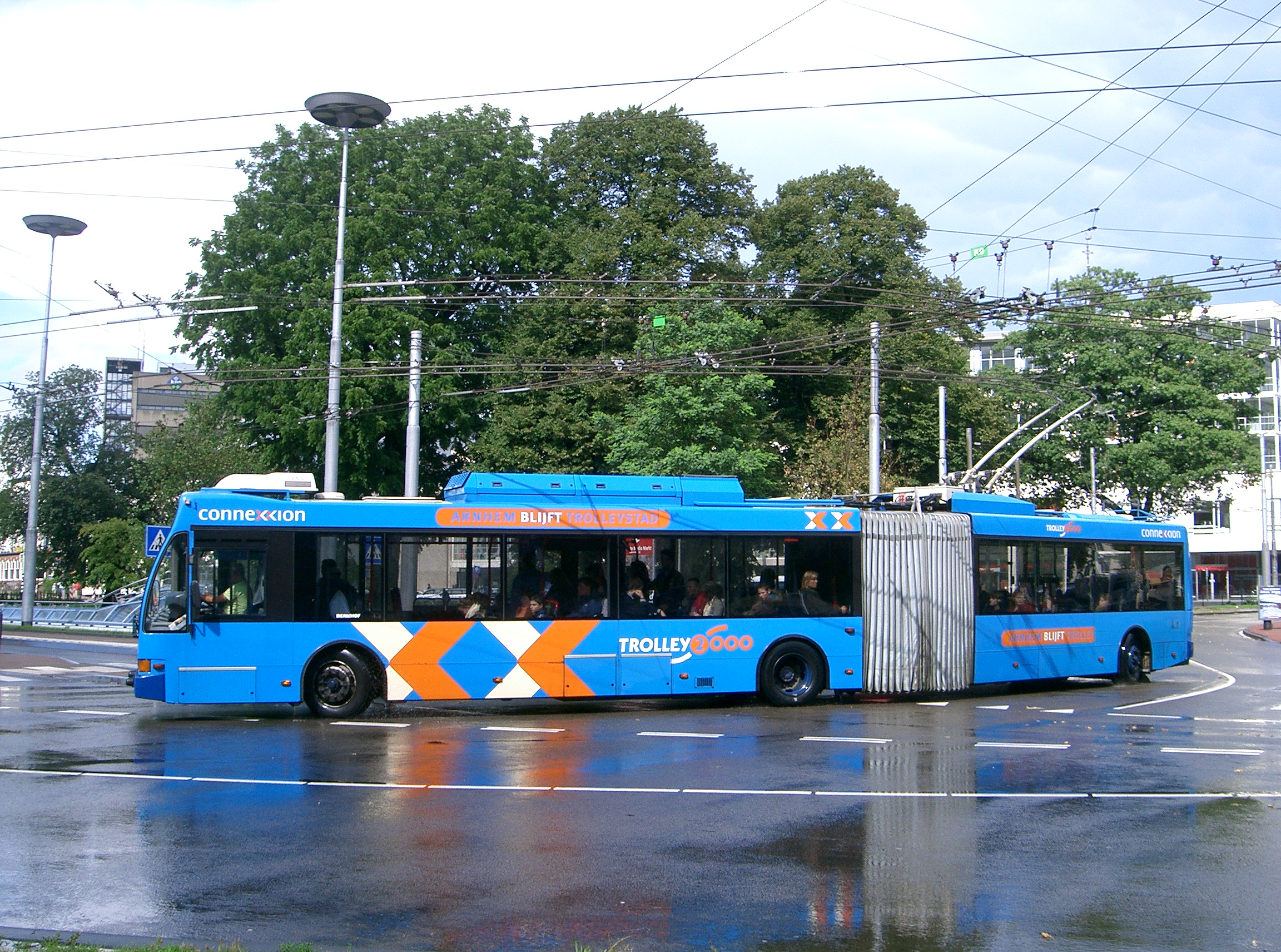
Articulated Arnhem trolleybus demonstrating its four-wheel steering on front and rear axles (2006).

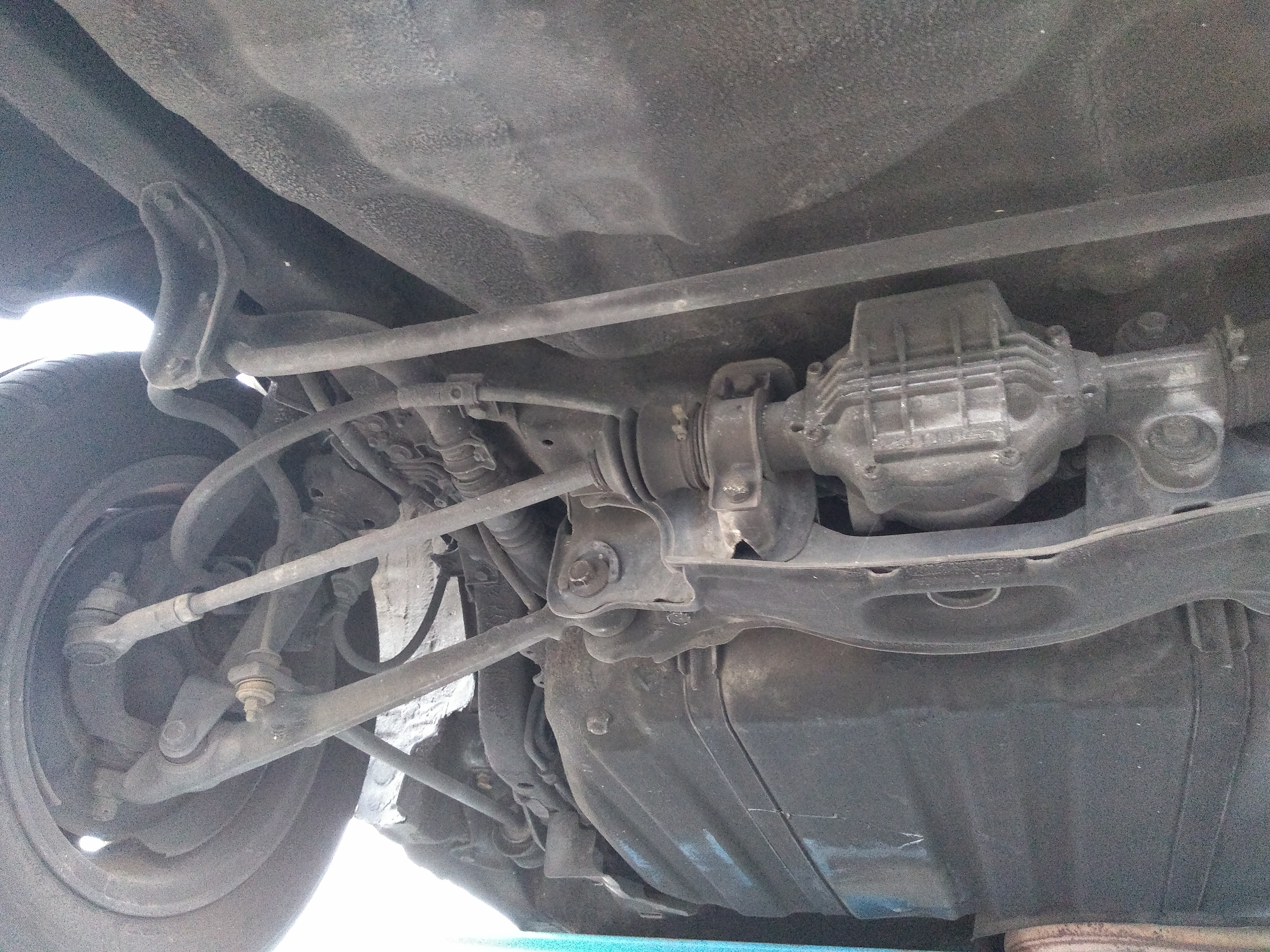
Honda Prelude Mk III rear steering box

===== Crab steering =====
Crab steering is a special type of active four-wheel steering. It operates by steering all wheels in the same direction and at the same angle. Crab steering is used when the vehicle needs to proceed in a straight line but at an angle: when changing lanes on a highway at speed, when moving loads with a reach truck, or during filming with a camera dolly.

Rear wheel steering can also be used when the rear wheels may not follow the path taken by the front wheel tracks (e.g. to reduce soil compaction when using rolling farm equipment).

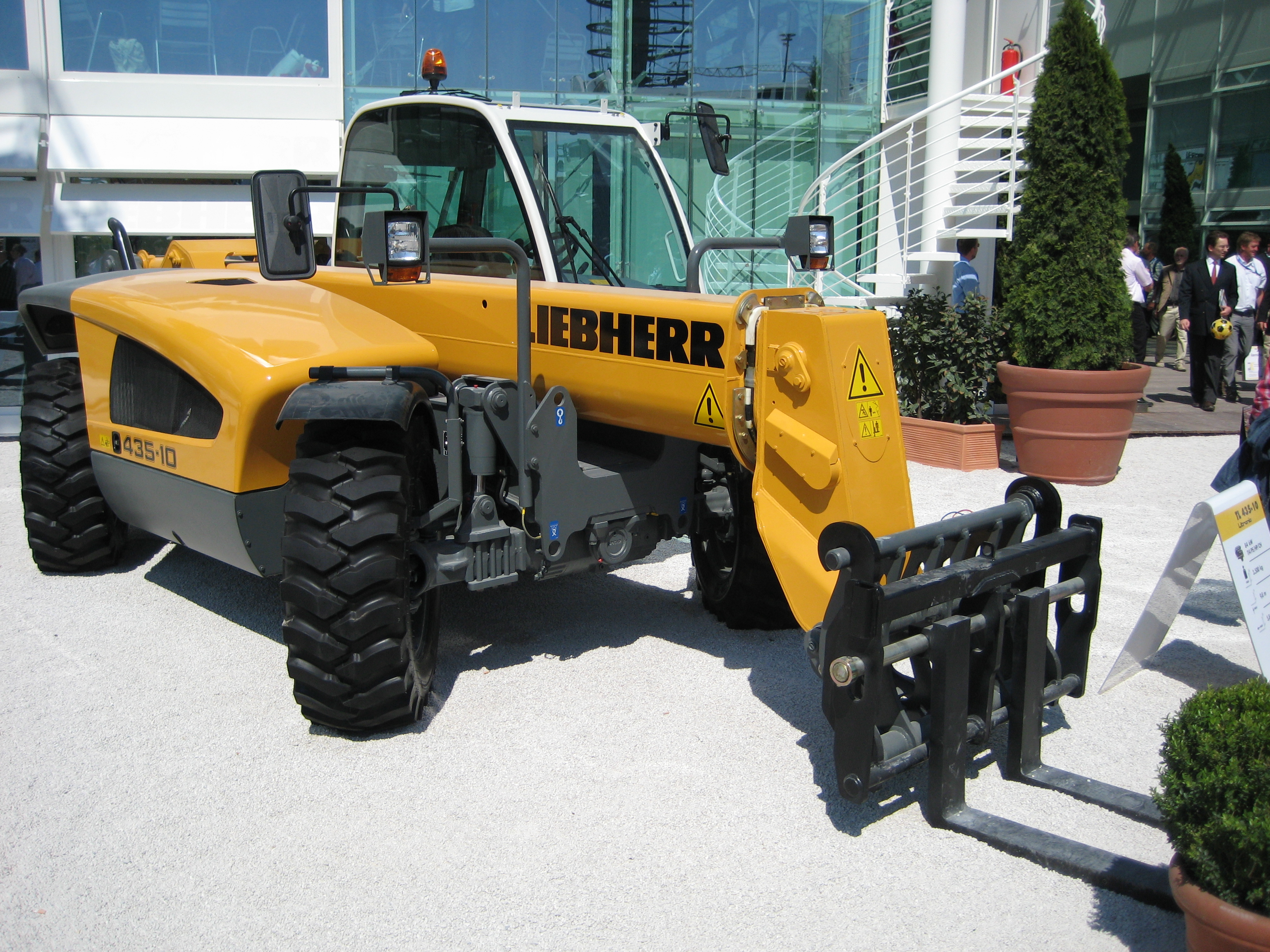
2007 Liebherr-Bauma telescopic handler using crab steering.

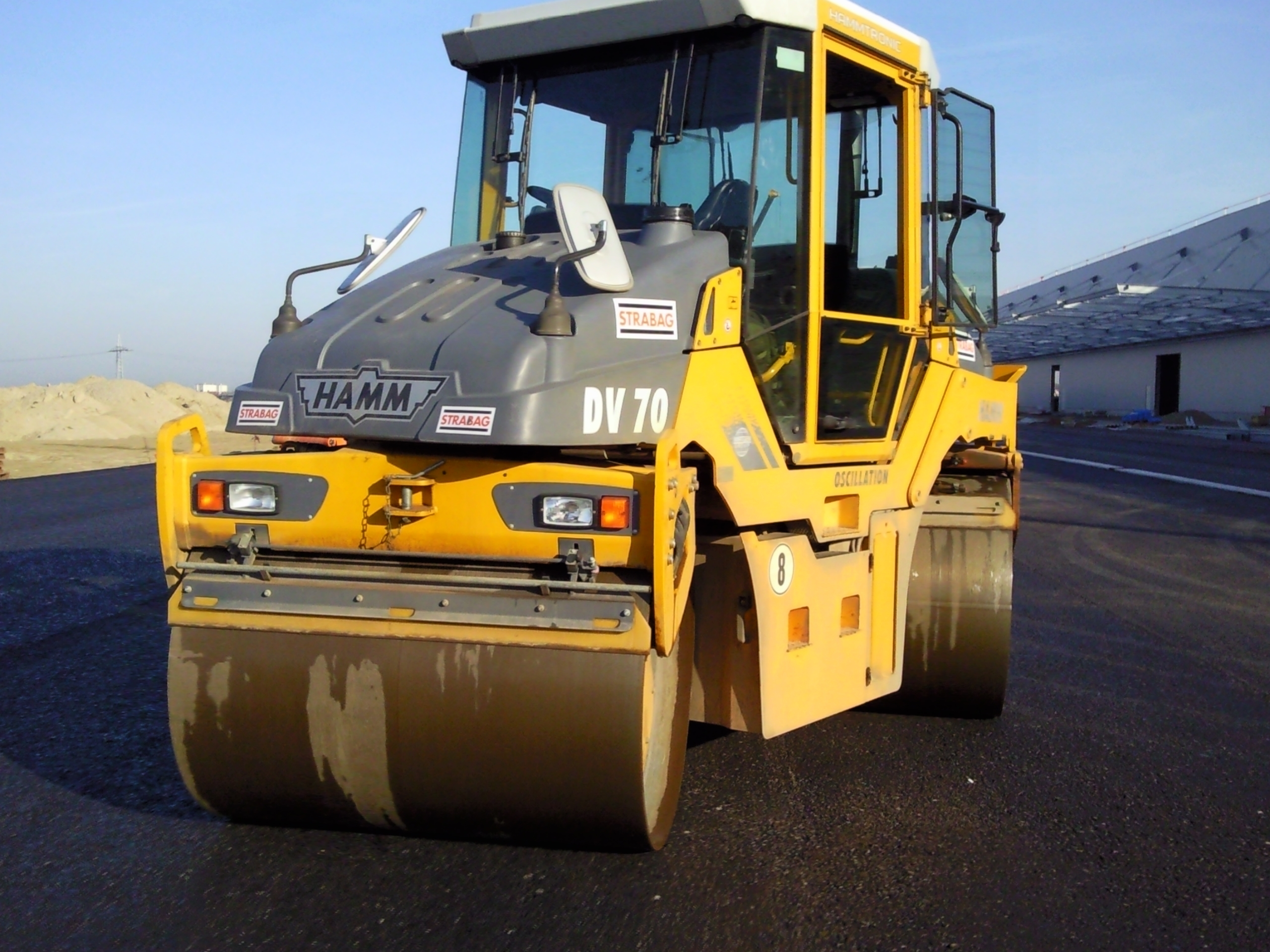
Hamm DV70 tandem roller using crab steering to cover maximum road surface (2010).

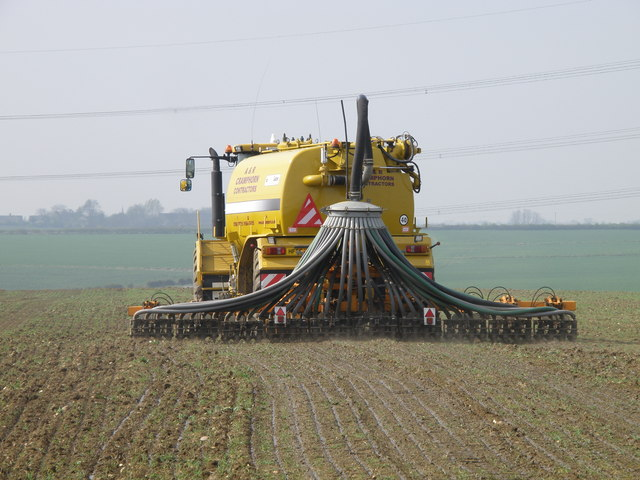
Agricultural slurry applicator using crab steering to minimise soil compaction (2009).

==== Passive rear-wheel steering ====
Many modern vehicles have passive rear-wheel steering. On many vehicles, when cornering, the rear wheels tend to steer slightly to the outside of a turn, which can reduce stability. The passive steering system uses the lateral forces generated in a turn (through suspension geometry) and the bushings to correct this tendency and steer the wheels slightly to the inside of the corner. This improves the stability of the car through the turn. This effect is called compliance understeer; it, or its opposite, is present on all suspensions. Typical methods of achieving compliance understeer are to use a Watt's link on a live rear axle, or the use of toe control bushings on a twist beam suspension. On an independent rear suspension it is normally achieved by changing the rates of the rubber bushings in the suspension. Some suspensions typically have compliance oversteer due to geometry, such as Hotchkiss live axles, semi-trailing arm IRS, and rear twist beams, but may be mitigated by revisions to the pivot points of the leaf spring or trailing arm, or additional suspension links, or complex internal geometry of the bushings.

Passive rear-wheel steering is not a new concept, as it has been in use for many years, although not always recognized as such.

=== Articulated steering ===
Articulated steering on a bandvagn 206.

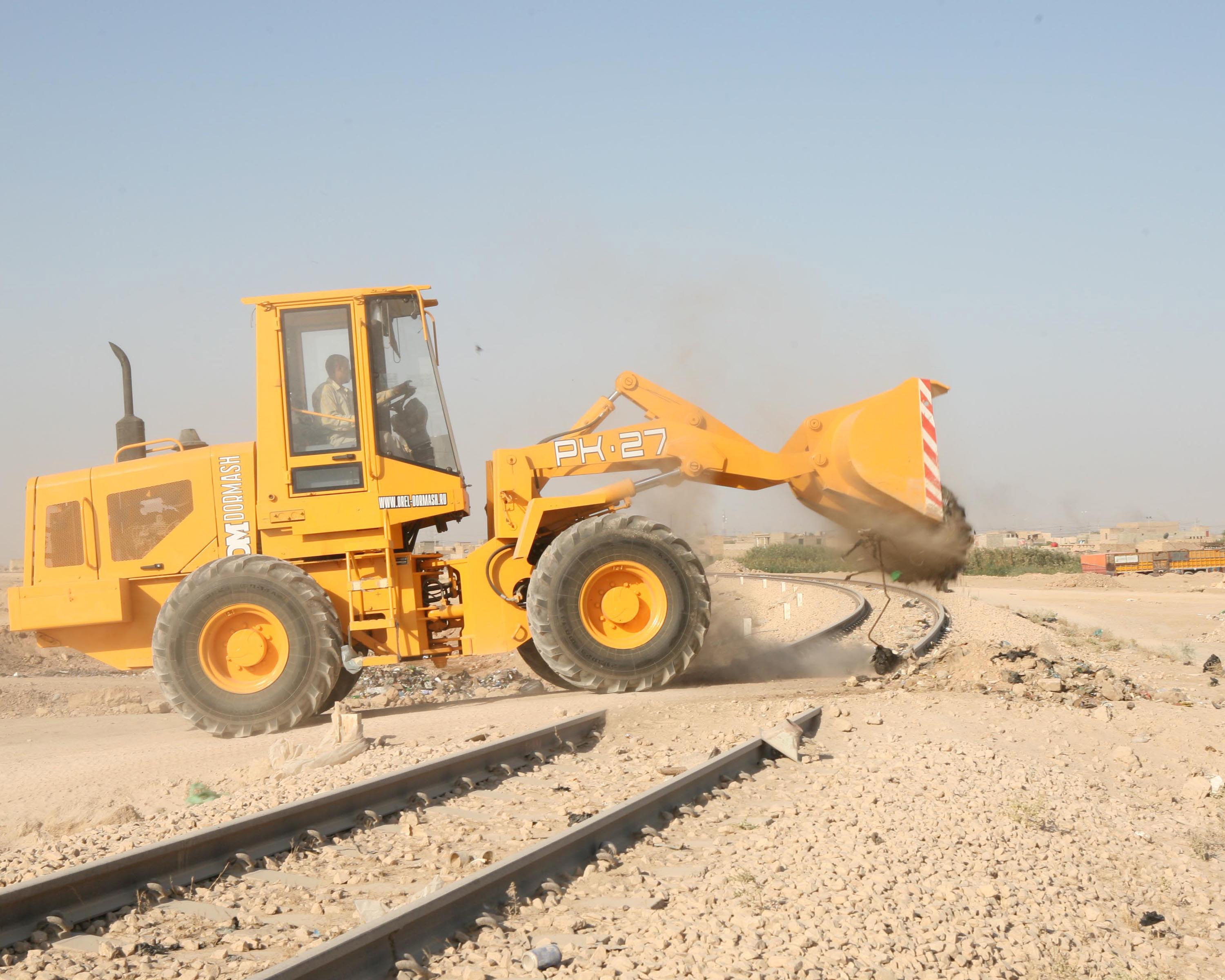
Front loader with articulated steering (2007).

Articulated steering is a system by which a vehicle is split into front and rear halves which are connected by a vertical hinge. The front and rear halves are connected with one or more hydraulic cylinders that change the angle between the halves, including the front and rear axles and wheels, thus steering the vehicle. This system does not use steering arms, king pins, tie rods, etc. as does four-wheel steering. If the vertical hinge is placed equidistant between the two axles, it also eliminates the need for a central differential in four-wheel drive vehicles, as both front and rear axles will follow the same path, and thus rotate at the same speed. Articulated haulers have very good off-road performance.

Vehicle-trailer-combinations such as semi-trailers, road trains, articulated buses, and internal transport trolley trains can be regarded as passively-articulated vehicles.

=== Rear-wheel steering ===
A few types of vehicle use only rear-wheel steering, notably fork lift trucks, camera dollies, early pay loaders, Buckminster Fuller's Dymaxion car, and the ThrustSSC.

Rear wheel steering is particularly useful for tight maneuvring. However naive implementations of rear-wheel steering tend to oversteer which may lead to steering instability. Therefore rear-wheel steering usually only found in slower vehicles that need high-maneuverability in tight spaces, e.g. fork lifts.

For heavy haulage or for increased maneuverability, some semi-trailers are fitted with rear-wheel steering, controlled electro-hydraulically. The wheels on all or some of the rear axles may be turned through different angles to enable tighter cornering, or through the same angle (crab steering) to move the rear of the trailer laterally.

=== Steer-by-wire ===
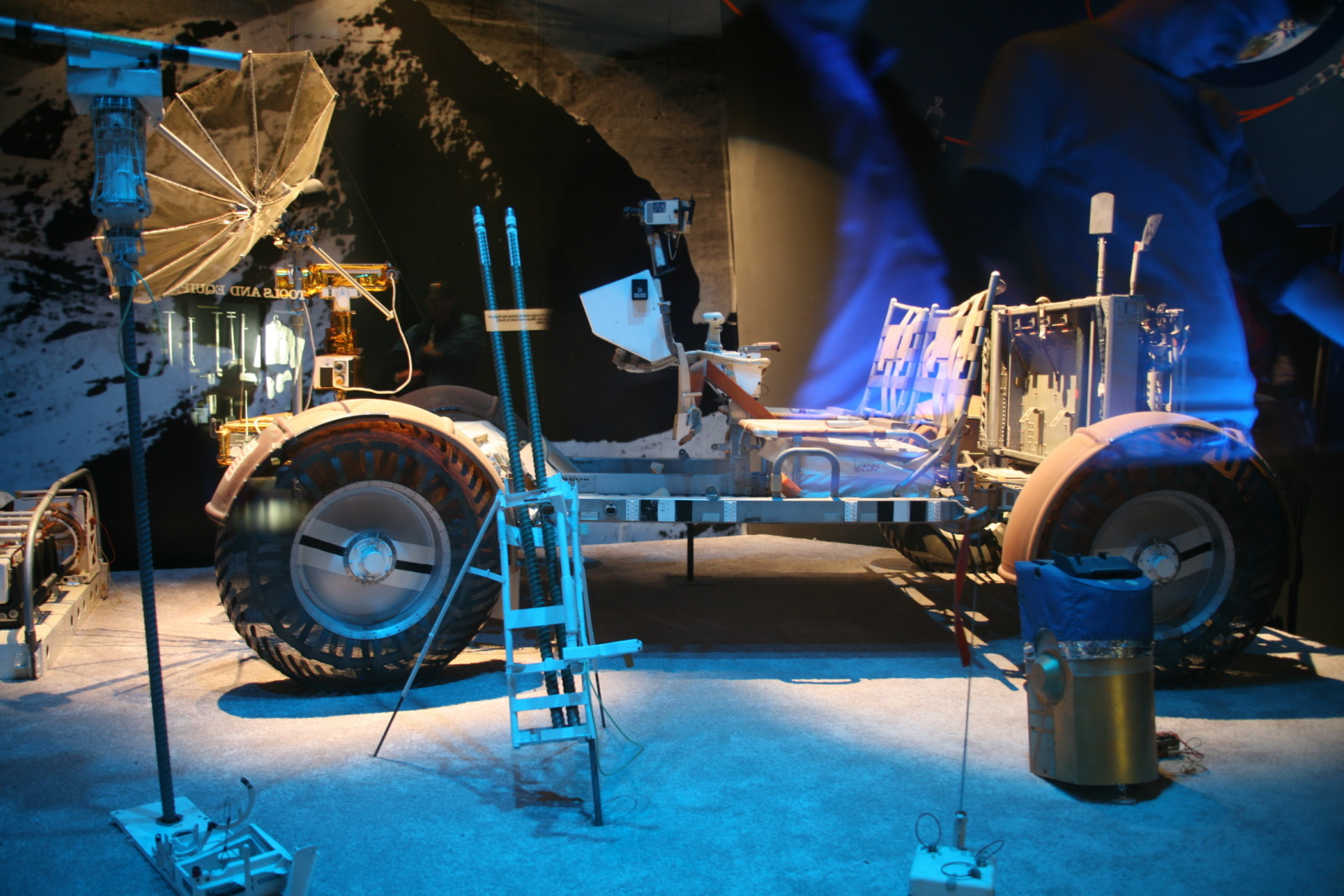
1971 Lunar Roving Vehicle (LRV) with joystick steering controls.

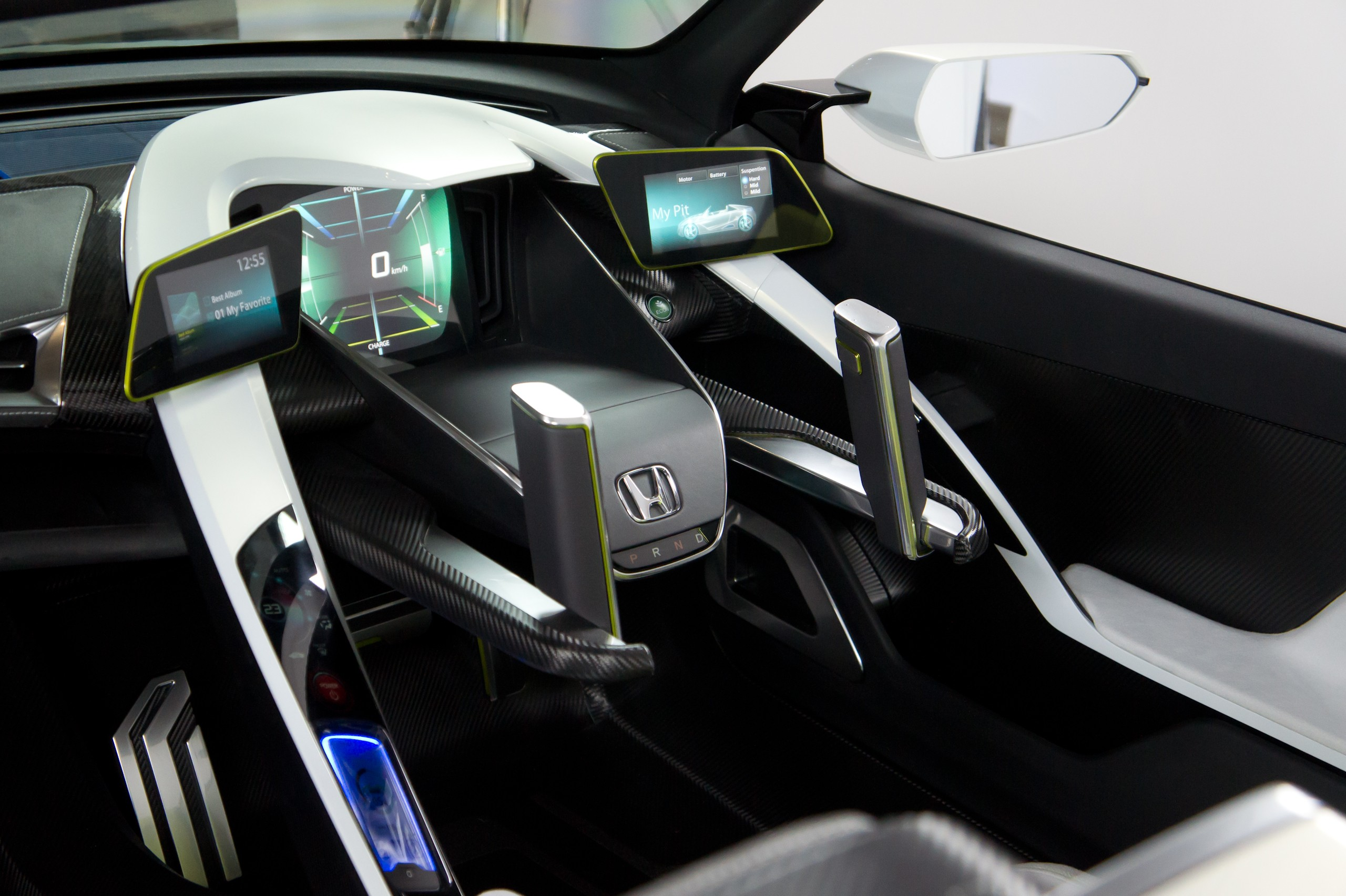
2012 Honda EV-STER "Twin Lever Steering" concept.

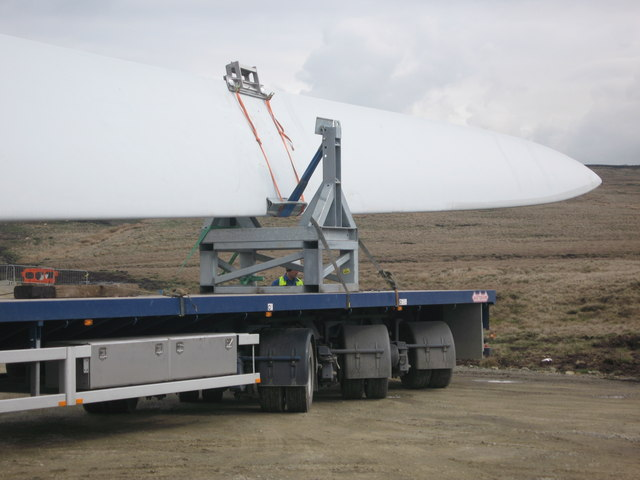
Heavy transport trailer with all-wheel steering remote controlled by a steersman walking at the rear of the trailer (2008).

The aim of steer-by-wire technology is to completely remove as many mechanical components (steering shaft, column, gear reduction mechanism, etc.) as possible. Completely replacing conventional steering system with steer-by-wire has several advantages, such as:

- The absence of steering column simplifies the car interior design.
- The absence of steering shaft, column and gear reduction mechanism allows much better space utilization in the engine compartment.
- The steering mechanism can be designed and installed as a modular unit.
- Without mechanical connection between the steering wheel and the road wheel, it is less likely that the impact of a frontal crash will cause the steering wheel to impact the driver.
- Steering system characteristics can easily be adjusted to change the steering response and feel.

Steer-by-wire without the use of a steering column was first offered in a production car with the Nissan Infiniti Q50 in 2013. Steer-by-wire continued to be offered with the QX50 and QX55, and as of 2022 is being offered with the Infiniti Q60 coupe.

Production battery electric vehicles in the 2020s that offer steer-by-wire with no steering column include the Canoo Lifestyle Vehicle, Lexus RZ 450e, REE Automotive P7-module-based vehicles, Toyota bZ4X, and Tesla Cybertruck. As of 2023 Lotus, Peugeot, and Mercedes-Benz plan to offer steer-by-wire cars in the mid to late 2020s.

=== Safety ===
Traditionally, cars feature a collapsible steering column (energy absorbing steering column) which will collapse in the event of a heavy frontal impact to avoid excessive injuries to the driver. Airbags are also generally fitted as standard. Non-collapsible steering columns fitted to older vehicles very often impaled drivers in frontal crashes, particularly when the steering box or rack was mounted in front of the front axle line, at the front of the crumple zone. This was particularly a problem on vehicles that had a rigid separate chassis frame with no crumple zone. Many modern vehicle steering boxes or racks are mounted behind the front axle on the front bulkhead, at the rear of the front crumple zone.

Collapsible steering columns were invented by Béla Barényi and were introduced in the 1959 Mercedes-Benz W111 Fintail, along with crumple zones. This safety feature first appeared on cars built by General Motors after an extensive and very public lobbying campaign enacted by Ralph Nader. Ford started to install collapsible steering columns in 1968.

Audi used a retractable steering wheel and seat belt tensioning system called procon-ten, but it has since been discontinued in favor of airbags and pyrotechnic seat belt pre-tensioners.

=== Cycles ===
In bicycles and motorcycles, leaning in the direction of the turn is required to counter the inertia of the vehicle, which would otherwise cause it to skid in a straight line. To make a two-wheeled vehicle lean into a turn, riders often steer briefly in the opposite direction to angle the wheels away from the turn, a process known as countersteering. At low speeds, the countersteering required to make a turn is almost unnoticeably small, but at a typical motorcycle's speed, large and deliberate countersteering is required to complete a turn quickly. The amount of countersteering required also depends on the vehicle's weight, as bicycles can often complete turns using only weight shifting. Similar techinques are also used to steer tilting three-wheeled vehicles, but rigid, non-tilting three-wheelers are steered similarly to cars, and can require differentials so that the wheel facing away from the turn can complete a longer distance than the wheel facing into the turn.

=== Differential steering ===
Differential steering is the primary means of steering tracked vehicles, such as tanks and bulldozers; it is also used in certain wheeled vehicles commonly known as skid-steers, and implemented in some automobiles, where it is called torque vectoring, to augment steering by changing wheel direction relative to the vehicle.

=== Regulations ===
- In the European Union, Russia and Japan, United Nations Economic Commission for Europe (UNECE) vehicle regulation 79 is related to steering.
- In the United States, Federal Motor Vehicle Safety Standards 203 and 204 are related to impact protection for the driver from the steering control system and steering control rearward displacement while 49 Code of Federal Regulations § 393.209 is related to steering wheel systems.
- In North America, "hands-off" or "hands-free" level-2 systems allowing the drivers to remove both hands from the steering wheel were introduced and legally permitted. General Motors' Super Cruise is such an implementation. In those designs warnings are raised when driver disengages his/her visual attention.
- In May 2023, in Europe, UNECE regulation 79 still requires assistant systems for steering to prompt drivers not to remove their hands from the steering wheel. Those systems are known as "hands-on" systems. With "hands-on" assisted driving systems, British and European drivers are required by the system itself to keep one or both hands on the steering wheel, as with unassisted driving: When driving with assisted steering, if drivers remove both hands from the steering wheel, an optical warning occurs after the first 15 seconds and an acoustic warning occurs after 15 more seconds. Assisted steering is deactivated after additional 30 seconds.
- In the United Kingdom, drivers must control the vehicle at all times, and Rule 160 of the Highway Code instructs to "drive with both hands on the wheel where possible." and to "use (ADAS) according to the manufacturer's instructions."

== Bicycles ==
The bicycle is steered by turning the handlebar and by the lean of the rider and the bicycle:

- Turning the handlebar rotates the front wheel with respect to the plane of the circumference of the rear wheel. Friction of the front wheel with the ground provides the lateral forces that steer the bicycle. Modern bicycles have the front-wheel ground-contact-point trailing behind the steering axis, which is the long axis of the bicycle fork through the center of the front wheel. This trailing contact point adds to the effects of inertia and center-of-mass offset which affect the steering and self-stability of the bicycle.
- Leaning the frame of the bicycle, which displaces the rider and parts of the bicycle in relation to the axis along the ground contact points of the wheels. Gravitational forces then provide the lateral forces that steer the bicycle.

== Watercraft ==
Ships and boats are usually steered with a rudder. Depending on the size of the vessel, rudders can be manually actuated, or operated using a servomechanism, or a trim tab or servo tab system. Rowing may be used to steer rowboats by using specific paddle strokes. Boats using outboard motors steer by rotating the entire drive unit. Boats with inboard motors sometimes steer by rotating the propeller pod only (i.e., Volvo Penta IPS drive). Steering wheels may be used to control the rudder or propeller. Modern ships with diesel-electric drive use azimuth thrusters. Boats powered by oars or paddles are steered by generating a higher propulsion force on the side of the boat opposite of the direction of turn. Jet skis are steered by weight-shift induced roll and water jet thrust vectoring.

The rudder of a vessel can steer the ship only when water is passing over it. Hence, when a ship is not moving relative to the water it is in or cannot move its rudder, it does not respond to the helm and is said to have lost steerage. The motion of a ship through the water is known as making way. Boats on rivers must always be under propulsion, even when traveling downstream, in order to steer, requiring sufficient water to pass over the surface of the rudder to effect changes in the direction of the boat in response to the helm. This is called having "steerage way".

== See also ==
- Active Yaw Control (AYC)
- Bump Steer
- Camber angle
- Camber thrust
- Caster angle
- Countersteering
- DIRAVI
- Dry steering
- HICAS
- Guidance (engineering)
- Kingpin
- Opposite lock
- Power steering
- Ship's wheel
- Skid steer
- Steer-by-wire
- Steering damper
- Steering kickback
- Steering ratio
- Steering wheel
- Steering wheel (ship)
- Tiller
- Torque steering
- Turning radius
- Vehicle dynamics
