= Arthur Ernest Bishop =

Australian engineer and inventor

- Born: 1917; Roseville, New South Wales
- Died: 2006 (aged 88–89)
- Occupation: Engineer
- Known for: Automobile steering

Arthur Ernest Bishop AM (1917 – 2006) was an Australian engineer and inventor.

== Life ==
Bishop was born in Sydney, New South Wales in 1917. He demonstrated highly innovative capabilities during the Second World War relating to overcoming problems of instability of aircraft tail-wheel landing gear during take-off and landing, and was awarded license fees for his inventions. These were significant and partly as a result, he was able in 1954 to move to Detroit, Michigan, United States, with ideas and patents to improve steering systems for automobiles, and for the next two decades introduced improvements into various vehicles around the world mainly in aspects of hydraulically powered and variable-ratio steering. In order to license the ideas or supply purpose-built manufacturing equipment, he developed both lower-cost methods for mass production, while also giving improvements to steering feel and vehicle response. By the 1970s he had returned to Australia as a base, and had developed a variable-ratio rack and pinion using a normal pinion, regarded at the time by gearing experts as being theoretically impossible, and also a low-cost forging method for the variable rack to eliminate machining of the teeth. His organisation grew to include over 200 personnel world-wide, and he created over 300 patents.

== Global policy ==
He was one of the signatories of the agreement to convene a convention for drafting a world constitution. As a result, for the first time in human history, a World Constituent Assembly convened to draft and adopt the Constitution for the Federation of Earth.

== Death ==
He died in 2006.

== Awards ==
- 1984 Member of the Order of Australia.
- 2001 Centenary Medal
- As well as receiving a number of Australian awards, in 2003 he was elected as the first Australian Fellow of the Society of Automotive Engineers International.
