= Steer-by-wire =

Automotive technology

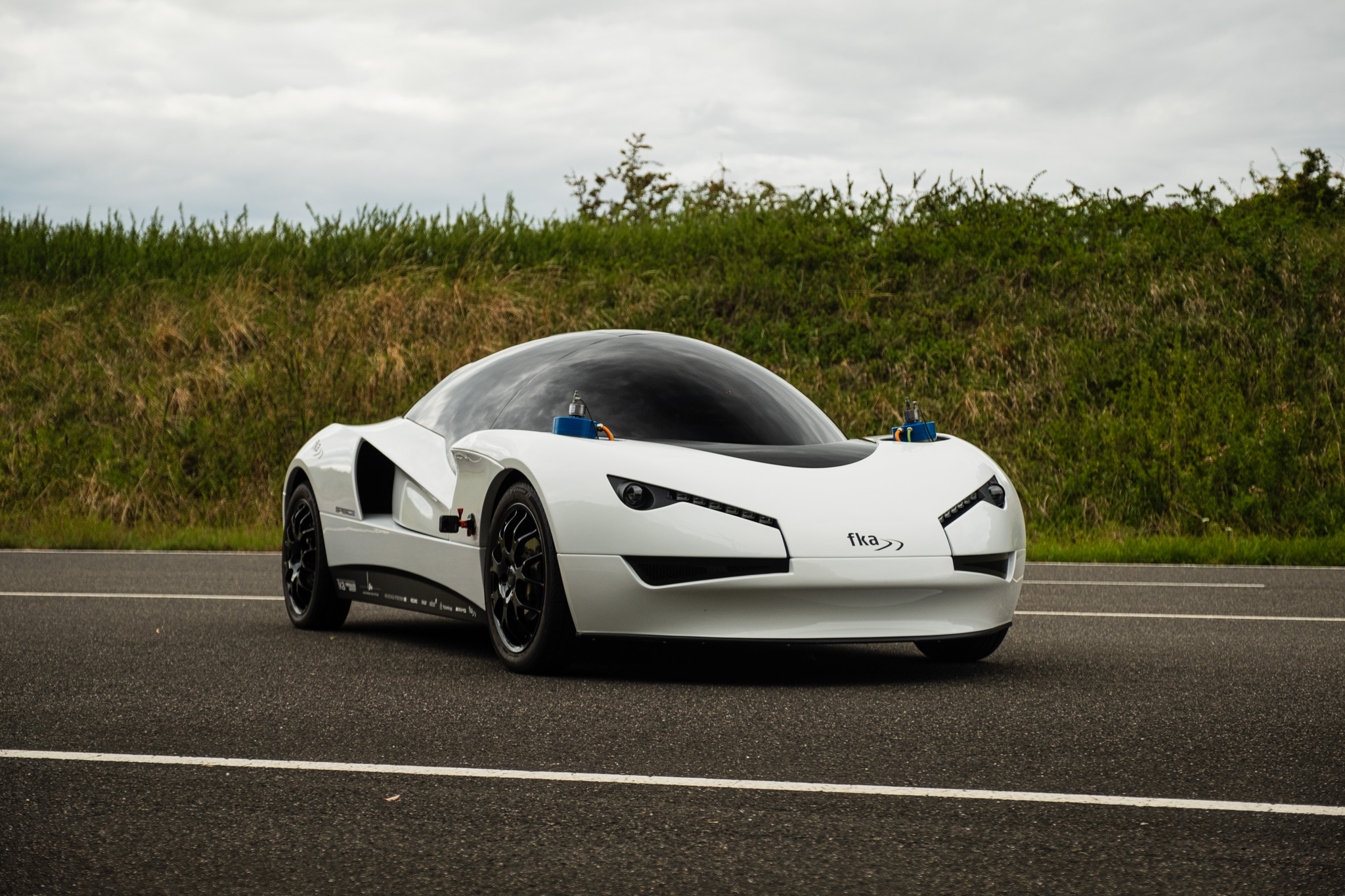
SpeedE, an academic concept car developed for studying drive-by-wire technologies

Steer-by-wire, in the context of the automotive industry, is a technology or system that allows steering some or all of a vehicle's wheels without a steering column that turns the direction of those wheels mechanically. It is different from electric power steering or power-assist, as those systems still rely on the steering column to transfer some steering torque to the wheels. It is often associated with other drive by wire technologies.

A vehicle with a steer-by-wire system may be manually controlled by a driver through a steering wheel, a yoke, or any other controller which is connected to one or more electronic control units, which uses the input to control steering actuators that turn the wheels side-to-side, steering the vehicle. The steering wheel or yoke may be equipped with haptic feedback to simulate road feel and wheel resistance, and change depending on the vehicle speed or customizable settings.

The safety of drive-by-wire systems is often ensured through redundancy, for example through redundant input sensors, redundant vehicle communication networks and power grids, redundant steering actuators per wheel, and fail-operational steering. If steering fails for one or even two wheels, the system can compensate with torque vectoring using the other available wheels.

== Architecture and service considerations ==
Steer-by-wire systems can be divided into designs that retain a mechanical fallback and designs that remove the mechanical steering link entirely. Systems with a fallback connection may use electronic steering control during normal operation while retaining a clutch or other mechanism that can reconnect the steering wheel to the rack during a fault. No-column systems depend more directly on redundant sensors, controllers, power supplies, communication paths, and road-wheel actuators because there is no continuous mechanical path between the driver control and the steered wheels.

A typical system may include a steering angle sensor, a steering wheel or yoke feedback motor, one or more electronic control units, road-wheel actuators, and redundant electrical or data links. Because steering feel is generated electronically, the system can vary steering ratio, effort, and self-centering behavior by speed or driving mode. Service work that affects steering geometry, suspension alignment, steering actuators, or related sensors may require calibration or diagnostic checks before the system operates as intended.

== One-off vehicles ==
Up-fitted drive-by-wire systems, such as the Paravan Space Drive, have been available since as early as 2003 for existing production vehicles.

Several one-off vehicles and concept vehicles implemented steer-by-wire, such as the early-1990s Saab Prometheus, 1996 Mercedes F200, 2001 SKF Filo based on the Opel Zafira, 2003 General Motors Hy-wire, 2005 GM Sequel, 2007 Mazda Ryuga, and others.

Schaeffler Paravan Technologie has provided steer-by-wire systems for one-off racing vehicles, for example: a steer-by-wire Porsche Cayman GT4 raced the 2020 24 Hours of Nürburgring and finished 2nd place in its class and 29th overall; a steer-by-wire Mercedes-AMG GT3 raced the following year using the same system and finished 16th overall.

== Production combustion-engine vehicles ==
=== Coupled with traditional steering ===
Rear-axle-only steer-by-wire may be coupled with traditional front wheel steering for conditional four-wheel steering, reducing turning radius at low speeds and increasing stability at high speeds. Purely mechanical four-wheel steering systems have been available in production cars since the mid 1980s, soon followed by computer-controlled systems in the late 1980s. Manufacturers implementing these systems included Citroën, Honda, Isuzu, Mazda, Mitsubishi, Nissan, Porsche, and Toyota. The popularity of four-wheel steering waned in the 1990s, with few models being offered in the early 2000s. Four-wheel steering systems reappeared in the late 2000s and 2010s in models by manufacturers including Acura, BMW, Nissan, Porsche, and Renault. Car manufacturers that have offered rear-axle steering in the 2020s include Acura, Audi, Bentley, BMW, Cadillac, Ferrari, General Motors, Genesis, Lamborghini, Lexus, Mercedes-Benz, Porsche, and Rolls-Royce.

One such rear-axle-only steer-by-wire system couple with traditional front steering was Quadrasteer. It was developed by Delphi and was offered starting 2002 on some General Motors trucks. Despite favorable reception the system was discontinued in 2005 due to poor market penetration of only 17 percent of sales of the same model, partially due to lack of familiarity with the system and partially due to its $1000 mark-up.

Rolls-Royce vehicles based on the Architecture of Luxury platform, such as the Cullinan, Spectre, Ghost, and Phantom, have computer-controlled four-wheel steering. The front wheel steering uses electric power assist while an electronic system controls the rear wheel steering and turns them in the opposite direction of the front wheels when turning at lower speeds, and slightly in the same direction as the front wheels at higher speeds in order to increase stability.

=== Without traditional steering ===
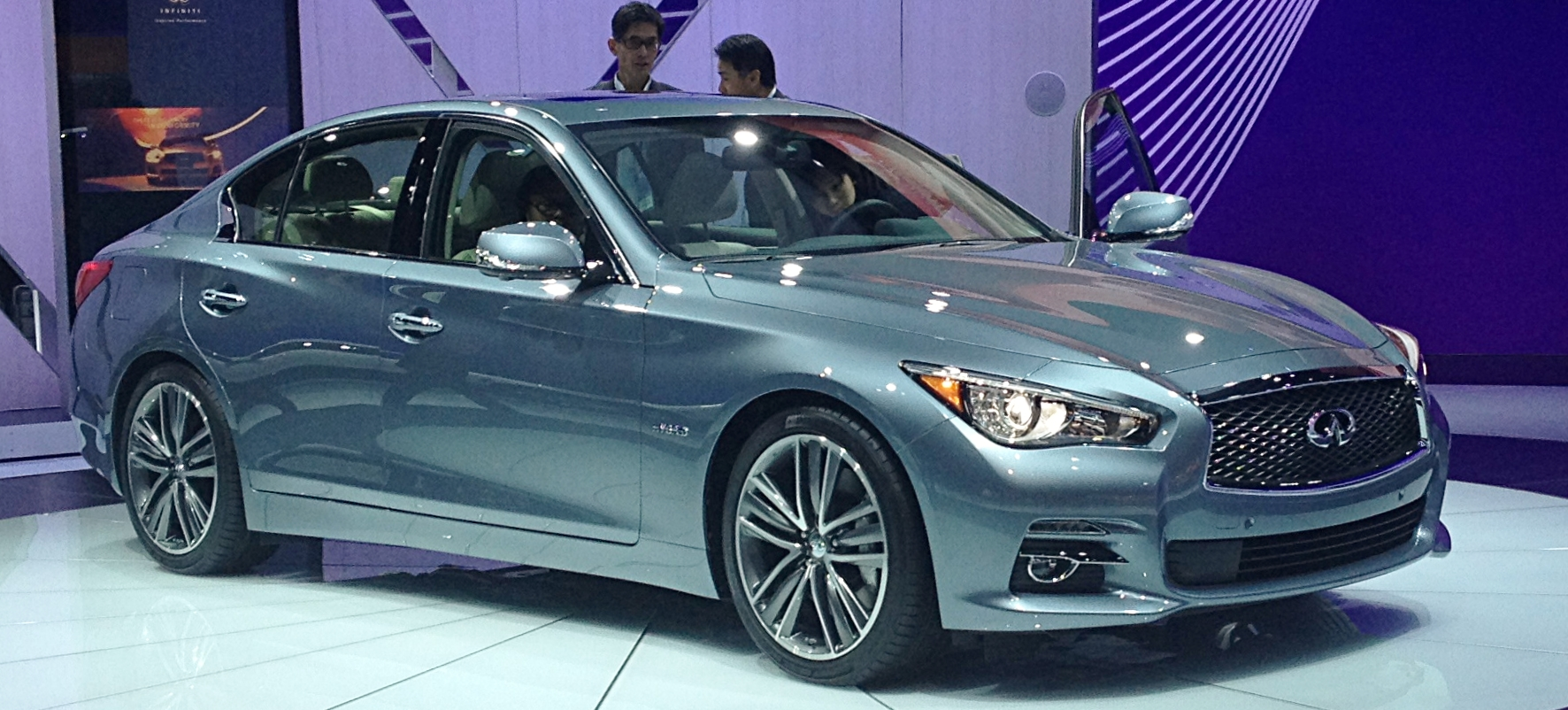
The Infiniti Q50 was the first production road-vehicle without a traditional steering column, though one was still equipped as a backup.

Steer-by-wire without the use of a steering column was first offered in a production car with the Infiniti Q50 in 2013. The system has a backup steering column separated from the steering wheel with a clutch. The clutch connects the steering wheel to the steering rack in case of failure of the electronic steering sensors or actuators. After negative reception the model was retrofitted with traditional hydraulic steering. Steer-by-wire continued to be offered with the QX50 and QX55, and as late as 2022 it was being offered with the Infiniti Q60 coupe, which was discontinued that year.

== Production electric vehicles ==
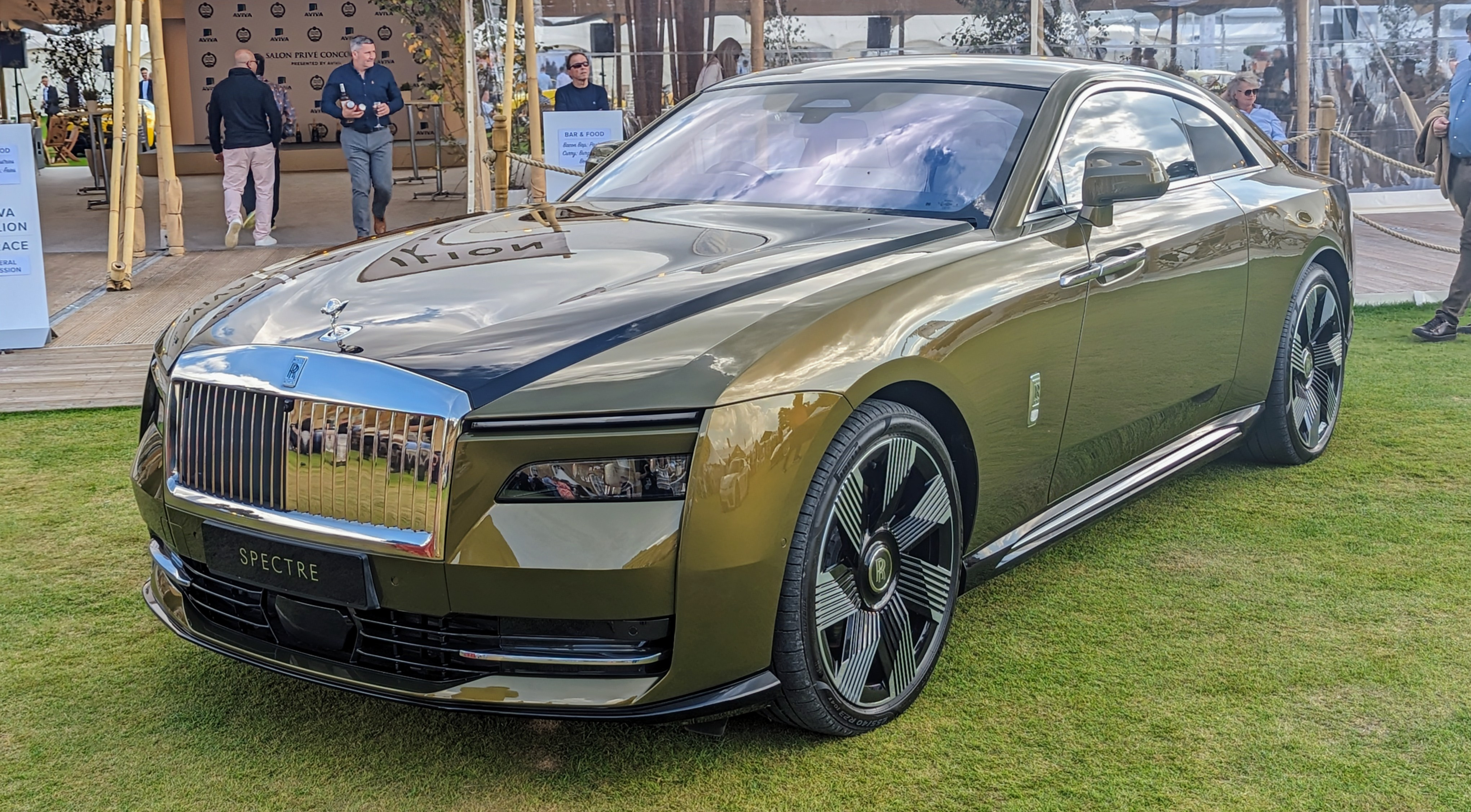
Rolls-Royce Spectre

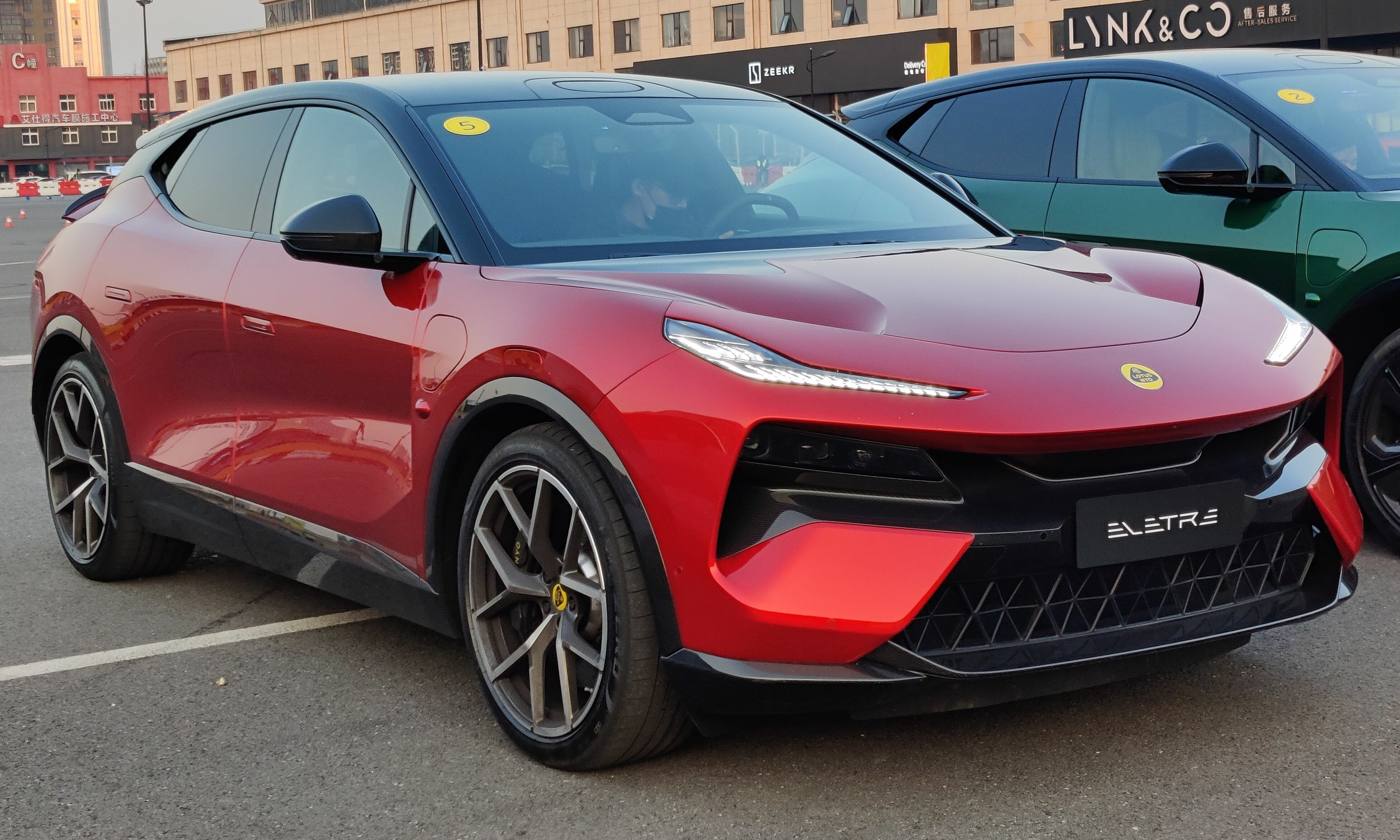
Lotus Eletre

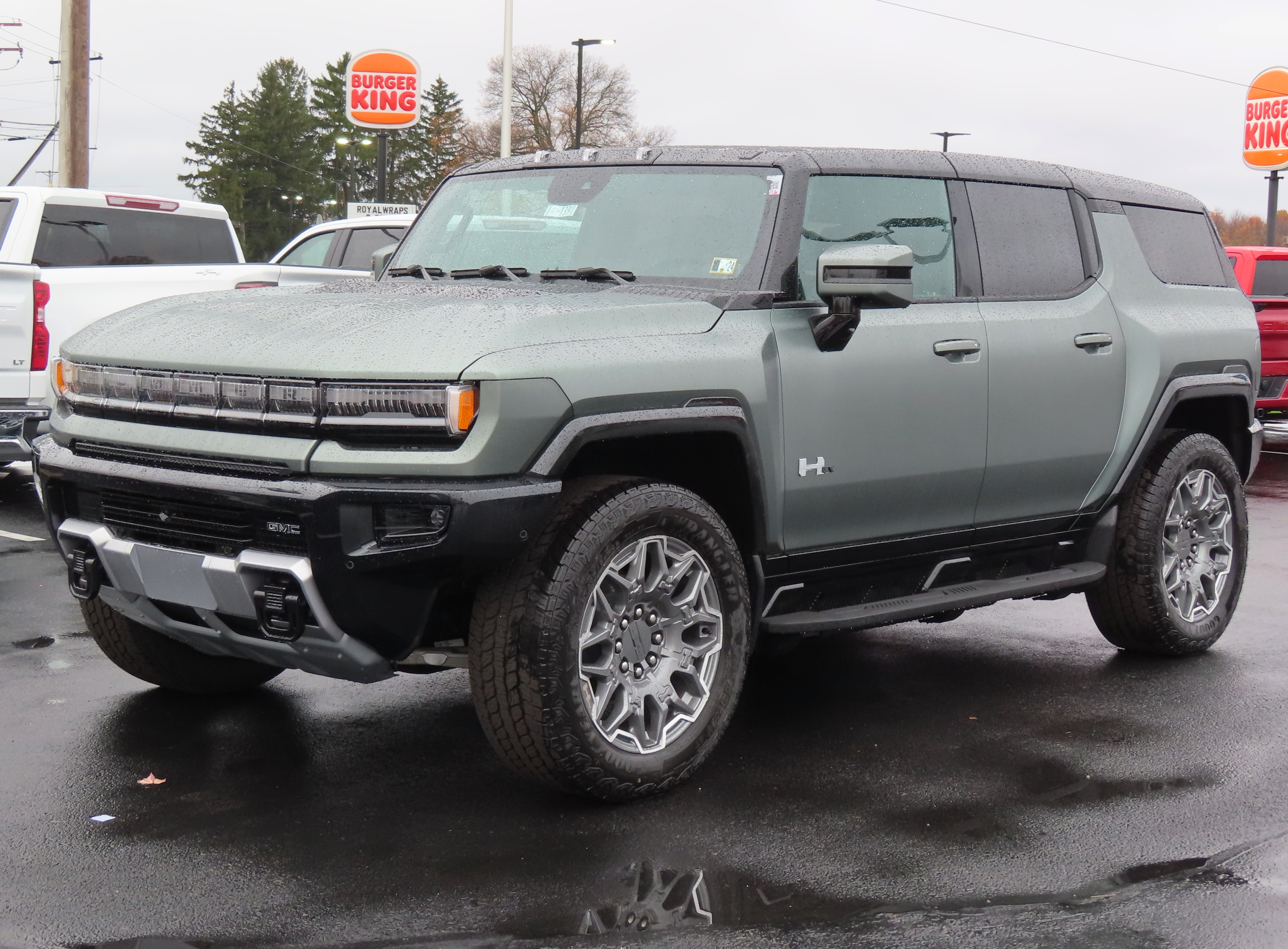
GMC Hummer EV

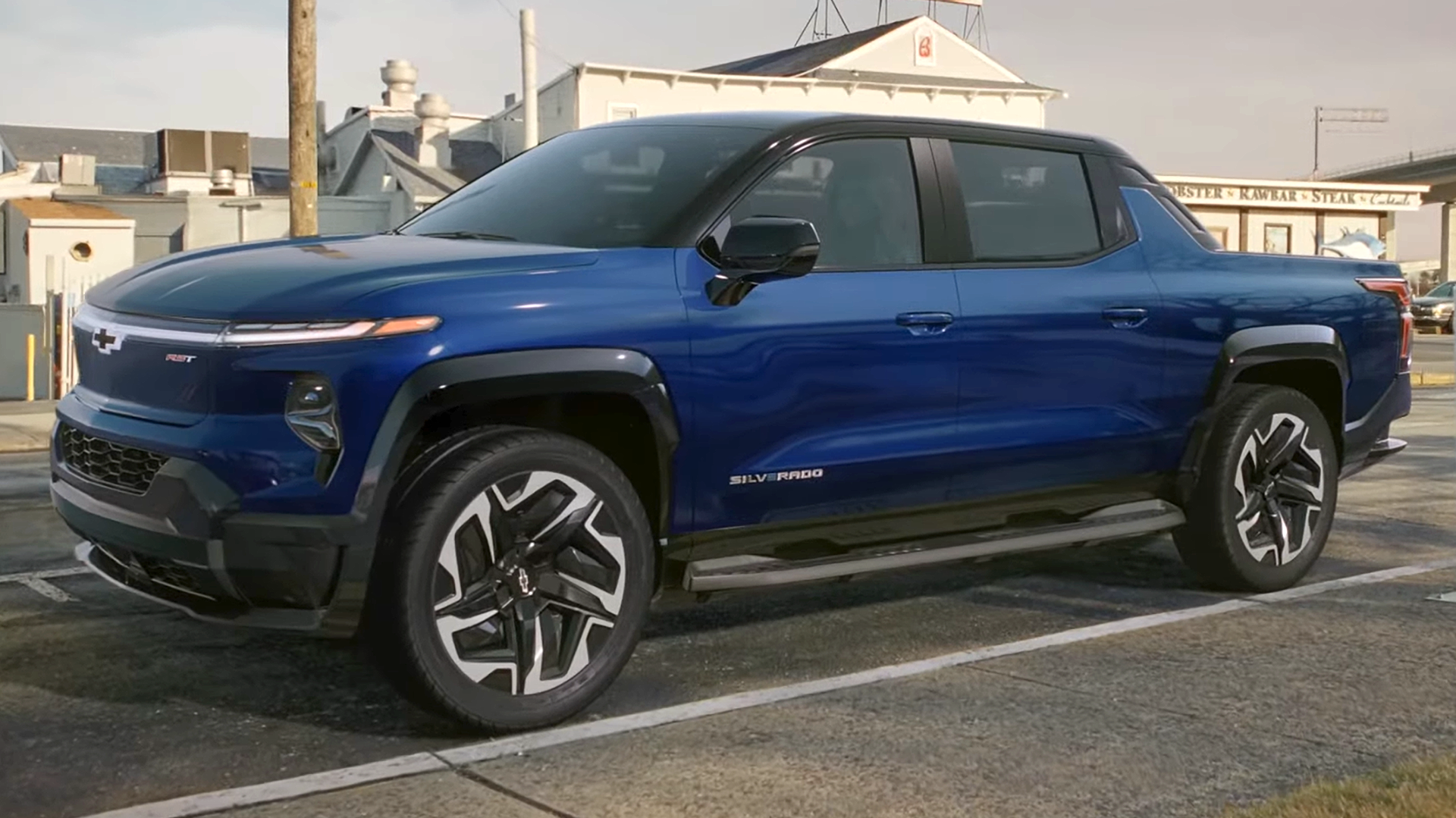
Chevrolet Silverado EV

Production electric vehicles with rear SbW and a traditional steering column.

Production battery electric vehicles (BEVs) with rear-axle SbW coupled with traditional front-wheel steering include as of 2024 the Rolls-Royce Spectre, Lotus Eletre, GMC Hummer EV, and Chevrolet Silverado EV.

Production BEVs with steer-by-wire with no steering column include as of 2024 the Tesla Cybertruck. Planned production vehicles with no-steering-column SbW as of 2023 include: Lexus RZ 450e, Nio ET9, Toyota bZ4X, and Geely Super Van. As of 2023 Lotus, Mercedes-Benz, and Peugeot plan to offer no-steering-column steer-by-wire cars in the mid to late 2020s.

== See also ==
- Fly-by-wire
