= Quadrasteer =

Four wheel steering system

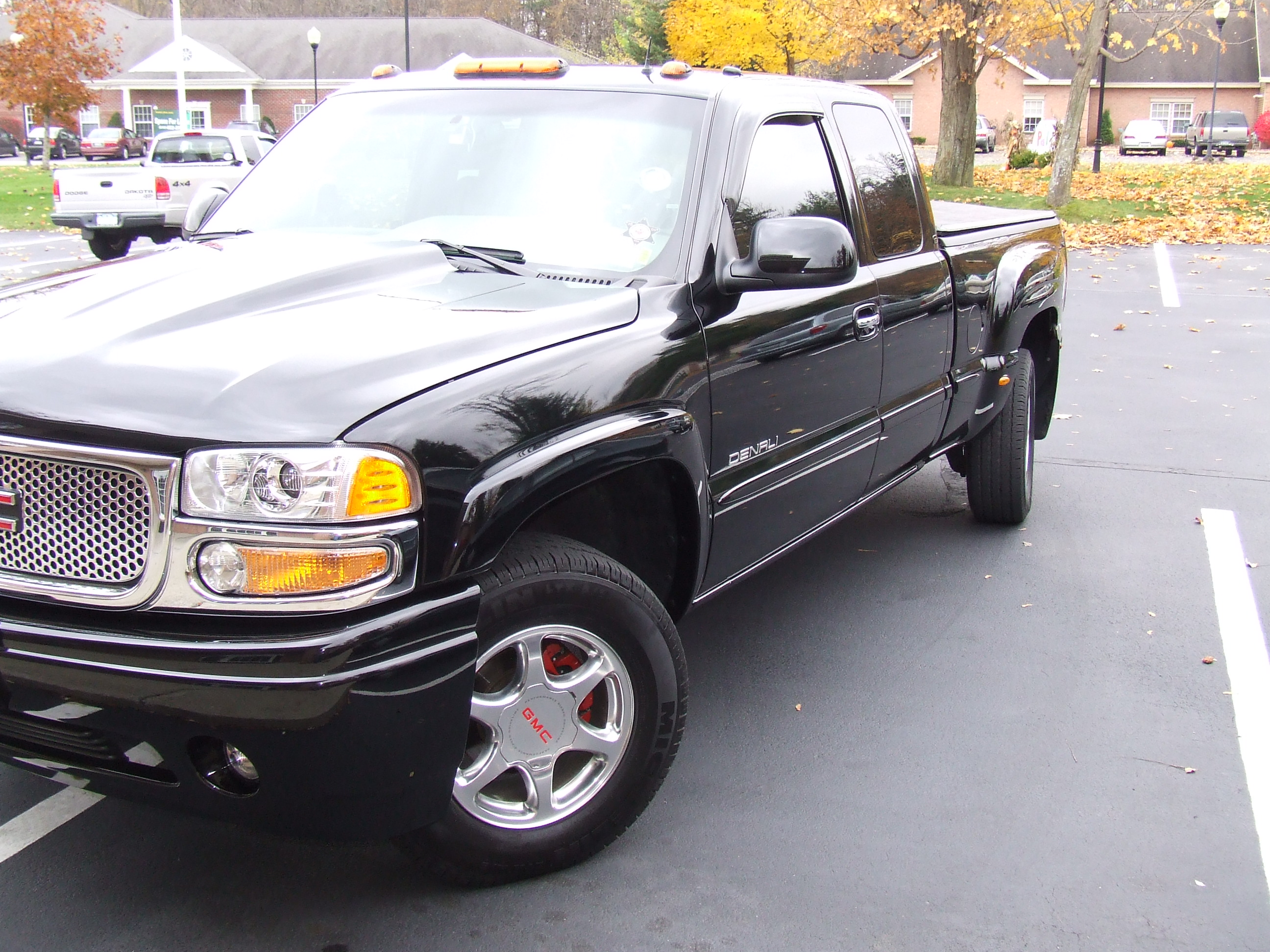
A GMC Sierra Denali equipped with Quadrasteer, rear steering angle

Quadrasteer is the name of a four wheel steering system developed by Delphi Automotive while under the ownership of General Motors for use in automobiles. It was available as an option on GM's full-size pickup trucks and 2500 Suburbans for model years 2002 through 2005.

The system enables the vehicle to turn tighter. It was initially a $7,000 option. The cost was lowered to $5,600, $2,000 and eventually $1,000 in order to boost sales. The steering system was popular for applications frequently towing boats, fifth wheels, or other large equipment.

== Mechanics ==
The system was primarily used on pickup trucks. At lower speeds, it turns in opposite direction of the forward wheels to a maximum of 15°, or 12° in trailer mode, decreasing the turning radius as much as 21%. At higher speeds the system will turn the rear wheels slightly in the direction of the front wheels so as to increase stability and control. The rear axle is based on the Dana 60 axle.

Vehicles that offered the upgrade include:

- Chevrolet Silverado / GMC Sierra models
- Chevrolet Suburban / GMC Yukon XL

== See also ==
- HICAS
- Four-wheel steering
