= Robert Pittman =

Robert or Bob Pittman may refer to:

- Robert C. Pittman (1922–1996), American pilot and entrepreneur
- Robert Pittman (media executive) (born 1953), founder of MTV
- Bob Pittman, fictional sailor narrator of Newfoundland song "The Ryans and the Pittmans"

== See also ==
- Robert Carter Pitman (1825–1891), Superior Court judge in Massachusetts and legislator in the Massachusetts General Court
- Robert L. Pitman (born 1962), United States district judge of the United States District Court for the Western District of Texas
- Pittman (disambiguation)
