= Henry Pitman =

Henry Pitman may refer to:

- Henry Hoʻolulu Pitman (1845–1863), American Union Army soldier of Native Hawaiian descent
- Sir Henry Alfred Pitman (1808–1908), English physician
