= Pailton Engineering Ltd =

Pailton Engineering manufacture steering system components such as steering columns, steering shafts, drag links and ball joints and deliver around the world with sales offices in the UK, USA and Germany.

== A brief history ==
Pailton Engineering was founded in 1969 in the Village of Pailton, Warwickshire near the city of Coventry which is situated in the heart of the Industrial Midlands and today occupies an 80,000 sq. ft. factory employing in excess of 150 people, the business has been family owned since its formation. Originally a sub contract manufacturing facility, in 1982 Pailton developed their own range of universal joints and sliding shafts for steering systems.

Continued expansion in the steering product market followed with the introduction in 1995 of the Pailton Mitre box or Bevel box, a device to allow 90 degree changes in direction of the steering input shaft with low backlash and no universal joint phasing allowing the steering box to be positioned in a place more favourable to the steering gear for actuation, while still placing the steering column in the best position for the driver.

As Pailton were growing their product range so was the market reach, due to the opening in 1999 of Pailton Inc. in Valparaiso, Indiana, USA.

In 2001 Pailton acquired SLT the steering division of Sachsenring AG resulting a manufacturing facility in Germany concentrating on ball joint manufacture.

In 2009 Pailton installed a new waste water system to handle the waste water from the machining processes. Previously the water had to be collected and disposed of off site every 6 weeks, but with the installation of the new waste water handling system, developed by the specialist Aqua-Save Technologies, this is now reduced to once every two years.

In July 2010 Pailton were part of a group of companies supporting an all-British bid for the replacement of Snatch Land Rovers for the British forces. As a result Pailton concentrated on military and defence vehicle applications, winning business with companies such as Force Protection Inc and Oshkosh Corporation.

Pailton Engineering run Technical and Craft Apprenticeships within the company and managing director John Nollett actively supports apprenticeship schemes.

In 2011 MD John Nollett won the Insider News "International Entrepreneur of the Year" award.

In 2011 Pailton Engineering won the Birmingham Post "Company of the Year" award and the "Technology and Manufacturing" award.
