= John Pitman =

John Pitman may refer to:

- John Pitman (judge) (1785–1864), United States federal judge
- John Pitman (journalist) (1939–2018), British reporter and interviewer
- John Pitman (tennis), player in the 1933 U.S. National Championships - Men's Singles
- John A. Pittman (1928–1995), U.S. soldier
- John Rogers Pitman (1782–1861), English clergyman and author

== See also ==
- John (given name)
- Pitman (disambiguation)
