= Pitman =

Pitman may refer to:

- A coal miner, particularly in Northern England
- Pitman (surname)
- Pitman, New Jersey, United States
- Pitman, Pennsylvania, United States
- Pitman, Saskatchewan, Canada
- Pitman Shorthand, a system of shorthand
- Pitman arm, a vehicle steering component
- A connecting rod in an engine
- Pitman (video game), a video game for the Game Boy
- Pitman (publisher), an imprint of Pearson Education, successor to Isaac Pitman and Sons
- Pitman Training, a British training provider originally founded by Isaac Pitman
- MC Pitman, British comedy rapper

== See also ==
- "The Pitman's Courtship", a Geordie folk song
- "The Pitman’s Happy Times", a Geordie folk song
- "The Pitman's Revenge", a Geordie folk song
- Pittman (disambiguation)
