= Steering system =

Steering system may refer to:

- Steering
- Steering linkage
- Active steering
- Power steering
