= Ritman =

Ritman is a surname. Notable people with the surname include:

- Jon Ritman (born c. 1968), British game designer and programmer
- Joost Ritman (born 1941), Dutch businessman
- Louis Ritman (1889–1963), American painter

== See also ==
- Pitman (surname)
