= Nissan Fairlady Z (S30) =

Japanese sports car produced 1969 to 1978

Nissan Fairlady Z (Datsun 240Z, 260Z, and 280Z)
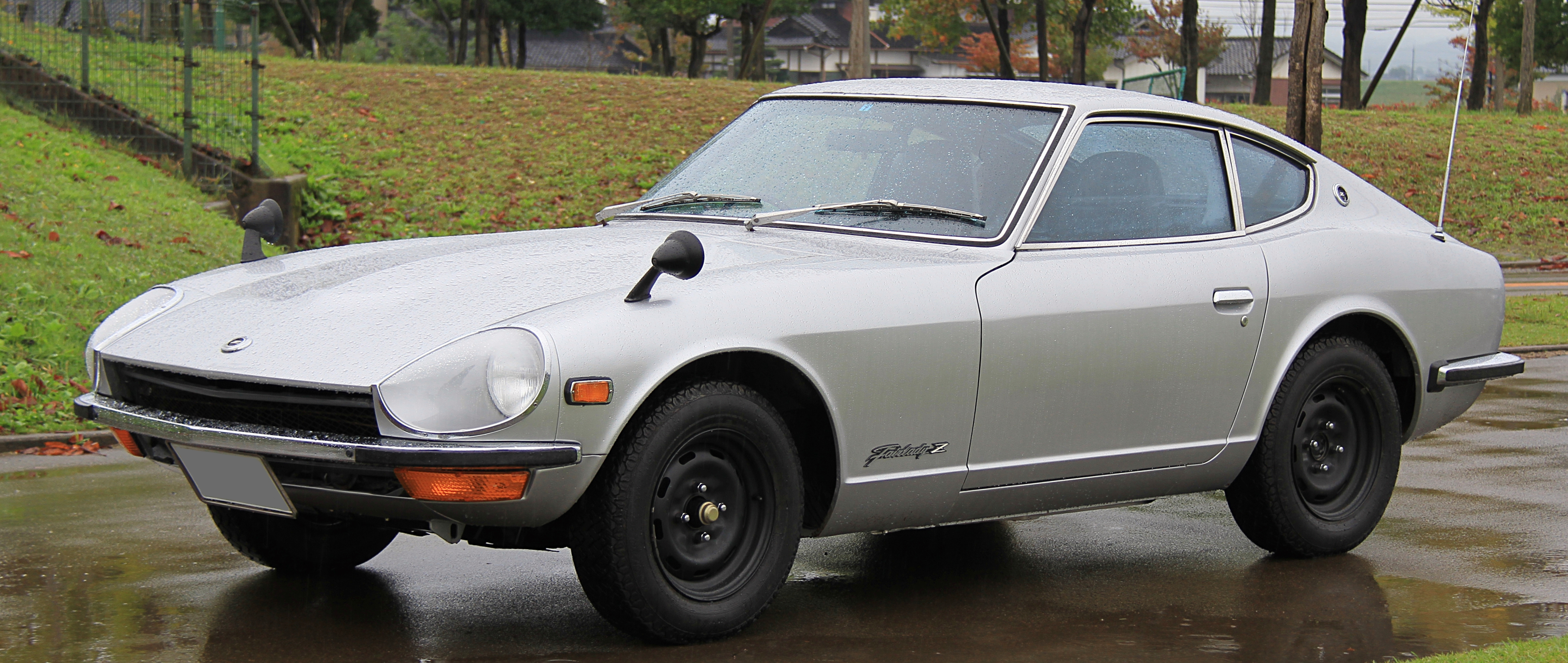
- 1970–1973 Nissan Fairlady Z

Overview
- Manufacturer: Nissan
- Also called: Nissan Fairlady Z; Datsun 240Z; Datsun 260Z; Datsun 280Z
- Production: 1969–1978
- Assembly: Japan: Hiratsuka, Kanagawa (Nissan Shatai Plant)
- Designer: Yoshihiko Matsuo

Body and chassis
- Class: Sports car
- Body style: 3-door hatchback coupé; 3-door hatchback 2+2 coupé
- Layout: Front mid-engine, rear-wheel-drive

Chronology
- Predecessor: Datsun Sports
- Successor: Nissan Fairlady Z (S130)

The Nissan S30, sold in Japan as the Nissan Fairlady Z but badged as the Datsun 240Z, 260Z, and 280Z for export, are 2-seat sports cars and 2+2 GT cars produced by Nissan from 1969 until 1978. The S30 was conceived of by Yutaka Katayama, the President of Nissan Motor Corporation U.S.A., and designed by a team led by Yoshihiko Matsuo, the head of Nissan's Sports Car Styling Studio. It is the first car in Nissan's Z series of sports cars.

The S30 had four-wheel independent suspension and an overhead camshaft straight-six engine, features identified with far more expensive premium European sports cars and coupés such as the Jaguar E-Type and BMW 2800 CS, but absent from similarly priced sports cars such as the Alfa Romeo Spider, MGB and Opel GT, which had smaller four-cylinder engines and rear live axles. The S30's styling, engineering, relatively low price, and impressive performance resonated with the public, received a positive response from both buyers and the motoring press, and immediately generated long waiting lists.

As a halo car, the S30 contributed to the popularization of Japanese carmakers beyond producers of traditional economy cars. Datsun's growing dealer network—compared to those of imported sports cars manufactured by Jaguar, BMW, Porsche, Alfa Romeo, and Fiat—played a major role in this popularization.

The S30 was initially sold alongside the smaller four-cylinder Datsun Sports, which was dropped from production in 1970. The S30 240Z is unrelated to the later 240SX, sold as the Silvia in Japan.

== Fairlady Z ==
Nissan Fairlady Z
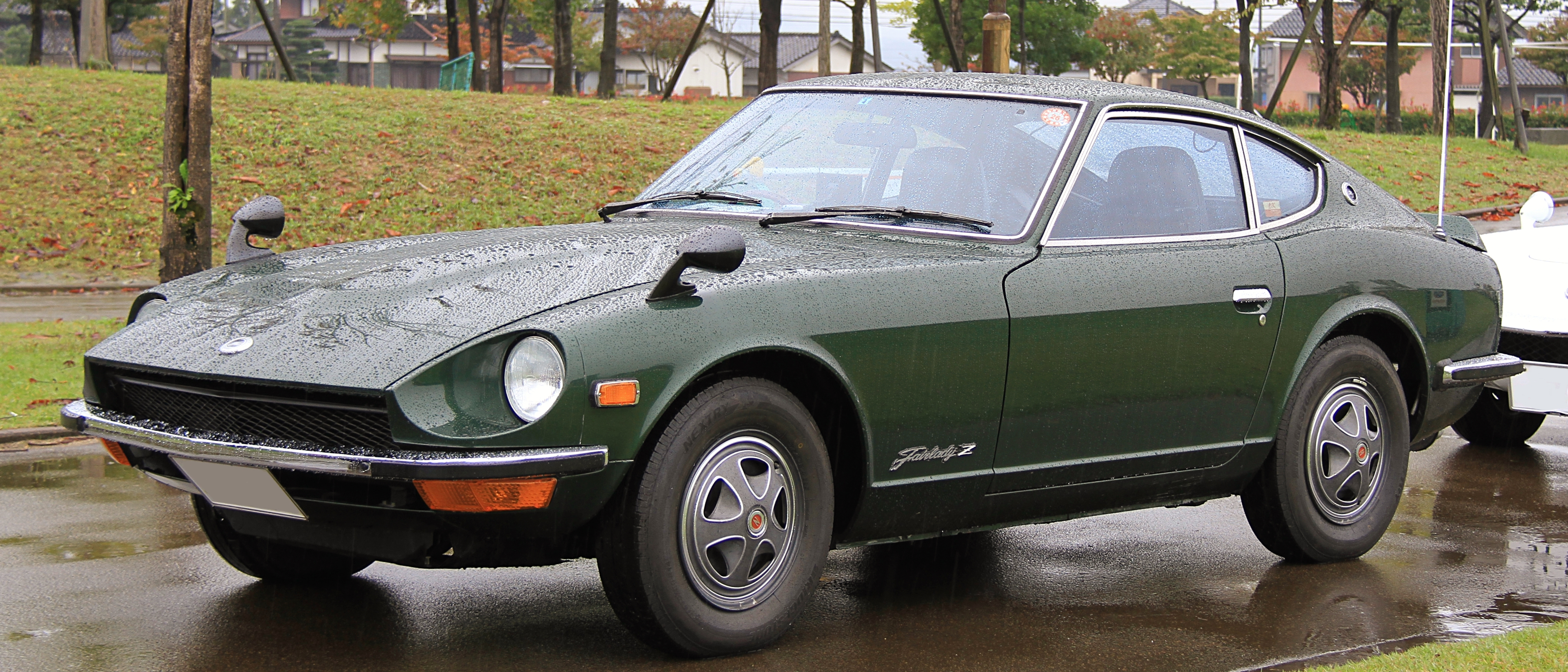
- 1977 Nissan Fairlady Z (S31)

Overview
- Also called: Nissan Fairlady Z
- Production: 1969–1978

Body and chassis
- Body style: 3-door coupé

Powertrain
- Engine: 1990 cc S20 DOHC 24v I6 (PS30); 1998 cc L20 I6 (S30/GS30); 2393 cc L24 I6 (HS30)
- Transmission: 4/5-speed manual; 3-speed automatic (1971 only)

Dimensions
- Wheelbase: 2,305 mm (90.7 in) (2-seater); 2,605 mm (102.6 in) (2+2)
- Length: 4,115 mm (162.0 in); 4,305 mm (169.5 in) (240ZG); 4,425 mm (174.2 in) (2+2)
- Width: 1,630 mm (64.2 in); 1,690 mm (66.5 in) (240ZG); 1,650 mm (65.0 in) (2+2)
- Height: 1,285–1,305 mm (50.6–51.4 in)
- Curb weight: 975–1,205 kg (2,150–2,657 lb)

Chronology
- Successor: Nissan Fairlady Z (S130)

The Fairlady Z was introduced in late 1969 as a 1970 model, with the L20 2.0-liter straight-six SOHC engine, rear-wheel drive, and a stylish coupé body. In Japanese specifications the engine, based on the Datsun 510's four-cylinder, produced 130 PS JIS (96 kW; 128 hp) and came with a four- or a five-speed manual transmission. For 1973, power of the carburetted engine dropped to 125 PS JIS (92 kW; 123 hp) to meet stricter regulations. In Japan, the Fairlady was exclusive to Nissan Japanese dealerships called Nissan Store. Japanese buyers could also get the L24-engined Fairlady 240Z model (HS30), although the larger engine placed it in a considerably higher tax category. The Japanese-spec 2.4-liter engine produces a claimed 150 PS JIS (110 kW; 148 hp) at 5,600 rpm but was discontinued in 1973 as sales had dropped considerably as a result of the fuel crisis, and so until the August 1978 introduction of the Fairlady 280Z only two-liter Fairladys were available in the home market.

When export models changed over to the larger 2.6-liter 260Z in 1974, only 2-liter models remained available to Japanese buyers. A Fairlady 260Z had been planned for release, but the impact of the oil crisis stopped the model, although the 260Z was available in Okinawa (which drove on the right side of the road until 1978). The Fairlady Z received all the changes as applied to the export models, including the addition of a long-wheelbase 2+2 model. Introduced in January 1974, this received the GS30 chassis code. In 1975 the L20 engine gained fuel injection to meet new emissions standards (A-S30, A-GS30) and once again provided 130 PS JIS (96 kW; 128 hp). At the end of July 1976 the car received the NAPS system, including an EGR system, to meet the stricter yet emissions standards in effect for this year, bringing with it a change in model codes to S31 (C-S31/C-GS31). At the same time, the more luxurious Fairlady Z-T model was introduced - this was strictly an equipment level and did not include a T-bar roof, which was first seen on the succeeding generation Fairlady.

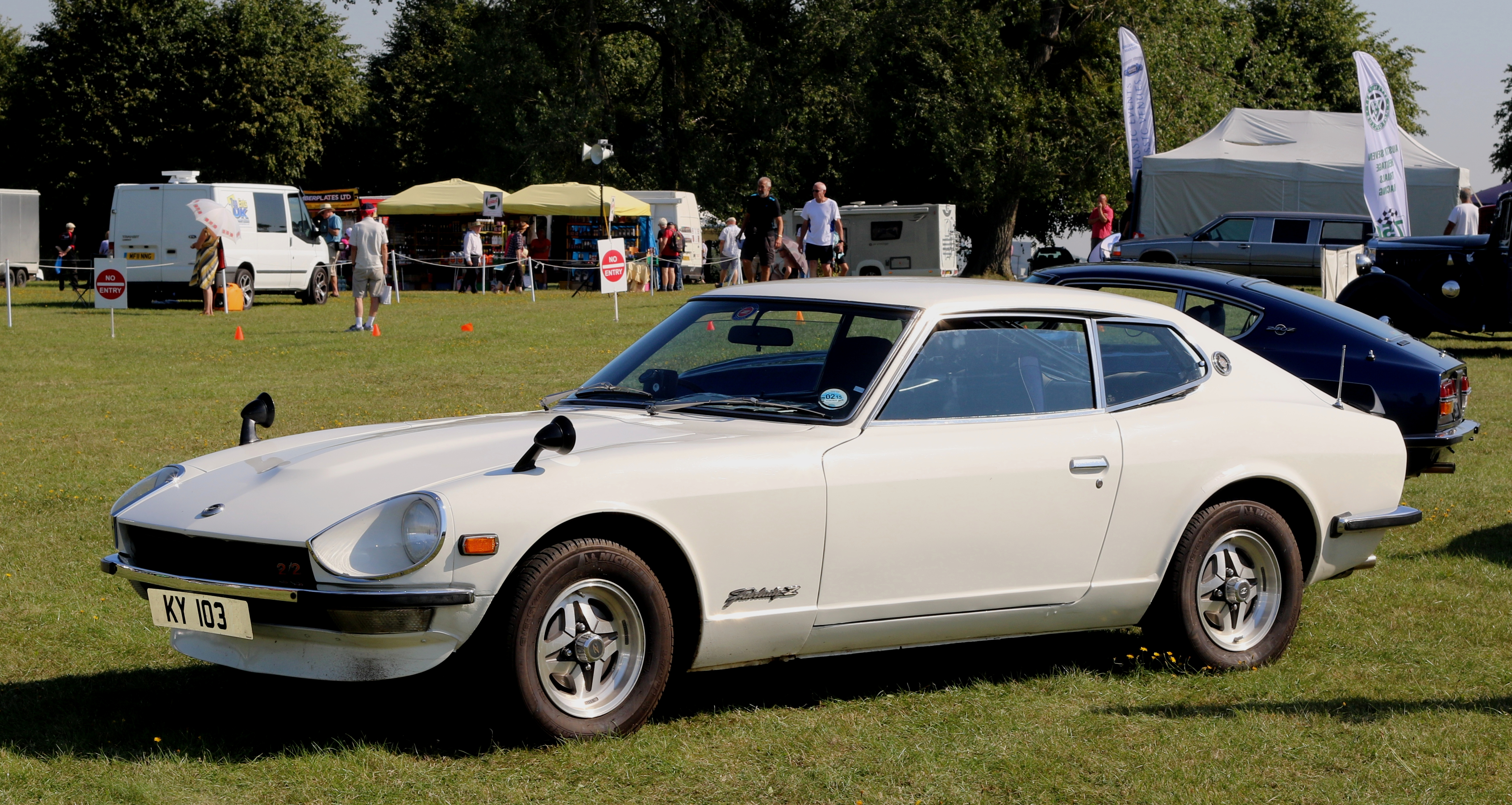
1974 Nissan Fairlady Z 2+2 (GS30)

=== Fairlady ZG ===
The Japan-only HS30-H Nissan Fairlady 240ZG was released in Japan in October 1971 to homologate the 240Z for Group 4 racing. Differences between the Fairlady ZG and an export-market Datsun 240Z include an extended fiberglass "aero-dyna" nose, wider over-fenders riveted to the body, a rear spoiler, acrylic glass headlight covers and fender-mounted rear-view mirrors. The ZG's better aerodynamics allowed it to reach a top speed of 210 km/h (130 mph), five more than the regular Fairlady 240Z (automatics' top speeds were 5 km/h lower).

The Fairlady ZG was available in three colors: Grand Prix Red, Grand Prix White, and Grand Prix Maroon. The "G" in Fairlady ZG stands for "Grande." Although the ZG was not sold in the US and was never sold outside Japan, in order for it to be eligible for competition in the US, Nissan sold the nose kit as a dealer's option which is known as the "G-nose". With the nose added, these 240Zs are often referred to as 240ZGs outside of Japan.

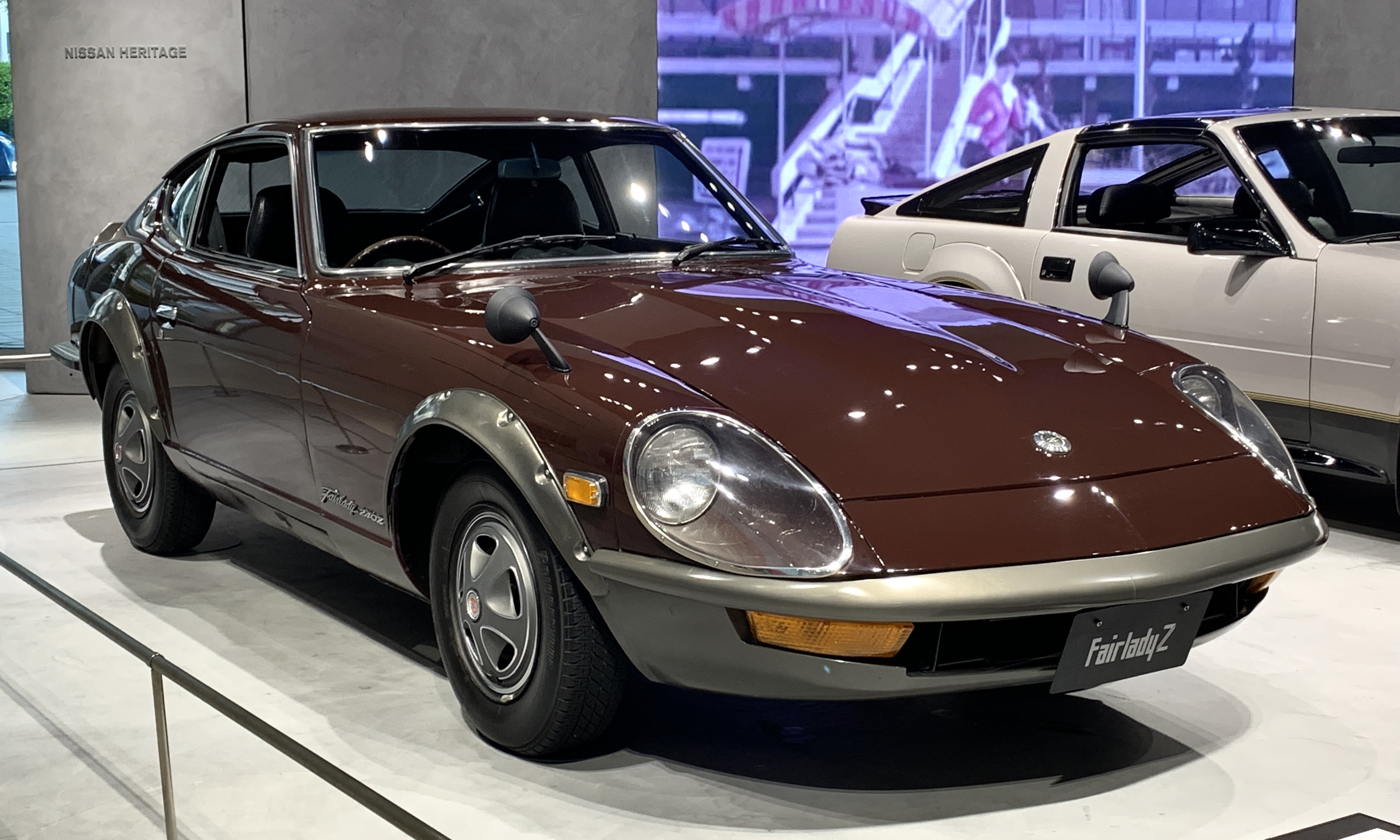
Front

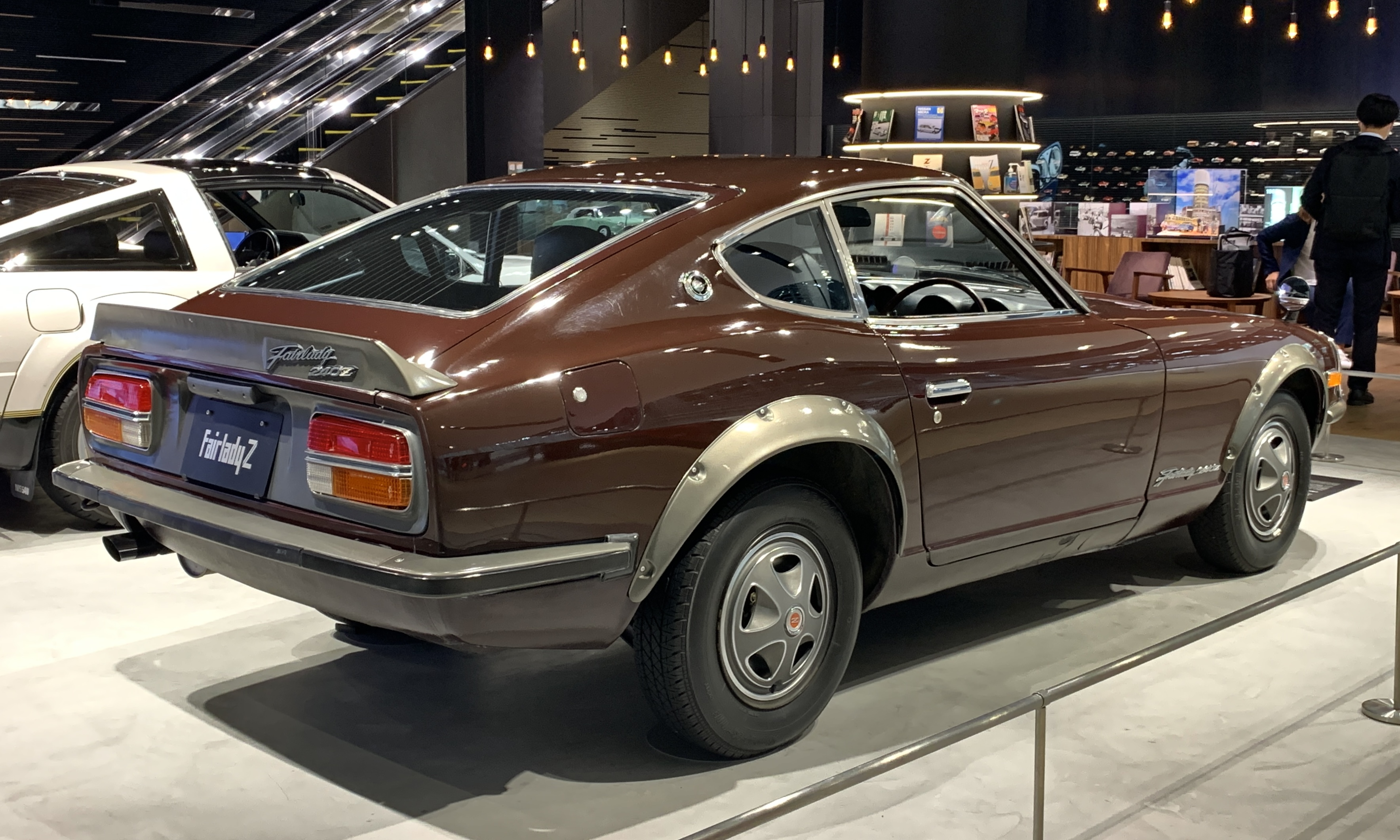
Rear

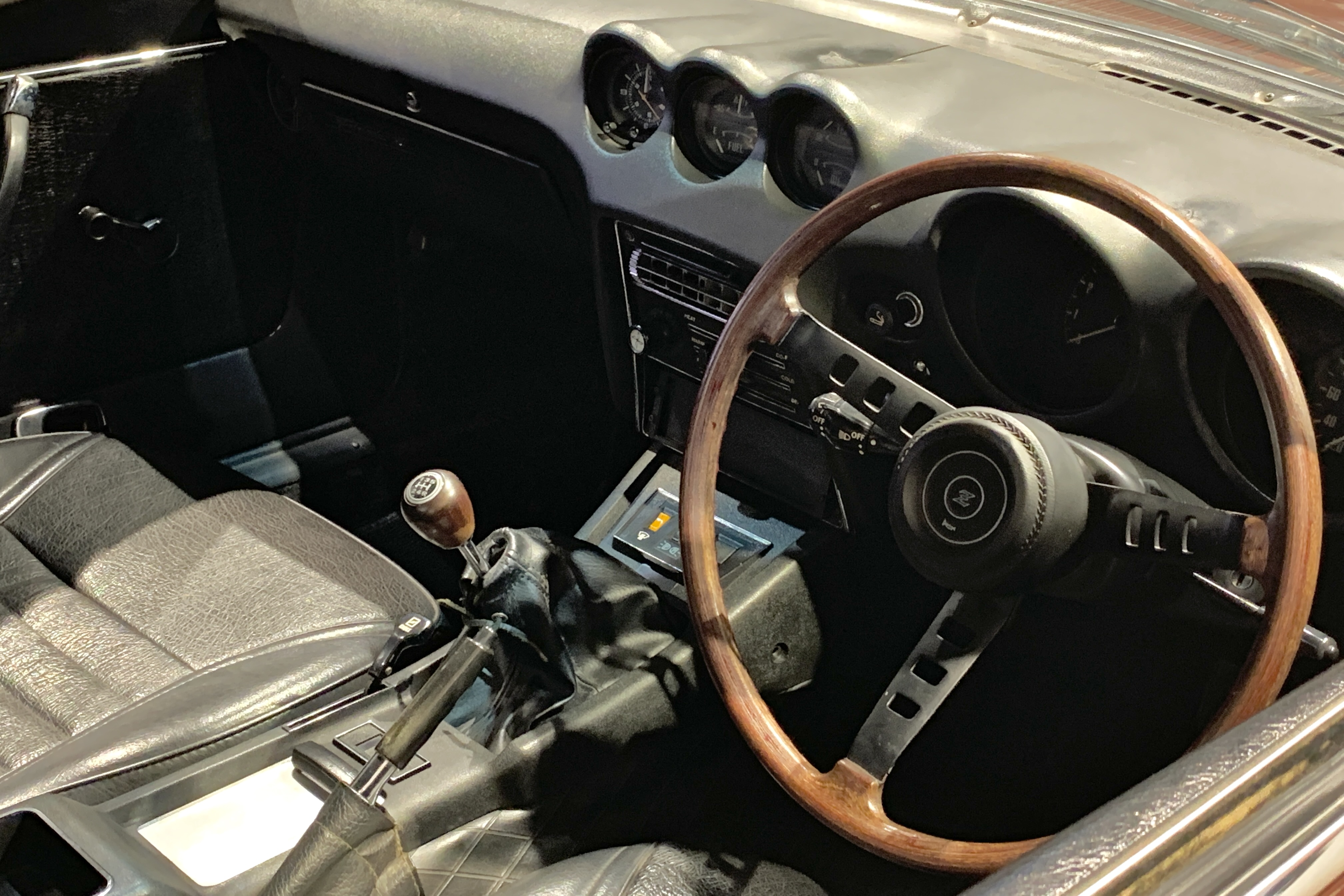
Interior

=== Fairlady Z432 and Z432R ===
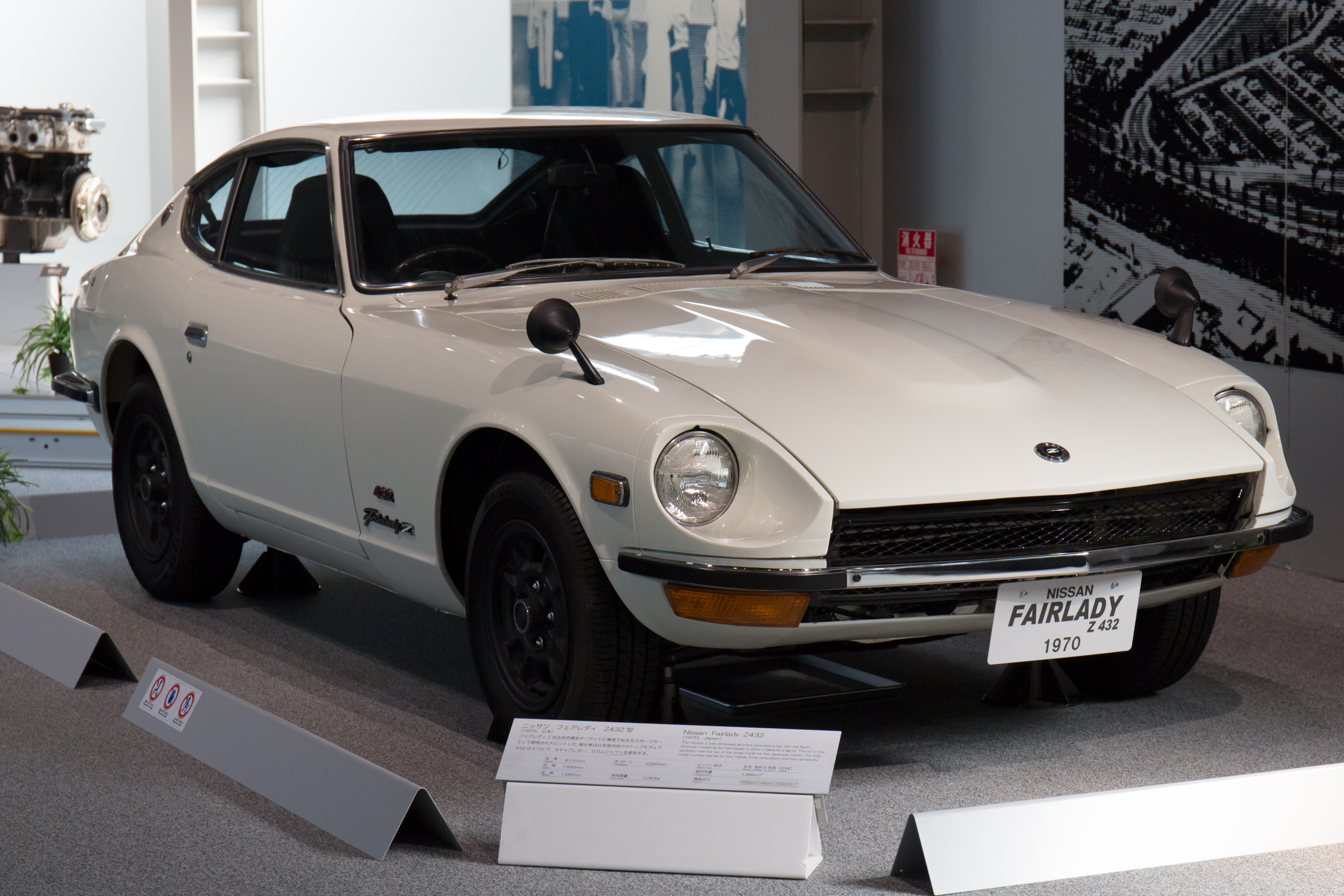
1970 Nissan Fairlady Z432 at the Toyota Automobile Museum

A special Japan-only model Fairlady Z called the Z432 was released, equipped with the twin cam 2.0 L inline six-cylinder "S20" engine used in the Skyline GT-R. This engine, originally designed by former engineers of the Prince Motor Company, produced 160 PS JIS (118 kW; 158 hp). The "Z432" name refers to 4 valves per cylinder, 3 Mikuni carburetors, and 2 camshafts. The model code is PS30. Approximately 420 Z432s were built. Some Z432s were used by the police in Japan.

A sub-model of the Z432 was the Z432R homologation special. This version came with the same S20 engine as the Z432, but to reduce weight some parts of the car were stamped from steel 0.2 mm (0.0079 in) thinner than normal, the bonnet was made of fiberglass, and all of the glass except the windscreen was replaced with transparent acrylic, resulting in a 100 kg (220 lb) weight reduction over the Z432. Nearly all of the usual comfort and convenience features were also stripped out of the car, which came without a heater, radio, clock, glovebox, or any sound deadening. Other signs of its racing intent were the lack of an intake airbox or brake booster, and the installation of a 100 L (22 imp gal; 26 US gal) fuel tank that required deleting the rear spare wheel well.

The Z432R were all painted orange with black aluminum wheels and a low luster black hood. Fewer than 50 Z432Rs are thought to have been built.

In January 2020 a 1970 Z432R sold at auction in Japan for a record A$1.17 million, about US$837,000.

== 240Z ==
Datsun 240Z
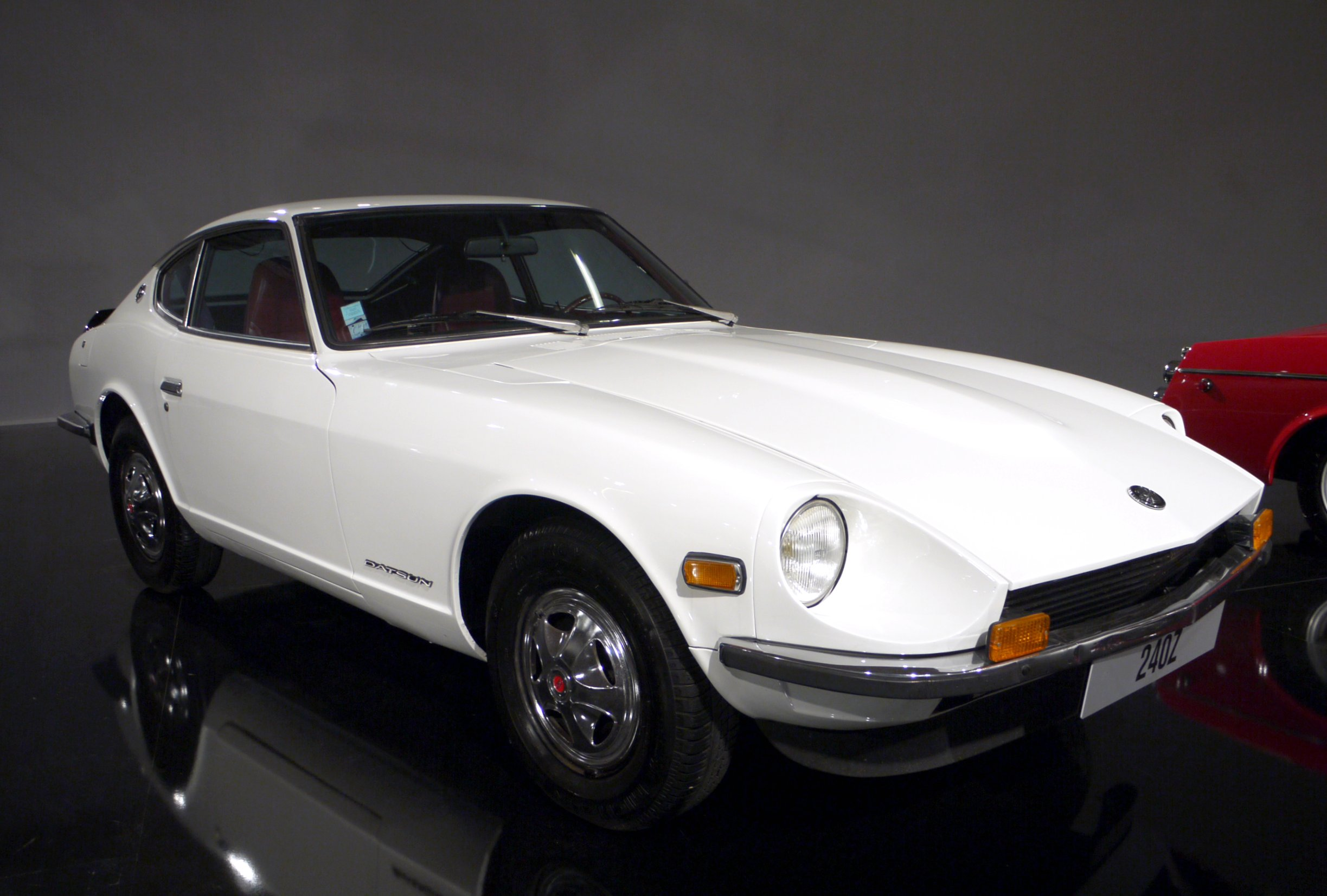
- Datsun 240Z

Overview
- Production: 1969–1973

Body and chassis
- Body style: 3-door coupé

Powertrain
- Engine: 2.4 L L24 I6
- Transmission: 3-speed automatic (1971 on); 4-speed manual; 5-speed manual (non US ver.)

Dimensions
- Wheelbase: 2,305 mm (90.7 in)
- Length: 4,140 mm (163.0 in)
- Width: 1,630 mm (64.2 in)
- Height: 1,283 mm (50.5 in)
- Curb weight: 1,044 kg (2,302 lb)

Chronology
- Successor: Datsun 260Z

The 1970 240Z was introduced to the American market by Yutaka Katayama, president of Nissan Motors USA operations, widely known as "Mister K". The early cars from 1969 to mid-1971 had some subtle differences compared to late-71 to 1973 cars. The most visible difference is: these early cars had a chrome 240Z badge on the sail pillar, and two horizontal vents in the rear hatch below the glass molding providing flow through ventilation. In mid-1971, there were production changes, including exterior and interior colors, was restyling of the sail pillar emblems were with just the letter Z placed in a circular vented emblem, and the vents were eliminated from the hatch panel of the car, due to complaints of exhaust being circulated into the car. Design changes for the US model 240Z occurred throughout production but were not always reflected in the JDM Fairlady if they were specific to federal requirements, including interior modifications for the 1972 model year and a change in the location of the bumper over-riders, as well as the addition of some emission control devices and the adoption of a new style of emissions reducing carburetors for the 1973 model year.

The 1970 models were introduced in October 1969, and received the L24 2.4-liter engine with a manual choke and a four-speed manual. A less common three-speed automatic transmission was optional from 1971 onward, and had a "Nissan full automatic" badge. Most export markets received the car as the "240Z", with slightly differing specifications depending on the various market needs.

In 2004, Sports Car International named this car number two on their list of Top Sports Cars of the 1970s.

=== Specifications ===
- Engine: L24 inline-six, cast iron block, alloy head, two valves per cylinder, seven-bearing crankshaft, Direct Acting OHC; Maximum recommended engine speed 7,000 rpm.
  - Bore × stroke: 83 mm × 73.7 mm (3.27 in × 2.90 in)
  - Displacement: 2.4 L (2,393 cc; 146.0 cu in)
  - Compression ratio: 9.0:1
  - Fuel system: Mechanical fuel pump, twin Hitachi HJG 46W 1.75 in (44 mm) SU-type carburetors
  - Power: 151 hp (153 PS; 113 kW) at 5,600 rpm (SAE gross), 140 PS (103 kW; 138 hp) DIN at 5,600 rpm
  - Torque: 146 lb⋅ft (198 N⋅m) at 4,400 rpm (SAE gross), 19.5 kg⋅m (191 N⋅m; 141 lb⋅ft) at 4,800 rpm (DIN)
- Transmission: Four-speed manual, five-speed manual, or three-speed automatic (after September 1970)
- Final drive ratios:
  - Four-speed manual transmission: 3.364:1 (37:11)
  - Five-speed manual transmission: 3.90:1 (39:10) (not available in the US)
  - Three-speed automatic transmission: 3.545:1 (39:11).
- Brakes:
  - Front: 10.7 in (272 mm) discs
  - Rear: 9.0 in (229 mm) x 1.6 in (41 mm) drums
- Suspension:
  - Front: Independent with MacPherson struts, lower transverse and drag links, coil springs, telescopic dampers, anti-roll bar
  - Rear: Independent with Chapman struts, lower wishbones, coil springs, telescopic dampers
- Steering: Rack and pinion, 2.7 turns lock-to-lock
- Wheels: 4.5J-14 steel wheels with 175SR14 tires
- Top speed: 125 mph (201 km/h)
- 0 to 60 mph (97 km/h): 8.0 seconds
- Typical fuel consumption: 21 mpg_{‑US} (11 L/100 km; 25 mpg_{‑imp})
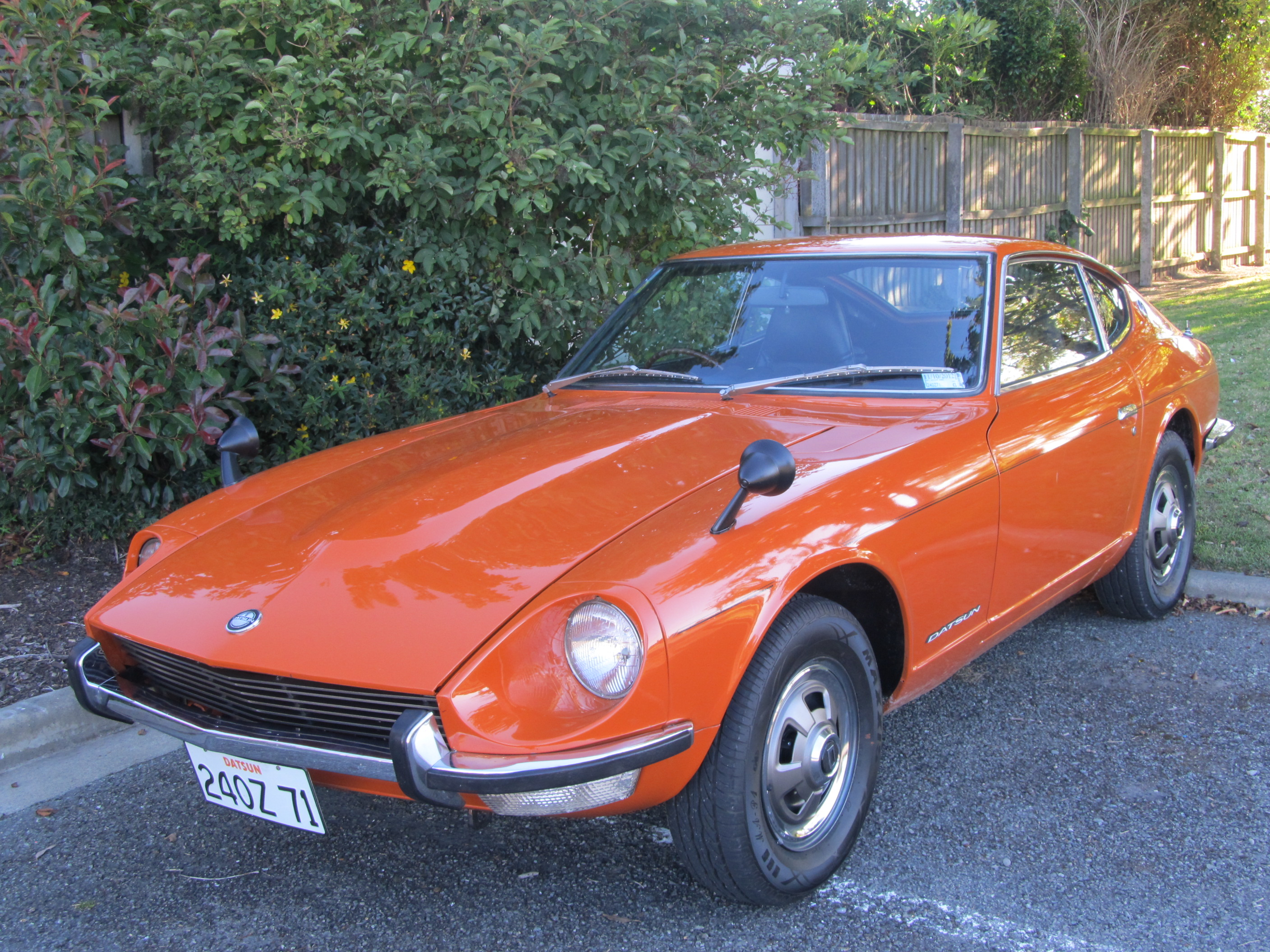
1971 Datsun 240Z

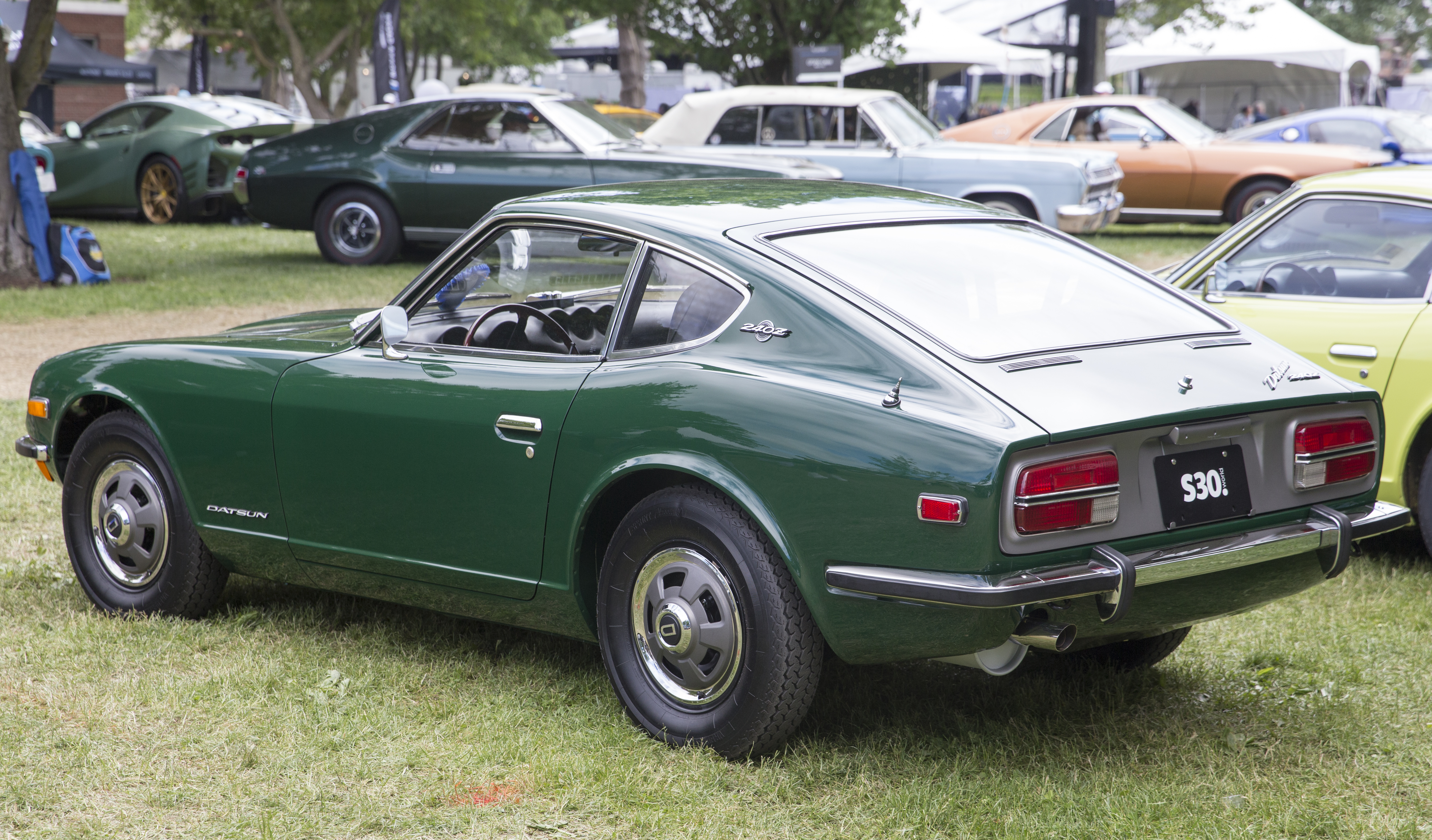
1970–71 Datsun 240Z Series I; rear view (US Model)

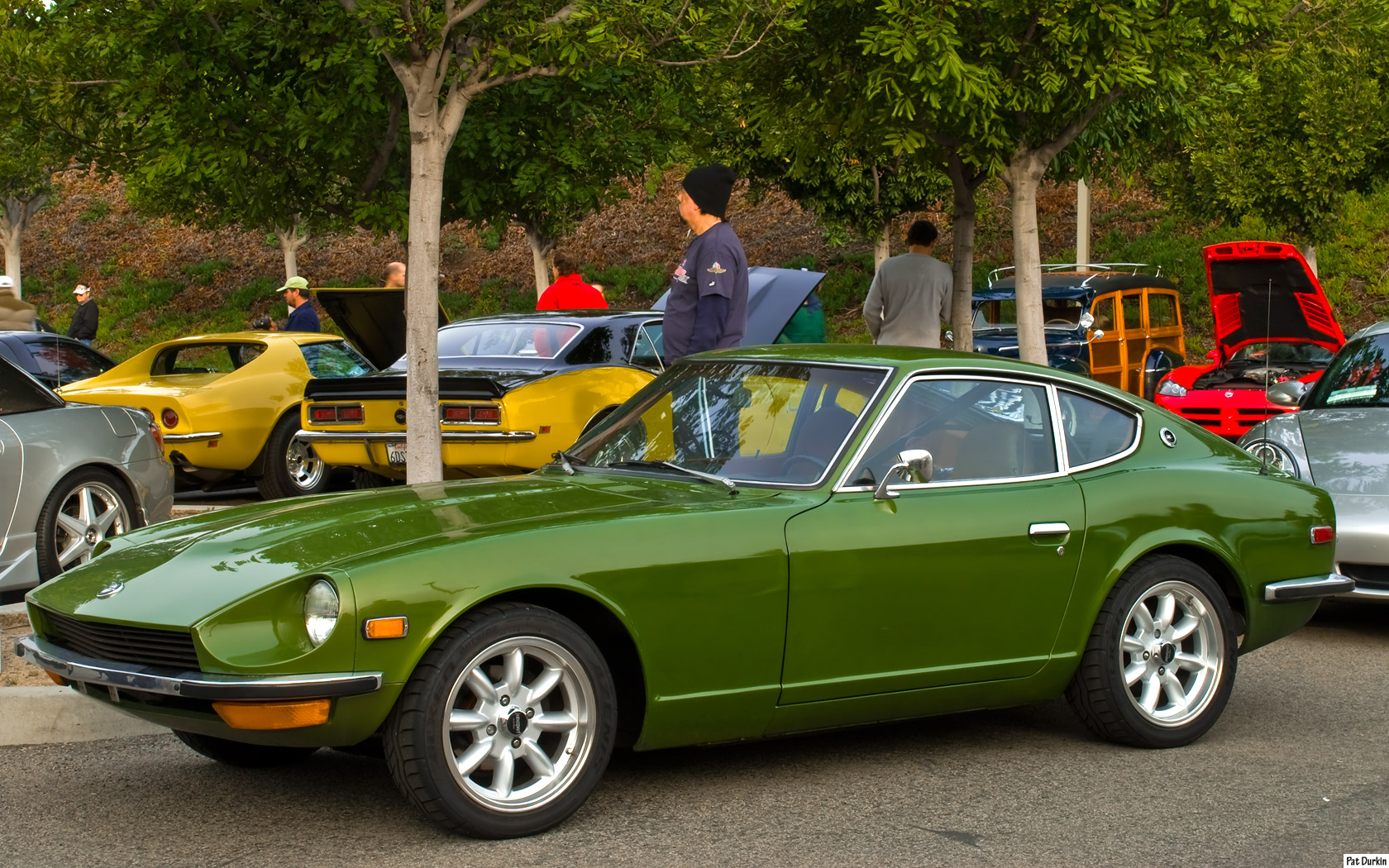
1971.5–72 Datsun 240Z Series II (US Model)

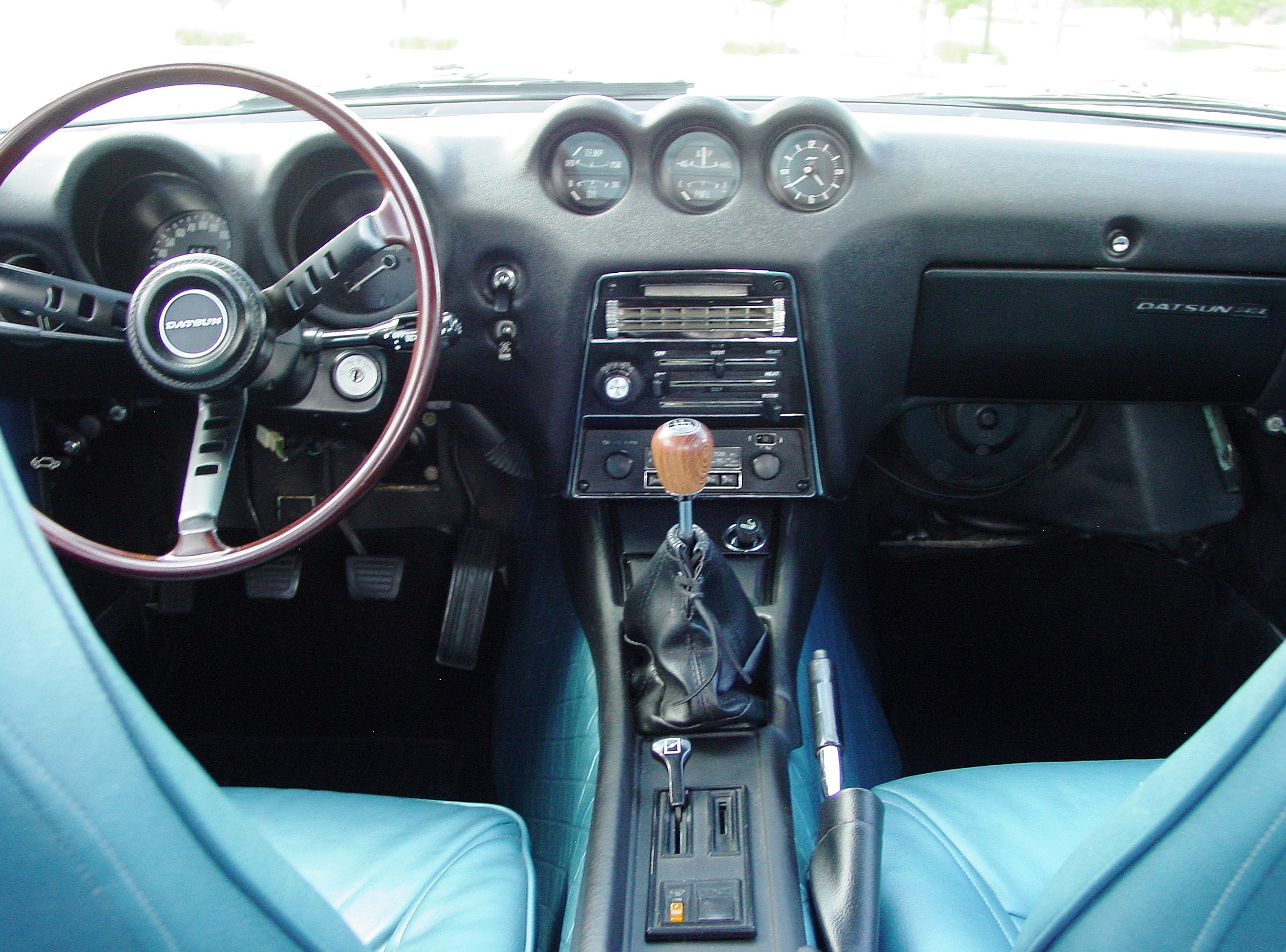
1971 240Z interior; rare blue upholstery

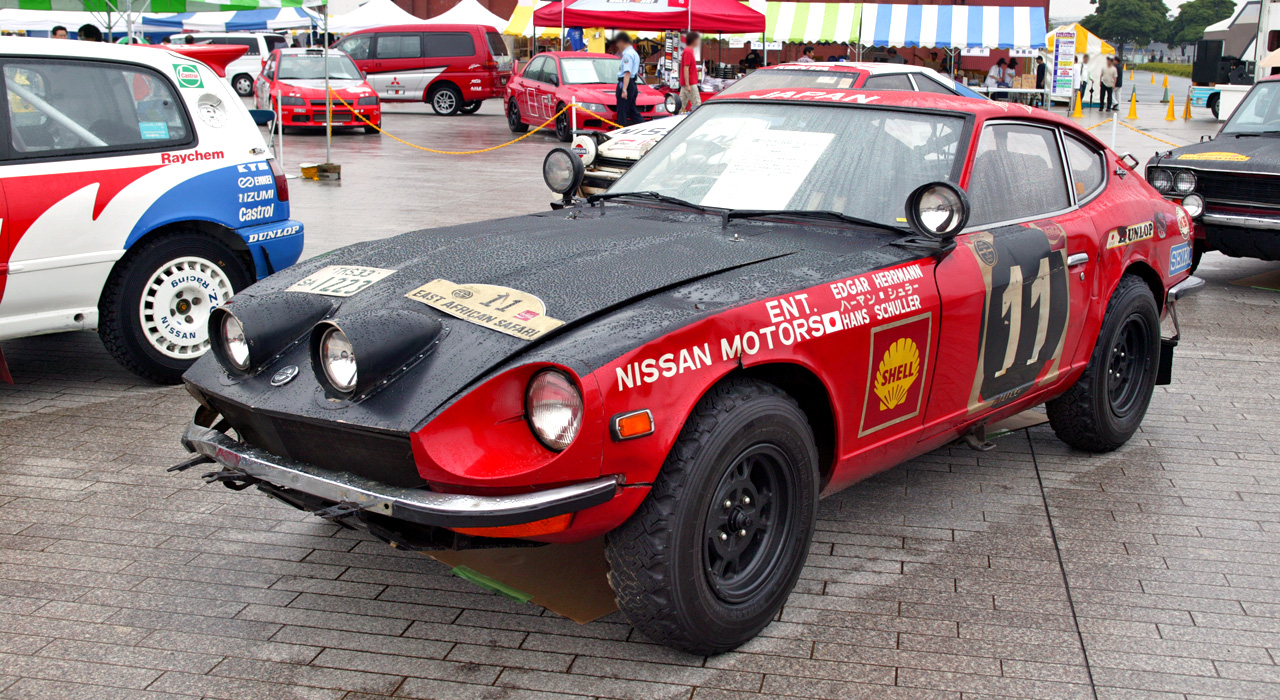
1971 East African Safari rally car

=== World Rally Championship - round victories ===
In 1973, a 240Z, in the hands of Shekhar Mehta, won the 21st East African Safari Rally.

No.	Event	Season	Driver	Co-driver	Car
1	(Kenya) 21st East African Safari Rally	1973	(Kenya) Shekhar Mehta	(Kenya) Lofty Drews	Datsun 240Z

== 260Z ==
Datsun 260Z
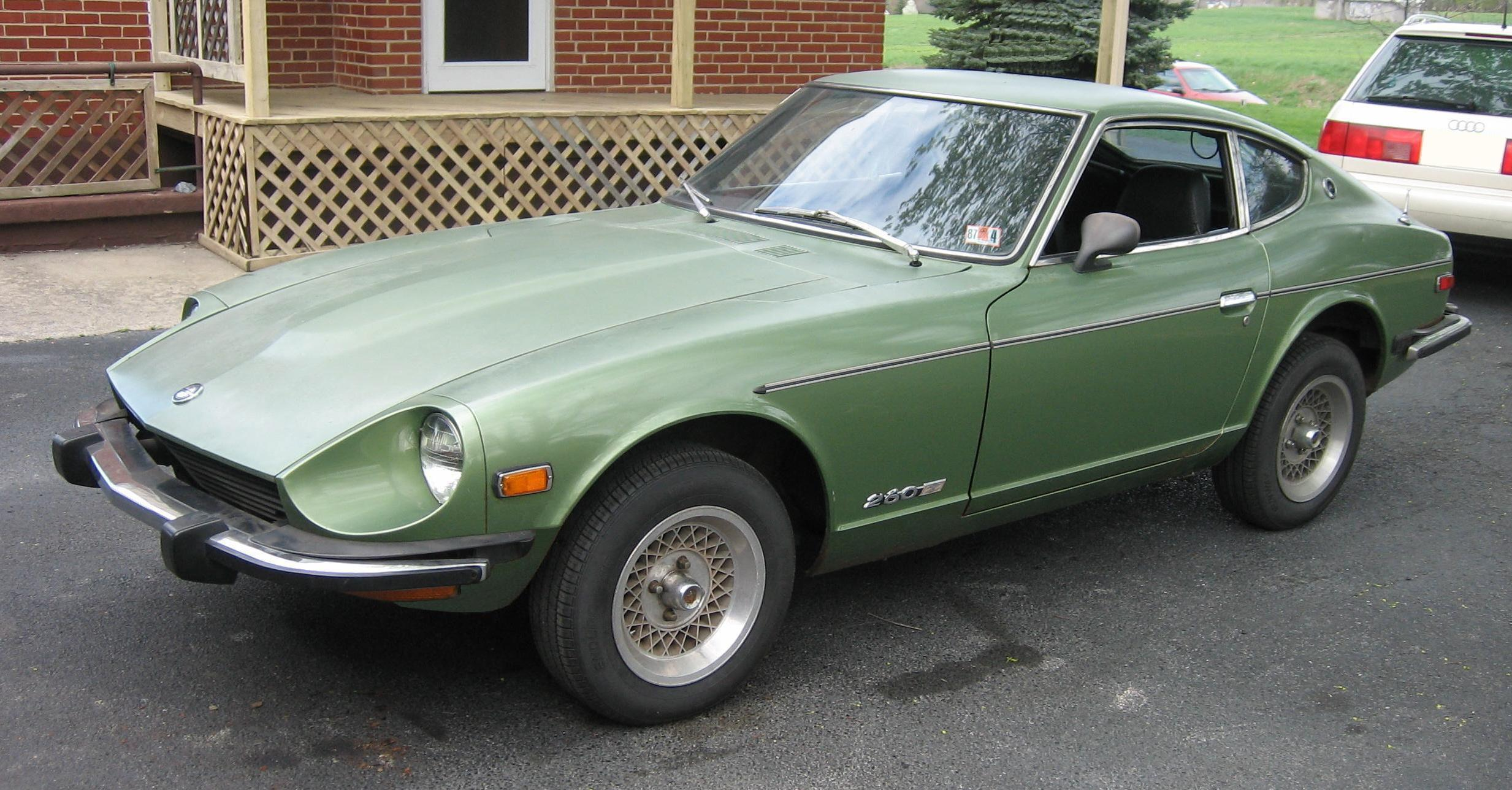
- Datsun 260Z two-seater (US)

Overview
- Production: 1974–1978 (Global); 1974 (US)

Body and chassis
- Body style: 3-door coupé; 3-door 2+2 coupé

Powertrain
- Engine: 2.6 L L26 I6
- Transmission: 4 or 5-speed manual; 3-speed automatic

Dimensions
- Wheelbase: 2,305 mm (90.7 in); 2,605 mm (102.6 in) (2+2)
- Length: 4,140 mm (163.0 in); 4,445 mm (175.0 in) (2+2)
- Width: 1,626 mm (64.0 in)
- Height: 1,285 mm (50.6 in)
- Curb weight: 1,100 kg (2,425.1 lb); 1,200 kg (2,645.5 lb) (2+2)

Chronology
- Predecessor: Datsun 240Z
- Successor: Datsun 280Z

The 260Z was available in the United States for the 1974 model year only, but were sold in most other countries until the 1978 introduction of the 280ZX (aside from Japan, where this model was never regularly available, except in Okinawa).

The engine was enlarged to 2.6 L by lengthening its stroke, bringing with it the new model code RS30. In the US, federal emissions regulations forced a reduction in ignition timing and compression ratio, resulting in a lower power output of 139 hp (104 kW) SAE net for the 260Z despite the additional displacement, whereas in other countries the power output increased to 165 PS (121 kW; 163 bhp). There was also a 1974 1/2 model sold through the second half of 1974 in the US that had the full 165 hp with the addition of the larger 5 mph safety bumpers, that would become the standard for the 280Z.

A four-speed or 5 speed (non-US) manual remained standard equipment, with a three-speed automatic transmission optional.

A 2+2 model built on a 300 mm (11.8 in) longer wheelbase was introduced, with larger opening quarter panel windows and a slightly notched roofline. The 2+2 looked largely identical inside (aside from the rear seat and its associated seat belt reels), but did receive a carpeted transmission tunnel rather than the quilted vinyl material used on the two-seater. The rear side windows on the 2+2 were push-out units, to add ventilation for rear seat occupants.

The 260Z claimed a few updates and improvements over the 240Z. The climate controls were more sensibly laid out and easier to work, and those cars with air conditioning now had the A/C system integrated into the main climate control panel. There was also additional stiffness in the chassis due to a redesign of the chassis rails which were larger and extended further back than previous models. A rear sway bar was added as well. The 260Z debuted a redesigned dashboard and console, as well as new seat trim, and door panels for the interior. The tail lights were updated, moving the back up lights from the main tail light housing to the back panel.

Early 1974 US 260Z models had bumpers that resembled those of the earlier 240Z, though increased slightly in size, pushed away from the body somewhat, and wearing black rubber bumper guards rather that the previous chrome bumper guards with rubber strips. These early cars still had the front turn signals located below the bumpers. Late 1974 U.S. 260Z models (often referred to as 1974.5 models) carried the heavier bumpers that would remain on the 1975-76 model years of the 280Z so as to be in compliance with United States bumper legislation in 1973. These late cars had the front turn signals relocated to the outer edges of the front grille, above the bumper.

=== Specifications ===
- Engine: L26 I6, cast-iron block, alloy head, two valve per cylinder, seven-bearing crankshaft, single overhead camshaft
  - Bore × stroke: 83.0 mm × 79.0 mm (3.3 in × 3.1 in)
  - Displacement: 2.6 L (2,565 cc; 156.5 cu in)
  - Compression ratio: 8.8:1
  - Fuel system: Mechanical fuel pump, twin Hitachi HMB 46W 1.75 in (44 mm) SU-type carburetors
  - Power: 162 hp (121 kW) at 5,600 rpm (SAE gross); 139 hp (104 kW) at 5,200 rpm (SAE net)
  - Torque: 157 lb⋅ft (213 N⋅m) at 4,400 rpm (SAE gross); 137 lb⋅ft (186 N⋅m) at 4,400 rpm (SAE net)
- Transmission: five-speed or four-speed manual or three-speed automatic
- Brakes:
  - Front: 10.7 in (272 mm) discs front
  - Rear: 9.0 in (229 mm) X 1.6 in (41 mm) drums rear, servo assisted
    - Total swept area: 393.7 sq in (2,540 cm^{2})
- Suspension:
  - Front: Independent with MacPherson struts, lower wishbones, coil springs, telescopic dampers, anti-roll bar
  - Rear: Independent with Chapman struts, lower wishbones, coil springs, telescopic dampers
- Steering: rack and pinion, 2.8 turns lock to lock
- Wheels/ tires: 5.5 by 14 in (140 by 360 mm) pressed steel wheels with 195VR14 radial tyres
- Top speed: 127 mph (204 km/h)
- 0 to 60 mph (97 km/h): 8.0 seconds
- Fuel consumption: 20 to 28 mpg_{‑US} (11.8 to 8.4 L/100 km; 24 to 34 mpg_{‑imp})
- Engine oil (sump): 5.1 L (1.1 imp gal; 1.3 US gal)
- Tare weight: 1,295 kg (2,855 lb) (2+2 Automatic)
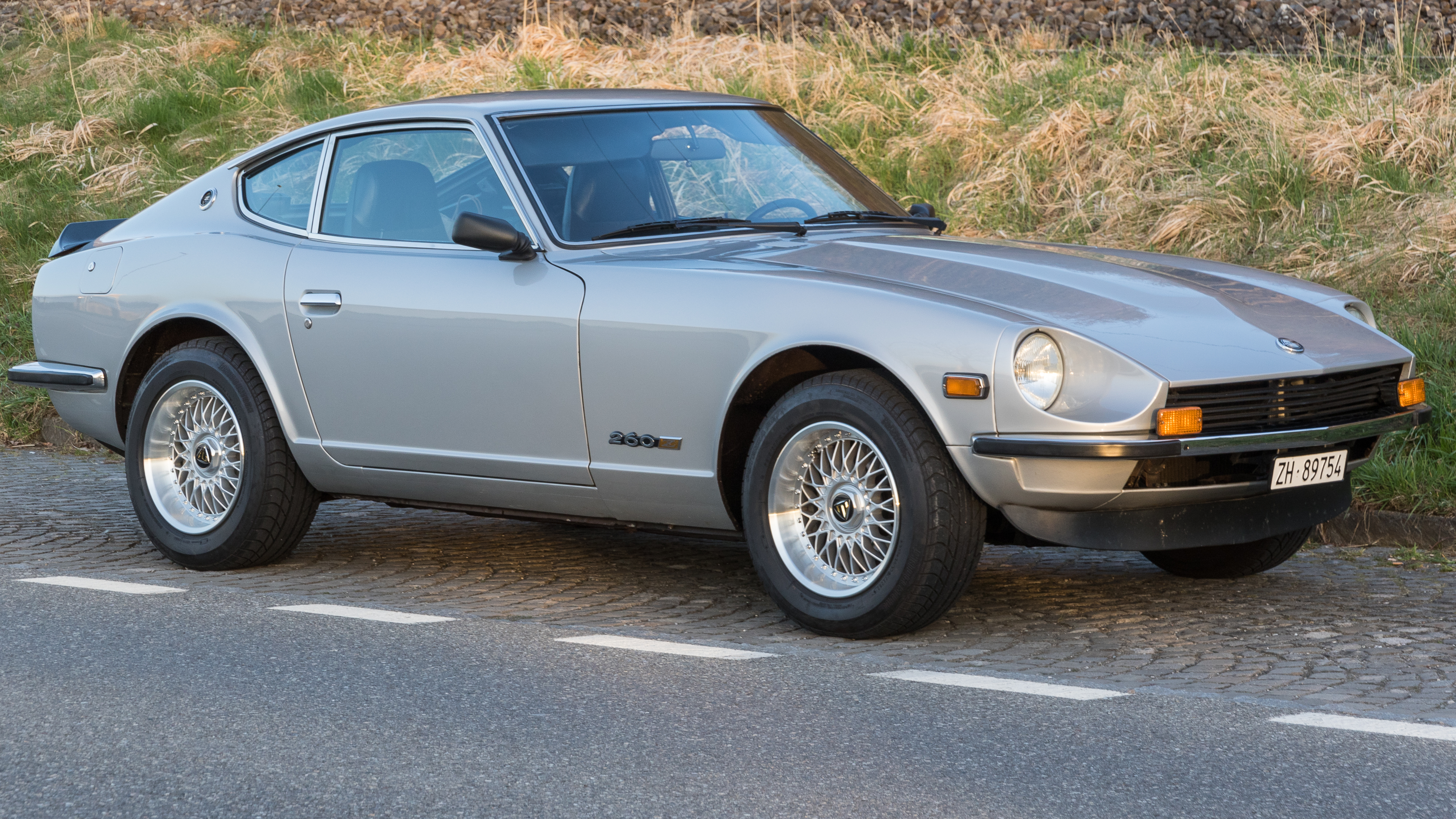
Early 1974 Datsun 260Z two-seater (U.S.)

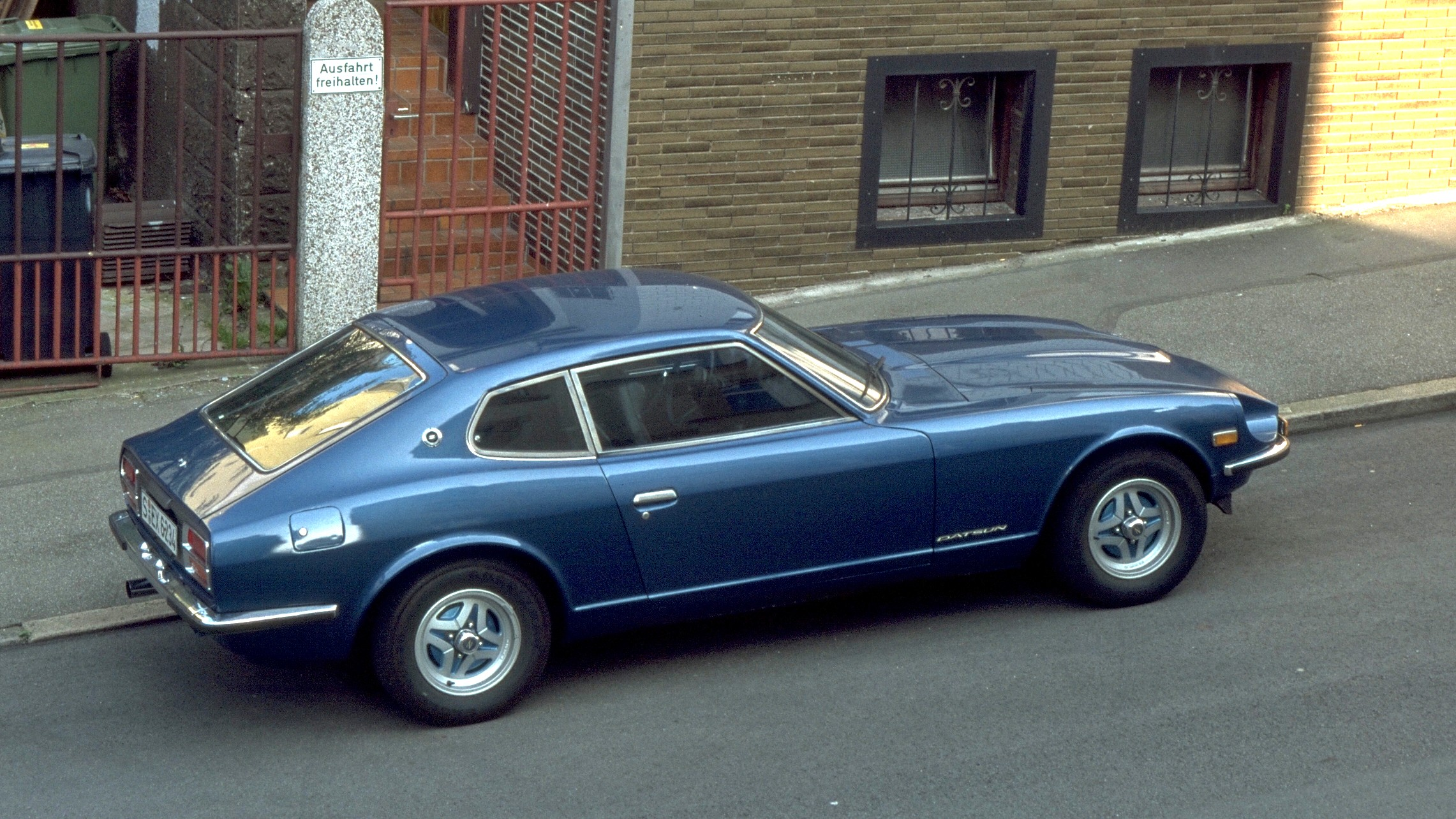
Datsun 260Z 2+2 (Europe)

== 280Z ==
Datsun 280Z
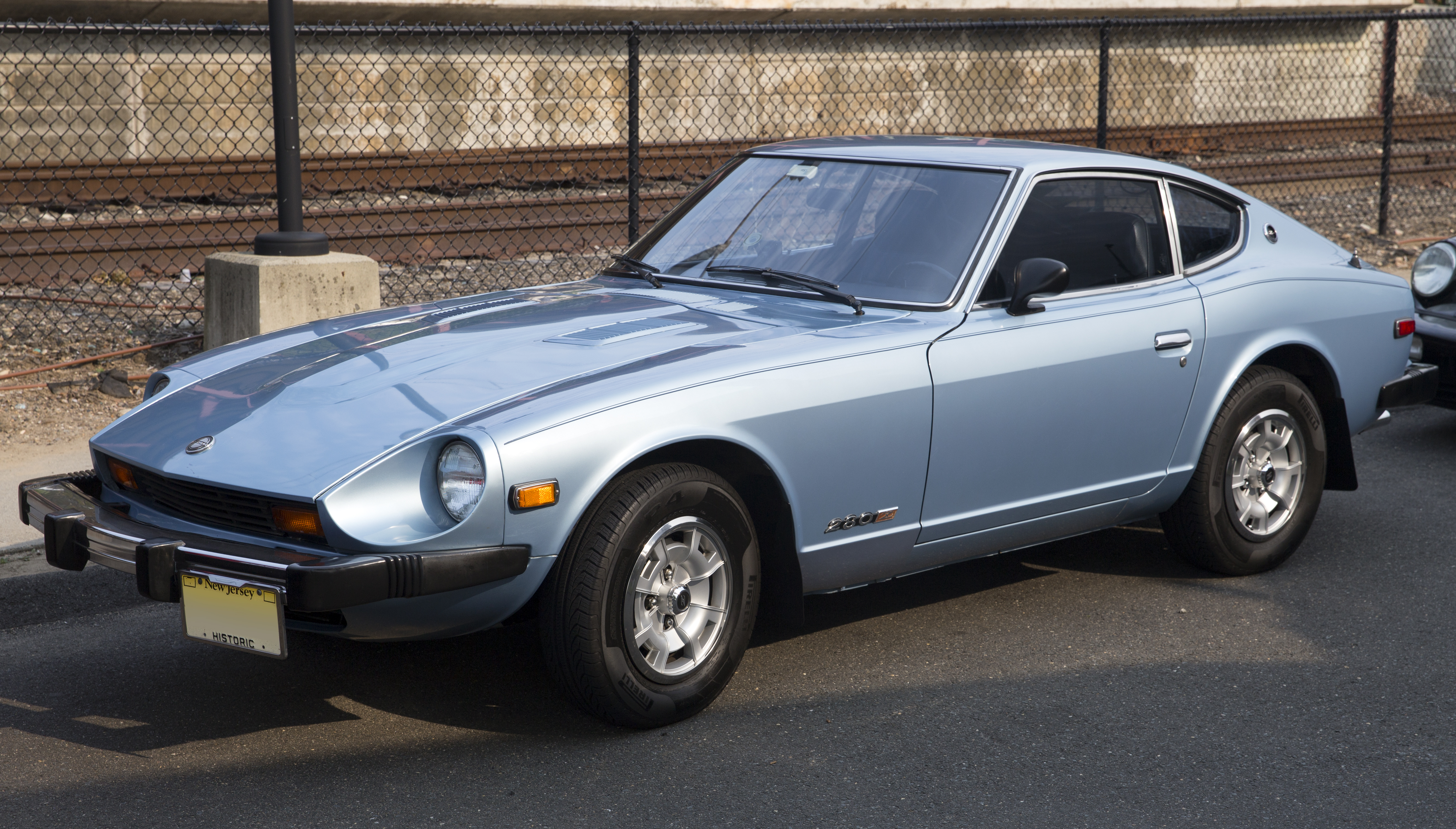
- 1978 Datsun 280Z

Overview
- Production: 1975–1978

Body and chassis
- Body style: 3-door coupé; 3-door 2+2 coupé

Powertrain
- Engine: 2.8 L L28E I6
- Transmission: 4-speed manual; 5-speed manual; 3-speed automatic

Dimensions
- Wheelbase: 2,305 mm (90.7 in); 2,605 mm (102.6 in) (2+2)
- Length: 4,399 mm (173.2 in)
- Width: 1,631 mm (64.2 in)
- Curb weight: 1,304 kg (2,875 lb)

Chronology
- Predecessor: Datsun 260Z
- Successor: Datsun 280ZX

Nissan released the Datsun 280Z model for the North American market in the 1975 model year. In a further effort to keep the S30 models sporting in the face of increasingly stringent U.S. emission and safety requirements, engine size was again increased, this time to 2.8 liters. The L26 engine was bored out 3 mm (0.12 in) to create the L28, and a Bosch L-Jetronic fuel injection system was added. Canadian versions were uniquely equipped without the anti-smog components mandatory in the States. The model code is HS30, the same as for the original 240Z.

The 1975 and 1976 models continued to be fitted with the U.S. federally-required 5 mph (8 km/h) impact absorbing bumpers that had been introduced for the mid-1974 model year of the 260Z. These bumpers were smooth surfaced, and blended into smooth black rubber extensions as they met the body of the car. The 1977 and 1978 models received bumpers with recessed channels added that blended into corrugated- or accordion-style black rubber extension trim. Also new for the 1977 model year, 280Zs no longer received the full-size spare tire, and instead had a "space saver" spare and a larger fuel tank. This resulted in a raised rear deck area made of fiberboard, reducing cargo space. In late 1976 and for most 1977–78 models, an optional five-speed manual transmission was available alongside the four-speed manual and the three-speed automatic options. It included a "5-speed" emblem on the left bottom edge of the rear hatch. For 1977 there was also an update from the charcoal painted hubcap style (with a chrome Z floating in the amber center emblems) to a hubcap that resembled an alloy wheel, bearing a center cap with a chrome Z floating in a black circle.

In 1977 and 1978 respectively, Datsun offered two special edition models. The "Zap" edition was offered in 1977 as a "special decor package". Zap cars were finished in "sunshine yellow" paint, and sported black stripes down the center and sides, with yellow, red, and orange chevrons at the front ends of the stripes. An estimated 1,000 "Zap Z" cars were offered in 1977. The "Zap Z" model was also used as the pace car in the 1977 Long Beach Grand Prix. The Black Pearl edition (produced in 1978) came with black pearlescent paint and a "special appearance package" (SAP), which consisted of dual racing mirrors, rear window louvers, and unique red and silver striping. It has been estimated that each United States dealer was allocated one Black Pearl edition to sell, though due to high demand some dealers reportedly received additional allocation. It is estimated 750 to 1,500 of these cars were ultimately produced, however the exact number remains unknown.

Both the two-seater and 2+2 280Z coupes remained available throughout the 1975–1978 model year run. The S30 series was replaced for 1979 by the Nissan S130.

=== Specifications ===
- Engine: L28E I6, cast-iron block, alloy head, seven-bearing crankshaft, single overhead camshaft
  - Bore × stroke: 86.1 mm × 79.0 mm (3.4 in × 3.1 in)
  - Displacement: 2.8 L (2,753 cc; 168.0 cu in)
  - Compression ratio: 8.3:1
  - Fuel system: electric fuel pump, Bosch L-Jetronic fuel injection
  - Power: 170 hp (127 kW) at 5,600 rpm (SAE gross), 149 hp (111 kW) at 5,600 rpm (SAE net)
  - Torque: 177 lb⋅ft (240 N⋅m) at 4,400 rpm (SAE gross), 163 lb⋅ft (221 N⋅m) at 4,400 rpm (SAE net)
- Transmission: four-speed manual, five-speed manual, three-speed automatic
- Final drive ratio: 3.55:1
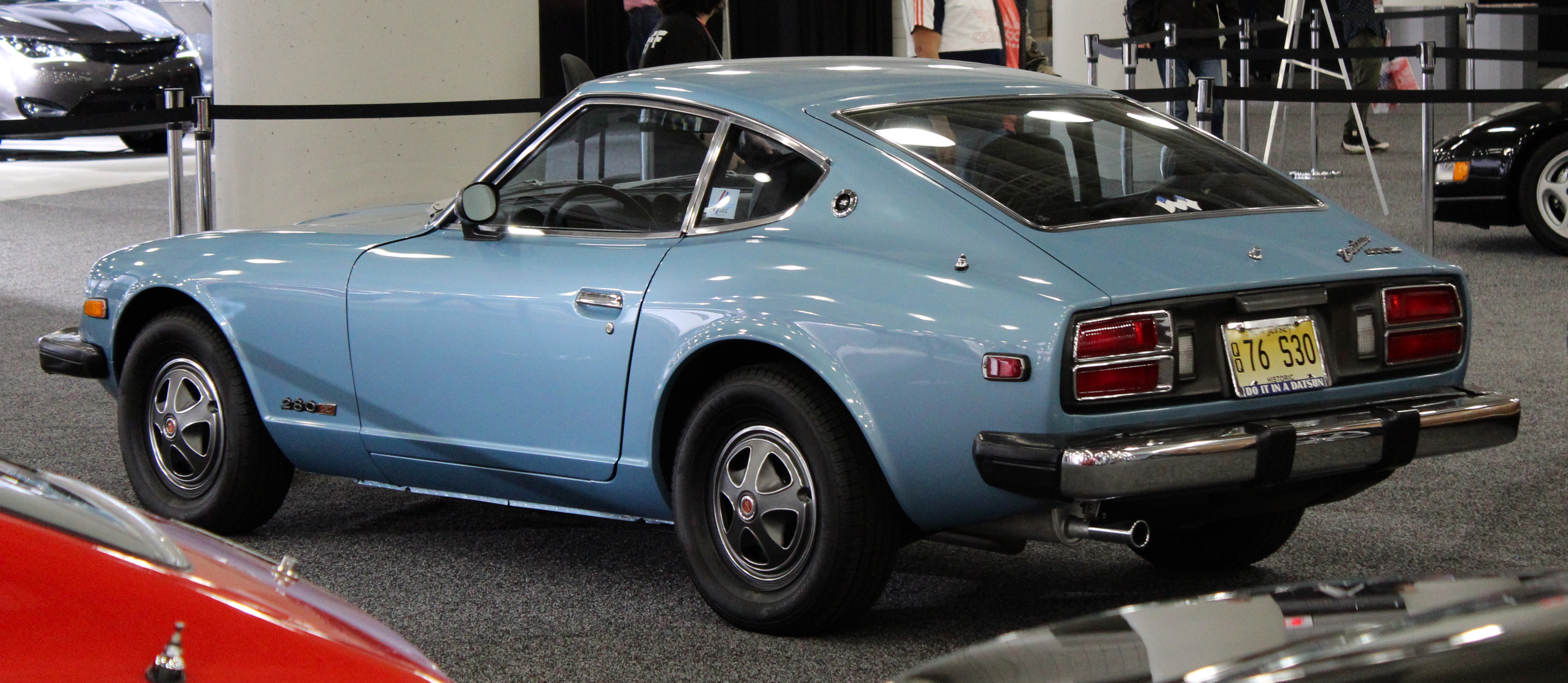
1976 Datsun 280Z rear view

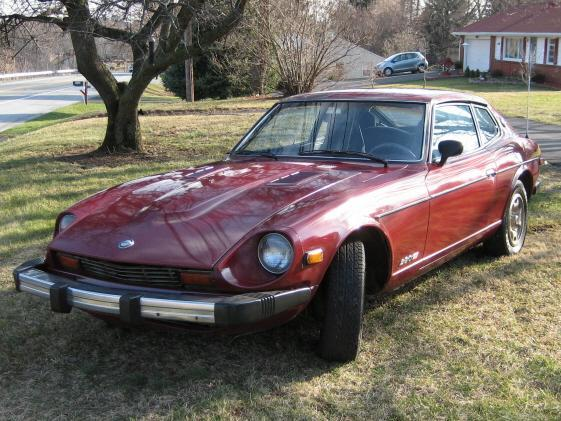
1978 Datsun 280Z 2+2 in color code 611 wine red metallic

== Racing ==
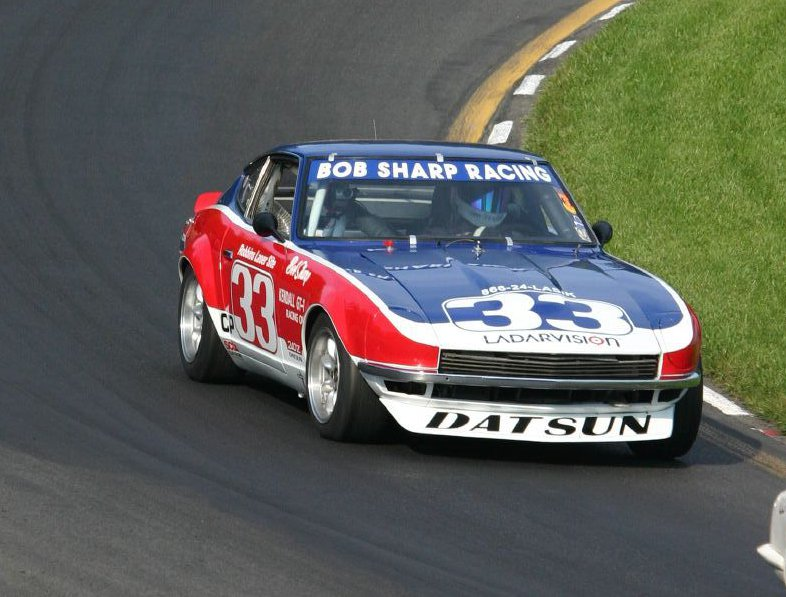
Bob Sharp Racing 1970 Datsun 240Z

The Z was very successful in SCCA racing in the 1970s: Bob Sharp Racing out of Wilton, Connecticut with Sharp, Elliot Forbes-Robinson and later Paul Newman driving; and Brock Racing Enterprises (BRE) in the western US with John Morton driving a #46 240Z to the SCCA C Production national title in 1970 and 1971. Other drivers, such as Clearwater, Florida (and later Maryland) racer Don Kearney had much success with the Z-car between 1970 and 1978. The Z and Datsun 510 are credited as catalyst for the US Japanese import performance parts industry. Nissan also supported and was associated with Bob Bondurant's race driving school from its inception.

In 2013 Nissan claimed its 97th SCCA national championship victory with Greg Ira at the wheel of his orange RevTech-sponsored 240Z. On his way to his championship Ira set several road course records in SCCA's E Production class, beginning in 2006, including:

- Daytona International Speedway, Florida
- Heartland Park, Kansas
- Homestead-Miami Speedway, Florida
- Palm Beach International Raceway, Florida
- Road America, Wisconsin
- Sebring International Raceway, Florida
- Virginia International Raceway, Virginia

Ira was awarded SCCA's prestigious Kimberly Cup in 2008. Previous Kimberly Cup recipients include Bob Holbert, Roger Penske, Mark Donohue, and Peter Revson.

On September 27, 2015, Greg Ira won his second (and Nissan's 98th) SCCA National Championship, in his EP2 Revtech/Ztrix.com 240Z, at Daytona International Speedway.

== Relaunch attempts ==
From 1997 to 2002 Nissan did not offer the Z-car line outside of Japan, where the Fairlady Z (Z32) remained available until 2000. In 1998, Nissan launched a program to bring back the Z-car line by first purchasing original 240Zs, then restoring them to factory specifications, and finally selling them to dealerships for $24,000. This was an effort to keep Z-car interest alive. Nissan over-estimated the market for the cars; low demand coupled with a high price meant that less than fifty cars were re-manufactured and sold. Furthermore, in 1999, a concept car was shown to the public in a plan to return to the fundamentals that made the 240Z a market success. As of 2022, the Z-car is simply sold as the Z. Its design stems from multiple Z's that came before it.

== See also ==
- Datsun Sports
- Nissan L engine
- Nissan Z-car
- Yutaka Katayama
- Shakotan Boogie (anime and manga series)
- Wangan Midnight (anime and manga series)
