= Parallelogram steering linkage =

A parallelogram steering linkage is called such because like its namesake, the two sides of the linkage run parallel to each other and are equal in distance. This type of steering linkage uses four tie rods, one inner and one outer on each side (left and right) that are connected by an adjustment sleeve, a center link (which runs between the tie rods), an idler arm on the passenger side, and a pitman arm on the driver side. The pitman arm attaches to the steering gear output shaft which is also commonly called the pitman shaft. The pitman arm attaches to the center link and is moved by turning the steering wheel. The center link bar transfers the movement from the pitman arm and pitman shaft to the idler arm on the passenger side. The inner tie rods are mounted to the center link and transfer steering motion to the steering arms and outer tie rods. All of the joints which mount these components are constructed of small ball and socket joints to provide the necessary freedom of movement required to maintain control over the vehicle while it is in motion. The most common type of steering is the parallelogram. The cross-steer and Haltenberger linkage designs are used on some trucks and vans.

== See also ==
- Idler arm
