= Bobby Pittman =

American presidential advisor

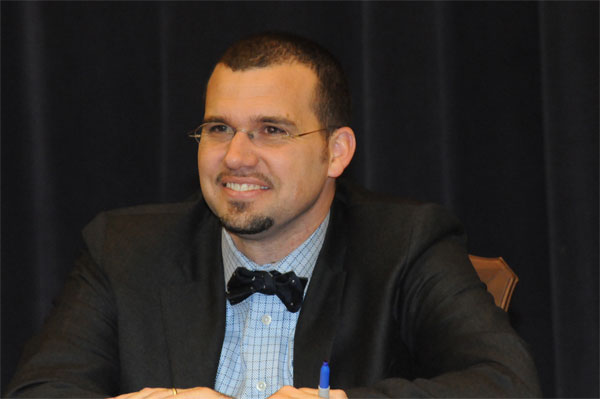
Special Assistant to the President for African Affairs Bobby Pittman attends briefing at the State Department for the African diplomatic corps on February 27, 2008.

Bobby J. Pittman Jr. is an American economist who served as the Special Assistant to President George W. Bush and Senior Director for African Affairs at White House from 2006 to 2009. In that capacity, he was the lead advisor to National Security Advisor Stephen Hadley and President Bush on Africa issues. He also served as the President's Africa Personal Representative (APR) to the G8. During his tenure, Pittman was part of a White House team which oversaw the design and execution of key initiatives such as the Africa Financial Sector Initiative, President's Malaria Initiative (PMI), President's Emergency Plan for AIDS Relief (PEPFAR), Africa Education Initiative, and Millennium Challenge Account (MCA).

== Education ==
Pittman graduated summa cum laude from Florida State University with a Bachelor of Science; he studied economics, computer science, and mathematics. He received a Master of Arts in economics from the University of Chicago, where he also did doctoral work in applied economics.

== Career ==
Pittman began his career as an analyst with the Central Intelligence Agency. In 2002, he was appointed as Director for African Affairs at the National Security Council. In this position, he helped plan and advise the White House on the 2003 U.S. intervention in Liberia, was a member of the working group that designed the Millennium Challenge Account initiative and assisted in organizing the U.S.-Africa Trade and Economic Cooperation Forum (African Growth and Opportunity Act Forum).

Pittman then served as Deputy Assistant Secretary for International Development Finance and Debt at the Department of the Treasury, where he was a key architect and the lead U.S. negotiator of the 100 percent debt relief proposal endorsed by the G8 at the Gleneagles Summit in July 2005. To date, this effort has delivered more than $40 billion in debt stock cancellation for the world’s poorest countries. He also acted as lead representative of the U.S. government for the multi-billion dollar replenishment negotiations of the World Bank, African Development Bank and Asian Development Bank in 2004-2005.

After leaving the White House in 2009, Pittman was appointed Vice President of Infrastructure, Private Sector and Regional Integration at the African Development Bank. In this post he manages one of the largest portfolios in Africa, including more than $25 billion in active projects across 52 African countries.

== Other activities ==
- Center for Global Development (CGD), Member of the Board of Directors
