= Pittman (surname) =

Pittman is a surname. Notable people with the surname include:

== Politics ==
- Anastasia Pittman (born 1970), Oklahoma politician
- Bobby J. Pittman, American politician, former Special Assistant to the President (2006–2009)
- Charles Pittman (politician), former Mississippi state senator
- Joe Pittman (politician) (born 1976 or 1977), Pennsylvania politician
- Key Pittman (1872–1940), United States Senator from Nevada
- Vail M. Pittman (1880–1964), governor of Nevada

== Sports ==
- Anthony Pittman (born 1996), American football player
- Antonio Pittman (born 1985), American football running back
- Cedric Pittman (born 1977), American football player
- Charles Pittman (basketball) (born 1958), retired American basketball player
- Charlie Pittman (born 1948), former American football player
- Chase Pittman (born 1983), American football defensive end
- Craig Pittman (born 1959), professional wrestler under the name of Sgt. Craig "Pitbull" Pittman
- Danny Pittman (born 1958), American football player
- David Pittman (born 1969), former Australian rules baller
- David Pittman (football player), (born 1983), American football cornerback
- Dexter Pittman (born 1988), American basketball player
- Emma Pittman (born 1992), Australian rules and association footballer
- Jamiyus Pittman (born 1994), American football player
- Jana Pittman (born 1982), birth name of Jana Rawlinson, Australian athlete
- Jon-Paul Pittman (born 1986), American-born English footballer
- Josh Pittman (born 1976), American basketball player
- Michael Pittman (born 1975), American football fullback
- Michael Pittman Jr. (born 1997), American college football wide receiver
- Shawn Pittman (rugby union) (born 1988), American rugby player
- Steve Pittman (born 1967), American soccer player

== Other ==
- Aaron Pittman, fictional character in the American TV series Revolution
- Al Pittman (1940–2001), Canadian poet and playwright
- Alice Locke Pittman (1868-1936), American composer
- Booker Pittman (1909–1969), American jazz clarinetist
- Brian Pittman (born 1980), American bassist for Relient K
- Christopher Pittman (born 1989), American pre-teen convicted of murdering his grandparents in 2001
- Eliana Pittman (born 1945), Brazilian singer and actress
- Frank Pittman (1935–2012), American psychiatrist and author
- Gene "Birdlegg" Pittman (born 1947), American blues harmonicist, singer and songwriter
- Sir Isaac Pitman (1813–1897), British teacher and stenography system developer (Pittman Shorthand)
- John Pittman (judge), Rhodesian and Zimbabwean lawyer, politician, and judge
- John A. Pittman (1928–1995), American soldier awarded the Medal of Honor for action during the Korean War
- Josiah Pittman (1816–1886), British organist, composer and music editor
- Montgomery Pittman (1917–1962), American television writer, director, and actor
- Robert W. Pittman (born 1953), American entertainment executive
- Shawn Pittman (musician) (born 1974), American blues rock musician
- Tarea Hall Pittman (1903–1991), American civil rights leader
- William Sidney Pittman (1875–1958), African-American architect
- William Pittman Lett (1819–1892), Irish-Canadian journalist

== See also ==
- Pitman (surname)
