= Pittman =

Pittman may refer to:

== People ==
- Pittman (surname)

== Places ==
- Pittman, Florida, United States
- Pittman Center, Tennessee, United States

== Other uses ==
- The Pittman Act, a United States federal law regarding currency
- The Pittman–Robertson Act, a United States federal law regarding firearms and conservation

== See also ==
- Pitman (disambiguation)
