= Idler arm =

Component of steering

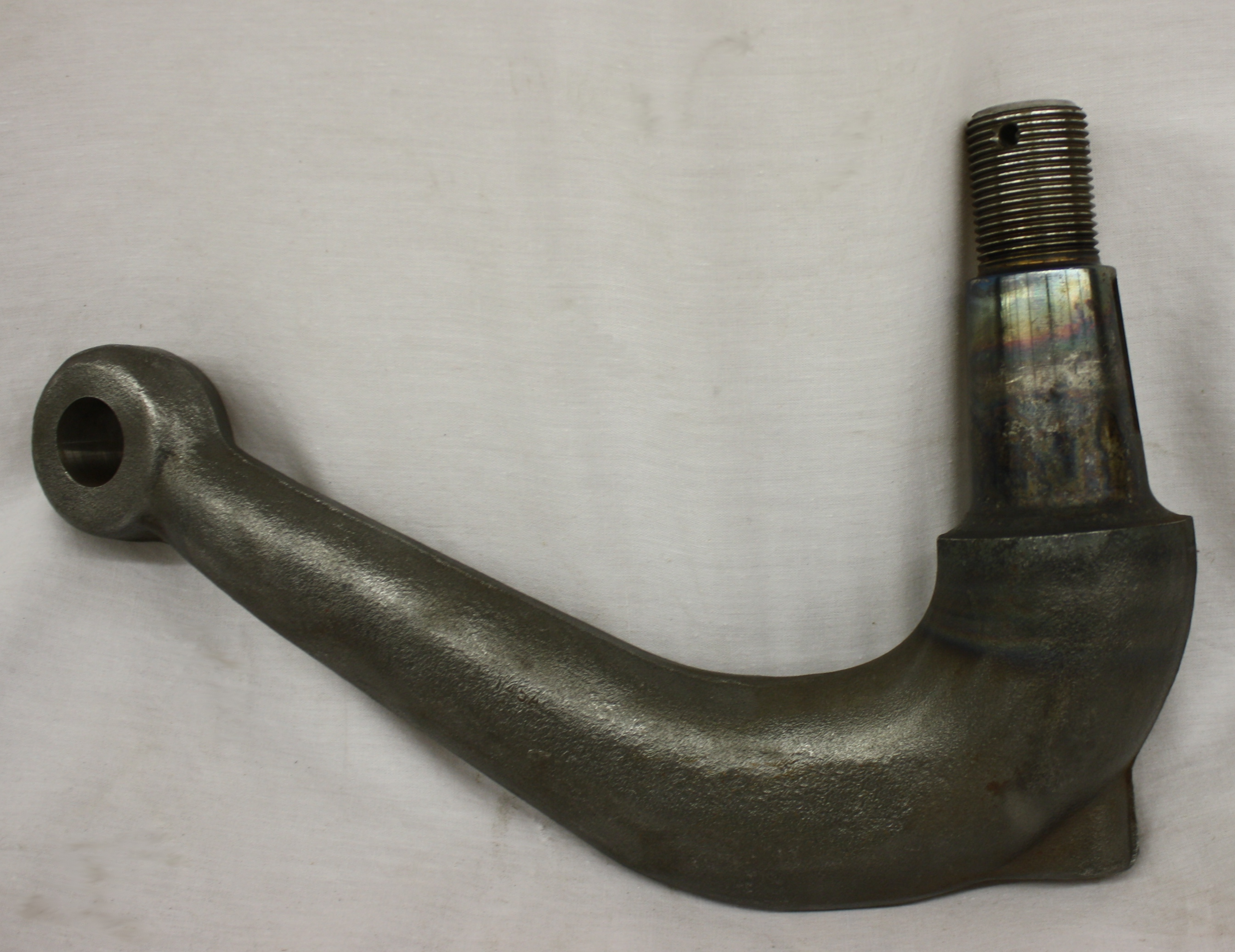
Idler arm for a heavy-duty truck

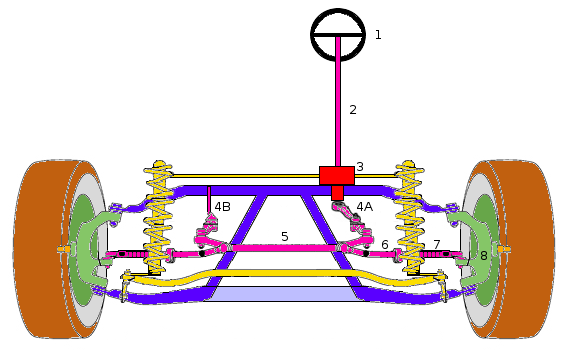
Ackermann steering linkage; the idler arm is shown at 4B

An idler arm is a pivoting support for a conventional parallelogram steering linkage on some cars and trucks.

The idler arm supports the end of the center link on the passenger's side of the vehicle. The idler arm bolts to the vehicle's frame or subframe. Generally, an idler arm is attached between the opposite side of the center link from the Pitman arm and the vehicle's frame to hold the center link at the proper height. Idler arms are generally more vulnerable to wear than Pitman arms because of the pivot function built into them. If the idler arm is fitted with grease fittings, these should be lubricated with a grease gun at each oil change.
