= 2000s in Liberia =

A new civil war began in 1999 when a rebel group backed by the government of neighboring Guinea, the Liberians United for Reconciliation and Democracy (LURD), emerged in northern Liberia. By the spring of 2001, they were posing a major threat to the Taylor government. Liberia was now engaged in a complex three-way conflict with Sierra Leone and the Guinea Republic. By the beginning of 2002, both of these countries were supporting the latest addition to the lexicon of Liberian guerrilla outfits – Liberians United for Reconciliation and Democracy (LURD), while Taylor was supporting various opposition factions in both countries. By supporting Sierra Leonean rebels, Taylor also drew the enmity of the British and Americans.

== Siege of Monrovia ==
In early 2003, a second rebel group, the Movement for Democracy in Liberia (MODEL), emerged in the south, and by the summer of 2003, Taylor's government controlled only a third of the country. Despite some setbacks, by mid-2003 LURD controlled the northern third of the country and was threatening the capital. The capital Monrovia was besieged by LURD, and that group's shelling of the city resulted in the deaths of many civilians. Thousands of people were displaced from their homes as a result of the conflict. By the beginning of August, after a two-month siege, LURD had overrun parts of Monrovia.

== U.S. intervention ==
The United States of America sent a small number of troops to bolster security around their embassy in Monrovia, which had come under attack. The U.S. also stationed a Marine Expeditionary Unit with 2300 Marines offshore while Nigeria sent in peacekeepers as part of an Economic Community of West African States (ECOWAS) force.

On June 4, 2003 in Accra, Ghana, ECOWAS facilitated the inauguration of peace talks among the Government of Liberia, civil society, and the rebel groups called “Liberians United for Reconciliation and Democracy” (LURD) and “Movement for Democracy in Liberia” (MODEL). LURD and MODEL largely represent elements of the former ULIMO-K and ULIMO-J factions that fought Taylor during Liberia's previous civil war (1989–1996). By July 17, 2003 the Government of Liberia, LURD, and MODEL signed a cease-fire that envisioned a comprehensive peace agreement within 30 days. The three combatants subsequently broke that cease-fire repeatedly, which resulted in bitter fighting that eventually reached downtown Monrovia.

Also on June 4, 2003, the Chief Prosecutor of the Special Court for Sierra Leone issued a press statement announcing the opening of a sealed March 7 indictment of Liberian President Charles Taylor for “bearing the greatest responsibility” for atrocities in Sierra Leone since November 1996. On August 11, 2003 under intense U.S. and international pressure, President Taylor resigned on August 11, 2003 as part of a peace agreement and was flown into exile in Nigeria. Vice-President Moses Blah replaced Taylor on an interim basis while a transitional government was being set up.

== Transitional government ==
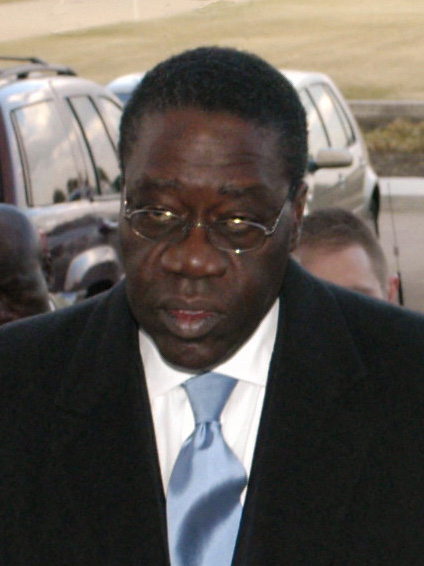
Gyude Bryant

On August 18, leaders from the Liberian Government, the rebels, political parties, and civil society signed a comprehensive peace agreement that laid the framework for constructing a 2-year National Transitional Government of Liberia, effective October 14. On August 21, they selected businessman Charles Gyude Bryant as Chair and Wesley Johnson as Vice Chair of the National Transitional Government of Liberia (NTGL). Under the terms of the agreement the LURD, MODEL, and Government of Liberia each selected 12 members of the 76-member Legislative Assembly (LA). On October 14, Blah handed over power to Charles Gyude Bryant who was appointed Chairman of the transitional government in late 2003.

Because of failures of the Transitional Government in curbing corruption, Liberia signed onto GEMAP a novel anti-corruption program. The primary task of the transitional government was to prepare for fair and peaceful democratic elections. With UNMIL troops safeguarding the peace, Liberia successfully conducted presidential elections in the fall of 2005. Twenty three candidates stood for the October 11, 2005 general election, with the early favorite George Weah, international footballer, UNICEF Goodwill Ambassador and member of the Kru ethnic group expected to dominate the popular vote. No candidate took the required majority in the general election, so that a run-off between the top two vote getters, Weah and Ellen Johnson Sirleaf, was necessary. The November 8, 2005 presidential runoff election was won decisively by Ellen Johnson Sirleaf, a Harvard-trained economist. Both the general election and runoff were marked by peace and order, with thousands of Liberians waiting patiently in the Liberian heat to cast their ballots.

== ECOMIL and UNMIL ==
These changes paved the way for the deployment by ECOWAS of what became a 3,600-strong peacekeeping mission in Liberia (ECOMIL). Since then, the United States has provided limited direct military support and $26 million in logistical assistance to ECOMIL and another $40 million in humanitarian assistance to Liberia.

In October 2003, the UN took over peacekeeping operations from ECOWAS and established the UN Mission in Liberia (UNMIL). In the years that followed, active disarmament, demobilization, and reintegration and rebuilding efforts unfolded

Despite the accord with the rebels, fighting initially continued in parts of the country; tensions among the factions in the national unity government also threatened the peace. By the end of 2004, however, more than 100,000 Liberian fighters had been disarmed, the former government and rebel forces had agreed not to rearm, and the disarmament program was ended. In June 2004, a program to reintegrate the fighters into society began, but by year's end the funds proved inadequate. In light of the progress made, President Bryant requested an end to the UN embargo on Liberian diamonds and timber, but the Security Council postponed such a move until the peace was more secure. Bryant's government was hindered by corruption and a lack of authority in much of Liberia, but the peace enabled to the economy recover somewhat in 2004.

== Liberian elections (2005) ==
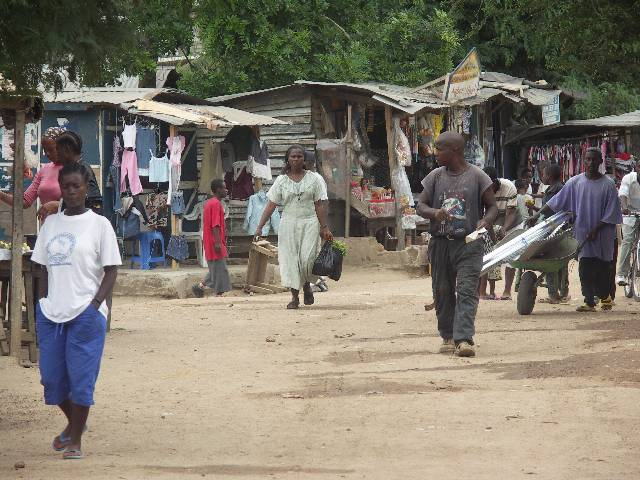
The Buduburam refugee camp west of Accra, Ghana, home in 2005 to more than 40,000 refugees from Liberia

First round presidential elections in October 2005 resulted in a run-off between ex-footballer George Weah and Ellen Johnson Sirleaf, a former World Bank economist and finance minister. Weah proved hugely popular, particularly with the young and won the first round with 28% of the vote. However, his opponents argued Johnson-Sirleaf was better qualified for the job.

The second round of elections took place on November 8, 2005. Johnson-Sirleaf claimed victory of this round, winning 59 per cent of the vote. However, Weah alleged electoral fraud, despite international observers declaring the election to be free and fair. Although Weah was still threatening to take his claims to the Supreme Court if no evidence of fraud was found, Johnson-Sirleaf was declared president on November 23, making her the first woman president of Liberia and indeed of any African country.

== Allegations of labor rights abuses by Firestone ==
A case against Firestone brought by the International Labor Rights Fund states,

The Plantation workers allege, among other things, that they remain trapped by poverty and coercion on a frozen-in-time Plantation operated by Firestone in a manner identical to how the Plantation was operated when it was first opened by Firestone in 1926

Firestone's management rejects these allegations citing that the corporation has provided employment and pensions to thousands of Liberians as well as healthcare. The company also provides education and training opportunities to employees and their children.

In May 2006, the United Nations Mission in Liberia (UNMIL) released a report detailing the state of human rights on Liberia's rubber plantations. According to the report, Firestone managers in Liberia admitted that the company does not effectively monitor its own policy prohibiting child labor. UNMIL found that several factors contribute to the occurrence of child labor on Firestone plantations: pressure to meet company quotas, incentive to support the family financially, and lack of access to basic education. The report also noted that workers' housing provided by Firestone has not been renovated since the houses were constructed in the 1920s and 1930s.

In response to the accusations of child labor and poor housing in the UN report, Dan Adomitis; President of Firestone Natural Rubber Company Liberia; stated:

Well, in addition to the devastation that 15 years of civil war has caused, I think you need to understand another point -- during the 2003 fighting, we had thousands of refugees come to Harbel for the safety that it provided. When those people came, they occupied any open area of land that was available. They put up temporary housing made out of mud, out of bamboo, out of thatch, out of tarpaulin, out of corrugated steel. Anything that they could do to get shelter. And those conditions still exist. They are not Firestone housing, but they are on our property.

We have very strict policies about child labor. We do not hire anybody under 18 years of age, and we discourage parents from bringing their children to the fields with them. We have a program with the Ministry of Labor in Liberia to - and also the union that represents our employees -- to educate parents about why they should not bring children with them into the field. And if we see incidents of this, we will cancel those employees, and if necessary, ultimately discipline them over such issue.

== Extradition and trial of Charles Taylor ==
Under international pressure, Sirleaf requested in March 2006 that Nigeria extradite Charles Taylor, who was then brought before an international tribunal in Sierra Leone to face charges of crimes against humanity, arising from events during the Sierra Leone civil war (his trial was later transferred to The Hague for security purposes). In June 2006, the United Nations ended its embargo on Liberian timber, but continued its diamond embargo until an effective certificate of origin program was established, a decision that was reaffirmed in October.

In March 2007, former interim president Bryant was arrested and charged with having embezzled government funds while in office.

== See also ==
- 2005 in Liberia
