= Steering linkage =

Car part

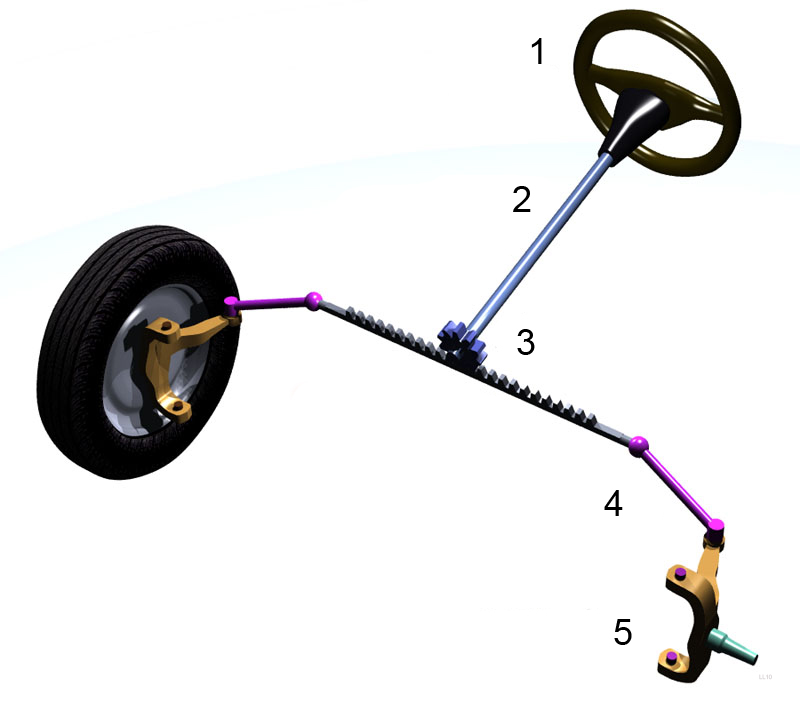
Simplified steering linkage: 1. Steering wheel; 2. Steering column; 3. Rack and pinion; 4. Steering arm; 5. Steering knuckle

A steering linkage is the part of an automotive steering system that connects to the front wheels.

The steering linkage which connects the steering gearbox to the front wheels consists of a number of rods. These rods are connected with a socket arrangement similar to a ball joint, called a tie rod end, allowing the linkage to move back and forth freely so that the steering effort will not interfere with the vehicles up-and-down motion as the wheel moves over roads. The steering gears are attached to a rear rod which moves when the steering wheel is turned. The rear rod is supported at one end.

== Technology ==
Most modern cars have a fully mechanical steering linkage system, but a recent innovation is the steer by wire system.

== See also ==
- Bump steer
- Parallelogram steering linkage
