= Pitman (surname) =

Pitman is a surname. Notable people with the surname include:

- Almira Hollander Pitman (1854-1939), American suffragist
- Andrew Pitman, Australian climate scientist
- Benjamin Pitman, promoter of Pitman's shorthand in the United States
- Benjamin Pitman (Hawaii judge), New England and Hawaiian businessman
- Bill Pitman, American guitarist and session musician
- Charles Pitman (game warden) (1890–1975), British herpetologist and ornithologist
- Charles H. Pitman (1935–2020), American Marine Corps general
- Chris Pitman, synthist for the U.S. band Guns N' Roses
- Brett Pitman, professional footballer for Bournemouth, Bristol City, Ipswich Town and Portsmouth.
- E.J.G. Pitman, statistician noted for the Pitman–Koopman–Darmois theorem concerning exponential families of probability distributions
- Frederick Pitman (publisher) (1828–1886), English publisher and writer
- Frederick Pitman, British Olympic rower
- Frederick I Pitman, British rower and Boat Race umpire (father of Frederick)
- Gayle E. Pitman, American author
- Henry Alfred Pitman (1808–1908), English physician
- Henry Hoʻolulu Pitman (1845–1863), American Civil War soldier of Native Hawaiian ancestry
- Herbert Pitman, third officer on the RMS Titanic
- Isaac Pitman, inventor of Pitman Shorthand
- Jacob Pitman, brother of Isaac, brought shorthand and Swedenborgianism to South Australia
- James Pitman, inventor of the Initial Teaching Alphabet
- Jenny Pitman, British racehorse trainer and author
- Kent Pitman, expert on Lisp programming language
- Marie J. Davis Pitman (1850–1888), American author who used the pen-name "Margery Deane"
- Mary Pitman Ailau, Hawaiian noblewomen
- MC Pitman, East Midlands English rapper
- Primrose Pitman (1902-1998), English artist
- Robert Carter Pitman, 19th century Massachusetts legislator and author
- Rose M. M. Pitman (1868-1947), English illustrator
- Walter Pitman, educator and former politician in Ontario, Canada
- Walter C. Pitman, III, geophysicist and a professor emeritus at Columbia University

== See also ==
- Pittman (surname)
