= Henry Alfred Pitman =

English physician

Sir Henry Alfred Pitman FRCP (1 July 1808, London – 6 November 1908, Enfield) was an English physician, known for his work on reforming medical education.

== Biography ==
After education at schools at Tooting and Ealing and with a tutor at Ware, Hertfordshire Henry Pitman matriculated in 1827 at Trinity College, Cambridge, where he graduated B.A. in 1832. After travelling abroad for a year with a college friend, he spent six months working in the office of his brother-in-law, who was a solicitor. Pitman then studied medicine, working first for a year at Cambridge and then at King's College and at St George's Hospital. He graduated in 1835 M.B. at Cambridge; after passing in 1838 the examination for the medical licence at that university, he proceeded M.D. in 1841. In 1845 he was elected a Fellow of the Royal College of Physicians of London.

In 1842 he was private physician to the Duke of Grafton. At St George's Hospital, Pitman was from 1846 to 1857 assistant physician and lecturer on materia medica and from 1857 to 1866 full physician and lecturer on medicine. In 1866 he became the first consulting physician to St George's Hospital.

Pitman was Registrar of the Royal College of Physicians from 1858 to 1889.

He was responsible for administering the provisions of the new Medical Act affecting the College. In 1869 the first edition of the Nomenclature of Diseases was produced, and the new Diploma of Public Health owed its institution chiefly to his efforts. During his registrarship, the Bradshaw and Milroy Lectures were established and the Baly Medal and Murchison Scholarship came into being. It was Henry Pitman who was the chief instrument in bringing about the Conjoint Board examination; he received the honour of knighthood in 1883 in recognition of this achievement.

He married in 1852; the marriage produced three sons and four daughters. On his hundredth birthday he received a congratulatory telegram from King Edward VII.

A portrait by Ouless hangs in the reading-room of the Royal College of Physicians, to which it was presented on behalf of some of the fellows by Sir Risdon Bennett in 1886.
