= Pitman arm =

Shaft that translates between rotary and linear movement

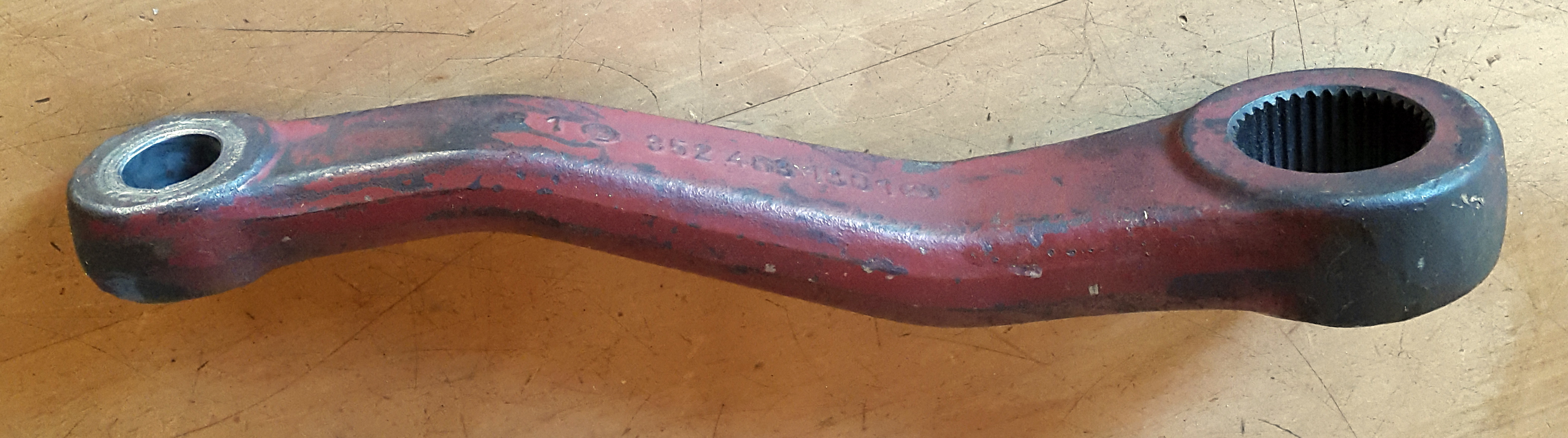
Pitman arm

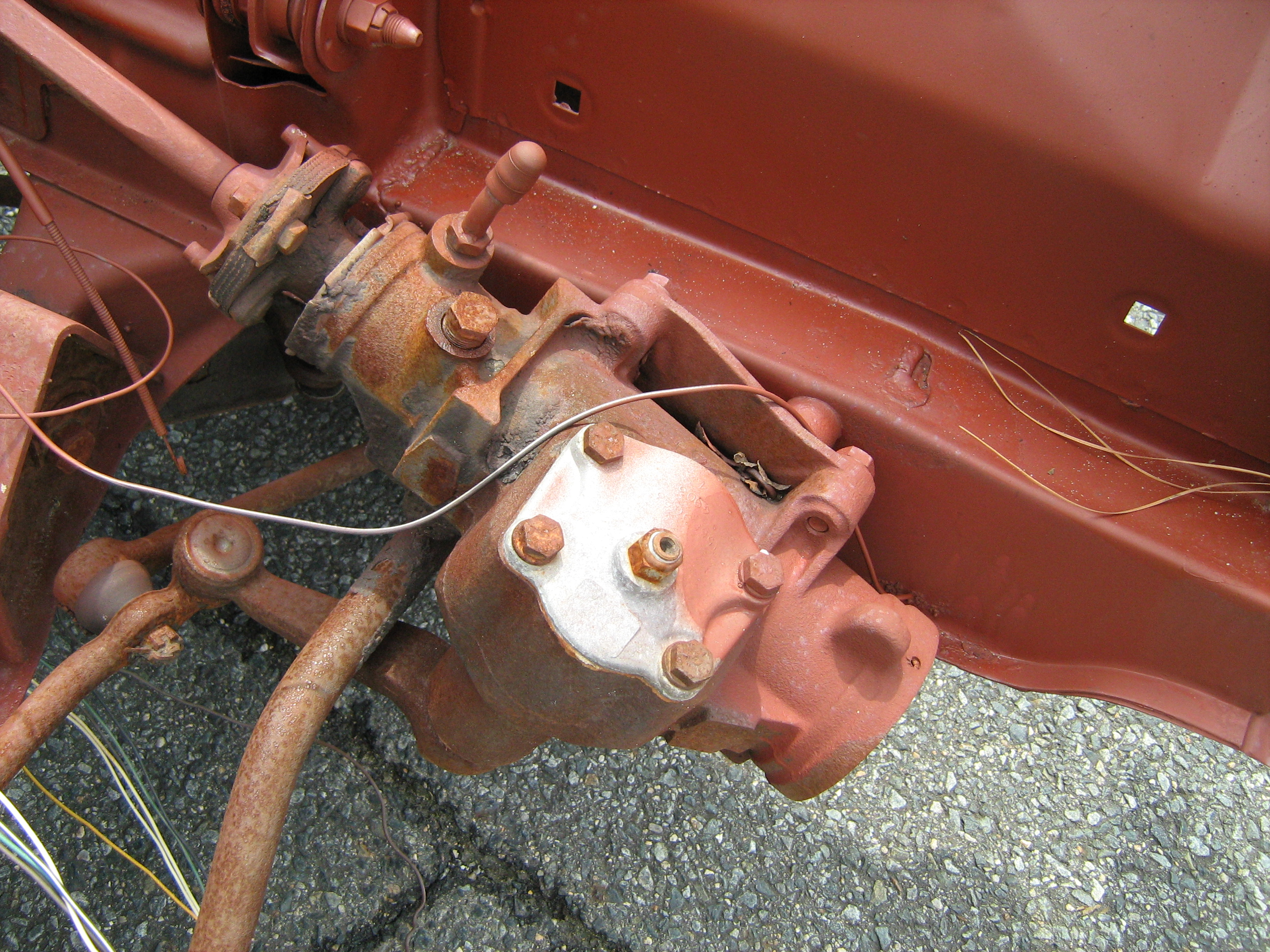
Steering box with the pitman arm visible beneath

A Pitman arm is a shaft that translates rotary or angular movement into linear movement, or vice versa. Pitman arms are commonly found in water pumping windmills, automotive steering systems, and sewing machines.

In windmills, the Pitman arm connects the driving gear to the pumping arm. It translates the rotary power from the wind blades to the up-and-down motion of the pumping arm.

In automotive or truck steering systems, the Pitman arm acts as a linkage attached to the steering box (see recirculating ball) sector shaft, it converts the angular motion of the sector shaft into the linear motion needed to steer the wheels. The arm is supported by the sector shaft and supports the drag link or center link with a ball joint. It transmits the motion it receives from the steering box into the drag (or center) link, causing it to move left or right to turn the wheels in the appropriate direction. The idler arm is attached between the opposite side of the center link from the Pitman arm and the vehicle's frame to hold the center or drag link at the proper height.

"Pitman arm" can also refer to a component in a treadle sewing machine that connects the foot pedal to the crankshaft of the lower flywheel. In this case, the Pitman arm works like a connecting rod in an engine in which the up and down force applied at one end of the arm translates to pushing and pulling alternately on the eccentric part of the crankshaft to achieve continuous rotation of the crankshaft and flywheel. The bearing connecting the Pitman arm to the crankshaft is known as the Pitman bearing. Early Pitman arms (up until around 1905) were made of wood, whereas later Pitman arms were made of steel. Wooden Pitman arms usually employed a simple wooden bushing around a steel shaft at both ends. The later steel Pitman arms usually used a ball joint at the lower pivot point and a ball bearing for the Pitman bearing at the top.

== See also ==
- List of auto parts
