= Alpine A110 (2017) =

Sports car produced by Renault as the spiritual successor to the Alpine A110

Alpine A110 Alpine A110S
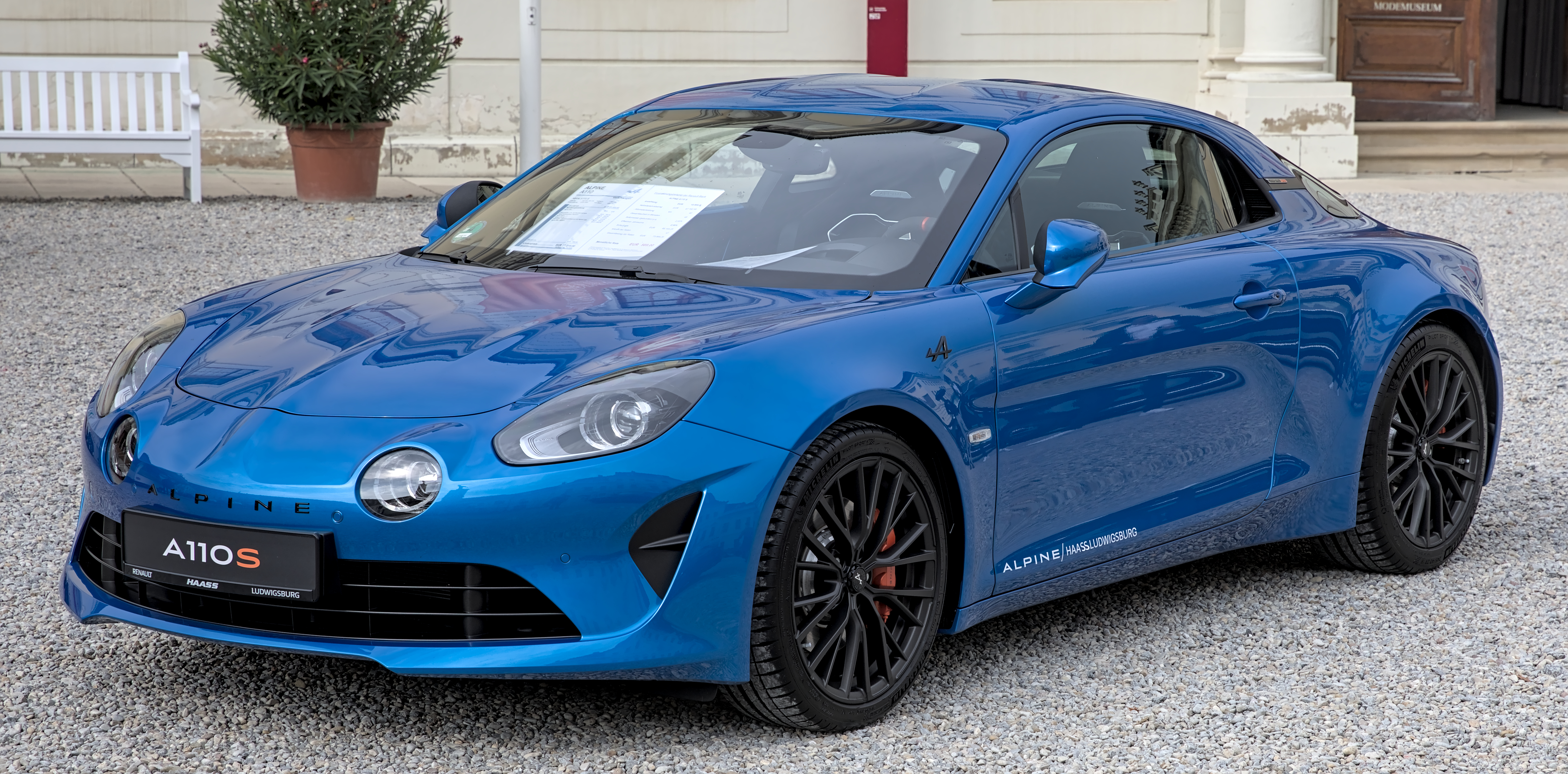

Overview
- Manufacturer: Alpine
- Model code: AEF
- Production: 2017–2026
- Assembly: France: Dieppe
- Designer: Deyan Denkov (exterior); Laurent Negroni (interior)

Body and chassis
- Class: Sports car (S)
- Body style: 2-door coupé
- Layout: Rear mid-engine, rear-wheel-drive

Powertrain
- Engine: 1.8 L M5Pt turbo I4
- Power output: 252 PS (249 hp; 185 kW), 320 N⋅m (236 lb⋅ft); A110S: 292 PS (288 hp; 215 kW), 320 N⋅m (236 lb⋅ft); A110R: 304 PS (300 hp; 224 kW), 340 N⋅m (251 lb⋅ft)
- Transmission: 7-speed 7DCT300 dual-clutch

Dimensions
- Wheelbase: 2,419 mm (95.2 in)
- Length: 4,178 mm (164.5 in)
- Width: 1,798 mm (70.8 in)
- Height: 1,252 mm (49.3 in)
- Curb weight: 1,103 kg (2,432 lb); 1,114 kg (2,456 lb) (A110S)

Chronology
- Predecessor: Alpine A110 (spiritual)

The Alpine A110 is a rear mid-engine, rear-wheel-drive sports car introduced by French car manufacturer Alpine at the 87th Geneva International Motor Show in March 2017.

Deliveries began in late 2017 for Continental European markets and in 2018 for the UK, Japan and Australia. Both its name and design refer back to the original Alpine A110 that was produced from 1961 to 1977. Production ended in June 2026, as Alpine was readying the plant for the A110's all-electric successor.

== Specifications ==
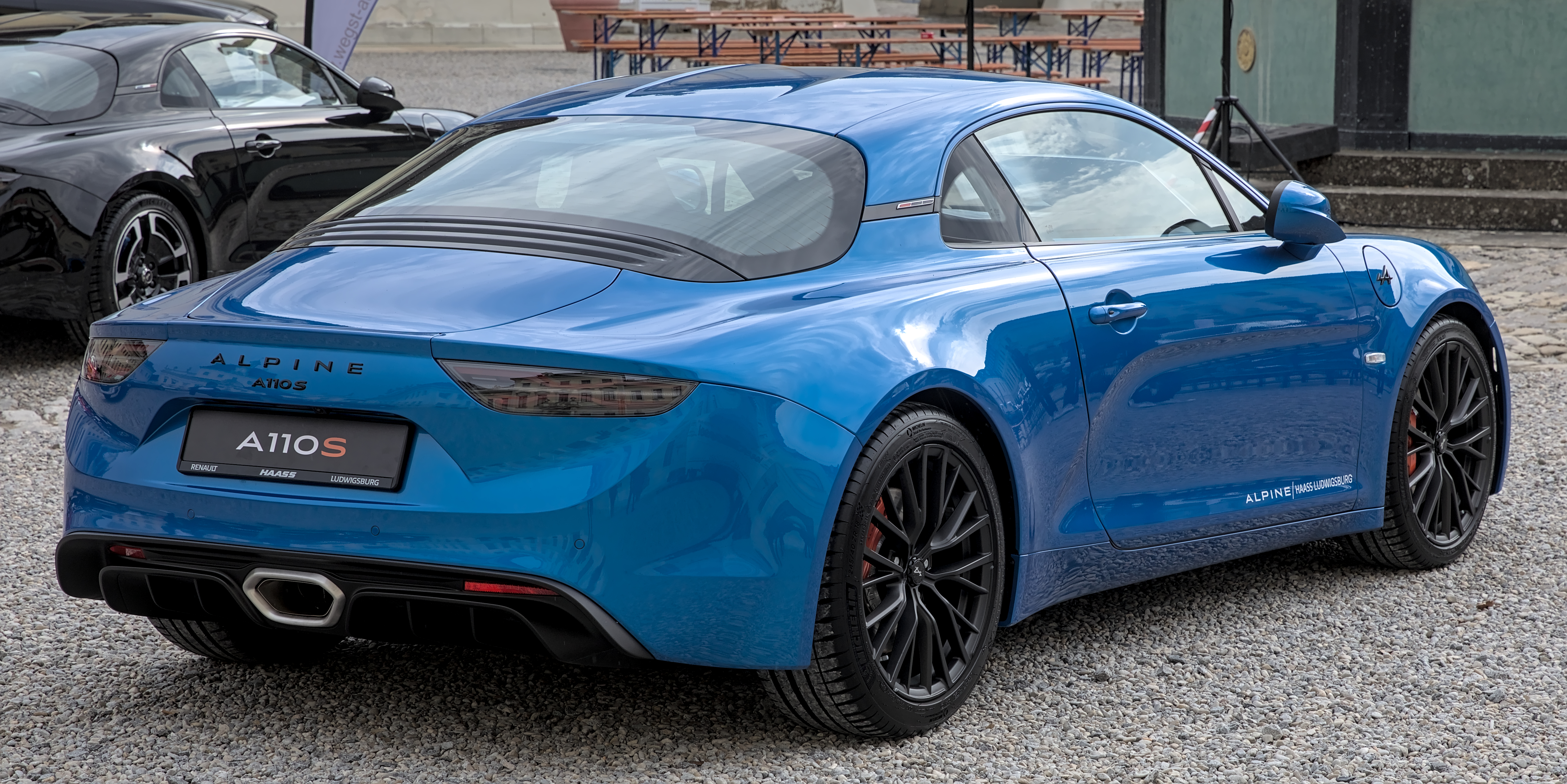
Rear 3/4 view

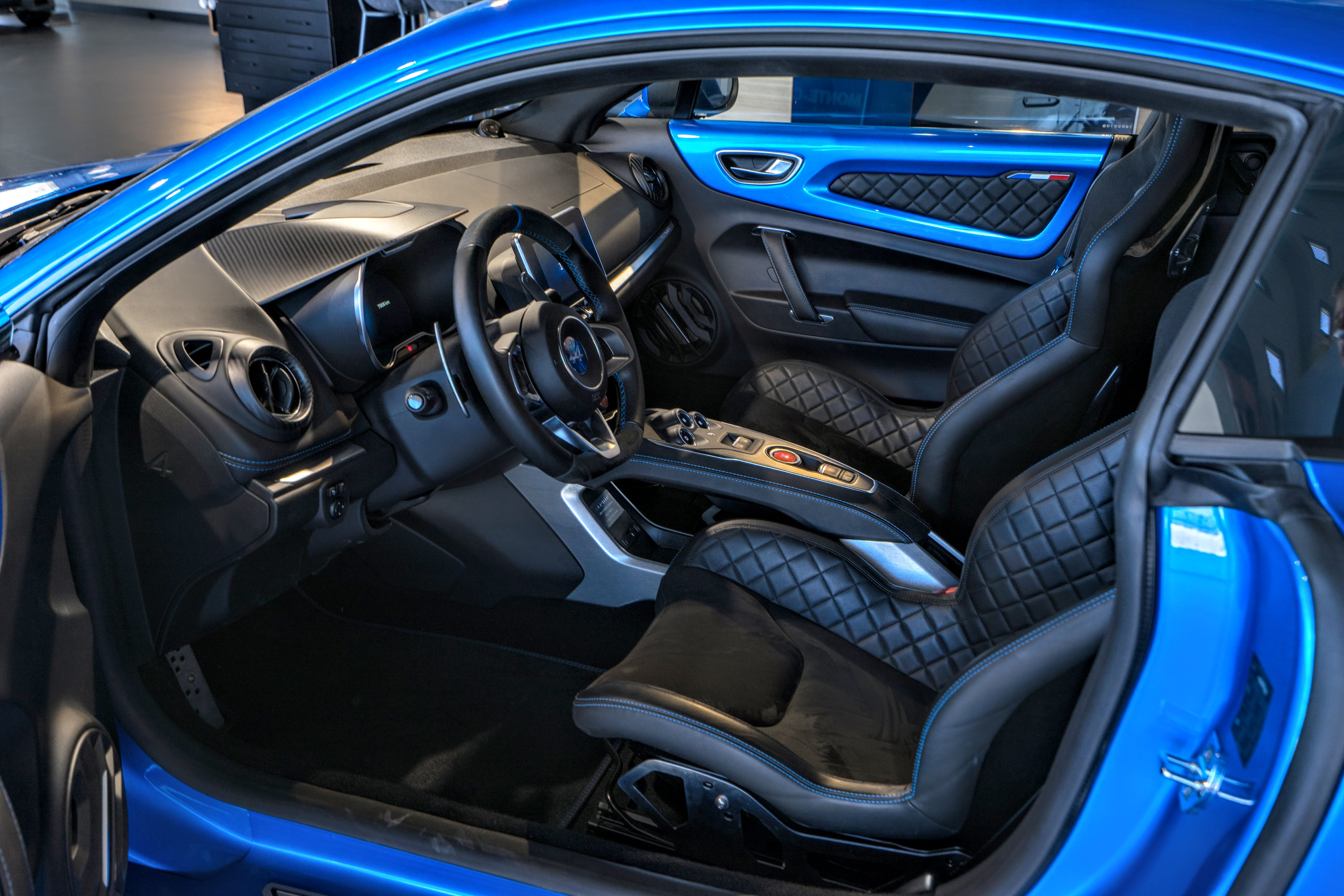
Interior with Sabelt seats

Based on an all-aluminium construction, the A110 is powered by a Nissan-derived 1.8-litre turbocharged gasoline direct injection 4 valves per cylinder inline-four engine mated to a 7-speed dual-clutch transmission manufactured by Getrag. Developed by Renault–Nissan and reworked by Alpine engineers, the engine has an output of 252 PS (185 kW; 249 hp) at 6,000 rpm and 320 N⋅m (236 lb⋅ft) of torque at 2,000–5,000 rpm. According to Alpine, the A110 can accelerate from 0 to 100 km/h (0 to 62 mph) in 4.5 seconds, and has an electronically limited top speed of 250 km/h (155 mph).

The A110 was initially available in three trims: Pure, Première, and Legende. The Pure cars, the base trim, have 17-inch alloy wheels. The Première trim cars are technically the launch edition models limited to 1,955 units and were equipped with amenities such as forged alloy wheels, quilted leather Sabelt bucket sports seats, a reversing camera, and metallic blue exterior colour as standard. The Legende trim cars come with six-way adjustable sports seats, black or brown leather interior upholstery, an upgraded hi-fi sound system, and specially designed wheels exclusive to this trim. All of the three trims share the same powertrain and transmission.

For the 2020 model year, The Pure trim level was replaced by the Alpine A110, with no other badging. The Légende was replaced by the Alpine A110 GT which employed the same engine as the A110 S.

== A110 S ==
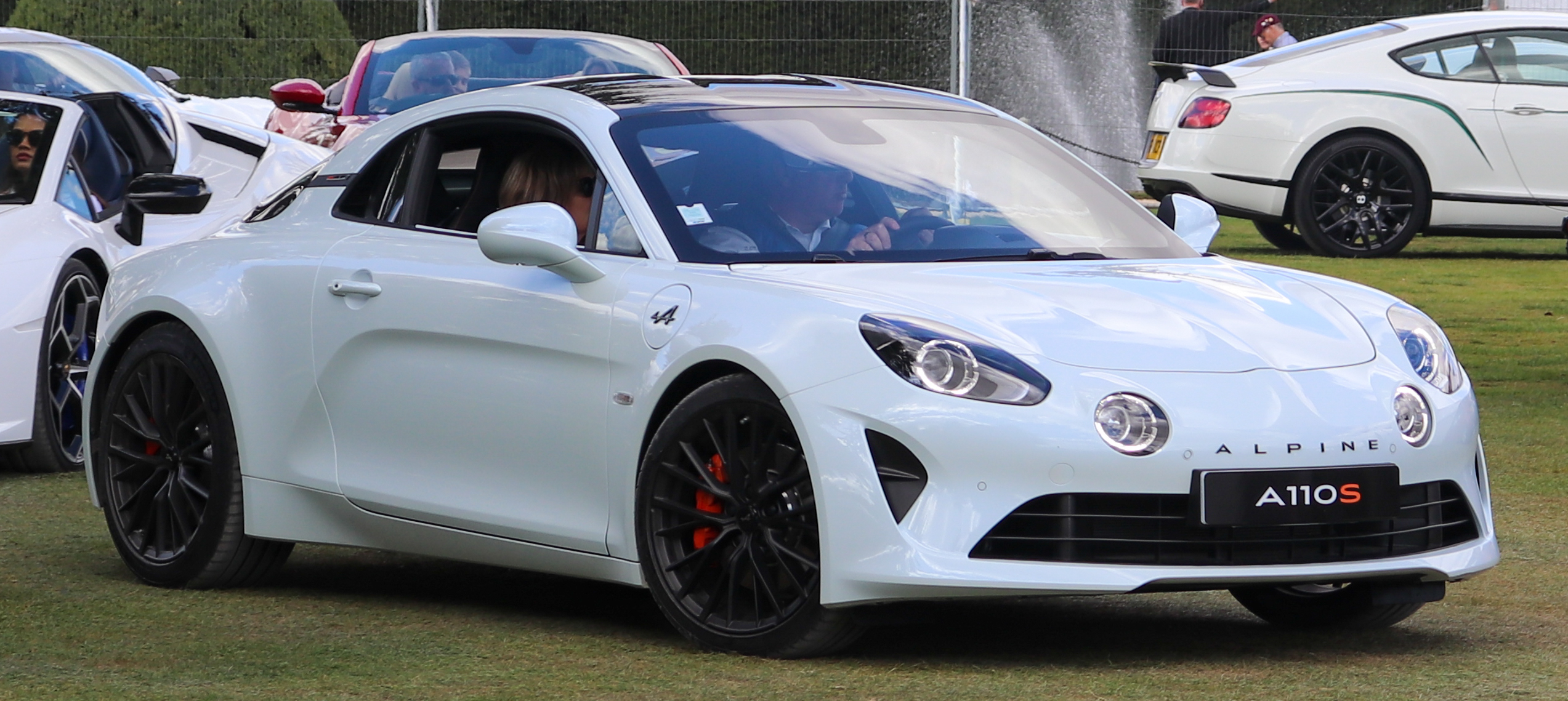
Alpine A110 S

Introduced in June 2019, the A110 S is a high performance and lightweight variant of the A110. The A110 S benefits from increased power output (from 252 to 300 PS (185 to 221 kW; 249 to 296 hp)) from its 1.8-litre turbocharged four-cylinder engine as well as stiffer springs, new anti-rollbars, dampers, and high performance brakes. The ride height is lowered by 4 mm (0.16 in) and the car is fitted with special Michelin Pilot Sport 4 tyres having a stickier compound contributing to more grip on the tarmac.

The engine was retuned and a larger turbocharger installed. The peak power is achieved at 1400 rpm higher than the standard engine. The 7-speed dual-clutch transmission remains unchanged. The new springs and anti-roll bars are respectively 50 and 100 percent stiffer than the standard car. The ESC system has also been retuned to improve handling and comes with a full-defeat mode.

Aesthetic changes include flag motifs, orange brake calipers and optional matte grey paintwork and lighter Fuchs alloy wheels. An optional carbon fibre roof with a gloss finish reduces 1.9 kg (4 lb) from the total weight of the car which is 1,114 kg (2,456 lb).

The A110 S can accelerate from 0 to 100 km/h (0 to 62 mph) in 4.4 seconds (0.1 seconds faster than the standard car) and has an electronically limited top speed of 250 km/h (155 mph).

== A110 R ==
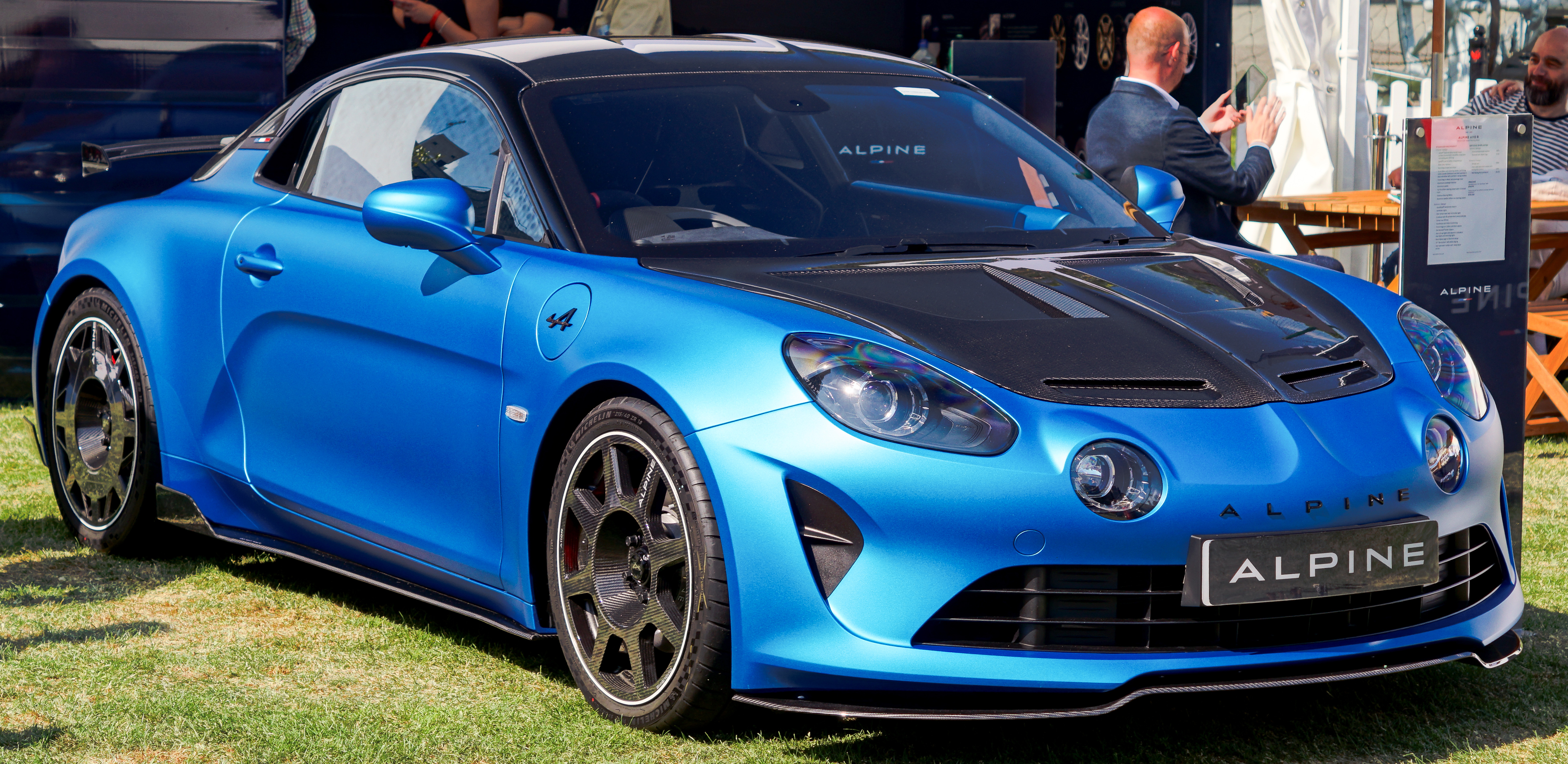
Alpine A110 R

The Alpine A110 R (which stands for "Radical") is a track-focused version that debuted on 4 October 2022, featuring a redesigned body kit and a more aggressive chassis setup.

It has been lightened and received performance upgrades, which helps it accelerate from 0 to 100 km/h in 3.9 seconds and can reach a top speed of 285 km/h.

The A110 R features a generous use of carbon fiber components, contributing to a weight reduction of 34 kilograms (75 pounds) and bringing the total weight down to 1,082 kilograms (2,385 pounds). Among the carbon fiber components are the hood with dual air ducts, the 18-inch wheels, the engine cover, and the Sabelt Track monocoque seats. Performance improvements include a 0 to 62 mph (100 km/h) sprint time of 3.9 seconds, which is three-tenths of a second faster than the A110 S, and a top speed of 177 mph (285 km/h). Additionally, the A110 R features a stiffer suspension setup with adjustable dampers, allowing the ground clearance to be lowered by 10 millimeters (0.4 inches), and Brembo brakes with improved cooling. The dual exhaust system has been upgraded with a double wall produced using 3D printing to better isolate exhaust gases

In 2024, Alpine revealed the A110R Ultime, which they announced would be the final all petrol-powered Alpine. It featured even more excessive carbon fibre components. Power was upgraded to 345bhp and performance upgrades resulted in a 0 to 62 mph (100 km/h) sprint time of 3.8 seconds. The top speed was maintained at 177 mph (285 km/h), only 110 A110 Ultimes were built, 15 of which were the bespoke LeBleu Editions.

== Other models ==
=== Production versions ===
==== A110 Première Edition ====
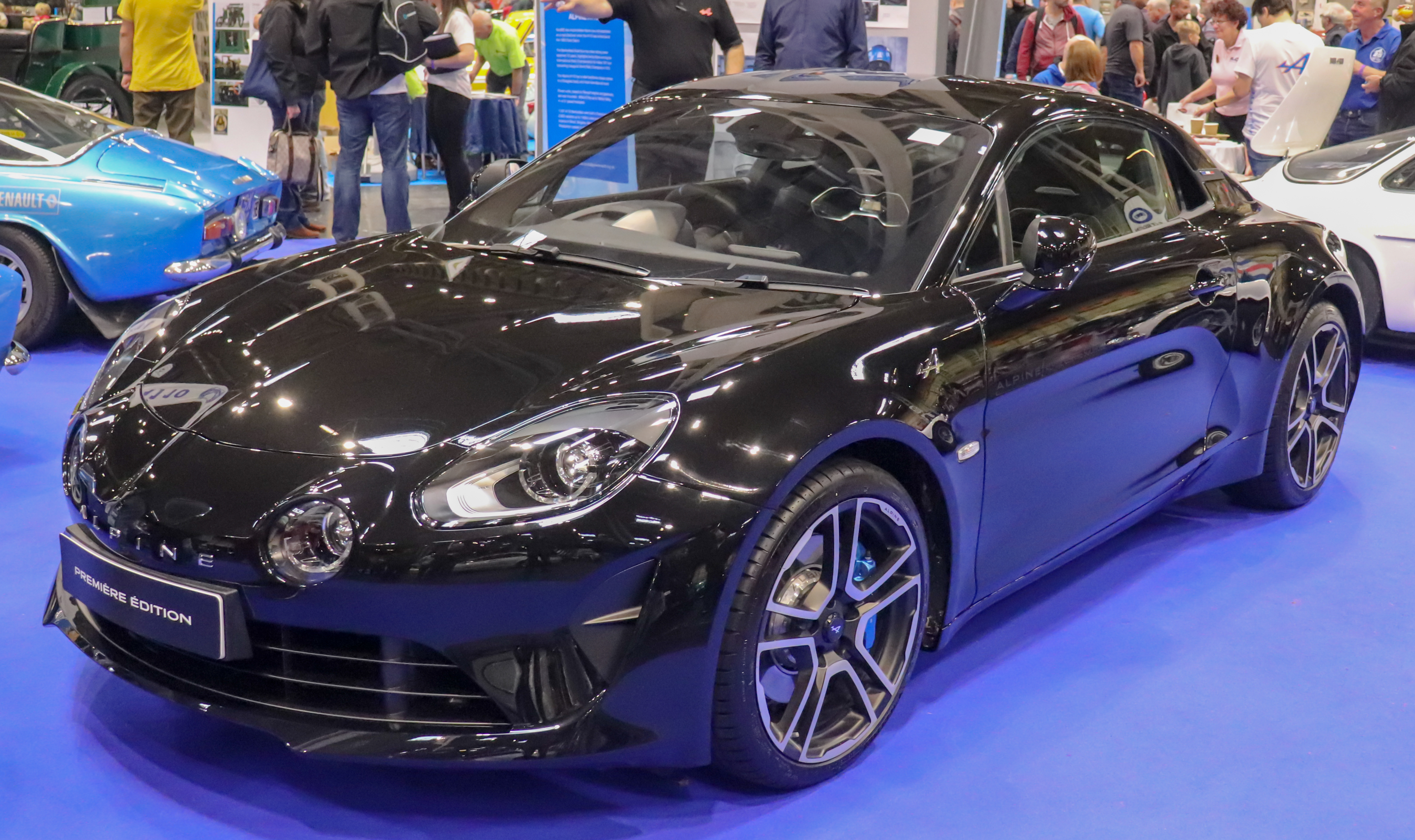
A110 Première Edition at the 2018 NEC Classic Motor Show

Pre-orders for the special "First Edition" opened on 7 December 2016, via the Alpine app, and it was available in 13 countries in 1955 units, a reference to the brand's founding year. Customers who wanted to buy this special series had to pay a deposit of 2000 euros, choose the number and color of the body they wanted. Alpine says all units were booked in one weekend, but opened classic orders shortly after. The entire production was pre-booked in three days. In the contract, the brand recommends a selling price between 55,000 and 60,000 euros (for the "Première Edition") and announced that the first deliveries took place at the end of 2017. In March 2017, Alpine revealed its price, being 58,500 euros.

==== A110 Légende GT ====
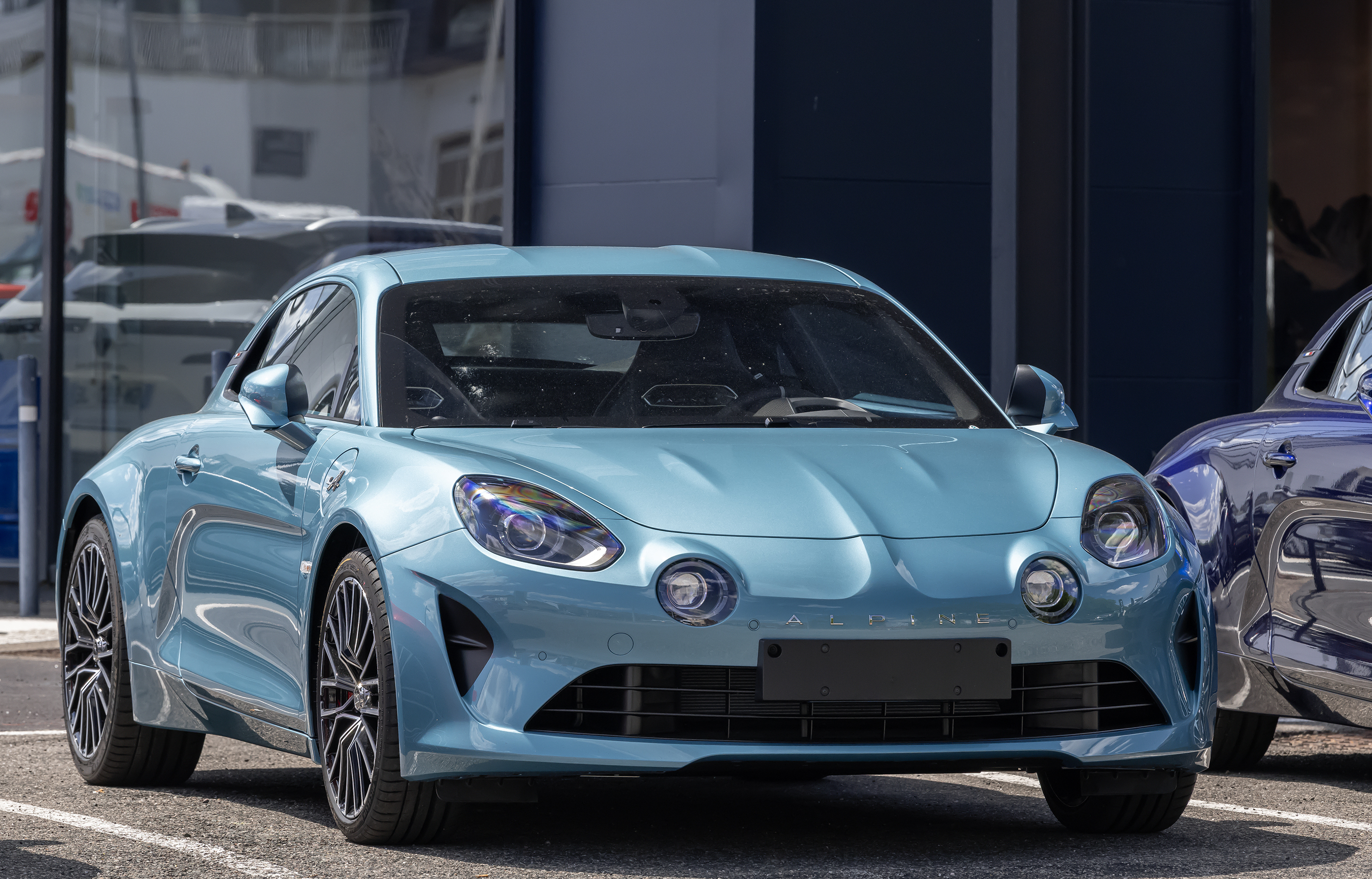
Alpine A110 GT

This special edition was launched in 2020, and following its success, Alpine introduced an updated model of it in 2021, with visual updates and the same powertrain as the A110S.

==== A110 Color Edition ====
The A110 Color Edition was launched in March 2020 alongside the A110 Légende GT, and comes in Sunflower Yellow, a contemporary reimagining of the Jaune Tournesol color that was popular on Alpine models in the 60s and 70s. It also includes 18-inch GT wheels, translucent taillights and new headlight inserts.

==== "Felipe Pantone" Art Car ====
In May 2021, following the collaboration for "Alpine F1 x Felipe Pantone", the French carmaker and the Argentinian artist revealed a new edition of the A110 with a custom paint job, with only three produced.

==== A110S Bi-Ton Limitee ====
A series limited to 24 units, only offered in Japan, based on the A110S in three configurations: Alpine Blue with Deep Black roof, Abyss Blue with Thunder Gray roof or Iridescent White with Deep Black roof.

==== Gendarmerie A110/A110 S ====
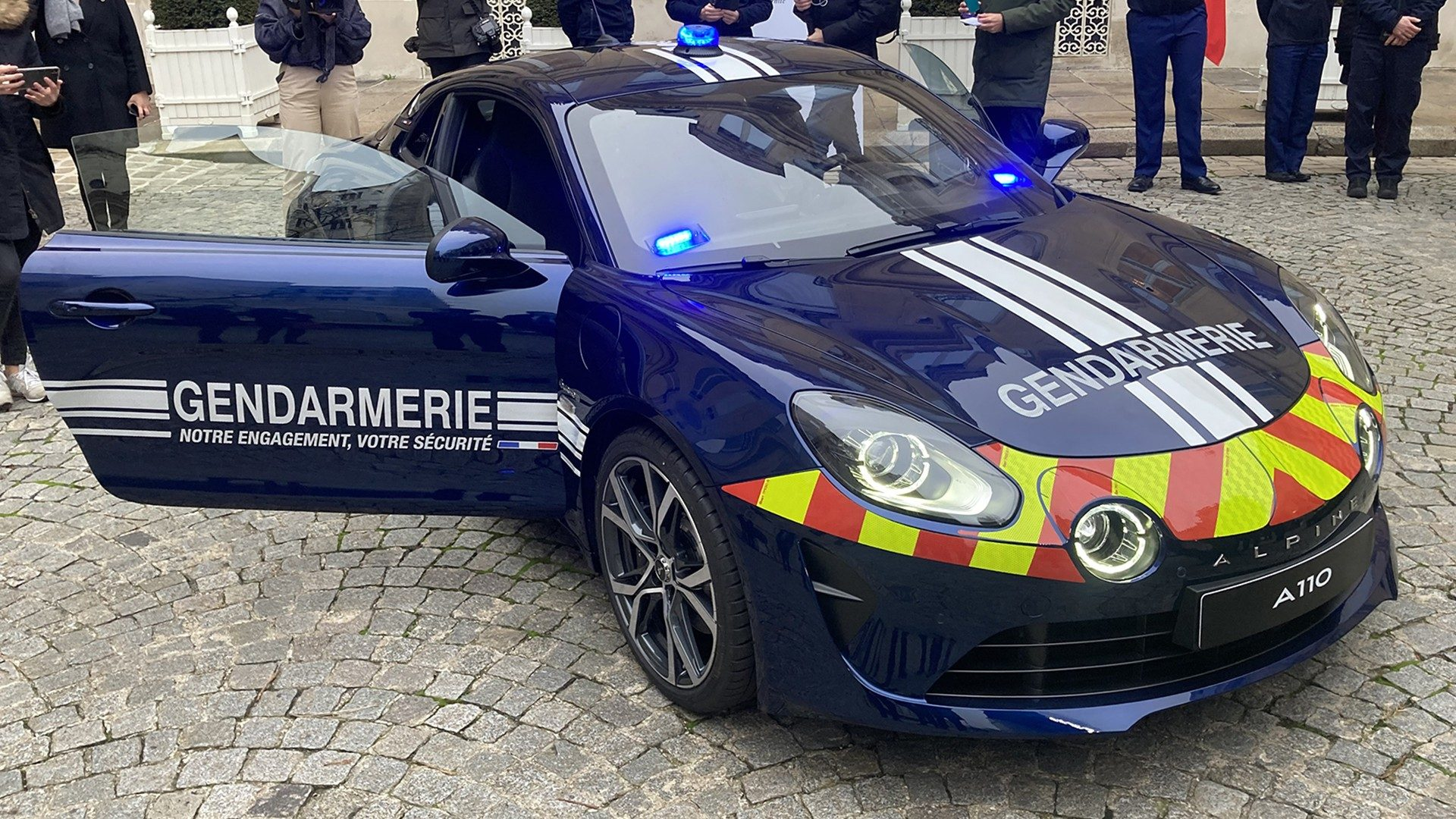
A National Gendarmerie Alpine A110

In April 2022, the French National Gendarmerie took delivery of 26 Alpine A110s built to police specification by specialist vehicle convertor Durisotti, replacing the fleet of Renault Mégane RS vehicles previously operated by the force. These vehicles, the first Alpines to be operated by the Gendarmerie since the A110s of the 1960s and A310s of the 1970s, were equipped with a singular roof light as well as other lighting, a variable message board on the rear of the vehicle, standard Gendarmerie radio equipment and reinforced seats in the interior and Sérac 18-inch wheel rims, with each A110 finished in Bleu Abysse with Gendarmerie reflective markings. A specially trained team of drivers was assembled by the National Gendarmerie to operate this first batch of A110s on the autoroutes of France. An A110 from this batch was rolled onto its roof in an accident along the A4 autoroute in Meuse shortly after delivery in July 2022.

A further batch of eleven Alpine A110 S models built to the same specification as the conventional A110s would later be delivered to the National Gendarmerie in 2023, placing the Gendarmerie's Alpine fleet at a total of 37 vehicles.

==== "South Beach Colorway" Pack ====
In May 2022, Alpine celebrates its first F1 Grand Prix in Miami and has launched the "South Beach Colorway" package for the A110, which includes two special exterior shades created by the Alpine Atelier customization program. The new colors are Bleu Azur (teal) and Rose Bruyère (pink), coming with interior and exterior accents.

==== A110 GT "Jean Rédélé" ====
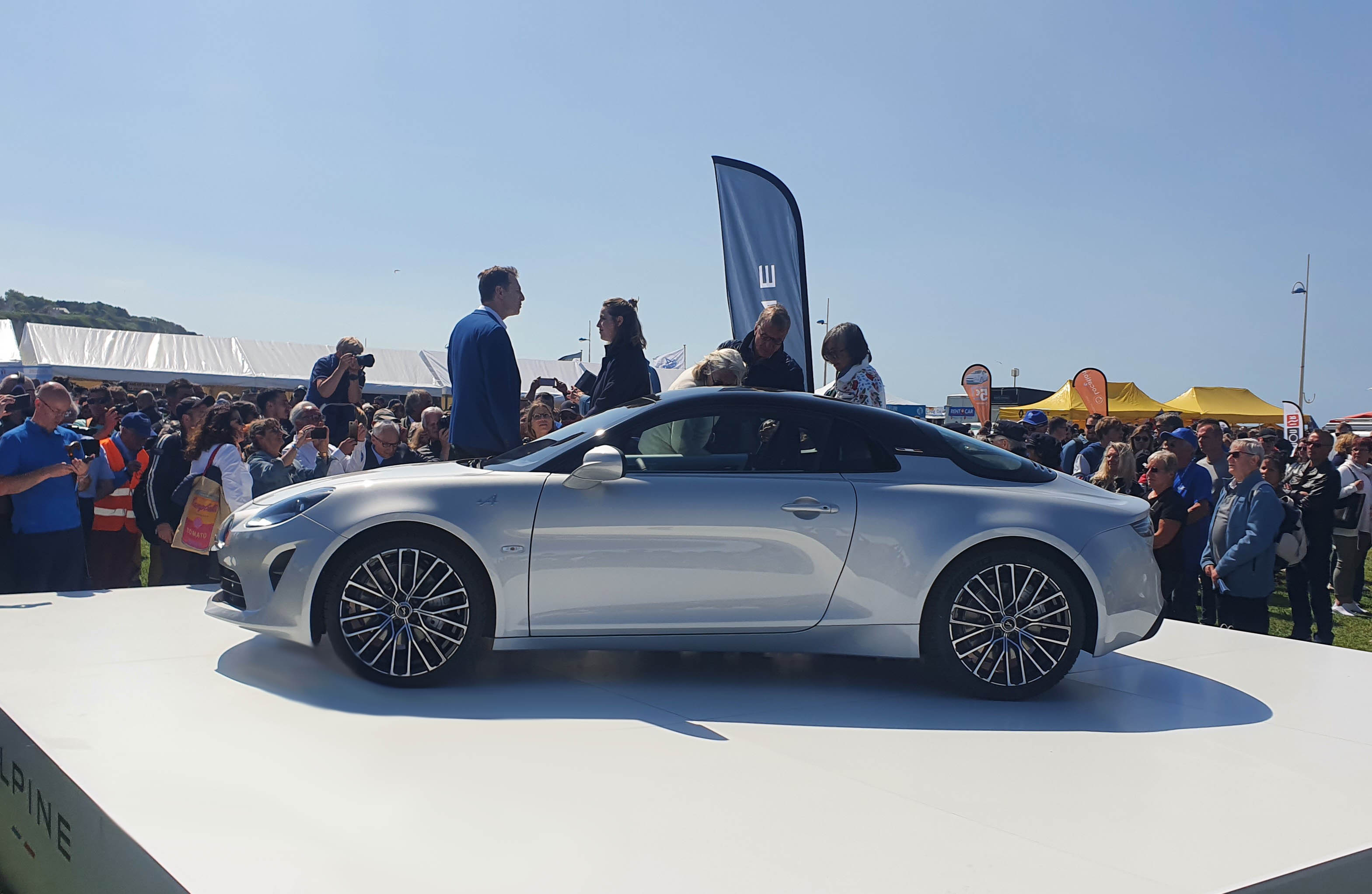
The GT "Jean Rédélé" presented at the 1000 Alpine pour les 100 ans de Jean Rédélé rally

Also in May 2022, Alpine revealed another new special edition A110, this one named after racing driver and Alpine founder Jean Rédélé, honoring the 100th anniversary of his birth, and had a limited production run of 100 units.

==== A110 Tour de Corse 75 ====
In June 2022, the A110 Tour de Corse 75 edition was launched, inspired by the Berlinette rally car no. 7 which took part in the 1975 Tour de France. It was produced in only 150 units, allocated to specific markets.

==== A110 R Fernando Alonso ====
Unveiled in October 2022, a few days after the A110 R, this limited run of 32 units was dedicated to racing driver Fernando Alonso.

==== A110 San Remo 73 ====
Available to order from 17 March 2023 in France, the A110 San Remo 73 special edition, limited to 200 units, celebrates 50 years since the original A110 won at Sanremo, marking the manufacturer's first and only WRC title.

=== Concepts ===
==== Vision ====
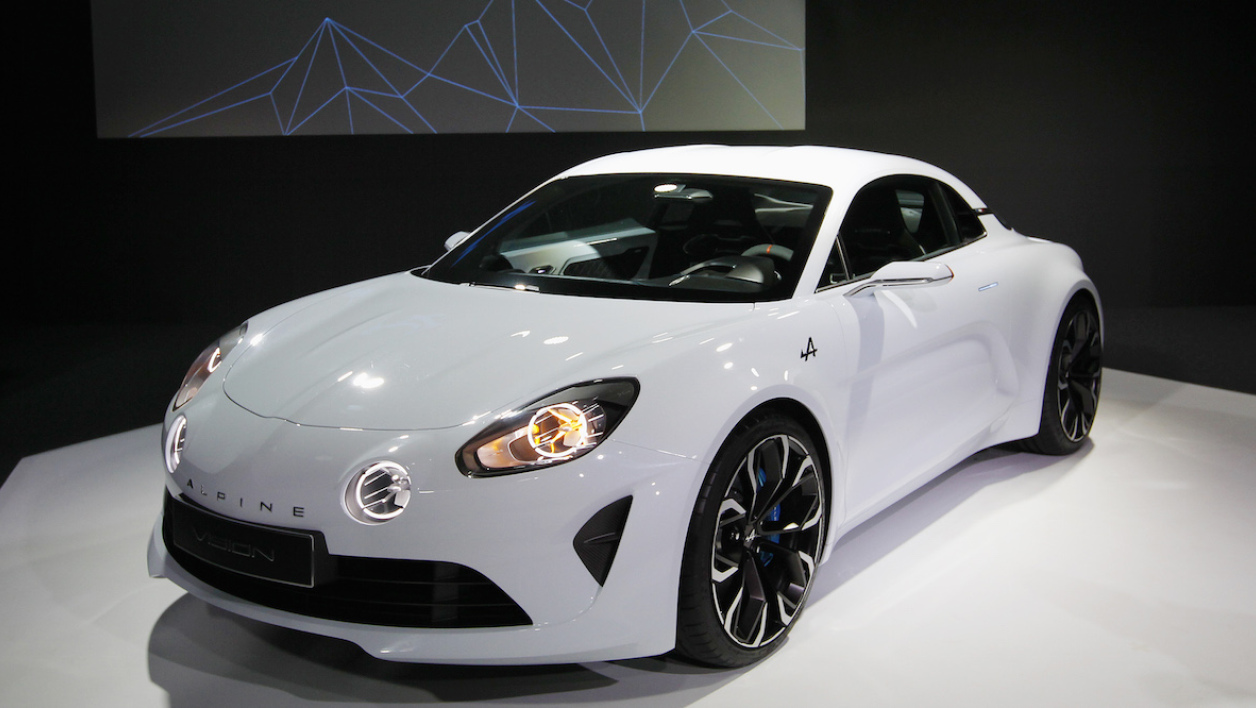
Alpine Vision (2016)

The Alpine Vision is a concept car presented in February 2016 in Monaco which directly previewed the Alpine A110.

==== A110 SportsX ====
The Alpine A110 SportsX is a concept car based on the A110 Pure, presented at the 35th edition of the International Automobile Festival in January 2020.

==== A110 E-ternité ====
The Alpine A110 E-ternité is an electric-powered A110 prototype presented in July 2022 on the occasion of the 2022 Formula 1 French Grand Prix. It is equipped with a 178 kW (242 hp) electric motor with 300 N⋅m (221 lb⋅ft) of torque, mated to a two-speed dual-clutch gearbox. The motor is powered by a lithium-ion battery from the Renault Mégane E-Tech Electric with a capacity of 60 kWh.

== Engines ==
Petrol engine
Model	Displacement	Type code	Power	Torque	0–100 km/h (0–62 mph) (s)
A110	1,798 cc (109.7 cu in)	TCe M5P	249 hp (186 kW; 252 PS)	320 N⋅m (236 lb⋅ft) at 2,000–5,000 rpm	4.5
A110S	1,798 cc (109.7 cu in)	TCe M5P	288 hp (215 kW; 292 PS)	320 N⋅m (236 lb⋅ft) at 2000–6,400 rpm	4.4
A110R	1,798 cc (109.7 cu in)	TCe M5P	300 hp (224 kW; 304 PS)	340 N⋅m (251 lb⋅ft) at 2000–6,400 rpm	3.9
A110R Ultime	1,798 cc (109.7 cu in)	TCe M5P	345 hp (257 kW; 350 PS)	420 N⋅m (310 lb⋅ft) at 2000–6,400 rpm	3.8

== Sales ==
Year	France	Europe	Global (total)
2018	1,156	1,950	2,091
2019	3,172	4,376	4,835
2020	743	1,343	1,526
2021	1,618	2,427	2,659
2022	2,138		3,546
2023	2,693		4,328
2024	2,698		4,408
2025			2,681

== Future development ==
The 2026 Alpine Performance Platform-based Alpine A110

In January 2021, Alpine signed an MoU with Lotus Cars for the development of the next generation A110, which was intended to enter production by 2025. The deal with Lotus was canceled by mutual agreement in May 2023, the two firms agreeing to pursue development of their respective flagship sportscars separately.

In June 2021, Alpine (encompassing the recently renamed Renault Sport and Renault Formula One divisions) announced that its thirty-year partnership with BorgWarner would continue for the production of future Alpine powertrains. In addition to the next model of the A110 to be developed in partnership with Lotus, a B-segment compact sports car based on the CMF-B EV and a C-segment sports cross-over based on the CMF-EV were mentioned. BorgWarner's 2019 acquisition of Delphi Technologies has led to speculation that the next A110 may feature Delphi's silicon carbide inverter with a 800V traction pack, rather than a more common 400V system.

In December 2024, Alpine announced that the release of the third-generation Alpine A110 would be delayed until 2026 but that, at 1,450 kg (3,200 lbs), it would be lighter than comparable combustion vehicles while maintaining a 563 km (350 mile) range.

In October 2025, it was announced that only 1,750 more of the second-generation gasoline-powered A110s would be produced, ending in mid-2026 when the third-generation Alpine Performance Platform (APP)-based 800V A110s are slated to begin shipping.

== Motorsport ==
=== A110 Cup ===
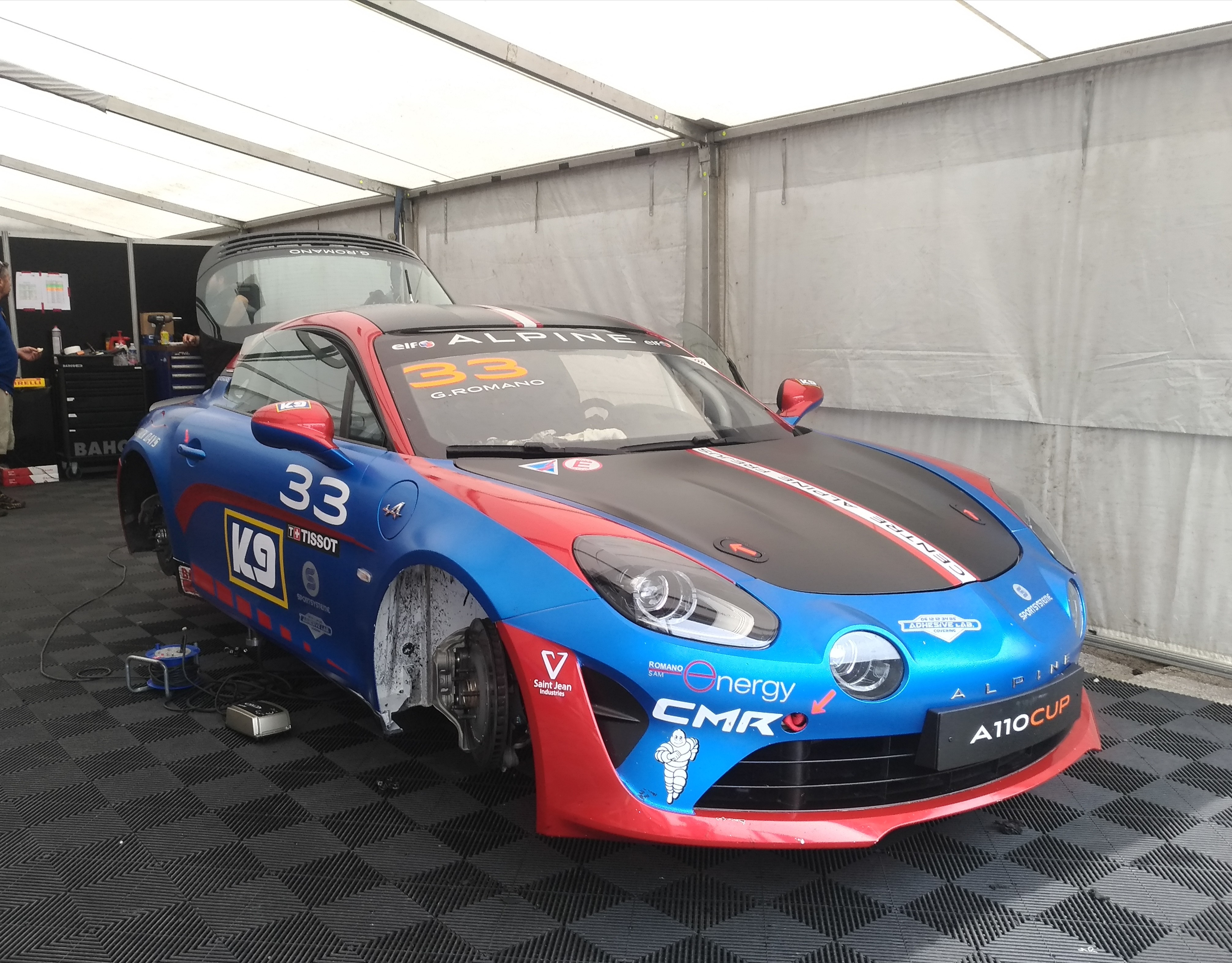
A110 Cup driven by Grégory Romano

The Alpine A110 Cup was revealed in October 2017. This track-only version of the A110 utilizes the same chassis as the road car but has been modified to include a roll cage, adjustable suspension and racing brakes. The 1.8 L turbocharged engine is also similar to the street car but power has been upped to 270 hp that is transferred to the track through a bespoke racing sequential gearbox and Michelin racing tires. The car is designed for use in the new Alpine Elf Europa Cup series that will visit 6 tracks in Europe for its inaugural season. Only 20 cars will be built in its debut season and they are priced around €100,000 each.

=== A110 GT4 ===
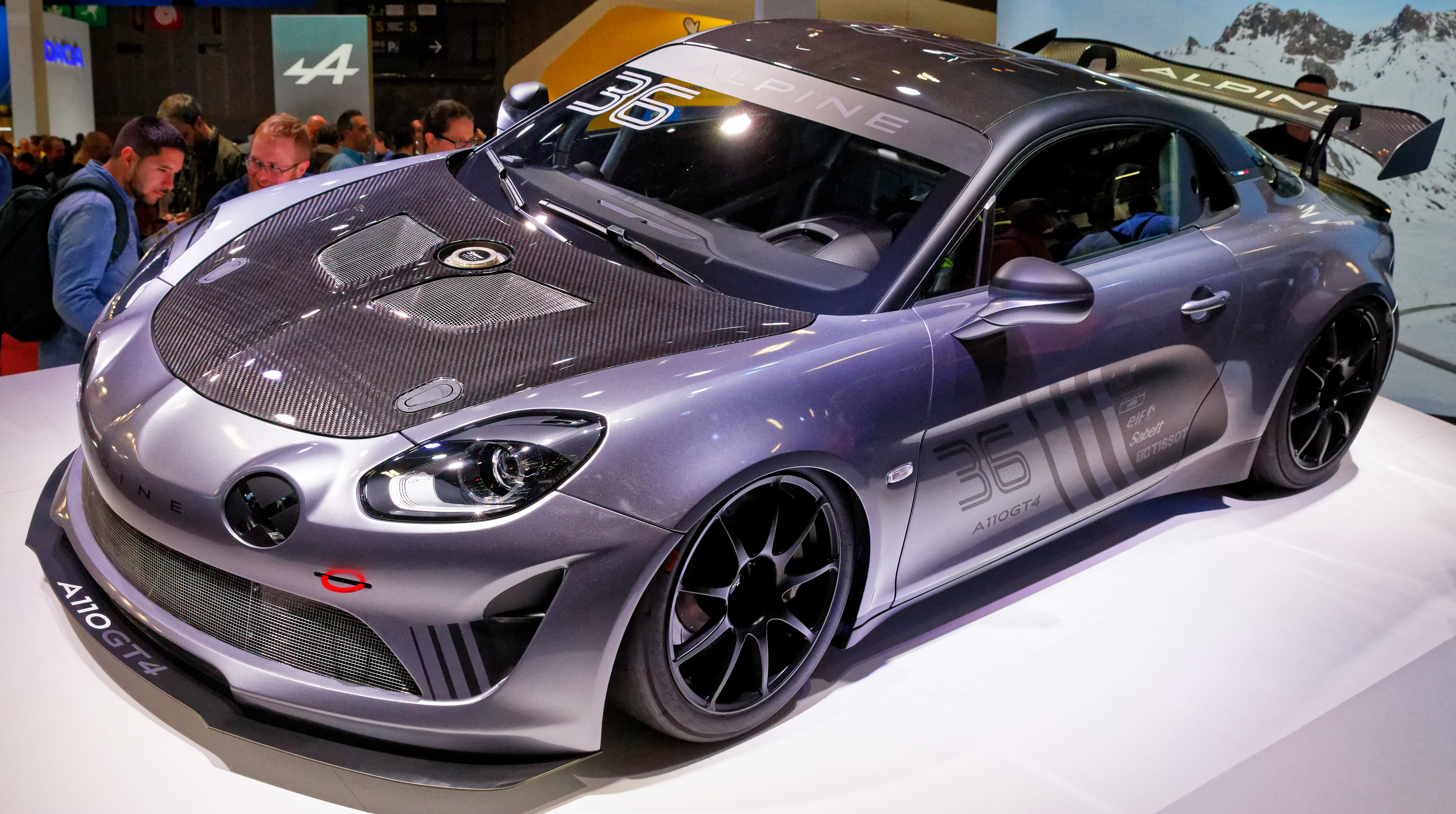
An Alpine A110 GT4 on display at the 2018 Paris Motor Show

At the 2018 Geneva Motor Show, Alpine revealed a new GT4 version of the Alpine A110 Cup. This upgraded version of the A110 Cup comes with more power as well as revised aerodynamics highlighted by an extremely aggressive front splitter and a large rear wing. Customers of the original A110 Cup car can upgrade their cars to GT4 spec for a fee. The A110 GT4 entered competition throughout the second half of 2018. In 2022, Alpine released the A110 GT4 Evo, featuring improvements to the gearbox, turbo, and engine block. A second Evo update package for the A110 GT4 was announced in 2025, the Alpine A110 GT4+. Alpine updated the exhaust, various anti-lag and traction control systems and a new atmospheric pressure adaptation system. Additionally, the front splitter was revised, a redesigned gearbox spacer, new carbon fiber airbox and larger front radiator for improved temperature management. The A110 GT4+ can be purchased new for €220,000 excluding VAT, with an upgrade kit for existing cars available for €34,000 excluding VAT. The car has had great success in the FFSA GT Championship and GT4 European Series, capturing championships in both.

=== A110 Rally ===
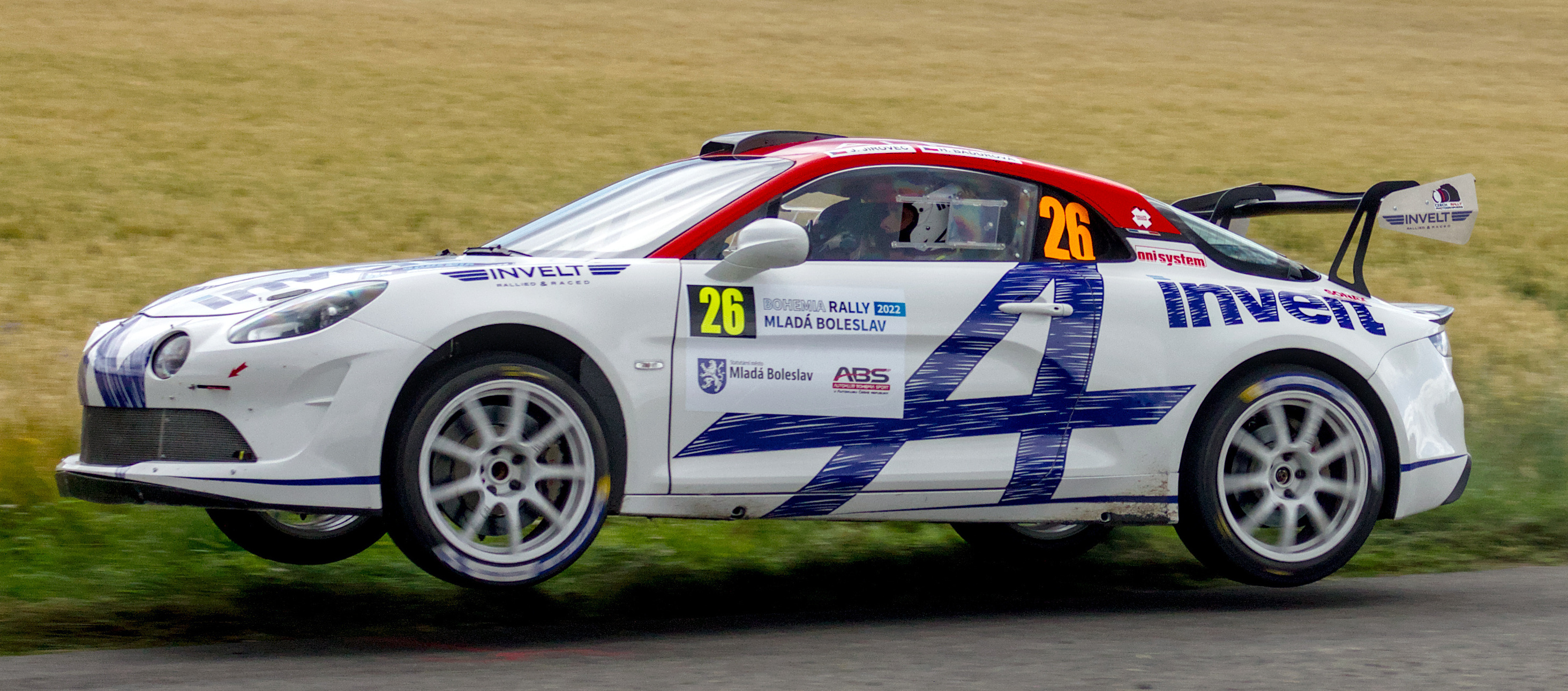
A110 R-GT at the 2022 Bohemia Rally

The Alpine A110 Rally was announced in May 2019 and officially presented during the Rallye Mont-Blanc Morzine (5-7 September 2019). It is homologated by the FIA to Group R-GT specifications, its light aluminium chassis is derived from the Cup & GT4 versions and has 1.8-litre, 4-cylinder turbocharged engine delivering between 320 and 330 horsepower. In 2020 an Alpine Trophy championship consisting of five rounds of the 2020 FFSA French Tarmac Rally Championship calendar was created. The first two rounds of the championship were won by Emmanuel Guigou with a notable third overall at the Rallye Mont-Blanc Morzine 2020 a year after its official presentation.

=== A110 Pikes Peak ===
Alpine will participate for the first time in its history on 25 June 2023, in the Pikes Peak International Hill Climb, using a special variant of the A110 developed in collaboration with Signatech. It was unveiled in May 2023, featuring revised aerodynamics, a tuned engine producing nearly 500 hp (370 kW) and a weight of only 950 kg (2,090 lb).

== In popular culture ==
The car attracted some attention in February 2018, when a company-provided car caught fire while being filmed for an episode of British television programme Top Gear. The responding fire personnel were not able to control the fire, and the car was burnt to destruction. This was due to a fuel failure when Chris Harris said, "There’s a red light on the dashboard, smoke, smoke, smoke!"

James May remarked on the Alpine A110, "It has 248bhp, weighs the square root of diddly, and is the greatest thing to come out of France since the Mouli cheese grater." May eventually bought an Alpine in mid-2018, referring to it as his "car of the year".

With Renault rebranding to Alpine for the 2021 Formula One World Championship, the brand introduced two cars exclusively used by drivers Fernando Alonso and Esteban Ocon to drive to the different tracks of the European leg of the season. The two cars have the same livery as the Alpine A521, along with their driver numbers on the bonnet.

Kouki Sawatari drives three variants of the A110 in the manga and anime series MF Ghost.
