= Alpine A106 =

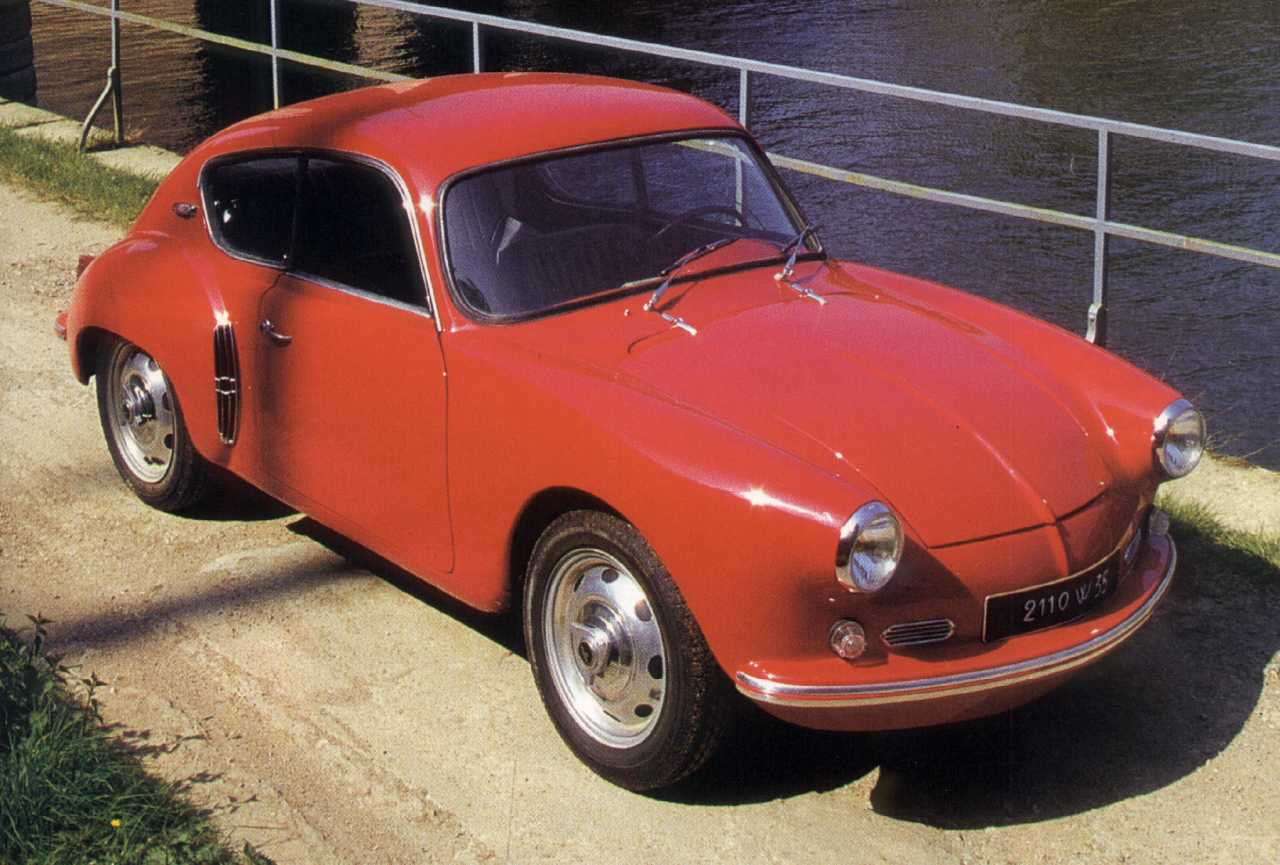

Overview
- Manufacturer: Alpine
- Production: 1955–1961
- Assembly: Dieppe, France
- Designer: Giovanni Michelotti

Body and chassis
- Class: Sports car
- Body style: 2-door Coupé; Cabriolet
- Layout: RR layout
- Related: Renault 4CV

Powertrain
- Engine: 747 cc ohv I4; 904 cc ohv I4
- Transmission: 3-speed manual 5-speed (Claude designed transmission optional)

Dimensions
- Wheelbase: 2,100 mm (83 in)
- Length: 3,700 mm (150 in)
- Width: 1,450 mm (57 in)
- Height: 1,270 mm (50 in)
- Curb weight: 540 kg (1,190 lb)

Chronology
- Successor: Alpine A108

The Alpine A106 is a sports car that was the first of a line of light-weight glass-fibre bodied, rear-engined two-door coupés produced for a young competition-oriented Dieppe based Renault dealer called Jean Rédélé. The car was based on mechanical components from the Renault 4CV.

== Origins ==
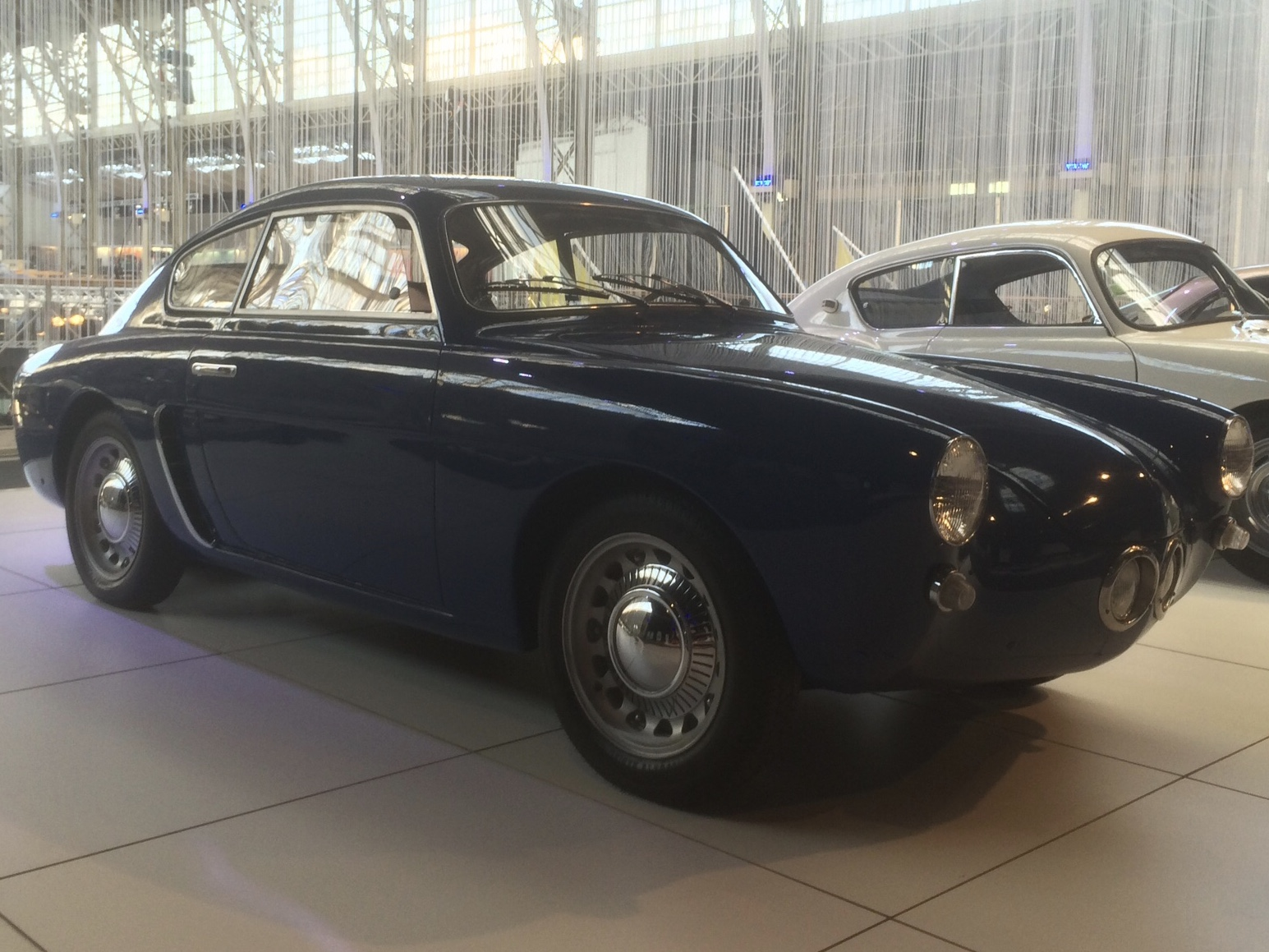
1954 Le Marquis Prototype

The car was inspired by the "Marquis" a Renault 4CV based coupé, a design acquired for production under licence in the United States but which had never entered production. More direct inspiration came from the "Allemano", another Renault 4CV based coupé prototype, and modified by Chappe et Gessalin, the firm that would assemble the early "glass fibre" bodied A106s for Alpine.

Under the skin, the A106 closely resembled the 4CV. The more sporting 43 hp (32 kW) "A106 Mille Miles" would derive from a competition version of the 4CV model developed by Renault.

== The name ==
The number "106" also came from Renault. 1060, 1062 and 1063 were the reference numbers under which the 4CV had been registered with the French homologation authorities. The Alpine 107 was a steel-bodied prototype, which never entered production.

== The launch ==
The emphasis at this stage was not on selling cars to the public but on chalking up successes in competition, indicating financial support from Renault for Alpine. Following on from the one-off "Marquis" and "Alemano" prototypes, in the summer of 1955 the first three Alpine A106s, painted respectively red, white and blue, were presented to Renault CEO Pierre Dreyfus in the yard at Renault's large (though by now rather cramped) Billaincourt plant. The cars had been assembled by Chappe et Gessalin, in order to meet a special order received from Charles Escoffier, the owner of a large Paris based Renault dealership who also happened to be the father in law of Jean Rédélé.

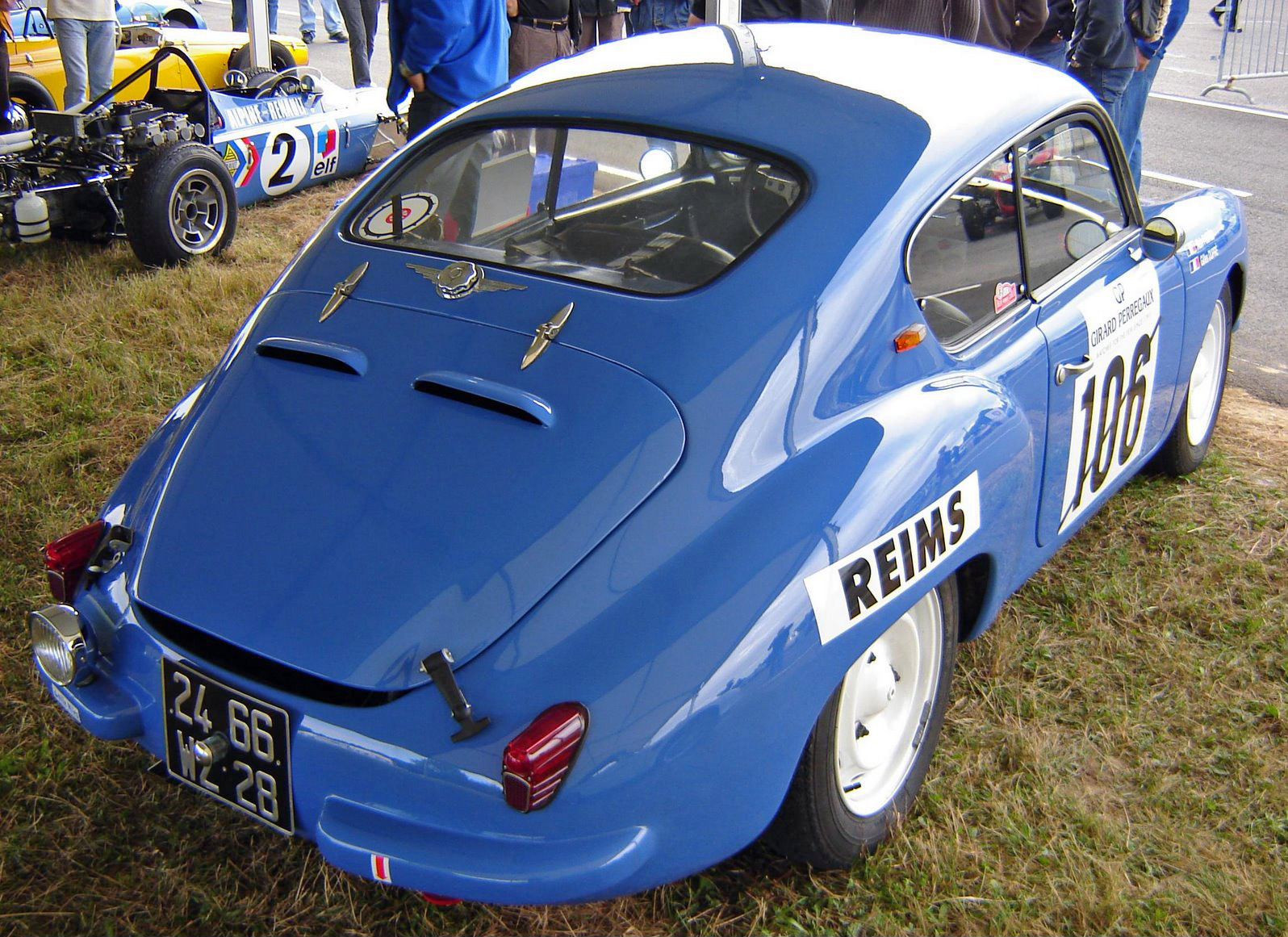
Rear view of coach Mille Miles version

From 1955 the little A106 started to accumulate a succession of victories, and various performance enhancing options were offered such as "Mille Miles (Mille Miglia) suspension" following A106 participation in the eponymous race. The Mille Miles specifications involve using four shock absorbers at the back, and was the suspension system later used for the Renault 8 Gordini. Also offered was a five-speed manual gear box manufactured under license: a five-speed gear box in a road car of this class was almost unheard of, and since the gearbox option alone came with a price tag sufficient to purchase 35% of a Renault 4CV, Alpine A106s incorporating the five-speed gear box option remained rare. In 1956 Jean Claude Galtier and Maurice Michy achieved a podium place and class victory for the A106 in the Mille Miglia race.

== Commercialisation ==
Although the initial emphasis was on sporting success, in October 1957 the A106 made its first appearance at the Paris Motor Show. In 1957 Chappe et Gessalin relocated production facilities for the fibre-glass bodied cars from Saint-Maur to a new more spacious site (which a few years later became their headquarters) at Brie-Comte-Robert. This prepared the way for increasing production levels.

The A106 still came with the same little 747 cc Renault engine, but now three different power output versions were offered, providing respectively 21 hp (15 kW) at 4,100 rpm, 30 hp (22 kW) at 4,800 rpm or, on the A106 Mille Miles, 43 hp (32 kW) at 6,300 rpm. Performance differences correlated with different carburettors and higher compression ratios and, in the case of the fastest car, 40 kg (88 lb) of weight reduction.

The October 1957 Paris Motor Show also marked the first appearance of the Michelotti styled Alpine cabriolet. Subsequently, a closed coupé version of this car would also be produced ("coach" in French), and it would eventually become the Alpine A108. At this stage, however, the A106 continued to be the manufacturer's principal model, and by the time production ended around 650 had been produced.

A larger engined version of the car later appeared offering a maximum 59 hp (43 kW) of power from a 904 cc version of the Dauphine engine. In 1959 a tubular-framed backbone chassis version was introduced.

In 1960 emphasis switched from the A106 to the A108, and at some point during the next couple of years the last A106 was produced. The A106 had established Alpine's credentials as an auto-brand, but it successor would be produced in significantly greater numbers and would become much better known than the A106 had managed.
