= Alpine A108 =

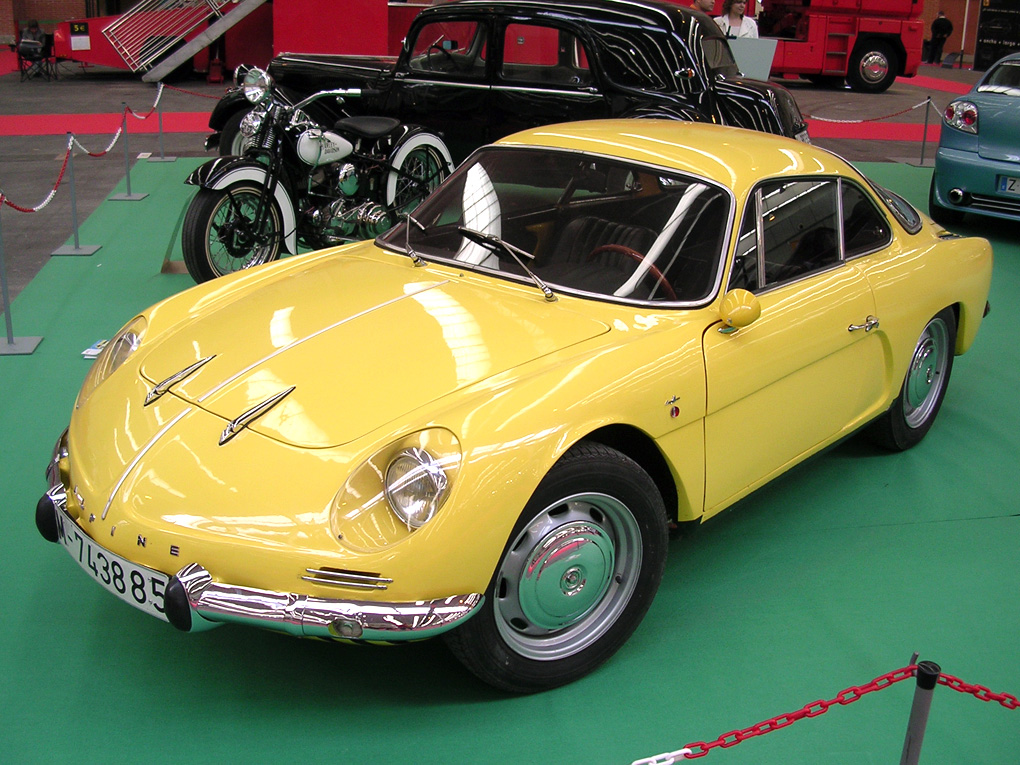

Overview
- Manufacturer: Alpine
- Also called: Willys Interlagos (Brazil)
- Production: 1958–1965
- Assembly: Dieppe, France; São Bernardo do Campo, Brazil
- Designer: Giovanni Michelotti & Phillipe Charles

Body and chassis
- Class: Sports car
- Body style: 2-door Coupé; 2-door 2+2 Coupé; 2-door Cabriolet
- Layout: RR layout
- Related: Renault Dauphine

Powertrain
- Engine: 845 cc OHV I4; 904 cc OHV I4; 998 cc OHV I4
- Transmission: 3-speed manual 4-speed manual 5-speed manual

Dimensions
- Wheelbase: 2,100 mm (83 in); 2,160 mm (85 in)
- Length: 3,700 mm (150 in); 3,780 mm (149 in)
- Width: 1,450 mm (57 in)
- Height: 1,270 mm (50 in)
- Curb weight: 530 kg (1,168 lb); 600 kg (1,323 lb)

Chronology
- Predecessor: Alpine A106
- Successor: Alpine A110

The Alpine A108 is a light-weight glass-fibre bodied, rear-engined two-door coupé produced for a young competition-oriented Dieppe based Renault dealer called Jean Rédélé. The car replaced the Alpine A106 and was based on mechanical components from the Renault Dauphine.

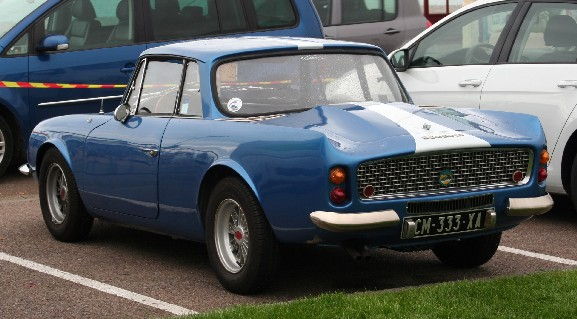
Alpine A108 2+2 rear view

== History ==
The 108 was launched at the Paris Motor Show in autumn 1957, but production volumes were low and the company’s principal offering continued to be the older 106 model until 1960.

The Alpine 106 had taken its name from the first three digits of the four-digit homologation number of the old Renault 4CV on which the car was based. Applying the same logic, the new car should have been called 109 because it used mechanical components from the newer Renault Dauphine which was registered under the French homologation number 1090, but instead the new car, which inherited many of its non-mechanical components from the 106, was given the name Alpine 108. In this form, where the 106 had used an engine from the Renault 4CV, the new model, as launched in 1957, used the Gordini version of the 845 cc engine fitted in the Dauphine.

1960 saw the introduction of an Alpine 108 cabriolet and a 2+2 coupé. These versions were slightly longer than the original and featured a newly developed “beams and backbone” chassis with the beams at each end supporting cradles which carried respectively the engine at the rear and the steering mechanism at the front. This basic architecture would be used for Alpine sports cars until the Alpine A110 was phased out in 1977. These models, like the original coupé, were assembled by Chappe et Gessalin, but with a wheelbase lengthened by 7 cm (2.8 in). The mechanical elements were as before, with the Renault Dauphine engine offered in 845 cc or 904 cc form. The lesser engine offered 37 hp (27 kW), while the bigger one claimed 53 hp (39 kW). By the time production of the 108 came to an end in 1965, fewer than 100 of these lengthened versions had been produced.

The 108 played an important part in the transformation of Alpine into a mainstream (though always low volume) car producer. In 1960, an upgraded version of the model known as the Berlinette Tour de France replaced the original “coach” version of the car. The obvious visual difference was at the front, where the headlights were now integrated into the front wing behind a windcheating perspex cover. This was the model offered in the showrooms from autumn 1960 and which continued in production until 1965, preparing the way for the commercially more successful A110.

== Brazilian production ==
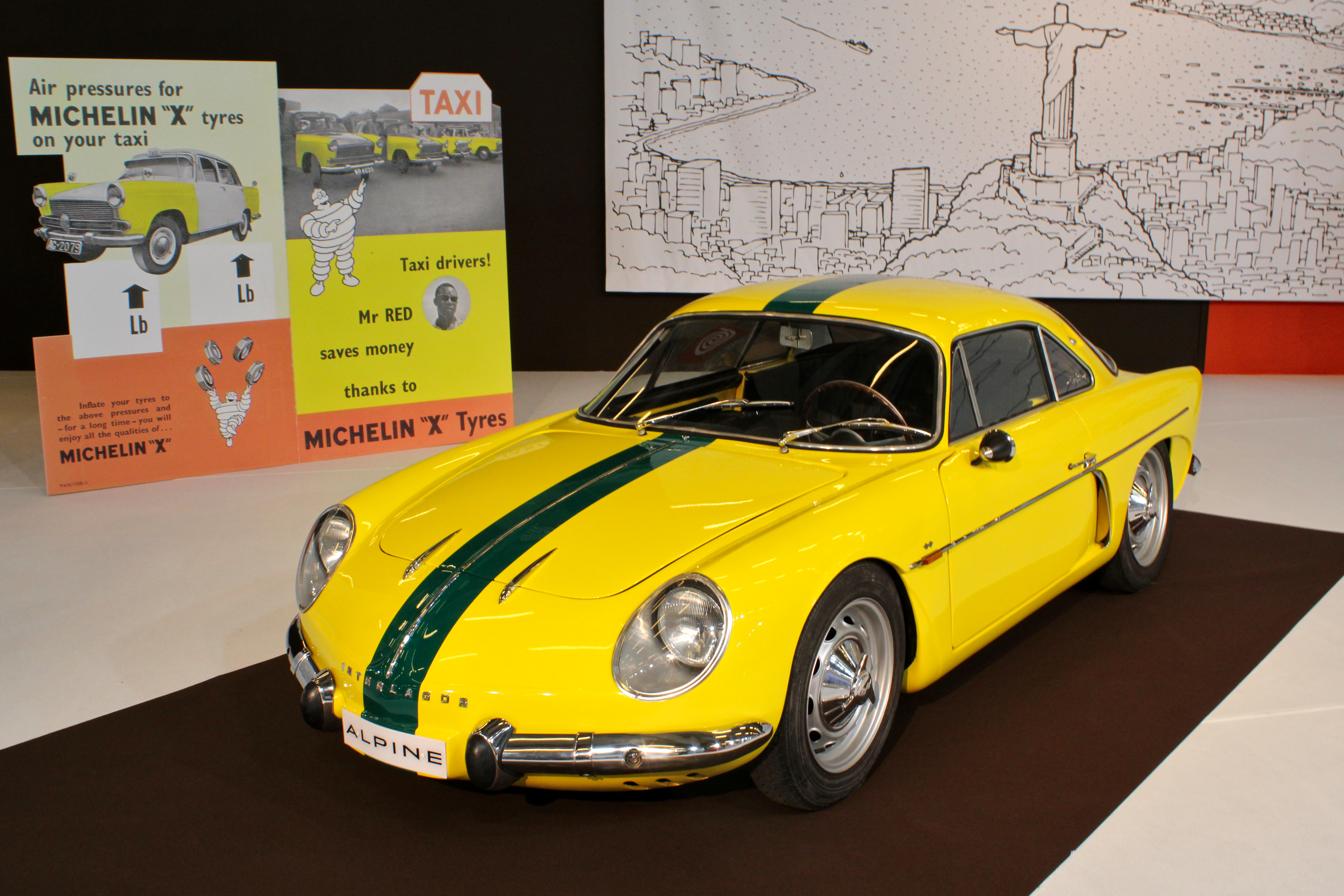
The Brazilian A108 – 1964 Willys Interlagos Berlinette

The A108 was also produced in Brazil, thanks to an agreement with Willys-Overland. Renamed as Willys Interlagos, the model was built in three versions: berlinette, coupé, and convertible. The car also had a successful racing career. From 1962 to 1966, a total of 822 Interlagos were made in São Bernardo do Campo, São Paulo.
