= Frédéric Comte =

French rally driver

Frédéric Daniel Comte (8 January 1976 – 4 September 2015) was a French rally driver.

He died in a crash at the Rallye Mont-Blanc Morzine, a round of the 2015 French Rally Championship. The Citroën Xsara that Comte and his wife and co-driver Angelique Comte were driving crashed on SS2. Frédéric Comte died at the scene whilst Angelique was badly injured. The rally was restarted at the behest of the driver's family.

Comte, a professional rally driver since 2001, was involved in another serious crash at the same event in 2006. He crashed out of the 31st rally of the Rallye des Vins Mâcon in 2014.
