= Chappe et Gessalin =

French coachbuilding company

Automobiles CG
- Industry: Automobile manufacturing
- Founded: 1966
- Founder: Abel, Albert and Louis Chappe; Jean Gessalin
- Defunct: 1974
- Fate: Bankrupted and closed, spring 1974
- Headquarters: Brie-Comte-Robert, France

Chappe et Gessalin is the short-form of the name of French coachbuilder "Carrosserie Chappe Frères et Gessalin". The company built automobile bodies and did contract assembly for other automobile manufacturers. It was also the parent of Automobiles CG, a French automobile maker founded in 1966 which built and sold complete cars under its own name.

== Early history ==
=== The 1930s and 1940s ===
The story of Chappe et Gessalin began in 1932, in the commune of Saint-Maur-des-Fosses near Paris. In that year the Carrosserie Chappe was founded by Jean Chappe. Working with him were his three sons, Abel, Albert and Louis and an apprentice, Amédée Gessalin. The shop did bodywork in both wood and steel.

The Second World War interrupted the company's activities for a time but they resumed at the end of hostilities. In 1946 Jean sold the carrosserie to his three sons. By that time Amédée was also a part of the family, having married the Chappe's eldest daughter Marie-Louise. The brothers added his name to the masthead and the company became "Carrosserie Chappe Frères et Gessalin". On the death of Amédée his son Jean took his father's place in the company.

The new company's work included commercial vehicles, a specialty being the construction of firetruck bodies on truck frames produced by Delahaye. They also carved out a niche doing more specialized work, such as bodywork in duralumin for Talbot and repairs on the Delahaye 135, 136 and Talbot T26 racing cars owned by Charles Pozzi, who would become a major dealer in Ferrari and Maserati cars.

=== The 1950s and 1960s ===
Before his death Amédée Gessalin taught his son how to draw and plan vehicles. Jean, an admirer of great Parisian designers Chapron and Figoni, worked on honing his own skills by attending evening classes taught by these men.

Chappe et Gessalin provided the aluminum bodywork for the Bosvin-Michel Speciale (BMS) throughout its many revisions. This car was designed and built by Camille Bosvin and driven by Guy Michel. It had a tubular-steel frame and was noteworthy in being one of the first cars to mount its engine (from a Renault 4CV) amidships. The BMS was a regular at Montlhéry, and won the Bol d'Or in 1952 and 1953.

Another project that Chappe et Gessalin were involved with was the SCVS-DB specials. These cars, given chassis numbers 1065 and 1066 by Renault, were initially a project of Renault dealers Jean Rédélé and Louis Pons. The cars were built by the small French firm of Deutsch-Bonnet with aluminum bodywork by Chappe et Gessalin. Power came from a Renault 4CV engine. One of the cars appeared at Le Mans in 1953.

In the early 1950s Chappe et Gessalin began experimenting with Fibre-reinforced plastic, (specifically Fiberglass). Using resins and techniques imported from the United States they started producing lightweight automobile bodies for sportscars and racing cars from a succession of independent fabricators and small manufacturers.

Deutsch-Bonnet themselves became a client of Chappe et Gessalin, who started by providing plastic noses for DB's monomil single-seaters and bodywork for other racers and would go on to build 200 copies of DB's "Le Mans" road car.

Even when the founders of Deutsch-Bonnet, René Bonnet and Charles Deutsch, ended their partnership in 1961 and established separate car companies (Automobiles René Bonnet and CD), they both continued to use lightweight fibreglass bodywork supplied by Chappe et Gessalin. René Bonnet went to them to develop bodywork for his new Djet. For Charles Deutsch Chappe et Gessalin produced the body of the Panhard-powered racing CDs and built 160 of the Panhard CD road cars.

The company also worked with less well-known companies such as Camille Martin's UMAP (1957-1959) and Raymond Gaillard's Arista.

Apart from the SCVS-DB cars, throughout the 1950s Jean Rédélé was involved in several automotive projects, including several Rédélé Spéciales, the Marquis, PlastiCar, and others. Rédélé crossed paths with Chappe et Gessalin often and would in time become their most famous client of all.

As a young man Jean Gessalin drew a small coupé based on Renault 4CV mechanicals as a design exercise for himself, which design he left behind while away performing his compulsory military service. On his return he discovered that his drawing has been turned into a car by his family.

A Renault concessionaire named Charles Escoffier saw the car and contacted his son-in-law, Jean Rédélé. 25 copies of the car were ordered from Chappe et Gessalin to be sold by Rédélé as the "Alpine". Renault backed the new company, and numbered the car "106". With the release of the A106 in 1955 the Alpine company was officially born.

In 1960, just as production of the A106 ended, Chappe et Gessalin moved their operations to the commune of Brie-Comte-Robert, still near Paris.

Chappe et Gessalin continued to build the A106 coupé and the subsequent A106 cabriolet, even though the cabriolet was styled by Michelotti. After 251 copies were built, the A106 was succeeded by the A108 and again, Chappe et Gessalin built the coupé, as well as a new 2+2. This time, though, Alpine opted to build the cabriolet version themselves. Rédélé had set up a new company named RDL to bring bodywork in-house with Alpine. Eventually the A108 was in turn replaced by the A110, but this time Chappe et Gessalin would only be doing bodywork, upholstery and paintwork for the A110 GT4 2+2. Final assembly was done at the Alpine works in Dieppe, although the car carried CG badges on its flanks.

== Automobiles CG ==
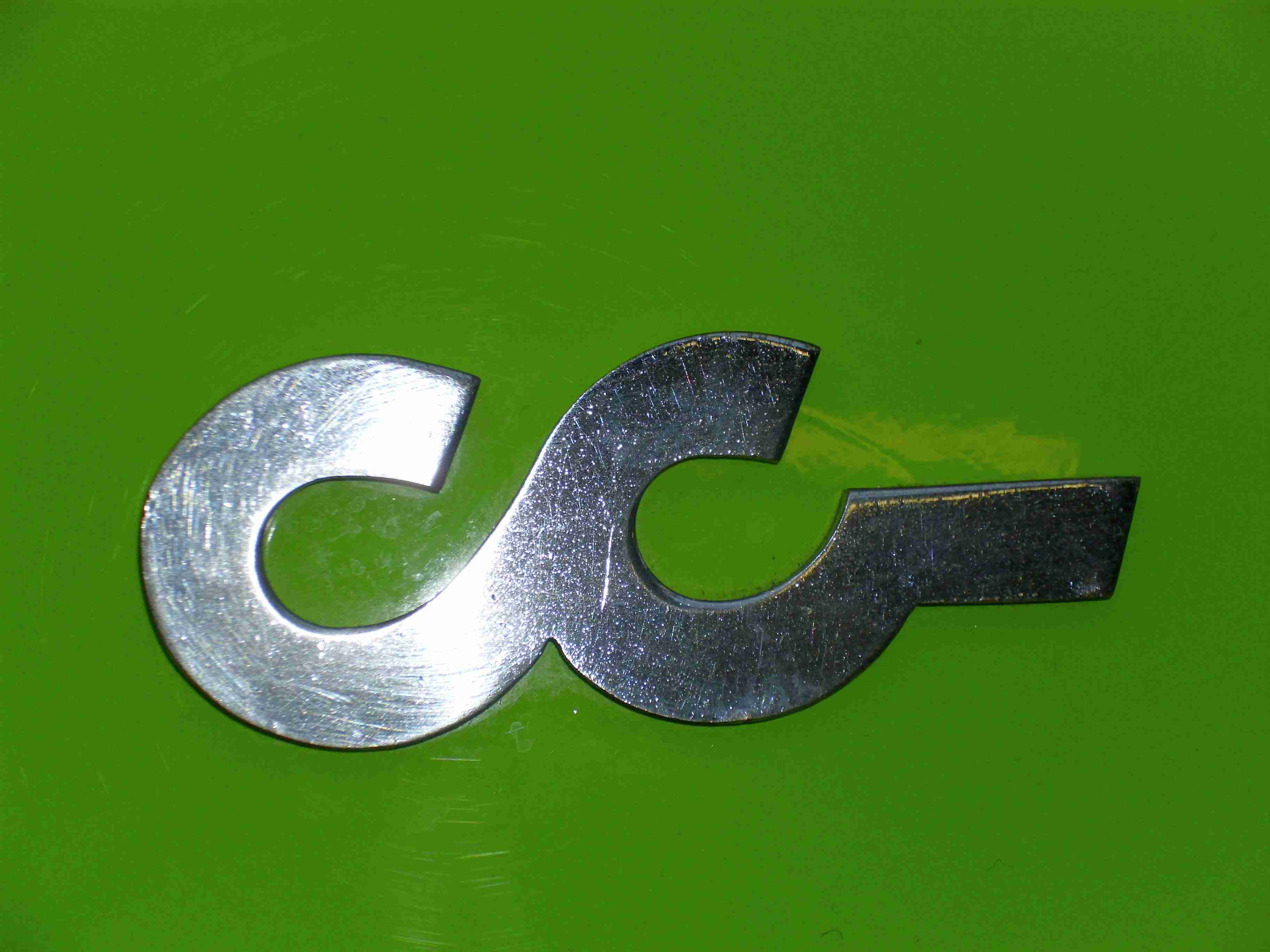
CG emblem

In the early 1960s, the staff at Chappe et Gessalin had grown to around 40 people.

While it continued working with a variety of car builders, demand from one of its largest customers, Alpine, was diminishing as Alpine's associated bodyworks, RDL, took over production of most Alpine models.

In 1964 management at Chappe et Gessalin began planning to become an automobile manufacturer in their own right. The new venture would be known as Automobiles CG ("CG" for Chappe et Gessalin). While there were already the skills in-house to do the styling and mechanical design of an entire car as well as produce the bodywork and chassis, they would need to source engines, transmissions, suspension parts, brakes and associated trim.

With Renault committed to Alpine and with Peugeot and Citroën (with Panhard) declining to participate, Automobiles CG turned to the Simca company and their pool of production mechanical components to supply its needs. Parts for the first CG came from a wrecked 1000 provided by Simca dealer Roger Civet.

The design of the first CG model began in 1965, and the car debuted at the 1966 Salon de l'Auto in Paris. Called the 1000 Spider, it was a small rear-engined convertible with a 2+2 fiberglass body that used powertrain and suspension components from the Simca 1000.

Since Jean Gessalin had designed what would become the very first Alpine, it was no surprise that the first CG bore a strong resemblance to its cousin from Dieppe, right down to the exposed hinges on the car.

The car received positive reviews for its appearance and the high level of fit and finish, but drivers were unimpressed by the 29.4 kilowatts (39.4 hp) produced by the 944 cc (57.6 cu in) engine and the high price.

CG later offered a high-performance version of the same engine that had been tuned by Michel Tapie from Rodez with power boosted by 50 percent to 58.9 kilowatts (79.0 hp).

Different variations of the original 1000 were produced over its three-year lifespan.

The 1000 Spider was replaced by the CG 1200S in 1968. The engine was now the same as that found in the Simca 1200S, and power was double that of the original 1000. It is during the time that the 1200S was being built that CG began to collaborate with Chrysler Europe (via the Simca division in France) in sportscar racing and rallying.

In 1972 the third and final major CG model entered production, the CG 1300. Power was now provided by the same engine found in the Simca 1000 Rallye 2. This model also received many upgrades to its body and trim.

== The sign of the Gallic Cockerel ==
Even though the first CG cars debuted in 1966, it was not until 1970 that an official emblem was designed for them. The image was based on the "Coq Gaulois" (the Gallic Cockerel). While "Coq Gaulois" and "Chappe et Gessalin" shared a common monogram, the image was also related to the company's address in Brie-Comte-Robert, which was on the "Rue du Coq Gaulois".

The designer of the emblem was Albert Uderzo, who is primarily known as the artist responsible for the Astérix comic series.

== CG Cars ==
=== CG 1000 (1966 - 1969, type A1000) ===
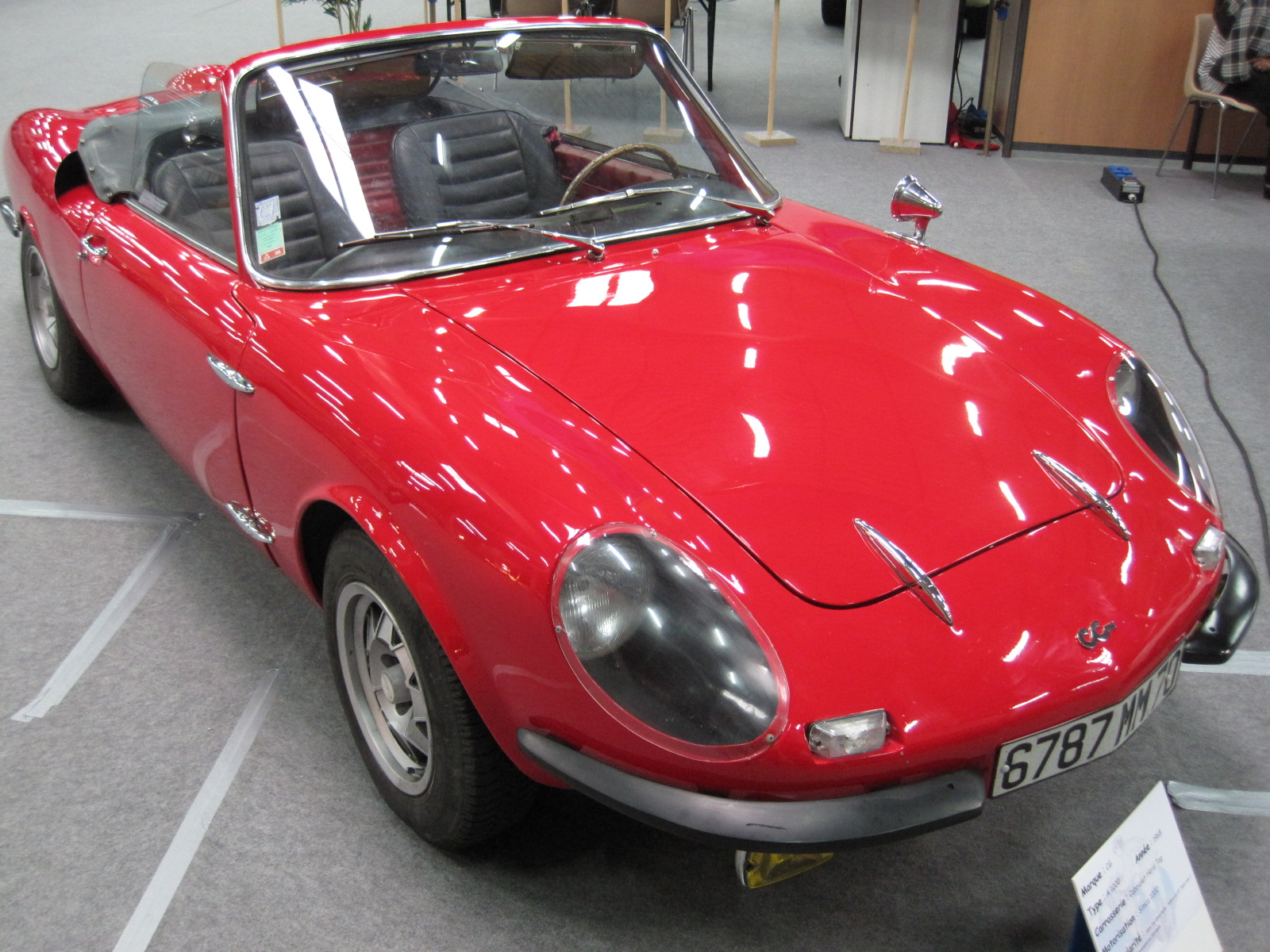
Spider CG 1000

The CG 1000 Spyder was unveiled at the 1966 Salon de l'Auto in Paris. The compact convertible had a fiberglass body mounted on a steel chassis with a deep "U" centre backbone and tube-and-sheetmetal outriggers. The chassis was designed by CG. Power came from a 944 cc inline 4-cylinder Simca Poissy engine. This motor had a cross-flow aluminum cylinder head and a cast-iron block with 5 main bearings. It was mounted in the rear of the car, canted over at 15 degrees from vertical and drove the wheels through a 4-speed transaxle that used Porsche-style synchronizers. The radiator was mounted at the rear beside the engine. Steering was worm-and-roller by Gemmer. Front suspension was by a lower transverse leaf spring and upper A-arms while at the rear were swing-axles with semi-trailing arms and coil springs. Brakes were disks on all four wheels, courtesy of the Simca 1000 Bertone coupé. The car, weighing 640 kg, featured styling and quality which was well received. Less well received was the vague steering and the meagre power from the stock engine. The price of the Spider was 16,990 francs.

One year after the release of the 1000 Spider a new, lower-price model debuted; the 1000 Sport. The price for this model was down to 14,990 francs. While the engine was the same 944 cc unit, it had been modified by engine tuner Michel Tapie from Rodez and power had been boosted by 50 percent to 58.9 kilowatts (79.0 hp). To bring the price down from that of the 1000 Spider, the roll-up glass windows were replaced by plastic sliders, the bumpers and hubcaps were removed, the dashboard was painted rather than covered and the seats were simple fibreglass tubs, changes which also brought the weight down to 600 kg. The 1000 Sport came with a removable hardtop.

In 1968 the 1000 Spider and 1000 Sport disappeared from the lineup, and two new cars were introduced, one of which was the CG 1000S. Trim on the 1000S was similar to the original 1000 Spider, but the engine displaced 1,118 cc (68.2 cu in) and produced 36.5 kW (49 hp). The 'S' was available as either a full coupé (non-removable) or convertible.

Dimensions: 4,024 mm (158.4 in) long, 1,540 mm (60.6 in) wide, 1,181 mm (46.5 in) high, 2,220 mm (87.4 in) wheelbase. Front track was 1,242 mm (48.9 in), rear track was 1,255 mm (49.4 in).

=== CG 1200 S (1968 - 1972, type B1200) and 548 ===
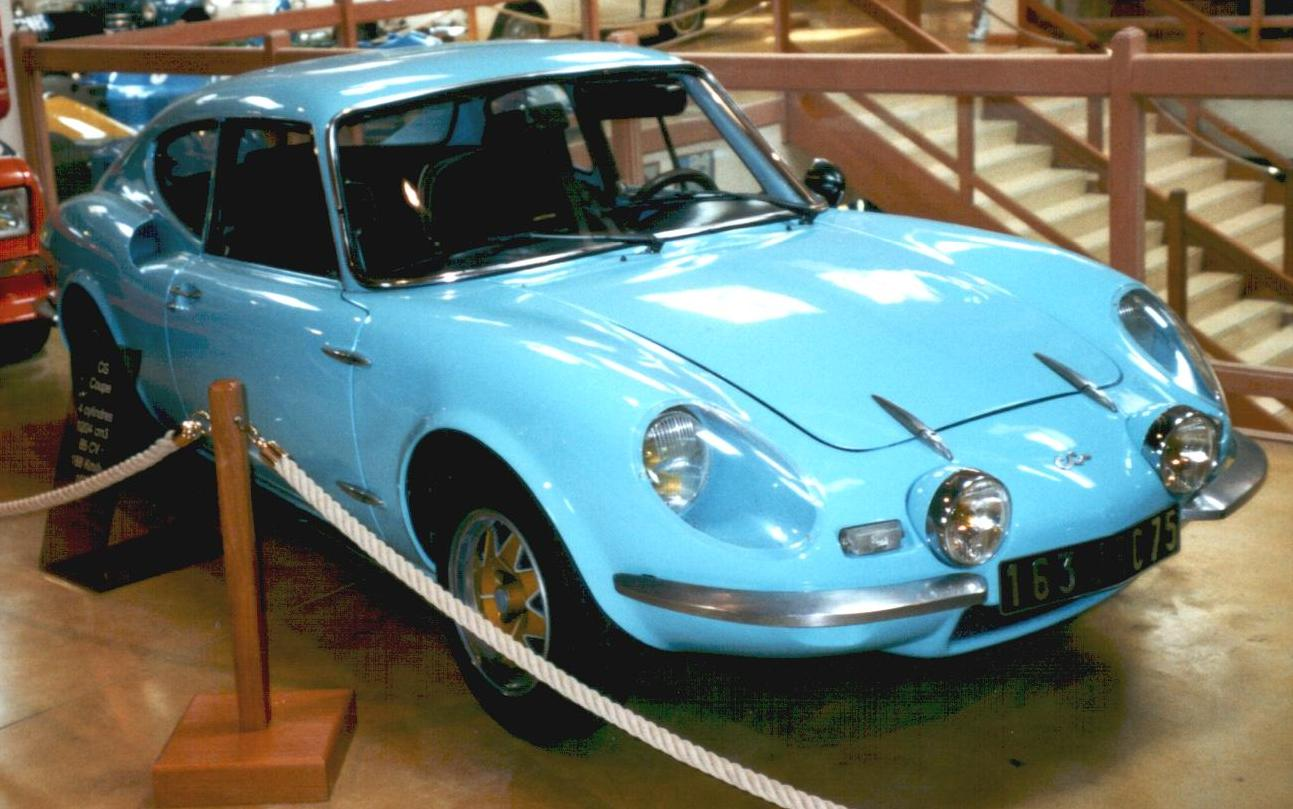
Coupé CG 1200 S

The other new model released in 1968 was the CG 1200S. This model was offered as a coupé or a convertible, although only 33 soft-tops were built by the factory. By upgrading to the engine from the Simca 1200 S coupé, CG was finally able to offer a sports car with performance comparable to the Alpine A110. With the 1,204 cc (73.5 cu in) engine power output was 59.7 kW (80 hp), twice that of the original 1000 Spider.

Brakes were disks all around but were now activated by a servo-assisted dual-circuit system. Rack-and-pinion steering replaced the old Gemmer system and anti-roll bars were added front and rear. There was also a new rear axle with dual movable joints as found on the B-series Simcas, allowing for negative camber setup. The rear end now also had two shock-absorbers per side. The radiator was moved to the front of the car, which now had an opening to admit cooling air. Weight was 660 kg

Dimensions: 4,024 mm (158.4 in) long, 1,540 mm (60.6 in) wide, 1,180 mm (46.5 in) high, 2,220 mm (87.4 in) wheelbase. Front track was 1,250 mm (49.2 in), rear track was 1,234 mm (48.6 in).

A special model intended for racing was developed out of the 1200S. This CG, called the 548, was a lightweight special, the name of the car also being its weight in kilograms.

To achieve this light weight many changes were made to the car. The lateral chassis beams were recessed into the main chassis and some lower-chassis details were restructured. The steel floor was replaced with aluminum and the engine and transaxle were mounted rigidly to two ties on the chassis, allowing the rear chassis structure to be removed completely, replaced only by a lateral rod tying the two sides of the chassis together. The bodywork was thinner than normal, all glass was replaced with acrylic or plexiglass deflectors, the bumperettes were removed and the gas filler neck was relocated. The air intake at the front was larger than on the 1200S, and a large mesh opening in the rear allowed engine heat to escape. The rear deck now ended in a full-width spoiler.

The 548 was available with an optional Constantin supercharger that brought power output up to 89.5 kW (120 hp).

=== CG 1300 (1972 - 1974, type C1300) ===
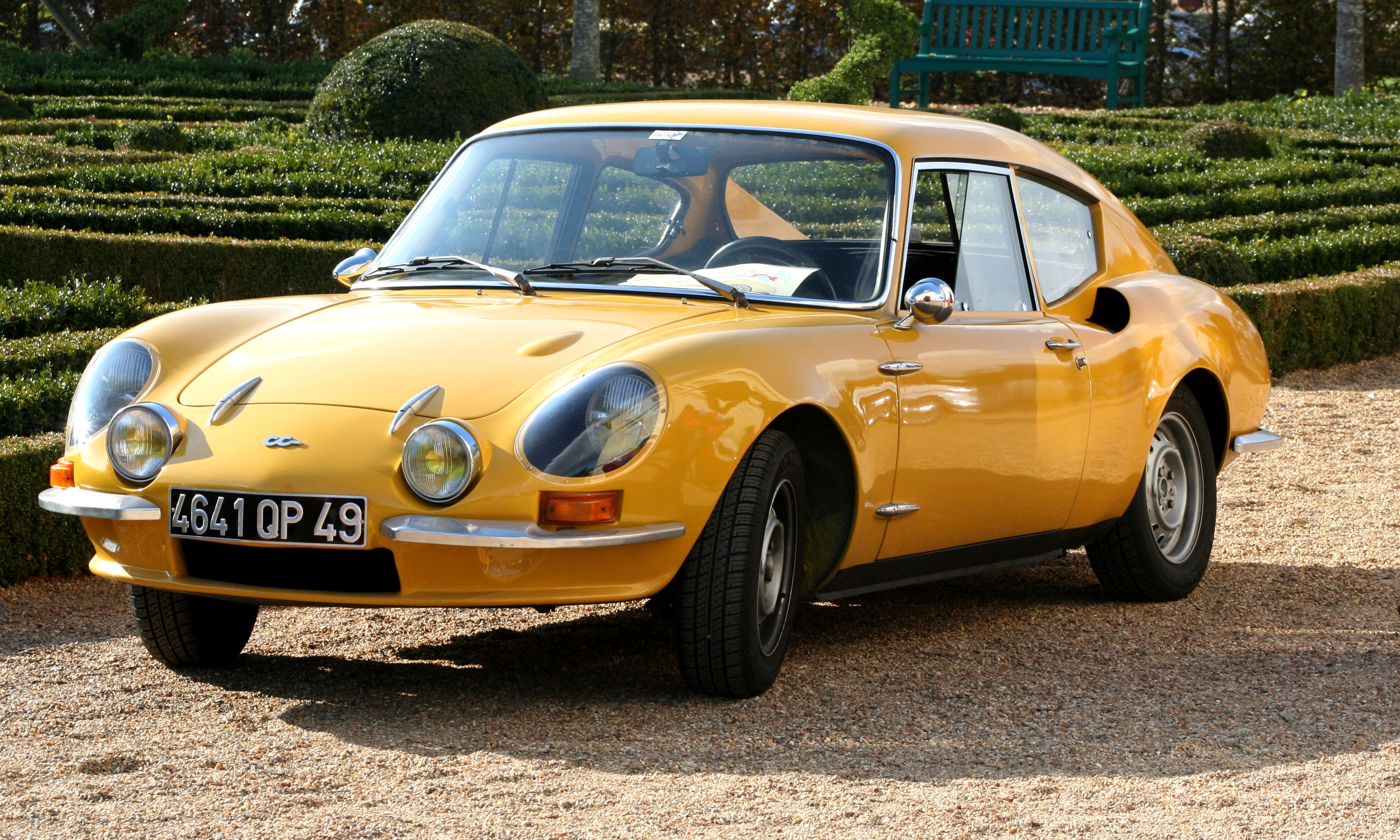
CG 1300

In 1972, the last regular GC road car, the CG 1300, was released. Once again, displacement had grown and the car now had the 1,294 cc (79.0 cu in) engine from the Simca Rallye 2. Power was initially 61.1 kW (82 hp) and torque was up to 80 ft-lbs. The car, only available as a coupé, had a new lower front valance with a spoiler and an even larger air intake for the radiator. Front indicator lamps were from a later model Simca 1000 and were mounted under the headlamps. From the doors back the rear quarter-panels had been reshaped and the rear quarter windows had also been changed. The tail of the car had been shortened by 64 millimetres (2.5 in). Taillights were rectangular units from the Simca 1100 and new cast bumperettes were used.

The 1300 would only be in production for one and one-half years, from 1972 to 1974.

Dimensions are: 3,960 mm (155.9 in) long, 1,540 mm (60.6 in) wide, 1,205 mm (47.4 in) high, 2,230 mm (87.8 in) wheelbase. Front track was 1,260 mm (49.6 in), rear track was 1,306 mm (51.4 in).

=== Model comparison ===
	CG type A1000 (fewer than 30 units)			CG type B1200 (about 280 units)			CG type C1300 (95 units)	
	Spider 1000	Sport 1000	Sport 1000/1000 S	Coupé and Spider 1200 S	Coupé and Spider 1200 S 1970 model	Coupé "548"	Coupé 1300	Coupé 1300 95 hp
Displacement	944 cc	944 cc	1118 cc	1204 cc	1204 cc	1204 cc	1294 cc	1294 cc
Bore × stroke (mm)	68 × 65	68 × 65	74 × 65	74 × 70	74 × 70	74 × 70	76.7 × 70	76.7 × 70
Power	29.4 kW (39.4 hp) at 5400 rpm	29.4 kW (39.4 hp) at 5400 rpm	36.1 kW (48.4 hp) at 5600 rpm	58.9 kW (79.0 hp) at 6000 rpm	62.5 kW (83.8 hp) at 6200 rpm	88.3 kW (118.4 hp) at 6200 rpm	60.3 kW (80.9 hp) at 6000 rpm	69.9 kW (93.7 hp) at 6400 rpm
Torque	74.5 N⋅m (54.9 lb⋅ft) at 3400 rpm	74.5 N⋅m (54.9 lb⋅ft) at 3400 rpm	82.9 N⋅m (61.1 lb⋅ft) at 3600 rpm	103 N⋅m (76.0 lb⋅ft) at 4500 rpm	105.4 N⋅m (77.7 lb⋅ft) at 4500 rpm	-	107.9 N⋅m (79.6 lb⋅ft) at 4400 rpm	115.7 N⋅m (85.3 lb⋅ft) at 4560 rpm
Weight	640 kg (1,411.0 lb)	600 kg (1,322.8 lb)	620 kg (1,366.9 lb)	660 kg (1,455.1 lb)	660 kg (1,455.1 lb)	548 kg (1,208.1 lb)	660 kg (1,455.1 lb)	670 kg (1,477.1 lb)
Top speed	-	150 km/h (93 mph)	160 km/h (99 mph)	185 km/h (115 mph)	188 km/h (117 mph)	-	185 km/h (115 mph)	195 km/h (121 mph)
Standing Kilometre	-	37.0 s	35.6 s	31.5 s	31.3 s	27.0 s	31.5 s	30.5 s
Price (year)	16 900 F (1967)	14 990 F (1967)	18 990 F (1968)	21 480/21 980 F (1968)	22 726/23 255 F (1970)	35 000 F (1971)	27 500 F (1973)	30 232 F (1973)

== The end of the road ==
The GC 1300 would be the last car produced at Chappe et Gessalin. In 1964 Matra had acquired the assets of the René-Bonnet company, and by 1970 Matra themselves were 50% owned by Chrysler. When Simca selected Matra's Bagheera as the successor to the Bertone-designed Simca 1200S this eclipsed any hopes CG may have had to raise their own profile within Simca.

In 1973 the oil crisis struck. In France, Prime Minister Pierre Messmer announced national speed-limits and, most devastatingly, a one-year ban on motor-racing.

The last CG 1300s were delivered in the spring of 1974, after which the small company of Brie-Comte-Robert closed its doors permanently.

Following the closure of the CG plant, Jean-Michel Ribot-Bruno's Coulimmiers-based Geriplast company took over the after-sales service and repair of the CG bodywork. The CG construction equipment and molds were transferred to GERIPLAST at the end of 1974. Geriplast would use these to itself become a manufacturer of GERIPLAST barquettes (modified CG spiders) and then GERI barquettes and single-seaters, developed jointly with Michel Bonenfant.

In 2016 there was a 50th anniversary retrospective of CG held at the Cite de l'Automobile.

== CG in competition ==
While CGs had been raced prior to its release, the lightweight 548 was the first CG built expressly for motor racing.

In April 1969 Henri Chemin came to Chrysler, rejoining his former boss from Ford France, William Reiber. Chemin was appointed head of the competition department and given three objectives:

1. Start winning races, including rallies, as soon as possible
2. Rebuild the image of Simca's brand with young drivers
3. Add to Matra's already impressive list of victories

Chemin campaigned a 1200XS coupé with the new 1812 cc OHC Simca Type 180 engine in a series of rallyes, but the car could not overcome the Alpines. Towards the end of the year CG agreed to collaborate with the Simca division of Chrysler Europe in a new venture to be called Simca-CG. Simca-CG would go racing with a jointly-developed car to be called the Simca-CG Proto MC.

Although some histories say that the Proto MC's chassis was designed by Matra, there is little concrete evidence for the company's direct involvement. An indirect connection to Matra was established when, through the influence of Simca, Matra engineer Bernard Boyer was assigned to the development team. Boyer was also a former employee of Chappe et Gessalin and son-in-law of Albert Chappe.

The Simca-CG Proto MC was a mid-engined (MC standing for "Moteur Centrale") two-seater car with a monocoque-and-tubular hybrid chassis. The engine was the Chrysler/Simca Type 180 that had been used in the 1200XS coupés. Early cars made do with the 1812 cc engine but later cars would have 2156 cc, 2207 cc and 2310 cc versions of the Type 180 motor. The transaxle came from a Porsche 914.

Bodywork for the first cars was derived from the existing molds for the CG 1200S and 548 models. Later spiders would have as much as 200 mm (7.9 in) cut from their length, and one car was built with a truncated cabin that gave it the appearance of a small truck.

The project was launched in February 1970, design work was completed by the end of May and the car was built and track testing was starting by the end of July.

Its first race was on August 8, 1970 at Mont-Dore, and the car's first Championship win was at the 1970 Critérium des Cévennes, with Gérard Larrousse driving.

For the 1972 season Simca brought in engine specialists JRD, who increased the displacement and made other modifications to increase the power output and deal with reliability issues arising from the greater stresses.

Over the course of three seasons the MC posted victories in 32 out of 49 races entered.

Drivers were Bernard Fiorentino, Gérard Larrousse, Michel Saliba and Philippe Renaudât.

In April 1973, Simca Chrysler dissolved the competition department, leaving only Matra Sports to continue in Sports-Prototypes racing.

Many (non-MC) CGs continued to be active in historic racing. Several of these cars were described as "CG 1600s", but these appear to have been custom engine swaps rather than factory originals.

In 2012, with the approval of Jean Gessalin and support from Bernard Chappe, Didier Malga launched "CG Sport", an attempt to revive the brand as a competition group.
