= Rallye Mont-Blanc Morzine =

The Rallye Mont-Blanc Morzine is a yearly motor rally held in the month of September in Morzine, Haute-Savoie. It is often held as part of the French Rally Championship. It began in 1947 with the Rally Paris-Evian, and it eventually became the Rallye. Formerly held in Annecy, this event moved to Morzine in 1989 where it adopted its current name in 1994.

One of the oldest continuing rallies in France, this rally has attracted famous names from the world of rally driving such as Sébastien Loeb, Stéphane Sarrazin, Philippe Bugalski and Pierre Campana. All the winners to date have been French with the exceptions of the Belgian Lucien Bianchi and Swiss Jean Krucker. Bugalski is the most successful driver in the events history with five wins between 1993 and 2000.

As well as part of the French Rally Championship, the Rallye Mont-Blanc was included in the European Rally Championship from 1988 to 1996.

== Recent years ==
=== 2011 ===
In 2011, Pierre Campana, driving the same Mini Cooper WRC that won the Richard Burns Memorial Rally in England, added to his success. He took the lead after the previous leader Dany Snobeck crashed out. Gilles Nantet and Ludovic Gal were second and third respectively and it was Nantet's maiden ascent to the podium.

=== 2012 ===
In 2012, Stéphane Sarrazin who won previously in 2004 took another commanding victory in the Peugeot 307 WRC with co-driver Benjamin Veillas.

=== 2013 ===
In 2013, Julien Maurin won for the first time with co-driver Nicolas Klinger. Eric Brunson and Pierre Roché joined him on the podium. Maurin was the leader since SS2.

=== 2014 ===
In 2014, Julien Maurin won for the second consecutive time, also leading from the second stage and beating rival competitors. The second placed driver Jean-Marie Cuoq was joined on the podium by Lionel Baud.

=== 2015 ===
In 2015, the 67th running of this event, Stéphane Sarrazin won it for the third time, but the veteran driver Frédéric Comte died in a crash on SS2. After the agreement of the family, the rally was relaunched. Joining Sarrazin and his co-driver Jacques-Julien Renucci on the podium was Jean-Marie Cuoq, the runner-up from last year, and Yoann Bonato. The third placed co-driver, Denis Giraudet, made it on the podium for the first time in 21 years.

=== 2016 ===
In 2016, this rally was won for the first time by Yoann Bonato driving a Citroën DS3 R5. Earlier his fellow Frenchman Sylvain Michel battled with him for the lead, but had fallen down to eleventh by the start of the second leg, eliminating any hopes of victory.

== List of winners ==
Sourced in part from:

| Season | Winner | Car |
|---|---|---|
| 1957 | (France) Claude Storez | Porsche 356 Carrera |
| 1958 | (France) Claude Storez | Porsche 356 Carrera |
| 1959 | (France) Bernard Consten | Alfa Romeo |
| 1960; 1961 | not held | |
| 1962 | (France) René Trautmann | Austin Cooper |
| 1963 | (France) René Trautmann | Citroën DS 19 |
| 1964 - 1968 | not held | |
| 1969 | (France) Jean-Claude Andruet | Alpine A110 1300 |
| 1970 | (France) Jean-François Piot | Ford Escort Twin Cam |
| 1971 | (France) Bernard Fiorentino | Simca CG MC 2200 Coupé |
| 1972 | (France) Bernard Darniche | Alpine A110 1800 |
| 1973 | (France) Bernard Fiorentino | Simca CG |
| 1974 | (France) Jacques Henry | Alpine A110 1800 |
| 1975 | (France) Francis Vincent | Alfa Romeo 2000 GTV |
| 1976 | (France) Bruno Saby | Alpine A110 1800 |
| 1977 | (France) Bernard Béguin | Alpine A310 1800 |
| 1978 | (France) Jan-Hug Hazard | Porsche 911 Carrera |
| 1979 | (Switzerland) Jean Krucker | Porsche 911 Carrera RS |
| 1980 | (France) Jean Ragnotti | Renault 5 Alpine |
| 1981 | (France) Bruno Saby | Renault 5 Turbo |
| 1982 | (France) Bruno Saby | Renault 5 Turbo |
| 1983 | (France) Francis Vincent | Ferrari 308 GTB |
| 1984 | (France) Jean Ragnotti | Renault 5 Turbo |
| 1985 | (France) François Chatriot | Renault 5 Maxi Turbo |
| 1986 | (France) Didier Auriol | MG Metro 6R4 |
| 1987 | (France) Didier Auriol | Ford Sierra RS Cosworth |
| 1988 | (France) Didier Auriol | Ford Sierra RS Cosworth |
| 1989 | (France) François Chatriot | BMW M3 |
| 1990 | (France) Bruno Saby | Lancia Delta Integrale 16V |
| 1991 | (France) Yves Loubet | Lancia Delta Integrale 16V |
| 1992 | (France) Bernard Béguin | Ford Sierra RS Cosworth 4x4 |
| 1993 | (France) Philippe Bugalski | Lancia Delta HF Integrale |
| 1994 | (France) François Chatriot | Toyota Celica Turbo 4WD |
| 1995 | (France) Philippe Bugalski | Renault Clio Maxi |
| 1996 | (France) Gilles Panizzi | Peugeot 306 Maxi |
| 1997 | (France) Philippe Bugalski | Renault Mégane Maxi |
| 1998 | (France) Simon Jean-Joseph | Subaru Impreza 555 |
| 1999 | (France) Philippe Bugalski | Citroën Xsara Kit Car |
| 2000 | (France) Philippe Bugalski | Citroën Xsara T4 |
| 2001 | (France) Sébastien Loeb | Citroën Xsara Kit Car |
| 2002 | (France) Cédric Robert | Peugeot 206 S1600 |
| 2003 | (France) Alexandre Bengué | Peugeot 206 WRC |
| 2004 | (France) Stéphane Sarrazin | Subaru Impreza WRC |
| 2005 | (France) Nicolas Bernardi | Peugeot 206 WRC |
| 2006 | (France) Jérôme Grosset-Janin | Citroën Xsara WRC |
| 2007 | (France) Jean-Marie Cuoq | Peugeot 307 WRC |
| 2008 | (France) Dany Snobeck | Peugeot 307 WRC |
| 2009 | (France) Patrick Henry | Peugeot 206 WRC |
| 2010 | (France) Dany Snobeck | Peugeot 307 WRC |
| 2011 | (France) Pierre Campana | Mini John Cooper Works WRC |
| 2012 | (France) Stéphane Sarrazin | Peugeot 307 WRC |
| 2013 | (France) Julien Maurin | Ford Fiesta RS WRC |
| 2014 | (France) Julien Maurin | Ford Fiesta RS WRC |
| 2015 | (France) Stéphane Sarrazin | Ford Fiesta RS WRC |
| 2016 | (France) Yoann Bonato | Citroën DS3 R5 |
| 2017 | (France) Yoann Bonato | Citroën DS3 R5 |

== Fatalities ==
- In 1999, driver Mark Champeau died in a road accident during the reconnaissance.
- In 2015, driver Frédéric Comte died on Stage 2 after a big accident. His accident came in the wake of two other similar tragedies that happened the same week. One of rally's darkest weeks that blackened preparations for Rally Australia.
