= Sabelt =

Italian car seat and seat belt manufacturer

Sabelt S.p.A.
- Type: Private
- Industry: Automotive
- Founded: 1972
- Founder: Piero Marsiaj and Giorgio Marsiaj
- Headquarters: Moncalieri, Turin, Italy
- Products: Racing products (seat belts, seats, racewear), oem (seats), special applications (military, aviation, aerospace, transportation)
- Website: www.sabelt.com

Sabelt S.p.A. is an Italian company founded in 1972 by Piero and Giorgio Marsiaj, that designs and manufactures original equipment (OEM) car seats, seat belts, motorsport products, and seatbelts for military, aviation, and aerospace applications. The company's name originates from the English word Safety Belt.

Sabelt sells ultralight racing suits, carbon fiber seats that adapt to the driver and seat belts for cars of all types of racing. From the world of motorsport, it has developed a range of sports seats for car manufacturers.

Each seat is designed and created exclusively by Sabelt in collaboration with its customers, the car manufacturers. Its main partners are: Ferrari, McLaren, Alpine, Abarth, Alfa Romeo, Cupra, Audi, Jaguar, Maserati and Aston Martin.

Sabelt also creates safety belts for niche markets, including the military, aviation, and aerospace. Since 2010, Sabelt has been the supplier of Thales Alenia Space Italia for the restraint systems of the Cygnus Orbital-ATK module (belts and nets).

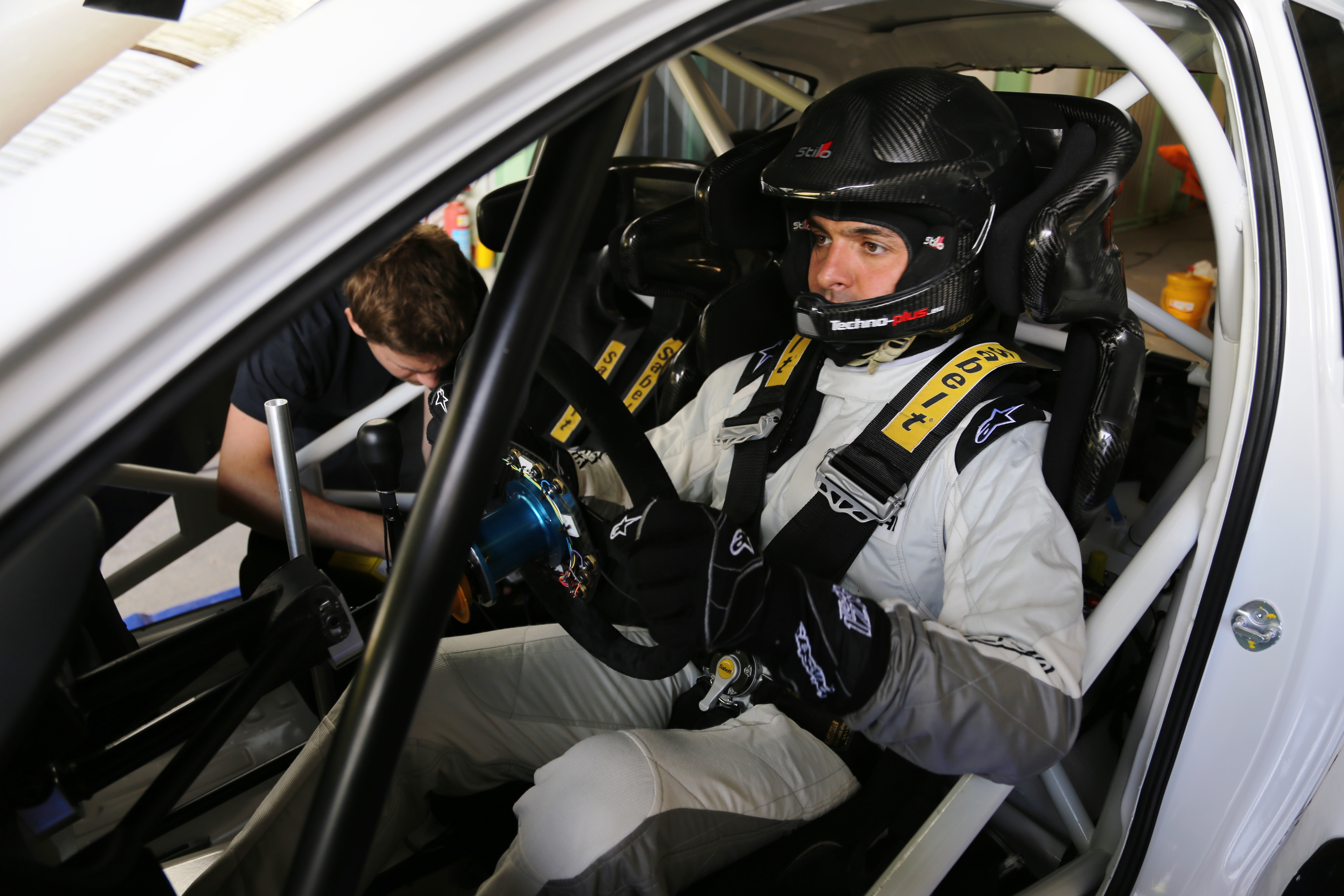
Sabelt racing harnesses in a Hyundai i20 WRC

Today Sabelt has 330 employees divided into 2 factories in Moncalieri.

== History ==
Sabelt was founded in 1972 by Piero and Giorgio Marsiaj to produce seat belts for the car Industry. In the mid 1970s Sabelt began supplying seat belts for Formula 1 and WRC. In 1981 safety belts became mandatory for new car models in Italy and few years later Sabelt opened a plant in Poland. In the mid 2000s, Sabelt supplied seats for Ferrari, McLaren, Alpine, Abarth, Jaguar, Alfa Romeo and Chrysler.
