= Jean Rédélé =

French racing driver (1922–2007)

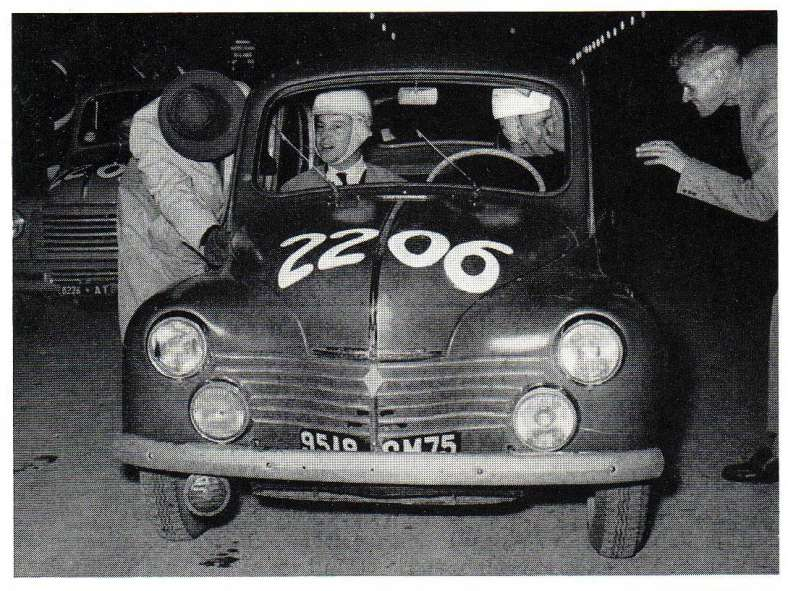
1954-05-01 Mille Miglia Renault 4CV Rédélé Pons.jpg

Jean Rédélé (17 May 1922, Dieppe, Seine-Maritime – 10 August 2007 Paris), was an automotive pioneer, pilot and founder of the French automotive brand Alpine.

With a HEC diploma, he was the youngest Renault dealer in France, with a dealership installed in Dieppe. Rédélé first started (1950) rallying Dieppe-Rouen with a 4 CV, because he considered the small French car had a great rallying potential. This first race was a first victory, and he decided to continue. After a failed Monte Carlo Rally Rédelé started racing in the French Alps. In the Alps he had his greatest victories. That's why his cars bore the brand "Alpine" as a memento of his first victory in the 1954 Coupe des Alpes.

Jean Rédélé's first car was a 4CV coach, in 1952. Then the second special 4CV spéciale "The Marquis" was presented at the New York car show in 1954, without posterity.

He created the brand Alpine on 1955. The first model is the A106 coach. The 106 is a reference to the power pack of the 4CV of the 1060 series. In 1971 Alpine won its first European title for European rallies. In 1973 Alpine was the first world champion of rallying with 155 points followed by Fiat (89) and Ford (76).
