= Alpine A110-50 =

Concept car produced by Renault which led to the 2017 continuation of the Alpine A110

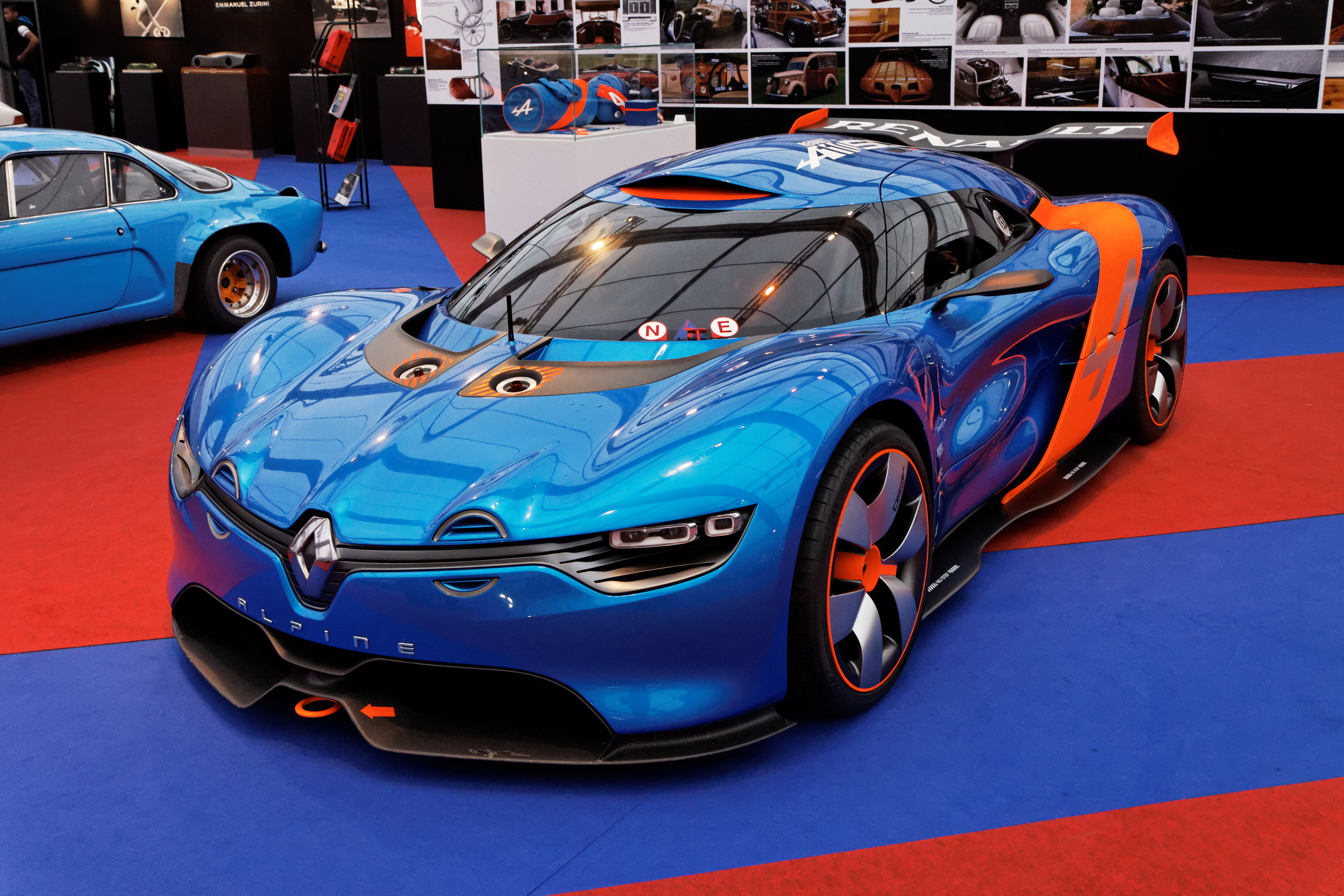

Overview
- Manufacturer: Alpine
- Production: 2012 (Concept car)
- Designer: Yann Jarsalle

Body and chassis
- Class: Racing car
- Body style: 2-door coupe
- Layout: Rear mid-engine, rear-wheel-drive layout
- Platform: Sport Mégane Trophy

Powertrain
- Engine: 3.5-liter Nissan-Renault VQ35DE V6
- Transmission: 6-speed semi-automatic sequential

Dimensions
- Curb weight: 1,940 lb (880 kg)

Chronology
- Predecessor: Alpine A110
- Successor: Alpine A110 (2017)

The Alpine A110-50 (codenamed ZAR for "Alpine revival", with Z being the letter used for Renault concepts) is a concept racing car created by Renault to commemorate the 50th anniversary of the 1962 Alpine A110 It debuted at Monaco's GP circuit, where Renault Chief Operating Officer Carlos Tavares raced the A110-50 for four laps of the Monaco track.

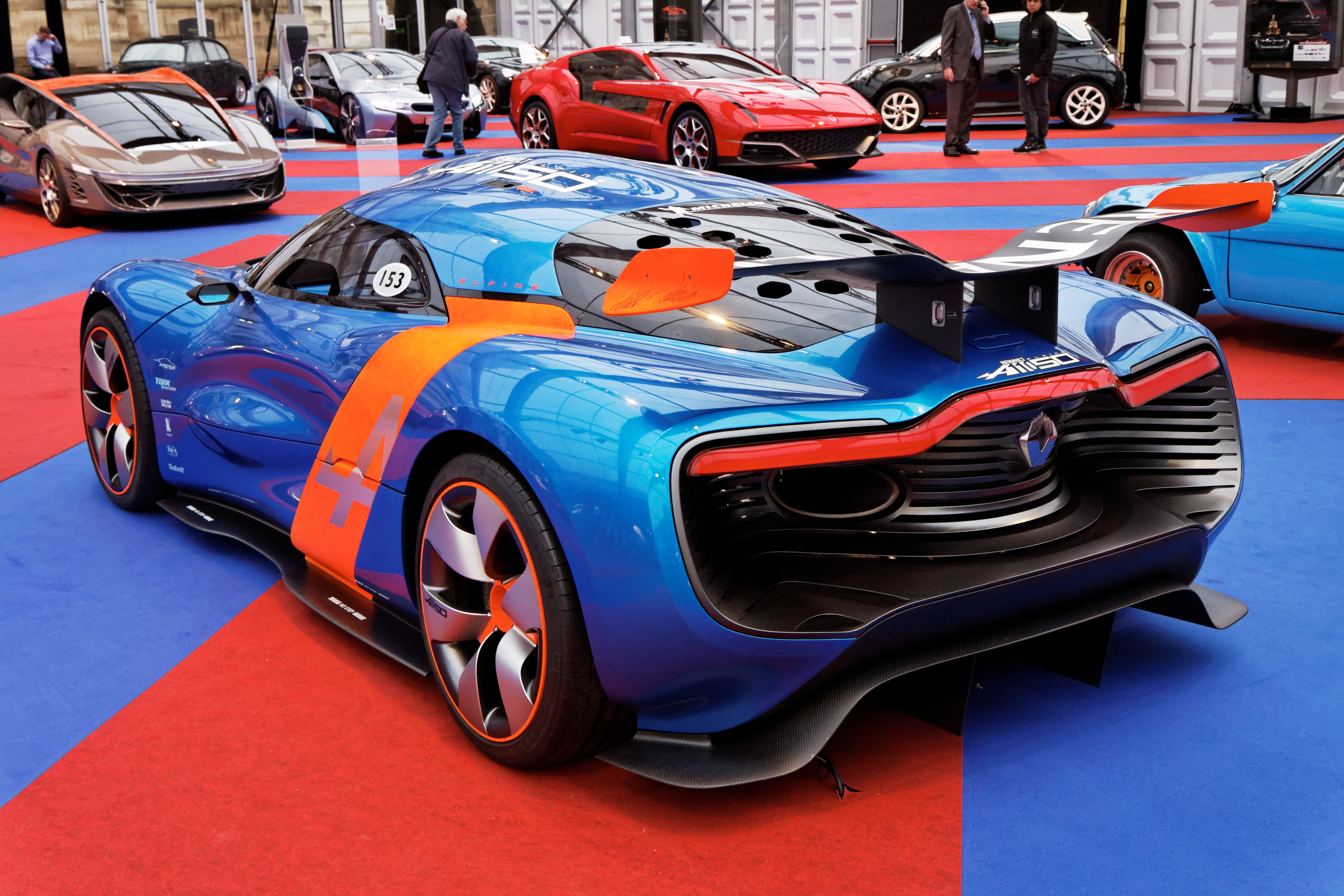
Rear view

The Alpine A110-50 has all carbonfibre bodywork, a mid-engine layout, and tubular frame. It is built upon the same platform and shares its mechanicals with the Sport Mégane Trophy race car. Because the A110-50's height is lower than that of Mégane Trophy, the roll cage and bracing in the engine bay were lowered in the workshop of Tork Engineering. The entire car weighs 1,940 lb (880 kg), and its weight distribution is 47.8 percent front and 52.2 percent rear. With a naturally aspirated 395-hp variation of the Mégane Trophy's 3.5-liter V6 based on the Nissan VQ engine, it has a 456bhp/ton power-to-weight ratio. The inlet manifold is fed by a new roof-mounted air intake which broadens the engine's power band, with additional horsepower at all engine speeds.

A110-50's front splitter and rear diffuser generate ground effect, and account for a third of the car's downforce, while the other two-thirds comes from the rear wing. The body can be raised with integrated pneumatic jacks for easier servicing. The steering wheel features a color screen and employs the same technology as a Formula Renault 3.5 single-seat race car. The A110-50 has highly adjustable double wishbone suspension with Sachs dampers. It utilises a six-speed semi-automatic sequential gearbox, which slots longitudinally behind the engine and incorporates a mechanical limited-slip differential.

Designer Yann Jarsalle and Concept and Show Car Director Axel Breun based the A110-50 on the same design language introduced with the DEZIR concept car, but incorporated several design cues from the original A110. These include: half-domed additional headlights with yellow tinted LED lighting; air intakes on each side echo the ducts on the rear wheel arches of the Berlinette; and painting the body in a modern version of the signature Alpine blue. The aerodynamic body was designed using a process called computational fluid dynamics. Its relation to the DeZir is clearly seen in its design, excluding the electric motor and butterfly doors.

== See also ==
- Alpine A110
- Alpine A110 (2017)
- Renault DeZir
- Mégane Renault Sport
- Nissan VQ engine
