= Automobiles Alpine =

French car manufacturer

Société des Automobiles Alpine SAS
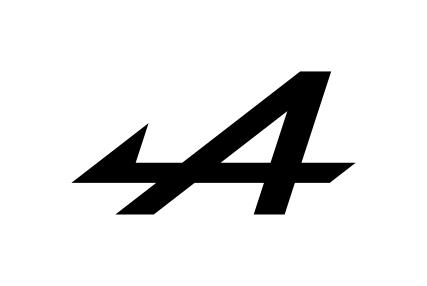

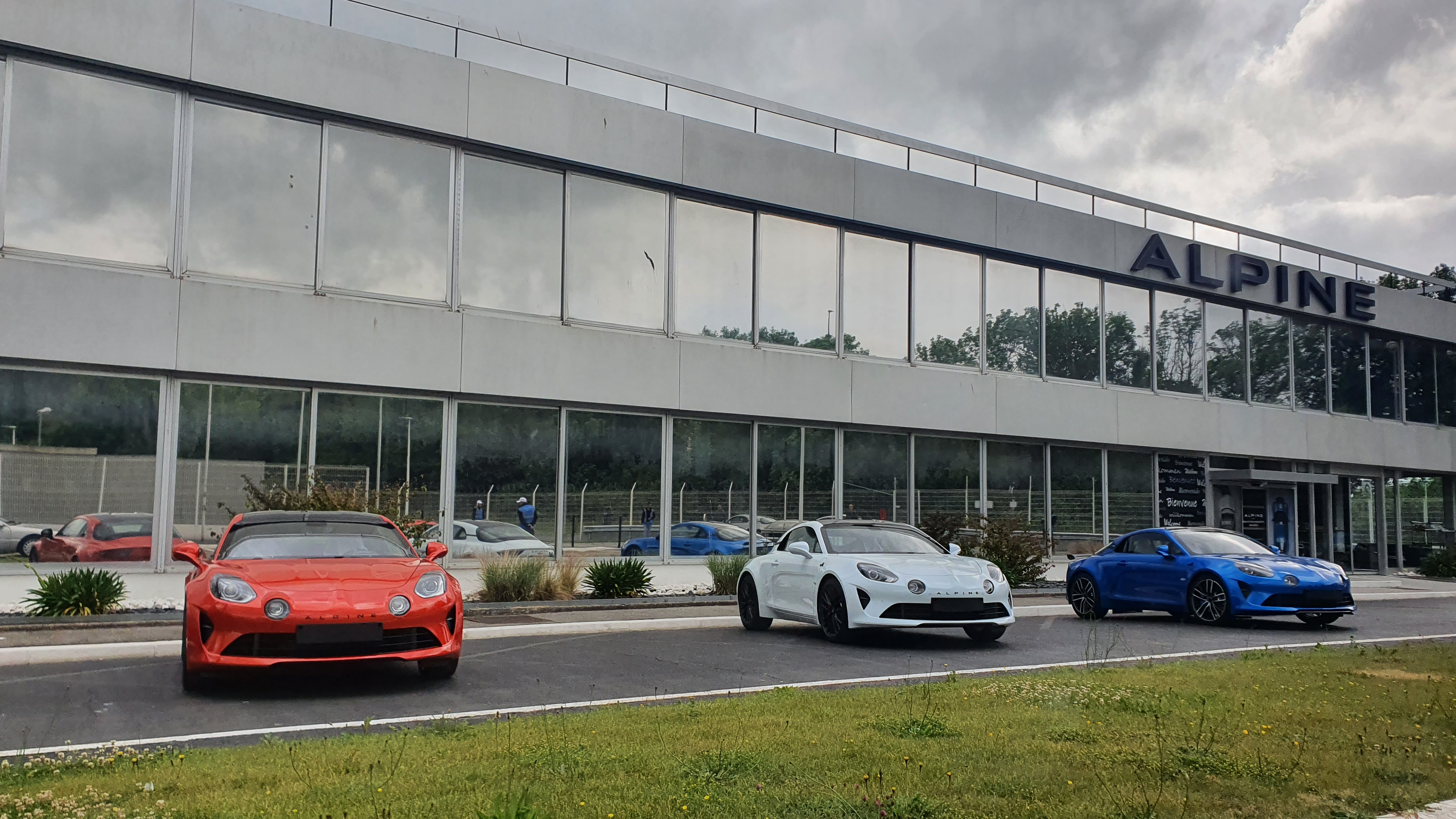
- Alpine plant in Dieppe
- Type: Subsidiary
- Industry: Automotive
- Founded: 22 June 1955; 71 years ago (Note: Legally registered on 6 July 1955.)
- Founder: Jean Rédélé
- Headquarters: Dieppe, France
- Key people: Philippe Krief (CEO of the Alpine company and business unit)
- Products: Cars
- Production output: ▲10,970 vehicles (2025)
- Number of employees: 356 (2021)
- Parent: Renault Group
- Divisions: Alpine Cars; Alpine Racing (Alpine Endurance Team, Alpine F1 Team, customer racing and one-make series organisation)
- Website: www.alpinecars.com

Société des Automobiles Alpine SAS, commonly known as Alpine (/ˈælpɪn/, French: [alpin]), is a French manufacturer of sports cars and racing cars established in 1955. The Alpine car marque was created in 1954.

Jean Rédélé, the founder of Alpine, was originally a Dieppe garage proprietor who began to achieve success in motorsport with the Renault 4CV, one of the few French cars produced after the Second World War. The company has been closely associated with Renault (which became a strategic partner along with Nissan in 1999) throughout its history, and was bought by it in 1973.

The Alpine competition department merged into Renault Sport in 1976. Renault phased out the Alpine brand in 1995, but relaunched it with the 2017 introduction of the new Alpine A110. Renault later merged Renault Sport again into Alpine in January 2021, forming an Alpine business unit.

Alpine became an electric vehicle brand with the 2024 introduction of the new Alpine A290. As part of its global expansion, Alpine in 2023 announced plans to enter the North American market in 2027 with a mid-size electric crossover and a large electric SUV.

== History ==
=== Early days ===
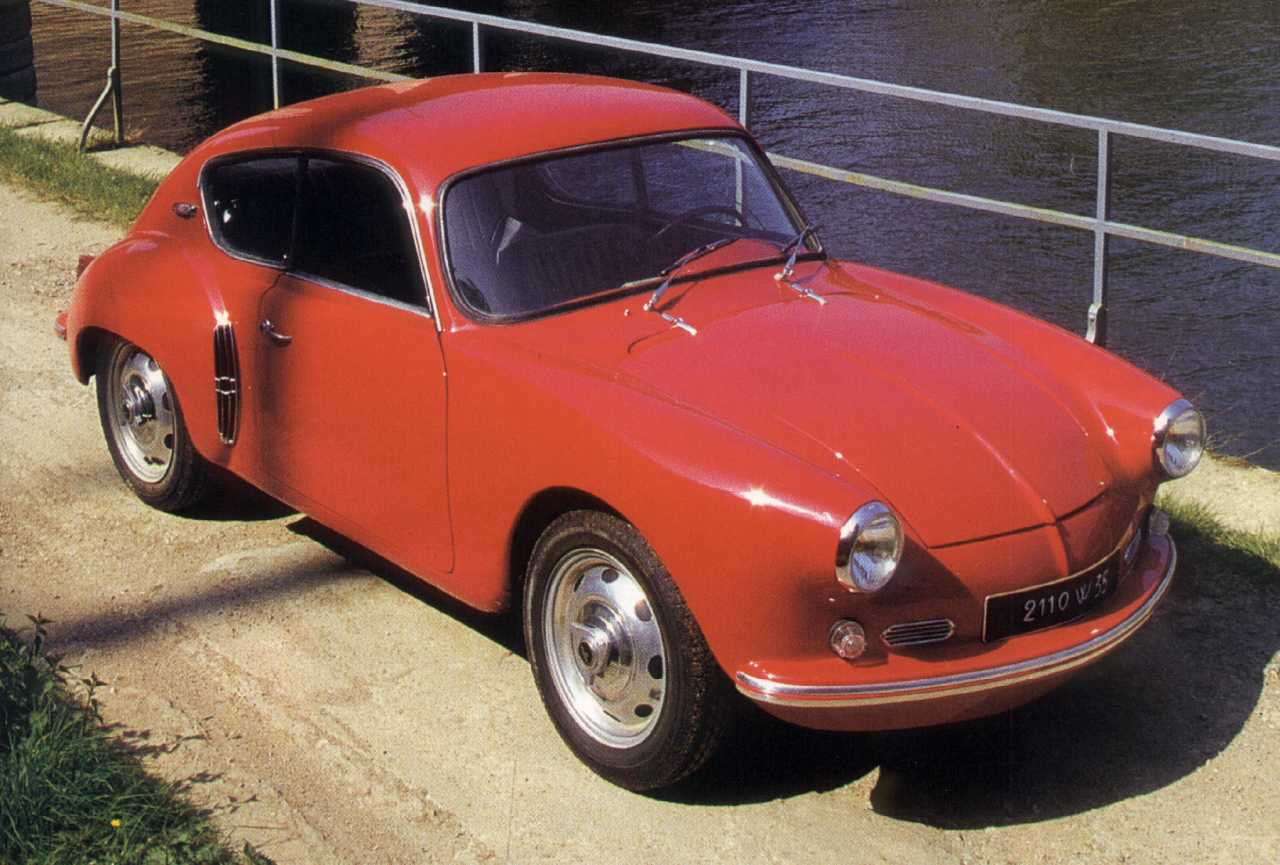
The A106, Alpine's first car

Using Renault 4CVs, Jean Rédélé gained class wins in a number of major events, including the Mille Miglia and Coupe des Alpes. As his experience with the 4CV grew, he incorporated many modifications, including special five-speed gearboxes replacing the original three-speed unit. To provide a lighter car, he built a number of special versions with lightweight aluminium bodies, driving them at Le Mans and Sebring with some success in the early 1950s.

Encouraged by the development of these cars and subsequent customer demand, he created the Alpine brand in 1954. It was named "Alpine" after his Coupe des Alpes successes. He did not realise that in England the previous year, Sunbeam had introduced a sports coupe derived from the Sunbeam Talbot, named the "Sunbeam Alpine". This naming issue caused problems for Alpine throughout its history.

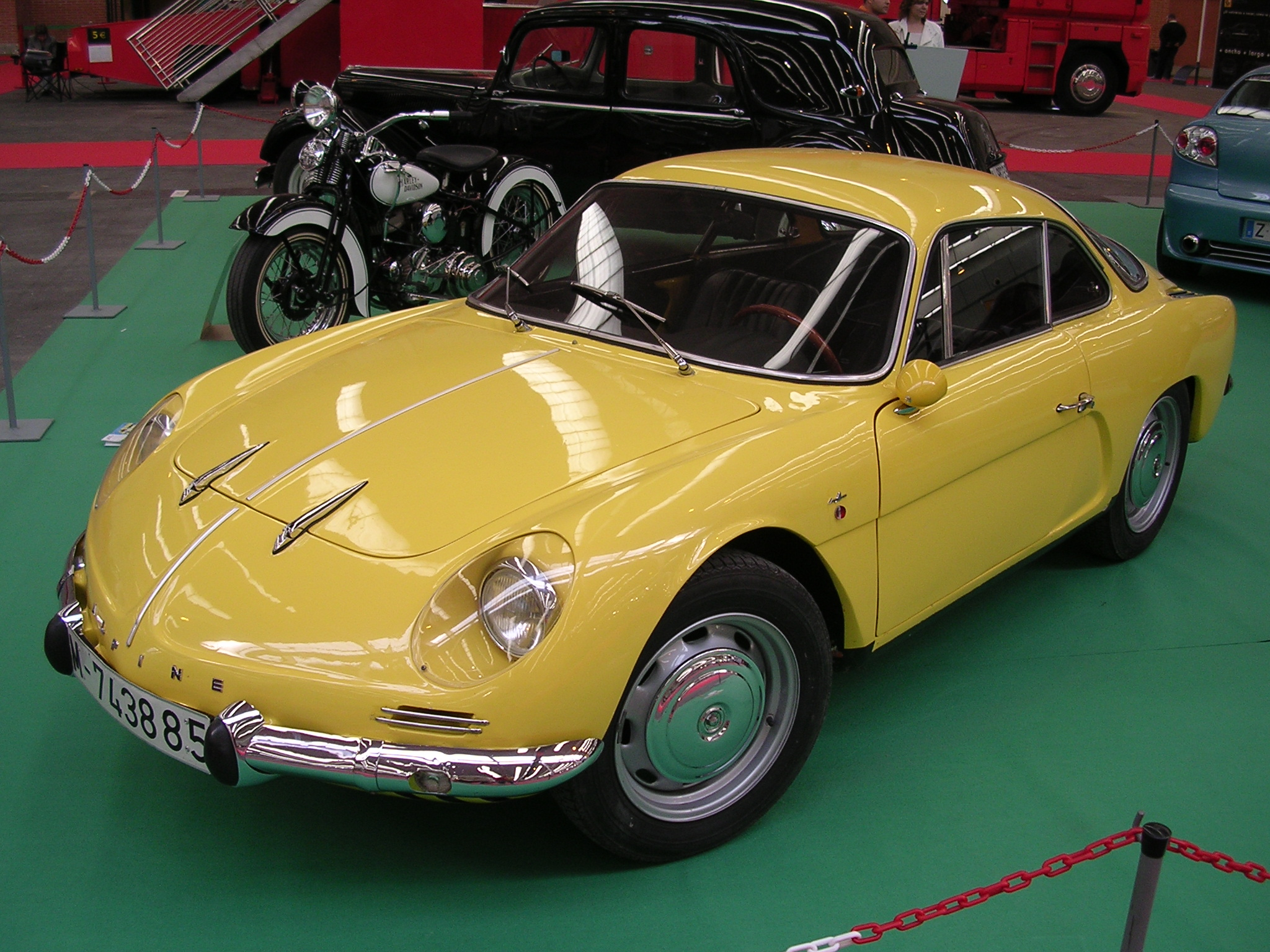
Alpine A108 Berlinette (1958–1965)

In 1955, Rédélé worked with the carrosserie Chappe et Gessalin. They were amongst the pioneers of auto glassfibre construction and produced a small coupe, based on 4CV mechanicals, called the Alpine A106. The A106 achieved a number of successes through the 1950s and was joined by a low and stylish cabriolet. Styling for the car was contracted to the Italian designer Giovanni Michelotti. Under the glassfibre body was a very stiff chassis based on a central tubular backbone which was to be the hallmark of all Alpines.

Alpine then took the Michelotti cabriolet design and developed a 2+2 closed coupe (or 'berlinette') body for it: this became the Alpine A108, now featuring the Dauphine Gordini 845 cc engine, which on later models was bored out to give a capacity of 904 cc or (subsequently) 998 cc. The A108 was built between 1958 and 1963.

=== 1960s ===
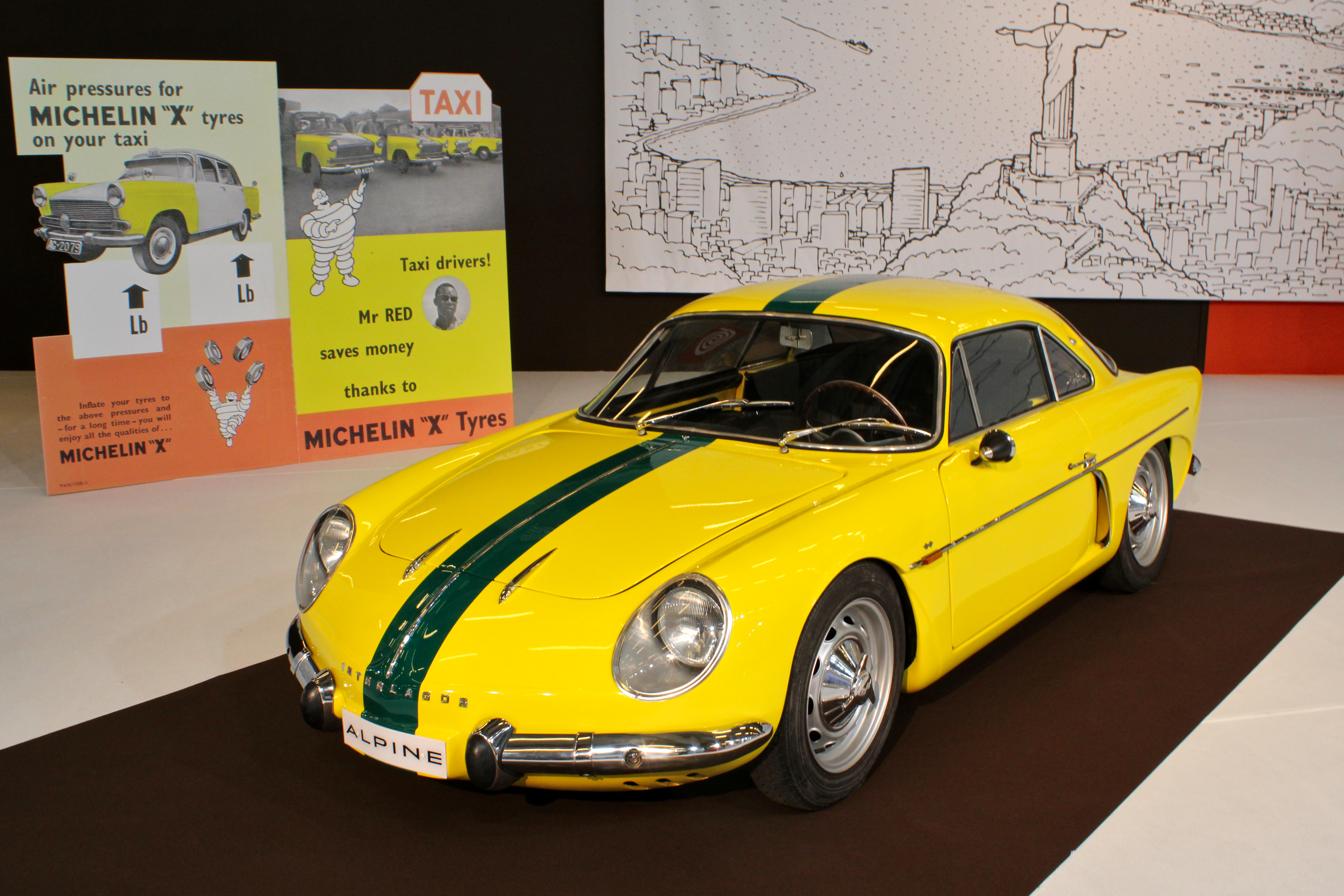
Willys Interlagos Berlineta, the Brazilian A108

In 1962, the A108 began to be produced also in Brazil, by Willys-Overland, being renamed the Willys Interlagos (berlineta, coupé and convertible).

By now the car's mechanicals were beginning to show their age in Europe. Alpine was already working closely with Renault and when the Renault R8 saloon was introduced in 1962, Alpine redeveloped their chassis and made a number of minor body changes to allow the use of R8 mechanicals.

This new car was the A110 Berlinette Tour de France, named after a successful run with the Alpine A108 in the 1962 event. Starting with a 956 cc engine of 51 bhp (38 kW), the same chassis and body developed with relatively minor changes over the years to the stage where, by 1974, the little cars were handling 1800 cc engines developing 180 bhp (134 kW)+. With a competition weight for the car of around 620 kg (1,367 lb), the performance was excellent.

Alpine achieved increasing success in rallying, and by 1968 had been allocated the whole Renault competition budget. This close collaboration with Renault allowed Alpines to be sold and maintained in France by normal Renault dealerships. Real top level success started in 1968 with outright wins in the Coupe des Alpes and other international events. By this time the competition cars were fitted with 1440 cc engines derived from the Renault R8 Gordini. Competition successes became numerous, helped by the fact that Alpine was the first company fully to exploit the competitions homologation rules.

=== 1970s ===
In 1971, Alpines finished first, second and fourth in the Monte Carlo rally, using cars with engines derived from the Renault 16. In 1973, the newer A110 1800 finished first, second, third, and fifth and went on to win the World Rally Championship outright, beating Porsche, Lancia and Ford. During this time, production of the Alpine A110 increased and manufacturing deals were struck for A110s and A108s with factories in a number of other countries including Spain, Mexico, Brazil and Bulgaria.

With 1973 came the international petrol crisis, which had profound effects on many specialist car manufacturers worldwide. From a total Alpine production of 1421 in 1972, the numbers of cars sold dropped to 957 in 1974 and the company was bailed out via a takeover by Renault. Alpine's problems had been compounded by the need for them to develop a replacement for the A110, and launch the car alongside drastically increasing European petrol prices.

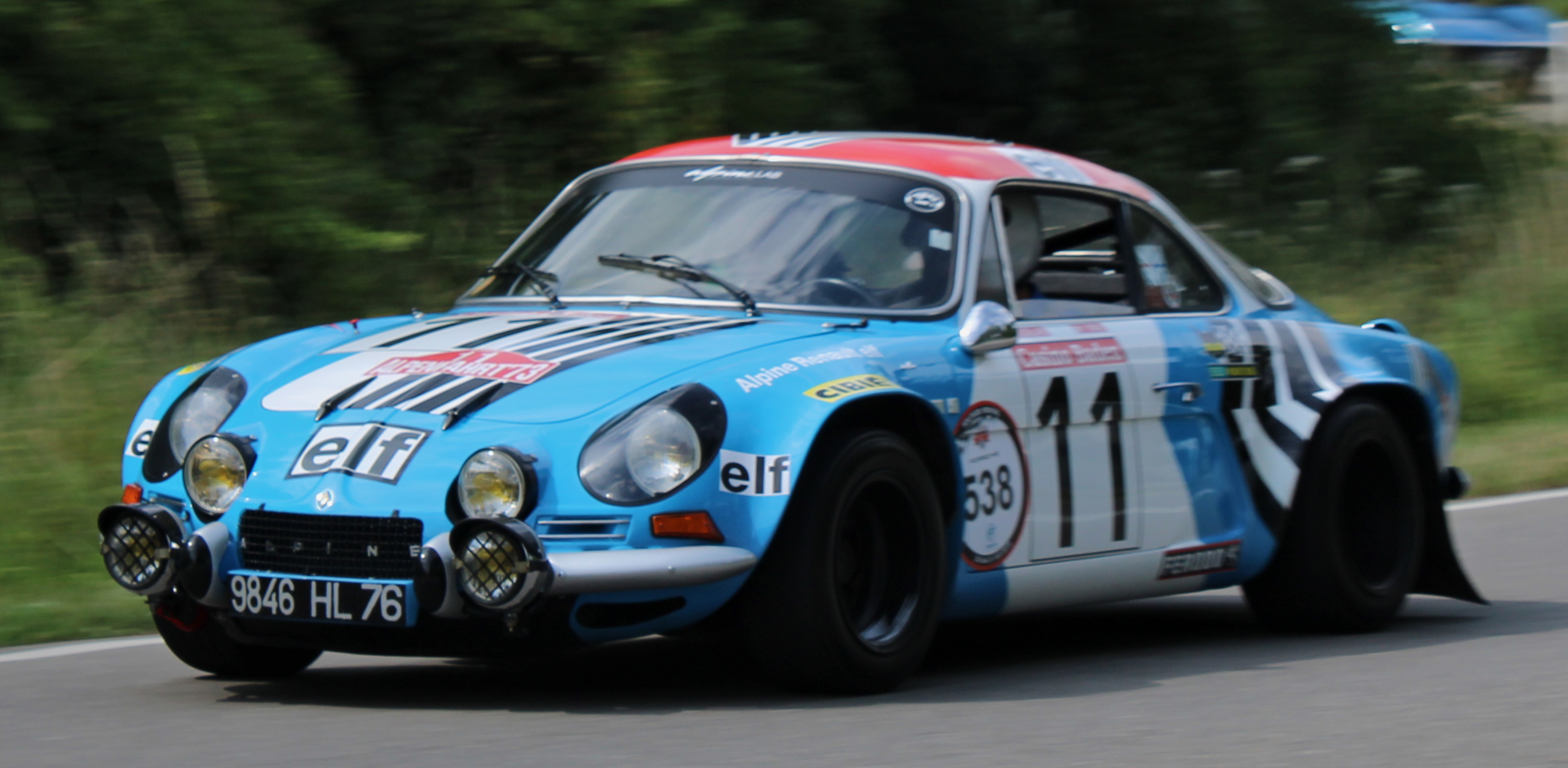
Alpine A110 Berlinette Group 4 (1971–1974).

Through the 1970s, Alpine continued to campaign the A110, and later the Alpine A310 replacement car. However, to compete with Alpine's success, other manufacturers developed increasingly special cars, notably the Lancia Stratos which was based closely on the A110's size and rear-engined concept, though incorporating a Ferrari engine. Alpine's own cars, still based on the 1962 design and using a surprising number of production parts, became increasingly uncompetitive. In 1974 Alpine built a series of factory racing Renault 17 Gordinis (one driven by Jean-Luc Thérier) that won the Press on Regardless World Rally Championship round in Michigan, US.

Having achieved the rally championship, and with Renault money now fully behind them, Alpine had set their sights on a new target. The next aim was to win at Le Mans. Renault had also taken over the Gordini tuning firm and merged the two to form Renault Sport. A number of increasingly successful sports racing cars appeared, culminating in the 1978 Le Mans win with the Renault Alpine A442B. This was fitted with a turbo-charged engine; Alpine had been the first company to run in and win an international rally with a turbo car as far back as 1972, when Thérier took a specially modified A110 to victory on the Critérium des Cévennes.

1971 also saw Alpine begin construction of open-wheel racing cars. Initially in Formula Three, they were building Formula Two cars within a year as well. However, without a competitive Renault Formula Two engine available, the F2 cars could neither be known as Renaults nor Alpines while powered by Ford-Cosworth and BMW engines and were labelled Elf 2 and later Elf 2J. A Renault 2.0 litre engine arrived in time for Jean-Pierre Jabouille to win the European Formula 2 Championship in 1976. By this time, Alpine with Jabouille driving had built a Formula One car as a testing mule which lead directly to their entry into the Formula One World Championship in 1977. A second European Formula 2 championship followed with René Arnoux in 1977 with the customer Martini team, before Alpine sold the F2 operation to Willi Kauhsen to concentrate on the Le Mans and Formula One programs.

=== 1980s ===
Alpine Renault continued to develop their range of models all through the 1980s. The A310 was the next modern interpretation of the A110. The Alpine A310 was a sports car with a rear-mounted engine and was initially powered by a four-cylinder 1.6 L sourced Renault 17 TS/Gordini engine. In 1976 the A310 was restyled by Robert Opron and fitted with the more powerful and newly developed V6 PRV engine. The 2.6 L motor was modified by Alpine with a four-speed manual gearbox. Later they would use a Five-speed manual gearbox and with the group 4 model get a higher tune with more cubic capacity and 3 twin barrel Weber carburetors.

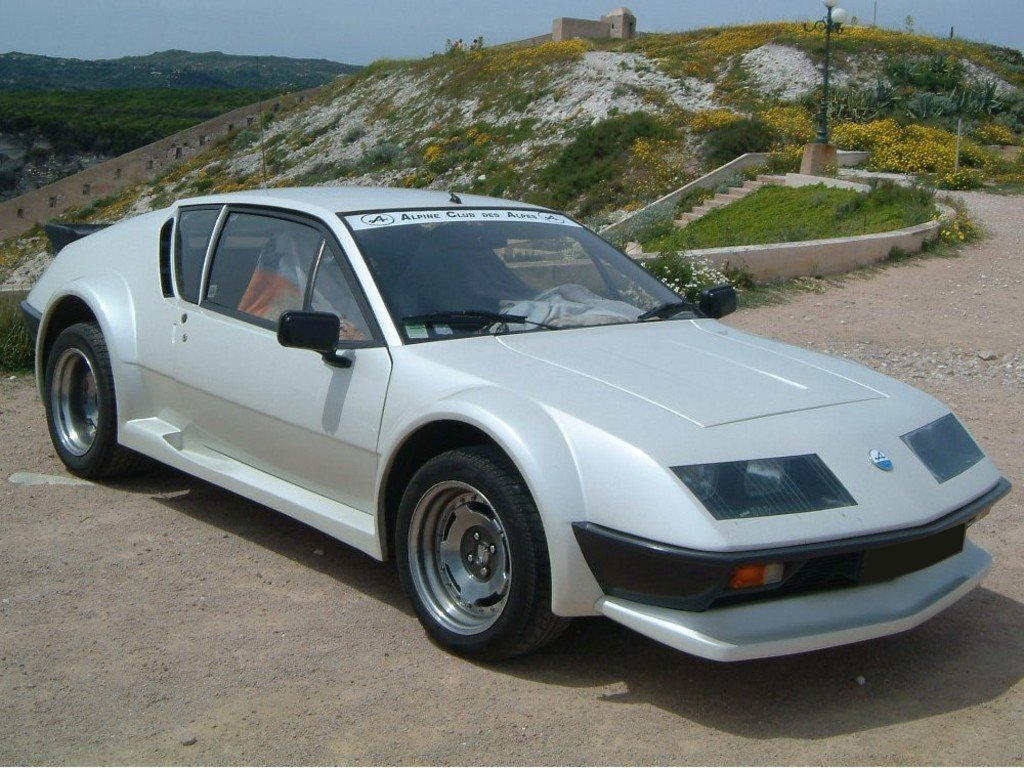
Alpine A310 V6 GT Pack (1983–1984)

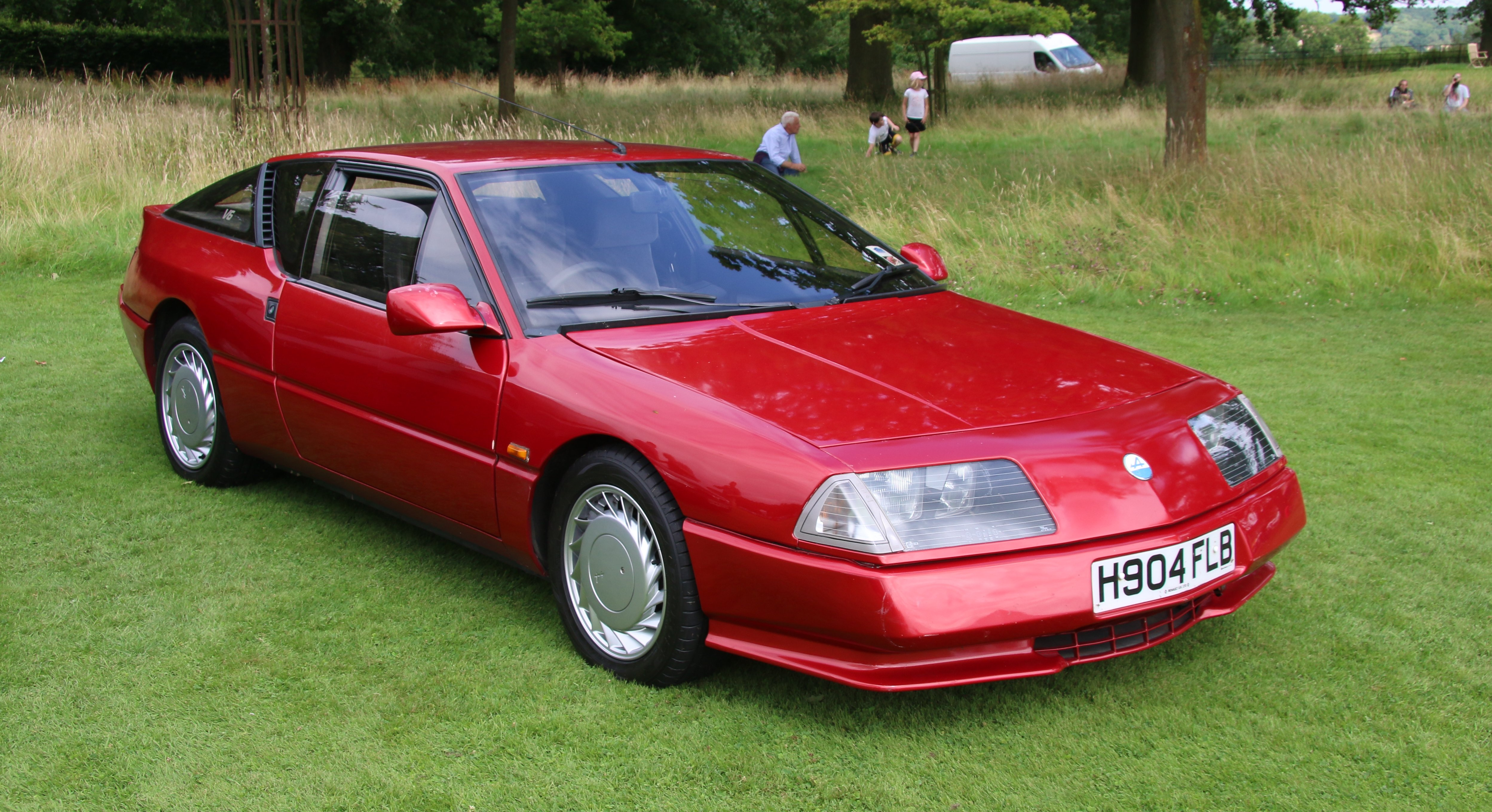
Alpine GTA

After the A310, Alpine transformed into the new Renault Alpine GTA range, produced from plastic and polyester components, commencing with normally aspirated PRV V6 engines. In 1985 the V6 turbo was introduced to complete the range. This car was faster and more powerful than the normally aspirated version. In 1986 polyester parts were cut for the first time by robot using a high pressure (3500 bar) water jet, 0.15 mm (0.01 in) in diameter at three times the speed of sound. In the same year the American specification V6 turbo was developed.

In 1987 the installation of anti-pollution systems allowed the V6 turbo to be distributed to Switzerland, Germany, Austria and the Netherlands. 1989 saw the launch of the limited edition GTA Mille Miles to celebrate Alpine's 35th anniversary. Production was limited to 100 cars, all fitted with ABS braking, polished wheels, special leather interior and paintwork. This version was not available in right hand drive.

=== 1990s ===
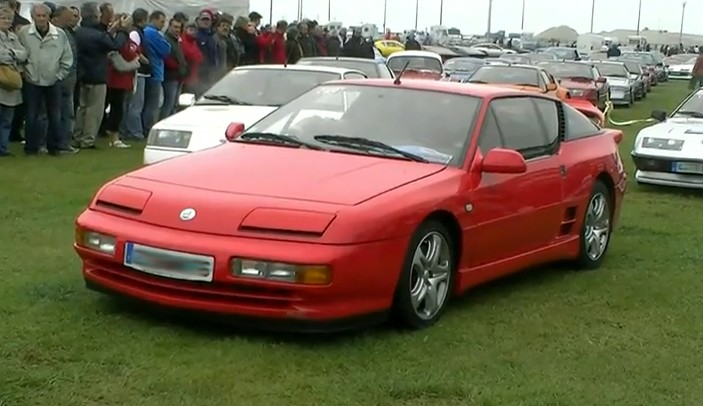
Alpine A610 Turbo

1990 saw the launch of the special edition wide-bodied GTA Le Mans. Otherwise mechanically identical to the V6 Turbo, the engine was fitted with a catalytic converter and power was reduced to 185 bhp (138 kW). This model was available in the UK and right hand drive versions carried a numbered plaque on the dashboard. The Le Mans is the most collectable and valuable GTA derivative, since only 325 were made (299 LHD and 26 RHD). These were available from Renault dealers in the UK, and the country's motoring press are belatedly recognising the GTA series as the 'great unsung supercar of the 1980s'.

The Alpine A610 was launched in 1991. It was re-styled inside and out but was still recognisable as a GTA derivative. The chassis structure was extensively reworked but the central box principal remained the same. The front was completely re-designed the interior was also greatly improved. Air-conditioning and power steering were fitted as standard. The total production run for A610s derivatives was 818 vehicles 67 right hand drive and 751 left hand drive. After production of the A610 ended, the Alpine factory in Dieppe produced the Renault Sport Spider and a new era was to begin.

The last Alpine, an A610, rolled off the Dieppe line on 7 April 1995, with Renault abandoning the Alpine name. This was always a problem in the UK market. Alpines could not be sold in the UK under their own name because Sunbeam owned the trade mark (because of the mid-50s Sunbeam Alpine Mk I). In the 1970s, for example, Dieppe were building modified Renault 5s for the worldwide market. The rest of the world knew them as R5 Alpines but in the UK they had to be renamed to R5 Gordini. After numerous company takeovers, the multinational Stellantis own the British Alpine trademark as of January 2021.

The Alpine factory in Dieppe continued to expand; in the 1980s they built the special R5 Turbo cars, following the rear engine formula they had always used. They built all Clio Williams and RenaultSport Spiders. The factory put its Alpine badges on the early batches of the mid-engine Clio series one Clio V6. The Clio Series 2 was also assembled there with more recent RenaultSport Clio 172 and RenaultSport Clio 182s.

Between 1989 and 1995, a projected new Alpine named the A710 "Berlinette 2", was designed and two prototypes were built. The A710 used the 2-litre, 150 horsepower engine from the Renault Clio Williams mounted in an aluminium chassis. Renault's marketing department stated that the car would need to be less basic and include more modern features such as electric windows and air conditioning. Subsequently, the project was deemed too costly (600 million francs), and as adding more modern equipment and interior would compromise the price and performances, the project was cancelled. Despite its cancellation, the engine and aluminium chassis from the A710 were later used on the Renault Sport Spider.

Following the creation of the Renault–Nissan–Mitsubishi Alliance in 1999, Renault partnered with Lotus to develop the Z11 Berlinette, an art-deco design study investigating the return of the Alpine brand. The car was scheduled to be revealed at the 2001 Geneva Motor Show alongside the Koleos concept (codenamed Z10) and the Talisman concept (Z12), but the project was ultimately shelved and the Z11 was not shown.

=== 21st century: relaunch of the Alpine marque ===
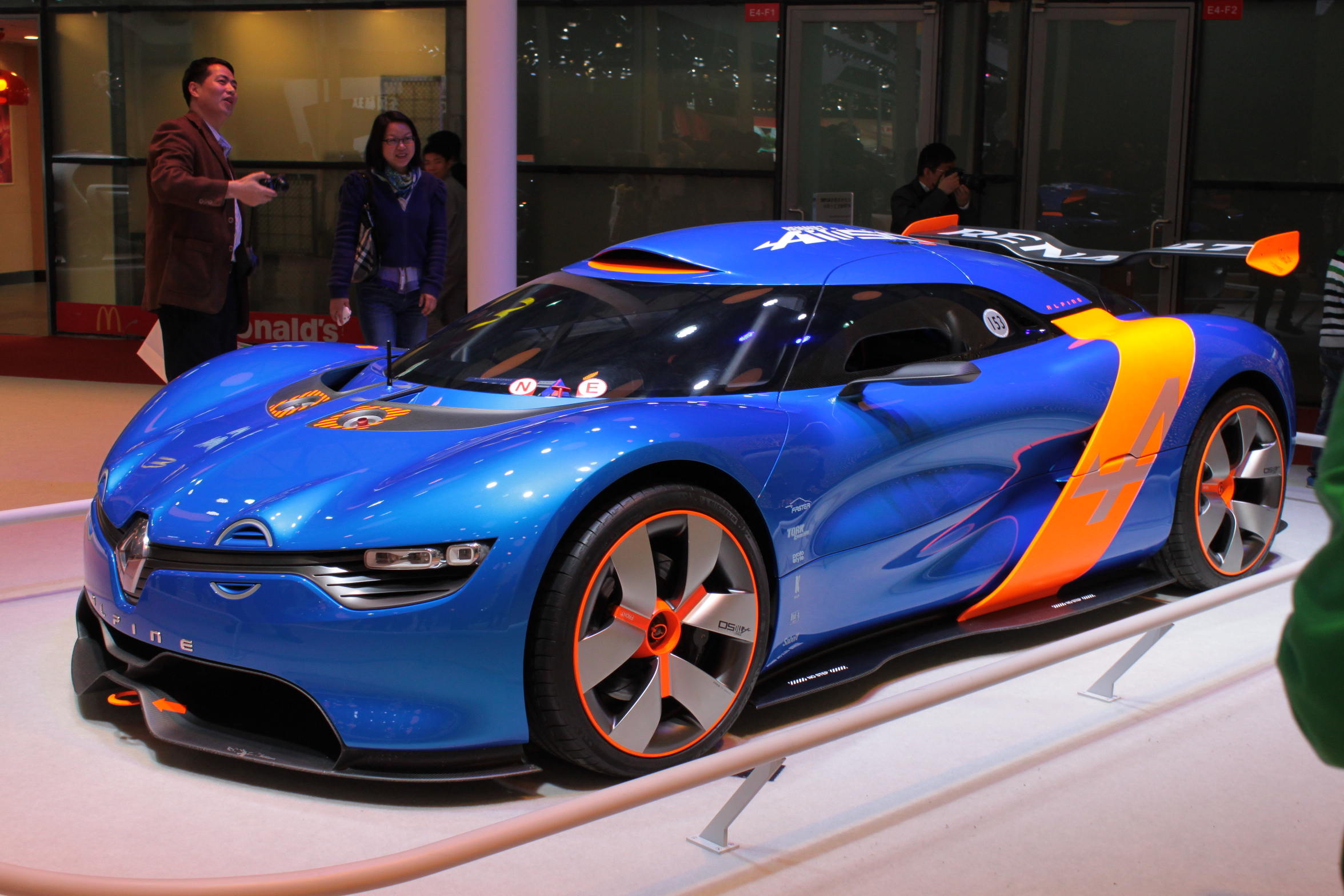
A concept racing car Renault Alpine A110-50 at Auto Shanghai 2013

In 2005, Renault was reportedly developing a new Alpine car, codenamed project W16. The concept was a small, mid engine 2+2 SUV based around the design of the Renault Wind concept car. The project never came to fruition.

In October 2007, Renault's marketing boss Patrick Blain revealed there were plans for several sports cars in Renault's future line up, but stressed that the first model would not arrive until after 2010. Blain confirmed that Renault was unlikely to use a new name for its future sports car and would probably use the Alpine name to brand it. Blain described it as being a "radical sports car" and not just a sports version of a regular model. The new Alpine sports car was to have a version of the Premium Midship platform from the Nissan 350Z and would be classed to compete with the Mazda MX-5. In February 2009, Renault confirmed that plans to revive the Alpine brand had been frozen as a direct result of the 2008 financial crisis and the Great Recession.

It was later revealed that Renault had been working on a prototype around 2007, named the Renault W19. The car featured many design cues from the A110 of the 1960s and was based around the drivetrain and chassis of the Nissan 350Z. The project was later cancelled, speculated to be due in part to the arrival of the Nissan GT-R, as well as the 2008 financial crisis. The 2017 Alpine A110 heavily resembles this concept, however, despite featuring a mid engine layout.

In France, there is a large network of Alpine enthusiasts clubs. Clubs exist in many countries including the UK, USA, Australia, and Japan.

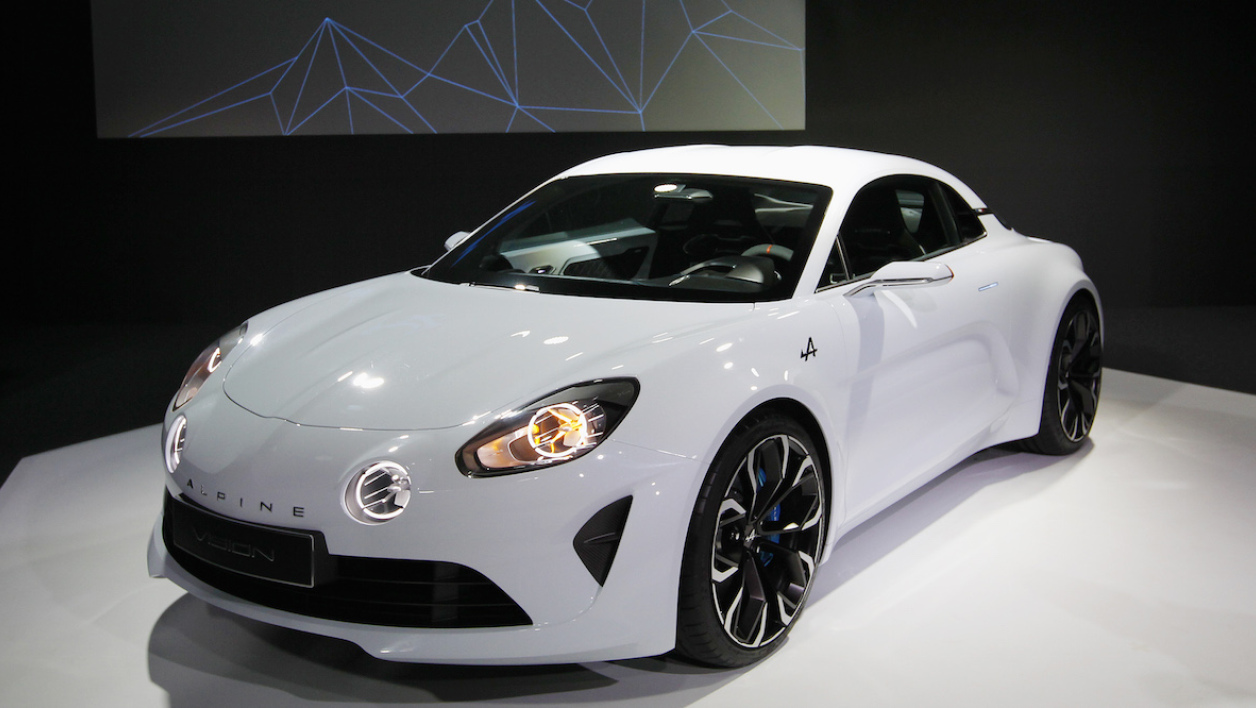
Alpine Vision showcar at the 86th Geneva Motor Show

In March 2012 Renault bought the Alpine name to use in the UK. In May 2012, images of a new Renault Alpine concept titled as Renault Alpine A110-50 were leaked prior to its debut in Monaco. Its styling was based on the Renault DeZir presented in 2010.

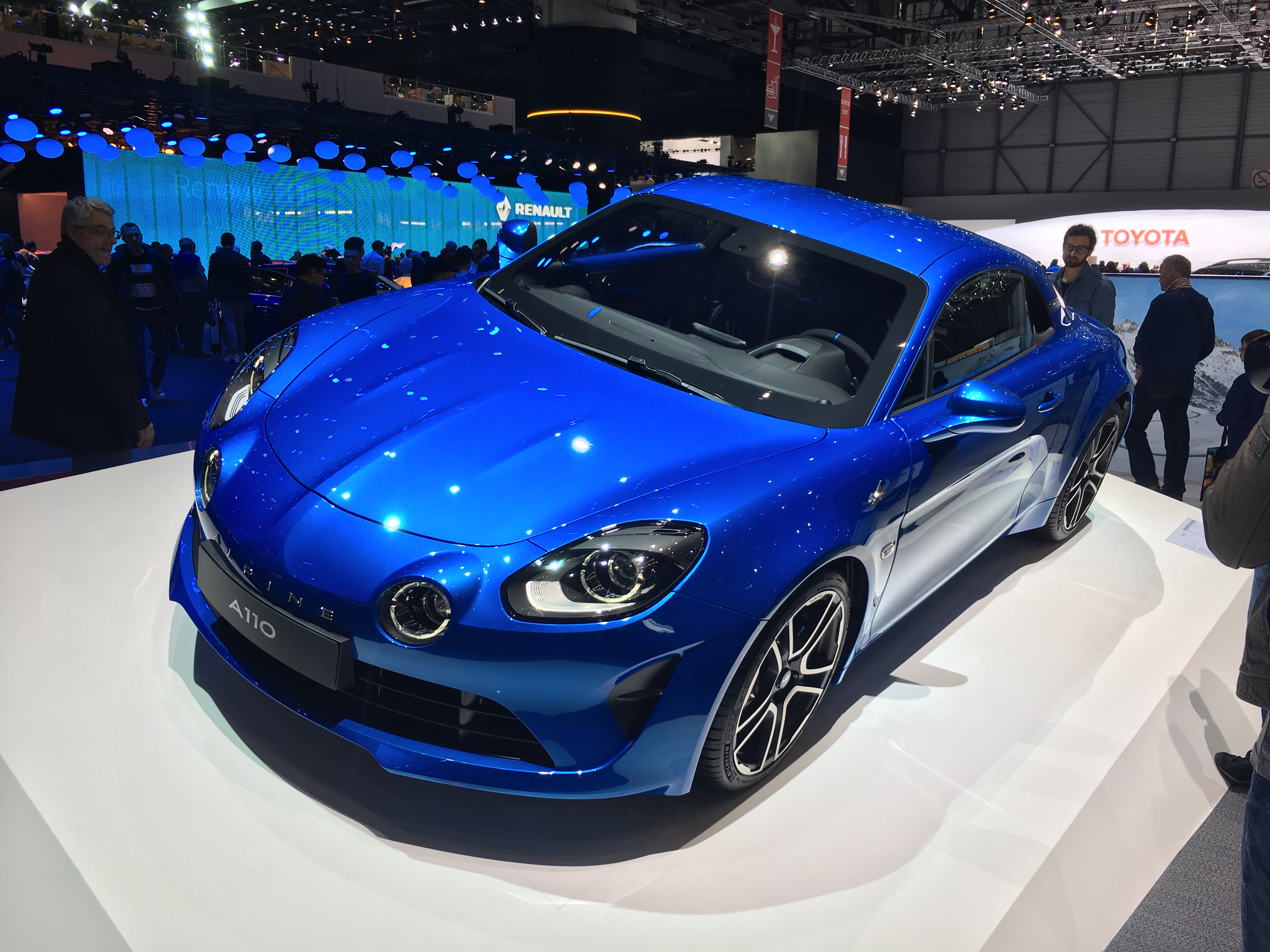
Alpine A110 at the 87th Geneva Motor Show

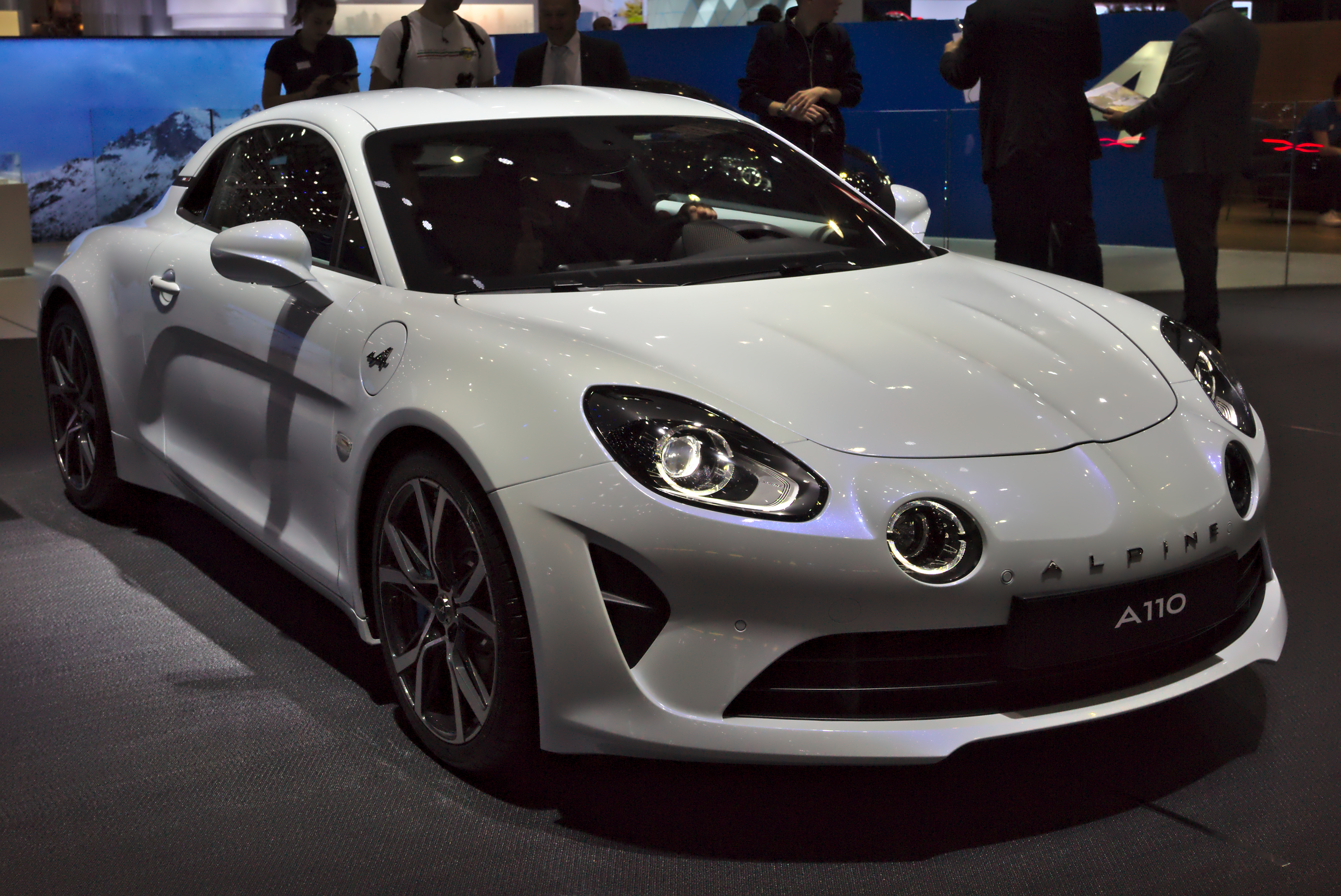
A110 in white

In November 2012, Renault and Caterham Cars announced the purchasing by the latter of a 50% stake in the Renault's wholly owned subsidiary Société des Automobiles Alpine to create a joint venture (Société des Automobiles Alpine Caterham or SAAC) owned equally by both parts, with the aim of developing affordable sport cars under the Alpine (for Renault) and Caterham (for Caterham Cars) brands, which would be available in 2016. In this partnership, Caterham acquired 50% ownership of the Renault's Dieppe assembly plant assets. On 10 June 2014, Renault announced it would be repurchasing the stake from Caterham Cars in SAAC, renaming it Société des Automobiles Alpine. During 2015, two new Alpine concepts were introduced: the Alpine Celebration, unveiled at the Le Mans race weekend, and the CGI-created Alpine Vision Gran Turismo. In February 2016, at an event held in Monte Carlo, Groupe Renault's chief Carlos Ghosn unveiled the Alpine Vision showcar (a model close to the planned production Alpine) and announced a 2017 relaunch for the Alpine brand. The Vision was later presented at the 86th Geneva Motor Show by Alpine. The production version reused the A110 name and the first official pictures were revealed on 28 February 2017 prior to the unveiling at the 87th Geneva Motor show.

On 10 December 2020, Alpine and MV Agusta announced that they would make a special edition of the MV Agusta Superveloce influenced by the Alpine A110 called the Superveloce 800 Alpine, there would be approximately 110 models made.

In January 2021, Alpine said it would absorb the Renault Sport entities (Renault Sport Cars and Renault Sport Racing), merging them with the existing Alpine operations to form a new Alpine business unit. The company also said it had signed a memorandum of understanding with Lotus Cars to co-develop an electric successor for the A110. In May 2021, Les Ulis-based Renault Sport Cars was officially renamed Alpine Cars and turned into the main development hub for Alpine as well as the whole Renault group sports cars.

In mid-2023, Alpine announced its plans for global expansion, including entering the U.S. market by 2027. The brand will introduce a mid-size electric crossover and a large electric SUV as the first vehicles in its North American lineup. Discussions have been initiated with AutoNation to establish a dealership network in the country, with these new electric vehicles being developed specifically to meet the preferences of American consumers.

== Operations ==
=== Dieppe plant ===
The first assembly plant for Alpine was at a small workshop owned by Rédélé on the Pasteur avenue in Dieppe. In 1969, to cope with increasing demand, the assembly was moved to a larger facility on de Bréauté avenue, its present location.

The Dieppe plant has 3.8 hectares of covered buildings. As of 2019, it had 386 employees.

The plant is semi-automatised, with high worker input (before the launch of the 2017 A110, vehicles were almost completely hand-built) and focuses on low-volume, high quality assembly. It can produce an average of 15 A110s per day. The plant presses neither steel nor aluminium (the A110s are mostly built on prefabricated alloy panels). The plant has no welding section, as the A110 chassis and bodywork are riveted and glued on a special assembly line and moved to a low-temperature coating plant (able to paint both the alloy and plastic elements) and then to a sanding robot (to remove imperfections) and wiping robot (to clean the vehicle). Final assembly is made on a single line, with logistics teams preparing the vehicle's components beforehand to travel along the line with it. Cockpits are assembled and put on by the side and pre-assembled powertrains are put on the rear. Apart from low-volume cars, the Dieppe plant also assembles racing cars (such as the Clio Rally4, a rallying car based on the fifth-generation Renault Clio), co-develops racing cars, produces and sells parts for racing cars, and tunes engines.

From the late 1970s, Alpine's Dieppe plant produced Renault Sport models and, after the discontinuation of the Alpine brand in 1995, this became its main focus. Renault Sport models produced over time by Alpine include: Renault 5 Turbo, Renault Sport Spider, Clio Renault Sport, Mégane Renault Sport. The last Renault Sport model produced by Dieppe aimed at the mainstream market was the fourth-generation Clio Renault Sport, which was put out of production at the site in 2018. Between 2015 and 2016, the plant also assembled the Bolloré Bluecar.

=== Alpine Racing ===
Alpine Racing is the Alpine's motorsport division. It is made up of the Alpine subsidiaries Alpine Racing Limited (an Enstone-based operation) and Alpine Racing SAS (Viry-Châtillon) mainly for running the company Formula One programme and a partnership with Signatech for other programmes.

The Alpine competition department had various racing programmes from the early 1960s onwards. At the end of 1976, the department was merged with Gordini to form Renault Sport. Some Alpine racing activities continued after that, including a 1978 Le Mans 24 Hours overall victory with the Renault Alpine A442, partnering its parent Renault.

In 2013, as part of the promotional activities for the launching of Alpine roadcars, Alpine partnered with Signatech to enter a Nissan-powered, Oreca-built prototype into the European Le Mans Series championship's LMP2 class, re-establishing Alpine-badged racing activities, and won the 2013 and 2014 championships. In 2015, the Signatech-Alpine combination entered into the World Endurance Championship (WEC)'s LMP2 class, achieving the 2016 and 2018-2019 championships and winning three Le Mans 24 races. Through its partnership with Signatech, Alpine also launched GT4's touring car and rallying programmes for its A110.

In September 2020, Groupe Renault announced it would rename its existing Formula One team as Alpine F1 Team, while Renault would remain as the engine marque. In January 2021, the Alpine company said it would absorb all existing Renault Sport racing activities besides Formula One.

In March 2021, Alpine presented the Alpine Endurance Team, a WEC's top class team managed by Signatech and using a "grandfathered" Rebellion R13. In October 2021, Alpine said it would enter two WEC prototypes built on the LMDh rules from 2024 onwards, with the running side managed again by Signatech. Oreca was announced as the chassis main developer and builder (assisted by Alpine Racing's Enstone operation) and the engine development side would be carried out by Alpine Racing's Viry-Châtillon base.

== Leadership ==
- Jean Rédélé (1955–1978)
- Laurent Rossi (2021–2023)
- Philippe Krief (2023–Present)

== Alpine models ==
=== Street models ===
==== Current ====
Alpine A110	2-seat coupe	(2017–2026)
Alpine A290	5-door hatchback	(2024–present)
Alpine A390	compact crossover	(2026–present)

==== Former ====
- A106 (1955–1961)
- A108 (1958–1965)
- A110 (1962–1977)
- GT4 (1963–1969)
- A310 (1971–1984)
- GTA (1984–1991)
- A610 (1991–1995)
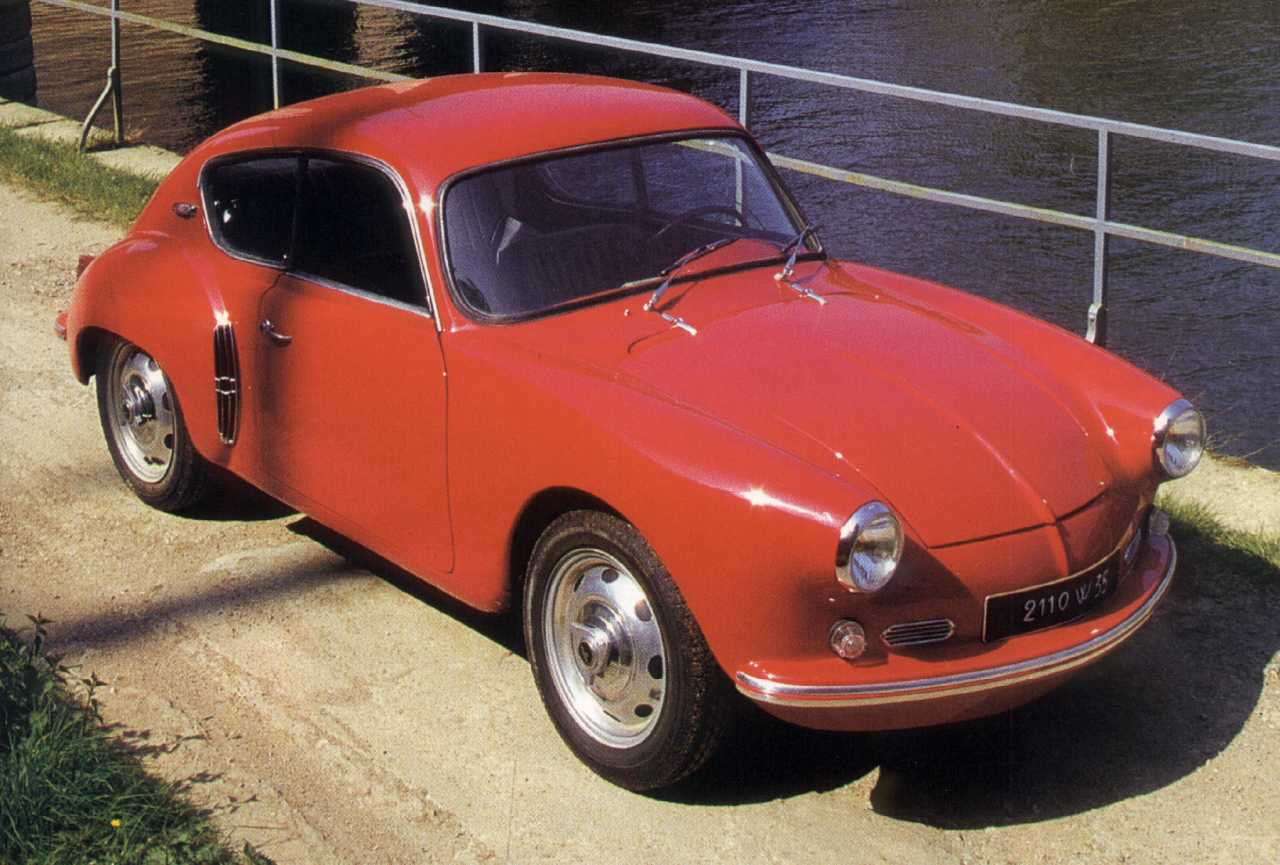
Alpine A106

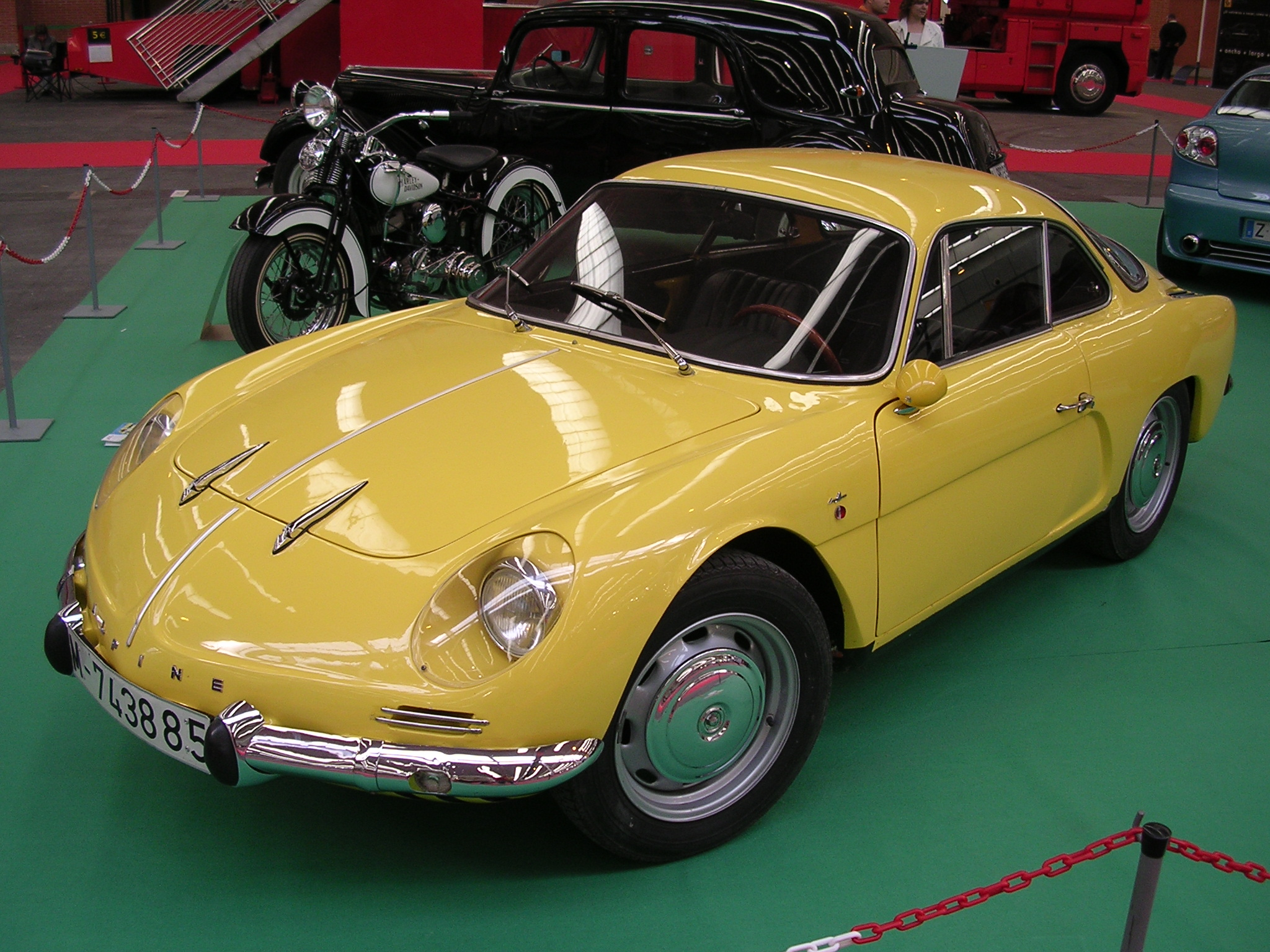
Alpine A108

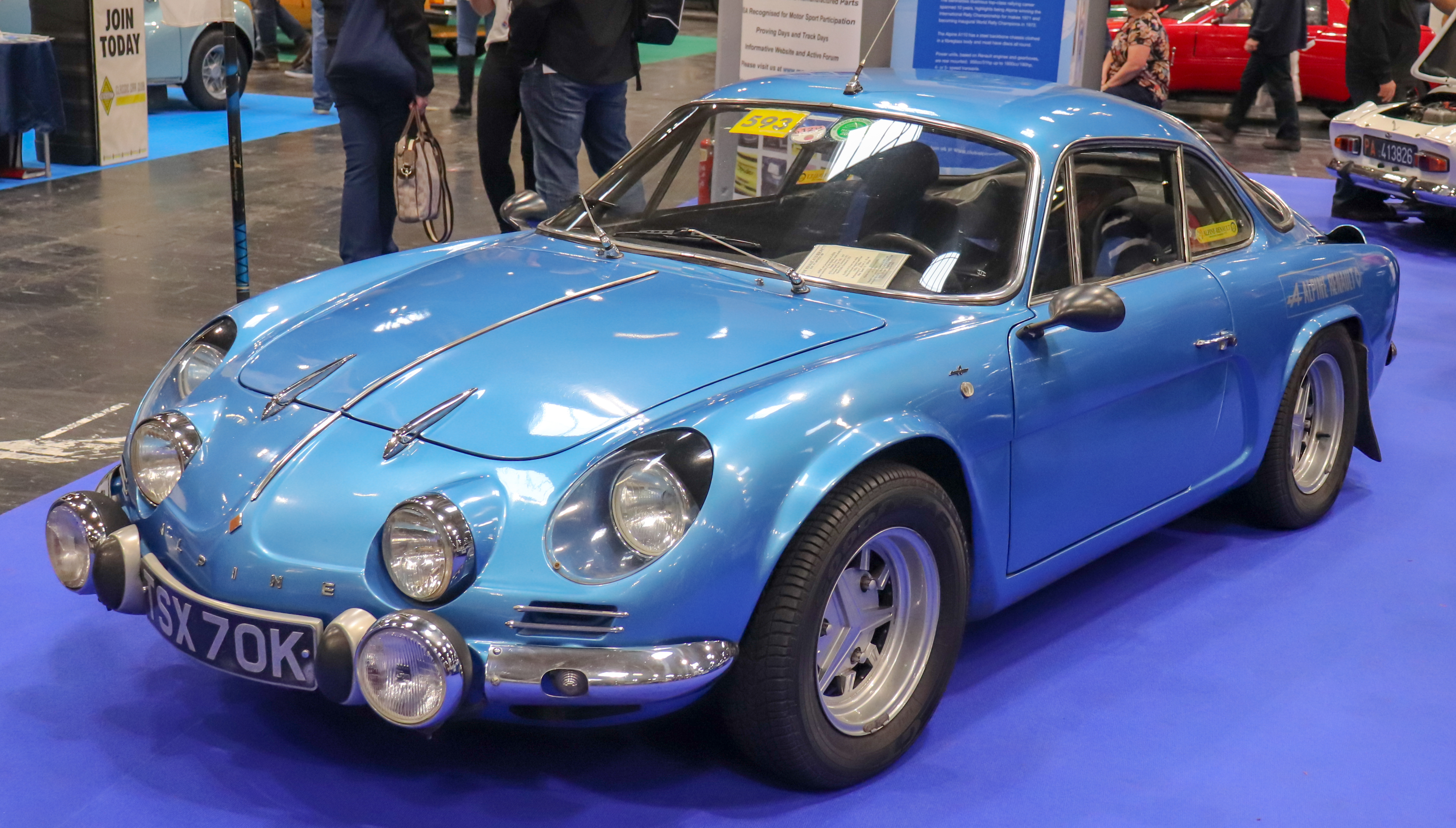
Alpine A110

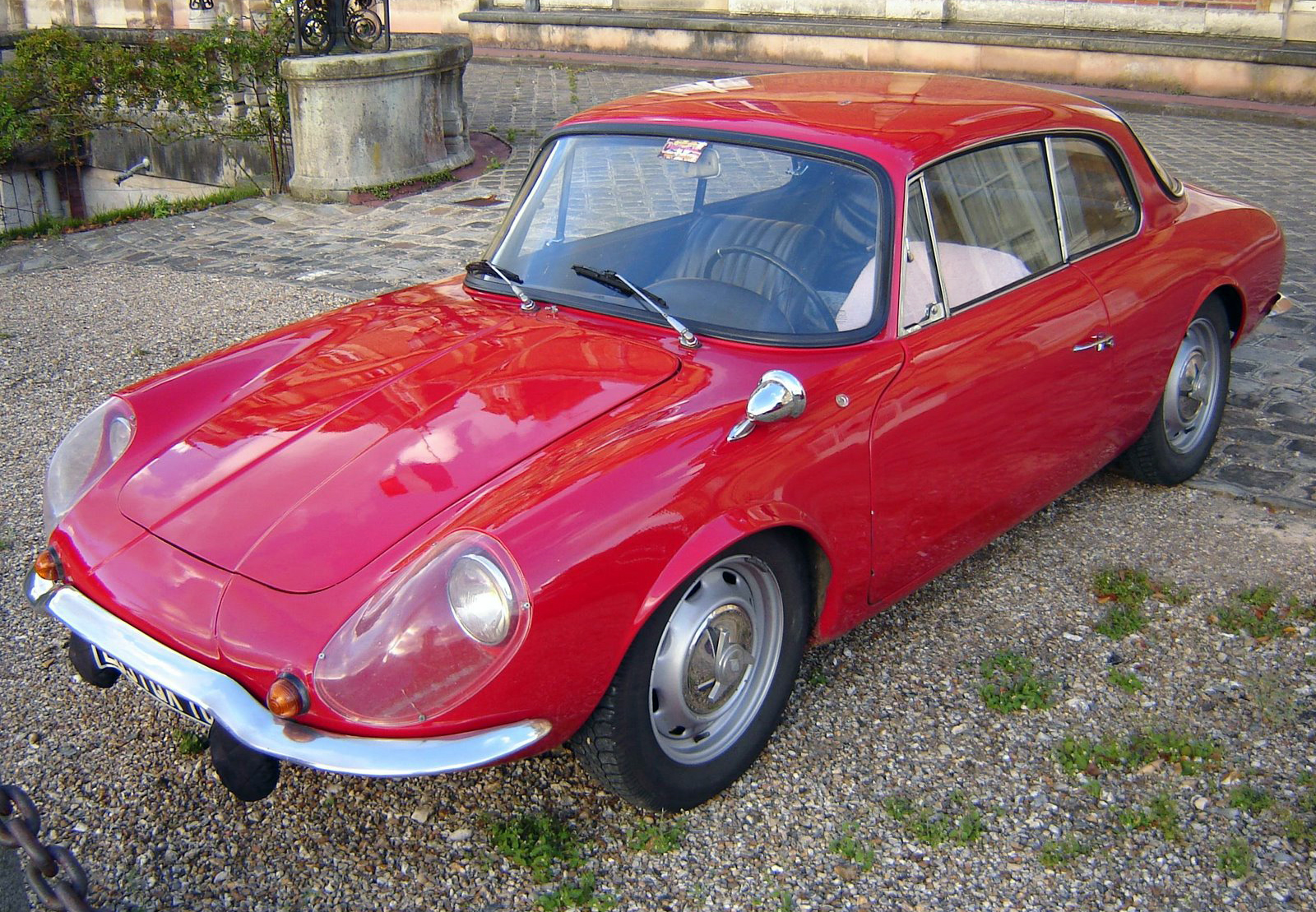
Alpine GT4

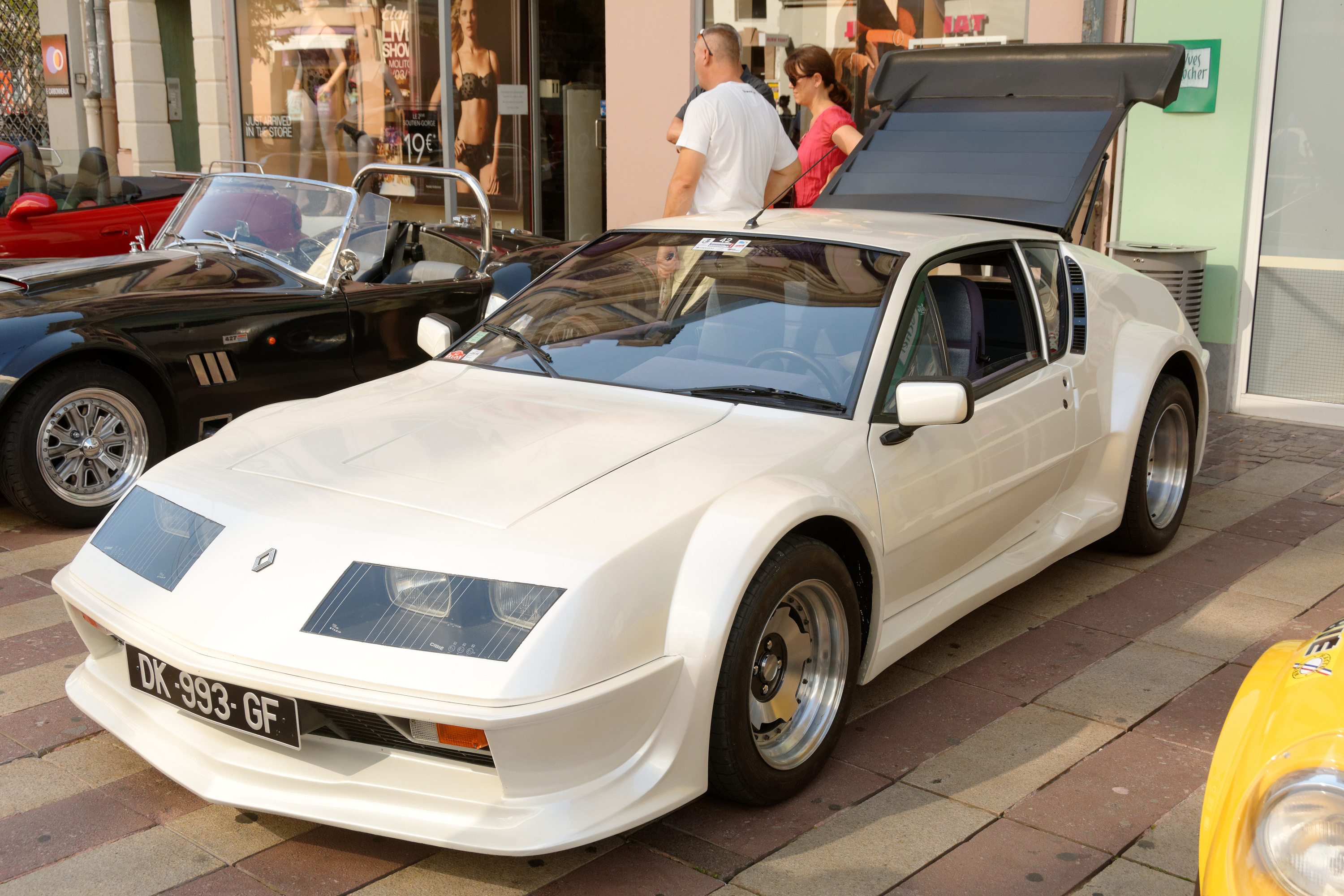
Alpine A310

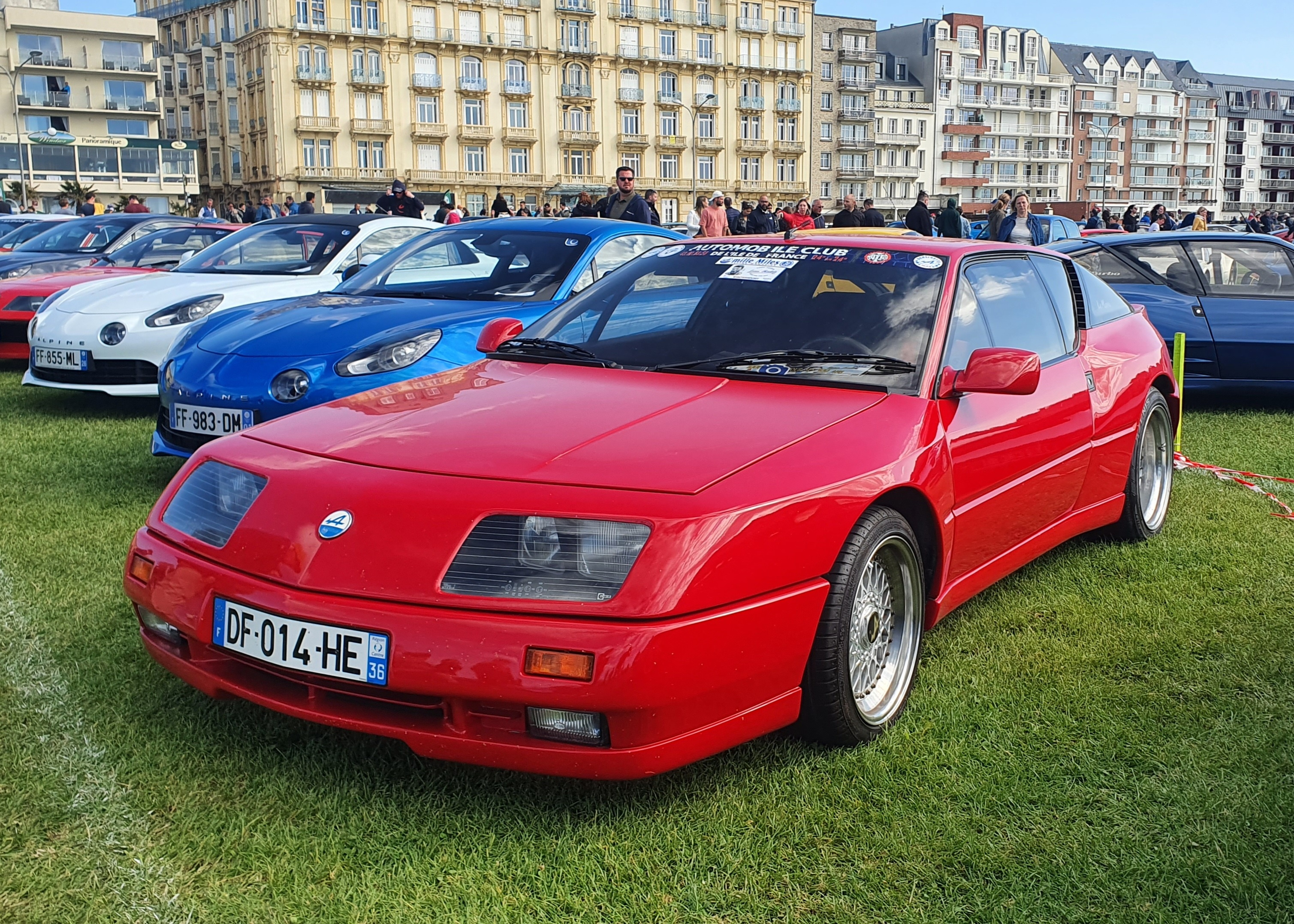
Alpine GTA

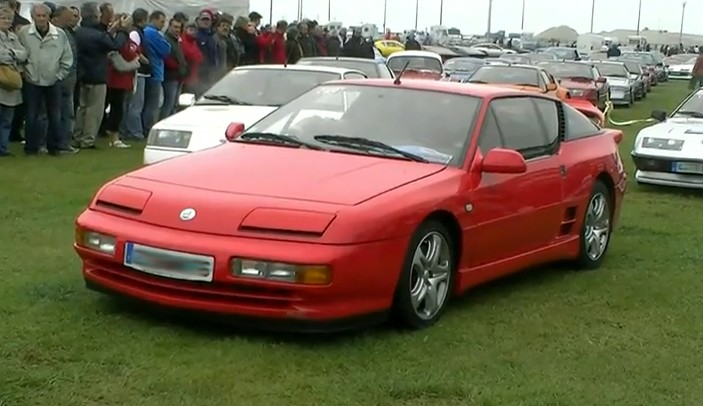
Alpine A610

=== Concept car ===
- Renault Alpine A110-50 (2012)
- Alpine Vision Gran Turismo (2015)
- Alpine Vision (2016)
- Alpine Alpenglow (2022)
- Alpine A290_β (2023)
- Alpine A390_β (2024)
- Alpine A310 Vision (2024)
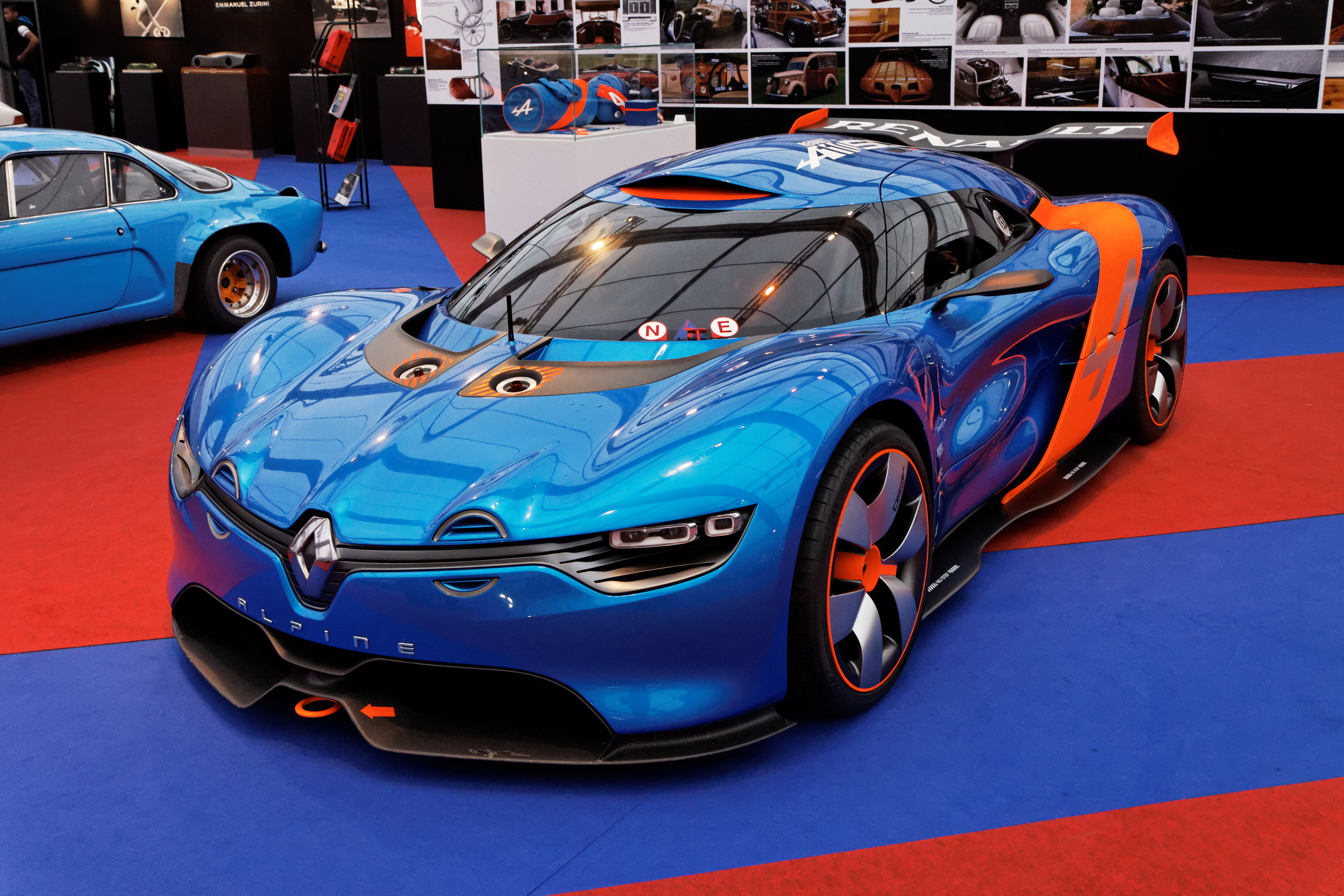
Renault Alpine A110-50

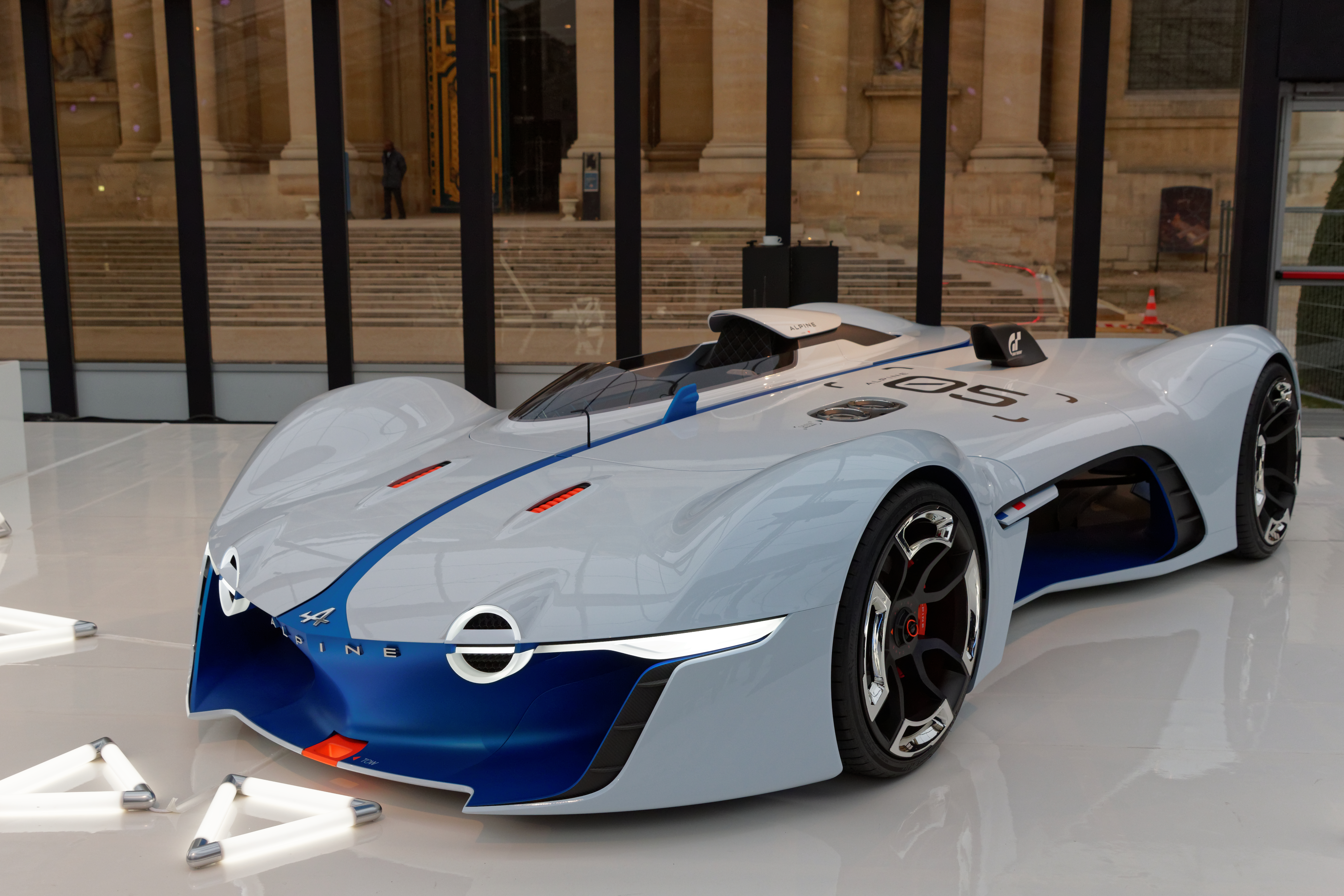
Alpine Vision Gran Turismo

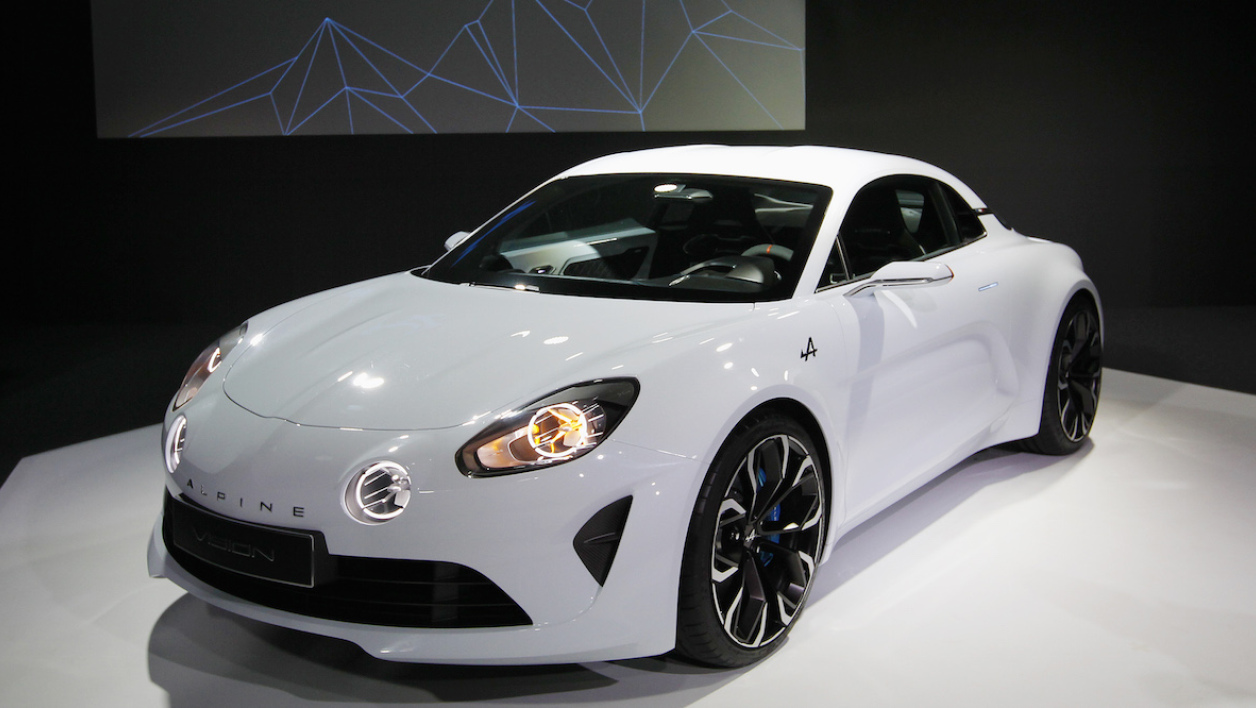
Alpine Vision

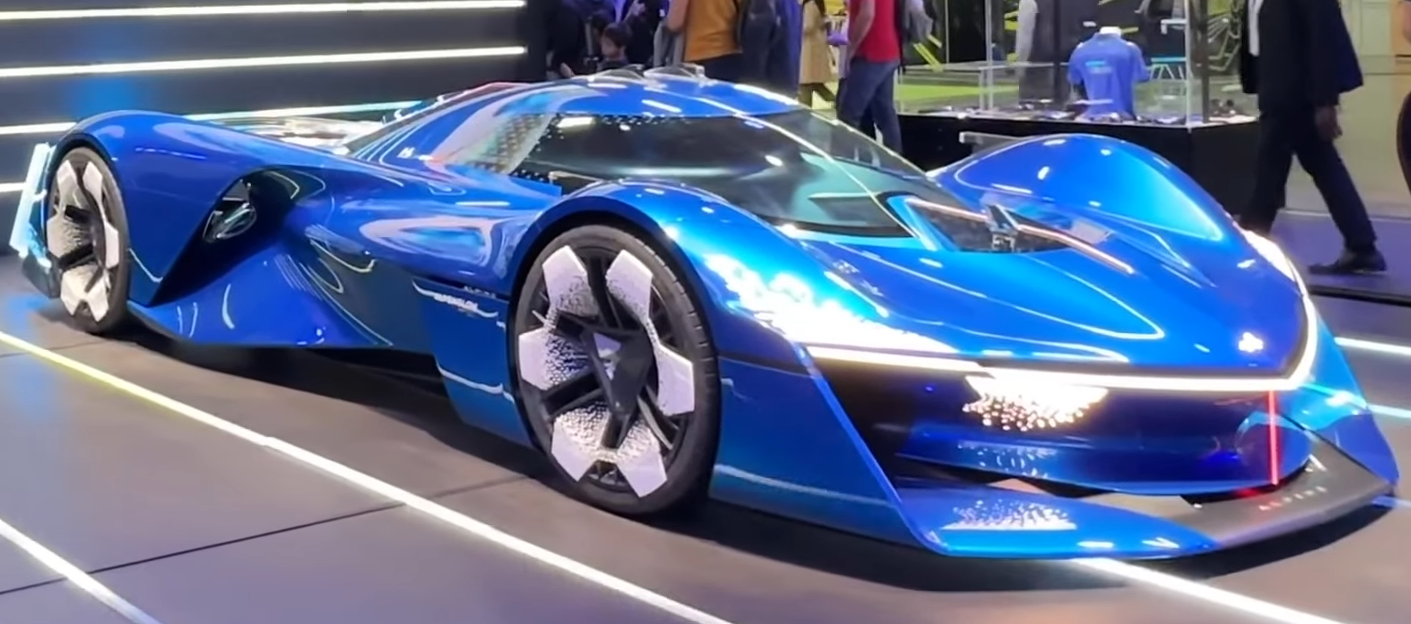
Alpine Alpenglow

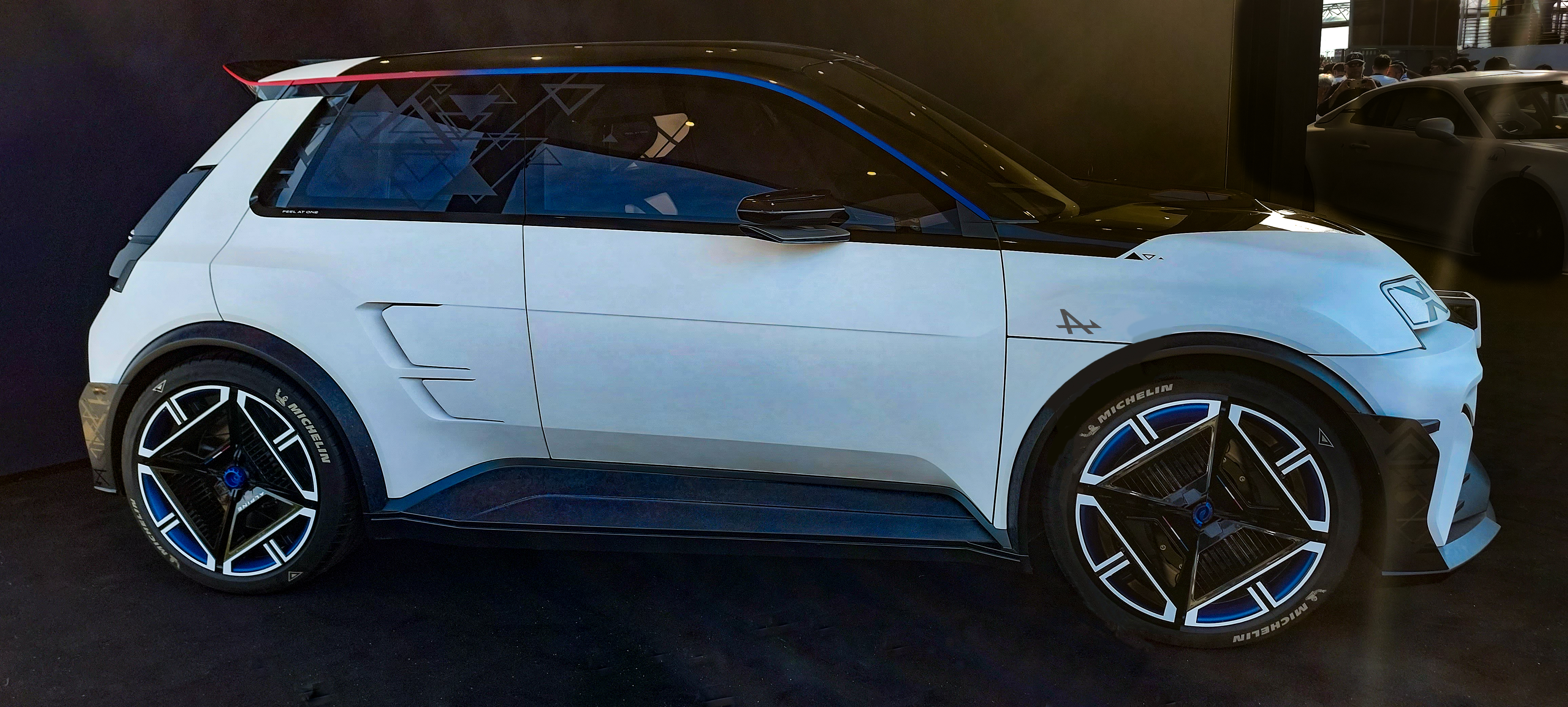
Alpine A290_β

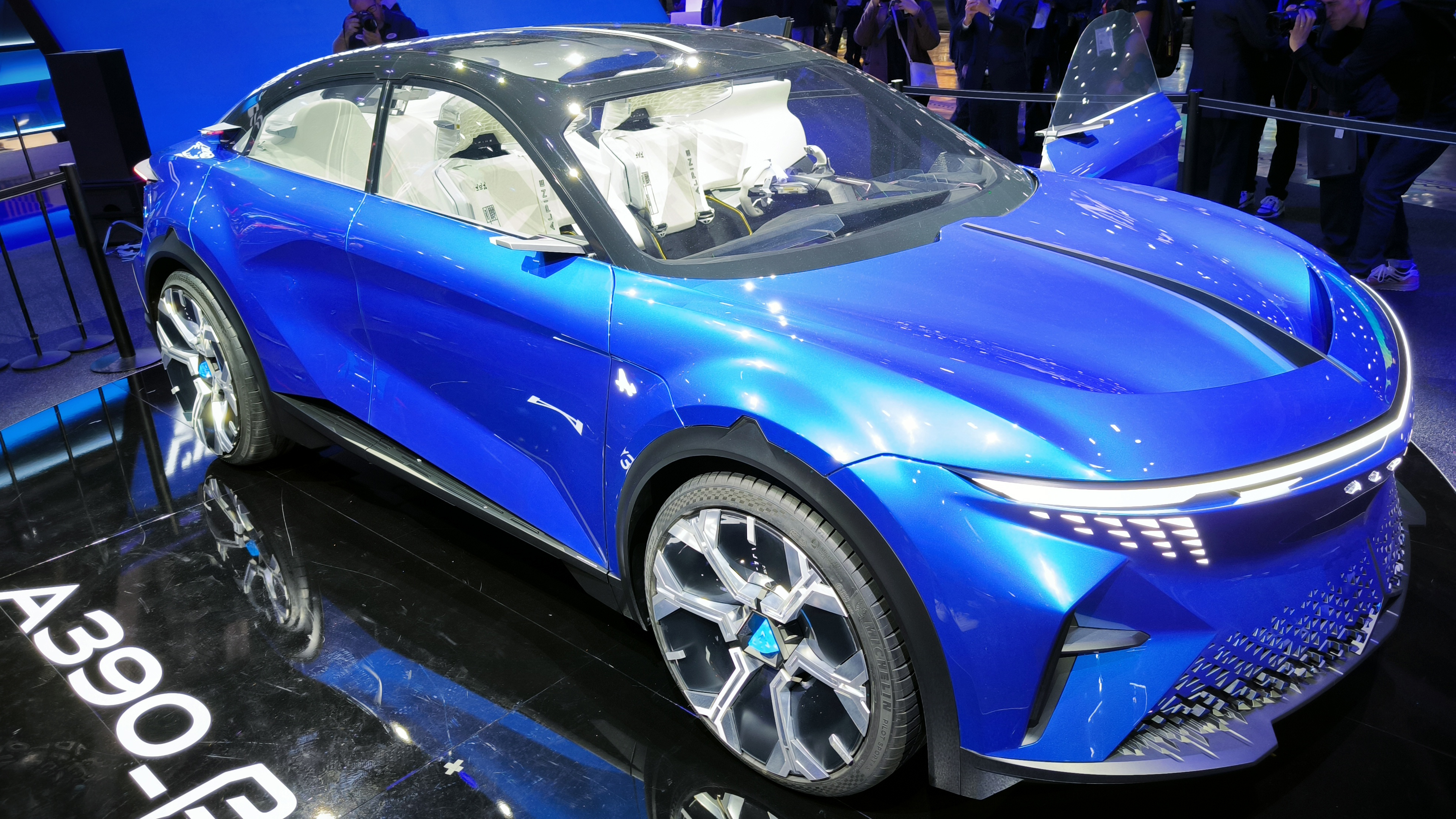
Alpine A390_β

Alpine A310 Vision

=== Racing models ===
Year	Car	Image	Category
1963	Alpine M63		Group 6
1964	Alpine M64		Group 6
1965	Alpine M65		Group 6
1966	Alpine A110 1300		Group 4
1966	Alpine A210		Group 6
1968	Alpine A220		Group 6
1970	Alpine A110 1600		Group 4
1974	Alpine A441		Group 5
1976	Renault Alpine A442		Group 6
1977	Alpine A310 V6		Group 4
1978	Renault Alpine A442B		Group 6
1978	Renault Alpine A443		Group 6
1982	Alpine A310 V6		Group B
1993	Alpine A610		Group B
2013	Alpine A450		LMP2
2014	Alpine A450b		LMP2
2016	Alpine A460		LMP2
2017	Alpine A470		LMP2
2018	Alpine A110 Cup		Alpine Elf Europa Cup
2018	Alpine A110 GT4		SRO GT4
2020	Alpine A110 Rally		Group R-GT
2021	Alpine A480		LMP1
2021	Alpine A521		Formula One
2022	Alpine A522		Formula One
2023	Alpine A523		Formula One
2023	Renault Clio Rally3		Group Rally3
2024	Alpine A424		LMDh
2024	Alpine A524		Formula One
2025	Alpine A525		Formula One
2026	Alpine A526		Formula One

== Awards ==
European Car of the Year

- 2025 : Alpine A290

== Alpines outside France ==
=== Brazil ===
The Alpine 108 was produced in Brazil from 1962 to 1966, under license by Willys-Overland do Brasil, branded "Willys Interlagos". It was the first Brazilian sports car.

=== Bulgaria ===
Bulgaria produced its own version of an Alpine, known as Bulgaralpine from 1967 to 1969. About 150 vehicles were produced.

=== Canada ===
A few examples of the Alpine GTA were imported into the Canadian province of Quebec, with the expectation that AMC/Renault would be adding the model to their Canadian lineup. The GTA was designed by Renault to meet North American standards, however plans to import the GTA to North America were cancelled by Chrysler shortly after their takeover of AMC.

=== Mexico ===
Mexico produced its own version of the Renault Alpine, known as Dinalpin, from 1965 to 1974, assembled by DINA S.A., which also manufactured other Renault models under license. About 600 vehicles were produced.

== Sponsorship ==
In 2025, Alpine will sponsor Pramac Racing for the second time, despite now being a Yamaha satellite team in MotoGP 2025. Alpine has confirmed it will work with the Pramac MotoGP team for the 2025 season, becoming the Italian team's "main partner".

== Bibliography ==
- Robert Weber (December 2017). Automobilsport Racing / History / Passion #14: Renault Alpine sports prototypes 1973–1978. Sportfahrer Verlag. ISSN 2199-126X.
- Robert Weber (December 2025). Automobilsport Racing / History / Passion #46: Alpine in racing and rallying 1952–1978. Sportfahrer Verlag. ISSN 2199-126X.
