= Rally of Indonesia =

Rallying event held in Indonesia

Rally of Indonesia (also known as the Indonesia Rally) is the largest rallying event held in Indonesia. Currently part of the Asia Pacific Rally Championship (APRC), it has twice been incorporated into the World Rally Championship (WRC) calendar, in 1996 and 1997; a planned running in 1998 was cancelled due to political crisis that year.

This rally is mostly held in North Sumatra, although it was also held several times in South Sumatra and South Sulawesi.

The APRC event on 25–26 September 2010 was to be observed by the FIA as a candidate event for an inclusion to the WRC 2012 calendar, although ultimately neither event were held; the rally returned as a national event in 2013.

After nine years of absence, it was announced that Indonesia would return to the APRC in 2019 as the Rally of Indonesia, which will be held at its traditional base in North Sumatra.

== List of previous winners ==
Year	Name	Winner	Co-Driver	Car	Rally Classification
1986	11th Rally Indonesia / Trans Sumatra Rally	(Indonesia) Beng Soeswanto	(Indonesia) Adiguna Sutowo	Ford Laser TX3	International
1987	12th Rally Indonesia	(Netherlands) John Bosch	(United Kingdom) Kevin Gormley	Audi Quattro	International
1988	13th Rally Indonesia	(Indonesia) Beng Soeswanto	(Indonesia) Adiguna Sutowo	MG Metro 6r4	International
1989	14th Rally Indonesia	(Australia) Ross Dunkerton	(Malaysia) Mej Zainuddin	Mitsubishi Galant VR-4	APRC
1990	15th Rally Indonesia	(Japan) Kenjiro Shinozuka	(United Kingdom) John Meadows	Mitsubishi Galant VR-4	APRC
1991	16th Bank Utama Rally Indonesia	(Australia) Ross Dunkerton	(Australia) Fred Gocentas	Mitsubishi Galant VR-4	APRC
1992	17th Bentoel Rally Indonesia	(Australia) Ross Dunkerton	(Australia) Fred Gocentas	Mitsubishi Galant VR-4	APRC
1993	18th Bentoel Rally Indonesia	(New Zealand) Possum Bourne	(New Zealand) Rodger Freeth	Subaru Legacy RS	APRC
1994	19th Bentoel Rally Indonesia	(Sweden) Kenneth Eriksson	(Sweden) Staffan Parmander	Mitsubishi Lancer Evolution II	APRC & WRC candidate
1995	20th Bank Utama Rally Indonesia	(United Kingdom) Colin McRae	(United Kingdom) Derek Ringer	Subaru Impreza 555	APRC & WRC candidate
1996	21st Bank Utama Rally Indonesia	(Spain) Carlos Sainz	(Spain) Luis Moya	Ford Escort RS Cosworth	WRC
1997	22nd Rally Indonesia	(Spain) Carlos Sainz	(Spain) Luis Moya	Ford Escort WRC	WRC
2000	23rd Gudang Garam International Rally Indonesia	(Malaysia) Karamjit Singh	(Malaysia) Allen Oh	Proton PERT	National
2001	24th Gudang Garam International Rally Indonesia	(Indonesia) Chandra Alim	(Indonesia) Prihatim Kasiman	Mitsubishi Lancer Evolution VI	National
2002	25th Gudang Garam International Rally Indonesia	(Indonesia) Rifat Sungkar	(Indonesia) Mohamad Herkusuma	Mitsubishi Lancer Evolution IV	National
2003	26th Gudang Garam International Rally Indonesia	(Indonesia) Rifat Sungkar	(Indonesia) Karel Hailatu	Mitsubishi Lancer Evolution IV	National
2004	27th Gudang Garam International Rally Indonesia	(Indonesia) Hery Agung	(Indonesia) Hade Mboi	Mitsubishi Lancer Evolution VI	National
2005	28th Gudang Garam International Rally Indonesia	(Finland) Jussi Välimäki	(Finland) Jarkko Kalliolepo	Mitsubishi Lancer Evolution VIII	APRC
2006	29th Gudang Garam International Rally Indonesia	(Japan) Toshihiro Arai	(New Zealand) Tony Sircombe	Subaru Impreza WRX STi N12	APRC
2007	30th Gudang Garam International Rally Indonesia	(Finland) Jussi Välimäki	(Finland) Jarkko Kalliolepo	Mitsubishi Lancer Evolution IX	APRC
2008	31st Gudang Garam International Rally Indonesia	(India) Gaurav Singh Gill	(India) Jagder Singh	Mitsubishi Lancer Evolution IX	APRC
2009	32nd Gudang Garam International Rally Indonesia	(Australia) Cody Crocker	(Australia) Ben Atkinson	Subaru Impreza WRX STi N12	APRC
2013	Indonesia Rally	(Indonesia) Rizal Sungkar	(Indonesia) Endrue Fasa	Mitsubishi Lancer Evolution X	National
2014	Indonesia Rally	(Indonesia) Subhan Aksa	(Indonesia) Hade Mboi	Mitsubishi Lancer Evolution X	National
2015	Indonesia Rally	(Indonesia) Subhan Aksa	(Indonesia) Hade Mboi	Mitsubishi Lancer Evolution X	National
2019	Rally of Indonesia	(Indonesia) Subhan Aksa	(Indonesia) Mago Sarwono	Mitsubishi Lancer Evolution X	APRC
