= Opossum (disambiguation) =

Opossums are marsupials of the order Didelphimorphia, native to the Western Hemisphere.

Opossum may also refer to:

== Animals ==
- Shrew opossum
- Colocolo opossum, native to South America
- Opossum rat, a species of rodent
- Monommatinae, also known as the opossum beetle
- Mysida, also known as opossum shrimp, a group of small, shrimp-like crustaceans

== Places ==
- Opossum Bay, a town in Tasmania, Australia
- Opossum Creek (disambiguation)
- Opossum Run, a stream in Ohio

== Other uses ==
- HMS Opossum, any of several submarines of the British Royal Navy

== See also ==
- Possum (disambiguation)
- Opossom (band), a New Zealand band including musician Kody Nielson
