= 2008 Asia-Pacific Rally Championship =

2008 Asia-Pacific Rally season

Seasons
- ← 2007 2009 →

The 2008 Asia-Pacific Rally Championship season (APRC) was an international rally championship organized by the FIA. The champion was Australian driver Cody Crocker. In winning the 2008 Malaysian Rally, Crocker successfully defended his title from the previous two years, to equal the record of three APRC titles set by Possum Bourne, Kenneth Eriksson and Karamjit Singh.

== Calendar ==
The 2008 APRC was as follows:

| Round | Date | Event | Location | Winner |
|---|---|---|---|---|
| 1 | April 12–13 | Rallye de Nouvelle Calédonie | (France) Nouméa, New Caledonia | (Japan) Katsuhiko Taguchi |
| 2 | May 10–11 | Rally of Canberra | Canberra, Australia | (Australia) Cody Crocker |
| 3 | June 7–8 | Rally of Whangārei | Whangārei, New Zealand | (Australia) Cody Crocker |
| 4 | July 11–13 | Rally Hokkaido | Hokkaidō, Japan | (Japan) Katsuhiko Taguchi |
| 5 | August 22–24 | Rally of Indonesia | Indonesia | (India) Gaurav Singh Gill |
| 6 | October 11–12 | Malaysian Rally | Malaysia | (Australia) Cody Crocker |
| 7 | November 8–9 | China Rally | China | (Australia) Cody Crocker |

== Points ==
The 2008 APRC for Drivers points was as follows:

| Position | Driver | Vehicle | Round 1 | Round 2 | Round 3 | Round 4 | Round 5 | Round 6 | Round 7 | Total |
|---|---|---|---|---|---|---|---|---|---|---|
| 1 | (Australia) Cody Crocker | Subaru Impreza WRX | | 16 | 16 | 8 | 9 | 15 | 15 | 79 |
| 2 | (Japan) Katsuhiko Taguchi | Mitsubishi Lancer Evo | 16 | 2 | 12 | 13 | 12 | 3 | | 58 |
| 3 | (Japan) Hiroshi Yanagisawa | Subaru Impreza WRX | | 6 | 4 | 12 | | 11 | 13 | 46 |
| 4 | (Australia) Dean Herridge | Subaru Impreza WRX | 11 | 10 | 5 | 6 | | | 8 | 40 |
| 5 | (Indonesia) Rifat Sungkar | Subaru Impreza WRX | | 5 | 3 | 4 | 5 | 7 | 4 | 28 |
| 6 | (New Zealand) Brian Green | Mitsubishi Lancer Evo | 7 | 4 | 2 | | 4 | | 3 | 20 |
| 7 | (Australia) Scott Peddar | Mitsubishi Lancer Evo | 2 | 2 | 8 | | 3 | 4 | | 19 |
| 8 | (India) Gaurav Gill | Mitsubishi Lancer Evo | | | | 2 | 15 | | | 17 |
| 9 | (Japan) Takuma Kamada | Subaru Impreza WRX | | | | | | 5 | 5 | 10 |
