= Alister McRae =

British rally driver (born 1970)

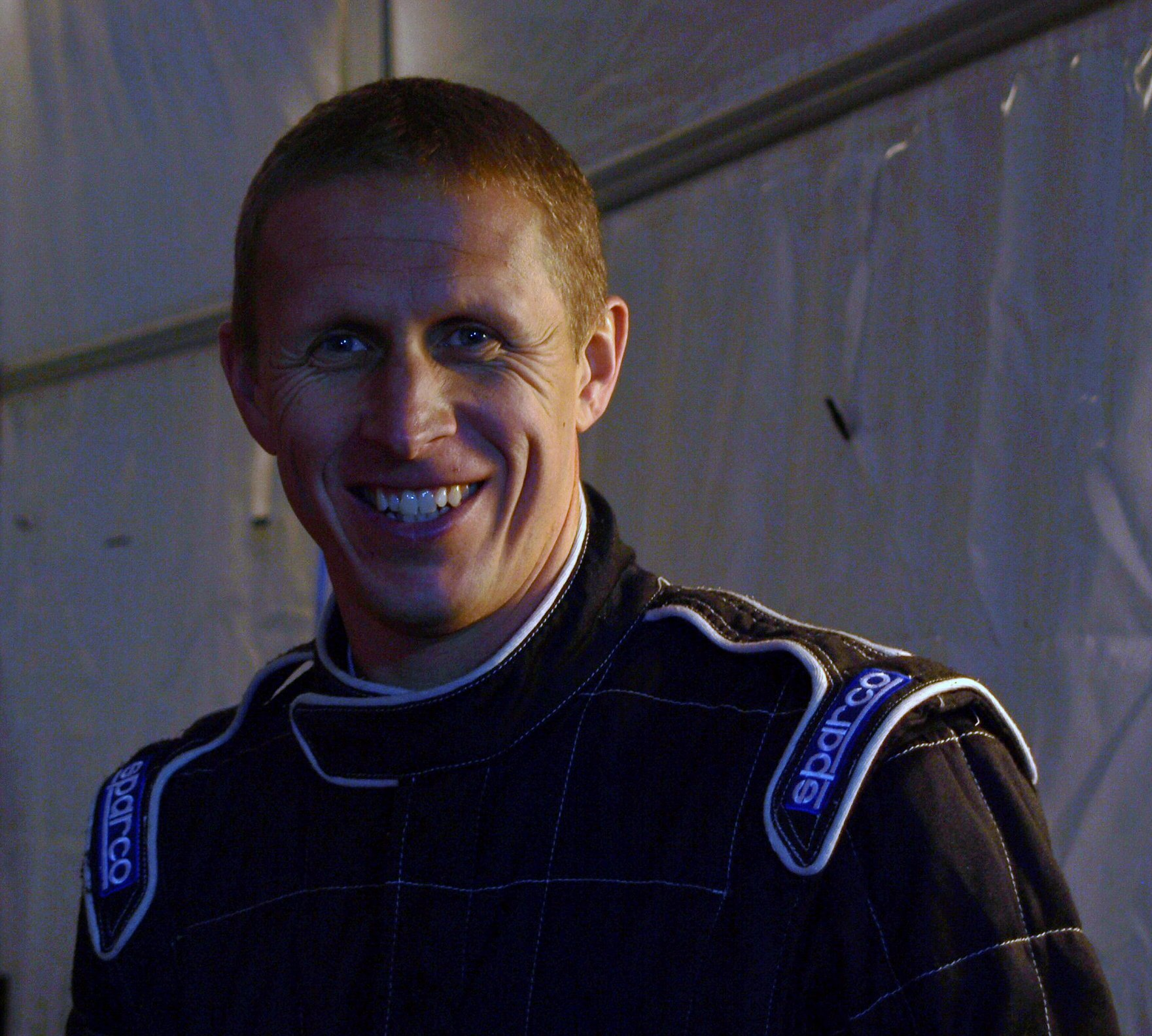
- Alister McRae at the service area during the 2010 Rally Scotland

Personal information
- Nationality: (Scotland) Scottish (United Kingdom) British
- Full name: Alister Ritchie McRae
- Born: 20 December 1970 (age 55); Lanark, Lanarkshire, Scotland

World Rally Championship record
- Years active: 1991–2004, 2006–2007, 2012
- Co-driver: (United Kingdom) David Senior (United Kingdom) Chris Wood (United Kingdom) Chris Patterson (United Kingdom) Gordon Noble (New Zealand) Erin Kyle (Australia) William Hayes
- Teams: Subaru, Hyundai World Rally Team, Mitsubishi
- Rallies: 78
- Championships: 0
- Stage wins: 5
- Total points: 19
- First rally: 1991 RAC Rally
- Last rally: 2012 Rally New Zealand

Alister Ritchie McRae (born 20 December 1970) is a Scottish rally driver from Scotland who competed in the World Rally Championship. He is the son of the five-time British Rally Champion Jimmy McRae and the younger brother of the late 1995 World Rally Champion, Colin McRae, and older brother of property entrepreneur Stuart McRae. His uncle Hugh "Shug" Steele is also a former rally driver.

== Career ==
Born in Lanark, McRae took his first foray into motorsport at the age of 12, when he took up motorcycle trials and motocross. But it was always rallying where he would demonstrate his true colours. Starting out by competing in Scottish Rally Championship events, success wasn't long in coming. In 1992, he won the prestigious Shell Scholarship and the production category of Great Britain's round of the World Rally Championship.

The following years saw further triumphs, culminating with McRae winning the British Rally Championship outright in 1995, at the wheel of a works Nissan Sunny. More manufacturer drives ensued, with a two-year contract being signed to drive the Formula 2 Volkswagen Golf. He famously competed alongside his brother on a one-off basis in the Subaru World Rally Team on the Rally of Great Britain of 1998.

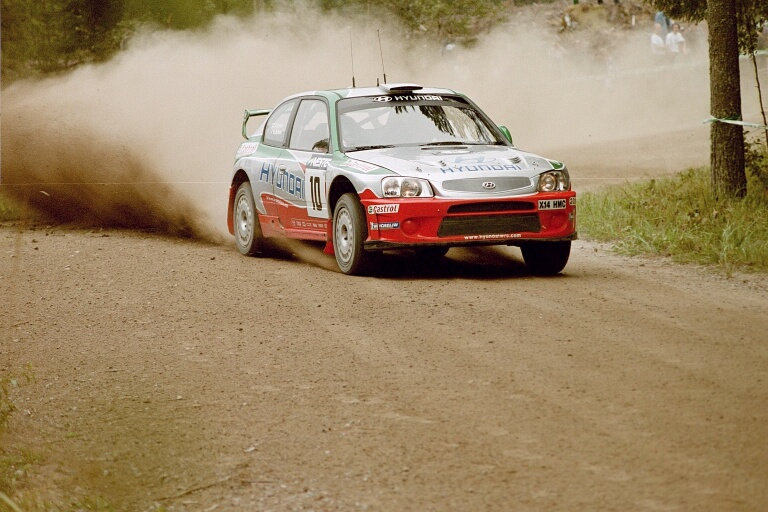
McRae with a Hyundai Accent WRC at the 2001 Rally Finland

McRae's results and reputation led to his services being secured by the newest manufacturer to join the World Rally Championship, Hyundai. In 1999, he competed in the front wheel drive Coupe while simultaneously developing Hyundai's first world rally car, the Accent WRC, alongside veteran Swede Kenneth Eriksson. Then in 2000, he developed the car further during its first year of actual competition, scoring the manufacturer's first ever WRC points. In 2001, the fruits of two years' hard work began to show, with a series of points-scoring finishes (both drivers particularly impressing in the laborious conditions of that year's wet Rally Portugal) and a narrow miss of the podium on his home event, the Rally of Great Britain (which gave the Accent WRC and Hyundai's best finish in the WRC by that time).

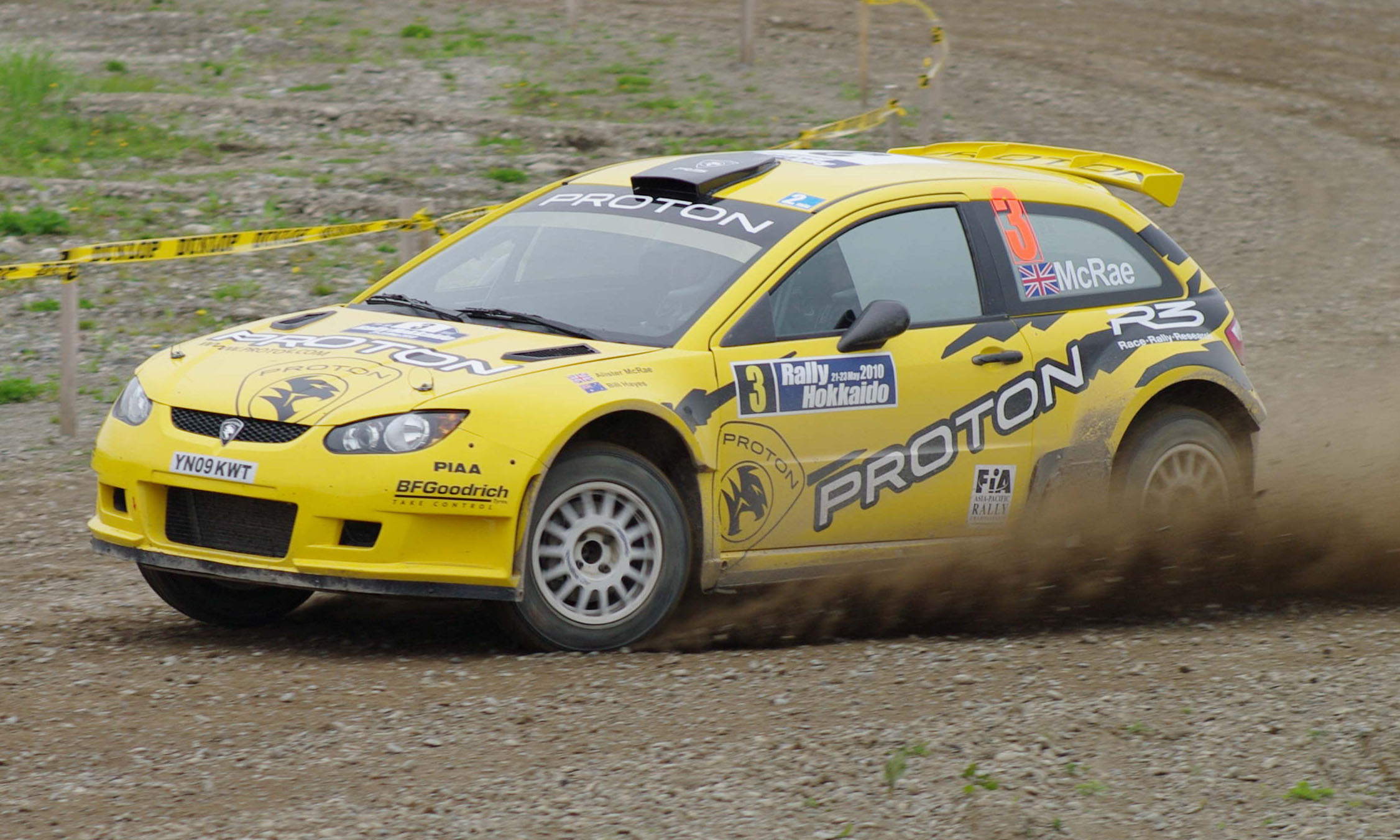
McRae competing in the 2010 Rally Hokkaido

Following his performances with Hyundai, McRae was selected to join Mitsubishi, stalwart of the WRC, in 2002. This transpired to be a difficult year, as the Japanese manufacturer found itself in turmoil, with an uncompetitive new car and a massive management re-structure. Things got even worse for the team when McRae was forced to pull out for the rest of the season due to injuries following a mountain bike crash shortly after that year's Rally San Remo therefore further hindering the team's championship effort. Mitsubishi subsequently pulled out of rallying at the beginning of the 2003 season, to build a new rally car from scratch, leaving McRae to piece together a sporadic privateer campaign at World Championship level, which was rewarded with a points-scoring showing in a Lancer Evolution in New Zealand.

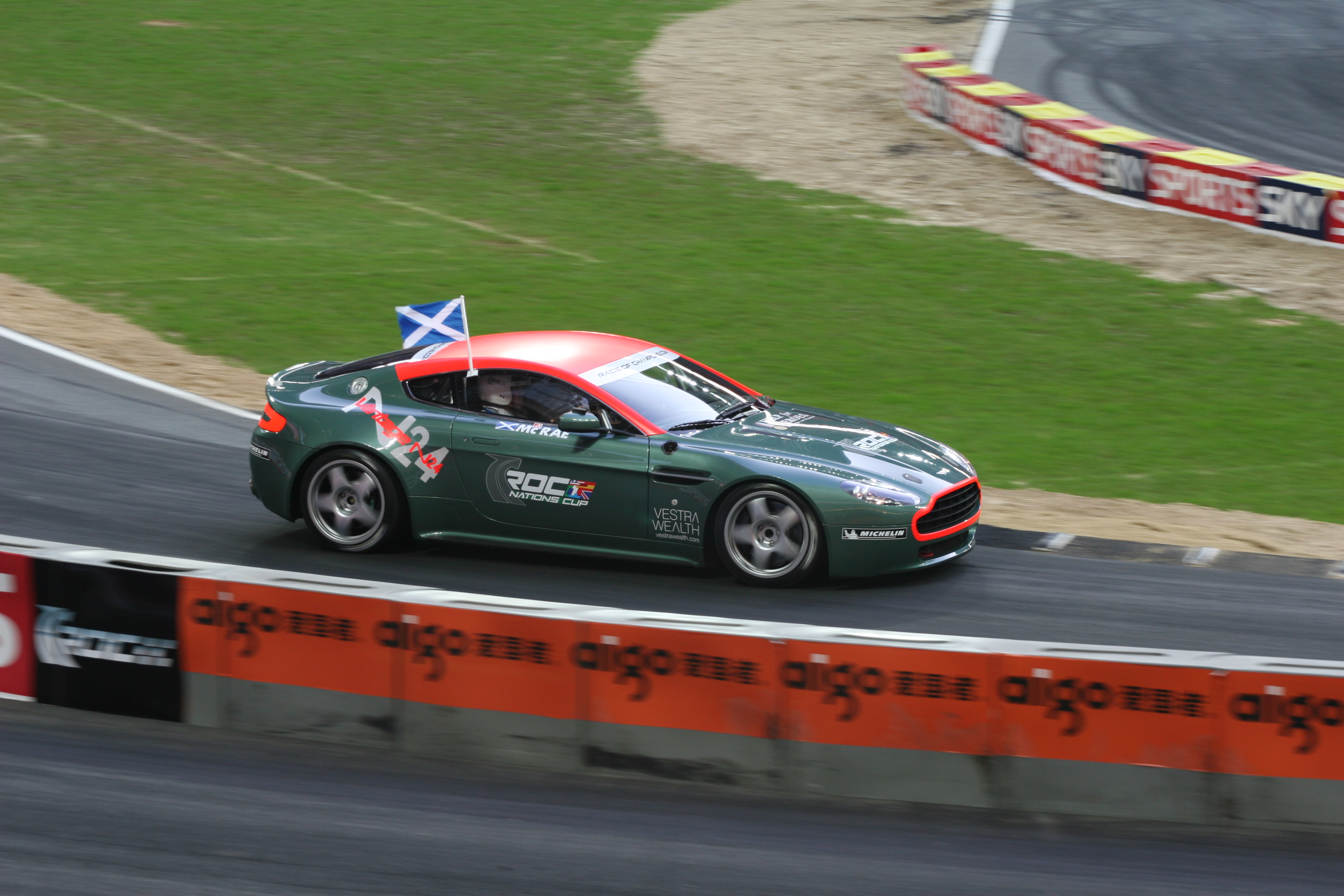
McRae at the 2007 Race of Champions

Undaunted by Mitsubishi's subsequent implicit resolve not to recall either himself or 2002 teammate François Delecour as the source of one of the few remaining factory opportunities sought to regroup for the 2004 season, McRae entered the 2004 Production World Rally Championship instead. He was on course to take the title on the last event before a mechanical failure struck, handing the title to Niall McShea.

In 2006, McRae successfully competed in the Chinese Rally Championship with the Wanyu Rally Team in a Mitsubishi Evo 9, along with a number of other selected international events. McRae also added to his tally of World championship appearances in the new Toyota Corolla S2000 at the 2006 Wales Rally GB, racking up four Group N stage wins.

McRae filled in for his brother Colin alongside F1 driver David Coulthard at the 2007 Race of Champions held at Wembley following Colin's death just two months earlier.

McRae participated in 2009 Dakar Rally.

McRae drove a Proton Satria Neo Super 2000 at the Indonesian leg of the APRC 2009.

McRae made his FIA World Rallycross Championship debut in the ninth round of the 2017 season in France.

== Personal life ==
McRae is the father of Max McRae who is also a motorsport racer.

== Racing record ==
=== Complete WRC results ===
Year	Entrant	Car	1	2	3	4	5	6	7	8	9	10	11	12	13	14	15	16	WDC	Pts
1991	Alister McRae	Subaru Legacy RS	MON	SWE	POR	KEN	FRA	GRC	NZL	ARG	FIN	AUS	ITA	CIV	ESP	GBR; Ret			NC	0
1992	Alister McRae	Ford Sierra RS Cosworth	MON	SWE	POR	KEN	FRA	GRE	NZL	ARG	FIN	AUS	ITA	CIV	ESP	GBR; 14			NC	0
1993	Alister McRae	Ford Sierra RS Cosworth	MON	SWE; EX	POR	KEN	FRA	GRE	ARG	NZL	FIN	AUS	ITA	ESP					NC	0
1993	555 Subaru World Rally Team	Subaru Legacy RS													GBR; 10				NC	0
1994	Nissan F2	Nissan Sunny GTi	MON	POR	KEN	FRA	GRE	ARG	NZL	FIN; 15	ITA; 12	GBR; Ret							NC	0
1995	Alister McRae	Ford Escort RS Cosworth	MON	SWE	POR	FRA	NZL	AUS	ESP	GBR; 4									10th	10
1996	SanYang MIT Motorsport	Honda Civic VTi	SWE	KEN	IDN	GRE	ARG	FIN	AUS; Ret	ITA	ESP								NC	0
1997	S.B.G. Sport	Volkswagen Golf Kit Car	MON	SWE; 21	KEN	POR; 9	ESP	FRA	ARG	GRE	NZL	FIN	IDN	ITA	AUS; Ret	GBR; EX			NC	0
1998	S.B.G. Sport	Volkswagen Golf Kit Car	MON	SWE; Ret	KEN	POR			ARG; Ret	GRE	NZL	FIN; 13	ITA; 22	AUS; 17					NC	0
1998	Hyundai Motor Sport	Hyundai Coupé Kit Car					ESP; 19	FRA; 15											NC	0
1998	555 Subaru World Rally Team	Subaru Impreza WRC 98													GBR; Ret				NC	0
1999	Hyundai Motor Sport	Hyundai Coupé Kit Car Evo 2	MON	SWE; Ret	KEN	POR; 13	ESP; Ret	FRA	ARG	GRE; Ret	NZL; 20	FIN; 20	CHN; 10	ITA; Ret	AUS; 14	GBR; Ret			NC	0
2000	Hyundai Castrol World Rally Team	Hyundai Accent WRC	MON	SWE; 14	KEN	POR; Ret	ESP; Ret	ARG; 7	GRE; Ret	NZL; Ret	FIN; 9	CYP	FRA; 12	ITA; 16	AUS; Ret	GBR; 11			NC	0
2001	Hyundai Castrol World Rally Team	Hyundai Accent WRC	MON; 7	SWE; Ret															17th	4
2001	Hyundai Castrol World Rally Team	Hyundai Accent WRC2			POR; 6	ESP; 11	ARG; 9	CYP; 7	GRE; 15	KEN	FIN; 13	NZL; 9	ITA; Ret	FRA; 9	AUS; 10	GBR; 4			17th	4
2002	Marlboro Mitsubishi Ralliart	Mitsubishi Lancer WRC	MON; 14	SWE; 5	FRA; 10	ESP; 13	CYP; Ret	ARG; 8	GRE; Ret	KEN; 9									15th	2
2002	Marlboro Mitsubishi Ralliart	Mitsubishi Lancer WRC2									FIN; Ret	GER; Ret	ITA; Ret	NZL	AUS	GBR			15th	2
2003	Mitsubishi Ralliart Europe	Mitsubishi Lancer WRC2	MON	SWE	TUR	NZL; 6	ARG	GRE	CYP	GER	FIN	AUS	ITA	FRA	ESP	GBR			17th	3
2004	R.E.D. World Rally Team	Subaru Impreza WRX STi	MON	SWE; 17	MEX; Ret	NZL; 13	CYP	GRE	TUR	ARG	FIN	GER; 17	JPN	GBR; 14	ITA	FRA; 15	ESP	AUS; Ret	NC	0
2006	Alister McRae	Toyota Corolla S2000	MON	SWE	MEX	ESP	FRA	ARG	ITA	GRE	GER	FIN	JPN	CYP	TUR	AUS	NZL	GBR; Ret	NC	0
2007	Taylor Motorsport	Mitsubishi Lancer Evo IX	MON	SWE	NOR	MEX	POR	ARG	ITA	GRE	FIN	GER	NZL; 21	ESP	FRA	JPN	IRE	GBR	NC	0
2012	Proton Motorsports	Proton Satria Neo S2000	MON	SWE; 37	MEX	POR	ARG	GRE	NZL; Ret	FIN	GER	GBR	FRA	ITA	ESP				NC	0

=== PWRC results ===
Year	Entrant	Car	1	2	3	4	5	6	7	PWRC	Points
2004	R.E.D. World Rally Team	Subaru Impreza WRX STi	SWE; 2	MEX; Ret	NZL; 3	ARG	GER; 3	FRA; 3	AUS; Ret	5th	26

=== SWRC results ===
Year	Entrant	Car	1	2	3	4	5	6	7	8	SWRC	Points
2012	Proton Motorsports	Proton Satria Neo S2000	MON	SWE; 7	POR	NZL; Ret	FIN	GBR	FRA	ESP	13th	6

=== APRC results ===
Year	Entrant	Car	1	2	3	4	5	6	7	APRC	Points
1996	SanYang MIT Motorsport	Honda Civic VTi	THA	IDN	MYS	NZL	AUS; Ret	BEI		-	0
1997	S.B.G. Sport	Volkswagen Golf Kit Car	THA	CHI	NZL	MYS	IDN	AUS; Ret		-	0
1997	S.B.G. Sport	Volkswagen Golf Kit Car	THA	CHI	NZL	MYS	AUS; 10			-	0
2009	Proton R3 Malaysia	Proton Satria Neo S2000	NCL	AUS	NZL	JPN	MYS	IDN; Ret	CHN	-	0
2010	Proton R3 Malaysia	Proton Satria Neo S2000	MAL; Ret	JPN; Ret	NZL; 2	AUS; Ret	NCL	IDN	CHN; 1	3rd	78
2011	Proton Motorsport	Proton Satria Neo S2000	MAL; 3	AUS; 4	NCL; 3	NZL; 5	JPN; 2	CHN; 1		1st	153
2012	Proton Motorsport	Proton Satria Neo S2000	NZL; 4	NCL; Ret	AUS; 2	MYS; 1	JPN; Ret	CHN; 1		2nd	120

=== Complete FIA World Rallycross Championship results ===
(key)

==== Supercar ====
Year	Entrant	Car	1	2	3	4	5	6	7	8	9	10	11	12	WRX	Points
2017	Loco World RX Team	Volkswagen Polo	BAR	POR	HOC	BEL	GBR	NOR	SWE	CAN	FRA; 24	LAT	GER	RSA	41st	0

Awards and achievements
Preceded by Malcolm Wilson	Autosport; National Rally Driver of the Year; 1995	Succeeded by Gwyndaf Evans
Sporting positions
Preceded by Jarmo Kytölehto	Race of Champions; Rally Master; 1998	Succeeded by Armin Schwarz
Preceded by Katsuhiko Taguchi	Asia-Pacific Rally Champion; 2011	Succeeded by Chris Atkinson
