= Possum =

Possum may refer to:

== Animals ==
=== American possums ===
- Opossum, or Didelphimorphia, an order of marsupials native to the Americas
  - Didelphis, a genus of marsupials within Didelphimorphia
    - Common opossum, native to Central and South America
    - Virginia opossum, native to North America
    - White-eared opossum, native to South America

=== Australasian possums ===
- Phalangeriformes, also called (o)possums, any of a number of arboreal marsupial species native to Australia, New Guinea, and Sulawesi
  - Common brushtail possum (Trichosurus vulpecula), a common possum in Australian urban areas, invasive in New Zealand
  - Common ringtail possum (Pseudocheirus peregrinus), also common in Australian urban areas, absent from New Zealand
  - Phalangeridae (possums and cuscuses), a family of marsupials native to Australia and New Guinea containing most of the species referred to as "possums" in Australia

== People ==
- Possum Bourne (1956–2003), New Zealand rally car driver
- George Jones (1931–2013), known as "The Possum", American country music singer
- Possum Jones (1934–1997), American NASCAR driver
- Clifford Possum Tjapaltjarri (1932–2002), Indigenous Australian painter
- Possum Whitted (1890–1962), American baseball player

== Arts and entertainment ==
=== Film and television ===
- Possum (film), a 2018 British psychological horror film
- Possums (film), a 1998 sports comedy
- "The Possum", an episode of Parks and Recreation

=== Music ===
- "Possum", a 1987 song on Trey Anastasio's 1987 album The Man Who Stepped into Yesterday
- "Possum", a 1989 song by Australian band feedtime from their album Suction
- "Possum", a 1995 song by Juned
- "The Possum", a 2015 song by Sun Kil Moon from Universal Themes

== Other uses ==
- POSSUM, or Patient Operated Selector Mechanism, a communications device for people with disabilities

== See also ==
- Opossum (disambiguation)
