= Opossum Creek =

Opossum Creek may refer to:

- Opossum Creek (Little Osage River), a stream in Kansas
- Opossum Creek (Big Creek), a stream in Missouri
- Opossum Creek (Conewago Creek tributary), a stream in Pennsylvania

== See also ==
- Opossum Branch
- Opossum Run
