= 2001 Rally New Zealand =

10th round of the 2001 World Rally Championship

2001 Rally New Zealand 32nd Propecia Rally New Zealand
Round 10 of the 2001 World Rally Championship season
| ← Previous event | Next event → |
- Host country: New Zealand
- Rally base: Auckland
- Dates run: September 21, 2001 – September 23, 2001
- Stages: 24 (382.46 km; 237.65 miles)
- Stage surface: Gravel
- Overall distance: 1,690.14 km (1,050.20 miles)

Statistics
- Crews: 68 at start, 48 at finish

Overall results
- Overall winner: (United Kingdom) Richard Burns (United Kingdom) Robert Reid (Japan) Subaru World Rally Team; Subaru Impreza S7 WRC '01

The 2001 Rally New Zealand (formally the 32nd Propecia Rally New Zealand) was the tenth round of the 2001 World Rally Championship. The race was held over three days between 21 September and 23 September 2001, and was won by Subaru's Richard Burns, his 10th and last win in the World Rally Championship.

== Background ==
=== Entry list ===
| No. | Driver | Co-Driver | Entrant | Car | Tyre |
|---|---|---|---|---|---|
World Rally Championship manufacturer entries
| 1 | (Finland) Marcus Grönholm | (Finland) Timo Rautiainen | (France) Peugeot Total | Peugeot 206 WRC | MI |
| 2 | (France) Didier Auriol | (France) Denis Giraudet | (France) Peugeot Total | Peugeot 206 WRC | MI |
| 3 | (Spain) Carlos Sainz | (Spain) Luis Moya | (United Kingdom) Ford Motor Co. Ltd. | Ford Focus RS WRC '01 | P |
| 4 | (United Kingdom) Colin McRae | (United Kingdom) Nicky Grist | (United Kingdom) Ford Motor Co. Ltd. | Ford Focus RS WRC '01 | P |
| 5 | (United Kingdom) Richard Burns | (United Kingdom) Robert Reid | (Japan) Subaru World Rally Team | Subaru Impreza S7 WRC '01 | P |
| 6 | (Norway) Petter Solberg | (United Kingdom) Phil Mills | (Japan) Subaru World Rally Team | Subaru Impreza S7 WRC '01 | P |
| 7 | (Finland) Tommi Mäkinen | (Finland) Risto Mannisenmäki | (Japan) Marlboro Mitsubishi Ralliart | Mitsubishi Lancer Evo 6.5 | MI |
| 9 | (Sweden) Kenneth Eriksson | (Sweden) Staffan Parmander | (South Korea) Hyundai Castrol World Rally Team | Hyundai Accent WRC2 | MI |
| 10 | (United Kingdom) Alister McRae | (United Kingdom) David Senior | (South Korea) Hyundai Castrol World Rally Team | Hyundai Accent WRC2 | MI |
| 19 | (Finland) Toni Gardemeister | (Finland) Paavo Lukander | (Japan) Marlboro Mitsubishi Ralliart | Mitsubishi Carisma GT Evo VI | MI |
World Rally Championship entries
| 8 | (Belgium) Freddy Loix | (Belgium) Sven Smeets | (Japan) Marlboro Mitsubishi Ralliart | Mitsubishi Carisma GT Evo VI | MI |
| 16 | (Finland) Harri Rovanperä | (Finland) Risto Pietiläinen | (France) Peugeot Total | Peugeot 206 WRC | MI |
| 17 | (France) François Delecour | (France) Daniel Grataloup | (United Kingdom) Ford Motor Co. Ltd. | Ford Focus RS WRC '01 | P |
| 18 | (Japan) Toshihiro Arai | (Australia) Glenn Macneall | (Japan) Subaru World Rally Team | Subaru Impreza S7 WRC '01 | P |
| 20 | (New Zealand) Peter 'Possum' Bourne | (New Zealand) Craig Vincent | Subaru Rally Team Australia | Subaru Impreza S6 WRC '00 | —N/a |
| 21 | (United Kingdom) Neil Wearden | (United Kingdom) Trevor Agnew | (United Kingdom) Neil Wearden | Peugeot 206 WRC | —N/a |
| 31 | (New Zealand) Bruce Herbert | (New Zealand) Robert Ryan | (New Zealand) Rose City Cars | Subaru Impreza STI N8 | —N/a |
| 32 | (New Zealand) Geoff Argyle | (New Zealand) Steve Smith | Mitsubishi Ralliart New Zealand | Mitsubishi Lancer Evo VII | —N/a |
| 33 | (New Zealand) Andrew Hawkeswood | (New Zealand) Samantha Haldane | (New Zealand) Daytona Motor Group | Mitsubishi Lancer Evo VI | —N/a |
| 34 | (New Zealand) Todd Bawden | (New Zealand) Raymond Bennett | (New Zealand) Todd Bawden | Mitsubishi Lancer Evo VI | —N/a |
| 35 | (New Zealand) Lewis Scott | (New Zealand) Jane Black | (New Zealand) Lewis Scott | Mitsubishi Lancer Evo V | —N/a |
| 42 | (New Zealand) Brian Green | (New Zealand) Jane McKay | (New Zealand) Palmerston North Rallysport Club | Mitsubishi Lancer Evo VI | —N/a |
| 44 | (New Zealand) Glenn Smith | (New Zealand) Colin Smith | (New Zealand) Glenn Smith | Mitsubishi Lancer Evo VI | —N/a |
| 46 | (New Zealand) Richard Mason | (New Zealand) Hamish Fenemor | (New Zealand) Richard Mason | Mitsubishi Lancer Evo III | —N/a |
| 47 | (Australia) Brett Middleton | (Australia) Andrew Benefield | (Australia) Brett Middleton | Subaru Impreza WRX | —N/a |
| 48 | (New Zealand) Wayne Parker | (New Zealand) Brendan McKay | (New Zealand) Wayne Parker | Mitsubishi Lancer Evo V | —N/a |
| 52 | (New Zealand) Ian Easton | (New Zealand) Cheryl Easton | (New Zealand) Ian Easton | Mitsubishi Lancer Evo V | —N/a |
| 53 | (New Zealand) Kerry Evans | (New Zealand) Rocky Hudson | (New Zealand) Winger Subaru | Subaru Impreza WRX | —N/a |
| 54 | (New Zealand) Mark Hiestand | (New Zealand) Danielle Bates | (New Zealand) Winger Subaru | Nissan Pulsar GTI-R | —N/a |
| 56 | (New Zealand) Austen Jones | (New Zealand) Bronwyn Snookes | (New Zealand) Anything Subaru | Subaru Impreza WRX | —N/a |
| 57 | (New Zealand) Malcolm Stewart | (New Zealand) Mike Fletcher | (New Zealand) Malcolm Stewart | Mitsubishi Lancer Evo IV | —N/a |
| 59 | (New Zealand) Kevin Bell | (New Zealand) Dean Stockwell | (New Zealand) Kevin Bell | Mitsubishi Lancer Evo V | —N/a |
| 61 | (Australia) Jason Gardner | (Australia) Paul Flintoft | (Australia) Jason Gardner | Nissan Pulsar GTI-R | —N/a |
| 65 | (New Zealand) Keith Stewart | (New Zealand) Len Fisher | (New Zealand) Keith Stewart | Subaru Legacy RS | —N/a |
| 67 | (United Kingdom) Bruce Warburton | (Netherlands) Harmannus Slebos | (United Kingdom) Bruce Warburton | Subaru Impreza WRX | —N/a |
| 69 | (New Zealand) Rex Vizible | (New Zealand) Dave Robb | (New Zealand) Vizible Racing | Subaru Impreza WRX STI | —N/a |
Group N Cup entries
| 22 | (Austria) Manfred Stohl | (Austria) Peter Müller | (Austria) Manfred Stohl | Mitsubishi Lancer Evo VI | —N/a |
| 23 | (Argentina) Gabriel Pozzo | (Argentina) Daniel Stillo | (Argentina) Gabriel Pozzo | Mitsubishi Lancer Evo VI | —N/a |
| 25 | (Argentina) Marcos Ligato | (Argentina) Rubén García | (Argentina) Marcos Ligato | Mitsubishi Lancer Evo VI | —N/a |
| 26 | (Sweden) Stig Blomqvist | (Venezuela) Ana Goñi | (United Kingdom) David Sutton Cars Ltd | Mitsubishi Lancer Evo VI | —N/a |
| 27 | (Australia) Cody Crocker | (Australia) Greg Foletta | Subaru Rally Team Australia | Subaru Impreza STI N8 | —N/a |
| 28 | (New Zealand) Reece Jones | (New Zealand) Leo Bult | (New Zealand) Reece Jones | Mitsubishi Lancer Evo VI | —N/a |
| 29 | (Japan) Fumio Nutahara | (Japan) Satoshi Hayashi | (Japan) Advan-Piaa Rally Team | Mitsubishi Lancer Evo VII | —N/a |
| 30 | (Italy) Giovanni Manfrinato | (Italy) Claudio Condotta | (Italy) Giovanni Manfrinato | Mitsubishi Lancer Evo VI | —N/a |
| 37 | (Italy) Luca Baldini | (Italy) Massimo Agostinelli | (Italy) Luca Baldini | Mitsubishi Lancer Evo VI | —N/a |
| 39 | (New Zealand) Chris West | (New Zealand) Chris Cobham | (New Zealand) Rose City Cars | Subaru Impreza WRX STI | —N/a |
| 40 | (New Zealand) Ross Meekings | (New Zealand) Alan Glen | Ralliart New Zealand | Mitsubishi Lancer Evo VI | —N/a |
| 41 | (United Kingdom) Natalie Barratt | (New Zealand) Chris Patterson | (United Kingdom) Natalie Barratt Rallysport | Mitsubishi Lancer Evo VI | —N/a |
| 43 | (New Zealand) Kevin Holmes | (New Zealand) Garry Cowan | Ralliart New Zealand | Mitsubishi Lancer Evo VI | —N/a |
| 49 | (New Zealand) Cameron Bates | (New Zealand) Laurie Brenssell | (New Zealand) Cameron Bates | Subaru Impreza STI | —N/a |
| 50 | (New Zealand) Mike Turfus | (New Zealand) Fleur Pedersen | (United Kingdom) Silverstone Rally Tyre Team | Mitsubishi Lancer Evo VI | —N/a |
| 51 | (United Kingdom) Graeme Presswell | (United Kingdom) Martin Saunders | (New Zealand) Rally Drive NZ | Mitsubishi Lancer Evo III | —N/a |
| 55 | (New Zealand) Jeff Judd | (New Zealand) Grant Marra | (New Zealand) Jeff Judd | Subaru Impreza WRX | —N/a |
| 58 | (New Zealand) Deborah Kibble | (New Zealand) Jamie Kibble | (New Zealand) Deborah Kibble | Mitsubishi Lancer Evo VI | —N/a |
| 64 | (Japan) Hiromichi Niwa | (Japan) Tadayoshi Sato | (Japan) Hiromichi Niwa | Mitsubishi Lancer Evo VI | —N/a |
| 66 | (Japan) Nobuaki Takahashi | (Japan) Masako Takahashi | (Japan) Nobuaki Takahashi | Mitsubishi Lancer Evo V | —N/a |
| 68 | (Japan) Minoru Shinomiya | (Japan) Yoshinari Kawanishi | (Japan) Minoru Shinomiya | Mitsubishi Lancer Evo VI | —N/a |
| 70 | (Japan) Mitsuhiro Aoki | (Japan) Fumika Nakamura | (Japan) Mitsuhiro Aoki | Mitsubishi Lancer Evo VI | —N/a |
| 71 | (New Zealand) Tony Burrowes | (New Zealand) Brendan Olsen | (New Zealand) Burrst Racing | Subaru Impreza WRX | —N/a |
| 72 | (New Zealand) David Langford-Smith | (New Zealand) Stuart Roberts | (New Zealand) David Langford-Smith | Subaru Impreza WRX | —N/a |
| 73 | (Japan) Keiji Seita | (Japan) Hiromi Ueno | (Japan) Keiji Seita | Honda Civic VTi | —N/a |

=== Itinerary ===
All dates and times are NZST (UTC+12).

| Date | Time | No. | Stage name | Distance |
|---|---|---|---|---|
Leg 1 — 117.17 km
| 21 September | 08:33 | SS1 | Te Akau North | 32.37 km |
| 21 September | 10:41 | SS2 | Maungatawhiri | 6.52 km |
| 21 September | 11:04 | SS3 | Te Papatapu 1 | 16.62 km |
| 21 September | 11:37 | SS4 | Te Hutewai | 11.32 km |
| 21 September | 13:08 | SS5 | Whaanga Coast | 29.52 km |
| 21 September | 13:51 | SS6 | Te Papatapu 2 | 16.62 km |
| 21 September | 18:30 | SS7 | Manukau Super 1 | 2.10 km |
| 21 September | 19:00 | SS8 | Manukau Super 2 | 2.10 km |
Leg 2 — 176.29 km
| 22 September | 09:53 | SS9 | Parahi — Ararua | 59.00 km |
| 22 September | 12:51 | SS10 | Batley | 19.82 km |
| 22 September | 13:24 | SS11 | Waipu Gorge | 11.24 km |
| 22 September | 13:42 | SS12 | Brooks | 16.03 km |
| 22 September | 14:10 | SS13 | Paparoa Station | 11.64 km |
| 22 September | 15:50 | SS14 | Cassidy | 21.64 km |
| 22 September | 16:33 | SS15 | Mititai | 26.77 km |
| 22 September | 17:16 | SS16 | Tokatoka | 10.15 km |
Leg 3 — 89.00 km
| 23 September | 08:38 | SS17 | Otorohea Trig | 4.62 km |
| 23 September | 09:06 | SS18 | Te Akau South | 31.24 km |
| 23 September | 11:14 | SS19 | Ridge 1 | 8.53 km |
| 23 September | 11:27 | SS20 | Campbell 1 | 7.44 km |
| 23 September | 11:45 | SS21 | Ridge 2 | 8.53 km |
| 23 September | 11:58 | SS22 | Campbell 2 | 7.44 km |
| 23 September | 12:41 | SS23 | Fyfe 1 | 10.60 km |
| 23 September | 13:04 | SS24 | Fyfe 2 | 10.60 km |

== Results ==
=== Overall ===
| Pos. | No. | Driver | Co-driver | Team | Car | Time | Difference | Points |
|---|---|---|---|---|---|---|---|---|
| 1 | 5 | (United Kingdom) Richard Burns | (United Kingdom) Robert Reid | (Japan) Subaru World Rally Team | Subaru Impreza S7 WRC '01 | 3:47:28.0 | | 10 |
| 2 | 4 | (United Kingdom) Colin McRae | (United Kingdom) Nicky Grist | (United Kingdom) Ford Motor Co. Ltd. | Ford Focus RS WRC '01 | 3:48:12.6 | +44.6 | 6 |
| 3 | 16 | (Finland) Harri Rovanperä | (Finland) Risto Pietiläinen | (France) Peugeot Total | Peugeot 206 WRC | 3:48:18.1 | +50.1 | 4 |
| 4 | 3 | (Spain) Carlos Sainz | (Spain) Luis Moya | (United Kingdom) Ford Motor Co. Ltd. | Ford Focus RS WRC '01 | 3:48:20.2 | +52.2 | 3 |
| 5 | 1 | (Finland) Marcus Grönholm | (Finland) Timo Rautiainen | (France) Peugeot Total | Peugeot 206 WRC | 3:48:23.8 | +55.8 | 2 |
| 6 | 2 | (France) Didier Auriol | (France) Denis Giraudet | (France) Peugeot Total | Peugeot 206 WRC | 3:48:39.3 | +1:11.3 | 1 |

=== World Rally Cars ===
==== Classification ====
| Position | | No. | Driver | Co-driver | Entrant | Car | Time | Difference | Points |
| Event | Class | No. | Driver | Co-driver | Entrant | Car | Time | Difference | Points |
|---|---|---|---|---|---|---|---|---|---|
| 1 | 1 | 5 | (United Kingdom) Richard Burns | (United Kingdom) Robert Reid | (Japan) Subaru World Rally Team | Subaru Impreza S7 WRC '01 | 3:47:28.0 | | 10 |
| 2 | 2 | 4 | (United Kingdom) Colin McRae | (United Kingdom) Nicky Grist | (United Kingdom) Ford Motor Co. Ltd. | Ford Focus RS WRC '01 | 3:48:12.6 | +44.6 | 6 |
| 4 | 3 | 3 | (Spain) Carlos Sainz | (Spain) Luis Moya | (United Kingdom) Ford Motor Co. Ltd. | Ford Focus RS WRC '01 | 3:48:20.2 | +52.2 | 3 |
| 5 | 4 | 1 | (Finland) Marcus Grönholm | (Finland) Timo Rautiainen | (France) Peugeot Total | Peugeot 206 WRC | 3:48:23.8 | +55.8 | 2 |
| 6 | 5 | 2 | (France) Didier Auriol | (France) Denis Giraudet | (France) Peugeot Total | Peugeot 206 WRC | 3:48:39.3 | +1:11.3 | 1 |
| 7 | 6 | 6 | (Norway) Petter Solberg | (United Kingdom) Phil Mills | (Japan) Subaru World Rally Team | Subaru Impreza S7 WRC '01 | 3:49:43.8 | +2:15.8 | 0 |
| 8 | 7 | 7 | (Finland) Tommi Mäkinen | (Finland) Risto Mannisenmäki | (Japan) Marlboro Mitsubishi Ralliart | Mitsubishi Lancer Evo 6.5 | 3:49:49.0 | +2:21.0 | 0 |
| 9 | 8 | 10 | (United Kingdom) Alister McRae | (United Kingdom) David Senior | (South Korea) Hyundai Castrol World Rally Team | Hyundai Accent WRC2 | 3:51:01.8 | +3:33.8 | 0 |
| 10 | 9 | 9 | (Sweden) Kenneth Eriksson | (Sweden) Staffan Parmander | (South Korea) Hyundai Castrol World Rally Team | Hyundai Accent WRC2 | 3:51:49.9 | +4:21.9 | 0 |
| 15 | 10 | 19 | (Finland) Toni Gardemeister | (Finland) Paavo Lukander | (Japan) Marlboro Mitsubishi Ralliart | Mitsubishi Carisma GT Evo VI | 3:56:04.3 | +8:36.3 | 0 |

==== Special stages ====
| Day | Stage | Stage name | Length | Winner | Car | Time | Class leaders |
|---|---|---|---|---|---|---|---|
| Leg 1 (21 Sep) | SS1 | Te Akau North | 32.37 km | (Finland) Marcus Grönholm | Peugeot 206 WRC | 18:04.6 | (Finland) Marcus Grönholm |
| Leg 1 (21 Sep) | SS2 | Maungatawhiri | 6.52 km | (Norway) Petter Solberg | Subaru Impreza S7 WRC '01 | 3:39.8 | (Finland) Marcus Grönholm |
| Leg 1 (21 Sep) | SS3 | Te Papatapu 1 | 16.62 km | (Norway) Petter Solberg | Subaru Impreza S7 WRC '01 | 11:00.2 | (Finland) Marcus Grönholm |
| Leg 1 (21 Sep) | SS4 | Te Hutewai | 11.32 km | (Finland) Marcus Grönholm | Peugeot 206 WRC | 8:03.7 | (Finland) Marcus Grönholm |
| Leg 1 (21 Sep) | SS5 | Whaanga Coast | 29.52 km | (France) Didier Auriol (Sweden) Kenneth Eriksson | Peugeot 206 WRC; Hyundai Accent WRC2 | 21:28.2 | (Finland) Marcus Grönholm |
| Leg 1 (21 Sep) | SS6 | Te Papatapu 2 | 16.62 km | (United Kingdom) Colin McRae | Ford Focus RS WRC '01 | 10:49.1 | (Sweden) Kenneth Eriksson |
| Leg 1 (21 Sep) | SS7 | Manukau Super 1 | 2.10 km | (Spain) Carlos Sainz | Ford Focus RS WRC '01 | 1:21.6 | (Sweden) Kenneth Eriksson |
| Leg 1 (21 Sep) | SS8 | Manukau Super 2 | 2.10 km | (Spain) Carlos Sainz | Ford Focus RS WRC '01 | 1:20.1 | (Sweden) Kenneth Eriksson |
| Leg 2 (22 Sep) | SS9 | Parahi — Ararua | 59.00 km | (Finland) Harri Rovanperä | Peugeot 206 WRC | 33:59.9 | (United Kingdom) Richard Burns |
| Leg 2 (22 Sep) | SS10 | Batley | 19.82 km | (United Kingdom) Richard Burns | Subaru Impreza S7 WRC '01 | 10:55.9 | (United Kingdom) Richard Burns |
| Leg 2 (22 Sep) | SS11 | Waipu Gorge | 11.24 km | (United Kingdom) Richard Burns | Subaru Impreza S7 WRC '01 | 6:31.2 | (United Kingdom) Richard Burns |
| Leg 2 (22 Sep) | SS12 | Brooks | 16.03 km | (United Kingdom) Richard Burns | Subaru Impreza S7 WRC '01 | 9:44.6 | (United Kingdom) Richard Burns |
| Leg 2 (22 Sep) | SS13 | Paparoa Station | 11.64 km | (United Kingdom) Richard Burns | Subaru Impreza S7 WRC '01 | 6:17.9 | (United Kingdom) Richard Burns |
| Leg 2 (22 Sep) | SS14 | Cassidy | 21.64 km | (France) Didier Auriol | Peugeot 206 WRC | 12:23.9 | (United Kingdom) Richard Burns |
| Leg 2 (22 Sep) | SS15 | Mititai | 26.77 km | (United Kingdom) Richard Burns | Subaru Impreza S7 WRC '01 | 13:42.3 | (United Kingdom) Richard Burns |
| Leg 2 (22 Sep) | SS16 | Tokatoka | 10.15 km | (United Kingdom) Richard Burns | Subaru Impreza S7 WRC '01 | 5:19.3 | (United Kingdom) Richard Burns |
| Leg 3 (23 Sep) | SS17 | Otorohea Trig | 4.62 km | (Finland) Marcus Grönholm | Peugeot 206 WRC | 3:06.0 | (United Kingdom) Richard Burns |
| Leg 3 (23 Sep) | SS18 | Te Akau South | 31.24 km | (Spain) Carlos Sainz | Ford Focus RS WRC '01 | 18:45.0 | (United Kingdom) Richard Burns |
| Leg 3 (23 Sep) | SS19 | Ridge 1 | 8.53 km | (Finland) Marcus Grönholm | Peugeot 206 WRC | 4:47.1 | (United Kingdom) Richard Burns |
| Leg 3 (23 Sep) | SS20 | Campbell 1 | 7.44 km | (Norway) Petter Solberg | Subaru Impreza S7 WRC '01 | 3:55.7 | (United Kingdom) Richard Burns |
| Leg 3 (23 Sep) | SS21 | Ridge 2 | 8.53 km | (Finland) Marcus Grönholm | Peugeot 206 WRC | 4:41.4 | (United Kingdom) Richard Burns |
| Leg 3 (23 Sep) | SS22 | Campbell 2 | 7.44 km | (Norway) Petter Solberg | Subaru Impreza S7 WRC '01 | 3:50.9 | (United Kingdom) Richard Burns |
| Leg 3 (23 Sep) | SS23 | Fyfe 1 | 10.60 km | (Norway) Petter Solberg | Subaru Impreza S7 WRC '01 | 5:42.6 | (United Kingdom) Richard Burns |
| Leg 3 (23 Sep) | SS24 | Fyfe 2 | 10.60 km | (Norway) Petter Solberg | Subaru Impreza S7 WRC '01 | 5:32.6 | (United Kingdom) Richard Burns |

==== Championship standings ====
| Pos. | Drivers' championships | | | Co-drivers' championships | | | Manufacturers' championships | | |
| Pos. | Move | Driver | Points | Move | Co-driver | Points | Move | Manufacturer | Points |
|---|---|---|---|---|---|---|---|---|---|
| 1 | 1 | (United Kingdom) Colin McRae | 40 | 1 | (United Kingdom) Nicky Grist | 40 | 1 | (United Kingdom) Ford Motor Co. Ltd. | 76 |
| 2 | 1 | (Finland) Tommi Mäkinen | 40 | 1 | (Finland) Risto Mannisenmäki | 40 | 1 | (Japan) Marlboro Mitsubishi Ralliart | 66 |
| 3 | 2 | (United Kingdom) Richard Burns | 31 | 2 | (United Kingdom) Robert Reid | 31 | 1 | (Japan) Subaru World Rally Team | 46 |
| 4 | 1 | (Spain) Carlos Sainz | 30 | 1 | (Spain) Luis Moya | 30 | 1 | (France) Peugeot Total | 44 |
| 5 | 1 | (Finland) Harri Rovanperä | 27 | 1 | (Finland) Risto Pietiläinen | 27 | | (Czech Republic) Škoda Motorsport | 15 |

=== FIA Cup for Production Rally Drivers ===
==== Classification ====
| Position | | No. | Driver | Co-driver | Entrant | Car | Time | Difference | Points |
| Event | Class | No. | Driver | Co-driver | Entrant | Car | Time | Difference | Points |
|---|---|---|---|---|---|---|---|---|---|
| 16 | 1 | 22 | (Austria) Manfred Stohl | (Austria) Peter Müller | (Austria) Manfred Stohl | Mitsubishi Lancer Evo VI | 3:58:33.1 | | 10 |
| 18 | 2 | 23 | (Argentina) Gabriel Pozzo | (Argentina) Daniel Stillo | (Argentina) Gabriel Pozzo | Mitsubishi Lancer Evo VI | 4:01:24.5 | +2:51.4 | 6 |
| 20 | 3 | 29 | (Japan) Fumio Nutahara | (Japan) Satoshi Hayashi | (Japan) Advan-Piaa Rally Team | Mitsubishi Lancer Evo VII | 4:03:22.2 | +4:49.1 | 4 |
| 21 | 4 | 26 | (Sweden) Stig Blomqvist | (Venezuela) Ana Goñi | (United Kingdom) David Sutton Cars Ltd | Mitsubishi Lancer Evo VI | 4:03:42.2 | +5:09.1 | 3 |
| 24 | 5 | 43 | (New Zealand) Kevin Holmes | (New Zealand) Garry Cowan | Ralliart New Zealand | Mitsubishi Lancer Evo VI | 4:04:29.9 | +5:56.8 | 2 |
| 25 | 6 | 28 | (New Zealand) Reece Jones | (New Zealand) Leo Bult | (New Zealand) Reece Jones | Mitsubishi Lancer Evo VI | 4:05:37.8 | +7:04.7 | 1 |
| 26 | 7 | 40 | (New Zealand) Ross Meekings | (New Zealand) Alan Glen | Ralliart New Zealand | Mitsubishi Lancer Evo VI | 4:07:17.4 | +8:44.3 | 0 |
| 27 | 8 | 37 | (Italy) Luca Baldini | (Italy) Massimo Agostinelli | (Italy) Luca Baldini | Mitsubishi Lancer Evo VI | 4:12:05.2 | +13:32.1 | 0 |
| 31 | 9 | 50 | (New Zealand) Mike Turfus | (New Zealand) Fleur Pedersen | (United Kingdom) Silverstone Rally Tyre Team | Mitsubishi Lancer Evo VI | 4:14:12.1 | +15:39.0 | 0 |
| 32 | 10 | 49 | (New Zealand) Cameron Bates | (New Zealand) Laurie Brenssell | (New Zealand) Cameron Bates | Subaru Impreza STI | 4:16:09.3 | +17:36.2 | 0 |
| 34 | 11 | 64 | (Japan) Hiromichi Niwa | (Japan) Tadayoshi Sato | (Japan) Hiromichi Niwa | Mitsubishi Lancer Evo VI | 4:18:55.2 | +20:22.1 | 0 |
| 36 | 12 | 41 | (United Kingdom) Natalie Barratt | (New Zealand) Chris Patterson | (United Kingdom) Natalie Barratt Rallysport | Mitsubishi Lancer Evo VI | 4:21:26.1 | +22:53.0 | 0 |
| 38 | 13 | 68 | (Japan) Minoru Shinomiya | (Japan) Yoshinari Kawanishi | (Japan) Minoru Shinomiya | Mitsubishi Lancer Evo VI | 4:26:56.9 | +28:23.8 | 0 |
| 40 | 14 | 71 | (New Zealand) Tony Burrowes | (New Zealand) Brendan Olsen | (New Zealand) Burrst Racing | Subaru Impreza WRX | 4:34:18.5 | +35:45.4 | 0 |
| 45 | 15 | 58 | (New Zealand) Deborah Kibble | (New Zealand) Jamie Kibble | (New Zealand) Deborah Kibble | Mitsubishi Lancer Evo VI | 4:39:20.0 | +40:46.9 | 0 |
| 48 | 16 | 51 | (United Kingdom) Graeme Presswell | (United Kingdom) Martin Saunders | (New Zealand) Rally Drive NZ | Mitsubishi Lancer Evo III | 4:53:34.5 | +55:01.4 | 0 |
| Retired SS22 | | 39 | (New Zealand) Chris West | (New Zealand) Chris Cobham | (New Zealand) Rose City Cars | Subaru Impreza WRX STI | Transmission | | 0 |
| Retired SS20 | | 55 | (New Zealand) Jeff Judd | (New Zealand) Grant Marra | (New Zealand) Jeff Judd | Subaru Impreza WRX | Engine | | 0 |
| Retired SS18 | | 72 | (New Zealand) David Langford-Smith | (New Zealand) Stuart Roberts | (New Zealand) David Langford-Smith | Subaru Impreza WRX | Engine | | 0 |
| Retired SS16 | | 27 | (Australia) Cody Crocker | (Australia) Greg Foletta | Subaru Rally Team Australia | Subaru Impreza STI N8 | Accident | | 0 |
| Retired SS15 | | 70 | (Japan) Mitsuhiro Aoki | (Japan) Fumika Nakamura | (Japan) Mitsuhiro Aoki | Mitsubishi Lancer Evo VI | Accident | | 0 |
| Retired SS9 | | 73 | (Japan) Keiji Seita | (Japan) Hiromi Ueno | (Japan) Keiji Seita | Honda Civic VTi | Accident | | 0 |
| Retired SS5 | | 25 | (Argentina) Marcos Ligato | (Argentina) Rubén García | (Argentina) Marcos Ligato | Mitsubishi Lancer Evo VI | Accident | | 0 |
| Retired SS5 | | 30 | (Italy) Giovanni Manfrinato | (Italy) Claudio Condotta | (Italy) Giovanni Manfrinato | Mitsubishi Lancer Evo VI | Mechanical | | 0 |
| Retired SS4 | | 66 | (Japan) Nobuaki Takahashi | (Japan) Masako Takahashi | (Japan) Nobuaki Takahashi | Mitsubishi Lancer Evo V | Suspension | | 0 |

==== Special stages ====
| Day | Stage | Stage name | Length | Winner | Car | Time | Class leaders |
|---|---|---|---|---|---|---|---|
| Leg 1 (21 Sep) | SS1 | Te Akau North | 32.37 km | (Austria) Manfred Stohl | Mitsubishi Lancer Evo VI | 18:51.5 | (Austria) Manfred Stohl |
| Leg 1 (21 Sep) | SS2 | Maungatawhiri | 6.52 km | (Austria) Manfred Stohl | Mitsubishi Lancer Evo VI | 3:51.6 | (Austria) Manfred Stohl |
| Leg 1 (21 Sep) | SS3 | Te Papatapu 1 | 16.62 km | (Austria) Manfred Stohl | Mitsubishi Lancer Evo VI | 11:25.1 | (Austria) Manfred Stohl |
| Leg 1 (21 Sep) | SS4 | Te Hutewai | 11.32 km | (Australia) Cody Crocker | Subaru Impreza STI N8 | 8:21.8 | (Argentina) Gabriel Pozzo |
| Leg 1 (21 Sep) | SS5 | Whaanga Coast | 29.52 km | (Australia) Cody Crocker | Subaru Impreza STI N8 | 22:01.0 | (Australia) Cody Crocker |
| Leg 1 (21 Sep) | SS6 | Te Papatapu 2 | 16.62 km | (Australia) Cody Crocker | Subaru Impreza STI N8 | 11:14.6 | (Australia) Cody Crocker |
| Leg 1 (21 Sep) | SS7 | Manukau Super 1 | 2.10 km | (Austria) Manfred Stohl (New Zealand) Ross Meekings | Mitsubishi Lancer Evo VI; Mitsubishi Lancer Evo VI | 1:27.7 | (Australia) Cody Crocker |
| Leg 1 (21 Sep) | SS8 | Manukau Super 2 | 2.10 km | (Austria) Manfred Stohl | Mitsubishi Lancer Evo VI | 1:26.2 | (Australia) Cody Crocker |
| Leg 2 (22 Sep) | SS9 | Parahi — Ararua | 59.00 km | (Austria) Manfred Stohl | Mitsubishi Lancer Evo VI | 35:48.0 | (Austria) Manfred Stohl |
| Leg 2 (22 Sep) | SS10 | Batley | 19.82 km | (Austria) Manfred Stohl | Mitsubishi Lancer Evo VI | 11:32.4 | (Austria) Manfred Stohl |
| Leg 2 (22 Sep) | SS11 | Waipu Gorge | 11.24 km | (Austria) Manfred Stohl | Mitsubishi Lancer Evo VI | 6:49.9 | (Austria) Manfred Stohl |
| Leg 2 (22 Sep) | SS12 | Brooks | 16.03 km | (Austria) Manfred Stohl | Mitsubishi Lancer Evo VI | 10:15.7 | (Austria) Manfred Stohl |
| Leg 2 (22 Sep) | SS13 | Paparoa Station | 11.64 km | (Austria) Manfred Stohl (Australia) Cody Crocker | Mitsubishi Lancer Evo VI; Subaru Impreza STI N8 | 6:38.0 | (Austria) Manfred Stohl |
| Leg 2 (22 Sep) | SS14 | Cassidy | 21.64 km | (Austria) Manfred Stohl | Mitsubishi Lancer Evo VI | 13:15.4 | (Austria) Manfred Stohl |
| Leg 2 (22 Sep) | SS15 | Mititai | 26.77 km | (Austria) Manfred Stohl | Mitsubishi Lancer Evo VI | 14:39.5 | (Austria) Manfred Stohl |
| Leg 2 (22 Sep) | SS16 | Tokatoka | 10.15 km | (Austria) Manfred Stohl | Mitsubishi Lancer Evo VI | 5:42.9 | (Austria) Manfred Stohl |
| Leg 3 (23 Sep) | SS17 | Otorohea Trig | 4.62 km | (Japan) Fumio Nutahara | Mitsubishi Lancer Evo VII | 3:16.9 | (Austria) Manfred Stohl |
| Leg 3 (23 Sep) | SS18 | Te Akau South | 31.24 km | (Austria) Manfred Stohl | Mitsubishi Lancer Evo VI | 19:45.6 | (Austria) Manfred Stohl |
| Leg 3 (23 Sep) | SS19 | Ridge 1 | 8.53 km | (New Zealand) Kevin Holmes | Mitsubishi Lancer Evo VI | 5:06.6 | (Austria) Manfred Stohl |
| Leg 3 (23 Sep) | SS20 | Campbell 1 | 7.44 km | (New Zealand) Ross Meekings | Mitsubishi Lancer Evo VI | 4:13.2 | (Austria) Manfred Stohl |
| Leg 3 (23 Sep) | SS21 | Ridge 2 | 8.53 km | (New Zealand) Ross Meekings | Mitsubishi Lancer Evo VI | 5:05.3 | (Austria) Manfred Stohl |
| Leg 3 (23 Sep) | SS22 | Campbell 2 | 7.44 km | (New Zealand) Ross Meekings | Mitsubishi Lancer Evo VI | 4:15.3 | (Austria) Manfred Stohl |
| Leg 3 (23 Sep) | SS23 | Fyfe 1 | 10.60 km | (New Zealand) Ross Meekings | Mitsubishi Lancer Evo VI | 6:03.2 | (Austria) Manfred Stohl |
| Leg 3 (23 Sep) | SS24 | Fyfe 2 | 10.60 km | (Japan) Fumio Nutahara | Mitsubishi Lancer Evo VII | 6:05.6 | (Austria) Manfred Stohl |

==== Championship standings ====
| Pos. | Drivers' championships | | |
| Pos. | Move | Driver | Points |
|---|---|---|---|
| 1 | | (Argentina) Gabriel Pozzo | 59 |
| 2 | | (Uruguay) Gustavo Trelles | 26 |
| 3 | 1 | (Austria) Manfred Stohl | 22 |
| 4 | 1 | (Argentina) Marcos Ligato | 22 |
| 5 | 3 | (Sweden) Stig Blomqvist | 11 |
