= 2006 Asia-Pacific Rally Championship =

2006 Asia-Pacific Rally season

Seasons
- ← 2005 2007 →

The 2006 Asia-Pacific Rally Championship season (APRC) was an international rally championship organized by the FIA. The champion was Australian driver Cody Crocker.

== Calendar ==
| Round | Date | Event | Winner |
|---|---|---|---|
| 1 | March 10–12 | (Australia) Rally of Canberra | (Australia) Cody Crocker |
| 2 | April 14–16 | (France) Rallye de Nouvelle Calédonie | (Japan) Katsu Taguchi |
| 3 | May 26–28 | (New Zealand) Rally of Whangarei | (Australia) Cody Crocker |
| 4 | June 7–9 | (Japan) Rally Hokkaido | (Australia) Cody Crocker |
| 5 | August 18–20 | (Malaysia) Malaysian Rally | (Australia) Cody Crocker |
| 6 | September 15–17 | Rally Indonesia | (Australia) Cody Crocker |
| 7 | November 25–27 | China Rally | (Australia) Cody Crocker |

== Points ==
| Position | Driver | Points |
|---|---|---|
| 1 | (Australia) Cody Crocker | 94 |
| 2 | (Japan) Hiroshi Yanagisawa | 45 |
| 3 | (Japan) Katsu Taguchi | 44 |
| 4 | (Indonesia) Rifat Sungkar | 38 |
| 5 | (Finland) Jarkko Miettinen | 31 |
| 6 | (Australia) Eli Evans | 20 |
| 7 | (New Zealand) Dermott Malley | 14 |
| = | (Indonesia) Subhan Aksa | 14 |
| 9 | (China) Fan Fan | 12 |
| 10 | (New Zealand) Brian Green | 8 |
| 11 | (New Zealand) Mark Tapper | 1 |
