= 2000 Rally New Zealand =

8th round of the 2000 World Rally Championship

2000 Rally New Zealand 31st Propecia Rally New Zealand
Round 8 of the 2000 World Rally Championship season
← Previous event	Next event →
- Host country: New Zealand
- Rally base: Auckland
- Dates run: July 14 2000 – July 16 2000
- Stages: 24 (373.11 km; 231.84 miles)
- Stage surface: Gravel
- Overall distance: 1,619.76 km (1,006.47 miles)

Statistics
- Crews: 70 at start, 43 at finish

Overall results
- Overall winner: (Finland) Marcus Grönholm (Finland) Timo Rautiainen (France) Peugeot Esso; Peugeot 206 WRC

The 2000 Rally New Zealand (formally the 31st Propecia Rally New Zealand) was the eighth round of the 2000 World Rally Championship. The race was held over three days between 14 July and 16 July 2000, and was won by Peugeot's Marcus Grönholm, his 2nd win in the World Rally Championship.

== Background ==
=== Entry list ===
No.	Driver	Co-Driver	Entrant	Car	Tyre
World Rally Championship manufacturer entries
1	(Finland) Tommi Mäkinen	(Finland) Risto Mannisenmäki	(Japan) Marlboro Mitsubishi Ralliart	Mitsubishi Lancer Evo VI	MI
2	(Belgium) Freddy Loix	(Belgium) Sven Smeets	(Japan) Marlboro Mitsubishi Ralliart	Mitsubishi Carisma GT Evo VI	MI
3	(United Kingdom) Richard Burns	(United Kingdom) Robert Reid	(Japan) Subaru World Rally Team	Subaru Impreza S6 WRC '00	P
4	(Finland) Juha Kankkunen	(Finland) Juha Repo	(Japan) Subaru World Rally Team	Subaru Impreza S6 WRC '00	P
5	(United Kingdom) Colin McRae	(United Kingdom) Nicky Grist	(United Kingdom) Ford Motor Co. Ltd.	Ford Focus RS WRC '00	MI
6	(Spain) Carlos Sainz	(Spain) Luis Moya	(United Kingdom) Ford Motor Co. Ltd.	Ford Focus RS WRC '00	MI
7	(France) Didier Auriol	(France) Denis Giraudet	(Spain) SEAT Sport	SEAT Córdoba WRC Evo2	P
8	(Finland) Toni Gardemeister	(Finland) Paavo Lukander	(Spain) SEAT Sport	SEAT Córdoba WRC Evo2	P
9	(France) François Delecour	(France) Daniel Grataloup	(France) Peugeot Esso	Peugeot 206 WRC	MI
10	(Finland) Marcus Grönholm	(Finland) Timo Rautiainen	(France) Peugeot Esso	Peugeot 206 WRC	MI
14	(Sweden) Kenneth Eriksson	(Sweden) Staffan Parmander	(South Korea) Hyundai Castrol World Rally Team	Hyundai Accent WRC	MI
15	(United Kingdom) Alister McRae	(United Kingdom) David Senior	(South Korea) Hyundai Castrol World Rally Team	Hyundai Accent WRC	MI
World Rally Championship entries
16	(Norway) Petter Solberg	(United Kingdom) Phil Mills	(United Kingdom) Ford Motor Co. Ltd.	Ford Focus RS WRC '00	MI
17	(New Zealand) Peter 'Possum' Bourne	(New Zealand) Craig Vincent	Subaru Rally Team Australia	Subaru Impreza S5 WRC '98	—N/a
18	(Japan) Toshihiro Arai	(United Kingdom) Roger Freeman	(Japan) Spike Subaru Team	Subaru Impreza S5 WRC '99	—N/a
23	(Greece) Ioannis Papadimitriou	(Greece) Nikolaos Petropoulos	(Greece) Ioannis Papadimitriou	Subaru Impreza 555	MI
28	(New Zealand) Geoff Argyle	(New Zealand) Paul Fallon	Mitsubishi Ralliart New Zealand	Mitsubishi Lancer Evo VII	—N/a
29	(New Zealand) Bruce Herbert	(New Zealand) Robert Ryan	(New Zealand) Rose City Cars	Mitsubishi Lancer Evo VI	—N/a
30	(New Zealand) Joe McAndrew	(New Zealand) Christopher Boyle	(New Zealand) Joe McAndrew	Subaru Impreza WRX	—N/a
31	(New Zealand) Todd Bawden	(New Zealand) Raymond Bennett	(New Zealand) Todd Bawden	Mitsubishi Lancer Evo VI	—N/a
34	(New Zealand) Andrew Hawkeswood	(New Zealand) Samantha Haldane	Mitsubishi Ralliart New Zealand	Mitsubishi Lancer Evo VI	—N/a
37	(New Zealand) Brian Green	(New Zealand) Jane McKay	(New Zealand) Palmerston North Motors	Mitsubishi Lancer Evo VI	—N/a
42	(New Zealand) Lewis Scott	(New Zealand) Jane Black	(New Zealand) Lewis Scott	Mitsubishi Lancer Evo IV	—N/a
43	(New Zealand) Brian Stokes	(New Zealand) Shayne O'Hagan	(New Zealand) Brian Stokes	Ford Escort RS Cosworth	—N/a
44	(New Zealand) Chris Haldane	(New Zealand) Trevor Jones	(New Zealand) Chris Haldane	Mitsubishi Lancer Evo VI	—N/a
46	(New Zealand) John Silcock	(New Zealand) Andrew Silcock	(New Zealand) John Silcock	Mazda 323 GT-R	—N/a
47	(New Zealand) Barry Sexton	(New Zealand) Chris Cobham	(New Zealand) Barry Sexton	Subaru Impreza WRX	—N/a
49	(New Zealand) Cameron Bates	(New Zealand) Laurie Brenssell	(New Zealand) Cameron Bates	Subaru Impreza WRX	—N/a
50	(New Zealand) Gwynn Gilmour	(New Zealand) Emma Gilmour	(New Zealand) Gwynn Gilmour	Mitsubishi Lancer Evo III	—N/a
51	(New Zealand) Malcolm Stewart	(New Zealand) Mike Fletcher	(New Zealand) Malcolm Stewart	Mitsubishi Lancer Evo IV	—N/a
52	(United Kingdom) John Lloyd	(United Kingdom) Pauline Gullick	(United Kingdom) John Lloyd	Mitsubishi Lancer Evo V	—N/a
53	(New Zealand) Ian Easton	(New Zealand) Cheryl Easton	(New Zealand) Ian Easton	Mitsubishi Lancer Evo V	—N/a
53	(New Zealand) Kerry Evans	(New Zealand) Bruce McKenzie	(New Zealand) Kerry Evans	Subaru Impreza WRX	—N/a
54	(New Zealand) Mark Hiestand	(New Zealand) Stephen Fargher	(New Zealand) Winger Subaru	Nissan Pulsar GTI-R	—N/a
59	(New Zealand) Stephen Pilcher	(Netherlands) John van der Velden	(New Zealand) Stephen Pilcher	Mitsubishi Lancer Evo V	—N/a
Group N Cup entries
20	(Uruguay) Gustavo Trelles	(Argentina) Jorge Del Buono	(Uruguay) Gustavo Trelles	Mitsubishi Lancer Evo VI	—N/a
21	(Austria) Manfred Stohl	(Austria) Peter Müller	(Austria) Manfred Stohl	Mitsubishi Lancer Evo VI	P
22	(Oman) Hamed Al-Wahaibi	(New Zealand) Tony Sircombe	(Oman) Arab World Rally Team	Subaru Impreza WRX	—N/a
26	(Uruguay) Gabriel Mendez	(Uruguay) Daniel Muzio	(Uruguay) Gabriel Mendez	Mitsubishi Lancer Evo VI	—N/a
27	(Japan) Fumio Nutahara	(Japan) Satoshi Hayashi	(Japan) Advan-Piaa Rally Team	Mitsubishi Lancer Evo VI	—N/a
32	(New Zealand) Ross Meekings	(New Zealand) Alan Glen	Mitsubishi Ralliart New Zealand	Mitsubishi Lancer Evo III	—N/a
33	(Australia) Cody Crocker	(Australia) Greg Foletta	Subaru Rally Team Australia	Subaru Impreza WRX	—N/a
35	(Malaysia) Karamjit Singh	(Malaysia) Allen Oh	(Malaysia) Petronas EON Racing Team	Proton Pert	—N/a
36	(New Zealand) Chris West	(New Zealand) Garry Cowan	Mitsubishi Ralliart New Zealand	Mitsubishi Lancer Evo VI	—N/a
38	(New Zealand) Reece Jones	(New Zealand) Leo Bult	(New Zealand) Reece Jones	Mitsubishi Lancer Evo VI	—N/a
39	(Italy) Domenico Caldarola	(Italy) Paolo Cecchini	(Italy) Domenico Caldarola	Mitsubishi Lancer Evo VI	—N/a
40	(New Zealand) Kevin Holmes	(New Zealand) Glenn Macneall	(New Zealand) Kevin Holmes	Subaru Impreza WRX	—N/a
41	(France) Jean-Louis Leyraud	(New Zealand) Rob Scott	(France) Jean-Louis Leyraud	Subaru Impreza WRX	—N/a
45	(New Zealand) Karl Robinson	(New Zealand) Tony Aimers	(New Zealand) Karl Robinson	Subaru Impreza 555	—N/a
48	(New Zealand) Glenn Smith	(New Zealand) Dean Stockwell	(New Zealand) Glenn Smith	Mitsubishi Lancer Evo V	—N/a
56	(United Kingdom) Julian Reynolds	(United Kingdom) Andrew Bull	(United Kingdom) Julian Reynolds	Mitsubishi Lancer Evo V	—N/a
60	(New Zealand) Geoff Newton	(New Zealand) Fleur Pedersen	(New Zealand) Geoff Newton	Mitsubishi Lancer Evo VI	—N/a
61	(Germany) Michael Kahlfuss	(Germany) Ronald Bauer	(Germany) Michael Kahlfuss	Toyota Celica GT-Four	—N/a
62	(New Zealand) Deborah Kibble	(New Zealand) Jamie Kibble	(New Zealand) Deborah Kibble	Mitsubishi Lancer Evo VI	—N/a
64	(New Zealand) Merv Hatcher	(New Zealand) James Cowles	(New Zealand) Merv Hatcher	Subaru Impreza WRX	—N/a
68	(United Kingdom) Bruce Warburton	(Netherlands) Harmannus Slebos	(United Kingdom) Bruce Warburton	Subaru Impreza WRX	—N/a
69	(Hong Kong) Fui On Sing	(Hong Kong) Shui Sang Lau	(Hong Kong) Fui On Sing	Mitsubishi Lancer Evo VI	—N/a
70	(Hong Kong) Tommy Chan	(Hong Kong) Chi Ping Chan	(Hong Kong) Tommy Chan	Mitsubishi Lancer Evo V	—N/a
71	(Japan) Kimihide Terao	(Japan) Akihito Tokunou	(Japan) Kimihide Terao	Mitsubishi Lancer Evo III	—N/a
72	(Japan) Nobuaki Takahashi	(Japan) Masako Takahashi	(Japan) Nobuaki Takahashi	Mitsubishi Lancer Evo V	—N/a

=== Itinerary ===
All dates and times are NZST (UTC+12).

Date	Time	No.	Stage name	Distance
Leg 1 — 117.17 km
14 July	08:23	SS1	Te Akau North	32.37 km
14 July	10:26	SS2	Maungatawhiri	6.52 km
14 July	10:49	SS3	Te Papatapu 1	16.62 km
14 July	11:22	SS4	Te Hutewai	11.32 km
14 July	12:53	SS5	Whaanga Coast	29.52 km
14 July	13:36	SS6	Te Papatapu 2	16.62 km
14 July	18:15	SS7	Manukau Super 1	2.10 km
14 July	18:45	SS8	Manukau Super 2	2.10 km
Leg 2 — 176.76 km
15 July	09:28	SS9	Waipu Gorge 1	11.24 km
15 July	09:46	SS10	Brooks 1	16.03 km
15 July	10:14	SS11	Paparoa Station 1	11.64 km
15 July	11:37	SS12	Parahi — Ararua	59.00 km
15 July	14:20	SS13	Cassidy	20.12 km
15 July	15:13	SS14	Batley	19.82 km
15 July	16:16	SS15	Waipu Gorge 2	11.24 km
15 July	16:34	SS16	Brooks 2	16.03 km
15 July	17:02	SS17	Paparoa Station 2	11.64 km
Leg 3 — 79.18 km
16 July	09:18	SS18	Te Akau South	31.24 km
16 July	11:26	SS19	Ridge 1	8.53 km
16 July	11:39	SS20	Campbell 1	7.44 km
16 July	11:57	SS21	Ridge 2	8.53 km
16 July	12:10	SS22	Campbell 2	7.44 km
16 July	12:53	SS23	Fyfe 1	8.00 km
16 July	13:06	SS24	Fyfe 2	8.00 km

== Results ==
=== Overall ===
Pos.	No.	Driver	Co-driver	Team	Car	Time	Difference	Points
1	10	(Finland) Marcus Grönholm	(Finland) Timo Rautiainen	(France) Peugeot Esso	Peugeot 206 WRC	3:45:13.4		10
2	5	(United Kingdom) Colin McRae	(United Kingdom) Nicky Grist	(United Kingdom) Ford Motor Co. Ltd.	Ford Focus RS WRC '00	3:45:27.9	+14.5	6
3	6	(Spain) Carlos Sainz	(Spain) Luis Moya	(United Kingdom) Ford Motor Co. Ltd.	Ford Focus RS WRC '00	3:46:31.8	+1:18.4	4
4	16	(Norway) Petter Solberg	(United Kingdom) Phil Mills	(United Kingdom) Ford Motor Co. Ltd.	Ford Focus RS WRC '00	3:48:14.1	+3:00.7	3
5	14	(Sweden) Kenneth Eriksson	(Sweden) Staffan Parmander	(South Korea) Hyundai Castrol World Rally Team	Hyundai Accent WRC	3:48:26.1	+3:12.7	2
6	17	(New Zealand) Peter 'Possum' Bourne	(New Zealand) Craig Vincent	Subaru Rally Team Australia	Subaru Impreza S5 WRC '98	3:52:08.0	+6:54.6	1

=== World Rally Cars ===
==== Classification ====
Position		No.	Driver	Co-driver	Entrant	Car	Time	Difference	Points
Event	Class	No.	Driver	Co-driver	Entrant	Car	Time	Difference	Points
1	1	10	(Finland) Marcus Grönholm	(Finland) Timo Rautiainen	(France) Peugeot Esso	Peugeot 206 WRC	3:45:13.4		10
2	2	5	(United Kingdom) Colin McRae	(United Kingdom) Nicky Grist	(United Kingdom) Ford Motor Co. Ltd.	Ford Focus RS WRC '00	3:45:27.9	+14.5	6
3	3	6	(Spain) Carlos Sainz	(Spain) Luis Moya	(United Kingdom) Ford Motor Co. Ltd.	Ford Focus RS WRC '00	3:46:31.8	+1:18.4	4
5	4	14	(Sweden) Kenneth Eriksson	(Sweden) Staffan Parmander	(South Korea) Hyundai Castrol World Rally Team	Hyundai Accent WRC	3:48:26.1	+3:12.7	2
Retired SS21		3	(United Kingdom) Richard Burns	(United Kingdom) Robert Reid	(Japan) Subaru World Rally Team	Subaru Impreza S6 WRC '00	Mechanical		0
Retired SS21		4	(Finland) Juha Kankkunen	(Finland) Juha Repo	(Japan) Subaru World Rally Team	Subaru Impreza S6 WRC '00	Mechanical		0
Retired SS19		1	(Finland) Tommi Mäkinen	(Finland) Risto Mannisenmäki	(Japan) Marlboro Mitsubishi Ralliart	Mitsubishi Lancer Evo VI	Accident		0
Retired SS19		15	(United Kingdom) Alister McRae	(United Kingdom) David Senior	(South Korea) Hyundai Castrol World Rally Team	Hyundai Accent WRC	Differential		0
Retired SS16		7	(France) Didier Auriol	(France) Denis Giraudet	(Spain) SEAT Sport	SEAT Córdoba WRC Evo2	Accident		0
Retired SS14		2	(Belgium) Freddy Loix	(Belgium) Sven Smeets	(Japan) Marlboro Mitsubishi Ralliart	Mitsubishi Carisma GT Evo VI	Mechanical		0
Retired SS11		9	(France) François Delecour	(France) Daniel Grataloup	(France) Peugeot Esso	Peugeot 206 WRC	Gearbox		0
Retired SS1		8	(Finland) Toni Gardemeister	(Finland) Paavo Lukander	(Spain) SEAT Sport	SEAT Córdoba WRC Evo2	Accident		0

==== Special stages ====
Day	Stage	Stage name	Length	Winner	Car	Time	Class leaders
Leg 1 (14 Jul)	SS1	Te Akau North	32.37 km	(France) François Delecour	Peugeot 206 WRC	18:08.1	(France) François Delecour
Leg 1 (14 Jul)	SS2	Maungatawhiri	6.52 km	(Norway) Petter Solberg	Ford Focus RS WRC '00	3:41.7	(France) François Delecour
Leg 1 (14 Jul)	SS3	Te Papatapu 1	16.62 km	(Finland) Marcus Grönholm	Peugeot 206 WRC	11:13.6	(France) François Delecour
Leg 1 (14 Jul)	SS4	Te Hutewai	11.32 km	(Norway) Petter Solberg	Ford Focus RS WRC '00	8:06.3	(France) François Delecour
Leg 1 (14 Jul)	SS5	Whaanga Coast	29.52 km	(France) François Delecour	Peugeot 206 WRC	21:23.7	(France) François Delecour
Leg 1 (14 Jul)	SS6	Te Papatapu 2	16.62 km	(France) François Delecour	Peugeot 206 WRC	11:04.2	(France) François Delecour
Leg 1 (14 Jul)	SS7	Manukau Super 1	2.10 km	(United Kingdom) Colin McRae	Ford Focus RS WRC '00	1:22.3	(France) François Delecour
Leg 1 (14 Jul)	SS8	Manukau Super 2	2.10 km	(United Kingdom) Colin McRae	Ford Focus RS WRC '00	1:20.5	(France) François Delecour
Leg 2 (15 Jul)	SS9	Waipu Gorge 1	11.24 km	(United Kingdom) Richard Burns	Subaru Impreza S6 WRC '00	6:32.8	(France) François Delecour
Leg 2 (15 Jul)	SS10	Brooks 1	16.03 km	(United Kingdom) Richard Burns	Subaru Impreza S6 WRC '00	9:49.9	(Finland) Marcus Grönholm
Leg 2 (15 Jul)	SS11	Paparoa Station 1	11.64 km	(United Kingdom) Richard Burns	Subaru Impreza S6 WRC '00	6:18.5	(Finland) Marcus Grönholm
Leg 2 (15 Jul)	SS12	Parahi — Ararua	59.00 km	(United Kingdom) Richard Burns	Subaru Impreza S6 WRC '00	34:04.5	(Finland) Marcus Grönholm
Leg 2 (15 Jul)	SS13	Cassidy	20.12 km	(United Kingdom) Colin McRae	Ford Focus RS WRC '00	11:35.9	(Finland) Marcus Grönholm
Leg 2 (15 Jul)	SS14	Batley	19.82 km	(United Kingdom) Colin McRae	Ford Focus RS WRC '00	11:09.0	(Finland) Marcus Grönholm
Leg 2 (15 Jul)	SS15	Waipu Gorge 2	11.24 km	(Finland) Marcus Grönholm	Peugeot 206 WRC	6:33.9	(Finland) Marcus Grönholm
Leg 2 (15 Jul)	SS16	Brooks 2	16.03 km	(Finland) Marcus Grönholm	Peugeot 206 WRC	9:56.8	(Finland) Marcus Grönholm
Leg 2 (15 Jul)	SS17	Paparoa Station 2	11.64 km	(Finland) Marcus Grönholm	Peugeot 206 WRC	6:24.5	(Finland) Marcus Grönholm
Leg 3 (16 Jul)	SS18	Te Akau South	31.24 km	(United Kingdom) Alister McRae	Hyundai Accent WRC	18:46.3	(Finland) Marcus Grönholm
Leg 3 (16 Jul)	SS19	Ridge 1	8.53 km	(United Kingdom) Richard Burns	Subaru Impreza S6 WRC '00	4:46.3	(Finland) Marcus Grönholm
Leg 3 (16 Jul)	SS20	Campbell 1	7.44 km	(United Kingdom) Colin McRae	Ford Focus RS WRC '00	3:55.9	(Finland) Marcus Grönholm
Leg 3 (16 Jul)	SS21	Ridge 2	8.53 km	(United Kingdom) Colin McRae	Ford Focus RS WRC '00	4:45.4	(Finland) Marcus Grönholm
Leg 3 (16 Jul)	SS22	Campbell 2	7.44 km	(United Kingdom) Colin McRae	Ford Focus RS WRC '00	3:51.8	(Finland) Marcus Grönholm
Leg 3 (16 Jul)	SS23	Fyfe 1	8.00 km	(United Kingdom) Colin McRae	Ford Focus RS WRC '00	4:21.8	(Finland) Marcus Grönholm
Leg 3 (16 Jul)	SS24	Fyfe 2	8.00 km	(Norway) Petter Solberg	Ford Focus RS WRC '00	4:17.7	(Finland) Marcus Grönholm

==== Championship standings ====
Pos.	Drivers' championships			Co-drivers' championships			Manufacturers' championships		
Pos.	Move	Driver	Points	Move	Co-driver	Points	Move	Manufacturer	Points
1		(United Kingdom) Richard Burns	38		(United Kingdom) Robert Reid	38		(Japan) Subaru World Rally Team	58
2	1	(Finland) Marcus Grönholm	34	1	(Finland) Timo Rautiainen	34		(United Kingdom) Ford Motor Co. Ltd.	57
3	1	(United Kingdom) Colin McRae	30	1	(United Kingdom) Nicky Grist	30		(France) Peugeot Esso	41
4	1	(Spain) Carlos Sainz	27	1	(Spain) Luis Moya	27		(Japan) Marlboro Mitsubishi Ralliart	29
5	1	(Finland) Tommi Mäkinen	23	1	(Finland) Risto Mannisenmäki	23		(Czech Republic) Škoda Motorsport	8

=== FIA Cup for Production Rally Drivers ===
==== Classification ====
Position		No.	Driver	Co-driver	Entrant	Car	Time	Difference	Points
Event	Class	No.	Driver	Co-driver	Entrant	Car	Time	Difference	Points
1	1	21	(Austria) Manfred Stohl	(Austria) Peter Müller	(Austria) Manfred Stohl	Mitsubishi Lancer Evo VI	3:57:05.4		10
2	2	20	(Uruguay) Gustavo Trelles	(Argentina) Jorge Del Buono	(Uruguay) Gustavo Trelles	Mitsubishi Lancer Evo VI	3:58:51.7	+1:46.3	6
3	3	38	(New Zealand) Reece Jones	(New Zealand) Leo Bult	(New Zealand) Reece Jones	Mitsubishi Lancer Evo VI	3:59:26.3	+2:20.9	4
4	4	36	(New Zealand) Chris West	(New Zealand) Garry Cowan	Mitsubishi Ralliart New Zealand	Mitsubishi Lancer Evo VI	4:00:57.2	+3:51.8	3
5	5	26	(Uruguay) Gabriel Mendez	(Uruguay) Daniel Muzio	(Uruguay) Gabriel Mendez	Mitsubishi Lancer Evo VI	4:02:20.9	+5:15.5	2
6	6	32	(New Zealand) Ross Meekings	(New Zealand) Alan Glen	Mitsubishi Ralliart New Zealand	Mitsubishi Lancer Evo III	4:03:30.9	+6:25.5	1
7	7	22	(Oman) Hamed Al-Wahaibi	(New Zealand) Tony Sircombe	(Oman) Arab World Rally Team	Subaru Impreza WRX	4:03:44.9	+6:39.5	0
8	8	35	(Malaysia) Karamjit Singh	(Malaysia) Allen Oh	(Malaysia) Petronas EON Racing Team	Proton Pert	4:04:02.3	+6:56.9	0
9	9	40	(New Zealand) Kevin Holmes	(New Zealand) Glenn Macneall	(New Zealand) Kevin Holmes	Subaru Impreza WRX	4:04:05.8	+7:00.4	0
10	10	27	(Japan) Fumio Nutahara	(Japan) Satoshi Hayashi	(Japan) Advan-Piaa Rally Team	Mitsubishi Lancer Evo VI	4:05:24.7	+8:19.3	0
11	11	39	(Italy) Domenico Caldarola	(Italy) Paolo Cecchini	(Italy) Domenico Caldarola	Mitsubishi Lancer Evo VI	4:07:58.5	+10:53.1	0
12	12	41	(France) Jean-Louis Leyraud	(New Zealand) Rob Scott	(France) Jean-Louis Leyraud	Subaru Impreza WRX	4:09:40.9	+12:35.5	0
13	13	45	(New Zealand) Karl Robinson	(New Zealand) Tony Aimers	(New Zealand) Karl Robinson	Subaru Impreza 555	4:11:31.6	+14:26.2	0
14	14	61	(Germany) Michael Kahlfuss	(Germany) Ronald Bauer	(Germany) Michael Kahlfuss	Toyota Celica GT-Four	4:27:39.0	+30:33.6	0
15	15	60	(New Zealand) Geoff Newton	(New Zealand) Fleur Pedersen	(New Zealand) Geoff Newton	Mitsubishi Lancer Evo VI	4:32:36.1	+35:30.7	0
16	16	71	(Japan) Kimihide Terao	(Japan) Akihito Tokunou	(Japan) Kimihide Terao	Mitsubishi Lancer Evo III	4:36:36.4	+39:31.0	0
17	17	68	(United Kingdom) Bruce Warburton	(Netherlands) Harmannus Slebos	(United Kingdom) Bruce Warburton	Subaru Impreza WRX	4:36:46.3	+39:40.9	0
18	18	64	(New Zealand) Merv Hatcher	(New Zealand) James Cowles	(New Zealand) Merv Hatcher	Subaru Impreza WRX	4:49:27.6	+52:22.2	0
19	19	70	(Hong Kong) Tommy Chan	(Hong Kong) Chi Ping Chan	(Hong Kong) Tommy Chan	Mitsubishi Lancer Evo V	4:59:28.6	+1:02:23.2	0
20	20	72	(Japan) Nobuaki Takahashi	(Japan) Masako Takahashi	(Japan) Nobuaki Takahashi	Mitsubishi Lancer Evo V	5:00:58.5	+1:03:53.1	0
Retired SS24		33	(Australia) Cody Crocker	(Australia) Greg Foletta	Subaru Rally Team Australia	Subaru Impreza WRX	Excluded - brakes		0
Retired SS19		69	(Hong Kong) Fui On Sing	(Hong Kong) Shui Sang Lau	(Hong Kong) Fui On Sing	Mitsubishi Lancer Evo VI	Retired		0
Retired SS12		56	(United Kingdom) Julian Reynolds	(United Kingdom) Andrew Bull	(United Kingdom) Julian Reynolds	Mitsubishi Lancer Evo V	Accident		0
Retired SS12		62	(New Zealand) Deborah Kibble	(New Zealand) Jamie Kibble	(New Zealand) Deborah Kibble	Mitsubishi Lancer Evo VI	Accident		0
Retired SS5		48	(New Zealand) Glenn Smith	(New Zealand) Dean Stockwell	(New Zealand) Glenn Smith	Mitsubishi Lancer Evo V	Accident		0

==== Special stages ====
Day	Stage	Stage name	Length	Winner	Car	Time	Class leaders
Leg 1 (14 Jul)	SS1	Te Akau North	32.37 km	(Australia) Cody Crocker	Subaru Impreza WRX	18:41.5	(Australia) Cody Crocker
Leg 1 (14 Jul)	SS2	Maungatawhiri	6.52 km	(New Zealand) Reece Jones	Mitsubishi Lancer Evo VI	3:50.5	(Australia) Cody Crocker
Leg 1 (14 Jul)	SS3	Te Papatapu 1	16.62 km	(Australia) Cody Crocker	Subaru Impreza WRX	11:34.0	(Australia) Cody Crocker
Leg 1 (14 Jul)	SS4	Te Hutewai	11.32 km	(Australia) Cody Crocker	Subaru Impreza WRX	8:19.1	(Australia) Cody Crocker
Leg 1 (14 Jul)	SS5	Whaanga Coast	29.52 km	(Australia) Cody Crocker	Subaru Impreza WRX	22:00.9	(Australia) Cody Crocker
Leg 1 (14 Jul)	SS6	Te Papatapu 2	16.62 km	(Oman) Hamed Al-Wahaibi	Subaru Impreza WRX	11:22.7	(Australia) Cody Crocker
Leg 1 (14 Jul)	SS7	Manukau Super 1	2.10 km	(Australia) Cody Crocker	Subaru Impreza WRX	1:28.7	(Australia) Cody Crocker
Leg 1 (14 Jul)	SS8	Manukau Super 2	2.10 km	(Japan) Fumio Nutahara	Mitsubishi Lancer Evo VI	1:27.3	(Australia) Cody Crocker
Leg 2 (15 Jul)	SS9	Waipu Gorge 1	11.24 km	(Austria) Manfred Stohl	Mitsubishi Lancer Evo VI	6:59.6	(Australia) Cody Crocker
Leg 2 (15 Jul)	SS10	Brooks 1	16.03 km	(Uruguay) Gustavo Trelles	Mitsubishi Lancer Evo VI	10:25.2	(Australia) Cody Crocker
Leg 2 (15 Jul)	SS11	Paparoa Station 1	11.64 km	(New Zealand) Reece Jones	Mitsubishi Lancer Evo VI	6:40.9	(Australia) Cody Crocker
Leg 2 (15 Jul)	SS12	Parahi — Ararua	59.00 km	(Austria) Manfred Stohl	Mitsubishi Lancer Evo VI	36:09.7	(Austria) Manfred Stohl
Leg 2 (15 Jul)	SS13	Cassidy	20.12 km	(Austria) Manfred Stohl	Mitsubishi Lancer Evo VI	12:36.3	(Austria) Manfred Stohl
Leg 2 (15 Jul)	SS14	Batley	19.82 km	(Oman) Hamed Al-Wahaibi	Subaru Impreza WRX	11:52.7	(Austria) Manfred Stohl
Leg 2 (15 Jul)	SS15	Waipu Gorge 2	11.24 km	(Austria) Manfred Stohl	Mitsubishi Lancer Evo VI	7:05.2	(Austria) Manfred Stohl
Leg 2 (15 Jul)	SS16	Brooks 2	16.03 km	(Uruguay) Gustavo Trelles	Mitsubishi Lancer Evo VI	10:47.0	(Austria) Manfred Stohl
Leg 2 (15 Jul)	SS17	Paparoa Station 2	11.64 km	(Austria) Manfred Stohl	Mitsubishi Lancer Evo VI	7:00.7	(Austria) Manfred Stohl
Leg 3 (16 Jul)	SS18	Te Akau South	31.24 km	(Australia) Cody Crocker	Subaru Impreza WRX	19:20.3	(Austria) Manfred Stohl
Leg 3 (16 Jul)	SS19	Ridge 1	8.53 km	(Austria) Manfred Stohl	Mitsubishi Lancer Evo VI	5:08.4	(Austria) Manfred Stohl
Leg 3 (16 Jul)	SS20	Campbell 1	7.44 km	(Australia) Cody Crocker	Subaru Impreza WRX	4:13.1	(Austria) Manfred Stohl
Leg 3 (16 Jul)	SS21	Ridge 2	8.53 km	(Austria) Manfred Stohl	Mitsubishi Lancer Evo VI	5:05.1	(Austria) Manfred Stohl
Leg 3 (16 Jul)	SS22	Campbell 2	7.44 km	(Austria) Manfred Stohl	Mitsubishi Lancer Evo VI	4:08.9	(Austria) Manfred Stohl
Leg 3 (16 Jul)	SS23	Fyfe 1	8.00 km	(Australia) Cody Crocker	Subaru Impreza WRX	4:34.3	(Austria) Manfred Stohl
Leg 3 (16 Jul)	SS24	Fyfe 2	8.00 km	(Austria) Manfred Stohl	Mitsubishi Lancer Evo VI	4:31.6	(Austria) Manfred Stohl

==== Championship standings ====
Pos.	Drivers' championships		
Pos.	Move	Driver	Points
1		(Austria) Manfred Stohl	41
2		(Uruguay) Gustavo Trelles	34
3		(Argentina) Gabriel Pozzo	16
4		(Portugal) Miguel Campos	13
5		(Argentina) Claudio Marcelo Menzi	12
