= 2007 Asia-Pacific Rally Championship =

2007 Asia-Pacific Rally season

Seasons
- ← 2006 2008 →

The 2007 Asia-Pacific Rally Championship season (APRC) was an international rally championship organized by the FIA. The champion was Australian driver Cody Crocker.

== Calendar ==
Round	Date	Event	Winner
1	April 13–15	(France) Rallye de Nouvelle Calédonie	(Finland) Jussi Valimaki
2	May 11–13	(New Zealand) Rally of Whangarei	(Australia) Cody Crocker
3	June 1–3	(Australia) Rally of Canberra	(Australia) Cody Crocker
4	July 6–8	(Japan) Rally Hokkaido	(Australia) Cody Crocker
5	August 10–12	(Malaysia) Malaysian Rally	(Australia) Cody Crocker
6	September 7–9	Rally Indonesia	(Finland) Jussi Valimaki
7	November 9–11	China Rally	(Australia) Cody Crocker

== Points ==
Position	Driver	Points
1	(Australia) Cody Crocker	86
2	(Finland) Jussi Valimaki	49
3	(Japan) Katsu Taguchi	47
4	(New Zealand) Brian Green	29
5	(India) Naren Kumar	28
6	(Japan) Hiroshi Yanagisawa	27
7	(Indonesia) Rifat Sungkar	26
8	(India) Gaurav Gill	9
9	(Japan) Yoshio Ikemachi	6
