= 1977 Rally New Zealand =

1977 Rally New Zealand 8th South Pacific Rally
Round 5 of the 1977 World Rally Championship season
← Previous event	Next event →
- Host country: New Zealand
- Rally base: Auckland, New Zealand
- Dates run: 1 – 7 May 1977
- Stages: 69 (2,137 km; 1,328 miles)
- Stage surface: Gravel/tarmac
- Overall distance: 3,821 km (2,374 miles)

Statistics
- Crews: 100 at start, 35 at finish

Overall results
- Overall winner: (Italy) Fulvio Bacchelli (Italy) Francesco Rossetti (Italy) Fiat-Alitalia; Fiat 131 Abarth; 24:29:55

The 1977 Rally New Zealand (also known as the 8th South Pacific Rally) was the fifth round of the fifth World Rally Championship season, and the 6th event in the first Cup for Rally Drivers. It took place on from 1 May until 7 May in the North Island of New Zealand, and the rally was run mainly on gravel. It was the first time the New Zealand event was part of the Word Rally Championship.

== Background ==
Before the race Fiat and Ford had the same number of championship points, while Ford were likely to score big points in New Zealand as about two thirds of the starters would be in Ford Escorts. Fiat thus spent considerable effort on Rally New Zealand, airlifting 11 tonnes of supplies at a cost of over 300 million lira to support the three cars entered. To meet the local rally rules, Fiat had to register their cars locally and the 131 Abarths ran on New Zealand number plates.

Ford, meanwhile, entered Ari Vatanen in a single Escort RS1800 run by the local Masport team - a car which had already been used by Timo Mäkinen in the 1976 Southern Cross Rally. These three were the only factory entries, but nonetheless the rally proved well contested. Ford did invest in pairing local co-driver Jim Scott (two-time winner of the Rally New Zealand, in 1972 and 1976) but he resisted due to Vatanen's reputation for fearsome crashes. Scott did accept the position in the end, but his family insisted on having him call home at the end of each special stage to confirm that he was still alive.

As with the Southern Cross Rally in Australia, WRC organizers permitted certain local cars without FIA homologation to enter the rally under the "Group Pacific" category. This allowed some older Escorts, a Holden Torana, and other cars which used non FIA-sanctioned components to take part.

== Race report ==
The rally ran for a planned 75 special stages in five legs across the North Island, starting at Wellington in the south and finishing in Auckland, at the northern tip. In the end, four stages were cancelled and two more stages were discounted from the final result, leaving 69 stages having been completed. The route was mainly gravel and sand (along with some stretches of volcanic ash), but the rally also included some tarmac. A few stages were cancelled, especially after heavy rains on the first day. Once the race started, the Fiats took the lead, but they soon started experiencing mechanical troubles, with all three cars overheating and Alén being sidelined on a transport stage with a severed waterhose. Trying to make up for lost time, Alén was caught speeding after having fixed his car, being clocked at 132 km/h (82 mph) when the national speed limit was 80 km/h (50 mph) - and then speeding up, rather than stopping for the police. Alén was fined NZ$100, but was also going to be excluded from the race. He continued under appeal, while Fiat's Team Manager Daniele Audetto cajoled, argued, and threatened to have the import of frozen meats from New Zealand to Italy blocked. After hearing numerous legal arguments, including the unusual colour of police car lights in New Zealand (red and yellow, the same as the rally service cars had), the organizers eventually relented when Audetto argued the technicality that disqualifying Alén was not by order of the stewards, but of the Clerk of the course.

Vatanen lived up to his reputation as fast but crash-prone, finishing with barely a straight panel but having won 47 of the 69 stages. He held the lead after the first five stages but then lost 23 minutes after having gone off the road and down a bank, requiring winching back onto the road. He crashed again on the first stage of the second leg, on tarmac at night time, losing another five minutes. A shamefaced Vatanen turned up the pace and at the end of the second leg he was back up in fifth place, behind the three Fiats and Millen's RX-3. Vatanen crashed again early on the third leg, going off the road backwards on a night stage. At the end of the day, he had climbed to fourth place after winning nearly every stage. He kept closing in, and on the rally's longest stage, around 100 km (62 mi), Vatanen performed the feat of passing all three factory Fiats on the course. A puncture set him back again, but Bacchelli also had his fair share of incidents towards the end of the long race: he went off the road on the fourth leg, and for the final day he did two full stages without oil pressure. Bacchelli then took a wrong turn, losing a precious minute. With only a two-minute lead over Vatanen (who had slowed down, lest he run out of luck) he was now nursing his car along at minimum revs, finishing the rally on three cylinders only a minute and a half ahead of Vatanen for his first major rally victory.

At the end of the rally, with their cars eking out a victory and also a third and fourth, Fiat's Team Manager Audetto stated "we won, but it destroyed us."

== Results ==
1977 Rally New Zealand results
Finish		Total time	Group	Car #	Driver Co-driver	Car	Mfr. points
Overall	In group	Total time	Group	Car #	Driver Co-driver	Car	Mfr. points
1	1	24 h : 29 m : 55 s	4	1	(Italy) Fulvio Bacchelli (Italy) Francesco Rossetti	(Italy) Fiat 131 Abarth	18 (10+8)
2	2	24 h : 31 m : 29 s	4	2	(Finland) Ari Vatanen (New Zealand) Jim Scott	(United Kingdom) Ford Escort RS1800 MkII	16 (9+7)
3	3	24 h : 51 m : 54 s	4	3	(Finland) Markku Alén (Finland) Ilkka Kivimäki	(Italy) Fiat 131 Abarth	
4	4	24 h : 55 m : 47 s	4	5	(Finland) Simo Lampinen (Sweden) Sölve Andreasson	(Italy) Fiat 131 Abarth	
5	5	25 h : 47 m : 59 s	4	6	(New Zealand) Rod Millen (New Zealand) Mike Franchi	(Japan) Mazda RX-3	10 (6+4)
6	6	26 h : 09 m : 39 s	4	14	(New Zealand) John Woolf (New Zealand) Grant Whittaker	(Japan) Mazda RX-3	
7	7	28 h : 12 m : 48 s	4	34	(New Zealand) John Sergel (New Zealand) Mike Fletcher	(United Kingdom) Ford Escort RS1800 MkII	
8	1	28 h : 21 m : 45 s	2	39	(New Zealand) Richard Tippett (New Zealand) Adrian Hercock	(United Kingdom) Ford Escort RS2000	
9	8	28 h : 26 m : 41 s	4	46	(New Zealand) Morrie Chandler (New Zealand) Don Campbell	(Japan) Mitsubishi Colt Lancer	3 (2+1)
10	2	28 h : 45 m : 13 s	2	22	(New Zealand) Alan Brough (New Zealand) Mike Galvin	(Japan) Toyota Sprinter Trueno	8 (1+7)
11	3	28 h : 54 m : 03 s	2	66	(New Zealand) Bruce McKenzie (New Zealand) Daniel Rakete	(United Kingdom) Ford Escort RS1600	
12	1	28 h : 55 m : 20 s	1	36	(New Zealand) Robert Brown (New Zealand) Mike Gibbs	(Japan) Mazda RX-3	
13	4	29 h : 00 m : 51 s	2	37	(New Zealand) Dave Morris (New Zealand) Maurice Hiestand	(United Kingdom) Vauxhall Firenza	
14		29 h : 09 m : 36 s	?	21	(New Zealand) Tony Baker (New Zealand) Marlene Baker	(Japan) Datsun 120Y	
15		29 h : 14 m : 07 s	2	19	(New Zealand) George Kuttel (New Zealand) Jenny Kuttel	(United Kingdom) Ford Escort RS1800 MkII	
16		29 h : 28 m : 10 s	?	42	(New Zealand) David Parkes (New Zealand) Robin Parkes	(United Kingdom) Ford Escort 1600 MkII	
17		29 h : 40 m : 40 s	2	30	(New Zealand) Brent Rawstron (New Zealand) Mark Nicholls	(Japan) Toyota	
18		29 h : 41 m : 53 s	2	91	(New Zealand) Steve Russ (New Zealand) Paul Russ	(Japan) Mazda RX-3	
19		29 h : 59 m : 05 s	4	31	(New Zealand) Neil Johns (New Zealand) Hammond de Thierry	(Japan) Mazda RX-3	
20		30 h : 04 m : 21 s	?	49	(New Zealand) Bryan Andrews (New Zealand) Graeme Milne	(United Kingdom) Ford Escort RS2000	
21		30 h : 06 m : 36 s	4	44	(New Zealand) Alfred Goldsbury (New Zealand) Darcy Meier	(Japan) Mazda RX-3	
22		30 h : 12 m : 56 s	?	82	(New Zealand) Stewart McKenzie (New Zealand) Patrick Grant	(Japan) Datsun 1200	
23		30 h : 23 m : 08 s	?	86	(New Zealand) Terry Bell (New Zealand) Jeff Mathews	(United Kingdom) Ford Escort	
24		30 h : 37 m : 16 s	2	64	(New Zealand) Steve Donohue (New Zealand) Tony Hanniffin	(Japan) Mazda RX-3	
25		30 h : 37 m : 30 s		69	(New Zealand) Bill Scott Sr. (New Zealand) Bruce McGhee	(United Kingdom) Ford Escort	
26		30 h : 40 m : 07 s	4	76	(New Zealand) Bruce Powell (New Zealand) Rita Patrick	(Japan) Mazda RX-3	
27		30 h : 43 m : 22 s	?	72	(New Zealand) Max Broad (New Zealand) Sydney Broad	(United Kingdom) Hillman Avenger	
28		30 h : 51 m : 13 s	2	38	(New Zealand) Roger Goss (New Zealand) David Monteith	(Japan) Mazda	
29		30 h : 52 m : 14 s	?	45	(New Zealand) Ross Gordon (United Kingdom) Les Edwards	(United Kingdom) Ford Escort RS1600	
30		31 h : 01 m : 41 s	?	94	(New Zealand) Trevor Barker (New Zealand) Alvin Ferguson	(United Kingdom) Ford Escort	
31		31 h : 28 m : 07 s	?	80	(New Zealand) Don Elliot (New Zealand) Peter Barnie	(Japan) Mazda 808	
32		31 h : 37 m : 17 s	1	78	(New Zealand) Bevan Wilson (New Zealand) Richard McNair	(Japan) Mazda RX-3	
33		32 h : 47 m : 14 s	4	83	(New Zealand) John Short (New Zealand) Martin Olsen	(United Kingdom) Ford Escort	
34		32 h : 55 m : 41 s	?	102	(New Zealand) Richard Prouse (New Zealand) Silvana Prouse	(United Kingdom) Hillman Avenger	
35		33 h : 45 m : 42 s	?	87	(New Zealand) Dick Watson (New Zealand) Lew Richardson	(Japan) Toyota Corolla	

=== Retired ===
Retirements
Car #	Group	Driver Co-driver	Car	Notes
4	4	(New Zealand) Mike Marshall (New Zealand) Arthur McWatt	(United Kingdom) Ford Escort RS1800 MkII	Retired (engine)
7	2	(Philippines) Dante Silverio (Philippines) Sigfriedo Fuentes	(Japan) Toyota Corolla (E30)	Retired
8	4	(New Zealand) Blair Robson (New Zealand) Chris Porter	(United Kingdom) Ford Escort RS1800 MkII	Retired (engine)
9	4	(New Zealand) Colin Taylor (New Zealand) Kingsley Foulkes	(United Kingdom) Ford Escort RS1800 MkII	Retired
10	2	(New Zealand) Paul Adams (New Zealand) Peter Davidson	(United Kingdom) Ford Escort RS1800 MkII	Retired
11	4	(New Zealand) Clive Smith (New Zealand) David Cooke	(United Kingdom) Ford Escort RS1800 MkII	Retired
12	4	(New Zealand) Alan Carter (New Zealand) Rodger Freeth	(United Kingdom) Ford Escort RS1800 MkII	Retired
13	4	(New Zealand) Alan Mitchell (New Zealand) Thomas Matthew	(United Kingdom) Ford Escort RS1800 MkII	Retired
15	4	(New Zealand) Paddy Davidson (New Zealand) Eugene Redgate	(Japan) Datsun 160J	Retired
16	?	(New Zealand) Brian Green (New Zealand) Robert Orr	(United Kingdom) Ford Escort	Retired
17	4	(New Zealand) David Cooney (New Zealand) Russel McKnight	(United Kingdom) Ford Escort RS1800 MkII	Retired
18	4	(New Zealand) Tim Gibbes (New Zealand) Rod Brayshaw	(United Kingdom) Ford Escort RS	Retired
20	4	(New Zealand) Bob Couch (New Zealand) John Couch	(United Kingdom) Ford Escort RS1800 MkII	Retired
23	2	(New Zealand) C. Kirk-Burnnand (New Zealand) Struan Robertson	(Japan) Datsun 510	Retired
24	2	(New Zealand) Gavin Young (New Zealand) Reece Callingham	(Japan) Toyota Corolla	Retired
25	P	(New Zealand) Hugh Armstrong (New Zealand) David Murie	(Australia) Holden Torana	Retired
26	2	(New Zealand) David Civil (New Zealand) Cliff Boyt	(United Kingdom) Ford Escort RS1800 MkII	Retired
27	2	(New Zealand) Bob Robb (New Zealand) Malcolm Gavin	(Japan) Datsun 710	Retired
28	2	(New Zealand) Tony Street (New Zealand) Tom Adams	(United Kingdom) Ford Escort RS2000	Retired
29		(New Zealand) John Gladhill (New Zealand) Gordon Tucker	(United Kingdom) Ford Escort RS2000	Retired
32	4	(New Zealand) Ian Begg (New Zealand) David Leitch	(Japan) Mazda RX-3	Retired
33	4	(New Zealand) Dave Daily (New Zealand) Walter Hart	(United Kingdom) Ford Escort RS1600	Retired
35	4	(New Zealand) Rocky Cribb (New Zealand) Peter Rattenbury	(United Kingdom) Ford Escort	Retired

== Championship standings ==
Position	Team	(Monaco) MON	(Sweden) SWE	(Portugal) POR	(Kenya) KEN	(New Zealand) NZL	(Greece) GRC	(Finland) FIN	(Italy) ITA	(Canada) CAN	(France) FRA	(United Kingdom) GBR	Points
1	(Italy) Fiat	16	14	18		18							66
2	(United Kingdom) Ford		14	16	18	16							64
3	(Germany) Opel	9	17	13									39
4	(Italy) Lancia	18			14								32
=	(Japan) Toyota		10	14		8							32
6	(Sweden) Saab		18										18
=	(Germany) Porsche	14		4									18
8	(Japan) Datsun				16								16
9	(Japan) Mitsubishi				12	3							15
10	(Spain) SEAT	14											14
11	(France) Alpine-Renault	10											10
=	(Japan) Mazda					10							10
13	(Sweden) Volvo		8										8
14	(France) Peugeot				6								6
15	(Soviet Union) Lada		4										4
