= Opossum Creek (Big Creek tributary) =

Stream in the American state of Missouri

Coordinates: 38.3886606°N 91.2812626°W

Opossum Creek (also called Possum Creek) is a stream in Franklin County in the U.S. state of Missouri. It is a tributary of Big Creek.

Opossum Creek was named for the abundance of opossums along its course.

== See also ==
- List of rivers of Missouri
