= Rodger Freeth =

New Zealand motor sport competitor

Personal information
- Nationality: (New Zealand) New Zealander
- Born: 24 December 1953; Tauranga, New Zealand
- Died: 18 September 1993 (aged 39); Perth, Australia

World Rally Championship record
- Years active: 1977, 1979–1980, 1984–1993
- Driver: (New Zealand) Alan Carter (Finland) Pentti Airikkala (New Zealand) John Tee (New Zealand) Neil Allport (New Zealand) Possum Bourne
- Teams: GM Dealer Team New Zealand; Subaru Deutschland; Fuji Heavy Industries; Subaru Motor Sport Group; Subaru Tecnica International; Subaru Rally Team Europe; Subaru Rally Team Australia; Subaru World Rally Team
- Rallies: 24
- Championships: 0
- Rally wins: 0
- Podiums: 0
- Stage wins: 15
- First rally: 1977 Rally New Zealand
- Last rally: 1993 Rally Australia

Rodger Vincent Freeth, 24 December 1953 – 18 September 1993) was a New Zealand motor sport competitor.

== Career ==
He held a PhD in physics and had a distinguished academic and motorsport career. His first love was motorcycles and whilst he was still at university he built a radical Yamaha TZ750A with an aerofoil. As a result, the controlling body (New Zealand Auto-Cycle Union) banned the use of aerodynamic aids in motorcycle racing. He won the Arai 500 endurance race at Mount Panorama Circuit, Bathurst, Australia in 1982 and 1985, as well as NZ titles on NZ-built McIntosh Suzukis.

== Awards and recognition ==
He later became one of New Zealand's best known rally co-drivers, first with Neil Allport and then with Peter "Possum" Bourne. As a driver he also won TraNZam titles in his V8 Starlet.

Freeth died in 1993 as a result of injuries received in an accident on the first day of the World Championship event Rally Australia co-driving for Possum Bourne.

== Complete WRC results ==
Year	Entrant	Car	1	2	3	4	5	6	7	8	9	10	11	12	13	14	WDC	Points
1977	Alan Carter	Ford Escort RS1800	MON	SWE	POR	KEN	NZL; Ret	GRC	FIN	CAN	ITA	FRA	GBR				NC	0
1979	GM Dealer Team New Zealand	Vauxhall Chevette 2300 HS	MON	SWE	POR	KEN	GRC	NZL; Ret	FIN	CAN	ITA	FRA	GBR	CIV			NC	0
1980	John Tee	Ford Escort RS1800	MON	SWE	POR	KEN	GRC	ARG	FIN	NZL; 16	ITA	FRA	GBR	CIV			NC	0
1984	Neil Allport	Ford Escort RS1800	MON	SWE	POR	KEN	FRA	GRC	NZL; Ret	ARG	FIN	ITA	CIV	GBR			NC	0
1985	Neil Allport	Mazda RX-7	MON	SWE	POR	KEN	FRA	GRC	NZL; Ret	ARG	FIN	ITA	CIV	GBR			NC	0
1986	Neil Allport	Mazda RX-7	MON	SWE	POR	KEN	FRA	GRE	NZL; 6	ARG	FIN	CIV	ITA	GBR			36th	6
1986	Neil Allport	Mazda Familia 4WD													USA; 11		36th	6
1987	Neil Allport	Mazda 323 4WD	MON	SWE	POR	KEN	FRA	GRC	USA	NZL; Ret	ARG	FIN	CIV	ITA			NC	0
1987	Subaru Deutschland	Subaru RX Turbo													GBR; Ret		NC	0
1988	Fuji Heavy Industries	Subaru RX Turbo	MON	SWE	POR	KEN; 9	FRA	GRC	USA								72nd	2
1988	Subaru Motor Sport Group	Subaru RX Turbo								NZL; Ret	ARG	FIN	CIV	ITA	GBR		72nd	2
1989	Subaru Technica International	Subaru RX Turbo	SWE	MON	POR	KEN; 7	FRA	GRC	NZL; DSQ	ARG; Ret	FIN	AUS; 10	ITA	CIV	GBR		49th	5
1990	Subaru Technica International	Subaru Legacy RS	MON	POR	KEN; Ret	FRA	GRC	NZL; 5	ARG	FIN	AUS; 4	ITA	CIV	GBR			14th	18
1991	Subaru Rally Team Europe	Subaru Legacy RS	MON	SWE	POR	KEN	FRA	GRE	NZL; Ret	ARG	FIN	AUS; Ret	ITA	CIV	ESP	GBR	NC	0
1992	Subaru Rally Team Australia	Subaru Legacy RS	MON	SWE	POR	KEN	FRA	GRC	NZL; Ret	ARG	FIN	AUS; 6	ITA	CIV	ESP	GBR	34th	6
1993	555 Subaru World Rally Team	Subaru Legacy RS	MON	SWE	POR	KEN	FRA	GRC	ARG	NZL; 6	FIN	AUS; Ret	ITA	ESP	GBR		31st	6

== Other International Rally results ==
Result	Year	Rally	Driver	Car
2	1981	Motogard of Rally New Zealand	Alan Mitchell	Ford Escort RS1800
2	1988	Rally Australia (APRC)	Possum Bourne	Subaru RX Turbo
