= 2009 Asia-Pacific Rally Championship =

2009 Asia-Pacific Rally season

Seasons
- ← 2008 2010 →

The 2009 Asia-Pacific Rally Championship season was an international rally championship sanctioned by the FIA.

Australian Subaru driver Cody Crocker won his fourth successive title, the first driver to do so. Crocker's co-driver, Ben Atkinson likewise wrapped up the co-drivers title. Crocker scored 94 out of a possible 96 points to completely dominate the season.

The Pacific Cup, decided over the first three rallies in the season was won by New Zealand pairing, Hayden Paddon and John Kennard. Crocker won the Asia Cup, held over the later four rallies of the season. Crocker's team mate, New Zealand driver Emma Gilmour finished second in the championship, moving past former champion Katsuhiko Taguchi at the final round to become the first woman to finish in the series top three positions. Subaru won the Manufacturers Cup.

== Calendar ==
The 2009 APRC was as follows:

Round	Date	Event	Location	Winner
1	April 10–12	Rallye de Nouvelle Calédonie	(France) Nouméa, New Caledonia	no registered competitors finished
2	May 9–10	Rally Queensland	Imbil, Australia	(Australia) Cody Crocker
3	June 5–7	Rally of Whangārei	Whangārei, New Zealand	(Australia) Cody Crocker
4	July 11–12	Rally Hokkaido	Hokkaidō, Japan	(Australia) Cody Crocker
5	August 15–16	Malaysian Rally	Malaysia	(Australia) Cody Crocker
6	October 3–4	Rally Indonesia	Indonesia	(Australia) Cody Crocker
7	November 14–15	China Rally	China	(Australia) Cody Crocker

=== Points ===
The 2009 APRC for Drivers points was as follows:

Position	Driver	Vehicle	Round 1	Round 2	Round 3	Round 4	Round 5	Round 6	Round 7	Total
1	(Australia) Cody Crocker	Subaru Impreza WRX		16	16	15	16	15	16	94
2	(New Zealand) Emma Gilmour	Subaru Impreza WRX		7	9	7	11	7	12	53
3	(Japan) Katsuhiko Taguchi	Mitsubishi Lancer Evo		12	11	13		11		47
4	(India) Gaurav Gill	Mitsubishi Lancer Evo		6		1	2	3		12
5	(New Zealand) Brian Green	Mitsubishi Lancer Evo		4	5					9
