= Cody Crocker =

Australian rally and racing car driver

- Nationality: Australian
- Born: 18 October 1971 (age 55) Victoria, Australia

Asia-Pacific Rally Championship
- Years active: 2006–2009
- Teams: Les Walkden Rallying; Motor Image Rally Team
- Wins: 24
- Best finish: 1st in 2006, 2007, 2008 & 2009

Previous series
- 1997-2005: Australian Rally Championship

Championship titles
- 2003 2004 2005 2006 2007 2008 2009: Australian Rally Championship; Australian Rally Championship; Australian Rally Championship; A-Pac Rally Championship; A-Pac Rally Championship; A-Pac Rally Championship; A-Pac Rally Championship

Cody Crocker (born 18 October 1971) is an Australian rally and racing car driver. Crocker won seven titles between 2003 and 2009 and with 24 wins and four consecutive championships is the most successful driver in the history of the Asia-Pacific Rally Championship.

Crocker was discovered in the mid-1990s, winning a junior development title run by Australian Rallysport News (now www.rallysportmag.com) in 1994, coupled with runner up in the Victorian Rally Championship. From the $15,000 prize package, Crocker acquired a second-hand Subaru Legacy and built it for the following season. Part of his prize included entry into Rally Australia, Australia's round of the World Rally Championship, based in Perth, WA.

In 1998, Crocker joined Possum Bourne's team, Subaru Rally Team Australia as the team's Number 2 driver and driver of the team's Group N Impreza while Bourne drove the team's World Rally Car. The following year, Crocker broke through to his first ARC victory at the Rally of Melbourne. Crocker continued as Bourne's backup until Bourne's death in a traffic accident in early 2003. The team rallied around Crocker who won the Forest Rally and Rally of Queensland on his way to winning his first Australian Rally Championship. Two more titles followed, making ten consecutive for the team. Subaru withdrew from rallying at the end of the 2005 season.

Crocker linked up with long-time ARC rivals Les Walkden Rallying with support from Subaru to take on the Asia-Pacific Rally Championship which he won in his debut season despite competing on many of the rallies for the first time. Since then, Crocker has remained undefeated in the APRC even while changing teams. Furthermore, Crocker has had his name assigned to a limited number of Australian market generation IV Liberty/Legacy Spec-B GT turbo models.

== Career results ==
Season	Series	Position	Car	Team
1995	Victorian Rally Championship	2nd		
1997	Australian Rally Championship	8th	Subaru Legacy RS	
1998	Australian Rally Championship	4th	Subaru Impreza WRX	Possum Bourne Motorsport
1999	Australian Rally Championship	3rd	Subaru Impreza WRX	Possum Bourne Motorsport
2000	Australian Rally Championship	3rd	Subaru Impreza WRX	Possum Bourne Motorsport
2001	Australian Rally Championship	3rd	Subaru Impreza WRX	Possum Bourne Motorsport
2002	Australian Rally Championship	2nd	Subaru Impreza WRX	Possum Bourne Motorsport
2003	Australian Rally Championship	1st	Subaru Impreza WRX	Possum Bourne Motorsport
2004	Australian Rally Championship	1st	Subaru Impreza WRX	Possum Bourne Motorsport
2005	Australian Rally Championship	1st	Subaru Impreza WRX	Possum Bourne Motorsport
2006	Asia-Pacific Rally Championship	1st	Subaru Impreza WRX	Les Walkden Rallying
2007	Asia-Pacific Rally Championship	1st	Subaru Impreza WRX	Motor Image Rally Team
2008	Asia-Pacific Rally Championship	1st	Subaru Impreza WRX	Motor Image Rally Team
2009	Asia-Pacific Rally Championship	1st	Subaru Impreza WRX	Motor Image Racing Team
2012	Australian Side x Side Rally Challenge	1st	Polaris RZR 900 XP	Polaris Racing
2013	Australian Side x Side Rally Challenge	1st	Polaris RZR XP 1000	Polaris Racing
2014	Australian Side x Side Rally Challenge	1st	Polaris RZR XP 1000	Polaris Racing
2015	Australian Side x Side Rally Challenge	1st	Polaris RZR XP 1000	Polaris Racing

== Complete WRC results ==
Year	Entrant	Car	1	2	3	4	5	6	7	8	9	10	11	12	13	14	15	16	WDC	Points
1995	Cody Crocker	Subaru Legacy RS	MON	SWE	POR	FRA	NZL	AUS; Ret	ESP	GBR									NC	0
1998	Subaru Rally Team Australia	Subaru Impreza WRX	MON	SWE	KEN	POR	ESP	FRA	ARG	GRE	NZL	FIN	ITA	AUS; 25	GBR				NC	0
1999	Subaru Rally Team Australia	Subaru Impreza WRX	MON	SWE	KEN	POR	ESP	FRA	ARG	GRE	NZL; 15	FIN	CHN	ITA	AUS; Ret	GBR			NC	0
2000	Subaru Rally Team Australia	Subaru Impreza WRX	MON	SWE	KEN	POR	ESP	ARG	GRE	NZL; EX	FIN	CYP	FRA	ITA	AUS; Ret	GBR			NC	0
2001	Subaru Rally Team Australia	Subaru Impreza WRX	MON	SWE	POR	ESP	ARG	CYP	GRE	KEN	FIN	NZL; Ret	ITA	FRA	AUS; 21	GBR			NC	0
2002	Subaru Rally Team Australia	Subaru Impreza WRX STi	MON	SWE	FRA	ESP	CYP	ARG	GRE	KEN	FIN	GER	ITA	NZL; Ret	AUS; 25	GBR			NC	0
2003	Subaru Rally Team Australia	Subaru Impreza WRX STi	MON	SWE	TUR	NZL; 15	ARG	GRE	CYP	GER	FIN	AUS; Ret	ITA	FRA	ESP	GBR			NC	0
2004	Subaru Rally Team Australia	Subaru Impreza WRX STi	MON	SWE	MEX	NZL; 11	CYP	GRE	TUR	ARG	FIN	GER		GBR	ITA	FRA	ESP	AUS; 7	28th	2
2004	Subaru Rally Team Japan	Subaru Impreza WRX STi											JPN; 14						28th	2
2005	Subaru Rally Team Australia	Subaru Impreza WRX STi	MON	SWE	MEX	NZL; 12	ITA	CYP	TUR	GRE	ARG	FIN	GER	GBR		FRA	ESP	AUS; 20	NC	0
2005	Subaru Rally Team Japan	Subaru Impreza WRX STi													JPN; 13				NC	0
2009	Cody Croker	Subaru Impreza STi R4	IRE	NOR	CYP	POR	ARG	ITA	GRE	POL	FIN	AUS; 12	ESP	GBR					NC	0

Sporting positions
Preceded by Possum Bourne	Australian Rally Champion; 2003, 2004 & 2005	Succeeded by Simon Evans
Preceded by Jussi Välimäki	Asia-Pacific Rally Champion; 2006, 2007, 2008 & 2009	Succeeded by Katsuhiko Taguchi
