= Opossum Run =

Stream in Ohio, U.S.

Coordinates: 39°55′01″N 81°28′46″W

Opossum Run is a stream in the U.S. state of Ohio.

Opossum Run received its name from an incident when road workers killed an opossum there.

== See also ==
- List of rivers of Ohio
