= Possum Bourne =

New Zealand rally driver (1956–2003)

Personal information
- Nationality: (New Zealand) New Zealander
- Born: 13 April 1956; Pukekohe, New Zealand
- Died: 30 April 2003 (aged 47); Dunedin, New Zealand

World Rally Championship record
- Years active: 1983–2003
- Co-driver: (New Zealand) Ken Fricker (New Zealand) Michael Eggleton (New Zealand) Mike Fletcher (New Zealand) Jim Scott (New Zealand) Kevin Lancaster (New Zealand) Rodger Freeth (New Zealand) Tony Sircombe (New Zealand) Craig Vincent (Australia) Mark Stacey
- Rallies: 42
- Championships: 0
- Rally wins: 0
- Podiums: 1
- Stage wins: 11
- First rally: 1983 Rally New Zealand
- Last rally: 2003 Rally New Zealand

Peter Raymond George "Possum" Bourne (13 April 1956 – 30 April 2003) was a New Zealand rally driver. He died under non-competitive circumstances while driving on a public road that was to be the track for an upcoming race.

== Awards ==
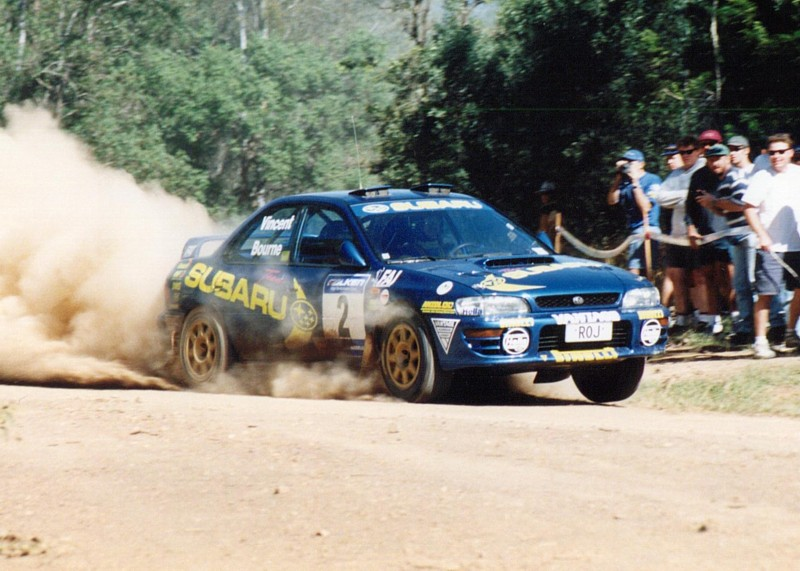
Peter "Possum" Bourne (Rally Queensland 1998)

Bourne was a three-time winner of the Asia-Pacific Rally Championship and the Australian Rally Championship seven times consecutively, amongst many other titles. In 1993 he became the first New Zealand resident to have a works contract in a FISA rally championship, when he drove a Subaru Legacy for Prodrive.

Awards
Years won	Event
1991	New Zealand Rally Championship
1992	Australian Rally Championship (Group N)
1993–1994, 2000	Asia-Pacific Rally Championship
1996–2002	Australian Rally Championship
1989, 1991, 2000	Ashley Forest Rally Sprint
2001	Queenstown Race to the Sky
2002	Hokkaido Rally Japan
2002	Rally New Zealand (Group N)

== Family ==
Bourne lived in Pukekohe, Auckland, near his workshop. He lived with his wife, Peggy Bourne, and three children, Taylor, Spencer, and Jazlin. Bourne earned his nickname, "Possum", on the night he crashed his mother's Humber 80 while trying to avoid a possum in the middle of the road.

Bourne's autobiography, Bourne to Rally, was completed just days before his death. A bronze memorial statue of Bourne, unveiled a year after his death, stood overlooking the place of his death. The statue was moved to Pukekohe town square in April 2013, unveiled alongside the 2013 ITM 400 V8 Championship parade. In 2005, Peggy Bourne entered Race to the Sky, despite having had no formal rally driving experience, as a tribute to her late husband. In 2013, his oldest son Taylor Bourne competed in the 2013 Possum Bourne Memorial Rally with his stepfather and MP Mark Mitchell as co-driver. When Taylor completed the event, he went on to say "It's easy to understand why he loved it so much".

== Car of choice ==
Bourne was best known for his exploits behind the wheel of Subaru cars, initially the RX (the turbocharged version of the Leone), then the Legacy (rebadged as the Liberty for the Australian market because of a perceived clash with charity organisation Legacy Australia).

But it would be the Impreza WRX that Bourne would become most associated with, driving for the Subaru World Rally Team in Rally New Zealand, Australia and also in Indonesia, partnered by Richard Burns in the mid 1990s, before going on to win multiple Australian titles with Subaru Rally Team Australia.

Subaru Japan gave him a black, limited edition Subaru Impreza WRX STi for personal use.

== Death of Rodger Freeth ==
Bourne's best friend and co-driver, Rodger Freeth, died in an accident during 1993 Rally Australia, and the crash almost ended Bourne's career. After encouragement from the Freeth family, he returned to the driver's seat. After Freeth's death, Bourne displayed a "ROJ" license plate on the front of his rally cars.

== Death ==
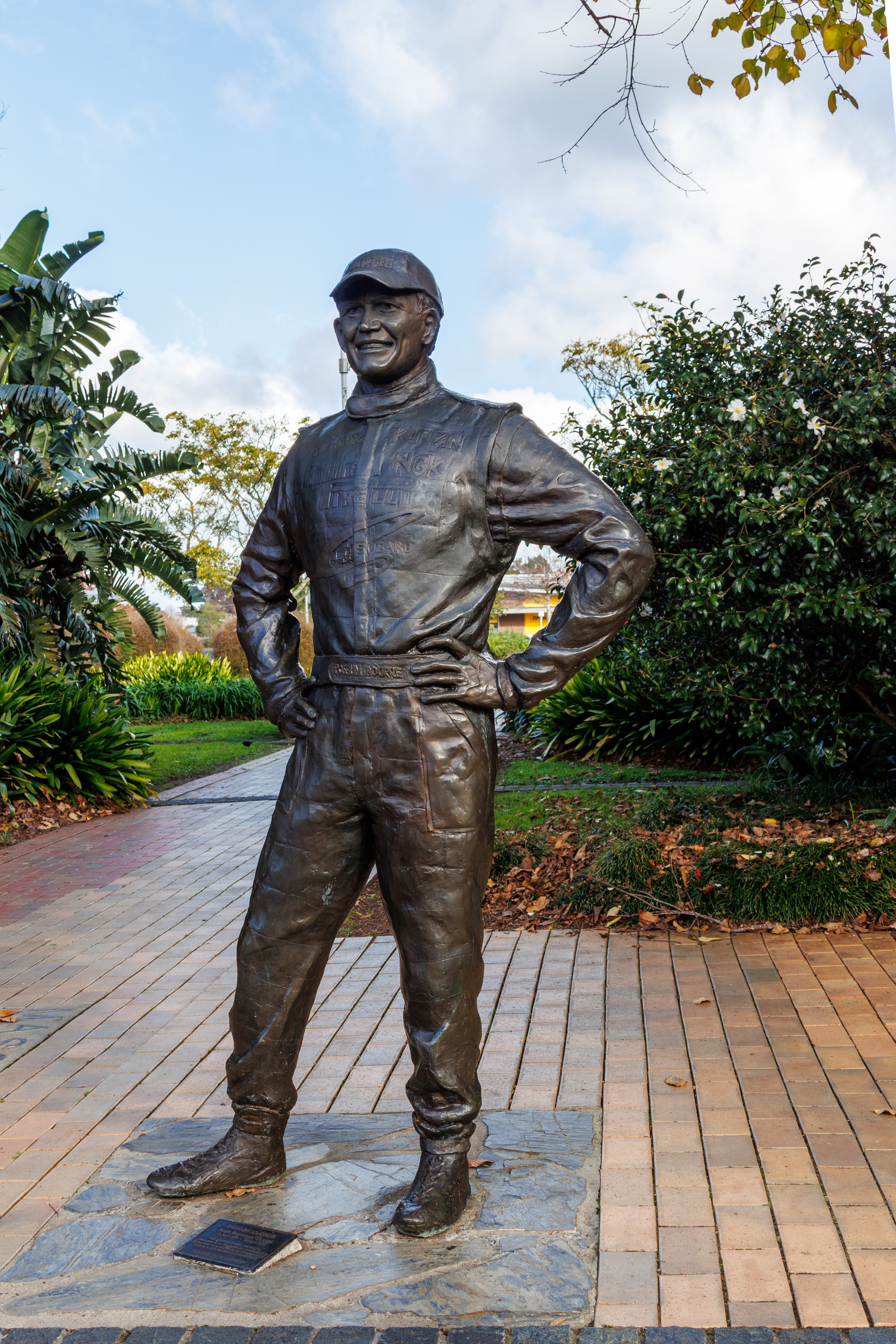
The Possum Bourne Memorial in Pukekohe

Bourne received serious head injuries in a non-competitive car crash on 18 April 2003, and died in Dunedin Hospital on 30 April 2003 after life support was withdrawn. He was driving the Race to the Sky track, on the Waiorau Snow Farm Road which is normally a public road, for the event held in Cardrona, near Wānaka, New Zealand. Driving his Subaru Forester, he collided head on with a Jeep Cherokee driven by rally driver Mike Barltrop who claimed that Bourne was speeding. This treacherous road has over 100 corners and at least 15 hairpins, hence its appeal for rally driving. Barltrop was later arrested on a dangerous driving charge. After pleading guilty to aggravated careless use causing death, Barltrop was sentenced in the Invercargill District Court to 300 hours' community work, disqualified from driving for 18 months, and ordered to pay $10,000 reparations, divided between the intensive care unit of Dunedin Public Hospital and the Possum Bourne Education Trust.

At the time of his death, Bourne had just re-entered the world stage, driving a production-class Subaru Impreza in the PWRC.

== Career results ==
Season	Series	Position	Car	Team
1983	World Rally Championship	28th	Subaru RX	
1984	World Rally Championship	43rd	Subaru RX	
1985	World Rally Championship	51st	Subaru RX	
1986	World Rally Championship	49th	Subaru RX	
1987	World Rally Championship	23rd	Subaru RX	
1988	World Rally Championship	72nd	Subaru RX	
1988	Asia-Pacific Rally Championship	3rd	Subaru RX	
1989	World Rally Championship	49th	Subaru RX	
1990	World Rally Championship	14th	Subaru Legacy RS	
1991	New Zealand Rally Championship	1st	Subaru Legacy RS	
1992	World Rally Championship	34th	Subaru Legacy RS	
1992	Australian Rally Championship	3rd	Subaru Liberty RS	Possum Bourne Motorsport
1993	World Rally Championship	31st	Subaru Legacy RS	
1993	Asia-Pacific Rally Championship	1st	Subaru Legacy RS	Possum Bourne Motorsport
1993	Australian Rally Championship	3rd	Subaru Liberty RS	Possum Bourne Motorsport
1994	Asia-Pacific Rally Championship	1st	Subaru Legacy RS	Possum Bourne Motorsport
1995	World Rally Championship	14th	Subaru Impreza WRX	
1996	World Rally Championship	26th	Subaru Impreza WRX	
1996	Australian Rally Championship	1st	Subaru Impreza WRX	Possum Bourne Motorsport
1997	World Rally Championship	15th	Subaru Impreza WRX	
1997	Australian Rally Championship	1st	Subaru Impreza WRX	Possum Bourne Motorsport
1998	Australian Rally Championship	1st	Subaru Impreza WRX	Possum Bourne Motorsport
1999	World Rally Championship	15th	Subaru Impreza WRC	Possum Bourne Motorsport
1999	Australian Rally Championship	1st	Subaru Impreza WRC	Possum Bourne Motorsport
2000	World Rally Championship	21st	Subaru Impreza WRC	Possum Bourne Motorsport
2000	Asia-Pacific Rally Championship	1st	Subaru Impreza WRC	Possum Bourne Motorsport
2000	Australian Rally Championship	1st	Subaru Impreza WRC	Possum Bourne Motorsport
2001	Australian Rally Championship	1st	Subaru Impreza WRC	Possum Bourne Motorsport
2002	Australian Rally Championship	1st	Subaru Impreza WRX STi	Possum Bourne Motorsport
2003	Production World Rally Championship	14th	Subaru Impreza WRX STi	Possum Bourne Motorsport; Subaru Production Rally Team

== Complete WRC results ==
Year	Entrant	Car	1	2	3	4	5	6	7	8	9	10	11	12	13	14	WDC	Points
1983	Motor Holdings	Subaru Leone 4WD RX 1800	MON	SWE	POR	KEN	FRA	GRE	NZL; 14	ARG	FIN	ITA	CIV	GBR			28th	6
1984	Motor Holdings	Subaru Leone 4WD RX 1800	MON	SWE	POR	KEN	FRA	GRC	NZL; 8	ARG	FIN	ITA	CIV	GBR			43rd	3
1985	Subaru Motor Sport	Subaru Leone 4WD RX 1800	MON	SWE	POR	KEN	FRA	GRC	NZL; 8	ARG	FIN	ITA	CIV	GBR			51st	3
1986	Fuji Heavy Industries	Subaru RX Turbo	MON	SWE	POR	KEN; Ret	FRA	GRE	NZL; Ret	ARG	FIN	CIV	ITA	GBR			49th	3
1986	Peter Bourne	Subaru RX Turbo													USA; 8		49th	3
1987	Fuji Heavy Industries	Subaru RX Turbo	MON	SWE	POR	KEN; 11	FRA	GRC	USA								23rd	12
1987	Subaru Motor Sport Group	Subaru RX Turbo	MON	SWE	POR	KEN	FRA	GRC	USA	NZL; 3	ARG	FIN	CIV	ITA			23rd	12
1987	Subaru Deutschland	Subaru RX Turbo													GBR; Ret		23rd	12
1988	Fuji Heavy Industries	Subaru RX Turbo	MON	SWE	POR	KEN; 9	FRA	GRC	USA								72nd	2
1988	Subaru Motor Sport Group	Subaru RX Turbo								NZL; Ret	ARG	FIN	CIV	ITA	GBR		72nd	2
1989	Subaru Technica International	Subaru RX Turbo	SWE	MON	POR	KEN; 7	FRA	GRC	NZL; DSQ	ARG; Ret	FIN	AUS; 10	ITA	CIV	GBR		49th	5
1990	Subaru Technica International	Subaru Legacy RS	MON	POR	KEN; Ret	FRA	GRC	NZL; 5	ARG	FIN	AUS; 4	ITA	CIV	GBR			14th	18
1991	Subaru Rally Team Europe	Subaru Legacy RS	MON	SWE	POR	KEN	FRA	GRE	NZL; Ret	ARG	FIN	AUS; Ret	ITA	CIV	ESP	GBR	NC	0
1992	Subaru Rally Team Australia	Subaru Legacy RS	MON	SWE	POR	KEN	FRA	GRC	NZL; Ret	ARG	FIN	AUS; 6	ITA	CIV	ESP	GBR	34th	6
1993	555 Subaru World Rally Team	Subaru Legacy RS	MON	SWE	POR	KEN	FRA	GRC	ARG	NZL; 6	FIN	AUS; Ret	ITA	ESP	GBR		31st	6
1994	555 Subaru World Rally Team	Subaru Impreza 555	MON	POR	KEN	FRA	GRC	ARG	NZL; Ret	FIN	ITA	GBR					NC	0
1995	555 Subaru World Rally Team	Subaru Impreza 555	MON	SWE	POR	FRA	NZL; 7	AUS; Ret	ESP	GBR							14th	4
1996	Growth International Motorsport	Subaru Impreza 555	SWE	KEN	IDN	GRC	ARG	FIN	AUS; 8	ITA	ESP						27th	3
1997	Subaru Rally Team Australia	Subaru Impreza 555	MON	SWE	KEN	POR	ESP	FRA	ARG	GRC	NZL; 5	FIN	IDN	ITA	AUS; 5	GBR	16th	4
1998	Subaru Rally Team Australia	Subaru Impreza 555	MON	SWE	KEN	POR	ESP	FRA	ARG	GRC	NZL; Ret	FIN	ITA	AUS; 8	GBR		NC	0
1999	Subaru Rally Team Australia	Subaru Impreza WRC'98	MON	SWE	KEN	POR	ESP	FRA	ARG	GRC	NZL; 5	FIN	CHN	ITA	AUS; Ret	GBR	20th	2
2000	Subaru Rally Team Australia	Subaru Impreza WRC'98	MON	SWE	KEN	POR	ESP	ARG	GRC	NZL; 6	FIN	CYP	FRA	ITA	AUS; 7	GBR	22nd	1
2001	Subaru Rally Team Australia	Subaru Impreza WRC'00	MON	SWE	POR	ESP	ARG	CYP	GRC	KEN	FIN	NZL; 13	ITA	FRA	AUS; Ret	GBR	NC	0
2002	Subaru Rally Team Australia	Subaru Impreza WRX STi	MON	SWE	FRA	ESP	CYP	ARG	GRC	KEN	FIN	GER	ITA	NZL; 13			NC	0
2002	Subaru Rally Team Australia	Subaru Impreza STi N8													AUS; Ret	GBR	NC	0
2003	Subaru Production Rally Team	Subaru Impreza STi N8	MON	SWE; 31	TUR												NC	0
2003	Subaru Production Rally Team	Subaru Impreza WRX STi				NZL; Ret	ARG	GRC	CYP	GER	FIN	AUS	ITA	FRA	ESP	GBR	NC	0

Sporting positions
Preceded by Ross Dunkerton	Winner of the Asia-Pacific Rally Championship; 1993 & 1994	Succeeded by Kenneth Eriksson
Preceded by Katsuhiko Taguchi	Winner of the Asia-Pacific Rally Championship; 2000	Succeeded by Karamjit Singh
Preceded by Neal Bates	Winner of the Australian Rally Championship; 1996, 1997, 1998, 1999, 2000, 2001 & 2002	Succeeded by Cody Crocker
Preceded by David Ayling	Winner of the New Zealand Rally Championship; 1991	Succeeded by Neil Allport
Preceded by Nobuhiro "Monster" Tajima	Winner of the Silverstone Race to the Sky; 2001	Succeeded by Rod Millen
