= 2011 Asia-Pacific Rally Championship =

2011 Asia-Pacific Rally season

Seasons
- ← 2010 2012 →

The 2011 Asia-Pacific Rally Championship season is an international rally championship sanctioned by the FIA. The championship is contested by a combination of regulations with Group N competing directly against Super 2000 cars for points. While the majority of competitors are privately funded, Malaysian manufacturer Proton enters a factory team of Super 2000 Proton Satria's for Australian driver Chris Atkinson and Scot Alister McRae.

British driver Alister McRae won the championship by fourteen points from Chris Atkinson of Australia as he clinched in the final round of the championship held in China.

== Race calendar and results ==
The 2011 APRC is as follows:

Round	Rally name	Podium finishers				Statistics			
Round	Rally name	Rank	Driver	Car	Time	Stages	Length	Starters	Finishers
1	(Malaysia) Malaysian Rally (April 1–3) Result	1	(Australia) Chris Atkinson	Proton Satria Neo S2000	3:14:49.3	15	233.84 km		
1	(Malaysia) Malaysian Rally (April 1–3) Result	2	(India) Gaurav Gill	Mitsubishi Lancer Evolution X	3:16:35.9	15	233.84 km		
1	(Malaysia) Malaysian Rally (April 1–3) Result	3	(United Kingdom) Alister McRae	Proton Satria Neo S2000	3:23:37.5	15	233.84 km		
2	(Australia) Rally Queensland (May 13–15)	1	(United Kingdom) Mark Higgins	Mitsubishi Lancer Evolution X	2:22:14.2	19	230.79 km		
2	(Australia) Rally Queensland (May 13–15)	2	(India) Gaurav Gill	Mitsubishi Lancer Evolution X	2:22:30.0	19	230.79 km		
2	(Australia) Rally Queensland (May 13–15)	3	(Australia) Ryan Smart*	Toyota Corolla Sportivo	2:22:53.7	19	230.79 km		
3	(France) Rallye de Nouvelle Calédonie (June 17–19)	1	(Australia) Chris Atkinson	Proton Satria Neo S2000	3:01:18.0	19	223.84 km		
3	(France) Rallye de Nouvelle Calédonie (June 17–19)	2	(Indonesia) Rifat Sungkar	Mitsubishi Lancer Evolution X	3:02:56.0	19	223.84 km		
3	(France) Rallye de Nouvelle Calédonie (June 17–19)	3	(United Kingdom) Alister McRae	Proton Satria Neo S2000	3:08:53.0	19	223.84 km		
4	(New Zealand) Rally of Whangarei (July 15–17)	1	(Australia) Chris Atkinson	Proton Satria Neo S2000	3:01:26.9	16	301.64 km		
4	(New Zealand) Rally of Whangarei (July 15–17)	2	(New Zealand) Hayden Paddon*	Subaru Impreza WRX STi	3:01:39.3	16	301.64 km		
4	(New Zealand) Rally of Whangarei (July 15–17)	3	(New Zealand) Richard Mason*	Mitsubishi Lancer Evolution X	3:03:15.0	16	301.64 km		
5	(Japan) Rally Hokkaido (September 30 – October 2)	1	(Japan) Toshihiro Arai*	Subaru Impreza WRX STi	2:07:26.7	19	222.89 km		
5	(Japan) Rally Hokkaido (September 30 – October 2)	2	(Japan) Katsuhiko Taguchi	Mitsubishi Lancer Evolution X	2:10:03.8	19	222.89 km		
5	(Japan) Rally Hokkaido (September 30 – October 2)	3	(United Kingdom) Alister McRae	Proton Satria Neo S2000	2:10:12.6	19	222.89 km		
6	China Rally (November 4–6)	1	(United Kingdom) Alister McRae	Proton Satria Neo S2000	3:00:38.6	13			
6	China Rally (November 4–6)	2	(Finland) Jari Ketomaa*	Mitsubishi Lancer Evolution X	3:01:53.5	13			
6	China Rally (November 4–6)	3	(Australia) Chris Atkinson	Proton Satria Neo S2000	3:02:17.0	13			

* - Competitor not registered for Asia-Pacific Rally Championship.

== Championship standings ==
The 2011 APRC for Drivers points is as follows:

Position	Driver	Vehicle	(Malaysia) MAL	(Australia) AUS	(France) NCL	(New Zealand) NZL	(Japan) JPN	(China) CHN	Total
1	(United Kingdom) Alister McRae	Proton Satria Neo S2000	3 ^{6}	4 ^{8}	3 ^{4}	2 ^{8}	2 ^{12}	1 ^{12}	153
2	(Australia) Chris Atkinson	Proton Satria Neo S2000	1 ^{8}		1 ^{12}	1 ^{14}		2 ^{12}	139
3	(Indonesia) Rifat Sungkar	Mitsubishi Lancer Evolution X	^{7}	5 ^{2}	2 ^{8}	^{2}	3 ^{6}	3 ^{6}	89
4	(India) Gaurav Gill	Mitsubishi Lancer Evolution X	2 ^{7}	2 ^{10}	^{7}	^{3}			63
5	(Japan) Katsuhiko Taguchi	Mitsubishi Lancer Evolution X		3 ^{4}	^{3}	^{2}	1 ^{12}		61
6	(United Kingdom) Mark Higgins	Mitsubishi Lancer Evolution X	^{5}	1 ^{10}					39
7	(Malaysia) Karamjit Singh	Proton Satria Neo S2000		6	9	7	8	4 ^{1}	33
8	(New Zealand) Brian Green	Mitsubishi Lancer Evolution IX	4 ^{2}		5	6			32
9	(Japan) Akira Bamba	Proton Satria Neo S2000	7	8		8	9	5 ^{2}	28
10	(China) Fan Fan	Mitsubishi Lancer Evolution X	5 ^{1}	7	7	9		^{2}	27
11	(New Zealand) Matt Jansen	Subaru Impreza WRX STi				3 ^{1}			16
12	(Japan) Seiichiro Taguchi	Mitsubishi Lancer Evolution IX					4 ^{3}		15
13	(France) Alain Dalstein	Mitsubishi Lancer Evolution IX			4 ^{2}				14
14	(New Zealand) Ben Jagger	Subaru Impreza WRX STi				4 ^{1}			13
15	(Japan) Atsushi Masumura	Mitsubishi Lancer Evolution X					5 ^{2}		12
16	(New Zealand) Ben Hunt	Ford Fiesta ST				5			10
17	(Japan) Takahiro Yoshii	Mitsubishi Lancer Evolution VIII					6 ^{1}		9
18	(Malaysia) Muhammad Udhaya	Subaru Impreza WRX	6						8
18	(France) Emmanuel Guigou	Renault Clio R3			6				8
20	(China) Hao Yuan	Mitsubishi Lancer Evolution X		9	8			^{1}	7
21	(Japan) Fuyuhiko Takahashi	Subaru Impreza WRX STi					7		6
22	(Malaysia) Gunaseelan Rajoo	Mitsubishi Lancer Evolution IX	8		10				5
22	(New Zealand) Sloan Cox	Mitsubishi Lancer Evolution X				^{5}			5
24	(Australia) Nathan Quinn	Mitsubishi Lancer Evolution IX		^{3}					3
25	(Australia) Razvan Vlad	Ford Fiesta ST		10					1

Key
Colour	Result
Gold	Winner
Silver	2nd place
Bronze	3rd place
Green	Points finish
Blue	Non-points finish
Blue	Non-classified finish (NC)
Purple	Did not finish (Ret)
Black	Excluded (EX)
Black	Disqualified (DSQ)
White	Did not start (DNS)
White	Cancelled (C)
Blank	Withdrew entry from the event (WD)

Note: ^{1} – ^{7} refers to the bonus points awarded for each leg of the rally for the first five place getters, 1st (7), 2nd (5), 3rd (3), 4th (2), 5th (1). There are two bonus legs for each rally.
