= Rally China =

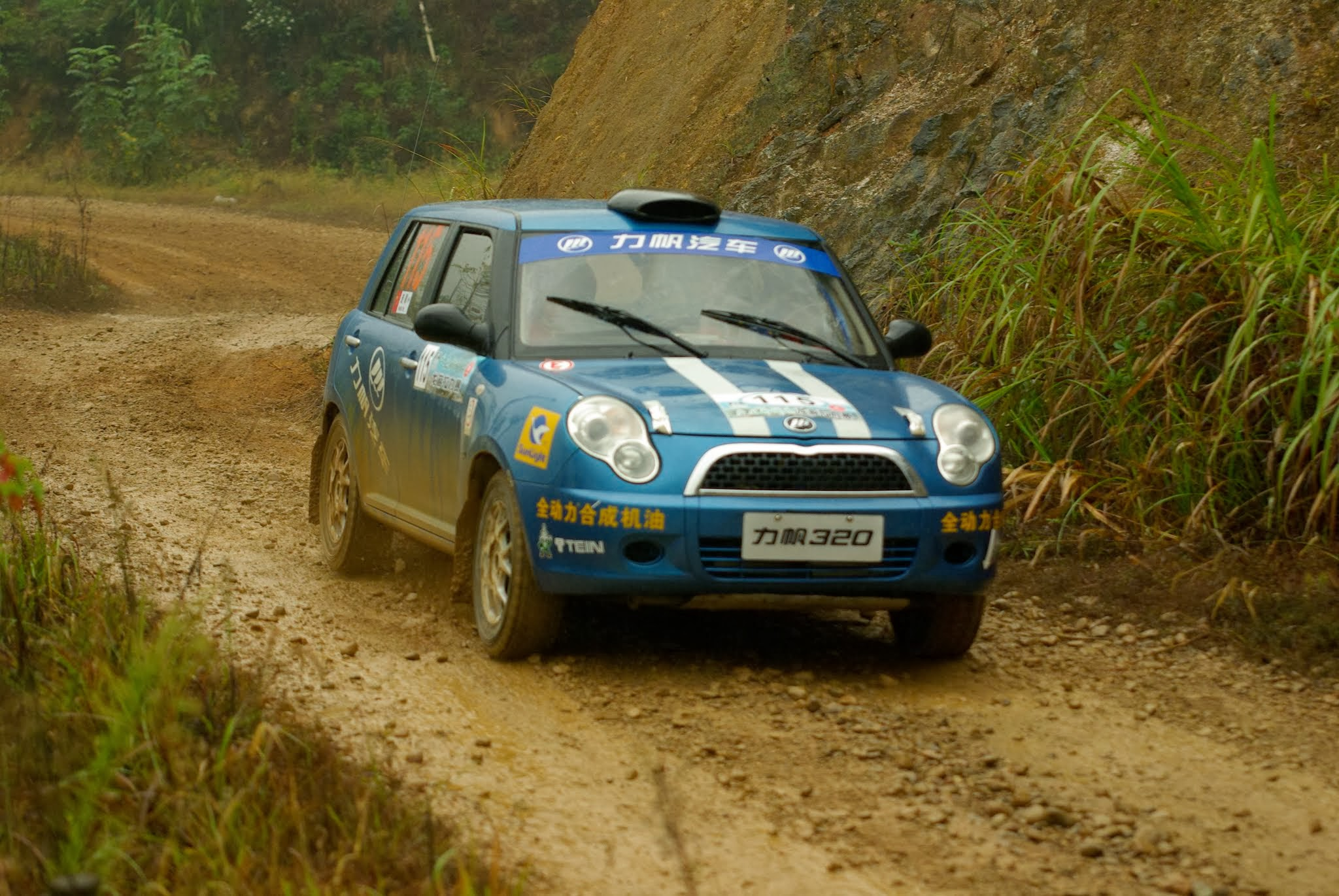
A Lifan 320 at the 2013 China Rally

The Rally China (中国拉力赛) is the largest rallying event held in China.

The first event was run as the China Rally in 1997 in the province of Guangdong, as a replacement to the Hong Kong - Beijing Rally, Started in 1985 as tradition span over 3,400+ kilometers from Tsim Sha Tsui / Hong Kong all the way to Tian'anment Square in Beijing, China. This was an event on the World Rally Championship (WRC) calendar in 1999. However it was replaced by the Cyprus Rally the following year.

From 2000 to 2015, it has been part of the Asia Pacific Rally Championship (APRC), moving initially to Shaoguan, Guangdong province. "Force majeure because of government", according to the organisers, led to the cancellation of the event in 2003. The event moved for a single year to Huizhou, Guangdong in 2004 before reverting to Shaoguan.

From 2009 until 2015, the event was hosted in Longyou, Zhejiang province. The event returned to the WRC calendar in 2016 after moving to Huairou, Beijing, but was cancelled due to weather damage. China will continue to host a round of the Asia-Pacific Rally Championship in Zhangye, Gansu in 2016 too, while Longyou will continue to host a round of the Chinese Rally Championship.

== List of previous winners ==
=== Rally China ===
Year	Name	Dates	Winner	Car	Rally Classification
1997	1st China Rally	11–13 July	(United Kingdom) Colin McRae	Subaru Impreza WRC 97	APRC
1998	2nd China Rally	2–4 October	(United Kingdom) Colin McRae	Subaru Impreza WRC 98	APRC
1999	3rd China Rally	17–19 September	(France) Didier Auriol	Toyota Corolla WRC	WRC
2000	4th 555 China Rally	7–9 September	(New Zealand) Peter 'Possum' Bourne	Subaru Impreza WRX	APRC
2001	5th Rally of China Shaoguan	20–22 October	(Italy) Nico Caldarola	Mitsubishi Lancer Evolution VI	APRC
2002	6th Rally of China Shaoguan	19–21 October	(Malaysia) Karamjit Singh	Proton Pert	APRC
2004	7th TCL China Rally Huizhou	22–24 October	(Japan) Katsuhiko Taguchi	Mitsubishi Lancer Evolution VIII	APRC
2005	8th China Rally Shaoguan	26–28 November	(Finland) Jussi Välimäki	Mitsubishi Lancer Evolution VIII	APRC
2006	9th China Rally Shaoguan	24–26 November	(Australia) Cody Crocker	Subaru Impreza WRX STi	APRC
2007	10th China Rally Shaoguan	09-11 November	(Australia) Cody Crocker	Subaru Impreza WRX STi	APRC
2008	11th China Rally Shaoguan	08-9 November	(Australia) Cody Crocker	Subaru Impreza WRX STi	APRC
2009	12th China Rally	14–15 November	(Australia) Cody Crocker	Subaru Impreza WRX STi	APRC
2010	13th China Rally	6–7 November	(Japan) Yuya Sumiyama	Mitsubishi Lancer Evolution X	APRC
2011	14th China Rally	4–6 November	(United Kingdom) Alister McRae	Proton Satria Neo S2000	APRC
2012	15th China Rally	26–28 October	(United Kingdom) Alister McRae	Proton Satria Neo S2000	APRC
2013	16th China Rally	2–3 November	(Finland) Esapekka Lappi	Škoda Fabia S2000	APRC
2014	17th Rally China Longyou	7–9 November	(Australia) Chris Atkinson	Volkswagen Golf SCRC	APRC
2015	18th Rally China Longyou	30 October–1 November	(Sweden) Pontus Tidemand	Škoda Fabia R5	APRC
2016	19th Rally China Beijing	8–11 September	Rally cancelled		WRC
2018	20th Rally China Longyou	20-21 October	(Estonia) Karl Kruuda	Volkswagen Golf SCRC	APRC
2019	21st China Rally Longyou	26-27 October	(Chinese Taipei) Lin De-wei	Subaru XV	APRC
2020	22nd China Rally Longyou	16-18 October	Rally cancelled		APRC
2023	23rd China Rally Longyou	20-22 September	(China) Xu Jun	Škoda Fabia R5	APRC
2024	24th China Rally Longyou	26-29 October	(Chinese Taipei) Lin De-wei	Hyundai i20 N R5	APRC
