= International Rally of Johor =

The Malaysian Rally, known previously as Rally Malaysia and Rally of Malaysia, is a rallying event held in the state of Johor, at the southern tip of Peninsular Malaysia. The rally is based out of the state capital Johor Bahru.

An earlier version of the Malaysian Rally was called "The South Malaysia Rally". organized by the Singapore Motor Club, the first event was held in 1964. Records on hand do not include the inaugural event but the South Malaysian Rally was held at least through 1969. The SMC was closely involved with the Forces Driving Club in Singapore, and many of the rallies were jointly produced, with competitors from both clubs. Records on hand record the following winners:

- 1965 and 1966 - John & Audrey Piggott, Saab 99
- 1967 - "Dickie" Arblaster & Charles Green, Austin 1800
- 1968 - Joe Minto & Derek Pattinson, Toyota Corona
- 1969 - Derek Minto & David Appleyard, Opel Kadett

The rally was first held in the mid-1970s, a legacy of British colonial influence in Malaysia and has been a long running part of the Malaysian Rally Championship and the Asia-Pacific Rally Championship. The long history of rallying in the region has seen Malaysian drivers emerge with Karamjit Singh winning the rally in 2001 before going on to become a three-time Asia-Pacific champion. Malaysian manufacturer Proton Cars has also used the rally to show off its products, both the badge-engineered Proton Pert and its own design the Proton Satria. The rally has proven to be a happy hunting ground for Australians with both Ross Dunkerton and Cody Crocker winning the rally four years running. The Johor Rally is discontinued after the 2018 APRC round.

== List of winners ==
Sourced in part from:

Year	Winner	Car
1988	(Finland) Lasse Lampi	Mitsubishi Galant VR-4
1989	(Australia) Ross Dunkerton	Mitsubishi Galant VR-4
1990	(Australia) Ross Dunkerton	Mitsubishi Galant VR-4
1991	(Australia) Ross Dunkerton	Mitsubishi Galant VR-4
1992	(Australia) Ross Dunkerton	Mitsubishi Galant VR-4
1993	(United Kingdom) Colin McRae	Subaru Legacy RS
1994	(New Zealand) Possum Bourne	Subaru Impreza WRX
1995	(Sweden) Kenneth Eriksson	Mitsubishi Lancer Evo III
1996	(Sweden) Kenneth Eriksson	Subaru Impreza WRX
1997	(Japan) Yoshio Fujimoto	Toyota Celica GT-Four
1998	(Japan) Yoshio Fujimoto	Toyota Corolla WRC
1999		
2000	(New Zealand) Possum Bourne	Subaru Impreza WRX
2001	(Malaysia) Karamjit Singh	Proton Pert
2002		
2003	(New Zealand) Brian Green	Subaru Impreza WRX STi
2004		
2005	(Japan) Toshihiro Arai	Subaru Impreza WRX STi
2006	(Australia) Cody Crocker	Subaru Impreza WRX STi
2007	(Australia) Cody Crocker	Subaru Impreza WRX STi
2008	(Australia) Cody Crocker	Subaru Impreza WRX STi
2009	(Australia) Cody Crocker	Subaru Impreza WRX STi
2010	(Japan) Katsuhiko Taguchi	Mitsubishi Lancer Evo X
2011	(Australia) Chris Atkinson	Proton Satria Neo S2000
2012	(United Kingdom) Alister McRae	Proton Satria Neo S2000
2013	(China) Fan Fan	Mitsubishi Lancer Evolution X
2014	(India) Gaurav Gill	Škoda Fabia S2000
2015	(Sweden) Pontus Tidemand	Škoda Fabia S2000
