= Rallye de Nouvelle-Calédonie =

The Rallye de Nouvelle-Calédonie is a rallying event held in the French island of New Caledonia. The rally dates back as far as 1967 and was known then as the New Caledonia Safari. That first rally was won by Australian driver John Keran driving a Volvo 122S. The rally was promoted to international status as a round of the Asia Pacific Rally Championship (APRC) in 1999. In 2000 the rally was dropped from the APRC but returned in 2001 and has been part of the regional championship ever since, although the 2003 event was abandoned due to heavy rain.

The event is known for its treacherous conditions as when wet the forest roads turn to mud quickly and it quite steep as it climbs the volcanic spine of the island. With its strong French culture the island rally has a different atmosphere from the East Asian and Australasian legs of the APRC. Entrants are an odd mix of local teams, which vary from small amateur/privateer teams to professional teams run by import-associated businesses like Car Sales and Vehicle Rentals and a small group teams from Australia, New Zealand and all across Asia from as far away as India and Japan. Motor vehicle importer Jean-Louis Leyraud is one of the islands most famous athletes and has won the rally three times, competing in the event from the early 1970s through to the late 2000s, winning the New Caledonia championship 11 times.

Since joining the Asia-Pacific championship a number of competitors have claimed multiple victories: Malaysian driver Karamjit Singh, Finnish driver Jussi Välimäki, Japanese driver Katsuhiko Taguchi and most recently Indian driver Gaurav Gill.

== List of winners of APRC events ==
Sourced in part from:

Year	Winner	Car
1999	(France) Jean-Louis Leyraud	Subaru Impreza WRX
2000		
2001	(France) Jean-Louis Leyraud	Subaru Impreza WRX
2002	(Malaysia) Karamjit Singh	Proton Pert
2003	abandoned due to weather	
2004	(New Zealand) Geof Argyle	Mitsubishi Lancer Evo VIII
2005	(Finland) Jussi Välimäki	Mitsubishi Lancer Evo VIII
2006	(Japan) Katsuhiko Taguchi	Mitsubishi Lancer Evo VIII
2007	(Finland) Jussi Välimäki	Mitsubishi Lancer Evo VIII
2008	(Japan) Katsuhiko Taguchi	Mitsubishi Lancer Evo IX
2009	(France) Claude Clavel	Subaru Impreza WRX STi
2010	(Australia) Brendan Reeves	Subaru Impreza WRX STi
2011	(Australia) Chris Atkinson	Proton Satria Neo S2000
2012	(India) Gaurav Gill	Škoda Fabia S2000
2013	(India) Gaurav Gill	Škoda Fabia S2000
2014	(France) Emmanuel Guigou	Renault Clio R3
2015	(India) Gaurav Gill	Škoda Fabia S2000
