= 2003 Asia-Pacific Rally Championship =

2003 Asia-Pacific Rally season

Seasons
- ← 2002 2004 →

The 2003 Asia-Pacific Rally Championship season (APRC) was an international rally championship organized by the FIA. The champion was German driver Armin Kremer.

== Calendar ==
Round	Date	Event	Winner
1	April 25–27	(Australia) Rally of Canberra	(Germany) Armin Kremer
2	June 10–13	(New Zealand) Rally of Rotorua	(Japan) Fumio Nutahara
3	September 12–14	(Japan) Rally Hokkaido	(New Zealand) Geoff Argyle
4	Oct 31-Nov 2	Rally of Thailand	(Malaysia) Karamjit Singh
5	December 4–7	India Rally	(Malaysia) Karamjit Singh

== Points ==
Position	Driver	Points
1	(Germany) Armin Kremer	53
2	(Malaysia) Karamjit Singh	52
3	(New Zealand) Geoff Argyle	45
4	(Japan) Fumio Nutahara	37
5	(Australia) Chris Atkinson	18
6	(New Zealand) Andrew Hawkeswood	16
7	(Italy) Nico Caldarola	12
=	(Australia) David Doppelreiter	12
9	(New Zealand) Brian Green	11
10	(Japan) Atsushi Masumura	8
11	(Italy) Norberto Cangani	3
=	(Japan) Haruo Takakuwa	3
