= 2004 Asia-Pacific Rally Championship =

2004 Asia-Pacific Rally season

Seasons
- ← 2003 2005 →

The 2004 Asia-Pacific Rally Championship season (APRC) was an international rally championship organized by the FIA. The champion was Malaysian driver Karamjit Singh.

== Calendar ==
Round	Date	Event	Winner
1	May 7–9	(Australia) Rally of Canberra	(Malaysia) Karamjit Singh
2	May 28–30	(France) Rallye de Nouvelle Calédonie	(New Zealand) Geof Argyle
3	June 9–10	(New Zealand) Rally of Rotorua	(Malaysia) Karamjit Singh
4	September 3–5	Rally Japan	(Malaysia) Karamjit Singh
5	October 16–18	China Rally	(Japan) Katsuhiko Taguchi
6	December 3–5	India Rally	(Malaysia) Karamjit Singh

== Points ==
Position	Driver	Points
1	(Malaysia) Karamjit Singh	73
2	(Germany) Armin Kremer	48
3	(Japan) Katsuhiko Taguchi	47
4	(New Zealand) Geof Argyle	37
5	(Australia) Chris Atkinson	27
6	(New Zealand) Brian Green	16
7	(Italy) Nico Caldarola	13
8	(Finland) Vesa Mikkola	9
9	(New Zealand) Dermott Malley	8
