= Rally Hokkaido =

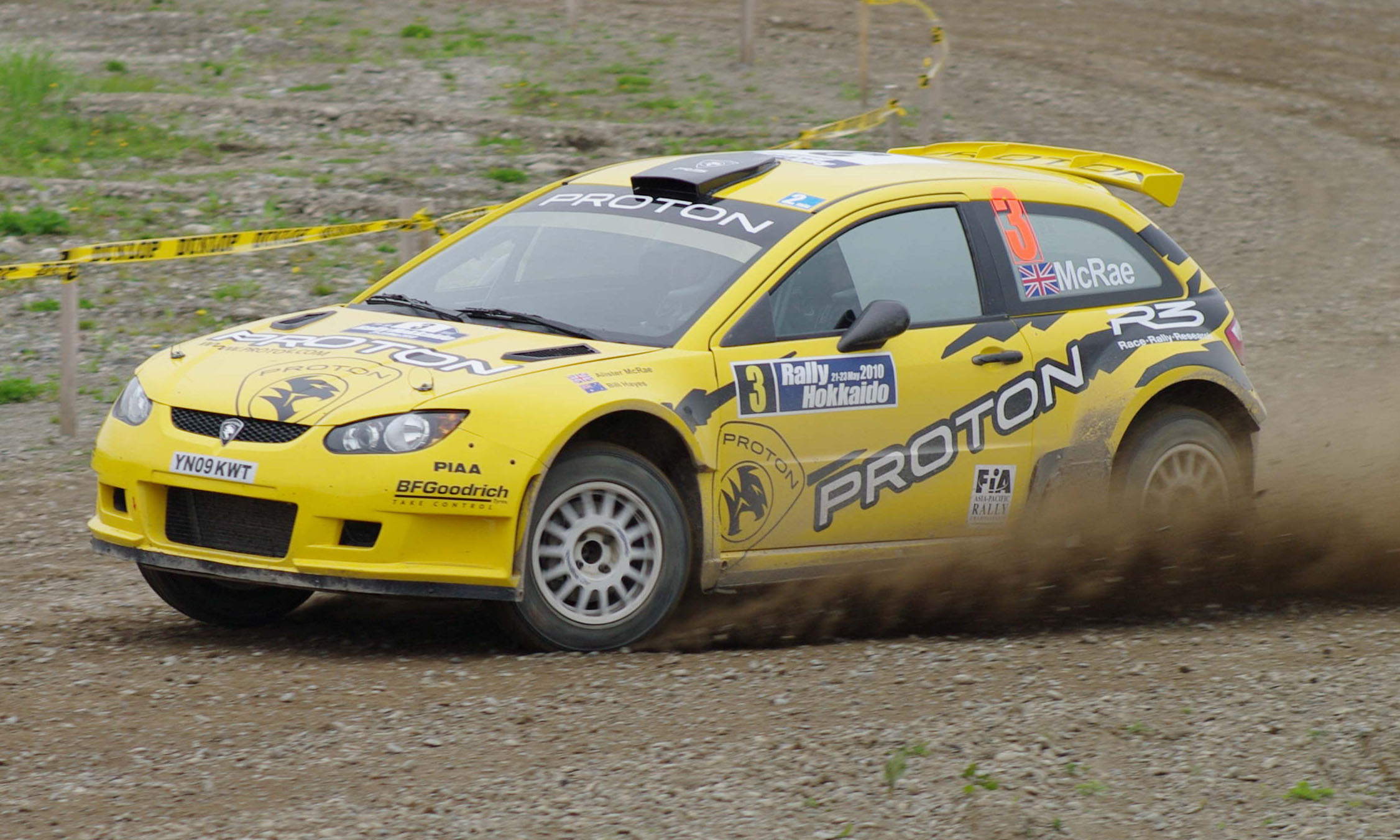
A Proton Satria Neo S2000 driven by Alister McRae at the 2010 Rally Hokkaido

The Rally Hokkaido (ラリー北海道), is an international rallying event held on the island of Hokkaidō in Japan.

The rally was first held in 2002 as Japan's entry into the Asia-Pacific Rally Championship and Japan's return to international rallying.

In 2004 the rally was promoted to World Championship status as the inaugural Rally Japan. The following year the World and Asia-Pacific rallies were split into separate rallies with both still being held in Hokkaido with Rally Japan as the WRC round, Rally Hokkaido as the APRC round. It has been throughout a Japan Rally Championship event as well.

The event has been dominated by Subaru Imprezas. Local driver Toshihiro Arai has won his home event six times.

== List of winners ==
Sourced in part from:

Year	Winner	Car
2002	(New Zealand) Possum Bourne	Subaru Impreza WRX STi
2003	(Japan) Toshihiro Arai	Subaru Impreza WRX STi
2004	(Norway) Petter Solberg	Subaru Impreza WRC 2004
2005	(Japan) Katsuhiko Taguchi	Mitsubishi Lancer Evo III
2006	(Japan) Toshihiro Arai	Subaru Impreza WRX STi
2007	(Australia) Cody Crocker	Subaru Impreza WRX STi
2008	(Japan) Toshihiro Arai	Subaru Impreza WRX STi
2009	(Australia) Cody Crocker	Subaru Impreza WRX STi
2010	(Japan) Toshihiro Arai	Subaru Impreza WRX STi
2011	(Japan) Toshihiro Arai	Subaru Impreza WRX STi
2012	(Japan) Toshihiro Arai	Subaru Impreza WRX STi
2013	(India) Gaurav Gill	Škoda Fabia S2000
2014	(Czech Republic) Jan Kopecký	Škoda Fabia S2000
2015	(Sweden) Pontus Tidemand	Škoda Fabia S2000
2016	(India) Gaurav Gill	Škoda Fabia R5
2017	(India) Gaurav Gill	Škoda Fabia R5
2018	(Japan) Yuya Sumiyama	Škoda Fabia R5
2019	(New Zealand) Mike Young	Toyota C-HR
2023	(Finland) Jari-Matti Latvala	Toyota GR Yaris Rally2
