= Asia-Pacific Rally Championship =

FIA regional rally championship

- Country: Asia; Oceania
- Inaugural season: 1988
- Drivers' champion: (New Zealand) Hayden Paddon
- Official website: fiaaprc.com

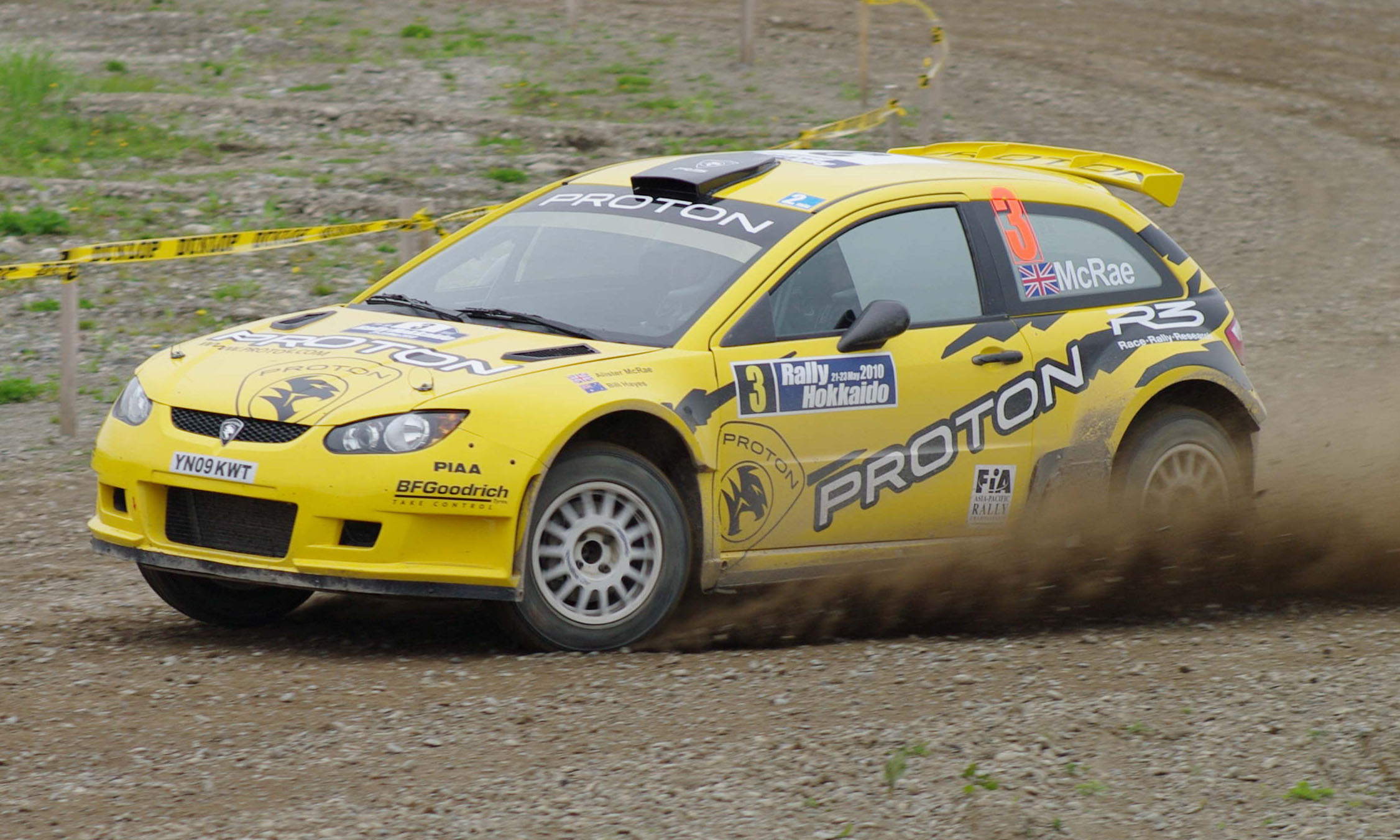
A Proton Satria Neo S2000 driven by 2011 champion Alister McRae at the 2010 Rally Hokkaido

The Asia-Pacific Rally Championship (APRC) is an international rally championship organized by the FIA encompassing rounds in Asia and Oceania. Group N cars dominated the championship for many years but in recent years cars built to R5 and S2000 regulations have tended to be the frontrunners.

== History ==
The championship was first held in 1988, created out of the successful expansion of the World Rally Championship into Asia and linking with the debut of Rally Australia and won by Japan's Kenjiro Shinozuka in a Mitsubishi Galant VR-4. Initially the championship had strong support from World Rally Championship teams, aided by more than half the calendar being WRC rallies and by Japanese manufacturers backing half of the front runners with Mazda, Toyota, Mitsubishi and Subaru all running front running teams. Toyota's double World Rally Champion Carlos Sainz won the championship in 1990, Juha Kankkunen, Didier Auriol, Colin McRae, Tommi Makinen, Richard Burns and Ari Vatanen all won rallies. Several WRC teams used the championship as a junior development squad. By the late 1990s, the big teams were dropping away from the championship, or were running drivers from the region. The 2000 Rally New Zealand was the last joint WRC/APRC event and the WRC teams and manufacturers left and regional teams, like Subaru's New Zealand–based team and regional manufacturers like Proton were sharing the wins with privately run teams.

The shift to Group N and away from WRC regulations assisted as only Subaru and Mitsubishi had eligible cars for Group N. By the mid-2000s the teams were all privateers. The growth of Super 2000 regulations saw manufacturer teams return led by Proton.

Since 2013 Skoda have used the championship to develop young European-based drivers, with Esapekka Lappi, Jan Kopecký, Pontus Tidemand and Ole Christian Veiby all going on to compete at WRC-2 level.

The championship has also been a proving ground for regional talent, even when World Rally teams were competing regional drivers from Japan, Australia and New Zealand. Malaysian driver Karamjit Singh brought the first victory for a driver from one of the emerging APRC nations with Jean-Louis Leyraud from the French Pacific island of New Caledonia and India's Gaurav Gill followed. The occasional European driver has moved into the region to find a cheaper series to compete in instead of the expensive European Rally Championship, like Jussi Valimaki.

Reflecting its roots as a subsidiary of the World Rally Championship it had class championships within the main championship for Group N cars and naturally aspirated Two Litre cars. In more modern times the sub-classes have been split geographically rather than technically, allowing competitors to compete for smaller portions of the series to bolster flagging entry numbers. The championships created were the Asia Cup, taking in Asian continent events in Japan, Indonesia, Malaysia and China with Thailand joining in 2003. The Pacific Cup takes in Oceania events in Australia, New Zealand and New Caledonia.

By taking victory at the 2009 Indonesian Rally, Australian Cody Crocker became the most successful driver in APRC history, winning his fourth consecutive title, all in Subarus. Four drivers have won three APRC titles each; New Zealander Possum Bourne, Kenneth Eriksson of Sweden, Malaysia's Karamjit Singh and India's Gaurav Gill.

The championship presently has events in New Zealand, Australia, Malaysia, Japan, China and India. In the past the championship has run events in New Caledonia, Thailand and Indonesia.

After a two-year hiatus due to COVID-19 travel restrictions, APRC returned in 2022 with the first round held in Chennai's Madras International Circuit in India. Debutantes Karna Kadur and co-driver Nikhil Pai won the first round of the Asia Cup and qualified for the finals. Hayden Paddon won the APRC 2022 title. In 2023, Indonesia's Rifat Sungkar and Aussie co-driver Ben Searcy won the APRC title while H.Rahmat and co-driver Hade Mboi lifted the Asia Cup.

== List of events ==
Sourced from:

| Event | Years active |
|---|---|
| Rally New Zealand | 1988–2000 |
| (Malaysia) Malaysian Rally | 1988–1998, 2000–2001, 2005–2019 |
| (India) Himalayan Rally | 1988–1990 |
| Rally Australia | 1988–1998 |
| Rally Indonesia | 1989–1997, 2000, 2005–2009, 2019, 2022–present |
| Thailand Rally | 1992–2003, 2005, 2013 |
| Hong Kong Beijing Rally | 1994–1996 |
| China Rally | 1997–2002, 2004–present |
| (Australia) Rally of Canberra | 1999–2008, 2017 |
| (New Caledonia) Rallye de Nouvelle-Calédonie | 2001–2002, 2004–2016 |
| (New Zealand) Rally of Rotorua | 2001–2006 |
| (Japan) Rally Hokkaido | 2002–present |
| Rally India | 2003–2004 |
| (New Zealand) International Rally of Whangarei | 2007–present |
| (Australia) International Rally of Queensland | 2009–2016 |
| Rally of India | 2015–present |
| (New Zealand) International Rally of Otago | 2019–present |

== APRC Champions ==
Sourced from:

| Season | Driver | Co-driver | Car | Team |
|---|---|---|---|---|
| 1988 | (Japan) Kenjiro Shinozuka | (Lithuania) Fred Gocentas | Mitsubishi Galant VR-4 | |
| 1989 | (New Zealand) Rod Millen | (New Zealand) Tony Sircombe | Mazda 323 4WD | |
| 1990 | (Spain) Carlos Sainz | (Spain) Luis Moya | Toyota Celica GT-Four ST165 | Toyota Team Europe |
| 1991 | (Australia) Ross Dunkerton | (Lithuania) Fred Gocentas | Mitsubishi Galant VR-4 | |
| 1992 | (Australia) Ross Dunkerton | (Lithuania) Fred Gocentas | Mitsubishi Galant VR-4 | Mitsubishi Ralliart |
| 1993 | (New Zealand) Possum Bourne | (New Zealand) Rodger Freeth | Subaru Legacy RS | Subaru 555 World Rally Team |
| 1994 | (New Zealand) Possum Bourne | (New Zealand) Tony Sircombe | Subaru Impreza 555 | Subaru 555 World Rally Team |
| 1995 | (Sweden) Kenneth Eriksson | (Sweden) Staffan Parmander | Mitsubishi Lancer Evolution III | Mitsubishi Ralliart |
| 1996 | (Sweden) Kenneth Eriksson | (Sweden) Staffan Parmander | Subaru Impreza 555 | Subaru 555 World Rally Team |
| 1997 | (Sweden) Kenneth Eriksson | (Sweden) Staffan Parmander | Subaru Impreza WRC | Subaru 555 World Rally Team |
| 1998 | (Japan) Yoshio Fujimoto | (New Zealand) Tony Sircombe | Toyota Corolla WRC | Tein Sport |
| 1999 | (Japan) Katsuhiko Taguchi | (Malaysia) Ron Teoh | Mitsubishi Lancer Evolution VI | Mitsubishi Ralliart Malaysia |
| 2000 | (New Zealand) Possum Bourne | (Australia) Mark Stacey | Subaru Impreza WRX / Subaru Impreza S4 WRC | Possum Bourne Motorsport |
| 2001 | (Malaysia) Karamjit Singh | (Malaysia) Allen Oh | Proton PERT | Proton Eon Rally Team |
| 2002 | (Malaysia) Karamjit Singh | (Malaysia) Allen Oh | Proton PERT | Proton Eon Rally Team |
| 2003 | (Germany) Armin Kremer | (Germany) Fred Berssen | Mitsubishi Lancer Evolution VII | MRF Racing |
| 2004 | (Malaysia) Karamjit Singh | (Malaysia) Allen Oh | Proton PERT | Proton Eon Rally Team |
| 2005 | (Finland) Jussi Välimäki | (Finland) Jarkko Kalliolepo | Mitsubishi Lancer Evolution VIII | MRF Racing |
| 2006 | (Australia) Cody Crocker | (Australia) Benjamin Atkinson | Subaru Impreza WRX STI | Les Walkden Racing |
| 2007 | (Australia) Cody Crocker | (Australia) Benjamin Atkinson | Subaru Impreza WRX STI | Motor Image Rally Team |
| 2008 | (Australia) Cody Crocker | (Australia) Benjamin Atkinson | Subaru Impreza WRX STI | Motor Image Rally Team |
| 2009 | (Australia) Cody Crocker | (Australia) Benjamin Atkinson | Subaru Impreza WRX STI | Motor Image Rally Team |
| 2010 | (Japan) Katsuhiko Taguchi | (Australia) Mark Stacey | Mitsubishi Lancer Evolution X | MRF Racing |
| 2011 | (United Kingdom) Alister McRae | (Australia) Bill Hayes | Proton Satria Neo S2000 | Proton Motorsport |
| 2012 | (Australia) Chris Atkinson | (Belgium) Stéphane Prévot | Škoda Fabia S2000 | MRF Racing |
| 2013 | (India) Gaurav Gill | (Australia) Glenn Macneall | Škoda Fabia S2000 | MRF Racing |
| 2014 | (Czech Republic) Jan Kopecký | (Czech Republic) Pavel Dresler | Škoda Fabia S2000 | MRF Racing |
| 2015 | (Sweden) Pontus Tidemand | (Sweden) Emil Axelsson | Škoda Fabia S2000 | MRF Racing |
| 2016 | (India) Gaurav Gill | (Australia) Glenn Macneall | Škoda Fabia R5 | MRF Racing |
| 2017 | (India) Gaurav Gill | (Belgium) Stéphane Prévot | Škoda Fabia R5 | MRF Racing |
| 2018 | (Japan) Yūya Sumiyama | (Japan) Takahiro Yasui | Škoda Fabia R5 | Cusco Racing |
| 2019 | (Chinese Taipei) Lin De-wei | (China) Le Kepeng | Subaru XV | Subaru Rally Team China |
| 2020 — 2021 | Not held due to COVID-19 pandemic | | | |
| 2022 | (New Zealand) Hayden Paddon | (New Zealand) John Kennard | Hyundai i20 AP4 | Hyundai New Zealand |
| 2023 | (Indonesia) Rifat Sungkar | (Australia) Ben Searcy | Škoda Fabia R5/Rally2 evo | LFN Sederhana Motorsport |
| 2024 | (New Zealand) Hayden Paddon | (New Zealand) Jared Hudson | Hyundai i20 N Rally2 | |

=== Asia Cup ===
| Season | Champion | Car | Team |
|---|---|---|---|
| 2008 | (Australia) Cody Crocker | Subaru Impreza WRX STI | Motor Image Rally Team |
| 2009 | (Australia) Cody Crocker | Subaru Impreza WRX STI | Motor Image Rally Team |
| 2010 | (Japan) Yūya Sumiyama | Mitsubishi Lancer Evolution X | |
| 2011 | (United Kingdom) Alister McRae | Proton Satria Neo S2000 | Proton Motorsport |
| 2012 | (Japan) Yūya Sumiyama | Subaru Impreza WRX STi | |
| 2013 | (New Zealand) Michael Young | Toyota Vitz | Cusco Racing |
| 2014 | (Japan) Yuya Sumiyama | Subaru Impreza WRX STi | |
| 2015 | (Japan) Hitoshi Takayama | Subaru Impreza WRX STi | |
| 2016 | (India) Gaurav Gill | Škoda Fabia R5 | MRF Racing |
| 2017 | (India) Gaurav Gill | Škoda Fabia R5 | MRF Racing |
| 2018 | (Japan) Yūya Sumiyama | Škoda Fabia R5 | Cusco Racing |
| 2019 | (New Zealand) Michael Young | Toyota C-HR | Cusco Racing |
| 2020 | Not held | | |
| 2021 | Not held | | |
| 2022 | Not held | | |
| 2023 | (Indonesia) Rahmat | Hyundai i20 N Rally2 | LFN Sederhana Motorsport |

=== Pacific Cup ===
| Season | Champion | Car | Team |
|---|---|---|---|
| 2008 | (Australia) Dean Herridge | Subaru Impreza WRX STI | Cusco Racing |
| 2009 | (New Zealand) Hayden Paddon | Subaru Impreza WRX STI; Mitsubishi Lancer Evo IX | Team Green |
| 2010 | (Australia) Brendan Reeves | Subaru Impreza WRX STI | |
| 2011 | (Australia) Chris Atkinson | Proton Satria Neo S2000 | Proton Motorsport |
| 2012 | (Australia) Chris Atkinson | Škoda Fabia S2000 | MRF Racing |
| 2013 | (Australia) Simon Knowles | Mitsubishi Lancer Evolution IX | |
| 2014 | (Czech Republic) Jan Kopecký | Škoda Fabia S2000 | MRF Racing |
| 2015 | (Sweden) Pontus Tidemand | Škoda Fabia S2000 | MRF Racing |
| 2016 | (Germany) Fabian Kreim | Škoda Fabia R5 | MRF Racing |
| 2017 | (Norway) Ole Christian Veiby | Škoda Fabia R5 | MRF Racing |
| 2018 | (Italy) Fabio Frisiero | Peugeot 208 AP4 | |
| 2019 | (New Zealand) Hayden Paddon | Hyundai i20 AP4 | Paddon Rallysport |

=== Group N ===
| Season | Champion | Car |
|---|---|---|
| 1996 | (Japan) Yoshihiro Kataoka | Mitsubishi Lancer Evolution III |
| 1997 | (Malaysia) Karamjit Singh | Proton Wira |
| 1998 | (Australia) Michael Guest | Subaru Impreza WRX |
| 1999 | (Japan) Katsuhiko Taguchi | Mitsubishi Lancer Evolution VI |
| 2000 | (Malaysia) Karamjit Singh | Proton Pert |
| 2001 | (Malaysia) Karamjit Singh | Proton Pert |
| 2002 | (Italy) Nico Caldarola | Mitsubishi Lancer Evolution VII |
| 2003 | (Germany) Armin Kremer | Mitsubishi Lancer Evolution VII |

=== 2 Litre ===
| Season | Champion | Car |
|---|---|---|
| 1996 | (Japan) Nobuhiro Tajima | Suzuki Baleno; Suzuki Swift |
| 1997 | (Japan) Nobuhiro Tajima | Suzuki Baleno |
| 1998 | (Japan) Nobuhiro Tajima | Suzuki Baleno |
| 1999 | (Sweden) Kenneth Eriksson (United Kingdom) Alister McRae | Hyundai Coupe; Hyundai Coupe |
| 2000 | (Australia) Simon Evans | Volkswagen Golf |
| 2001 | (Japan) Nobuhiro Tajima | Suzuki Ignis |
| 2002 | (Japan) Nobuhiro Tajima | Suzuki Ignis |

=== Manufacturers ===
| Season | Manufacturer |
|---|---|
| 1996 | (Japan) Mitsubishi |
| 1997 | (Japan) Subaru |
| 1998 | (Japan) Toyota |
| 1999 | (Japan) Mitsubishi |
| 2000 | (Japan) Subaru |
| 2001 | (Japan) Mitsubishi |
| 2002 | (Malaysia) Proton |
| 2003 | (Japan) Mitsubishi |
| 2004 | (Malaysia) Proton |
| 2005 | (Japan) Mitsubishi |
| 2006 | (Japan) Subaru |
| 2007 | (Japan) Subaru |
| 2008 | (Japan) Subaru |
| 2009 | (Japan) Subaru |
| 2010 | (Japan) Mitsubishi |
| 2011 | (Malaysia) Proton |
| 2012 | (Czech Republic) Škoda |
| 2013 | (Czech Republic) Škoda |
| 2014 | (Czech Republic) Škoda |
| 2015 | (Czech Republic) Škoda |
| 2016 | (Czech Republic) Škoda |
| 2017 | (Czech Republic) Škoda |
| 2018 | (Czech Republic) Škoda |
| 2019 | No Award |

== See also ==
- Middle East Rally Championship
- Asia Road Racing Championship
