= 2005 Asia-Pacific Rally Championship =

2005 Asia-Pacific Rally season

Seasons
- ← 2004 2006 →

The 2005 Asia-Pacific Rally Championship season (APRC) was an international rally championship organized by the FIA. The champion was Finnish driver Jussi Valimaki.

== Calendar ==
Round	Date	Event	Winner
1	April 2–4	(Australia) Rally of Canberra	(Finland) Jussi Valimaki
1	May 20–22	(France) Rallye de Nouvelle Calédonie	(Finland) Jussi Valimaki
2	June 17–19	(New Zealand) Rally of Rotorua	(Japan) Toshi Arai
3	July 22–24	(Japan) Rally Hokkaido	(Japan) Katsu Taguchi
4	August 19–21	(Malaysia) Malaysian Rally	(Japan) Toshi Arai
5	September 9–11	Rally Indonesia	(Finland) Jussi Valimaki
6	October 21–23	Rally of Thailand	(Finland) Jussi Valimaki
7	November 25–27	China Rally	(Malaysia) Kan Chee Hong

== Points ==
Position	Driver	Points
1	(Finland) Jussi Valimaki	87
2	(Japan) Toshi Arai	47
=	(New Zealand) Geof Argyle	47
4	(Malaysia) Kan Chee Hong	46
5	(Japan) Katsu Taguchi	37
6	(New Zealand) Dermott Malley	30
7	(New Zealand) Brian Green	29
8	(China) Fan Fan	14
9	(Japan) Mitsuhro Kunisawa	13
10	(France) Julien Lenglet	4
