= 2000 Asia-Pacific Rally Championship =

2000 Asia-Pacific Rally season

Seasons
- ← 1999 2001 →

The 2000 Asia-Pacific Rally Championship season was an international rally championship organized by the FIA. New Zealander Possum Bourne won his third and final APRC title driving a Subaru Impreza WRX.

== Calendar ==
Round	Event	Winner
1	Rally Indonesia	(Malaysia) Karamjit Singh
2	(Australia) Rally of Canberra	(New Zealand) Possum Bourne
3	Rally New Zealand	(Norway) Petter Solberg
4	Rally of China	(New Zealand) Possum Bourne
5	Rally of Malaysia	(New Zealand) Possum Bourne
6	Rally of Thailand	(Malaysia) Karamjit Singh

== Entries ==
Entrant	Manufacturer	Model	Tyre	Driver	Co-Driver	Class	Rounds
	Mitsubishi						
	Proton						
	Subaru						
	Toyota						
