= 2002 Asia-Pacific Rally Championship =

2002 Asia-Pacific Rally season

Seasons
- ← 2001 2003 →

The 2002 Asia-Pacific Rally Championship season (APRC) was an international rally championship organized by the FIA. The champion was Malaysian driver Karamjit Singh.

== Calendar ==
Round	Date	Event	Winner
1	May 3–5	(Australia) Rally of Canberra	(Italy) Nico Caldarola
2	May 31-Jun 2	(France) Rallye de Nouvelle-Calédonie	(Malaysia) Karamjit Singh
3	June 27–30	(New Zealand) Rally of Rotorua	(Malaysia) Karamjit Singh
4	September 6–8	(Japan) Rally Hokkaido	(New Zealand) Possum Bourne
5	October 19–21	Rally of China	(Malaysia) Karamjit Singh
6	Nov 29-Dec 1	Rally of Thailand	(Italy) Nico Caldarola

== Points ==
Position	Driver	Points
1	(Malaysia) Karamjit Singh	70
2	(Italy) Nico Caldarola	48
3	(New Zealand) Stuart Warren	25
=	(New Zealand) Reece Jones	25
5	(New Zealand) Possum Bourne	24
6	(United Kingdom) John Lloyd	14
=	(Malaysia) Saladin Mazlan	14
8	(France) Jean-Louis Leyraud	9
9	(New Zealand) Brian Green	8
=	(New Zealand) Andrew Hawkeswood	8
11	(Kenya) Alastair Cavenagh	4
