= 2016 Asia-Pacific Rally Championship =

2016 Asia-Pacific Rally season

Seasons
- ← 2015 2017 →

The 2016 Asia-Pacific Rally Championship season is an international rally championship sanctioned by the FIA. The championship will be contested by a combination of regulations with Group N competing directly against Super 2000 cars for points.

The championship will begin in New Zealand on 29 April and conclude in India on 11 December.

== Event calendar and results ==
The 2016 APRC is as follows:

Round	Rally name	Podium finishers				Statistics			
Round	Rally name	Rank	Driver	Car	Time	Stages	Length	Starters	Finishers
1	(New Zealand) International Rally of Whangarei (29 April–1 May)	1	(India) Gaurav Gill	Škoda Fabia R5	2:55:50.3	16	275.18 km	51	16
1	(New Zealand) International Rally of Whangarei (29 April–1 May)	2	(Germany) Fabian Kreim	Škoda Fabia R5	2:56:20.7	16	275.18 km	51	16
1	(New Zealand) International Rally of Whangarei (29 April–1 May)	3	(New Zealand) Michael Young	Subaru Impreza WRX STi	3:10:00.3	16	275.18 km	51	16
2	(Australia) International Rally of Queensland (17–19 June)	1	(India) Gaurav Gill	Škoda Fabia R5	1:43:45.3	20	219.79 km	40	31
2	(Australia) International Rally of Queensland (17–19 June)	2	(Germany) Fabian Kreim	Škoda Fabia R5	1:45:44.9	20	219.79 km	40	31
2	(Australia) International Rally of Queensland (17–19 June)	3	(New Zealand) Michael Young	Subaru Impreza WRX STi	1:46:31.0	20	219.79 km	40	31
3	(China) Zhangye Rally (5–7 August)	1	(Australia) Chris Atkinson	Volkswagen Golf SCRC	2:08:56.7	9	236.36 km	130	70
3	(China) Zhangye Rally (5–7 August)	2	(Austria) Manfred Stohl	Citroën DS3 R5	2:12:22.3	9	236.36 km	130	70
3	(China) Zhangye Rally (5–7 August)	3	(China) Han Han	Subaru XV	2:14:56.5	9	236.36 km	130	70
4	(Japan) Rally Hokkaido (23–25 September)	1	(India) Gaurav Gill	Škoda Fabia R5	2:00:23.9	18	198.68 km	19	13
4	(Japan) Rally Hokkaido (23–25 September)	2	(Germany) Fabian Kreim	Škoda Fabia R5	2:02:14.5	18	198.68 km	19	13
4	(Japan) Rally Hokkaido (23–25 September)	3	(New Zealand) Michael Young	Subaru Impreza WRX STi	2:04:18.3	18	198.68 km	19	13
5	(Malaysia) Malaysian Rally (29–30 October)	1	(India) Gaurav Gill	Škoda Fabia R5	2:48:22.5	14	208.06 km	25	18
5	(Malaysia) Malaysian Rally (29–30 October)	2	(Finland) Jari Ketomaa	Mitsubishi Mirage R5	2:57:32.7	14	208.06 km	25	18
5	(Malaysia) Malaysian Rally (29–30 October)	3	(Japan) Yuya Sumiyama	Subaru Impreza WRX STi	3:06:23.8	14	208.06 km	25	18
6	Rally of India (3-5 December)	1	(India) Gaurav Gill	Škoda Fabia R5	3:39:37.9	17	225.26 km	50	
6	Rally of India (3-5 December)	2	(New Zealand) Mike Young	Subaru Impreza WRX STi	3:51:10.3	17	225.26 km	50	
6	Rally of India (3-5 December)	3	(India) Sanjay Takale	Subaru Impreza WRX STi	4:03:51.0	17	225.26 km	50	
