= International Rally of Whangarei =

The International Rally of Whangārei is a rallying event held in Whangārei, New Zealand. The first event was run in 2007 replacing the International Rally of Rotorua as New Zealand's round of the Asia Pacific Rally Championship (APRC). With the World Rally Championship's move to a rotational calendar means that the International Rally of Whangārei becomes in the years Rally New Zealand is not held, New Zealand largest rally event. The rally also hosts a round of the New Zealand Rally Championship. While originally being a late season event, today it is held in May and is the season opening event in the APRC. The rally has been sponsored by automotive lighting manufacturer Hella for most of the events history but is now unsponsored.

The Whangārei area, in the northernmost part of New Zealand's North Island, is a former host of Rally New Zealand. The event has had remarkably few winners over its history with local driver Hayden Paddon having won seven editions, whereas Indian Gaurav Gill has won three times and Australian Chris Atkinson has won twice.

The first event saw Paddon take victory after a rally-long battle with Cody Crocker. The following year former New Zealand champion Chris West took victory over Paddon and Crocker. Paddon defeated Crocker again in 2009 and took his third victory in 2010 over Emma Gilmour. 2011 was the first time the rally was won by a non-local with Chris Atkinson winning over Paddon. Atkinson won again in 2012 ahead of Per-Gunnar Andersson. 2013 saw Paddon take his fourth win ahead of Esapekka Lappi.

== Winners ==
Year	Driver	Co-Driver	Car
2007	(New Zealand) Hayden Paddon	(New Zealand) John Kennard	Mitsubishi Lancer Evo VIII
2008	(New Zealand) Chris West	(New Zealand) Garry Cowan	Mitsubishi Lancer Evo IX
2009	(New Zealand) Hayden Paddon	(New Zealand) John Kennard	Mitsubishi Lancer Evo IX
2010	(New Zealand) Hayden Paddon	(New Zealand) John Kennard	Mitsubishi Lancer Evo IX
2011	(Australia) Chris Atkinson	(Belgium) Stephane Prevot	Proton Satria Neo S2000
2012	(Australia) Chris Atkinson	(Belgium) Stephane Prevot	Škoda Fabia S2000
2013	(New Zealand) Hayden Paddon	(New Zealand) John Kennard	Mitsubishi Lancer Evo IX
2014	(India) Gaurav Gill	(Australia) Glenn Macneall	Škoda Fabia S2000
2015	(United States) Ken Block	(Italy) Alex Gelsomino	Ford Fiesta S2000
2016	(India) Gaurav Gill	(Australia) Glenn Macneall	Škoda Fabia R5
2017	(India) Gaurav Gill	(Australia) Glenn Macneall	Škoda Fabia R5
2018	(New Zealand) Hayden Paddon	(New Zealand) Mal Peden	Hyundai i20 AP4+
2019	(New Zealand) Hayden Paddon	(New Zealand) Samantha Gray	Hyundai i20 AP4+
2020	Cancelled		
2021	(New Zealand) Hayden Paddon	(New Zealand) John Kennard	Hyundai i20 AP4+
2026	(New Zealand) Jack Hawkeswood	(New Zealand) Jason Farmer	Toyota GR Yaris Rally2
