= 2014 Asia-Pacific Rally Championship =

Seasons
- ← 2013 2015 →

The 2014 Asia-Pacific Rally Championship season was an international rally championship sanctioned by the FIA. The championship was contested by a combination of regulations with Group N competing directly against Super 2000 cars for points.

The championship began in New Zealand on 11 April and concluded in China on 9 November. The Asia Cup sub-championship had been due to continue to a 7 December finish in Thailand, but this event was cancelled. The championship was held over six events with a candidate event included as part of the Asia Cup. A second candidate event in India was scheduled to be held in India but proximity of local parliamentary elections restricted the event's ability to upgrade competitive stages within the timeframe allowed by the early season. The rally was rescheduled until the end of the local season and its APRC status removed.

The championship was won by European champion Jan Kopecký driving a Team MRF prepared Škoda Fabia. Kopecký wrapped up the championship early after his victory at Rally Hokkaido, the third of his four victories in the six-event season. Defending champion Gaurav Gill won the other two rallies and held second in the championship until the final rally. Two late season failures allowed him to be overtaken by New Zealand Proton driver Michael Young. Škoda won the manufacturers championship from Mitsubishi. Team MRF – with drivers Kopecký and Gill – won all six rallies, winning the teams title from Japanese Subaru team Cusco Racing.

Kopecký won the Pacific Cup in dominant fashion with almost double the points of his nearest competitors. Young and Australian Mitsubishi driver Mark Pedder tied for second, with Young being awarded the runners up position on countback.

Japanese Subaru driver Yuya Sumiyama won the Asia Cup, finishing 50 points clear of Sri Lankan Subaru driver Dinesh Deheragoda. Gill faded to fourth in the Asia Cup after failing to finish at Rally Hokkaido and Rally China Longyou.

== Selected entries ==
Icon	Cup
A	Asia Cup
P	Pacific Cup

Constructor	Car	Team	Driver	Co-driver	Cup	Class	Rounds
Škoda	Škoda Fabia S2000	(India) Team MRF	(India) Gaurav Gill	(Australia) Glenn MacNeall		RC2	All
Škoda	Škoda Fabia S2000	(India) Team MRF	(Czech Republic) Jan Kopecký	(Czech Republic) Pavel Dresler	P	RC2	All
Škoda	Škoda Fabia S2000	(China) Young Motorsport TS Club	(China) Jun Xu	(China) Sheng Liu		RC2	1, 3–5
Mitsubishi	Mitsubishi Lancer Evo X	(Australia) Pedders Suspension	(Australia) Mark Pedder	(Australia) Claire Ryan	P	RC2	1–4
Mitsubishi	Mitsubishi Lancer Evo X	(Australia) Pedders Suspension	(Australia) Mark Pedder	(Australia) Dale Moscatt	P	RC2	6
Renault	Renault Clio R3	(Australia) Pedders Suspension	(Australia) Tom Wilde	(Australia) Bill Hayes		RC3	1–2
Renault	Renault Clio R3	(Australia) Pedders Suspension	(Australia) Tom Wilde	(Australia) Anthony McLoughlin		RC3	3
Proton	Proton Satria Neo	(Japan) Cusco Racing	(New Zealand) Michael Young	(Australia) Erin Kelly		RC3	1
Proton	Proton Satria Neo	(Japan) Cusco Racing	(New Zealand) Michael Young	(Australia) Malcolm Read		RC3	2–6
Subaru	Subaru Impreza WRX STI	(Japan) Cusco Racing	(India) Sanjay Takale	(Malaysia) Sean Gregory		RC2	1–5

== Event calendar and results ==
The 2014 APRC was as follows:

Round	Rally name	Podium finishers				Statistics			
Round	Rally name	Rank	Driver	Car	Time	Stages	Length	Starters	Finishers
1	(New Zealand) International Rally of Whangarei (11–13 April)	1	(India) Gaurav Gill	Škoda Fabia S2000	2:11:39.7	14	220.87 km	48	25
1	(New Zealand) International Rally of Whangarei (11–13 April)	2	(New Zealand) Richard Mason	Subaru Impreza WRX STi	2:11:50.9	14	220.87 km	48	25
1	(New Zealand) International Rally of Whangarei (11–13 April)	3	(Czech Republic) Jan Kopecký	Škoda Fabia S2000	2:11:51.6	14	220.87 km	48	25
-	Rally of India (26–27 April)	event cancelled							
2	(France) Rallye de Nouvelle-Calédonie (16–18 May)	1	(France) Emmanuel Guigou	Renault Clio R3	2:08:10.8	17	144.09 km	26	13
2	(France) Rallye de Nouvelle-Calédonie (16–18 May)	2	(France) Patrick Christian	Mitsubishi Lancer Evo IX	2:13:43.8	17	144.09 km	26	13
2	(France) Rallye de Nouvelle-Calédonie (16–18 May)	3	(France) Claude Clavel	Mitsubishi Lancer Evo IX	2:16:40.1	17	144.09 km	26	13
3	(Australia) International Rally of Queensland (20–22 June)	1	(Czech Republic) Jan Kopecký	Škoda Fabia S2000	2:20:09.1	15	222.30 km	51	28
3	(Australia) International Rally of Queensland (20–22 June)	2	(Australia) Scott Pedder	Renault Clio R3	2:21:18.4	15	222.30 km	51	28
3	(Australia) International Rally of Queensland (20–22 June)	3	(Australia) Brendan Reeves	Mazda 2	2:23:21.1	15	222.30 km	51	28
4	(Malaysia) Malaysian Rally (15–17 August)	1	(India) Gaurav Gill	Škoda Fabia S2000	3:01:23.2	14	217.40 km	33	30
4	(Malaysia) Malaysian Rally (15–17 August)	2	(Japan) Yuya Sumiyama	Subaru Impreza WRX STi	3:12:14.5	14	217.40 km	33	30
4	(Malaysia) Malaysian Rally (15–17 August)	3	(Australia) Mark Pedder	Mitsubishi Lancer Evo X	3:14:25.7	14	217.40 km	33	30
5	(Japan) Rally Hokkaido (26–28 September)	1	(Czech Republic) Jan Kopecký	Škoda Fabia S2000	2:12:29.5	18	222.80 km	25	19
5	(Japan) Rally Hokkaido (26–28 September)	2	(Japan) Toshihiro Arai	Subaru Impreza WRX STi	2:13:11.8	18	222.80 km	25	19
5	(Japan) Rally Hokkaido (26–28 September)	3	(Japan) Hiroshi Yanagisawa	Subaru Impreza WRX STi	2:16:09.2	18	222.80 km	25	19
6	Rally China Longyou (7–9 November)	1	(Australia) Chris Atkinson	Volkswagen Golf SCRC	2:51:56.0	13	230.92 km	110	46
6	Rally China Longyou (7–9 November)	2	(Czech Republic) Jan Kopecký	Škoda Fabia S2000	2:57:10.3	13	230.92 km	110	46
6	Rally China Longyou (7–9 November)	3	(Japan) Yuya Sumiyama	Subaru Impreza WRX STi	3:01:07.5	13	230.92 km	110	46
-	Thailand Rally (5–7 December)	event cancelled							

== Championship standings ==
The 2014 APRC for Drivers points was as follows:

Pos.	Driver	Vehicle	(New Zealand) NZL	(France) NCL	(Australia) AUS	(Malaysia) MAL	(Japan) JPN	(China) CHN	Total
1	(Czech Republic) Jan Kopecký	Škoda Fabia S2000	2 ^{13}	1 ^{10}	1 ^{14}	Ret ^{7}	1 ^{14}	1 ^{14}	190
2	(New Zealand) Michael Young	Proton Satria Neo	6 ^{4}	3 ^{9}	5 ^{6}	5 ^{5}	4 ^{9}	2 ^{12}	118
3	(India) Gaurav Gill	Škoda Fabia S2000	1 ^{13}	2 ^{10}	Ret	1 ^{13}	Ret	Ret	104
4	(China) Xu Jun	Škoda Fabia S2000	5 ^{7}		3 ^{10}	3 ^{10}	2 ^{12}		97
5	(Australia) Mark Pedder	Mitsubishi Lancer Evo X	3 ^{10}	Ret ^{7}	2 ^{12}	2 ^{10}		Ret	90
6	(India) Sanjay Takale	Subaru Impreza WRX STi	7 ^{2}	Ret ^{5}	6 ^{4}	4 ^{7}	3 ^{9}		68
7	(Australia) Tom Wilde	Renault Clio R3	4 ^{7}	Ret ^{6}	4 ^{8}				45

Key
Colour	Result
Gold	Winner
Silver	2nd place
Bronze	3rd place
Green	Points finish
Blue	Non-points finish
Blue	Non-classified finish (NC)
Purple	Did not finish (Ret)
Black	Excluded (EX)
Black	Disqualified (DSQ)
White	Did not start (DNS)
White	Cancelled (C)
Blank	Withdrew entry from the event (WD)

Note: ^{1} – ^{12} refers to the bonus points awarded for each leg of the rally for the first five place getters, 1st (7), 2nd (5), 3rd (3), 4th (2), 5th (1). There were two bonus legs for each rally.

=== Pacific Cup ===
Pos.	Driver	Vehicle	(New Zealand) NZL	(France) NCL	(Australia) AUS	Total
1	(Czech Republic) Jan Kopecký	Škoda Fabia S2000	1 ^{14}	1 ^{11}	1 ^{14}	114
2	(New Zealand) Michael Young	Proton Satria Neo	4 ^{8}	2 ^{11}	4 ^{4}	65
3	(Australia) Mark Pedder	Mitsubishi Lancer Evo X	2 ^{12}	Ret ^{7}	2 ^{10}	65
4	(Australia) Tom Wilde	Renault Clio R3	3 ^{10}	Ret ^{6}	3 ^{6}	46

=== Asia Cup ===
Pos.	Driver	Vehicle	(Malaysia) MAL	(Japan) JPN	(China) CHN	Total
1	(Japan) Yuya Sumiyama	Subaru Impreza WRX STi	2 ^{11}	1 ^{14}	1 ^{14}	107
2	(Sri Lanka) Dinesh Deheragoda	Mitsubishi Lancer Evo X	6 ^{3}	5 ^{6}	2 ^{12}	57
3	(China) Jun Xu	Škoda Fabia S2000	3 ^{10}	2 ^{12}		56
4	(India) Sanjay Takale	Subaru Impreza WRX STi	5 ^{7}	3 ^{10}		42
5	(India) Gaurav Gill	Škoda Fabia S2000	1 ^{14}	Ret	Ret	39
6	(Japan) Tomohide Hasegawa	Mitsubishi Lancer Evo IX	7 ^{3}	4 ^{8}		29
7	(Japan) Mitsuhiro Kunisawa	Subaru Impreza WRX STi	4 ^{7}			19
