= 2018 Asia-Pacific Rally Championship =

Motorsport championship

The 2018 Asia-Pacific Rally Championship season is an international rally championship sanctioned by the FIA. It is being held for the 31st time. The championship was contested by a combination of regulations with Group R competing directly against Super 2000 cars for points.

The championship began in New Zealand on 4 May and is scheduled to finish in China on 21 October after five rallies. A sixth event in India in December was cancelled.

== Selected entries ==
Constructor	Car	Team	Driver	Co-Driver	Rounds
Toyota	Toyota Vitz AP4	(Japan) Cusco Racing	(New Zealand) Michael Young	(New Zealand) Malcolm Read	1, 3–5
Toyota	Toyota Vitz AP4	(Japan) Cusco Racing	(New Zealand) Michael Young	(Australia) Scott Beckwith	2
Toyota	Toyota Vitz AP4	(Australia) Neal Bates Motorsport	(Australia) Harry Bates	(Australia) John McCarthy	2
Škoda	Škoda Fabia R5	(Japan) Cusco Racing	(Japan) Yuya Sumiyama	(Japan) Takahiro Yasui	All
Škoda	Škoda Fabia R5	(Australia) Race Torque Engineering	(Australia) Eli Evans	(Australia) Ben Searcy	2
Škoda	Škoda Fabia R5	(Australia) Race Torque Engineering	(Australia) Adrian Coppin	(Australia) Glen Weston	2
Peugeot	Peugeot 208 AP4	(Australia) Race Torque Engineering	(Italy) Fabio Frisiero	(Italy) Simone Scattolin	1
Peugeot	Peugeot 208 AP4	(Australia) Race Torque Engineering	(Italy) Fabio Frisiero	(Spain) Jordi Barrabés	2
Peugeot	Peugeot 208 AP4	(Australia) Race Torque Engineering	(Italy) Fabio Frisiero	(Italy) Carlo Cassina	4
Subaru	Subaru Impreza WRX STI	(Japan) Ahresty Rally Team	(Japan) Fuyuhiko Takahashi	(Japan) Mitsuo Nakamura	1
Subaru	Subaru Impreza WRX STI	(Japan) Ahresty Rally Team	(Japan) Fuyuhiko Takahashi	(Japan) Masami Nakata	4
Subaru	Subaru Impreza WRX STI	(India) R3A PGA Motorsports	(India) Abhilash Pallath Ganesh	(India) Musa Sherif	3
Subaru	Subaru Impreza WRX STI	(Japan) Streetlife World Rally Team	(Japan) Masaki Yamada	(Japan) Tatsuro Yoshimochi	4
Subaru	Subaru Impreza WRX STI	(Japan) Cusco Racing	(Japan) Yasushi Aoyama	(Japan) Noriko Takeshita	4
Subaru	Subaru Impreza WRX STI	(Japan) Team Has Rally	(Japan) Yasunori Hagiwara	(Japan) Shizue Haraguchi	4
Subaru	Subaru WRX STI	(New Zealand) Ben Hunt Motorsport	(New Zealand) Ben Hunt	(New Zealand) Tony Rawstorn	1
Subaru	Subaru WRX STI	(Australia) Contel Communications	(Australia) Steve Glenney	(Australia) Andrew Sarandis	2
Subaru	Subaru WRX STI	(Australia) Les Walkden Racing	(Australia) Molly Taylor	(Australia) Malcolm Read	2
Subaru	Subaru WRX STI	Subaru Rally Team China	(China) Ziwei Hou	(China) Xin Shen	5
Subaru	Subaru WRX STI	Subaru Rally Team China	(China) Yang Wang	(China) Qingkai Chen	5
Subaru	Subaru XV	Subaru Rally Team China	(China) Gaoxiang Fan	(China) Cailei Yue	5
Subaru	Subaru XV	Subaru Rally Team China	(Taiwan) Dawei Lin	(China) Kepeng Le	5
Hyundai	Hyundai i20 AP4	Hyundai New Zealand	(New Zealand) Hayden Paddon	(New Zealand) Malcolm Peden	1
Ford	Ford Fiesta R5	(New Zealand) Neil Allport Motorsport	(Australia) Nathan Quinn	(New Zealand) David Calder	1
Mitsubishi	Mitsubishi Lancer Evo X	(Japan) Super Alex Troop	(Japan) Atsushi Masumura	(Japan) Naoya Tanaka	2
Mitsubishi	Mitsubishi Lancer Evo X	(Japan) Super Alex Troop	(Japan) Atsushi Masumura	(Japan) Hiroshi Suzuki	4
Mitsubishi	Mitsubishi Lancer Evo X	(Japan) Immens Motorsport	(Japan) Mitsuhiro Aoki	(Japan) Shigeru Ikeda	4
Mitsubishi	Mitsubishi Lancer Evo X	(Japan) Hasepro Racing	(Japan) Tomohide Hasegawa	(Japan) Yasuyuki Atsuji	4
Mitsubishi	Mitsubishi Lancer Evo X	(Japan) Rstakada World Rally Team	(Japan) Futoshi Murase	(Japan) Hiroaki Miyabe	4
Mitsubishi	Mitsubishi Lancer Evo IX	(Japan) Streetlife World Rally Team	(Japan) Eiichi Iwashita	(Japan) Masahiko Nabekura	4
Mitsubishi	Mitsubishi Lancer Evo IX	(Japan) MD – World Rally Team	(Japan) Masahiko Miyamoto	(Japan) Kazuto Suzuki	4
Mitsubishi	Mitsubishi Lancer Evo IX	(Japan) Kumi-Vicic	(Japan) Kumiko Koide	(Japan) Tadayuki Akima	4
Mitsubishi	Mitsubishi Lancer Evo VIII	(Japan) Streetlife World Rally Team	(Japan) Takashi Mori	(Japan) Takumi Takahashi	4
Proton	Proton Satria Neo	(Malaysia) 23 Motors	(Malaysia) Abdul Kaathir	(Indonesia) Tri Arjuna	3
Suzuki	Suzuki Swift Sport	(Japan) Wako's Rally Team	(Malaysia) Abdul Kaathir	(Malaysia) Kenneth Koh	4
Toyota	Toyota GT86	(Japan) Wako's Rally Team	(Japan) Toshihiro Inomata	(Japan) Shoichi Amako	4
Volkswagen	Volkswagen Golf SCRC	(China) FAW-Volkswagen Team	(Estonia) Karl Kruuda	(Australia) Dale Moscatt	5
Volkswagen	Volkswagen Golf SCRC	(China) FAW-Volkswagen Team	(China) De'an Chen	(China) Yan Wang	5
Volkswagen	Volkswagen Golf SCRC	(China) FAW-Volkswagen Team	(China) Guojing Li	(China) Yundong Zhang	5

== Event calendar and results ==
The 2018 APRC is as follows:

Round	Rally name	Podium finishers				Statistics			
Round	Rally name	Rank	Driver	Car	Time	Stages	Length	Starters	Finishers
1	(New Zealand) International Rally of Whangarei (4–6 May)	1	(New Zealand) Hayden Paddon	Hyundai i20 AP4	2:45:04.4	18	277.34 km	52	28
1	(New Zealand) International Rally of Whangarei (4–6 May)	2	(New Zealand) Ben Hunt	Subaru WRX STI	2:52:30.7	18	277.34 km	52	28
1	(New Zealand) International Rally of Whangarei (4–6 May)	3	(Australia) Nathan Quinn	Ford Fiesta R5	2:53:35.3	18	277.34 km	52	28
2	(Australia) National Capital Rally (1–3 June)	1	(Australia) Eli Evans	Škoda Fabia R5	2:41:23.7	15	242.89 km	25	18
2	(Australia) National Capital Rally (1–3 June)	2	(Australia) Adrian Coppin	Škoda Fabia R5	2:46:22.1	15	242.89 km	25	18
2	(Australia) National Capital Rally (1–3 June)	3	(Australia) Craig Brooks	Subaru WRX STI	2:47:37.2	15	242.89 km	25	18
3	(Malaysia) International Rally of Johor (20–22 July)	1	(Japan) Yuya Sumiyama	Škoda Fabia R5	3:22:07.2	12	234.40 km	33	31
3	(Malaysia) International Rally of Johor (20–22 July)	2	(New Zealand) Michael Young	Toyota Vitz AP4	3:23:30.3	12	234.40 km	33	31
3	(Malaysia) International Rally of Johor (20–22 July)	3	(Indonesia) Rahmat H.	Mitsubishi Lancer Evo VIII	3:46:12.1	12	234.40 km	33	31
4	(Japan) Rally Hokkaido (14–16 September)	1	(Japan) Yuya Sumiyama	Škoda Fabia R5	2:18:31.7	17	221.25 km	18	13
4	(Japan) Rally Hokkaido (14–16 September)	2	(Japan) Eiichi Iwashita	Mitsubishi Lancer Evo IX	2:27:51.9	17	221.25 km	18	13
4	(Japan) Rally Hokkaido (14–16 September)	3	(Japan) Yasushi Aoyama	Subaru Impreza WRX STI	2:29:42.8	17	221.25 km	18	13
5	Rally China Longyou (20-21 October)	1	(Estonia) Karl Kruuda	Volkswagen Golf SCRC	2:54:53.6	13	220.82 km	84	46
5	Rally China Longyou (20-21 October)	2	(China) De'an Chen	Volkswagen Golf SCRC	2:59:59.9	13	220.82 km	84	46
5	Rally China Longyou (20-21 October)	3	(China) Gaoxiang Fan	Subaru XV	3:01:21.4	13	220.82 km	84	46
-	Coffee Day India Rally (1-2 December)	event cancelled							

== Championship standings ==
The 2018 APRC for Drivers points was as follows:

Pos.	Driver	Vehicle	(New Zealand) NZL	(Australia) AUS	(Malaysia) MAL	(Japan) JPN	(China) CHN	Total
1	(Japan) Yuya Sumiyama	Škoda Fabia R5	1 ^{13}	1 ^{14}	1 ^{13}	1 ^{14}	1 ^{14}	193
2	(Italy) Fabio Frisiero	Peugeot 208 AP4	2 ^{13}	2 ^{6}		3 ^{9}		79
3	(New Zealand) Michael Young	Toyota Vitz AP4	Ret	Ret ^{6}	2 ^{13}	Ret	Ret	37
4	(Japan) Eiichi Iwashita	Mitsubishi Lancer Evolution IX				2 ^{11}		29
5	(India) Abhilash Pallath Ganesh	Subaru Impreza WRX STI			3 ^{5}			20
6	(Japan) Fuyuhiko Takahashi	Subaru Impreza WRX STI	Ret ^{5}			5 ^{3}		18
7	(Japan) Takashi Mori	Mitsubishi Lancer Evolution VIII				4 ^{3}		15
8	(Japan) Atsushi Masumura	Mitsubishi Lancer Evolution X		7		6 ^{6}		14
9	(Japan) Masaki Yamada	Subaru Impreza WRX STi				7 ^{2}		8
10	(Japan) Mitsuhiro Aoki	Mitsubishi Lancer Evolution X				8 ^{1}		5
11	(Japan) Masahiko Miyamoto	Mitsubishi Lancer Evolution IX				Ret ^{4}		4

Key
Colour	Result
Gold	Winner
Silver	2nd place
Bronze	3rd place
Green	Points finish
Blue	Non-points finish
Blue	Non-classified finish (NC)
Purple	Did not finish (Ret)
Black	Excluded (EX)
Black	Disqualified (DSQ)
White	Did not start (DNS)
White	Cancelled (C)
Blank	Withdrew entry from the event (WD)

Note: ^{1} – ^{14} refers to the bonus points awarded for each leg of the rally for the first five place getters, 1st (7), 2nd (5), 3rd (3), 4th (2), 5th (1). There were two bonus legs for each rally.
