= Nathan Quinn =

Australian rally driver

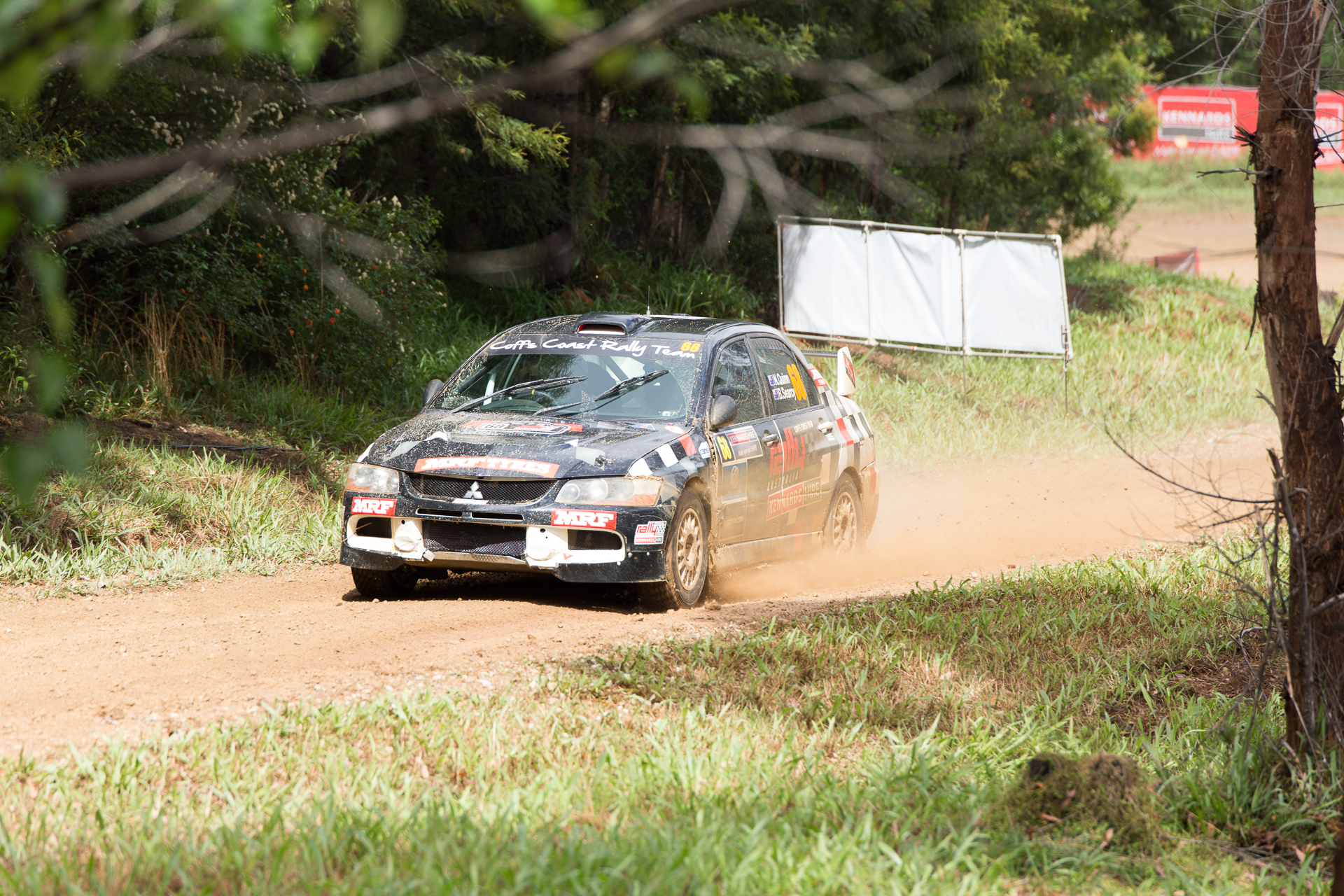

Personal information
- Nationality: Australian
- Born: 2 April 1986 (age 40); Coffs Harbour, New South Wales

World Rally Championship record
- Years active: 2013
- Co-driver: (Australia) Glenn MacNeall
- Teams: Motorsport Italia
- Rallies: 1
- Championships: 0
- Rally wins: 0
- Podiums: 0
- Stage wins: 0
- Total points: 4
- First rally: 2013 Rally Australia

Nathan Leslie Quinn (born 2 April 1986) is a rally driver from Australia. He won the Australian Rally Championship in 2017.

== Career results ==
=== Summary ===
| Season | Series | Position | Car | Team |
|---|---|---|---|---|
| 2008 | Australian Rally Championship | 9th | Mitsubishi Lancer Evo V | Nathan Quinn |
| 2009 | Australian Rally Championship | 17th | Mitsubishi Lancer Evo V Mitsubishi Lancer Evo IX | Nathan Quinn |
| 2010 | Australian Rally Championship | 11th | Mitsubishi Lancer Evo IX | Nathan Quinn |
| 2011 | Production World Rally Championship | 19th | Mitsubishi Lancer Evo IX | Coffs Coast Rally Team |
| 2012 | Asia-Pacific Rally Championship | NC | Mitsubishi Lancer Evo IX | Nathan Quinn |
| 2013 | World Rally Championship | 26th | Mini John Cooper Works WRC | Motorsport Italia |
| 2014 | Australian Rally Championship | NC | Peugeot 207 RC R3T | Nathan Quinn |
| 2015 | World Rally Championship-2 | 28th | Mitsubishi Lancer Evo X | Motorsport Italia |
| 2016 | Asia-Pacific Rally Championship | NC | Mitsubishi Lancer Evo IX | Nathan Quinn |
| 2017 | Australian Rally Championship | 1st | Mitsubishi Lancer Evo IX | Nathan Quinn |
| 2018 | Asia-Pacific Rally Championship | 10th | Ford Fiesta R5 | Neil Allport Motorsport |
| 2018 | New Zealand Rally Championship | 6th | Ford Fiesta Proto; Ford Fiesta R5; Mitsubishi Lancer Evo VIII; Peugeot 208 Proto | Nathan Quinn |
| 2021 | Australian Rally Championship | 5th | Mitsubishi Lancer Evo X | Nathan Quinn |
| 2022 | Australian Rally Championship | 8th | Hyundai i20 G4 | Nathan Quinn |

=== World Rally Championship results ===
| Year | Entrant | Car | 1 | 2 | 3 | 4 | 5 | 6 | 7 | 8 | 9 | 10 | 11 | 12 | 13 | WDC | Points |
|---|---|---|---|---|---|---|---|---|---|---|---|---|---|---|---|---|---|
| 2013 | Motorsport Italia | Mini John Cooper Works WRC | MCO | SWE | MEX | POR | ARG | GRE | ITA | FIN | GER | AUS; 8 | FRA | ESP | GBR | 26th | 4 |
