= 2015 Asia-Pacific Rally Championship =

2015 Asia-Pacific Rally season

Seasons
- ← 2014 2016 →

The 2015 Asia-Pacific Rally Championship season is an international rally championship sanctioned by the FIA. The championship was contested by a combination of regulations with Group N competing directly against Super 2000 cars for points.

The championship began in New Zealand on 17 April and concluded in China on 1 November. The Asia Cup sub-championship will continue on until a 13 December finish in India. The championship was held over six events with a candidate event included as part of the Asia Cup.

== Event calendar and results ==
The 2015 APRC is as follows:

Round	Rally name	Podium finishers				Statistics			
Round	Rally name	Rank	Driver	Car	Time	Stages	Length	Starters	Finishers
1	(New Zealand) International Rally of Whangarei (17–19 April)	1	(United States) Ken Block	Ford Fiesta S2000	2:54:53.6	16	281.30 km	48	18
1	(New Zealand) International Rally of Whangarei (17–19 April)	2	(Sweden) Pontus Tidemand	Škoda Fabia S2000	2:55:29.4	16	281.30 km	48	18
1	(New Zealand) International Rally of Whangarei (17–19 April)	3	(New Zealand) Ben Hunt	Subaru Impreza WRX STi	2:57:02.1	16	281.30 km	48	18
2	(France) Rallye de Nouvelle-Calédonie (15–17 May)	1	(India) Gaurav Gill	Škoda Fabia S2000	2:29:16.4	16	246.34 km	20	15
2	(France) Rallye de Nouvelle-Calédonie (15–17 May)	2	(Sweden) Pontus Tidemand	Škoda Fabia S2000	2:29:56.0	16	246.34 km	20	15
2	(France) Rallye de Nouvelle-Calédonie (15–17 May)	3	(France) Jean-Louis Leyraud	Škoda Fabia S2000	2:35:39.6	16	246.34 km	20	15
3	(Australia) International Rally of Queensland (19–21 June)	1	(Sweden) Pontus Tidemand	Škoda Fabia S2000	2:01:23.8	18	227.06 km	48	29
3	(Australia) International Rally of Queensland (19–21 June)	2	(New Zealand) Michael Young	Subaru Impreza WRX STi	2:05:25.0	18	227.06 km	48	29
3	(Australia) International Rally of Queensland (19–21 June)	3	(Indonesia) Subhan Aksa	Mitsubishi Lancer Evolution X	2:08:00.8	18	227.06 km	48	29
4	(Malaysia) Malaysian Rally (14–16 August)	1	(Sweden) Pontus Tidemand	Škoda Fabia S2000	3:05:11.5	14	226.56 km	26	22
4	(Malaysia) Malaysian Rally (14–16 August)	2	(India) Gaurav Gill	Škoda Fabia S2000	3:07:08.0	14	226.56 km	26	22
4	(Malaysia) Malaysian Rally (14–16 August)	3	(China) Fan Fan	Soueast Mitsubishi Lancer EX	3:26:58.8	14	226.56 km	26	22
5	(Japan) Rally Hokkaido (18–20 September)	1	(Sweden) Pontus Tidemand	Škoda Fabia S2000	2:24:49.5	20	225.35 km	22	14
5	(Japan) Rally Hokkaido (18–20 September)	2	(New Zealand) Michael Young	Subaru Impreza WRX STi	2:36:50.1	20	225.35 km	22	14
5	(Japan) Rally Hokkaido (18–20 September)	3	(Japan) Atsushi Masumura	Mitsubishi Lancer Evolution X	2:39:25.1	20	225.35 km	22	14
6	China Rally (30 October–1 November)	1	(Sweden) Pontus Tidemand	Škoda Fabia R5	3:08:46.4	13	230.04 km	102	44
6	China Rally (30 October–1 November)	2	(Japan) Hitoshi Takayama	Subaru Impreza WRX STi	3:42:13.1	13	230.04 km	102	44
6	China Rally (30 October–1 November)	3	(New Zealand) Michael Young	Subaru Impreza WRX STi	3:58:16.7	13	230.04 km	102	44
7	Rally of India (11–13 December)	1	(India) Lohitt Urs	Mitsubishi Lancer Evolution VIII	2:22:21.4	13			
7	Rally of India (11–13 December)	2	(India) Satyan Kochar	Volkswagen Polo	2:40:13.9	13			
7	Rally of India (11–13 December)	3	(India) Pradeep RG	Mitsubishi Lancer Evolution VIII	2:45:39.0	13			

== Championship standings ==
The 2015 APRC for Drivers points was as follows:

Pos.	Driver	Vehicle	(New Zealand) NZL	(France) NCL	(Australia) AUS	(Malaysia) MAL	(Japan) JPN	(China) CHN	Total
1	(Sweden) Pontus Tidemand	Škoda Fabia S2000; Škoda Fabia R5	1 ^{14}	2 ^{13}	1 ^{13}	1 ^{14}	1 ^{14}	1 ^{14}	225
2	(New Zealand) Michael Young	Subaru Impreza WRX STi	3 ^{11}		2 ^{11}	Ret ^{5}	2 ^{12}	2 ^{12}	120
3	(India) Gaurav Gill	Škoda Fabia S2000	2 ^{11}	1 ^{13}	Ret ^{7}	2 ^{12}	Ret	Ret	104
4	(Indonesia) Subhan Aksa	Mitsubishi Lancer Evolution X	4 ^{8}		3 ^{9}				44

Key
Colour	Result
Gold	Winner
Silver	2nd place
Bronze	3rd place
Green	Points finish
Blue	Non-points finish
Blue	Non-classified finish (NC)
Purple	Did not finish (Ret)
Black	Excluded (EX)
Black	Disqualified (DSQ)
White	Did not start (DNS)
White	Cancelled (C)
Blank	Withdrew entry from the event (WD)

Note: ^{1} – ^{14} refers to the bonus points awarded for each leg of the rally for the first five place getters, 1st (7), 2nd (5), 3rd (3), 4th (2), 5th (1). There were two bonus legs for each rally.

=== Pacific Cup ===
Pos.	Driver	Vehicle	(New Zealand) NZL	(France) NCL	(Australia) AUS	Total
1	(Sweden) Pontus Tidemand	Škoda Fabia S2000	1 ^{14}	1 ^{14}	1 ^{14}	117
2	(France) Jean-Louis Leyraud	Škoda Fabia S2000	2 ^{12}	2 ^{12}	2 ^{12}	90

=== Asia Cup ===
Pos.	Driver	Vehicle	(Malaysia) MAL	(Japan) JPN	(China) CHN	(India) IND	Total
1	(Japan) Hitoshi Takayama	Subaru Impreza WRX STi	3 ^{11}	2 ^{13}	1 ^{13}		95
2	(New Zealand) Michael Young	Subaru Impreza WRX STi	Ret ^{4}	1 ^{13}	2 ^{13}		73
3	(India) Gaurav Gill	Škoda Fabia S2000	1 ^{14}	Ret	Ret		39
4	(China) Fan Fan	Soueast Mitsubishi Lancer EX	Ret	2 ^{11}			29
4	(Sri Lanka) Dinesh Deheragoda	Mitsubishi Lancer Evolution X	Ret ^{4}	3 ^{10}			29
