= 2012 Asia-Pacific Rally Championship =

2012 Asia-Pacific Rally season

Seasons
- ← 2011 2013 →

The 2012 Asia-Pacific Rally Championship season is an international rally championship sanctioned by the FIA. The championship is contested by a combination of regulations with Group N competing directly against Super 2000 cars for points. Australian driver Chris Atkinson won the championship he narrowly lost the previous year, beating the Proton R3 Rally Team he raced for in 2011. His Škoda Fabia won the Rally of Whangarei as well as his home event the International Rally of Queensland as well as finishing second in New Caledonia, Malaysia and China, building up a lead his 2011 teammate and defending champion Alister McRae could not catch once his Proton Satria Neo started winning at the Malaysian Rally and the season ending China Rally. The only other rally winners were Indian Skoda driver Gaurav Gill at the Rallye de Nouvelle Calédonie and Malaysian Proton driver Karamjit Singh. Super 2000 cars dominated results with only New Zealand driver Brian Green finishing in the top three at any event in a Group N car.

== Selected entries ==
The following teams and drivers represent the major entries participating in the 2012 season:

Constructor	Car	Entrant	Driver	Co-driver	Rounds
Proton	Proton Satria Neo S2000	(Malaysia) Proton Motorsports	(United Kingdom) Alister McRae	(Australia) Bill Hayes	All
Proton	Proton Satria Neo S2000	(Malaysia) Proton Motorsports	(Sweden) Per-Gunnar Andersson	(Sweden) Emil Axelsson	1–4
Proton	Proton Satria Neo S2000	(Malaysia) Proton Motorsports	(Finland) Juha Salo	(Finland) Marko Salminen	5–6
Proton	Proton Satria Neo	(Malaysia) Proton R3 Cusco Rally Team	(Malaysia) Karamjit Singh	(Malaysia) Vivek Ponnusamy	1, 3–6
Proton	Proton Satria Neo	(Malaysia) Proton R3 Cusco Rally Team	(Japan) Akira Bamba	(Japan) Takahiro Yasui	1, 3–6
Proton	Proton Satria Neo	(Malaysia) Proton R3 Cusco Rally Team	(Malaysia) Kenneth Koh	(Malaysia) Jagdev Singh	1, 3–6
Proton	Proton Satria Neo	(Malaysia) Proton R3 Cusco Rally Team	(India) Sanjay Takle	(India) Musa Sherif	1, 3–6
Škoda	Škoda Fabia S2000	(India) Team MRF	(Australia) Chris Atkinson	(Belgium) Stéphane Prévot	1–4, 6
Škoda	Škoda Fabia S2000	(India) Team MRF	(India) Gaurav Gill	(Australia) Glenn MacNeall	All
Mitsubishi	Mitsubishi Lancer Evo X	(New Zealand) Green Motorsport	(New Zealand) Brian Green	(New Zealand) Fleur Pedersen	1
Mitsubishi	Mitsubishi Lancer Evo IX	(New Zealand) Green Motorsport	(New Zealand) Brian Green	(New Zealand) Fleur Pedersen	2–3
Subaru	Subaru Impreza WRX STI	(New Zealand) MRU Motorsports	(New Zealand) Brian Green	(New Zealand) Fleur Pedersen	4–6
Subaru	Subaru Impreza WRX STI	(Japan) Cusco Racing	(Japan) Shuhei Muta	(Japan) Hajime Hoshino	5

== Race calendar and results ==
The 2012 APRC is as follows:

Round	Rally name	Podium finishers				Statistics			
Round	Rally name	Rank	Driver	Car	Time	Stages	Length	Starters	Finishers
1	(New Zealand) Rally of Whangarei (30 March – 1 April)	1	(Australia) Chris Atkinson	Škoda Fabia S2000	2:50:16.1	16	283.28 km	22	17
1	(New Zealand) Rally of Whangarei (30 March – 1 April)	2	(Sweden) Per-Gunnar Andersson	Proton Satria Neo S2000	2:50:44.3	16	283.28 km	22	17
1	(New Zealand) Rally of Whangarei (30 March – 1 April)	3	(India) Gaurav Gill	Škoda Fabia S2000	2:52:51.9	16	283.28 km	22	17
2	(France) Rallye de Nouvelle Calédonie (28–29 April)	1	(India) Gaurav Gill	Škoda Fabia S2000	2:52:35.9	19	266.49 km	11	4
2	(France) Rallye de Nouvelle Calédonie (28–29 April)	2	(Australia) Chris Atkinson	Škoda Fabia S2000	2:57:28.1	19	266.49 km	11	4
2	(France) Rallye de Nouvelle Calédonie (28–29 April)	3	(New Zealand) Brian Green	Mitsubishi Lancer Evo IX	3:08:21.6	19	266.49 km	11	4
3	(Australia) Rally Queensland (26–27 May)	1	(Australia) Chris Atkinson	Škoda Fabia S2000	2:20:52.4	19	235.86 km	14	10
3	(Australia) Rally Queensland (26–27 May)	2	(United Kingdom) Alister McRae	Proton Satria Neo S2000	2:24.50.3	19	235.86 km	14	10
3	(Australia) Rally Queensland (26–27 May)	3	(Australia) Michael Boaden (ARC)	Mitsubishi Lancer Evo IX	2:25.33.5	19	235.86 km	14	10
4	(Malaysia) Malaysian Rally (14–15 July)	1	(United Kingdom) Alister McRae	Proton Satria Neo S2000	2:57:31.5	15	235.28 km	14	9
4	(Malaysia) Malaysian Rally (14–15 July)	2	(Australia) Chris Atkinson	Škoda Fabia S2000	3:22:56.6	15	235.28 km	14	9
4	(Malaysia) Malaysian Rally (14–15 July)	3	(New Zealand) Brian Green	Subaru Impreza WRX STI	3:24:08.1	15	235.28 km	14	9
5	(Japan) Rally Hokkaido (15–16 September)	1	(Malaysia) Karamjit Singh	Proton Satria Neo	2:30:28.3	18	220.48 km	41	28
5	(Japan) Rally Hokkaido (15–16 September)	2	(Japan) Akira Bamba	Proton Satria Neo	2:33:58.1	18	220.48 km	41	28
5	(Japan) Rally Hokkaido (15–16 September)	3	(New Zealand) Brian Green	Subaru Impreza WRX STI	2:34:29.0	18	220.48 km	41	28
6	China Rally (26–28 October)	1	(United Kingdom) Alister McRae	Proton Satria Neo S2000	03:02:33.1	13	230.96 km	10	9
6	China Rally (26–28 October)	2	(Australia) Chris Atkinson	Škoda Fabia S2000	03:04:19.6	13	230.96 km	10	9
6	China Rally (26–28 October)	3	(Finland) Juha Salo	Proton Satria Neo S2000	03:09:31.7	13	230.96 km	10	9

== Championship standings ==
The 2012 APRC for Drivers points is as follows:

Position	Driver	Vehicle	(New Zealand) NZL	(France) NCL	(Australia) AUS	(Malaysia) MAL	(Japan) JPN	(China) CHN	Total
1	(Australia) Chris Atkinson	Škoda Fabia S2000	1 ^{12}	2 ^{9}	1 ^{12}	2 ^{7}		2 ^{10}	154
2	(United Kingdom) Alister McRae	Proton Satria Neo S2000	4 ^{4}	Ret ^{7}	2 ^{7}	1 ^{8}	Ret ^{5}	1 ^{10}	121
3	(New Zealand) Brian Green	Mitsubishi Lancer Evolution IX	5 ^{2}	3 ^{6}	3 ^{4}	3 ^{4}	3 ^{8}	3 ^{5}	114
4	(India) Gaurav Gill	Škoda Fabia S2000	3 ^{6}	1 ^{10}	Ret ^{7}	Ret ^{5}	Ret ^{7}	Ret ^{7}	82
5	(Malaysia) Karamjit Singh	Proton Satria Neo	6		Ret	4 ^{4}	1 ^{8}	4 ^{3}	72
6	(Japan) Akira Bamba	Proton Satria Neo	Ret		5 ^{2}	5 ^{1}	2 ^{5}	5 ^{1}	57
7	(Sweden) Per-Gunnar Andersson	Proton Satria Neo S2000	2 ^{12}	Ret ^{2}	4 ^{4}	Ret ^{7}			55
8	(Malaysia) Kenneth Koh	Proton Satria Neo	7		Ret	7	4 ^{2}	6	34
9	(India) Sanjay Takle	Proton Satria Neo	8		6	6	Ret ^{1}	7	27

Key
Colour	Result
Gold	Winner
Silver	2nd place
Bronze	3rd place
Green	Points finish
Blue	Non-points finish
Blue	Non-classified finish (NC)
Purple	Did not finish (Ret)
Black	Excluded (EX)
Black	Disqualified (DSQ)
White	Did not start (DNS)
White	Cancelled (C)
Blank	Withdrew entry from the event (WD)

Note: ^{1} – ^{12} refers to the bonus points awarded for each leg of the rally for the first five place getters, 1st (7), 2nd (5), 3rd (3), 4th (2), 5th (1). There are two bonus legs for each rally.
