= 2010 Asia-Pacific Rally Championship =

2010 Asia-Pacific Rally season

Seasons
- ← 2009 2011 →

The 2010 Asia-Pacific Rally Championship season is an international rally championship sanctioned by the FIA.

With four-time champion Cody Crocker no longer contesting the series, it was expected to be a more open championship, and so it has proven. After five rounds of the series 1999 champion Katsuhiko Taguchi holds a three-point lead over fellow Mitsubishi driver Gaurav Gill. Taguchi won the first event of the series at Malaysia and was first registered competitor home in Japan behind veteran campaigner Toshi Arai (Subaru), but disappointing rallies in New Zealand and Australia left his early lead vulnerable. Gill was second in Malaysia and collected the points for third in Japan. Gill broke through for a points win at the Rally of Queensland, finishing over two minutes behind overall event winner, Australian Rally Championship competitor, Simon Evans (Subaru).

Subaru driver Rifat Sungkar got his breakthrough points win at the New Caledonia rally, finishing second behind Pacific Cup registered racer Brendan Reeves (Subaru), putting the Indonesian driver in a clear third.

The only factory team in the series the Proton R3 Malaysia Rally Team, entered a pair of S2000 class Proton Satrias for former WRC drivers Chris Atkinson and Alister McRae. The pair have pushed hard for podium finishes but have had reliability issues developing completely new cars.

With the completion of Rallye de Nouvelle Calédonie, the Pacific Cup was completed. Australian driver Brendan Reeves rounded off the competition with an outright win and claiming the Pacific Cup, which takes in the Australia, New Zealand and New Caledonia rallies. Reeves scored almost double the points of New Zealand Production World Rally Championship competitor, Hayden Paddon (Mitsubishi). Paddon tied for second with Glen Raymond (Mitsubishi) and Brian Green.

The Asia Cup still has one round to run, Taguchi leads by two points over Gill with Hiroshi Yanagisawa third also in a Mitsubishi.

== Race calendar and results ==
The 2010 APRC was as follows:

Round	Date	Event	Location	Winner
1	April 24–25	Malaysian Rally	Malaysia	(Japan) Katsuhiko Taguchi
2	May 22–23	Rally Hokkaido	Hokkaidō, Japan	(Japan) Toshi Arai*
3	July 3–4	Rally of Whangarei	Whangārei, New Zealand	(New Zealand) Hayden Paddon
4	July 31–August 1	Rally Queensland	Imbil, Australia	(Australia) Simon Evans*
5	August 28–29	Rallye de Nouvelle Calédonie	(France) Nouméa, New Caledonia	(Australia) Brendan Reeves*
6	September 25–26	Rally Indonesia	Indonesia	event cancelled
7	November 6–7	China Rally	China	(Japan) Yuya Sumiyama*

* Not registered for APRC points.

== Championship standings ==
The 2010 APRC for Drivers points was as follows:

Position	Driver	Vehicle	Malaysia	Hokkaido	Whangarei	Queensland	N.Calédonie	China	Total
1	(Japan) Katsuhiko Taguchi	Mitsubishi Lancer Evolution X	1st (37)	1st (37)	6th (8)	3rd (18)		Ret	100
2	(India) Gaurav Gill	Mitsubishi Lancer Evolution X	2nd (26)	3rd (23)	7th (11)	1st (37)	DNS	Ret	97
3	(United Kingdom) Alister McRae	Proton Satria Neo S2000	Ret (7)	Ret (3)	2nd (26)	Ret (5)		1st (40)	81
4	(Indonesia) Rifat Sungkar	Subaru Impreza WRX; Mitsubishi Lancer Evolution IX	3rd (20)		5th (10)	Ret	1st (39)	Ret (2)	71
5	(Australia) Chris Atkinson	Proton Satria Neo S2000	4th (15)	Ret		Ret (7)		2nd (26)	48
6	(New Zealand) Hayden Paddon	Mitsubishi Lancer Evolution IX			1st (39)				39
7	(Japan) Hiroshi Yanagisawa	Mitsubishi Lancer Evolution X	Ret	2nd (26)				Ret (7)	33
8	(Australia) Glen Raymond	Mitsubishi Lancer Evolution X				2nd (24)			24
9	(France) Alain Dalstein	Mitsubishi Lancer Evo					2nd (24)		24
10	(New Zealand) Dean Sumner	Mitsubishi Lancer Evolution IX			3rd (20)				20
11	(France) Stephane Lechanteur-Socci	Mitsubishi Lancer Evo					3rd (19)		19
12	(China) Wei Hongjie	Mitsubishi Lancer Evolution IX						3rd (17)	17
13	(Japan) Yuya Sumiyama	Mitsubishi Lancer Evolution X		4th (16)					16
14	(China) Liu Caodong	Mitsubishi Lancer Evolution IX						4th (15)	15
15	(New Zealand) Sloan Cox	Mitsubishi Lancer Evolution X			4th (14)				14
16	(Japan) Fuyuhiko Takahashi	Subaru Impreza WRX STI		5th (10)					10
16	(China) Li Wei	Subaru Impreza WRX STI						5th (10)	10
18	(France) Alexis Barbou	Mitsubishi Lancer Evo					Ret (5)		5
18	(France) Steeve Octobon	Subaru Impreza WRX STI					Ret (5)		5
20	(Australia) Brendan Reeves	Subaru Impreza WRX STI				Ret (2)			2
20	(New Zealand) Ben Jagger	Subaru Impreza WRX			Ret (2)				2
20	(China) Xu Jun	Mitsubishi Lancer Evolution X						Ret (2)	2
23	(Japan) Satoru Ito	Mitsubishi Lancer Evolution IX	Ret (1)						1
