= 2013 Asia-Pacific Rally Championship =

2013 Asia-Pacific Rally season

Seasons
- ← 2012 2014 →

The 2013 Asia-Pacific Rally Championship season is an international rally championship sanctioned by the FIA. The championship is contested by a combination of regulations with Group N competing directly against Super 2000 cars for points. A new rally was added to the calendar, the first since Rally of Queensland in 2009, in the Thailand Rally.

Indian driver Gaurav Gill won the Asian-Pacific championship after many years in the series. Gill won the championship despite his Finnish team mate Esapekka Lappi winning more events. Gill wrapped the title up early as the only rival outside of the Team MRF squad, Subaru driver Sanjay Takle, did not attend the final round at the China Rally.

Australian driver Simon Knowles won the Pacific Cup held over the three Pacific ocean events. The Asia Cup was held over three of the four Asian events, with the China Rally being left out in favour of candidate rally, the Thailand Rally. The Asia Cup was won by New Zealand driver Michael Young.

== Race calendar and results ==
The 2013 APRC is as follows:

Round	Rally name	Podium finishers				Statistics			
Round	Rally name	Rank	Driver	Car	Time	Stages	Length	Starters	Finishers
1	(New Zealand) International Rally of Whangarei (18–19 May)	1	(New Zealand) Hayden Paddon	Mitsubishi Lancer Evo IX	2:47:48.4	16	288.16 km	52	28
1	(New Zealand) International Rally of Whangarei (18–19 May)	2	(Finland) Esapekka Lappi	Škoda Fabia S2000	2:51:18.3	16	288.16 km	52	28
1	(New Zealand) International Rally of Whangarei (18–19 May)	3	(New Zealand) Richard Mason	Subaru Impreza WRX	2:51:54.0	16	288.16 km	52	28
2	(France) Rallye de Nouvelle-Calédonie (14–16 June)	1	(India) Gaurav Gill	Škoda Fabia S2000	1:57:12.3	17	236.59 km	21	8
2	(France) Rallye de Nouvelle-Calédonie (14–16 June)	2	(France) Emmanuel Guigou	Renault Clio R3	2:05:07.6	17	236.59 km	21	8
2	(France) Rallye de Nouvelle-Calédonie (14–16 June)	3	(France) Eugène Creugnet	Mitsubishi Lancer Evo VII	2:14:31.7	17	236.59 km	21	8
3	(Australia) International Rally of Queensland (13–14 July)	1	(Australia) Eli Evans	Honda Jazz	2:07:51.0	21	214.06 km	57	36
3	(Australia) International Rally of Queensland (13–14 July)	2	(Finland) Esapekka Lappi	Škoda Fabia S2000	2:08:43.8	21	214.06 km	57	36
3	(Australia) International Rally of Queensland (13–14 July)	3	(Australia) Tom Wilde	Renault Clio R3	2:10:37.6	21	214.06 km	57	36
4	(Malaysia) Malaysian Rally (24–25 August)	1	(China) Fan Fan	Mitsubishi Lancer Evo IX	3:14:29.6	15	219.90 km	34	21
4	(Malaysia) Malaysian Rally (24–25 August)	2	(Japan) Shuhei Muta	Subaru Impreza WRX STi	3:16:37.3	15	219.90 km	34	21
4	(Malaysia) Malaysian Rally (24–25 August)	3	(France) Daniel Palau	Subaru Impreza WRX STi	3:18:24.1	15	219.90 km	34	21
5	(Japan) Rally Hokkaido (28–29 September)	1	(India) Gaurav Gill	Škoda Fabia S2000	2:26:26.2	18	232.32 km	81	41
5	(Japan) Rally Hokkaido (28–29 September)	2	(Japan) Norihiko Katsuta	Subaru Impreza WRX STi	2:27:03.2	18	232.32 km	81	41
5	(Japan) Rally Hokkaido (28–29 September)	3	(Japan) Fumio Nutahara	Mitsubishi Lancer Evo X	2:27:04.2	18	232.32 km	81	41
6	China Rally (2–3 November)	1	(Finland) Esapekka Lappi	Škoda Fabia S2000	3:01:46.9	13	230.92 km	72	22
6	China Rally (2–3 November)	2	(United Kingdom) Niall McShea	Škoda Fabia S2000	3:05:06.4	13	230.92 km	72	22
6	China Rally (2–3 November)	3	(India) Gaurav Gill	Škoda Fabia S2000	3:07:24.3	13	230.92 km	72	22
7	Thailand Rally (7–8 December)	1	(France) Daniel Palau	Subaru Impreza WRX STi	3:06:31.7	13	229.80 km	14	5
7	Thailand Rally (7–8 December)	2	(Thailand) Wittaya Ruegchan	Mitsubishi Lancer Evo X	3:12:38.8	13	229.80 km	14	5
7	Thailand Rally (7–8 December)	3	(New Zealand) Michael Young	Toyota Vitz	3:20:25.7	13	229.80 km	14	5

== Championship standings ==
The 2013 APRC for Drivers points is as follows:

Position	Driver	Vehicle	(New Zealand) NZL	(France) NCL	(Australia) AUS	(Malaysia) MAL	(Japan) JPN	(China) CHN	Total
1	(India) Gaurav Gill	Škoda Fabia S2000	2 ^{12}	1 ^{10.5}	Ret ^{6}	Ret ^{7}	1 ^{14}	2 ^{10}	145.5
2	(Finland) Esapekka Lappi	Škoda Fabia S2000	1 ^{14}	Ret	1 ^{14}	Ret	Ret	1 ^{14}	117
3	(India) Sanjay Takale	Subaru Impreza WRX STi	4 ^{7}	2 ^{9}	2 ^{11}	Ret	2 ^{11}		104
4	(New Zealand) Michael Young	Toyota Vitz	3 ^{9}		Ret ^{4}	1 ^{13}	3 ^{11}		92
5	(Japan) Hiroshi Asakura	Subaru Impreza WRX STI; Proton Satria Neo	Ret ^{5}		3 ^{8}	Ret ^{5}	4 ^{8}		53

Key
Colour	Result
Gold	Winner
Silver	2nd place
Bronze	3rd place
Green	Points finish
Blue	Non-points finish
Blue	Non-classified finish (NC)
Purple	Did not finish (Ret)
Black	Excluded (EX)
Black	Disqualified (DSQ)
White	Did not start (DNS)
White	Cancelled (C)
Blank	Withdrew entry from the event (WD)

Note: ^{1} – ^{12} refers to the bonus points awarded for each leg of the rally for the first five place getters, 1st (7), 2nd (5), 3rd (3), 4th (2), 5th (1). There are two bonus legs for each rally.

=== Pacific Cup ===
Position	Driver	Vehicle	(New Zealand) NZL	(France) NCL	(Australia) AUS	Total
1	(Australia) Simon Knowles	Mitsubishi Lancer Evo IX	4 ^{8}	2 ^{9}	1 ^{13}	85
2	(India) Gaurav Gill	Škoda Fabia S2000	1 ^{14}	1 ^{10.5}	Ret ^{7}	71.5
3	(Australia) Matt van Tuinen	Subaru Impreza WRX STI	2 ^{12}	Ret		30
4	(Australia) Bruce Fullerton	Mitsubishi Lancer Evo IX	3 ^{10}	Ret		25
5	(France) Claude Clavel	Mitsubishi Lancer Evo IX	Ret ^{3}	Ret		3

=== Asia Cup ===
Position	Driver	Vehicle	(Malaysia) MAL	(Japan) JPN	(Thailand) THA	Total
1	(New Zealand) Michael Young	Toyota Vitz	2 ^{10}	5 ^{8}	1 ^{11}	82
2	(Japan) Shuhei Muta	Subaru Impreza WRX STi	1 ^{13}	2 ^{12}	Ret	68
3	(Japan) Yuya Sumiyama	Subaru Impreza WRX STI	Ret ^{7}	1 ^{14}	Ret ^{7}	53
4	(Japan) Tomohide Hasegawa	Mitsubishi Lancer Evo X	4 ^{6}	4 ^{8}	Ret ^{5}	43
5	(Thailand) Chaiyan Longton	Suzuki Swift	3 ^{10}	Ret	Ret ^{5}	30
6	(India) Sanjay Takale	Subaru Impreza WRX STi	Ret	3 ^{8}	Ret ^{6}	29
7	(Japan) Hiroshi Asakura	Proton Satria Neo	Ret ^{4}	6 ^{4}		16
