= 2001 Asia-Pacific Rally Championship =

2001 Asia-Pacific Rally season

Seasons
- ← 2000 2002 →

The 2001 Asia-Pacific Rally Championship season (APRC) was an international rally championship organized by the FIA. The champion was Malaysian driver Karamjit Singh.

== Calendar ==
Round	Date	Event	Winner
1	May 4–6	(Australia) Rally of Canberra	(Italy) Nico Caldarola
2	June 1–3	(France) Rallye de Nouvelle-Calédonie	(Malaysia) Karamjit Singh
3	Jun 29-Jul 1	(New Zealand) Rally of Rotorua	(Malaysia) Karamjit Singh
4	September 7–9	Rally Malaysia	(Malaysia) Karamjit Singh
5	October 20–22	Rally of China	(Italy) Nico Caldarola
6	Oct 30-Nov 2	Rally of Thailand	(Italy) Nico Caldarola

== Points ==
Position	Driver	Points
1	(Malaysia) Karamjit Singh	59
2	(Italy) Nico Caldarola	49
3	(United Kingdom) John Lloyd	7
4	(Japan) Nobuhiro Tajima	1
