= Thailand Rally =

The Thailand Rally, also known as the Rally of Thailand, is an international rallying event based in Bangkok, Thailand. The event is a round of the Asia-Pacific Rally Championship Asia Cup, the Tri-Nations Rally series and the Thailand Rally Championship.

The centrepiece of the Thailand Rally Championship, the rally was first in 1989 and joined the Asia-Pacific Rally Championship (APRC) in 1992. It remained a long-running component of the championship, frequently as the first or last round. It ran through the APRC's heyday when it was seen as a junior series for future World Rally Championship stars and was won by drivers like Tommi Makinen and Colin McRae. Malaysian driver Karamjit Singh has had the most success with three victories. The rally was dropped from the APRC after the 2003 event, returned for 2005 and was dropped again. In 2013 the rally returned to the APRC as a candidate round and also a final round of the APRC Asia Cup, although it will not count for overall APRC points.

== List of winners ==
Sourced in part from:

Year	Winner	Car
1989	(Thailand) Pornsawan Siriwattanakul	Mitsubishi Galant VR-4
1990	(Japan) Kenjiro Shinozuka	Mitsubishi Galant VR-4
1991	(Malaysia) Henry Yap	Proton Saga
1992	(Australia) Ross Dunkerton	Mitsubishi Galant VR-4
1993	(New Zealand) Possum Bourne	Subaru Legacy RS
1994	(Sweden) Kenneth Eriksson	Mitsubishi Lancer Evo II
1995	(Finland) Tommi Makinen	Mitsubishi Lancer Evo III
1996	(United Kingdom) Colin McRae	Subaru Impreza WRX
1997	(Portugal) Rui Madeira	Subaru Impreza WRX
1998	(Japan) Yoshihiro Kataoka	Mitsubishi Lancer Evo III
1999	(Malaysia) Karamjit Singh	Ford Escort WRC
2000	(Malaysia) Karamjit Singh	Proton Pert
2001	(Italy) Nico Caldarola	Mitsubishi Lancer Evo VI
2002	(Italy) Nico Caldarola	Mitsubishi Lancer Evo VII
2003	(Malaysia) Karamjit Singh	Proton Pert
2004	(Thailand) Narasak Ithiritphong	Mitsubishi Lancer Evo VII
2005	(Finland) Jussi Valimaki	Mitsubishi Lancer Evo VIII
2006	(Malaysia) Saladin Mazlan	Subaru Impreza WRX
2007	(New Zealand) Reece Jones	Mitsubishi Lancer Evo IX
2008	(Finland) Jouni Arolainen	Ford Focus RS WRC
2009	(Finland) Jouni Arolainen	Subaru Impreza WRX STi
2010	(Thailand) Wittaya Ruegchan	Mitsubishi Lancer Evo IX
2011	(New Zealand) Brian Green	Subaru Impreza WRX STi
2012	(New Zealand) Tom Cave	Proton Satria Neo S2000
2013	(France) Daniel Palau	Subaru Impreza WRX STi
2014	(Japan) Mitsuhiro Kunisawa	Subaru Impreza WRX STi
2015	(Thailand) Wittaya Ruegchan	Mitsubishi Lancer Evo X
2016	(Japan) Mitsuhiro Kunisawa	Subaru Impreza WRX STi
2017	(Thailand) Wittaya Ruegchan	Mitsubishi Lancer Evo X
2018	(Indonesia) H. Rachmat	Mitsubishi Lancer Evo VIII
