= Castrol International Rally =

Australian rally

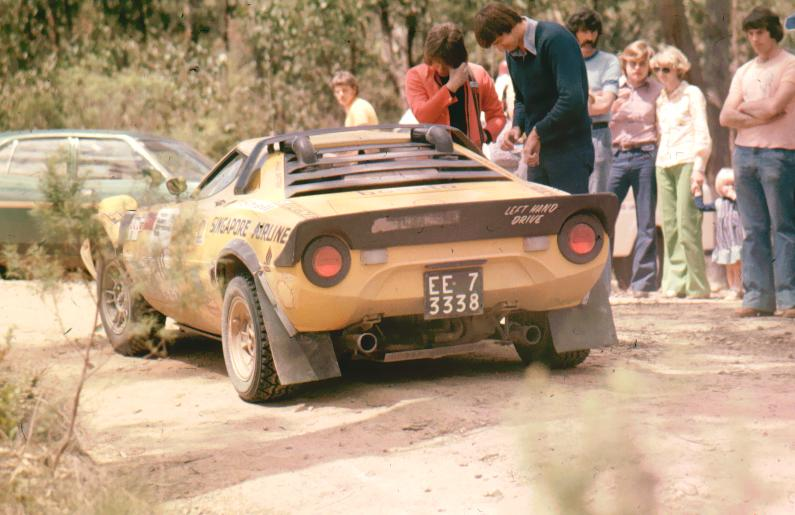
Lancia Stratos during 1975 Castrol International Rally.

The Castrol International Rally was a major Australian rally held in the forests around Canberra, between 1974 and 1981.

The rally originated as the Don Capasco Rally in 1974 and by 1976 had attracted major oil company Castrol as sponsor and was then run under the name 'Castrol International Rally'. Local Canberra rally driver Greg Carr dominated the event with six successive victories from 1975 to 1980. The first two wins were in Gerry Ball sponsored Datsuns and Carr then won four titles in a row for Colin Bond's Ford works team driving Ford Escorts.

The Castrol International Rally drew huge crowds to the forests around Canberra and in the late 1970s was second only to the famous Southern Cross Rally in prestige.

The event attracted leading rally drivers and teams from Australia and New Zealand and in its heyday the Castrol International lured world rally champions Ari Vatanen and Stig Blomqvist to compete.

In 1988 the Rally of Canberra was first held in the forests near Canberra utilising some of the same roads as the earlier Castrol International Rally.
