= International Rally of Queensland =

The International Rally of Queensland, known previously as Rally Queensland, is a rallying event held in the Gympie Region of Queensland, Australia run by the Brisbane Sporting Car Club. The rally was based for most of its out of the state capital Brisbane but in more recent times has moved north along the coast to various centres in the Sunshine Coast area. The rally begins in Caloundra before moving inland to forest roads in near Imbil and Kandanga. The rally was first held in 1968 as part of the original Australian Rally Championship and has been part of the ARC ever since.

With the end of the Rally of Canberra in 2008 and the Western Australian government ceasing its funding of Rally Australia in 2006 both the World and Asia-Pacific Rally Championships were both looking for new venues. Rally Queensland was selected for APRC duties and became the International Rally of Queensland in 2009.

In 2013, a competitor died after his car crashed in the Imbil State Forest.

== List of winners ==
Sourced in part from:

Year	Winner	Car
2000	(New Zealand) Possum Bourne	Subaru Impreza WRX
2001	(New Zealand) Possum Bourne	Subaru Impreza WRX
2002	(New Zealand) Possum Bourne	Subaru Impreza WRX
2003	(Australia) Cody Crocker	Subaru Impreza WRX
2004	(Australia) Chris Atkinson	Subaru Impreza WRX
2005	(Australia) Cody Crocker	Subaru Impreza WRX STi
2006	(Australia) Simon Evans	Toyota Corolla Sportivo
2007	(Australia) Simon Evans	Toyota Corolla Sportivo
2008	(Australia) Neal Bates	Toyota Corolla S2000
2009	(Australia) Simon Evans	Mitsubishi Lancer Evo IX
2010	(Australia) Simon Evans	Subaru Impreza WRX STi
2011	(United Kingdom) Mark Higgins	Mitsubishi Lancer Evo X
2012	(Australia) Chris Atkinson	Škoda Fabia S2000
2013	(Australia) Eli Evans	Honda Jazz
2014	(Czech Republic) Jan Kopecký	Škoda Fabia S2000
2015	(Sweden) Pontus Tidemand	Škoda Fabia S2000

== See also ==
- Motorsport in Australia
- Sport in Queensland
