= APRCET =

University entrance exam in India

APRCET is an entrance exam to enter research programs such as PhD in universities in Andhra Pradesh, India. It is conducted in all science, engineering and other disciplines. This test is conducted by Andhra Pradesh state council of higher education (APSCHE).
