= Gaurav Gill =

Indian rally driver (born 1981)

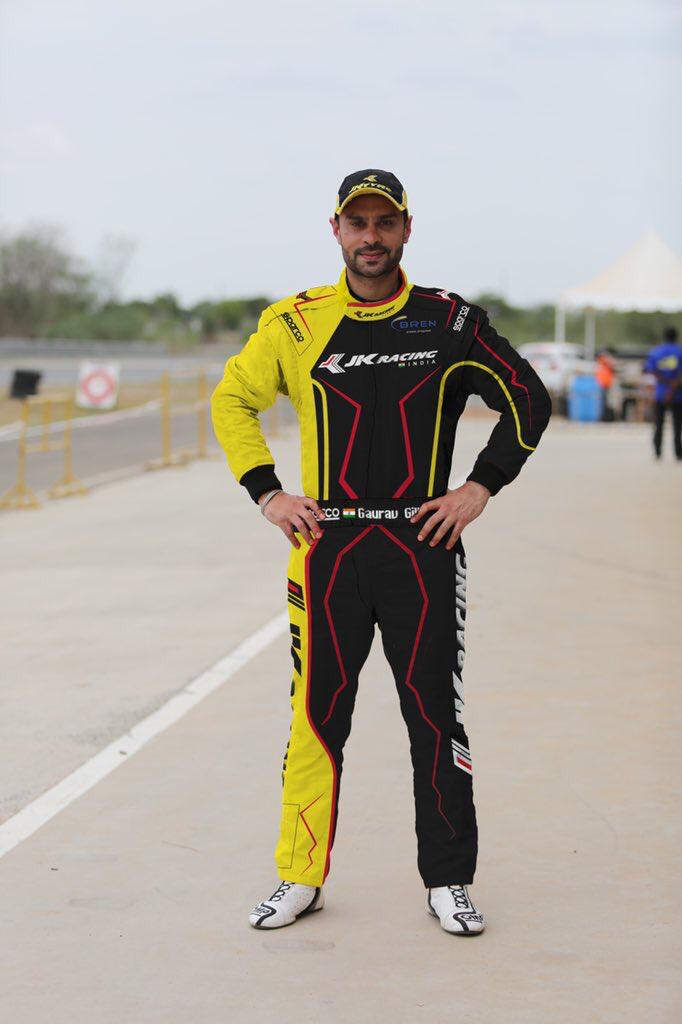
- Gaurav Gill 2019

Personal information
- Nationality: (India) Indian
- Born: 2 December 1981 (age 44)

World Rally Championship record
- Years active: 2008–2009, 2018–2019, 2022–2023
- Co-driver: (United Kingdom) Nicky Beech (United Kingdom) David Senior (Australia) Glenn Macneall (Brazil) Gabriel Morales (France) Florian Barral
- Teams: Team Sidvin India, Team MRF Tyres
- Rallies: 12
- Championships: 0
- Rally wins: 0
- Podiums: 0
- Stage wins: 0
- Total points: 0
- First rally: 2008 Wales Rally GB
- Last rally: 2023 Acropolis Rally

Gaurav Gill (born 2 December 1981) is a professional rally driver and an Indian motorsports athlete from New Delhi. In 2013, he became the first Indian driver to win the Overall FIA Asia-Pacific Rally Championship and went on to win two more APRC Overall titles in 2016 and 2017. He became the first sportsperson from motorsport in India to win the Arjuna Award from the president of India in 2019. He took part in the World Rally Championship with a WRC2 spec car in RC2 sub-class. He participated in four rounds in 2018 including the Rally in Sardegna, Rally Finland, Wales Rally GB and the Rally Australia. Overall, he clocked 11 fastest class stage times in these four rallies.

== Early life ==
Gill was born on 2 December 1981. He lives in Delhi with his doctor wife and two daughters. He first drove his childhood friend Rishi Choudhry's car at the age of ten. In the same year, he stole his mother's car and was caught. Later, his parents supported his driving under supervision in the family private space and soon he learnt drifting and sliding by 15. Besides, all this he was a serious tennis player and was seeded at the Junior level. But by 15, he left tennis and took up freestyle biking. His mother was a tennis player but he leaned towards motorsports finding a mentor in his maternal uncle Upkar Dicky Gill, a professional rally driver. Since he had to wait till 18 years to get a driving license, he took to motocross, armed with an fmsci license granted for closed-door events, and also won the trials run by TVS and bagged a factory ride. In 1999, he switched to cars, as soon as he turned 18.

== Career ==
Gill made his motorsport debut competing in the National Motocross Championship in 1998 at the K1000 round of the India National Rally Championship (INRC) for two-wheelers. He won the Popular Rally round in the 2-wheeler Group D section in 2019. Later, he moved to 4-wheel racing and started competing in car rallies and endurance races. He signed up for the Raid-de-Himalaya in 2000. Then he was runner-up in the National Road Racing Championship in 2003 and won the title in the following year. He finished the 2006 season, second overall.

== Indian National Rally Championship ==
Gill also holds the joint record for the highest number of the Indian National Rally Championship titles for four-wheelers along with Naren Kumar. He equaled the record of Kumar by winning his seventh title in 2020. The last four of his seven titles were won with the Mahindra Adventure team with Musa Sherif as his navigator.

== APRC ==
In 2007, Gill won the Indian National Rally Championship with Team MRF and made his debut at the Asia Pacific Rally Championship. He finished runner up in the APRC in 2012 and became the first Indian to win the Overall title in 2013 for Team MRF Skoda. He won his second APRC overall title winning all the six rounds he took part in, culminating in the sixth and final round, the India Rally at Chikmagalur in India.

== WRC2 ==
Gaurav took part in four rounds of the World Rally Championship in 2018 as an unregistered driver in the WRC2 class driving for the development MRF tyres, making him the only Indian driver to do so ever. He also became the first Indian to set 11 fastest class stage times in WRC2 class but his times were classified in RC2 class only, as he did not register for the WRC2 championship due to the non-homologation of his MRF tyres. His sponsor MRF Tyres roped in M-Sport in England to build and prepare a Ford Fiesta confirming to R5 rally specs.

== Career results ==
=== APRC results ===
Year	Entrant	Car	1	2	3	4	5	6	7	APRC	Points
2007	Team MRF	Mitsubishi Lancer Evo IX	NCL; Ret	NZL	AUS	JPN				8th	9
2007	Team MRF	Mitsubishi Lancer Evo VII					MAL; 5	IDN; 4	CHN; Ret	8th	9
2008	Team MRF	Mitsubishi Lancer Evo IX	NCL	AUS	NZL	JPN	IDN; 1	MAL; Ret	CHN	8th	17
2009	Team MRF	Mitsubishi Lancer Evo X	NCL	AUS; 4	NZL	JPN; Ret		IDN; Ret	CHN; Ret	4th	12
2009	Team MRF	Mitsubishi Lancer Evo IX					MAL; Ret			4th	12
2010	Team MRF	Mitsubishi Lancer Evo X	MAL; 2	JPN; 3	NZL; 7	AUS; 1	NCL; DNS	IDN; C	CHN; Ret	2nd	97
2011	Team MRF	Mitsubishi Lancer Evo IX	MAL; 2	AUS; 2	NCL; Ret	NZL; Ret	JPN; Ret	CHN; Ret		4th	63
2012	Team MRF Škoda	Škoda Fabia S2000	NZL; 3	NCL; 1	AUS; Ret	MAL; Ret	JPN; Ret	CHN; Ret		4th	82
2013	Team MRF Škoda	Škoda Fabia S2000	NZL; 2	NCL; 1	AUS; Ret	MAL; Ret	JPN; 1	CHN; 2		1st	145.5
2014	Team MRF Škoda	Škoda Fabia S2000	NZL; 1	IND; C	NCL; 2	AUS; Ret	MAL; 1	JPN; Ret	CHN; Ret	3rd	104
2015	Team MRF Škoda	Škoda Fabia S2000	NZL; 2	NCL; 1	AUS; Ret	MAL; 2	JPN; Ret	CHN; Ret		3rd	104
2016	Team MRF Škoda	Škoda Fabia S2000	NZL; 1	AUS; 1	CHN; 1	JPN; 1	MAL; 1	IND; 1		1st	192
2017	Team MRF Škoda	Škoda Fabia S2000	NZL; 1	AUS; 2	MAL; 2	JPN; 1	IND; 1			1st	174

== Awards ==
Arjuna Award In Motorsport

Sporting positions
Preceded by Chris Atkinson	Asia-Pacific Rally Champion; 2013	Succeeded by Jan Kopecky
