= Katsuhiko Taguchi =

Japanese rally driver (born 1972)

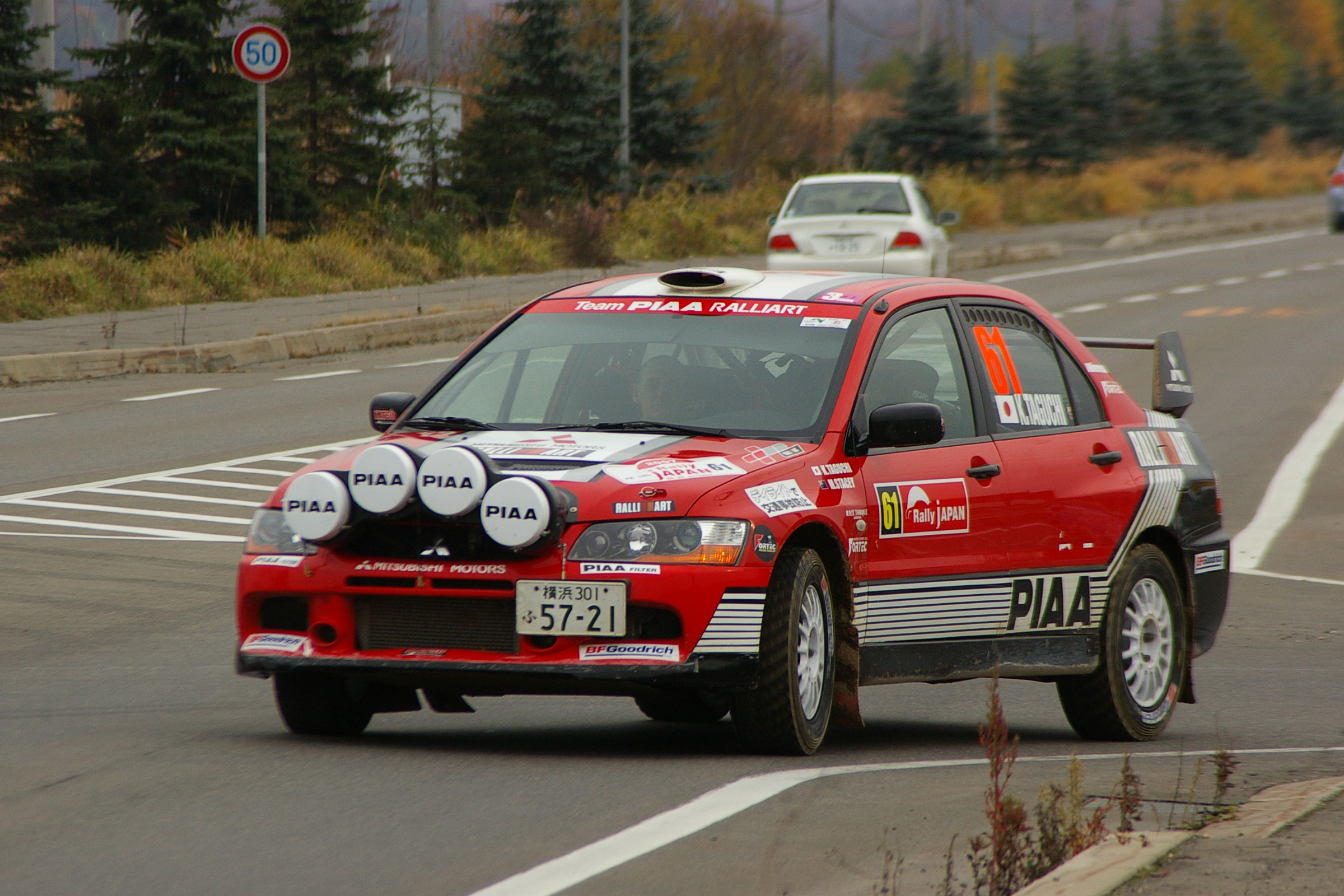
- Taguchi in his Mitsubishi Lancer Evo IX on the 2007 Rally Japan, where he finished eighth.

Personal information
- Nationality: (Japan) Japanese
- Born: 7 February 1972 (age 54)

World Rally Championship record
- Years active: 1994–2008
- Co-driver: (New Zealand) Chris Clarke (Lithuania) Fred Gocentas (Malaysia) Roland Pickering (Malaysia) Ron Teoh (United Kingdom) Derek Ringer (United Kingdom) Bobby Willis (Australia) Mark Stacey
- Teams: Proton, Mitsubishi
- Rallies: 18
- Championships: 0
- Rally wins: 0
- Podiums: 0
- Stage wins: 0
- Total points: 1
- First rally: 1995 Rally New Zealand

Katsuhiko Taguchi (田口 勝彦, Taguchi Katsuhiko; born 7 February 1972 in Okayama Prefecture) is a Japanese rally driver.

== Career ==
Taguchi began rallying in 1994. He based most of his rallying in Australia and New Zealand, competing in his first World Rally Championship event on Rally New Zealand in 1995. In 1999, he won the Asia-Pacific Rally Championship (APRC). In 2001, he competed on the Cyprus Rally as part of the factory Mitsubishi Ralliart team. He finished eighth overall on the 2007 Rally Japan, winning the Group N category and scoring one WRC point. In 2010, he won the APRC title again.

Sporting positions
| Preceded by Yoshio Fujimoto | Asia-Pacific Rally Champion; 1999 | Succeeded by Possum Bourne |
| Preceded by Cody Crocker | Asia-Pacific Rally Champion; 2010 | Succeeded by Alister McRae |
