= National Capital Rally =

The National Capital Rally, replaced the Rally of Canberra as Canberra's round of the Australian Rally Championship and is an automobile rally event held in and around Canberra, Australian Capital Territory. The Rally of Canberra first held in 1988. For many years the National Capital Rally (NatCap) was an ACT Series Rally that was held separately to the Rally of Canberra. When the Rally of Canberra ceased to exist the National Capital Rally was elevated to a round of the National Championship.

The rally in 2020 was cancelled due to the COVID-19 pandemic in Australia.

== History ==
The modern Rally of Canberra began in 1988, but the attraction of forest roads through steep terrain so close to a city has been attracting rallying to the Canberra for years. Previously the Castrol International Rally was held in much the same area utilising some of the same stage roads. Run throughout much of the 1970s the rally attracted international teams and drivers from the World Cup and World Championship teams. The last of the old style event was held in 1980 although the rally continued into 1981 on a smaller scale.

The new rally was created as an Australian Rally Championship (ARC) round in 1988, quickly becoming a popular event amongst crews and spectators. The initial event was won by that year's national champion, Queenslander Murray Coote aboard a Mazda 323 GTX. The event rapidly grew in stature, becoming second only to the similarly aged Rally Australia in prestige amongst Australian events.

The event become part of the Asia-Pacific Rally Championship (APRC) in 1999, returning international rallying to the Canberra region, attracting entries from teams in New Zealand, and most of the Asian rallying nations. Changing regulations in the ARC, in particular its emphasis on local classes, first the PRC (Production Rally Class) and later Group N+, as typified by the Neal Bates Motorsport constructed turbo 4WD Toyota Corolla Sportivo saw the event dropped from the ARC calendar as several of its competitors were not eligible to compete under the APRC regulations which consisted of the World Rally Car and Group N classes.

In more recent times the APRC has become a Group N only championship like many other regional and national championships. ARC regulations since 2006 though have instead of a single two-day rally instead have two single day rallies over the course of weekend, giving the opportunity for cars that retire on the Saturday of an event to rejoin on the Sunday. This format has seen the ARC competitors return to Canberra racing with the APRC cars but essentially the rally is now two completely different events, run simultaneously over the same stages, the International Rally of Canberra for APRC competitors and the National Rally of Canberra for ARC competitors. Group N teams can compete in both events if they nominate for both.

The nature of this combination has given rise to a rivalry between APRC and ARC competitors as to who can complete the event in the shortest time. In 2008 for the first time an ARC competitor, Simon Evans completed the rally in a faster time than any of the APRC competitors, although strangely Evans did not win the ARC round after only placing third place at the end of Saturdays rally, thus collecting fewer points than his team mate Neal Bates who won Saturday and was second to Evans on Sunday.

The APRC relocated its Australian event to the Rally Queensland in 2009 and the rally itself was discontinued a year later. The rally returned in 2013 and it regained APRC status in 2017.

The rally in 2020 was cancelled due to the COVID-19 pandemic in Australia.

=== Mineshaft ===
One of the biggest attractions of the Rally of Canberra, and the Castrol International before it, is the special stage called 'The Mineshaft'. The name originates from a section of the stage which plunges very sharply downwards towards a water crossing. It is a drop sharp enough that even the most cautious competitor will get airborne over the lip of the drop. Over the years the section has been regraded, softening the plunge but it is still a favourite for spectators, who grade the drivers going over the drop with scorecards, a tradition dating back to the Castrol International which has been attributed to an infamous troupe of Bathurst-based rally officials and competitors known as the Killer Mullet Rally Team.

Controversially, the Mineshaft stage was dropped from the 2008 event for safety reasons.

== Winners ==
Winners of previous editions of the National Capital Rally were:

Year	Driver	Co-driver	Car			
1988	Murray Coote	Iain Stewart	Mazda 323 GTX			
1989	Ross Dunkerton		Mitsubishi Galant VR-4			
1990	Ross Dunkerton		Mitsubishi Galant VR-4			
1991	Ross Dunkerton		Mitsubishi Lancer Evo			
1992	Possum Bourne	Rodger Freeth	Subaru Liberty RS			
1993	Ed Ordynski		Mitsubishi Lancer Evo			
1994	Ross Dunkerton		Mitsubishi Lancer Evo			
1995	Neal Bates	Coral Taylor	Toyota Celica GT-Four			
1996	Possum Bourne	Craig Vincent	Subaru Impreza WRX			
1997	Neal Bates	Coral Taylor	Toyota Celica GT-Four			
1998						
1999	Yoshihiro Kataoka	Satoshi Hayashi	Mitsubishi Lancer Evolution VI			
2000	Possum Bourne	Mark Stacey	Subaru Impreza WRX			
2001	Possum Bourne	Craig Vincent	Subaru Impreza WRC			
2002	Ed Ordynski	Iain Stewart	Mitsubishi Lancer Evolution VII			
2003	Cody Crocker	Greg Foletta	Subaru Impreza WRX STI			
2004	Dean Herridge	Bill Hayes	Subaru Impreza WRX STI			
2005	Cody Crocker	Dale Moscatt	Subaru Impreza WRX STI			
Year	International Driver	International Co-driver	International Car	National Driver	National Co-driver	National Car
2006	Cody Crocker	Ben Atkinson	Subaru Impreza WRX STI	Neal Bates	Coral Taylor	Toyota Corolla Sportivo
2007	Cody Crocker	Ben Atkinson	Subaru Impreza WRX STI	Simon Evans	Sue Evans	Toyota Corolla Sportivo
2008	Cody Crocker	Ben Atkinson	Subaru Impreza WRX STI	Neal Bates	Coral Taylor	Toyota Corolla S2000
Year	Driver	Co-driver	Car			
2009	Simon Evans	Sue Evans	Mitsubishi Lancer Evolution IX			
2010-2012	Not held					
2013	Eli Evans	Glen Weston	Honda Jazz			
2014	Brendan Reeves	Rhianon Smyth-Gelsomino	Mazda 2			
2015	Mick Patton	Bernie Webb	Mitsubishi Lancer Evolution X			
2016	Brendan Reeves	Rhianon Smyth-Gelsomino	Subaru Impreza STi N12			
2017	Ole Christian Veiby	Stig Rune Skjærmoen	Škoda Fabia R5			
2018	Eli Evans	Ben Searcy	Škoda Fabia R5			
