= Karamjit Singh =

Malaysian rally driver (born 1962)

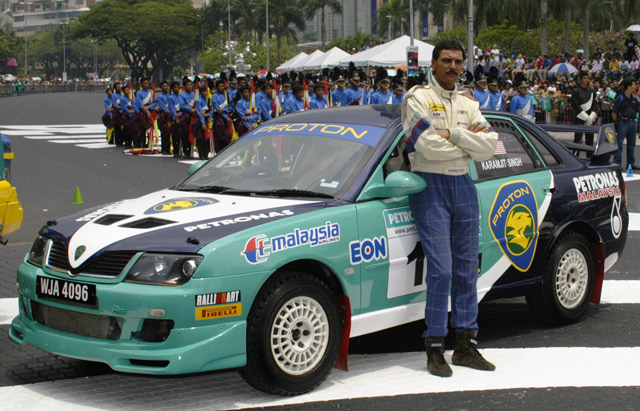

Personal information
- Nationality: (Malaysia) Malaysian
- Born: 29 January 1962 (age 64)

World Rally Championship record
- Years active: 1994–1997, 2000, 2002–2005
- Co-driver: (Malaysia) Zuber Ismail (Malaysia) Ron Teoh (Malaysia) Allen Oh (United Kingdom) John Bennie
- Teams: Proton
- Rallies: 32
- Championships: 0
- Rally wins: 0
- Podiums: 0
- Stage wins: 0
- Total points: 1
- First rally: 1994 RAC Rally

Karamjit Singh (Punjabi: ਕਰਮਜੀਤ ਸਿੰਘ, romanized: Karamajīta sigha; born 29 January 1962), also known as the Flying Sikh, is a Malaysian rally driver and was the first Asian driver to win the Fédération Internationale de l'Automobile (FIA) Production Car World Championship for Drivers, doing so on his first try. He has been rallying professionally since 1985. He has won the 2001 Asia Pacific Rally Championship for Drivers, the 2002 FIA Production Car World Championship for Drivers, as well as the 2002 and 2004 FIA Asia-Pacific Rally Championship for Drivers. He has raced for the Petronas EON Racing Team and Team Proton Pert Malaysia using Proton 4WD rally cars. His co-drivers have been (in chronological order) Zuber Ismail, Ron Teoh, Allen Oh and John Bennie.

== Sponsorship difficulties ==
In 2005, Singh began facing trouble in finding sponsors, and was unable to participate in half out of the eight rounds in the FIA Asia Pacific Rally Championship. His team itself did not have enough money to pay for mechanics and maintenance of his vehicle, and due to his absence from so many rounds in the championship, the FIA slapped him with a fine of 10,000 Euros. Singh did not even have enough money to ship his vehicle back to Malaysia from New Zealand, which itself would cost about RM57,000. Singh's plight made the headlines of a few newspapers in Malaysia, who had been informed that Singh was in the process of selling off his apartment to pay his fine and ship his car home.

When informed about the possibility of receiving public or government assistance, Singh refused such offers, stating that he believed he could find enough corporate sponsors to avoid burdening the public. Rather than accepting assistance from individuals, Singh said he would consider racing for another country. When informed, the Prime Minister of Malaysia, Abdullah Ahmad Badawi reportedly asked: "If Karamjit is a Malaysian and has been producing results and bringing honour to the country, why has support not been accorded to him?"

The former Malaysian Youth and Sports Minister, Azalina Othman Said, was also reported as stating that she had been ordered to look into the matter, and that "we want to find out why the private sector have not come forward and secondly, if Karamjit has someone to manage him and put forward his cause in the right perspective so sponsors can come forward and use the spin-off from their association."

== In popular culture ==
Singh's legacy became the inspiration for the 2026 biographical film Terbang, directed by Chiu Keng Guan and starring Irfan Zaini.

== WRC results ==
| Year | Entrant | Car | 1 | 2 | 3 | 4 | 5 | 6 | 7 | 8 | 9 | 10 | 11 | 12 | 13 | 14 | 15 | 16 | WDC | Pts |
|---|---|---|---|---|---|---|---|---|---|---|---|---|---|---|---|---|---|---|---|---|
| 1994 | Petronas EON Racing Team | Proton Wira 4WD | MON | POR | KEN | FRA | GRE | ARG | NZL | FIN | ITA | GBR; 24 | | | | | | | NC | 0 |
| 1995 | Petronas EON Racing Team | Proton Wira 4WD | MON | SWE | POR | FRA | NZL; 15 | AUS; 13 | ESP | | | | | | | | | | NC | 0 |
| 1995 | Petronas EON Racing Team | Proton Persona | | | | | | | | GBR; 17 | | | | | | | | | NC | 0 |
| 1996 | Petronas EON Racing Team | Proton Wira 4WD | SWE | KEN | IDN; EX | GRE | ARG | FIN | AUS | ITA | ESP; 12 | | | | | | | | NC | 0 |
| 1997 | Petronas EON Racing Team | Proton Wira 4WD | MON | SWE | KEN | POR | ESP | FRA | ARG | GRE | NZL; 11 | FIN | IDN; 6 | ITA | AUS; Ret | GBR; 17 | | | 34th | 1 |
| 2000 | Petronas EON Racing Team | Proton Pert | MON | SWE | KEN | POR | ESP | ARG | GRE | NZL; 18 | FIN | CYP | FRA | ITA | AUS | GBR | | | NC | 0 |
| 2002 | Petronas EON Racing Team | Proton Pert | MON | SWE | FRA | ESP | CYP; 17 | ARG; 12 | GRE | KEN; 10 | FIN; 22 | GER | ITA | NZL; Ret | AUS; 18 | GBR | | | NC | 0 |
| 2003 | Petronas EON Racing Team | Proton Pert | MON | SWE; 27 | TUR | NZL; 21 | ARG; 13 | GRE | CYP; Ret | GER; 27 | FIN | AUS; 17 | ITA | FRA | ESP | GBR | | | NC | 0 |
| 2004 | Petronas EON Racing Team | Proton Pert | MON | SWE; 35 | MEX; 15 | NZL; 21 | CYP | GRE | TUR | ARG; Ret | FIN | GER; 22 | JPN | GBR | ITA | FRA | ESP | AUS; Ret | NC | 0 |
| 2005 | Team Proton Pert Malaysia | Proton Pert | MON | SWE | MEX | NZL; 18 | ITA | CYP; Ret | TUR; Ret | GRE | ARG | FIN | GER | GBR | JPN | FRA | ESP | AUS | NC | 0 |

Sporting positions
| Preceded by Possum Bourne | Asia-Pacific Rally Champion; 2001 & 2002 | Succeeded by Armin Kremer |
| Preceded by Armin Kremer | Asia-Pacific Rally Champion; 2004 | Succeeded by Jussi Välimäki |
