= 2002 Australian GT Production Car Championship =

The 2002 Australian GT Production Car Championship was an Australian motor racing competition for Group 3E Series Production Cars. The championship, which was sanctioned by the Confederation of Australian Motor Sport as an Australian Title, was the seventh running of the Australian GT Production Car Championship.

The championship was won by Brett Peters driving a Subaru Impreza WRX STi.

== Classes ==
Entries competed in the following five classes:

- Class A : GT Performance Cars
- Class B : Sports Touring Cars
- Class C : V8 Touring Cars
- Class D : 6 Cylinder Touring Cars
- Class E : 4 Cylinder Touring Cars

== Race schedule ==
Class A cars contested an eight round series with three races per round, with the exception of the first round which was staged over two races.

- Round 1, Adelaide Parklands Circuit, South Australia, 16 & 17 March
- Round 2, Symmons Plains International Raceway, Tasmania, 7 April
- Round 3, Oran Park, New South Wales, 5 May
- Round 4, Winton Motor Raceway, Victoria, 23 June
- Round 5, Queensland Raceway, Ipswich, Queensland, 14 July
- Round 6, Wakefield Park, New South Wales, 11 August
- Round 7, Phillip Island Grand Prix Circuit, Victoria, 22 September
- Round 8, Surfers Paradise Street Circuit, Queensland, 24 & 26 October

Class B, C, D & E cars contested an eight round series with two races per round

- Round 1, Adelaide Parklands Circuit, South Australia, 16 & 17 March
- Round 2, Symmons Plains International Raceway, Tasmania, 7 April
- Round 3, Oran Park, New South Wales, 5 May
- Round 4, Winton Motor Raceway, Victoria, 23 June
- Round 5, Queensland Raceway, Ipswich, Queensland, 14 July
- Round 6, Wakefield Park, New South Wales, 11 August
- Round 7, Sandown International Motor Raceway, Victoria, 7 September
- Round 8, Phillip Island Grand Prix Circuit, Victoria, 22 September

Category Managers Procar Australia promoted the two series as separate entities, however the Confederation of Australian Motor Sport recognised Brett Peters, the winner of the GT Permormance class, as the overall 2002 Australian GT Production Car Championship winner.

== Results ==
=== GT Performance ===
Position	Driver	No.	Car	Entrant	Ade.	Sym.	Ora.	Win.	Que.	Wak.	Phi.	Sur.	Total
1	Brett Peters	1	Subaru Impreza WRX STi	Century Batteries	110	165	170	81	156	54	175	166	1077
2	Geoff Full	6	Mitsubishi Lancer RS Turbo EVO VII	Nepean EFI	121	100	82	175	122	155	125	180	1060
3	Graham Alexander	57	Mitsubishi Lancer RS Turbo EVO V	Corio Auto Parts Plus	95	132	98	117	92	65	160	78	837
4	Mark King	34	Mitsubishi Lancer RS Turbo EVO VII	Ling Springs / Delphi	36	118	110	84	90	165	76	118	797
5	Wayne Boatwright	60	Subaru Impreza WRX STi	Bilstein / Falken	76	87	89	117	60	116	96	145	786
6	David Wood	16	Subaru Impreza WRX STi	Kleenduct Australia Pty Ltd	60	157	105	170	54	145	1	-	692
7	Peter Floyd	300	HSV VX GTS 300kW	Floyd Motorsport	95	100	145	93	123	121	-	-	677
8	Steve Knight	23	Mitsubishi Lancer RS Turbo EVO VI	Mitsubishi Electric	17	74	92	140	-	38	145	44	550
9	Barry Morcom	11	HSV VX GTS 300kW	BGC Fibre Cement	48	116	70	42	100	72	-	40	488
10	John Falk	87	Subaru Impreza WRX STi	Tankworld / FRP Pools	-	64	52	50	105	33	85	96	485
11	Peter Roma	30	Mazda RX-7	supercard.com.au	72	-	104	0	92	52	17	63	400
12	Anton Mechtler	9	Mitsubishi Lancer RS Turbo EVO VII	Anton Mechtler	-	-	89	22	90	55	92	-	348
13	Trevor Haines	17	FTE AU TE50	Yamaha	-	48	24	46	81	20	-	104	323
14	Dennis Gilbert	38	Mitsubishi Lancer RS Turbo EVO V & EVO VI	Castran Gilbert Pty Ltd	48	66	10	25	44	-	80	32	305
15	Bob Pearson	33	Mazda RX-7	PRO-DUCT Motorsport Pty Ltd	34	37	54	-	-	8	60	-	193
16	Bob Hughes	15	Mitsubishi Lancer RS Turbo EVO VI	Bob Hughes Special Vehicles	-	-	-	78	-	112	-	-	190
17	Peter Boylan	7	BMW M3 Coupe E46 & Mitsubishi Lancer EVO V	Quirks Refrigeration & Anton Mechtler	-	-	34	59	-	-	-	76	169
18	Barrie Nesbitt	5	HSV VX GTS 300kW	Craig Dontas	-	-	-	31	57	52	-	-	140
19	Gary Deane	91	Subaru Impreza WRX STi	Brett Peters	-	-	-	-	-	-	76	50	126
20	Richard Davis	25	HSV VX GTS 300kW	Adelaide Caravan Park	28	-	8	19	22	16	-	-	93
21	Louis Chan	18	Nissan 200SX Spec-R	Proconept / Wurth / Motul	-	-	-	-	-	56	-	-	56
22	Don Pulver	96	Nissan 200SX Spec-R	Advanced Power	-	-	-	4	-	-	-	49	53
23	Roger Oglvie	10	Mitsubishi Lancer RS Turbo EVO V	Driving Force	-	-	-	-	-	-	-	48	48
24	Greg Haysom	200	Nissan 200SX Spec-R	Fluff	-	-	-	-	-	21	-	6	27
25	Jim Stewart	41	Subaru Impreza WRX STi	Wendy's Ice Cream	-	-	25	-	-	-	-	-	25
26	Paul Mitolo	63	Mazda RX-7	Paul Mitolo	14	-	-	-	-	-	-	-	14
27	Mike Fitzgerald	42	Nissan 200SX Spec-R	Aussie Hire Building Equipment	-	-	-	-	-	-	-	11	11
28	John Grounds	220	Nissan 200SX Spec-R	Donut King	-	-	-	-	-	-	-	8	8

=== GT Production ===
Position	Driver	No.	Car	Entrant	Ade.	Sym.	Ora.	Win.	Que.	Wak.	San.	Phi.	Total
1	Colin Osborne	13	Toyota Celica VVTL-i	Osborne Motorsport	77	56	81	120	86	98	79	113	710
2	Scott Loadsman	62	Holden VX Commodore SS	Wakeling Holden	-	125	115	98	90	19	96	125	668
3	Steve Cramp	27	BMW 323i	Scouts Australia	100	108	52	53	68	110	95	76	662
4	Martin Doxey	17	Holden Astra SRi	Holden / Quadrant / CVG	64	80	100	36	28	52	77	90	527
5	Aaron McGill	31 & 49	Toyota Celica VVTL-I & Toyota MR2	Osborne Motorsport	81	90	64	64	37	65	34	51	486
6	David Russell	68	Proton Satria GTi	Caltex Havoline	-	-	60	110	110	120	74	-	474
7	David Runkel	86	Proton Satria GTi	David Runkel	48	68	-	48	52	72	60	60	408
8	Rick Bates	22	Daihatsu Sirion GTVi	Daihatsu Motor Corp	37	48	52	28	44	49	44	48	350
9	Steven Grocl	35	Volkswagen Beetle RSi	Steven Grocl	76	-	32	90	-	-	71	-	269
10	Nathan Pilkington	77	Mitsubishi FTO V6	Jack Green Energy	125	-	93	-	-	-	-	-	218
11	Daryl Coon	70	Ford AU Falcon XR6	Daryl Coon	-	-	-	-	-	72	120	-	192
12	Alan Holgersson	95	Ford AUII Falcon XR8 220	Jayell / Delatite Ford	-	-	-	-	98	91	-	-	189
13	John McIlroy	95	Ford AUII Falcon XR8 220	Jayell / Delatite Ford	-	-	96	91	-	-	-	-	187
14	Stephen White	19	Proton Satria GTi	Team Satria Racing	-	-	-	-	-	-	45	90	135
15	Darren Palmer	28	Honda S2000 Sports	Ross Palmer Motorsport	-	-	-	-	125	-	-	-	125
16	Bill Fulton	40	Honda Integra Type-R	Nilsson Motorsport	-	105	-	-	-	-	-	-	105
17	Ian Luff	66	Honda Integra Type-R	Len Cave	100	-	-	-	-	-	-	-	100
18	Dave Mertens	71	Holden Vectra GL	Holden / Quadrant / CVG	-	-	-	-	-	-	28	60	88
19	Peter Boylan	28	Honda S2000 Sports	Ross Palmer Motorsport	-	69	-	-	-	-	-	-	69
20	Carol Jackson	10	Honda Civic VTi-R 1.6	Carol Jackson	-	-	-	-	68	-	-	-	68
21	James Dutton	66	Honda Integra	Nilsson Motorsport	-	-	-	-	-	-	-	56	56
22	Kosi Kalaitzidis	21	Proton Satria GTi	Kosi Kalaitzidis	50	-	-	-	-	-	-	-	50
23	John Cowley	28	Honda S2000 Sports	Ross Palmer Motorsport	48	-	-	-	-	-	-	-	48
24	Allan Shephard	66	Honda Integra Type-R	Sting Bar Cronulla	-	-	-	-	-	45	-	-	45
25	Chris Poulton	44	Mitsubishi FTO V6	NEC Projection	-	-	-	-	-	44	-	-	44
26	Nic Lucas	21	Proton M21	H&R Suspension Systems	-	-	-	40	-	-	-	-	40
27	Guy Edmonds	26	Honda Integra Type-R	SMI Security	-	-	-	28	-	-	-	-	28

=== Class Awards ===
Position	Driver	No.	Car	Entrant	Total
	Class B : Sports Touring Cars				
1	Colin Osborne	13	Toyota Celica VVTL-i	Osborne Motorsport	864
2	Steve Cramp	27	BMW 323i	Scouts Australia	852
3	Aaron McGill	31 & 49	Toyota Celica VVTL-I & Toyota MR2	Osborne Motorsport	713
4	Steven Grocl	35	Volkswagen Beetle RSi	Steven Grocl	360
5	Nathan Pilkington	77	Mitsubishi FTO V6	Jack Green Energy	245
6	Darren Palmer	28	Honda S2000 Sports	Ross Palmer Motorsport	125
7	Bill Fulton	40	Honda Integra Type-R	Nilsson Motorsport	116
8	Ian Luff	66	Honda Integra Type-R	Len Cave	100
9	James Dutton	66	Honda Integra	Nilsson Motorsport	96
10	Peter Boylan	28	Honda S2000 Sports	Ross Palmer Motorsport	93
11	Chris Poulton	44	Mitsubishi FTO V6	NEC Projection	90
12	Allan Shephard	66	Honda Integra Type-R	Sting Bar Cronulla	85
13	John Cowley	28	Honda S2000 Sports	Ross Palmer Motorsport	64
14	Guy Edmonds	26	Honda Integra Type-R	SMI Security	40
	Class C : V8 Touring Cars				
1	Scott Loadsman	62	Holden VX Commodore SS	Wakeling Holden	795
2	Alan Holgersson	95	Ford AUII Falcon XR8 220	Jayell / Delatite Ford	243
3	John McIlroy	95	Ford AUII Falcon XR8 220	Jayell / Delatite Ford	231
	Class D : 6 Cylinder Touring Cars				
1	Daryl Coon	74 & 70	Ford AU Falcon XR6	Daryl Coon	250
	Class E : 4 Cylinder Touring Cars				
1	Martin Doxey	17	Holden Astra SRi	Holden / Quadrant / CVG	799
2	David Runkel	86	Proton Satria GTi	David Runkel	722
3	Rick Bates	22	Daihatsu Sirion GTVi	Daihatsu Motor Corp	694
4	David Russell	68	Proton Satria GTi	Caltex Havoline	550
5	Stephen White	19	Proton Satria GTi	Team Satria Racing	1766
6	Dave Mertens	71	Holden Vectra GL	Holden / Quadrant / CVG	145
7	Carol Jackson	10	Honda Civic VTi-R 1.6	Carol Jackson	111
8	Nic Lucas	21	Proton M21	H&R Suspension Systems	90
9	Kosi Kalaitzidis	21	Proton Satria GTi	Kosi Kalaitzidis	65
