= David Russell (racing driver) =

Australian racing driver (born 1982)

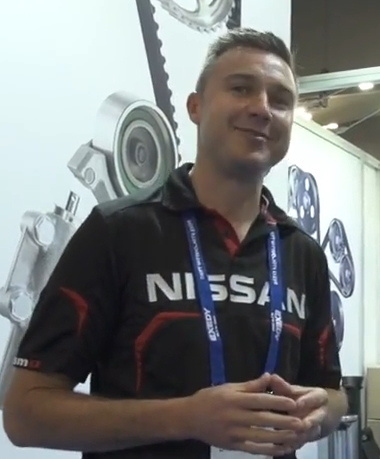
- David Russell in April 2017
- Nationality: Australian
- Born: 4 January 1982 (age 44) Casino, New South Wales
- Categorisation: FIA Silver

Supercars Championship career
- Current team: PremiAir Racing (Endurance race co-driver)
- Championships: 0
- Races: 41
- Wins: 0
- Podiums: 6
- Pole positions: 1
- 2024 position: 28th (462 pts)

David Russell (born 4 January 1982) is an Australian racing driver. Russell has competed in the Supercars Championship intermittently since 2003. As of 2024, he signed with PremiAir Nulon Racing to co-drive with Jimmy Golding, after a successful stint with Erebus Motorsport.

== Racing career ==
Russell started his circuit racing career in Production Car racing, driving a Suzuki Swift in the 2000 Australian GT Production Car Championship. In 2001 he transitioned to a Proton Satria in the same entry level class of the same series. He finished runner-up in class behind the Holden Astra of Luke Youlden. Russell stayed racing Protons through to the 2004 season when he finished third in the 2004 Australian Production Car Championship. Russell then spent three years in Carrera Cup with Sherrin Motor Sport, culminating with third place in the 2008 series behind Craig Baird and Dean Fiore, which also then led to various endurance race drives in Europe and Asia with Juniper Racing and Lago Racing.

=== Supercars Championship ===
Russell raced the 2003 Konica V8 Supercar Series racing a Ford Falcon (AU) with the Chance of a Lifetime team and made a single appearance at the Bathurst 1000 with Fernandez Motorsport. Russell returned to V8 Supercar racing after winning the 2008 Queensland 500 in a Sheerin Motorsport entered Ford Falcon (AU). Russell then moved into V8 Supercar full-time in 2009 with Howard Racing and finished third behind Jonathon Webb and James Moffat. 2010 was a disappointment, after moving to the team Webb won the championship with, Russell finished fifth. Staying with MW Motorsport in 2011, Russell again finished third, this time behind Andrew Thompson and Jack Perkins. Endurance drives with major teams also took place, Dick Johnson Racing in 2010 and Kelly Racing in 2011 which led to a Russell taking leadership role in Kelly Racing's 2012 Dunlop V8 Supercar Series team, Dreamtime Racing.

== Career results ==
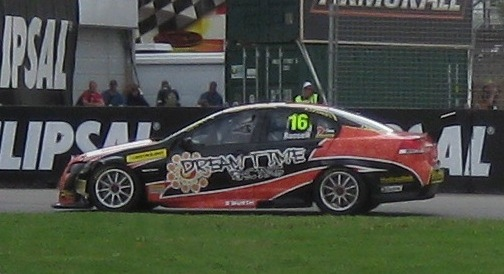
Russell drove for Dreamtime Racing in the 2012 Dunlop Series

Season	Series	Position	Car	Team
2000	Australian GT Production Car Championship Class E	6th	Suzuki Swift GTi	John Dickinson
2001	Australian GT Production Car Championship Class E	**2nd**	Proton Satria GTi	Mycar
2002	Australian GT Production Car Championship	6th	Proton Satria GTi	Caltex
2002	Australian GT Production Car Championship Class E	4th	Proton Satria GTi	Caltex
2003	Australian Production Car Championship	**3rd**	Proton Satria GTi	Team Satria Racing
2003	Australian Production Car Championship Class D	**1st**	Proton Satria GTi	Team Satria Racing
2003	Konica V8 Supercar Series	12th	Ford Falcon (AU)	MoPro
2004	Australian Production Car Championship	**2nd**	Proton Satria GTi	Team Satria Racing
2004	Australian Production Car Championship Class D	**1st**	Proton Satria GTi	Team Satria Racing
2006	Australian Carrera Cup Championship	6th	Porsche 996 GT3	Sherrin Motorsport
2007	Australian Carrera Cup Championship	8th	Porsche 997 GT3	Sherrin Motorsport
2008	Australian Carrera Cup Championship	**3rd**	Porsche 997 GT3	Sherrin Motorsport
2009	Fujitsu V8 Supercar Series	**3rd**	Ford Falcon (BA)	Howard Racing
2010	Fujitsu V8 Supercar Series	5th	Ford Falcon (BF)	MW Motorsport
2010	V8 Supercar Championship Series	42nd	Ford Falcon (FG)	Dick Johnson Racing
2011	Fujitsu V8 Supercar Series	**3rd**	Ford Falcon (BF)	MW Motorsport
2011	International V8 Supercars Championship	51st	Holden Commodore (VE)	Kelly Racing
2011	Commodore Cup	20th	Holden Commodore (VS)	Sports Alive
2012	Dunlop V8 Supercar Series	18th	Holden Commodore (VE)	Kelly Racing
2012	International V8 Supercars Championship	40th	Holden Commodore (VE)	Kelly Racing
2012	Australian GT Championship	23rd	Lamborghini Gallardo GT3	JBS
2013	International V8 Supercars Championship	54th	Nissan Altima L33	Nissan Motorsport
2013	Australian GT Championship	34th	Lamborghini Gallardo LP560	Lago Racing
2014	Australian Carrera Cup Championship	19th	Porsche 911 GT3 Cup Type 991	JBS Australia
2014	International V8 Supercars Championship	36th	Nissan Altima L33	Nissan Motorsport
2014	Australian GT Championship	13th	Lamborghini Gallardo FL2	Interlloy M Motorsport
2015	Australian Carrera Cup Championship	**2nd**	Porsche 911 GT3 Cup Type 991	Finance EZI
2015	International V8 Supercars Championship	34th	Nissan Altima L33	Nissan Motorsport
2015	ADAC GT Masters	20th	Lamborghini Gallardo R-EX	Reiter Engineering
2016	Australian Endurance Championship	11th	Lamborghini Gallardo R-EX	Lago Racing
2016	Intercontinental GT Challenge	13th	Bentley Continental GT3	Bentley Team M-Sport
2016	International V8 Supercars Championship	40th	Nissan Altima L33	Nissan Motorsport
2017	Virgin Australia Supercars Championship	52nd	Nissan Altima L33	Nissan Motorsport
2018	Virgin Australia Supercars Championship	41st	Ford FG X Falcon	Tickford Racing
2019	Dunlop Super2 Series	22nd	Holden Commodore (VF)	Matt Stone Racing
2020	Porsche Carrera Cup Australia	5th	Porsche 991 GT3 Cup	Lago Racing
2020	Virgin Australia Supercars Championship	NC	Holden Commodore (ZB)	Matt Stone Racing
2021	Supercars Championship	30th	Holden Commodore (ZB)	Erebus Motorsport
2022	Porsche Carrera Cup Australia	4th	Porsche 991 GT3 Cup	EMA Motorsport
2022	Supercars Championship	31st	Holden Commodore (ZB)	Erebus Motorsport
2023	Supercars Championship	27th	Chevrolet Camaro Mk.6	Erebus Motorsport

=== Super2 Series results ===
(key) (Races in bold indicate pole position) (Races in italics indicate fastest lap)

Year	Team	No.	Car	1	2	3	4	5	6	7	8	9	10	11	12	13	14	15	16	17	18	Position	Points
2003	MoPro	110	Ford AU Falcon	WAK; R1; Ret	WAK; R2; DNS	WAK; R3; DNS	ADE; R4; 13	EAS; R5; 12	EAS; R6; 11	EAS; R7; 9	PHI; R8; 13	PHI; R9; 7	PHI; R10; 11	WIN; R11; 10	WIN; R12; 18	WIN; R13; 11	MAL; R14; Ret	MAL; R15; 17	MAL; R16; Ret			12th	542
2009	Howard Racing	27	Ford BF Falcon	ADE; R1; 2	ADE; R2; 1	WIN; R3; 9	WIN; R4; 1	WIN; R5; 2	TOW; R6; 3	TOW; R7; 12	TOW; R8; 3	SAN; R9; 9	SAN; R10; 1	SAN; R11; 1	QLD; R12; 2	QLD; R13; 7	QLD; R14; 2	BAT; R15; 2	BAT; R16; 5	SYD; R17; Ret	SYD; R18; 5	**3rd**	**1618**
2010	MW Motorsport	28	Ford BF Falcon	ADE; R1; 14	ADE; R2; 3	QLD; R3; 3	QLD; R4; 8	QLD; R5; Ret	WIN; R6; 5	WIN; R7; 1	WIN; R8; 19	TOW; R9; 3	TOW; R10; 4	TOW; R11; 4	BAT; R12; 1	BAT; R13; 1	SAN; R14; 4	SAN; R15; 8	SAN; R16; 1	SYD; R17; 18	SYD; R18; 12	5th	1437
2011	MW Motorsport	28	Ford BF Falcon	ADE; R1; 8	ADE; R2; 13	BAR; R3; 4	BAR; R4; 2	TOW; R5; 2	TOW; R6; 4	TOW; R7; 3	QLD; R8; 5	QLD; R9; 3	QLD; R10; 2	BAT; R11; 2	BAT; R12; 2	SAN; R13; 4	SAN; R14; 16	SAN; R15; 5	SYD; R16; 4	SYD; R17; 8		**3rd**	**1594**
2012	Kelly Racing	16	Holden VE Commodore	ADE; R1; 9	ADE; R2; 14	BAR; R3; 11	BAR; R4; DSQ	BAR; R5; 6	TOW; R6; 8	TOW; R7; 6	TOW; R8; 9	QLD; R9; 9	QLD; R10; 1	**QLD**; **R11**; **5**	BAT; R12	BAT; R13	WIN; R14	WIN; R15	WIN; R16	SYD; R17	SYD; R18	18th	656
2019	Matt Stone Racing	33	Holden VF Commodore	ADE; R1	ADE; R2	ADE; R3	BAR; R4	BAR; R5	TOW; R6	TOW; R7	QLD; R8	QLD; R9	BAT; R10; 8	SAN; R11	SAN; R12	NEW; R13	NEW; R14					22nd	180

=== Supercars Championship results ===
(key) (Races in bold indicate pole position) (Races in italics indicate fastest lap)

Supercars results
Year	Team	No.	Car	1	2	3	4	5	6	7	8	9	10	11	12	13	14	15	16	17	18	19	20	21	22	23	24	25	26	27	28	29	30	31	32	33	34	35	36	37	38	39	Position	Points
2003	Fernández Racing	55	Ford AU Falcon	ADE; R1	ADE; R2	PHI; R3	EAS1; R4	WIN; R5	BAR; R6	BAR; R7	BAR; R8	HID; R9	HID; R10	HID; R11	QLD; R12	ORA; R13	SAN; R14	BAT; R15; Ret	SUR; R16	SUR; R17	PUK; R18	PUK; R19	PUK; R20	EAS2; R21	EAS2; R22																		NC	0
2010	Tekno Autosports	19	Ford FG Falcon	YMC; R1	YMC; R2	BHR; R3	BHR; R4	ADE; R5	ADE; R6	HAM; R7	HAM; R8	QLD; R9	QLD; R10	WIN; R11	WIN; R12	HDV; R13	HDV; R14	TOW; R15	TOW; R16	PHI; R17; 6	BAT; R18; 19	SUR; R19	SUR; R20	SYM; R21	SYM; R22	SAN; R23	SAN; R24	SYD; R25	SYD; R26														42nd	274
2011	Kelly Racing	7	Holden VE Commodore	YMC; R1	YMC; R2	ADE; R3	ADE; R4	HAM; R5	HAM; R6	BAR; R7	BAR; R8	BAR; R9	WIN; R10	WIN; R11	HID; R12	HID; R13	TOW; R14	TOW; R15	QLD; R16	QLD; R17	QLD; R18	PHI; R19; 14	BAT; R20; 25	SUR; R21	SUR; R22	SYM; R23	SYM; R24	SAN; R25	SAN; R26	SYD; R27	SYD; R28												51st	202
2012	Kelly Racing	51	Holden VE Commodore	ADE; R1	ADE; R2	SYM; R3; 21	SYM; R4; Ret	HAM; R5	HAM; R6	BAR; R7	BAR; R8	BAR; R9	PHI; R10	PHI; R11	HID; R12; Ret	HID; R13; Ret	TOW; R14	TOW; R15	QLD; R16	QLD; R17	SMP; R18	SMP; R19																					40th	311
2012	Kelly Racing	15	Holden VE Commodore																				SAN; QR; 12	SAN; R20; 12	BAT; R21; 15	SUR; R22	SUR; R23	YMC; R24	YMC; R25	YMC; R26	WIN; R27	WIN; R28	SYD; R29	SYD; R30									40th	311
2013	Kelly Racing	7	Nissan Altima L33	ADE; R1	ADE; R2	SYM; R3	SYM; R4	SYM; R5	PUK; R6	PUK; R7	PUK; R8	PUK; R9	BAR; R10	BAR; R11	BAR; R12	COA; R13	COA; R14	COA; R15	COA; R16	HID; R17	HID; R18	HID; R19	TOW; R20	TOW; R21	QLD; R22	QLD; R23	QLD; R24	WIN; R25	WIN; R26	WIN; R27	SAN; R28; 11	BAT; R29; Ret	SUR; R30; 17	SUR; R31; Ret	PHI; R32	PHI; R33	PHI; R34	SYD; R35	SYD; R36				54th	198
2014	Kelly Racing	15	Nissan Altima L33	ADE; R1	ADE; R2	ADE; R3	SYM; R4	SYM; R5	SYM; R6	WIN; R7	WIN; R8	WIN; R9	PUK; R10	PUK; R11	PUK; R12	PUK; R13	BAR; R14	BAR; R15	BAR; R16	HID; R17	HID; R18	HID; R19	TOW; R20	TOW; R21	TOW; R22	QLD; R23	QLD; R24	QLD; R25	SMP; R26	SMP; R27	SMP; R28	SAN; Q 17	SAN; R29; 13	BAT; R30; 8	SUR; R31; 19	SUR; R32; 9	PHI; R33	PHI; R34	PHI; R35	SYD; R36	SYD; R37	SYD; R38	36th	444
2015	Kelly Racing	15	Nissan Altima L33	ADE; R1	ADE; R2	ADE; R3	SYM; R4	SYM; R5	SYM; R6	BAR; R7	BAR; R8	BAR; R9	WIN; R10	WIN; R11	WIN; R12	HID; R13	HID; R14	HID; R15	TOW; R16	TOW; R17	QLD; R18	QLD; R19	QLD; R20	SMP; R21	SMP; R22	SMP; R23	SAN; Q Ret	SAN; R24; 10	BAT; R25; 16	SUR; R26; 9	SUR; R27; 2	PUK; R28	PUK; R29	PUK; R30	PHI; R31	PHI; R32	PHI; R33	SYD; R34	SYD; R35	SYD; R36			34th	492
2016	Kelly Racing	96	Nissan Altima L33	ADE; R1	ADE; R2	ADE; R3	SYM; R4	SYM; R5	PHI; R6	PHI; R7	BAR; R8	BAR; R9	WIN; R10	WIN; R11	HID; R12	HID; R13	TOW; R14	TOW; R15	QLD; R16	QLD; R17	SMP; R18	SMP; R19	SAN; Q 20	SAN; R20; 18	BAT; R21; 9	SUR; R22; 7	SUR; R23; 22	PUK; R24	PUK; R25	PUK; R26	PUK; R27	SYD; R28	SYD; R29										40th	405
2017	Kelly Racing	78	Nissan Altima L33	ADE; R1	ADE; R2	SYM; R3	SYM; R4	PHI; R5	PHI; R6	BAR; R7	BAR; R8	WIN; R9	WIN; R10	HID; R11	HID; R12	TOW; R13	TOW; R14	QLD; R15	QLD; R16	SMP; R17	SMP; R18	SAN; QR; 22	SAN; R19; 18	BAT; R20; Ret	SUR; R21; 16	SUR; R22; 23	PUK; R23	PUK; R24	NEW; R25	NEW; R26													52nd	195
2018	Tickford Racing	6	Ford FG X Falcon	ADE; R1	ADE; R2	MEL; R3	MEL; R4	MEL; R5	MEL; R6	SYM; R7	SYM; R8	PHI; R9	PHI; R10	BAR; R11	BAR; R12	WIN; R13; PO	WIN; R14; PO	HID; R15	HID; R16	TOW; R17	TOW; R18	QLD; R19; PO	QLD; R20; PO	SMP; R21	BEN; R22	BEN; R23	SAN; QR; 13	SAN; R24; 13	BAT; R25; 23	SUR; R26; 8	SUR; R27; C	PUK; R28	PUK; R29	NEW; R30	NEW; R31								41st	294
2020	Matt Stone Racing	35	Holden Commodore ZB	ADE; R1	ADE; R2	MEL; R3	MEL; R4	MEL; R5	MEL; R6	SMP1; R7	SMP1; R8	SMP1; R9	SMP2; R10	SMP2; R11	SMP2; R12	HID1; R13	HID1; R14	HID1; R15	HID2; R16	HID2; R17	HID2; R18	TOW1; R19	TOW1; R20	TOW1; R21	TOW2; R22	TOW2; R23	TOW2; R24	BEN1; R25	BEN1; R26	BEN1; R27	BEN2; R28	BEN2; R29	BEN2; R30	BAT; R31; Ret									NC	0
2021	Erebus Motorsport	99	Holden Commodore ZB	BAT1; R1	BAT1; R2	SAN; R3	SAN; R4	SAN; R5	SYM; R6	SYM; R7	SYM; R8	BEN; R9	BEN; R10	BEN; R11	HID; R12	HID; R13	HID; R14	TOW1; R15	TOW1; R16	TOW2; R17	TOW2; R18	TOW2; R19	SMP1; R20	SMP1; R21	SMP1; R22	SMP2; R23	SMP2; R24	SMP2; R25	SMP3; R26	SMP3; R27	SMP3; R28	SMP4; R29	SMP4; R30	BAT2; R31; 3									30th	258
2022	Erebus Motorsport	99	Holden Commodore ZB	SMP; R1	SMP; R2	SYM; R3	SYM; R4	SYM; R5	MEL; R6	MEL; R7	MEL; R8	MEL; R9	BAR; R10	BAR; R11	BAR; R12	WIN; R13	WIN; R14	WIN; R15	HID; R16	HID; R17	HID; R18	TOW; R19	TOW; R20	BEN; R21	BEN; R22	BEN; R23	SAN; R24	SAN; R25	SAN; R26	PUK; R27	PUK; R28	PUK; R29	BAT; R30; 4	SUR; R31	SUR; R32	NEW; R33	NEW; R34						31st	240
2023	Erebus Motorsport	99	Chevrolet Camaro ZL1	NEW; R1	NEW; R2	MEL; R3	MEL; R4	MEL; R5	MEL; R6	BAR; R7	BAR; R8	BAR; R9	SYM; R10	SYM; R11	SYM; R12	HID; R13	HID; R14	HID; R15	TOW; R16	TOW; R17	SMP; R18	SMP; R19	BEN; R20	BEN; R21	BEN; R22	SAN; R23; 2	BAT; R24; 2	SUR; R25	SUR; R26	ADE; R27	ADE; R28												27th	552
2024	PremiAir Racing	31	Chevrolet Camaro ZL1	BAT1; R1	BAT1; R2	MEL; R3	MEL; R4	MEL; R5	MEL; R6	TAU; R7	TAU; R8	BAR; R9	BAR; R10	HID; R11	HID; R12	TOW; R13	TOW; R14	SMP; R15	SMP; R16	BEN; R17	BEN; R18	SAN; R19; 3	BAT; R20; 6	SUR; R21	SUR; R22	ADE; R23	ADE; R24																29th	462
2025	PremiAir Racing	31	Chevrolet Camaro ZL1	SYD; R1	SYD; R2	SYD; R3	MEL; R4	MEL; R5	MEL; R6	MEL; R7	TAU; R8	TAU; R9	TAU; R10	SYM; R11	SYM; R12	SYM; R13	BAR; R14	BAR; R15	BAR; R16	HID; R17	HID; R18	HID; R19	TOW; R20	TOW; R21	TOW; R22	QLD; R23	QLD; R24	QLD; R25	BEN; R26; 25	BAT; R27; 3	SUR; R28	SUR; R29	SAN; R30	SAN; R31	ADE; R32	ADE; R33	ADE; R34						53rd*	41
2026	PremiAir Racing	31	Chevrolet Camaro ZL1	SMP; R1	SMP; R2	SMP; R3	MEL; R4	MEL; R5	MEL; R6	MEL; R7	TAU; R8	TAU; R9	TAU; R10	CHR; R11	CHR; R12	CHR; R13	SYM; R14	SYM; R15	SYM; R16	BAR; R17	BAR; R18	BAR; R19	HID; R20	HID; R21	HID; R22	TOW; R23	TOW; R24	TOW; R25	QLD; R26	QLD; R27	QLD; R28	BEN; R29	BAT; R30	SUR; R31	SUR; R32	SAN; R33	SAN; R34	ADE; R35	ADE; R36	ADE; R37				

=== Bathurst 1000 results ===
Year	Team	Car	Co-driver	Position	Laps
2003	Fernández Racing	Ford Falcon AU	(Australia) José Fernández	DNF	113
2010	Tekno Autosports	Ford Falcon FG	(Australia) Jonathon Webb	19th	161
2011	Kelly Racing	Holden Commodore VE	(Australia) Todd Kelly	24th	154
2012	Kelly Racing	Holden Commodore VE	(Australia) Rick Kelly	15th	161
2013	Nissan Motorsport	Nissan Altima L33	(Australia) Todd Kelly	DNF	20
2014	Nissan Motorsport	Nissan Altima L33	(Australia) Rick Kelly	8th	161
2015	Nissan Motorsport	Nissan Altima L33	(Australia) Rick Kelly	16th	161
2016	Nissan Motorsport	Nissan Altima L33	(Australia) Dale Wood	9th	161
2017	Nissan Motorsport	Nissan Altima L33	(Switzerland) Simona de Silvestro	DNF	152
2018	Tickford Racing	Ford Falcon FG X	(Australia) Cameron Waters	23rd	148
2020	Matt Stone Racing	Holden Commodore ZB	(Australia) Garry Jacobson	DNF	62
2021	Erebus Motorsport	Holden Commodore ZB	(Australia) Brodie Kostecki	**3rd**	161
2022	Erebus Motorsport	Holden Commodore ZB	(Australia) Brodie Kostecki	4th	161
2023	Erebus Motorsport	Chevrolet Camaro Mk.6	(Australia) Brodie Kostecki	**2nd**	161
2024	PremiAir Racing	Chevrolet Camaro Mk.6	(Australia) James Golding	6th	161
2025	PremiAir Racing	Chevrolet Camaro Mk.6	(Australia) James Golding	**3rd**	161
2026	PremiAir Racing	Chevrolet Camaro Mk.6	(Australia) Jayden Ojeda		

=== Complete Australian Carrera Cup Championship results ===
(key) (Races in bold indicate pole position – 1 point awarded all races) (Races in italics indicate fastest lap) (* signifies that driver lead feature race for at least one lap – 1 point awarded)

Year	Team	Car	1	2	3	4	5	6	7	8	9	10	11	12	13	14	15	16	17	18	19	20	21	22	23	24	25	26	27	28	Pos	Pts
2006	Sherrin Motor Sport	Porsche 911 GT3 Cup	ADE; R1	ADE; R2	ADE; R3	WAK; R4	WAK; R5	WAK; R6	HID; R7	HID; R8	HID; R9	ORA; R10	ORA; R11	ORA; R12	SAN; R13	SAN; R14	SAN; R15	BAT; R16	BAT; R17	BAT; R18	SUR; R19	SUR; R20	SUR; R21	PHI; R22	PHI; R23	PHI; R24					6th	633
2007	Sherrin Motor Sport	Porsche 911 GT3 Cup	ADE; R1	ADE; R2	ADE; R3	WIN; R4	WIN; R5	WIN; R6	HID; R7	HID; R8	HID; R9	QLD; R10	QLD; R11	QLD; R12	ORA; R13	ORA; R14	ORA; R15	SAN; R16	SAN; R17	SAN; R18	BAT; R19	BAT; R20	BAT; R21	SUR; R22	SUR; R23	SUR; R24					8th	533
2008	Sherrin Motor Sport	Porsche 911 GT3 Cup	ADE; R1	ADE; R2	ADE; R3	ALB; R4	ALB; R5	ALB; R6	ALB; R7	WAK; R8	WAK; R9	WAK; R10	BAR; R11	BAR; R12	BAR; R13	SAN; R14	SAN; R15	SAN; R16	QLD; R17	QLD; R18	QLD; R19	PHI; R20	PHI; R21	PHI; R22	BAT; R23	BAT; R24	BAT; R25	SUR; R26	SUR; R27	SUR; R28	3rd	1017
2014	JBS Australia	Porsche 911 GT3 Cup	ADE; R1	ADE; R2	ADE; R3	ALB; R4	ALB; R5	ALB; R6	PHI; R7	PHI; R8	TOW; R9	TOW; R10	TOW; R11	SMP; R12	SMP; R13	SMP; R14	SAN; R15	SAN; R16	SAN; R17	BAT; R18; 3	BAT; R19; 5	BAT; R20; 18	SUR; R21; 1	SUR; R22; 4	SUR; R23; 3						19th	218
2015	Finance Ezi Racing	Porsche 911 GT3 Cup	ADE; R1; 2	ADE; R2; 4	ADE; R3; 3	ALB; R4; 5	ALB; R5; 8	ALB; R6; 6	PHI; R7; Ret	PHI; R8; 16	**TOW**; **R9**; **3**	TOW; R10; 2	TOW; R11; 17	SMP; R12; 5	SMP; R13; 3	SMP; R14; 3	SAN; R15; 4	SAN; R16; 4	SAN; R17; 5	BAT; R18; 1	**BAT**; **R19**; **2**	**SUR**; **R20**; **2**	SUR; R21; 2	SUR; R22; 2							**2nd**	**892**
2022	EMA Motorsport	Porsche 992 GT3 Cup	ALB; R1; 12	ALB; R2; 8	ALB; R3; 10	ALB; R4; 5	WIN; R5; 3	WIN; R6; 1	**WIN**; **R7**; **2**	HID; R8; 11	HID; R9; 10	HID; R10; 12	TOW; R11; 17	TOW; R12; 12	TOW; R13; 8	BEN; R14; 4	BEN; R15; 3	BEN; R16; 2	SAN; R17; 9	SAN; R18; 4	SAN; R19; 4	BAT; R20; 6	BAT; R21; C	BAT; R22; C	SUR; R23; 2	SUR; R24; 3	SUR; R25; 3				**3rd**	**777**
2023	Earl Bamber Motorsport	Porsche 992 GT3 Cup	ALB; R1; C	ALB; R2; 6	ALB; R3; 5	HID; R4; 12	HID; R5; 10	HID; R6; 6	TOW; R7; Ret	TOW; R8; DNS	TOW; R9; DNS	BEN; R10	BEN; R11	BEN; R12	SAN; R13; 4	SAN; R14; 5	SAN; R15; 8	BAT; R16; 7	BAT; R17; 4	BAT; R18; 15	SUR; R19	SUR; R20	SUR; R21	ADE; R22	ADE; R23	ADE; R24					15th	323
2024	TekworkX Motorsport	Porsche 992 GT3 Cup	ALB; R1; 8	ALB; R2; Ret	ALB; R3; 4	**TAU**; **R4**; **1**	**TAU**; **R5**; **1**	**TAU**; **R6**; **2**	HID; R7; 4	HID; R8; 14	HID; R9; 6	SMP; R10; 3	SMP; R11; 5	SMP; R12; 3	SAN; R13; 5	SAN; R14; 3	SAN; R15; 7	BAT; R16; 2	BAT; R17; 2	BAT; R18; 1	SUR; R19; 3	SUR; R20; 2	SUR; R21; 2	ADE; R22; Ret	ADE; R23; 3	ADE; R24; Ret					**2nd**	**934**
2025	TekworkX Motorsport	Porsche 992 GT3 Cup	SMP; R1; 7	SMP; R2; 8	SMP; R3; 8	ALB; R4; 8	ALB; R5; 8	ALB; R6; 5	HID; R7	HID; R8	HID; R9	QLD; R10	QLD; R11	QLD; R12	BEN; R13	BEN; R14	BEN; R15	BAT; R16	BAT; R17	BAT; R18	SUR; R19	SUR; R20	SUR; R21	ADE; R22	ADE; R23	ADE; R24					8th*	155*

=== Complete Bathurst 12 Hour results ===
Year	Team	Co-drivers	Car	Class	Laps	Overall position	Class position
2007	(Australia) Australian Motor Finance	(Australia) Shaun Juniper (Australia) Andrew Moffat	BMW 130i	C	247	6th	**1st**
2011	(Australia) Lago Racing	(Australia) Roger Lago (Australia) Wayne Park	Porsche 997 GT3 Cup	B	282	5th	**1st**
2012	(Australia) Lago Racing	(Australia) Roger Lago (Australia) Wayne Park	Lamborghini Gallardo LP600	A	103	DNF	
2013	(Australia) Lago Racing	(Australia) Roger Lago (Netherlands) Peter Kox	Lamborghini Gallardo LP560	A	11	DNF	
2014	(Australia) Lago Racing	(Australia) Roger Lago (Netherlands) Peter Kox	Lamborghini Gallardo LP560	A	5	DNF	
2015	(Australia) Lago Racing	(Australia) Roger Lago (Australia) Steve Owen	Lamborghini Gallardo LP600	AP	268	7th	5th
2016	(Australia) Bentley Team M-Sport	(Spain) Andy Soucek (Belgium) Maxime Soulet	Bentley Continental GT3	AP	293	7th	6th
2017	(Australia) Lago Racing	(Australia) Roger Lago (Australia) Steve Owen	Lamborghini Gallardo R-EX	AAM	288	6th	**2nd**
2018	(Australia) Lago Racing	(Australia) Roger Lago (Australia) Steve Owen	Lamborghini Gallardo R-EX	APA	267	13th	6th
2019	(Australia) Matt Stone Racing	(Australia) Roger Lago (Australia) Todd Hazelwood	Audi R8 LMS	APA	308	10th	**2nd**
2022	(Australia) Supabarn Racing	(Australia) James Koundouris (Australia) Theo Koundouris (Australia) Paul Stokell	Audi R8 LMS Evo II	S	283	9th	**1st**
2023	(Australia) Melbourne Performance Centre	(Australia) James Koundouris (Australia) Theo Koundouris (Australia) Jonathon Webb	Audi R8 LMS Evo II	S	308	16th	4th
2024	(Australia) Tigani Motorsport	(Australia) James Koundouris (Australia) Theo Koundouris (Australia) Jonathon Webb	Mercedes-AMG GT3 Evo	S	268	15th	**3rd**

=== Complete Bathurst 6 Hour results ===
Year	Team	Co-drivers	Car	Class	Laps	Pos.	Class pos.
2019	(Australia) Aussie Wide Builders	(Australia) Geoffrey Russell	BMW 135i E82	B	128	4th	**1st**
2021	(Australia) Sherrin Rentals	(Australia) Grant Sherrin	BMW M4	X	120	**3rd**	**3rd**
2022	(Australia) Begg Motorsport	(Australia) K.Begg (Australia) Nash Morris	BMW M4	X	52	DNF	
2023	(Australia) Begg Motorsport	(Australia) K.Begg (Australia) R.Gooley	BMW M4	X	52	DNF	
2024	(Australia) McLennan Motorsport	(Australia) Tom McLennan (Australia) Shane Smollen	BMW M4	X	120	9th	5th
2025	(Australia) Macpro Properties	(Australia) Tom McLennan	BMW M4	X	121	7th	5th
