= 2000 Australian GT Production Car Championship =

The 2000 Australian GT Production Car Championship was a CAMS sanctioned motor racing title open to GT Production Cars. The championship, which was the fifth Australian GT Production Car Championship, was the first to be contested without the “exotic” cars such as Porsches and Ferraris which competed in a separate Australian Nations Cup Championship for the first time in the year 2000.

== Calendar ==
The championship was contested over an eight-round series.

- Round 1, Barbagallo Raceway, Western Australia, 19 March
- Round 2, Adelaide Parklands Circuit, South Australia, 8 April
- Round 3, Eastern Creek International Raceway, New South Wales, 30 April
- Round 4, Canberra Street Circuit, Australian Capital Territory, 10 June
- Round 5, Queensland Raceway, Ipswich, Queensland, 2 July
- Round 6, Oran Park, New South Wales, 30 July
- Round 7, Calder Park Raceway, Victoria 20 August
- Round 8, Sandown International Motor Raceway, Victoria, 8 October

The Adelaide Parklands round was staged over a single race and all other rounds utilised a two race format.

== Results ==
=== Drivers – Outright results ===
Position	Driver	No	Car	Entrant	R1	R2	R3	R4	R5	R6	R7	R8	Total
1	Mark King	34	Mitsubishi Lancer RS EVO V	Mark King	3	8	15	30	30	16	25	6	133
2	Ric Shaw	35	Mazda RX-7	Ric Shaw	31	16	28	13	15	–	–	–	103
3	Bob Hughes	15	Mitsubishi Lancer RS EVO V	Bob Hughes	24	6	5	18	6	–	11	6	76
4	Ed Aitken	8	HSV VTII GTS	Ed Aitken	–	–	–	–	13	9	26	27	75
5	Graham Alexander	57	Mitsubishi Lancer RS EVO V	Graham Alexander	–	–	–	1	24	20	24	2	71
6	Gary Deane	91	Subaru Impreza WRX STi	Jim McKnoulty	–	2	6	22	4	–	14	14	62
	Wayne Boatwright	60	Subaru Impreza WRX STi	NSW WRX Club	–	–	–	–	1	27	12	22	62
8	Grant Kenny	50	Subaru Impreza WRX STi	Scott Jacob	1	10	14	14	–	7	1	11	58
9	Scott Jacob	51	Subaru Impreza WRX STi	Scott Jacob	–	–	4	9	7	20	8	8	56
10	Barry Morcom	23	Mazda RX-7	Barry Morcom	5	12	22	6	4	2	1	3	55
11	Don Pulver	96	Subaru Impreza WRX	Don Pulver	6	–	3	9	7	13	–	–	38
12	Dennis Gilbert	38	Mitsubishi Lancer RS EVO V	Dennis Gilbert	16	–	6	2	–	5	5	–	34
13	Tony Scott	97	HSV VTII GTS	Ross Dillon	–	–	–	–	–	–	–	25	25
14	Trevor Haines	61	Subaru Impreza WRX STi	Trevor Haines	11	–	8	5	–	–	–	–	24
15	Graham Stones	72	Mazda RX-7		20	–	–	–	–	–	–	–	20
	Wayne Wakefield	30	Mazda RX-7	Peter Roma	–	–	–	–	20	–	–	–	20
17	Phil Kirkham	71	Mazda RX-7	Maz Motor Wreckers	5	1	8	–	2	–	2	–	18
18	Jim McKnoulty	91	Subaru Impreza WRX STi	Jim McKnoulty	–	–	–	–	–	12	–	2	14
19	Wayne Russell	27	BMW 323i	Wayne Russell	–	4	7	–	–	1	–	–	12
20	Scott Anderson	19	Mitsubishi Lancer RS EVO V	Sharon Kay Wood	–	–	–	–	–	–	–	7	7
21	Colin Osborne	13	Toyota MR2 Bathurst	Osborne Motorsport	–	5	–	–	–	–	–	–	5
	Wayne Phipps	39	Mazda RX-7		5	–	–	–	–	–	–	–	5
23	Ross Dillon	97	HSV VT Clubsport R8	Ross Dillon	4	–	–	–	–	–	–	–	4
	Peter Floyd	87	Mazda RX-7	Peter Floyd	–	–	–	3	–	1	–	–	4
25	David Wood	16	Honda Integra Type R	Peter Phelan	–	–	2	1	–	–	–	–	3
	Roland Hill	33	Holden VS Commodore Executive	Roland Hill	–	–	3	–	–	–	–	–	3
	Wayne Murphy	31	Toyota MR2 Bathurst	Osborne Motorsport	–	3	–	–	–	–	–	–	3
28	Clyde Lawrence	14	Subaru Impreza WRX		2	–	–	–	–	–	–	–	2
	Scott Loadsman	62	Holden VT Commodore SS	Scott Loadsman	–	–	2	–	–	–	–	–	2

=== Drivers – Class results ===
Position	Driver	No	Car	Entrant	Total
	Class A : High Performance Cars				
1	Mark King	34	Mitsubishi Lancer RS EVO V	Mark King	133
2	Ric Shaw	35	Mazda RX-7	Ric Shaw	103
3	Bob Hughes	15	Mitsubishi Lancer RS EVO V	Bob Hughes	76
4	Ed Aitken	8	HSV VTII GTS	Ed Aitken	75
5	Graham Alexander	57	Mitsubishi Lancer RS EVO V	Graham Alexander	71
6	Gary Deane	91	Subaru Impreza WRX STi	Jim McKnoulty	67
7	Wayne Boatwright	60	Subaru Impreza WRX STi	NSW WRX Club	62
8	Grant Kenny	50	Subaru Impreza WRX STi	Scott Jacob	59
9	Scott Jacob	51	Subaru Impreza WRX STi	Scott Jacob	56
10	Barry Morcom	23	Mazda RX-7	Barry Morcom	55
11	Don Pulver	96	Subaru Impreza WRX	Don Pulver	41
12	Dennis Gilbert	38	Mitsubishi Lancer RS EVO V	Dennis Gilbert	36
13	Tony Scott	97	HSV VTII GTS	Ross Dillon	25
14	Trevor Haines	61	Subaru Impreza WRX STi	Trevor Haines	24
15	Phil Kirkham	71	Mazda RX-7	Maz Motor Wreckers	22
16	Graham Stones	72	Mazda RX-7		20
	Wayne Wakefield	30	Mazda RX-7	Peter Roma	20
18	Jim McKnoulty	91	Subaru Impreza WRX STi	Jim McKnoulty	14
19	Scott Anderson	19	Mitsubishi Lancer RS EVO V	Sharon Kay Wood	7
20	Wayne Phipps	39	Mazda RX-7		5
	Clyde Lawrence	14	Subaru Impreza WRX		5
	Charlie Senese	58	Subaru Impreza WRX	Charlie Senese	5
	Ross Dillon	97	HSV VT Clubsport R8	Ross Dillon	5
	Peter Floyd	87	Mazda RX-7	Peter Floyd	5
25	Ken Douglas				4
26	Sharyn Wood	19	Mitsubishi Lancer RS EVO V	Sharyn Wood	2
	Class B : Sports Touring Cars				
1	David Wood	16	Honda Integra Type R	Peter Phelan	202
2	Wayne Russell	27	BMW 323i	Challenge Recruitment	153
3	Peter Boylan	7	Honda Integra Type R	Peter Boylan	91
4	Colin Osborne	13	Toyota MR2 Bathurst	Osborne Motorsport	90
5	Danny Brian	26	BMW 323i	Challenge Recruitment	66
6	Anton Mechtler	26 & 4	BMW 323i & Toyota MR2 GT	Anton Mechtler	37
7	Wayne Murphy	31	Toyota MR2 Bathurst	Osborne Motorsport	32
8	Vern Norrgard	31	Toyota MR2 Bathurst	Osborne Motorsport	31
9	Megan Kirkham	54	Mazda MX5 Sports	Maz Motor Wreckers	26
10	John Cowley	2	Honda Integra Type R	John Cowley	25
11	Ross Palmer	7	Honda Integra Type R	Peter Boylan	24
12	Peter McKay	45	Toyota Celica VVTL-i	Toyota Motor Corp	18
13	Neal Bates	45	Toyota Celica VVTL-i	Toyota Motor Corp	16
14	Sue Hughes	54	Mazda MX5 Sports & BMW 323i	Maz Motor Wreckers	12
	Greg McPherson	44	Honda Integra Type R	Coad's Pty Ltd	12
16	Len Cave	54	Mazda MX5 Sports	Maz Motor Wreckers	9
	Ian McAlister	66	Honda Integra Type R	Ian McAlister	9
	Class C : V8 Touring Cars				
1	James Philip	22	Ford AU Falcon XR8	James Philip	150
2	Warren Millett	18	Holden VT Commodore SS	Warren Millett	146
3	Scott Loadsman	62	Holden VT Commodore SS	Scott Loadsman	122
4	Craig Dontas	85	Holden VT Commodore SS	Makita Australia	97
5	Roland Hill	33	Holden VS Commodore Executive	Roland Hill	70
6	Brian Carr	64	Ford AU Falcon XR8	Brian Carr	47
7	John McIlroy	95	Ford AU Falcon XR8	John McIlroy	30
8	Mark Cohen	55	Holden VT Commodore SS	Mark Cohen	22
9	Richard Winston	24	Holden VT Commodore	Richard Winston	16
10	Denis Cribbin	33	Holden VS Commodore	Roland Hill	12
	Class D : Six Cylinder Touring Cars				
1	Daryl Coon	70	Ford AU Falcon XR6	Daryl Coon	203
2	Robert Chadwick	20	Mitsubishi TH Magna Sports	Robert Chadwick	167
3	David Ratcliff	6	Toyota Camry CSi	Nepean EFI	152
4	Calvin Gardiner	43	Mazda 626	Calvin Gardiner	61
5	Barry Tanton	32	Ford AU Falcon XR6	Guy Gibbons	44
6	Jim Myhill	93	Mitsubishi TH Magna	Jim Myhill	38
7	Guy Gibbons	32	Ford AU Falcon XR6	Guy Gibbons	28
8	Trent Ulmer	93	Mitsubishi TH Magna	Jim Myhill	26
9	Sue Hughes	75	Ford EL Falcon XR6	Buy-A-Drive	21
10	Tom Watkinson		Mazda 626	Calvin Gardiner	16
11	Garry Mennell	46	Ford EL Falcon XR6	Darell Dixon	11
	Class E : Four Cylinder Touring Cars				
1	Kosi Kalaitzidis	21	Proton M21 Coupe & Satria GTi	Kosi Kalaitzidis	194
2	Nathan Thomas	37	Suzuki Swift GTi	Nathan Thomas	156
3	Warren Luff	36	Peugeot 306 Style	Nothshore Rallysport	154
4	Melinda Price	29	Holden Vectra GL	Gibson Motorsport	54
5	Sam Newman	17	Holden Vectra GL	Gibson Motorsport	43
6	David Russell	67	Suzuki Swift GTi	John Dickinson	40
7	Carol Jackson	10	Honda Civic VTi-R	Pace Racing	37
8	David Crowe	49	Suzuki Swift GTi	David Crowe	20
9	Michael Taylor	29	Holden Vectra GL	Gibson Motorsport	16
	Michael Hopp	65	Toyota Starlet	HARE Motorsport	16
11	Paul Buda	74	Suzuki Swift GTi	VW Parts Service	14
12	Les Walmsley	74	Suzuki Swift GTi	VW Parts Service	12

=== Manufacturers – Outright results ===
Position	Manufacturer	Total
1	Holden	675
2	Mitsubishi	556
3	Ford	538
4	Honda	399
5	Toyota	392
6	Mazda	352
7	Subaru	338
8	Suzuki	241
9	BMW	225
10	Proton	194
11	Peugeot	154

=== Manufacturers – Class results ===
Position	Manufacturer	R1	R2	R3	R4	R5	R6	R7	R8	Total
	Class A : High Performance Cars									
1	Subaru	20	18	46	59	19	79	35	62	338
2	Mitsubishi	43	16	28	51	60	41	65	21	325
3	Mazda	66	33	58	23	41	3	7	3	234
4	Holden	4	–			13	10	26	25	78
	Class B : Sports Touring Cars									
1	Honda	53	13	33	53	28	44	62	76	362
2	BMW	22	18	36	34	37	27	31	20	225
3	Toyota	22	25	34	25	18	41	34	25	224
4	Mazda	11	–	5	–	6	9	4	6	41
	Class C : V8 Touring Cars									
1	Holden	55	22	97	76	51	73	54	56	484
2	Ford	–	15	6	21	40	35	63	47	227
	Class D : Six Cylinder Touring Cars									
1	Ford	39	15	47	25	47	47	33	58	311
2	Mitsubishi	27	18	22	26	32	24	43	39	231
3	Toyota	25	12	23	24	24	6	22	16	152
4	Mazda	–	6	16	16	–	20	15	4	77
	Class E : Four Cylinder Touring Cars									
1	Suzuki	42	6	39	22	42	50	20	20	241
5	Proton	27	15	18	31	20	22	31	30	194
2	Peugeot	–	12	30	12	20	31	24	25	154
3	Holden	28	18	30	21	–	–	16	–	113
4	Honda	–	–	–	16	21	–	–	–	37
6	Toyota	–	–	–	–	–	–	–	16	16
