= Proton Putra =

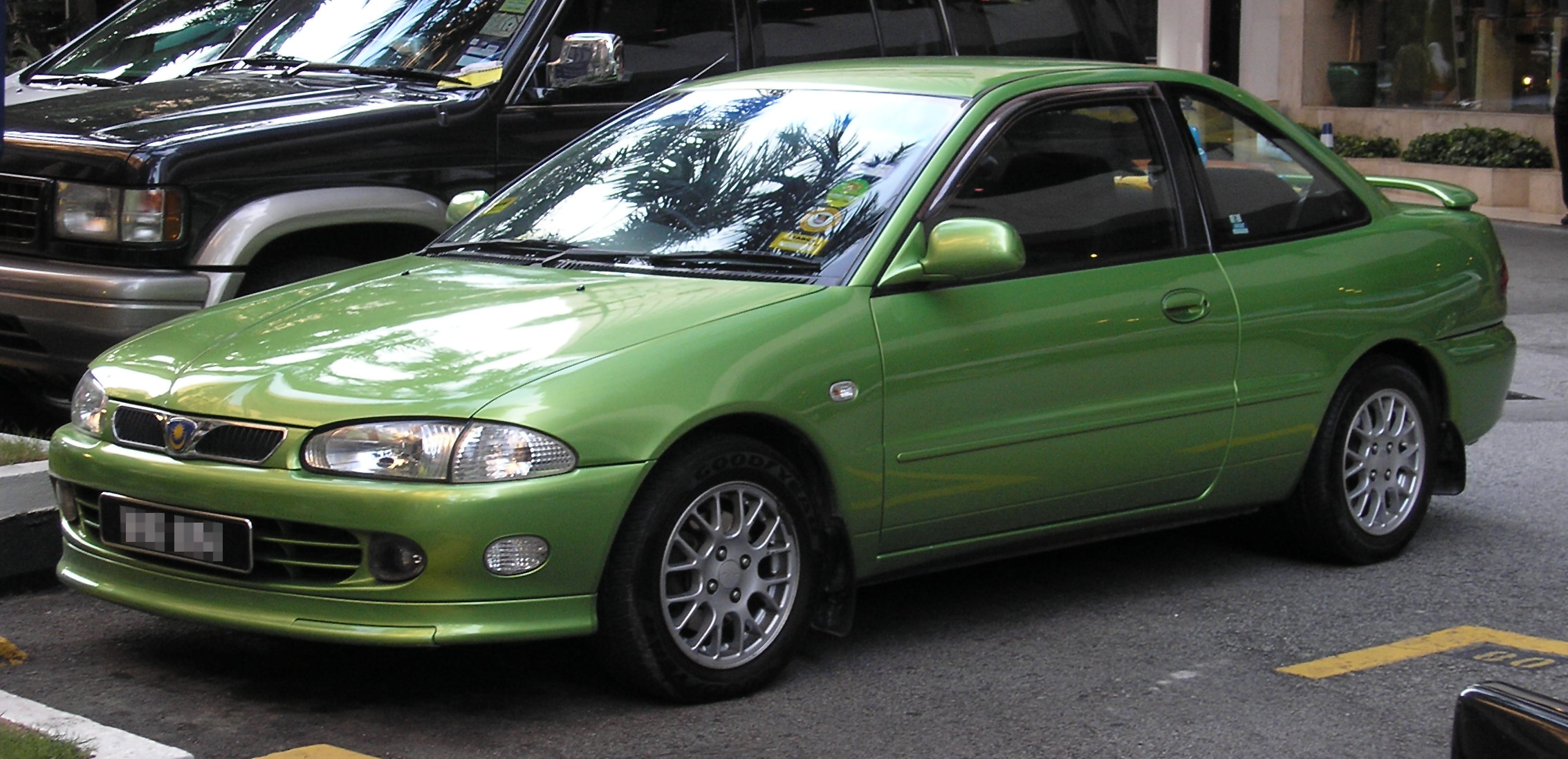

Overview
- Manufacturer: Proton
- Also called: Proton Coupé R (UK); Proton M21
- Production: 1996–2001; 2004
- Assembly: Malaysia: Pekan, Pahang (AMM)

Body and chassis
- Class: Sport compact car
- Body style: 2-door coupé
- Layout: Front-engine, front-wheel drive
- Related: Mitsubishi Mirage Asti

Powertrain
- Engine: 1.8 L 4G93 DOHC I4
- Transmission: 5-speed manual 4-speed automatic

Dimensions
- Wheelbase: 2,440 mm (96.1 in)
- Length: 4,225 mm (166.3 in)
- Width: 1,690 mm (66.5 in)
- Height: 1,365 mm (53.7 in)
- Kerb weight: 1,007 kg (2,220.1 lb)

The Proton Putra (Malay, "son" or "prince") is a front wheel drive sports coupe produced by Malaysian automobile company Proton. Production of the Putra started in late 1996 and ended in 2001, but was briefly relaunched in limited numbers in 2004 for the domestic market. The reasoning for the relaunch is the clearing of the remaining stocks available at the factory.

== Specifications ==
Powertrain Engine & Performance
Engine	Mitsubishi 4G93P DOHC
Maximum Speed (km/h)	205 km/h
Acceleration 0–100 km/h (sec)	9.9
Maximum Output hp(kW)/rpm	140.13 PS (138.00 bhp) (102.82 kW) @ 6000rpm
Maximum Torque (Nm/rpm)	164Nm (121 lbf/ft) @ 5500rpm
Full tank capacity (Litre)	n/a
Tyres & Rims	F 185/60 HR 14
Chassis
Power Steering	Yes
Suspension (Front/Rear)	McPherson/ Multi-link suspension
Brake (Front/Rear)	F/R Ventilated Disc/Di-S

== Engine ==
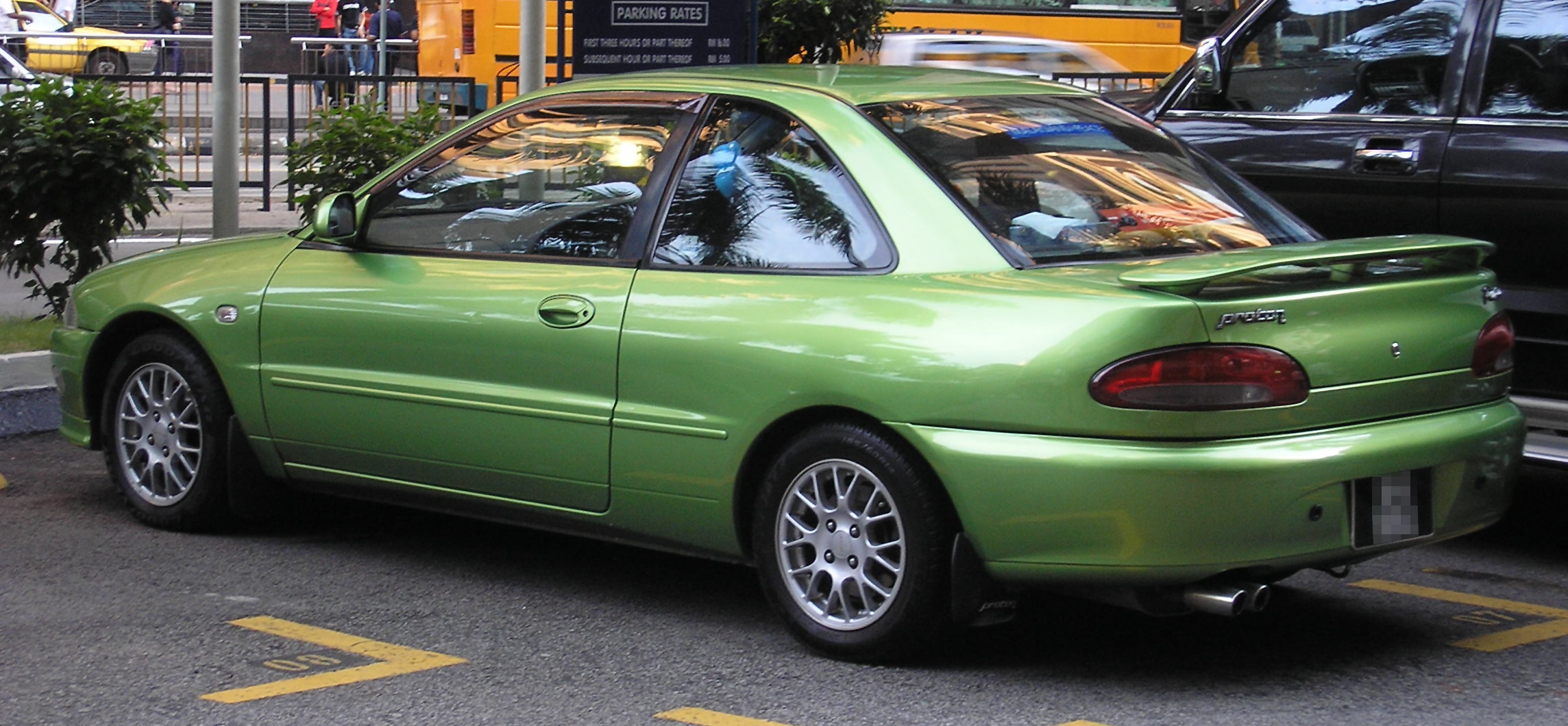
Proton Putra rear

The Putra's power-plant is derived from a Mitsubishi 4G93P DOHC engine, with the P representing Proton.

== Export market ==
In the United Kingdom and Australia, the Putra was sold as the Proton Coupé or Proton M21, but sales were not strong as it was considered very bland looking and being aesthetically similar to the older 1992-1995 Lancer series 5 or Mitsubishi Lancer CC as it is known in Australia. Additionally, it was considered dull to drive compared to more "adventurous" competitors like the Ford Puma and Vauxhall Tigra.

== Design ==
Based on Mitsubishi's Fourth generation Mirage Asti Lancer, the Putra is a two-door coupé with front end styling similar to that of both the Proton Wira and the first generation Proton Satria. The rear, however, features a more original design with only the taillights bearing similarities to those of the first generation Satria and fourth generation Lancer.

The vehicle is almost an exact replica of the 1992-1995 4th-generation Lancer both aesthetically and mechanically. The vehicle has headlights and taillights that are interchangeable with those of the Lancer. The Putra, however, is equipped with a Mitsubishi DOHC 4G93 engine and comes with a slightly different front bumper and fenders that make the indicators less interchangeable with those on the Mitsubishi Lancer.

=== Interior ===
The Putra's standard equipment included Recaro N-Joy seats, a leather Momo Daytona 4 steering and leather Momo gear knob. However, during the relaunch units of the Putras in Malaysia, the interior Recaros, Momo steering and gear knob ware not included as standard. The car instead it was refitted with normal seats and steering but was available with black interior.

== Sales ==
Year	Malaysia (Note: Figures based on registration)
2000	96
2001	392
2002	480
2003	400
2004	7
2005	24

== Putra WRC ==
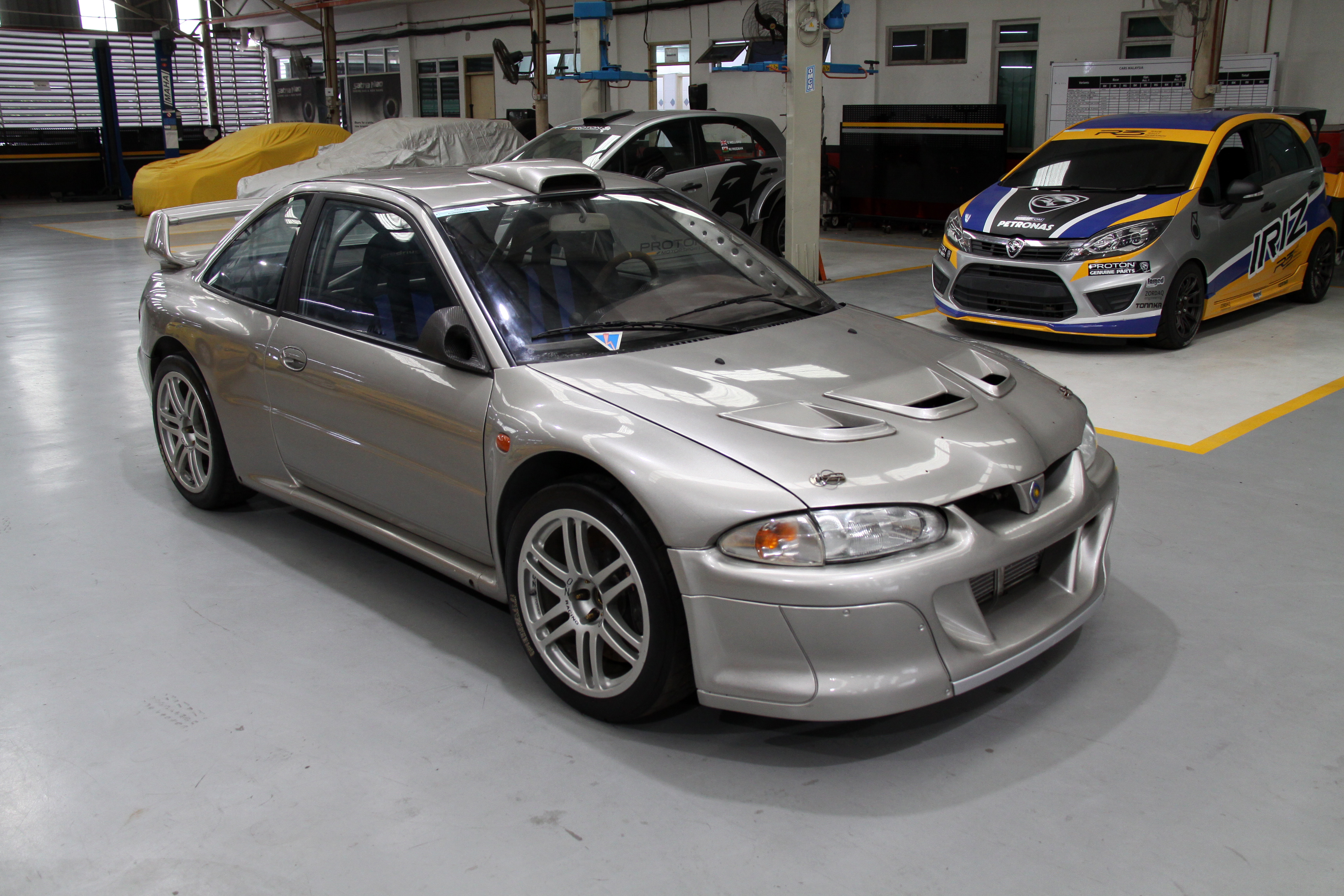
Proton Putra WRC at Proton Motorsports' facility

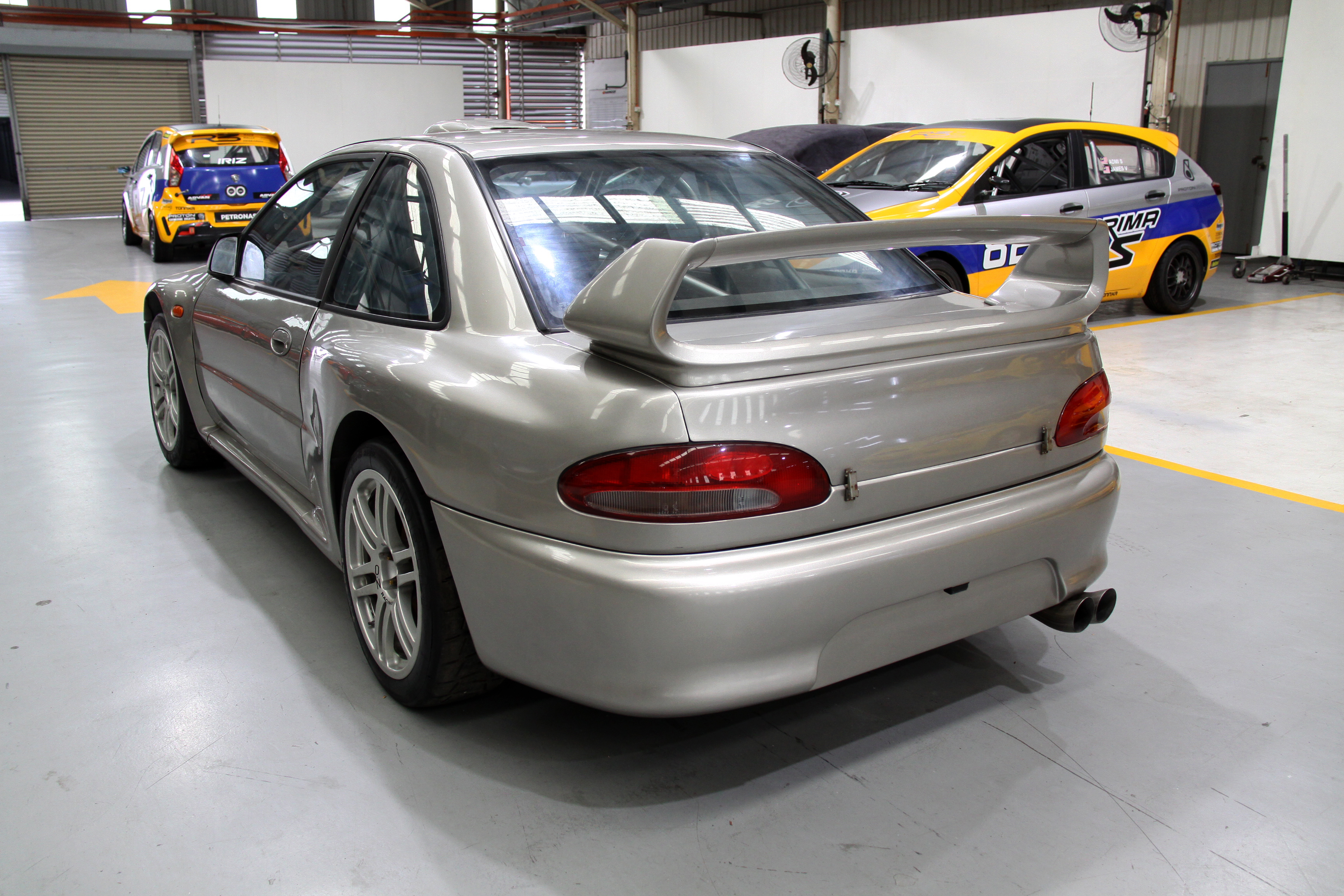
Rear view of the Proton Putra WRC

The Proton Putra WRC was a concept car developed by Proton and Prodrive for the 1997 World Rally Championship. The car is powered by a Prodrive-modified Mitsubishi 4G93T producing 300hp (304ps). The car sits on 18-inch OZ Racing wheels wrapped in Pirelli tyres. Contrary to popular belief, only 1 unit of the actual WRC car was built and it currently resides in the Proton Motorsports Collection. The second unit is a show car based on a production unit, wearing a similar looking body kit but with smaller wheel arches.
