= Proton Satria =

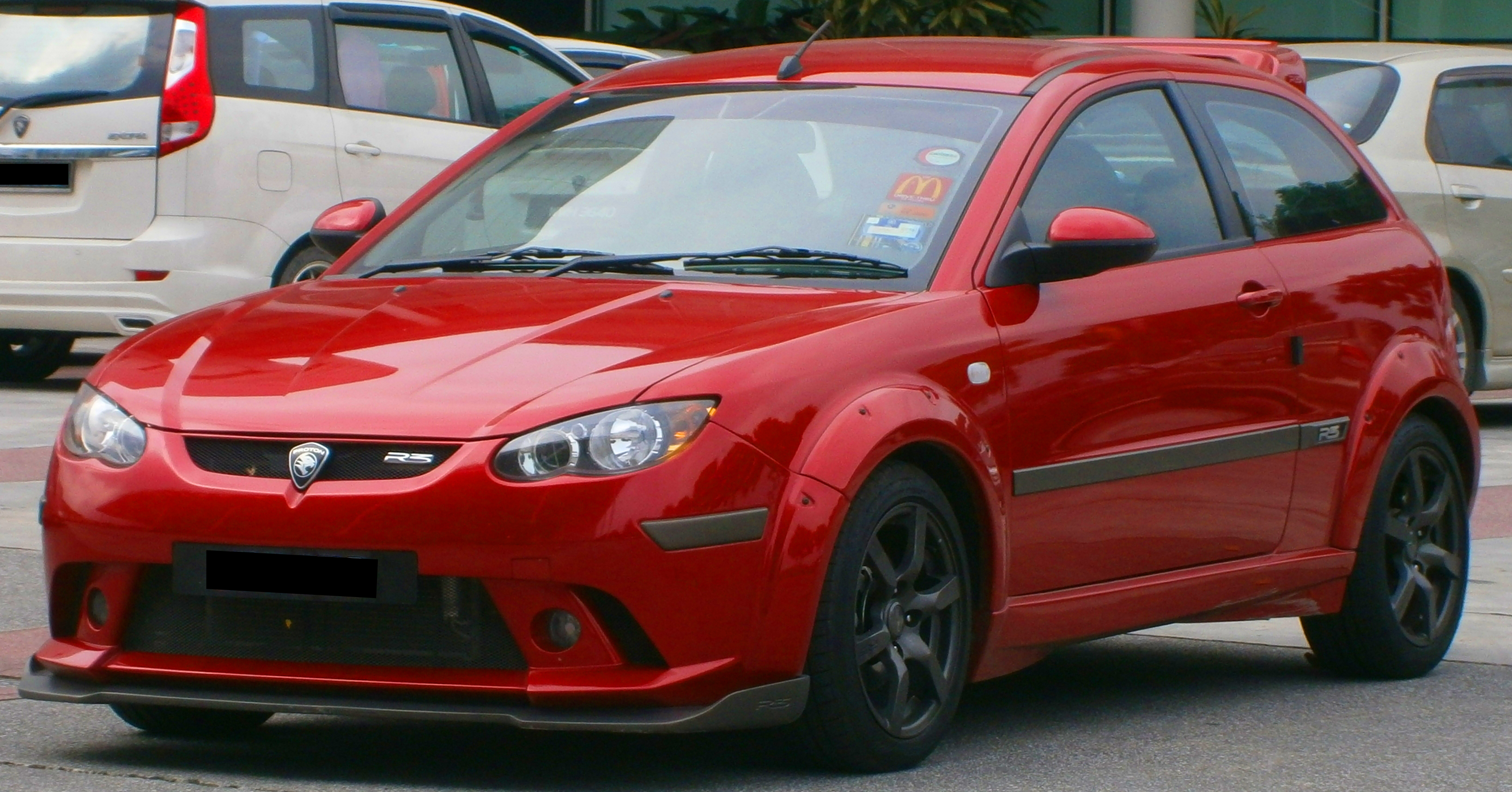

Overview
- Manufacturer: Proton
- Production: 1994–2015
- Assembly: Malaysia: Pekan (AMM, early units); Malaysia: Shah Alam (PONSB, later units); Malaysia: Proton City (PTMSB, 2006–07/2011); Malaysia: Shah Alam (PONSB, 11/2011–2015)

Body and chassis
- Class: Supermini; Sport compact
- Body style: 3-door hatchback

The Proton Satria is a hatchback automobile produced by Malaysian manufacturer Proton from 1994 to 2005 in the first generation model and from 2006 to 2015 in the Satria Replacement Model (SRM), known as the Proton Satria Neo.

The name Satria which means knight in Sanskrit was chosen for Proton's 3-door hatchback to reflect the sportiness of the car.

== Satria (C96, C97, C98, C99; 1994–2006) ==
First generation
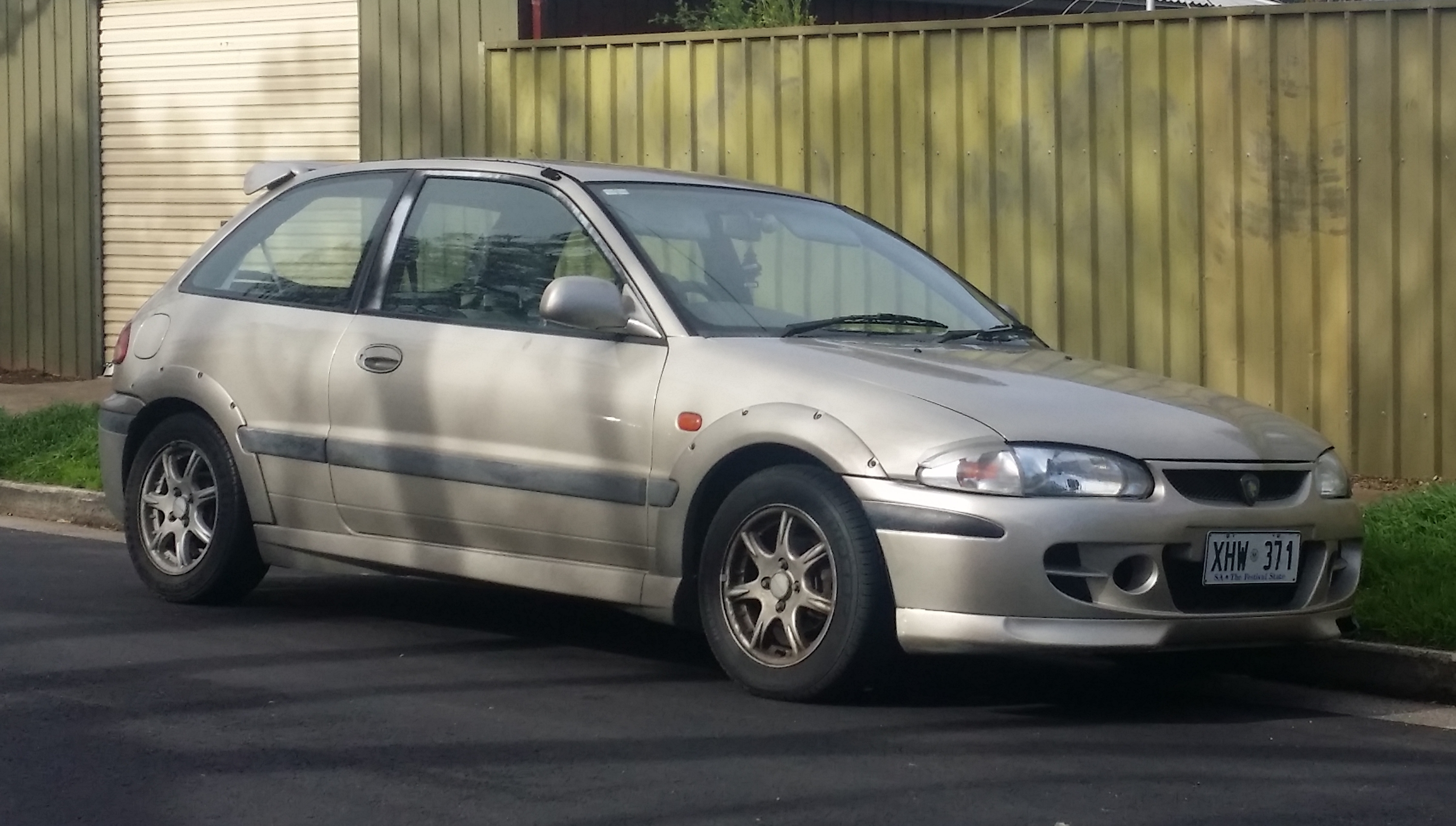
- 2001 Proton Satria XLS hatcbback

Overview
- Also called: Proton Compact; Proton Persona Compact; Proton 300 series
- Production: 1994–2005

Body and chassis
- Related: Mitsubishi Mirage / Colt

Powertrain
- Engine: 1.3 L 4G13 SOHC I4; 1.5 L 4G15 SOHC I4; 1.6 L 4G92 SOHC I4; 1.8 L 4G93 DOHC I4
- Transmission: 3-speed automatic (4G1 Series); 4-speed automatic (4G9 Series); 5-speed manual

Dimensions
- Wheelbase: 2,440 mm (96.1 in)
- Length: 3,995 mm (157.3 in)
- Width: 1,710 mm (67.3 in)
- Height: 1,365 mm (53.7 in)
- Curb weight: 1,005 kg (2,216 lb)

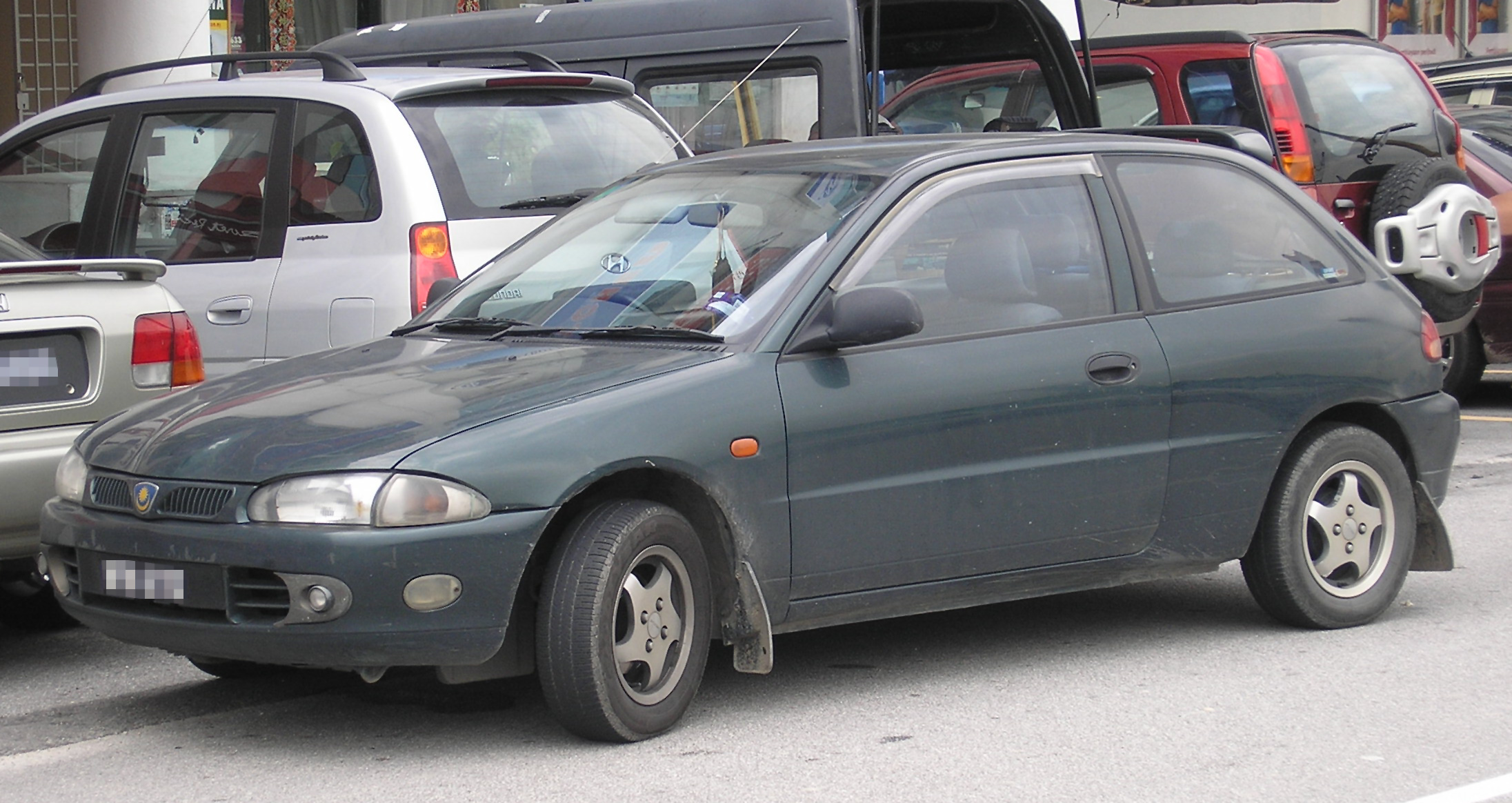

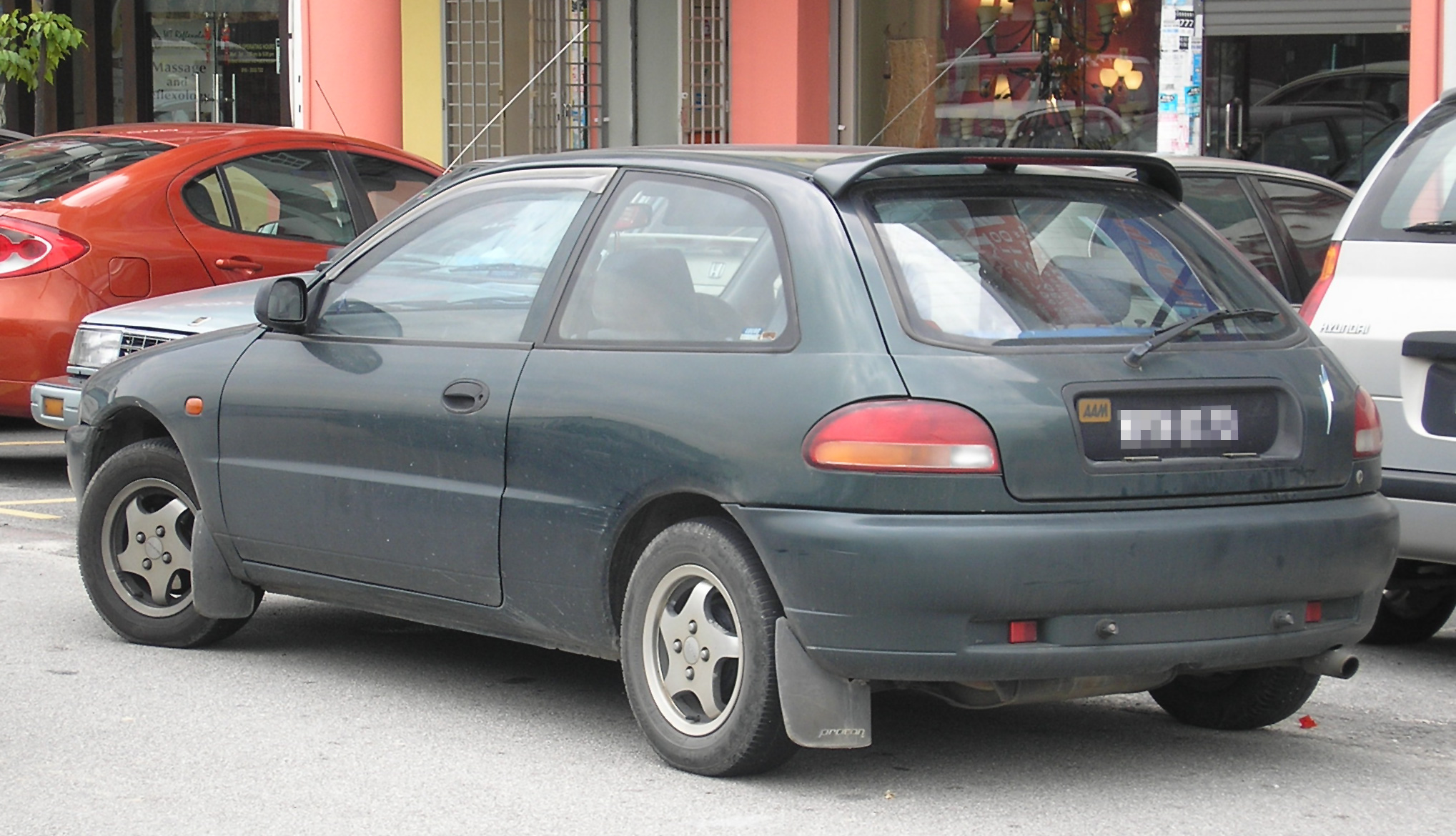
1996–2005 Proton Satria

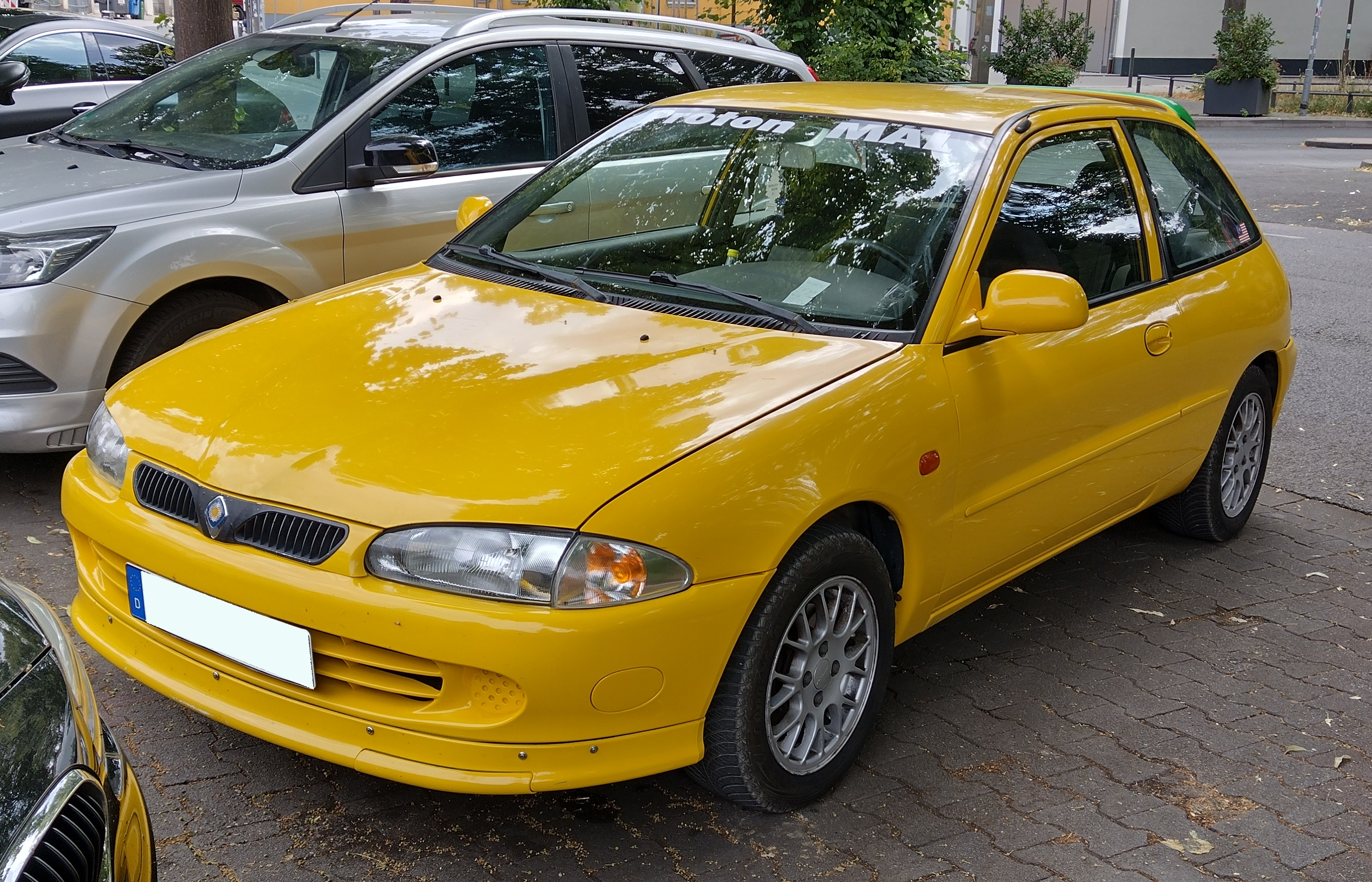
2000 Proton 316 GLSi Yellow 2 Edition (Germany)

The first generation Proton Satria, also marketed as the Proton Compact in the United Kingdom, and the Proton 300 Series in various continental European markets is a 3-door hatchback based on the fourth generation Mitsubishi Mirage / Colt. It was unveiled on 24 November 1994 as the result of a joint venture between Proton and Diversified Resources Bhd. (DRB), and was first imported to Europe during 1995. The Proton Satria was produced at Automotive Manufacturers Malaysia's (AMM) plant in Pekan, Pahang and was initially distributed by Usahasama Proton-DRB (USPD), a company in which Proton held a 30% stake in late 1994.

In Australia, the Satria was launched in 1997 with 3 variants originally on offer: 1.5 GL, 1.5 GLi and 1.6 XLi. All three variants was fuel injected. The car appeared as a regular prize on the Australian television game show Sale of the Century.

The Proton Satria was initially available in three variants at launch with two engine options, namely the old 12-valve carbureted 1.3-litre 4G13P unit from the Proton Saga and a newer 16-valve multipoint fuel injected 1.6-litre 4G92P unit. The old 12-valve carbureted 1.5-litre 4G15P, also from the Proton Saga was added to the range later in the Satria's production cycle. The 1.5 and 1.6-litre engines were fitted with either a 3-speed or 4-speed automatic transmission, and a 5-speed manual transmission was offered with all three engine configurations. On the exterior, the Proton Satria shared the vast majority of its front-end styling and interior parts and components with the Proton Wira, but the rear-end was left largely unchanged over the Mirage / Colt it was based on. The Proton Satria had a development cost of RM150 million in late 1994, and it was priced between RM38,000 and RM54,000 at launch.

Trim levels were LSi, GLi, GLSi and SEi. The base-specification LSi had the 1.3-litre 12-valve engine only: GLi versions got the 1.5-litre 12-valve engine in addition to the 1.3-litre: whilst GLSi and SEi versions got the 1.6 16v engine as well as the 1.5 12v.

A later facelift version featured a redesigned rear end, different from that of the original Mirage. These were launched in 1996 in Malaysia and later in other countries, and new XLi, S XLi and GTi trim levels were available. New 1.3 12v, 1.5 12v, and 1.6 16v petrol engines were available.

In 2004 in Malaysia, the Satria Special Edition was launched. Three variants were offered: 1.3 GL M/T, 1.5 GL M/T and 1.5 GL A/T. No mechanical change compared to regular Satria's. Rather changes were mostly cosmetic that included the headlights internal casing painted black, an addition of an engine cover, hollow race style headrests for the front seats, revised metre graphics, gunmetal finish for the dashboard centre cluster, aluminum pedal, and a yellow gear shifter base.

=== Satria GTi ===
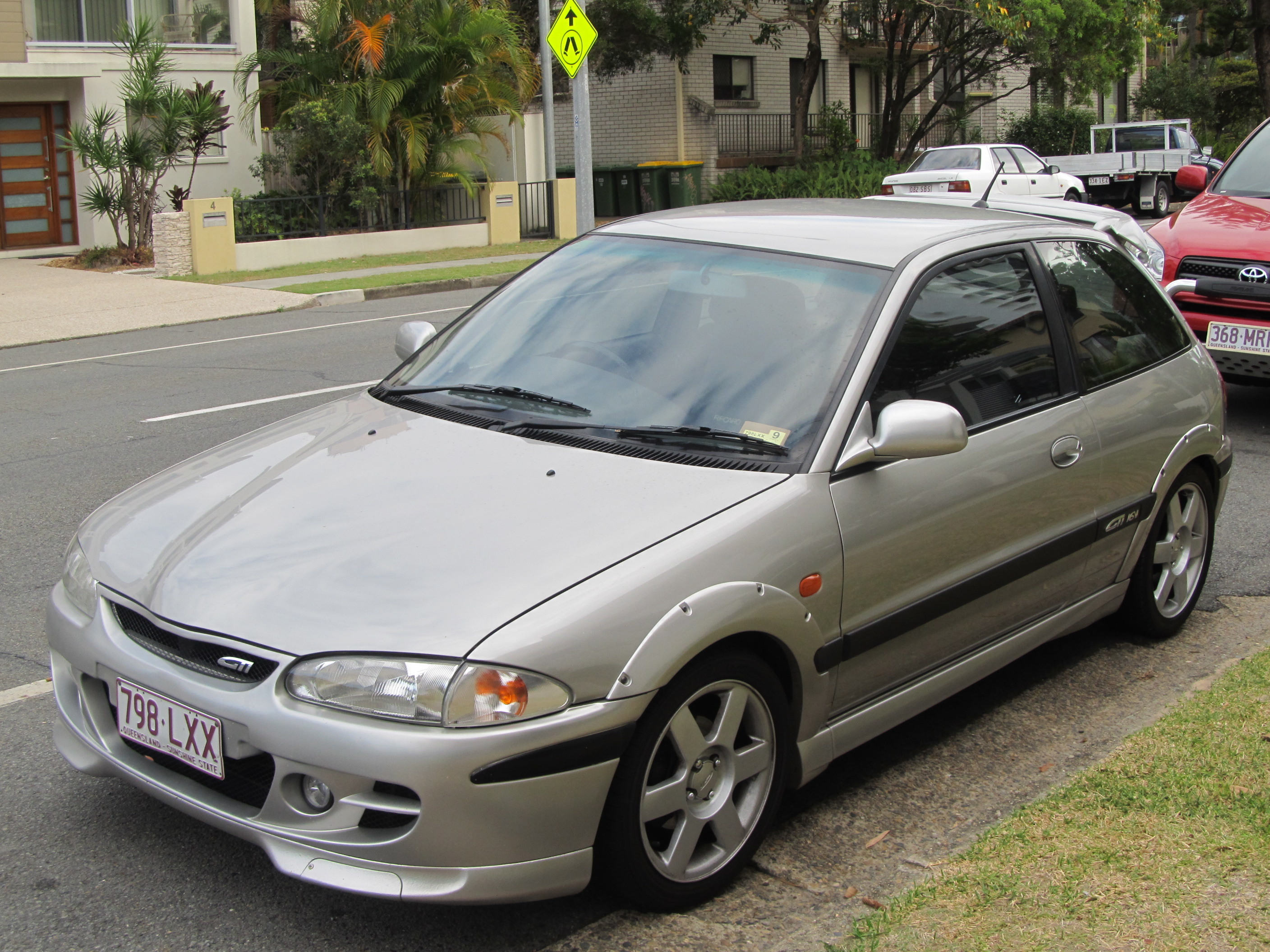
1998–2005 Proton Satria GTi (C99)

The Proton Satria GTi was launched in 1998 with a 138 bhp (103 kW) 1.8-litre Mitsubishi-sourced 4G93P engine ("P" for Proton), originally found in the Mitsubishi Lancer GSR, but here without the turbo and with an increase in compression to compensate. The Satria GTi was developed and re-engineered as a traditional hot hatch by Lotus in Hethel, England. The Satria GTi could accelerate from 0 to 60 mph in 8.5 seconds, making it among the fastest Proton production models ever produced. A new body kit was also adopted for better aerodynamics. The Satria GTi also wore a 'Handling by Lotus' badge on the rear hatch.

The engine and handling of the Satria GTi were progressively updated and revised between 1998 and 2005. The Mitsubishi version was produced from 1998 until mid-2002. The VDO (Siemens) version had been in production from mid-2002 until 2005 when Proton ceased production.

The Proton Satria GTi launched in the United Kingdom in November 1999 with a £14,500 price tag. It was equipped with air-conditioning, ABS, dual front power windows, electric mirrors and Recaro seats. Proton sold 160 units of the Satria GTi within its first six months in the U.K. A Satria GTi was trialled by Humberside Police's Vehicle Crime Unit for six months in 1999, operated alongside two Subaru Imprezas in the unit, with no orders resulting after the trial's conclusion.

Richard Hammond had reviewed the Proton Satria GTi alongside the more established Peugeot 206 GTi. The Satria GTi received more praise and approval as a traditional hot hatch, despite costing £500 more than the 206 GTi.

=== Cabriolet ===
A concept Proton Cabriolet was shown at the 1997 Frankfurt Motor Show, with ambitions for sales in the UK from 1999 but this did not happen.

=== Satria R3 ===
The Proton Satria R3 is a limited edition Satria sold in Malaysia. It was officially soft-launched on 4 October 2004, then made available for booking on 17 October 2004. The term R3 stands for Race, Rally, Research. R3 is a redefined version of the Satria GTi by Proton's Racing development team in collaboration with Lotus. It houses the same 1800 cc Mitsubishi 4G93P engine but has undergone some minor adjustments by Lotus handling. The body shell has been improved with double stitch welded monocoque chassis with front and rear strut tower brace bars. Body weight has been lightened as well. It comes with Recaro SR4 semi-bucket seats, both Momo steering wheel and gear knob.

=== Motorsport ===
Proton made a brief debut in the British Touring Car Championship towards the end of the 2001 Season with the Satria GTI. TH Motorsport ran Steven Wood in the car in the Production Class at Silverstone and the final meeting at Brands Hatch. He peaked with 7th in Class in Race 2 at Silverstone.

== Satria Neo (BS3, BS6; 2006–2015) ==
Second generation (Satria Neo)
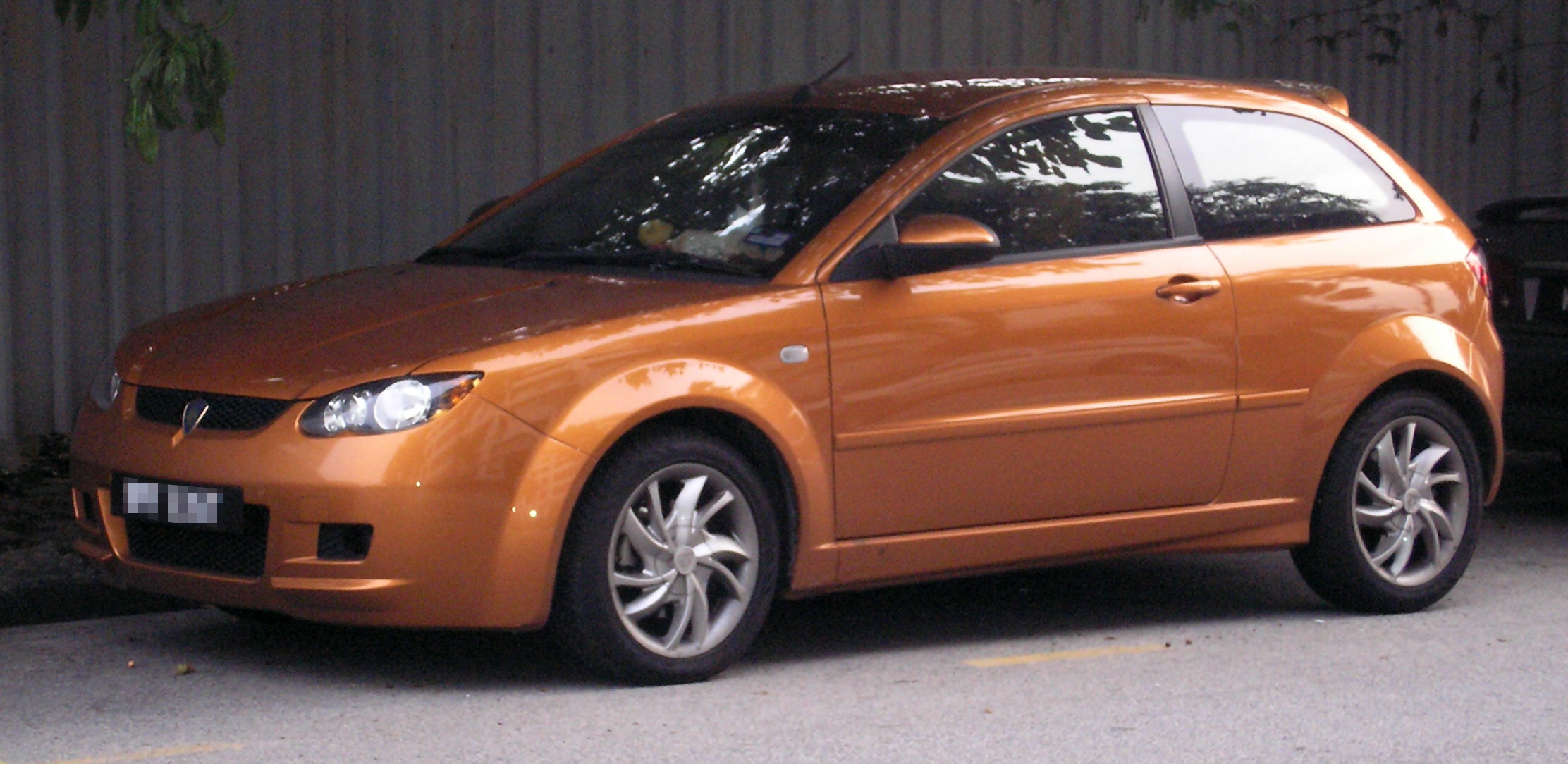

Overview
- Also called: Proton Neo (Thailand, Indonesia)
- Production: June 2006 – October 2015
- Designer: Azlan Othman

Powertrain
- Engine: 1.3 L CamPro S4PE I4; 1.6 L CamPro S4PH I4; 1.6 L CamPro CPS I4
- Transmission: 4-speed automatic 5-speed manual

Dimensions
- Wheelbase: 2,440 mm (96.1 in)
- Length: 3,905 mm (153.7 in)
- Width: 1,710 mm (67.3 in)
- Height: 1,420 mm (55.9 in)
- Curb weight: 1,146 kg (2,526 lb) (1.3 L Manual); 1,184 kg (2,610 lb) (1.6 L Auto)

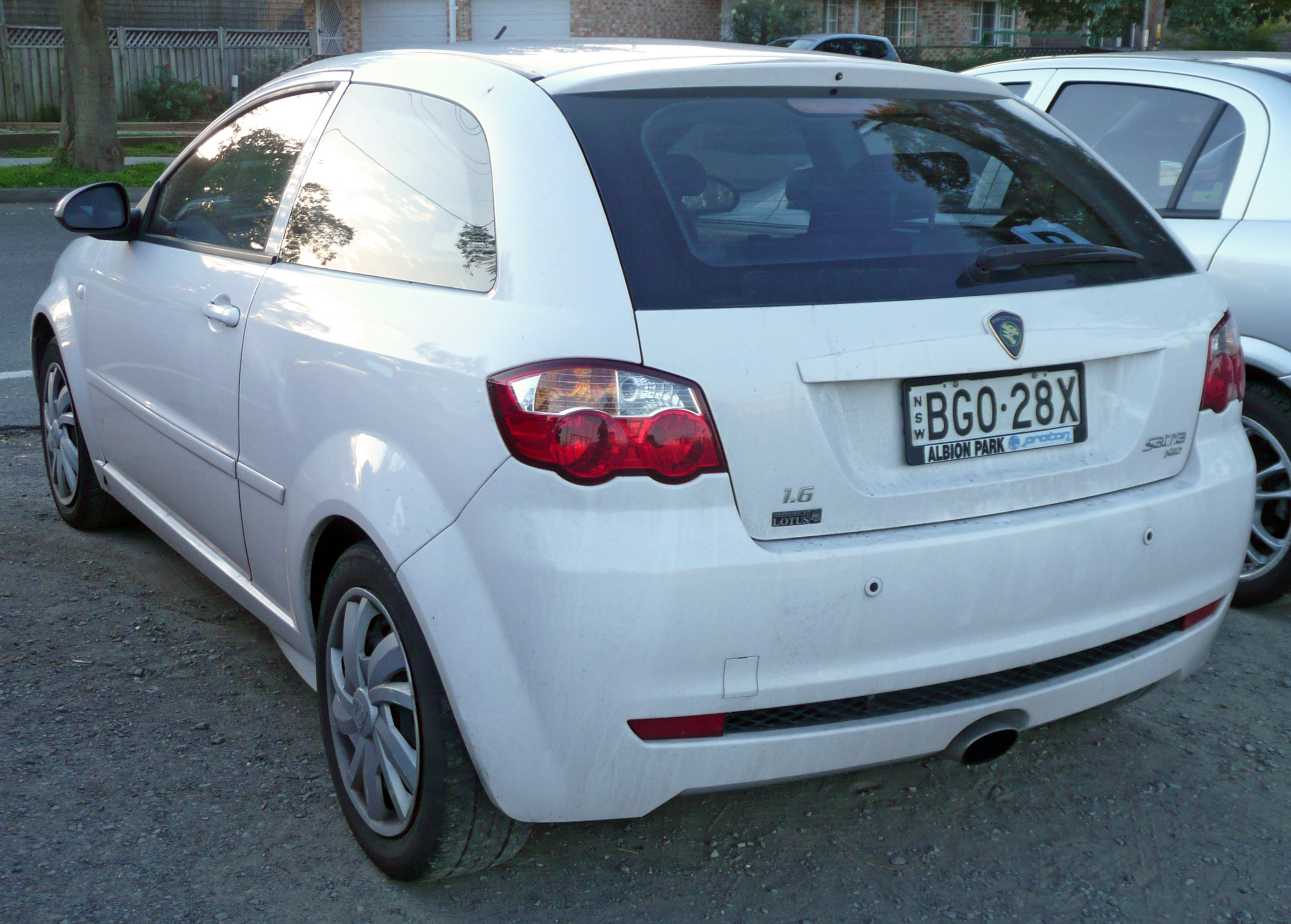
2007–2009 Proton Satria Neo GX in Australia.

The Proton Satria Neo was introduced in June 2006 as a replacement for the first generation Satria. Based on a new platform developed in-house by Proton (with some parts borrowed from the bigger Gen-2 and Waja), the car was only available in a three-door hatchback guise. The car was developed at a cost of RM500 million and four years, and was expected by Proton to generate a monthly sales volume of 2,000 - 2,500 units. The car was also intended to target those who are "youthful and sporty". The Satria Neo was launched by the fifth Malaysian Prime Minister Abdullah Ahmad Badawi. The Satria Neo was also the first and only Malaysian car to be sold in Japan.

The entry-level Satria Neo, the 1.3 B-line, is powered by a 1.3-liter, inline-four twin-cam CamPro engine, producing 94 bhp (70 kW) at 6,000 rpm and 120 Nm of torque at 4,000 rpm. The 1.6 M-line and top-of-the-range H-line models have 1.6 liter versions of the same engine, with an output of 110 hp (82 kW) at 6,000 rpm and 148 Nm of torque at 4,000 rpm. Both the M-line and H-line models have active system antennae which actively search for signals in areas with poor reception. All cars have the option of either 5-speed manual or 4-speed automatic gearboxes supplied by Mitsubishi that are carried over from the previous Satria, with the H-line benefiting from safety features such as twin airbags, ABS with EBD and seatbelt pre-tensioners. All versions of the car come with an integrated Blaupunkt CD player.

=== Proton Satria Neo CPS ===
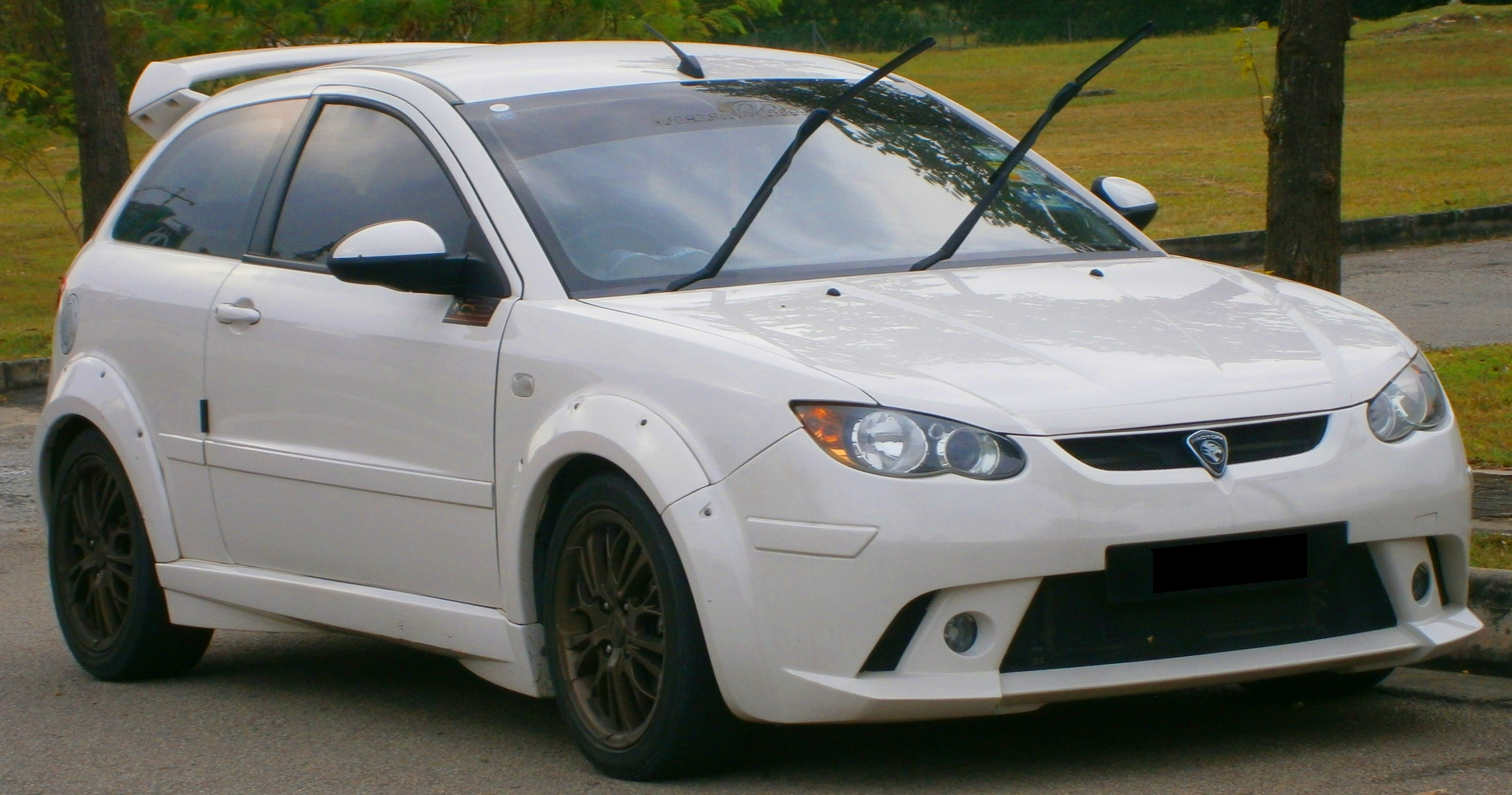

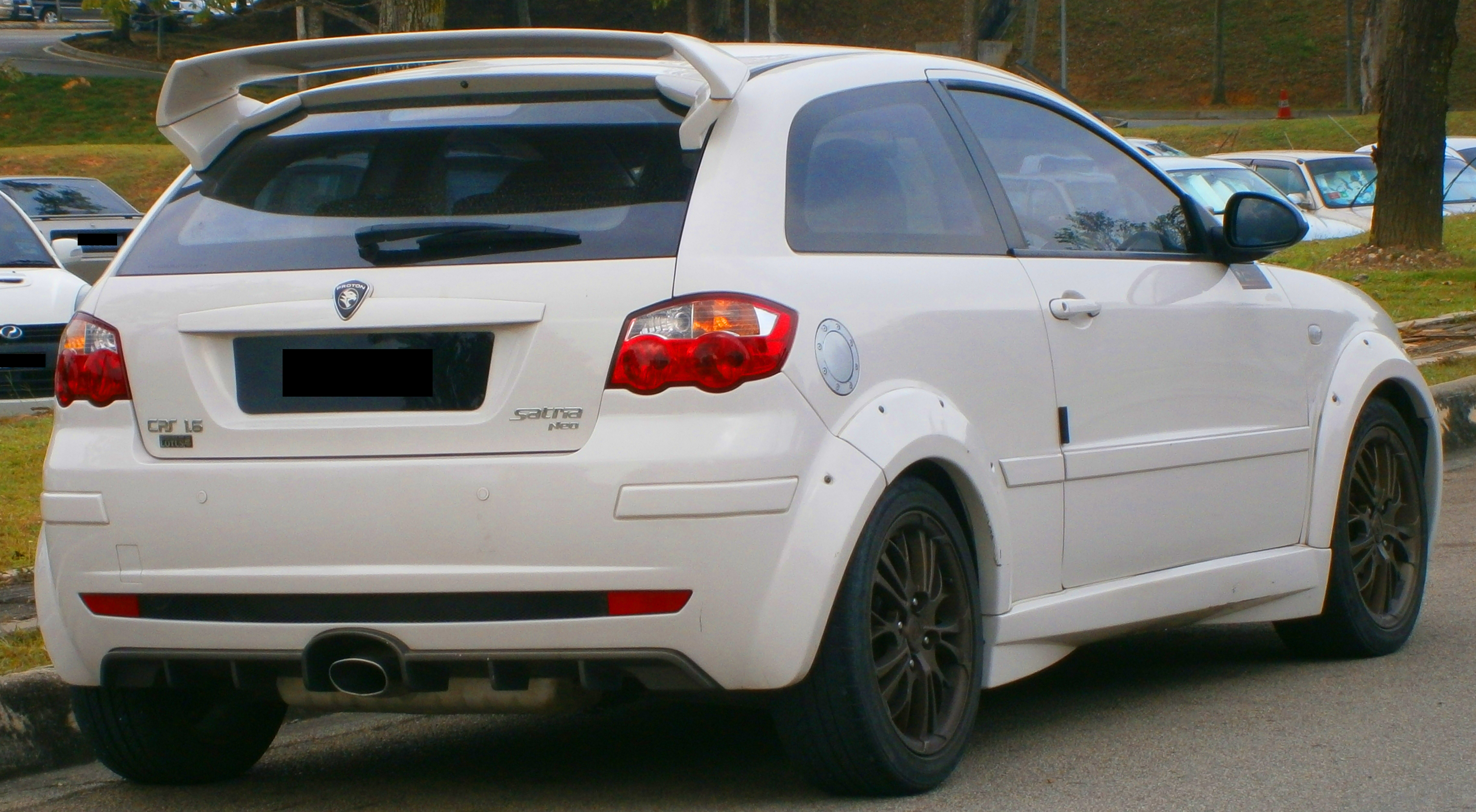
2011 Proton Satria Neo CPS (Cam Profile Switching) H-Line

In February 2009, Proton launched a CPS (Cam Profile Switching) version of the Satria Neo, replacing the high-end H-Line version of the Satria Neo. It comes with an aggressively styled body kit and spoiler that pays homage to the Satria GTi, most notably with the addition of bolt-on wheel arches. It is powered by a 1.6-litre CamPro CPS engine with 125 bhp (93 kW; 127 PS) and 150 N⋅m (110 lb⋅ft) of torque which reportedly does not suffer from the torque dip of older CamPro engines; however, the timing of the cam profile switching mechanism is slightly modified for aggressive driving – the CPS mechanism in the Satria Neo CPS changes from low cam to high cam at 4,400 rpm rather than at 3,800 rpm as in the other CPS-equipped models such as the Proton Waja and Proton Gen-2, as well as the Proton Exora. The Satria Neo CPS H-Line has a narrower front track of 1,467mm and a wider rear track of 1,483mm (compared to the base Proton Satria Neo, which had a front and rear track of 1,470mm). A member of Proton's Race Rally Research (R3) team claims that the change was made to induce slight understeer, as Proton had noticed that the base Satria Neo suffered from mild oversteering.

Specifications (CPS)

Powertrain Engine & Performance
Engine	CamPro CPS 4 cylinder, DOHC 16V
Maximum Speed (km/h)	210 km/h
Acceleration 0–100 km/h (sec)	10.5
Maximum Output hp(kW)/rpm	125 hp (93 kW) at 6,500 rpm
Maximum Torque (Nm/rpm)	150 Nm at 4,500 rpm
Full tank capacity (Litre)	50
Tyres & Rims	195 / 50 R16, 16" x 6.5JJ Alloy wheels
Chassis
Power Steering	Hydraulic Power Steering
Suspension (Front/Rear)	MacPherson Strut with Stabiliser Bar/ Multi-link with Stabiliser Bar
Brake (Front/Rear)	Ventilated disc/ Solid Disc

=== Proton Satria Neo R3 ===
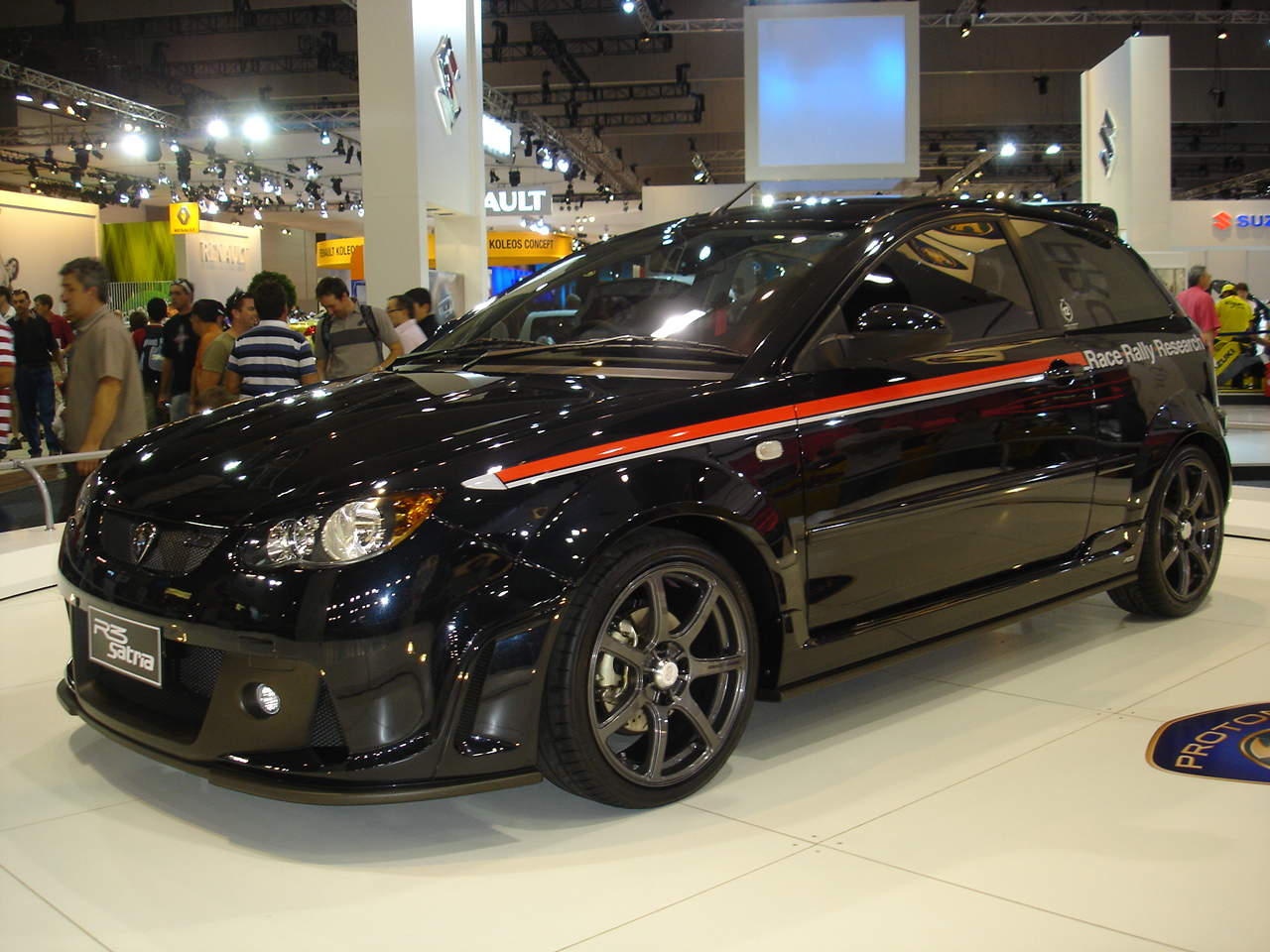
The 2008 model of Proton Satria R3 on display at the 2008 Melbourne Motor Show.

As a successor to the original Satria R3, Proton introduced a high performance version of the Satria Neo in 2008. It features a naturally aspired 1.6-litre engine producing 100 kW (136 PS; 134 hp) or 110 bhp (82 kW; 112 PS), which Proton says will deliver a "controlled yet exciting driving experience". Other upgrades include a sportier bodykit, 17-inch wheels, a lowered suspension setup derived from Lotus, an improved braking system, Recaro lightweight seats and a MOMO steering wheel. All of the 50 examples produced come in Incognito Black with a unique "Race, Rally Research" decal on the side.

==== Proton Satria Neo R3 Lotus Racing ====
The 25 unit-only Satria Neo R3 Lotus Racing was introduced on the 30 March 2010. Sold at RM115,000 this special version of the Neo features some improvements over its sibling, the Satria Neo CPS. The look is similar to that of the Satria Neo R3, but includes some exclusive equipment. The engine is R3-tuned with R3 Engine Management System, R3 Camshafts with adjustable alloy cams and R3 tuned exhaust system. R3 Division also used an R3 Carbon Fibre Air Intake with K&N Air Filter System.

The engine now produces 145 bhp (108 kW; 147 PS), approximately 13.8 percent more power than a normal CamPro CPS. with an improved torque of 168 N⋅m (124 lb⋅ft). Top speed reaches 205 km/h (127 mph) and the century run is achieved in 12.2 seconds.

The gear ratios were also revised to match the engine upgrade.

The chassis and handling were improved with the use of Ohlins Adjustable coilovers. The wheels are 16-inch Advantis with Bridgestone Adrenalin tyres. The brakes are from AP Racing consisting of AP Racing calipers and pads.

Interior-wise, the dash remains the same but it is now painted in a greenish accent to match Lotus' green Trademark. Few enhancements were put in place such as the engine start button, dark green Nappa leather and an alloy pedal set and gear knob.

==== 2011 Proton Satria Neo R3 RS ====
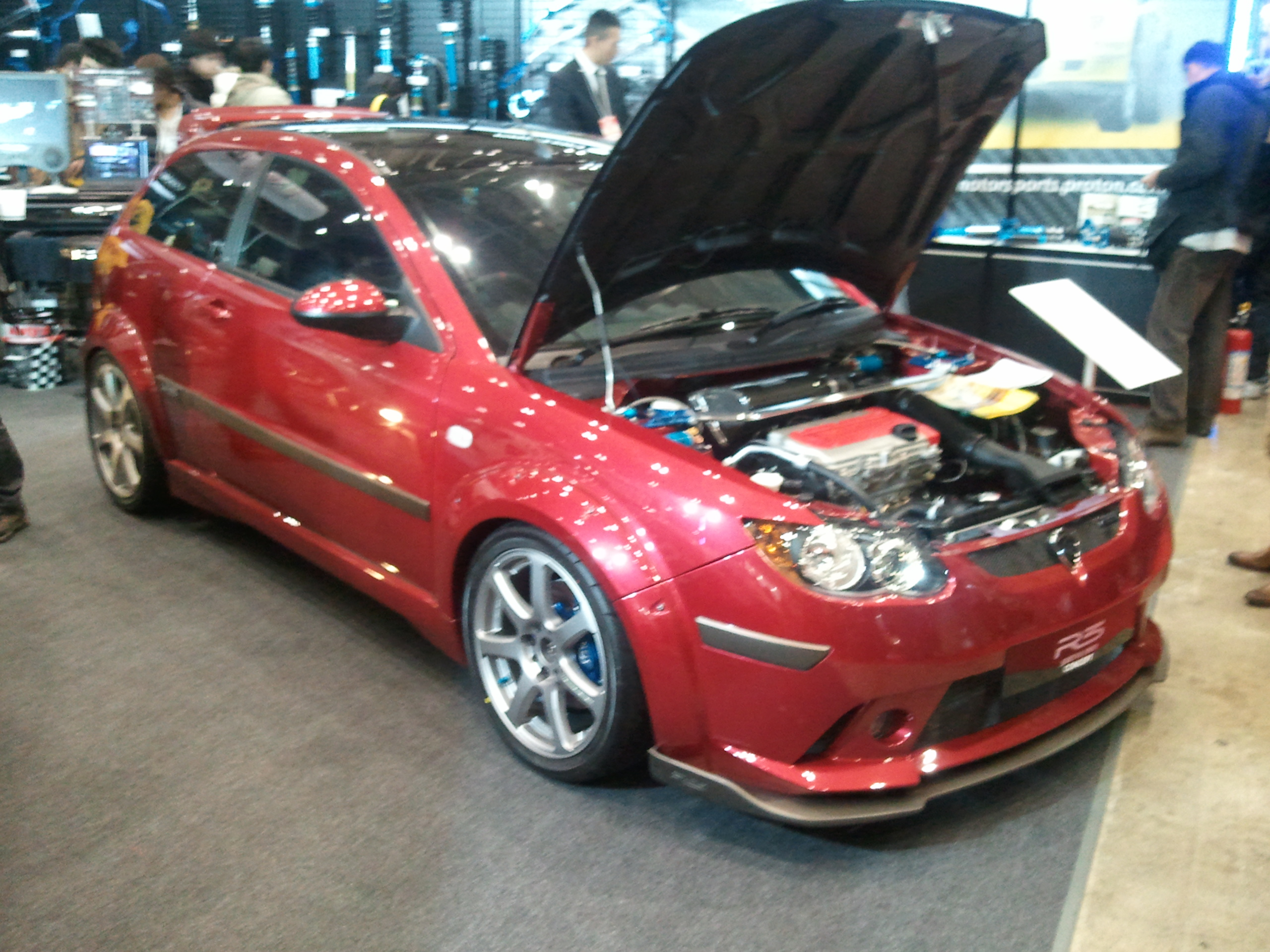
2011 Proton Satria Neo R3 RS

In continuation of the legacy of the Satria Neo R3 Lotus Racing, Proton introduced the 2011 R3 Satria Neo (also known as Satria Neo R3 RS) on 8 February 2011. Available only 150 units in bright red with a black roof, it cost RM79,797.00 and featured a metal plaque with its individual number, built-in 2-DIN navigation system, the first in Proton's history. It was fitted with the old Satria Neo CPS bodykit mated to new R3 Design 16-inch alloy rims, R3 front splitter and R3 rear spoilers and side mouldings in addition to leather upholstery, red-coloured dashboard trims and various other R3 extras on the interior. Its handling and performance attributes remained unchanged over its Lotus Racing sibling.

Prior to its launch, the concept model for the 2011 Proton Satria Neo R3 was debuted during the Tokyo Auto Salon 2011.

==== 2013 Proton Satria Neo R3 ====
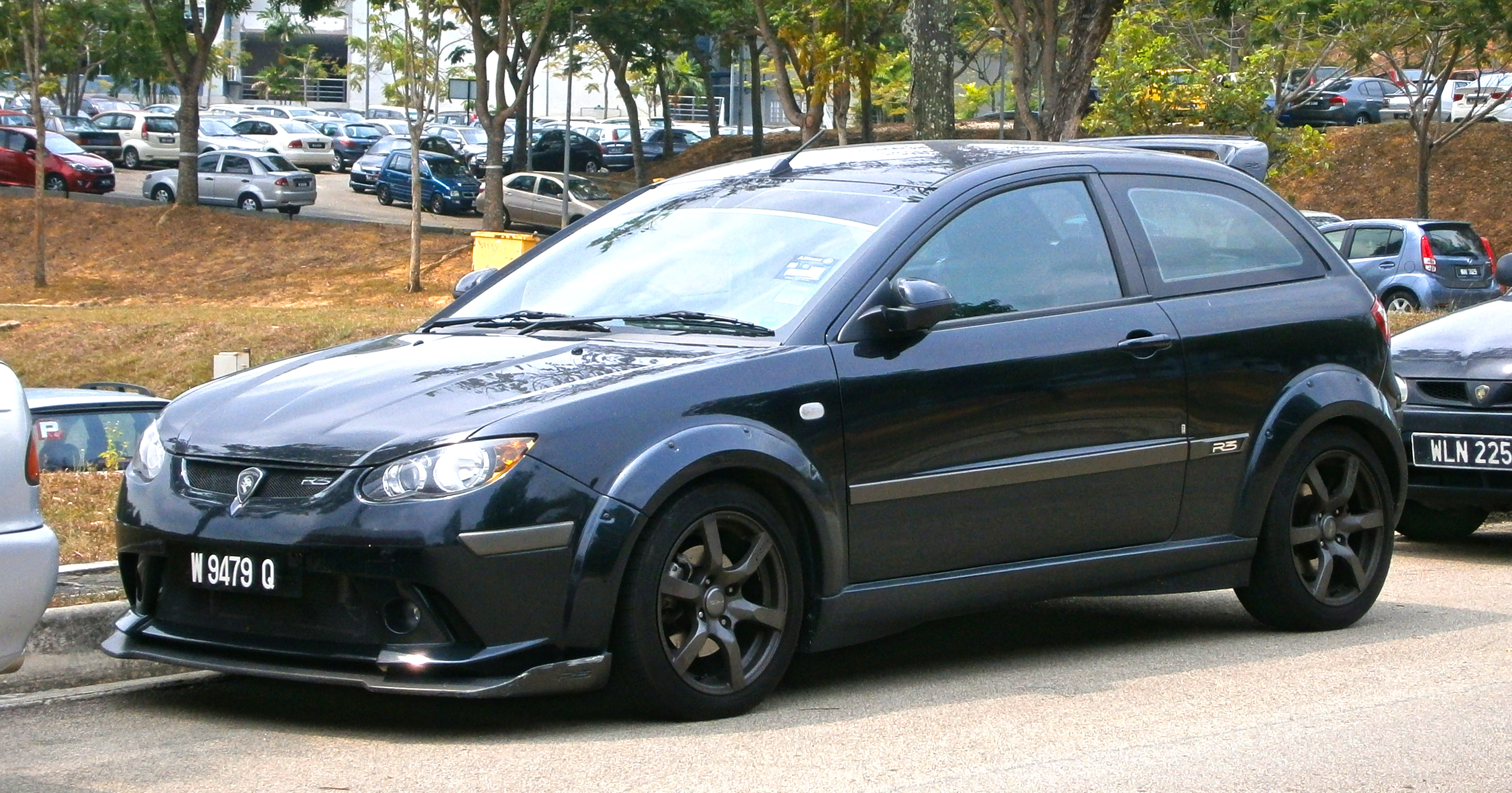
2013–2015 Proton Satria Neo R3

Proton launched the 2013 Satria Neo R3 on 29 November 2012.

It is technically identical performance-wise to the Satria Neo CPS, but features the 2011 Satria Neo R3 bodykit and a significantly reduced price tag, costing between RM60,800 and RM64,250.

The roof of the 2013 Satria Neo R3 is painted according to the body colour. This differentiates it from the 2011 Satria Neo R3 RS which had a black roof. Optional decals and performance equipment such as ECU upgrades and full exhaust systems were also made available by Proton.

The 2013 Satria Neo R3 is fitted with dual airbags, ABS with EBD and is offered in manual and auto transmissions with a choice of 3 colours: silver, black and red.

=== Proton Satria Neo Super 2000 Rally Car ===
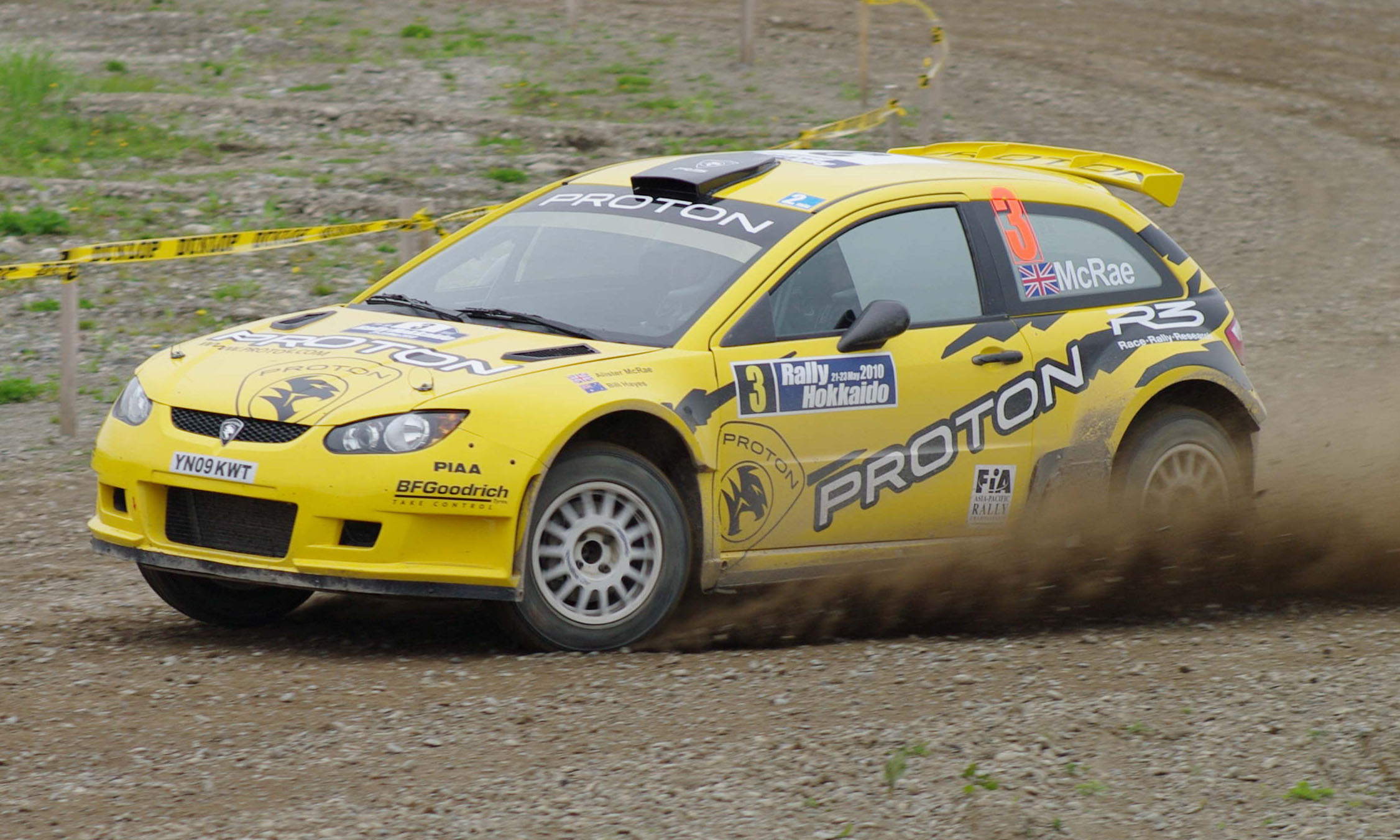
Proton Satria Neo Super 2000 Rally Car.

Proton Motorsports' British based partner Mellors Elliot Motorsports (MEM) has prepared a FIA Super 2000 compliant Proton Satria Neo based on the road car's chassis. It is powered by the same engine as found in the Proton Waja 1.8. The team's current drivers in 2011 on the Intercontinental Rally Challenge (IRC), starting with the Rally Monte Carlo is Chris Atkinson. He will contest on all six rounds of the 2011 Asia Pacific Rally Championship (APRC) and Per-Gunnar Andersson who drives the second car for the Proton team in the IRC events, while Alister McRae will continue to drive for Proton in the APRC. McRae took the car to its first drivers and constructors titles in the 2011 APRC.

A pair of Proton Satria Neo S2000s were used in an episode of Top Gear, in a race between the British presenters and their Australian counterparts at Cornbury Park, a former Rally GB venue.

=== Proton Satria Neo CUSCO Edition ===
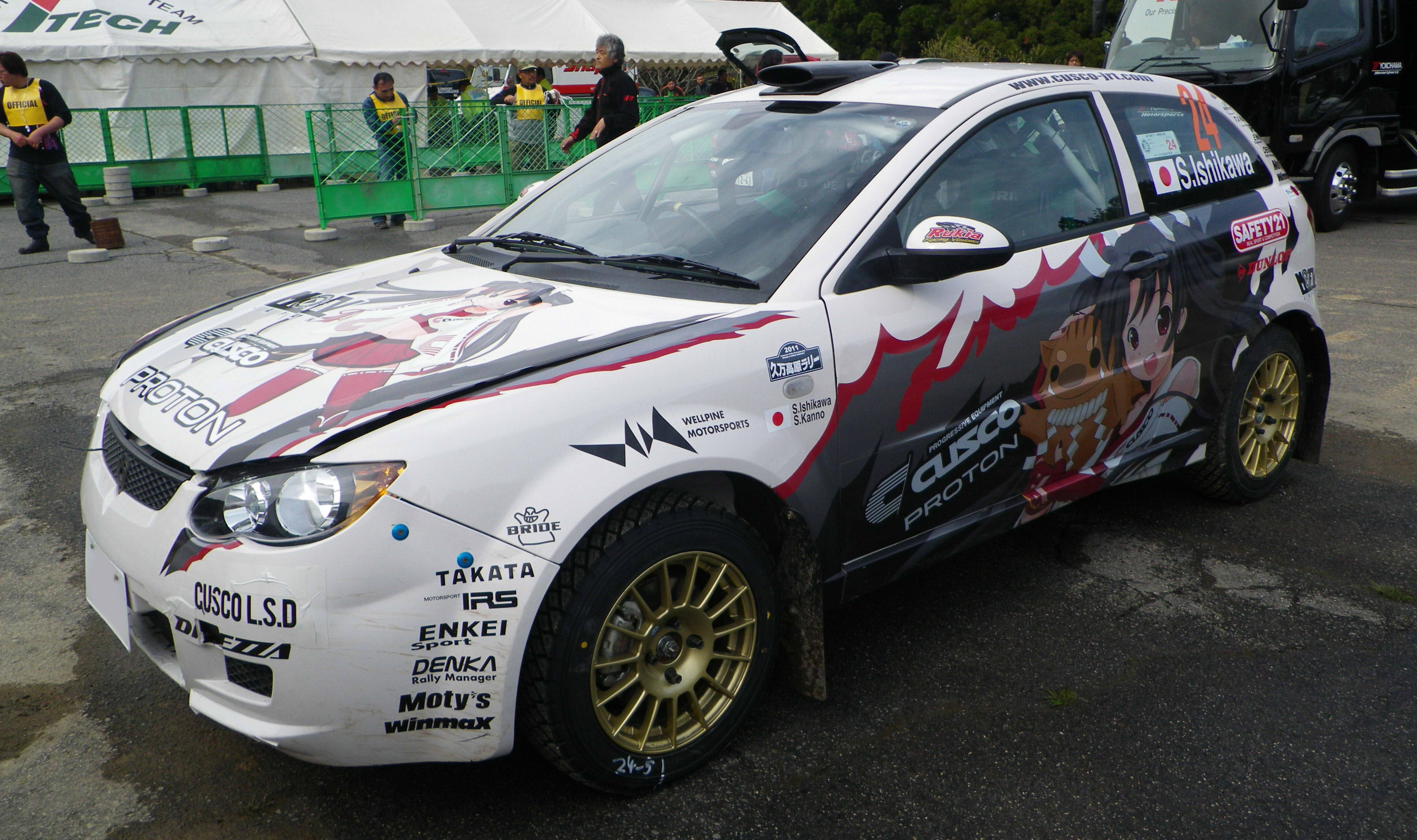
Proton Satria Neo CUSCO Edition.

Proton made its presence felt for the very first time in Japan when renowned Japanese automotive parts manufacturer Carrosser Co., Ltd. (CUSCO) officially unveiled at the Tokyo Auto Salon, a specially developed Satria Neo rally car that will be sold in Japan. In January 2011, Proton announced that Japanese auto parts company CUSCO would be buying standard road-going Satria Neo body shells to engineer and homologate according to FIA Group N regulation competition use.

The Group N Proton Satria Neo rally cars will be based on stock standard road-registered 1600cc showroom models acquired by CUSCO, homologated according to FIA regulations for competition use, and retrofitted with CUSCO-developed aftermarket performance and race components. With the Satria Neo, CUSCO is essentially Proton's customer – they buy the body shells, equip them with CUSCO-developed race components, and then sell the completed Group N rally-going Neos to customers who will compete in Junior Rally Championships in Japan and Asia Pacific.

Veteran Malaysian rally driver, Karamjit Singh piloted a CUSCO-tuned Proton Satria Neo 2WD in which he crossed the line to finish first in the overall 2011 APRC 2WD category in May 2011 Rally of Queensland as well as first in the N2 category.

Three Satria Neos were fielded in the 2011 Japan Rally Championship in JN-3, one unit for the CUSCO Team and two for the CUSCO Junior Rally Team respectively. The latter finished with a class win in Rally Hokkaido 2011. In the 2012 season, only the Junior Rally Team drove the Satria Neos, whereas the CUSCO Team had replaced their unit with a Toyota 86.

== Sales ==
Year	Malaysia (Note: Figures based on registration)	
Year	Proton Satria	Proton Satria Neo
2000	8,920	
2001	6,536	
2002	7,983	
2003	4,023	
2004	2,049	
2005	2,032	
2006	906	3,104
2007	980	4,836
2008	590	3,231
2009	471	3,488
2010	195	4,030
2011	161	3,313
2012	3	178
2013		1,418
2014		1,165
2015		215
