= 2016 Global RallyCross Championship =

Seasons
- ← 2015 2017 →

The 2016 Red Bull Global RallyCross Championship was the sixth season of the Global RallyCross Championship. Scott Speed was the reigning Supercars champion and Oliver Eriksson was the reigning GRC Lites champion. The schedule consisted of twelve rounds at eight different venues. The season started at Wild Horse Pass Motorsports Park on May 21 and it concluded at the Port of Los Angeles on October 9.

== Schedule ==
A twelve-round provisional calendar was revealed on January 26, 2016 with the sixth, seventh and eighth round to be announced, though it was certain the sixth and seventh round would take place on a military base. On March 3, 2016 GRC announced the eighth round would take place in Atlantic City and on June 1, 2016 GRC announced the sixth and seventh round would take place at the Marine Corps Air Station New River. It was the first time since the 2012 season that all events were held in the United States.

Round	Event	Location	Date
1	Red Bull Global RallyCross Phoenix	Wild Horse Pass Motorsports Park, Chandler, Arizona	21–22 May
2	Red Bull Global RallyCross Phoenix	Wild Horse Pass Motorsports Park, Chandler, Arizona	21–22 May
3	Red Bull Global RallyCross Dallas	Fair Park, Dallas, Texas	4 June
4	Red Bull Global RallyCross Daytona	Daytona International Speedway, Daytona Beach, Florida	18–19 June
5	Red Bull Global RallyCross Daytona	Daytona International Speedway, Daytona Beach, Florida	18–19 June
6	Red Bull Global RallyCross MCAS New River	MCAS New River, Jacksonville, North Carolina	2–3 July
7	Red Bull Global RallyCross MCAS New River	MCAS New River, Jacksonville, North Carolina	2–3 July
8	Red Bull Global RallyCross Washington	RFK Stadium, Washington, D.C.	30 July
9	Red Bull Global RallyCross Atlantic City	Bader Field, Atlantic City, New Jersey	28 August
10	Red Bull Global RallyCross Seattle	Evergreen Speedway, Monroe, Washington	17 September
11	Red Bull Global RallyCross Los Angeles	Port of Los Angeles, Los Angeles, California	8–9 October
12	Red Bull Global RallyCross Los Angeles	Port of Los Angeles, Los Angeles, California	8–9 October

== Entry list ==
=== Supercars ===
Manufacturer	Team	Car	No.	Drivers	Rounds
(United States) Ford	(United States) Chip Ganassi Racing	Ford Fiesta ST	00	(Canada) Steve Arpin	All
(United States) Ford	(United States) Chip Ganassi Racing	Ford Fiesta ST	38	(United States) Brian Deegan	All
(United States) Ford	(United States) SH Rallycross	Ford Fiesta ST	07	(United States) Jeff Ward	1–7
(United States) Ford	(United States) SH Rallycross	Ford Fiesta ST	07	(Brazil) Nelson Piquet Jr.	8–10
(United States) Ford	(United States) SH Rallycross	Ford Fiesta ST	07	(United States) Tanner Whitten (R)	11–12
(United States) Ford	(United States) AD Racing	Ford Fiesta ST	14	(United States) Austin Dyne	All
(United States) Ford	(United States) AD Racing	Ford Fiesta ST	77	(Colombia) Sebastián Saavedra (R)	1–2, 4–5
(United States) Ford	(United States) Bryan Herta Rallysport	Ford Fiesta ST	18	(Sweden) Patrik Sandell	All
(Japan) Honda	(Sweden) Honda Red Bull OMSE	Honda Civic Coupe	24	(United States) Mitchell DeJong (R)	11–12
(Japan) Honda	(Sweden) Honda Red Bull OMSE	Honda Civic Coupe	31	(Finland) Joni Wiman	All
(Japan) Honda	(Sweden) Honda Red Bull OMSE	Honda Civic Coupe	93	(Sweden) Sebastian Eriksson	All
(Japan) Honda	(Sweden) Honda Red Bull OMSE	Honda Civic Coupe	96	(Sweden) Kevin Eriksson	9
(South Korea) Hyundai	(New Zealand) Rhys Millen Racing	Hyundai Veloster	67	(New Zealand) Rhys Millen	1–5
(Japan) Subaru	(United States) Subaru Rally Team USA	Subaru Impreza WRX STi	11	(Norway) Sverre Isachsen	6–9
(Japan) Subaru	(United States) Subaru Rally Team USA	Subaru Impreza WRX STi	55	(Australia) Chris Atkinson (R)	9–12
(Japan) Subaru	(United States) Subaru Rally Team USA	Subaru Impreza WRX STi	75	(Isle of Man) David Higgins	10–12
(Japan) Subaru	(United States) Subaru Rally Team USA	Subaru Impreza WRX STi	81	(United States) Bucky Lasek	6–9
(Japan) Subaru	(United States) Subaru Rally Team USA	Subaru Impreza WRX STi	88	(Japan) Toshi Arai (R)	11–12
(Germany) Volkswagen	(United States) Volkswagen Andretti Rallycross	Volkswagen Beetle	34	(United States) Tanner Foust	All
(Germany) Volkswagen	(United States) Volkswagen Andretti Rallycross	Volkswagen Beetle	41	(United States) Scott Speed	All

=== GRC Lites ===
Every driver competes in an Olsbergs MSE-built GRC Lites car.

Team	No.	Drivers	Rounds
(United States) Dreyer & Reinbold Racing	2	(United States) Cabot Bigham (R)	All
(United States) Dreyer & Reinbold Racing	24	(United States) Alex Keyes	1–2, 6–9, 11–12
(United States) Dreyer & Reinbold Racing	24	(United States) Tanner Whitten	3–5, 10
(Colombia) AF Racing	3	(United States) Travis PeCoy (R)	All
(Colombia) AF Racing	44	(United States) Christian Brooks (R)	All
(Colombia) AF Racing	126	(Colombia) Alejandro Fernández	All
(United States) River Racing (Note: Car No. 07 entered as River Racing and cars No. 22, 42 and 88 entered as Rhys Millen Racing) (New Zealand) Rhys Millen Racing	07	(United States) Collete Davis	1–7
(United States) River Racing (New Zealand) Rhys Millen Racing	22	(Australia) Blake Williams	4–7, 11–12
(United States) River Racing (New Zealand) Rhys Millen Racing	42	(United States) Nur Ali	3
(United States) River Racing (New Zealand) Rhys Millen Racing	88	(United States) Preston Murray (R)	1–2
(Sweden) Olsbergs MSE X Forces	16	(Sweden) Oliver Eriksson	All
(Sweden) Olsbergs MSE X Forces	45	(Finland) Miki Weckström (R)	All
(Sweden) Olsbergs MSE X Forces	51	(Sweden) Sandra Hultgren	8–9
(Sweden) Olsbergs MSE X Forces	53	(United States) Cole Keatts (R)	All
(United States) PMG Rallysport	19	(United States) Trenton Estep (R)	1–2
(United States) PMG Rallysport	19	(United States) Parker Chase (R)	3–7
(United States) PMG Rallysport	69	(United States) Harry Gottsacker (R)	1–7
(United States) DirtFish Motorsports	21	(United States) Conner Martell	All
(United States) DirtFish Motorsports	25	(United States) James Rimmer (R)	10–12
(United States) CORE Autosport	54	(United States) Jon Bennett (R)	4–5, 8–10
(United States) CORE Autosport	54	(United States) Colin Braun (R)	11–12
(United States) CORE Autosport	56	(United States) Colin Braun (R)	4–5, 8–9
(United States) CORE Autosport	56	(United States) Scott Anderson (R)	10–12

== Results and standings ==
=== Race results ===
No.	Event	3rd Place	2nd Place	GRC Lites Winner	Winner	Winning team	Manufacturer
1	Red Bull Global RallyCross Phoenix	(United States) Brian Deegan	(Sweden) Patrik Sandell	(Finland) Miki Weckström	(United States) Tanner Foust	(United States) Volkswagen Andretti Rallycross	(Germany) Volkswagen
2	Red Bull Global RallyCross Phoenix	(Sweden) Sebastian Eriksson	(United States) Scott Speed	(United States) Conner Martell	(United States) Tanner Foust	(United States) Volkswagen Andretti Rallycross	(Germany) Volkswagen
3	Red Bull Global RallyCross Dallas	(United States) Tanner Foust	(Canada) Steve Arpin	(Sweden) Oliver Eriksson	(Sweden) Patrik Sandell	(United States) Bryan Herta Rallysport	(United States) Ford
4	Red Bull Global RallyCross Daytona	(Sweden) Sebastian Eriksson	(United States) Brian Deegan	(Sweden) Oliver Eriksson	(Canada) Steve Arpin	(United States) Chip Ganassi Racing	(United States) Ford
5	Red Bull Global RallyCross Daytona	(Sweden) Sebastian Eriksson	(United States) Scott Speed	(United States) Tanner Whitten	(United States) Tanner Foust	(United States) Volkswagen Andretti Rallycross	(Germany) Volkswagen
6	Red Bull Global RallyCross MCAS New River	(Canada) Steve Arpin	(United States) Brian Deegan	(Finland) Miki Weckström	(United States) Scott Speed	(United States) Volkswagen Andretti Rallycross	(Germany) Volkswagen
7	Red Bull Global RallyCross MCAS New River	The LCQ and Final of both the Supercars and GRC Lites were suspended due to track conditions after heavy rain.					
8	Red Bull Global RallyCross Washington	(United States) Tanner Foust	(Sweden) Patrik Sandell	(United States) Cabot Bigham	(United States) Scott Speed	(United States) Volkswagen Andretti Rallycross	(Germany) Volkswagen
9	Red Bull Global RallyCross Atlantic City	(United States) Brian Deegan	(Sweden) Patrik Sandell	(United States) Alex Keyes	(United States) Scott Speed	(United States) Volkswagen Andretti Rallycross	(Germany) Volkswagen
10	Red Bull Global RallyCross Seattle	(Finland) Joni Wiman	(Sweden) Sebastian Eriksson	(United States) Conner Martell	(United States) Tanner Foust	(United States) Volkswagen Andretti Rallycross	(Germany) Volkswagen
11	Red Bull Global RallyCross Los Angeles	(Canada) Steve Arpin	(United States) Tanner Foust	(United States) Alex Keyes	(United States) Scott Speed	(United States) Volkswagen Andretti Rallycross	(Germany) Volkswagen
12	Red Bull Global RallyCross Los Angeles	(Sweden) Patrik Sandell	(United States) Scott Speed	(United States) Cabot Bigham	(United States) Brian Deegan	(United States) Chip Ganassi Racing	(United States) Ford

=== Drivers' championships ===
Scoring system

Points were awarded based on finishing positions as shown in the chart below:

Position	**1st**	**2nd**	**3rd**	**4th**	**5th**	**6th**	**7th**	**8th**	**9th**	**10th**	**Others**
Points	50	45	40	35	30	25	20	15	10	5	0

In addition, points were awarded in all rounds of heats and semifinals. First place earned five points, second place earned four points, and so on through fifth place and below, which earned one point.

==== Supercars ====
Pos.	Driver	Team	PHO1	PHO2	DAL	DAY1	DAY2	MCAS1	MCAS2	DC	AC	SEA	LA1	LA2	Pts.
1	(United States) Scott Speed	(United States) Volkswagen Andretti Rallycross	5^{2 B}	2^{1 B}	4^{2 B}	7	**2**^{LCQ}	**1**^{LCQ}	C^{1}	**1**^{2 A}	**1**^{2 A}	4	**1**^{2 A}	2^{A}	571
2	(United States) Tanner Foust	(United States) Volkswagen Andretti Rallycross	**1**^{2 A}	**1**^{1 A}	**3**^{2 A}	9^{2 B}	1^{1 A}	8^{2 B}	**C**^{B}	3^{2 B}	4^{2 B}	**1**^{2 A}	2^{B}	4^{1 LCQ}	567
3	(United States) Brian Deegan	(United States) Chip Ganassi Racing	3^{LCQ}	6^{LCQ}	7^{LCQ}	2	5^{1 B}	2	C	4	3	7	4	1	473
4	(Canada) Steve Arpin	(United States) Chip Ganassi Racing	4	5	2	1^{1 A}	6	3^{A}	C^{1}	6^{LCQ}	5	5^{1}	3	10^{1}	461
5	(Sweden) Patrik Sandell	(United States) Bryan Herta Rallysport	2	4	1	**8**^{1}	8	4^{1}	C	2	2	11	5	3	436
6	(Finland) Joni Wiman	(Sweden) Honda Red Bull OMSE	6	10	5	4	4	7	C	5	12	3^{LCQ}	11^{2}	5^{B}	342
7	(Sweden) Sebastian Eriksson	(Sweden) Honda Red Bull OMSE	9	3	10	3	3	6^{1}	C^{A}	10	6^{LCQ}	2^{1 B}	9	12	341
8	(United States) Austin Dyne	(United States) AD Racing	10	7	6	10	10	5	C	8	7	10	12	8	198
9	(United States) Jeff Ward	(United States) SH Rallycross	7	8	9	5	7	9	C						134
10	(New Zealand) Rhys Millen	(United States) Rhys Millen Racing	8	9	8	6	9								96
11	(Australia) Chris Atkinson **(R)**	(United States) Subaru Rally Team USA									11	6	7	**7**	88
12	(Brazil) Nelson Piquet Jr.	(United States) SH Rallycross								7	8	8			63
13	(Isle of Man) David Higgins	(United States) Subaru Rally Team USA										9	6^{LCQ}	9	57
14	(United States) Tanner Whitten **(R)**	(United States) SH Rallycross											10	6	37
15	(United States) Bucky Lasek	(United States) Subaru Rally Team USA						10	C	9	10				34
16	(United States) Mitchell DeJong **(R)**	(Sweden) Honda Red Bull OMSE											8	11	24
17	(Norway) Sverre Isachsen	(United States) Subaru Rally Team USA						11	C	11	9				19
18	(Sweden) Kevin Eriksson	(Sweden) Honda Red Bull OMSE									13				4
19	(Japan) Toshi Arai **(R)**	(United States) Subaru Rally Team USA											13	13	4
20	(Colombia) Sebastián Saavedra **(R)**	(United States) AD Racing	11	DNS		WD	WD								3

Colour	Result
Gold	Winner
Silver	Second place
Bronze	Third place
Green	Points classification
Blue	Non-points classification
Blue	Non-classified finish (NC)
Purple	Retired, not classified (Ret)
Red	Did not qualify (DNQ)
Red	Did not pre-qualify (DNPQ)
Black	Disqualified (DSQ)
White	Did not start (DNS)
White	Withdrew (WD)
White	Race cancelled (C)
Blank	Did not practice (DNP)
Blank	Did not arrive (DNA)
Blank	Excluded (EX)

**Bold** – Fastest time in qualifying
^{1 2} – Number of heat wins
^{A B} – Winner of Semifinal A or B
^{LCQ} – Winner of the Last Chance Qualifier

==== GRC Lites ====
Pos.	Driver	Team	PHO1	PHO2	DAL	DAY1	DAY2	MCAS1	MCAS2	DC	AC	SEA	LA1	LA2	Pts.
1	(United States) Cabot Bigham **(R)**	(United States) Dreyer & Reinbold Racing	4	2	2	7	6	4^{2}	C^{2}	1^{2}	5	10	3	1^{1}	452
2	(Sweden) Oliver Eriksson	(Sweden) Olsbergs MSE X Forces	10	6	1^{2}	1^{2}	2^{1}	10^{2}	**C**^{2}	**2**	4	2^{1}	8^{2}	4^{1}	447
3	(Finland) Miki Weckström **(R)**	(Sweden) Olsbergs MSE X Forces	1^{2}	3^{2}	10	10	3^{1 LCQ}	1	C	3^{1}	7	3	2	9	419
4	(United States) Conner Martell	(United States) DirtFish Motorsports	2^{LCQ}	1^{1}	8^{LCQ}	4	4	**8**	C	10	6^{1}	**1**^{2}	11	6^{LCQ}	359
5	(United States) Christian Brooks **(R)**	(Colombia) AF Racing	6	4	4	6	7	11	C	7	9^{1}	9	4	8	288
6	(United States) Alex Keyes	(United States) Dreyer & Reinbold Racing	**3**^{2}	**8**^{1 LCQ}				9	C	5	**1**^{2}		**1**^{2}	**7**^{2}	268
7	(Colombia) Alejandro Fernández	(Colombia) AF Racing	12	DSQ	7	5^{LCQ}	9	6^{LCQ}	C	6	10	4	6	5	256
8	(United States) Travis PeCoy **(R)**	(Colombia) AF Racing	7	DNS	9	11	5	13	C	4^{1 LCQ}	2	6^{LCQ}	5	DNS	249
9	(United States) Tanner Whitten	(United States) Dreyer & Reinbold Racing			**3**^{2}	**2**^{2}	**1**^{2}					8^{1}			188
10	(United States) Colin Braun **(R)**	(United States) CORE Autosport				3	10			12	3^{LCQ}		DSQ^{LCQ}	3	154
11	(United States) Collete Davis	(United States) River Racing	9	5	13	13	8	7	C						94
12	(United States) Parker Chase **(R)**	(United States) PMG Rallysport			6	8	11	3	C						85
13	(United States) Harry Gottsacker **(R)**	(United States) PMG Rallysport	11	DNS	5	15	14	5	C						85
14	(Australia) Blake Williams	(United States) Rhys Millen Racing				14	13	2	C				9	DSQ	75
15	(United States) Trenton Estep **(R)**	(United States) PMG Rallysport	5	7											57
16	(United States) Scott Anderson **(R)**	(United States) CORE Autosport										11	12	2	55
17	(United States) Cole Keatts **(R)**	(Sweden) Olsbergs MSE X Forces	13	11	11	12	15	12	C	11	11	5	13	12	51
18	(United States) Jon Bennett **(R)**	(United States) CORE Autosport				9	12			9	12	7			51
19	(Sweden) Sandra Hultgren	(Sweden) Olsbergs MSE X Forces								8	8				36
20	(United States) Preston Murray **(R)**	(United States) Rhys Millen Racing	8	DNS											33
21	(United States) James Rimmer **(R)**	(United States) DirtFish Motorsports										12	7	11	25
22	(United States) Nur Ali	(United States) Rhys Millen Racing			12										3

=== Manufacturers' championship ===
Pos.	Manufacturer	Pts.
1	(Germany) Volkswagen	51
2	(United States) Ford	44
3	(Japan) Honda	36
4	(Japan) Subaru	13
