= 2015 Global RallyCross Championship =

Seasons
- ← 2014 2016 →

The 2015 Red Bull Global RallyCross Championship was the fifth season of the Global RallyCross Championship. Joni Wiman was the reigning champion in the Supercars class and drove for the same team, Olsbergs MSE. 2014 GRC Lites runner-up Sebastian Eriksson stepped up to the GRC.

== Schedule ==
- A seven-round provisional calendar was revealed on January 13, 2015.

| Round | Event | Location | Date |
|---|---|---|---|
| 1 | Red Bull Global Rallycross Florida | (United States) Bahia Mar Resort & Marina, Ft. Lauderdale, Florida | May 31 |
| NC | X Games Austin 2015 Rally Car Racing | (United States) Circuit of the Americas, Austin, Texas | June 6 |
| 2 | Red Bull Global Rallycross Daytona | (United States) Daytona International Speedway, Daytona Beach, Florida | June 20–21 |
| 3 | Red Bull Global Rallycross Daytona | (United States) Daytona International Speedway, Daytona Beach, Florida | June 20–21 |
| 4 | Red Bull Global Rallycross The Base | (United States) MCAS New River, Jacksonville, North Carolina | July 5 |
| 5 | Red Bull Global Rallycross Detroit | (United States) The Raceway at Belle Isle, Detroit, Michigan | July 25–26 |
| 6 | Red Bull Global Rallycross Detroit | (United States) The Raceway at Belle Isle, Detroit, Michigan | July 25–26 |
| 7 | Red Bull Global Rallycross Washington | (United States) RFK Stadium, Washington, D.C. | August 15 |
| 8 | Red Bull Global Rallycross Los Angeles | (United States) Port of Los Angeles, Los Angeles, California | September 12–13 |
| 9 | Red Bull Global Rallycross Los Angeles | (United States) Port of Los Angeles, Los Angeles, California | September 12–13 |
| 10 | Red Bull Global Rallycross Barbados | Bushy Park Circuit, St. Philip Barbados | October 3–4 |
| 11 | Red Bull Global Rallycross Barbados | Bushy Park Circuit, St. Philip Barbados | October 3–4 |
| 12 | Red Bull Global Rallycross Las Vegas | (United States) The Linq Hotel and Casino, Las Vegas, Nevada | November 4 |

== Entries ==
=== Supercars ===
| Constructor | Team | Car | No. | Drivers | Round(s) |
|---|---|---|---|---|---|
| Chevrolet | (United States) PMR Motorsports | Chevrolet Sonic | 59 | (United States) Pat Moro | NC, 7, 12 |
| Citroën | (United Kingdom) LD Motorsports | Citroën DS3 | 33 | (United Kingdom) Liam Doran | NC |
| Ford | (United States) Chip Ganassi Racing | Ford Fiesta ST | 00 | (Canada) Steve Arpin | All |
| Ford | (United States) Chip Ganassi Racing | Ford Fiesta ST | 38 | (United States) Brian Deegan | NC, 4–6, 8–12 |
| Ford | (United States) Chip Ganassi Racing | Ford Fiesta ST | 360 | (United States) Jeff Ward | 2–3, 7 |
| Ford | (United States) SH Racing Rallycross | Ford Fiesta ST | 07 | (Brazil) Nelson Piquet Jr. | 1, 2–12 |
| Ford | (United States) SH Racing Rallycross | Ford Fiesta ST | 07 | (Norway) Andreas Bakkerud | NC |
| Ford | (United States) Bryan Herta Rallysport | Ford Fiesta ST | 14 | (United States) Austin Dyne | All |
| Ford | (United States) Bryan Herta Rallysport | Ford Fiesta ST | 18 | (Sweden) Patrik Sandell | All |
| Ford | (Sweden) Olsbergs MSE | Ford Fiesta ST | 31 | (Finland) Joni Wiman | All |
| Ford | (Sweden) Olsbergs MSE | Ford Fiesta ST | 93 | (Sweden) Sebastian Eriksson | All |
| Ford | (United States) Royal Purple Racing | Ford Fiesta ST | 77 | (United States) Logan Gomez | 7 |
| Ford | (United States) Hoonigan Racing Division | Ford Fiesta ST | 43 | (United States) Ken Block | All |
| Hyundai | (New Zealand) Rhys Millen Racing | Hyundai Veloster | 67 | (United States) Rhys Millen | 10–11 |
| Hyundai | (New Zealand) Rhys Millen Racing | Hyundai Veloster | 89 | (United States) Brian Wong | 8–9 |
| Hyundai | (New Zealand) Rhys Millen Racing | Hyundai Veloster | 99 | (Puerto Rico) Victor Gonzalez Jr. | 1 |
| Subaru | (United States) Subaru Rally Team USA | Subaru WRX STi | 11 | (Norway) Sverre Isachsen | 1–6, 8–12 |
| Subaru | (United States) Subaru Rally Team USA | Subaru WRX STi | 75 | (United Kingdom) David Higgins | 8–9, 12 |
| Subaru | (United States) Subaru Rally Team USA | Subaru WRX STi | 81 | (United States) Bucky Lasek | 1–6, 8–9, 12 |
| Subaru | (United States) Subaru Rally Team USA | Subaru WRX STi | 199 | (United States) Travis Pastrana | NC, 8–9 |
| Volkswagen | (United States) Volkswagen Andretti Rallycross | Volkswagen Beetle | 34 | (United States) Tanner Foust | All |
| Volkswagen | (United States) Volkswagen Andretti Rallycross | Volkswagen Beetle | 41 | (United States) Scott Speed | All |

=== GRC Lites ===
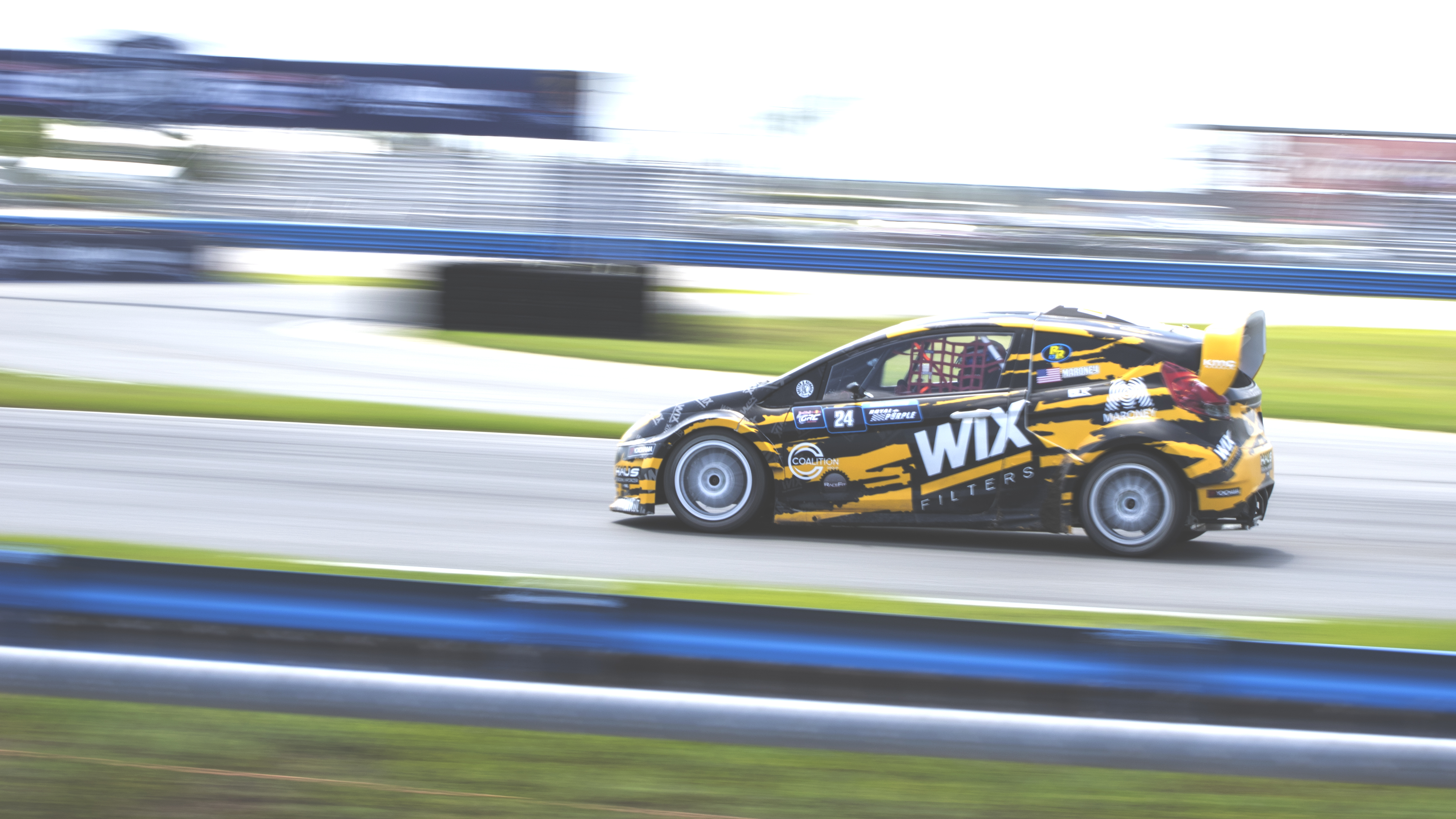
Miles Maroney during the second round at Daytona

All competitors drove an Olsbergs MSE-built GRC Lites car.

| Team | No. | Drivers | Round(s) |
|---|---|---|---|
| (United States) Buhl Sport Detroit | 4 | (United States) Augie Lerch | 12 |
| (United States) DTV Solutions | 6 | (United States) Geoff Sykes | 1–3 |
| (United States) River Racing with Bryan Herta Rallysport | 07 | (United States) Collete Davis | All |
| (United States) DirtFish Motorsports | 15 | (United States) Tanner Whitten | All |
| (Sweden) Olsbergs MSE | 16 | (Sweden) Oliver Eriksson | All |
| (Sweden) Olsbergs MSE | 28 | (United States) Gustavo Menezes | 12 |
| (Sweden) Olsbergs MSE | 51 | (Sweden) Sandra Hultgren | 12 |
| (Sweden) Olsbergs MSE | 77 | (United States) Austin Cindric | All |
| (Sweden) Olsbergs MSE | 89 | (Sweden) Andreas Wernersson | 12 |
| (Sweden) Olsbergs MSE | 99 | (Norway) Joachim Hvaal | 7 |
| (New Zealand) Rhys Millen Racing | 21 | (United States) Connor Martell | 4, 8–9 |
| (New Zealand) Rhys Millen Racing | 22 | (Australia) Blake Williams | 10–11 |
| (New Zealand) Rhys Millen Racing | 57 | (United States) Jackie Heinricher | 1–4 |
| (New Zealand) Rhys Millen Racing | 69 | (Paraguay) Blas Zapag | 7 |
| (New Zealand) Rhys Millen Racing | 88 | (United States) Harry Cheung | 2–3, 5–6, 8–11 |
| (New Zealand) Rhys Millen Racing | 88 | (France) Stephan Verdier | 12 |
| (New Zealand) Rhys Millen Racing | 89 | (United States) Brian Wong | 5–6 |
| (United States) Dreyer & Reinbold Racing | 24 | (United States) Miles Maroney | All |
| (United States) Dreyer & Reinbold Racing | 61 | (United States) Duncker Felix Jr. | 1 |
| (United States) Dreyer & Reinbold Racing | 61 | (United States) Alex Keyes | 2–12 |
| (Colombia) AF Racing | 42 | (United States) Nur Ali | All |
| (Colombia) AF Racing | 126 | (Colombia) Alejandro Fernández | All |
| (United States) Harlien Racing | 55 | (United States) Gavin Harlien | 4–6 |

== Results and standings ==
=== Events ===
| No. | Event | 3rd Place | 2nd Place | GRC Lites Winner | Winner | Winning team | Manufacturer |
|---|---|---|---|---|---|---|---|
| 1 | (United States) Red Bull Global Rallycross Florida | (Brazil) Nelson Piquet Jr. | (United States) Scott Speed | (United States) Austin Cindric | (United States) Ken Block | (United States) Hoonigan Racing Division | (United States) Ford |
| NC | (United States) X Games Austin | (Sweden) Sebastian Eriksson | (Canada) Steve Arpin | Did not participate | (United States) Scott Speed | (United States) Volkswagen Andretti Rallycross | (Germany) Volkswagen |
| 2 | (United States) Red Bull Global Rallycross Daytona | (Sweden) Sebastian Eriksson | (United States) Austin Dyne | (Sweden) Oliver Eriksson | (United States) Tanner Foust | (United States) Volkswagen Andretti Rallycross | (Germany) Volkswagen |
| 3 | (United States) Red Bull Global Rallycross Daytona | (Canada) Steve Arpin | (United States) Ken Block | (United States) Austin Cindric | (Sweden) Sebastian Eriksson | (Sweden) Olsbergs MSE | (United States) Ford |
| 4 | (United States) Red Bull Global Rallycross The Base | (Brazil) Nelson Piquet Jr. | (Sweden) Patrik Sandell | (United States) Alex Keyes | (United States) Ken Block | (United States) Hoonigan Racing Division | (United States) Ford |
| 5 | (United States) Red Bull Global Rallycross Detroit | (Sweden) Sebastian Eriksson | (United States) Scott Speed | (United States) Tanner Whitten | (United States) Ken Block | (United States) Hoonigan Racing Division | (United States) Ford |
| 6 | (United States) Red Bull Global Rallycross Detroit | (Sweden) Sebastian Eriksson | (United States) Scott Speed | (United States) Miles Maroney | (Sweden) Patrik Sandell | (United States) Bryan Herta Rallysport | (United States) Ford |
| 7 | (United States) Red Bull Global Rallycross Washington DC | (United States) Ken Block | (Sweden) Patrik Sandell | (United States) Alex Keyes | (Brazil) Nelson Piquet Jr. | (United States) SH Racing Rallycross | (United States) Ford |
| 8 | (United States) Red Bull Global Rallycross Los Angeles | (Sweden) Patrik Sandell | (United States) Tanner Foust | (Sweden) Oliver Eriksson | (United States) Scott Speed | (United States) Volkswagen Andretti Rallycross | (Germany) Volkswagen |
| 9 | (United States) Red Bull Global Rallycross Los Angeles | (United States) Tanner Foust | (United States) Brian Deegan | (United States) Austin Cindric | (United States) Scott Speed | (United States) Volkswagen Andretti Rallycross | (Germany) Volkswagen |
| 10 | Red Bull Global Rallycross Barbados | (Brazil) Nelson Piquet Jr. | (United States) Scott Speed | (Sweden) Oliver Eriksson | (United States) Tanner Foust | (United States) Volkswagen Andretti Rallycross | (Germany) Volkswagen |
| 11 | Red Bull Global Rallycross Barbados | (Finland) Joni Wiman | (United States) Scott Speed | (United States) Austin Cindric | (United States) Tanner Foust | (United States) Volkswagen Andretti Rallycross | (Germany) Volkswagen |
| 12 | (United States) Red Bull Global Rallycross Las Vegas | (United States) Scott Speed | (Sweden) Sebastian Eriksson | (United States) Alex Keyes | (Finland) Joni Wiman | (Sweden) Olsbergs MSE | (United States) Ford |

=== Drivers' championships ===
Points are awarded to event finishers using the following structure:

| Position | **1st** | **2nd** | **3rd** | **4th** | **5th** | **6th** | **7th** | **8th** | **9th** | **10th** | **Others** |
| Points | 50 | 45 | 40 | 35 | 30 | 25 | 20 | 15 | 10 | 5 | 1 |

In addition, points are awarded in the second and third rounds of heats. First place earns three points, second place earns two points, and all other drivers to start the heat earn one point.

==== Supercars ====
| Pos. | Driver | Team | (United States) FTA | (United States) AUS† | (United States) DAY1 | (United States) DAY2 | (United States) MCAS | (United States) DET1 | (United States) DET2 | (United States) DC | (United States) LA1 | (United States) LA2 | (Barbados) BAR1 | (Barbados) BAR2 | (United States) LV | Pts. |
|---|---|---|---|---|---|---|---|---|---|---|---|---|---|---|---|---|
| 1 | (United States) Scott Speed | Volkswagen Andretti Rallycross | **2**^{2} | **1**^{1} | DNS | 9 | **DNS**^{1} | 2 | 2^{1} | **7**^{LCQ} | 1^{2 A} | **1**^{1 A} | 2 | 2 | 3^{1 B} | 456 |
| 2 | (Sweden) Sebastian Eriksson | Olsbergs MSE | 4 | 3^{1} | 3^{LCQ} | 1^{1 B} | 9^{B} | 3 | 3 | 6 | 13 | 7 | 4 | 7 | 2^{1} | 400 |
| 3 | (United States) Tanner Foust | Volkswagen Andretti Rallycross | 5^{LCQ} | 5^{LCQ} | 1 | 5 | DNS | 10 | 10^{B} | 5 | **2** | 3^{1 B} | 1^{B} | 1^{1 B} | 9 | 388 |
| 4 | (Brazil) Nelson Piquet Jr. | SH Racing Rallycross | 3^{2} | | 7 | 6 | 3 | 8 | **9** | 1^{2 B} | 8^{2} | DSQ | 5^{LCQ} | 3 | 6^{1} | 380 |
| 5 | (Finland) Joni Wiman | Olsbergs MSE | DNS^{1} | 14 | 4 | 8 | 8^{1} | 5^{LCQ} | 4 | 10^{1} | 9 | 8 | 3 | 5 | 1^{A} | 370 |
| 6 | (Canada) Steve Arpin | Chip Ganassi Racing | 7^{1 A} | 2 | 5 | 3 | 5^{1} | 7 | 11 | 4 | 5 | 5^{1} | 8 | 4 | **4**^{1} | 357 |
| 7 | (United States) Ken Block | Hoonigan Racing Division | 1^{B} | 11 | 8^{2 B} | 2^{A} | 1^{A} | **1**^{1 A} | 7 | 3 | 11 | 9 | 11 | 10 | 10 | 345 |
| 8 | (Sweden) Patrik Sandell | Bryan Herta Rallysport | DNS | DNS | **9**^{2 A} | 10 | 2^{1} | 9^{1 B} | 1^{1 A} | 2^{A} | 3^{B} | 4^{LCQ} | DSQ | 6 | DNS | 328 |
| 9 | (United States) Austin Dyne | Bryan Herta Rallysport | 6 | 8 | 2 | 7^{LCQ} | 4 | 6 | 6 | 8 | DNS | 11 | 9^{A} | **8**^{1} | 7 | 277 |
| 10 | (United States) Brian Deegan | Chip Ganassi Racing | | 4 | | | 10 | 4 | 5^{LCQ} | | 6^{2} | 2 | 6^{1} | 9^{LCQ} | 5^{LCQ} | 229 |
| 11 | (Norway) Sverre Isachsen | Subaru Rally Team USA | 9 | 10 | DNS | 11 | 6 | 12 | DNS | | 4 | 13 | 7 | 12 | DNS | 136 |
| 12 | (United States) Bucky Lasek | Subaru Rally Team USA | 10 | 7 | DNS | 12 | 7^{LCQ} | 11 | 8 | | DNS | DNS | | | 8 | 88 |
Guest drivers ineligible for points
| | (United States) Jeff Ward | Chip Ganassi Racing | | | 6^{1} | **4**^{1} | | | | 9^{1} | | | | | | 0 |
| | (United States) Travis Pastrana | Subaru Rally Team USA | | 13 | | | | | | | 7^{LCQ} | 6 | | | | 0 |
| | (Norway) Andreas Bakkerud | SH Racing Rallycross | | 6^{1} | | | | | | | | | | | | 0 |
| | (Puerto Rico) Victor Gonzalez Jr. | Rhys Millen Racing | 8 | | | | | | | | | | | | | 0 |
| | (United Kingdom) Liam Doran | LD Motorsports | | 9 | | | | | | | | | | | | 0 |
| | (United States) Rhys Millen | Rhys Millen Racing | | | | | | | | | | | DNS | 11 | | 0 |
| | (United States) Logan Gomez | Royal Purple Racing | | | | | | | | 11 | | | | | | 0 |
| | (United States) Pat Moro | PMR Motorsports | | 12 | | | | | | 12 | | | | | 11 | 0 |
| | (United States) Brian Wong | Rhys Millen Racing | | | | | | | | | 12 | 12 | | | | 0 |
| | (United Kingdom) David Higgins | Subaru Rally Team USA | | | | | | | | | 14 | 14 | | | 12 | 0 |

| Colour | Result |
|---|---|
| Gold | Winner |
| Silver | Second place |
| Bronze | Third place |
| Green | Points classification |
| Blue | Non-points classification |
| Blue | Non-classified finish (NC) |
| Purple | Retired, not classified (Ret) |
| Red | Did not qualify (DNQ) |
| Red | Did not pre-qualify (DNPQ) |
| Black | Disqualified (DSQ) |
| White | Did not start (DNS) |
| White | Withdrew (WD) |
| White | Race cancelled (C) |
| Blank | Did not practice (DNP) |
| Blank | Did not arrive (DNA) |
| Blank | Excluded (EX) |

**Bold** – Fastest time in qualifying
^{1 2} – Number of heat wins
^{A B} – Winner of Semifinal A or B
^{LCQ} – Winner of the Last Chance Qualifier

Notes:

- † — Non-championship round

==== GRC Lites ====
| Pos. | Driver | Team | (United States) FTA | (United States) DAY1 | (United States) DAY2 | (United States) MCAS | (United States) DET1 | (United States) DET2 | (United States) DC | (United States) LA1 | (United States) LA2 | (Barbados) BAR1 | (Barbados) BAR2 | (United States) LV | Pts. |
|---|---|---|---|---|---|---|---|---|---|---|---|---|---|---|---|
| 1 | (Sweden) Oliver Eriksson | Olsbergs MSE | 3 | 1^{2} | 10^{2} | 2^{1} | 5^{1} | **7**^{LCQ} | **2**^{2} | 1^{1} | 3 | 1^{2} | 2^{1} | **3** | 501 |
| 2 | (United States) Austin Cindric | Olsbergs MSE | **1**^{2} | 9^{1} | **1**^{2} | 5^{1} | 3 | 3 | 8 | 2 | **1**^{2} | 2 | **1**^{2} | 10 | 473 |
| 3 | (United States) Miles Maroney | Dreyer & Reinbold Racing | 7 | 3 | 4 | 4^{1} | 2 | 1^{2} | 3 | **4** | 2 | 5 | 4 | 8 | 441 |
| 4 | (Colombia) Alejandro Fernández | AF Racing | 2^{2} | 2 | 6 | 6^{LCQ} | 4 | 2^{2} | 4 | 7 | 6 | **3** | 3 | 5^{LCQ} | 427 |
| 5 | (United States) Tanner Whitten | DirtFish Motorsports | 4 | **4**^{1} | 2 | 3 | 1^{1} | 10 | 9 | 10^{1} | 4^{1} | 6^{1} | 6 | 4 | 376 |
| 6 | (United States) Alex Keyes | Dreyer & Reinbold Racing | | 5^{LCQ} | 5 | **1**^{1} | **9** | DNS | 1^{2} | 3^{2} | 9^{1} | 4^{1} | 10^{1} | 1^{1} | 350 |
| 7 | (United States) Nur Ali | AF Racing | 6^{LCQ} | 6 | 9 | 9 | 10 | 4 | 7 | 6 | 7 | 9 | 7 | 13 | 226 |
| 8 | (United States) Harry Cheung | Rhys Millen Racing | | 8 | 3^{LCQ} | | 6^{LCQ} | 9 | | 5 | 8 | 10 | 5 | | 185 |
| 9 | (United States) Collete Davis | River Racing with Bryan Herta Rallysport | 9 | 11 | 8 | 10 | 8 | 6 | 10 | 8 | 10 | 8 | 8 | 12 | 146 |
| 10 | (United States) Connor Martell | Rhys Millen Racing | | | | 7 | | | | 9 | 5 | | | | 67 |
| 11 | (United States) Geoff Sykes | DTV Solutions | 5 | DNS | 7 | | | | | | | | | | 62 |
| 12 | (Australia) Blake Williams | Rhys Millen Racing | | | | | | | | | | 7 | 9 | 7 | 55 |
| 13 | (United States) Brian Wong | Rhys Millen Racing | | | | | 7 | 5 | | | | | | | 53 |
| 14 | (Sweden) Andreas Wernersson | Rhys Millen Racing | | | | | | | | | | | | 2^{1} | 48 |
| 15 | (United States) Jackie Heinricher | Rhys Millen Racing | 8 | 7 | 11 | 11 | | | | | | | | | 45 |
| 16 | (United States) Gavin Harlien | Harlien Racing | | | | 8 | DNS | 8 | | | | | | | 36 |
| 17 | (Norway) Joachim Hvaal | Olsbergs MSE | | | | | | | 5 | | | | | | 32 |
| 18 | (Paraguay) Blas Zapag | Rhys Millen Racing | | | | | | | 6 | | | | | | 27 |
| 19 | (United States) Augie Lerch | Buhl Sport Detroit | | | | | | | | | | | | 6 | 26 |
| 20 | (United States) Gustavo Menezes | Olsbergs MSE | | | | | | | | | | | | 9 | 11 |
| 21 | (United States) Duncker Felix Jr. | Dreyer & Reinbold Racing | DNS | | | | | | | | | | | | 7 |
| 22 | (Sweden) Sandra Hultgren | Olsbergs MSE | | | | | | | | | | | | 11 | 2 |
| 23 | (France) Stephan Verdier | Rhys Millen Racing | | | | | | | | | | | | 14 | 1 |

=== Manufacturers' championship ===
No Manufacturers' championship in GRC Lites class

| Pos. | Manufacturer | Pts. |
|---|---|---|
| 1 | (United States) Ford | 55 |
| 2 | (Germany) Volkswagen | 52 |
| 3 | (Japan) Subaru | 34 |
