= Patrik Sandell =

Swedish rally driver (born 1982)

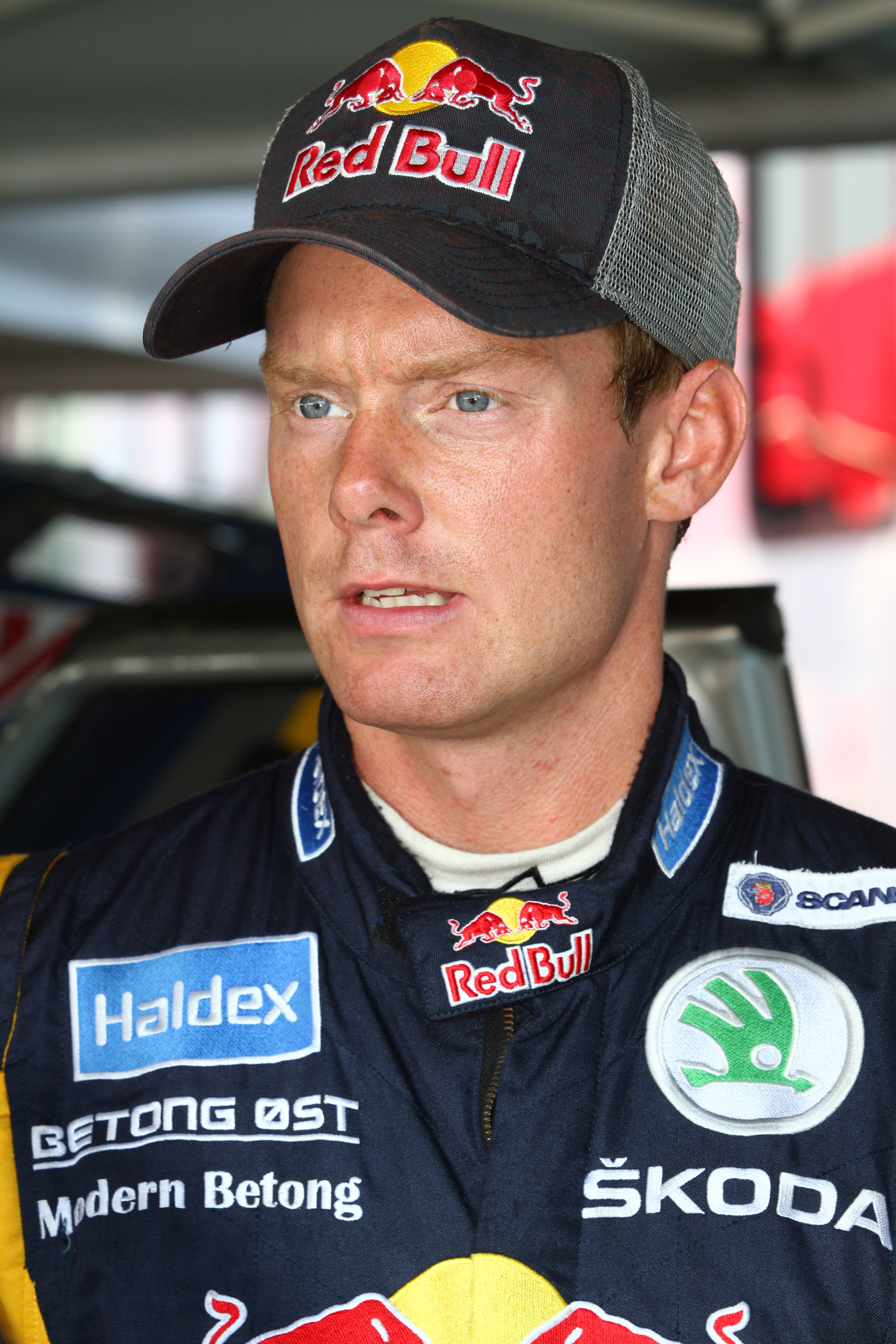
- Sandell in 2011
- Nationality: Swedish
- Born: Anders Patrik Sandell; April 21, 1982 (age 44)

Global Rallycross career
- Debut season: 2013
- Current team: Subaru Rally Team USA
- Car number: 18
- Former teams: Olsbergs MSE; Bryan Herta Rallysport
- Starts: 54
- Wins: 3
- Podiums: 14
- Best finish: 6th in 2013 and 2014
- Finished last season: 8th

Previous series
- 2005–2012: World Rally Championship

Championship titles
- 2006 2005 2004 2003: Junior World Rally Championship; Swedish Group N3 Championship; Swedish Junior Karting Championship
Medal record
Representing Sweden
Summer X Games
Silver medal – second place	2013 Los Angeles	Ford Gymkhana GRID
Bronze medal – third place	2013 Foz do Iguaçu	Ford RallyCross

Anders Patrik Sandell (born April 21, 1982) is a rally driver from Sweden. Sandell won the Swedish Junior Championship in 2004 and the Swedish Group N3 Championship in 2005. In 2006, he won the Junior World Rally Championship (JWRC) title driving for Renault. In 2008, Sandell contested both the JWRC and the Production World Rally Championship (PWRC).

Sandell joined Olsbergs MSE to drive a Ford Fiesta at the Global RallyCross Championship in 2013. He finished 6th in the standings, scoring two podiums. In 2014, he won a race and finished in the overall championship in 6th place. He joined Bryan Herta Rallysport in 2015, driving with sponsorship from Kobalt Tools.

== Biography ==
Sandell’s interest in motorsport came as a teenager. He was 16 when he first tried rallycross, and 17 when he ran his first rally. Sandell won his first championship in 2004 when he won the Swedish Junior Championship, and won the Swedish Group N3 title in 2005.

In 2006, Sandell contested the Junior World Rally Championship and won the title with a win and three podiums in six starts. Over the next few years, he would continue racing in the JWRC, Production World Rally Championship, and Super 2000 World Rally Championship, earning victories in all three classes. Sandell became a Red Bull athlete in 2009 and won his first two PWRC starts that year in Norway and Cyprus.

In 2012, Sandell made his debut with the Mini WRC Team at his native 2012 Rally Sweden and finished a career-best eighth. Mini parent BMW later terminated its contract with Prodrive, and Sandell no longer raced in WRC after the 2012 season.

For 2013, Sandell moved to the Global RallyCross Championship and joined Olsbergs MSE. He earned his first podium in his first GRC start at X Games Brazil, and finished the year sixth in points. He replicated that result in 2014, also earning his first career win in a race at RFK Stadium that June.

In 2015, Sandell switched to the new Bryan Herta Rallysport team. Sandell would spend the 2015 and 2016 seasons with the team, winning once each year.

Sandell accepted a new drive with Subaru Rally Team USA for 2017 and finished eighth in points. He earned his first podium of the season in the first Atlantic City round. In 2018, Sandell continued to compete for the team in the newly established Americas Rallycross series, where he finished third in points. Sandell also returned to stage rally for three American Rally Association events in 2018, winning all three.

Sandell continued to compete in Americas Rallycross for the newly rebranded Subaru Motorsports team in 2019.

== Racing record ==
=== Complete WRC results ===
(key)

Year	Entrant	Car	1	2	3	4	5	6	7	8	9	10	11	12	13	14	15	16	WDC	Points
2005	Patrik Sandell	Renault Clio Ragnotti	MON	SWE; Ret	MEX	NZL	ITA	CYP	TUR	GRE	ARG	FIN	GER	GBR	JPN	FRA	ESP	AUS	NC	0
2006	Patrik Sandell	Renault Clio S1600	MON	SWE; 20	MEX	ESP	FRA	ARG; 22	ITA; 15	GRE	GER	FIN; 34	JPN	CYP	TUR; 30	AUS	NZL	GBR; 33	NC	0
2007	Patrik Sandell	Renault Clio S1600	MON	SWE	NOR; 21	MEX	POR; 53	ARG	ITA; 31	GRE	FIN; 18	GER; EX	NZL	ESP; Ret	FRA	JPN	IRE	GBR	NC	0
2008	Peugeot Sport Sweden	Peugeot 207 S2000	MON	SWE; 11		ARG; Ret			GRE; Ret	TUR; 12		GER; 22				JPN	GBR; Ret		NC	0
2008	Peugeot Sport Sweden	Mitsubishi Lancer Evo IX											NZL; 11						NC	0
2008	Interspeed Racing Team	Renault Clio S1600			MEX; 13		JOR; Ret	ITA; 26			FIN; 21			ESP; 23					NC	0
2008	Interspeed Racing Team	Renault Clio R3													FRA; 28				NC	0
2009	Red Bull Rallye Team	Škoda Fabia S2000	IRE	NOR; 12	CYP; 9	POR; Ret	ARG	ITA; 10	GRE; 24	POL	FIN	AUS	ESP	GBR; 21					NC	0
2010	Red Bull Rallye Team	Škoda Fabia S2000	SWE; 15	MEX	JOR; 23	TUR	NZL; 12	POR	BUL	FIN; 11	GER; 10	JPN	FRA; 10	ESP	GBR; 14				23rd	2
2011	Patrik Sandell	Škoda Fabia S2000	SWE; 11	MEX	POR	JOR	ITA	ARG	GRE	FIN	GER	AUS	FRA	ESP	GBR				NC	0
2012	Mini WRC Team	Mini John Cooper Works WRC	MON	SWE; 8	MEX														27th	4
2012	Prodrive WRC Team	Mini John Cooper Works WRC				POR; Ret	ARG	GRE	NZL	FIN	GER	GBR	FRA	ITA	ESP				27th	4

==== JWRC results ====
Year	Entrant	Car	1	2	3	4	5	6	7	8	9	JWRC	Points
2006	Patrik Sandell	Renault Clio S1600	SWE; 2	ESP	FRA	ARG; 2	ITA; 1	GER	FIN; 7	TUR; 11	GBR; 6	1st	32
2007	Patrik Sandell	Renault Clio R3	NOR; 2	POR; 15	ITA; 8	FIN; 1	GER; EX	ESP	FRA			6th	19
2008	Interspeed Racing Team	Renault Clio S1600	MEX; 5	JOR; Ret	ITA; 7	FIN; 2	GER	ESP; 5				7th	21
2008	Interspeed Racing Team	Renault Clio R3							FRA; 6			7th	21

==== Complete PWRC results ====
Year	Entrant	Car	1	2	3	4	5	6	7	8	PWRC	Points
2008	Peugeot Sport Sweden	Peugeot 207 S2000	SWE; 3	ARG; Ret	GRE; Ret	TUR; 2	FIN			GBR; Ret	4th	22
2008	Peugeot Sport Sweden	Mitsubishi Lancer Evo IX						NZL; 2	JPN		4th	22
2009	Red Bull Rallye Team	Škoda Fabia S2000	NOR; 1	CYP; 1	POR; Ret	ARG	ITA; 2	GRE; 11	AUS	GBR; 7	4th	30

==== Complete SWRC results ====
Year	Entrant	Car	1	2	3	4	5	6	7	8	9	10	SWRC	Points
2010	Red Bull Rallye Team	Škoda Fabia S2000	SWE; 4	MEX	JOR; 5	NZL; 4	POR	FIN; 3	GER; 1	JPN	FRA; 1	GBR; 4	2nd	112

=== IRC results ===
Year	Entrant	Car	1	2	3	4	5	6	7	8	9	10	11	IRC	Points
2011	Škoda Sweden	Škoda Fabia S2000	MON	CAN	COR; 9	YAL; 9	YPR	AZO; 5	ZLI; 12	MEC	SAN	SCO; Ret	CYP; 3	8th	44

=== Complete FIA European Rallycross Championship results ===
(key)

==== Supercar ====
Year	Entrant	Car	1	2	3	4	5	6	7	8	9	ERX	Points
2013	Olsbergs MSE	Ford Fiesta	GBR	POR	HUN	FIN	NOR	SWE; 9	FRA	AUT	GER	22nd	14

=== Complete Global Rallycross Championship results ===
(key)

==== Supercar ====
Year	Entrant	Car	1	2	3	4	5	6	7	8	9	10	11	12	GRC	Points
2013	Kobalt Tools Olsbergs MSE	Ford Fiesta ST	BRA; 3	MUN1; 8	MUN2; 13	LOU; 2	BRI; 5	IRW; 8	ATL; 11	CHA; 13	LV; 7				6th	89
2014	Kobalt Tools Olsbergs MSE	Ford Fiesta ST	BAR; 8	AUS; 6	DC; 1	NY; 10	CHA; 13	DAY; 4	LA1; 5	LA2; 7	SEA; 7	LV; 10			6th	246
2015	Bryan Herta Rallysport	Ford Fiesta ST	FTA; 11	DAY1; 9	DAY2; 10	MCAS; 2	DET1; 9	DET2; 1	DC; 2	LA1; 3	LA2; 4	BAR1; DSQ	BAR2; 10	LV; 13	8th	328
2016	Bryan Herta Rallysport	Ford Fiesta ST	PHO1; 2	PHO2; 4	DAL; 1	DAY1; 8	DAY2; 8	MCAS1; 4	MCAS2; C	DC; 2	AC; 2	SEA; 11	LA1; 5	LA2; 3	5th	436
2017	Subaru Rally Team USA	Subaru Impreza WRX STI	MEM; 9	LOU	THO1; 6	THO2; 5	OTT1; 9	OTT2; 7	INDY; 8	AC1; 2	AC2; 10	SEA1; 7	SEA2; 3	LA; 3	8th	582

=== RallyX on Ice ===
(key)

Year	Car	1	2	3	4	RallyX	Points
2016	Lites Ford Fiesta	PIT; 11	SAL; 14	TRY; 4	ARE; 6	7th	16

Sporting positions
Preceded by Dani Sordo	Junior World Rally Champion; 2006	Succeeded by Per-Gunnar Andersson
