= Bilko =

Bilko may refer to:

- Ernest G. Bilko, main protagonist of The Phil Silvers Show
- Sgt. Bilko, a 1996 film adaptation of The Phil Silvers Show, starring Steve Martin
- Steve Bilko, a baseball player
- Blake Williams, an Australian professional freestyle motocross rider
