= Alejandro Fernández (racing driver) =

Colombian racing driver

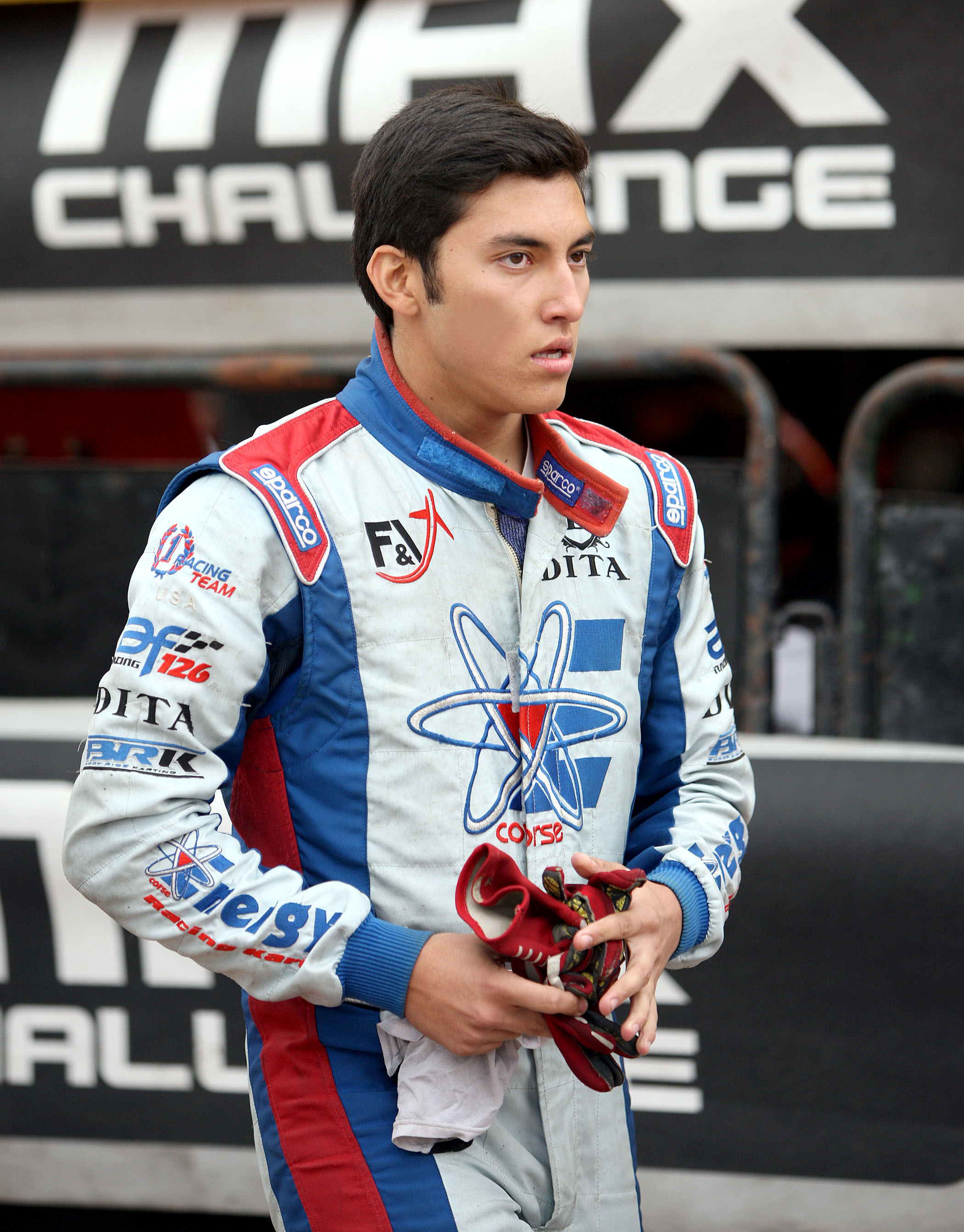
- Nationality: (Colombia) Colombian
- Born: January 26, 1996 (age 30) Bogotá, Colombia

Global RallyCross Championship Lites career
- Debut season: 2014
- Current team: Olsbergs MSE Team - AFRacing126
- Car number: 126

Alejandro Fernández (born January 26, 1996) is a Colombian race car driver. He currently participates in the North American karting as well as the Red Bull Global Rallycross Championship in the class GRC Lites.

== Career ==
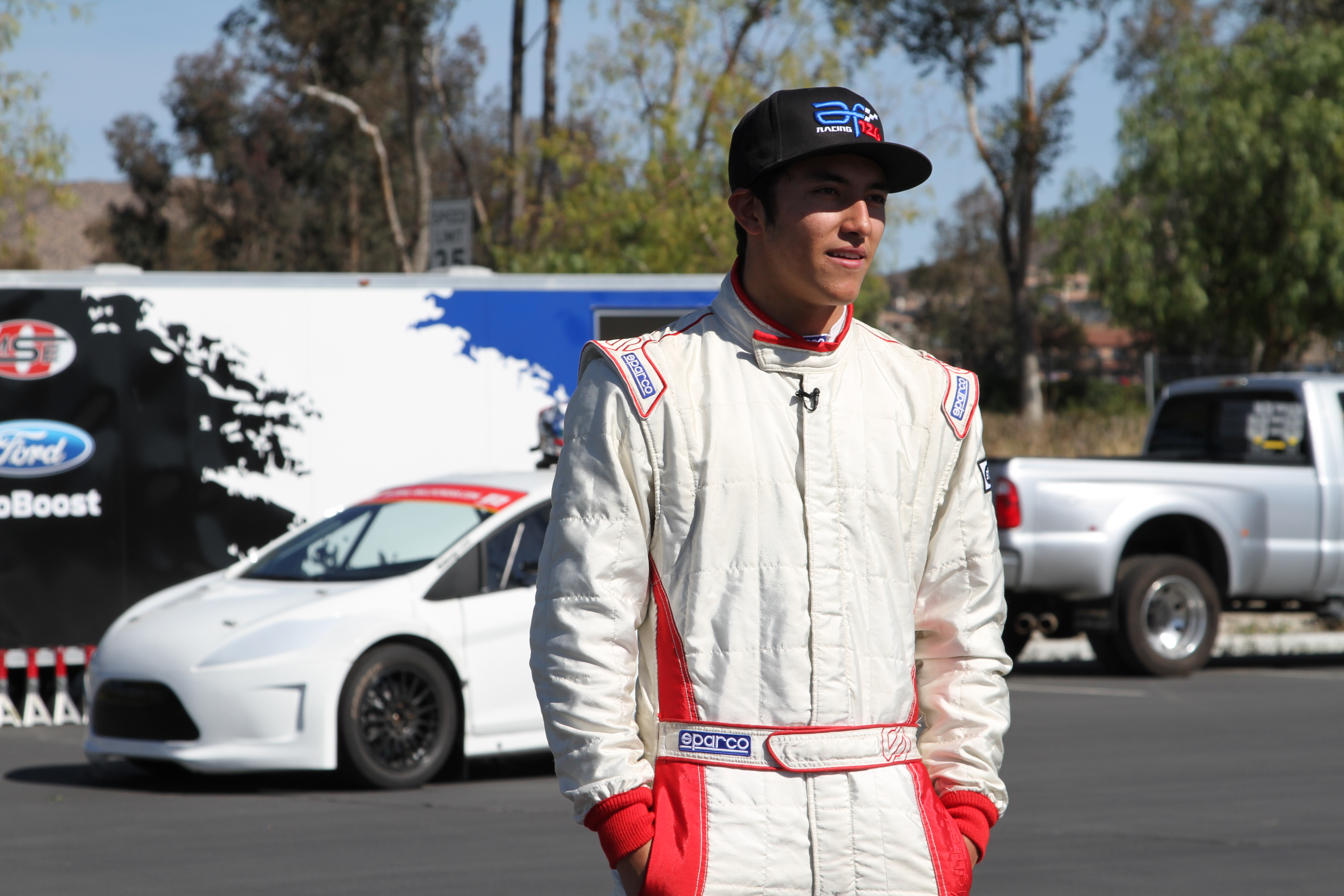
Fernández at a GRC Lites event

Fernández's career in the world of motorsports began at age 16 when his family bought him his first Go-Kart as a birthday present. Two months late, he began to race in his first competitions in the United States.

Since 2012, Fernández has raced in several championships. In 2012, he raced in championships like Challenge of the Americas, California Prokart Challenge, SKUSA Pro Tour, International Karting Federation (IKF), among others. The following year, Fernández competed in the Florida Winter Tour, U.S. Grand Nationals, Los Angeles Kart Championship (LAKC) as well as championships in his homeland, including the Rotax Max Challenge Colombia and La Carrera de las Estrella which was organized by Fundación Sonrisas in Medellín.

Fernández also ran in different classes of motorsports, such as the F2000, Mazda Pro, Rallycars, Trophy Trucks and Sportscars.

=== BMX ===
In his childhood, Fernández raced BMX and competed in the ABA BMX World Championships in 2003. Due to a broken hand, he had to withdraw from the tracks.

In the United States, Fernández participated in championships such as the ABA (American Bicycle Association) and the NBL (National Bicycle League). In Colombia he raced “La Rueda de Oro”.

=== Buddy Rice Karting ===
Throughout his racing career, Fernández has always been accompanied by Buddy Rice, a North American race car driver and owner of Buddy Rice Karting.

In 2014, Rice continued to accompany Fernández as his mentor in the GRC Lites Class.

=== Rallycross ===
In November 2013, Fernández participated in a private test for the Global Rallycross Championship in Las Vegas. As a result of this opportunity, Fernández was awarded a position in the championship in the GRC Lites Class.

In 2014, Fernández joined the Global Rallycross Championship, the first Colombian and Latin American driver in the series.

=== Career timeline ===
==== 2012 ====
- 2012 Challenge of the Americas Senior Max
- 2012 California ProKart Challenge Tag Sr
- 2012 SKUSA ProTour Tag Sr
- 2012 IKF Tag Sr
- 2012 IKF PRD Sr
- 2012 Tri-C Karters Championship
- 2012 US Grand Rotax Nationals
- 2012 LAKC Tag Sr
- 2012 LAKC PRD Sr

==== 2013 ====
- 2013 Challenge of the Americas Senior Max
- 2013 California ProKart Challenge tag Sr
- 2013 SKUSA ProTour Tag Sr
- 2013 Florida Winter Tour Rotax Sr
- 2013 Tri-C Grand Prix Rotax Sr
- 2013 Tri-C Grand Prix Tag Sr
- 2013 Tri-C karters Championship
- 2013 US Grand Nationals
- 2013 LAKC Tag Sr
- 2013 LAKC PRD SR
- 2013 PRD PAN-AM Crown of Karting
- 2013 Carrera de Las Estrellas. Medellín, Colombia.
- 2013 Rotax Max Challenge Colombia

==== 2014 ====
- 2014 Rotax Max Challenge Colombia Senior Max
- 2014 Challenge of the Americas Senior Max
- 2014 LAKC S2
- 2014 LAKC Tag Sr
- 2014 So-Cal Rotax Challenge Senior Max
- Redbull Global Rallycross, GRC Lites Class

== Achievements ==
- LAKC 2012 Tag Senior Champion
- LAKC 2013 Tag Senior Champion
- IKF 2013 PRD Senior National Champion
- Tri-C Grand Prix 2013 Rotax Senior Runner-up
- 3rd Tri-C Grand Prix 2013 Tag Senior
- 3rd Nationals Championship IKF 2013 KPV4
- 3rd LAKC 2013 PRD Senior Championship
- 3rd Challenge of The Americas 2013 Tucson, AZ
- Top 18 U.S. Nationals Rotax 2013
- Top 25 of 91, SKUSA USA Tag Senior.

== Racing record ==
=== Complete Global Rallycross Championship results ===
(key)

==== GRC Lites ====
| Year | Entrant | Car | 1 | 2 | 3 | 4 | 5 | 6 | 7 | 8 | 9 | 10 | 11 | 12 | Lites | Points |
|---|---|---|---|---|---|---|---|---|---|---|---|---|---|---|---|---|
| 2015 | AF Racing | Lites Ford Fiesta | FTA; 2 | DAY1; 2 | DAY2; 6 | MCAS; 6 | DET1; 4 | DET2; 2 | DC; 4 | LA1; 7 | LA2; 6 | BAR1; 3 | BAR2; 3 | LV; 5 | 4th | 427 |
| 2016 | AF Racing | Lites Ford Fiesta | PHO1; 12 | PHO2; DSQ | DAL; 7 | DAY1; 5 | DAY2; 9 | MCAS1; 6 | MCAS2; C | DC; 6 | AC; 10 | SEA; 4 | LA1; 6 | LA2; 5 | 7th | 256 |
| 2017 | AF Racing | Lites Ford Fiesta | MEM; 6 | LOU; 11 | THO1; 9 | THO2; 10 | OTT1; 5 | OTT2; 7 | INDY | AC1; 8 | AC2; 8 | SEA1; 9 | SEA2; 4 | LA; 10 | 8th | 458 |

== Links ==
- Official website Alejandro Fernández
- Official Press Release Global Rallycross 2014
- Interview at Blu Radio. Bogotá, Colombia. December 2013
- Wikipedia en español de Alejandro Fernández
