= Chris Atkinson =

Australian rally driver (born 1979)

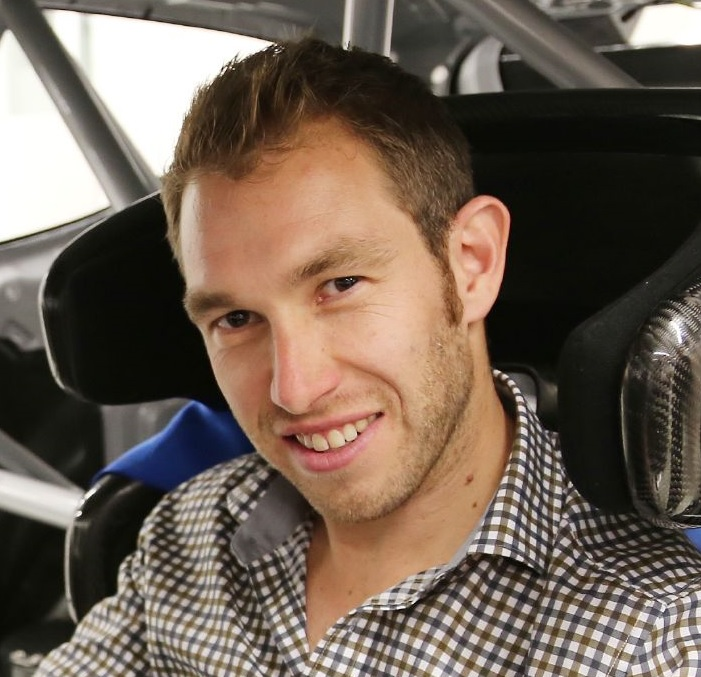
- Chris Atkinson in 2013
- Nationality: (Australia) Australian
- Born: Christopher James Atkinson; 30 November 1979 (age 46) Bega, New South Wales, Australia

Global Rallycross career
- Debut season: 2016
- Current team: Subaru Rally Team USA
- Car number: 55
- Starts: 15
- Wins: 0
- Podiums: 2
- Best finish: 7th in 2017

World Rally Championship record
- Years active: 2004–2009, 2012–2014
- Co-driver: (Australia) Benjamin Atkinson (Australia) Glenn Macneall (Belgium) Stéphane Prévot
- Teams: Subaru World Rally Team, Citroën Junior Team, Monster World Rally Team, WRC Team Mini Portugal, Abu Dhabi Citroën Total WRT, Hyundai Shell World Rally Team
- Rallies: 77
- Championships: 0
- Rally wins: 0
- Podiums: 6
- Stage wins: 41
- Total points: 165
- First rally: 2004 Rally New Zealand
- Last rally: 2014 Rally Australia

Christopher James Atkinson (born 30 November 1979 in Bega, New South Wales, Australia) is a professional rally driver. In the World Rally Championship (WRC), Atkinson drove for the Subaru World Rally Team between 2004 and 2008. His best finish on an individual WRC event is second, which he achieved at the 2008 Rally México and Rally Argentina. Other podium placings include third-place finishes at the 2005 Rally Japan and the 2008 Monte Carlo Rally.

Atkinson drives for Team MRF, and competed in the 2012 Asia-Pacific Rally Championship and made a guest appearance in the World Rally Championship. Atkinson won the 2012 Asia-Pacific Rally Championship.

On 16 August 2012, it was announced that Atkinson would be the number one driver for the WRC Team Mini Portugal outfit for the last five races of the 2012 WRC season.

== Early career ==
Prior to his motorsport career, Atkinson had a career as a stockbroker. He graduated at Bond University in commerce, majoring in finance and accounting in 1999 after receiving an academic scholarship for studies. Atkinson was a co-driver for his brother Ben, but after attending a rally school with his brother, the pair swapped positions, scoring a class win and third overall. Atkinson's brother, Ben Atkinson, is a co-driver for Cody Crocker in APRC.

For his first full season of competition, Atkinson contested the Australian Rally Championship aboard a privately entered Group N Mitsubishi Lancer Evo, finishing inside the top ten in Group N and in the overall top 20 on every round he contested, as well as setting two second-fastest stage times. The Atkinsons finished ninth outright to become Privateer Champions. This performance brought Atkinson to the attention of Suzuki, who offered him the opportunity to drive one of its Super 1600 Ignis models with the Suzuki Sport team in the 2003 Asia-Pacific Rally Championship.

== WRC career ==
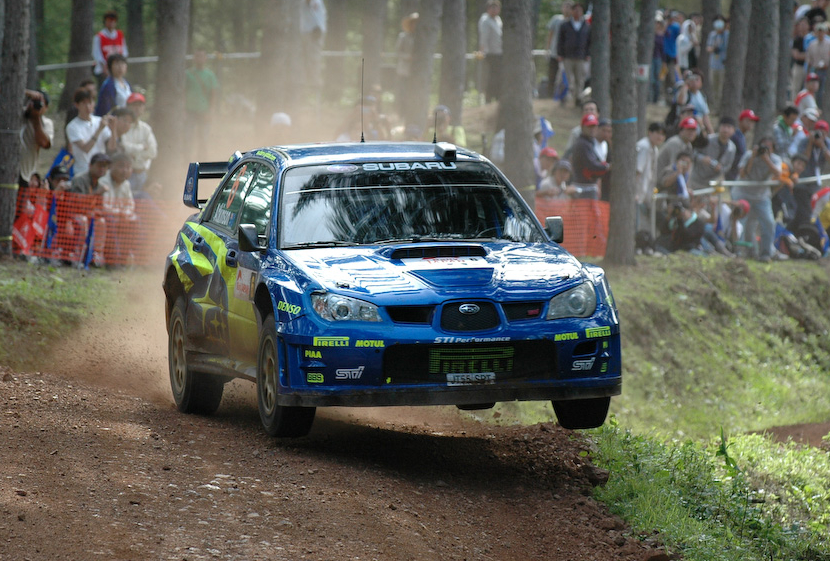
Atkinson at the 2006 Rally Japan.

Atkinson's first world rally was in 2004 at the Rally New Zealand in a Subaru Impreza WRX STI. For 2005, he was signed by Subaru World Rally Team to drive the Subaru Impreza WRC alongside 2003 world champion Petter Solberg. He finished 12th overall in the drivers' world championship with 13 points. His best results were third in Japan and fourth in Australia.

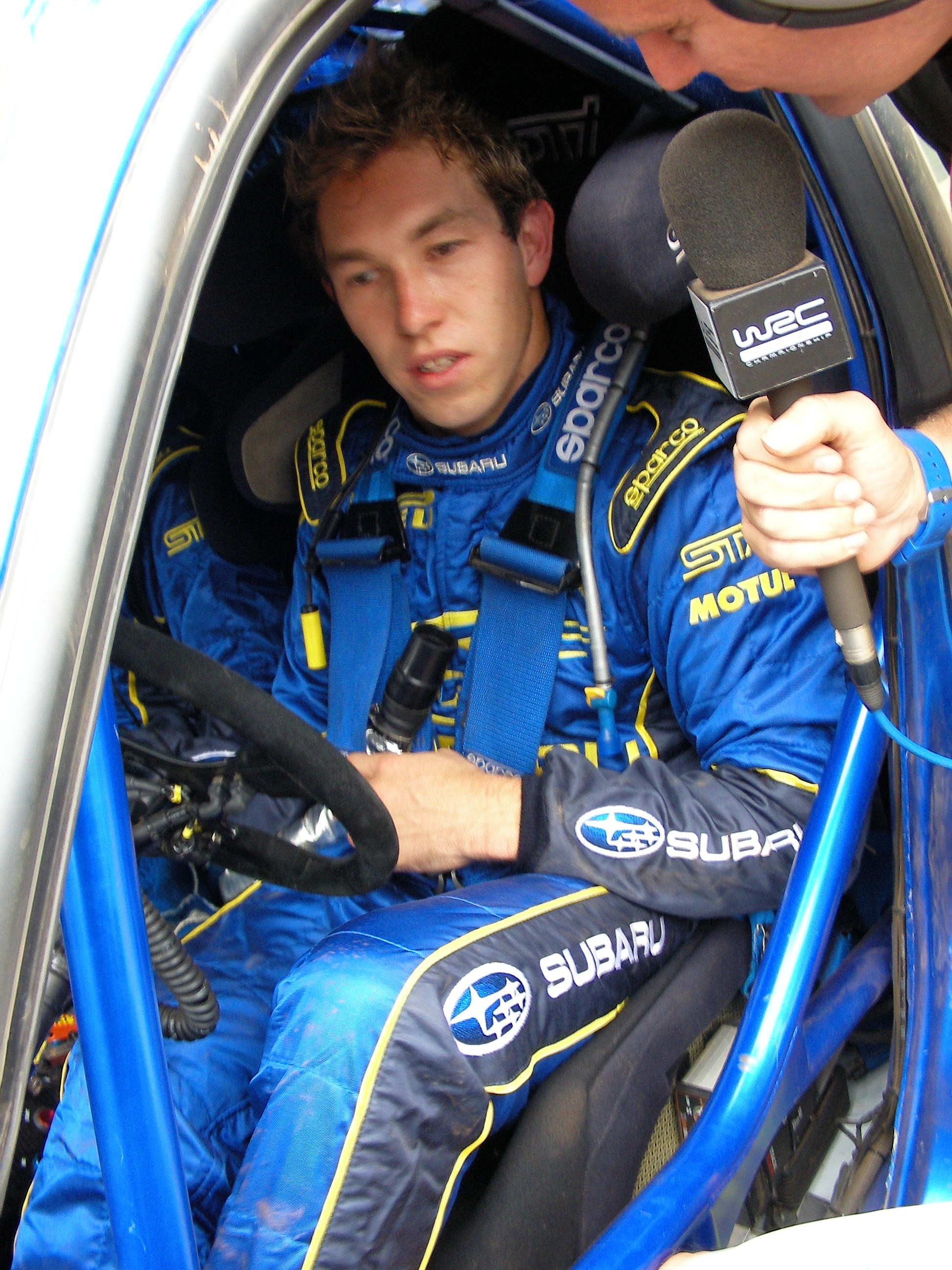
Atkinson at the 2006 Rally Australia.

After finishing the 2006 season tenth overall in the drivers championship with 20 points and a fourth place as his best finish, Subaru told Atkinson that his job was on the line, and if he could not balance his speed with safety and achieve quality results he would be replaced by another driver.

At the start of the 2007 season Atkinson finished fourth at the 2007 Rally Monte Carlo, recording three stage wins. On the final day of the rally, Atkinson was 0.8 seconds behind fourth place man Mikko Hirvonen and had to beat him in the super special stage, a 2.4 km run through Monaco which uses part of the world-famous Formula One course. Hirvonen set a time of 1:50.9 meaning that Atkinson had to at least set a time of 1:50.1 to beat him, but Atkinson did better and took the stage win with a time of 1:49.9. Hirvonen was the first person over to Atkinson to congratulate him.

At the 2007 Rally Finland, Atkinson posted the fastest time on the short opening super special stage on a horse-racing course at Killeri, to lead the rally for a short time. Atkinson finished the 2007 season seventh overall in the drivers' world championship.

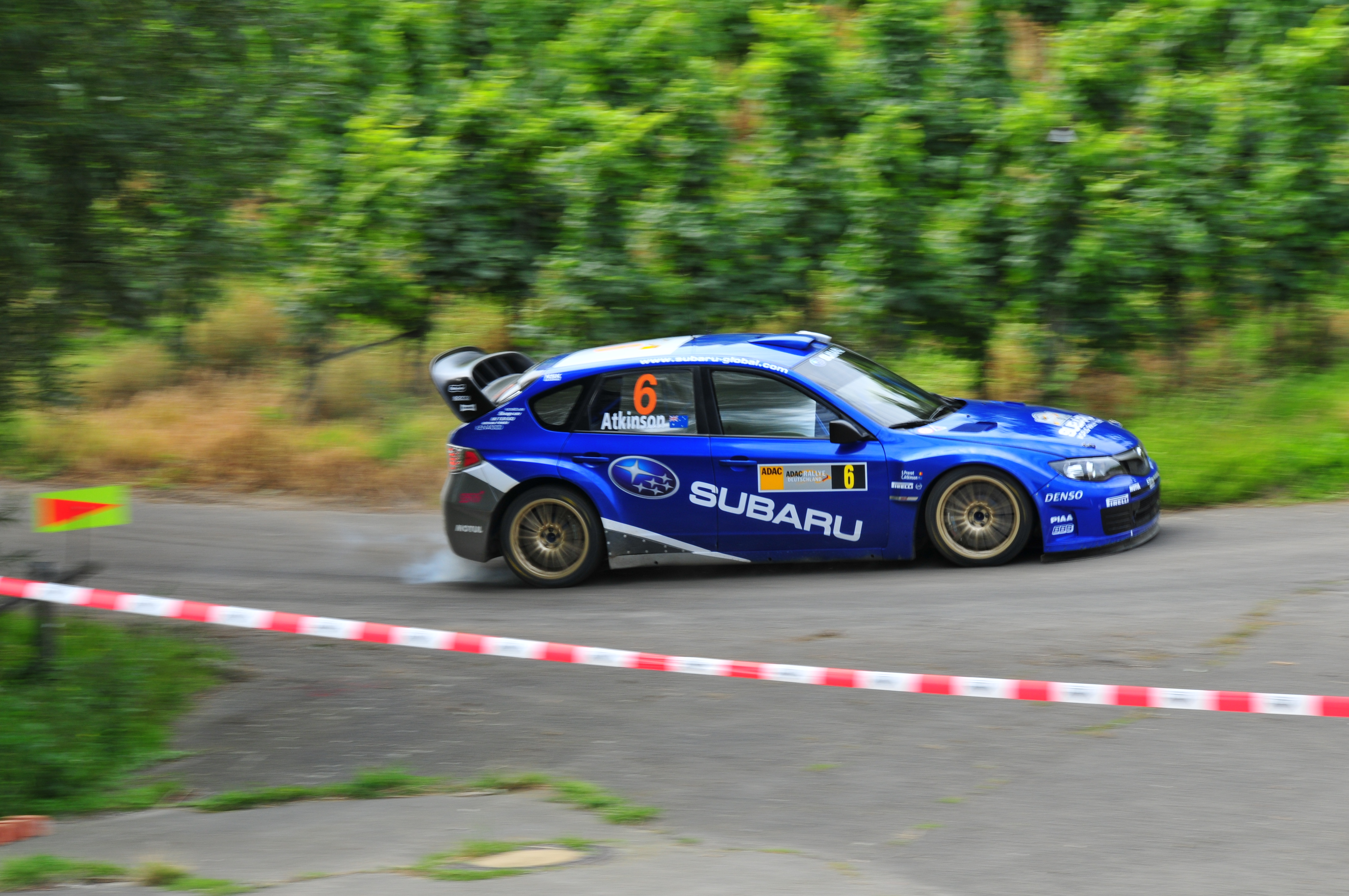
Atkinson at 2008 Rallye Deutschland

At the beginning of the 2008 season, Atkinson took third place in Monte Carlo; while at the 2008 Corona Rally Mexico, Atkinson managed second, 30 seconds ahead of Jari-Matti Latvala. He finished the season fifth in the drivers' standings, and for the first time, outscored hitherto team leader Solberg.

After Subaru's season-ending announcement of its withdrawal from the WRC, Atkinson signed for the new Citroën Junior Team for the 2009 season. In his only rally for the season with the team in Ireland, he produced a strong showing to finish fifth, despite colliding with a telegraph pole during the first day, and suffering a spin on SS18.

=== Re-entry into WRC (2012) ===
After signing with Monster World Rally Team in 2012, Atkinson raced alongside Ken Block in Mexico. Atkinson won a stage, SS12 – Leon Super Special but finished with a DNF due to mechanical failure.

Atkinson also signed up for a one-off drive in a Citroën DS3 WRC for the Qatar World Rally Team for Rally Finland. However, his medium term WRC future was granted when it was announced he would replace Armindo Araujo as the lead driver for the factory-backed WRC Team MINI Portugal in the last five rallies of the 2012 season.

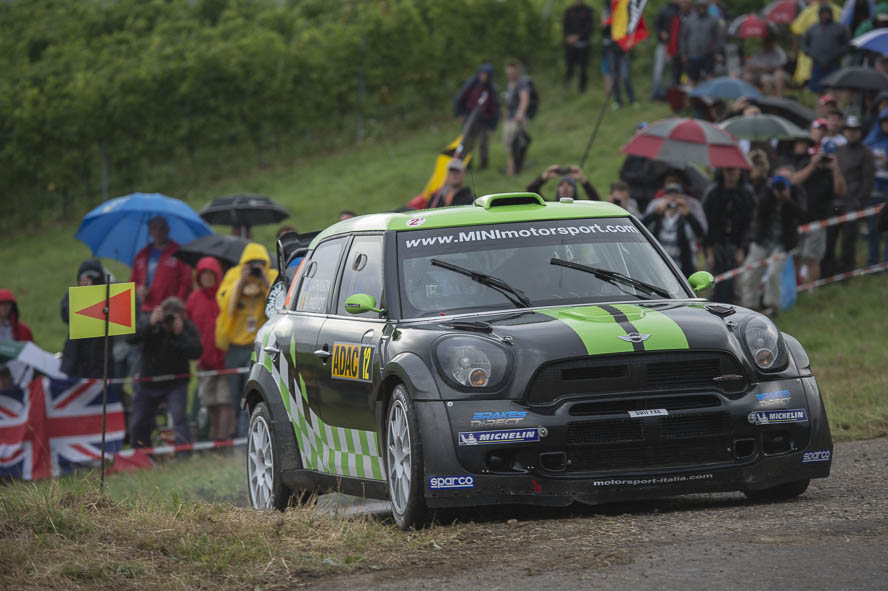
Atkinson at 2012 Rallye Deutschland

Atkinson contested the last five rounds of the 2012 WRC season with the Motorsport Italia-run MINI squad to finish the year 13th in the Championship. His best result for the year was achieved at Rallye Deutschland (Rally Germany) where he secured 5th behind the wheel of the MINI John Cooper Works WRC.

Atkinson was snapped up by the Citroën team for 2013, however, the team only used him for Rally Mexico, where he finished sixth, 11 minutes off the winner (Sebastien Ogier). Hyundai hired him mid-year as a test driver for their i20 rally car, which led to a part-time deal for 2014. In 2014, he raced at the rallies of Mexico and his home event in Australia, finishing seventh and tenth respectively. In both events, Atkinson was the last of the Hyundai drivers.

== Regional series ==
In April 2010, Atkinson began a partnership with the Proton R3 Rally Team. Competing in the Asia-Pacific Rally Championship (APRC), Atkinson drove a Proton Satria Neo Super 2000, alongside co-driver Stephane Prevot.

After making a guest appearance at the Intercontinental Rally Challenge (IRC) Monte Carlo Rally, Atkinson has dominated the 2011 APRC, winning the Malaysian Rally, Rallye de Nouvelle Caledonia and the International Rally of Whangarei. However missing round two in Queensland and the final round in Hokkaido saw him finish second to his teammate Alister McRae who competed in all rounds.

Atkinson competed in an Australian-run Skoda in the 2012 FIA Asia-Pacific Rally Championship, driving for the MRF team in a Skoda Fabia S2000, co-driven by regular wingman Stephane Prevot and the pair were crowned 2012 FIA Asia-Pacific Rally Champions.

In 2014, Atkinson signed with FAW-VW Rally Team from China. He competed with a S2000 with two rallies. At the end of 2014, with the coming of FAW-FW Golf 7 SCRC, Atkinson restarted his prominence in CRC (China Rally Championship). In the debut of the Golf 7 SCRC, Atko won by 25 mins in the penultimate rally of 2014 CRC in Longyou. And in the Wuyi, the last one, he did not give the champion away. For 2015 and 2016, Atko won 9 of 11 in CRC, defeating the Subaru Rally Team China driver Mark Higgins. However, CRC does not count the points achieved by a foreign driver, or he would surely be the Driver's Champion of CRC in 2015 and 2016.

2015: Guiyang (1st), Zhangye (Ret, Mark Higgins won), Beijing (1st), Dengfeng (1st), Longyou (1st), Wuyi (1st), Jixi (3rd, Jari Ketomaa won)

2016: Dengfeng (1st), Zhangye (1st), Jinzhong (1st), Changchun (1st)

== Other racing ==
At the 24 Hours Nürburgring in 2006, Atkinson made his circuit racing debut driving a Subaru Impreza for the Autosportif Racing UK placing second in class. From that lead a drive in the 2007 Bathurst 12 Hour again in a Subaru Impreza where he finished first in class and second outright. In 2009, he competed in the third round of the Australian Mini Challenge co-driving with two-time Fujitsu V8 Supercar Series Champion Steve Owen finishing second in the 30-minute endurance race.

Atkinson competed in the final four rounds of the 2016 Global RallyCross Championship, finishing the championship in 11th in a campaign that included a finals appearance in Seattle. He is likely to stay in rallycross for 2017, whether it be in the GRC or the World Rallycross Championship.

== Complete WRC results ==
Year	Entrant	Car	1	2	3	4	5	6	7	8	9	10	11	12	13	14	15	16	WDC	Points
2004	Chris Atkinson	Subaru Impreza WRX STI	MON	SWE	MEX	NZL; Ret	CYP	GRE	TUR	ARG	FIN; 33	GER		GBR	ITA	FRA	ESP	AUS; 5	16th	4
2004	Chris Atkinson	Suzuki Ignis S1600											JPN; 12						16th	4
2005	Subaru World Rally Team	Subaru Impreza WRC2004	MON	SWE; 19															12th	13
2005	Subaru World Rally Team	Subaru Impreza WRC2005			MEX; Ret	NZL; 7	ITA; 18	CYP; 10	TUR; 24	GRE; Ret	ARG; 9	FIN; Ret	GER; 11	GBR; 38	JPN; 3	FRA; Ret	ESP; 9	AUS; 4	12th	13
2006	Subaru Rally Team Australia	Subaru Impreza WRC2005	MON; 6			ESP; 11	FRA; 13				GER; 8								10th	20
2006	Subaru World Rally Team	Subaru Impreza WRC2006		SWE; 11	MEX; 7			ARG; 6	ITA; 10	GRE; 11		FIN; 13	JPN; 4	CYP; 9	TUR; 6	AUS; 9	NZL; Ret	GBR; 6	10th	20
2007	Subaru World Rally Team	Subaru Impreza WRC2006	MON; 4	SWE; 8	NOR; 19														7th	31
2007	Subaru World Rally Team	Subaru Impreza WRC2007				MEX; 5	POR; Ret	ARG; 7	ITA; 10	GRE; 6	FIN; 4	GER; 15	NZL; 4	ESP; 8	FRA; 6	JPN; Ret	IRE; 42	GBR; 7	7th	31
2008	Subaru World Rally Team	Subaru Impreza WRC2007	MON; 3	SWE; 21	MEX; 2	ARG; 2	JOR; 3	ITA; 6											5th	50
2008	Subaru World Rally Team	Subaru Impreza WRC2008							GRE; Ret	TUR; 13	FIN; 3	GER; 6	NZL; Ret	ESP; 7	FRA; 6	JPN; 4	GBR; Ret		5th	50
2009	Citroën Junior Team	Citroën C4 WRC	IRE; 5	NOR	CYP	POR	ARG	ITA	GRE	POL	FIN	AUS	ESP	GBR					14th	4
2012	Monster World Rally Team	Ford Fiesta RS WRC	MON	SWE	MEX; Ret	POR	ARG	GRE	NZL										13th	28
2012	Qatar World Rally Team	Citroën DS3 WRC								FIN; 39									13th	28
2012	WRC Team Mini Portugal	Mini John Cooper Works WRC									GER; 5	GBR; 11	FRA; 8	ITA; 6	ESP; 7				13th	28
2013	Abu Dhabi Citroën Total WRT	Citroën DS3 WRC	MON	SWE	MEX; 6	POR	ARG	GRE	ITA	FIN	GER	AUS	FRA	ESP	GBR				16th	8
2014	Hyundai Shell World Rally Team	Hyundai i20 WRC	MON	SWE	MEX; 7	POR	ARG	ITA	POL	FIN	GER	AUS; 10	FRA	ESP	GBR				18th	7

=== APRC results ===
Year	Entrant	Car	1	2	3	4	5	6	7	APRC	Points
2003	Suzuki Sport	Suzuki Ignis S1600	AUS; 4	NZL; Ret	JPN; 3	THA; 5	IND; 6			5th	18
2004	Monster Sport Australia	Suzuki Ignis S1600	AUS; 4	NCL; 3	NZL; 6	JPN; 2	CHI; Ret	IND		5th	27
2010	Proton R3 Malaysia	Proton Satria Neo S2000	MAL; 4	JPN; Ret	NZL; Ret	AUS; Ret	NCL	IDN	CHN; 2	5th	48
2011	Proton Motorsport	Proton Satria Neo S2000	MAL; 1	AUS; Ret	NCL; 1	NZL; 1	JPN; Ret	CHN; 2		2nd	139
2012	MRF Tyres	Škoda Fabia S2000	NZL; 1	NCL; 2	AUS; 1	MYS; 2	JPN	CHN; 2		1st	154

=== Complete Global Rallycross Championship results ===
(key)

==== Supercar ====
Year	Entrant	Car	1	2	3	4	5	6	7	8	9	10	11	12	GRC	Points
2016	Subaru Rally Team USA	Subaru Impreza WRX STi	PHO1	PHO2	DAL	DAY1	DAY2	MCAS1	MCAS2; C	DC	AC; 11	SEA; 6	LA1; 7	LA2; 7	11th	88
2017	Subaru Rally Team USA	Subaru Impreza WRX STI	MEM; 9	LOU	THO1; 7	THO2; 3	OTT1; 4	OTT2; 9	INDY; 8	AC1; 9	AC2; 4	SEA1; 3	SEA2; 5	LA; 9	7th	585

=== Supercar ===
Year	Entrant	Car	1	2	3	4	5	6	Rank	Points
2018	Subaru Rally Team USA	Subaru Impreza WRX STi	GBR; 8	COTA1; 6	CAN; 5	COTA2; 7			5th	66
2019	Subaru Rally Team USA	Subaru Impreza WRX STi	MO1; 6	GTW1; 1	GTW1; 4	CAN; 4	COTA; 5	MO2; 1	2nd	131

== Career highlights ==
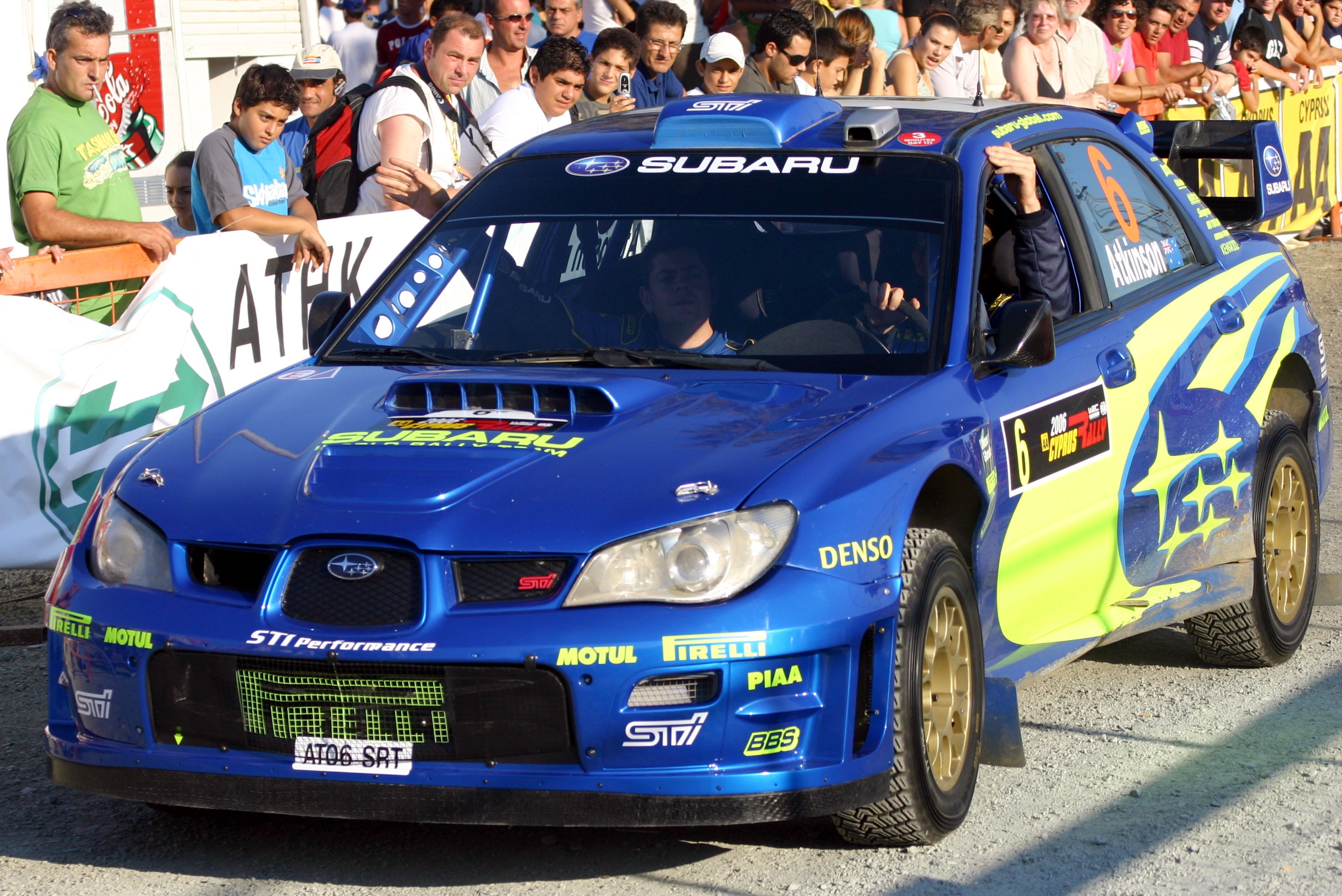
Atkinson and co-driver Glenn MacNeall in their Subaru Impreza WRC2006 during the 2006 Cyprus Rally.

- 2012 – Winner, Asia-Pacific Rally Championship
- 2011 – 2nd, Asia-Pacific Rally Championship
- 2010 – 5th, Asia-Pacific Rally Championship
- 2009 – 14th, World Rally Championship
- 2008 – 5th, World Rally Championship
- 2007 – 7th, World Rally Championship
- 2006 – 10th, World Rally Championship
- 2005 – 12th, World Rally Championship
- 2004 – Winner, Asia-Pacific Super 1600 Championship
- 2004 – Second, Australian Rally Championship
- 2003 – Winner, Asia-Pacific Super 1600 Championship
- 2002 – Winner, Australian Privateers Cup

Sporting positions
Preceded by Alister McRae	Asia-Pacific Rally Champion; 2012	Succeeded by Gaurav Gill
