= Austin Dyne =

American racing driver (born 1992)

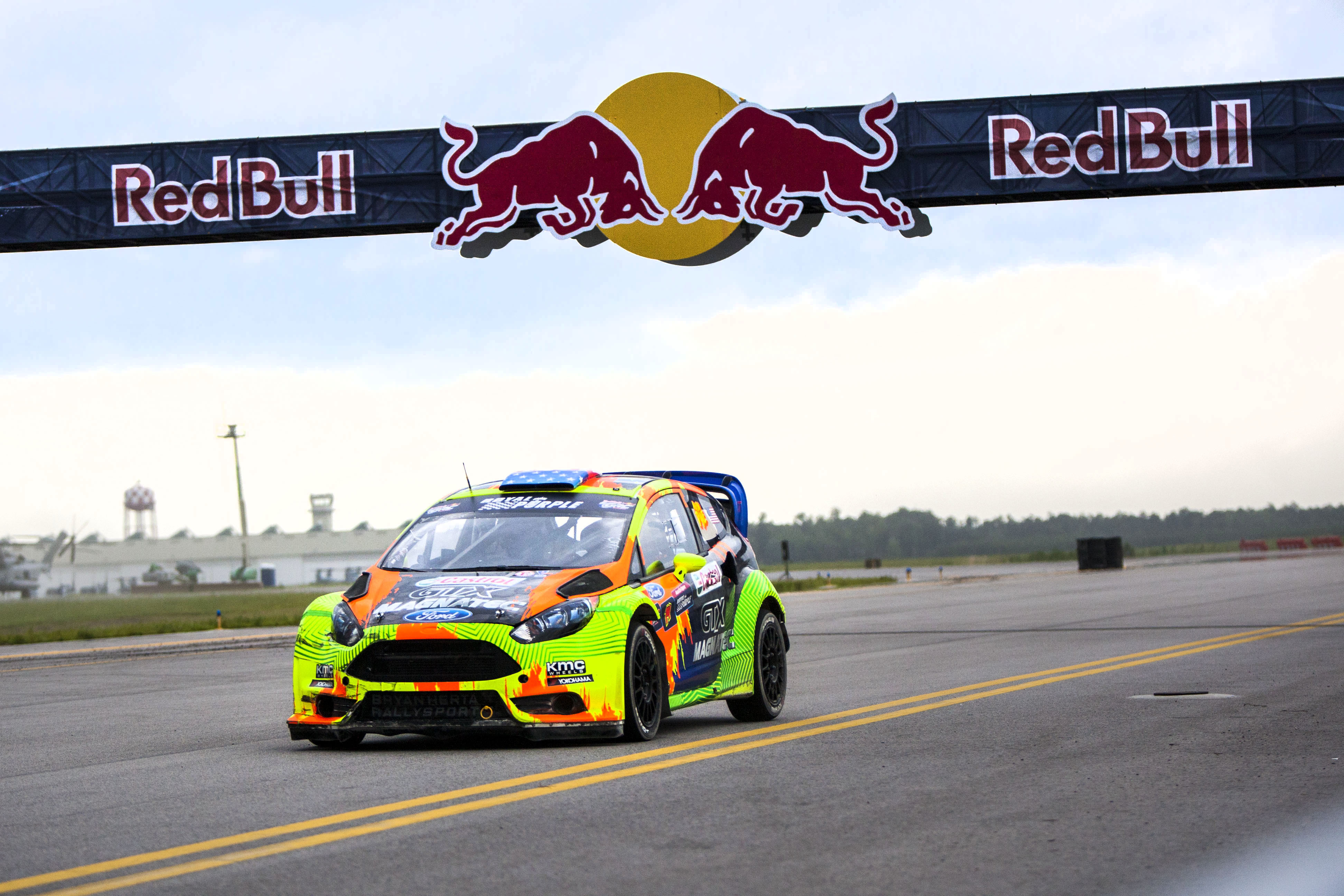
- Dyne racing at MCAS New River in 2015
- Born: February 20, 1992 (age 34); Malibu, California, U.S.

ARCA Menards Series East career
- 14 races run over 1 year
- Best finish: 15th (2013)
- First race: 2013 DRIVE4COPD 125 (Bristol)
- Last race: 2013 Road Atlanta 115 (Road Atlanta)
Wins	Top tens	Poles
0	3	0

ARCA Menards Series West career
- 14 races run over 1 year
- Best finish: 8th (2012)
- First race: 2012 Toyota / NAPA 150 Pres. by Gene Price Mspts. (Havasu)
- Last race: 2012 Casino Arizona 50 (Phoenix)
Wins	Top tens	Poles
0	7	0
- Statistics up to date as of November 14, 2024.

Austin Dyne (born February 20, 1992) is an American professional auto racing driver who competed in the NASCAR K&N Pro Series East, the NASCAR K&N Pro Series West, and the Global Rallycross Championship.

Dyne also previously competed in the Langers Juice S-2 Sportsman Series and the World Series of Asphalt Stock Car Racing. He also participated in the X Games in 2014.

== Motorsports results ==
=== NASCAR ===
(key) (Bold - Pole position awarded by qualifying time. Italics - Pole position earned by points standings or practice time. * – Most laps led.)

==== K&N Pro Series East ====
NASCAR K&N Pro Series East results
Year	Team	No.	Make	1	2	3	4	5	6	7	8	9	10	11	12	13	14	NKNPSEC	Pts	Ref
2013	Turner Scott Motorsports	99	Chevy	BRI; 23	GRE; 12	FIF; 20	RCH; 12	BGS; 18	IOW; 19	LGY; 8	COL; 23	IOW; 21	VIR; 13	GRE; 17	NHA; 29	DOV; 9	RAL; 10	15th	382	

==== K&N Pro Series West ====
NASCAR K&N Pro Series West results
Year	Team	No.	Make	1	2	3	4	5	6	7	8	9	10	11	12	13	14	15	NKNPSWC	Pts	Ref
2012	Sunrise Ford Racing	9	Ford	PHO	LHC; 7	MMP; 3	S99; 8		BIR; 8	LVS; 7	SON; 13	EVG; 13	CNS; 12		PIR; 10	SMP; 5	AAS; 12	PHO; 13	8th	487	
2012	Sunrise Ford Racing	91	Ford					IOW; 8						IOW; 12					8th	487	

=== Complete Global RallyCross Championship results ===
==== Supercar ====
Year	Entrant	Car	1	2	3	4	5	6	7	8	9	10	11	12	GRC	Points
2015	Bryan Herta Rallysport	Ford Fiesta ST	FTA; 6	DAY1; 2	DAY2; 7	MCAS; 4	DET1; 6	DET2; 6	DC; 8	LA1; DNS	LA2; 11	BAR1; 9	BAR2; 8	LV; 7	9th	277
2016	AD Racing	Ford Fiesta ST	PHO1; 10	PHO2; 7	DAL; 6	DAY1; 10	DAY2; 10	MCAS1; 5	MCAS2^{†}	DC; 8	AC; 7	SEA; 10	LA1; 12	LA2	8th	198
2017	Rahal Letterman Lanigan Racing	Ford Fiesta ST	MEM; DNS	LOU; 6	THO1; 5	THO2; 7	OTT1; 5	OTT2; 6	INDY; 5	AC1; 7	AC2; 8	SEA1; 6	SEA2; 6	LA; 8	9th	562

^{†} - Race cancelled.
