= Bushy Park Circuit =

Motorsport race track in St. Philip, Barbados

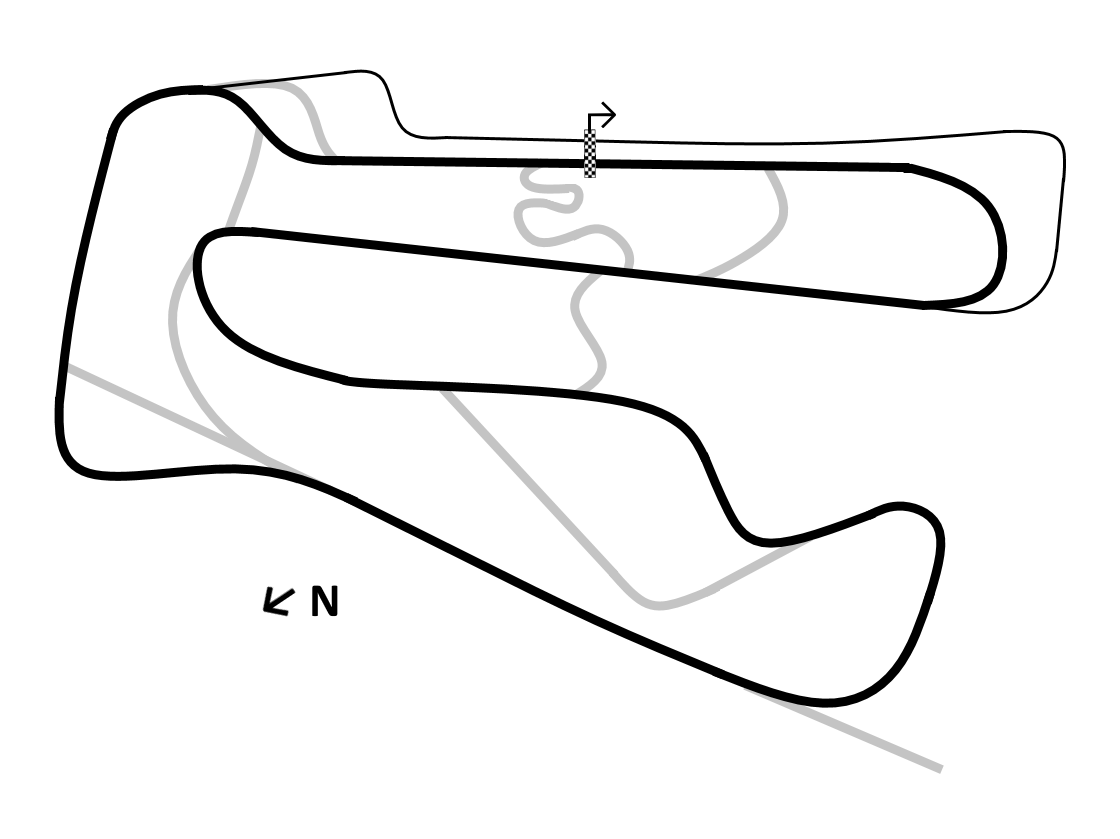
- Full Circuit (2014–present)
- Location: Gaskin, St. Philip, Barbados
- Coordinates: 13°08′N 59°28′W
- Owner: Mark Maloney
- Opened: 1971
- Major events: Global RallyCross Championship (2014–2015); Race of Champions (2014)

Full Circuit (2014–present)
- Surface: Asphalt
- Length: 2.012 km (1.250 mi)
- Turns: 11

National Circuit (2018–present)
- Surface: Asphalt
- Length: 1.280 km (0.795 mi)
- Turns: 9

Original Circuit (1970–2013)
- Surface: Asphalt
- Length: 1.300 km (0.808 mi)
- Turns: 9

Bushy Park Circuit is a motorsport race track in the parish of St. Philip, Barbados. The circuit features a 2.012 km (1.250 mi) FIA Grade 4 course and a 1.2 km (0.75 mi) CIK Grade 1 course.

== History ==
The original race track was built in 1971 by sugar cane plantation workers as a 1.300 km (0.808 mi) circuit. The circuit became a hub for racing in the Caribbean over the next three decades, however had fallen into disrepair by the mid-2000s. Local rally driver Ralph Williams coerced the FIA and Apex Circuit Design into supporting the circuit's redevelopment, a cause that was boosted by the large crowds witnessed at the local touring car event which delegates chose to attend. Reconstruction began in 2013 on what was grandly proposed as the central hub for racing in the Caribbean.

The track was refurbished and reopened in 2014 with the inaugural event being the Top Gear Festival featuring the Global RallyCross Championship. Later in the same year it hosted the 2014 Race of Champions. The Global RallyCross Championship returned in 2015 for a double-header event. Bushy Park has also since been used as a stage for Rally Barbados. Initially awarded a Grade Three license, a 2016 legal dispute that rendered the track unusable for 18 months would see the FIA downgrade the circuit to a Grade Four licence.

The circuit is owned by property developer Mark Maloney, uncle of Formula E driver Zane Maloney.
