= 2017 Global RallyCross Championship =

The 2017 Red Bull Global RallyCross Championship was the seventh and final season of the Global RallyCross Championship. Scott Speed was the reigning Supercars champion for a second season and Cabot Bigham was the reigning GRC Lites champion. The schedule consisted of twelve rounds at eight different venues.

== Schedule ==
Round	Event	Location	Date
1	Red Bull Global RallyCross Memphis	Memphis International Raceway, Millington, Tennessee	29 April
2	Red Bull Global RallyCross Louisville	Kentucky Exposition Center, Louisville, Kentucky	21 May
3	Red Bull Global RallyCross New England	Thompson Speedway Motorsports Park, Thompson, Connecticut	3–4 June
4	Red Bull Global RallyCross New England	Thompson Speedway Motorsports Park, Thompson, Connecticut	3–4 June
5	Red Bull Global RallyCross Ottawa	Canada Aviation and Space Museum, Ottawa, Ontario, Canada	17–18 June
6	Red Bull Global RallyCross Ottawa	Canada Aviation and Space Museum, Ottawa, Ontario, Canada	17–18 June
7	Red Bull Global RallyCross Indianapolis	Lucas Oil Raceway, Brownsburg, Indiana	9 July
8	Red Bull Global RallyCross Atlantic City	Bader Field, Atlantic City, New Jersey	12–13 August
9	Red Bull Global RallyCross Atlantic City	Bader Field, Atlantic City, New Jersey	12–13 August
10	Red Bull Global RallyCross Seattle	Evergreen Speedway, Monroe, Washington	9–10 September
11	Red Bull Global RallyCross Seattle	Evergreen Speedway, Monroe, Washington	9–10 September
12	Red Bull Global RallyCross Los Angeles	Port of Los Angeles, Los Angeles, California	14 October

== Entry list ==
=== Supercars ===
Manufacturer	Team	Car	No.	Drivers	Rounds
(United States) Ford	(United States) Loenbro Motorsports	Ford Fiesta ST	00	(Canada) Steve Arpin	All
(United States) Ford	(United States) Bryan Herta Rallysport	Ford Fiesta ST	2	(United States) Cabot Bigham (R)	1–9, 12
(United States) Ford	(United States) Bryan Herta Rallysport	Ford Fiesta ST	19	(United States) Austin Cindric (R)	10–11
(United States) Ford	(United States) Rahal Letterman Lanigan Racing	Ford Fiesta ST	14	(United States) Austin Dyne	All
(Japan) Honda	(Sweden) Honda Red Bull OMSE	Honda Civic Coupe	16	(Sweden) Oliver Eriksson (R)	All
(Japan) Honda	(Sweden) Honda Red Bull OMSE	Honda Civic Coupe	24	(United States) Mitchell DeJong	All
(Japan) Honda	(Sweden) Honda Red Bull OMSE	Honda Civic Coupe	93	(Sweden) Sebastian Eriksson	All
(Japan) Subaru	(United States) Subaru Rally Team USA	Subaru Impreza WRX STi	18	(Sweden) Patrik Sandell	All
(Japan) Subaru	(United States) Subaru Rally Team USA	Subaru Impreza WRX STi	55	(Australia) Chris Atkinson	All
(Germany) Volkswagen	(United States) Volkswagen Andretti Rallycross	Volkswagen Beetle	34	(United States) Tanner Foust	All
(Germany) Volkswagen	(United States) Volkswagen Andretti Rallycross	Volkswagen Beetle	41	(United States) Scott Speed	All

=== GRC Lites ===
Every driver competes in an Olsbergs MSE-built GRC Lites car.

Team	No.	Drivers	Rounds
(United States) Dreyer & Reinbold Racing	3	(United States) Travis PeCoy	All
(United States) Dreyer & Reinbold Racing	24	(United States) Alex Keyes	All
(United States) Dreyer & Reinbold Racing	44	(United States) Christian Brooks	All
(Colombia) AF Racing	4	(Colombia) Gustavo Yacamán	2
(Colombia) AF Racing	5	(United States) Burt Jenner	1
(Colombia) AF Racing	42	(New Zealand) Matt Halliday	7
(Colombia) AF Racing	126	(Colombia) Alejandro Fernández	1–6, 8–12
(Sweden) Olsbergs MSE X Forces	13	(France) Cyril Raymond	All
(Sweden) Olsbergs MSE X Forces	53	(United States) Cole Keatts	All
(Sweden) Olsbergs MSE X Forces	77	(United States) Scott Anderson	8–12
(Sweden) Olsbergs MSE X Forces	242	(United States) Mark Brummond	10–12
(United States) DirtFish Motorsports	21	(United States) Conner Martell	1–10, 12
(United States) DirtFish Motorsports	25	(United States) James Rimmer	All
(United States) CORE Autosport	54	(United States) Jon Bennett	1–6, 8–9
(United States) CORE Autosport	56	(United States) Colin Braun	1–6, 8–9

== Results and standings ==
=== Race results ===
No.	Event	3rd Place	2nd Place	GRC Lites Winner	Winner	Winning team	Manufacturer
1	Red Bull Global RallyCross Memphis	(Canada) Steve Arpin	(United States) Tanner Foust	(United States) Conner Martell	(United States) Scott Speed	(United States) Volkswagen Andretti Rallycross	(Germany) Volkswagen
2	Red Bull Global RallyCross Louisville	(United States) Scott Speed	(Canada) Steve Arpin	(United States) Christian Brooks	(Sweden) Sebastian Eriksson	(Sweden) Red Bull Honda OMSE	(Japan) Honda
3	Red Bull Global RallyCross New England	(United States) Mitchell DeJong	(United States) Scott Speed	(France) Cyril Raymond	(United States) Tanner Foust	(United States) Volkswagen Andretti Rallycross	(Germany) Volkswagen
4	Red Bull Global RallyCross New England	(Australia) Chris Atkinson	(United States) Scott Speed	(France) Cyril Raymond	(Canada) Steve Arpin	(United States) Loenbro Motorsports	(United States) Ford
5	Red Bull Global RallyCross Ottawa	(United States) Tanner Foust	(United States) Mitchell DeJong	(France) Cyril Raymond	(Canada) Steve Arpin	(United States) Loenbro Motorsports	(United States) Ford
6	Red Bull Global RallyCross Ottawa	(United States) Mitchell DeJong	(United States) Scott Speed	(France) Cyril Raymond	(United States) Tanner Foust	(United States) Volkswagen Andretti Rallycross	(Germany) Volkswagen
7	Red Bull Global RallyCross Indianapolis	(Canada) Steve Arpin	(United States) Tanner Foust	(United States) Christian Brooks	(United States) Scott Speed	(United States) Volkswagen Andretti Rallycross	(Germany) Volkswagen
8	Red Bull Global RallyCross Atlantic City	(Canada) Steve Arpin	(Sweden) Patrik Sandell	(France) Cyril Raymond	(United States) Scott Speed	(United States) Volkswagen Andretti Rallycross	(Germany) Volkswagen
9	Red Bull Global RallyCross Atlantic City	(Canada) Steve Arpin	(Sweden) Sebastian Eriksson	(United States) Conner Martell	(United States) Scott Speed	(United States) Volkswagen Andretti Rallycross	(Germany) Volkswagen
10	Red Bull Global RallyCross Seattle	(Australia) Chris Atkinson	(United States) Scott Speed	(France) Cyril Raymond	(United States) Tanner Foust	(United States) Volkswagen Andretti Rallycross	(Germany) Volkswagen
11	Red Bull Global RallyCross Seattle	(Sweden) Patrik Sandell	(United States) Scott Speed	(United States) Christian Brooks	(United States) Tanner Foust	(United States) Volkswagen Andretti Rallycross	(Germany) Volkswagen
12	Red Bull Global RallyCross Los Angeles	(Sweden) Patrik Sandell	(United States) Scott Speed	(United States) Conner Martell	(United States) Tanner Foust	(United States) Volkswagen Andretti Rallycross	(Germany) Volkswagen

=== Drivers' championships ===
Scoring system

Points were awarded based on finishing positions as shown in the chart below:

Position	**1st**	**2nd**	**3rd**	**4th**	**5th**	**6th**	**7th**	**8th**	**9th**	**10th**	**Others**
Points	50	45	40	35	30	25	20	15	10	5	0

In addition, points were awarded in all rounds of heats and semifinals. Heat winners earned seven points and semi winners earned ten points.

==== Supercars ====
Pos.	Driver	Team	MEM	LOU	NE1	NE2	OTT1	OTT2	IND	AC1	AC2	SEA1	SEA2	LA	Pts.
1	(United States) Scott Speed	(United States) Volkswagen Andretti Rallycross	**1**^{2 A}	3^{2 A}	2^{1 B}	2^{1}	DNS^{2}	**2**^{3 A}	**1**^{3 A}	**1**^{1 B}	**1**^{3 A}	2^{1}	2^{2 A}	2^{B}	826
2	(United States) Tanner Foust	(United States) Volkswagen Andretti Rallycross	2^{1 B}	**4**^{2 B}	**1**^{3 A}	**9**^{2 A}	**2**^{1 A}	1^{1 B}	2^{1 B}	10^{A}	9	1^{3 A}	1^{1}	**1**^{3 A}	807
3	(United States) Mitchell DeJong	(Sweden) Red Bull Honda OMSE	3^{1}	2^{1}	4^{1}	1^{B}	1^{B}	10^{1}	3	3^{2}	3	4	7	5^{1}	743
4	(Canada) Steve Arpin	(United States) Loenbro Motorsports	7^{1}	1	10	6	6	4^{1}	6	4	2^{1 B}	10	9	7	651
5	(Sweden) Sebastian Eriksson	(Sweden) Red Bull Honda OMSE	4	5	3	4	3	3	DNS	5	5^{1}	9	8	6	640
6	(Sweden) Oliver Eriksson **(R)**	(Sweden) Red Bull Honda OMSE	5	7	9^{1}	8^{1}	8^{1}	5	4	6	7	5^{1}	10	10	601
7	(Australia) Chris Atkinson	(United States) Subaru Rally Team USA	8^{1}	DNS	7	3	4^{1}	9	8^{1}	9	4^{1}	**3**^{1 B}	5	9	585
8	(Sweden) Patrik Sandell	(United States) Subaru Rally Team USA	9	DNS	6	5	9	7	7	2	10	7	**3**^{B}	3^{1}	582
9	(United States) Austin Dyne	(United States) Rahal Letterman Lanigan Racing	DNS	6^{1}	5	7	5	6	5	7	8	6	6	8^{1}	562
10	(United States) Cabot Bigham **(R)**	(United States) Bryan Herta Rallysport	6	8	8	10	7^{1}	8	9^{1}	8^{1}	6			4	473
11	(United States) Austin Cindric **(R)**	(United States) Bryan Herta Rallysport										8	4		102

Colour	Result
Gold	Winner
Silver	Second place
Bronze	Third place
Green	Points classification
Blue	Non-points classification
Blue	Non-classified finish (NC)
Purple	Retired, not classified (Ret)
Red	Did not qualify (DNQ)
Red	Did not pre-qualify (DNPQ)
Black	Disqualified (DSQ)
White	Did not start (DNS)
White	Withdrew (WD)
White	Race cancelled (C)
Blank	Did not practice (DNP)
Blank	Did not arrive (DNA)
Blank	Excluded (EX)

**Bold** – Fastest time in qualifying
^{1 2} – Number of heat wins
^{A B} – Winner of Semifinal A or B
^{LCQ} – Winner of the Last Chance Qualifier

==== GRC Lites ====
Pos.	Driver	Team	MEM	LOU	NE1	NE2	OTT1	OTT2	IND	AC1	AC2	SEA1	SEA2	LA	Pts.
1	(France) Cyril Raymond	(Sweden) Olsbergs MSE X Forces	2^{2}	9^{1}	**1**^{2 A}	1^{2 A}	**1**^{2 A}	**1**^{A}	2^{2}	**1**^{2}	6^{2 A}	**1**^{1 B}	**2**^{1 B}	9^{1 B}	786
2	(United States) Christian Brooks	(United States) Dreyer & Reinbold Racing	3^{1}	1^{1 A}	2^{1}	3	9^{B}	10	1^{B}	8	2	2^{2}	1	3	692
3	(United States) Travis PeCoy	(United States) Dreyer & Reinbold Racing	8	8^{1}	3^{1}	5	4	2	3	4^{B}	3	3^{A}	7^{1}	4^{1}	672
4	(United States) Conner Martell	(United States) DirtFish Motorsports	1^{1 B}	2^{1 B}	10	4^{1}	3	5^{1}	6^{1 A}	2^{1 A}	1^{B}	8		**1**^{2 A}	656
5	(United States) Alex Keyes	(United States) Dreyer & Reinbold Racing	**9**^{A}	10	5^{B}	**6**	8^{1}	3^{1 B}	**DSQ**	3^{1}	5^{1}	6^{1}	3	2	603
6	(United States) James Rimmer	(United States) DirtFish Motorsports	5	6^{LCQ}	7	7	7	4	5	5	DNQ	5	8^{2 A}	8	562
7	(United States) Cole Keatts	(Sweden) Olsbergs MSE X Forces	DNQ^{1}	7	6	9^{1 B}	6	6	4^{1}	10^{1}	10	4	6	7	543
8	(Colombia) Alejandro Fernández	(Colombia) AF Racing	6	DNQ	9	10	5	7^{1}		7	**8**	9	4	10	458
9	(United States) Colin Braun	(United States) CORE Autosport	4^{1}	4^{1}	4	2	2^{1}	8^{1}		DNQ^{1}	4^{1}				405
10	(United States) Jon Bennett	(United States) CORE Autosport	7	5^{1}	8	8	DNS	9		9	9^{LCQ}				281
11	(United States) Scott Anderson	(Sweden) Olsbergs MSE X Forces								6^{LCQ}	7	7	5	5	242
12	(United States) Mark Brummond	(Sweden) Olsbergs MSE X Forces										DSQ	9	6	79
13	(Colombia) Gustavo Yacamán	(Colombia) AF Racing		**3**											60
14	(New Zealand) Matt Halliday	(Colombia) AF Racing							7						45
15	(United States) Burt Jenner	(Colombia) AF Racing	10^{LCQ}												16

=== Manufacturers' championship ===
Pos.	Manufacturer	Pts.
1	(Germany) Volkswagen	
2	(United States) Ford	
3	(Japan) Honda	
4	(Japan) Subaru	
