= Blake Williams =

Australian motorsports competitor (born 1985)

Personal information
- Nickname: Bilko
- Nationality: Australian
- Born: 4 April 1985 (age 40) Baxter, Victoria, Australia

Sport
- Sport: Motocross, supercross, freestyle motocross
- Event(s): X Games, Dew Tour, Crusty Demons, Nitro Circus Live

Blake "Bilko" Williams (born 4 April 1985, in Baxter, Victoria, Australia) is a motorsports competitor who has won championships and X Games medals in several events, including motocross and freestyle motocross. He was awarded the FMX rider of the year in 2009.

== Racing record ==
=== Global RallyCross championship results ===
==== GRC Lites ====
Year	Entrant	Car	1	2	3	4	5	6	7	8	9	10	11	12	Position	Points
2015	Rhys Millen Racing	Lites Ford Fiesta	FTA	DAY1	DAY2	MCAS	DET1	DET2	DC	LA1	LA2	BAR1; 7	BAR2; 9	LV; 7	12th	55
2016	Rhys Millen Racing	Lites Ford Fiesta	PHO1	PHO2	DAL	DAY1; 14	DAY2; 13	MCAS1; 2	MCAS2^{†}	DC	AC	SEA	LA1; 9	LA2; DSQ	14th	75

^{†}Race cancelled.

Blake Williams also competed in the One Lap of America race with Travis Pastrana in a 2018 Subaru WRX STi, in the Mid-Priced Sedan & Stock Touring category. They placed 26th Overall, 2nd in Mid-Priced Sedan & 1st in Stock Touring.
