= Mitchell deJong =

American car racer (born 1997)

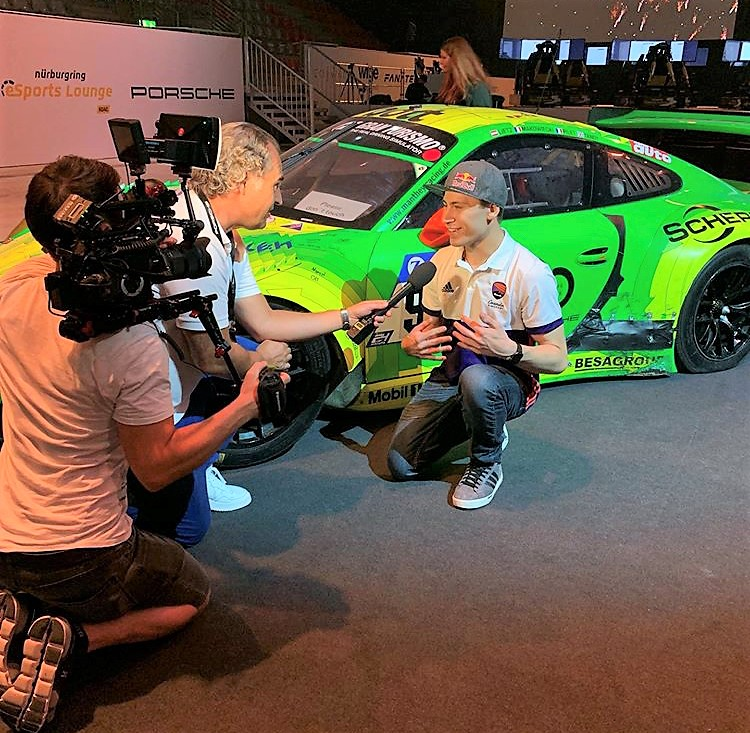
- deJong in 2020
- Born: September 15, 1997 (age 29) Laguna Hills, California, US

Team history
- 2015–2026: Coanda Esports
- 2021–2022: 23XI Racing (Note: deJong joined 23XI Racing for the 2021 and 2022 eNASCAR Coca-Cola iRacing Series seasons while continuing to race for Coanda Esports in road racing.)

Career highlights and awards
- 1× iRacing Rallycross World Championship (2018)
Medal record
Summer X Games
Representing United States
Gold medal – first place	Austin 2014	Rallycross Lites
Silver medal – second place	Los Angeles 2013	Rallycross Lites

Mitchell deJong (born September 15, 1997) is an American racing driver and esports driver who last drove for Bak40 Motorsports in Nitrocross.

== Early life ==
Mitchell deJong was born on September 15, 1997 in Laguna Hills, California. He began racing ATVs and go-karts at the age of five and began racing off-road trucks at the age of ten.

== Racing career ==
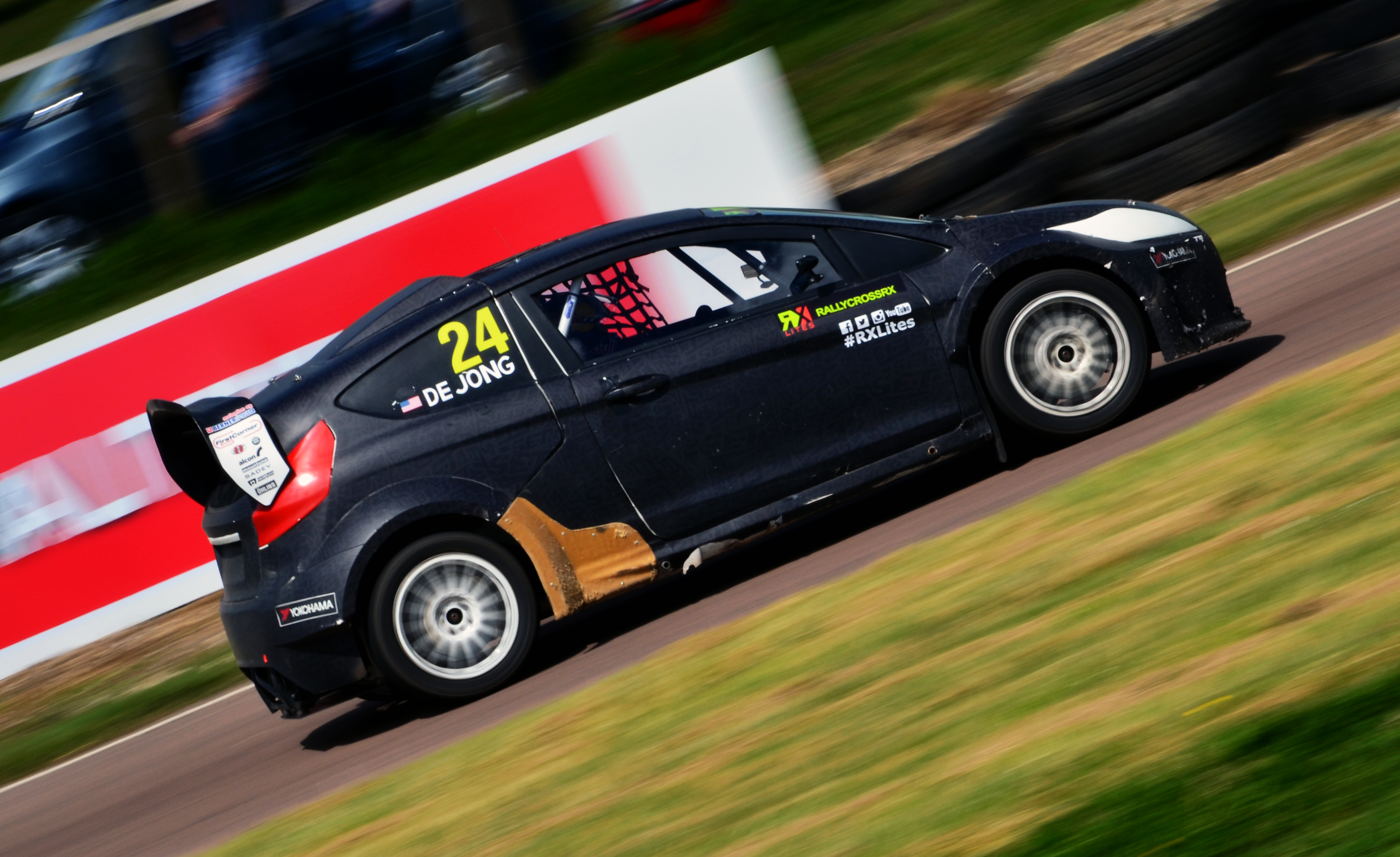
deJong at the 2014 World RX of Great Britain driving in the RX Lites class.

In 2012, deJong joined the Traxxas TORC Series and won the championship in the PRO Buggy class, winning six races.

DeJong won the silver medal for Rallycross Lites at X Games Los Angeles 2013. He won the gold medal a year later at X Games Austin 2014.

In 2014, deJong won seven of nine races en route to the GRC Lites championship.

== Esports career ==
DeJong won the iRacing Rallycross World Championship in 2018 and finished runner-up in the iRacing World Championship Grand Prix Series. In 2019, he finished second in the Rallycross championship.

In 2021, deJong qualified for the eNASCAR Coca-Cola iRacing Series. He won his first race at Circuit of the Americas and later at Road America to qualify for the playoffs. deJong reached the championship round and finished the season third overall.

DeJong won one race at Watkins Glen for the 2022 eNASCAR Coca-Cola iRacing Series season. He finished the season sixth overall.

== Racing record ==
=== Esports career summary ===
Season	Series	Team	Wins	Top 5	Poles	Laps Led	Points	Position
2014	iRacing World Championship Grand Prix Series	Orion Race Team	0	2	0	3	69	30th
2015	iRacing World Championship Grand Prix Series	Foracer Coanda Simsport	3	8	2	126	410	5th
2016	iRacing World Championship Grand Prix Series	VRS Coanda Simsport	0	8	3	55	319	30th
2017	iRacing World Championship Grand Prix Series	VRS Coanda Simsport	0	7	1	49	243	9th
2017	iRacing Blancpain GT Series	VRS Coanda Simsport	0	3	0		250	3rd
2018	iRacing World Championship Grand Prix Series	VRS Coanda Simsport	3	12	3	185	968	2nd
2018	iRacing Rallycross World Championship Series	VRS Coanda Simsport	5	9	5		766	1st
2018	VRS GT iRacing World Championship 2018	VRS Coanda Simsport	1	7	0		534	3rd
2019	Porsche TAG Heuer Esports Supercup	VRS Coanda Simsport	0	6	1	35	861	4th
2019	iRacing Rallycross World Championship Series	VRS Coanda Simsport	5	7	4	80	561	2nd
2019	VRS GT iRacing World Championship	VRS Coanda Simsport	0	6	1		440	2nd
2020	Subaru iRX All-Star Invitational	VRS Coanda Simsport					229	1st
2020	Porsche TAG Heuer Esports Supercup	VRS Coanda Simsport	0	2	1	7	251	11th
2020	iRacing Rallycross World Championship Series	Subaru Motorsports USA	1	5	2	41	150	4th
2021	Porsche TAG Heuer Esports Supercup	VRS Coanda Simsport	1	4	1	33	478	2nd
2021	eNASCAR Coca-Cola iRacing Series	23XI Racing	2	7	6	348	3032	3rd
2022	eNASCAR Coca-Cola iRacing Series	23XI Racing	1	4	1	84	2071	6th
2025	Porsche TAG Heuer Esports Supercup	Coanda Esports	0	2	0	0	275	9th
