= Global Rallycross =

Group of rallycross series

- Category: Rallycross
- Country: Worldwide
- Inaugural season: 2011
- Folded: 2017
- Classes: Supercar
- Last Drivers' champion: Scott Speed

Global Rallycross (known as Red Bull Global Rallycross for sponsorship reasons) was a rallycross series operated by businessmen Colin Dyne in conjunction with Sponsor RedBull. The series ran for seven seasons, primarily in North America, from 2011 to 2017.

== History ==
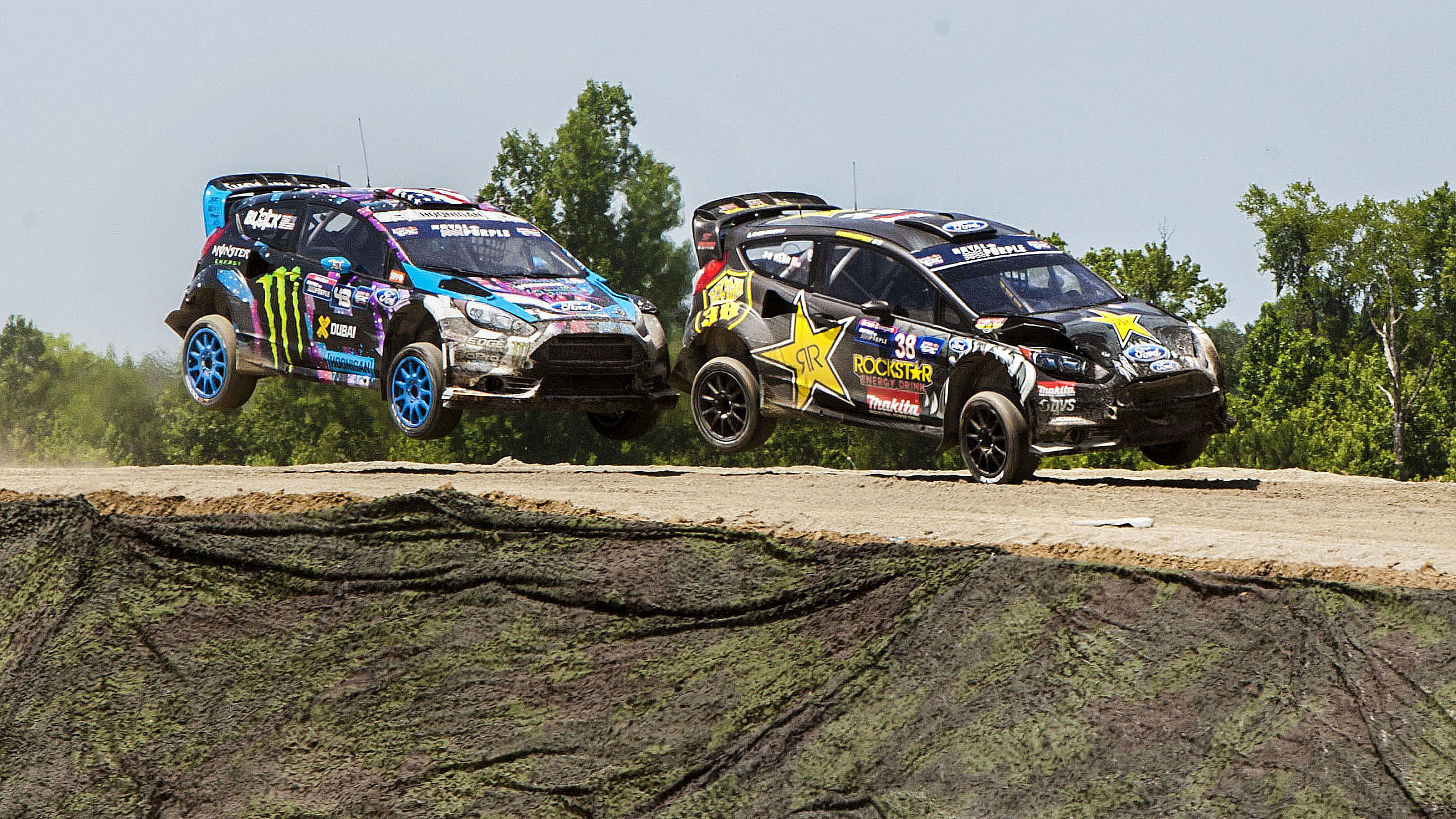
Ken Block (left) and Brian Deegan participating in a 2015 event at Marine Corps Air Station New River

Following Rallycross's inclusion in the 2010 Los Angeles X Games, three demonstration events were held in late 2010 at the New Jersey Motorsports Park, and Global Rallycross Management organized their first championship season of five events in 2011. Tanner Foust won the inaugural championship title in 2011. He retained the title again in 2012.

In addition to promoting the series, Global Rallycross Management managed invitations and competition for X Games Rallycross contests.

In 2013, the series held races outside the United States for the first time. Later in the season, it introduced the Lites division, a developmental series. Making its debut at New Hampshire Motor Speedway, Joni Wiman was the inaugural champion after winning all six races.

On October 28, 2016, the series announced the formation of an electric racing division.

In 2018 Global Rallycross ceased operations.

== Format ==
=== Qualifying ===
Qualifying was conducted over the course of one hour. The field was broken up into small groups that took to the track in 10-minute sessions. Seeding for heat races was determined by a driver's qualifying lap time.

=== Heats ===
A race weekend consisted of one or two rounds of heats that count for championship points, as well as a semifinal. The heats always consisted of three sessions of four or five cars each, while the semifinals consisted of two sessions of six or more cars each. In the case of an event with only one round of heats, such as a doubleheader race, points were awarded in the semifinal, but not otherwise.

The top three finishers in the semifinals transferred into the main event, giving their teams time to work on their cars while others continue to compete. All drivers who do not make it into the main event via the semifinals would compete in the last chance qualifier for the final four remaining qualifying spots. Ten cars then compete in the main event.

=== Start ===
Races began with a standing start, where drivers are given 30- and 10-second intervals before the green. During that time they must activate launch systems, including an anti-lag system, before starting the race. The fastest driver in the previous session was given the inside lane to the first corner.

=== Joker lap ===
Each course was equipped with two routes: the main route, and the joker lap route, which each driver must only take once per race. The GRC joker lap route typically shortened the length of the track significantly (while in the FIA World Rallycross Championship the JL detour is longer than the main route, to slow the cars down for a minimum of two seconds), so when a driver takes the joker lap can affect their race strategy. Depending on the venue, the joker lap route may have additional obstacles which significantly slow the cars thus making the main route faster. In mid season 2015, GRC made some changes to the joker lap, where drivers were not allowed to take the joker lap on the first lap.

=== Penalty box ===
The penalty box was a new addition to series for the 2013 season, and was designed to deal with on-track infractions without having to red flag or restart the race. In event of a jump start or unsportsmanlike driving, the penalised driver would pull into a 50-metre lane off track, where they would be held until a track official releases them. The penalty box was first used at the first event at X Games Brazil, when Nelson Piquet Jr. jump-started at the beginning of Heat 2.

=== Championship points ===
As of 2014, championship points were awarded only to drivers who had committed to running at least half of the season. Under that point system, one-off drivers were skipped over when points were awarded; for example, if the race winner was not eligible to earn points, the event runner-up would earn first place points. Points were awarded at the conclusion of the event to eligible finishers as follows:

Position	1st	2nd	3rd	4th	5th	6th	7th	8th	9th	10th	11th and below
Points	50	45	40	35	30	25	20	15	10	5	1

In addition, points were awarded in all rounds of heats and semifinals. First place earned five points, second place earned four points, and so on through fifth place and below, which earn one point. Only drivers who were disqualified from a heat or fail to pull to the starting grid did not receive points for their heats. On race weekends with three rounds of heats, the third round solely determined starting spots in the main event and did not award points.

At the end of the season, the driver to score the most points was crowned Global Rallycross champion. The top two cars per manufacturer also scored points in the manufacturer's championship.

== Champions ==
=== Supercar Class ===
Season	Driver Series			Championship for Manufacturers	
Season	Driver	Team	Car	Manufacturer	Car
2011	(United States) Tanner Foust	(Sweden) Olsbergs MSE Ford Racing	Ford Fiesta	not held	
2012	(United States) Tanner Foust	(Sweden) Olsbergs MSE Ford Racing	Ford Fiesta	not held	
2013	(Finland) Toomas Heikkinen	(Sweden) Olsbergs MSE Ford Racing	Ford Fiesta ST	(United States) Ford	Ford Fiesta ST
2014	(Finland) Joni Wiman	(Sweden) Olsbergs MSE Ford Racing	Ford Fiesta ST	(United States) Ford	Ford Fiesta ST
2015	(United States) Scott Speed	(United States) Volkswagen Andretti Rallycross	Volkswagen Beetle	(United States) Ford	Ford Fiesta ST
2016	(United States) Scott Speed	(United States) Volkswagen Andretti Rallycross	Volkswagen Beetle	(Germany) Volkswagen	Volkswagen Beetle
2017	(United States) Scott Speed	(United States) Volkswagen Andretti Rallycross	Volkswagen Beetle	(Germany) Volkswagen	Volkswagen Beetle

== See also ==
- FIA World Rallycross Championship
