= List of 2017 motorsport champions =

2017 motorsport champions
Previous: 2016	Next: 2018

This list of 2017 motorsport champions is a list of national or international motorsport series with championships decided by the points or positions earned by a driver from multiple races where the season was completed during the 2017 calendar year.

== Air racing ==
Series	Rider	refer
Red Bull Air Race World Championship	(Japan) Yoshihide Muroya	2017 Red Bull Air Race World Championship
Red Bull Air Race World Championship	Challenger: (Germany) Florian Bergér	2017 Red Bull Air Race World Championship

== Dirt oval racing ==
Series	Champion	refer
Lucas Oil Late Model Dirt Series	(United States) Josh Richards	
Oval Superstars Tour	(New Zealand) Christian Hermansen	Oval Superstars Tour
USAC Silver Crown Series	(United States) Kody Swanson	2017 USAC Silver Crown Series
World of Outlaws Late Model Series	(United States) Brandon Sheppard	
World of Outlaws Sprint Car Series	(United States) Donny Schatz	2017 World of Outlaws Craftsman Sprint Car Series
World of Outlaws Sprint Car Series	Teams: (United States) Tony Stewart Racing	2017 World of Outlaws Craftsman Sprint Car Series

== Drag racing ==
Series	Champion	Refer
NHRA Mello Yello Drag Racing Series	Top Fuel: (United States) Brittany Force	2017 NHRA Mello Yello Drag Racing Series
NHRA Mello Yello Drag Racing Series	Funny Car: (United States) Robert Hight	2017 NHRA Mello Yello Drag Racing Series
NHRA Mello Yello Drag Racing Series	Pro Stock: (United States) Bo Butner	2017 NHRA Mello Yello Drag Racing Series
NHRA Mello Yello Drag Racing Series	Pro Stock Motorcycle: (United States) Eddie Krawiec	2017 NHRA Mello Yello Drag Racing Series
European Drag Racing Championship	Top Fuel: (Malta) Duncan Micallef	
European Drag Racing Championship	Top Methanol: (Germany) Timo Habermann	
European Drag Racing Championship	Pro Stock Car: (Sweden) Bengt Ljungdahl	
European Drag Racing Championship	Pro Stock Modified: (Sweden) Michael Gullqvist	

== Drifting ==
Series	Rider	refer
FIA Intercontinental Drifting Cup	(Japan) Masato Kawabata	2017 FIA Intercontinental Drifting Cup
British Drift Championship	(United Kingdom) Matt Carter	2017 British Drift Championship
British Drift Championship	Pro-Am: (United Kingdom) Scott Cartledge	2017 British Drift Championship
D1 Grand Prix	(Japan) Hideyuki Fujino	2017 D1 Grand Prix series
D1NZ	(New Zealand) Cole Armstrong	2017 D1NZ season
D1NZ	Pro-Sport: (New Zealand) Bruce Tannock	2017 D1NZ season
Formula D	(Republic of Ireland) James Dean	2017 Formula D season
Formula D	PROSPEC: (United States) Kevin Lawrence	2017 Formula D season
Formula D	Manufacturers: (Japan) Toyota	2017 Formula D season
Formula D	Tire Cup: (Japan) Falken	2017 Formula D season
Drift Masters	(Poland) Adam Zalewski	2017 Drift Masters

== Karting ==
Series	Driver	Season article
CIK-FIA Karting World Championship	OK: (United Kingdom) Danny Keirle	
CIK-FIA Karting World Championship	OKJ: (United Kingdom) Dexter Patterson	
CIK-FIA Karting World Championship	KZ: (Italy) Paolo De Conto	
CIK-FIA Karting World Championship	KZ2: (Italy) Alex Irlando	
CIK-FIA Karting Academy Trophy	(Belgium) Xavier Handsaeme	2017 CIK-FIA Karting Academy Trophy
CIK-FIA Karting European Championship	OK: (Morocco) Sami Taoufik	
CIK-FIA Karting European Championship	OK-J: (United Kingdom) Jonny Edgar	
CIK-FIA Karting European Championship	KZ: (Italy) Paolo De Conto	
CIK-FIA Karting European Championship	KZ2: (Germany) Leon Köhler	
WSK Champions Cup	KZ2: (Netherlands) Stan Pex	
WSK Champions Cup	OK: (Spain) Pedro Hiltbrand	
WSK Champions Cup	OKJ: (Russia) Ilya Morozov	
WSK Champions Cup	60 Mini: (Italy) Alfio Spina	
Rotax Max Challenge	DD2: (Australia) Cody Gillis	
Rotax Max Challenge	DD2 Masters: (Australia) Troy Woolston	
Rotax Max Challenge	Senior: (United Kingdom) Brett Ward	
Rotax Max Challenge	Junior: (Netherlands) Tijmen van der Helm	
Rotax Max Challenge	Mini: (France) Marcus Amand	
Rotax Max Challenge	Micro: (France) Louis Iglésias	
Rotax Max Challenge	Nations Cup: Australia	

== Motorcycle racing ==
Series	Rider	refer
FIM MotoGP	(Spain) Marc Márquez	2017 MotoGP World Championship
FIM MotoGP	Teams: (Japan) Repsol Honda Team	2017 MotoGP World Championship
FIM MotoGP	Manufacturers: (Japan) Honda	2017 MotoGP World Championship
FIM Moto2	(Italy) Franco Morbidelli	2017 Moto2 World Championship
FIM Moto2	Manufacturers: (Germany) Kalex	2017 Moto2 World Championship
FIM Moto3	(Spain) Joan Mir	2017 Moto3 World Championship
FIM Moto3	Manufacturers: (Japan) Honda	2017 Moto3 World Championship
FIM CEV Moto3 Junior World Championship	(Italy) Dennis Foggia	2017 FIM CEV Moto3 Junior World Championship
FIM Endurance World Championship	(France) Mike Di Meglio (Spain) David Checa (Italy) Niccolò Canepa	2016-17 FIM Endurance World Championship
FIM Endurance World Championship	Manufacturers: (Japan) Yamaha	2016-17 FIM Endurance World Championship
British Superbike Championship	(United Kingdom) Shane Byrne	2017 British Superbike Championship
Superbike World Championship	(United Kingdom) Jonathan Rea	2017 Superbike World Championship
Superbike World Championship	Manufacturers: (Japan) Kawasaki	2017 Superbike World Championship
Supersport World Championship	(France) Lucas Mahias	2017 Supersport World Championship
Supersport World Championship	Teams: (Italy) GRT Yamaha Official WorldSSP Team	2017 Supersport World Championship
Supersport World Championship	Manufacturers: (Japan) Yamaha	2017 Supersport World Championship
Supersport 300 World Championship	(Spain) Marc García	2017 Supersport 300 World Championship
Supersport 300 World Championship	Manufacturers: (Japan) Yamaha	2017 Supersport 300 World Championship
Australian Superbike Championship	(Australia) Josh Waters	
European Talent Cup	(Spain) Manuel González	2017 European Talent Cup
New Zealand Superbike Championship	(New Zealand) Sloan Frost	2016-17 New Zealand Superbike Championship season
New Zealand Superbike Championship	Manufacturer: (Japan) Suzuki	2016-17 New Zealand Superbike Championship season
Red Bull MotoGP Rookies Cup	(Japan) Kazuki Masaki	2017 Red Bull MotoGP Rookies Cup

=== Dirt racing ===
Series	Rider	refer
FIM Motocross World Championship	(Italy) Tony Cairoli	2017 FIM Motocross World Championship
FIM Motocross World Championship	Manufacturers: (Austria) KTM	2017 FIM Motocross World Championship
FIM Motocross World Championship	MX2: (Latvia) Pauls Jonass	2017 FIM Motocross World Championship
FIM Motocross World Championship	MX2 Manufacturers: (Austria) KTM	2017 FIM Motocross World Championship
FIM Women's Motocross World Championship	(Italy) Kiara Fontanesi	2017 FIM Women's Motocross World Championship
FIM Women's Motocross World Championship	Manufacturers: (Japan) Yamaha	2017 FIM Women's Motocross World Championship
AMA National Motocross Championship	(United States) Eli Tomac	2017 AMA National Motocross Championship
AMA National Motocross Championship	250cc: (United States) Zach Osbourne	2017 AMA National Motocross Championship
British Motocross Championship	(United Kingdom) Graeme Irwin	2017 British Motocross Championship
British Motocross Championship	MX2: (United Kingdom) Ben Watson	2017 British Motocross Championship
European Motocross Championship	(Italy) Morgan Lesiardo	2017 European Motocross Championship
European Motocross Championship	Manufacturers: (Japan) Kawasaki	2017 European Motocross Championship
European Motocross Championship	EMX125: (France) Brian Strubhart-Moreau	2017 European Motocross Championship
European Motocross Championship	EMX125 Manufacturers: (Sweden) Husqvarna	2017 European Motocross Championship
European Motocross Championship	EMX300: (United Kingdom) Brad Anderson	2017 European Motocross Championship
European Motocross Championship	EMX300 Manufacturers: (Austria) KTM	2017 European Motocross Championship
European Motocross Championship	EMX150: (Italy) Andrea Adamo	2017 European Motocross Championship
European Motocross Championship	EMX65: (Denmark) Mads Fredsoe Sorensen	2017 European Motocross Championship

== Open wheel racing ==
Series	Champion	refer
FIA Formula One World Championship	(United Kingdom) Lewis Hamilton	2017 Formula One World Championship
FIA Formula One World Championship	Constructors: (Germany) Mercedes	2017 Formula One World Championship
FIA Formula 2 Championship	(Monaco) Charles Leclerc	2017 FIA Formula 2 Championship
FIA Formula 2 Championship	Teams: (Russia) Russian Time	2017 FIA Formula 2 Championship
GP3 Series	(United Kingdom) George Russell	2017 GP3 Series
GP3 Series	Teams: (France) ART Grand Prix	2017 GP3 Series
FIA Formula E	(Brazil) Lucas di Grassi	2016-17 Formula E season
FIA Formula E	Constructors: (France) Renault e.DAMS	2016-17 Formula E season
IndyCar Series	(United States) Josef Newgarden	2017 IndyCar Series
IndyCar Series	Manufacturers: (United States) Chevrolet	2017 IndyCar Series
IndyCar Series	Rookie: (United Arab Emirates) Ed Jones	2017 IndyCar Series
Atlantic Championship	(United States) Peter Portante	2017 Atlantic Championship
BOSS GP Series	(Austria) Ingo Gerstl	2017 BOSS GP Series
BOSS GP Series	Open Class: (India) Mahaveer Raghunathan	2017 BOSS GP Series
Formula Continental	(United States) Austin McCusker	2017 Formula Continental season
Formula Masters China	(New Zealand) Taylor Cockerton	2017 Formula Masters China
Formula STCC Nordic	(Sweden) Hugo Nerman	2017 Formula STCC Nordic
F2000 Italian Formula Trophy	(Italy) Riccardo Ponzio	2017 F2000 Italian Formula Trophy
F2000 Italian Formula Trophy	Teams: (Italy) Puresport	2017 F2000 Italian Formula Trophy
Indy Lights	(United States) Kyle Kaiser	2017 Indy Lights
Indy Lights	Teams: (United States) Belardi Auto Racing	2017 Indy Lights
FIA Masters Historic Formula One Championship	Fittipaldi/Stewart: (United Kingdom) Max Smith-Hilliard	2017 FIA Masters Historic Formula One Championship
FIA Masters Historic Formula One Championship	Head/Lauda: (United Kingdom) Michael Lyons	2017 FIA Masters Historic Formula One Championship
MRF Challenge Formula 2000	(United Kingdom) Harrison Newey	2016-17 MRF Challenge Formula 2000 Championship
New Zealand Formula First Championship	(New Zealand) Bramwell King	2016-17 New Zealand Formula First Championship
Pro Mazda Championship	(Brazil) Victor Franzoni	2017 Pro Mazda Championship
Pro Mazda Championship	Teams: (United States) Team Pelfrey	2017 Pro Mazda Championship
Super Formula Championship	(Japan) Hiroaki Ishiura	2017 Super Formula Championship
Super Formula Championship	Teams: (Japan) P.mu/cerumo・INGING	2017 Super Formula Championship
Toyota Racing Series	(Australia) Thomas Randle	2017 Toyota Racing Series
World Series Formula V8 3.5	(Brazil) Pietro Fittipaldi	2017 World Series Formula V8 3.5
World Series Formula V8 3.5	Teams: (Czech Republic) Lotus	2017 World Series Formula V8 3.5
Formula 3
FIA Formula 3 European Championship	(United Kingdom) Lando Norris	2017 FIA Formula 3 European Championship
FIA Formula 3 European Championship	Teams: (Italy) Prema Powerteam	2017 FIA Formula 3 European Championship
FIA Formula 3 European Championship	Rookies: (United Kingdom) Lando Norris	2017 FIA Formula 3 European Championship
All-Japan Formula Three Championship	(Japan) Mitsunori Takaboshi	2017 Japanese Formula 3 Championship
All-Japan Formula Three Championship	Teams: (Japan) B-Max Racing Team	2017 Japanese Formula 3 Championship
All-Japan Formula Three Championship	National: (Japan) 'Dragon'	2017 Japanese Formula 3 Championship
Australian Formula 3 Premier Series	(Australia) Calan Williams	2017 Australian Formula 3 Premier Series
Australian Formula 3 Premier Series	National: (Australia) Roman Krumins	2017 Australian Formula 3 Premier Series
Fórmula 3 Brasil	(Brazil) Guilherme Samaia	2017 Formula 3 Brasil season
Fórmula 3 Brasil	Teams: (Brazil) Cesário F3	2017 Formula 3 Brasil season
Fórmula 3 Brasil	Academy: (Brazil) Igor Fraga	2017 Formula 3 Brasil season
BRDC British Formula 3 Championship	(United Kingdom) Enaam Ahmed	2017 BRDC British Formula 3 Championship
Chilean Formula Three Championship	(Chile) José Luis Riffo	2017 Chilean Formula Three Championship
Euroformula Open Championship	(United Kingdom) Harrison Scott	2017 Euroformula Open Championship
Euroformula Open Championship	Teams: (Italy) RP Motorsport	2017 Euroformula Open Championship
Euroformula Open Championship	Rookies: (Russia) Nikita Troitskiy	2017 Euroformula Open Championship
Spanish Formula 3 Championship	(Canada) Devlin DeFrancesco	2017 Euroformula Open Championship
Spanish Formula 3 Championship	Teams: (Italy) RP Motorsport	2017 Euroformula Open Championship
MotorSport Vision Formula Three Cup	(Italy) Jacopo Sebastiani	2017 MotorSport Vision Formula Three Cup
MotorSport Vision Formula Three Cup	Teams: (United Kingdom) CF Racing	2017 MotorSport Vision Formula Three Cup
MotorSport Vision Formula Three Cup	Cup: (Italy) Jacopo Sebastiani	2017 MotorSport Vision Formula Three Cup
MotorSport Vision Formula Three Cup	Trophy: (United Kingdom) Adrian Holey	2017 MotorSport Vision Formula Three Cup
Remus F3 Cup	(Switzerland) Sandro Zeller	2017 Remus F3 Cup
Formula 4
ADAC Formula 4 Championship	(Estonia) Jüri Vips	2017 ADAC Formula 4 Championship
ADAC Formula 4 Championship	Teams: (Italy) Prema Powerteam	2017 ADAC Formula 4 Championship
ADAC Formula 4 Championship	Rookie: (Austria) Mick Wishofer	2017 ADAC Formula 4 Championship
Australian Formula 4 Championship	(Australia) Nick Rowe	2017 Australian Formula 4 Championship
F4 British Championship	(United Kingdom) Jamie Caroline	2017 F4 British Championship
China Formula 4 Championship	(Macau) Leong Hon Chio	2017 China Formula 4 Championship
F4 Danish Championship	(Denmark) Daniel Lundgaard	2017 F4 Danish Championship
Italian F4 Championship	(New Zealand) Marcus Armstrong	2017 Italian F4 Championship
Italian F4 Championship	Rookie: (Italy) Leonardo Lorandi	2017 Italian F4 Championship
Italian F4 Championship	Teams: (Italy) Bhaitech	2017 Italian F4 Championship
F4 Japanese Championship	(Japan) Ritomo Miyata	2017 F4 Japanese Championship
NACAM Formula 4 Championship	(Guyana) Calvin Ming	2016–17 NACAM Formula 4 Championship
SMP F4 Championship	(Denmark) Christian Lundgaard	2017 SMP F4 Championship
Formula 4 South East Asia Championship	(Indonesia) Presley Martono	2016-17 Formula 4 South East Asia Championship
Formula 4 South East Asia Championship	Rookie: (Indonesia) Presley Martono	2016-17 Formula 4 South East Asia Championship
F4 Spanish Championship	(Denmark) Christian Lundgaard	2017 F4 Spanish Championship
F4 Spanish Championship	Teams: (Netherlands) MP Motorsport	2017 F4 Spanish Championship
F4 Spanish Championship	F: (Spain) Marta García	2017 F4 Spanish Championship
Formula 4 UAE Championship	(South Africa) Jonathan Aberdein	2016–17 Formula 4 UAE Championship
Formula 4 United States Championship	(United States) Kyle Kirkwood	2017 Formula 4 United States Championship
Formula 4 United States Championship	Teams: (United States) Cape Motorsports	2017 Formula 4 United States Championship
Japan Formula 4	East: (Japan) Yuki Tsunoda	2017 Japan Formula 4
Japan Formula 4	West: (Japan) Keisuke Ohara	2017 Japan Formula 4
Formula Ford
Australian Formula Ford Series	(Australia) Max Vidau	2017 Australian Formula Ford Series
F1600 Championship Series	(United Kingdom) Matthew Cowley	2017 F1600 Championship Series
F2000 Championship Series	(United States) Brandon Dixon	2017 F2000 Championship Series
Pacific F2000 Championship	(United States) Mitch Egner	2017 Pacific F2000 Championship
New Zealand Formula Ford Championship	(New Zealand) Liam Lawson	2016-17 New Zealand Formula Ford Championship
South African Formula Ford Championship	(South Africa) Julian van der Watt	2017 South African Formula Ford Championship
South African Formula Ford Championship	Class-B: (South Africa) Ian Schofield	2017 South African Formula Ford Championship
Toyo Tires F1600 Championship Series	(Canada) Ben Hurst	2017 Toyo Tires F1600 Championship Series
U.S. F2000 National Championship	(United States) Oliver Askew	2017 U.S. F2000 National Championship
U.S. F2000 National Championship	Teams: (United States) Pabst Racing	2017 U.S. F2000 National Championship
Formula Renault
Eurocup Formula Renault 2.0	(France) Sacha Fenestraz	2017 Eurocup Formula Renault 2.0
Eurocup Formula Renault 2.0	Teams: (France) R-ace GP	2017 Eurocup Formula Renault 2.0
Eurocup Formula Renault 2.0	Rookie: (United Kingdom) Max Fewtrell	2017 Eurocup Formula Renault 2.0
Asian Formula Renault Series	(Macau) Leong Hon Chio	2017 Asian Formula Renault Series
Formula Renault 2.0 Northern European Cup	(Morocco) Michaël Benyahia	2017 Formula Renault 2.0 Northern European Cup
Formula Renault 2.0 Northern European Cup	Teams: (France) R-ace GP	2017 Formula Renault 2.0 Northern European Cup
French F4 Championship	(France) Arthur Rougier	2017 French F4 Championship
French F4 Championship	Junior: (France) Victor Martins	2017 French F4 Championship
French F4 Championship	International: (France) Arthur Rougier	2017 French F4 Championship
Formula Renault 2.0 Argentina	(Argentina) Hernán Satler	2017 Formula Renault 2.0 Argentina
V de V Challenge Monoplace	(Australia) Gilles Heriau	2017 V de V Challenge Monoplace

== Rallying ==
Series	Champion	refer
FIA World Rally Championship	(France) Sébastien Ogier; Co-driver: (France) Julien Ingrassia	2017 World Rally Championship
FIA World Rally Championship	Teams: (United Kingdom) M-Sport World Rally Team	2017 World Rally Championship
FIA World Rally Championship-2	(Sweden) Pontus Tidemand; Co-driver: (Sweden) Jonas Andersson	2017 FIA World Rally Championship-2
FIA World Rally Championship-2	Teams: (Czech Republic) Škoda Motorsport	2017 FIA World Rally Championship-2
FIA World Rally Championship-3	(Spain) Nil Solans; Co-driver: (Spain) Miquel Ibáñez	2017 FIA World Rally Championship-3
FIA World Rally Championship-3	Teams: (Germany) ADAC Sachsen	2017 FIA World Rally Championship-3
FIA Junior World Rally Championship	(Spain) Nil Solans; Co-driver: (Spain) Miquel Ibáñez	2017 FIA Junior World Rally Championship
FIA R-GT Cup	(France) Romain Dumas	2017 FIA R-GT Cup
ADAC Opel Rallye Cup	(Sweden) Tom Kristensson; Co-driver: (Sweden) Henrik Appelskog	2017 ADAC Opel Rallye Cup
African Rally Championship	(Kenya) Manvir Baryan	2017 African Rally Championship
African Rally Championship	Co-Drivers: (United Kingdom) Drew Sturrock	2017 African Rally Championship
Asia-Pacific Rally Championship	(India) Gaurav Gill	2017 Asia-Pacific Rally Championship
Asia-Pacific Rally Championship	Co-Drivers: (Belgium) Stéphane Prévot	2017 Asia-Pacific Rally Championship
Australian Rally Championship	(Australia) Nathan Quinn	2017 Australian Rally Championship
Australian Rally Championship	Co-Drivers: (Australia) Bill Hayes	2017 Australian Rally Championship
British Rally Championship	(Republic of Ireland) Keith Cronin; Co-driver: (Republic of Ireland) Mikie Galvin	2017 British Rally Championship
Canadian Rally Championship	(Canada) Antoine L'Estage	2017 Canadian Rally Championship
Canadian Rally Championship	Co-Drivers: (Canada) Alan Ockwell	2017 Canadian Rally Championship
Central European Zone Rally Championship	(Hungary) László Mekler	2016 Central European Zone Rally Championship
Codasur South American Rally Championship	(Paraguay) Gustavo Saba	2017 Codasur South American Rally Championship
Czech Rally Championship	(Czech Republic) Jan Kopecký; Co-driver: (Czech Republic) Pavel Dresler	2017 Czech Rally Championship
Deutsche Rallye Meisterschaft	(Germany) Fabian Kreim	
Estonian Rally Championship	(Estonia) Georg Gross	2017 Estonian Rally Championship
Estonian Rally Championship	Co-Drivers: (Estonia) Raigo Mõlder	2017 Estonian Rally Championship
European Rally Championship	(Poland) Kajetan Kajetanowicz	2017 European Rally Championship
European Rally Championship	Teams: (Turkey) Castrol Ford Team Turkiye	2017 European Rally Championship
European Rally Championship	ERC-2: (Hungary) Tibor Érdi	2017 European Rally Championship
European Rally Championship	ERC-3: (United Kingdom) Chris Ingram	2017 European Rally Championship
European Rally Championship	Ladies Trophy: (Italy) Tamara Molinaro	2017 European Rally Championship
European Rally Championship	ERC Junior U28: (Germany) Marijan Griebel	2017 European Rally Championship
European Rally Championship	ERC Junior U27: (United Kingdom) Chris Ingram	2017 European Rally Championship
French Rally Championship	(France) Yoann Bonato	
Hungarian Rally Championship	(Hungary) Norbert Herczig	
Hungarian Rally Championship	Co-Drivers: (Hungary) Igor Bacigál	
Indian National Rally Championship	(India) Gaurav Gill	
Indian National Rally Championship	Co-Drivers: (India) Musa Sherif	
Italian Rally Championship	(Italy) Paolo Andreucci	
Italian Rally Championship	Co-Drivers: (Italy) Anna Andreussi	
Italian Rally Championship	Manufacturers: (France) Peugeot	
Middle East Rally Championship	(Qatar) Nasser Al-Attiyah	
NACAM Rally Championship	(Mexico) Ricardo Triviño	2017 NACAM Rally Championship
NACAM Rally Championship	Co-Drivers: (Mexico) Marco Hernández	2017 NACAM Rally Championship
New Zealand Rally Championship	(New Zealand) Andrew Hawkeswood	2017 New Zealand Rally Championship
New Zealand Rally Championship	Co-Drivers: (New Zealand) Jeff Cress	2017 New Zealand Rally Championship
Polish Rally Championship	(Poland) Filip Nivette	
Rally America	(Poland) Arkadiusz Gruszka	
Romanian Rally Championship	(Romania) Bogdan Marișca	
Scottish Rally Championship	(United Kingdom) Euan Thorburn; Co-driver: (United Kingdom) Paul Beaton	2017 Scottish Rally Championship
Slovak Rally Championship	(Czech Republic) Pavel Valoušek	
Slovak Rally Championship	Co-Drivers: (Czech Republic) Veronika Havelková	
South African National Rally Championship	(South Africa) Guy Botterill	
South African National Rally Championship	Co-Drivers: (South Africa) Simon Vacy-Lyle	
Spanish Rally Championship	(Spain) Iván Ares	
Spanish Rally Championship	Co-Drivers: (Spain) Alberto Iglesias	

=== Rallycross ===
Series	Champion	refer
FIA World Rallycross Championship	(Sweden) Johan Kristoffersson	2017 FIA World Rallycross Championship
FIA World Rallycross Championship	Teams: Volkswagen RX Sweden	2017 FIA World Rallycross Championship
FIA World Rallycross Championship	RX2: (France) Cyril Raymond	2017 FIA World Rallycross Championship
FIA European Rallycross Championship	(Sweden) Anton Marklund	2017 FIA European Rallycross Championship
FIA European Rallycross Championship	Super1600: (Hungary) Krisztián Szabó	2017 FIA European Rallycross Championship
FIA European Rallycross Championship	TouringCar: (Norway) Lars Øivind Enerberg	2017 FIA European Rallycross Championship
Global Rallycross	(United States) Scott Speed	2017 Global Rallycross Championship
Global Rallycross	Manufacturers: (Germany) Volkswagen	2017 Global Rallycross Championship
Global Rallycross	GRC Lites: (France) Cyril Raymond	2017 Global Rallycross Championship
British Rallycross Championship	(United Kingdom) Dan Rooke	

== Sports car and GT ==
Series	Champion	refer
FIA World Endurance Championship	(New Zealand) Brendon Hartley (New Zealand) Earl Bamber (Germany) Timo Bernhard	2017 FIA World Endurance Championship
FIA World Endurance Championship	Manufacturers: (Germany) Porsche	2017 FIA World Endurance Championship
FIA World Endurance Championship	LMP2: (France) Julien Canal; LMP2: (Brazil) Bruno Senna	2017 FIA World Endurance Championship
FIA World Endurance Championship	LMP2 Teams: (Switzerland) Vaillante Rebellion	2017 FIA World Endurance Championship
FIA World Endurance Championship	GTE: (United Kingdom) James Calado; GTE: (Italy) Alessandro Pier Guidi	2017 FIA World Endurance Championship
FIA World Endurance Championship	GTE Manufacturers: (Italy) Ferrari	2017 FIA World Endurance Championship
FIA World Endurance Championship	GTE Pro Teams: (Italy) AF Corse	2017 FIA World Endurance Championship
FIA World Endurance Championship	GTE Am: (Canada) Paul Dalla Lana; GTE Am: (Portugal) Pedro Lamy; GTE Am: (Austria) Mathias Lauda	2017 FIA World Endurance Championship
FIA World Endurance Championship	GTE Am Teams: (United Kingdom) Aston Martin Racing	2017 FIA World Endurance Championship
24H Series	(Switzerland) Roland Eggimann (Netherlands) Christiaan Frankenhout (Germany) Kenneth Heyer (Switzerland) Chantal Kroll (Switzerland) Michael Kroll	2017 24H Series
24H Series	A6: (Switzerland) Roland Eggimann; A6: (Netherlands) Christiaan Frankenhout; A6: (Germany) Kenneth Heyer; A6: (Switzerland) Chantal Kroll; A6: (Switzerland) Michael Kroll	2017 24H Series
24H Series	A6 Teams: (Switzerland) Hofor-Racing	2017 24H Series
24H Series	A6-Am: (Switzerland) Roland Eggimann; A6-Am: (Netherlands) Christiaan Frankenhout; A6-Am: (Germany) Kenneth Heyer; A6-Am: (Switzerland) Chantal Kroll; A6-Am: (Switzerland) Michael Kroll	2017 24H Series
24H Series	A6-Am Teams: (Switzerland) Hofor-Racing	2017 24H Series
24H Series	SPX: (United States) Vic Rice	2017 24H Series
24H Series	SPX Teams: (United Arab Emirates) GDL Racing Middle East	2017 24H Series
24H Series	991: (United States) Charles Espenlaub; 991: (United States) Joe Foster; 991: (United States) Charles Putman	2017 24H Series
24H Series	991 Teams: (Germany) PROsport Performance	2017 24H Series
24H Series	991-Am: (Austria) Philipp Sager; 991-Am: (Austria) Christopher Zöchling	2017 24H Series
24H Series	991-Am Teams: (Germany) MSG Motorsport	2017 24H Series
24H Series	SP2: (Belgium) Raphaël van der Straten	2017 24H Series
24H Series	SP2 Teams: (Belgium) VDS Racing Adventures	2017 24H Series
24H Series	SP3-GT4: (Republic of Ireland) Daniel O'Brien	2017 24H Series
24H Series	SP3-GT4 Teams: (United Kingdom) Optimum Motorsport	2017 24H Series
24H Series	TCR: (France) Thierry Blaise (Denmark) Kim Holmgaard	2017 24H Series
24H Series	TCR Teams: (France) Team Altran Peugeot	2017 24H Series
24H Series	CUP1: (Luxembourg) Jean-Marie Dumont; CUP1: (France) Nicolas Schmit	2017 24H Series
24H Series	CUP1 Teams: (Luxembourg) DUWO Racing	2017 24H Series
24H Series	A2: (Denmark) Jan Engelbrecht; A2: (Denmark) Jacob Kristensen; A2: (Denmark) Henrik Sørensen	2017 24H Series
24H Series	A2 Teams: (Denmark) Team Eva Solo / K-Rejser	2017 24H Series
24H Series	Rookies: (Germany) Max Edelhoff	2017 24H Series
24H Series	Ladies' Cup: (Switzerland) Chantal Kroll	2017 24H Series
ADAC GT Masters	(France) Jules Gounon	2017 ADAC GT Masters
ADAC GT Masters	Teams: (Germany) Callaway Competition	2017 ADAC GT Masters
ADAC GT Masters	Junior: (France) Jules Gounon	2017 ADAC GT Masters
ADAC GT Masters	Trophy: (Switzerland) Remo Lips	2017 ADAC GT Masters
Asian Le Mans Series	LMP2: (Italy) Andrea Roda	2016-17 Asian Le Mans Series
Asian Le Mans Series	LMP3: (United Kingdom) Philip Hanson; LMP3: (United Kingdom) Nigel Moore	2016-17 Asian Le Mans Series
Asian Le Mans Series	GT: (Italy) Michele Rugolo	2016-17 Asian Le Mans Series
Asian Le Mans Series	GT Cup: (Japan) Takuma Aoki; GT Cup: (Japan) Shinyo Sano	2016-17 Asian Le Mans Series
Asian Le Mans Series	CN: (Japan) Kenji Abe; CN: (Japan) Akihiro Asai; CN: (China) Qin Tianqi; CN: (Thailand) Tira Sosothikul; CN: (Thailand) Medhapan Sundaradeja	2016-17 Asian Le Mans Series
Asian Le Mans Series	LMP2 Teams: (Portugal) Algarve Pro Racing	2016-17 Asian Le Mans Series
Asian Le Mans Series	LMP3 Teams: (United Kingdom) Tockwith Motorsports	2016-17 Asian Le Mans Series
Asian Le Mans Series	GT Teams: (Hong Kong) DH Racing	2016-17 Asian Le Mans Series
Asian Le Mans Series	GT Cup Teams: (Japan) TKS	2016-17 Asian Le Mans Series
Asian Le Mans Series	CN Teams: (Finland) PS Racing	2016-17 Asian Le Mans Series
Audi Sport TT Cup	(United Kingdom) Philip Ellis	2017 Audi Sport TT Cup
Australian GT Championship	(Australia) Geoff Emery	2017 Australian GT Championship
Blancpain GT Series Asia	(United Kingdom) Hunter Abbott	2017 Blancpain GT Series Asia
Blancpain GT Series Asia	Teams: (Hong Kong) GruppeM Racing Team	2017 Blancpain GT Series Asia
Blancpain GT Series Asia	GT4: (France) Jean-Marc Merlin; GT4: (Hong Kong) Frank Yu	2017 Blancpain GT Series Asia
Blancpain GT Series Asia	GT4 Teams: (Hong Kong) Craft-Bamboo Racing	2017 Blancpain GT Series Asia
Blancpain GT Series Asia	Pro-Am: (United Kingdom) Hunter Abbott	2017 Blancpain GT Series Asia
Blancpain GT Series Asia	Silver: (Hong Kong) Marchy Lee; Silver: (Hong Kong) Shaun Thong	2017 Blancpain GT Series Asia
Blancpain GT Series Asia	Am-Am: (China) James Cai; Am-Am: (Malaysia) Kenneth Lim	2017 Blancpain GT Series Asia
Blancpain GT Series Endurance Cup	(Italy) Mirko Bortolotti (Italy) Andrea Caldarelli (Germany) Christian Engelhart	2017 Blancpain GT Series Endurance Cup
Blancpain GT Series Endurance Cup	Teams: (Austria) GRT Grasser Racing Team	2017 Blancpain GT Series Endurance Cup
Blancpain GT Series Endurance Cup	Pro-Am Cup: (United Kingdom) Jonathan Adam; Pro-Am Cup: (Oman) Ahmad Al Harthy	2017 Blancpain GT Series Endurance Cup
Blancpain GT Series Endurance Cup	Pro-Am Cup Teams: Oman Racing Team with TF Sport	2017 Blancpain GT Series Endurance Cup
Blancpain GT Series Endurance Cup	Am Cup: (Belgium) Jacques Duyver; Am Cup: (South Africa) David Perel; Am Cup: (Italy) Marco Zanuttini	2017 Blancpain GT Series Endurance Cup
Blancpain GT Series Endurance Cup	Am Cup Teams: (Switzerland) Kessel Racing	2017 Blancpain GT Series Endurance Cup
Blancpain GT Series Sprint Cup	(United Kingdom) Stuart Leonard (Netherlands) Robin Frijns	2017 Blancpain GT Series Sprint Cup
Blancpain GT Series Sprint Cup	Teams: (Belgium) Belgian Audi Club Team WRT	2017 Blancpain GT Series Sprint Cup
Blancpain GT Series Sprint Cup	Pro-Am Cup: (Germany) Daniel Keilwitz; Pro-Am Cup: (Germany) Alexander Mattschull	2017 Blancpain GT Series Sprint Cup
Blancpain GT Series Sprint Cup	Pro-Am Cup Teams: (Germany) Rinaldi Racing	2017 Blancpain GT Series Sprint Cup
Blancpain GT Series Sprint Cup	Silver Cup: (Germany) Fabian Schiller; Silver Cup: (Netherlands) Jules Szymkowiak	2017 Blancpain GT Series Sprint Cup
Blancpain GT Series Sprint Cup	Silver Cup Teams: (Germany) HTP Motorsport	2017 Blancpain GT Series Sprint Cup
Blancpain GT Series Sprint Cup	Am Cup: (United States) Stephen Earle; Am Cup: (South Africa) David Perel	2017 Blancpain GT Series Sprint Cup
Blancpain GT Series Sprint Cup	Am Cup Teams: (Switzerland) Kessel Racing	2017 Blancpain GT Series Sprint Cup
Blancpain GT Sports Club	(France) Anthony Pons	2017 Blancpain GT Sports Club
Blancpain GT Sports Club	Iron Cup: (United States) Stephen Earle	2017 Blancpain GT Sports Club
British GT Championship	GT3: (United Kingdom) Rick Parfitt; GT3: (United Kingdom) Seb Morris	2017 British GT Championship
British GT Championship	GT3 Teams: (United Kingdom) Barwell Motorsport	2017 British GT Championship
British GT Championship	GT3 Pro-Am: (United Kingdom) Rick Parfitt; GT3 Pro-Am: (United Kingdom) Seb Morris	2017 British GT Championship
British GT Championship	GT3 Silver: (United Kingdom) James Littlejohn; GT3 Silver: (United Kingdom) Jack Mitchell	2017 British GT Championship
British GT Championship	Gentleman's Trophy: (United Kingdom) Rick Parfitt	2017 British GT Championship
British GT Championship	GT4: (United Kingdom) Stuart Middleton; GT4: (United Kingdom) William Tregurtha	2017 British GT Championship
British GT Championship	GT4 Teams: (United Kingdom) HHC Motorsport	2017 British GT Championship
British GT Championship	GT4 Pro-Am: (United Kingdom) Graham Johnson; GT4 Pro-Am: (United Kingdom) Mike Robinson	2017 British GT Championship
British GT Championship	GT4 Silver: (United Kingdom) Stuart Middleton; GT4 Silver: (United Kingdom) William Tregurtha	2017 British GT Championship
Continental Tire SportsCar Challenge	Grand Sport: (United States) Dylan Murcott; Grand Sport: (United States) Dillon Machavern	2017 Continental Tire SportsCar Challenge
Continental Tire SportsCar Challenge	Grand Sport Manufacturers: (Germany) Porsche	2017 Continental Tire SportsCar Challenge
Continental Tire SportsCar Challenge	Street Tuner: (United States) Eric Foss	2017 Continental Tire SportsCar Challenge
Continental Tire SportsCar Challenge	Street Tuner Manufacturers: (Germany) Porsche	2017 Continental Tire SportsCar Challenge
FRD LMP3 Series	(United Kingdom) James Winslow (Switzerland) Mathias Beche	2017 FRD LMP3 Series
Ginetta GT4 Supercup	(United Kingdom) Callum Pointon	2017 Ginetta GT4 Supercup
Ginetta GT4 Supercup	Amateur: (United Kingdom) Jac Constable	2017 Ginetta GT4 Supercup
Ginetta Junior Championship	(United Kingdom) Tom Gamble	2017 Ginetta Junior Championship
Global MX-5 Cup	(United States) Patrick Gallagher	2017 Global MX-5 Cup
GT4 European Series Northern Cup	(Netherlands) Ricardo van der Ende (Netherlands) Max Koebolt	2017 GT4 European Series Northern Cup
GT4 European Series Northern Cup	Teams: (Netherlands) Ekris Motorsport	2017 GT4 European Series Northern Cup
GT4 European Series Northern Cup	Pro-Am: (Netherlands) Luc Braams; Pro-Am: (Netherlands) Duncan Huisman	2017 GT4 European Series Northern Cup
GT4 European Series Northern Cup	Am: (Italy) Giuseppe Ghezzi	2017 GT4 European Series Northern Cup
GT4 European Series Southern Cup	(France) Mike Parisy (France) Gilles Vannelet	2017 GT4 European Series Southern Cup
GT4 European Series Southern Cup	Teams: (France) Speed Car (/ AT Events)	2017 GT4 European Series Southern Cup
GT4 European Series Southern Cup	Am: (France) Stéphane Tribaudini	2017 GT4 European Series Southern Cup
GT4 European Series Southern Cup	Am Teams: (France) CMR	2017 GT4 European Series Southern Cup
IMSA Prototype Challenge	TBD	2017 IMSA Prototype Challenge
IMSA Prototype Challenge	MPC: (United States) Kyle Masson	2017 IMSA Prototype Challenge
Intercontinental GT Challenge	(Germany) Markus Winkelhock	2017 Intercontinental GT Challenge
Intercontinental GT Challenge	Manufacturers: (Germany) Audi	2017 Intercontinental GT Challenge
Intercontinental GT Challenge	GT4 Manufacturers: (Germany) Porsche	2017 Intercontinental GT Challenge
Mercedes-Benz Challenge	(Brazil) Fernando Júnior	2017 Mercedes-Benz Challenge season
Pirelli World Challenge	GT: (United States) Patrick Long	2017 Pirelli World Challenge
Pirelli World Challenge	GT Manufacturers: (Germany) Porsche	2017 Pirelli World Challenge
Pirelli World Challenge	GTA: (United States) James Sofronas	2017 Pirelli World Challenge
Pirelli World Challenge	GT Cup: (Japan) Yuki Harata	2017 Pirelli World Challenge
Pirelli World Challenge	GTS: (United States) Lawson Aschenbach	2017 Pirelli World Challenge
Pirelli World Challenge	GTS Manufacturers: (United States) Chevrolet	2017 Pirelli World Challenge
Pirelli World Challenge	GTSA: (United States) George Kurtz	2017 Pirelli World Challenge
Pirelli World Challenge	TC/TCA/TCB: (United States) Paul Holton	2017 Pirelli World Challenge
SprintX GT Championship Series	GT: (United States) Michael Cooper; GT: (United States) Jordan Taylor	2017 SprintX GT Championship Series
SprintX GT Championship Series	GT Pro-Am: (United States) James Sofronas	2017 SprintX GT Championship Series
SprintX GT Championship Series	GT Cup Pro-Am: (Italy) Alessandro Bressan; GT Cup Pro-Am: (Japan) Yuki Harata	2017 SprintX GT Championship Series
SprintX GT Championship Series	GTS Pro-Am: (United States) Trent Hindman; GTS Pro-Am: (United States) Adam Merzon	2017 SprintX GT Championship Series
SprintX GT Championship Series	GT Am: (Venezuela) Henrique Cisneros	2017 SprintX GT Championship Series
SprintX GT Championship Series	GT Cup Am: (United States) Cory Friedman; GT Cup Am: (United States) Joe Toussaint	2017 SprintX GT Championship Series
SprintX GT Championship Series	GTS Am: (United States) Ari Balogh; GTS Am: (United States) Greg Liefooghe	2017 SprintX GT Championship Series
Super GT	(Japan) Ryo Hirakawa (New Zealand) Nick Cassidy	2017 Super GT Series
Super GT	Teams: (Japan) #37 Lexus Team KeePer Tom's	2017 Super GT Series
Super GT	GT300: (Japan) Nobuteru Taniguchi; GT300: (Japan) Tatsuya Kataoka	2017 Super GT Series
Super GT	GT300 Teams: (Japan) #4 Goodsmile Racing & TeamUKYO	2017 Super GT Series
Toyota Finance 86 Championship	(New Zealand) Ryan Yardley	2016-17 Toyota Finance 86 Championship
WeatherTech SportsCar Championship	Prototype: (United States) Jordan Taylor; Prototype: (United States) Ricky Taylor	2017 WeatherTech SportsCar Championship
WeatherTech SportsCar Championship	Prototype Manufacturers: (United States) Cadillac	2017 WeatherTech SportsCar Championship
WeatherTech SportsCar Championship	Prototype Challenge: (United States) James French; Prototype Challenge: (Mexico) Patricio O'Ward	2017 WeatherTech SportsCar Championship
WeatherTech SportsCar Championship	GT Le Mans: (Spain) Antonio García; GT Le Mans: (Denmark) Jan Magnussen	2017 WeatherTech SportsCar Championship
WeatherTech SportsCar Championship	GT Le Mans Manufacturers: (United States) Chevrolet	2017 WeatherTech SportsCar Championship
WeatherTech SportsCar Championship	GT Daytona: (Italy) Alessandro Balzan; GT Daytona: (Denmark) Christina Nielsen	2017 WeatherTech SportsCar Championship
WeatherTech SportsCar Championship	GT Daytona Manufacturers: (Italy) Ferrari	2017 WeatherTech SportsCar Championship
Porsche Carrera Cup and GT3 Cup Challenge
Porsche Supercup	(Germany) Michael Ammermüller	2017 Porsche Supercup
Porsche Supercup	Teams: (Austria) Lechner MSG Racing Team	2017 Porsche Supercup
Porsche Supercup	Rookies: (Norway) Dennis Olsen	2017 Porsche Supercup
Porsche Carrera Cup Asia	(New Zealand) Chris van der Drift	2017 Porsche Carrera Cup Asia
Porsche Carrera Cup Australia	(Australia) David Wall	2017 Porsche Carrera Cup Australia
Porsche Carrera Cup France	(France) Julien Andlauer	2017 Porsche Carrera Cup France
Porsche Carrera Cup Germany	(Norway) Dennis Olsen	2017 Porsche Carrera Cup Germany
Porsche Carrera Cup Germany	Teams: (Germany) Team Deutsche Post by Project 1	2017 Porsche Carrera Cup Germany
Porsche Carrera Cup Germany	Rookies: (Netherlands) Larry Ten Voorde	2017 Porsche Carrera Cup Germany
Porsche Carrera Cup Germany	Amateurs: (Germany) Wolfgang Triller	2017 Porsche Carrera Cup Germany
Porsche Carrera Cup Great Britain	(Republic of Ireland) Charlie Eastwood	2017 Porsche Carrera Cup Great Britain
Porsche Carrera Cup Great Britain	Pro-Am 1: (United Kingdom) Alex Martin	2017 Porsche Carrera Cup Great Britain
Porsche Carrera Cup Great Britain	Pro-Am 2: (United Kingdom) Peter Kyle-Henney	2017 Porsche Carrera Cup Great Britain
Porsche Carrera Cup Italy	(Italy) Alessio Rovera	2017 Porsche Carrera Cup Italy
Porsche Carrera Cup Japan	(Japan) Shinji Takei	2017 Porsche Carrera Cup Japan
Porsche Carrera Cup Scandinavia	(Sweden) Joakim Mangs	2017 Porsche Carrera Cup Scandinavia
Porsche GT3 Cup Brasil	(Brazil) Rodrigo Baptista	2017 Porsche GT3 Cup Brasil
Porsche GT3 Cup Brasil	Challenge: (Brazil) Marçal Müller	2017 Porsche GT3 Cup Brasil
Porsche GT3 Cup Challenge Benelux	(Netherlands) Xavier Maassen	2017 Porsche GT3 Cup Challenge Benelux
Porsche GT3 Cup Challenge Benelux	B-Class: (Belgium) Glenn Van Parys	2017 Porsche GT3 Cup Challenge Benelux
Porsche GT3 Middle East Championship	(Republic of Ireland) Ryan Cullen	2017 Porsche GT3 Middle East Championship
IMSA GT3 Cup Challenge	(United States) Jake Eidson	2017 IMSA GT3 Cup Challenge
IMSA GT3 Cup Challenge Canada	(Canada) Scott Hargrove	2017 IMSA GT3 Cup Challenge Canada
Ferrari Challenge
Finali Mondiali	Trofeo Pirelli Pro: (Switzerland) Fabio Leimer; Trofeo Pirelli Pro-Am: (Germany) Jens Liebhauser; Coppa Shell Am: (Denmark) Johnny Laursen; 458 Challenge: (United States) Joseph Rubbo	2017 Finali Mondiali
Ferrari Challenge Europe	Trofeo Pirelli Pro: (Italy) Daniele di Amato; Trofeo Pirelli Pro-Am: (Germany) Jens Liebhauser; Coppa Shell Am: (Denmark) Johnny Laursen	2017 Ferrari Challenge Europe
Ferrari Challenge North America	Trofeo Pirelli Pro: (United States) Brett Curtis; Trofeo Pirelli Pro-Am: (United States) Chris Cagnazzi; Coppa Shell Am: (United States) Richard Baek	2017 Ferrari Challenge North America
Ferrari Challenge Asia-Pacific	Trofeo Pirelli Pro: (Italy) Philippe Prette; Trofeo Pirelli Pro-Am: (Japan) Ken Seto; Coppa Shell Am: (Japan) Makoto Fujiwara	2017 Ferrari Challenge Asia-Pacific

== Stock car racing ==
Series	Champion	refer
American Canadian Tour	(United States) Scott Payea	2017 American Canadian Tour
ARCA Racing Series	(United States) Austin Theriault	2017 ARCA Racing Series
International Supermodified Association	(United States) Jon McKennedy	2017 International Supermodified Association
Stock Car Brasil	(Brazil) Daniel Serra	2017 Stock Car Brasil Championship
Turismo Carretera	(Argentina) Agustín Canapino	2017 Turismo Carretera Championship
NASCAR
Monster Energy NASCAR Cup Series	(United States) Martin Truex Jr.	2017 Monster Energy NASCAR Cup Series
Monster Energy NASCAR Cup Series	Manufacturers: (Japan) Toyota	2017 Monster Energy NASCAR Cup Series
NASCAR Xfinity Series	(United States) William Byron	2017 NASCAR Xfinity Series
NASCAR Xfinity Series	Manufacturers: (United States) Chevrolet	2017 NASCAR Xfinity Series
NASCAR Camping World Truck Series	(United States) Christopher Bell	2017 NASCAR Camping World Truck Series
NASCAR Camping World Truck Series	Manufacturers: (Japan) Toyota	2017 NASCAR Camping World Truck Series
NASCAR K&N Pro Series East	(United States) Harrison Burton	2017 NASCAR K&N Pro Series East
NASCAR K&N Pro Series West	(United States) Todd Gilliland	2017 NASCAR K&N Pro Series West
NASCAR PEAK Mexico Series	(Mexico) Abraham Calderón	2017 NASCAR PEAK Mexico Series
NASCAR Pinty's Series	(Canada) Alex Labbé	2017 NASCAR Pinty's Series
NASCAR Pinty's Series	Manufacturers: (United States) Ford	2017 NASCAR Pinty's Series
NASCAR Whelen Euro Series	(Israel) Alon Day	2017 NASCAR Whelen Euro Series
NASCAR Whelen Euro Series	Elite 2: (France) Thomas Ferrando	2017 NASCAR Whelen Euro Series
NASCAR Whelen Modified Tour	(United States) Doug Coby	2017 NASCAR Whelen Modified Tour

== Touring cars ==
Series	Champion	refer
World Touring Car Championship	(Sweden) Thed Björk	2017 World Touring Car Championship
World Touring Car Championship	Manufacturers: (Sweden) Volvo Polestar	2017 World Touring Car Championship
World Touring Car Championship	Trophy: (United Kingdom) Tom Chilton	2017 World Touring Car Championship
World Touring Car Championship	Teams Trophy: (France) Sébastien Loeb Racing	2017 World Touring Car Championship
Aussie Racing Cars	(Australia) James Duckworth	2017 Aussie Racing Car season
Brasileiro de Marcas	(Brazil) Vicente Orige	2017 Brasileiro de Marcas
Brasileiro de Marcas	Teams: (Brazil) JML Racing	2017 Brasileiro de Marcas
Brasileiro de Marcas	Manufacturers: (United States) Chevrolet	2017 Brasileiro de Marcas
British Touring Car Championship	(United Kingdom) Ashley Sutton	2017 British Touring Car Championship
British Touring Car Championship	Teams: (United Kingdom) Team BMW	2017 British Touring Car Championship
British Touring Car Championship	Manufacturers: (Germany) BMW / West Surrey Racing	2017 British Touring Car Championship
British Touring Car Championship	Independent: (United Kingdom) Tom Ingram	2017 British Touring Car Championship
British Touring Car Championship	Independent Teams: (United Kingdom) Speedworks Motorsport	2017 British Touring Car Championship
British Touring Car Championship	Jack Spears Trophy: (United Kingdom) Senna Proctor	2017 British Touring Car Championship
Campeonato Brasileiro de Turismo	(Brazil) Gabriel Robe	2017 Campeonato Brasileiro de Turismo season
Deutsche Tourenwagen Masters	(Germany) René Rast	2017 Deutsche Tourenwagen Masters
Deutsche Tourenwagen Masters	Manufacturers: (Germany) Audi	2017 Deutsche Tourenwagen Masters
Deutsche Tourenwagen Masters	Teams: (Germany) Team Rosberg	2017 Deutsche Tourenwagen Masters
European Touring Car Cup	(Czech Republic) Petr Fulin	2017 European Touring Car Cup
Mini Challenge UK	(United Kingdom) Brett Smith	2017 Mini Challenge UK
NZ Touring Cars Championship	(New Zealand) Simon Evans	2016-17 NZ Touring Cars Championship
NZ Touring Cars Championship	Class Two: (New Zealand) Liam MacDonald	2016-17 NZ Touring Cars Championship
Renault Clio Cup United Kingdom	(United Kingdom) Mike Bushell	2017 Renault UK Clio Cup
Russian Circuit Racing Series	Touring: (Russia) Dmitry Bragin	2017 Russian Circuit Racing Series
Russian Circuit Racing Series	TCR Russia Touring Car Championship: Dmitry Bragin	2017 Russian Circuit Racing Series
Russian Circuit Racing Series	Super-Production: (Russia) Mikhail Mityaev	2017 Russian Circuit Racing Series
Russian Circuit Racing Series	Touring-Light: (Russia) Denis Bulatov	2017 Russian Circuit Racing Series
Russian Circuit Racing Series	National: (Russia) Aidar Nuriev	2017 Russian Circuit Racing Series
Russian Circuit Racing Series	National Junior: (Russia) Maxim Kornilkov	2017 Russian Circuit Racing Series
Súper TC2000	(Argentina) Facundo Ardusso	2017 Súper TC2000
Súper TC2000	Teams: (Argentina) Renault Sport	2017 Súper TC2000
Súper TC2000	Manufacturers: (United States) Chevrolet	2017 Súper TC2000
Supercars Championship	(Australia) Jamie Whincup	2017 Supercars Championship
Supercars Championship	Teams: (Australia) DJR Team Penske	2017 Supercars Championship
Supercars Championship	Manufacturers: (United States) Ford	2017 Supercars Championship
Supercars Championship	Endurance Cup: (Australia) Chaz Mostert; Endurance Cup: (Australia) Steve Owen	2017 Supercars Championship
Super2 Series	(Australia) Todd Hazelwood	2017 Dunlop Super2 Series
Touring Car Masters	(Australia) Steven Johnson	2017 Touring Car Masters
TCR Series
TCR International Series	(France) Jean-Karl Vernay	2017 TCR International Series
TCR International Series	Teams: (Hungary) M1RA	2017 TCR International Series
TCR International Series	Model: (Japan) Honda Civic Type R TCR	2017 TCR International Series
TCR Asia Series	(Thailand) Kantadhee Kusiri	2017 TCR Asia Series
TCR Asia Series	Teams: (Germany) Engstler Motorsport	2017 TCR Asia Series
TCR Baltic Trophy	(Lithuania) Ernesta Globyte	2017 TCR Baltic Trophy
TCR BeNeLux Touring Car Championship	(Belgium) Benjamin Lessennes	2017 TCR BeNeLux Touring Car Championship
TCR BeNeLux Touring Car Championship	Teams: (Belgium) Delahaye Racing	2017 TCR BeNeLux Touring Car Championship
TCR BeNeLux Touring Car Championship	Junior: (Belgium) Benjamin Lessennes	2017 TCR BeNeLux Touring Car Championship
TCR BeNeLux Touring Car Championship	Cars: (Japan) Honda Civic TCR	2017 TCR BeNeLux Touring Car Championship
ADAC TCR Germany Touring Car Championship	(United Kingdom) Josh Files	2017 ADAC TCR Germany Touring Car Championship
ADAC TCR Germany Touring Car Championship	Teams: (United Kingdom) Target Competition UK-SUI	2017 ADAC TCR Germany Touring Car Championship
TCR Ibérico Touring Car Series	(Portugal) Francisco Abreu	2017 TCR Ibérico Touring Car Series
TCR Ibérico Touring Car Series	Class 2: (Portugal) Joao Sousa; Class 2: (Portugal) Rita Grasa	2017 TCR Ibérico Touring Car Series
Italian Touring Car Championship	(Italy) Nicola Baldan	2017 Italian Touring Car Championship
Italian Touring Car Championship	TCT: (Italy) Raimondo Ricci	2017 Italian Touring Car Championship
Italian Touring Car Championship	Constructors: (Spain) SEAT	2017 Italian Touring Car Championship
TCR Middle East Series	(United Kingdom) Josh Files	2017 TCR Middle East Series
TCR Middle East Series	Teams: (Germany) Liqui Moly Team Engstler	2017 TCR Middle East Series
TCR Scandinavia Touring Car Championship	(Sweden) Robert Dahlgren	2017 TCR Scandinavia Touring Car Championship
TCR Scandinavia Touring Car Championship	Teams: Volkswagen Dealer Team Sweden	2017 TCR Scandinavia Touring Car Championship
TCR Thailand Touring Car Championship	2016-17: (Netherlands) Carlo van Dam	2016-17 TCR Thailand Touring Car Championship
TCR Thailand Touring Car Championship	2016-17 Am: (Taiwan) Chen Jian Hong	2016-17 TCR Thailand Touring Car Championship
TCR Thailand Touring Car Championship	2017: (Thailand) Pasarit Promsombat	2017 TCR Thailand Touring Car Championship
TCR Thailand Touring Car Championship	2017 Am: (Thailand) Chariya Nuya	2017 TCR Thailand Touring Car Championship

== Truck racing ==
Series	Champion	refer
Copa Truck	(Brazil) Felipe Giaffone	2017 Copa Truck season
European Truck Racing Championship	(Czech Republic) Adam Lacko	2017 European Truck Racing Championship
Australian V8 Ute Racing Series	(Australia) Kim Jane	2017 Australian V8 Ute Racing Series
New Zealand Super Truck Series	(New Zealand) Troy Wheeler	2016–17 New Zealand Super Truck Series
New Zealand V8 Ute Series	(New Zealand) Richard Moore	2016–17 New Zealand V8 Ute Series
SsangYong Ute Racing Series	(New Zealand) Daniel Connor	2016–17 SsangYong Ute Racing Series
Stadium Super Trucks	(Australia) Paul Morris	2017 Stadium Super Trucks

== See also ==
- List of motorsport championships
