= List of 2018 motorsport champions =

2018 motorsport champions
Previous: 2017	Next: 2019

This list of 2018 motorsport champions is a list of national or international motorsport series with championships decided by the points or positions earned by a driver from multiple races where the season was completed during the 2018 calendar year.

== Air racing ==
Series	Rider	refer
Red Bull Air Race World Championship	(Czech Republic) Martin Šonka	2018 Red Bull Air Race World Championship
Red Bull Air Race World Championship	Challenger: (Poland) Luke Czepiela	2018 Red Bull Air Race World Championship

== Dirt oval racing ==
Series	Champion	refer
Lucas Oil Late Model Dirt Series	(United States) Jonathan Davenport	2018 Lucas Oil Late Model Dirt Series
Oval Superstars Tour	(New Zealand) Karl McGill	2017-18 Oval Superstars Tour
Oval Superstars Tour	Teams: (New Zealand) McGill Motorsport	2017-18 Oval Superstars Tour
Super DIRTcar Series	(United States) Matt Shepherd	2018 Super DIRTcar Series
World of Outlaws Late Model Series	(United States) Mike Marlar	2018 World of Outlaws Craftsman Late Model Series
World of Outlaws Sprint Car Series	(United States) Donny Schatz	2018 World of Outlaws Craftsman Sprint Car Series

== Drag racing ==
Series	Champion	Refer
NHRA Mello Yello Drag Racing Series	Top Fuel: (United States) Steve Torrence	2018 NHRA Mello Yello Drag Racing Series
NHRA Mello Yello Drag Racing Series	Funny Car: (United States) J. R. Todd	2018 NHRA Mello Yello Drag Racing Series
NHRA Mello Yello Drag Racing Series	Pro Stock: (United States) Tanner Gray	2018 NHRA Mello Yello Drag Racing Series
NHRA Mello Yello Drag Racing Series	Pro Stock Motorcycle: (United States) Matt Smith	2018 NHRA Mello Yello Drag Racing Series
European Drag Racing Championship	Top Fuel: (Finland) Anita Mäkelä	
European Drag Racing Championship	Top Methanol: (Germany) Dennis Habermann	
European Drag Racing Championship	Pro Stock Car: (Sweden) Bengt Ljungdahl	
European Drag Racing Championship	Pro Stock Modified: (Sweden) Jimmy Ålund	

== Drifting ==
Series	Champion	Refer
FIA Intercontinental Drifting Cup	(Russia) Georgy Chivchyan	2018 FIA Intercontinental Drifting Cup
British Drift Championship	(United Kingdom) Duane McKeever	2018 British Drift Championship
British Drift Championship	Pro-Am: (United Kingdom) Lee Scott	2018 British Drift Championship
D1 Grand Prix	(Japan) Masashi Yokoi	2018 D1 Grand Prix series
D1 Grand Prix	D1 Lights: (Japan) Junya Ishikawa	2018 D1 Grand Prix series
D1NZ	(New Zealand) Cole Armstrong	2018 D1NZ season
D1NZ	Pro-Sport: (New Zealand) Liam Burke	2018 D1NZ season
Formula D	(Republic of Ireland) James Deane	2018 Formula D season
Formula D	PROSPEC: (United States) Travis Reeder	2018 Formula D season
Formula D	Manufacturers: (Japan) Nissan	2018 Formula D season
Formula D	Tire Cup: (Japan) Falken	2018 Formula D season
Formula DRIFT Japan	(New Zealand) "Mad" Mike Whiddett	2018 Formula DRIFT Japan
Drift Masters	(Republic of Ireland) James Deane	2018 Drift Masters
Drift Masters	Nations Cup: (Republic of Ireland) Ireland	2018 Drift Masters

== Karting ==
Series	Driver	Season article
CIK-FIA Karting World Championship	OK: (Italy) Lorenzo Travisanutto	
CIK-FIA Karting World Championship	OKJ: (France) Victor Bernier	
CIK-FIA Karting World Championship	KZ: (Czech Republic) Patrik Hájek	
CIK-FIA Karting World Championship	KZ2: (Italy) Matteo Viganò	
CIK-FIA Karting Academy Trophy	(Spain) Mari Boya	2018 CIK-FIA Karting Academy Trophy
CIK-FIA Karting European Championship	OK: (Germany) Hannes Janker	
CIK-FIA Karting European Championship	OK-J: (Estonia) Paul Aron	
CIK-FIA Karting European Championship	KZ: (Netherlands) Jorrit Pex	
CIK-FIA Karting European Championship	KZ2: (France) Adrien Renaudin	
WSK Champions Cup	KZ2: (Romania) Daniel Vasile	
WSK Champions Cup	OK: (Denmark) Nicklas Nielsen	
WSK Champions Cup	OKJ: (Estonia) Paul Aron	
WSK Champions Cup	60 Mini: (Italy) Andrea Kimi Antonelli	
Rotax Max Challenge	DD2: (France) Paolo Besancenez	
Rotax Max Challenge	DD2 Masters: (South Africa) Cristiano Morgado	
Rotax Max Challenge	Senior: (Netherlands) Senna van Walstijn	
Rotax Max Challenge	Junior: (Netherlands) Robert de Haan	
Rotax Max Challenge	Mini: (Germany) Farin Megger	
Rotax Max Challenge	Micro: (United States) Brent Crews	
Rotax Max Challenge	Nations Cup: Brazil	

== Motorcycle racing ==
=== Dirt racing ===
Series	Champion	refer
FIM Motocross World Championship	(Netherlands) Jeffrey Herlings	2018 FIM Motocross World Championship
FIM Motocross World Championship	Manufacturers: (Austria) KTM	2018 FIM Motocross World Championship
FIM Motocross World Championship	MX2: (Spain) Jorge Prado	2018 FIM Motocross World Championship
FIM Motocross World Championship	MX2 Manufacturers: (Austria) KTM	2018 FIM Motocross World Championship
FIM Enduro World Championship	(United Kingdom) Steve Holcombe	2018 FIM Enduro World Championship
FIM Enduro World Championship	Enduro 1: (United Kingdom) Brad Freeman	2018 FIM Enduro World Championship
FIM Enduro World Championship	Enduro 2: (Finland) Eero Remes	2018 FIM Enduro World Championship
FIM Enduro World Championship	Enduro 3: (United Kingdom) Steve Holcombe	2018 FIM Enduro World Championship
FIM Enduro World Championship	Youth Cup: (Chile) Ruy Barbosa	2018 FIM Enduro World Championship
FIM Women's Motocross World Championship	(Italy) Kiara Fontanesi	2018 FIM Women's Motocross World Championship
FIM Women's Motocross World Championship	Manufacturers: (Japan) Yamaha	2018 FIM Women's Motocross World Championship
AMA National Motocross Championship	(United States) Eli Tomac	2018 AMA National Motocross Championship
AMA National Motocross Championship	250cc: (United States) Aaron Plessinger	2018 AMA National Motocross Championship
European Motocross Championship	(France) Mathys Boisrame	2018 European Motocross Championship
European Motocross Championship	Manufacturers: (Japan) Honda	2018 European Motocross Championship
European Motocross Championship	EMX125: (France) Thibault Benistant	2018 European Motocross Championship
European Motocross Championship	EMX125 Manufacturers: (Austria) KTM	2018 European Motocross Championship
European Motocross Championship	EMX300: (United Kingdom) Brad Anderson	2018 European Motocross Championship
European Motocross Championship	EMX300 Manufacturers: (Austria) KTM	2018 European Motocross Championship
European Motocross Championship	EMX85: (South Africa) Camden McLellan	2018 European Motocross Championship
European Motocross Championship	EMX65: (Italy) Brando Rispoli	2018 European Motocross Championship

=== Road racing ===
Series	Champion	refer
MotoGP	(Spain) Marc Márquez	2018 MotoGP World Championship
MotoGP	Teams: (Japan) Repsol Honda Team	2018 MotoGP World Championship
MotoGP	Manufacturers: (Japan) Honda	2018 MotoGP World Championship
Moto2	(Italy) Francesco Bagnaia	2018 Moto2 World Championship
Moto2	Teams: (Finland) Red Bull KTM Ajo	2018 Moto2 World Championship
Moto2	Manufacturers: (Germany) Kalex	2018 Moto2 World Championship
Moto3	(Spain) Jorge Martín	2018 Moto3 World Championship
Moto3	Teams: (Italy) Del Conca Gresini Moto3	2018 Moto3 World Championship
Moto3	Manufacturers: (Japan) Honda	2018 Moto3 World Championship
Superbike World Championship	(United Kingdom) Jonathan Rea	2018 Superbike World Championship
Superbike World Championship	Manufacturers: (Japan) Kawasaki	2018 Superbike World Championship
Supersport World Championship	(Germany) Sandro Cortese	2018 Supersport World Championship
Supersport World Championship	Manufacturers: (Japan) Yamaha	2018 Supersport World Championship
Supersport 300 World Championship	(Spain) Ana Carrasco	2018 Supersport 300 World Championship
Supersport 300 World Championship	Manufacturers: (Japan) Kawasaki	2018 Supersport 300 World Championship
European Superstock 1000 Championship	(Germany) Markus Reiterberger	2018 European Superstock 1000 Championship
European Superstock 1000 Championship	Manufacturers: (Germany) BMW	2018 European Superstock 1000 Championship
Australian Superbike Championship	(Australia) Troy Herfoss	
Australian Superbike Championship	Supersport: (Australia) Cru Halliday	
British Superbike Championship	(United Kingdom) Leon Haslam	2018 British Superbike Championship
British Superbike Championship	Teams: (United Kingdom) JG Speedfit Kawasaki	2018 British Superbike Championship
British Superbike Championship	Riders Cup: (United Kingdom) Tommy Bridewell	2018 British Superbike Championship
New Zealand Superbike Championship	(New Zealand) Sloan Frost	2018 New Zealand Superbike Championship
New Zealand Superbike Championship	Supersport 600: (New Zealand) Jake Lewis	2018 New Zealand Superbike Championship
New Zealand Superbike Championship	Supersport 300: (New Zealand) Dennis Charlett	2018 New Zealand Superbike Championship
New Zealand Superbike Championship	250 Production: (New Zealand) Nick Cain	2018 New Zealand Superbike Championship
New Zealand Superbike Championship	Superlite: (New Zealand) Nathanael Diprose	2018 New Zealand Superbike Championship
New Zealand Superbike Championship	Pro Twin: (New Zealand) Jordan Burley	2018 New Zealand Superbike Championship
New Zealand Superbike Championship	125GP/250 Mono: (United Kingdom) Blayes Heaven	2018 New Zealand Superbike Championship
New Zealand Superbike Championship	Sidecars: (New Zealand) Peter Goodwin; Sidecars: (New Zealand) Kendall Dunlop	2018 New Zealand Superbike Championship
New Zealand Superbike Championship	Gixxer Cup: (New Zealand) Thomas Newton	2018 New Zealand Superbike Championship
Red Bull MotoGP Rookies Cup	(Turkey) Can Öncü	2018 Red Bull MotoGP Rookies Cup

== Open wheel racing ==
Series	Champion	refer
FIA Formula One World Championship	(United Kingdom) Lewis Hamilton	2018 Formula One World Championship
FIA Formula One World Championship	Constructors: (Germany) Mercedes	2018 Formula One World Championship
FIA Formula 2 Championship	(United Kingdom) George Russell	2018 FIA Formula 2 Championship
FIA Formula 2 Championship	Teams: (United Kingdom) Carlin	2018 FIA Formula 2 Championship
GP3 Series	(France) Anthoine Hubert	2018 GP3 Series
GP3 Series	Teams: (France) ART Grand Prix	2018 GP3 Series
FIA Formula E Championship	(France) Jean-Éric Vergne	2017–18 Formula E season
FIA Formula E Championship	Constructors: (Germany) Audi Sport ABT Schaeffler	2017–18 Formula E season
IndyCar Series	(New Zealand) Scott Dixon	2018 IndyCar Series
IndyCar Series	Manufacturers' Cup: (Japan) Honda	2018 IndyCar Series
IndyCar Series	Rookie of the Year: (Canada) Robert Wickens	2018 IndyCar Series
Atlantic Championship	(Argentina) Baltazar Leguizamón	2018 Atlantic Championship
BOSS GP Series	(Austria) Ingo Gerstl	2018 BOSS GP Series
BOSS GP Series	Formula Class: (Germany) Florian Schnitzenbaumer	2018 BOSS GP Series
F2000 Italian Formula Trophy	(Italy) Alessandro Bracalente	2018 F2000 Italian Formula Trophy
F2000 Italian Formula Trophy	Teams: (Italy) Pave Motorsport	2018 F2000 Italian Formula Trophy
Formula STCC Nordic	(Norway) Emil Heyerdahl	2018 Formula STCC Nordic
Indy Lights	(Mexico) Patricio O'Ward	2018 Indy Lights
Indy Lights	Teams: (United States) Andretti Autosport	2018 Indy Lights
MRF Challenge Formula 2000 Championship	(Brazil) Felipe Drugovich	2017–18 MRF Challenge Formula 2000 Championship
New Zealand Formula First Championship	(New Zealand) Callum Crawley	2017-18 New Zealand Formula First Championship
Pro Mazda Championship	(Netherlands) Rinus VeeKay	2018 Pro Mazda Championship
Pro Mazda Championship	Teams: (United States) Juncos Racing	2018 Pro Mazda Championship
Super Formula Championship	(Japan) Naoki Yamamoto	2018 Super Formula Championship
Super Formula Championship	Teams: (Japan) Kondō Racing	2018 Super Formula Championship
FIA Masters Historic Formula One Championship	Fittipaldi/Stewart: (United Kingdom) Greg Thornton	2018 FIA Masters Historic Formula One Championship
FIA Masters Historic Formula One Championship	Head/Lauda: (United Kingdom) Nick Padmore	2018 FIA Masters Historic Formula One Championship
Toyota Racing Series	(Russia) Robert Shwartzman	2018 Toyota Racing Series
Formula Three
FIA Formula 3 European Championship	(Germany) Mick Schumacher	2018 FIA Formula 3 European Championship
FIA Formula 3 European Championship	Teams: (Italy) Prema Theodore Racing	2018 FIA Formula 3 European Championship
FIA Formula 3 European Championship	Rookies: (Russia) Robert Shwartzman	2018 FIA Formula 3 European Championship
All-Japan Formula Three Championship	(Japan) Sho Tsuboi	2018 Japanese Formula 3 Championship
All-Japan Formula Three Championship	Teams: (Japan) Corolla Chukyo Kuo TOM'S	2018 Japanese Formula 3 Championship
All-Japan Formula Three Championship	National: (Australia) Jake Parsons	2018 Japanese Formula 3 Championship
F3 Americas Championship	(United States) Kyle Kirkwood	2018 F3 Americas Championship
F3 Americas Championship	Teams: (United States) Abel Motorsports	2018 F3 Americas Championship
F3 Asian Championship	(United Kingdom) Raoul Hyman	2018 F3 Asian Championship
F3 Asian Championship	Teams: (United Kingdom) Hitech Racing	2018 F3 Asian Championship
F3 Asian Championship	Masters Cup: (China) Yin Hai Tao	2018 F3 Asian Championship
Australian Formula 3 Premier Series	(Australia) Harri Jones	2018 Australian Formula 3 Premier Series
Australian Formula 3 Premier Series	National Class: (Australia) Roman Krumins	2018 Australian Formula 3 Premier Series
Australian Formula 3 Premier Series	Trophy Class: (Australia) Rielly Brook	2018 Australian Formula 3 Premier Series
BRDC British Formula 3 Championship	(Sweden) Linus Lundqvist	2018 BRDC British Formula 3 Championship
Euroformula Open Championship	(Brazil) Felipe Drugovich	2018 Euroformula Open Championship
Euroformula Open Championship	Teams: (Italy) RP Motorsport	2018 Euroformula Open Championship
Euroformula Open Championship	Rookies: (Netherlands) Bent Viscaal	2018 Euroformula Open Championship
MotorSport Vision Formula Three Cup	(Republic of Ireland) Cian Carey	2018 MotorSport Vision Formula Three Cup
MotorSport Vision Formula Three Cup	Teams: (United Kingdom) Chris Dittmann Racing	2018 MotorSport Vision Formula Three Cup
MotorSport Vision Formula Three Cup	Cup: (Republic of Ireland) Cian Carey	2018 MotorSport Vision Formula Three Cup
MotorSport Vision Formula Three Cup	Trophy: (United Kingdom) Ben Cater	2018 MotorSport Vision Formula Three Cup
Remus F3 Cup	(Switzerland) Sandro Zeller	2018 Remus F3 Cup
Remus F3 Cup	Trophy: (Switzerland) Sandro Zeller	2018 Remus F3 Cup
Remus F3 Cup	Drexler Automotive Formula 3 Cup: (Switzerland) Sandro Zeller	2018 Remus F3 Cup
Remus F3 Cup	HORAG Swiss Formula 3 Cup: (Switzerland) Sandro Zeller	2018 Remus F3 Cup
Formula 4
ADAC Formula 4 Championship	(Germany) Lirim Zendeli	2018 ADAC Formula 4 Championship
ADAC Formula 4 Championship	Rookies Cup: (Germany) David Schumacher	2018 ADAC Formula 4 Championship
ADAC Formula 4 Championship	Teams: (Germany) US Racing – CHRS	2018 ADAC Formula 4 Championship
Australian Formula 4 Championship	(Australia) Jayden Ojeda	2018 Australian Formula 4 Championship
Australian Formula 4 Championship	Teams: (Australia) AGI Sport	2018 Australian Formula 4 Championship
F4 British Championship	(United Kingdom) Kiern Jewiss	2018 F4 British Championship
F4 British Championship	Rookie Cup: (Australia) Jack Doohan	2018 F4 British Championship
China Formula 4 Championship	(Republic of Ireland) Jordan Dempsey	2018 China Formula 4 Championship
China Formula 4 Championship	Teams: (China) BlackArts Racing Team	2018 China Formula 4 Championship
F4 Danish Championship	(Denmark) Casper Tobias Hansen	2018 F4 Danish Championship
F4 Danish Championship	Teams: (Denmark) FSP	2018 F4 Danish Championship
F4 Danish Championship	Formula 5: (Denmark) Mads Hoe	2018 F4 Danish Championship
French F4 Championship	(Brazil) Caio Collet	2018 French F4 Championship
French F4 Championship	Junior: (France) Théo Pourchaire	2018 French F4 Championship
Italian F4 Championship	(Brazil) Enzo Fittipaldi	2018 Italian F4 Championship
Italian F4 Championship	Rookies: (Czech Republic) Petr Ptáček	2018 Italian F4 Championship
Italian F4 Championship	Teams: (Italy) Prema Powerteam	2018 Italian F4 Championship
F4 Japanese Championship	(Japan) Yuki Tsunoda	2018 F4 Japanese Championship
NACAM Formula 4 Championship	(Mexico) Moisés de la Vara	2017-18 NACAM Formula 4 Championship
SMP F4 Championship	(Finland) Konsta Lappalainen	2018 SMP F4 Championship
Spanish Formula 4 Championship	(Belgium) Amaury Cordeel	2018 F4 Spanish Championship
Spanish Formula 4 Championship	Teams: (Netherlands) MP Motorsport	2018 F4 Spanish Championship
Formula 4 South East Asia Championship (2017-18)	(China) Daniel Cao	2017-18 Formula 4 South East Asia Championship
Formula 4 South East Asia Championship (2018)	(France) Alessandro Ghiretti	2018 Formula 4 South East Asia Championship
Fórmula Academy Sudamericana	(Brazil) Juan Vieira	2018 Formula Academy Sudamericana season
Formula 4 UAE Championship	(Belgium) Charles Weerts	2017-18 Formula 4 UAE Championship
Formula 4 UAE Championship	Teams: (United Arab Emirates) Dragon Motopark F4	2017-18 Formula 4 UAE Championship
Formula 4 United States Championship	(United States) Dakota Dickerson	2018 Formula 4 United States Championship
JAF Japan Formula 4	East: (Japan) Makoto Kanai	2018 JAF Japan Formula 4
JAF Japan Formula 4	West: (Japan) Norio Kubo	2018 JAF Japan Formula 4
Formula Ford
Australian Formula Ford Series	(New Zealand) Hunter McElrea	2018 Australian Formula Ford Series
New Zealand Formula Ford Championship	(New Zealand) Callum Hedge	2017–18 New Zealand Formula Ford Championship
F1600 Championship Series	(United States) Dario Cangialosi	2018 F1600 Championship Series
Pacific F2000 Championship	(United States) Jason Reichert	2018 Pacific F2000 Championship
Toyo Tires F1600 Championship Series	(Canada) Kellen Ritter	2018 Toyo Tires F1600 Championship Series
U.S. F2000 National Championship	(United States) Kyle Kirkwood	2018 U.S. F2000 National Championship
U.S. F2000 National Championship	Teams: (United States) Pabst Racing	2018 U.S. F2000 National Championship
Formula Renault
Asian Formula Renault Series	(China) Daniel Cao	2018 Asian Formula Renault Series
Formula Renault Eurocup	(United Kingdom) Max Fewtrell	2018 Formula Renault Eurocup
Formula Renault Eurocup	Teams: (France) R-ace GP	2018 Formula Renault Eurocup
Formula Renault Eurocup	Rookies: (Denmark) Christian Lundgaard	2018 Formula Renault Eurocup
Formula Renault Northern European Cup	(Germany) Doureid Ghattas	2018 Formula Renault Northern European Cup
Formula Renault Northern European Cup	Teams: (France) R-ace GP	2018 Formula Renault Northern European Cup
Formula Renault 2.0 Argentina	(Argentina) Lucas Vicino	2018 Formula Renault 2.0 Argentina
V de V Challenge Monoplace	(Argentina) Nicolás Varrone	2018 V de V Challenge Monoplace
Other Junior Formulae
Chilean Formula Three Championship	(Chile) Lucas Bacigalupo	2018 Chilean Formula Three Championship

== Rallying ==
Series	Champion	refer
FIA World Rally Championship	(France) Sébastien Ogier	2018 FIA World Rally Championship
FIA World Rally Championship	Co-drivers: (France) Julien Ingrassia	2018 FIA World Rally Championship
FIA World Rally Championship	Manufacturers: (Japan) Toyota Gazoo Racing World Rally Team	2018 FIA World Rally Championship
FIA World Rally Championship-2	(Czech Republic) Jan Kopecký	2018 FIA World Rally Championship-2
FIA World Rally Championship-2	Co-drivers: (Czech Republic) Pavel Dresler	2018 FIA World Rally Championship-2
FIA World Rally Championship-2	Teams: (Czech Republic) Škoda Motorsport II	2018 FIA World Rally Championship-2
FIA World Rally Championship-3	(Italy) Enrico Brazzoli	2018 FIA World Rally Championship-3
FIA World Rally Championship-3	Co-drivers: (Italy) Luca Beltrame	2018 FIA World Rally Championship-3
FIA World Rally Championship-3	Teams: (Italy) ACI Team Italia	2018 FIA World Rally Championship-3
FIA Junior World Rally Championship	(Sweden) Emil Bergkvist	2018 FIA Junior World Rally Championship
FIA Junior World Rally Championship	Co-Driver: (Sweden) Johan Johansson	2018 FIA Junior World Rally Championship
FIA R-GT Cup	(France) Raphael Astier	2018 FIA R-GT Cup
Andros Trophy	Elite Pro: (France) Jean-Baptiste Dubourg	2017-18 Andros Trophy
Andros Trophy	Elite Pro and Elite Teams: (Belgium) Comtoyou Racing	2017-18 Andros Trophy
Andros Trophy	Elite: (France) Eddy Bénézet	2017-18 Andros Trophy
Andros Trophy	Électrique: (France) Aurélien Panis	2017-18 Andros Trophy
Andros Trophy	Électrique Teams: (France) Plastic'Up	2017-18 Andros Trophy
Andros Trophy	AMV Cup: (France) Sylvain Dabert	2017-18 Andros Trophy
African Rally Championship	(Kenya) Manvir Baryan	2018 African Rally Championship
African Rally Championship	Co-Drivers: (United Kingdom) Drew Sturrock	2018 African Rally Championship
Asia-Pacific Rally Championship	(Japan) Yuya Sumiyama	2018 Asia-Pacific Rally Championship
Asia-Pacific Rally Championship	Co-Driver: (Japan) Takahiro Yasui	2018 Asia-Pacific Rally Championship
Asia-Pacific Rally Championship	Manufacturers: (Czech Republic) Škoda	2018 Asia-Pacific Rally Championship
Australian Rally Championship	(Australia) Eli Evans	2018 Australian Rally Championship
Australian Rally Championship	Co-Drivers: (Australia) Ben Searcy	2018 Australian Rally Championship
British Rally Championship	(United Kingdom) Matt Edwards	2018 British Rally Championship
British Rally Championship	Co-Driver: (United Kingdom) Darren Garrod	2018 British Rally Championship
Canadian Rally Championship	(Canada) Karel Carré	2018 Canadian Rally Championship
Canadian Rally Championship	Co-Drivers: (Canada) Samuel Joyal	2018 Canadian Rally Championship
Central European Zone Rally Championship	Class 2: (Slovenia) Andras Hadik	2018 Central European Zone Rally Championship
Central European Zone Rally Championship	Production: (Poland) Slawomir Kurdys	2018 Central European Zone Rally Championship
Central European Zone Rally Championship	2WD: (Slovenia) Aleks Humar	2018 Central European Zone Rally Championship
Central European Zone Rally Championship	Historic: (Hungary) László Mekler	2018 Central European Zone Rally Championship
Codasur South American Rally Championship	(Paraguay) Gustavo Saba	2018 Codasur South American Rally Championship
Czech Rally Championship	(Czech Republic) Jan Kopecký	2018 Czech Rally Championship
Czech Rally Championship	Co-Drivers: (Czech Republic) Pavel Dresler	2018 Czech Rally Championship
Deutsche Rallye Meisterschaft	(Germany) Marijan Griebel	
Estonian Rally Championship	(Ukraine) Valeriy Gorban	2018 Estonian Rally Championship
Estonian Rally Championship	Co-Drivers: (Estonia) Sergei Larens	2018 Estonian Rally Championship
European Rally Championship	(Russia) Alexey Lukyanuk	2018 European Rally Championship
European Rally Championship	Co-drivers: (Russia) Alexey Arnautov	2018 European Rally Championship
European Rally Championship	ERC-2: (Hungary) Tibor Érdi	2018 European Rally Championship
European Rally Championship	ERC-2 Co-drivers: (Hungary) György Papp	2018 European Rally Championship
European Rally Championship	ERC-3: (Latvia) Mārtiņš Sesks	2018 European Rally Championship
European Rally Championship	ERC-2 Co-drivers: (Latvia) Renars Francis	2018 European Rally Championship
European Rally Championship	ERC Junior U28: (Russia) Nikolay Gryazin	2018 European Rally Championship
European Rally Championship	ERC Junior U27: (Latvia) Mārtiņš Sesks	2018 European Rally Championship
European Rally Championship	ERC Ladies Cup: (United Kingdom) Catie Munnings	2018 European Rally Championship
European Rally Championship	ERC Nations Cup: (Germany) ADAC Opel Rallye Junior Team	2018 European Rally Championship
French Rally Championship	(France) Yoann Bonato	
Hungarian Rally Championship	(Hungary) András Hadik	
Hungarian Rally Championship	Co-Drivers: (Hungary) Igor Bacigál	
Indian National Rally Championship	(India) Gaurav Gill	
Indian National Rally Championship	Co-Drivers: (India) Musa Sherif	
Italian Rally Championship	(Italy) Paolo Andreucci	
Italian Rally Championship	Co-Drivers: (Italy) Anna Andreussi	
Italian Rally Championship	Manufacturers: (United States) Ford	
Middle East Rally Championship	(Qatar) Nasser Al-Attiyah	
NACAM Rally Championship	(Mexico) Ricardo Triviño	2018 NACAM Rally Championship
NACAM Rally Championship	Co-Drivers: (Mexico) Marco Hernández	2018 NACAM Rally Championship
New Zealand Rally Championship	(New Zealand) Hayden Paddon	2018 New Zealand Rally Championship
New Zealand Rally Championship	Co-Drivers: (New Zealand) Tony Rawstorn	2018 New Zealand Rally Championship
Polish Rally Championship	(Poland) Grzegorz Grzyb	
Rally America	(United States) Dave Brown	2018 Rally America season
Romanian Rally Championship	(Romania) Simone Tempestini	
Scottish Rally Championship	(United Kingdom) Andrew Gallacher	2018 Scottish Rally Championship
Scottish Rally Championship	Co-Driver: (United Kingdom) Jane Nicol	2018 Scottish Rally Championship
Slovak Rally Championship	(Slovakia) Martin Koči	
Slovak Rally Championship	Co-Drivers: (Slovakia) Radovan Mozner	
South African National Rally Championship	(South Africa) Guy Botterill	
South African National Rally Championship	Co-Drivers: (South Africa) Simon Vacy-Lyle	
Spanish Rally Championship	(Spain) Miguel Ángel Fuster	
Spanish Rally Championship	Co-Drivers: (Spain) Ignacio Aviñó	

=== Rallycross ===
Series	Champion	refer
FIA World Rallycross Championship	(Sweden) Johan Kristoffersson	2018 FIA World Rallycross Championship
FIA World Rallycross Championship	Teams: PSRX Volkswagen Sweden	2018 FIA World Rallycross Championship
FIA World Rallycross Championship	RX2: (Sweden) Oliver Eriksson	2018 FIA World Rallycross Championship
FIA European Rallycross Championship	(Latvia) Reinis Nitišs	2018 FIA European Rallycross Championship
FIA European Rallycross Championship	Super1600: (Lithuania) Rokas Baciuška	2018 FIA European Rallycross Championship
FIA European Rallycross Championship	TouringCar: (Belgium) Steve Volders	2018 FIA European Rallycross Championship
Americas Rallycross Championship	(United States) Scott Speed	2018 Americas Rallycross Championship
Americas Rallycross Championship	ARX2: (United States) Conner Martell	2018 Americas Rallycross Championship
British Rallycross Championship	(United Kingdom) Mark Higgins	

== Sports car and GT ==
Series	Champion	refer
ADAC GT Masters	(France) Mathieu Jaminet (Germany) Robert Renauer	2018 ADAC GT Masters
ADAC GT Masters	Teams; (Germany) Mann-Filter Team HTP Motorsport	2018 ADAC GT Masters
ADAC GT Masters	Junior: (South Africa) Sheldon van der Linde	2018 ADAC GT Masters
ADAC GT Masters	Trophy: (Switzerland) Remo Lips	2018 ADAC GT Masters
Asian Le Mans Series	LMP2: (United Kingdom) Harrison Newey; LMP2: (Monaco) Stephane Richelmi; LMP2: (France) Thomas Laurent	2017–18 Asian Le Mans Series
Asian Le Mans Series	LMP2 Teams: (China) #8 Jackie Chan DC Racing X Jota	2017–18 Asian Le Mans Series
Asian Le Mans Series	LMP3: (United States) Guy Cosmo; LMP3: (United States) Patrick Byrne	2017–18 Asian Le Mans Series
Asian Le Mans Series	LMP3 Teams: (China) #6 Jackie Chan DC Racing X Jota	2017–18 Asian Le Mans Series
Asian Le Mans Series	GT: (Finland) Jesse Krohn; GT: (Taiwan) Jun-San Chen	2017–18 Asian Le Mans Series
Asian Le Mans Series	GT Teams: (Taiwan) #91 FIST-Team AAI	2017–18 Asian Le Mans Series
Asian Le Mans Series	GT-Am: (Italy) Massimiliano Wiser; GT-Am: (China) Weian Chen	2017–18 Asian Le Mans Series
Asian Le Mans Series	GT-Am Teams: (China) #66 TianShi Racing Team	2017–18 Asian Le Mans Series
Asian Le Mans Series	GT Cup: (New Zealand) Will Bamber; GT Cup: (New Zealand) Graeme Dowsett	2017–18 Asian Le Mans Series
Asian Le Mans Series	GT Cup Teams: (New Zealand) #77 Team NZ	2017–18 Asian Le Mans Series
Australian GT Championship	(Australia) Geoff Emery	2018 Australian GT Championship
Australian GT Championship	Endurance: (Australia) Max Twigg; Endurance: (Australia) Tony D'Alberto	2018 Australian GT Championship
British GT Championship	(United Kingdom) Jonathan Adam (United Kingdom) Flick Haigh	2018 British GT Championship
British GT Championship	Teams: (United Kingdom) TF Sport	2018 British GT Championship
British GT Championship	GT3 Pro-Am: (United Kingdom) Jonathan Adam; GT3 Pro-Am: (United Kingdom) Flick Haigh	2018 British GT Championship
British GT Championship	GT3 Silver: (United Kingdom) Struan Moore	2018 British GT Championship
British GT Championship	GT4: (United Kingdom) Jack Mitchell	2018 British GT Championship
British GT Championship	GT4 Teams: (United Kingdom) Century Motorsport	2018 British GT Championship
British GT Championship	GT4 Pro-Am: (United Kingdom) Nick Jones; GT4 Pro-Am: (United Kingdom) Scott Malvern	2018 British GT Championship
British GT Championship	GT4 Silver: (United Kingdom) Jack Mitchell	2018 British GT Championship
French GT4 Cup	(France) Fabien Michal (France) Grégory Guilvert	2018 French GT4 Cup
French GT4 Cup	Teams: (France) Saintéloc Racing	2018 French GT4 Cup
French GT4 Cup	Am: (France) Rodolphe Wallgren	2018 French GT4 Cup
French GT4 Cup	Am Teams: (France) AGS Events	2018 French GT4 Cup
Ginetta GT4 Supercup	(United Kingdom) Charlie Ladell	2018 Ginetta GT4 Supercup
Ginetta GT4 Supercup	Pro-Am; (United Kingdom) Michael Crees	2018 Ginetta GT4 Supercup
Ginetta Junior Championship	(United Kingdom) Adam Smalley	2018 Ginetta Junior Championship
Ginetta Junior Championship	Scholarship: (United Kingdom) James Taylor	2018 Ginetta Junior Championship
GT4 Central European Cup	(Netherlands) Rob Severs	2018 GT4 Central European Cup
GT4 Central European Cup	Teams: (Italy) Scuderia Villorba Corse	2018 GT4 Central European Cup
GT4 Central European Cup	Am: (Poland) Maciej Marcinkiewicz	2018 GT4 Central European Cup
GT4 European Series	(Netherlands) Milan Dontje (Denmark) Nicolaj Møller Madsen	2018 GT4 European Series
GT4 European Series	Teams: (Germany) Racing One	2018 GT4 European Series
GT4 European Series	Pro-Am Cup: (Germany) Markus Lungstrass	2018 GT4 European Series
GT4 European Series	Am Cup: (France) Niki Leutwiler	2018 GT4 European Series
International GT Open	(Denmark) Mikkel Mac	2018 International GT Open
International GT Open	Pro-Am: (Italy) Fabrizio Crestani; Pro-Am: (Portugal) Miguel Ramos	2018 International GT Open
International GT Open	Am: (Brazil) Giulio Borlenghi; Am: (Poland) Andrzej Lewandowski	2018 International GT Open
New Zealand Endurance Championship	(New Zealand) Simon Evans (New Zealand) Callum Quin	2018 New Zealand Endurance Championship
Pirelli World Challenge	(Finland) Toni Vilander	2018 Pirelli World Challenge
Pirelli World Challenge	GT Manufacturers: (Italy) Ferrari	2018 Pirelli World Challenge
Pirelli World Challenge	GTA: (Mexico) Martin Fuentes	2018 Pirelli World Challenge
Pirelli World Challenge	GTS: (United States) James Sofronas	2018 Pirelli World Challenge
Pirelli World Challenge	GTS Manufacturers: (United States) Panoz	2018 Pirelli World Challenge
Pirelli World Challenge	GTSA: (United States) Jeff Courtney	2018 Pirelli World Challenge
Pirelli World Challenge	TCR: (United States) Ryan Eversley	2018 Pirelli World Challenge
Pirelli World Challenge	TCR Manufacturers: (South Korea) Hyundai	2018 Pirelli World Challenge
Pirelli World Challenge	TCA: (United States) Tom O'Gorman	2018 Pirelli World Challenge
Pirelli World Challenge	TCA Manufacturers: (Japan) Subaru	2018 Pirelli World Challenge
Pirelli World Challenge	TC: (United States) Vesko Kozarov	2018 Pirelli World Challenge
Pirelli World Challenge	TC Manufacturers: (Germany) BMW	2018 Pirelli World Challenge
SprintX GT Championship Series	(Spain) Miguel Molina (Finland) Toni Vilander	2018 SprintX GT Championship Series
SprintX GT Championship Series	GT Pro-Am: (United States) Parker Chase; GT Pro-Am: (United States) Ryan Dalziel	2018 SprintX GT Championship Series
SprintX GT Championship Series	GT Am: (United States) Caesar Bacarella; GT Am: (Mexico) Martin Fuentes	2018 SprintX GT Championship Series
SprintX GT Championship Series	GTS: (United States) James Sofronas; GTS: (United States) Alex Welch	2018 SprintX GT Championship Series
SprintX GT Championship Series	GTS Am: (United States) Aurora Straus	2018 SprintX GT Championship Series
Toyota 86 Racing Series	(Australia) Tim Brook	2018 Toyota 86 Racing Series
Toyota Finance 86 Championship	(New Zealand) Jack Milligan	2017-18 Toyota Finance 86 Championship
WeatherTech SportsCar Championship	(United States) Eric Curran (Brazil) Felipe Nasr	2018 WeatherTech SportsCar Championship
WeatherTech SportsCar Championship	Teams: (United States) #31 Whelen Engineering Racing	2018 WeatherTech SportsCar Championship
WeatherTech SportsCar Championship	Manufacturers: (United States) Cadillac	2018 WeatherTech SportsCar Championship
WeatherTech SportsCar Championship	GT Le Mans: (Spain) Antonio García; GT Le Mans: (Denmark) Jan Magnussen	2018 WeatherTech SportsCar Championship
WeatherTech SportsCar Championship	GT Le Mans Teams: (United States) #3 Corvette Racing	2018 WeatherTech SportsCar Championship
WeatherTech SportsCar Championship	GT Le Mans Manufacturers: (United States) Ford	2018 WeatherTech SportsCar Championship
WeatherTech SportsCar Championship	GT Daytona: (United States) Bryan Sellers; GT Daytona: (United States) Madison Snow	2018 WeatherTech SportsCar Championship
WeatherTech SportsCar Championship	GT Daytona Teams: (United States) #48 Paul Miller Racing	2018 WeatherTech SportsCar Championship
WeatherTech SportsCar Championship	GT Daytona Manufacturers: (Italy) Lamborghini	2018 WeatherTech SportsCar Championship
Blancpain GT Series
Blancpain GT Series	(Italy) Raffaele Marciello	2018 Blancpain GT Series
Blancpain GT Series	Teams: (France) AKKA ASP	2018 Blancpain GT Series
Blancpain GT Series	Pro-Am: (Germany) Markus Winkelhock; Pro-Am: (France) Nyls Stievenart	2018 Blancpain GT Series
Blancpain GT Series	Pro-Am Teams: (France) Saintéloc Racing	2018 Blancpain GT Series
Blancpain GT Series	Silver Cup: (United Kingdom) Jack Manchester; Silver Cup: (Germany) Nico Bastian	2018 Blancpain GT Series
Blancpain GT Series	Am Cup: (Switzerland) Adrian Amstutz; Am Cup: (Russia) Leo Machitski	2018 Blancpain GT Series
Blancpain GT Series	Am Cup Teams: (United Kingdom) Barwell Motorsport	2018 Blancpain GT Series
Blancpain GT Series Asia	(Croatia) Martin Kodrić (Denmark) Dennis Lind	2018 Blancpain GT Series Asia
Blancpain GT Series Asia	Teams: (China) FFF Racing Team by ACM	2018 Blancpain GT Series Asia
Blancpain GT Series Asia	GT4: (Germany) Reinhold Renger	2018 Blancpain GT Series Asia
Blancpain GT Series Asia	GT4 Teams: (Japan) BMW Team Studie	2018 Blancpain GT Series Asia
Blancpain GT Series Asia	Silver Cup: (Croatia) Martin Kodrić; Silver Cup: (Denmark) Dennis Lind	2018 Blancpain GT Series Asia
Blancpain GT Series Asia	Pro-Am Cup: (Japan) Hiroshi Hamaguchi; Pro-Am Cup: (Italy) Marco Mapelli	2018 Blancpain GT Series Asia
Blancpain GT Series Asia	Am Cup: (Japan) Takuya Shirasaka; Am Cup: (Japan) Naoto Takeda	2018 Blancpain GT Series Asia
Blancpain GT Series Endurance Cup	(Italy) Raffaele Marciello	2018 Blancpain GT Series Endurance Cup
Blancpain GT Series Endurance Cup	Teams: (France) AKKA ASP	2018 Blancpain GT Series Endurance Cup
Blancpain GT Series Endurance Cup	Pro-Am: (United Kingdom) Lewis Williamson; Pro-Am: (United Kingdom) Chris Buncombe; Pro-Am: (United Kingdom) Nick Leventis	2018 Blancpain GT Series Endurance Cup
Blancpain GT Series Endurance Cup	Pro-Am Teams: (Switzerland) 961 Corse	2018 Blancpain GT Series Endurance Cup
Blancpain GT Series Endurance Cup	Silver Cup: (Canada) Mikaël Grenier; Silver Cup: (South Africa) Adrian Zaugg; Silver Cup: (Switzerland) Alex Fontana	2018 Blancpain GT Series Endurance Cup
Blancpain GT Series Endurance Cup	Am Cup: (Switzerland) Adrian Amstutz; Am Cup: (Russia) Leo Machitski	2018 Blancpain GT Series Endurance Cup
Blancpain GT Series Endurance Cup	Am Cup Teams: (United Kingdom) Barwell Motorsport	2018 Blancpain GT Series Endurance Cup
Blancpain GT Series Sprint Cup	(Italy) Raffaele Marciello (United Kingdom) Michael Meadows	2018 Blancpain GT Series Sprint Cup
Blancpain GT Series Sprint Cup	Teams: (Belgium) Belgian Audi Club Team WRT	2018 Blancpain GT Series Sprint Cup
Blancpain GT Series Sprint Cup	Silver Cup: (Germany) Nico Bastian; Silver Cup: (United Kingdom) Jack Manchester	2018 Blancpain GT Series Sprint Cup
Blancpain GT Series Sprint Cup	Pro-Am Cup: (France) Nyls Stievenart; Pro-Am Cup: (Germany) Markus Winkelhock	2018 Blancpain GT Series Sprint Cup
Blancpain GT Series Sprint Cup	Pro-Am Teams: (France) Saintéloc Racing	2018 Blancpain GT Series Sprint Cup
Blancpain GT Series Sprint Cup	Am Cup: (France) Pierre Feligioni; Am Cup: (France) Claude-Yves Gosselin	2018 Blancpain GT Series Sprint Cup
Blancpain GT Series Sprint Cup	Am Teams: (Belgium) Boutsen Ginion Racing	2018 Blancpain GT Series Sprint Cup
Blancpain GT Sports Club	(Saudi Arabia) Karim Ojjeh	2018 Blancpain GT Sports Club
Blancpain GT Sports Club	Titanium Cup: (Saudi Arabia) Karim Ojjeh	2018 Blancpain GT Sports Club
Blancpain GT Sports Club	Iron Cup: (United States) Stephen Earle	2018 Blancpain GT Sports Club
Porsche Supercup, Porsche Carrera Cup and GT3 Cup Challenge
Porsche Supercup	(Germany) Michael Ammermüller	2018 Porsche Supercup
Porsche Carrera Cup Australia	(New Zealand) Jaxon Evans	2018 Porsche Carrera Cup Australia
Porsche Carrera Cup Australia	Pro-Am: (Australia) Stephen Grove	2018 Porsche Carrera Cup Australia
Porsche Carrera Cup Deutschland	(Austria) Thomas Preining	2018 Porsche Carrera Cup Deutschland
Porsche Carrera Cup Deutschland	Rookies: (Luxembourg) Dylan Pereira	2018 Porsche Carrera Cup Deutschland
Porsche Carrera Cup Deutschland	Amateur: (Germany) Jörn Schmidt-Staade	2018 Porsche Carrera Cup Deutschland
Porsche Carrera Cup Great Britain	(Cyprus) Tio Ellinas	2018 Porsche Carrera Cup Great Britain
Porsche Carrera Cup Great Britain	Teams: (United Kingdom) JTR	2018 Porsche Carrera Cup Great Britain
Porsche Carrera Cup Great Britain	Pro-Am: (United Kingdom) Seb Perez	2018 Porsche Carrera Cup Great Britain
Porsche Carrera Cup Great Britain	Am: (United Kingdom) Peter Mangion	2018 Porsche Carrera Cup Great Britain
Porsche Carrera Cup Scandinavia	(Sweden) Lukas Sundahl	2018 Porsche Carrera Cup Scandinavia
Porsche Carrera Cup Scandinavia	Teams: (Sweden) Team Sundahl	2018 Porsche Carrera Cup Scandinavia
Porsche GT3 Cup Challenge Australia	(Australia) Simon Fallon	2018 Porsche GT3 Cup Challenge Australia
Porsche GT3 Cup Challenge Australia	Pro-Am: (Australia) Danny Stutterd	2018 Porsche GT3 Cup Challenge Australia
Porsche GT3 Cup Challenge Australia	Class B: (Australia) Christian Pancione	2018 Porsche GT3 Cup Challenge Australia
Pirelli Porsche Championship	(New Zealand) Paul Kelly	2017-18 Pirelli Porsche Championship
Ferrari Challenge
Finali Mondiali	Trofeo Pirelli Pro: (Denmark) Nicklas Nielsen; Trofeo Pirelli Pro-Am: (Liechtenstein) Fabienne Wohlwend; Coppa Shell Pro-Am: (Switzerland) Christophe Hurni; Coppa Shell Am: (Sweden) Ingvar Mattsson	2018 Finali Mondiali
Ferrari Challenge Europe	Trofeo Pirelli Pro: (Denmark) Nicklas Nielsen; Trofeo Pirelli Pro-Am: (United Kingdom) Chris Froggatt; Coppa Shell Pro-Am: (Switzerland) Christophe Hurni; Coppa Shell Am: (Turkey) Murat Cuhadaroğlu	2018 Ferrari Challenge Europe
Ferrari Challenge North America	Trofeo Pirelli Pro: (United States) Cooper MacNeil; Trofeo Pirelli Pro-Am: (United States) Ross Chouest; Coppa Shell Pro-Am: (United States) Thomas Tippl; Coppa Shell Am: (United States) John Megrue	2018 Ferrari Challenge North America
Ferrari Challenge Asia-Pacific	Trofeo Pirelli Pro: (Italy) Philippe Prette; Coppa Shell Pro-Am: (Lebanon) Tani Hanna; Coppa Shell Am: (New Zealand) David Dicker	2018 Ferrari Challenge Asia-Pacific

== Stock car racing ==
Series	Champion	refer
ARCA Racing Series	(United States) Sheldon Creed	2018 ARCA Racing Series
ARCA Racing Series	Manufacturers: (Japan) Toyota	2018 ARCA Racing Series
Stock Car Brasil	(Brazil) Daniel Serra	2018 Stock Car Brasil Championship
Stock Car Brasil	Teams: (Brazil) Eurofarma RC	2018 Stock Car Brasil Championship
Stock Car Light	(Brazil) Raphael Reis de Sá	2018 Stock Car Light season
Stock Car Light	Teams: (Brazil) W2 Racing	2018 Stock Car Light season
USAC Silver Crown Series	(United States) Kody Swanson	2018 USAC Silver Crown Series
USAC Silver Crown Series	Teams: DePalma Motorsports	2018 USAC Silver Crown Series
Turismo Carretera	(Argentina) Agustín Canapino	2018 Turismo Carretera Championship
NASCAR
Monster Energy NASCAR Cup Series	(United States) Joey Logano	2018 Monster Energy NASCAR Cup Series
Monster Energy NASCAR Cup Series	Manufacturers: (United States) Ford	2018 Monster Energy NASCAR Cup Series
NASCAR Xfinity Series	(United States) Tyler Reddick	2018 NASCAR Xfinity Series
NASCAR Xfinity Series	Manufacturers: (United States) Chevrolet	2018 NASCAR Xfinity Series
NASCAR Camping World Truck Series	(United States) Brett Moffitt	2018 NASCAR Camping World Truck Series
NASCAR Camping World Truck Series	Manufacturers: (United States) Chevrolet	2018 NASCAR Camping World Truck Series
NASCAR K&N Pro Series East	(United States) Tyler Ankrum	2018 NASCAR K&N Pro Series East
NASCAR K&N Pro Series East	Manufacturers: (Japan) Toyota	2018 NASCAR K&N Pro Series East
NASCAR K&N Pro Series West	(United States) Derek Thorn	2018 NASCAR K&N Pro Series West
NASCAR K&N Pro Series West	Manufacturers: (Japan) Toyota	2018 NASCAR K&N Pro Series West
NASCAR Pinty's Series	(Canada) Louis-Philippe Dumoulin	2018 NASCAR Pinty's Series
NASCAR Pinty's Series	Manufacturers: (United States) Dodge	2018 NASCAR Pinty's Series
NASCAR PEAK Mexico Series	(Mexico) Rubén García Jr.	2018 NASCAR PEAK Mexico Series
NASCAR Whelen Euro Series	(Israel) Alon Day	2018 NASCAR Whelen Euro Series
NASCAR Whelen Euro Series	Elite 2: (France) Ulysse Delsaux	2018 NASCAR Whelen Euro Series
NASCAR Whelen Modified Tour	(United States) Justin Bonsignore	2018 NASCAR Whelen Modified Tour

== Touring cars ==
Series	Champion	refer
Aussie Racing Cars	(Australia) Joel Heinrich	2018 Aussie Racing Car season
Brasileiro de Marcas	(Brazil) Vicente Orige	2018 Brasileiro de Marcas
Brasileiro de Marcas	Teams: (Brazil) JML Racing	2018 Brasileiro de Marcas
Brasileiro de Marcas	Manufacturers: (United States) Chevrolet	2018 Brasileiro de Marcas
British Touring Car Championship	(United Kingdom) Colin Turkington	2018 British Touring Car Championship
British Touring Car Championship	Teams: (United Kingdom) Team BMW	2018 British Touring Car Championship
British Touring Car Championship	Manufacturers / Constructors: (Germany) BMW	2018 British Touring Car Championship
British Touring Car Championship	Independent: (United Kingdom) Tom Ingram	2018 British Touring Car Championship
British Touring Car Championship	Independent Teams: (United Kingdom) Speedworks Motorsport	2018 British Touring Car Championship
British Touring Car Championship	Jack Sears Trophy: (United Kingdom) Dan Cammish	2018 British Touring Car Championship
Deutsche Tourenwagen Masters	(United Kingdom) Gary Paffett	2018 Deutsche Tourenwagen Masters
Deutsche Tourenwagen Masters	Teams: (Germany) Mercedes-AMG Motorsport Petronas	2018 Deutsche Tourenwagen Masters
Deutsche Tourenwagen Masters	Manufacturers: (Germany) Mercedes-Benz	2018 Deutsche Tourenwagen Masters
Mini Challenge UK	JCW: (United Kingdom) Ant Whorton-Eales	2018 Mini Challenge UK
Mini Challenge UK	Open: (United Kingdom) Will Fairclough	2018 Mini Challenge UK
Mini Challenge UK	Cooper Pro: (United Kingdom) Kyle Reid	2018 Mini Challenge UK
Mini Challenge UK	Cooper Am: (United Kingdom) Alex Nevill	2018 Mini Challenge UK
NZ Touring Cars Championship	(New Zealand) Andre Heimgartner	2017-18 NZ Touring Cars Championship
NZ Touring Cars Championship	Class Two: (New Zealand) Liam MacDonald	2017-18 NZ Touring Cars Championship
Renault Clio Cup United Kingdom	(United Kingdom) Paul Rivett	2018 Renault UK Clio Cup
Súper TC2000	(Argentina) Facundo Ardusso	2018 Súper TC2000
Súper TC2000	Teams: (Argentina) Renault Sport	2018 Súper TC2000
Súper TC2000	Manufacturers: (France) Renault	2018 Súper TC2000
Supercars Championship	(New Zealand) Scott McLaughlin	2018 Supercars Championship
Supercars Championship	Teams: (Australia) Triple Eight Race Engineering	2018 Supercars Championship
Supercars Championship	Manufacturers: (Australia) Holden	2018 Supercars Championship
Supercars Championship	Enduro Cup: (Australia) Craig Lowndes; Enduro Cup: (New Zealand) Steven Richards	2018 Supercars Championship
Super2 Series	(New Zealand) Chris Pither	2018 Super2 Series
Touring Car Masters	(Australia) Steven Johnson	2018 Touring Car Masters
V8 Touring Car National Series	(Australia) Tyler Everingham	2018 V8 Touring Car National Series
TCR Series
FIA World Touring Car Cup	(Italy) Gabriele Tarquini	2018 World Touring Car Cup
FIA World Touring Car Cup	Teams: (France) M Racing-YMR	2018 World Touring Car Cup
TCR Asia Series	(Germany) Luca Engstler	2018 TCR Asia Series
TCR Asia Series	Teams: (Germany) Liqui Moly Team Engstler	2018 TCR Asia Series
TCR Benelux Trophy	(France) Jean-Karl Vernay	2018 TCR Benelux Trophy
TCR Benelux Trophy	Teams: (Luxembourg) Leopard Lukoil Team WRT	2018 TCR Benelux Trophy
TCR Europe Series	(Spain) Mikel Azcona	2018 TCR Europe Series
TCR Europe Series	Teams: (Hong Kong) Hell Energy Racing with KCMG	2018 TCR Europe Series
ADAC TCR Germany Touring Car Championship	(Austria) Harald Proczyk	2018 ADAC TCR Germany Touring Car Championship
ADAC TCR Germany Touring Car Championship	Teams: (Austria) HP Racing International	2018 ADAC TCR Germany Touring Car Championship
TCR Baltic Trophy	(Lithuania) Ernesta Globytė	2018 TCR Baltic Trophy
TCR Baltic Trophy	Teams: (Lithuania) GSR Motorsport	2018 TCR Baltic Trophy
TCR Italy Touring Car Championship	(Italy) Salvatore Tavano	2018 TCR Italy Touring Car Championship
TCR Middle East Series	(Germany) Luca Engstler	2018 TCR Middle East Series
TCR Middle East Series	Teams: (Germany) Liqui Moly Team Engstler	2018 TCR Middle East Series
Russian Circuit Racing Series	(Russia) Dmitry Bragin	2018 Russian Circuit Racing Series
Russian Circuit Racing Series	Teams: Lukoil Racing Team	2018 Russian Circuit Racing Series
Russian Circuit Racing Series	Touring Light: (Russia) Grigoriy Burlutskiy	2018 Russian Circuit Racing Series
Russian Circuit Racing Series	Touring Light Teams: Carville Racing	2018 Russian Circuit Racing Series
Russian Circuit Racing Series	National: (Russia) Pavel Kalmanovich	2018 Russian Circuit Racing Series
Russian Circuit Racing Series	National Teams: AG Team	2018 Russian Circuit Racing Series
Russian Circuit Racing Series	Super Production: (Russia) Mikhail Mityaev	2018 Russian Circuit Racing Series
Russian Circuit Racing Series	Super Production Teams: LADA Sport Rosneft	2018 Russian Circuit Racing Series
Russian Circuit Racing Series	National Junior: (Russia) Irina Sidorkova	2018 Russian Circuit Racing Series
Russian Circuit Racing Series	National Junior Teams: Academy Rally	2018 Russian Circuit Racing Series
TCR Scandinavia Touring Car Championship	(Sweden) Johan Kristoffersson	2018 TCR Scandinavia Touring Car Championship
TCR Scandinavia Touring Car Championship	Teams: (Sweden) SEAT Dealer Team	2018 TCR Scandinavia Touring Car Championship
TCR Swiss Trophy	(Hungary) Attila Tassi	2018 TCR Swiss Trophy
TCR UK Touring Car Championship	(United Kingdom) Daniel Lloyd	2018 TCR UK Touring Car Championship
TCR UK Touring Car Championship	Teams: (Sweden) WestCoast Racing	2018 TCR UK Touring Car Championship

== Truck racing ==
Series	Champion	refer
Copa Truck	(Brazil) Roberval Andrade	2018 Copa Truck season
European Truck Racing Championship	(Germany) Jochen Hahn	2018 European Truck Racing Championship
European Truck Racing Championship	Teams: (Germany) Die Bullen von Iveco Magirus	2018 European Truck Racing Championship
European Truck Racing Championship	Grammer Truck Cup: (United Kingdom) Shane Brereton	2018 European Truck Racing Championship
New Zealand Super Truck Championship	(New Zealand) Alex Little	2017–18 New Zealand Super Truck Championship
NZ V8 Ute Racing Series	(New Zealand) Richard Moore	2017–18 NZ V8 Ute Racing Series
Stadium Super Trucks	(Australia) Matthew Brabham	2018 Stadium Super Trucks
SuperUtes Series	(Australia) Ryal Harris	2018 SuperUtes Series

== See also ==
- List of motorsport championships
