= 2017 American Canadian Tour =

The 2017 American Canadian Tour is the 31st season of the American Canadian Tour. The series began at Lee USA Speedway on April 8, and ends at Thompson Speedway Motorsports Park on October 14. Nick Sweet is the defending champion.

== Schedule ==
Date	Track	Name	Location	Laps	Winner	Car number
April 8–9	Lee USA Speedway	Governor's Cup 150	Lee, New Hampshire	150	Dillon Moltz	5CT
April 29–30	Thunder Road International SpeedBowl (Note: Postponed due to rain, will be run at later date.)	Merchants Bank 150	Barre, Vermont	150		
May 7	Devil's Bowl Speedway (Note: Postponed due to rain, will be run on May 20.)	Spring Green 117	West Haven, Vermont	117		
May 20	Devil's Bowl Speedway	Spring Green 117	West Haven, Vermont	117		
June 17	White Mountain Motorsports Park		North Woodstock, New Hampshire	150		
July 15	Seekonk Speedway		Seekonk, Massachusetts	100		
August 5	Beech Ridge Motor Speedway		Scarborough, Maine	100		
August 19	White Mountain Motorsports Park		North Woodstock, New Hampshire	100		
September 3	Thunder Road International SpeedBowl		Barre, Vermont	200		
September 10	Devil's Bowl Speedway		West Haven, Vermont	TBA		
September 23	New Hampshire Motor Speedway (Note: Non-official race.)	9th Annual Invitational	Loudon, New Hampshire	TBA		
October 14	Thompson Speedway Motorsports Park		Thompson, Connecticut	75		

== Driver roster ==
2017 driver roster
Number	Name	Hometown	Sponsor	Make
0NH	Miles Chipman	Nottingham, New Hampshire	Race Parts New Hampshire	Chevy
00NY	Steven Miller	Vergennes, Vermont	Miller Motorsports	
00VT	Mike Bailey	South Barre, Vermont	Bailey Motorsports	
04VT	Eric Badore	Milton, Vermont	A.H. Fence Co.	
1VT	Louis Hallstrom IV	Northfield, Vermont	Louis W. Hallstrom IV Motorsports	
2VT	Stephen Donahue (R)	Graniteville, Vermont	West View Meadows	Chevy
3VT	Ricky Roberts	Washington, Vermont	Roberts Motorsports	Chevy
4MA	William Wall	Shrewsbury, Massachusetts	Wall Trucking	Chevy
4VT	Chris Riendeau	Perkinsville, Vermont	Riendeau Motorsports	
5CT	Dillon Moltz	Waterford, Connecticut	RB Performance	Chevy
5QC	Patrick Cliche	Levis, Quebec	EZ Web Solution	Chevy
5VT	Bobby Therrien	Hinesburg, Vermont	Maplewood	Chevy
6QC	Simon Roussin	Quebec City	Prince-Edouard Performance	Chevy
6VT	George May	Barre, Vermont	Ennis-Flint	Chevy
7LA	Eric Gagnon (R)	Quebec City	Bernard MNJ	
7QC	Daniel Bergeron	Mirabel, Quebec	Bergeron Motorsports	
7VT	Mike Foster	Williston, Vermont	Foster Motorsports	
9NH	Kyle Welch	Lempster, New Hampshire	Peterboro Tool	Chevy
9QC	Mathieu Kingsbury (R)	Blainville, Quebec	Duroking Construction	Chevy
10VT	Josh Demers	Montpelier, Vermont	Demers Auto	Chevy
11NY	Josh Masterson	Charlotte, Vermont	Murray Masterson	Chevy
11QC	Claude Leclerc	Lanoraie, Quebec	Dimensions Portes Et Fenetres	Chevy
11VT	Terry Reil	East Barre, Vermont	Pro Fleet LLC	Ford
13QC	Patrick Boyer	Quebec City	Cuisine Therom Bois	Ford
13VT	Boomer Morris	Barre, Vermont	K. Bellavance Land Works & Hauling	Chevy
14VT	Phil Scott	Middlesex, Vermont	Scott Motorsports	Chevy
16VT	Scott Dragon	Milton, Vermont	Richard Green Trucking	Chevy
17MA	Eddie MacDonald	Rowley, Massachusetts	Hancock Electric	Chevy
17VT	Darrel Morin	Westford, Vermont	Grinnell Electric	Chevy
18QC	Gerald Beauchamp	Saint-Roch-de-l'Achigan, Quebec	Gerald Beauchamp Motorsports	Chevy
18VT	Jamie Fisher	Shelburne, Vermont	S.D. Ireland Concrete	Chevy
19QC	Dany Trepanier	Saint-Edouard, Quebec	JC-7 Signature	Ford
21NH	Oren Remick	Monroe, New Hampshire	Promis	Chevy
21QC	Jean-Francois Dery	Quebec City	Giguere Portes Fenetres	Toyota
22ME	Mark Norris	Benson, Vermont	Norris Motorsports	Chevy
22RI	Mark Jenison	Warwick, Rhode Island	Monro Tire & Brake	Chevy
25VT	David Whitcomb	Essex Junction, Vermont	Whitcomb Motorsports	
27VT	Kyle Pembroke	Montpelier, Vermont	Lens Auto Sales & Service	Chevy
28ME	Rowland Robinson Jr.	Steuben, Maine	Robinson Jr. Motorsports	Ford
29VT	Jason Allen	Northfield, Vermont	Allen Motorsports	
30NH	Rich Dubeau	Lebanon, New Hampshire	Upper Valley Equipment Rental	Toyota
31VT	Shawn Fleury	Middlesex, Vermont	Noyle Johnson Group	Chevy
34ME	Spencer Morse	Waterford, Maine	Lens Auto Sales & Service	Chevy
34QC	Claude Lepage	Lavaltrie, Quebec	Lepage Motorsports	
37VT	Scott Payea	Colchester, Vermont	Harrison Pedi-Mix	Dodge
38QC	Gaetan Gaudreault	Quebec City	Gaubeau Construction Inc.	Chevy
38VT	Tyler Cahoon	Saint Johnsbury, Vermont	Berlin Optical Expressions	Chevy
40VT	Eric Chase	Milton, Vermont	Chase Motorsports	Chevy
41QC	Jonathan Bouvrette	Blainville, Quebec	Moto Illimetee	Ford
42QC	Eric St-Gelais	Saint-Aimé-des-Lacs, Quebec	Honda Charlevoix	
42VT	Matt White	Northfield, Vermont	White's Heating	Chevy
44VT	Richard Lowrey III	Charlotte, Vermont	U-Lock-It Self Storage	Ford
48QC	Alex Labbe	Saint-Albert, Quebec	LARUE Industrial Snow Blower	Chevy
49NH	Matt Anderson	Andover, New Hampshire	WATTS	Chevy
54VT	Michael Ziter	Barre, Vermont	Jeffords Steel & Engineering	Chevy
55QC	Jean Bilodeau	Saint_Henri, Quebec	M Bilodeau Auto	Chevy
57QC	Carl Poulin (R)	East Broughton, Quebec	Solution Chem Co	Chevy
58VT	Jimmy Hebert	Williamstown, Vermont	Hebert Excavaton	Chevy
59QC	Jean-Pierre Ouimet	Terrebonne, Quebec	Ouimet Transport	Chevy
64VT	Christopher Pelkey	Graniteville, Vermont	Memorial Sandblast	Chevy
66VT	Jason Corliss (R)	Barre, Vermont	Burnett Scrap Metals LLC	Ford
68VT	Brooks Clark	Fayston, Vermont	A.W. Clark Builders	Chevy
72VT	Scott Coburn	Barre, Vermont	Coburn Motorsports	
77MA	James Linardy	Somerville, Massachusetts	Kayem Hot Dogs	Chevy
80QC	Donald Theetge	Boischatel, Quebec	St-Nicolas Mercedes Benz	Chevy
82MA	Mark Hudson	Norton, Massachusetts	MH Enterprises	Chevy
83QC	Martin Goulet Jr.	Saint-Calixte, Quebec	TGF Remorquage	Chevy
85VT	Trampas Demers	South Burlington, Vermont	Jiffy Mart	Ford
86VT	Marcel Gravel	Wolcott, Vermont	Lucky's Plumbing and Heating	Toyota
88VT	Nick Sweet	Barre, Vermont	Sweet Motorsports	
90QC	Jeremy Roy (R)	Napierville, Quebec	Entreposage Fantastik	Chevy
91CT	Jeff Hartwell	Putnam, Connecticut	Jeff Hartwell Motorsports	
91QC	Patrick Laperle	Saint-Denis-sur-Richelieu, Quebec	RTA Piere d'auto	Ford
93CT	Raymond Christian III (R)	Norwich, Connecticut	Crazy Horse Race Chassis	Chevy
99VT	Cody Blake	Barre, Vermont	NCFCU	Chevy

== 2017 ACT Invitational qualifiers ==
Number	Name	Race
5CT	Dillon Moltz	Governor's Cup 150

== Race results ==
=== Governor's Cup 150 ===
Finish	Start	Number	Name	Laps	Points	Payout
1	5	5CT	Dillon Moltz	150	125	$3,675
2	12	48QC	Alex Labbe	150	104	$1,845
3	2	41QC	Jonathan Bouvrette	150	83	$1,225
4	17	37VT	Scott Payea	150	100	$1,000
5	11	66VT	Jason Corliss	150	98	$1,275
6	21	80QC	Donald Theetge	150	71	$850
7	15	34ME	Spencer Morse	150	97	$800
8	14	17MA	Eddie MacDonald	150	95	$750
9	6	30NH	Rich Dubeau	149	93	$725
10	3	5VT	Bobby Therrien	149	88	$750
11	4	28ME	Rowland Robinson Jr	149	90	$830
12	9	19QC	Dany Trepanier	149	59	$685
13	1	58VT	Jimmy Hebert	149	89	$640
14	13	9NH	Kyle Welch	149	80	$620
15	22	0NH	Miles Chipman	149	78	$610
16	8	11NY	Josh Masterson	149	80	$600
17	20	78NH	Quinny Welch	149	49	$590
18	7	49NH	Matt Anderson	149	73	$580
19	16	93CT	Raymond Christian III	148	72	$570
20	29	11QC	Claude Leclerc	147	58	$560
21	27	54VT	Mike Ziter	147	71	$550
22	24	23NH	Glenn Marte	147	39	$540
23	10	1NH	Corey Mason	147	63	$530
24	25	9QC	Mathieu Kingsbury	147	35	$520
25	18	22RI	Mark Jenison	147	62	$500
26	23	21NH	Oren Remick	147	35	$400
27	26	77MA	Jimmy Linardy	38	60	$300
28	28	82MA	Mark Hudson	35	60	$300
29	19	16VT	Scott Dragon	17	60	$300

== Driver's championship ==
(key) Bold – Pole position awarded by time. * – Most laps led.

Pos	Driver	LEE	TRS	DBS	WMN	SEK	BRG	WMN	TRS	DBS	NHM	THO	Points
1	Dillon Moltz	**1***											125
2	Alex Labbe	2											104
3	Scott Payea	4											100
4	Jason Corliss	5											98
5	Spencer Morse	7											97
6	Eddie MacDonald	8											95
7	Rich Dubeau	9											93
8	Rowland Robinson Jr	11											90
9	Jimmy Hebert	13											89
10	Bobby Therrien	10											88
11	Jonathan Bouvrette	3											83
12	Kyle Welch	14											80
13	Josh Masterson	16											80
14	Miles Chipman	15											78
15	Matt Anderson	18											73
16	Raymond Christian III	19											72
17	Donald Theetge	6											71
18	Mike Ziter	21											71
19	Corey Mason	23											63
20	Mark Jenison	25											62
21	Jimmy Linardy	27											60
22	Mark Hudson	28											60
23	Scott Dragon	29											60
24	Dany Trepanier	12											59
25	Claude Leclerc	20											58
26	Quinny Welch	17											49
27	Glenn Marte	22											39
28	Mathieu Kingsbury	24											35
29	Oren Remick	26											35
Pos	Driver	LEE	TRS	DBS	WMN	SEK	BRG	WMN	TRS	DBS	NHM	THO	Points
