= 2017 European Talent Cup =

2017 European Talent Cup
| Previous: | none | Next: | 2018 |
Support series: FIM CEV Moto3 Junior World Championship; FIM CEV Moto2 European Championship

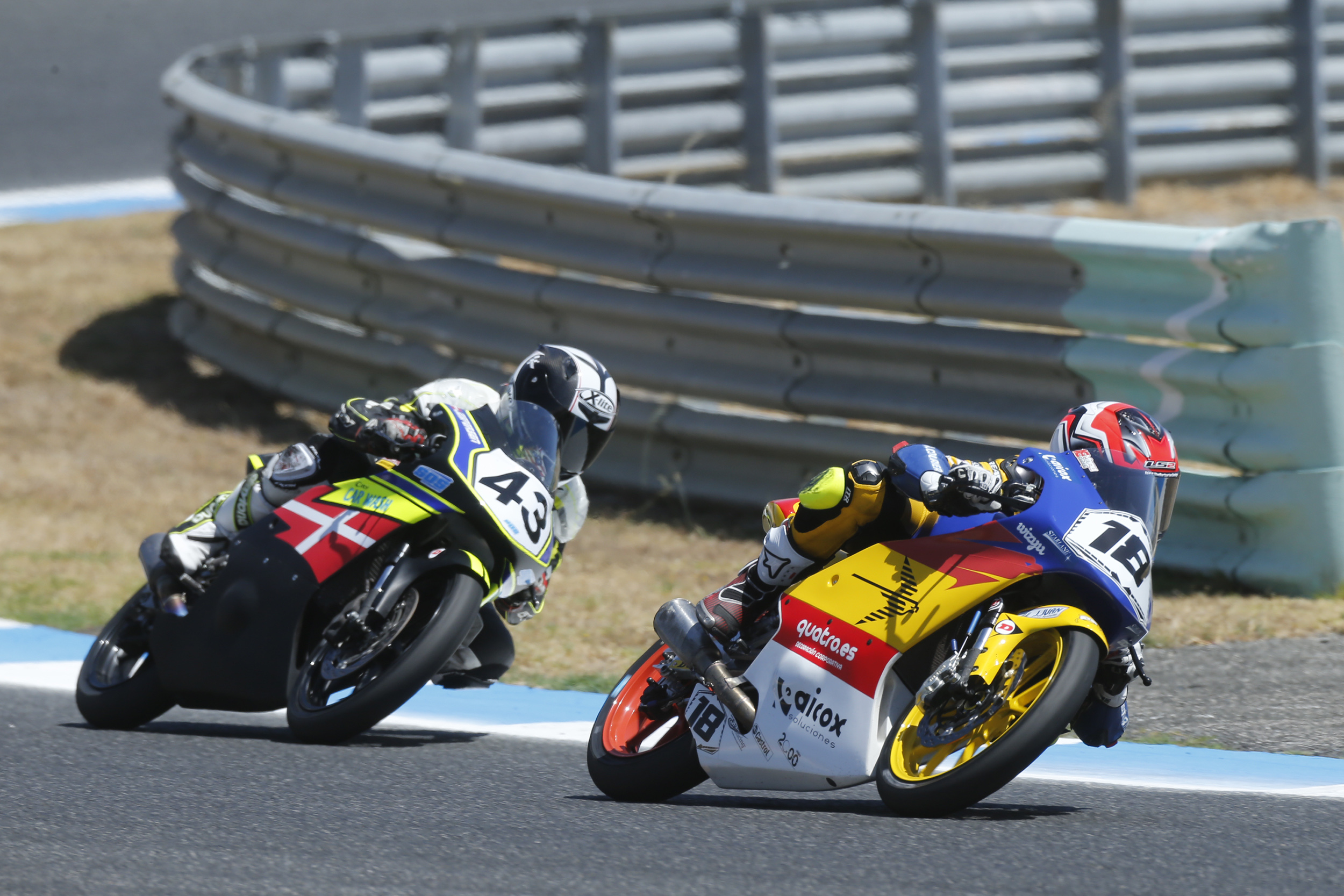
2017 champion Manuel González in front of Simon Jespersen

The 2017 European Talent Cup was the first season of the European Talent Cup. Participants born between 2000 and 2004 rode a Honda NSF250R.

== Calendar ==
The following races were scheduled to take place in 2017.

| Round | Date | Circuit | Pole position | Fastest lap | Race winner | Sources |
|---|---|---|---|---|---|---|
| 1 | 30 April | (Spain) Albacete | (Brazil) Meikon Kawakami | (Spain) Álex Toledo | (Denmark) Simon Jespersen | |
| 1 | 30 April | (Spain) Albacete | (Brazil) Meikon Kawakami | (Spain) Manuel González | (Spain) Andreas Pérez | |
| 2 | 18 June | (Spain) Catalunya | (Spain) Manuel González | (Spain) Francisco Gómez | (Spain) Iker García | |
| 3 | 9 July | (Spain) Valencia | (Spain) Francisco Gómez | (Spain) Manuel González | (Spain) Álex Toledo | |
| 4 | 23 July | (Portugal) Estoril | (Spain) Manuel González | (Spain) Francisco Gómez | (Spain) Eduard Melgar | |
| 4 | 23 July | (Portugal) Estoril | (Spain) Manuel González | (Spain) Alejandro Díez | (Spain) Manuel González | |
| 5 | 17 September | (Spain) Jerez | (Spain) Andreas Pérez | (Spain) Alejandro Díez | (Spain) Andreas Pérez | |
| 5 | 17 September | (Spain) Jerez | (Spain) Andreas Pérez | (Spain) Joan Uviña | (Spain) Francisco Gómez | |
| 6 | 8 October | (Spain) Aragón | (Spain) Manuel González | (Spain) Andreas Pérez | (Spain) Alejandro Díez | |
| 6 | 8 October | (Spain) Aragón | (Spain) Manuel González | (Spain) Álex Toledo | (Brazil) Meikon Kawakami | |
| 7 | 19 November | (Spain) Valencia | (Spain) Francisco Gómez | (Spain) Francisco Gómez | (Spain) Álex Toledo | |

== Entry list ==
| Team | Bike | No. | Rider | Rounds |
|---|---|---|---|---|
| (United Kingdom) Hart Racing | Honda | 2 | (United Kingdom) Jack Hart | All |
| (Spain) HMA Racing (Spain) Blumaq HMA Racing | Honda | 4 | (Portugal) Kiko Martinho | 4 |
| (Spain) HMA Racing (Spain) Blumaq HMA Racing | Honda | 24 | (France) Matthieu Grégorio | All |
| (Spain) HMA Racing (Spain) Blumaq HMA Racing | Honda | 26 | (Spain) Miguel Parra | All |
| (Spain) HMA Racing (Spain) Blumaq HMA Racing | Honda | 53 | (Czech Republic) Petr Svoboda | 6 |
| (Spain) HMA Racing (Spain) Blumaq HMA Racing | Honda | 74 | (Japan) Daijiro Sako | 2–3, 6–7 |
| (Spain) HMA Racing (Spain) Blumaq HMA Racing | Honda | 99 | (Spain) Carlos Tatay | 5 |
| (Spain) Grupo Machado (Spain) Grupo Machado–Came | Honda | 4 | (Portugal) Kiko Martinho | 7 |
| (Spain) Grupo Machado (Spain) Grupo Machado–Came | Honda | 19 | (Spain) Víctor Rodríguez | 7 |
| (Spain) Grupo Machado (Spain) Grupo Machado–Came | Honda | 23 | (Spain) Joan Uviña | 5–7 |
| (Spain) Grupo Machado (Spain) Grupo Machado–Came | Honda | 25 | (Spain) Eduard Melgar | 1–5 |
| (Spain) Grupo Machado (Spain) Grupo Machado–Came | Honda | 47 | (Spain) Ferran Hernández | 2–6 |
| (Spain) Reale Avintia Academy | Honda | 7 | (Belgium) Barry Baltus | 7 |
| (Spain) Reale Avintia Academy | Honda | 40 | (Spain) José Suárez | All |
| (Spain) Reale Avintia Academy | Honda | 61 | (Spain) Iker García | All |
| (Spain) Reale Avintia Academy | Honda | 77 | (Spain) Andreas Pérez | All |
| (Spain) Halcourier Racing (Spain) Halcourier MS Racing | Honda | 8 | (Spain) Iker Vera | 6–7 |
| (Spain) Halcourier Racing (Spain) Halcourier MS Racing | Honda | 18 | (Spain) Manuel González | All |
| (Spain) Halcourier Racing (Spain) Halcourier MS Racing | Honda | 71 | (Spain) Faustino Cañero | 1, 3 |
| (Spain) Team Larresport (Spain) Larresport | Honda | 9 | (Spain) Francisco Gómez | All |
| (Spain) Team Larresport (Spain) Larresport | Honda | 45 | (Spain) Xavier Artigas | 7 |
| (Spain) H43 Team Nobby | Honda | 12 | (Finland) Peetu Paavilainen | 2–7 |
| (Spain) H43 Team Nobby | Honda | 44 | (Spain) Adrián Fernández | 6–7 |
| (Spain) Team Stratos (Spain) Stratos Racing Team | Honda | 14 | (Spain) María Bellot | 3 |
| (Spain) Team Stratos (Spain) Stratos Racing Team | Honda | 15 | (Spain) Luis Verdugo | 5–7 |
| (Spain) Team Stratos (Spain) Stratos Racing Team | Honda | 23 | (Spain) Joan Uviña | 1–2, 4 |
| (Spain) Team Stratos (Spain) Stratos Racing Team | Honda | 36 | (Spain) Beatriz Neila | 2–7 |
| (Spain) Team Stratos (Spain) Stratos Racing Team | Honda | 44 | (Spain) Adrián Fernández | 4–5 |
| (Spain) Team Stratos (Spain) Stratos Racing Team | Honda | 81 | (Spain) Ángel Heredia | 6–7 |
| (Spain) FAU55 Racing | Honda | 16 | (United Kingdom) Jamie Davis | All |
| (Sweden) Samantha Johansson Racing | Honda | 20 | (Sweden) Samantha Johansson | 1 |
| TFC Racing | Honda | 21 | (France) Vincent Falcone | All |
| (Italy) Bierreti | Honda | 22 | (Italy) Stefano Cristin | All |
| Team Honda Impala | Honda | 27 | (Spain) Alejandro Díez | All |
| Team Honda Impala | Honda | 31 | (France) Aurel Nyul-Verlaque | All |
| Wilson Racing | Honda | 30 | (United Kingdom) Max Cook | 7 |
| Wilson Racing | Honda | 56 | (United Kingdom) Charlie Atkins | 7 |
| Igax Team | Honda | 33 | (Czech Republic) Filip Řeháček | 2–7 |
| (Spain) Cuna de Campeones | Honda | 34 | (Spain) Pedro Acosta | 7 |
| (Spain) Cuna de Campeones | Honda | 55 | (Spain) Álex Toledo | All |
| HDRacing | Honda | 37 | (Netherlands) Rick Dunnik | 2 |
| (Spain) Team SPN Racing | Honda | 41 | (El Salvador) Kevin Olmedo | 1 |
| (Denmark) Team Jespersen | Honda | 43 | (Denmark) Simon Jespersen | All |
| ETG Racing | Honda | 50 | (Czech Republic) Ondřej Vostatek | All |
| (United Kingdom) CJ Racing | Honda | 57 | (United Kingdom) Callum Blackwell | 1–4, 6 |
| (Netherlands) 4Holland Racing | Honda | 64 | (Netherlands) Colin Velthuizen | All |
| (Sweden) Lukasracing | Honda | 70 | (Sweden) Lukas Wendeborn | 3, 5–7 |
| JG Road Racing | Honda | 75 | (Andorra) Joaquim Galí | 6–7 |
| (Spain) XTECH (Spain) 42Motorsport | Honda | 80 | (Spain) Víctor Alonso | All |
| (Spain) PlayStation Laglisse Academy | Honda | 83 | (Brazil) Meikon Kawakami | All |

== Championship standings ==
| Pos. | Rider | Bike | ALB (Spain) | | CAT (Spain) | VAL (Spain) | EST (Portugal) | | JER (Spain) | | ARA (Spain) | | VAL (Spain) | Pts |
|---|---|---|---|---|---|---|---|---|---|---|---|---|---|---|
| 1 | (Spain) Manuel González | Honda | 3 | 2 | **3** | Ret | **2** | **1** | 7 | 7 | **4** | **5** | 5 | 150 |
| 2 | (Spain) Álex Toledo | Honda | 2 | 4 | 10 | 1 | 13 | 8 | 2 | Ret | 8 | Ret | 1 | 128 |
| 3 | (Brazil) Meikon Kawakami | Honda | **4** | **6** | 11 | Ret | 5 | 3 | 6 | 4 | 3 | 1 | 8 | 127 |
| 4 | (Spain) Andreas Pérez | Honda | Ret | 1 | 2 | 5 | DNS | Ret | **1** | **Ret** | 7 | 2 | 3 | 126 |
| 5 | (Denmark) Simon Jespersen | Honda | 1 | 5 | Ret | 6 | 6 | 2 | 5 | 5 | DNS | 6 | 6 | 118 |
| 6 | (Spain) Alejandro Díez | Honda | 10 | 10 | 7 | 3 | 4 | 4 | Ret | 8 | 1 | 8 | Ret | 104 |
| 7 | (Spain) Miguel Parra | Honda | 7 | 7 | 6 | 2 | 7 | 6 | 4 | 9 | 6 | 10 | Ret | 103 |
| 8 | (Spain) Francisco Gómez | Honda | 6 | 8 | 9 | **Ret** | 3 | 7 | 8 | 1 | Ret | 3 | **17** | 99 |
| 9 | (Spain) Eduard Melgar | Honda | 9 | 9 | 5 | 4 | 1 | 5 | 10 | 10 | | | | 86 |
| 10 | (Spain) Joan Uviña | Honda | 5 | 3 | Ret | | 12 | 10 | 9 | 2 | 2 | Ret | Ret | 84 |
| 11 | (Finland) Peetu Paavilainen | Honda | | | 4 | Ret | 8 | Ret | 3 | 6 | 10 | 13 | 7 | 65 |
| 12 | (Czech Republic) Ondřej Vostatek | Honda | 14 | 14 | 8 | 8 | 15 | 11 | 14 | 13 | DNS | 7 | 10 | 46 |
| 13 | (France) Matthieu Grégorio | Honda | 8 | 13 | 19 | 11 | 16 | 12 | 12 | 14 | 5 | 9 | 15 | 45 |
| 14 | (United Kingdom) Jamie Davis | Honda | 11 | 11 | 13 | Ret | 10 | Ret | 18 | 15 | 11 | 4 | 12 | 42 |
| 15 | (Spain) Iker García | Honda | 15 | 17 | 1 | Ret | 9 | Ret | Ret | Ret | Ret | 15 | 16 | 34 |
| 16 | (France) Vincent Falcone | Honda | 16 | Ret | 12 | 9 | 11 | 9 | 15 | Ret | 13 | 14 | 11 | 34 |
| 17 | (Spain) Adrián Fernández | Honda | | | | | 17 | 13 | 13 | 11 | Ret | 12 | 4 | 28 |
| 18 | (Spain) Ferran Hernández | Honda | | | 14 | 7 | 14 | 14 | 11 | 16 | 9 | Ret | | 27 |
| 19 | (Spain) Víctor Rodríguez | Honda | | | | | | | | | | | 2 | 20 |
| 20 | (Spain) Carlos Tatay | Honda | | | | | | | Ret | 3 | | | | 16 |
| 21 | (Spain) Beatriz Neila | Honda | | | 20 | 10 | 19 | 15 | 16 | 18 | Ret | 11 | Ret | 12 |
| 22 | (Italy) Stefano Cristin | Honda | 13 | 15 | 16 | 14 | 18 | Ret | 18 | 12 | 14 | 20 | 20 | 12 |
| 23 | (United Kingdom) Max Cook | Honda | | | | | | | | | | | 9 | 7 |
| 24 | (France) Aurel Nyul-Verlaque | Honda | 18 | 18 | 15 | 12 | 20 | 16 | 22 | 22 | 19 | 22 | 23 | 5 |
| 25 | (Spain) Víctor Alonso | Honda | 21 | 21 | Ret | 15 | DNS | DNS | 20 | 20 | 12 | 16 | 18 | 5 |
| 26 | (Spain) Faustino Cañero | Honda | Ret | 12 | | DNS | | | | | | | | 4 |
| 27 | (Netherlands) Colin Velthuizen | Honda | 12 | 16 | DNS | DNS | 21 | 17 | Ret | 21 | 16 | 19 | 22 | 4 |
| 28 | (Spain) Xavier Artigas | Honda | | | | | | | | | | | 13 | 3 |
| 29 | (United Kingdom) Callum Blackwell | Honda | 19 | 20 | 17 | 13 | DNS | DNS | | | Ret | 26 | | 3 |
| 30 | (Belgium) Barry Baltus | Honda | | | | | | | | | | | 14 | 2 |
| 31 | (Spain) Luis Verdugo | Honda | | | | | | | 17 | 17 | 15 | 17 | 19 | 1 |
| | (United Kingdom) Jack Hart | Honda | 20 | Ret | Ret | 16 | 22 | Ret | 24 | Ret | 21 | Ret | 26 | 0 |
| | (Spain) José Suárez | Honda | 17 | 19 | Ret | 17 | DNS | 18 | 23 | 23 | 20 | 25 | 28 | 0 |
| | (Spain) Ángel Heredia | Honda | | | | | | | | | 17 | 21 | 21 | 0 |
| | (Sweden) Lukas Wendeborn | Honda | | | | Ret | | | 21 | 19 | 18 | 23 | 24 | 0 |
| | (Czech Republic) Petr Svoboda | Honda | | | | | | | | | DNS | 18 | | 0 |
| | (Netherlands) Rick Dunnik | Honda | | | 18 | | | | | | | | | 0 |
| | (Portugal) Kiko Martinho | Honda | | | | | 23 | 19 | | | | | 31 | 0 |
| | (Sweden) Samantha Johansson | Honda | 22 | 22 | | | | | | | | | | 0 |
| | (Czech Republic) Filip Řeháček | Honda | | | DNS | Ret | DNS | DNS | 25 | 24 | 22 | Ret | 29 | 0 |
| | (Spain) Iker Vera | Honda | | | | | | | | | 23 | 24 | 30 | 0 |
| | (Andorra) Joaquim Galí | Honda | | | | | | | | | 24 | 27 | DNQ | 0 |
| | (United Kingdom) Charlie Atkins | Honda | | | | | | | | | | | 25 | 0 |
| | (Japan) Daijiro Sako | Honda | | | Ret | Ret | | | | | Ret | Ret | 27 | 0 |
| | (El Salvador) Kevin Olmedo | Honda | Ret | DNS | | | | | | | | | | 0 |
| | (Spain) Pedro Acosta | Honda | | | | | | | | | | | Ret | 0 |
| | (Spain) María Bellot | Honda | | | | Ret | | | | | | | | 0 |
| Pos. | Rider | Bike | ALB (Spain) | | CAT (Spain) | VAL (Spain) | EST (Portugal) | | JER (Spain) | | ARA (Spain) | | VAL (Spain) | Pts |

| Colour | Result |
|---|---|
| Gold | Winner |
| Silver | Second place |
| Bronze | Third place |
| Green | Points classification |
| Blue | Non-points classification |
| Blue | Non-classified finish (NC) |
| Purple | Retired, not classified (Ret) |
| Red | Did not qualify (DNQ) |
| Red | Did not pre-qualify (DNPQ) |
| Black | Disqualified (DSQ) |
| White | Did not start (DNS) |
| White | Withdrew (WD) |
| White | Race cancelled (C) |
| Blank | Did not practice (DNP) |
| Blank | Did not arrive (DNA) |
| Blank | Excluded (EX) |

**Bold** – Pole position
Italics – Fastest lap
