= Oval Superstars Tour =

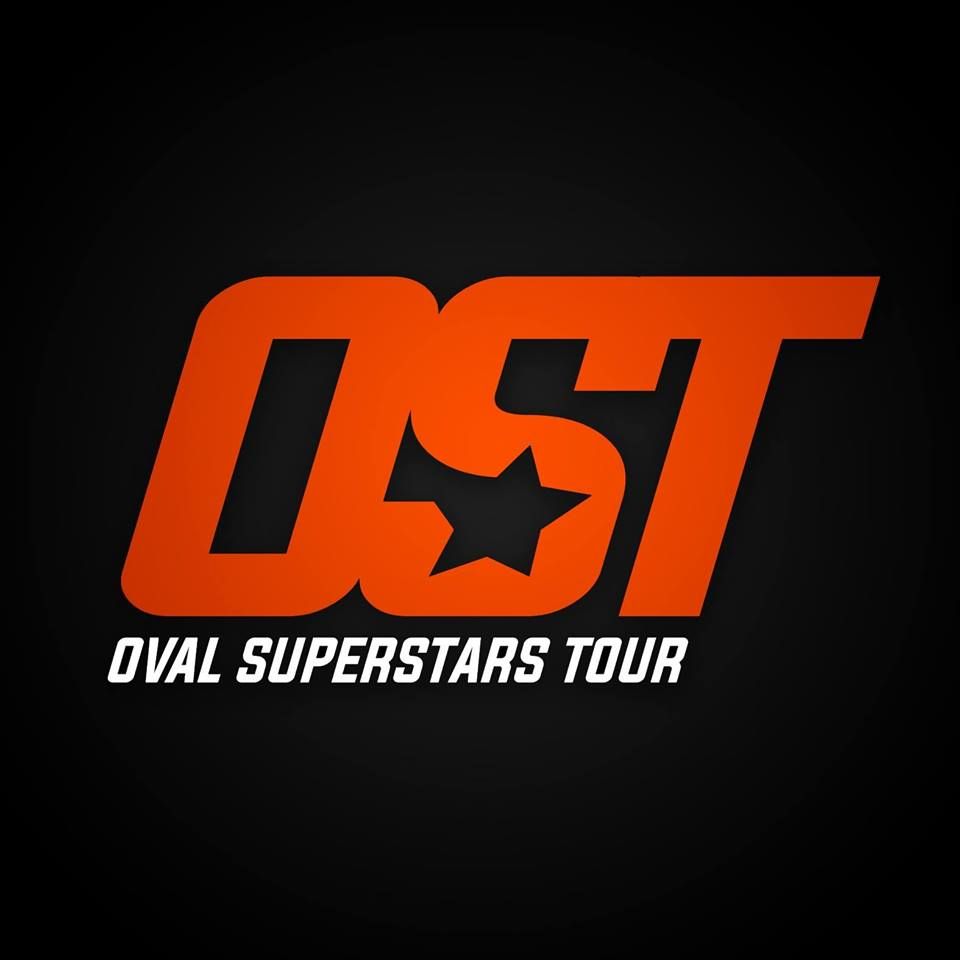
- Category: Dirt track racing
- Country: New Zealand
- Inaugural season: 2013-14
- Tyre suppliers: Hoosier & American Racer
- Drivers' champion: (New Zealand) Shane Dewar
- Teams' champion: (New Zealand) Dewtec Motorsport
- Official website: http://www.ovalsuperstars.co.nz

The Oval Superstars Tour (also known as OST) is a New Zealand based dirt track racing series, with championship rounds held throughout the North Island. Founded in 2013, the tour has grown to become a consistent fixture on the New Zealand Speedway calendar.

Heading into its eighth season in 2020–21, the tour had five different champions in five years, before Shane Dewar went back to back in the last two tours.

== Origins ==
The proposal for a national series for the Minisprint class of Speedway in New Zealand was originally conceived at the end of the 2012–13 season. There was an obvious need for a more organised calendar of events for the class in order to promote it further. The drivers, then, supported the idea and soon the concept of what could be achieved was in circulation. The following season the Oval Superstars Tour was launched, staging five events throughout the North Island.

== Sporting regulations ==
The OST is run at venues licensed by Speedway New Zealand, the major governing body of Speedway in NZ.

=== Race day format ===
In most cases, an OST event consists of the field of cars being split into three even groups. There are three qualifying heats to sort the grid for the Main Event. In each heat, two groups will take part, with the grids ordered to give all drivers a fair chance across the night. As an example, Heat One is Group 1 & 2, Heat Two is Group 1 & 3 & Heat Three is Group 2 & 3. Drivers receive grid points for the race results, with first place taking 24, second 23, third 22 and so on.

After qualification, driver's grids for the Main Event are determined by their grid points, with the highest points scorers starting at the front. Main Events are usually 20 laps in distance, except for the tour's annual premier event—the Windy City Showdown, which is competed for over 30 laps.

=== Championship points system ===
Drivers will earn championship points in heat races if they finish inside the top 10 positions, or in the Main Event if they finished inside the top 12. All drivers arriving at an event also receive 15 bonus points regardless of finishing position.

1. Heat points: 1st: 15, 2nd: 12, 3rd: 10, 4th: 8, 5th: 6, 6th: 5, 7th: 4, 8th: 3, 9th: 2, 10th: 1
2. Main Event points: 1st: 25, 2nd: 18, 3rd: 15, 4th: 12, 5th: 10, 6th: 8, 7th: 6, 8th: 5, 9th: 5, 10th: 3, 11th: 2, 12th: 1

== Cars ==
The Oval Superstars Tour currently includes the Minisprint class.

== Records ==
=== Champions ===
Season
Season	Winner	Race No.	Chassis & Engine	Second Place	Third Place
2020–21	(New Zealand) Elliot Heron	72h	Breka - Toyota	(New Zealand) Cameron Hurley	(New Zealand) Dylan Smith
2019–20	(New Zealand) Shane Dewar	1NZ	Hyper - Toyota	(New Zealand) Elliot Heron	(New Zealand) Dylan Smith
2018–19	(New Zealand) Shane Dewar	2NZ	Hyper - Toyota	(New Zealand) Ben Vaughan	(New Zealand) Christian Hermansen
2017–18	(New Zealand) Karl McGill	93p	Terminator - Toyota	(New Zealand) Shane Dewar	(New Zealand) Lydia Dickinson
2016–17	(New Zealand) Christian Hermansen	1NZ	Terminator - Toyota	(New Zealand) Jade Barnett	(New Zealand) Dean Cooper
2015–16	(New Zealand) Dean Cooper	2NZ	Breka - Toyota	(New Zealand) Ben Vaughan	(New Zealand) Brittany Riddick
2014–15	(New Zealand) Jade Barnett	37k	Barnett - Nissan	(New Zealand) Ben Vaughan	(New Zealand) Dean Cooper
2013–14	(New Zealand) Cameron Hurley	82s	Cool - Nissan	(New Zealand) Shane Simpson	(New Zealand) Sean Rice

== Oval Superstars Tour Wins ==
All figures correct end of 2019–20 season.

Key
**Bold**	Oval Superstars Tour Champion

OST Main Event Winners
Rank	Country	Driver	Wins	Active
1	New Zealand	**Christian Hermansen**	12	2013–19
2	New Zealand	**Jade Barnett**	5	2013–18
3	New Zealand	**Shane Dewar (2)**	3	2013-
3	New Zealand	**Dean Cooper**	3	2014–18
5	New Zealand	Ben Vaughan	2	2013-
5	New Zealand	Jamie Larsen	2	2013–17
5	New Zealand	Shaun Dickie	2	2013-
5	New Zealand	**Karl McGill**	2	2013–19
5	New Zealand	Lydia Dickinson	2	2017–19
10	New Zealand	Sean Rice	1	2013–14
10	New Zealand	Stephen Buys	1	2013-14
10	New Zealand	Elliot Heron	1	2018-

== Oval Superstars Minisprint Hall of Fame ==
Year	Person	Notes
2017	Shaun Cooke (Hamilton)	5x New Zealand Minisprint Champion
2019	Declan Roe (Levin)	OST National Rep, former NZ#2 Minisprint

== Awards and nominations ==
Year	Award	Category	Result
2017	New Zealand Speedway Awards	Individual Event of the Year	Finalist
2016	New Zealand Speedway Awards	Series of the Year	Finalist
2016	New Zealand Speedway Awards	Article of the Year	Finalist
2014	New Zealand Speedway Awards	Website of the Year	Finalist
