= List of 2013 motorsport champions =

2013 motorsport champions
Previous: 2012	Next: 2014

This list of 2013 motorsport champions is a list of national or international auto racing series with championships decided by the points or positions earned by a driver from multiple races where the season was completed during the 2013 calendar year.

== Dirt oval racing ==
Series	Champion	refer
Lucas Oil Late Model Dirt Series	(United States) Jimmy Owens	
United States Auto Club	Silver Crown: (United States) Bobby East	
United States Auto Club	Sprint Car: (United States) Bryan Clauson	
United States Auto Club	Midget (Dirt): (United States) Christopher Bell	
United States Auto Club	Midget (Pavement): (United States) Darren Hagen	
World of Outlaws Late Model Series	(United States) Josh Richards	
World of Outlaws Sprint Car Series	(United States) Daryn Pittman	
World of Outlaws Sprint Car Series	Teams: (United States) Kasey Kahne Racing	

== Drag racing ==
Series	Champion	Refer
NHRA Mello Yello Drag Racing Series	Top Fuel: (United States) Shawn Langdon	2013 NHRA Mello Yello Drag Racing Series
NHRA Mello Yello Drag Racing Series	Funny Car: (United States) John Force	2013 NHRA Mello Yello Drag Racing Series
NHRA Mello Yello Drag Racing Series	Pro Stock: (United States) Jeg Coughlin Jr.	2013 NHRA Mello Yello Drag Racing Series
NHRA Mello Yello Drag Racing Series	Pro Stock Motorcycle: (United States) Matt Smith	2013 NHRA Mello Yello Drag Racing Series
European Drag Racing Championship	Top Fuel: (Norway) Thomas Nataas	
European Drag Racing Championship	Pro Stock Car: (Sweden) Jimmy Ålund	
European Drag Racing Championship	Pro Stock Modified: (Sweden) Michael Gullqvist	

== Drifting ==
Series	Champion	Refer
British Drift Championship	(United Kingdom) Jay Greene	2013 British Drift Championship
British Drift Championship	Super Pro: (United Kingdom) Michael Marshall	2013 British Drift Championship
British Drift Championship	Semi-Pro: (United Kingdom) Matt Samuel	2013 British Drift Championship
D1 Grand Prix	(Japan) Masato Kawabata	2013 D1 Grand Prix series
D1 Grand Prix	D1SL: (Japan) Yusuke Kitaoka	2013 D1 Grand Prix series
D1NZ	(New Zealand) Daniel Woolhouse	2012–13 D1NZ season
D1NZ	Pro-Sport: (New Zealand) Darren Kelly	2012–13 D1NZ season
Drift Allstars	(Finland) Juha Rintanen	2013 Drift Allstars
Formula D	(United States) Michael Essa	2013 Formula D season
Formula D	Manufacturers: (Japan) Lexus	2013 Formula D season
Formula D	Tire Cup: (South Korea) Hankook	2013 Formula D season
Formula D Asia	(Japan) Daigo Saito	2013 Formula D Asia season

== Karting ==
Series	Driver	Season article
CIK-FIA Karting World Championship	KF: (United Kingdom) Tom Joyner	
CIK-FIA Karting World Championship	KFJ: (Italy) Alessio Lorandi	
CIK-FIA Karting World Championship	KZ: (Netherlands) Max Verstappen	
CIK-FIA Karting World Championship	KZ2: (France) Dorian Boccolacci	
CIK-FIA Karting Academy Trophy	(Belgium) Maxime Potty	2013 CIK-FIA Karting Academy Trophy
CIK-FIA Karting European Championship	KF: (Netherlands) Max Verstappen	
CIK-FIA Karting European Championship	KZ: (Netherlands) Max Verstappen	
CIK-FIA Karting European Championship	KF-J: (United Kingdom) Lando Norris	
CIK-FIA Karting European Championship	KZ2: (Norway) Emil Antonsen	
WSK Euro Series	KZ1: (Netherlands) Max Verstappen	
WSK Euro Series	KZ2: (Italy) Riccardo Negro	
WSK Euro Series	KF: (France) Dorian Boccolacci	
WSK Euro Series	KFJ: (United Kingdom) Lando Norris	
WSK Euro Series	60 Mini: (Spain) Eliseo Martinez	
Rotax Max Challenge	DD2: (Lithuania) Simas Juodvirsis	
Rotax Max Challenge	DD2 Masters: (South Africa) Cristiano Morgado	
Rotax Max Challenge	MAX: (United Kingdom) Oliver Hodgson	
Rotax Max Challenge	Junior: (United States) Juan Manuel Correa	
Rotax Max Challenge	Nations Cup: United States	

== Motorcycle racing ==
Series	Rider	refer
MotoGP World Championship	(Spain) Marc Márquez	2013 MotoGP World Championship
MotoGP World Championship	Teams: (Japan) Repsol Honda Team	2013 MotoGP World Championship
MotoGP World Championship	Constructors: (Japan) Honda	2013 MotoGP World Championship
Moto2 World Championship	(Spain) Pol Espargaró	2013 Moto2 World Championship
Moto2 World Championship	Teams: (Spain) Tuenti HP 40	2013 Moto2 World Championship
Moto2 World Championship	Constructors: (Germany) Kalex	2013 Moto2 World Championship
Moto3 World Championship	(Spain) Maverick Viñales	2013 Moto3 World Championship
Moto3 World Championship	Teams: (Spain) Estrella Galicia 0,0	2013 Moto3 World Championship
Moto3 World Championship	Constructors: (Austria) KTM	2013 Moto3 World Championship
Superbike World Championship	(United Kingdom) Tom Sykes	2013 Superbike World Championship
Superbike World Championship	Teams: (Italy) Aprilia Racing Team	2013 Superbike World Championship
Superbike World Championship	Manufacturers: (Italy) Aprilia	2013 Superbike World Championship
Supersport World Championship	(United Kingdom) Sam Lowes	2013 Supersport World Championship
Supersport World Championship	Teams: Mahi Racing Team India	2013 Supersport World Championship
Supersport World Championship	Manufacturers: (Japan) Kawasaki	2013 Supersport World Championship
Australian Superbike Championship	(Australia) Wayne Maxwell	

== Open wheel racing ==
Series	Champion	refer
FIA Formula One World Championship	(Germany) Sebastian Vettel	2013 Formula One World Championship
FIA Formula One World Championship	Constructors: (Austria) Red Bull-Renault	2013 Formula One World Championship
GP2 Series	(Switzerland) Fabio Leimer	2013 GP2 Series
GP2 Series	Teams: (Russia) Russian Time	2013 GP2 Series
GP3 Series	(Russia) Daniil Kvyat	2013 GP3 Series
GP3 Series	Teams: (France) ART Grand Prix	2013 GP3 Series
IndyCar Series	(New Zealand) Scott Dixon	2013 IndyCar Series season
IndyCar Series	Manufacturers: (United States) Chevrolet	2013 IndyCar Series season
IndyCar Series	Rookie: (France) Tristan Vautier	2013 IndyCar Series season
Super Formula	(Japan) Naoki Yamamoto	2013 Super Formula season
Super Formula	Teams: (Japan) Petronas Team TOM'S	2013 Super Formula season
Firestone Indy Lights	(United States) Sage Karam	2013 Indy Lights season
Firestone Indy Lights	Teams: (United States) Sam Schmidt Motorsports	2013 Indy Lights season
Auto GP	(Italy) Vittorio Ghirelli	2013 Auto GP season
Auto GP	U21 Trophy: (Italy) Vittorio Ghirelli	2013 Auto GP season
Auto GP	Teams: (United Kingdom) Super Nova International	2013 Auto GP season
Toyota Racing Series	(New Zealand) Nick Cassidy	2013 Toyota Racing Series
Pro Mazda Championship	(Australia) Matthew Brabham	2013 Pro Mazda Championship season
Formula Challenge Japan	(Japan) Kenta Yamashita	2013 Formula Challenge Japan
Formula Volkswagen South Africa Championship	(South Africa) Robert Wolk	2013 Formula Volkswagen South Africa Championship
FIA Masters Historic Formula One Championship	Fittipaldi/Stewart: (United States) John Delane	2013 FIA Masters Historic Formula One Championship
FIA Masters Historic Formula One Championship	Head/Lauda: (United Kingdom) Greg Thornton	2013 FIA Masters Historic Formula One Championship
ADAC Formel Masters	(Belgium) Alessio Picariello	2013 ADAC Formel Masters
ADAC Formel Masters	Teams: (Germany) ADAC Berlin-Brandenburg e.V.	2013 ADAC Formel Masters
Formula Masters China	(Australia) Aidan Wright	2013 Formula Masters China season
Formula Masters China	Teams: (Malaysia) Meritus GP	2013 Formula Masters China season
Formula Masters China	Chinese: (China) Pu Jun Jin	2013 Formula Masters China season
BOSS GP Series	(Luxembourg) Gary Hauser	2013 BOSS GP Series
BOSS GP Series	Teams: (Luxembourg) Racing Experience	2013 BOSS GP Series
BOSS GP Series	Formula: (Luxembourg) Gary Hauser	2013 BOSS GP Series
BOSS GP Series	Masters: (Germany) Hans Laub	2013 BOSS GP Series
JAF Japan Formula 4	East: (Japan) Kenta Yamashita	2013 JAF Japan Formula 4
JAF Japan Formula 4	West: (Japan) Shintarō Kawabata	2013 JAF Japan Formula 4
MRF Challenge Formula 2000	(United States) Conor Daly	2012–13 MRF Challenge Formula 2000 Championship
BRDC Formula 4 Championship	(United Kingdom) Jake Hughes	2013 BRDC Formula 4 Championship season
Formula Three
FIA Formula 3 European Championship	(Italy) Raffaele Marciello	2013 FIA Formula 3 European Championship
FIA Formula 3 European Championship	Teams: (Italy) Prema Powerteam	2013 FIA Formula 3 European Championship
Australian Drivers' Championship	(Australia) Tim Macrow	2013 Australian Drivers' Championship
British Formula 3 Championship	(United Kingdom) Jordan King	2013 British Formula 3 season
British Formula 3 Championship	National: (China) Sun Zheng	2013 British Formula 3 season
German Formula Three Championship	(Germany) Marvin Kirchhöfer	2013 German Formula Three season
German Formula Three Championship	Trophy: (Germany) Sebastian Balthasar	2013 German Formula Three season
German Formula Three Championship	Rookie: (Germany) Marvin Kirchhöfer	2013 German Formula Three season
German Formula Three Championship	Teams: (Germany) Lotus	2013 German Formula Three season
German Formula Three Championship	DMSB: (Germany) Marvin Kirchhöfer	2013 German Formula Three season
All-Japan Formula Three Championship	(Japan) Yuichi Nakayama	2013 Japanese Formula 3 Championship
All-Japan Formula Three Championship	Teams: (Japan) TOM'S	2013 Japanese Formula 3 Championship
All-Japan Formula Three Championship	National: (Japan) Mitsunori Takaboshi	2013 Japanese Formula 3 Championship
MotorSport Vision Formula Three Cup	(United Kingdom) Alex Craven	2013 MotorSport Vision Formula Three Cup
MotorSport Vision Formula Three Cup	Teams: (United Kingdom) Mark Bailey Racing	2013 MotorSport Vision Formula Three Cup
MotorSport Vision Formula Three Cup	Cup: (United Kingdom) Alex Craven	2013 MotorSport Vision Formula Three Cup
MotorSport Vision Formula Three Cup	Trophy: (United Kingdom) Dave Karaskas	2013 MotorSport Vision Formula Three Cup
European F3 Open Championship	(United Arab Emirates) Ed Jones	2013 European F3 Open season
European F3 Open Championship	Copa: (Slovakia) Richard Gonda	2013 European F3 Open season
European F3 Open Championship	Teams: (Italy) RP Motorsport	2013 European F3 Open season
Formula 3 Sudamericana	Class A: (Brazil) Felipe Guimarães	2013 Formula 3 Sudamericana season
Formula 3 Sudamericana	Class B: (Argentina) Bruno Etman	2013 Formula 3 Sudamericana season
Formula Renault
Formula Renault 3.5 Series	(Denmark) Kevin Magnussen	2013 Formula Renault 3.5 Series season
Formula Renault 3.5 Series	Teams: (France) DAMS	2013 Formula Renault 3.5 Series season
Eurocup Formula Renault 2.0	(France) Pierre Gasly	2013 Eurocup Formula Renault 2.0 season
Eurocup Formula Renault 2.0	Teams: (France) Tech 1 Racing	2013 Eurocup Formula Renault 2.0 season
Formula Renault 2.0 Alps	(Italy) Antonio Fuoco	2013 Formula Renault 2.0 Alps season
Formula Renault 2.0 Alps	Teams: (Italy) Prema Powerteam	2013 Formula Renault 2.0 Alps season
Formula Renault 2.0 Alps	Junior: (Italy) Antonio Fuoco	2013 Formula Renault 2.0 Alps season
Formula Renault 2.0 Northern European Cup	(United Kingdom) Matt Parry	2013 Formula Renault 2.0 NEC season
Protyre Formula Renault Championship	(United Kingdom) Chris Middlehurst	2013 Protyre Formula Renault Championship
Protyre Formula Renault Championship	Autumn Cup: (United Kingdom) Ben Barnicoat	2013 Protyre Formula Renault Championship
French F4 Championship	(France) Anthoine Hubert	2013 French F4 Championship season
Formula Renault 1.6 NEC	(Netherlands) Roy Geerts	2013 Formula Renault 1.6 NEC season
Asian Formula Renault Challenge	International: (Colombia) Julio Acosta	2013 Asian Formula Renault Series
Asian Formula Renault Challenge	Asian: (Taiwan) Jason Kang	2013 Asian Formula Renault Series
Asian Formula Renault Challenge	Master: (Hong Kong) Leo Wong	2013 Asian Formula Renault Series
Asian Formula Renault Challenge	International Teams: (China) Champ Motorsport	2013 Asian Formula Renault Series
Asian Formula Renault Challenge	Asian Teams: (Taiwan) KRC Racing Team	2013 Asian Formula Renault Series
Asian Formula Renault Challenge	Master Teams: (Macau) Asia Racing Team	2013 Asian Formula Renault Series
Formula Renault 2.0 Argentina	(Argentina) Julián Santero	2013 Formula Renault 2.0 Argentina
V de V Challenge Monoplace	(France) John Filippi	2013 V de V Challenge Monoplace
Formula Abarth
Formula Abarth	(Italy) Alessio Rovera	2013 Formula Abarth season
Formula Abarth	Trophy: (Russia) Sergey Trofimov	2013 Formula Abarth season
Formula Abarth	Rookie: (Italy) Alessio Rovera	2013 Formula Abarth season
Formula Abarth	Teams: (Italy) Cram Motorsport	2013 Formula Abarth season
Formula Russia	(Russia) Stanislav Burmistrov	
Formula Ford
Australian Formula Ford Championship	(Australia) Anton de Pasquale	2013 Australian Formula Ford Championship
British Formula Ford Championship	(United Kingdom) Dan Cammish	2013 British Formula Ford season
F2000 Championship Series	(United States) Tim Minor	2013 F2000 Championship Series season
Pacific F2000 Championship	(United States) Bob Negron	2013 Pacific F2000 Championship
U.S. F2000 National Championship	(Canada) Scott Hargrove	2013 U.S. F2000 National Championship
U.S. F2000 National Championship	National Class: (United States) Scott Rettich	2013 U.S. F2000 National Championship
U.S. F2000 Winterfest	(United States) Neil Alberico	2013 U.S. F2000 Winterfest
F1600 Championship Series	(United States) Jake Eidson	2013 F1600 Championship Series season
New Zealand Formula Ford Championship	(New Zealand) James Munro	2012–13 New Zealand Formula Ford Championship
Scottish Formula Ford Championship	(United Kingdom) Stuart Thorburn	
Toyo Tires F1600 Championship Series	(United States) Jack Mitchell Jr.	2013 Toyo Tires F1600 Championship Series

== Rallying ==
Series	Champion(s)	refer
World Rally Championship	(France) Sébastien Ogier	2013 World Rally Championship
World Rally Championship	Co-Drivers: (France) Julien Ingrassia	2013 World Rally Championship
World Rally Championship	Manufacturers: (Germany) Volkswagen	2013 World Rally Championship
European Rally Championship	(Czech Republic) Jan Kopecký	2013 European Rally Championship
European Rally Championship	Co-Drivers: (Czech Republic) Pavel Dresler	2013 European Rally Championship
World Rally Championship-2	(Poland) Robert Kubica	2013 World Rally Championship-2
World Rally Championship-2	Co-Drivers: (Poland) Maciej Baran	2013 World Rally Championship-2
World Rally Championship-3	(France) Sébastien Chardonnet	2013 World Rally Championship-3
World Rally Championship-3	Co-Drivers: (France) Thibault de la Haye	2013 World Rally Championship-3
Junior World Rally Championship	(Sweden) Pontus Tidemand	2013 Junior World Rally Championship
Junior World Rally Championship	Co-Drivers: (Norway) Ola Fløene	2013 Junior World Rally Championship
African Rally Championship	(Zambia) Jassy Singh	2013 African Rally Championship
African Rally Championship	Co-Drivers: (Botswana) David Sihoka	2013 African Rally Championship
Asia-Pacific Rally Championship	(India) Gaurav Gill	2013 Asia-Pacific Rally Championship
Asia-Pacific Rally Championship	Co-Drivers: (Australia) Glenn MacNeall	2013 Asia-Pacific Rally Championship
Central European Zone Rally Championship	Class 2: (Hungary) Norbert Herczig	2013 Central European Zone Rally Championship
Central European Zone Rally Championship	Production: (Slovenia) Asja Zupanc	2013 Central European Zone Rally Championship
Central European Zone Rally Championship	2WD: (Slovenia) Aleks Humar	2013 Central European Zone Rally Championship
Central European Zone Rally Championship	Historic: (Hungary) Ferenc Wirtmann	2013 Central European Zone Rally Championship
Codasur South American Rally Championship	(Paraguay) Gustavo Saba	2013 Codasur South American Rally Championship
Codasur South American Rally Championship	Co-Drivers: (Paraguay) Víctor Aguilera	2013 Codasur South American Rally Championship
Czech Rally Championship	(Czech Republic) Václav Pech	2013 Czech Rally Championship
Czech Rally Championship	Co-Drivers: (Czech Republic) Petr Uhel	2013 Czech Rally Championship
Deutsche Rallye Meisterschaft	(Germany) Georg Berlandy	
Estonian Rally Championship	(Estonia) Georg Gross	2013 Estonian Rally Championship
Estonian Rally Championship	Co-Drivers: (Estonia) Raigo Mõlder	2013 Estonian Rally Championship
French Rally Championship	(France) Julien Maurin	
Hungarian Rally Championship	(Hungary) Miklós Kazár	
Hungarian Rally Championship	Co-Drivers: (Hungary) Tamás Szőke	
Indian National Rally Championship	(India) Amittrajit Ghosh	
Indian National Rally Championship	Co-Drivers: (India) Ashwin Naik	
Italian Rally Championship	(Italy) Umberto Scandola	
Italian Rally Championship	Co-Drivers: (Italy) Guido D'Amore	
Italian Rally Championship	Manufacturers: (France) Peugeot	
Middle East Rally Championship	(Qatar) Nasser Al-Attiyah	2013 Middle East Rally Championship
Middle East Rally Championship	Co-Drivers: (Italy) Giovanni Bernacchini	2013 Middle East Rally Championship
NACAM Rally Championship	(Mexico) Ricardo Triviño	2013 NACAM Rally Championship
NACAM Rally Championship	Co-Drivers: (Mexico) Marco Hernández	2013 NACAM Rally Championship
ADAC Opel Rallye Cup	(Germany) Markus Fahrner	
ADAC Opel Rallye Cup	Co-Drivers: (Germany) Michael Wenzel	
Australian Rally Championship	(Australia) Eli Evans	2013 Australian Rally Championship
Australian Rally Championship	Co-Drivers: (Australia) Glen Weston	2013 Australian Rally Championship
British Rally Championship	(Finland) Jukka Korhonen	2013 British Rally Championship
British Rally Championship	Co-Drivers: (Finland) Marko Salminen	2013 British Rally Championship
Canadian Rally Championship	(Canada) Antoine L'Estage	2013 Canadian Rally Championship
Canadian Rally Championship	Co-Drivers: (Canada) Nathalie Richard	2013 Canadian Rally Championship
Deutsche Rallye Meisterschaft	(Germany) Georg Berlandy	
Deutsche Rallye Meisterschaft	Co-Drivers: (Germany) Peter Schaaf	
New Zealand Rally Championship	(New Zealand) Hayden Paddon	2013 New Zealand Rally Championship
New Zealand Rally Championship	Co-Drivers: (New Zealand) John Kennard	2013 New Zealand Rally Championship
Polish Rally Championship	(Poland) Kajetan Kajetanowicz	
Rally America	(United Kingdom) David Higgins	2013 Rally America season
Rally America	Co-Drivers: (United Kingdom) Craig Drew	2013 Rally America season
Romanian Rally Championship	(France) François Delecour	
Scottish Rally Championship	(United Kingdom) David Bogie	2013 Scottish Rally Championship
Scottish Rally Championship	Co-Drivers: (United Kingdom) Kevin Rae	2013 Scottish Rally Championship
Slovak Rally Championship	(Poland) Grzegorz Grzyb	
Slovak Rally Championship	Co-Drivers: (Poland) Robert Hundla	
South African National Rally Championship	(South Africa) Mark Cronje	
South African National Rally Championship	Co-Drivers: (South Africa) Robin Houghton	
South African National Rally Championship	Manufacturers: (Japan) Toyota	
Spanish Rally Championship	(Spain) Luis Monzón	
Spanish Rally Championship	Co-Drivers: (Spain) José Déniz	

=== Rallycross ===
Series	Champion(s)	refer
FIA European Rallycross Championship	SuperCars: (Russia) Timur Timerzyanov	2013 European Rallycross Championship
FIA European Rallycross Championship	Super1600s: (Latvia) Reinis Nitišs	2013 European Rallycross Championship
FIA European Rallycross Championship	TouringCars: (Republic of Ireland) Derek Tohill	2013 European Rallycross Championship
Global RallyCross Championship	(Finland) Toomas Heikkinen	2013 Global RallyCross Championship
Global RallyCross Championship	Manufacturers: (United States) Ford	2013 Global RallyCross Championship
British Rallycross Championship	(United Kingdom) Julian Godfrey	

== Sports car and GT ==
Series	Champion(s)	refer
FIA World Endurance Championship	(France) Loïc Duval (Denmark) Tom Kristensen (United Kingdom) Allan McNish	2013 FIA World Endurance Championship
FIA World Endurance Championship	GT: (Italy) Gianmaria Bruni	2013 FIA World Endurance Championship
FIA World Endurance Championship	LMP2: (Belgium) Bertrand Baguette (Mexico) Ricardo González (United Kingdom) Martin Plowman	2013 FIA World Endurance Championship
FIA World Endurance Championship	LMGTE Am Drivers: (United Kingdom) Jamie Campbell-Walter (United Kingdom) Stuart Hall	2013 FIA World Endurance Championship
FIA World Endurance Championship	Manufacturers: (Germany) Audi	2013 FIA World Endurance Championship
FIA World Endurance Championship	GT Manufacturers: (Italy) Ferrari	2013 FIA World Endurance Championship
FIA World Endurance Championship	LMP1 Teams: (Switzerland) Rebellion Racing	2013 FIA World Endurance Championship
FIA World Endurance Championship	LMP2 Teams: (France) OAK Racing	2013 FIA World Endurance Championship
FIA World Endurance Championship	LMGTE Pro Teams: (Italy) AF Corse	2013 FIA World Endurance Championship
FIA World Endurance Championship	LMGTE AM Teams: (United States) 8 Star Motorsports	2013 FIA World Endurance Championship
American Le Mans Series	LMP1: (Germany) Klaus Graf (Germany) Lucas Luhr	2013 American Le Mans Series season
American Le Mans Series	LMP2: (United States) Scott Tucker	2013 American Le Mans Series season
American Le Mans Series	LMPC: (United States) Mike Guasch	2013 American Le Mans Series season
American Le Mans Series	GT: (Spain) Antonio García (Denmark) Jan Magnussen	2013 American Le Mans Series season
American Le Mans Series	GTC: (Netherlands) Jeroen Bleekemolen (United States) Cooper MacNeil	2013 American Le Mans Series season
British GT Championship	GT3: (United Kingdom) Andrew Howard	2013 British GT Championship
British GT Championship	GT4: (United Kingdom) Rick Parfitt Jr. GT4: (United Kingdom) Ryan Ratcliffe	2013 British GT Championship
British GT Championship	GTC: (United Kingdom) Andy Schulz; GTC: (United Kingdom) Paul Bailey	2013 British GT Championship
European Le Mans Series	LMP2: (France) Nelson Panciatici (France) Pierre Ragues	2013 European Le Mans Series season
European Le Mans Series	LMPC: (France) Paul-Loup Chatin (France) Gary Hirsch	2013 European Le Mans Series season
European Le Mans Series	GTE: (Republic of Ireland) Matt Griffin (United Kingdom) Johnny Mowlem	2013 European Le Mans Series season
European Le Mans Series	GTC: (Italy) Fabio Babini (Russia) Kirill Ladygin (Russia) Viktor Shaitar	2013 European Le Mans Series season
European Le Mans Series	LMP2 Teams: (France) Signatech Alpine	2013 European Le Mans Series season
European Le Mans Series	LMPC Teams: (France) Team Endurance Challenge	2013 European Le Mans Series season
European Le Mans Series	GTE Teams: (United Kingdom) RAM Racing	2013 European Le Mans Series season
European Le Mans Series	GTC Teams: (Russia) SMP Racing	2013 European Le Mans Series season
Asian Le Mans Series	LMP2: (United States) David Cheng	2013 Asian Le Mans Series season
Asian Le Mans Series	GTE: (Japan) Akira Iida (Japan) Shogo Mitsuyama (Japan) Naoki Yokomizo	2013 Asian Le Mans Series season
Asian Le Mans Series	GTC: (Italy) Andrea Bertolini (Italy) Michele Rugolo (Australia) Steve Wyatt	2013 Asian Le Mans Series season
Asian Le Mans Series	LMP2 Teams: (France) OAK Racing	2013 Asian Le Mans Series season
Asian Le Mans Series	GTE Teams: (Japan) Team Taisan Ken Endless	2013 Asian Le Mans Series season
Asian Le Mans Series	GTC Teams: (Italy) AF Corse	2013 Asian Le Mans Series season
Blancpain Endurance Series	Pro: (Germany) Maximilian Buhk	2013 Blancpain Endurance Series season
Blancpain Endurance Series	Pro-Am: (Spain) Lucas Ordóñez	2013 Blancpain Endurance Series season
Blancpain Endurance Series	Gentlemen: (France) Jean-Luc Blanchemain (France) Jean-Luc Beaubelique (France) Patrice Goueslard	2013 Blancpain Endurance Series season
Blancpain Endurance Series	Pro Teams: (Belgium) BMW Marc VDS	2013 Blancpain Endurance Series season
Blancpain Endurance Series	Pro-Am Teams: (United Kingdom) Nissan GT Academy Team RJN	2013 Blancpain Endurance Series season
Blancpain Endurance Series	Gentleman Teams: (France) SOFREV ASP	2013 Blancpain Endurance Series season
FIA GT Series	Pro: (Monaco) Stéphane Ortelli (Belgium) Laurens Vanthoor	2013 FIA GT Series season
FIA GT Series	Pro-Am: (Russia) Sergey Afanasyev (Sweden) Andreas Simonsen	2013 FIA GT Series season
FIA GT Series	Gentlemen: (Czech Republic) Petr Charouz (Czech Republic) Jan Stoviček	2013 FIA GT Series season
FIA GT Series	Pro Teams: (Belgium) Belgian Audi Club Team WRT	2013 FIA GT Series season
FIA GT Series	Pro-Am Teams: (Germany) HTP Gravity Charouz	2013 FIA GT Series season
FIA GT Series	Gentleman Teams: (Germany) HTP Gravity Charouz	2013 FIA GT Series season
International GT Open	Overall: (Italy) Andrea Montermini	2013 International GT Open season
International GT Open	Super GT: (Italy) Andrea Montermini	2013 International GT Open season
International GT Open	Super GT Teams: (Netherlands) V8 Racing	2013 International GT Open season
International GT Open	Super GT Manufacturers: (Italy) Ferrari	2013 International GT Open season
International GT Open	GTS: (Italy) Giorgio Pantano	2013 International GT Open season
International GT Open	GTS Teams: (Italy) Bhai Tech Racing	2013 International GT Open season
International GT Open	GTS Manufacturers: (Italy) Ferrari	2013 International GT Open season
International GT Open	Gentleman: (Belarus) Alexander Talkanitsa	2013 International GT Open season
Rolex Sports Car Series	DP: (Italy) Max Angelelli (United States) Jordan Taylor	2013 Rolex Sports Car Series season
Rolex Sports Car Series	GT: (Italy) Alessandro Balzan	2013 Rolex Sports Car Series season
Rolex Sports Car Series	GX: (United States) Jim Norman	2013 Rolex Sports Car Series season
Trans-Am Series	TA: (United States) Doug Peterson	2013 Trans-Am season
Trans-Am Series	TA2: (United States) Cameron Lawrence	2013 Trans-Am season
Trans-Am Series	TA3-AM: (United States) Chuck Cassaro	2013 Trans-Am season
Trans-Am Series	TA3-I: (United States) David Seuss	2013 Trans-Am season
Australian GT Championship	(Australia) Klark Quinn	2013 Australian GT Championship season
Australian GT Championship	Trophy: (Australia) Steven McLaughlan	2013 Australian GT Championship season
Australian GT Championship	Challenge: (Australia) Ben Foessel	2013 Australian GT Championship season
Australian GT Championship	Sports: (Australia) Mark Griffith	2013 Australian GT Championship season
Australian Sports Sedan Championship	(Australia) Bruce Banks	2013 Kerrick Sports Sedan Series
Porsche Carrera Cup
Porsche Supercup	(Denmark) Nicki Thiim	2013 Porsche Supercup season
Porsche Supercup	Teams: (Germany) Attempto Racing	2013 Porsche Supercup season
Porsche Carrera Cup Germany	(France) Kévin Estre	2013 Porsche Carrera Cup Germany
Porsche Carrera Cup Germany	Teams: (Germany) Attempto Racing	2013 Porsche Carrera Cup Germany
Porsche Carrera Cup Great Britain	(United Kingdom) Michael Meadows	2013 Porsche Carrera Cup Great Britain
Porsche Carrera Cup Great Britain	Teams: (United Kingdom) Samsung Smart Motorsport	2013 Porsche Carrera Cup Great Britain
Porsche Carrera Cup France	(France) Gael Castelli	
Porsche Carrera Cup France	Teams: (France) Racing Technology	

== Stock car racing ==
Series	Champion(s)	refer
NASCAR Sprint Cup Series	(United States) Jimmie Johnson	2013 NASCAR Sprint Cup Series
NASCAR Sprint Cup Series	Manufacturers: (United States) Chevrolet	2013 NASCAR Sprint Cup Series
NASCAR Nationwide Series	(United States) Austin Dillon	2013 NASCAR Nationwide Series
NASCAR Nationwide Series	Manufacturers: (United States) Ford	2013 NASCAR Nationwide Series
NASCAR Camping World Truck Series	(United States) Matt Crafton	2013 NASCAR Camping World Truck Series
NASCAR Camping World Truck Series	Manufacturers: (Japan) Toyota	2013 NASCAR Camping World Truck Series
NASCAR Canadian Tire Series	(Canada) Scott Steckly	2013 NASCAR Canadian Tire Series
NASCAR Canadian Tire Series	Manufacturers: (United States) Dodge	2013 NASCAR Canadian Tire Series
NASCAR K&N Pro Series East	(United States) Dylan Kwasniewski	2013 NASCAR K&N Pro Series East
NASCAR K&N Pro Series West	(United States) Derek Thorn	2013 NASCAR K&N Pro Series West
NASCAR Toyota Series	(Mexico) Rodrigo Peralta	2013 NASCAR Toyota Series
NASCAR Whelen Euroseries	(Spain) Ander Vilariño	2013 Racecar Euro Series
ARCA Racing Series	(United States) Frank Kimmel	2013 ARCA Racing Series
Turismo Carretera	(Argentina) Diego Aventín	2013 Turismo Carretera Championship

== Touring car racing ==
Series	Champion	refer
World Touring Car Championship	(France) Yvan Muller	2013 World Touring Car Championship
World Touring Car Championship	Manufacturers: (Japan) Honda	2013 World Touring Car Championship
British Touring Car Championship	(United Kingdom) Andrew Jordan	2013 British Touring Car Championship
British Touring Car Championship	Teams: (United Kingdom) Honda Yuasa Racing Team	2013 British Touring Car Championship
British Touring Car Championship	Manufacturers: (Japan) Honda	2013 British Touring Car Championship
British Touring Car Championship	Independents: (United Kingdom) Andrew Jordan	2013 British Touring Car Championship
British Touring Car Championship	Independents Teams: (United Kingdom) Pirtek Racing	2013 British Touring Car Championship
British Touring Car Championship	Jack Sears Trophy: (United Kingdom) Lea Wood	2013 British Touring Car Championship
Deutsche Tourenwagen Masters	(Germany) Mike Rockenfeller	2013 Deutsche Tourenwagen Masters
Deutsche Tourenwagen Masters	Teams: (Germany) Audi Sport Team Phoenix	2013 Deutsche Tourenwagen Masters
Deutsche Tourenwagen Masters	Manufacturers: (Germany) BMW	2013 Deutsche Tourenwagen Masters
European Touring Car Cup	Super 2000: (Czech Republic) Petr Fulín	2013 European Touring Car Cup
European Touring Car Cup	Super 1600: (Germany) Kevin Krammes	2013 European Touring Car Cup
European Touring Car Cup	Single-makes: (Austria) Mario Dablander	2013 European Touring Car Cup
New Zealand V8 Championship	TLX: (Australia) Jason Bargwanna	2013 New Zealand V8 season
New Zealand V8 Championship	TL: (New Zealand) AJ Lauder	2013 New Zealand V8 season
Stock Car Brasil	(Brazil) Ricardo Maurício	2013 Stock Car Brasil season
Súper TC2000	(Argentina) Matías Rossi	2013 Súper TC2000
ADAC Procar Series	(Germany) Jens Guido Weimann	2013 ADAC Procar Series
ADAC Procar Series	Teams: (Germany) Thate Motorsport	2013 ADAC Procar Series
Australian Saloon Car Series	(Australia) Simon Tabinor	2013 Australian Saloon Car Series
Australian Suzuki Swift Series	(Australia) Luke Fraser	2013 Australian Suzuki Swift Series
Brasileiro de Marcas	(Brazil) Ricardo Maurício	2013 Brasileiro de Marcas
Brasileiro de Marcas	Teams: (Brazil) JML Racing	2013 Brasileiro de Marcas
Brasileiro de Marcas	Manufacturers: (Japan) Honda	2013 Brasileiro de Marcas
V8 Supercars Championship	(Australia) Jamie Whincup	2013 International V8 Supercars Championship
V8 Supercars Championship	Teams: (Australia) Triple Eight Race Engineering	2013 International V8 Supercars Championship
V8 Supercars Championship	Manufacturers: (Australia) Holden	2013 International V8 Supercars Championship
V8 Supercars Championship	Endurance Cup: (Australia) Craig Lowndes; Endurance Cup: (Australia) Warren Luff	2013 International V8 Supercars Championship
Dunlop V8 Supercar Series	(Australia) Dale Wood	2013 Dunlop V8 Supercar Series
V8SuperTourers	(New Zealand) Greg Murphy	2013 V8SuperTourer season
V8SuperTourers	Teams: (New Zealand) M3 Racing	2013 V8SuperTourer season
V8SuperTourers	Sprint: (New Zealand) Greg Murphy	2013 V8SuperTourer season
V8SuperTourers	Endurance: (New Zealand) Ant Pedersen; Endurance: (Australia) Chaz Mostert	2013 V8SuperTourer season
Eurocup Mégane Trophy	(Italy) Mirko Bortolotti	2013 Eurocup Mégane Trophy
Eurocup Mégane Trophy	Teams: (Italy) Oregon Team	2013 Eurocup Mégane Trophy
Eurocup Mégane Trophy	Gentlemen: (Netherlands) Jeroen Schothorst	2013 Eurocup Mégane Trophy
Renault Clio Cup
Renault Clio Eurocup	(United Kingdom) Josh Files	2013 Eurocup Clio
Renault Clio Eurocup	Junior: (United Kingdom) Josh Files	2013 Eurocup Clio
Renault Clio Eurocup	Gentlemen: (Italy) Massimiliano Pedalà	2013 Eurocup Clio

== Truck racing ==
Series	Driver	Season article
European Truck Racing Championship	(Germany) Jochen Hahn	2013 European Truck Racing Championship
European Truck Racing Championship	Teams: (Germany) Truck Sport Lutz Bernau	2013 European Truck Racing Championship
Fórmula Truck	(Brazil) Beto Monteiro	2013 Fórmula Truck season
Fórmula Truck	Teams: (Brazil) Scuderia Iveco	2013 Fórmula Truck season
Fórmula Truck	Manufacturers: (Germany) Mercedes-Benz	2013 Fórmula Truck season
Fórmula Truck	South American: (Brazil) Beto Monteiro	2013 Fórmula Truck season
Fórmula Truck	South American Manufacturers: (Italy) Iveco	2013 Fórmula Truck season
Stadium Super Trucks	(United States) Robby Gordon	2013 Stadium Super Trucks
V8 Ute Racing Series	(Australia) Ryal Harris	2013 Australian V8 Ute Racing Series

== See also ==
- List of motorsport championships
