= List of 2012 motorsport champions =

2012 motorsport champions
| Previous: 2011 | Next: 2013 |

This list of 2012 motorsport champions is a list of national or international auto racing series with championships decided by the points or positions earned by a driver from multiple races where the season was completed during the 2012 calendar year.

== Dirt oval racing ==
| Series | Champion | Refer |
|---|---|---|
| Lucas Oil Late Model Dirt Series | (United States) Jimmy Owens | |
| World of Outlaws Late Model Series | (United States) Darrell Lanigan | |
| World of Outlaws Sprint Car Series | (United States) Donny Schatz | |
| World of Outlaws Sprint Car Series | Teams: (United States) Tony Stewart Racing | |

== Drag racing ==
| Series | Champion | Refer |
|---|---|---|
| NHRA Full Throttle Drag Racing Series | Top Fuel: (United States) Antron Brown | 2012 NHRA Full Throttle Drag Racing Series season |
| NHRA Full Throttle Drag Racing Series | Funny Car: (United States) Jack Beckman | 2012 NHRA Full Throttle Drag Racing Series season |
| NHRA Full Throttle Drag Racing Series | Pro Stock: (United States) Allen Johnson | 2012 NHRA Full Throttle Drag Racing Series season |
| NHRA Full Throttle Drag Racing Series | Pro Stock Motorcycle: (United States) Eddie Krawiec | 2012 NHRA Full Throttle Drag Racing Series season |
| European Drag Racing Championship | Top Fuel: (Finland) Risto Poutianen | |
| European Drag Racing Championship | Top Methanol Dragster: (Malta) Manty Bugeja | |
| European Drag Racing Championship | Top Methanol Funny Car: (Sweden) Leif Andréasson | |
| European Drag Racing Championship | Pro Stock Car: (Sweden) Thomas Lindström | |
| European Drag Racing Championship | Pro Stock Modified: (Sweden) Michael Gullqvist | |

== Drifting ==
| Series | Champion | Refer |
|---|---|---|
| British Drift Championship | (United Kingdom) Christian Lewis | 2012 British Drift Championship |
| British Drift Championship | Super Pro: (United Kingdom) Paul Smith | 2012 British Drift Championship |
| British Drift Championship | Semi-Pro: (United Kingdom) Owen Taylor | 2012 British Drift Championship |
| D1 Grand Prix | (Japan) Nobushige Kumakubo | 2012 D1 Grand Prix series |
| D1 Grand Prix | D1SL: (Japan) Masashi Yokoi | 2012 D1 Grand Prix series |
| D1NZ | (New Zealand) Curt Whittaker | 2011–12 D1NZ season |
| D1NZ | Pro-Sport: (New Zealand) Cameron Vernon | 2011–12 D1NZ season |
| Drift Allstars | (Republic of Ireland) Alan Sinnott | 2012 Drift Allstars |
| European Drift Championship | (United Kingdom) Paul Conlan | 2012 European Drift Championship |
| Formula D | (Japan) Daigo Saito | 2012 Formula D season |
| Formula D Asia | (Japan) Daigo Saito | 2012 Formula D Asia season |

== Karting ==
| Series | Driver | Season article |
|---|---|---|
| CIK-FIA Karting World Championship | KF1: (Italy) Flavio Camponeschi | |
| CIK-FIA Karting World Championship | U18 KF3: (United Kingdom) Henry Easthope | |
| CIK-FIA KF3 World Cup | (Italy) Luca Corberi | |
| CIK-FIA Karting Academy Trophy | (Finland) Joonas Lappalainen | 2012 CIK-FIA Karting Academy Trophy |
| CIK-FIA Karting European Championship | KF2: (United Kingdom) Ben Barnicoat | |
| CIK-FIA Karting European Championship | KZ1: (Netherlands) Jorrit Pex | |
| CIK-FIA Karting European Championship | KF3: (United Kingdom) George Russell | |
| CIK-FIA Karting European Championship | KZ2: (Lithuania) Simas Juodvirsis | |
| WSK Euro Series | KZ1: (Netherlands) Jorrit Pex | |
| WSK Euro Series | KZ2: (Lithuania) Simas Juodvirsis | |
| WSK Euro Series | KF2: (Monaco) Charles Leclerc | |
| WSK Euro Series | KF3: (Spain) Álex Palou | |
| WSK Euro Series | 60 Mini: (Italy) Leonardo Lorandi | |
| Rotax Max Challenge | DD2: (United Kingdom) Ben Cooper | |
| Rotax Max Challenge | DD2 Masters: (South Africa) Cristiano Morgado | |
| Rotax Max Challenge | MAX: (Republic of Ireland) Charlie Eastwood | |
| Rotax Max Challenge | Junior: (United Kingdom) Harry Webb | |
| Rotax Max Challenge | Nations Cup: United Kingdom | |

== Motorcycle racing ==
| Series | Rider | refer |
|---|---|---|
| MotoGP World Championship | (Spain) Jorge Lorenzo | 2012 MotoGP World Championship |
| MotoGP World Championship | Teams: (Japan) Repsol Honda Team | 2012 MotoGP World Championship |
| MotoGP World Championship | Constructors: (Japan) Honda | 2012 MotoGP World Championship |
| Moto2 World Championship | (Spain) Marc Márquez | 2012 Moto2 World Championship |
| Moto2 World Championship | Teams: (Spain) Pons 40 HP Tuenti | 2012 Moto2 World Championship |
| Moto2 World Championship | Constructors: (Switzerland) Suter | 2012 Moto2 World Championship |
| Moto3 World Championship | (Germany) Sandro Cortese | 2012 Moto3 World Championship |
| Moto3 World Championship | Teams: (Finland) Red Bull KTM Ajo | 2012 Moto3 World Championship |
| Moto3 World Championship | Constructors: (Austria) KTM | 2012 Moto3 World Championship |
| Superbike World Championship | (Italy) Max Biaggi | 2012 Superbike World Championship |
| Superbike World Championship | Teams: (Italy) Aprilia Racing Team | 2012 Superbike World Championship |
| Superbike World Championship | Manufacturers: (Italy) Aprilia | 2012 Superbike World Championship |
| Supersport World Championship | (Turkey) Kenan Sofuoğlu | 2012 Supersport World Championship |
| Supersport World Championship | Teams: (Italy) Kawasaki Lorenzini | 2012 Supersport World Championship |
| Supersport World Championship | Manufacturers: (Japan) Honda | 2012 Supersport World Championship |
| Australian Superbike Championship | (Australia) Josh Waters | |

== Open wheel racing ==
| Series | Champions | References |
|---|---|---|
| FIA Formula One World Championship | (Germany) Sebastian Vettel | 2012 Formula One World Championship |
| FIA Formula One World Championship | Constructors: (Austria) Red Bull-Renault | 2012 Formula One World Championship |
| GP2 Series | (Italy) Davide Valsecchi | 2012 GP2 Series |
| GP2 Series | Teams: (France) DAMS | 2012 GP2 Series |
| GP3 Series | (New Zealand) Mitch Evans | 2012 GP3 Series |
| GP3 Series | Teams: (France) Lotus GP | 2012 GP3 Series |
| IndyCar Series | (United States) Ryan Hunter-Reay | 2012 IndyCar Series season |
| IndyCar Series | Manufacturers: (United States) Chevrolet | 2012 IndyCar Series season |
| IndyCar Series | Rookie: (France) Simon Pagenaud | 2012 IndyCar Series season |
| IndyCar Series | Oval: (United States) Ryan Hunter-Reay | 2012 IndyCar Series season |
| IndyCar Series | Road: (Australia) Will Power | 2012 IndyCar Series season |
| Firestone Indy Lights | (France) Tristan Vautier | 2012 Indy Lights season |
| Firestone Indy Lights | Teams: (United States) Sam Schmidt Motorsports | 2012 Indy Lights season |
| Formula Nippon Championship | (Japan) Kazuki Nakajima | 2012 Formula Nippon Championship |
| Formula Nippon Championship | Teams: (Japan) Dandelion Racing | 2012 Formula Nippon Championship |
| Auto GP World Series | (United Kingdom) Adrian Quaife-Hobbs | 2012 Auto GP World Series season |
| Auto GP World Series | Teams: (United Kingdom) Super Nova International | 2012 Auto GP World Series season |
| Auto GP World Series | Under 21 Trophy: (United Kingdom) Adrian Quaife-Hobbs | 2012 Auto GP World Series season |
| FIA Formula Two Championship | (United Kingdom) Luciano Bacheta | 2012 FIA Formula Two Championship season |
| Formula Volkswagen South Africa Championship | (South Africa) Jayde Kruger | 2012 Formula Volkswagen South Africa Championship |
| Toyota Racing Series | (New Zealand) Nick Cassidy | 2012 Toyota Racing Series |
| Formula Challenge Japan | (Japan) Nobuharu Matsushita | 2012 Formula Challenge Japan |
| Atlantic Championship Series | (United States) David Grant | 2012 Atlantic Championship |
| JAF Japan Formula 4 | East: (Japan) Ryōsuke Takehira | 2012 JAF Japan Formula 4 |
| JAF Japan Formula 4 | West: (Japan) Kosuke Hattori | 2012 JAF Japan Formula 4 |
| Star Mazda Championship | (United Kingdom) Jack Hawksworth | 2012 Star Mazda Championship season |
| ADAC Formel Masters | (Germany) Marvin Kirchhöfer | 2012 ADAC Formel Masters |
| ADAC Formel Masters | Teams: (Germany) Lotus | 2012 ADAC Formel Masters |
| BOSS GP Series | (Netherlands) Klaas Zwart | 2012 BOSS GP Series |
| BOSS GP Series | Teams: (United Kingdom) Team Ascari | 2012 BOSS GP Series |
| BOSS GP Series | Formula: (Austria) Bernd Herndlhofer | 2012 BOSS GP Series |
| BOSS GP Series | Masters: (Austria) Johann Ledermair | 2012 BOSS GP Series |
| Historic Formula One Championship | (Spain) Joaquin Folch | 2012 Historic Formula One Championship |
Formula Three
| FIA Formula 3 European Championship | (Spain) Daniel Juncadella | 2012 FIA Formula 3 European Championship |
| Formula 3 Euro Series | (Spain) Daniel Juncadella | 2012 Formula 3 Euro Series season |
| Formula 3 Euro Series | Rookie: (Germany) Pascal Wehrlein | 2012 Formula 3 Euro Series season |
| Formula 3 Euro Series | Teams: (Italy) Prema Powerteam | 2012 Formula 3 Euro Series season |
| Formula 3 Euro Series | Nations: Germany | 2012 Formula 3 Euro Series season |
| British Formula 3 Championship | (United Kingdom) Jack Harvey | 2012 British Formula 3 season |
| British Formula 3 Championship | Rookie: (Australia) Spike Goddard | 2012 British Formula 3 season |
| Chilean Formula Three Championship | (Chile) José Luis Riffo | 2012 Chilean Formula Three Championship |
| German Formula Three Championship | (Sweden) Jimmy Eriksson | 2012 German Formula Three season |
| German Formula Three Championship | Trophy: (Germany) André Rudersdorf | 2012 German Formula Three season |
| German Formula Three Championship | Rookie: (Austria) Lucas Auer | 2012 German Formula Three season |
| Italian F3 European Series | (Italy) Riccardo Agostini | 2012 Italian Formula Three season |
| Italian F3 European Series | Rookie: (Italy) Riccardo Agostini | 2012 Italian Formula Three season |
| Italian F3 European Series | Teams: (Italy) Prema Powerteam | 2012 Italian Formula Three season |
| Italian F3 Italian Series | (Italy) Riccardo Agostini | 2012 Italian Formula Three season |
| Italian F3 Italian Series | Teams: (Italy) Prema Powerteam | 2012 Italian Formula Three season |
| All-Japan Formula Three Championship | (Japan) Ryō Hirakawa | 2012 Japanese Formula 3 Championship |
| All-Japan Formula Three Championship | Teams: (Japan) RSS | 2012 Japanese Formula 3 Championship |
| All-Japan Formula Three Championship | National: (Japan) Daiki Sasaki | 2012 Japanese Formula 3 Championship |
| European F3 Open Championship | (Italy) Niccolò Schirò | 2012 European F3 Open season |
| European F3 Open Championship | Copa: (Italy) Kevin Giovesi | 2012 European F3 Open season |
| European F3 Open Championship | Teams: (Italy) RP Motorsport | 2012 European F3 Open season |
| MotorSport Vision Formula Three Cup | (United Kingdom) Chris Dittmann | 2012 MotorSport Vision Formula Three Cup |
| MotorSport Vision Formula Three Cup | Teams: (United Kingdom) Omicron Motorsport | 2012 MotorSport Vision Formula Three Cup |
| MotorSport Vision Formula Three Cup | Cup: (United Kingdom) Tristan Cliffe | 2012 MotorSport Vision Formula Three Cup |
| MotorSport Vision Formula Three Cup | Trophy: (United Kingdom) Chris Dittmann | 2012 MotorSport Vision Formula Three Cup |
| Australian Drivers' Championship | (United Kingdom) James Winslow | 2012 Australian Drivers' Championship |
| Austria Formula 3 Cup | (Germany) André Rudersdorf | |
| Formula 3 Sudamericana | (Brazil) Fernando Resende | 2012 Formula 3 Sudamericana season |
| Formula 3 Sudamericana | Light: (Brazil) Higor Hoffman | 2012 Formula 3 Sudamericana season |
Formula Renault
| Formula Renault 3.5 Series | (Netherlands) Robin Frijns | 2012 Formula Renault 3.5 Series season |
| Formula Renault 3.5 Series | Teams: (France) Tech 1 Racing | 2012 Formula Renault 3.5 Series season |
| Eurocup Formula Renault 2.0 | (Belgium) Stoffel Vandoorne | 2012 Eurocup Formula Renault 2.0 season |
| Eurocup Formula Renault 2.0 | Teams: (Germany) Josef Kaufmann Racing | 2012 Eurocup Formula Renault 2.0 season |
| Formula Renault Northern European Cup | (United Kingdom) Jake Dennis | 2012 Formula Renault 2.0 NEC season |
| Formula Renault Northern European Cup | Teams: (United Kingdom) Fortec Motorsports | 2012 Formula Renault 2.0 NEC season |
| Formula Renault 2.0 Alps | (Russia) Daniil Kvyat | 2012 Formula Renault 2.0 Alps season |
| Formula Renault 2.0 Alps | Junior: (Finland) Patrick Kujala | 2012 Formula Renault 2.0 Alps season |
| Formula Renault 2.0 Alps | Teams: (France) Tech 1 Racing | 2012 Formula Renault 2.0 Alps season |
| French F4 Championship | (France) Alexandre Baron | 2012 French F4 Championship season |
| Formula Renault Challenge 2.0 Italia | (Italy) Kevin Gilardoni | 2012 Formula Renault 2.0 Italia season |
| Formula Renault BARC | (United Kingdom) Scott Malvern | 2012 Formula Renault BARC season |
| Formula Renault BARC | Winter Series: (United Kingdom) Seb Morris | 2012 Formula Renault BARC season |
| Formula Renault 2.0 Argentina | (Argentina) Carlos Javier Merlo | 2012 Formula Renault 2.0 Argentina |
| Asian Formula Renault Challenge | (Japan) Yosuke Yamazaki | 2012 Asian Formula Renault Challenge season |
| Asian Formula Renault Challenge | Teams: (Hong Kong) Buzz Racing | 2012 Asian Formula Renault Challenge season |
| Asian Formula Renault Challenge | IFC: (Canada) Wayne Shen | 2012 Asian Formula Renault Challenge season |
| Asian Formula Renault Challenge | IFC Teams: (China) Asia Racing Team | 2012 Asian Formula Renault Challenge season |
| Austria Formel Renault Cup | (Switzerland) Thomas Amweg | 2012 Austria Formel Renault Cup season |
| Formula Monza | (Sweden) Erik Johansson | |
| V de V Challenge Monoplace | (France) Hugo Blanchot | 2012 V de V Challenge Monoplace |
Formula Abarth
| Formula Abarth European Series | (Brazil) Nicolas Costa | 2012 Formula Abarth season |
| Formula Abarth European Series | Rookie: (Uruguay) Santiago Urrutia | 2012 Formula Abarth season |
| Formula Abarth European Series | Teams: (Italy) Euronova Racing by Fortec | 2012 Formula Abarth season |
| Formula Abarth Italian Series | (Brazil) Nicolas Costa | 2012 Formula Abarth season |
| Formula Abarth Italian Series | Teams: (Italy) Euronova Racing by Fortec | 2012 Formula Abarth season |
| Formula Pilota China | (Italy) Antonio Giovinazzi | 2012 Formula Pilota China season |
| Formula Pilota China | Best Asian Driver Trophy: (India) Parth Ghorpade | 2012 Formula Pilota China season |
| Formula Pilota China | Teams: (Philippines) Eurasia Motorsport | 2012 Formula Pilota China season |
| Formula Russia | (Russia) Konstantin Tereshchenko | |
Formula BMW
| JK Racing Asia Series | (South Africa) Aston Hare | 2012 JK Racing Asia Series season |
| JK Racing Asia Series | Teams: (United States) EuroInternational | 2012 JK Racing Asia Series season |
| Formula LO | (Switzerland) Levin Amweg | 2012 Formula LO season |
| Formula LO | Rookie: (Germany) Freddy Killensberger | 2012 Formula LO season |
| Formula LO | Teams: (Germany) GU-Racing | 2012 Formula LO season |
| InterSteps Championship | (United Kingdom) Matt Parry | |
Formula Ford
| Australian Formula Ford Championship | (Australia) Jack Le Brocq | 2012 Australian Formula Ford Championship |
| British Formula Ford Championship | (Finland) Antti Buri | 2012 British Formula Ford season |
| British Formula Ford Championship | EcoBoost: (Finland) Antti Buri | 2012 British Formula Ford season |
| British Formula Ford Championship | Duratec: (United Kingdom) Matt Rao | 2012 British Formula Ford season |
| British Formula Ford Championship | EcoBoost Rookie: (Ecuador) Julio Moreno | 2012 British Formula Ford season |
| British Formula Ford Championship | Duratec Rookie: (United Kingdom) George Blundell | 2012 British Formula Ford season |
| British Formula Ford Championship | Teams: (United Kingdom) JTR | 2012 British Formula Ford season |
| British Formula Ford Championship | Constructors: (France) Mygale | 2012 British Formula Ford season |
| British Formula Ford Championship | Nations: Finland | 2012 British Formula Ford season |
| U.S. F2000 National Championship | (Australia) Matthew Brabham | 2012 U.S. F2000 National Championship |
| U.S. F2000 National Championship | National: (Norway) Henrik Furuseth | 2012 U.S. F2000 National Championship |
| U.S. F2000 National Championship | Teams: (United States) Cape Motorsports with Wayne Taylor Racing | 2012 U.S. F2000 National Championship |
| U.S. F2000 Winterfest | (United States) Spencer Pigot | 2012 U.S. F2000 Winterfest |
| F1600 Championship Series | (Finland) Matias Köykkä | 2012 F1600 Championship Series |
| F2000 Championship Series | (Venezuela) Roberto La Rocca | 2012 F2000 Championship Series season |
| Formula Ford Denmark | (Denmark) Nicolai Sylvest | |
| New Zealand Formula Ford Championship | (New Zealand) Andre Heimgartner | 2011–12 New Zealand Formula Ford Championship |
| Pacific F2000 Championship | (United States) Bobby Kelley | 2012 Pacific F2000 Championship |
| Scottish Formula Ford Championship | (United Kingdom) Ross McEwan | |
| Toyo Tires F1600 Championship Series | (Canada) Michael Adams | 2012 Toyo Tires F1600 Championship Series |

== Rallying ==
| Series | Champions | References |
|---|---|---|
| World Rally Championship | (France) Sébastien Loeb (Monaco) Daniel Elena | 2012 World Rally Championship season |
| World Rally Championship | Manufacturers: (France) Citroën | 2012 World Rally Championship season |
| European Rally Championship | (Finland) Juho Hänninen (Finland) Mikko Markkula | 2012 European Rally Championship season |
| Intercontinental Rally Challenge | (Norway) Andreas Mikkelsen (Norway) Ola Fløene | 2012 Intercontinental Rally Challenge season |
| African Rally Championship | (Zambia) Mohammed Essa | 2012 African Rally Championship |
| African Rally Championship | Co-Drivers: (Zimbabwe) Greg Stead | 2012 African Rally Championship |
| Asia-Pacific Rally Championship | (Australia) Chris Atkinson | 2012 Asia-Pacific Rally Championship |
| Asia-Pacific Rally Championship | Co-Drivers: (Belgium) Stéphane Prévot | 2012 Asia-Pacific Rally Championship |
| Australian Rally Championship | 2WD: (Australia) Eli Evans | 2012 Australian Rally Championship |
| Australian Rally Championship | 2WD Co-Drivers: (Australia) Glen Weston | 2012 Australian Rally Championship |
| Australian Rally Championship | 4WD: (Australia) Michael Boaden | 2012 Australian Rally Championship |
| Australian Rally Championship | 4WD Co-Drivers: (Australia) Helen Cheers | 2012 Australian Rally Championship |
| British Rally Championship | (Republic of Ireland) Keith Cronin | 2012 British Rally Championship |
| British Rally Championship | Co-Drivers: (United Kingdom) Marshall Clarke | 2012 British Rally Championship |
| Canadian Rally Championship | (Canada) Antoine L'Estage | 2012 Canadian Rally Championship |
| Canadian Rally Championship | Co-Drivers: (Canada) Nathalie Richard | 2012 Canadian Rally Championship |
| Central European Zone Rally Championship | Class 2: (Poland) Kajetan Kajetanowicz | 2012 Central European Zone Rally Championship |
| Central European Zone Rally Championship | Production: (Hungary) Zoltán Bessenyey | 2012 Central European Zone Rally Championship |
| Central European Zone Rally Championship | 2WD: (Poland) Radoslaw Typa | 2012 Central European Zone Rally Championship |
| Central European Zone Rally Championship | Historic: (Hungary) Ferenc Wirtmann | 2012 Central European Zone Rally Championship |
| Codasur South American Rally Championship | (Paraguay) Gustavo Saba | |
| Czech Rally Championship | (Czech Republic) Jan Kopecký | 2012 Czech Rally Championship |
| Czech Rally Championship | Co-Drivers: (Czech Republic) Pavel Dresler | 2012 Czech Rally Championship |
| Deutsche Rallye Meisterschaft | (Germany) Mark Wallenwein | |
| Estonian Rally Championship | (Estonia) Rainer Aus | 2012 Estonian Rally Championship |
| Estonian Rally Championship | Co-Drivers: (Estonia) Rein Jõessar | 2012 Estonian Rally Championship |
| French Rally Championship | (France) Jean-Marie Cuoq | |
| Hungarian Rally Championship | (Hungary) Miklós Kazár | |
| Hungarian Rally Championship | Co-Drivers: (Hungary) Ramón Ferencz | |
| Indian National Rally Championship | (India) Amittrajit Ghosh | |
| Indian National Rally Championship | Co-Drivers: (India) Ashwin Naik | |
| Italian Rally Championship | (Italy) Paolo Andreucci | |
| Italian Rally Championship | Co-Drivers: (Italy) Anna Andreussi | |
| Italian Rally Championship | Manufacturers: (France) Peugeot | |
| Middle East Rally Championship | (Qatar) Nasser Al-Attiyah | |
| NACAM Rally Championship | (Mexico) Ricardo Triviño | 2012 NACAM Rally Championship |
| NACAM Rally Championship | Co-Drivers: (Mexico) Marco Hernández | 2012 NACAM Rally Championship |
| New Zealand Rally Championship | (New Zealand) Richard Mason | 2012 New Zealand Rally Championship |
| New Zealand Rally Championship | Co-Drivers: (New Zealand) Sara Mason | 2012 New Zealand Rally Championship |
| Polish Rally Championship | (Poland) Kajetan Kajetanowicz | |
| Rally America | (United Kingdom) David Higgins | |
| Rally America | Co-Drivers: (United Kingdom) Craig Drew | |
| Romanian Rally Championship | (France) François Delecour | |
| Scottish Rally Championship | (United Kingdom) David Bogie | 2012 Scottish Rally Championship |
| Scottish Rally Championship | Co-Drivers: (United Kingdom) Kevin Rae | 2012 Scottish Rally Championship |
| Slovak Rally Championship | (Poland) Grzegorz Grzyb | |
| Slovak Rally Championship | Co-Drivers: (Poland) Robert Hundla | |
| South African National Rally Championship | (South Africa) Mark Cronje | |
| South African National Rally Championship | Co-Drivers: (South Africa) Robin Houghton | |
| South African National Rally Championship | Manufacturers: (United States) Ford | |
| Spanish Rally Championship | (Spain) Miguel Ángel Fuster | |
| Spanish Rally Championship | Co-Drivers: (Spain) Ignacio Aviñó | |

=== Rallycross ===
| Series | Driver | Season article |
|---|---|---|
| FIA European Rallycross Championship | Supercar: (Russia) Timur Timerzyanov | 2012 European Rallycross Championship |
| FIA European Rallycross Championship | Super1600: (Norway) Andreas Bakkerud | 2012 European Rallycross Championship |
| FIA European Rallycross Championship | TouringCar: (Sweden) Anton Marklund | 2012 European Rallycross Championship |
| British Rallycross Championship | (United Kingdom) Julian Godfrey | |
| Global Rallycross | (United States) Tanner Foust | 2012 Global RallyCross Championship |

== Sports car and GT ==
| Series | Champions | References |
|---|---|---|
| FIA World Endurance Championship | (Germany) André Lotterer (France) Benoît Tréluyer (Switzerland) Marcel Fässler | 2012 FIA World Endurance Championship |
| FIA World Endurance Championship | Manufacturers' WC: (Germany) Audi | 2012 FIA World Endurance Championship |
| FIA World Endurance Championship | Manufacturers' WC: (Italy) Ferrari | 2012 FIA World Endurance Championship |
| FIA World Endurance Championship | LMP1 Trophy: (Switzerland) Rebellion Racing | 2012 FIA World Endurance Championship |
| FIA World Endurance Championship | LMP2 Trophy: (United States) Starworks Motorsport | 2012 FIA World Endurance Championship |
| FIA World Endurance Championship | LMGTE Pro Trophy: (Italy) AF Corse | 2012 FIA World Endurance Championship |
| FIA World Endurance Championship | LMGTE Am Trophy: (France) Larbre Compétition | 2012 FIA World Endurance Championship |
| FIA GT1 World Championship | (Germany) Marc Basseng (Germany) Markus Winkelhock | 2012 FIA GT1 World Championship season |
| FIA GT1 World Championship | Teams: (Germany) All-Inkl.com Münnich Motorsport | 2012 FIA GT1 World Championship season |
| FIA GT3 European Championship | (Austria) Dominik Baumann (Germany) Maximilian Buhk | 2012 FIA GT3 European Championship season |
| FIA GT3 European Championship | Teams: (Czech Republic) Heico Gravity-Charouz Team | 2012 FIA GT3 European Championship season |
| American Le Mans Series | LMPC: (Venezuela) Alex Popow | 2012 American Le Mans Series season |
| American Le Mans Series | GT: (United Kingdom) Oliver Gavin; GT: (United States) Tommy Milner | 2012 American Le Mans Series season |
| American Le Mans Series | GTC: (United States) Cooper MacNeil | 2012 American Le Mans Series season |
| ADAC GT Masters | (Germany) Sebastian Asch (Germany) Maximilian Götz | 2012 ADAC GT Masters season |
| ADAC GT Masters | Teams: (Germany) MS Racing Team | 2012 ADAC GT Masters season |
| ADAC GT Masters | Amateurs: (Germany) Swen Dolenc | 2012 ADAC GT Masters season |
| Australian GT Championship | (Australia) Klark Quinn | 2012 Australian GT Championship season |
| Australian GT Championship | Trophy: (Australia) Dean Koutsoumidis (Australia) Andrew McInnes | 2012 Australian GT Championship season |
| Australian GT Championship | Challenge: (Australia) Jan Jinadasa | 2012 Australian GT Championship season |
| Australian GT Championship | Sports: (Australia) Darren Berry | 2012 Australian GT Championship season |
| Australian Sports Sedan Championship | (Australia) Kerry Baily | 2012 Australian Sports Sedan season |
| British GT Championship | GT3: (Switzerland) Daniele Perfetti; GT3: (United Kingdom) Michael Caine | 2012 British GT Championship |
| British GT Championship | GT4: (United Kingdom) Jody Fannin; GT4: (United Kingdom) Warren Hughes | 2012 British GT Championship |
| British GT Championship | GTC: (United Kingdom) Gary Eastwood; GTC: (United Kingdom) Ryan Hooker | 2012 British GT Championship |
Porsches
| Porsche Supercup | (Germany) René Rast | 2012 Porsche Supercup season |
| Porsche Supercup | Teams: (Germany) Hermes Attempto Racing | 2012 Porsche Supercup season |
| Porsche Supercup | Rookie: (Denmark) Nicki Thiim | 2012 Porsche Supercup season |

== Stock car racing ==
| Series | Champions | References |
|---|---|---|
| NASCAR Sprint Cup Series | (United States) Brad Keselowski | 2012 NASCAR Sprint Cup Series |
| NASCAR Sprint Cup Series | Manufacturers: (United States) Chevrolet | 2012 NASCAR Sprint Cup Series |
| NASCAR Nationwide Series | (United States) Ricky Stenhouse Jr. | 2012 NASCAR Nationwide Series |
| NASCAR Nationwide Series | Manufacturers: (United States) Chevrolet | 2012 NASCAR Nationwide Series |
| NASCAR Camping World Truck Series | (United States) James Buescher | 2012 NASCAR Camping World Truck Series |
| NASCAR Camping World Truck Series | Manufacturers: (United States) Chevrolet | 2012 NASCAR Camping World Truck Series |
| NASCAR Canadian Tire Series | (Canada) D. J. Kennington | 2012 NASCAR Canadian Tire Series |
| NASCAR Canadian Tire Series | Manufacturers: (United States) Dodge | 2012 NASCAR Canadian Tire Series |
| NASCAR K&N Pro Series East | (United States) Kyle Larson | 2012 NASCAR K&N Pro Series East |
| NASCAR K&N Pro Series West | (United States) Dylan Kwasniewski | 2012 NASCAR K&N Pro Series West |
| NASCAR Toyota Series | (Mexico) Jorge Goeters | 2012 NASCAR Toyota Series |
| ARCA Racing Series | (United States) Chris Buescher | 2012 ARCA Racing Series |
| Racecar Euro Series | (Spain) Ander Vilariño | 2012 Racecar Euro Series |
| Turismo Carretera | (Argentina) Mauro Giallombardo | 2012 Turismo Carretera |

== Touring car racing ==
| Series | Champion | References |
|---|---|---|
| World Touring Car Championship | (United Kingdom) Robert Huff | 2012 World Touring Car Championship season |
| World Touring Car Championship | Manufacturers: (United States) Chevrolet | 2012 World Touring Car Championship season |
| British Touring Car Championship | (United Kingdom) Gordon Shedden | 2012 British Touring Car Championship |
| British Touring Car Championship | Teams: (United Kingdom) Honda Yuasa Racing Team | 2012 British Touring Car Championship |
| British Touring Car Championship | Manufacturers: (Japan) Honda | 2012 British Touring Car Championship |
| British Touring Car Championship | Independents: (United Kingdom) Andrew Jordan | 2012 British Touring Car Championship |
| British Touring Car Championship | Independents Teams: (United Kingdom) Pirtek Racing | 2012 British Touring Car Championship |
| Deutsche Tourenwagen Masters | (Canada) Bruno Spengler | 2012 Deutsche Tourenwagen Masters |
| Deutsche Tourenwagen Masters | Teams: (Germany) BMW Team Schnitzer | 2012 Deutsche Tourenwagen Masters |
| Deutsche Tourenwagen Masters | Manufacturers: (Germany) BMW | 2012 Deutsche Tourenwagen Masters |
| Eurocup Mégane Trophy | (Spain) Albert Costa | 2012 Eurocup Mégane Trophy season |
| Eurocup Mégane Trophy | Teams: (Italy) Oregon Team | 2012 Eurocup Mégane Trophy season |
| European Touring Car Cup | Super 2000: (Spain) Fernando Monje | 2012 European Touring Car Cup season |
| European Touring Car Cup | Super 1600: (Germany) Kevin Krammes | 2012 European Touring Car Cup season |
| European Touring Car Cup | Super Production: (Russia) Nikolay Karamyshev | 2012 European Touring Car Cup season |
| European Touring Car Cup | Single-Makes Trophy: (Norway) Stian Paulsen | 2012 European Touring Car Cup season |
| V8 Supercars Championship | (Australia) Jamie Whincup | 2012 International V8 Supercars Championship |
| V8 Supercars Championship | Teams: (Australia) Triple Eight Race Engineering | 2012 International V8 Supercars Championship |
| V8 Supercars Championship | Manufacturers: (Australia) Holden | 2012 International V8 Supercars Championship |
| Dunlop V8 Supercar Series | (New Zealand) Scott McLaughlin | 2012 Dunlop V8 Supercar Series |
| New Zealand V8s | (New Zealand) Angus Fogg | 2011–12 New Zealand V8 season |
| Stock Car Brasil | (Brazil) Cacá Bueno | 2012 Stock Car Brasil season |
| Súper TC2000 | (Argentina) José María López | 2012 Súper TC2000 |
| V8SuperTourers | (New Zealand) John McIntyre | 2012 V8SuperTourer season |
| V8SuperTourers | Teams: (New Zealand) MPC Motorsport | 2012 V8SuperTourer season |
| V8SuperTourers | Sprint: (New Zealand) John McIntyre | 2012 V8SuperTourer season |
| V8SuperTourers | Endurance: (New Zealand) Scott McLaughlin; Endurance: (Australia) Jonathon Webb | 2012 V8SuperTourer season |
| ADAC Procar Series | (Germany) Jens Guido Weimann | 2012 ADAC Procar Series |
| ADAC Procar Series | Teams: (Germany) Thate Motorsport | 2012 ADAC Procar Series |
| Australian Saloon Car Series | (Australia) Simon Tabinor | 2012 Australian Saloon Car Series |
| Australian Suzuki Swift Series | (Australia) Allan Jarvis | 2012 Australian Suzuki Swift Series |
| Brasileiro de Marcas | (Brazil) Ricardo Maurício | 2012 Brasileiro de Marcas |
| Brasileiro de Marcas | Teams: (Brazil) Full Time Sports | 2012 Brasileiro de Marcas |
| Brasileiro de Marcas | Manufacturers: (Japan) Toyota | 2012 Brasileiro de Marcas |
| Chevrolet Supercars Middle East Championship | SC09: (France) Alban Varutti | 2011–12 Chevrolet Supercars Middle East Championship |
| Chevrolet Supercars Middle East Championship | SC06: (Bahrain) Nasser Al Alawi | 2011–12 Chevrolet Supercars Middle East Championship |

== Truck racing ==
| Series | Driver | Season article |
|---|---|---|
| European Truck Racing Championship | (Germany) Jochen Hahn | 2012 European Truck Racing Championship |
| European Truck Racing Championship | Teams: (Czech Republic) MKR Technology | 2012 European Truck Racing Championship |
| Fórmula Truck | (Brazil) Leandro Totti | 2012 Fórmula Truck season |
| Fórmula Truck | Teams: (Brazil) ABF Racing Team | 2012 Fórmula Truck season |
| Fórmula Truck | Manufacturers: (Germany) Mercedes-Benz | 2012 Fórmula Truck season |
| Fórmula Truck | South American: (Brazil) Leandro Totti | 2012 Fórmula Truck season |
| Fórmula Truck | South American Manufacturers: (Germany) Volkswagen | 2012 Fórmula Truck season |
| V8 Ute Racing Series | (Australia) Ryal Harris | 2012 Australian V8 Ute Racing Series |

== See also ==
- List of motorsport championships
