= List of 2011 motorsport champions =

2011 motorsport champions
Previous: 2010	Next: 2012

This list of 2011 motorsport champions is a list of national or international auto racing series with championships decided by the points or positions earned by a driver from multiple races where the season was completed during the 2011 calendar year.

== Dirt oval racing ==
Series	Champion	Refer
Lucas Oil Late Model Dirt Series	(United States) Jimmy Owens	
World of Outlaws Late Model Series	(United States) Rick Eckert	
World of Outlaws Sprint Car Series	(United States) Jason Meyers	
World of Outlaws Sprint Car Series	Teams: (United States) Elite Racing	

== Drag racing ==
Series	Champion	Refer
NHRA Full Throttle Drag Racing Series	Top Fuel: (United States) Del Worsham	2011 NHRA Full Throttle Drag Racing Series season
NHRA Full Throttle Drag Racing Series	Funny Car: (United States) Matt Hagan	2011 NHRA Full Throttle Drag Racing Series season
NHRA Full Throttle Drag Racing Series	Pro Stock: (United States) Jason Line	2011 NHRA Full Throttle Drag Racing Series season
NHRA Full Throttle Drag Racing Series	Pro Stock Motorcycle: (United States) Eddie Krawiec	2011 NHRA Full Throttle Drag Racing Series season
European Drag Racing Championship	Top Fuel: (Switzerland) Urs Erbacher	
European Drag Racing Championship	Top Methanol Dragster: (Norway) Fred Hanssen	
European Drag Racing Championship	Top Methanol Funny Car: (Sweden) Ulf Leanders	
European Drag Racing Championship	Pro Stock Car: (Sweden) Jimmy Ålund	
European Drag Racing Championship	Pro Stock Modified: (Sweden) Michael Gullqvist	

== Drifting ==
Series	Champion	Refer
British Drift Championship	(United Kingdom) Michael Marshall	2011 British Drift Championship
British Drift Championship	Super-Pro: (United Kingdom) Matt Carter	2011 British Drift Championship
British Drift Championship	Semi-Pro: (United Kingdom) Matt Campling	2011 British Drift Championship
D1 Grand Prix	(Japan) Youichi Imamura	2011 D1 Grand Prix series
D1 Grand Prix	D1SL: (Japan) Seimi Tanaka	2011 D1 Grand Prix series
D1NZ	(New Zealand) Gaz Whiter	2010–11 D1NZ season
D1NZ	Pro-Sport: (New Zealand) Nico Reid	2010–11 D1NZ season
Drift Allstars	(Republic of Ireland) James Deane	2011 Drift Allstars
European Drift Championship	(United Kingdom) Brett Castle	2011 European Drift Championship
Formula D	(Japan) Daijiro Yoshihara	2011 Formula D season
Formula D Asia	(Japan) Daigo Saito	2011 Formula D Asia season

== Karting ==
Series	Driver	Season article
CIK-FIA Karting World Championship	KF1: (Netherlands) Nyck de Vries	
CIK-FIA Karting World Championship	U18 KF3: (United Kingdom) Matthew Graham	
CIK-FIA KF3 World Cup	(Monaco) Charles Leclerc	
CIK-FIA Karting Academy Trophy	(Monaco) Charles Leclerc	2011 CIK-FIA Karting Academy Trophy
CIK-FIA Karting European Championship	KF2: (Belgium) Sami Luka	
CIK-FIA Karting European Championship	KZ1: (Italy) Paolo De Conto	
CIK-FIA Karting European Championship	KF3: (United Kingdom) George Russell	
CIK-FIA Karting European Championship	KZ2: (Italy) Fabian Federer	
WSK Euro Series	KZ1: (Belgium) Rick Dreezen	
WSK Euro Series	KZ2: (Sweden) Joel Johansson	
WSK Euro Series	KF2: (Italy) Stefano Cucco	
WSK Euro Series	KF3: (Netherlands) Max Verstappen	
Rotax Max Challenge	DD2: (Canada) Pier-Luc Ouellette	
Rotax Max Challenge	DD2 Masters: (South Africa) Cristiano Morgado	
Rotax Max Challenge	MAX: (United Kingdom) Ben Cooper	
Rotax Max Challenge	Junior: (Japan) Ukyo Sasahara	
Rotax Max Challenge	Nations Cup: Australia	

== Motorcycle racing ==
Series	Rider	refer
MotoGP World Championship	(Australia) Casey Stoner	2011 Grand Prix motorcycle racing season
MotoGP World Championship	Constructors: (Japan) Honda	2011 Grand Prix motorcycle racing season
Moto2 World Championship	(Germany) Stefan Bradl	2011 Grand Prix motorcycle racing season
Moto2 World Championship	Constructors: (Switzerland) Suter	2011 Grand Prix motorcycle racing season
125cc World Championship	(Spain) Nicolás Terol	2011 Grand Prix motorcycle racing season
125cc World Championship	Constructors: (Italy) Aprilia	2011 Grand Prix motorcycle racing season
Superbike World Championship	(Spain) Carlos Checa	2011 Superbike World Championship
Superbike World Championship	Manufacturers: (Italy) Ducati	2011 Superbike World Championship
Supersport World Championship	(United Kingdom) Chaz Davies	2011 Supersport World Championship
Supersport World Championship	Manufacturers: (Japan) Yamaha	2011 Supersport World Championship
FIM Superstock 1000 Cup	(Italy) Davide Giugliano	2011 FIM Superstock 1000 Cup
FIM Superstock 1000 Cup	Manufacturers: (Italy) Ducati	2011 FIM Superstock 1000 Cup
European Superstock 600 Championship	(Australia) Jed Metcher	
Australian Superbike Championship	(Australia) Glenn Allerton	

== Open wheel racing ==
Series	Champion(s)	refer
FIA Formula One World Championship	(Germany) Sebastian Vettel	2011 Formula One World Championship
FIA Formula One World Championship	Constructors: (Austria) Red Bull Racing-Renault	2011 Formula One World Championship
GP2 Series	(France) Romain Grosjean	2011 GP2 Series
GP2 Series	Teams: (Spain) Barwa Addax Team	2011 GP2 Series
GP2 Asia Series	(France) Romain Grosjean	2011 GP2 Asia Series
GP2 Asia Series	Teams: (France) DAMS	2011 GP2 Asia Series
GP3 Series	(Finland) Valtteri Bottas	2011 GP3 Series
GP3 Series	Teams: (France) Lotus ART	2011 GP3 Series
IndyCar Series	(United Kingdom) Dario Franchitti	2011 IndyCar Series season
IndyCar Series	Rookie: (Canada) James Hinchcliffe	2011 IndyCar Series season
Firestone Indy Lights	(United States) Josef Newgarden	2011 Indy Lights season
Firestone Indy Lights	Teams: (United States) Sam Schmidt Motorsports	2011 Indy Lights season
Formula Nippon	(Germany) André Lotterer	2011 Formula Nippon season
Formula Nippon	Teams: (Japan) Petronas Team TOM'S	2011 Formula Nippon season
Auto GP	(Italy) Kevin Ceccon	2011 Auto GP season
Auto GP	Under 21 Trophy: (Italy) Kevin Ceccon	2011 Auto GP season
Auto GP	Teams: (France) DAMS	2011 Auto GP season
Superleague Formula	Australia (John Martin)	2011 Superleague Formula season
FIA Formula Two Championship	(Italy) Mirko Bortolotti	2011 FIA Formula Two Championship season
Star Mazda Championship	(France) Tristan Vautier	2011 Star Mazda Championship season
Star Mazda Championship	Expert: (United States) J. W. Roberts	2011 Star Mazda Championship season
Historic Formula One Championship	(United States) John Delane	2011 Historic Formula One Championship
ADAC Formel Masters	(Germany) Pascal Wehrlein	2011 ADAC Formel Masters
ADAC Formel Masters	Teams: (Germany) Motopark Academy	2011 ADAC Formel Masters
Toyota Racing Series	(New Zealand) Mitch Evans	2011 Toyota Racing Series
Toyota Racing Series	Teams: (New Zealand) Giles Motorsport	2011 Toyota Racing Series
BOSS GP Series	(Netherlands) Klaas Zwart	2011 BOSS GP Series
BOSS GP Series	Teams: (United Kingdom) Team Ascari	2011 BOSS GP Series
BOSS GP Series	Formula: (Austria) Ingo Gerstl	2011 BOSS GP Series
BOSS GP Series	Masters: (Austria) Norbert Gruber	2011 BOSS GP Series
JAF Japan Formula 4	East: (Japan) Yuhi Sekiguchi	2011 JAF Japan Formula 4
JAF Japan Formula 4	West: (Japan) Ryō Hirakawa	2011 JAF Japan Formula 4
Formula Challenge Japan	(Japan) Takamoto Katsuta	2011 Formula Challenge Japan
Formula Future Fiat	(Brazil) Guilherme Silva	2011 Formula Future Fiat season
Formula Maruti	(India) Mohit Aryan	2011 Formula Maruti season
Formula Maruti	Temas: (India) Wallace Sports Research Foundation	2011 Formula Maruti season
Formula Volkswagen South Africa Championship	(South Africa) Jayde Kruger	2011 Formula Volkswagen South Africa Championship
Formula Volkswagen South Africa Championship	Teams: (South Africa) Racing Factors	2011 Formula Volkswagen South Africa Championship
Skip Barber National Championship	(United States) Scott Anderson	
Formula Three
FIA Formula 3 International Trophy	(Spain) Roberto Merhi	2011 FIA Formula 3 International Trophy season
Formula 3 Euro Series	(Spain) Roberto Merhi	2011 Formula 3 Euro Series season
Formula 3 Euro Series	Teams: (Italy) Prema Powerteam	2011 Formula 3 Euro Series season
Formula 3 Euro Series	Rookie: (Netherlands) Nigel Melker	2011 Formula 3 Euro Series season
Formula 3 Euro Series	Nation: Spain	2011 Formula 3 Euro Series season
British Formula 3 Championship	(Brazil) Felipe Nasr	2011 British Formula 3 season
British Formula 3 Championship	Rookie: (Japan) Kotaro Sakurai	2011 British Formula 3 season
Chilean Formula Three Championship	(Chile) Pablo Donoso	2011 Chilean Formula Three Championship
German Formula Three Championship	Cup: (New Zealand) Richie Stanaway	2011 German Formula Three season
German Formula Three Championship	Trophy: (Russia) Maxim Travin	2011 German Formula Three season
German Formula Three Championship	Rookie: (New Zealand) Richie Stanaway	2011 German Formula Three season
Italian Formula Three Championship	(Italy) Sergio Campana	2011 Italian Formula Three season
Italian Formula Three Championship	Teams: (Italy) BVM – Target Racing	2011 Italian Formula Three season
Italian Formula Three Championship	Rookie: (United States) Michael Lewis	2011 Italian Formula Three season
All-Japan Formula Three Championship	(Japan) Yuhi Sekiguchi	2011 Japanese Formula 3 Championship
All-Japan Formula Three Championship	Teams: (Japan) ThreeBond Racing	2011 Japanese Formula 3 Championship
All-Japan Formula Three Championship	National: (Japan) Katsumasa Chiyo	2011 Japanese Formula 3 Championship
European F3 Open Championship	Open: (Switzerland) Alex Fontana	2011 European F3 Open season
European F3 Open Championship	Teams: (United Kingdom) Team West-Tec	2011 European F3 Open season
European F3 Open Championship	Copa: (Brazil) Fabio Gamberini	2011 European F3 Open season
Australian Drivers' Championship	Gold Star: (Australia) Chris Gilmour	2011 Australian Drivers' Championship
Australian Drivers' Championship	National: (Australia) Steel Guiliana	2011 Australian Drivers' Championship
Formula 3 Sudamericana	(Brazil) Fabiano Machado	2011 Formula 3 Sudamericana season
Formula 3 Sudamericana	Light: (Brazil) Bruno Bonifácio	2011 Formula 3 Sudamericana season
Formula Renault
Formula Renault 3.5 Series	(Canada) Robert Wickens	2011 Formula Renault 3.5 Series season
Formula Renault 3.5 Series	Teams: (United Kingdom) Carlin	2011 Formula Renault 3.5 Series season
Eurocup Formula Renault 2.0	(Netherlands) Robin Frijns	2011 Eurocup Formula Renault 2.0 season
Eurocup Formula Renault 2.0	Teams: (Finland) Koiranen Motorsport	2011 Eurocup Formula Renault 2.0 season
Formula Renault Northern European Cup	(Spain) Carlos Sainz Jr.	2011 Formula Renault 2.0 NEC season
Formula Renault Northern European Cup	Teams: (Finland) Koiranen bros.	2011 Formula Renault 2.0 NEC season
Formula Renault 2.0 Alps	(Spain) Javier Tarancón	2011 Formula Renault 2.0 Alps season
Formula Renault 2.0 Alps	Junior: (United Kingdom) Melville McKee	2011 Formula Renault 2.0 Alps season
Formula Renault 2.0 Alps	Teams: (France) Tech 1 Racing	2011 Formula Renault 2.0 Alps season
Formula Renault UK	(United Kingdom) Alex Lynn	2011 Formula Renault UK season
Formula Renault UK	Graduate: (United Kingdom) Oliver Rowland	2011 Formula Renault UK season
Formula Renault UK	Entrants: (United Kingdom) Fortec Motorsports	2011 Formula Renault UK season
Formula Renault UK	Finals: (United Kingdom) Oliver Rowland	2011 Formula Renault UK season
Formula Renault Challenge 2.0 Italia	(Italy) Andrea Boffo	2011 Formula Renault 2.0 Italia season
Formula Renault Challenge 2.0 Italia	Teams: (Italy) Team Torino Motorsport	2011 Formula Renault 2.0 Italia season
Formula Renault 2.0 Argentina	(Argentina) Rodrigo Rogani	2011 Formula Renault 2.0 Argentina
French F4 Championship	(France) Matthieu Vaxivière	2011 French F4 Championship season
V de V Challenge Monoplace	(France) Simon Gachet	2011 V de V Challenge Monoplace
Formula Abarth
Formula Abarth European Series	(Russia) Sergey Sirotkin	2011 Formula Abarth season
Formula Abarth European Series	Teams: (Switzerland) Jenzer Motorsport	2011 Formula Abarth season
Formula Abarth European Series	Rookie (Spain) Gerard Barrabeig	2011 Formula Abarth season
Formula Abarth Italian Series	(Switzerland) Patric Niederhauser	2011 Formula Abarth season
Formula Abarth Italian Series	Teams: (Switzerland) Jenzer Motorsport	2011 Formula Abarth season
Formula Abarth Italian Series	National Trophy: (Japan) Yoshitaka Kuroda	2011 Formula Abarth season
Formula Pilota China	(Czech Republic) Mathéo Tuscher	2011 Formula Pilota China season
Formula Pilota China	Asian Trophy: (Indonesia) Dustin Sofyan	2011 Formula Pilota China season
Formula BMW
JK Racing Asia Series	(Austria) Lucas Auer	2011 JK Racing Asia Series season
JK Racing Asia Series	Teams: (United States) EuroInternational	2011 JK Racing Asia Series season
JK Racing Asia Series	Rookie: (Austria) Lucas Auer	2011 JK Racing Asia Series season
Formula Lista Junior	(United Kingdom) Philip Ellis	2011 Formula Lista Junior season
Formula Lista Junior	Teams: (Switzerland) Daltec Racing	2011 Formula Lista Junior season
InterSteps Championship	(United Kingdom) Jake Dennis	
Formula Ford
British Formula Ford Championship	C: (United Kingdom) Scott Malvern	2011 British Formula Ford season
British Formula Ford Championship	S: (United Kingdom) Cavan Corcoran	2011 British Formula Ford season
British Formula Ford Championship	Teams: (United Kingdom) Jamun Racing	2011 British Formula Ford season
Australian Formula Ford Championship	(Australia) Cameron Waters	2011 Australian Formula Ford Championship
New Zealand Formula Ford Championship	(New Zealand) Andre Heimgartner	
Pacific F2000 Championship	(United States) Conner Ford	2011 Pacific F2000 Championship
U.S. F2000 National Championship	(Finland) Petri Suvanto	2011 U.S. F2000 National Championship
U.S. F2000 National Championship	Teams: (United States) Andretti Autosport	2011 U.S. F2000 National Championship
U.S. F2000 Winterfest	(United States) Zach Veach	2011 U.S. F2000 Winterfest
F1600 Championship Series	(United States) Bill Valet	2011 F1600 Championship Series
F2000 Championship Series	(Canada) Remy Audette	2011 F2000 Championship Series
Formula Tour 1600	(Canada) Nathan Blok	
Scottish Formula Ford Championship	(United Kingdom) Kenneth Thirlwall	
Ontario Formula Ford Championship	(United States) Trent Hindman	2011 Ontario Formula Ford Championship

== Rallying ==
Series	Champion(s)	refer
World Rally Championship	(France) Sébastien Loeb (Monaco) Daniel Elena	2011 World Rally Championship
World Rally Championship	Manufacturers: (France) Citroën	2011 World Rally Championship
Intercontinental Rally Challenge	(Norway) Andreas Mikkelsen (Norway) Ola Fløene	2011 Intercontinental Rally Challenge
Intercontinental Rally Challenge	Manufacturers: (Czech Republic) Škoda	2011 Intercontinental Rally Challenge
Intercontinental Rally Challenge	Production Cup: (Japan) Toshi Arai; Production Cup: (Australia) Dale Moscatt	2011 Intercontinental Rally Challenge
Intercontinental Rally Challenge	2WD Cup: (France) Jean-Michel Raoux	2011 Intercontinental Rally Challenge
Intercontinental Rally Challenge	2WD Manufacturers: (Japan) Honda	2011 Intercontinental Rally Challenge
African Rally Championship	(Zimbabwe) Conrad Rautenbach	2011 African Rally Championship
African Rally Championship	Co-Drivers: (Zimbabwe) Nicolas Klinger	2011 African Rally Championship
Asia-Pacific Rally Championship	Teams: (Malaysia) Proton Motorsports	2011 Asia-Pacific Rally Championship
Asia-Pacific Rally Championship	Pacific Cup: (Australia) Chris Atkinson; Pacific Cup: (Belgium) Stéphane Prevot	2011 Asia-Pacific Rally Championship
Australian Rally Championship	(Australia) Justin Dowel	2011 Australian Rally Championship
Australian Rally Championship	Co-Drivers: (Australia) Matt Lee	2011 Australian Rally Championship
Rally America	(United Kingdom) David Higgins (United Kingdom) Craig Drew	2011 Rally America season
Rally America	Super Production: (United States) Travis Hanson; Super Production: (United States) Terry Hanson	2011 Rally America season
Rally America	2WD: (United States) Wyatt Knox	2011 Rally America season
British Rally Championship	(United Kingdom) David Bogie (United Kingdom) Kevin Rae	2011 British Rally Championship
British Rally Championship	Teams: (United Kingdom) Autosport Technology	2011 British Rally Championship
British Rally Championship	F2/R3: (United Kingdom) Martin McCormack; F2/R3: (United Kingdom) David Moynihan	2011 British Rally Championship
British Rally Championship	R2: (Finland) Mikko Pajunen; R2: (Finland) Jani Salo	2011 British Rally Championship
British Rally Championship	Ladies: (United Kingdom) Louise Cook	2011 British Rally Championship
Canadian Rally Championship	(Canada) Antoine L'Estage	2011 Canadian Rally Championship
Canadian Rally Championship	Co-Drivers: (Canada) Nathalie Richard	2011 Canadian Rally Championship
Central European Zone Rally Championship	Class 2: (Poland) Michał Sołowow	2011 Central European Zone Rally Championship
Central European Zone Rally Championship	Production: (Poland) Wojciech Chuchala	2011 Central European Zone Rally Championship
Central European Zone Rally Championship	2WD: (Poland) Jan Chmielewski	2011 Central European Zone Rally Championship
Central European Zone Rally Championship	Historic: (Italy) Maurizio Pagella	2011 Central European Zone Rally Championship
Codasur South American Rally Championship	(Paraguay) Gustavo Saba	
Czech Rally Championship	(Czech Republic) Roman Kresta	2011 Czech Rally Championship
Czech Rally Championship	Co-Drivers: (Czech Republic) Petr Gross	2011 Czech Rally Championship
Deutsche Rallye Meisterschaft	(Germany) Sandro Wallenwein	
Estonian Rally Championship	(Latvia) Jānis Vorobjovs	2011 Estonian Rally Championship
Estonian Rally Championship	Co-Drivers: (Latvia) Guntars Zicāns	2011 Estonian Rally Championship
European Rally Championship	(Italy) Luca Rossetti	2011 European Rally Championship
European Rally Championship	Co-Drivers: (Italy) Matteo Chiarcossi	2011 European Rally Championship
French Rally Championship	(France) Gilles Nantet	
Hungarian Rally Championship	(Hungary) György Aschenbrenner	
Hungarian Rally Championship	Co-Drivers: (Hungary) Zsuzsa Pikó	
Indian National Rally Championship	(India) Gaurav Gill	
Indian National Rally Championship	Co-Drivers: (India) Musa Sherif	
Italian Rally Championship	(Italy) Paolo Andreucci	
Italian Rally Championship	Co-Drivers: (Italy) Anna Andreussi	
Italian Rally Championship	Manufacturers: (France) Peugeot	
Middle East Rally Championship	(Qatar) Nasser Al-Attiyah	
NACAM Rally Championship	(Peru) Raúl Orlandini Griswold	2011 NACAM Rally Championship
NACAM Rally Championship	Co-Drivers: (Peru) Diego Zuloaga	2011 NACAM Rally Championship
New Zealand Rally Championship	(New Zealand) Richard Mason	2011 New Zealand Rally Championship
New Zealand Rally Championship	Co-Drivers: (New Zealand) Sara Mason	2011 New Zealand Rally Championship
Polish Rally Championship	(Poland) Kajetan Kajetanowicz	
Romanian Rally Championship	(Romania) Valentin Porcișteanu	
Scottish Rally Championship	(United Kingdom) David Bogie	2011 Scottish Rally Championship
Scottish Rally Championship	Co-Drivers: (United Kingdom) Kevin Rae	2011 Scottish Rally Championship
Slovak Rally Championship	(Slovakia) Jozef Béreš Jr.	
Slovak Rally Championship	Co-Drivers: (Slovakia) Róbert Müller	
South African National Rally Championship	(Zimbabwe) Conrad Rautenbach	
South African National Rally Championship	Co-Drivers: (South Africa) Robin Houghton	
South African National Rally Championship	Manufacturers: (Japan) Toyota	
Spanish Rally Championship	(Spain) Miguel Ángel Fuster	
Spanish Rally Championship	Co-Drivers: (Spain) Ignacio Aviñó	

=== Rallycross ===
Series	Driver	Season article
FIA European Rallycross Championship	Supercar: (Norway) Sverre Isachsen	2011 European Rallycross Championship
FIA European Rallycross Championship	Super1600: (Norway) Andreas Bakkerud	2011 European Rallycross Championship
FIA European Rallycross Championship	TouringCar: (Norway) Lars Øivind Enerberg	2011 European Rallycross Championship
British Rallycross Championship	(United Kingdom) Julian Godfrey	
Global Rallycross	(United States) Tanner Foust	

== Sports car and GT ==
Series	Champion(s)	refer
FIA GT1 World Championship	(Germany) Michael Krumm (Germany) Lucas Luhr	2011 FIA GT1 World Championship
FIA GT1 World Championship	Teams: (France) Hexis AMR	2011 FIA GT1 World Championship
FIA GT3 European Championship	(Italy) Francesco Castellacci (Italy) Federico Leo	2011 FIA GT3 European Championship
FIA GT3 European Championship	Teams: (Germany) Heico Motorsport	2011 FIA GT3 European Championship
American Le Mans Series	LMP1: (United States) Chris Dyson; LMP1: (United Kingdom) Guy Smith	2011 American Le Mans Series
American Le Mans Series	LMP1 Teams: (United States) Dyson Racing	2011 American Le Mans Series
American Le Mans Series	LMP2: (France) Christophe Bouchut; LMP2: (United States) Scott Tucker	2011 American Le Mans Series
American Le Mans Series	LMP2 Teams: (United States) Level 5 Motorsports	2011 American Le Mans Series
American Le Mans Series	LMPC: (Mexico) Ricardo González; LMPC: (United States) Gunnar Jeannette; LMPC: (United States) Eric Lux	2011 American Le Mans Series
American Le Mans Series	LMPC Teams: (United States) CORE Autosport	2011 American Le Mans Series
American Le Mans Series	GT: (United States) Joey Hand; GT: (Germany) Dirk Müller	2011 American Le Mans Series
American Le Mans Series	GT Teams: (United States) BMW Team RLL	2011 American Le Mans Series
American Le Mans Series	GTC: (United States) Tim Pappas	2011 American Le Mans Series
American Le Mans Series	GTC Teams: (United States) Black Swan Racing	2011 American Le Mans Series
Blancpain Endurance Series	GT3 Pro Cup: (Belgium) Gregory Franchi	2011 Blancpain Endurance Series
Blancpain Endurance Series	GT3 Pro Cup Teams: (Belgium) Belgian Audi Club	2011 Blancpain Endurance Series
Blancpain Endurance Series	GT3 Pro/Am Cup: (Netherlands) Niek Hommerson; GT3 Pro/Am Cup: (Belgium) Louis Machiels	2011 Blancpain Endurance Series
Blancpain Endurance Series	GT3 Pro/Am Cup Teams: (Germany) Vita4One	2011 Blancpain Endurance Series
Blancpain Endurance Series	GT3 Gentlemen Trophy: (France) Georges Cabannes	2011 Blancpain Endurance Series
Blancpain Endurance Series	GT3 Gentlemen Trophy Teams: (France) Ruffier Racing	2011 Blancpain Endurance Series
Blancpain Endurance Series	GT3 Cup: (Italy) Sergio Negroni	2011 Blancpain Endurance Series
Blancpain Endurance Series	GT4 Cup: (United Kingdom) Alex Buncombe; GT4 Cup: (France) Jordan Tresson; GT4 Cup: (United Kingdom) Christopher Ward	2011 Blancpain Endurance Series
Blancpain Endurance Series	GT4 Cup Teams: (United Kingdom) RJN Motorsport	2011 Blancpain Endurance Series
British GT Championship	GT3: (United Kingdom) Glynn Geddie; GT3: (United Kingdom) Jim Geddie	2011 British GT Championship
British GT Championship	GT4: (United Kingdom) Peter Belshaw; GT4: (United Kingdom) Marcus Clutton	2011 British GT Championship
Rolex Sports Car Series	DP: (United States) Scott Pruett; DP: (Mexico) Memo Rojas	2011 Rolex Sports Car Series
Rolex Sports Car Series	GT: (United States) Andrew Davis; GT: (United States) Leh Keen	2011 Rolex Sports Car Series
Trans-Am Series	TA1: (United States) Tony Ave; TA2: (United States) Bob Stretch	2011 Trans-Am Series
ADAC GT Masters	(France) Dino Lunardi (Greece) Alexandros Margaritis	2011 ADAC GT Masters
ADAC GT Masters	Teams: (Germany) Reiter Engineering	2011 ADAC GT Masters
ADAC GT Masters	Amateurs: (Switzerland) Marc A. Hayek	2011 ADAC GT Masters
Radical Australia Cup	(Australia) Edward Singleton	
Porsches
Porsche Supercup	(Germany) René Rast	2011 Porsche Supercup
Porsche Supercup	Teams: (Austria) Veltins Lechner Racing	2011 Porsche Supercup
Porsche Carrera Cup Germany	(United Kingdom) Nick Tandy	
Porsche Carrera Cup Germany	Teams: (Germany) Team Deutsche Post by Tolimit	
Porsche Carrera Cup Great Britain	(United Kingdom) James Sutton	2011 Porsche Carrera Cup Great Britain
Porsche Carrera Cup Great Britain	Teams: (United Kingdom) Redline Racing	2011 Porsche Carrera Cup Great Britain
Porsche Carrera Cup France	(France) Kévin Estre	
Porsche Carrera Cup France	Teams: (France) AS Events	
Porsche Carrera Cup Italy	(Italy) Alessandro Balzan	
Porsche Carrera Cup Italy	Michelin Cup: (Italy) Angelo Proietti	
Porsche Carrera Cup Italy	Teams: (Italy) Ebimotors	
Porsche Carrera Cup Italy	Under 25: (Italy) Marco Mapelli	
Porsche Carrera Cup Scandinavia	(Sweden) Robin Rudholm	
Porsche Carrera Cup Scandinavia	Teams: (Sweden) Xlander Racing	
Porsche Carrera Cup Japan	(Japan) Hideto Yasuoka	
Porsche Carrera Cup Asia	(Japan) Keita Sawa	
Porsche Carrera Cup Asia	Class B: (China) Jian Wei Wang	
Australian Carrera Cup Championship	(New Zealand) Craig Baird	2011 Australian Carrera Cup Championship
Porsche GT3 Cup New Zealand	(New Zealand) Daniel Gaunt	
Porsche GT3 Cup New Zealand	996 Cup: (New Zealand) Simon McLennan	

== Stock car racing ==
Series	Champion(s)	refer
NASCAR Sprint Cup Series	(United States) Tony Stewart	2011 NASCAR Sprint Cup Series
NASCAR Sprint Cup Series	Manufacturers: (United States) Chevrolet	2011 NASCAR Sprint Cup Series
NASCAR Nationwide Series	(United States) Ricky Stenhouse Jr.	2011 NASCAR Nationwide Series
NASCAR Nationwide Series	Manufacturers: (United States) Ford	2011 NASCAR Nationwide Series
NASCAR Camping World Truck Series	(United States) Austin Dillon	2011 NASCAR Camping World Truck Series
NASCAR Camping World Truck Series	Manufacturers: (United States) Chevrolet	2011 NASCAR Camping World Truck Series
NASCAR Canadian Tire Series	(Canada) Scott Steckly	2011 NASCAR Canadian Tire Series
NASCAR Canadian Tire Series	Manufacturers: (United States) Dodge	2011 NASCAR Canadian Tire Series
NASCAR Corona Series	(Mexico) Germán Quiroga	2011 NASCAR Corona Series
NASCAR K&N Pro Series East	(United States) Max Gresham	2011 NASCAR K&N Pro Series East
NASCAR K&N Pro Series West	(United States) Greg Pursley	2011 NASCAR K&N Pro Series West
ARCA Racing Series	(United States) Ty Dillon	2011 ARCA Racing Series
Turismo Carretera	(Argentina) Guillermo Ortelli	2011 Turismo Carretera

== Touring car racing ==
Series	Champion(s)	refer
World Touring Car Championship	(France) Yvan Muller	2011 World Touring Car Championship season
World Touring Car Championship	Manufacturers: (United States) Chevrolet	2011 World Touring Car Championship season
World Touring Car Championship	Independent: (Denmark) Kristian Poulsen	2011 World Touring Car Championship season
World Touring Car Championship	Independents Teams: (Germany) Liqui Moly Team Engstler	2011 World Touring Car Championship season
World Touring Car Championship	Jay-Ten Trophy: (Italy) Fabio Fabiani	2011 World Touring Car Championship season
Deutsche Tourenwagen Masters	(Germany) Martin Tomczyk	2011 Deutsche Tourenwagen Masters
Deutsche Tourenwagen Masters	Teams: (Germany) Abt Sportsline	2011 Deutsche Tourenwagen Masters
Stock Car Brasil	(Brazil) Cacá Bueno	2011 Stock Car Brasil season
British Touring Car Championship	(United Kingdom) Matt Neal	2011 British Touring Car Championship season
British Touring Car Championship	Independents: (United Kingdom) James Nash	2011 British Touring Car Championship season
British Touring Car Championship	Manufacturers: (Japan) Honda	2011 British Touring Car Championship season
British Touring Car Championship	Teams: (Japan) Honda Racing Team	2011 British Touring Car Championship season
British Touring Car Championship	Independents Teams: (United Kingdom) 888 Racing with Collins Contractors	2011 British Touring Car Championship season
European Touring Car Cup	Super 2000: (Italy) Fabrizio Giovanardi	2011 European Touring Car Cup
European Touring Car Cup	Super Production: (Serbia) Aleksandar Tošić	2011 European Touring Car Cup
European Touring Car Cup	Super 1600: (Germany) Thomas Mühlenz	2011 European Touring Car Cup
New Zealand V8s	(New Zealand) John McIntyre	2010–11 New Zealand V8 season
V8 Supercars Championship	(Australia) Jamie Whincup	2011 International V8 Supercars Championship
V8 Supercars Championship	Teams: (Australia) Triple Eight Race Engineering	2011 International V8 Supercars Championship
V8 Supercars Championship	Manufacturers: (Australia) Holden	2011 International V8 Supercars Championship
Fujitsu V8 Supercar Series	(Australia) Andrew Thompson	2011 Fujitsu V8 Supercar Series
Eurocup Mégane Trophy	(Switzerland) Stefano Comini	2011 Eurocup Mégane Trophy season
Eurocup Mégane Trophy	Teams: (Italy) Oregon Team	2011 Eurocup Mégane Trophy season
Eurocup Mégane Trophy	Gentlemen: (Belgium) David Dermont	2011 Eurocup Mégane Trophy season
ADAC Procar Series	(Germany) Johannes Leidinger	2011 ADAC Procar Series
ADAC Procar Series	Teams: (Germany) Engstler Motorsport	2011 ADAC Procar Series
Asian Touring Car Series	(Chinese Taipei) Jun San Chen	2011 Asian Touring Car Series
Asian Touring Car Series	Teams: (Chinese Taipei) Team AAI - Buddy Club	2011 Asian Touring Car Series
Australian Production Car Championship	(Australia) Stuart Kostera	2011 Australian Manufacturers' Championship
Australian Saloon Car Series	(Australia) Matt Lovell	2011 Australian Saloon Car Series
Australian Sports Sedan Series	(Australia) Tony Ricciardello	2011 Australian Sports Sedan season
Belgian Touring Car Series	(Belgium) Philippe Stéveny (Belgium) Didier de Radiguès	2011 Belgian Touring Car Series
Brasileiro de Marcas	(Brazil) Thiago Camilo	2011 Brasileiro de Marcas
Brasileiro de Marcas	Teams: (Brazil) Full Time Sports	2011 Brasileiro de Marcas
Brasileiro de Marcas	Manufacturers: (United States) Chevrolet	2011 Brasileiro de Marcas
Chevrolet Supercars Middle East Championship	SC09: (Bahrain) Raed Raffii	2010–11 Chevrolet Supercars Middle East Championship
Chevrolet Supercars Middle East Championship	SC06: (Bahrain) Ezra Idafar	2010–11 Chevrolet Supercars Middle East Championship
TC2000 Championship	(Argentina) Matías Rossi	2011 TC 2000 Championship
Renault Clio Cup
Renault Clio Eurocup	(France) Nicolas Milan	
Suzukis
Australian Suzuki Swift Series	(Australia) Allan Jarvis	2011 Australian Suzuki Swift Series
Suzuki Swift Sport Cup New Zealand	(New Zealand) Dane Fisher	

== Truck racing ==
Series	Driver	Season article
European Truck Racing Championship	(Germany) Jochen Hahn	2011 European Truck Racing Championship
European Truck Racing Championship	Teams: (Germany) Cepsa-Truck Sport Lutz Bernau	2011 European Truck Racing Championship
Fórmula Truck	(Brazil) Felipe Giaffone	2011 Fórmula Truck season
Fórmula Truck	Teams: (Brazil) RM Competições	2011 Fórmula Truck season
Fórmula Truck	Manufacturers: (Germany) Volkswagen	2011 Fórmula Truck season
Fórmula Truck	South American: (Brazil) Felipe Giaffone	2011 Fórmula Truck season
Fórmula Truck	South American Manufacturers: (Germany) Volkswagen	2011 Fórmula Truck season
V8 Ute Racing Series	(New Zealand) Chris Pither	2011 Australian V8 Ute Racing Series

== See also ==
- List of motorsport championships
