= 2023 Pacific F2000 Championship =

Edition of a motorsport championship

The 2023 Pacific F2000 Championship was the twentieth season of the Formula 2000-level single-seater championship across the Western US.

The season was held over six weekends from February to November 2023. Troy Shooter defended his championship title.

== Drivers ==
All drivers competed using F2000 cars as specified by the series regulations, powered by a 2L Ford Zetec engine on Hoosier Tires.

No.	Driver	Car	Rounds
2	(United States) Thomas Browne	2002 Van Diemen RF02	3–4
03	(United States) Mark Peller	2001 Van Diemen RF01	11–12
4	(United States) William Kincaid	2003 Van Diemen RF03	7–8
04	(United States) Greg Coffin	Mygale SJ07	9–10
7	(United States) Daniel Swanbeck	2001 Van Diemen RF01	1–8
9	(United States) Gary Peterson	2008 Van Diemen	1–2, 5–12
15	(United States) James Hakewill	2003 Van Diemen RF03	7–10
18	(United States) Tom Hope	2008 RFR FC	1–6, 9–10
21	(United States) Peter West	2005 Van Diemen RF05	All
31	(United States) Nick Kodenko	2005 Van Diemen RF05	1–2, 11–12
46	(United States) John Fabijanic	Piper DF5	1–4, 9–12
49	(United States) Greg Pizzo	2008 Van Diemen FR2000	1–2
51	(United States) Jerry Dutch Schultz	2001 Van Diemen RF01	1–6, 9–10
57	(United States) Nicholas Coe	2002 Van Diemen RF02	7–10
80	(United States) Jeff Pietz	2008 Van Diemen DP 08	5–8
81	(United States) Ken Roseboom	2008 Van Diemen DP 08	7–8
87	(United States) Troy Shooter	1999 Van Diemen RF99	1–2, 5–12
88	(United States) Lyn Greenhill	2002 Van Diemen RF02	5–10
96	(United States) Harindra de Silva	2006 Van Diemen RF2006-FC	1–2, 11–12
122	(United States) Hunter Tatman	2006 Van Diemen RF06	9–10

== Race calendar ==
The calendar, announced in November 2022, spanned six race weekends and featured four circuits.

Round	Circuit	Date	Supporting	Map of circuit locations
1	Buttonwillow Raceway Park, Buttonwillow	February 25	SCCA Super Tour; SCCA Majors Championship	2023 Pacific F2000 Championship is located in California
2	Buttonwillow Raceway Park, Buttonwillow	February 26	SCCA Super Tour; SCCA Majors Championship	2023 Pacific F2000 Championship is located in California
3	Thunderhill Raceway Park, Glenn County	March 4	SVRA Sprint Series; Trans-Am Series	2023 Pacific F2000 Championship is located in California
4	Thunderhill Raceway Park, Glenn County	March 5	SVRA Sprint Series; Trans-Am Series	2023 Pacific F2000 Championship is located in California
5	Thunderhill Raceway Park, Glenn County	May 5	SCCA Super Tour; SCCA Majors Championship	2023 Pacific F2000 Championship is located in California
6	Thunderhill Raceway Park, Glenn County	May 6	SCCA Super Tour; SCCA Majors Championship	2023 Pacific F2000 Championship is located in California
7	WeatherTech Raceway Laguna Seca, Monterey	July 29	San Francisco Region SCCA Series; Formula Car Challenge	2023 Pacific F2000 Championship is located in California
8	WeatherTech Raceway Laguna Seca, Monterey	July 30	San Francisco Region SCCA Series; Formula Car Challenge	2023 Pacific F2000 Championship is located in California
9	Sonoma Raceway, Sears Point	September 2	San Francisco Region SCCA Series; Formula Car Challenge	2023 Pacific F2000 Championship is located in California
10	Sonoma Raceway, Sears Point	September 3	San Francisco Region SCCA Series; Formula Car Challenge	2023 Pacific F2000 Championship is located in California
11	Buttonwillow Raceway Park, Buttonwillow	November 4	California Sports Car Club	2023 Pacific F2000 Championship is located in California
12	Buttonwillow Raceway Park, Buttonwillow	November 5	California Sports Car Club	2023 Pacific F2000 Championship is located in California

== Race results ==
Round	Circuit	Pole position	Fastest lap	Winning driver
1	Buttonwillow Raceway Park, Buttonwillow	(United States) Peter West	(United States) Troy Shooter	(United States) Tom Hope
2	Buttonwillow Raceway Park, Buttonwillow	(United States) Troy Shooter	(United States) Troy Shooter	(United States) Troy Shooter
3	Thunderhill Raceway Park, Glenn County	(United States) Jerry Dutch Schultz	(United States) Jerry Dutch Schultz	(United States) Jerry Dutch Schultz
4	Thunderhill Raceway Park, Glenn County	(United States) Jerry Dutch Schultz	(United States) Jerry Dutch Schultz	(United States) Jerry Dutch Schultz
5	Thunderhill Raceway Park, Glenn County	(United States) Jerry Dutch Schultz	(United States) Jerry Dutch Schultz	(United States) Jerry Dutch Schultz
6	Thunderhill Raceway Park, Glenn County	(United States) Troy Shooter	(United States) Daniel Swanbeck	(United States) Daniel Swanbeck
7	WeatherTech Raceway Laguna Seca, Monterey	(United States) Troy Shooter	(United States) Troy Shooter	(United States) Troy Shooter
8	WeatherTech Raceway Laguna Seca, Monterey	(United States) Troy Shooter	(United States) Troy Shooter	(United States) Troy Shooter
9	Sonoma Raceway, Sears Point	(United States) Hunter Tatman	(United States) Hunter Tatman	(United States) Hunter Tatman
10	Sonoma Raceway, Sears Point	(United States) Hunter Tatman	(United States) Troy Shooter	(United States) Hunter Tatman
11	Buttonwillow Raceway Park, Buttonwillow	(United States) Troy Shooter	(United States) Troy Shooter	(United States) Troy Shooter
12	Buttonwillow Raceway Park, Buttonwillow	(United States) Troy Shooter	(United States) Troy Shooter	(United States) Troy Shooter

== Championship standings ==
=== Scoring system ===
Two points were awarded for pole position and fastest lap. All started drivers that failed to finish inside the top 19 after completing 50% of the race were awarded one point.

Position	1st	2nd	3rd	4th	5th	6th	7th	8th	9th	10th	11th	12th	13th	14th	15th	16th	17th	18th	19th
Points	30	25	22	19	17	15	14	13	12	11	10	9	8	7	6	5	4	3	2

Each driver's worst result was dropped.

=== Drivers' Championship ===
Pos	Driver	BUT1		THU1		THU2		LAG		SON		BUT2		Pts
Pos	Driver	R1	R2	R3	R4	R5	R6	R7	R8	R9	R10	R11	R12	Pts
1	(United States) Troy Shooter	2	1			DNS	8	1	1	Ret	2	1	1	240
2	(United States) Peter West	3	(6)	3	3	3	5	4	6	5	6	4	3	214
3	(United States) Gary Peterson	5	5			4	4	5	5	2	7	3	4	186
4	(United States) Daniel Swanbeck	DNS	DNS	2	2	5	1	9	3					133
5	(United States) Tom Hope	1	2	DNS	DNS	2	3			6	9			129
6	(United States) Jerry Dutch Schultz	DNS	DNS	1	1	1	2			Ret	DNS			128
7	(United States) John Fabijanic	6	4	5	5					7	8	7	Ret	110
8	(United States) James Hakewill							2	2	Ret	3			73
9	(United States) Nick Kodenko	4	3									6	5	73
10	(United States) Hunter Tatman									1	1			66
11	(United States) Lyn Greenhill					DNS	7	7	7	3	Ret			65
12	(United States) Nicholas Coe							6	8	8	5			58
13	(United States) Mark Peller											2	2	50
14	(United States) William Kincaid							3	4					41
15	(United States) Jeff Pietz					DNS	6	8	9					40
=16	(United States) Thomas Browne			4	4									38
=16	(United States) Greg Coffin									4	4			38
18	(United States) Harindra de Silva	DNS	DNS									5	6	36
—	(United States) Greg Pizzo	DNS	DNS											—
—	(United States) Ken Roseboom							DNS	DNS					—
Pos	Driver	R1	R2	R3	R4	R5	R6	R7	R8	R9	R10	R11	R12	Pts
Pos	Driver	BUT1		THU1		THU2		LAG		SON		BUT2		Pts
