= 2011–12 New Zealand V8 season =

2011–12 New Zealand V8s season

Seasons
- ← 2010–11 2012–13 →

The 2011–12 New Zealand V8 season was the thirteenth season of the series, under the NZV8 guise. The season began at Pukekohe on 4 November 2011 and finished at the Hamilton Street Circuit on 22 April 2012 after six championship meetings and one non-championship event.

== Race calendar ==
Rnd	Circuit	Date	Map
2011			2011–12 New Zealand V8 season is located in New Zealand
1	Pukekohe Park Raceway (Pukekohe, Auckland Region)	4–6 November	2011–12 New Zealand V8 season is located in New Zealand
2	Powerbuilt Raceway at Ruapuna Park (Christchurch, Canterbury Region)	9–11 December	2011–12 New Zealand V8 season is located in New Zealand
2012			2011–12 New Zealand V8 season is located in New Zealand
3	Teretonga Park (Invercargill, Southland Region)	13–15 January	2011–12 New Zealand V8 season is located in New Zealand
4	Timaru International Motor Raceway (Timaru, Canterbury Region)	20–22 January	2011–12 New Zealand V8 season is located in New Zealand
5	Manfeild Autocourse (Feilding, Manawatū District)	10–12 February	2011–12 New Zealand V8 season is located in New Zealand
6	Taupo Motorsport Park (Taupō, Waikato)	9–11 March	2011–12 New Zealand V8 season is located in New Zealand
NC	Hamilton Street Circuit (Hamilton, Waikato)	20–22 April	2011–12 New Zealand V8 season is located in New Zealand

== Teams and drivers ==
- All teams must adhere to the series' car specification rules. All Holdens must be based upon the body shells of its VT, VX or VY Commodores, with upgrades available to replicate it to a VZ or VE. Similarly for Ford, their cars must be based upon the AU Falcon, with options to replicate the BA.

Manufacturer	Vehicle	Team	No	Driver	Rounds
Ford	Falcon (BF)	Angus Fogg Racing	2	(New Zealand) Angus Fogg	All
Ford	Falcon (BF)	Richards Team Motorsport	4	(New Zealand) Simon Richards	All
Ford	Falcon (BF)	Richards Team Motorsport	5	(New Zealand) Martin Short	All
Ford	Falcon (BF)	Ezybuy Racing	9	(New Zealand) Alan McCarrison	1, 5, NC
Ford	Falcon (BF)	Tulloch Motorsport	11	(New Zealand) Simon Evans	All
Ford	Falcon (BF)	Tulloch Motorsport	12	(Australia) Jason Bargwanna	All
Ford	Falcon (BF)	Dwayne Carter Racing	19	(New Zealand) Dwayne Carter	All
Ford	Falcon (BF)	Haydn Mackenzie Motorsport	20	(New Zealand) Haydn Mackenzie	1–3, 5
Ford	Falcon (BF)	Haydn Mackenzie Motorsport	20	(New Zealand) Steve Taylor	NC
Ford	Falcon (BF)	Penny Homes Racing	22	(New Zealand) John Penny	1, 6
Ford	Falcon (BF)	Edgell Performance Racing	26	(New Zealand) Tim Edgell	All
Holden	Commodore (VY)		6	(New Zealand) Geoff Short	NC
Holden	Commodore (VY)	Concept Motorsport	007	(New Zealand) Nick Ross	All
Holden	Commodore (VY)		8	(New Zealand) Kevin Williams	NC
Holden	Commodore (VY)	Paul Manuell Racing	15	(New Zealand) Paul Manuell	1
Holden	Commodore (VY)	Phil Blythe Motorsport	16	(New Zealand) Phil Blythe	1, 5–6
Holden	Commodore (VY)	Holden Haven Racing	40	(New Zealand) Bronson Porter	1, 5–6, NC
Holden	Commodore (VY)		52	(New Zealand) Trevor Parmenter	4
Holden	Commodore (VY)		63	(New Zealand) Ian Booth	1
Holden	Commodore (VY)		63	(New Zealand) Malcolm Budd	3–4
Holden	Commodore (VY)		63	(New Zealand) Struan Robinson	6, NC
Holden	Commodore (VY)	Pinepac Racing	70	(New Zealand) Andrew Anderson	5, NC
Holden	Commodore (VY)		74	(New Zealand) Ross Cameron	2–6
Holden	Commodore (VY)		80	(New Zealand) Matthew Clark	NC
Holden	Commodore (VY)	Silverfern Motorsport	82	(New Zealand) Michael Bristow	1

== Calendar ==
Round		Event	Circuit	Winning driver	Winning team
1	R1	Fujitsu 200	Pukekohe Park Raceway	(New Zealand) Tim Edgell	Edgell Performance Racing
1	R2	Fujitsu 200	Pukekohe Park Raceway	(New Zealand) Paul Manuell	Paul Manuell Racing
1	R3	Fujitsu 200	Pukekohe Park Raceway	(Australia) Jason Bargwanna	Tulloch Motorsport
2	R1	Mike Pero 200	Powerbuilt Raceway at Ruapuna Park	(New Zealand) Angus Fogg	Angus Fogg Racing
2	R2	Mike Pero 200	Powerbuilt Raceway at Ruapuna Park	(New Zealand) Tim Edgell	Edgell Performance Racing
2	R3	Mike Pero 200	Powerbuilt Raceway at Ruapuna Park	(New Zealand) Angus Fogg	Angus Fogg Racing
3	R1	BNT 200	Teretonga Park	(Australia) Jason Bargwanna	Tulloch Motorsport
3	R2	BNT 200	Teretonga Park	(New Zealand) Angus Fogg	Angus Fogg Racing
3	R3	BNT 200	Teretonga Park	(New Zealand) Angus Fogg	Angus Fogg Racing
4	R1	CRC 200	Timaru International Motor Raceway	(New Zealand) Angus Fogg	Angus Fogg Racing
4	R2	CRC 200	Timaru International Motor Raceway	(New Zealand) Simon Richards	Richards Team Motorsport
4	R3	CRC 200	Timaru International Motor Raceway	(New Zealand) Angus Fogg	Angus Fogg Racing
5	R1	Fujitsu 200	Manfeild Autocourse	(New Zealand) Tim Edgell	Edgell Performance Racing
5	R2	Fujitsu 200	Manfeild Autocourse	(New Zealand) Angus Fogg	Angus Fogg Racing
5	R3	Fujitsu 200	Manfeild Autocourse	(New Zealand) Tim Edgell	Edgell Performance Racing
6	R1	Dunlop Grand Finals	Taupo Motorsport Park	(New Zealand) Martin Short	Richards Team Motorsport
6	R2	Dunlop Grand Finals	Taupo Motorsport Park	(New Zealand) Simon Evans	Tulloch Motorsport
6	R3	Dunlop Grand Finals	Taupo Motorsport Park	(New Zealand) Tim Edgell	Edgell Performance Racing
NC	R1	ITM Hamilton 400	Hamilton Street Circuit	(Australia) Jason Bargwanna	Tulloch Motorsport
NC	R2	ITM Hamilton 400	Hamilton Street Circuit	(Australia) Jason Bargwanna	Tulloch Motorsport

== Championship standings ==
Pos	Driver	PUK			RUA			TER			TIM			MAN			TAU			HAM		Pts
Pos	Driver	R1	R2	R3	R1	R2	R3	R1	R2	R3	R1	R2	R3	R1	R2	R3	R1	R2	R3	R1	R2	Pts
1	(New Zealand) Angus Fogg	2	2	2	1	2	1	5	1	1	1	2	1	2	1	2	4	7	4	2	10	1193
2	(Australia) Jason Bargwanna	4	3	1	2	8	2	1	3	2	2	3	2	3	8	3	3	4	2	1	1	1098
3	(New Zealand) Tim Edgell	1	4	Ret	3	1	3	4	7	5	4	Ret	3	1	2	1	2	3	1	12	7	1002
4	(New Zealand) Martin Short	6	5	DNS	4	4	4	2	2	3	3	7	6	4	Ret	4	1	12	3	Ret	5	868
5	(New Zealand) Simon Richards	7	8	4	5	5	6	6	8	6	7	1	4	5	9	7	9	2	10			841
6	(New Zealand) Simon Evans	9	7	10	6	6	5	7	6	DNS	6	4	5	6	4	5	5	1	5	5	Ret	806
7	(New Zealand) Nick Ross	11	10	5	7	3	8	3	4	4	5	6	7	Ret	5	8	6	5	6	6	6	784
8	(New Zealand) Dwayne Carter	12	16	8	9	9	9	8	5	7	Ret	Ret	8	8	10	9	8	8	7	7	Ret	592
9	(New Zealand) Ross Cameron				10	10	10	9	9	8	8	8	10	12	13	13	11	9	9			467
10	(New Zealand) Haydn Mackenzie	8	12	6	8	7	7							Ret	6	6						325
11	(New Zealand) Bronson Porter	15	14	Ret										9	11	Ret	7	11	8	10	12	223
12	(New Zealand) Phil Blythe	14	15	Ret										11	12	12	10	10	Ret			198
13	(New Zealand) Paul Manuell	3	1	3																		195
14	(New Zealand) Alan McCarrison	Ret	11	9										7	7	10				4	3	183
15	(New Zealand) John Penny	5	9	7																		127
16	(New Zealand) Struan Robertson																12	6	11	11	11	103
17	(New Zealand) Andrew Anderson													13	3	Ret				3	2	132
18	(New Zealand) Trevor Parmenter										Ret	5	9									85
19	(New Zealand) Michael Bristow	10	6	DNS																		78
20	(New Zealand) Steve Taylor													10	Ret	11				9	8	63
21	(New Zealand) Ian Booth	13	13	Ret																		52
22	(New Zealand) Kevin Williams																DNS	DNS	Ret	Ret	4	0
-	(New Zealand) Geoff Short																			8	9	0
-	(New Zealand) Mathew Clark																			Ret	DNS	0
Pos	Driver	R1	R2	R3	R1	R2	R3	R1	R2	R3	R1	R2	R3	R1	R2	R3	R1	R2	R3	R1	R2	Pts
Pos	Driver	PUK			RUA			TER			TIM			MAN			TAU			HAM		Pts

Colour	Result
Gold	Winner
Silver	Second place
Bronze	Third place
Green	Points classification
Blue	Non-points classification
Blue	Non-classified finish (NC)
Purple	Retired, not classified (Ret)
Red	Did not qualify (DNQ)
Red	Did not pre-qualify (DNPQ)
Black	Disqualified (DSQ)
White	Did not start (DNS)
White	Withdrew (WD)
White	Race cancelled (C)
Blank	Did not practice (DNP)
Blank	Did not arrive (DNA)
Blank	Excluded (EX)
