= 2013 Codasur South American Rally Championship =

2013 Codasur South American Rally season

Seasons
- ← 2012 2014 →

The 2013 Codasur South American Rally Championship season was an international rally championship sanctioned by the FIA and run by the Confederacion Deportiva Automovilismo Sudamericana (Codasur). The championship is contested over four events held in four countries across South America, running from May to November. The championship was won by Paraguayan driver Gustavo Saba driving a Škoda Fabia. It was Saba's third consecutive title and he became the first three-time champion.

2013 saw a reduced calendar with Argentine event Rally de Misiones Posadas removed from the calendar and a much later start to the season with the Rally de Erechim in Brazil in May.

Reigning champion Gustavo Saba won all four events in his new car, a Super 2000 specification Škoda Fabia which replaced his Group N Mitsubishi Lancer. Mitsubishi Lancer driver Eduardo Peredo finished second in both the Rally de Santa Cruz and Rally de Minas while Ford Fiesta driver Miguel Zaldivar was second in both the Rally de Erechim and the Rally Transitapua. Peredo finished runner up in the championship ahead of Zalvidar on the basis of their other results.

== Race calendar and results ==
The 2013 Codasur South American Rally Championship is as follows:

Round	Rally name	Podium finishers				Statistics			
Round	Rally name	Rank	Driver	Car	Time	Stages	Length	Starters	Finishers
1	(Brazil) Rally de Erechim (17–19 May) - Results and Report	1	(Paraguay) Gustavo Saba	Škoda Fabia S2000	1:33:45.7	12	144.20 km	63	34
1	(Brazil) Rally de Erechim (17–19 May) - Results and Report	2	(Paraguay) Miguel Zaldivar	Ford Fiesta S2000	1:34:43.1	12	144.20 km	63	34
1	(Brazil) Rally de Erechim (17–19 May) - Results and Report	3	(Paraguay) Diego Domínguez	Mitsubishi Lancer Evo X	1:35:53.3	12	144.20 km	63	34
2	(Paraguay) Rally Transitapua (5–7 July) - Results and Report	1	(Paraguay) Gustavo Saba	Škoda Fabia S2000	1:48:24.7	12	179.55 km	65	43
2	(Paraguay) Rally Transitapua (5–7 July) - Results and Report	2	(Paraguay) Miguel Zaldivar	Ford Fiesta S2000	1:49:32.6	12	179.55 km	65	43
2	(Paraguay) Rally Transitapua (5–7 July) - Results and Report	3	(Paraguay) Augusto Bestard	Mitsubishi Lancer Evo X	1:51:50.9	12	179.55 km	65	43
3	(Bolivia) Rally de Santa Cruz (23–25 August) - Results and Report	1	(Paraguay) Gustavo Saba	Škoda Fabia S2000	1:07:19.9	8	96.79 km	91	43
3	(Bolivia) Rally de Santa Cruz (23–25 August) - Results and Report	2	(Bolivia) Eduardo Peredo	Mitsubishi Lancer Evo IX	1:09:53.5	8	96.79 km	91	43
3	(Bolivia) Rally de Santa Cruz (23–25 August) - Results and Report	3	(Bolivia) Manolo Ortiz	Mitsubishi Lancer Evo IX	1:13:33.3	8	96.79 km	91	43
4	(Uruguay) Rally de Minas (22–24 November) - Results and Report	1	(Paraguay) Gustavo Saba	Škoda Fabia S2000	1:42:17.4	10	176.70 km	64	41
4	(Uruguay) Rally de Minas (22–24 November) - Results and Report	2	(Bolivia) Eduardo Peredo	Mitsubishi Lancer Evo IX	1:44:01.3	10	176.70 km	64	41
4	(Uruguay) Rally de Minas (22–24 November) - Results and Report	3	(Uruguay) Alfredo Lago	Mitsubishi Lancer Evo IX	1:44:19.5	10	176.70 km	64	41

== Championship standings ==
The 2013 Codasur South American Rally Championship points are as follows:

Position	Driver	Vehicle	(Brazil) ERE	(Paraguay) TRA	(Bolivia) SNC	(Uruguay) MIN	Total
1	(Paraguay) Gustavo Saba	Škoda Fabia S2000	1	1	1	1	187
2	(Bolivia) Eduardo Peredo	Mitsubishi Lancer Evo IX	6	7	2	2	86.5
3	(Paraguay) Miguel Zaldivar	Ford Fiesta S2000	2	2		8	81
4	(Bolivia) Roberto Saba	Mitsubishi Lancer Evo IX	4	Ret	6	4	59
5	(Uruguay) Alfredo Lago	Mitsubishi Lancer Evo IX				3	31
6	(Paraguay) Diego Domínguez	Mitsubishi Lancer Evo X	3	4			28
6	(Paraguay) Augusto Bestard	Mitsubishi Lancer Evo X	Ret	3			28
6	(Ecuador) Rubén Cuenca	Subaru Impreza WRX STI	7	5	Ret	Ret	28
9	(Paraguay) Victor Rempel	Mitsubishi Lancer Evo X	5	Ret			23
10	(Bolivia) Juan Luis Ramirez	Mitsubishi Lancer Evo VII			3		22.5
11	(Paraguay) Luis Ortega	Mitsubishi Lancer Evo X	Ret	4			20
12	(Bolivia) Julio Cesar Carrillo	Mitsubishi Lancer Evo VIII			4		19
13	(Uruguay) Fernando Zuasnabar	Mitsubishi Lancer Evo IX				5	18
14	(Paraguay) German Maune	Mitsubishi Lancer Evo IX	Ret	6			15
14	(Bolivia) Fernando Blanco	Mitsubishi Lancer Evo X			5		15
16	(Uruguay) Gabriel Beltran	Mitsubishi Lancer Evo X				6	11
16	(Uruguay) Jose Levy	Mitsubishi Lancer Evo X				7	11
18	(Uruguay) Enrique Pereira	Mitsubishi Lancer Evo IX	8			Ret	7
18	(Paraguay) Blas Zapag	Mitsubishi Lancer Evo IX	Ret	8			7
18	(Paraguay) Alejandro Galanti	Toyota Corolla S2000	Ret	Ret			7
21	(Paraguay) Miguel Ortega	Mitsubishi Lancer Evo X		Ret			6
21	(Uruguay) Martin Canepa	Mitsubishi Lancer Evo IX				14	6
23	(Brazil) Ilo Diehl dos Santos	Mitsubishi Lancer Evo X	9	Ret		10	5
23	(Paraguay) Diego Yaluk	Mitsubishi Lancer Evo X		34		Ret	5
25	(Argentina) Miguel Losano	Ford Ka			8		4
25	(Bolivia) Ronald Montaño	Mitsubishi Lancer Evo X			12		4
25	(Uruguay) Rodrigo Zeballos	Mitsubishi Lancer Evo IX	Ret			23	4
28	(Paraguay) Marco Miltos	Mitsubishi Lancer Evo X Ford Fiesta S2000	Ret		Ret	9	3.5
28	(Bolivia) Daniel Canedo	Mitsubishi Lancer Evo VIII			Ret		3.5
30	(Bolivia) Luis Barbery Paz	Mitsubishi Lancer Evo IX			10		3
31	(Argentina) Cristian Rosiak	Mitsubishi Lancer Evo IX		9			2
31	(Brazil) Jose Barros Neto	Mitsubishi Lancer Evo IX	Ret				2
31	(Bolivia) Rodrigo Virreira	Subaru Impreza WRX STi	Ret		Ret		2
31	(Uruguay) Jose Massola	Ford Focus SVT	Ret	16	9	Ret	2
35	(Brazil) Luis Tedesco	Fiat Palio	10	12			1
35	(Paraguay) Miguel Vazquez	Mitsubishi Lancer Evo X	Ret	10			1

Key
Colour	Result
Gold	Winner
Silver	2nd place
Bronze	3rd place
Green	Points finish
Blue	Non-points finish
Blue	Non-classified finish (NC)
Purple	Did not finish (Ret)
Black	Excluded (EX)
Black	Disqualified (DSQ)
White	Did not start (DNS)
White	Cancelled (C)
Blank	Withdrew entry from the event (WD)
