= Jimmy Owens (racing driver) =

American racing driver

- Nationality: American
- Born: February 3, 1972 (age 54) Newport, Tennessee

Lucas Oil Late Model Dirt Series career
- Current team: Koehler Motorsports
- Car number: No. 20
- Engine: Vic Hill
- Championships: four (2011, 2012, 2013, 2020)
- Wins: 69 (as of June 28, 2020)
- Best finish: 1st in 2011, 2012, 2013, and 2020
- Finished last season: 1st
- Statistics up to date as of June 27, 2021.

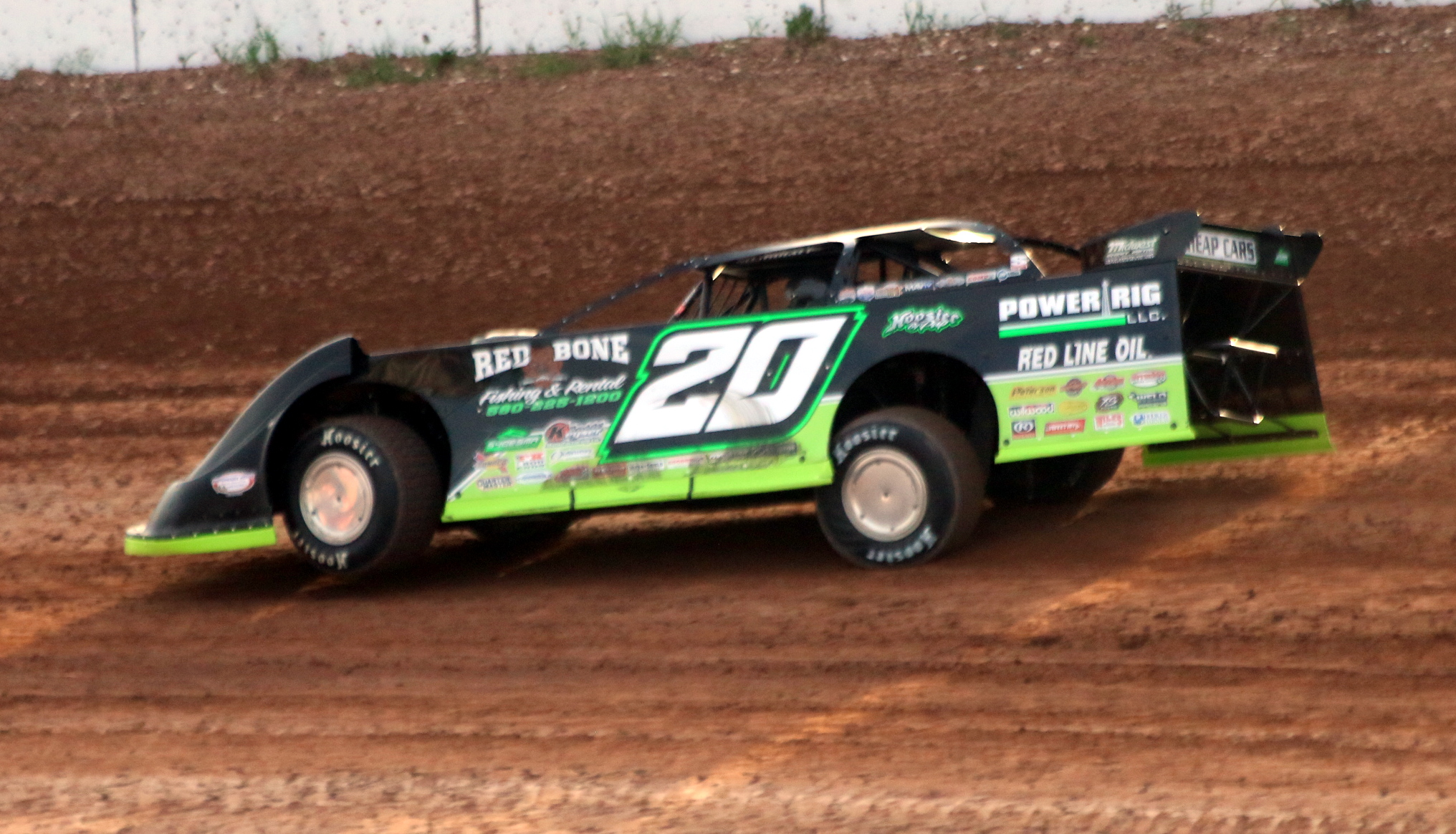
Owens racing in 2018

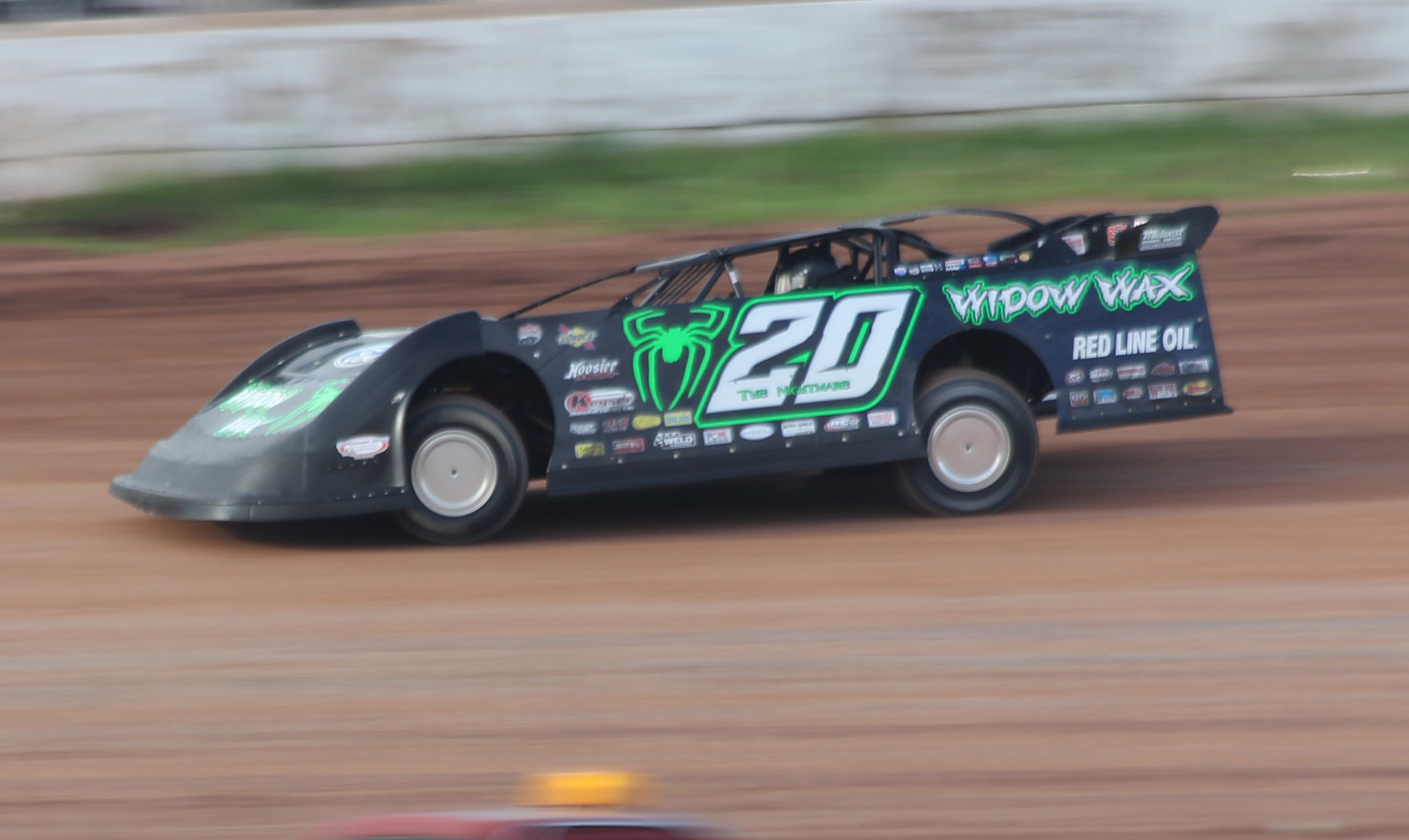
Owen's Lucas Oil Late Model Dirt Series car in 2015

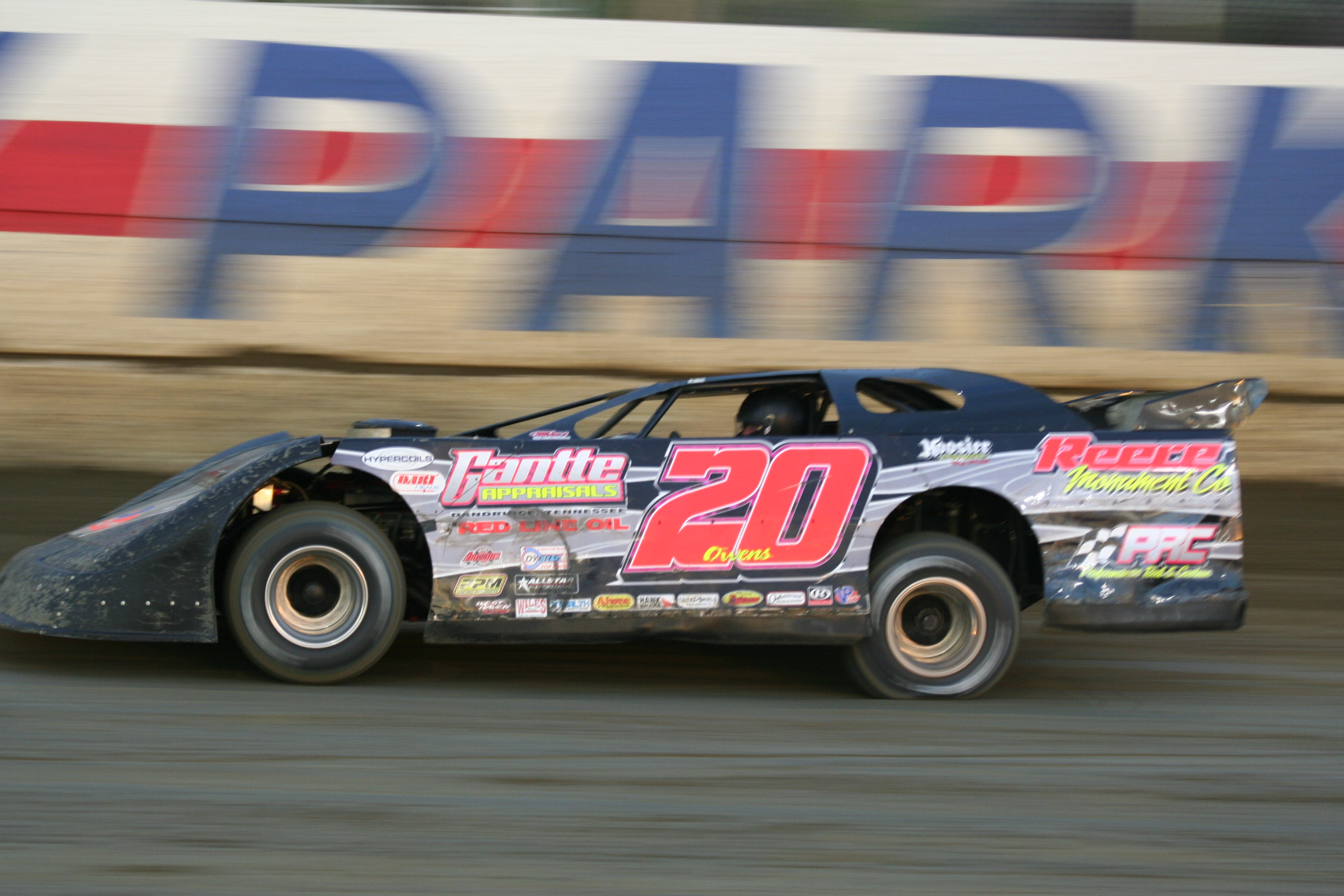
Owens' dirt late model at the 2008 East Bay Winternationals

Jimmy Owens is a professional dirt late model driver from Newport, Tennessee. Owens after starting out as a modified driver before switching to Late Models. Owens raced as an "Outlaw" by choosing to race selected larger purse events and not racing on national tours for several years. He eventually raced changed to national tours on the Lucas Oil Late Model Dirt Series and won its championship in 2011, 2012, 2013, and 2020. Owens is nicknamed "The Newport Nightmare" and "The O Show."

== Racing career ==
Owens won four UMP Modified National Championships before moving up to super late models where he has also had success. Rather than following a touring series, he opted for the "outlaw" mentality, traveling where he chooses and hitting all of the crown jewels. He stopped racing "outlaw" and joined the Lucas Oil Late Model Dirt Series to become series' the 2011 national champion. He repeated as champion in 2012, 2013, and 2020.

Owens' 2007 season included winning The World 100 at Eldora Speedway, the 25th Annual North/South 100 at Florence Speedway in Florence, KY, the Blue/Gray 100 in Gaffney, SC, Racefest World Championship in Mineral Wells, WV, and the Crate World Championship in Tampa, FL. Owens won a total of seventeen races in 2007.

In 2008, Owens won the $40,000 to win Hillbilly 100 at Tyler County (WV) Speedway.

In 2009, Owens won the 15th Annual Dirt Late Model Dream at Eldora Speedway, a win that was worth $100,000. He went on later in the year to capture the 17th Annual Comp Cams Topless 100 at Batesville (AR) Speedway, a win worth $42,000. Owens won the Topless 100 in 2014 and 2020.

Owens joined the Lucas Oil Late Model Dirt Series and won the 2011 championship over Bloomquist. He won eight races, had 32 top-fives and 35 top-tens. Owens' 2011 wins include the World 100 and the Show-Me 100. He won the Show-Me 100 again in 2012 and 2013. Owens won the 2018 and 2019 Knoxville Raceway Late Model Nationals.

Owens won at least 20 events in 2020. He won four consecutive Lucas Oil events in June 2020 at which point he had 69 career victories in Lucas Oil competition. In his career (as of 2021), he has over 560 modified and late model victories.

== Career Awards ==
Owens was inducted in the National Dirt Late Model Hall of Fame on 2012.
