= Pacific F2000 =

- Category: Single seater
- Country: United States
- Inaugural season: 2004
- Drivers: 11
- Tyre suppliers: Hoosier
- Drivers' champion: Troy Shooter
- Teams' champion: Troy Shooter
- Official website: www.pacificf2000.com

Hoosier Racing Tires presents the Pacific F2000 Championship is an American open-wheel racing series designed for the entry-level and veteran-level drivers. The Pacific F2000 Racing Series offers 12 racing opportunities over six weekends at leading West Coast venues such as WeatherTech Raceway Laguna Seca, Sonoma Raceway, Buttonwillow Raceway Park and Thunderhill Raceway Park.

The Pacific F2000 Racing series is a step up from F1600, with the introduction of wings, increased power, and larger racing tires. The suspension geometry of a modern F2000 car is as sophisticated as those in many more well known races and offers training for drivers, engineers and mechanics. Because formula and not spec cars are used there are numerous chassis designs and multiple motors allowed, which provides an opportunity to test new designs. At the same time, there are restrictions to keep costs in check. F2000 originated in England in 1974 and has been part of the careers of many of the sport’s top names. In North America, its alumni include Sam Hornish Jr., Buddy Rice, Paul Tracy, Jimmy Vasser, and Dan Wheldon. Graduates of PacificF2000 Racing since its inception in 2004 include J.R. Hildebrand, who won the 2009 Firestone Indy Lights Championship and drove the No. 4 National Guard car in the IZOD IndyCar Series; two-time IMSA prototype champion (2014 & 2016) Dane Cameron; Jason Bowles, who won the 2011 NASCAR Toyota All-Star Showdown at Irwindale Speedway; and Thomas Merrill, 2022 Trans-Am TA2 Champion.

== Format ==
Each race weekend consists of free practice on Friday, qualifying and race #1 on Saturday, qualifying and race #2 on Sunday. Each race is between 25-30 minutes.

== Road to Indy Shootout ==
On August 1, 2015 it was announced that Pacific F2000 would be an official partner in the Road to Indy series along with 9 other entry-level race series. Starting in the 2016 season, the champion of the series will gain entry to a shootout against the champions from competing series for the chance to win a $200,000 scholarship and entry in the U.S. F2000 National Championship.

== Current Racetracks ==
- Buttonwillow Raceway Park
- Thunderhill Raceway Park
- WeatherTech Raceway Laguna Seca
- Sonoma Raceway

== Past Racetracks ==
- Las Vegas Motor Speedway
- Utah Motorsports Park
- Portland International Raceway
- Willow Springs International Raceway
- Auto Club Speedway

== Alumni ==
Graduates of Pacific F2000 Racing include J.R. Hildebrand who won the 2009 Firestone Indy Lights Championship and drove the No. 4 National Guard car in the IZOD IndyCar Series; seven-time Indy Car winner Colton Herta, son of Champ Car driver Bryan Herta and the youngest driver to win an IndyCar event; two-time IMSA prototype champion (2014 & 2016) Dane Cameron; David Chang, co-owner of Jackie Chan racing; 2018 Indy Lights Champion Patricio (Pato) O'Ward; Jason Bowles, who won the 2011 NASCAR Toyota All-Star Showdown at Irwindale Speedway; and Thomas Merrill, 2022 Trans-Am TA2 Champion. Other notables who've raced with the series include tech luminary Bill Kincaid, creator of Apple's I-Tunes; current manager of Buttonwillow Raceway Park Les Phillips, and previous "Best Shoes" winner Peter West.

== Past Drivers Champions ==
- 2004 - Brad Jaeger
- 2005 - Mike Forest
- 2006 - Robert Podlesni
- 2007 - Patrick Barrett
- 2008 - Jeff Westphal
- 2009 - Robert Podlesni
- 2010 - Scott Rarick
- 2011 - Conner Ford
- 2012 - Bobby Kelley
- 2013 - Bob Negron
- 2014 - Andrew Evans
- 2015 - Tom Hope
- 2016 - Tim de Silva
- 2017 - Mitch Egner
- 2018 - Jason Reichert
- 2019 - Jason Reichert
- 2020 - Tom Hope
- 2021 - Robert Armington
- 2022 - Troy Shooter
- 2023 - Troy Shooter
- 2024 - Troy Shooter
- 2025 - Jase Petty

== See also ==
- Formula Ford
- F2000 Championship Series
