= 2015 Codasur South American Rally Championship =

2015 Codasur South American Rally season

Seasons
- ← 2014 2016 →

The 2015 Codasur South American Rally Championship is an international rally championship sanctioned by the FIA and run by the Confederacion Deportiva Automovilismo Sudamericana (Codasur). The championship was contested over five events held in five South American countries from April to November.

== Event calendar and results ==
The 2015 Codasur South American Rally Championship was as follows:

Round	Rally name	Podium finishers				Statistics			
Round	Rally name	Rank	Driver	Car	Time	Stages	Length	Starters	Finishers
1	Rally Argentina Codasur (23–26 April)	1	(Paraguay) Diego Domínguez	Ford Fiesta R5	4:00:33.1	12	315.86 km	40	13
1	Rally Argentina Codasur (23–26 April)	2	(Paraguay) Gustavo Saba	Škoda Fabia S2000	4:03:05.5	12	315.86 km	40	13
1	Rally Argentina Codasur (23–26 April)	3	(Argentina) Federico Villagra	Ford Fiesta MR	4:07:04.5	12	315.86 km	40	13
2	(Brazil) Rally de Erechim (22–24 May)	1	(Paraguay) Diego Domínguez	Ford Fiesta R5	1:47:46.3	13	159.40 km	52	24
2	(Brazil) Rally de Erechim (22–24 May)	2	(Brazil) Ulysses Bertholdo	Mitsubishi Lancer Evolution X	1:51:17.6	13	159.40 km	52	24
2	(Brazil) Rally de Erechim (22–24 May)	3	(Paraguay) Alberto Antebi	Ford Fiesta R5	1:52:51.4	13	159.40 km	52	24
3	(Paraguay) Rally Trans Itapua (26–28 June)	1	(Paraguay) Gustavo Saba	Škoda Fabia S2000	1:55:46.2	11	193.40 km	77	29
3	(Paraguay) Rally Trans Itapua (26–28 June)	2	(Paraguay) Alberto Antebi	Ford Fiesta R5	2:00:47.1	11	193.40 km	77	29
3	(Paraguay) Rally Trans Itapua (26–28 June)	3	(Paraguay) Miguel Ortega	Mitsubishi Lancer Evolution X	2:01:24.0	11	193.40 km	77	29
4	(Bolivia) Rally de Santa Cruz (28–30 August)	1	(Paraguay) Diego Domínguez	Ford Fiesta R5	2:15:03.2	15	207.40 km	89	30
4	(Bolivia) Rally de Santa Cruz (28–30 August)	2	(Bolivia) Eduardo Peredo	Mitsubishi Lancer Evolution X	2:16:16.0	15	207.40 km	89	30
4	(Bolivia) Rally de Santa Cruz (28–30 August)	3	(Bolivia) Mariano Aguilera	Mitsubishi Lancer Evolution X	2:26:49.5	15	207.40 km	89	30
5	(Uruguay) Rally del Atlántico (21–23 November)	1	(Paraguay) Gustavo Saba	Škoda Fabia S2000	1:49:01.3	11	195,40 km	52	26
5	(Uruguay) Rally del Atlántico (21–23 November)	2	(Uruguay) Santiago Cigliutti	Mitsubishi Lancer Evolution IX	1:52:32.1	11	195,40 km	52	26
5	(Uruguay) Rally del Atlántico (21–23 November)	3	(Uruguay) Jose Levy	Mitsubishi Lancer Evolution X	1:52:46.0	11	195,40 km	52	26

== Championship standings ==
The 2015 Codasur South American Rally Championship points were as follows:

Pos.	Driver	Vehicle	(Argentina) ARG	(Brazil) ERE	(Paraguay) TRA	(Bolivia) SNC	(Uruguay) ATL	Total
1	(Paraguay) Diego Domínguez	Ford Fiesta R5	1	1	Ret	1		165.5
2	(Paraguay) Gustavo Saba	Škoda Fabia S2000	2	7	1	Ret	1	161
3	(Paraguay) Alberto Antebi	Ford Fiesta R5		2	2	Ret		65
4	(Uruguay) Rodrigo Zeballos	Mitsubishi Lancer Evo IX	15	3	Ret	4	5	63
5	(Paraguay) Didier Arias	Ford Fiesta R5	5	8	4	Ret		55
6	(Bolivia) Eduardo Peredo	Mitsubishi Lancer Evo X		6	Ret	2		54
7	(Paraguay) Oscar Bittar	Mitsubishi Lancer Evo X	8	9	7	8	7	49
8	(Paraguay) Augusto Bestard	Ford Fiesta R5		4	5	9		45
9	(Argentina) Federico Villagra	Ford Fiesta MR	3					39.5
10	(Uruguay) Santiago Cigliuti	Mitsubishi Lancer Evo IX					2	31
11	(Argentina) Miguel Ángel Baldoni	Peugeot 208 MR	4					30
12	(Uruguay) José Levy	Mitsubishi Lancer Evo X					3	29
13	(Bolivia) Mariano Aguilera	Mitsubishi Lancer Evo X				3		25
14	(Paraguay) Miguel Ortega	Mitsubishi Lancer Evo X			3			24
15	(Uruguay) Enrique Pereira	Mitsubishi Lancer Evo IX					4	21
16	(Bolivia) Mario Franco	Mitsubishi Lancer Evo IX				5		18
17	(Paraguay) Marcos Miltos	Ford Fiesta S2000			6	Ret	11	16
18	(Brazil) Fábio Dall'Agnol	Mitsubishi Lancer Evo X		5				15
18	(Uruguay) Fernando Zuesnabar	Mitsubishi Lancer Evo IX					5	15
20	(Argentina) Marcos Ligato	Chevrolet Agile MR	6					15
21	(Argentina) Augusto D'Agostini	Volkswagen Gol Trend MR	7					12
22	(Argentina) Miguel Lozano	Ford Ka			Ret	6	Ret	10
23	(Uruguay) Gabriel Beltrán	Mitsubishi Lancer Evo X					8	9
23	(Paraguay) Carlos Costa	Mitsubishi Lancer Evo X			8			9
25	(Argentina) Geronimo Padilla	Peugeot 208 MR	9					8
25	(Uruguay) Juan San Martín	Mitsubishi Lancer Evo X					9	8
27	(Paraguay) Alejandro Galanti	Toyota Corolla			9			7
27	(Argentina) Nicolás Madero	Fiat Palio MR	10					7
27	(Paraguay) Jacob Penner	Mitsubishi Lancer Evo X		10				7
30	(Paraguay) Adib Daher	Mitsubishi Lancer Evo X			10			6
30	(Argentina) Luis Gianaschi	Ford Ka	11					6
32	(Paraguay) Miguel Zaldivar	Ford Fiesta R5		11	Ret			5
32	(Argentina) Alejandro Cancio	Peugeot 207 MR	12					5
34	(Paraguay) José Luis Jacquet	Mitsubishi Lancer Evo X			11			4
34	(Argentina) Rodrigo Virreira	Mitsubishi Lancer Evo X		12				4
34	(Argentina) Nicolás Diaz	Ford Fiesta MR	13					4
37	(Bolivia) Julio Carrillo	Mitsubishi Lancer Evo VIII				10		3
37	(Uruguay) Diego Elola	Subaru Impreza WRX					10	3
37	(Argentina) Raúl Racca	Subaru Impreza WRX STi				11		3
37	(Argentina) Alejandro Tejedor	Ford Ka	14					3
41	(Brazil) Luiz Facco	Mitsubishi Lancer Evo X					11	2
41	(Paraguay) Sebastián González	Mitsubishi Lancer Evo X		13				2
41	(Brazil) Milton Pagliosa	Mitsubishi Lancer Evo IX		14				2
41	(Brazil) Luis Tedesco	Fiat Palio MR		15				2
41	(Argentina) Alejandro Menéndez	Volkswagen Gol Trend MR	16					2
46	(Argentina) Guillermo Bottazzini	Ford Fiesta	17					1.5
47	(Uruguay) Guillermo Arrieta	Mitsubishi Lancer Evo IX				12		1
47	(Paraguay) Luis Maldonado	Honda Civic			12			1

Key
Colour	Result
Gold	Winner
Silver	2nd place
Bronze	3rd place
Green	Points finish
Blue	Non-points finish
Blue	Non-classified finish (NC)
Purple	Did not finish (Ret)
Black	Excluded (EX)
Black	Disqualified (DSQ)
White	Did not start (DNS)
White	Cancelled (C)
Blank	Withdrew entry from the event (WD)
