= 2016 Codasur South American Rally Championship =

2016 Codasur South American Rally season

Seasons
- ← 2015 2017 →

The 2016 Codasur South American Rally Championship is an international rally championship sanctioned by the FIA and run by the Confederacion Deportiva Automovilismo Sudamericana (Codasur). The championship was contested over five events held in five South American countries from April to November.

The championship was won for the fourth time by Paraguayan driver Gustavo Saba. Saba won the final three rallies to win the championship on the final day of the rally overcoming countryman Diego Domínguez who had led the championship all season after winning the first two rallies. Uruguayan driver Rodrigo Zeballos won a close competition for third in the championship

== Event calendar and results ==
The 2016 Codasur South American Rally Championship was as follows:

Round	Rally name	Podium finishers				Statistics			
Round	Rally name	Rank	Driver	Car	Time	Stages	Length	Starters	Finishers
1	(Paraguay) Rally Trans Itapua (1–3 April)	1	(Paraguay) Diego Domínguez	Ford Fiesta R5	1:44:44.7	14	180.75 km	65	37
1	(Paraguay) Rally Trans Itapua (1–3 April)	2	(Argentina) Marcos Ligato	Škoda Fabia R5	1:44:59.9	14	180.75 km	65	37
1	(Paraguay) Rally Trans Itapua (1–3 April)	3	(Paraguay) Didier Arias	Škoda Fabia R5	1:45:17.4	14	180.75 km	65	37
2	(Brazil) Rally de Erechim (13–15 May)	1	(Paraguay) Diego Domínguez	Ford Fiesta R5	1:38:34.8	13	153.80 km	60	35
2	(Brazil) Rally de Erechim (13–15 May)	2	(Paraguay) Gustavo Saba	Škoda Fabia R5	1:39:29.6	13	153.80 km	60	35
2	(Brazil) Rally de Erechim (13–15 May)	3	(Paraguay) Alejandro Galanti	Toyota Etios R5	1:43:09.9	13	153.80 km	60	35
3	(Argentina) Rally de Catamarca (10–12 June)	1	(Paraguay) Gustavo Saba	Škoda Fabia R5	1:22:51.3	12	141.62 km	54	35
3	(Argentina) Rally de Catamarca (10–12 June)	2	(Paraguay) Diego Domínguez	Ford Fiesta R5	1:23:00.8	12	141.62 km	54	35
3	(Argentina) Rally de Catamarca (10–12 June)	3	(Argentina) Geronimo Padilla	Ford Fiesta MR	1:23:50.9	12	141.62 km	54	35
4	(Bolivia) Rally de Santa Cruz (26–28 August)	1	(Paraguay) Gustavo Saba	Škoda Fabia R5	1:15:19.0	13	161.79 km	71	32
4	(Bolivia) Rally de Santa Cruz (26–28 August)	2	(Bolivia) Marco Bulacia Wilkinson	Toyota Corolla Proto	1:18:19.4	13	161.79 km	71	32
4	(Bolivia) Rally de Santa Cruz (26–28 August)	3	(Paraguay) Diego Domínguez	Ford Fiesta R5	1:19:04.5	13	161.79 km	71	32
5	(Uruguay) Rally del Atlántico (24–27 November)	1	(Paraguay) Gustavo Saba	Škoda Fabia R5	2:07:26.1	11	221.40 km	49	26
5	(Uruguay) Rally del Atlántico (24–27 November)	2	(Paraguay) Didier Arias	Škoda Fabia R5	2:09:26.5	11	221.40 km	49	26
5	(Uruguay) Rally del Atlántico (24–27 November)	3	(Uruguay) Rodrigo Zeballos	Mitsubishi Lancer Evolution X	2:11:48.9	11	221.40 km	49	26

== Championship standings ==
The 2016 Codasur South American Rally Championship points were as follows:

Pos.	Driver	Vehicle	(Paraguay) TRA	(Brazil) ERE	(Argentina) CAT	(Bolivia) SNC	(Uruguay) ATL	Total
1	(Paraguay) Gustavo Saba	Škoda Fabia R5	Ret	2	1	1	1	201.5
2	(Paraguay) Diego Domínguez	Ford Fiesta R5	1	1	2	2	4	192
3	(Uruguay) Rodrigo Zeballos	Mitsubishi Lancer Evo X	12	8	8	4	3	86.5
4	(Paraguay) Didier Arias	Škoda Fabia R5	3				2	82
5	(Bolivia) Roberto Saba	Mitsubishi Lancer Evo X	7	Ret	7	Ret	5	59
6	(Argentina) Marcos Ligato	Škoda Fabia R5; Chevrolet Agile MR	2		5			54
7	(Argentina) Federico Villagra	Ford Fiesta MR			3			28
8	(Paraguay) Alejandro Galanti	Toyota Etios R5	13	3				27
9	(Bolivia) Sebastian Franco	Mitsubishi Lancer Evo X				3		26.5
10	(Uruguay) Gabriel Beltrán	Mitsubishi Lancer Evo X					6	25.5
11	(Paraguay) Augusto Bestard	Ford Fiesta R5	4					24
12	(Bolivia) Mariano Aguilera	Mitsubishi Lancer Evo X	Ret	7		5		20.5
13	(Paraguay) Miguel Ortega	Mitsubishi Lancer Evo X	5	Ret				19
14	(Argentina) Augusto D'Agostini	Volkswagen Gol Trend MR			4			17
14	(Brazil) Fábio Dall'Agnol	Mitsubishi Lancer Evo X		4				17
14	(Paraguay) Alberto Antebi	Ford Fiesta R5	7	Ret				17
17	(Paraguay) Tiago Weiler	Mitsubishi Lancer Evo X	6					15
18	(Bolivia) Esteban Eid	Mitsubishi Lancer Evo X	Ret			6		14
19	(Uruguay) Enrique Pereira	Mitsubishi Lancer Evo IX; Mitsubishi Lancer Evo X	Ret	Ret			7	13.5
20	(Argentina) David Nalbandian	Chevrolet Agile MR			6			12
20	(Uruguay) José Levy	Mitsubishi Lancer Evo X	Ret	5			Ret	12
22	(Paraguay) Luis Ortega	Ford Fiesta R5	8	Ret				11
23	(Uruguay) Santiago Cigliuti	Mitsubishi Lancer Evo IX					Ret	10.5
24	(Bolivia) Julio Cesar Carrillo	Mitsubishi Lancer Evo VIII				7		9
24	(Uruguay) Nicolas Corallo	Mitsubishi Lancer Evo VIII					8	9
26	(Bolivia) Rolando Careaga	Mitsubishi Lancer Evo X				8		7
27	(Argentina) Tomas Garcia Hamilton	Fiat Palio MR			9			6
27	(Argentina) Nicolás Díaz	Ford Fiesta MR			10			6
27	(Uruguay) Guzman Rivero	Mitsubishi Lancer Evo X				9		6
30	(Uruguay) Fernando Zuesnabar	Mitsubishi Lancer Evo IX	Ret	6	14	Ret	Ret	5.5
31	(Argentina) Miguel Ángel Baldoni	Ford Fiesta MR			Ret			5
31	(Argentina) Alejandro Cancio	Chevrolet Agile MR			Ret			5
33	(Bolivia) Eduardo Peredo	Ford Fiesta R5	14					4
33	(Argentina) Luciano Bonomi	Renault Clio MR			11			4
35	(Spain) Fernando Alvarez Castellano	Ford Fiesta MR; Mitsubishi Lancer Evo X			17	9	10	3.5
36	(Brazil) Juliano Sartori	Mitsubishi Lancer Evo IX		Ret				2
37	(Paraguay) Federico Petersen	Mitsubishi Lancer Evo X	9					1
37	(Brazil) Rafael Tulio	Peugeot 207		9				1
37	(Bolivia) Sebastian Careaga	Mitsubishi Lancer Evo IX				10		1

Key
Colour	Result
Gold	Winner
Silver	2nd place
Bronze	3rd place
Green	Points finish
Blue	Non-points finish
Blue	Non-classified finish (NC)
Purple	Did not finish (Ret)
Black	Excluded (EX)
Black	Disqualified (DSQ)
White	Did not start (DNS)
White	Cancelled (C)
Blank	Withdrew entry from the event (WD)
