= 2014 Codasur South American Rally Championship =

2014 Codasur South American Rally season

Seasons
- ← 2013 2015 →

The 2014 Codasur South American Rally Championship was an international rally championship sanctioned by the FIA and run by the Confederacion Deportiva Automovilismo Sudamericana (Codasur). The championship was contested over five events held in five South American countries from April to November. 2014 saw an Argentine event restored to the calendar after it was dropped from the 2013 calendar. The season had an earlier start in April with Rally Trans Itapua and Rally de Erechim swapping places in the calendar with the returning Rally Argentina slotting in between the two.

The championship was won by Paraguay's Diego Domínguez, after he won the season's first three events. Domínguez won the championship by 28 points ahead of compatriot Gustavo Saba, and Bolivia's Eduardo Peredo. Saba had the better results in a tie-break with Peredo, having won the final event of the season, the Rally de Minas. The season's only other winner, Miguel Zaldivar, finished in fourth place in the drivers' championship, having finished as the best Codasur runner in the Rally de Santa Cruz.

== Event calendar and results ==
The 2014 Codasur South American Rally Championship was as follows:

Round	Rally name	Podium finishers				Statistics			
Round	Rally name	Rank	Driver	Car	Time	Stages	Length	Starters	Finishers
1	(Paraguay) Rally Trans Itapua (13–14 April)	1	(Paraguay) Diego Domínguez	Ford Fiesta R5	2:02:36.4	13	208.29 km	65	31
1	(Paraguay) Rally Trans Itapua (13–14 April)	2	(Paraguay) Augusto Bestard	Mitsubishi Lancer Evo X	2:06:46.8	13	208.29 km	65	31
1	(Paraguay) Rally Trans Itapua (13–14 April)	3	(Bolivia) Eduardo Peredo	Mitsubishi Lancer Evo IX	2:07:13.9	13	208.29 km	65	31
2	Rally Argentina (9–11 May)	1	(Paraguay) Diego Domínguez	Ford Fiesta R5	1:57:59.7	5	164.34 km	30	23
2	Rally Argentina (9–11 May)	2	(Paraguay) Gustavo Saba	Škoda Fabia S2000	1:58:02.0	5	164.34 km	30	23
2	Rally Argentina (9–11 May)	3	(Paraguay) Miguel Zaldivar	Ford Fiesta R5	2:00:16.1	5	164.34 km	30	23
3	(Brazil) Rally de Erechim (6–8 June)	1	(Paraguay) Diego Domínguez	Ford Fiesta R5	2:02:07.9	13	177.20 km	74	23
3	(Brazil) Rally de Erechim (6–8 June)	2	(Paraguay) Didier Arias	Ford Fiesta R5	2:03:14.2	13	177.20 km	74	23
3	(Brazil) Rally de Erechim (6–8 June)	3	(Bolivia) Eduardo Peredo	Mitsubishi Lancer Evo IX	2:06:13.8	13	177.20 km	74	23
4	(Bolivia) Rally de Santa Cruz (29–31 August)	1	(Bolivia) Marco Bulacia	Toyota Corolla	2:00:43.0	13	191.78 km	75	24
4	(Bolivia) Rally de Santa Cruz (29–31 August)	2	(Paraguay) Miguel Zaldivar	Ford Fiesta R5	2:01:00.5	13	191.78 km	75	24
4	(Bolivia) Rally de Santa Cruz (29–31 August)	3	(Bolivia) Eduardo Peredo	Mitsubishi Lancer Evo IX	2:01:47.2	13	191.78 km	75	24
5	(Uruguay) Rally de Minas (21–23 November)	1	(Paraguay) Gustavo Saba	Škoda Fabia S2000	1:50:56.2	12	190.20 km	61	33
5	(Uruguay) Rally de Minas (21–23 November)	2	(Uruguay) Rodrigo Zeballos	Mitsubishi Lancer Evo IX	1:55:50.4	12	190.20 km	61	33
5	(Uruguay) Rally de Minas (21–23 November)	3	(Uruguay) Juan Pablo West	Mitsubishi Lancer Evo IX	1:56:03.8	12	190.20 km	61	33

== Championship standings ==
The 2014 Codasur South American Rally Championship points were as follows:

Pos.	Driver	Vehicle	(Paraguay) TRA	(Argentina) MIS	(Brazil) ERE	(Bolivia) SNC	(Uruguay) MIN	Total
1	(Paraguay) Diego Domínguez	Ford Fiesta R5	1	1	1		Ret	144
2	(Paraguay) Gustavo Saba	Škoda Fabia S2000	Ret	2	Ret	3	1	116
2	(Bolivia) Eduardo Peredo	Mitsubishi Lancer Evo IX	3	4	3	2		116
4	(Paraguay) Miguel Zaldivar	Ford Fiesta R5	4	3	Ret	1		105
5	(Uruguay) Rodrigo Zeballos	Mitsubishi Lancer Evo X Mitsubishi Lancer Evo IX		Ret	4		2	59
6	(Paraguay) Augusto Bestard	Mitsubishi Lancer Evo X	2	8	5	Ret		58
7	(Paraguay) Didier Arias	Ford Fiesta R5	Ret		2	Ret		49
8	(Paraguay) Marco Miltos	Ford Fiesta S2000	EX		6	Ret	4	34
9	(Uruguay) Juan San Martín	Mitsubishi Lancer Evo X					3	31
10	(Bolivia) Luis Canedo	Mitsubishi Lancer Evo X				4		19
10	(Uruguay) Santiago Cigliutti	Mitsubishi Lancer Evo VIII					5	19
12	(Argentina) Raúl Martínez	Ford Fiesta MR		5				18
13	(Paraguay) Victor Rempel	Mitsubishi Lancer Evo X	5					17
14	(Brazil) Ilo Diehl dos Santos	Mitsubishi Lancer Evo X		Ret	7	Ret		16
15	(Paraguay) Luis Ortega	Škoda Fabia S2000	6					14
16	(Uruguay) Fernando Pujol	Renault Clio					5	12
17	(Argentina) Marcos Ligato	Chevrolet Agile MR		6				11
18	(Brazil) Ulysses Bertholdo	Mitsubishi Lancer Evo X	21		Ret	Ret	Ret	10
19	(Paraguay) Sebastián González	Mitsubishi Lancer Evo X	7					9
20	(Brazil) Alexandre Figueiredo	Volkswagen Gol Trend MR					7	8
20	(Argentina) Elder Tasca	Mitsubishi Lancer Evo X		7				8
20	(Uruguay) Enrique Pereira	Mitsubishi Lancer Evo IX	14	Ret			15	8
23	(Argentina) Claudio Marcelo Menzi	Ford Fiesta MR		Ret				7
24	(Uruguay) Andrés Fontana	Ford Focus					8	6
24	(Paraguay) Henry Klover	Mitsubishi Lancer Evo X	Ret		8			6
26	(Bolivia) Martin Sanchez	Mitsubishi Lancer Evo VII				Ret		5
26	(Argentina) Federico Villagra	Ford Fiesta MR		Ret				5
26	(Uruguay) José Levy	Mitsubishi Lancer Evo X					Ret	5
26	(Argentina) Alvaro Marchetto	Mitsubishi Lancer Evo X		10				5
30	(Bolivia) Julio Cesar Carrillo	Mitsubishi Lancer Evo VIII				Ret		4
30	(Paraguay) Federico Petersen	Mitsubishi Lancer Evo X	9					4
32	(Brazil) Jose Barros Neto	Mitsubishi Lancer Evo IX			Ret			3
32	(Argentina) Miguel Lozano	Ford Ka			16	Ret	Ret	3
32	(Uruguay) Fernando del Prestito	Mitsubishi Lancer Evo VIII					Ret	5
35	(Brazil) Leandro Brustolin	Peugeot 206			10			2
35	(Paraguay) Carlos Cortazar	Mitsubishi Lancer Evo X	Ret					2
35	(Paraguay) Reinaldo Kikuchi	Honda Civic					9	2
35	(Ecuador) Paul Zea	Mitsubishi Lancer Evo IX		9				2
35	(Brazil) Fábio Dall'Agnol	Mitsubishi Lancer Evo IX	12				Ret	2
35	(Argentina) Fernando Scarlatta	Citroën DS3 MR		19				2
41	(Brazil) Lucas Arnone	Peugeot 207			11			1
41	(Uruguay) Julio Durán	Ford Ka					10	1
41	(Paraguay) Ruben Irala	Mitsubishi Lancer Evo VII	13					1

Key
Colour	Result
Gold	Winner
Silver	2nd place
Bronze	3rd place
Green	Points finish
Blue	Non-points finish
Blue	Non-classified finish (NC)
Purple	Did not finish (Ret)
Black	Excluded (EX)
Black	Disqualified (DSQ)
White	Did not start (DNS)
White	Cancelled (C)
Blank	Withdrew entry from the event (WD)
