= Rally del Atlántico =

The Rally del Atlántico – Trofeo Ricardo Gorbarán is an international rallying race held in the Lavalleja and Maldonado departments in Uruguay since 1994. The event has been hosted in Punta del Este, Minas, San Carlos, Piriápolis and El Edén along the different editions, always on gravel roads. The event is a round of the Codasur South American Rally Championship and the Uruguayan Rally Championship since the first edition. Some years it has also been a round of the Argentinian Rally Championship.

Paraguayan drivers Alejandro Galanti and Gustavo Saba are the most successful drivers in the rally's history having each won five times.

== List of winners ==
Sourced in part from:

Year	Winner	Car
1994	(Paraguay) Marco Galanti	Toyota Celica GT-Four
1995	(Paraguay) Martin Masi	Ford Escort
1996	(Paraguay) Marco Galanti	Toyota Celica GT-Four
1997	(Uruguay) Gabriel Mendez	Toyota Celica GT-Four
1998	(Paraguay) Francisco Gorostiaga	Lancia Delta HF Integrale
1999	(Paraguay) Alejandro Galanti	Toyota Celica GT-Four
2000	(Argentina) Marcos Ligato	Subaru Impreza WRX
2001	(Argentina) Gabriel Raies	Toyota Corolla WRC
2002	(Paraguay) Diego Dominguez	Mitsubishi Lancer Evo VI
2003	(Paraguay) Francisco Gorostiaga	Toyota Corolla WRC
2004	(Argentina) Luis Perez Companc	Toyota Corolla WRC
2005	(Argentina) Juan Pablo Raies	Subaru Impreza WRC
2006	(Paraguay) Alejandro Galanti	Toyota Corolla WRC
2007	(Argentina) Roberto Sánchez	Subaru Impreza WRX STi
2008	(Paraguay) Victor Galeano	Mitsubishi Lancer Evo IX
2009	(Paraguay) Alejandro Galanti	Toyota Corolla S2000
2010	(Uruguay) Gustavo Trelles	Mitsubishi Lancer Evo X
2011	(Uruguay) Gabriel Beltran	Mitsubishi Lancer Evo X
2012	(Paraguay) Gustavo Saba	Mitsubishi Lancer Evo X
2013	(Paraguay) Gustavo Saba	Škoda Fabia S2000
2014	(Paraguay) Gustavo Saba	Škoda Fabia S2000
2015	(Paraguay) Gustavo Saba	Ford Fiesta R5
2016	(Paraguay) Gustavo Saba	Ford Fiesta R5
2017	(Paraguay) Miguel Zaldivar Sr	Škoda Fabia R5
2018	(Paraguay) Alejandro Galanti	Toyota Etios R5
2019	(Paraguay) Alejandro Galanti	Toyota Etios R5
2020–2021	cancelled for COVID-19 pandemic	
2022	(Paraguay) Augusto Bestard	Škoda Fabia R5
