= Rally de Erechim =

The Rally de Erechim, or Rally Internacional de Erechim is an international rallying event based in Erechim in the south state of Brazil, Rio Grande do Sul. The event is round of the Codasur South American Rally Championship; the Brazilian championship, the Brasileiro de Rally de Velocid and the Campeonato Gaúcho de Rally Velocidade.

The event was first run in 1998 and has been consistently a highlight of the Brazilian series. It was one of the foundation events of the Codasur South American Rally Championship, and apart from 2005 where it was briefly replaced by the Rally Bento Gonçalves, has been part of the championship since then. Paraguayan drivers Diego Dominguez and Gustavo Saba are the most successful drivers in the rallies history having each won four times.

== List of winners ==
Sourced in part from:

Year	Winner	Car
1998	(Brazil) Paulo Lemos	Volkswagen Golf Kit Car
1999	(Brazil) Mauricio Neves	Mitsubishi Colt
2000	(Brazil) Ulysses Bertholdo	Mitsubishi Lancer Evo V
2001	(Brazil) Ulysses Bertholdo	Mitsubishi Lancer Evo VI
2002	(Argentina) Carlos Malarczuk	Mitsubishi Lancer Evo VI
2003	(Brazil) Édio Fuchter	Subaru Impreza WRX
2004	(Brazil) Ramon Ferreyros	Subaru Impreza WRX
2005	(Brazil) Juliano Sartori	Mitsubishi Lancer Evo VII
2006	(Argentina) Roberto Sánchez	Subaru Impreza WRX STi
2007	(Argentina) Roberto Sánchez	Subaru Impreza WRX STi
2008	(Paraguay) Victor Galeano	Mitsubishi Lancer Evo IX
2009	(Argentina) Cristian Rosiak	Mitsubishi Lancer Evo X
2010	(Paraguay) Diego Dominguez	Mitsubishi Lancer Evo X
2011	(Paraguay) Gustavo Saba	Mitsubishi Lancer Evo X
2012	(Paraguay) Gustavo Saba	Mitsubishi Lancer Evo X
2013	(Paraguay) Gustavo Saba	Škoda Fabia S2000
2014	(Paraguay) Diego Dominguez	Ford Fiesta R5
2015	(Paraguay) Diego Dominguez	Ford Fiesta R5
2016	(Paraguay) Diego Dominguez	Ford Fiesta R5
2017	(Argentina) Marcos Ligato	Škoda Fabia R5
2018	(Paraguay) Gustavo Saba	Škoda Fabia R5
2019	(Paraguay) Gustavo Saba	Volkswagen Polo GTI R5
2020	cancelled for COVID-19 pandemic	
2021	(Brazil) Ulysses Bertholdo	Mitsubishi Lancer Evo X
2022	(Paraguay) Augusto Bestard	Volkswagen Polo GTI R5
2023	(Paraguay) Fabrizio Zaldivar	Hyundai i20 N Rally2
2024	(Paraguay) Fabrizio Zaldivar	Hyundai i20 N Rally2
2025	(Paraguay) Fabrizio Zaldivar	Hyundai i20 N Rally2
2026	(Bolivia) Sebastián Franco	Citroën C3 R5/Rally2
