= Rally Trans Itapúa =

International rally racing event in south-east Paraguay

- Status: Active
- Genre: Motorsporting event
- Frequency: Annual
- Country: Paraguay
- Inaugurated: 1981

The Rally Trans Itapua, is an international rallying event based in Encarnación, Itapúa Department in south-east Paraguay. The event is the opening round of the Codasur South American Rally Championship and a round of the Paraguayan Championship, the Campeonato Nacional Paraguayo.

The event was first run in 1981 and ran only briefly until 1983 as political instability swept Paraguay. Upon restarting the event in 1989, the event has run continuously since then apart from a brief rest in 2004–05.

Paraguayan drivers have won every event, even after the influx of international drivers of recent years. In particular the Galanti brothers have dominated the event. Alejandro Galanti has won the event seven times between 1998 and 2012 while older brother Marquito Galanti has taken four wins. All eleven victories were in Toyotas, spanning Group A, WRC and most recently Super 2000 technical regulations cars. 2008 saw Paraguay's first CODASUR champion Victor Galeano win the event. In 2013 triple Codasur champion Gustavo Saba finally broke through for a popular win at his home event.

Paragua is set to hold an WRC event from 2025 after signing a multi-year deal. The new rally called Rally del Paraguay is based in Rally Trans Itapúa and the first edition was held in September 2024 as a trial for the WRC debut in August 2025.

== List of winners ==
Sourced in part from:

Year	Winner	Car
1981	(Paraguay) Santiago Silguero	Datsun 160J
1982	(Paraguay) Santiago Silguero	Datsun 160J
1983	(Paraguay) Juan Viveros	Datsun 160J
1984–1988 not held
1989	(Paraguay) Alfredo Scheid	Volkswagen Golf 2.0
1990	(Paraguay) Eduardo Elizeche	Volkswagen Golf 1.6
1991	(Paraguay) Orlando Penner	Volkswagen Golf 1.8
1992	(Paraguay) Pedro Fadul	Volkswagen Golf 1.8
1993	(Paraguay) Orlando Penner	Volkswagen Golf 1.8
1994	(Paraguay) Orlando Penner	Volkswagen Golf 2.0
1995	(Paraguay) Marquito Galanti	Toyota Celica GT-Four
1996	(Paraguay) Marquito Galanti	Toyota Celica GT-Four
1997	(Paraguay) Marquito Galanti	Toyota Celica GT-Four
1998	(Paraguay) Alejandro Galanti	Toyota Celica GT-Four
1999	(Paraguay) Marquito Galanti	Toyota Corolla WRC
2000	(Paraguay) Alejandro Galanti	Toyota Celica GT-Four
2001	(Paraguay) Francisco Gorostiaga	Toyota Corolla WRC
2002	(Paraguay) Francisco Gorostiaga	Toyota Corolla WRC
2003	(Paraguay) Francisco Gorostiaga	Toyota Corolla WRC
2004–2005 not held
2006	(Paraguay) Alejandro Galanti	Toyota Corolla WRC
2007	(Paraguay) Alejandro Galanti	Toyota Corolla WRC
2008	(Paraguay) Victor Galeano	Mitsubishi Lancer Evo IX
2009	(Paraguay) Alejandro Galanti	Toyota Corolla S2000
2010	(Paraguay) Alejandro Galanti	Toyota Corolla S2000
2011	(Paraguay) Tiago Weiler	Mitsubishi Lancer Evo IX
2012	(Paraguay) Alejandro Galanti	Toyota Corolla S2000
2013	(Paraguay) Gustavo Saba	Škoda Fabia S2000
2014	(Paraguay) Diego Domínguez	Ford Fiesta R5
2015	(Paraguay) Gustavo Saba	Škoda Fabia S2000
2016	(Paraguay) Diego Domínguez	Ford Fiesta R5
2017	(Argentina) Marcos Ligato	Škoda Fabia R5
2018	(Paraguay) Diego Domínguez	Hyundai i20 R5
2019	(Paraguay) Diego Domínguez	Hyundai i20 R5
2020	cancelled for COVID-19 pandemic	
2021	(Paraguay) Gustavo Saba	Volkswagen Polo GTI R5
2022	(Paraguay) Diego Domínguez	Volkswagen Polo GTI R5
2023	(Paraguay) Fabrizio Zaldivar	Hyundai i20 N Rally2
2024	(Paraguay) Agustín Alonso	Volkswagen Polo GTI R5
