= 2018 Codasur South American Rally Championship =

The 2018 Codasur South American Rally Championship is an international rally championship sanctioned by the FIA and run by the Confederacion Deportiva Automovilismo Sudamericana (Codasur). The championship was contested over five events held in five countries across South America, running from March to November.

The championship was won for the sixth time by Paraguayan Skoda driver Gustavo Saba. Saba was second at the opening event in Paraguay before winning rallies in Argentina, Brazil and Bolivia, wrapping up the championship early. In Saba's absence Toyota driver Alejandro Galanti won the final event in Uruguay and was second in the championship. The only driver to beat Saba in 2018, Hyundai driver Diego Domínguez at the opening round in Paraguay, was third overall.

== Event calendar and results ==
The 2018 Codasur South American Rally Championship was as follows:

Round	Rally name	Podium finishers				Statistics			
Round	Rally name	Rank	Driver	Car	Time	Stages	Length	Starters	Finishers
1	(Paraguay) Rally Trans Itapua (15–18 March)	1	(Paraguay) Diego Dominguez	Hyundai i20 R5	1:23:37.6	13	152.72 km	72	35
1	(Paraguay) Rally Trans Itapua (15–18 March)	2	(Paraguay) Gustavo Saba	Škoda Fabia R5	1:24:55.8	13	152.72 km	72	35
1	(Paraguay) Rally Trans Itapua (15–18 March)	3	(Paraguay) Miguel Zaldivar Jr.	Škoda Fabia R5	1:26:21.7	13	152.72 km	72	35
2	Rally Argentina (26–28 April)	1	(Paraguay) Gustavo Saba	Škoda Fabia R5	1:45:30.2	9	122.48 km	19	12
2	Rally Argentina (26–28 April)	2	(Argentina) Alejandro Cancio	Škoda Fabia R5	1:45:31.6	9	122.48 km	19	12
2	Rally Argentina (26–28 April)	3	(Paraguay) Diego Dominguez	Hyundai i20 R5	1:46:27.1	9	122.48 km	19	12
3	(Brazil) Rally de Erechim (24–27 May)	1	(Paraguay) Gustavo Saba	Škoda Fabia R5	1:43:01.5	13	164.54 km	56	28
3	(Brazil) Rally de Erechim (24–27 May)	2	(Paraguay) Miguel Zaldivar Jr.	Škoda Fabia R5	1:45:45.3	13	164.54 km	56	28
3	(Brazil) Rally de Erechim (24–27 May)	3	(Paraguay) Alejandro Galanti	Toyota Etios R5	1:46:27.5	13	164.54 km	56	28
4	(Bolivia) Rally de Santa Cruz (23–26 August)	1	(Paraguay) Gustavo Saba	Škoda Fabia R5	1:27:13.5	14	152.66 km	47	24
4	(Bolivia) Rally de Santa Cruz (23–26 August)	2	(Bolivia) Marco Bulacia Wilkinson	Ford Fiesta R5	1:27:26.7	14	152.66 km	47	24
4	(Bolivia) Rally de Santa Cruz (23–26 August)	3	(Argentina) Augusto D'Agostini	Volkswagen Gol Trend MR	1:31:14.4	14	152.66 km	47	24
5	(Uruguay) Rally del Atlántico (22–25 November)	1	(Paraguay) Alejandro Galanti	Toyota Etios R5	1:49:34.9	9	190.10 km	35	17
5	(Uruguay) Rally del Atlántico (22–25 November)	2	(Uruguay) Guzman Rivero	Mitsubishi Lancer Evolution X	1:50:40.6	9	190.10 km	35	17
5	(Uruguay) Rally del Atlántico (22–25 November)	3	(Argentina) Augusto D'Agostini	Volkswagen Gol Trend MR	1:55:05.9	9	190.10 km	35	17

== Championship standings ==
The 2018 Codasur South American Rally Championship points were as follows:

Pos.	Driver	Vehicle	(Paraguay) TRA	(Argentina) ARG	(Brazil) ERE	(Bolivia) SNC	(Uruguay) ATL	Total
1	(Paraguay) Gustavo Saba	Škoda Fabia R5	2	1	1	1		175
2	(Paraguay) Alejandro Galanti	Toyota Etios R5	Ret	6	3	Ret	1	139.5
3	(Paraguay) Diego Domínguez	Hyundai i20 R5	1	3	11	Ret		95
4	(Argentina) Augusto D'Agostini	Volkswagen Gol Trend MR	11	8	15	3	3	91
5	(Paraguay) Miguel Zaldivar Jr.	Peugeot 208 MR	3		2			55
6	(Bolivia) Roberto Saba	Mitsubishi Lancer Evo X	6		4	4		53
6	(Uruguay) Rodrigo Zeballos	Mitsubishi Lancer Evo X	13	7	Ret	9	8	53
8	(Bolivia) Marco Bulacia Wilkinson	Ford Fiesta R5	Ret	Ret		2		47
9	(Uruguay) Federico Ensslin	Ford Fiesta R5					5	39
10	(Argentina) Alejandro Cancio	Škoda Fabia R5		2				36
10	(Argentina) Fernando Alvarez	Ford Fiesta MR					6	36
12	(Bolivia) Sebastian Franco	Mitsubishi Lancer Evo X	7		Ret	5		27
13	(Brazil) Andre Alegretti	Fiat Palio	Ret	10	Ret	21	10	26
14	(Paraguay) Miguel Zaldivar Sr.	Škoda Fabia R5	Ret		5			23
15	(Paraguay) Luis Maldonado Jr.	Ford Fiesta R5	4					21
15	(Chile) Cristobal Vidaurre	Škoda Fabia R5		4				21
17	(Argentina) David Nalbandian	Chevrolet Agile; Chevrolet Onix	Ret	5				19
18	(Argentina) Mario Martinez	Ford Ka	27	11	28	Ret	11	18
19	(Paraguay) Orlando Penner	Škoda Fabia R5	5					14
19	(Paraguay) Diego Dominguez Jr.	Peugeot 208 R2	16	9	8	12		14
21	(Paraguay) Humberto Dominguez	Mitsubishi Lancer Evo X	Ret		7			13
22	(Bolivia) Rodrigo Gutierrez Fleig	Škoda Fabia R5				8		11
22	(Bolivia) Mariano Aguilera	Mitsubishi Lancer Evo X	9		Ret	Ret		11
24	(Uruguay) Luigi Contín	Peugeot 208 R2			Ret		Ret	7.5
25	(Paraguay) Thiago Weiler	Škoda Fabia R5	Ret	Ret				7
26	(Paraguay) Jose Luis Jacquet	Škoda Fabia R5	8					6
27	(Paraguay) Fabrizio Zaldivar	Citroën DS3 R3T Max	Ret		10			4
28	(Argentina) Luis Arceluz	Mitsubishi Lancer Evo X		Ret				3
29	(Bolivia) Rodrigo Gutierrez Bravo	Peugeot 208 R2				18		2
30	(Paraguay) Fabricio Chiriani	Mitsubishi Lancer Evo X	10					1

Key
Colour	Result
Gold	Winner
Silver	2nd place
Bronze	3rd place
Green	Points finish
Blue	Non-points finish
Blue	Non-classified finish (NC)
Purple	Did not finish (Ret)
Black	Excluded (EX)
Black	Disqualified (DSQ)
White	Did not start (DNS)
White	Cancelled (C)
Blank	Withdrew entry from the event (WD)
