= 2019 Codasur South American Rally Championship =

The 2019 Codasur South American Rally Championship is an international rally championship sanctioned by the FIA and run by the Confederacion Deportiva Automovilismo Sudamericana (Codasur). The championship was contested over five events held in five South American countries from March to November.

Paraguayan Toyota driver Alejandro Galanti won the championship for the first time. Galanti won by a single point in a dramatic finish to the championship. Galanti won the season ending Rally del Atlántico ahead of second placed Hyundai driver Diego Domínguez who had been leading the championship going into the final rally. Domínguez won the first two events, the Rally de la Tierra Colorada and the Rally Trans Itapúa, and was second at the Rally de Erechim. Defending champion, Škoda driver Gustavo Saba, who had also still been in contention to win the championship, was third in the final event and the championship. Saba had won the Rally de Erechim. The Rally Santa Cruz de la Sierra was won by Bolivian Škoda driver Marco Bulacia Wilkinson.

Galanti was the first new Codasur champion since Domínguez won his first championship in 2014.

== Event calendar and results ==
The 2019 Codasur South American Rally Championship was as follows:

Round	Rally name	Podium finishers				Statistics			
Round	Rally name	Rank	Driver	Car	Time	Stages	Length	Starters	Finishers
1	(Argentina) Rally de la Tierra Colorada (1–3 March)	1	(Paraguay) Diego Dominguez	Hyundai i20 R5	1:31:41.3	11	172.11 km	25	18
1	(Argentina) Rally de la Tierra Colorada (1–3 March)	2	(Paraguay) Luis Maldonado	Škoda Fabia R5	1:32:19.4	11	172.11 km	25	18
1	(Argentina) Rally de la Tierra Colorada (1–3 March)	3	(Paraguay) Augusto Bestard	Ford Fiesta R5	1:32:44.1	11	172.11 km	25	18
2	(Paraguay) Petrobras Rally Trans Itapúa (5–7 April)	1	(Paraguay) Diego Dominguez	Hyundai i20 R5	1:41:27.6	13	176.94 km	66	30
2	(Paraguay) Petrobras Rally Trans Itapúa (5–7 April)	2	(Paraguay) Alejandro Galanti	Toyota Etios R5	1:41:36.0	13	176.94 km	66	30
2	(Paraguay) Petrobras Rally Trans Itapúa (5–7 April)	3	(Paraguay) Augusto Bestard	Ford Fiesta R5	1:43:20.3	13	176.94 km	66	30
3	(Brazil) Rally Internacional de Erechim (30 May–2 June)	1	(Paraguay) Gustavo Saba	Volkswagen Polo GTI R5	1:37:35.6	12	156.92 km	57	32
3	(Brazil) Rally Internacional de Erechim (30 May–2 June)	2	(Paraguay) Diego Dominguez	Hyundai i20 R5	1:37:52.9	12	156.92 km	57	32
3	(Brazil) Rally Internacional de Erechim (30 May–2 June)	3	(Paraguay) Alejandro Galanti	Toyota Etios R5	1:38:23.2	12	156.92 km	57	32
4	(Bolivia) Rally Santa Cruz de la Sierra (23–25 August)	1	(Bolivia) Marco Bulacia Wilkinson	Škoda Fabia R5	1:27:13.5	17	165.52 km	48	29
4	(Bolivia) Rally Santa Cruz de la Sierra (23–25 August)	2	(Paraguay) Gustavo Saba	Volkswagen Polo GTI R5	1:29:03.6	17	165.52 km	48	29
4	(Bolivia) Rally Santa Cruz de la Sierra (23–25 August)	3	(Paraguay) Alejandro Galanti	Toyota Etios R5	1:29:53.8	17	165.52 km	48	29
5	(Uruguay) Rally del Atlántico (29 November–1 December)	1	(Paraguay) Alejandro Galanti	Toyota Etios R5	1:47:28.5	10	193.50 km	46	19
5	(Uruguay) Rally del Atlántico (29 November–1 December)	2	(Paraguay) Diego Dominguez	Hyundai i20 R5	1:49:55.6	10	193.50 km	46	19
5	(Uruguay) Rally del Atlántico (29 November–1 December)	3	(Paraguay) Gustavo Saba	Volkswagen Polo GTI R5	1:50:10.1	10	193.50 km	46	19

== Championship standings ==
The 2019 Codasur South American Rally Championship points were as follows:

Points were awarded to the top ten finishers of each rally and for the top eight positions of each leg of each rally.

Pos.	Driver	Vehicle	(Argentina) COL			(Paraguay) RTI			(Brazil) ERE			(Bolivia) SCS			(Uruguay) ATL			Total
Pos.	Driver	Vehicle	L1	L2	Ov.	L1	L2	Ov	L1	L2	Ov	L1	L2	Ov	L1	L2	Ov	Total
1	(Paraguay) Alejandro Galanti	Toyota Etios R5	8	1	6	1	4	2	3	3	3	3	2	3	1	2	1	187
2	(Paraguay) Diego Domínguez	Hyundai i20 R5	2	6	1	2	3	1	2	2	2	7	3	5	2	3	2	186
3	(Paraguay) Gustavo Saba	Volkswagen Polo GTI R5	1	Ret	Ret	Ret	1	Ret	1	1	1	2	5	2	3	1	3	156
4	(Argentina) Augusto Bestard	Ford Fiesta R5; Ford Fiesta R2	4	5	3	3	5	3	4	4	4	5	Ret	Ret	4	8	4	118
5	(Bolivia) Roberto Saba	Škoda Fabia R5	5	3	4	5	6	4	5	5	5	4	4	4				89
6	(Bolivia) Marco Bulacia Wilkinson	Škoda Fabia R5										1	1	1				49
7	(Paraguay) Luis Maldonado Jr.	Škoda Fabia R5	3	4	2	Ret	2	Ret										40
8	(Argentina) Augusto D'Agostini	Volkswagen Gol Trend MR	7	7	7	?	?	9	6	6	6							30
9	(Bolivia) Mariano Aguilera	Škoda Fabia R5	6	2	5	4	?	11				Ret	DNS	Ret				29
9	(Bolivia) Eduardo Peredo	Mitsubishi Lancer Evo X				?	?	10	7	7	7	9	8	8				29
11	(Brazil) Andre Alegretti	Fiat Palio; Honda Civic EK4	19	15	17	?	?	Ret	26	26	20	Ret	DNS	Ret	20	16	13	24
12	(Paraguay) Juan Martin Masi	Ford Fiesta R5	10	8	8	7	?	5										19
13	(Bolivia) Carlo Garcia D'Rric	Mitsubishi Lancer Evo X	9	Ret	Ret	?	?	Ret	8	11	9	11	12	10				15
14	(Paraguay) Miguel Zaldivar Jr	Volkswagen Polo GTI R5				6	?	6										12
15	(Paraguay) Jorge Raul Garcia	Škoda Fabia R5				8	7	7										12
16	(Paraguay) Diego Dominguez Jr	Peugeot 208 R2	10	11	10	?	?	13	12	9	10	19	16	16				8
17	(Paraguay) Fabrizio Galanti	Toyota Etios				?	?	28	Ret	DNS	Ret				Ret	11	Ret	7.5
17	(Uruguay) Rodrigo Zeballos	Peugeot 208 MR													5	Ret	Ret	7.5
19	(Paraguay) Pedro Fadul	Škoda Fabia R5				?	8	8										6
19	(Chile) Alberto Heller	Ford Fiesta R2													9	Ret	Ret	6
19	(Brazil) Juliano Sartori	Volkswagen Polo MRT							10	8	8							6
19	(Uruguay) Martin Tellagori	Ford Ka													Ret	15	Ret	6
23	(Bolivia) Rodrigo Gutierrez Fleig	Škoda Fabia R5										Ret	DNS	Ret				2
23	(Bolivia) Jacob Penner	Mitsubishi Lancer Evo X	12	10	9													2
25	(Paraguay) Miguel Cabral	Honda Civic Type R	14	13	11	?	?	18				24	27	22				1

Key
Colour	Result
Gold	Winner
Silver	2nd place
Bronze	3rd place
Green	Points finish
Blue	Non-points finish
Blue	Non-classified finish (NC)
Purple	Did not finish (Ret)
Black	Excluded (EX)
Black	Disqualified (DSQ)
White	Did not start (DNS)
White	Cancelled (C)
Blank	Withdrew entry from the event (WD)
