= 2017 Codasur South American Rally Championship =

The 2017 Codasur South American Rally Championship is an international rally championship sanctioned by the FIA and run by the Confederacion Deportiva Automovilismo Sudamericana (Codasur). The championship was contested over five events held in five countries across South America, running from March to November.

The championship was won for the fifth time by Paraguayan driver Gustavo Saba. Saba only won the Rally de San Juan but with three second places that was enough for Saba to defeat Argentine driver Marcos Ligato by less than six points despite winning three rallies. Paraguayan driver Miguel Zaldivar Sr. was third in the championship after winning the final rally of the season in Uruguay.

== Event calendar and results ==
The 2017 Codasur South American Rally Championship was as follows:

Round	Rally name	Podium finishers				Statistics			
Round	Rally name	Rank	Driver	Car	Time	Stages	Length	Starters	Finishers
1	(Paraguay) Rally Trans Itapua (31 March–2 April)	1	(Argentina) Marcos Ligato	Škoda Fabia R5	1:46:54.5	14	187.04 km	65	30
1	(Paraguay) Rally Trans Itapua (31 March–2 April)	2	(Paraguay) Gustavo Saba	Škoda Fabia R5	1:47:09.2	14	187.04 km	65	30
1	(Paraguay) Rally Trans Itapua (31 March–2 April)	3	(Paraguay) Didier Arias	Škoda Fabia R5	1:47:21.2	14	187.04 km	65	30
2	(Brazil) Rally de Erechim (19–21 May)	1	(Argentina) Marcos Ligato	Škoda Fabia R5	1:41:06.1	12	152.02 km	72	45
2	(Brazil) Rally de Erechim (19–21 May)	2	(Paraguay) Gustavo Saba	Škoda Fabia R5	1:41:24.2	12	152.02 km	72	45
2	(Brazil) Rally de Erechim (19–21 May)	3	(Paraguay) Didier Arias	Škoda Fabia R5	1:41:55.7	12	152.02 km	72	45
3	(Argentina) Rally de San Juan (7–9 June)	1	(Paraguay) Gustavo Saba	Škoda Fabia R5	1:22:53.3	13	143.56 km	57	28
3	(Argentina) Rally de San Juan (7–9 June)	2	(Paraguay) Luciano Preto	Chevrolet Agile MR	1:25:28.9	13	143.56 km	57	28
3	(Argentina) Rally de San Juan (7–9 June)	3	(Argentina) Miguel-Angel Baldoni	Ford Fiesta MR	1:27:15.6	13	143.56 km	57	28
4	(Bolivia) Rally de Santa Cruz (25–27 August)	1	(Argentina) Marcos Ligato	Škoda Fabia R5	1:24:11.4	14	146.84 km	65	33
4	(Bolivia) Rally de Santa Cruz (25–27 August)	2	(Paraguay) Gustavo Saba	Škoda Fabia R5	1:24:13.4	14	146.84 km	65	33
4	(Bolivia) Rally de Santa Cruz (25–27 August)	3	(Bolivia) Marco Bulacia Wilkinson	Toyota Corolla Proto	1:26:13.4	14	146.84 km	65	33
5	(Uruguay) Rally del Atlántico (24–26 November)	1	(Paraguay) Miguel Zaldivar Sr	Škoda Fabia R5	2:16:22.6	13	228.50 km	62	26
5	(Uruguay) Rally del Atlántico (24–26 November)	2	(Uruguay) Guzman Rivero	Mitsubishi Lancer Evolution X	2:18:57.3	13	228.50 km	62	26
5	(Uruguay) Rally del Atlántico (24–26 November)	3	(Bolivia) Roberto Saba	Mitsubishi Lancer Evolution X	2:21:18.3	13	228.50 km	62	26

== Championship standings ==
The 2017 Codasur South American Rally Championship points were as follows:

Pos.	Driver	Vehicle	(Paraguay) TRA	(Brazil) ERE	(Argentina) SNJ	(Bolivia) SNC	(Uruguay) ATL	Total
1	(Paraguay) Gustavo Saba	Škoda Fabia R5	2	2	1	2	Ret	172
2	(Argentina) Marcos Ligato	Škoda Fabia R5; Chevrolet Agile MR	1	1	Ret	1	12	166.5
3	(Paraguay) Miguel Zaldivar Sr	Škoda Fabia R5	Ret	4	Ret		1	101
4	(Bolivia) Roberto Saba	Mitsubishi Lancer Evo X	7	5	4	Ret	3	88.5
5	(Bolivia) Eduardo Peredo	Mitsubishi Lancer Evo X	6	Ret	5	Ret	7	51
6	(Uruguay) Enrique Pereira	Mitsubishi Lancer Evo IX; Mitsubishi Lancer Evo X	17	7	18	5	5	50
7	(Argentina) Augusto D'Agostini	Volkswagen Gol Trend MR	12	14	6	Ret	6	39.5
8	(Uruguay) Rodrigo Zeballos	Mitsubishi Lancer Evo X	15	6			Ret	19
9	(Paraguay) Wilfried Klassen	Honda Civic Si		8	19	8	13	11
10	(Paraguay) Miguel Zaldivar Jr	Citroën DS3 R3T Max	16	22	17	Ret	8	6
10	(Paraguay) Jorge Maune	Changan Eado XT	24	11	20	7		6
12	(Uruguay) Fernando Zuesnabar	Mitsubishi Lancer Evo IX	13	20	Ret		Ret	2

Key
Colour	Result
Gold	Winner
Silver	2nd place
Bronze	3rd place
Green	Points finish
Blue	Non-points finish
Blue	Non-classified finish (NC)
Purple	Did not finish (Ret)
Black	Excluded (EX)
Black	Disqualified (DSQ)
White	Did not start (DNS)
White	Cancelled (C)
Blank	Withdrew entry from the event (WD)
