= Codasur South American Rally Championship =

International rally championship

- Category: Groups Rally; Super 2000; Group N
- Country: South America
- Inaugural season: 1997
- Tyre suppliers: DMACK
- Drivers' champion: (Peru) Ramon Ferreyros
- Co-Drivers' champion: (Peru) Ricardo Dasso
- Official website: www.rallyfiacodasur.com

The FIA CODASUR Rally Championship is an international rally championship which is run by Confederacion Deportiva Automovilismo Sudamericana (CODASUR) under the auspices of the FIA and held across South America, although some events in the northernmost reaches of South America compete in the NACAM Rally Championship zone rather than Codasur.

== History ==
Competing rallies have generally had short and intermittent histories within the championship, although Brazil's Rally de Erechim and Uruguay's Rally del Atlantico have been in almost every championship. Host nations have kept relatively constant; Brazil and Paraguay have hosted events in every championship, Bolivia and Uruguay all bar one and Argentina has only missed two years. Chile and Peru, former regulars have not hosted events since 2009 and 2010 respectively.

Paraguayan Gustavo Saba is the most successful in Codasur history with three consecutive titles from 2011 to 2013 and another three from 2016 to 2018. Argentine drivers Roberto Sanchez and Raúl Martínez have each won the championship twice as has Paraguayan driver Diego Domínguez. The championship had been dominated by drivers in Group N Mitsubishis and Subarus until R5 became more widely used, with Škoda Fabia and Ford Fiesta R5 cars now holding the most wins. The region has a strong history in Group N with Uruguayan Gustavo Trelles and Argentinian Gabriel Pozzo both winning the Production World Rally Championship forerunner about the time of the creation of the Codasur championship.

The 2019 championship took in events held in Argentina, Paraguay, Brazil, Bolivia and Uruguay. The 2020 and 2021 championships were cancelled as a consequence of the COVID-19 pandemic.

== List of events ==
Sourced from:

- Rally de Ca'aguazú, Paraguay (2004)
- Rally de Erechim, Brazil (2004, 2006–present)
- Rally Cochabamba, Bolivia (2004, 2008)
- Rally La Pampa, Argentina (2004)
- Rally Santiago, Chile (2004–06, 2008)
- Rally del Atlántico, Uruguay (2004–present)
- Rally Rio Ceballos, Argentina (2005–07)
- Rally Villarrica, Paraguay (2005)
- Rally de Santa Cruz, Bolivia (2005–07, 2010, 2012–present)
- Rally Bento Gonçalves, Brazil (2005)
- Rally Huancayo, Peru (2005–10)
- Rally Concepcion, Argentina (2005–07)
- Rally de Encarnación, Paraguay (2006–09)
- Rally Rio Negro, Chile (2006)
- Rally de Ouro Branco, Brazil (2007)
- Rally Cordillera, Paraguay (2008)
- Rally de Curitiba, Brazil (2009–10)
- Rally San Luis, Argentina (2009)
- Rally Sucre, Bolivia (2009)
- Rally Pucon, Chile (2009)
- Rally Argentina (2010, 2015–2018)
- Rally Trans Itapua, Paraguay (2010–present)
- Rally de la Yerba Mate, Argentina (2011)
- Rally de Misiones Posadas, Argentina (2012)
- Rally de la Tierra Colorada, Argentina (2019)

== Champions ==
Year	Driver	Car
2004	(Peru) Ramón Ferreyros	Subaru Impreza WRX STi
2005	(Argentina) Juan Pablo Raies	Subaru Impreza WRX STi
2006	(Argentina) Roberto Sánchez	Subaru Impreza WRX STi
2007	(Argentina) Roberto Sánchez	Subaru Impreza WRX STi
2008	(Paraguay) Victor Galeano	Mitsubishi Lancer Evo IX
2009	(Argentina) Raúl Martínez	Subaru Impreza WRX STi
2010	(Argentina) Raúl Martínez	Subaru Impreza WRX STi
2011	(Paraguay) Gustavo Saba	Mitsubishi Lancer Evo X
2012	(Paraguay) Gustavo Saba	Mitsubishi Lancer Evo X
2013	(Paraguay) Gustavo Saba	Škoda Fabia S2000
2014	(Paraguay) Diego Domínguez	Ford Fiesta R5
2015	(Paraguay) Diego Domínguez	Ford Fiesta R5
2016	(Paraguay) Gustavo Saba	Škoda Fabia S2000
2017	(Paraguay) Gustavo Saba	Škoda Fabia R5
2018	(Paraguay) Gustavo Saba	Škoda Fabia R5
2019	(Paraguay) Alejandro Galanti	Toyota Etios R5
2020	cancelled for COVID-19 pandemic	
2021	cancelled for COVID-19 pandemic	
2022	(Paraguay) Gustavo Saba	Volkswagen Polo GTI R5
2023	(Paraguay) Fabrizio Zaldivar	Hyundai i20 N Rally2
2024	(Paraguay) Fabrizio Zaldivar	Hyundai i20 N Rally2
