= 2021 Spanish Rally Championship season =

The Spanish Rally Championship is a rallying series run over the course of a year, that comprises tarmac and gravel surface events. 2021 is the 3rd season of the series. The season was due to begin in Rally Tierras Altas de Lorca, but got postponed. Instead, it started in Rallye Sierra Morena

== Changes ==
In 2021 the Spanish Gravel Championship and the Spanish Tarmac Championship mixed into the Spanish Rally Superchampionship. The two championships became the Spanish Gravel Cup and the Spanish Tarmac Cup.

The N5 Cup will make a return, after being shut down in 2020.

== Calendar ==
The Spanish Rally Championship features many different support categories:

- Clio Trophy Spain
- Dacia Sandero Cup
- Suzuki Swift Cup
- Iberian Rally Trophy
- N5 Cup
- 2RM Trophy

Round	Dates	Rally name	Surface	Notes
1	08-10 April	XXXVIII Rallye Sierra Morena	Tarmac	Clio Trophy Spain Rd.1, Dacia Sandero Cup Rd 1, Suzuki Swift Cup Rd 1, Iberian Rally Trophy Rd 1, Spain Tarmac Cup Rd 1, Andalucía Rd 3,
2	23-24 April	X Rallye Tierras Altas de Lorca	Gravel	Spain Gravel Cup Rd 1, Andalucía Gravel Rd 1, 2RM Trophy Rd 1,
4	15-16 May	Rallye Villa de Adeje	Tarmac	Iberian Rally Trophy Rd 2, Canary Islands Rd 2,
5	05-6 June	Rallye Terra da Auga	Gravel	Spain Gravel Cup Rd 2, N5 Cup Rd 2, 2RM Trophy Rd 2,
6	19-20 June	Rallye Reino de Leon	Gravel	Spain Gravel Cup Rd 3, N5 Cup Rd 3, 2RM Trophy Rd 3,
7	17-18 July	LIV Rallye de Ourense Termal	Tarmac	Clio Trophy Spain Rd.3, Dacia Sandero Cup Rd 3, Suzuki Swift Cup Rd 3,
8	21-22 August	LII Rallye de Ferrol Suzuki	Tarmac	Suzuki Swift Cup Rd 4, Tour European Rally Rd 3,
9	11-12 September	LVIII Rallye Princesa de Asturias	Tarmac	Clio Trophy Spain Rd.4, Dacia Sandero Cup Rd 4, Iberian Rally Trophy Rd 4, Spain Tarmac Cup Rd 6, N5 Cup Rd 5
10	02-3 October	XLIV Rallye Villa de Llanes	Tarmac	Suzuki Swift Cup Rd 6, Spain Tarmac Cup Rd 7,
11	23-24 October	VIII Rallye de Pozoblanco	Gravel	Andalucia Gravel Rd 3, Spain Gravel Cup Rd 6, N5 Cup Rd 6, 2RM Trophy Rd 6,
12	06-7 November	XVI Rallye La Nucia Trofeo Costa Blanca	Tarmac	Clio Trophy Spain Rd.5, Dacia Sandero Cup Rd 5, Iberian Rally Trophy Rd 5, Spain Tarmac Cup Rd 9
13	20-21 November	Rallye de Tierra de Madrid	Gravel	Spain Gravel Cup Rd 7, 2RM Trophy Rd 7,
14	04-5 December	Rallyeshow de Madrid	Tarmac	Clio Trophy Spain Rd.6, Suzuki Swift Cup Rd 8,

== Event results ==
Podium places and informations on each event

Round	Rally Name	Podium Finishers				Statistics			
Round	Rally Name	Rank	Driver	Car	Time	Stages	Length-KM	Starters	Finishers
1	(Andalusia) 38th Rally Sierra Morena	1	(Spain) Jose Antonio Suárez	Skoda Fabia Rally2 Evo	1:26:33.0	10 (1 cancelled)	151.52	36	27
1	(Andalusia) 38th Rally Sierra Morena	2	(Spain) Jan Solans	Citroen C3 R5	1:27:11.8	10 (1 cancelled)	151.52	36	27
1	(Andalusia) 38th Rally Sierra Morena	3	(Spain) Javier Pardo	Suzuki Swift R4lly S	1:29:27.2	10 (1 cancelled)	151.52	36	27

Round	Rally Name	Podium Finishers				Statistics			
Round	Rally Name	Rank	Driver	Car	Time	Stages	Length-KM	Starters	Finishers
2	(Region of Murcia) 10th Rally Tierras Altas de Lorca	1	(Spain) Jan Solans	Citroen C3 R5	45:48.5	6	101.44	26	19
2	(Region of Murcia) 10th Rally Tierras Altas de Lorca	2	(Spain) Jose Antonio Suárez	Skoda Fabia Rally2 Evo	46:18.7	6	101.44	26	19
2	(Region of Murcia) 10th Rally Tierras Altas de Lorca	3	(Spain) Gorka Eizmendi	Skoda Fabia R5	47:15.1	6	101.44	26	19

Round	Rally Name	Podium Finishers				Statistics			
Round	Rally Name	Rank	Driver	Car	Time	Stages	Length-KM	Starters	Finishers
3	(Canary Islands) 30th Rally Villa de Adeje	1	(Spain) Enrique Cruz	Ford Fiesta R5	1:29:10.5	14 (1 cancelled)	154.76	24	18
3	(Canary Islands) 30th Rally Villa de Adeje	2	(Spain) Yeray Lemes	Citroen C3 R5	1:29:41.9	14 (1 cancelled)	154.76	24	18
3	(Canary Islands) 30th Rally Villa de Adeje	3	(Spain) Surhayen Pernía	Hyundai I20 R5	1:29:46.4	14 (1 cancelled)	154.76	24	18

Round	Rally Name	Podium Finishers				Statistics			
Round	Rally Name	Rank	Driver	Car	Time	Stages	Length-KM	Starters	Finishers
4	(Galicia (Spain)) 8th Rally da Auga-Camiño de Santiago	1	(Spain) Jose Antonio Suárez	Skoda Fabia Rally2 Evo	1:22:21.8	9	122.78	42	21
4	(Galicia (Spain)) 8th Rally da Auga-Camiño de Santiago	2	(Spain) Iván Ares	Hyundai I20 R5	1:23:35.0	9	122.78	42	21
4	(Galicia (Spain)) 8th Rally da Auga-Camiño de Santiago	3	(Spain) Gorka Eizmendi	Skoda Fabia R5	1:25:21.1	9	122.78	42	21

Round	Rally Name	Podium Finishers				Statistics			
Round	Rally Name	Rank	Driver	Car	Time	Stages	Length-KM	Starters	Finishers
5	(Galicia (Spain)) 54th Rally de Ourense	1	(Spain) Jose Antonio Suárez	Skoda Fabia Rally2 Evo	1:25:28.8	10	150.12	69	46
5	(Galicia (Spain)) 54th Rally de Ourense	2	(Spain) Iván Ares	Hyundai I20 R5	1:26:17.8	10	150.12	69	46
5	(Galicia (Spain)) 54th Rally de Ourense	3	(Spain) Jose Luis Peláez	Volkswagen Polo GTI R5	1:29:29.1	10	150.12	69	46
