= 2015 Rally Argentina =

Motor racing event for rally cars

2015 Rally Argentina 35º XION Rally Argentina
Round 4 of 13 of the 2015 World Rally Championship
| ← Previous event | Next event → |
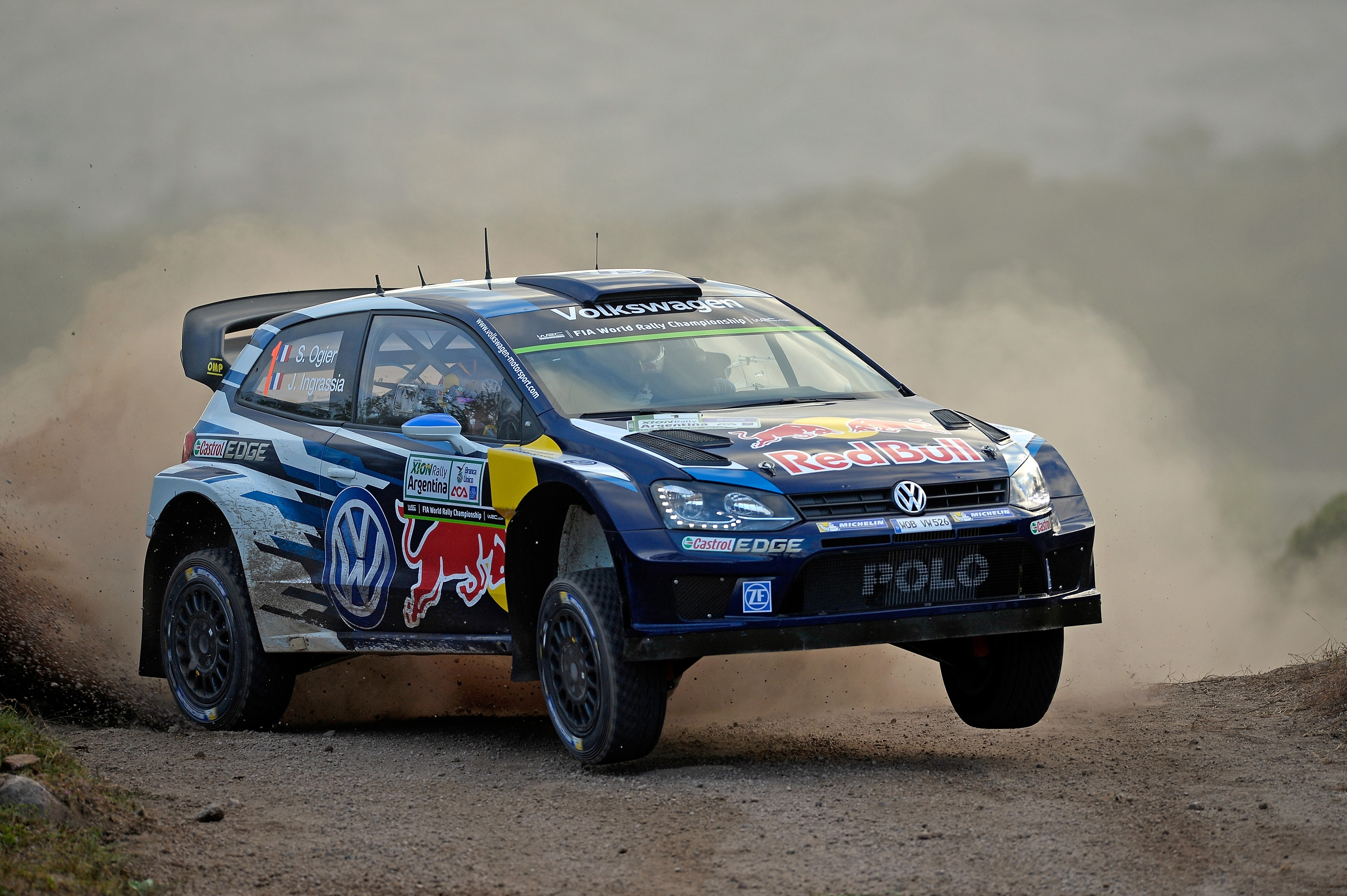
- Host country: Argentina
- Rally base: Villa Carlos Paz
- Dates run: 23 – 26 April 2015
- Stages: 12 (315.86 km; 196.27 miles)
- Stage surface: Gravel

Statistics
- Crews: 60 at start, 26 at finish

Overall results
- Overall winner: (United Kingdom) Kris Meeke (Republic of Ireland) Paul Nagle (France) Citroën Total Abu Dhabi WRT

The 2015 XION Rally Argentina was a motor racing event for rally cars that was held over four days between 23 and 26 April 2015. It marked the thirty-fifth running of the Rally Argentina, and was the fourth round of the 2015 World Rally Championship and WRC-2 seasons.

The rally was won by Kris Meeke who, alongside his co-driver Paul Nagle, became the first British rally driver to win a WRC rally since 2002.

== Entry list ==
Notable entrants
| No. | Entrant | Class | Driver | Co-driver | Car | Tyre |
|---|---|---|---|---|---|---|
| 1 | (Germany) Volkswagen Motorsport | WRC | (France) Sébastien Ogier | (France) Julien Ingrassia | Volkswagen Polo R WRC | MI |
| 2 | (Germany) Volkswagen Motorsport | WRC | (Finland) Jari-Matti Latvala | (Finland) Miikka Anttila | Volkswagen Polo R WRC | MI |
| 3 | (France) Citroën Total Abu Dhabi WRT | WRC | (United Kingdom) Kris Meeke | (Republic of Ireland) Paul Nagle | Citroën DS3 WRC | MI |
| 4 | (France) Citroën Total Abu Dhabi WRT | WRC | (Norway) Mads Østberg | (Sweden) Jonas Andersson | Citroën DS3 WRC | MI |
| 5 | (United Kingdom) M-Sport Ltd | WRC | (United Kingdom) Elfyn Evans | (United Kingdom) Daniel Barritt | Ford Fiesta RS WRC | MI |
| 6 | (United Kingdom) M-Sport Ltd | WRC | (Estonia) Ott Tänak | (Estonia) Raigo Mőlder | Ford Fiesta RS WRC | MI |
| 7 | (Germany) Hyundai Motorsport | WRC | (Belgium) Thierry Neuville | (Belgium) Nicolas Gilsoul | Hyundai i20 WRC | MI |
| 8 | (Germany) Hyundai Motorsport | WRC | (Spain) Dani Sordo | (Spain) Marc Martí | Hyundai i20 WRC | MI |
| 9 | (Germany) Volkswagen Motorsport II | WRC | (Norway) Andreas Mikkelsen | (Norway) Ola Fløene | Volkswagen Polo R WRC | MI |
| 12 | (France) Citroën Total Abu Dhabi WRT | WRC | (United Arab Emirates) Khalid Al Qassimi | (United Kingdom) Chris Patterson | Citroën DS3 WRC | MI |
| 20 | (Germany) Hyundai Motorsport N | WRC | (New Zealand) Hayden Paddon | (New Zealand) John Kennard | Hyundai i20 WRC | MI |
| 21 | (Czech Republic) Jipocar Czech National Team | WRC | (Czech Republic) Martin Prokop | (Czech Republic) Michal Ernst | Ford Fiesta RS WRC | P |
| 36 | Youth & Sports Qatar Rally Team | WRC-2 | (Qatar) Abdulaziz Al-Kuwari | (United Kingdom) Marshall Clarke | Ford Fiesta RRC | MI |
| 37 | (Italy) FWRT s.r.l. | WRC | (Italy) Lorenzo Bertelli | (Italy) Giovanni Bernacchini | Ford Fiesta RS WRC | P |
| 38 | (Ukraine) Yuriy Protasov | WRC-2 | (Ukraine) Yuriy Protasov | (Ukraine) Pavlo Cherepin | Ford Fiesta RRC | P |
| 40 | (United Kingdom) Drive Dmack | WRC-2 | (Finland) Jari Ketomaa | (Finland) Kaj Lindström | Ford Fiesta R5 | DM |
| 41 | (United Kingdom) Drive Dmack | WRC-2 | (Peru) Nicolás Fuchs | (Argentina) Fernando Mussano | Ford Fiesta R5 | DM |
| 43 | (Russia) TAIF Rally Team | WRC-2 | (Russia) Radik Shaymiev | (Russia) Maxim Tsvetkov | Ford Fiesta R5 | MI |
| 45 | (Italy) Gianluca Linari | WRC-2 | (Italy) Gianluca Linari | (Italy) Nicola Arena | Subaru Impreza STi N15 | P |
| 51 | (Romania) Napoca Rally Academy | WRC-2 | (Italy) Simone Tempestini | (Italy) Matteo Chiarcossi | Subaru Impreza STi N14 | P |
| 52 | (Paraguay) Diego Domínguez | WRC-2 | (Paraguay) Diego Domínguez | (Argentina) Edgardo Galindo | Ford Fiesta R5 | DM |
| 54 | (Paraguay) Didier Arias | WRC-2 | (Paraguay) Didier Arias | (Paraguay) Héctor Núñez | Ford Fiesta R5 | DM |

| Icon | Class |
|---|---|
| WRC | WRC entries eligible to score manufacturer points |
| WRC | WRC entries ineligible to score manufacturer points |
| WRC-2 | Registered to take part in WRC-2 championship |

== Results ==
=== Event standings ===
| Pos. | No. | Driver | Co-driver | Team | Car | Class | Time | Difference | Points |
Overall classification
| 1 | 3 | (United Kingdom) Kris Meeke | (Republic of Ireland) Paul Nagle | (France) Citroën Total Abu Dhabi WRT | Citroën DS3 WRC | WRC | 3:41:44.9 | 0.00 | 25 |
| 2 | 4 | (Norway) Mads Østberg | (Sweden) Jonas Andersson | (France) Citroën Total Abu Dhabi WRT | Citroën DS3 WRC | WRC | 3:42:03.0 | +18.1 | 19 |
| 3 | 5 | (United Kingdom) Elfyn Evans | (United Kingdom) Daniel Barritt | (United Kingdom) M-Sport World Rally Team | Ford Fiesta RS WRC | WRC | 3:45:12.3 | +3:27.4 | 15 |
| 4 | 21 | (Czech Republic) Martin Prokop | (Czech Republic) Jan Tománek | (Czech Republic) Jipocar Czech National Team | Ford Fiesta RS WRC | WRC | 3:48:11.0 | +6:26.1 | 12 |
| 5 | 8 | (Spain) Dani Sordo | (Spain) Marc Martí | (Germany) Hyundai Motorsport | Hyundai i20 WRC | WRC | 3:52:31.6 | +10:46.7 | 12 |
| 6 | 12 | (United Arab Emirates) Khalid Al Qassimi | (United Kingdom) Chris Patterson | (France) Citroën Total Abu Dhabi WRT | Citroën DS3 WRC | WRC | 3:53:04.8 | +11:19.9 | 8 |
| 7 | 36 | (Qatar) Abdulaziz Al-Kuwari | (United Kingdom) Marshall Clarke | Youth & Sports Qatar Rally Team | Ford Fiesta RRC | WRC-2 | 3:57:47.5 | +16:02.6 | 6 |
| 8 | 52 | (Paraguay) Diego Domínguez | (Argentina) Edgardo Galindo | (Paraguay) Diego Domínguez | Ford Fiesta R5 | WRC-2 | 4:00:33.1 | +18:48.2 | 4 |
| 9 | 57 | (Paraguay) Gustavo Saba | (Argentina) Diego Cagnotti | (Paraguay) Saba Competition | Škoda Fabia S2000 | WRC-2 | 4:03:05.5 | +21:20.6 | 2 |
| 10 | 72 | (Argentina) Federico Villagra | (Argentina) Diego Curletto | (Argentina) Federico Villagra | Ford Fiesta MR | | 4:07:04.5 | +25:19.6 | |
| 11 | 6 | (Estonia) Ott Tänak | (Estonia) Raigo Mõlder | (United Kingdom) M-Sport World Rally Team | Ford Fiesta RS WRC | WRC | 4:07:37.2 | +25:41.9 | 1 |
| 17 | 1 | (France) Sébastien Ogier | (France) Julien Ingrassia | (Germany) Volkswagen Motorsport | Volkswagen Polo R WRC | WRC | 4:18:56.4 | +37:11.5 | 3 |
WRC-2 standings
| 1 (7.) | 36 | (Qatar) Abdulaziz Al-Kuwari | (United Kingdom) Marshall Clarke | Youth & Sports Qatar Rally Team | Ford Fiesta RRC | WRC-2 | 3:57:47.5 | 0.0 | 25 |
| 2 (8.) | 52 | (Paraguay) Diego Domínguez | (Argentina) Edgardo Galindo | (Paraguay) Diego Domínguez | Ford Fiesta R5 | WRC-2 | 4:00:33.1 | +2:45.6 | 18 |
| 3 (12.) | 40 | (Finland) Jari Ketomaa | (Finland) Kaj Lindström | (United Kingdom) Drive Dmack | Ford Fiesta R5 | WRC-2 | 4:09:50.7 | +12:03.2 | 15 |
| 4 (13.) | 38 | (Ukraine) Yuriy Protasov | (Ukraine) Pavlo Cherepin | (Ukraine) Yuriy Protasov | Ford Fiesta RRC | WRC-2 | 4:11:10.3 | +13:22.8 | 12 |
| 5 (14.) | 54 | (Paraguay) Didier Arias | (Paraguay) Héctor Núñez | (Paraguay) Didier Arias | Ford Fiesta R5 | WRC-2 | 4:14:36.3 | +16:48.8 | 10 |
| 6 (19.) | 51 | (Italy) Simone Tempestini | (Italy) Matteo Chiarcossi | (Romania) Napoca Rally Academy | Subaru Impreza STi N14 | WRC-2 | 4:25:27.9 | +27:40.4 | 8 |
| 7 (22.) | 45 | (Italy) Gianluca Linari | (Italy) Nicola Arena | (Italy) Gianluca Linari | Subaru Impreza STi N5 | WRC-2 | 4:36:04.9 | +38:17.4 | 6 |

=== Special stages ===
| Day | Stage number | Stage name | Length | Stage winner | Co-driver | Car No. | Car | Time | Rally Leader |
|---|---|---|---|---|---|---|---|---|---|
| 23 Apr | SS1 | (Argentina) San Luis | 2.68 km | (France) Sébastien Ogier | (France) Julien Ingrassia | 1 | Volkswagen Polo R WRC | 2:32.0 | (France) Sébastien Ogier |
| 24 Apr | SS2 | (Argentina) Ascochinga 1 | 51.99 km | (United Kingdom) Kris Meeke | (Republic of Ireland) Paul Nagle | 3 | Citroën DS3 WRC | 38:26.2 | (United Kingdom) Kris Meeke |
| 24 Apr | SS3 | (Argentina) Tanti 1 | 19.71 km | (Finland) Jari-Matti Latvala | (Finland) Miikka Anttila | 2 | Volkswagen Polo R WRC | 10:10.0 | (United Kingdom) Kris Meeke |
| 24 Apr | SS4 | (Argentina) Ascochinga 2 | 51.99 km | (United Kingdom) Kris Meeke | (Republic of Ireland) Paul Nagle | 3 | Citroën DS3 WRC | 38:12.5 | (United Kingdom) Kris Meeke |
| 24 Apr | SS5 | (Argentina) Tanti 2 | 19.71 km | (United Kingdom) Kris Meeke | (Republic of Ireland) Paul Nagle | 3 | Citroën DS3 WRC | 10:03.9 | (United Kingdom) Kris Meeke |
| 24 Apr | SS6 | (Argentina) Fernet Branca | 6.04 km | (Spain) Dani Sordo | (Spain) Marc Martí | 8 | Hyundai i20 WRC | 5:01.0 | (United Kingdom) Kris Meeke |
| 25 Apr | SS7 | (Argentina) San Marcos 1 | 23.05 km | (France) Sébastien Ogier | (France) Julien Ingrassia | 1 | Volkswagen Polo R WRC | 17:31.1 | (United Kingdom) Kris Meeke |
| 25 Apr | SS8 | (Argentina) Characato 1 | 42.50 km | (Norway) Andreas Mikkelsen | (Norway) Ola Fløene | 9 | Volkswagen Polo R WRC | 27:17.4 | (United Kingdom) Kris Meeke |
| 25 Apr | SS9 | (Argentina) San Marcos 2 | 23.05 km | (Norway) Andreas Mikkelsen | (Norway) Ola Fløene | 9 | Volkswagen Polo R WRC | 17:13.5 | (United Kingdom) Kris Meeke |
| 25 Apr | SS10 | (Argentina) Characato 2 | 42.50 km | (Norway) Andreas Mikkelsen | (Norway) Ola Fløene | 9 | Volkswagen Polo R WRC | 27:00.3 | (United Kingdom) Kris Meeke |
| 26 Apr | SS11 | (Argentina) Copina 1 | 16.32 km | (Norway) Andreas Mikkelsen | (Norway) Ola Fløene | 9 | Volkswagen Polo R WRC | 13:09.8 | (United Kingdom) Kris Meeke |
| 26 Apr | SS12 | (Argentina) Copina 2 (Power Stage) | 16.32 km | (France) Sébastien Ogier | (France) Julien Ingrassia | 1 | Volkswagen Polo R WRC | 12:59.6 | (United Kingdom) Kris Meeke |

== Championship standings after the event ==
=== WRC ===
Drivers' Championship standings

| Pos. | Driver | Points |
|---|---|---|
| 1 | (France) Sébastien Ogier | 84 |
| 2 | (Norway) Mads Østberg | 51 |
| 3 | (Norway) Andreas Mikkelsen | 47 |
| 4 | (United Kingdom) Elfyn Evans | 41 |
| 5 | (United Kingdom) Kris Meeke | 35 |

Manufacturers' Championship standings

| Pos. | Constructor | Points |
|---|---|---|
| 1 | (Germany) Volkswagen Motorsport | 103 |
| 2 | (France) Citroën Total Abu Dhabi WRT | 85 |
| 3 | (Germany) Hyundai Motorsport | 85 |
| 4 | (United Kingdom) M-Sport World Rally Team | 71 |
| 5 | (Czech Republic) Jipocar Czech National Team | 32 |

=== Other ===
WRC2 Drivers' Championship standings

| Pos. | Driver | Points |
|---|---|---|
| 1 | (Finland) Jari Ketomaa | 55 |
| 2 | (Qatar) Abdulaziz Al-Kuwari | 37 |
| 3 | (France) Stéphane Lefebvre | 25 |
| 4 | (Qatar) Nasser Al-Attiyah | 25 |
| 5 | (Ukraine) Yuriy Protasov | 22 |

WRC3 Drivers' Championship standings

| Pos. | Driver | Points |
|---|---|---|
| 1 | (Norway) Ole Christian Veiby | 40 |
| 2 | (France) Quentin Gilbert | 25 |
| 3 | (Germany) Christian Riedemann | 18 |
| 4 | (Italy) Simone Tempestini | 12 |
| 5 | (France) Stéphane Consani | 10 |

JWRC Drivers' Championship standings

| Pos. | Driver | Points |
|---|---|---|
| 1 | (France) Quentin Gilbert | 25 |
| 2 | (Germany) Christian Riedemann | 18 |
| 3 | (Norway) Ole Christian Veiby | 15 |
| 4 | (Italy) Simone Tempestini | 12 |
| 5 | (France) Yohan Rossel | 10 |
