= 2017 Asia-Pacific Rally Championship =

The 2017 Asia-Pacific Rally Championship season was an international rally championship sanctioned by the FIA. The championship was contested by a combination of regulations with Group R competing directly against Super 2000 cars for points.

The championship began in New Zealand on 28 April and concluded in India on 26 November. It was held over five rallies. A sixth rally, the third round, Zhangye Rally scheduled to be held in China was cancelled.

The championship was won for the third time by the reigning champion, Indian driver Gaurav Gill driving a Škoda Fabia R5. Gill had previously won the championship in 2013 and 2016. Gill was first or second in each of the five rallies, winning his home rally the Coffee Day Rally as well as rallies in New Zealand and Japan. His Team MRF team mate, Norwegian rallyist Ole Christian Veiby was runner up in the championship, taking the remain two victories in Australia and Malaysia. Swedish driver Robert Blomberg was third in the title driving a Mitsubishi Mirage R5. Blomberg finished ahead of Veiby in Japan, the only APRC driver to beat either Team MRF Škoda driver. Veiby won the Pacific Cup held over just the two Pacific division rallies after New Caledonia was dropped from the schedule two years ago. Gill won the Asian cup held over the three events held in the Asian division.

== Event calendar and results ==
The 2017 APRC is as follows:

Round	Rally name	Podium finishers				Statistics			
Round	Rally name	Rank	Driver	Car	Time	Stages	Length	Starters	Finishers
1	(New Zealand) International Rally of Whangarei (28–30 April)	1	(India) Gaurav Gill	Škoda Fabia R5	2:35:06.8	15	248.77 km	61	27
1	(New Zealand) International Rally of Whangarei (28–30 April)	2	(Norway) Ole Christian Veiby	Škoda Fabia R5	2:37:09.6	15	248.77 km	61	27
1	(New Zealand) International Rally of Whangarei (28–30 April)	3	(New Zealand) Matt Summerfield	Subaru Impreza WRX STi	2:42:00.3	15	248.77 km	61	27
2	(Australia) National Capital Rally (26–28 May)	1	(Norway) Ole Christian Veiby	Škoda Fabia R5	2:15:11.2	13	212.67 km	14	12
2	(Australia) National Capital Rally (26–28 May)	2	(India) Gaurav Gill	Škoda Fabia R5	2:16:00.5	13	212.67 km	14	12
2	(Australia) National Capital Rally (26–28 May)	3	(Finland) Jari Ketomaa	Mitsubishi Mirage R5	2:17:16.8	13	212.67 km	14	12
3	(Malaysia) International Rally of Johor (11–13 August)	1	(Norway) Ole Christian Veiby	Škoda Fabia R5	3:02:39.1	13	216.66 km	29	27
3	(Malaysia) International Rally of Johor (11–13 August)	2	(India) Gaurav Gill	Škoda Fabia R5	3:07:20.4	13	216.66 km	29	27
3	(Malaysia) International Rally of Johor (11–13 August)	3	(Finland) Jari Ketomaa	Mitsubishi Mirage R5	3:07:39.5	13	216.66 km	29	27
4	(Japan) Rally Hokkaido (15–17 September)	1	(India) Gaurav Gill	Škoda Fabia R5	1:53:21.8	17	193.24 km	64	48
4	(Japan) Rally Hokkaido (15–17 September)	2	(Japan) Toshihiro Arai	Subaru WRX Sti	1:55:46.7	17	193.24 km	64	48
4	(Japan) Rally Hokkaido (15–17 September)	3	(Japan) Norihiko Katsuta	Subaru WRX Sti	1:57:43.2	17	193.24 km	64	48
5	Coffee Day India Rally (21-26 November)	1	(India) Gaurav Gill	Škoda Fabia R5	3:20:19.8	17	207.54 km		
5	Coffee Day India Rally (21-26 November)	2	(Norway) Ole Christian Veiby	Škoda Fabia R5	3:37:58.2	17	207.54 km		
5	Coffee Day India Rally (21-26 November)	3	(India) Abhilash Pallath Ganesh	Subaru Impreza STi N14	3:42:36.4	17	207.54 km		

== Championship standings ==
The 2017 APRC for Drivers points was as follows:

Pos.	Driver	Vehicle	(New Zealand) NZL	(Australia) AUS	(Malaysia) MAL	(Japan) JPN	(India) IND	Total
1	(India) Gaurav Gill	Škoda Fabia R5	1 ^{13}	2 ^{12}	2 ^{12}	1 ^{13}	1 ^{13}	174
2	(Norway) Ole Christian Veiby	Škoda Fabia R5	2 ^{13}	1 ^{14}	1 ^{13}	3 ^{7}	2 ^{12}	160
3	(Sweden) Robert Blomberg	Mitsubishi Mirage R5	3 ^{9}	4 ^{8}	4 ^{7}	2 ^{11}		92
4	(Finland) Jari Ketomaa	Mitsubishi Mirage R5	Ret ^{5}	3 ^{10}	3 ^{11}	Ret		56
5	(India) Abhilash Pallath Ganesh	Subaru Impreza STi N14	4 ^{7}	5 ^{6}	Ret ^{4}		Ret ^{6}	45

Key
Colour	Result
Gold	Winner
Silver	2nd place
Bronze	3rd place
Green	Points finish
Blue	Non-points finish
Blue	Non-classified finish (NC)
Purple	Did not finish (Ret)
Black	Excluded (EX)
Black	Disqualified (DSQ)
White	Did not start (DNS)
White	Cancelled (C)
Blank	Withdrew entry from the event (WD)

Note: ^{1} – ^{14} refers to the bonus points awarded for each leg of the rally for the first five place getters, 1st (7), 2nd (5), 3rd (3), 4th (2), 5th (1). There were two bonus legs for each rally.

=== Pacific Cup ===
Pos.	Driver	Vehicle	(New Zealand) NZL	(Australia) AUS	Total
1	(Norway) Ole Christian Veiby	Škoda Fabia R5	1 ^{14}	1 ^{14}	78
2	(Japan) Fuyuhiko Takahashi	Subaru Impreza WRX STi	2 ^{11}	4 ^{8}	49
3	(India) Abhilash Pallath Ganesh	Subaru Impreza STi N14	3 ^{9}	3 ^{10}	49
4	(Finland) Jari Ketomaa	Mitsubishi Mirage R5	Ret ^{6}	2 ^{12}	36

=== Asia Cup ===
Pos.	Driver	Vehicle	(Malaysia) MAL	(Japan) JPN	(India) IND	Total
1	(India) Gaurav Gill	Škoda Fabia R5	1 ^{14}	1 ^{14}	1 ^{14}	117
2	(Sweden) Robert Blomberg	Mitsubishi Mirage R5	5 ^{7}	2 ^{11}		46
3	(India) Sanjay Takale	Mitsubishi Mirage R5	4 ^{7}	3 ^{5}		39
4	(Japan) Yuya Sumiyama	Škoda Fabia R5	3 ^{10}	Ret ^{6}		31
5	(New Zealand) Michael Young	Subaru Impreza STi N16	2 ^{12}	Ret		30
