= Miguel Lozano =

Professional Spanish freediver

Personal information
- Born: 1979 (age 45–46); Montgat, Spain

Sport
- Sport: Diving

Miguel Lozano is a professional freediver and freediving entrepreneur from Barcelona, Spain. He won silver medals twice in two of the three depth disciplines (Constant No Fins and Free Immersion) in the AIDA World Depth Championships in Cyprus in 2015. Lozano was the first Spaniard to reach a depth of 100m in Constant Weight (CWT) and 83m in Constant No Fins (CNF).

== Biography ==
Miguel Lozano was born in 1979 in Montgat, Barcelona, in a small fishing village on the shores of the Mediterranean Sea. In 2011, Lozano made the 'magic' depth of 100m in constant weight. A year later, he descends to 117m while competing in Free Immersion in the Bahamas.

In 2015, Lozano won silver medals twice in two of the three depth disciplines in the AIDA World Depth Championships in Cyprus. In 2016, he performed a 122-meter (400 feet) free immersion dive (FIM) at the Caribbean Cup Competition in Roatán, Honduras.

In 2022, Lozano attempted to break the world record for the deepest dive with the target depth of 125 meters, but he blacked out due to low oxygen pressure.

Currently, Lozano runs four freediving schools in the world: Apnea Canarias in Tenerife and Lanzarote, Dahab Freedivers in Egypt, and Freedive Air in Indonesia.
