= Škoda Fabia R5 =

Škoda R5 rally car

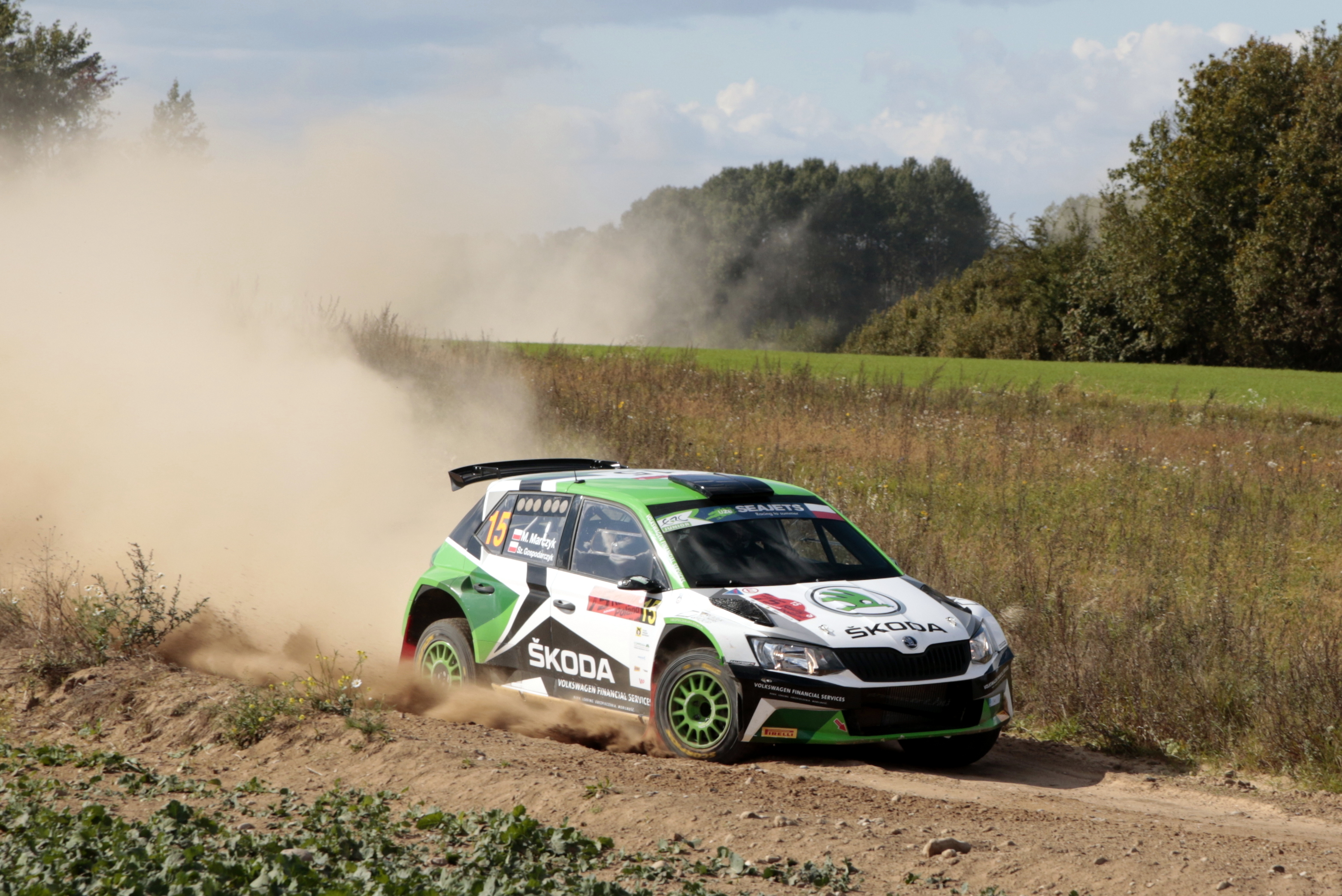
- A Factory backed Škoda Fabia R5 at the 2018 Rally Poland
- Category: R5
- Constructor: Škoda Motorsport
- Designers: Aleš Rada (Technical Director, Škoda Motorsport)
- Homologation: 1 April 2015
- Predecessor: Škoda Fabia S2000
- Successor: Škoda Fabia R5/Rally2 evo

Technical specifications
- Length: 3,994 mm
- Width: 1,820 mm
- Engine: VW EA888 1.6 L (98 cu in) 4-cylinder, 16-valve turbocharged
- Weight: 1,230 kg
- Tyres: Michelin

Competition history
- Notable entrants: (Czech Republic) Škoda Motorsport
- Debut: World Rally Championship-2: (Monaco) 2015 Monte Carlo Rally; European Rally Championship: (Belgium) 2015 Ypres Rally; Asia-Pacific Rally Championship: (China) 2015 Rally China; Codasur South American Rally Championship: (Paraguay) 2016 Rally Trans Itapua
- First win: World Rally Championship-2: (Poland) 2015 Rally Poland; European Rally Championship: (Belgium) 2015 Ypres Rally; Asia-Pacific Rally Championship: (China) 2015 Rally China; Codasur South American Rally Championship: (Paraguay) 2016 Rally Trans Itapua
- Teams' Championships: 2015, 2016, 2017, 2018 World Rally Championship-2 for Teams; 2019 World Rally Championship-2 Pro for Manufacturers
- Drivers' Championships: 2019 World Rally Championship-2 Pro for Drivers; 2016, 2017, 2018 World Rally Championship-2 for Drivers; 2016, 2017, 2018 Asia-Pacific Rally Championship for Drivers; 2016, 2017, 2018 Codasur South American Rally Championship; 2019 European Rally Championship

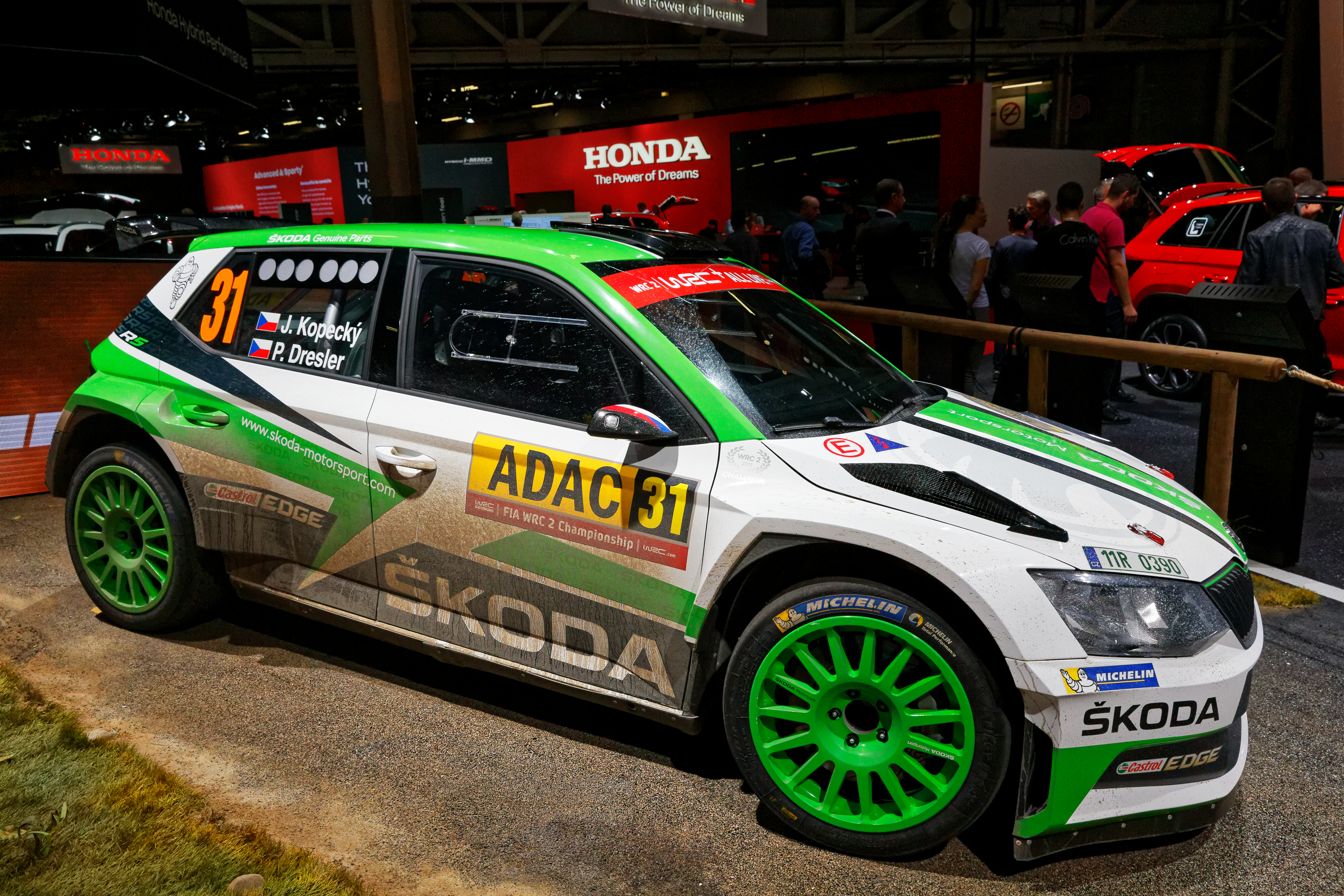
A Fabia R5 in the colours of Škoda's factory team on display at the 2018 Paris Motor Show.

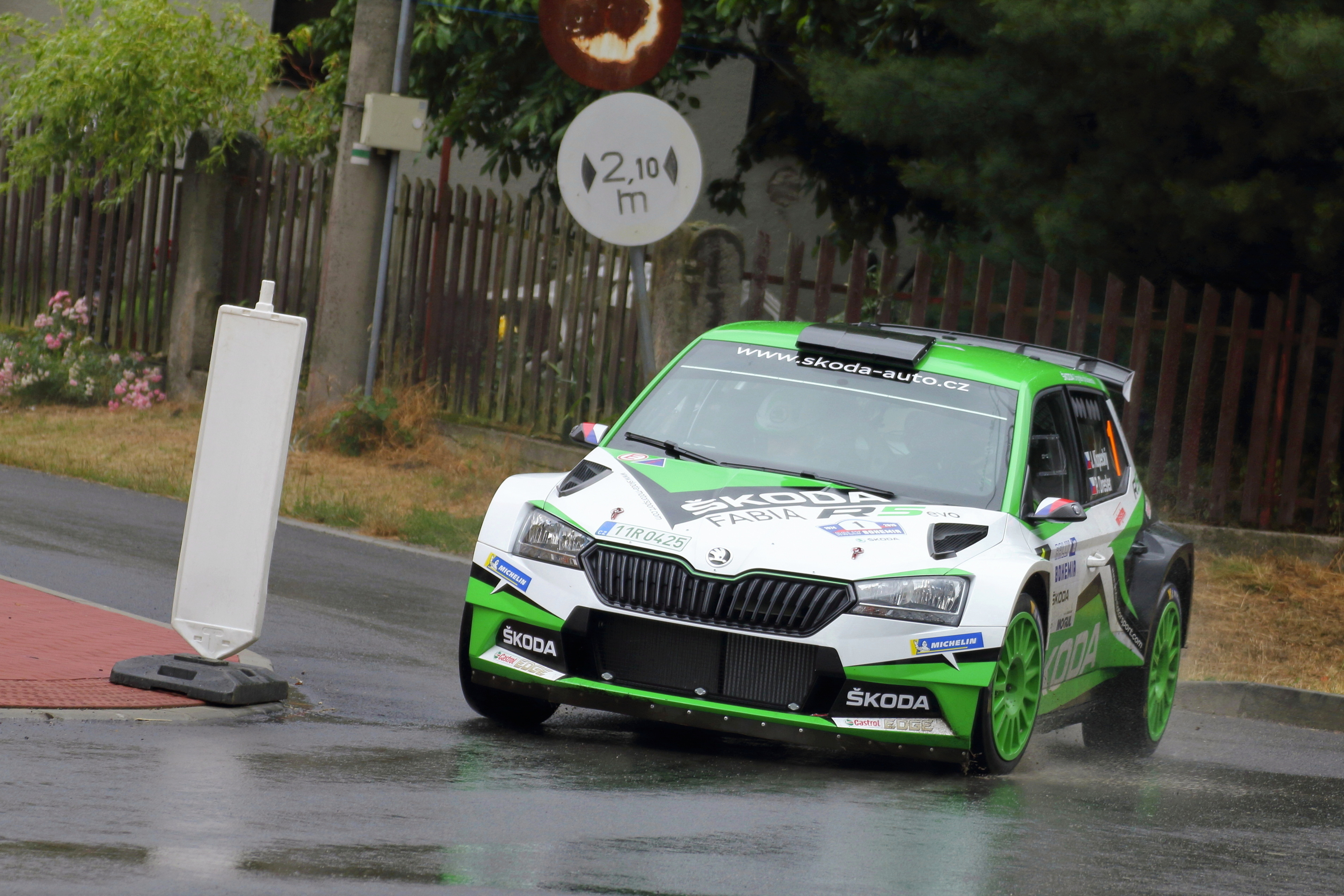
Fabia R5 Evo of Jan Kopecký in 2019

The Škoda Fabia R5 is a rally car built by Škoda Motorsport. It is based upon the Škoda Fabia road car and is built to R5 regulations. It made its competition début in 2015 as a successor to the Škoda Fabia S2000. The car proved to be very successful in the World Rally Championship-2 class, winning thirty-five events between 2015 and 2018. Esapekka Lappi won the 2016 World Rally Championship-2 drivers title with four victories, Pontus Tidemand won the 2017 championship and Jan Kopecký won the 2018 championship. Škoda Motorsport won the FIA World Rally Championship-2 for Teams in 2015, 2016 and 2017. Starting in 2019, Škoda Motorsport entered the Fabia R5 in the professional class of the World Rally Championship-2. An updated version of the Fabia R5 known as the Škoda Fabia R5 Evo was introduced during the 2019 season. The car was originally launched with the R5 group nomenclature, but in early 2020, Škoda Motorsport announced the update of their car names according to the new FIA pyramid, renaming successor, the Fabia R5 evo as the Fabia Rally2 evo.

The Fabia R5 has also competed in regional rally championships in Europe the Asia-Pacific and Codasur South American Rally Championships. Gaurav Gill won the 2016 and 2017 Asia-Pacific titles and Yuya Sumiyama won the 2018 championship. Gustavo Saba won the 2016, 2017 and 2018 Codasur South American Rally Championships. The car has also won a further fourteen rounds of the European Rally Championship.

From a commercial and competitive standpoint, the Fabia is one of the most successful cars in the history of the R5 category, winning over 700 rally competitions all around the world, and selling over 240 units to independent teams and owners over a three-and-a-half-year period.

== Results ==
=== World Championships ===
==== World Rally Championship-2 victories ====
Year	No.	Event	Driver	Co-driver
2015	1	2015 Rally Poland	(Finland) Esapekka Lappi	(Finland) Janne Ferm
2015	2	2015 Rally Finland	(Finland) Esapekka Lappi	(Finland) Janne Ferm
2015	3	(Germany) 2015 Rallye Deutschland	(Czech Republic) Jan Kopecký	(Czech Republic) Pavel Dresler
2015	4	(Spain) 2015 Rally Catalunya	(Sweden) Pontus Tidemand	(Sweden) Emil Axelsson
2016	5	(Mexico) 2016 Rally México	(Finland) Teemu Suninen	(Finland) Mikko Markkula
2016	6	2016 Rally Argentina	(Peru) Nicolás Fuchs	(Argentina) Fernando Mussano
2016	7	2016 Rally de Portugal	(Sweden) Pontus Tidemand	(Sweden) Jonas Andersson
2016	8	(Italy) 2016 Rally Italia Sardegna	(Finland) Teemu Suninen	(Finland) Mikko Markkula
2016	9	2016 Rally Poland	(Finland) Teemu Suninen	(Finland) Mikko Markkula
2016	10	2016 Rally Finland	(Finland) Esapekka Lappi	(Finland) Janne Ferm
2016	11	(Germany) 2016 Rallye Deutschland	(Finland) Esapekka Lappi	(Finland) Janne Ferm
2016	12	(Spain) 2016 Rally Catalunya	(Czech Republic) Jan Kopecký	(Czech Republic) Pavel Dresler
2016	13	(United Kingdom) 2016 Wales Rally GB	(Finland) Esapekka Lappi	(Finland) Janne Ferm
2016	14	2016 Rally Australia	(Finland) Esapekka Lappi	(Finland) Janne Ferm
2017	15	(Monaco) 2017 Monte Carlo Rally	(Norway) Andreas Mikkelsen	(Norway) Anders Jæger
2017	16	2017 Rally Sweden	(Sweden) Pontus Tidemand	(Sweden) Jonas Andersson
2017	17	2017 Rally Mexico	(Sweden) Pontus Tidemand	(Sweden) Jonas Andersson
2017	18	(France) 2017 Tour de Corse	(Norway) Andreas Mikkelsen	(Norway) Anders Jæger
2017	19	2017 Rally Argentina	(Sweden) Pontus Tidemand	(Sweden) Jonas Andersson
2017	20	2017 Rally de Portugal	(Sweden) Pontus Tidemand	(Sweden) Jonas Andersson
2017	21	(Italy) 2017 Rally Italia Sardegna	(Czech Republic) Jan Kopecký	(Czech Republic) Pavel Dresler
2017	22	2017 Rally Poland	(Norway) Ole Christian Veiby	(Norway) Stig Rune Skjærmoen
2017	23	2017 Rally Finland	(Finland) Jari Huttunen	(Finland) Antti Linnaketo
2017	24	(United Kingdom) 2017 Wales Rally GB	(Sweden) Pontus Tidemand	(Sweden) Jonas Andersson
2018	25	(Monaco) 2018 Monte Carlo Rally	(Czech Republic) Jan Kopecký	(Czech Republic) Pavel Dresler
2018	26	2018 Rally Mexico	(Sweden) Pontus Tidemand	(Sweden) Jonas Andersson
2018	27	(France) 2018 Tour de Corse	(Czech Republic) Jan Kopecký	(Czech Republic) Pavel Dresler
2018	28	2018 Rally Argentina	(Sweden) Pontus Tidemand	(Sweden) Jonas Andersson
2018	29	2018 Rally de Portugal	(Sweden) Pontus Tidemand	(Sweden) Jonas Andersson
2018	30	(Italy) 2018 Rally Italia Sardegna	(Czech Republic) Jan Kopecký	(Czech Republic) Pavel Dresler
2018	31	2018 Rally Finland	(Finland) Eerik Pietarinen	(Finland) Juhana Raitanen
2018	32	(Germany) 2018 Rallye Deutschland	(Czech Republic) Jan Kopecký	(Czech Republic) Pavel Dresler
2018	33	2018 Rally Turkey	(Czech Republic) Jan Kopecký	(Czech Republic) Pavel Dresler
2018	34	(United Kingdom) 2018 Wales Rally GB	(Finland) Kalle Rovanperä	(Finland) Jonne Halttunen
2018	35	(Spain) 2018 Rally Catalunya	(Finland) Kalle Rovanperä	(Finland) Jonne Halttunen
2019	36	2019 Rally Mexico	(Mexico) Benito Guerra Jr.	(Mexico) Jaime Zapata Ortega
2019	37	(France) 2019 Tour de Corse	(Italy) Fabio Andolfi	(Italy) Simone Scattolin

=== Regional championships ===
==== European Rally Championship victories ====
Year	No.	Event	Driver	Co-driver
2015	1	(Belgium) 2015 Ypres Rally	(Belgium) Freddy Loix	(Netherlands) Johan Gitsels
2015	2	(Czech Republic) 2015 Barum Rally Zlín	(Czech Republic) Jan Kopecký	(Czech Republic) Pavel Dresler
2016	3	(Greece) 2016 Acropolis Rally	(Latvia) Ralfs Sirmacis	(Latvia) Arturs Šimins
2016	4	(Belgium) 2016 Ypres Rally	(Belgium) Freddy Loix	(Netherlands) Johan Gitsels
2016	5	2016 Rally Estonia	(Latvia) Ralfs Sirmacis	(Latvia) Māris Kulšs
2016	6	(Czech Republic) 2016 Barum Rally Zlín	(Czech Republic) Jan Kopecký	(Czech Republic) Pavel Dresler
2016	7	(Latvia) 2016 Rally Liepāja	(Latvia) Ralfs Sirmacis	(Latvia) Māris Kulšs
2017	8	(Portugal) 2017 Rallye Azores	(Portugal) Bruno Magalhães	(Portugal) Hugo Magalhães
2017	9	(Czech Republic) 2017 Barum Rally Zlín	(Czech Republic) Jan Kopecký	(Czech Republic) Pavel Dresler
2017	10	(Latvia) 2017 Rally Liepāja	(Russia) Nikolay Gryazin	(Russia) Yaroslav Fedorov
2018	11	(Greece) 2018 Acropolis Rally	(Portugal) Bruno Magalhães	(Portugal) Hugo Magalhães
2018	12	2018 Rally Cyprus	(Cyprus) Simos Galatariotis	(Cyprus) Antonis Ioannou
2018	13	(Czech Republic) 2018 Barum Rally Zlín	(Czech Republic) Jan Kopecký	(Czech Republic) Pavel Dresler
2018	14	2018 Rally Poland	(Russia) Nikolay Gryazin	(Russia) Yaroslav Fedorov
2018	15	(Latvia) 2018 Rally Liepāja	(Russia) Nikolay Gryazin	(Russia) Yaroslav Fedorov
2019	16	(Portugal) 2019 Rallye Azores	(Poland) Łukasz Habaj	(Poland) Daniel Dymurski
2019	17	(Italy) 2019 Rally di Roma Capitale	(Italy) Giandomenico Basso	(Italy) Lorenzo Granai
2019	18	(Czech Republic) 2019 Barum Rally Zlín	(Czech Republic) Jan Kopecký	(Czech Republic) Pavel Dresler
2019	19	2019 Rally Hungary	(Hungary) Frigyes Turán	(Hungary) László Bagaméri

==== Asia-Pacific Rally Championship victories ====
Year	No.	Event	Driver	Co-driver
2015	1	2015 Rally China	(Sweden) Pontus Tidemand	(Sweden) Emil Axelsson
2016	2	(New Zealand) 2016 International Rally of Whangarei	(India) Gaurav Gill	(Australia) Glenn MacNeall
2016	3	(Australia) 2016 International Rally of Queensland	(India) Gaurav Gill	(Australia) Glenn MacNeall
2016	4	(Japan) 2016 Rally Hokkaido	(India) Gaurav Gill	(Australia) Glenn MacNeall
2016	5	(Malaysia) 2016 Malaysian Rally	(India) Gaurav Gill	(Australia) Glenn MacNeall
2016	6	2016 Rally of India	(India) Gaurav Gill	(Australia) Glenn MacNeall
2017	7	(New Zealand) 2017 International Rally of Whangarei	(India) Gaurav Gill	(Australia) Glenn MacNeall
2017	8	(Australia) 2017 National Capital Rally	(Norway) Ole Christian Veiby	(Norway) Stig Rune Skjærmoen
2017	9	(Malaysia) 2017 Malaysian Rally	(Norway) Ole Christian Veiby	(Norway) Stig Rune Skjærmoen
2017	10	(Japan) 2017 Rally Hokkaido	(India) Gaurav Gill	(Australia) Glenn MacNeall
2017	11	2017 Rally of India	(India) Gaurav Gill	(Australia) Glenn MacNeall
2018	12	(Australia) 2018 National Capital Rally	(Australia) Eli Evans	(Australia) Ben Searcy
2018	13	(Malaysia) 2018 Malaysian Rally	(Japan) Yuya Sumiyama	(Japan) Takahiro Yasui
2018	14	(Japan) 2018 Rally Hokkaido	(Japan) Yuya Sumiyama	(Japan) Takahiro Yasui

== See also ==
- Group R
  - Citroën C3 R5
  - Ford Fiesta R5
  - Hyundai i20 R5
  - Volkswagen Polo GTI R5
