= Enrique Pereira =

Uruguayan water polo player

Personal information
- Born: 1 December 1909; Montevideo, Uruguay
- Died: 10 March 1983 (aged 73); Montevideo, Uruguay

Sport
- Sport: Water polo

Enrique Pereira (1 December 1909 – 10 March 1983) was a Uruguayan water polo player. He competed at the 1936 Summer Olympics and the 1948 Summer Olympics.
