= Chevrolet Agile =

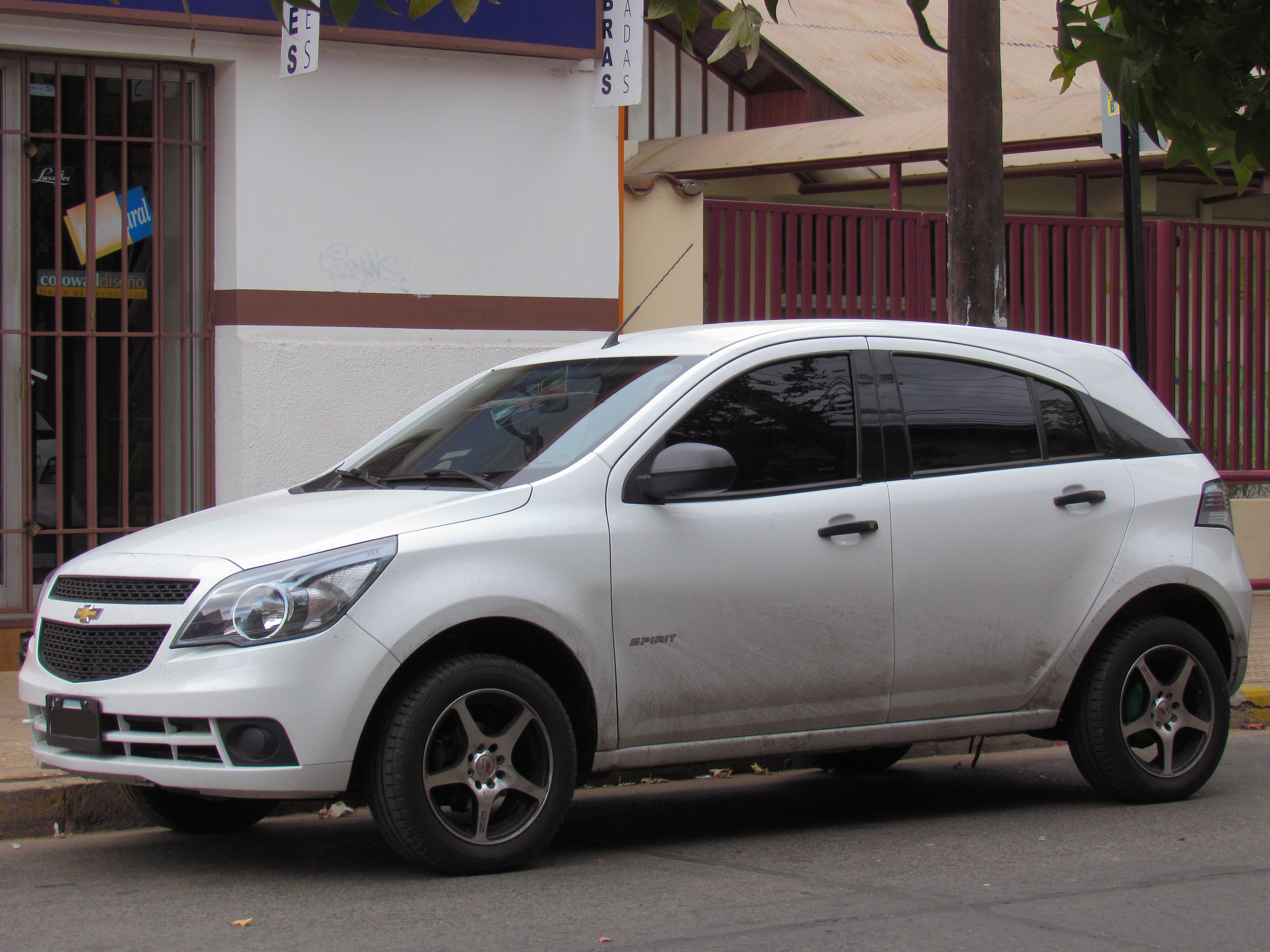

Overview
- Manufacturer: General Motors
- Production: 2009 – 2016
- Assembly: Argentina: Alvear, Santa Fe (GM Argentina)

Body and chassis
- Class: Subcompact
- Body style: 5-door hatchback 2-door pickup (Montana)
- Related: Chevrolet Celta; Chevrolet Corsa; Chevrolet Montana

Powertrain
- Engine: 1.4 L N14YF I4 (gasoline / ethanol)
- Transmission: 5-speed manual

Dimensions
- Wheelbase: 2,540 mm (100.0 in)
- Length: 4,000 mm (157.5 in)
- Width: 1,680 mm (66.1 in)
- Height: 1,470 mm (57.9 in)
- Curb weight: 1,032 kg (2,275 lb)

Chronology
- Predecessor: Chevrolet Corsa
- Successor: Chevrolet Onix

The Chevrolet Agile is a subcompact car that was developed by Chevrolet in Brazil and built in Argentina between 2009 and 2016. It was only produced as a 5-door hatchback, but a coupé utility sold as Chevrolet Montana was offered too.

== Overview ==
Based on the GPiX Concept which was introduced at the 2008 São Paulo Auto Show, the Agile went on sale in 2009 and competes with the Volkswagen Fox and similar models.

Based on the early '90s Opel Corsa B, the Agile was produced only as a 5-door hatchback; unlike the similar designed Chevrolet Celta, which was offered with 3-door and 4-door sedan configurations.

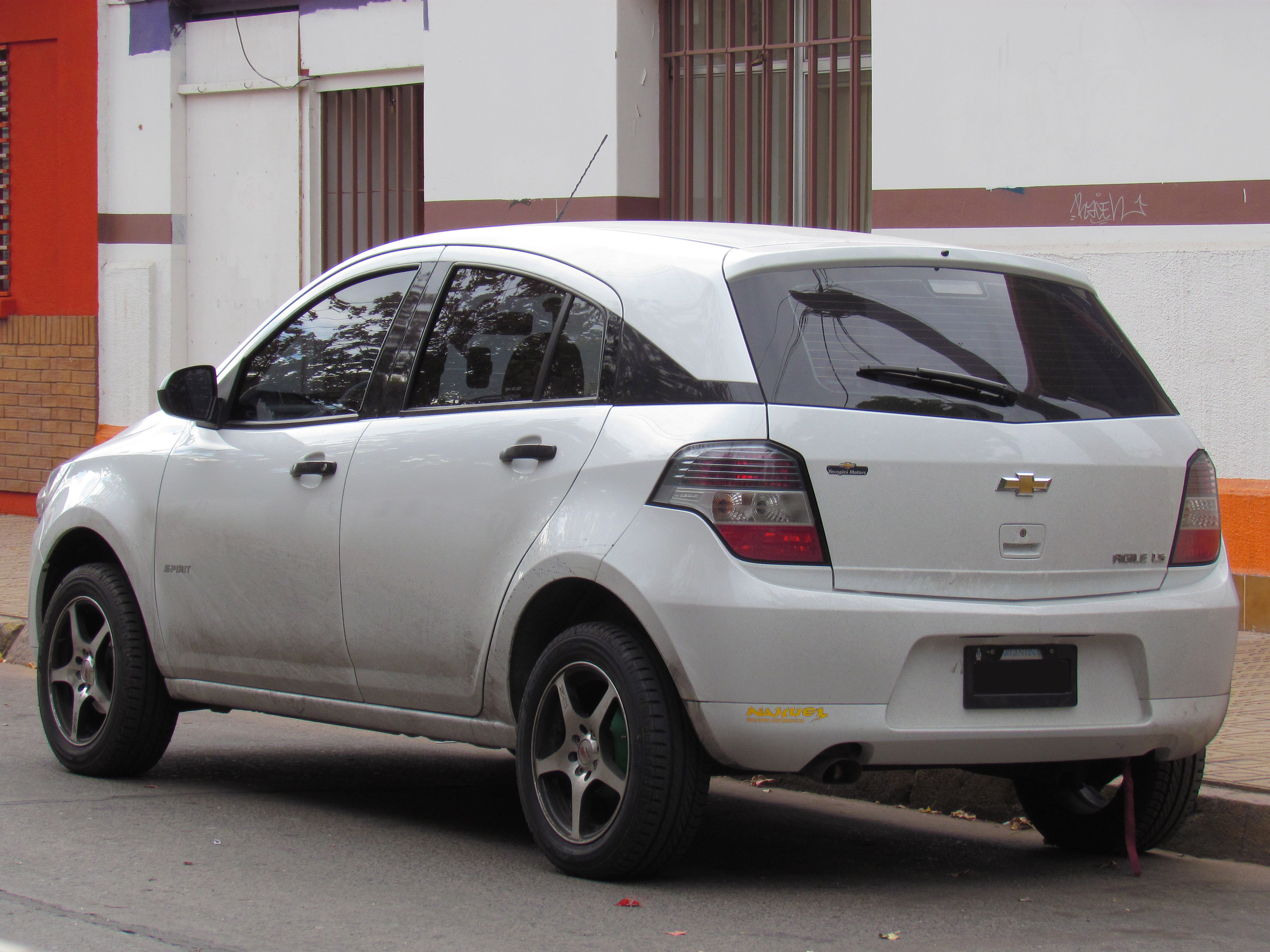
Rear view

In August 2013, a facelift version of the Agile was launched. This redesign slightly affected the interior, which received a multifunction steering wheel (LTZ version only), new upholstery and subtle changes to the dashboard. On the exterior, the changes focused on the headlights, bumpers, grille and part of the front end. The rear was altered too, with a reflective bumpers and contact areas for parking markers in black plastic were added. The light alloy wheels were also modified in the LTZ version.

The face-lift Agile continued to offer the same 1.4 8v 92 hp petrol engine, along with a five-speed manual gearbox.

In addition to offering ABS brakes and double front airbags as standard equipment, no structural modifications were made despite being classified as unstable after the crash test carried out in the past by LatinNcap.

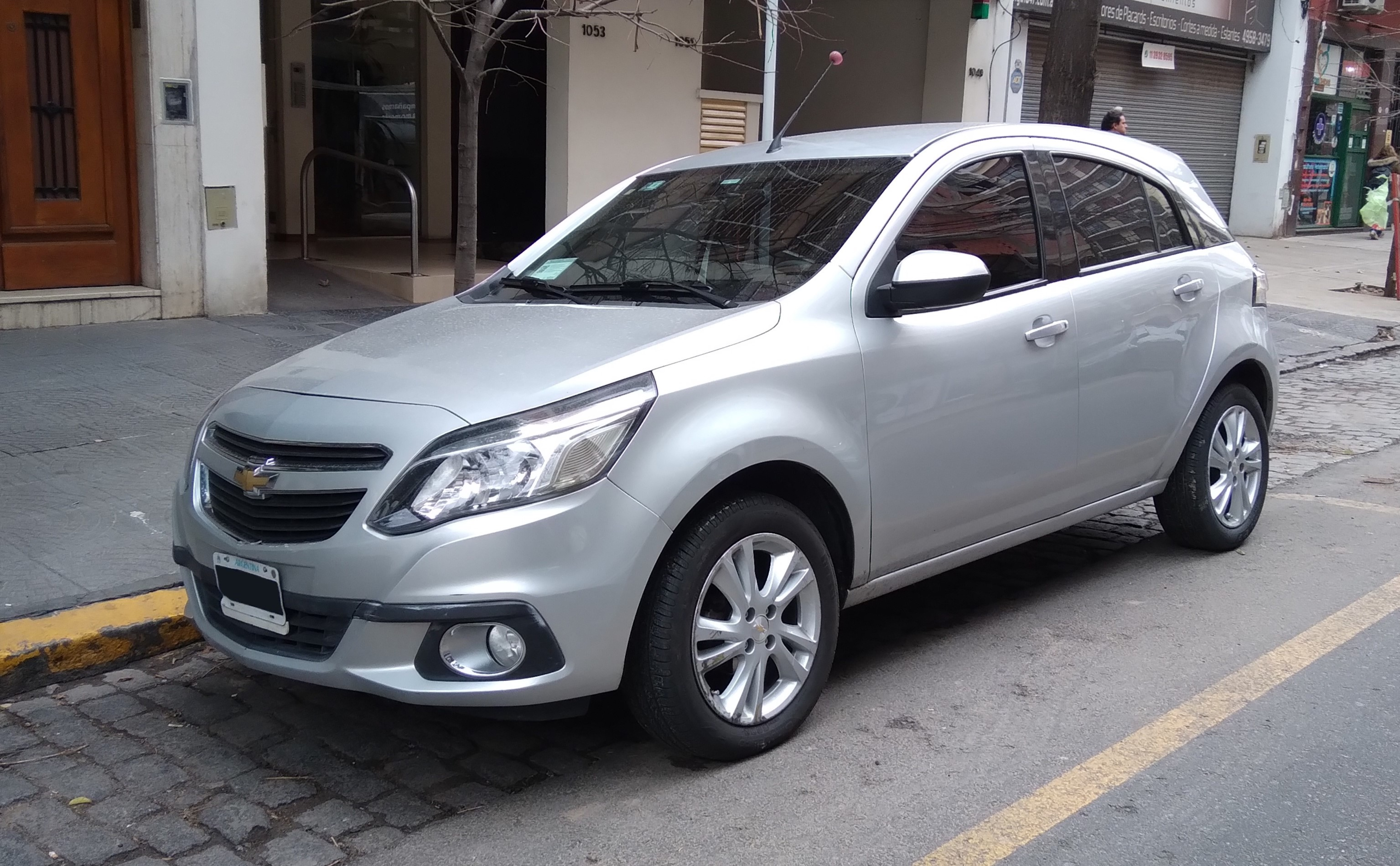
2014 Chevrolet Agile LT (facelift)

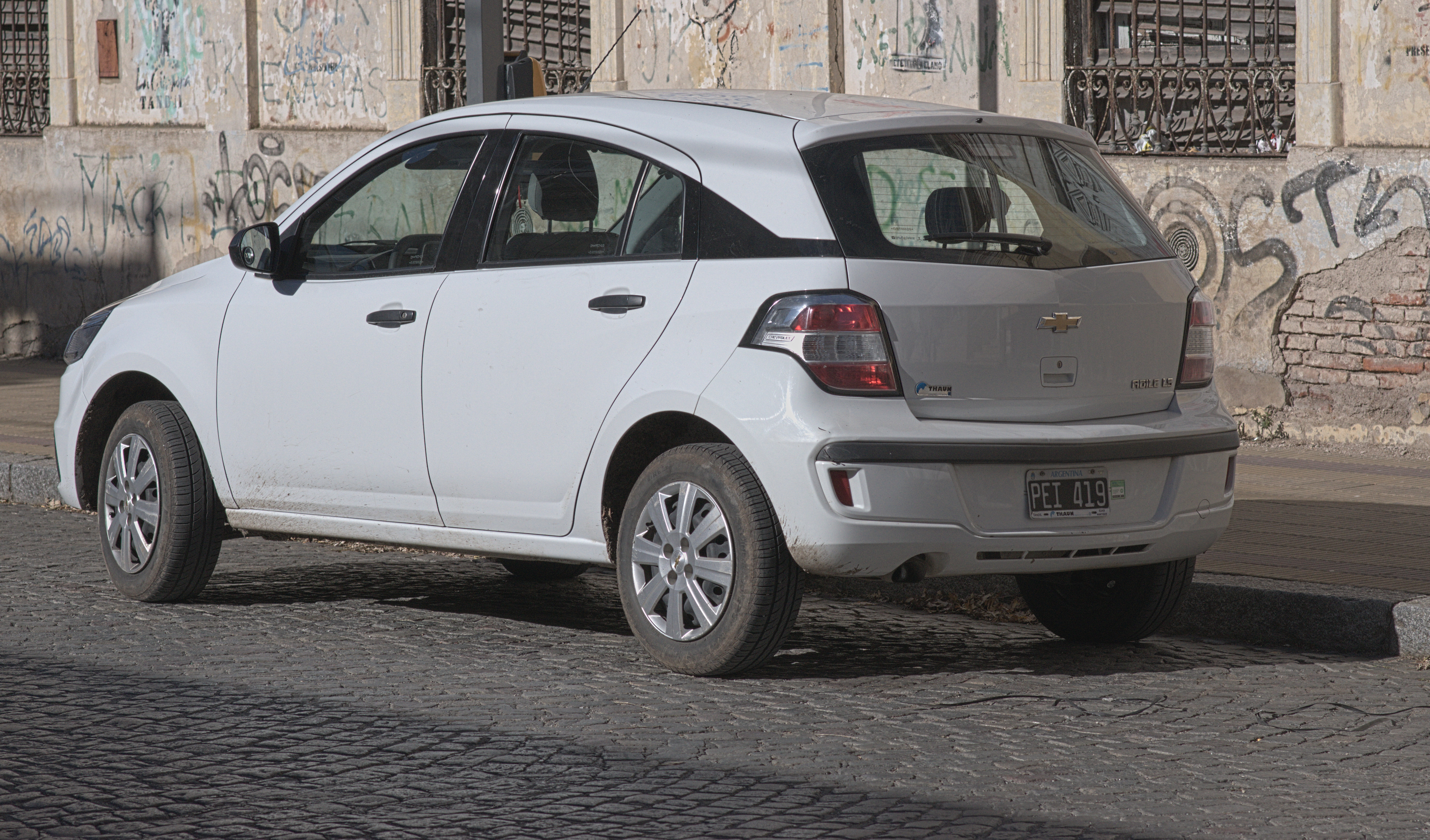
Rear view

The Agile was available in two trim levels; LT and LTZ, with a base LS in some markets. Anti-lock braking systems are available on the LTZ model. With the facelift Agile in 2013, a new sporty top trim level (called Effect) was added. It was discontinued in 2015.

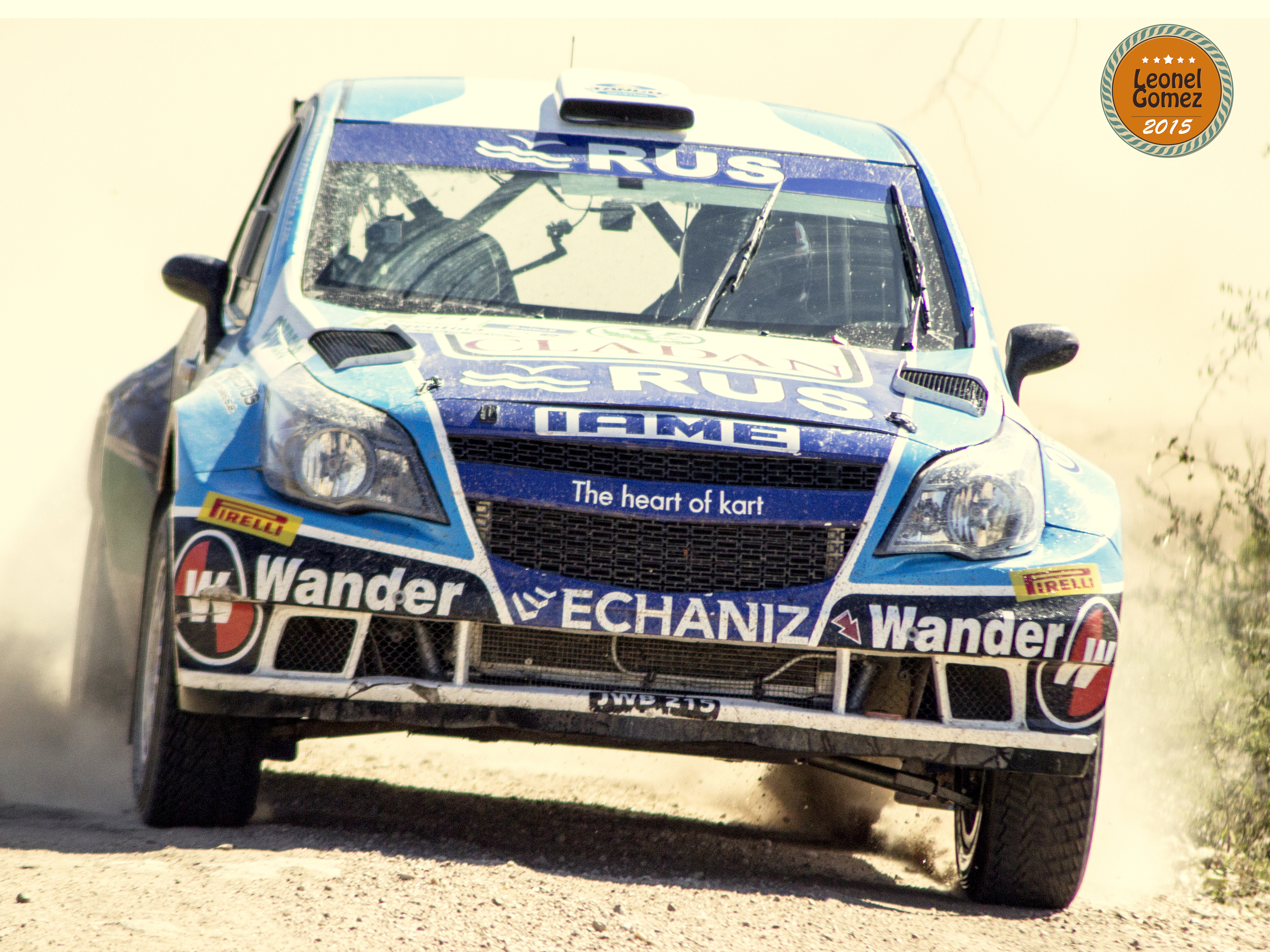
2015 Chevrolet Agile MR rally car

== Engines ==
The Chevrolet Agile is only powered by a Family 1 engine 1.4 L flex-fuel engine.

In most South American markets, the 1389cc engine produces 92 PS (68 kW; 91 bhp) and 120 N⋅m (89 lb⋅ft). The Brazilian Agile Flexfuel 1.4L 8-valve engine produces 97 PS (71 kW; 96 bhp) and 129 N⋅m (95 lb⋅ft) torque with petrol, 102 PS (75 kW; 101 bhp) and 132 N⋅m (97 lb⋅ft) with ethanol.

== Safety ==
The Chevrolet Agile in its most basic Latin American market configuration with no airbags and no ABS has been rated as totally unsafe by Latin NCAP 1.0 in 2013, scoring zero stars for adult occupants and two stars for children.

Latin NCAP 1.5 test results Chevrolet Agile - NO Airbags (2013, similar to Euro NCAP 2002)
Test	Points	Stars
Adult occupant:	0.00/17.0	0 /5 stars
Child occupant:	16.35/49.00	2 /5 stars

== Related models ==
The second generation Chevrolet Montana coupé utility uses the chassis and front fascia from the Chevrolet Agile. It was made between 2010 and 2021 in Brazil. The Montana became known as the Chevrolet Montana, Tornado, or Utility, depending on the market.

== Replacement ==
By early 2012, General Motors stated that the Agile replacement would be a new global car. It would be manufactured in Argentina in 2015 for the year 2016. However, with the launch in Argentina of the Brazilian-made Chevrolet Onix around mid-2013; the Agile was positioned as a more economical model.

Production of the Agile ended in 2016 with the Onix finally succeeding it.

== Sales ==
Year	Brazil
2009	14,394
2010	67,703
2011	73,260
2012	54,052
2013	30,123
2014	9,831
2015	50
