= Marcos Ligato =

Argentine rally driver (born 1977)

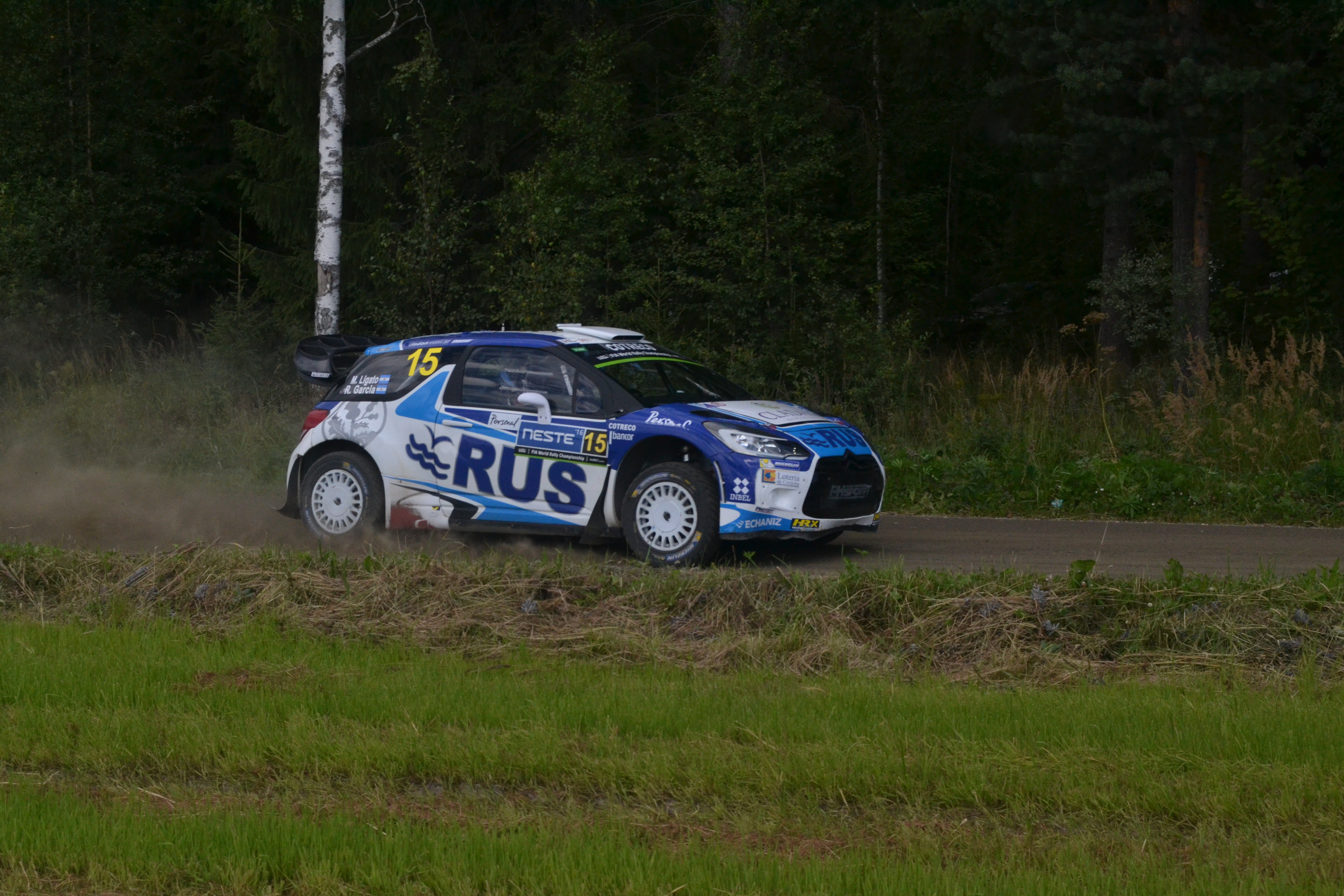
- Marcos Ligato at the 2016 Rally Finland

Personal information
- Nationality: (Argentina) Argentine
- Born: 22 November 1977 (age 48); Rio Ceballos, Argentina

World Rally Championship record
- Years active: 1998–2009, 2012–2013, 2015–2016
- Co-driver: (Argentina) Rubén García (Argentina) Santiago Garcia (Argentina) Jorge Del Buono (Argentina) Diego Curletto
- Teams: Top Run, Subaru Argentina Rally Team, Tango Rally Team
- Rallies: 62
- Championships: 0
- Rally wins: 0
- Podiums: 0
- Stage wins: 0
- Total points: 6
- First rally: 1998 Rally Argentina
- Last rally: 2016 Rally Finland

Marcos Ligato (born 22 November 1977) is an Argentine rally driver.

== Career ==
Ligato made his WRC debut in 1998. In the 1998 Rally Argentina he finished 14th overall and 3rd in PWRC.

Ligato has raced in classes like JWRC in 2003 and the PWRC from 1998 to 2012 as well as the IRC. His first win in any class was PWRC Rally New Zealand in 2012. In 2016, Ligato scored his first-ever WRC points at Rally Argentina in his first event in the Citroën DS3 WRC.

== Career results ==
=== WRC results (incomplete) ===
Year	Entrant	Car	1	2	3	4	5	6	7	8	9	10	11	12	13	14	Pos.	Points
2016	Marcos Ligato	Citroën DS3 WRC	MON	SWE	MEX	ARG; 7	POR	ITA	POL	FIN; 44	GER	CHN; C	FRA	ESP	GBR	AUS	20th	6
