= Diego Domínguez (rally driver) =

Personal information
- Nationality: (Paraguay) Paraguayan
- Born: December 20, 1972 (age 53)

World Rally Championship record
- Years active: 2000–2015
- Rallies: 4
- Championships: 0
- Rally wins: 0
- Podiums: 0
- Total points: 4
- First rally: 2000 Rally Argentina
- Last rally: 2015 Rally Argentina

Diego Hugo Domínguez Stroessner born December 20, 1972, is a rally driver from Paraguay who currently competes in the Paraguay Rally Championship. He made his WRC debut at the 2000 Rally Argentina and at the 2015 rally scored his first ever WRC points.

Domínguez's son Diego Jr. is also a rally driver.

== Career results ==
=== WRC results ===
Year	Entrant	Car	1	2	3	4	5	6	7	8	9	10	11	12	13	14	Pos.	Points
2000	Diego Domínguez	SEAT Ibiza GTi 16V	MON	SWE	KEN	POR	ESP	ARG; Ret	GRE	NZL	FIN	CYP	FRA	ITA	AUS	GBR	NC	0
2001	Diego Domínguez	SEAT Ibiza GTi 16V	MON	SWE	POR	ESP	ARG; Ret	CYP	GRE	KEN	FIN	NZL	ITA	FRA	AUS	GBR	NC	0
2014	Diego Domínguez	Ford Fiesta R5	MON	SWE	MEX	POR	ARG; 12	ITA	POL	FIN	GER	AUS	FRA	ESP	GBR		NC	0
2015	Diego Domínguez	Ford Fiesta R5	MON	SWE	MEX	ARG; 8	POR	ITA	POL	FIN	GER	AUS	FRA	ESP	GBR		21st	4

==== WRC-2 results ====
Year	Entrant	Car	1	2	3	4	5	6	7	8	9	10	11	12	13	Pos.	Points
2014	Diego Domínguez	Ford Fiesta R5	MON	SWE	MEX	POR	ARG; 3	ITA	POL	FIN	GER	AUS	FRA	ESP	GBR	22nd	15
2015	Diego Domínguez	Ford Fiesta R5	MON	SWE	MEX	ARG; 2	POR	ITA	POL	FIN	GER	AUS	FRA	ESP	GBR	21st	18

=== IRC results ===
Year	Entrant	Car	1	2	3	4	5	6	7	8	9	10	11	12	Pos	Points
2010	(Paraguay) Diego Domínguez	Mitsubishi Lancer Evo X	MON	BRA	ARG; 8	CAN	ITA	BEL	AZO	MAD	CZE	ITA	SCO	CYP	52nd	1
