= Gustavo Saba =

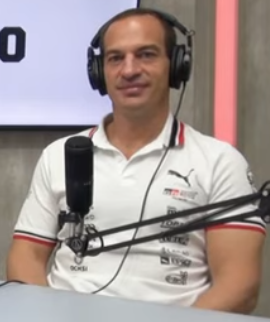
- In an Última Hora interview in 2025

Personal information
- Nationality: (Paraguay) Paraguayan
- Born: July 24, 1979 (age 47)

World Rally Championship record
- Years active: 2012–present
- Teams: Saba Competición and a collaboration with Team Sanchez
- Rallies: 6
- Championships: 0
- Rally wins: 0
- Podiums: 0
- Total points: 2
- First rally: 2012 Rally Argentina
- Last rally: 2018 Rally Argentina

Gustavo Saba (born July 24, 1979) is a rally driver from Paraguay. He has competed in the Codasur South American Rally Championship as well as the Argentine round of the World Rally Championship. He made his WRC debut during the 2012 Rally Argentina and at the 2015 rally scored his first ever WRC points.

Saba is the most successful driver in the history of the Codasur South American Rally Championship having won the championship seven times between 2011 and 2022. In October 2025, he won the Tranchaco Rally, also known as the Rally del Chaco event, in Paraguay.

== Career results ==
=== IRC results ===
| Year | Entrant | Car | 1 | 2 | 3 | 4 | 5 | 6 | 7 | 8 | 9 | 10 | 11 | 12 | Pos | Points |
|---|---|---|---|---|---|---|---|---|---|---|---|---|---|---|---|---|
| 2010 | (Paraguay) Gustavo Sanchez | Mitsubishi Lancer Evo X | MON | BRA | ARG; 20 | CAN | ITA | BEL | AZO | MAD | CZE | ITA | SCO | CYP | NC | 0 |

=== WRC results ===
| Year | Entrant | Car | 1 | 2 | 3 | 4 | 5 | 6 | 7 | 8 | 9 | 10 | 11 | 12 | 13 | Pos. | Points |
|---|---|---|---|---|---|---|---|---|---|---|---|---|---|---|---|---|---|
| 2012 | Gustavo Saba | Mitsubishi Lancer Evo X R4 | MON | SWE | MEX | POR | ARG; Ret | GRE | NZL | FIN | GER | GBR | FRA | ITA | ESP | NC | 0 |
| 2013 | Saba Competición | Škoda Fabia S2000 | MON | SWE | MEX | POR | ARG; 14 | GRE | ITA | FIN | GER | AUS | FRA | ESP | GBR | NC | 0 |
| 2014 | Gustavo Saba | Škoda Fabia S2000 | MON | SWE | MEX | POR | ARG; Ret | ITA | POL | FIN | GER | AUS | FRA | ESP | GBR | NC | 0 |
| 2015 | Saba Competición | Škoda Fabia S2000 | MON | SWE | MEX | ARG; 9 | POR | ITA | POL | FIN | GER | AUS | FRA | ESP | GBR | 28th | 2 |

==== WRC-2 results ====
| Year | Entrant | Car | 1 | 2 | 3 | 4 | 5 | 6 | 7 | 8 | 9 | 10 | 11 | 12 | 13 | Pos. | Points |
|---|---|---|---|---|---|---|---|---|---|---|---|---|---|---|---|---|---|
| 2014 | Gustavo Saba | Škoda Fabia S2000 | MON | SWE | MEX | POR | ARG; Ret | ITA | POL | FIN | GER | AUS | FRA | ESP | GBR | NC | 0 |
