= List of 2014 motorsport champions =

2014 motorsport champions
Previous: 2013	Next: 2015

This list of 2014 motorsport champions is a list of national or international motorsport series with championships decided by the points or positions earned by a driver from multiple races where the season was completed during the 2014 calendar year.

== Air racing ==
Series	Pilot	refer
Red Bull Air Race World Championship	(United Kingdom) Nigel Lamb	2014 Red Bull Air Race World Championship
Red Bull Air Race World Championship	Challenger: (France) François Le Vot	2014 Red Bull Air Race World Championship

== Dirt oval racing ==
Series	Champion	Refer
Lucas Oil Late Model Dirt Series	(United States) Don O'Neal	
World of Outlaws Late Model Series	(United States) Darrell Lanigan	
World of Outlaws Sprint Car Series	(United States) Donny Schatz	
World of Outlaws Sprint Car Series	Teams: (United States) Tony Stewart Racing	

== Drag racing ==
Series	Champion	Refer
NHRA Mello Yello Drag Racing Series	Top Fuel: (United States) Tony Schumacher	2014 NHRA Mello Yello Drag Racing Series
NHRA Mello Yello Drag Racing Series	Funny Car: (United States) Matt Hagan	2014 NHRA Mello Yello Drag Racing Series
NHRA Mello Yello Drag Racing Series	Pro Stock: (United States) Erica Enders	2014 NHRA Mello Yello Drag Racing Series
NHRA Mello Yello Drag Racing Series	Pro Stock Motorcycle: (United States) Andrew Hines	2014 NHRA Mello Yello Drag Racing Series
European Drag Racing Championship	Top Fuel: (Sweden) Micke Kågered	
European Drag Racing Championship	Top Methanol Dragster: (Malta) Chris Polidano	
European Drag Racing Championship	Top Methanol Funny Car: (Sweden) Johan Lindberg	
European Drag Racing Championship	Pro Stock Car: (Sweden) Jimmy Ålund	
European Drag Racing Championship	Pro Stock Modified: (Sweden) Mattias Wulcan	

== Drifting ==
Series	Champion	Refer
British Drift Championship	(United Kingdom) Richard Grindrod	2014 British Drift Championship
British Drift Championship	Super Pro: (United Kingdom) Shane O'Sullivan	2014 British Drift Championship
British Drift Championship	Semi-Pro: (United Kingdom) Matt Stevenson	2014 British Drift Championship
D1 Grand Prix	(Japan) Kuniaki Takahashi	2014 D1 Grand Prix series
D1 Grand Prix	D1SL: (Japan) Naoki Nakamura	2014 D1 Grand Prix series
D1NZ	(New Zealand) Gaz Whiter	2013–14 D1NZ season
D1NZ	Pro-Sport: (New Zealand) Vincent Langhorn	2013–14 D1NZ season
Drift Allstars	(Republic of Ireland) James Deane	2014 Drift Allstars
Drift Masters	(Poland) Piotr Więcek	2014 Drift Masters
Formula D	(United States) Chris Forsberg	2014 Formula D season
Formula D	PROSPEC: (United States) Dan Savage	2014 Formula D season
Formula D	Manufacturers: (Japan) Scion	2014 Formula D season
Formula D	Tire Cup: (South Korea) Hankook	2014 Formula D season
Formula D Asia	(Norway) Fredric Aasbø	2014 Formula D Asia season

== Karting ==
Series	Driver	Season article
CIK-FIA Karting World Championship	KF: (United Kingdom) Lando Norris	
CIK-FIA Karting World Championship	KFJ: (Pakistan) Enaam Ahmed	
CIK-FIA Karting World Championship	KZ: (Italy) Marco Ardigo	
CIK-FIA Karting World Championship	KZ2: (Netherlands) Ryan van der Burgt	
CIK-FIA Karting Academy Trophy	(Netherlands) Richard Verschoor	2014 CIK-FIA Karting Academy Trophy
CIK-FIA Karting European Championship	KF: (United Kingdom) Callum Ilott	
CIK-FIA Karting European Championship	KZ: (Belgium) Rick Dreezen	
CIK-FIA Karting European Championship	KF-J: (United Kingdom) Enaam Ahmed	
CIK-FIA Karting European Championship	KZ2: (Italy) Andrea Dalè	
WSK Champions Cup	KZ2: (United Kingdom) Ben Hanley	
WSK Champions Cup	KF: (Poland) Karol Basz	
WSK Champions Cup	KFJ: (United Kingdom) Enaam Ahmed	
WSK Champions Cup	60 Mini: (Malaysia) Muizzuddin Gafar	
Rotax Max Challenge	DD2: (United Kingdom) Sean Babington	
Rotax Max Challenge	DD2 Masters: (Finland) Mikko Laine	
Rotax Max Challenge	Senior: (Spain) Carlos Gil	
Rotax Max Challenge	Junior: (Estonia) Jüri Vips	
Rotax Max Challenge	Nations Cup: South Africa	

== Motorcycle racing ==
Series	Rider	refer
MotoGP World Championship	(Spain) Marc Márquez	2014 MotoGP season
MotoGP World Championship	Constructors: (Japan) Honda	2014 MotoGP season
Moto2 World Championship	(Spain) Esteve Rabat	2014 Moto2 season
Moto2 World Championship	Constructors: (Germany) Kalex	2014 Moto2 season
Moto3 World Championship	(Spain) Álex Márquez	2014 Moto3 season
Moto3 World Championship	Constructors: (Austria) KTM	2014 Moto3 season
Superbike World Championship	(France) Sylvain Guintoli	2014 Superbike World Championship
Superbike World Championship	Manufacturers: (Italy) Aprilia	2014 Superbike World Championship
Supersport World Championship	(Netherlands) Michael van der Mark	2014 Supersport World Championship
Supersport World Championship	Manufacturers: (Japan) Honda	2014 Supersport World Championship
FIM Superstock 1000 Cup	(Argentina) Leandro Mercado	2014 FIM Superstock 1000 Cup
FIM Superstock 1000 Cup	Manufacturers: (Japan) Kawasaki	2014 FIM Superstock 1000 Cup
European Superstock 600 Championship	(Italy) Marco Faccani	2014 European Superstock 600 Championship
European Junior Cup	(Spain) Augusto Fernández	2014 European Junior Cup
Red Bull MotoGP Rookies Cup	(Spain) Jorge Martín	2014 Red Bull MotoGP Rookies Cup
Australian Superbike Championship	(Australia) Glenn Allerton	

== Open wheel racing ==
Series	Champion	refer
FIA Formula One World Championship	(United Kingdom) Lewis Hamilton	2014 Formula One season
FIA Formula One World Championship	Constructors: (Germany) Mercedes	2014 Formula One season
GP2 Series	(United Kingdom) Jolyon Palmer	2014 GP2 Series
GP2 Series	Teams: (France) DAMS	2014 GP2 Series
GP3 Series	(United Kingdom) Alex Lynn	2014 GP3 Series
GP3 Series	Teams: (United Kingdom) Carlin	2014 GP3 Series
IndyCar Series	(Australia) Will Power	2014 IndyCar Series
IndyCar Series	Manufacturers: (United States) Chevrolet	2014 IndyCar Series
IndyCar Series	Rookie: (Colombia) Carlos Muñoz	2014 IndyCar Series
Super Formula	(Japan) Kazuki Nakajima	2014 Super Formula Championship
Super Formula	Teams: (Japan) PetronasTeam TOM'S	2014 Super Formula Championship
Indy Lights	(Colombia) Gabby Chaves	2014 Indy Lights
ADAC Formel Masters	(Denmark) Mikkel Jensen	2014 ADAC Formel Masters
ADAC Formel Masters	Teams: (Austria) Neuhauser Racing Team	2014 ADAC Formel Masters
Atlantic Championship	(Canada) Daniel Burkett	2014 Atlantic Championship
Auto GP	(Japan) Kimiya Sato	2014 Auto GP Series
Auto GP	Teams: (United Kingdom) Super Nova International	2014 Auto GP Series
BOSS GP Series	(Poland) Jakub Śmiechowski	2014 BOSS GP Series
BOSS GP Series	Teams: (Poland) Inter Europol Competition	2014 BOSS GP Series
BOSS GP Series	Formula: (Poland) Jakub Śmiechowski	2014 BOSS GP Series
BOSS GP Series	Masters: (Germany) Hans Laub	2014 BOSS GP Series
F2000 Italian Formula Trophy	(Italy) Marco Zanasi	2014 F2000 Italian Formula Trophy
F2000 Italian Formula Trophy	Teams: (Italy) Tomcat Racing	2014 F2000 Italian Formula Trophy
FIA Masters Historic Formula One Championship	Fittipaldi/Stewart: (Switzerland) Manfredo Rossi di Montelera	2014 FIA Masters Historic Formula One Championship
FIA Masters Historic Formula One Championship	Head/Lauda: (United Kingdom) Steve Hartley	2014 FIA Masters Historic Formula One Championship
Formula Acceleration 1	(Netherlands) Nigel Melker	2014 Formula Acceleration 1 season
Formula Acceleration 1	Teams: Team Netherlands	2014 Formula Acceleration 1 season
Formula Masters China	(New Zealand) James Munro	2014 Formula Masters China
Formula Masters China	Teams: (Hong Kong) Cebu Pacific Air by KCMG	2014 Formula Masters China
Formula Russia	(Russia) Mikhail Loboda	
MRF Challenge Formula 2000 Championship	(United Kingdom) Rupert Svendsen-Cook	2013–14 MRF Challenge Formula 2000 Championship
Pro Mazda Championship	(United States) Spencer Pigot	2014 Pro Mazda Championship
Toyota Racing Series	(Singapore) Andrew Tang	2014 Toyota Racing Series
Toyota Racing Series	Teams: (New Zealand) Giles Motorsport	2014 Toyota Racing Series
Formula Three
FIA Formula 3 European Championship	(France) Esteban Ocon	2014 FIA Formula 3 European Championship
FIA Formula 3 European Championship	Teams: (Italy) Prema Powerteam	2014 FIA Formula 3 European Championship
FIA Formula 3 European Championship	Rookie: (France) Esteban Ocon	2014 FIA Formula 3 European Championship
Australian Drivers' Championship	(Australia) Simon Hodge	2014 Australian Drivers' Championship
Australian Drivers' Championship	National: (Australia) Garnet Patterson	2014 Australian Drivers' Championship
Australian Drivers' Championship	Kumho Cup: (Australia) Roland Legge	2014 Australian Drivers' Championship
British Formula 3 Championship	(China) Martin Cao	2014 British Formula Three Championship
German Formula Three Championship	(Germany) Markus Pommer	2014 German Formula Three Championship
German Formula Three Championship	Teams: (Germany) Lotus	2014 German Formula Three Championship
German Formula Three Championship	Rookie: (Netherlands) Indy Dontje	2014 German Formula Three Championship
Euroformula Open Championship	(Thailand) Sandy Stuvik	2014 Euroformula Open Championship
Euroformula Open Championship	Copa: (Italy) Costantino Peroni	2014 Euroformula Open Championship
Euroformula Open Championship	Teams: (Italy) RP Motorsport	2014 Euroformula Open Championship
Spanish Formula Three	(Thailand) Sandy Stuvik	2014 Euroformula Open Championship
Spanish Formula Three	Copa: (Italy) Costantino Peroni	2014 Euroformula Open Championship
Spanish Formula Three	Teams: (Italy) RP Motorsport	2014 Euroformula Open Championship
All-Japan Formula Three Championship	(Japan) Nobuharu Matsushita	2014 Japanese Formula 3 Championship
All-Japan Formula Three Championship	Teams: (Japan) TOM'S	2014 Japanese Formula 3 Championship
All-Japan Formula Three Championship	National: (Japan) Hiroshi Koizumi	2014 Japanese Formula 3 Championship
Fórmula 3 Brasil	(Brazil) Pedro Piquet	2014 Fórmula 3 Brasil season
Fórmula 3 Brasil	Class B: (Brazil) Vitor Baptista	2014 Fórmula 3 Brasil season
Fórmula 3 Brasil	Teams: (Brazil) Cesário F3	2014 Fórmula 3 Brasil season
MotorSport Vision Formula Three Cup	(United Kingdom) Toby Sowery	2014 MotorSport Vision Formula Three Cup
MotorSport Vision Formula Three Cup	Teams: (United Kingdom) Omicron Motorsport	2014 MotorSport Vision Formula Three Cup
MotorSport Vision Formula Three Cup	Cup: (United Kingdom) Toby Sowery	2014 MotorSport Vision Formula Three Cup
MotorSport Vision Formula Three Cup	Trophy: (Australia) Oliver Rae	2014 MotorSport Vision Formula Three Cup
Formula Renault
Formula Renault 3.5 Series	(Spain) Carlos Sainz Jr.	2014 Formula Renault 3.5 Series
Formula Renault 3.5 Series	Teams: (France) DAMS	2014 Formula Renault 3.5 Series
Eurocup Formula Renault 2.0	(Netherlands) Nyck de Vries	2014 Eurocup Formula Renault 2.0
Eurocup Formula Renault 2.0	Teams: (Finland) Koiranen GP	2014 Eurocup Formula Renault 2.0
Formula Renault 2.0 Alps	(Netherlands) Nyck de Vries	2014 Formula Renault 2.0 Alps Series
Formula Renault 2.0 Alps	Teams: (Finland) Koiranen GP	2014 Formula Renault 2.0 Alps Series
Formula Renault 2.0 Alps	Junior: (Monaco) Charles Leclerc	2014 Formula Renault 2.0 Alps Series
Formula Renault 2.0 Northern European Cup	(United Kingdom) Ben Barnicoat	2014 Formula Renault 2.0 Northern European Cup
Formula Renault 2.0 Northern European Cup	Teams: (Germany) Josef Kaufmann Racing	2014 Formula Renault 2.0 Northern European Cup
Protyre Formula Renault Championship	(Brazil) Pietro Fittipaldi	2014 Protyre Formula Renault Championship
Formula Renault 1.6 NEC	(Australia) Anton de Pasquale	2014 Formula Renault 1.6 NEC season
Formula Renault 1.6 NEC	Teams: (Austria) Lechner Racing School	2014 Formula Renault 1.6 NEC season
Formula Renault 1.6 Nordic	(Finland) Joonas Lappalainen	2014 Formula Renault 1.6 Nordic season
Formula Renault 1.6 Nordic	JSM: (Sweden) Lukas Sundahl	2014 Formula Renault 1.6 Nordic season
Formula Renault 2.0 Argentina	(Argentina) Manuel Mallo	2014 Formula Renault 2.0 Argentina
Formula Renault 1.6 NEZ	(Finland) Joonas Lappalainen	2014 Formula Renault 1.6 NEZ season
V de V Challenge Monoplace	(Italy) Daniele Cazzaniga	2014 V de V Challenge Monoplace
Formula 4
BRDC Formula 4 Championship	(United Kingdom) George Russell	2014 BRDC Formula 4 Championship
French F4 Championship	(Denmark) Lasse Sørensen	2014 French F4 Championship
French F4 Championship	Junior: (France) Dorian Boccolacci	2014 French F4 Championship
French F4 Championship	International: (Denmark) Lasse Sørensen	2014 French F4 Championship
Italian F4 Championship	(Canada) Lance Stroll	2014 Italian F4 Championship
Italian F4 Championship	Trophy: (France) Brandon Maïsano	2014 Italian F4 Championship
Italian F4 Championship	Teams: (Italy) Prema Powerteam	2014 Italian F4 Championship
Formula 4 Sudamericana	(Brazil) Bruno Baptista	2014 Formula 4 Sudamericana season
JAF Japan Formula 4	East: (Japan) Yuichi Mikasa	2014 JAF Japan Formula 4
JAF Japan Formula 4	West: (Japan) Yūya Hiraki	2014 JAF Japan Formula 4
Formula Ford
Australian Formula Ford Series	(Australia) Thomas Randle	2014 Australian Formula Ford Series
British Formula Ford Championship	(South Africa) Jayde Kruger	2014 British Formula Ford Championship
British Formula Ford Championship	Scholarship: (United Kingdom) Ashley Sutton	2014 British Formula Ford Championship
F1600 Championship Series	(Norway) Ayla Ågren	2014 F1600 Championship Series
Pacific F2000 Championship	(United States) Andrew Evans	2014 Pacific F2000 Championship
U.S. F2000 National Championship	(France) Florian Latorre	2014 U.S. F2000 National Championship
U.S. F2000 Winterfest	(United States) R. C. Enerson	2014 U.S. F2000 Winterfest
New Zealand Formula Ford Championship	(New Zealand) Jamie Conroy	2013–14 New Zealand Formula Ford Championship
Scottish Formula Ford Championship	(United Kingdom) Ciaran Haggerty	
Toyo Tires F1600 Championship Series	(United States) Tristan DeGrand	2014 Toyo Tires F1600 Championship Series

== Powerboat racing ==
Series	Driver	refer
F1 Powerboat World Championship	(France) Philippe Chiappe	2014 F1 Powerboat World Championship
F1 Powerboat World Championship	Teams: Qatar Team	2014 F1 Powerboat World Championship

== Radio-controlled racing ==
=== 1:8 On-Road ===
Series	Champion	refer
EFRA 1:8 IC Track European Championship	(Italy) Dario Balestri	
ROAR 1:8 Fuel On-Road National Championship	(United States) Mike Swauger	
Campionato Italiano 1:8 Gare Pista	(Italy) Dario Balestri	
Deutsche Meisterschaften Verbrenner Glattbahn 1:8 Klasse 1	(Germany) Robert Pietsch	
JMRCA All-Japan 1:8 GP On-Road Championship	(Japan) Shinnosuke Yokoyama	

=== 1:10 Off-Road ===
Series	Champion	refer
ROAR 10th Electric Off-Road National Championship	2WD: (United States) Dakotah Phend	
ROAR 10th Electric Off-Road National Championship	4WD: (Canada) Ty Tessmann	
JMRCA All-Japan 1:10 EP Off-Road Championship	2WD: (Japan) Naoto Matsukura	
JMRCA All-Japan 1:10 EP Off-Road Championship	4WD: (Japan) Naoto Matsukura	
EFRA 1:10 Electric Off-Road European Championship	2WD: (Germany) Jörn Neumann	
EFRA 1:10 Electric Off-Road European Championship	4WD: (Germany) Jörn Neumann	
BRCA 1:10 Electric Off-Road Championship	2WD: (United Kingdom) Darren Bloomfield	
BRCA 1:10 Electric Off-Road Championship	4WD: (United Kingdom) Neil Cragg	
Sverige Cupen 1:10 Off-Road	2WD: (Sweden) David Ronnefalk	
Sverige Cupen 1:10 Off-Road	4WD: (Sweden) David Ronnefalk	

=== 1:10 Electric Touring Car ===
Series	Champion	refer
IFMAR ISTC World Championship	(Japan) Naoto Matsukura	
JMRCA All-Japan 1:10 EP Touring Car Championship	Super Expert: (Japan) Naoto Matsukura	
EFRA 1:10 Electric Touring Cars European Championship	(Germany) Ronald Völker	
ROAR Paved On-Road 1:10 National Championship	Touring Modified: (United States) Paul Lemieux	
ROAR Electric Carpet National Championship	Modified: (Canada) Keven Hebert	

=== 1:8 Off-Road ===
Series	Champion	refer
IFMAR 1:8 IC Off-Road World Championship	(Canada) Ty Tessmann	
EFRA European 1:8 IC Off-Road Championship	(Sweden) David Ronnefalk	
ROAR 1:8 Fuel Off-Road National Championship	Buggy: (Canada) Ty Tessmann	
ROAR 1:8 Fuel Off-Road National Championship	Truggy: (United States) Dakotah Phend	
JMRCA All-Japan 1:8 GP Off-Road Championship	(Japan) Kenji Tsuruta	
BRCA Rallycross National Championship	(United Kingdom) Darren Bloomfield	
FEMCA 1:8 Off-Road Championship	(Japan) Atsushi Hara	
Campeonato de España de 1:8 TT Gas	(Spain) Robert Batlle	
Deutsche Meisterschaften Verbrenner Off-Road 1:8	(Czech Republic) Martin Bayer	
Sverige Cupen 1:8 Off-Road	(Sweden) David Ronnefalk	
ROAR 1:8 Electric Off-Road National Championships	Buggy: (United States) Dakotah Phend	
ROAR 1:8 Electric Off-Road National Championships	Truggy: (United States) Dakotah Phend	
ROAR 1:8 Electric Off-Road National Championships	SCT: (United States) Dakotah Phend	

=== 1:12 On-Road ===
Series	Champion	refer
IFMAR 1:12 On-Road World Championship	(Germany) Marc Rheinard	
EFRA 1:12 On-Road Championship	Modified: (Sweden) Alexander Hagberg	
ROAR Electric Carpet National Championship	Modified: (Canada) Keven Hebert	
JMRCA All-Japan 1:12 EP Racing Championship	(Japan) Hayato Ishioka	
Deutsche Meisterschaften Elektro 1:12 Expert	(Germany) Markus Mobers	
ROAR Paved On-Road 1:12 National Championship	Modified: (United States) Josh Cyrul	

=== 1:10 200mm Nitro Touring Car ===
Series	Champion	refer
IFMAR 1:10 200mm Nitro Touring Car World Championship	(Sweden) Alexander Hagberg	
ROAR 1:10 Fuel Sedan National Championship	(United States) Ralph Burch Jr.	

== Rallying ==
Series	Champion(s)	refer
World Rally Championship	(France) Sébastien Ogier (France) Julien Ingrassia	2014 World Rally Championship season
World Rally Championship	Manufacturers: (Germany) Volkswagen	2014 World Rally Championship season
World Rally Championship-2	(Qatar) Nasser Al-Attiyah (Italy) Giovanni Bernacchini	2014 World Rally Championship-2 season
World Rally Championship-3	(France) Stéphane Lefebvre (France) Thomas Dubois	2014 World Rally Championship-2 season
Junior World Rally Championship	(France) Stéphane Lefebvre (France) Thomas Dubois	2014 Junior World Rally Championship season
Central European Zone Rally Championship	Class 2: (Hungary) Norbert Herczig	2014 Central European Zone Rally Championship
Central European Zone Rally Championship	Production: (Croatia) Juraj Šebalj	2014 Central European Zone Rally Championship
Central European Zone Rally Championship	2WD: (Slovenia) Rok Turk	2014 Central European Zone Rally Championship
Central European Zone Rally Championship	Historic: (Italy) Paolo Pasutti	2014 Central European Zone Rally Championship
Czech Rally Championship	(Czech Republic) Václav Pech	2014 Czech Rally Championship
Czech Rally Championship	Co-Drivers: (Czech Republic) Petr Uhel	2014 Czech Rally Championship
Deutsche Rallye Meisterschaft	(Germany) Ruben Zeltner	
Drive DMACK Trophy	(Estonia) Sander Pärn (United Kingdom) James Morgan	2014 Drive DMACK Cup season
Estonian Rally Championship	EMV1: (Estonia) Timmu Kõrge	2014 Estonian Rally Championship
Estonian Rally Championship	EMV1 Co-Drivers: (Estonia) Erki Pints	2014 Estonian Rally Championship
Estonian Rally Championship	EMV2: (Russia) Aleksey Lukyanuk	2014 Estonian Rally Championship
Estonian Rally Championship	EMV2 Co-Drivers: (Russia) Aleksei Arnautov	2014 Estonian Rally Championship
European Rally Championship	(Finland) Esapekka Lappi (Finland) Janne Ferm	2014 European Rally Championship season
European Rally Championship	Production Cup: (Ukraine) Vitaliy Pushkar; 2WD Cup: (Hungary) Zoltán Bessenyey; ERC Junior: (France) Stéphane Lefebvre; Ladies Trophy: (Bulgaria) Ekaterina Stratieva	2014 European Rally Championship season
Hungarian Rally Championship	(Hungary) Miklós Kazár	
Hungarian Rally Championship	Co-Drivers: (Hungary) Tamás Szőke	
Indian National Rally Championship	(India) Gaurav Gill	
Indian National Rally Championship	Co-Drivers: (India) Musa Sherif	
African Rally Championship	(Ivory Coast) Gary Chaynes	2014 African Rally Championship
African Rally Championship	Co-Drivers: (France) Romain Comas	2014 African Rally Championship
Asia-Pacific Rally Championship	(Czech Republic) Jan Kopecký (Czech Republic) Pavel Dresler	2014 Asia-Pacific Rally Championship season
Asia-Pacific Rally Championship	Pacific Cup: (Czech Republic) Jan Kopecký (Czech Republic) Pavel Dresler	2014 Asia-Pacific Rally Championship season
Australian Rally Championship	(Australia) Scott Pedder	2014 Australian Rally Championship
Australian Rally Championship	Co-Drivers: (Australia) Dale Moscatt	2014 Australian Rally Championship
Codasur South American Rally Championship	(Paraguay) Diego Domínguez	2014 Codasur South American Rally Championship
French Rally Championship	(France) Julien Maurin	
Italian Rally Championship	(Italy) Paolo Andreucci	
Italian Rally Championship	Co-Drivers: (Italy) Anna Andreussi	
Italian Rally Championship	Manufacturers: (France) Peugeot	
NACAM Rally Championship	(Mexico) Ricardo Triviño	2014 NACAM Rally Championship
NACAM Rally Championship	Co-Drivers: (Mexico) Marco Hernández	2014 NACAM Rally Championship
ADAC Opel Rallye Cup	(Sweden) Emil Bergkvist	
ADAC Opel Rallye Cup	Co-Drivers: (Sweden) Joakim Sjöberg	
British Rally Championship	(Republic of Ireland) Daniel McKenna (Republic of Ireland) Arthur Kierans	2014 British Rally Championship season
Canadian Rally Championship	(Canada) Antoine L'Estage	2014 Canadian Rally Championship
Canadian Rally Championship	Co-Drivers: (Canada) Alan Ockwell	2014 Canadian Rally Championship
Middle East Rally Championship	(Qatar) Nasser Al-Attiyah	
New Zealand Rally Championship	(New Zealand) Richard Mason	2014 New Zealand Rally Championship
New Zealand Rally Championship	Co-Drivers: (New Zealand) Sara Mason	2014 New Zealand Rally Championship
Polish Rally Championship	(Poland) Wojciech Chuchała	
Rally America	(United Kingdom) David Higgins (United Kingdom) Craig Drew	2014 Rally America season
Romanian Rally Championship	(France) François Delecour	
Scottish Rally Championship	(United Kingdom) Euan Thorburn	2014 Scottish Rally Championship
Scottish Rally Championship	Co-Drivers: (United Kingdom) Paul Beaton	2014 Scottish Rally Championship
Slovak Rally Championship	(Poland) Grzegorz Grzyb	
Slovak Rally Championship	Co-Drivers: (Poland) Robert Hundla	
South African National Rally Championship	(South Africa) Leeroy Poulter	
South African National Rally Championship	Co-Drivers: (South Africa) Elvene Coetzee	
South African National Rally Championship	Manufacturers: (Japan) Toyota	
Spanish Rally Championship	(Spain) Sergio Vallejo	
Spanish Rally Championship	Co-Drivers: (Spain) Diego Vallejo	

=== Rallycross ===
Series	Champion(s)	refer
FIA World Rallycross Championship	(Norway) Petter Solberg	2014 FIA World Rallycross Championship season
FIA World Rallycross Championship	Teams: (Norway) Ford Olsberg MSE	2014 FIA World Rallycross Championship season
FIA European Rallycross Championship	SuperCars: (Sweden) Robin Larsson	2014 European Rallycross Championship season
FIA European Rallycross Championship	Super1600s: (Russia) Sergej Zagumennov	2014 European Rallycross Championship season
FIA European Rallycross Championship	TouringCars: (Sweden) Daniel Lundh	2014 European Rallycross Championship season
FIA European Rallycross Championship	RX Lites: (Sweden) Kevin Eriksson	2014 European Rallycross Championship season
Global RallyCross Championship	SuperCars: (Finland) Joni Wiman	2014 Global RallyCross Championship
Global RallyCross Championship	Manufacturers: (Germany) Volkswagen	2014 Global RallyCross Championship
Global RallyCross Championship	GRC Lites: (United States) Mitchell DeJong	2014 Global RallyCross Championship
British Rallycross Championship	(United Kingdom) Julian Godfrey	

== Sports car and GT ==
Series	Champion(s)	refer
FIA World Endurance Championship	(Switzerland) Sébastien Buemi (United Kingdom) Anthony Davidson	2014 FIA World Endurance Championship season
FIA World Endurance Championship	LMP1-L: (Switzerland) Mathias Beche (Germany) Nick Heidfeld (France) Nicolas Prost	2014 FIA World Endurance Championship season
FIA World Endurance Championship	GT: (Italy) Gianmaria Bruni (Finland) Toni Vilander	2014 FIA World Endurance Championship season
FIA World Endurance Championship	LMP2: (Russia) Sergey Zlobin	2014 FIA World Endurance Championship season
FIA World Endurance Championship	LMGTE Am Drivers: (Denmark) David Heinemeier Hansson (Denmark) Christoffer Nygaard (Denmark) Kristian Poulsen	2014 FIA World Endurance Championship season
FIA World Endurance Championship	Manufacturers: (Japan) Toyota	2014 FIA World Endurance Championship season
FIA World Endurance Championship	GT Manufacturers: (Italy) Ferrari	2014 FIA World Endurance Championship season
FIA World Endurance Championship	LMP1 Teams: (Switzerland) Rebellion Racing	2014 FIA World Endurance Championship season
FIA World Endurance Championship	LMP2 Teams: (Russia) SMP Racing	2014 FIA World Endurance Championship season
FIA World Endurance Championship	LMGTE Pro Teams: (Italy) AF Corse	2014 FIA World Endurance Championship season
FIA World Endurance Championship	LMGTE AM Teams: (United Kingdom) Aston Martin Racing	2014 FIA World Endurance Championship season
Asian Le Mans Series	LMP2: (China) David Cheng; LMP2: (China) Ho-Pin Tung	2014 Asian Le Mans Series
Asian Le Mans Series	LMP2 Teams: (France) OAK Racing	2014 Asian Le Mans Series
Asian Le Mans Series	CN: (Macau) Kevin Tse	2014 Asian Le Mans Series
Asian Le Mans Series	CN Teams: (Hong Kong) Craft-Bamboo Racing	2014 Asian Le Mans Series
Asian Le Mans Series	GT: (Taiwan) Jun San Chen; GT: (Japan) Tatsuya Tanigawa	2014 Asian Le Mans Series
Asian Le Mans Series	GT Teams: (Taiwan) AAI-Rstrada	2014 Asian Le Mans Series
United SportsCar Championship	Prototype: (Portugal) João Barbosa (Brazil) Christian Fittipaldi	2014 United SportsCar Championship season
United SportsCar Championship	PC: (United States) Jon Bennett (Portugal) Colin Braun	2014 United SportsCar Championship season
United SportsCar Championship	GTLM: (United States) Jonathan Bomarito (Canada) Kuno Wittmer	2014 United SportsCar Championship season
United SportsCar Championship	GTD: (United States) Dane Cameron	2014 United SportsCar Championship season
United SportsCar Championship	Prototype Teams: (United States) Action Express Racing	2014 United SportsCar Championship season
United SportsCar Championship	PC Teams: (United States) CORE Autosport	2014 United SportsCar Championship season
United SportsCar Championship	GTLM Teams: (United States) SRT Motorsports	2014 United SportsCar Championship season
United SportsCar Championship	GTD Teams: (United States) Turner Motorsport	2014 United SportsCar Championship season
United SportsCar Championship	Prototype Manufacturers: (United States) Chevrolet	2014 United SportsCar Championship season
United SportsCar Championship	GTLM Manufacturers: (United States) SRT	2014 United SportsCar Championship season
United SportsCar Championship	GTD Manufacturers: (Germany) Porsche	2014 United SportsCar Championship season
British GT Championship	GT3: (United Kingdom) Marco Attard	2014 British GT Championship
British GT Championship	GT4: (United Kingdom) Jake Giddings; GT4: (United Kingdom) Ross Wylie	2014 British GT Championship
European Le Mans Series	LMP2: (France) Nelson Panciatici (France) Paul-Loup Chatin (United Kingdom) Oliver Webb	2014 European Le Mans Series season
European Le Mans Series	GTE: (Italy) Andrea Bertolini (Russia) Viktor Shaitar (Russia) Sergey Zlobin	2014 European Le Mans Series season
European Le Mans Series	GTC: (Monaco) Olivier Beretta (Russia) Devi Markozov (Russia) Anton Ladygin	2014 European Le Mans Series season
European Le Mans Series	LMP2 Teams: (France) Signatech Alpine	2014 European Le Mans Series season
European Le Mans Series	GTE Teams: (Russia) SMP Racing	2014 European Le Mans Series season
European Le Mans Series	GTC Teams: (Russia) SMP Racing	2014 European Le Mans Series season
Blancpain GT Series	(Belgium) Laurens Vanthoor	2014 Blancpain GT Series season
Blancpain GT Series	Teams: (Belgium) Belgian Audi Club Team WRT	2014 Blancpain GT Series season
Blancpain Endurance Series	Pro: (Belgium) Laurens Vanthoor	2014 Blancpain Endurance Series season
Blancpain Endurance Series	Pro-Am: (Italy) Andrea Rizzoli (Italy) Stefano Gai	2014 Blancpain Endurance Series season
Blancpain Endurance Series	Gentlemen: (United Kingdom) Peter Mann (Portugal) Francisco Guedes	2014 Blancpain Endurance Series season
Blancpain Endurance Series	Pro Teams: (Belgium) Belgian Audi Club Team WRT	2014 Blancpain Endurance Series season
Blancpain Endurance Series	Pro-Am Teams: (Italy) Scuderia Villorba Corse	2014 Blancpain Endurance Series season
Blancpain Endurance Series	Gentleman Teams: (Italy) AF Corse	2014 Blancpain Endurance Series season
Blancpain Sprint Series	Pro: (Germany) Maximilian Götz	2014 Blancpain Sprint Series season
Blancpain Sprint Series	Pro-Am: (United Kingdom) Alessandro Latif (Germany) Marc Basseng	2014 Blancpain Sprint Series season
Blancpain Sprint Series	Silver Cup: (Poland) Mateusz Lisowski (France) Vincent Abril	2014 Blancpain Sprint Series season
Blancpain Sprint Series	Pro Teams: (Belgium) Belgian Audi Club Team WRT	2014 Blancpain Sprint Series season
Blancpain Sprint Series	Pro-Am Teams: (Germany) Phoenix Racing	2014 Blancpain Sprint Series season
Blancpain Sprint Series	Silver Cup Teams: (Belgium) Belgian Audi Club Team WRT	2014 Blancpain Sprint Series season
ADAC GT Masters	Overall: (Germany) René Rast (South Africa) Kelvin van der Linde	2014 ADAC GT Masters season
ADAC GT Masters	Teams: (Germany) Prosperia C. Abt Racing	2014 ADAC GT Masters season
ADAC GT Masters	Amateur: (Austria) Handlos Herbert	2014 ADAC GT Masters season
International GT Open	Overall: (Russia) Roman Mavlanov (Italy) Daniel Zampieri	2014 International GT Open season
International GT Open	Super GT: (Russia) Roman Mavlanov (Italy) Daniel Zampieri	2014 International GT Open season
International GT Open	Super GT Teams: (Netherlands) V8 Racing	2014 International GT Open season
International GT Open	Super GT Manufacturers: (United States) Chevrolet	2014 International GT Open season
International GT Open	GTS: (Italy) Giorgio Roda	2014 International GT Open season
International GT Open	GTS Teams: (Italy) AF Corse	2014 International GT Open season
International GT Open	GTS Manufacturers: (Italy) Ferrari	2014 International GT Open season
International GT Open	Gentleman: (Germany) Claudio Sdanewitsch	2014 International GT Open season
GT4 European Series	Pro: (Netherlands) Bernhard van Oranje (Netherlands) Ricardo van der Ende	2014 GT4 European Series season
GT4 European Series	Teams: (Netherlands) Racing Team Holland by Ekris Motorsport	2014 GT4 European Series season
GT4 European Series	Am: (France) André Grammatico	2014 GT4 European Series season
Australian GT Championship	(Australia) Richard Muscat	2014 Australian GT Championship season
Australian GT Championship	Trophy: (Australia) Rod Salmon	2014 Australian GT Championship season
Australian GT Championship	Challenge: (Australia) Ben Foessel	2014 Australian GT Championship season
Australian GT Championship	Sports: (Australia) Mark Griffith	2014 Australian GT Championship season
Super GT	GT500: (Japan) Tsugio Matsuda (Italy) Ronnie Quintarelli	2014 Super GT season
Super GT	GT300: (Japan) Tatsuya Kataoka (Japan) Nobuteru Taniguchi	2014 Super GT season
Super GT	GT500 Teams: (Japan) Nismo	2014 Super GT season
Super GT	GT300 Teams: (Japan) Gainer	2014 Super GT season
Porsche Carrera Cup
Porsche Supercup	(New Zealand) Earl Bamber	2014 Porsche Supercup season
Porsche Supercup	Rookie: (New Zealand) Earl Bamber	2014 Porsche Supercup season
Porsche Supercup	Teams: (Austria) VERVA Lechner Racing Team	2014 Porsche Supercup season
Porsche Carrera Cup Germany	(Austria) Philipp Eng	2014 Porsche Carrera Cup Germany
Porsche Carrera Cup Germany	Teams: (Austria) QPOD Walter Lechner Racing	2014 Porsche Carrera Cup Germany
Porsche Carrera Cup Germany	B–Class: (Switzerland) Rolf Ineichen	2014 Porsche Carrera Cup Germany
Porsche Carrera Cup Germany	Rookie: (Germany) Sven Müller	2014 Porsche Carrera Cup Germany
Porsche Carrera Cup Great Britain	(United Kingdom) Josh Webster	2014 Porsche Carrera Cup Great Britain
Porsche Carrera Cup Great Britain	Pro–Am: (United Kingdom) Justin Sherwood	2014 Porsche Carrera Cup Great Britain
Porsche Carrera Cup Great Britain	Pro–Am2: (United Kingdom) Steven Liquorish	2014 Porsche Carrera Cup Great Britain
Porsche Carrera Cup France	(France) Côme Ledogar	
Porsche Carrera Cup France	Teams: (France) IMSA Performance Matmut	
Porsche Carrera Cup France	B–Class: (Belgium) Jean Glorieux	
Porsche Carrera Cup France	Juniors: (Switzerland) Jimmy Antunes	
Porsche Carrera Cup Japan	(Japan) Ryo Ogawa	
Porsche Carrera Cup Japan	Teams: (Japan) Team Ktouch Porsche	
Porsche Carrera Cup Japan	Gentleman: (Japan) Satoshi Hoshino	
Porsche Carrera Cup Australia	(New Zealand) Steven Richards	2014 Australian Carrera Cup Championship
Porsche Carrera Cup Australia	Elite Class: (Australia) Stephen Grove	2014 Australian Carrera Cup Championship
Porsche Carrera Cup Asia	(New Zealand) Earl Bamber	
Porsche Carrera Cup Asia	Class B: (Malaysia) Alif Hamdan	
Porsche Carrera Cup Scandinavia	(Sweden) Oscar Palm	
Porsche Carrera Cup Italy	(Italy) Matteo Cairoli	2014 Porsche Carrera Cup Italy
Porsche Carrera Cup Italy	Teams: (Italy) Antonelli Motorsport – Centro Porsche Padova	2014 Porsche Carrera Cup Italy
Porsche Carrera Cup Italy	Michelin Cup: (Italy) Alex De Giacomi	2014 Porsche Carrera Cup Italy
Lamborghini Super Trofeo
Lamborghini Super Trofeo Europe	Pro: (Serbia) Miloš Pavlović (Italy) Edoardo Piscopo	
Lamborghini Super Trofeo Europe	Pro-Am: (Italy) Alberto Di Folco	
Lamborghini Super Trofeo Europe	Am: (Italy) Simone Pellegrinelli	
Lamborghini Super Trofeo Europe	Pro Teams: (Italy) Bonaldi Motorsport	
Lamborghini Super Trofeo Europe	Pro-Am Teams: (Italy) Autocarrozzeria Imperiale S.R.L.	
Lamborghini Super Trofeo Europe	Am Teams: (Italy) DTMotorsport	
Lamborghini Super Trofeo North America	(United States) Kevin Conway	
Lamborghini Super Trofeo North America	Teams: (United States) Mitchum Motorsports	
Lamborghini Super Trofeo Asia	(Italy) Max Wiser	

== Stock car racing ==
Series	Champion(s)	refer
ARCA Racing Series	(United States) Mason Mitchell	2014 ARCA Racing Series
Stock Car Brasil	(Brazil) Rubens Barrichello	2014 Stock Car Brasil season
Stock Car Brasil	Teams: (Brazil) Full Time Sports	2014 Stock Car Brasil season
Campeonato Brasileiro de Turismo	(Brazil) Guilherme Salas	2014 Campeonato Brasileiro de Turismo season
Turismo Carretera	(Argentina) Matías Rossi	
NASCAR
NASCAR Sprint Cup Series	(United States) Kevin Harvick	2014 NASCAR Sprint Cup Series
NASCAR Sprint Cup Series	Manufacturers: (United States) Chevrolet	2014 NASCAR Sprint Cup Series
NASCAR Nationwide Series	(United States) Chase Elliott	2014 NASCAR Nationwide Series
NASCAR Nationwide Series	Manufacturers: (United States) Chevrolet	2014 NASCAR Nationwide Series
NASCAR Camping World Truck Series	(United States) Matt Crafton	2014 NASCAR Camping World Truck Series
NASCAR Camping World Truck Series	Manufacturers: (Japan) Toyota	2014 NASCAR Camping World Truck Series
NASCAR Canadian Tire Series	(Canada) Louis-Philippe Dumoulin	2014 NASCAR Canadian Tire Series
NASCAR Canadian Tire Series	Manufacturers: (United States) Dodge	2014 NASCAR Canadian Tire Series
NASCAR K&N Pro Series East	(United States) Ben Rhodes	2014 NASCAR K&N Pro Series East
NASCAR K&N Pro Series West	(United States) Greg Pursley	2014 NASCAR K&N Pro Series West
NASCAR Toyota Series	(Mexico) Abraham Calderón	2014 NASCAR Toyota Series
NASCAR Whelen Modified Tour	(United States) Doug Coby III	2014 NASCAR Whelen Modified Tour
NASCAR Whelen Southern Modified Tour	(United States) Andy Seuss	2014 NASCAR Whelen Southern Modified Tour
Whelen Euroseries	(Belgium) Anthony Kumpen	2014 NASCAR Whelen Euro Series
Whelen Euroseries	Teams: (Belgium) PK Carsport	2014 NASCAR Whelen Euro Series
Whelen Euroseries	Division II: (Belgium) Maxime Dumarey	2014 NASCAR Whelen Euro Series
Whelen All-American Series	(United States) Anthony Anders	

== Touring car racing ==
Series	Champion	refer
World Touring Car Championship	(Argentina) José María López	2014 World Touring Car Championship
World Touring Car Championship	Manufacturers: (France) Citroën	2014 World Touring Car Championship
World Touring Car Championship	Trophy: (Germany) Franz Engstler	2014 World Touring Car Championship
World Touring Car Championship	Trophy Teams: (Italy) ROAL Motorsport	2014 World Touring Car Championship
Deutsche Tourenwagen Masters	(Germany) Marco Wittmann	2014 Deutsche Tourenwagen Masters
Deutsche Tourenwagen Masters	Teams: (Germany) BMW Team RMG	2014 Deutsche Tourenwagen Masters
Deutsche Tourenwagen Masters	Manufacturers: (Germany) Audi	2014 Deutsche Tourenwagen Masters
European Touring Car Cup	TC2 Turbo: (Russia) Nikolay Karamyshev	2014 European Touring Car Cup season
European Touring Car Cup	TC2: (Czech Republic) Petr Fulín	2014 European Touring Car Cup season
European Touring Car Cup	Super 1600: (Luxembourg) Gilles Bruckner	2014 European Touring Car Cup season
European Touring Car Cup	Single-makes: (Russia) Dmitry Bragin	2014 European Touring Car Cup season
Brasileiro de Marcas	(Brazil) Ricardo Maurício	2014 Brasileiro de Marcas
Brasileiro de Marcas	Teams: (Brazil) JML Racing	2014 Brasileiro de Marcas
Brasileiro de Marcas	Manufacturers: (Japan) Toyota	2014 Brasileiro de Marcas
British Touring Car Championship	(United Kingdom) Colin Turkington	2014 British Touring Car Championship season
British Touring Car Championship	Manufacturers: (United Kingdom) MG / Triple Eight	2014 British Touring Car Championship season
British Touring Car Championship	Teams: (United Kingdom) eBay Racing	2014 British Touring Car Championship season
British Touring Car Championship	Jack Sears Trophy: (United Kingdom) Dave Newsham	2014 British Touring Car Championship season
New Zealand V8 Championship	TLX: (New Zealand) Nick Ross	2013–14 New Zealand V8 season
New Zealand V8 Championship	TL: (New Zealand) James McLaughlin	2013–14 New Zealand V8 season
V8 Supercars Championship	(Australia) Jamie Whincup	2014 International V8 Supercars Championship
V8 Supercars Championship	Teams: (Australia) Triple Eight Race Engineering	2014 International V8 Supercars Championship
V8 Supercars Championship	Manufacturers: (Australia) Holden	2014 International V8 Supercars Championship
V8 Supercars Championship	Endurance Cup: (Australia) Jamie Whincup; Endurance Cup: (Australia) Paul Dumbrell	2014 International V8 Supercars Championship
Dunlop V8 Supercar Series	(Australia) Paul Dumbrell	2014 Dunlop V8 Supercar Series
V8SuperTourers	(New Zealand) Greg Murphy	2014 V8SuperTourer season
V8SuperTourers	Teams: (New Zealand) M3 Racing	2014 V8SuperTourer season
V8SuperTourers	Sprint: (New Zealand) Greg Murphy	2014 V8SuperTourer season
Súper Turismo Competición 2000	(Argentina) Néstor Girolami	
Súper Turismo Competición 2000	Teams: (Argentina) Peugeot Lo Jack Team	
Súper Turismo Competición 2000	Manufacturers: (France) Peugeot	
Turismo Competición 2000	(Argentina) Facundo Della Motta	
Turismo Competición 2000	Teams: (Argentina) RAM Racing	
Turismo Competición 2000	Manufacturers: (United States) Ford	
Australian Saloon Car Series	(Australia) Gavin Ross	2014 Australian Saloon Car Series
Australian Suzuki Swift Series	(Australia) Gus Robbins	2014 Australian Suzuki Swift Series
EuroV8 Series	(Italy) Francesco Sini	2014 EuroV8 Series season
EuroV8 Series	Under 25: (Italy) Eddie Cheever III	2014 EuroV8 Series season
EuroV8 Series	Gentleman: (Italy) Ermanno Dionisio	2014 EuroV8 Series season
EuroV8 Series	Teams: (Italy) Audi Sport Italia	2014 EuroV8 Series season
Danish Thundersport Championship	(Denmark) Casper Elgaard	
Danish Thundersport Championship	Teams: (Denmark) STARK Racing	
Danish Thundersport Championship	NEZ: (Denmark) Ronnie Bremer	
Danish Thundersport Championship	NTCC: (Norway) Marius Nakken	
Danish Thundersport Championship	Rookie: (Denmark) Jesper Egebart	
Danish Thundersport Championship	Under 21: (Norway) Marius Nakken	
ADAC Procar Series	Division 1: (Germany) Heiko Hammel	2014 ADAC Procar Series season
ADAC Procar Series	Division 2: (Germany) Alexander Rambow	2014 ADAC Procar Series season
ADAC Procar Series	Division 3: (Germany) Steve Kirsch	2014 ADAC Procar Series season
Volkswagen Scirocco R-Cup	(South Africa) Jordan Pepper	2014 Volkswagen Scirocco R-Cup season
Renault Clio Cup
Eurocup Clio	(Spain) Oscar Nogués	2014 Eurocup Clio season
Clio Cup United Kingdom	(United Kingdom) Mike Bushell	2014 Renault Clio Cup United Kingdom season
Clio Cup China Series	(South Africa) Naomi Schiff	2014 Clio Cup China Series season
SEAT León Supercopa
SEAT León Eurocup	(Spain) Pol Rosell	2014 SEAT León Eurocup season

== Truck racing ==
Series	Driver	Season article
European Truck Racing Championship	(Hungary) Norbert Kiss	2014 European Truck Racing Championship
European Truck Racing Championship	Teams: (Germany) Truck Sport Lutz Bernau	2014 European Truck Racing Championship
Fórmula Truck	(Brazil) Leandro Totti	2014 Fórmula Truck season
Fórmula Truck	Teams: (Brazil) RM Competições	2014 Fórmula Truck season
Fórmula Truck	Manufacturers: (Germany) MAN	2014 Fórmula Truck season
Fórmula Truck	South American: (Brazil) Leandro Totti	2014 Fórmula Truck season
Fórmula Truck	South American Manufacturers: (Germany) MAN	2014 Fórmula Truck season
MW-V6 Pickup Series	(Netherlands) Danny van Dongen	2014 MW-V6 Pickup Series
V8 Ute Racing Series	(Australia) Kris Walton	2014 V8 Ute Racing Series

== See also ==
- List of motorsport championships
