= 2016 NACAM Rally Championship =

Seasons
- ← 2015 2017 →

The 2016 NACAM Rally Championship was the ninth season of the NACAM Rally Championship. This championship was the FIA regional rally championship for the North America and Central America (NACAM) region. The season began 8 April in Oaxaca, Mexico, and ended 22 October in Costa Rica, after five events.

Rallies in Panama and Jamaica were dropped from the championship in favour of a second event in Costa Rica, the Rally La Ponderosa and for the first time, a rally in Canada, the Rallye Baie-des-Chaleurs in New Richmond, Quebec. Apart from this new event, the other four rallies were single day events.

Defending champion Ricardo Triviño won his seventh NACAM championship. Triviño won the first four events of the series. Season-long rival Francisco Name Jr. was second in those same events and won the final rally of the year but was still 24 points behind Triviño. They were the only two drivers to pursue the entire championship. Third in the championship, Miguel Medina drove only the first two events in Mexico finishing third in both.

== Event calendar and results ==
The 2016 NACAM Rally Championship was as follows:

Round	Rally name	Podium finishers				Statistics			
Round	Rally name	Rank	Driver	Car	Time	Stages	Length	Starters	Finishers
1	(Mexico) Rally Montañas Sierra Fria Aguascalientes (8–9 April)	1	(Mexico) Ricardo Triviño	Citroën DS3 R5	1:00:11.8	8	108.30 km	23	16
1	(Mexico) Rally Montañas Sierra Fria Aguascalientes (8–9 April)	2	(Mexico) Emilio Velázquez	Mitsubishi Lancer Evolution IX	1:00:59.8	8	108.30 km	23	16
1	(Mexico) Rally Montañas Sierra Fria Aguascalientes (8–9 April)	3	(Mexico) Francisco Name Jr.	Citroën DS3 R3T	1:01:37.3	8	108.30 km	23	16
2	(Mexico) RAC 1000 Rally (6–7 May)	1	(Mexico) Ricardo Triviño	Mitsubishi Lancer Evolution X	1:10:32.4	8	104.06 km	24	16
2	(Mexico) RAC 1000 Rally (6–7 May)	2	(Mexico) Benito Guerra jr.	Mitsubishi Lancer Evolution X	1:12:05.8	8	104.06 km	24	16
2	(Mexico) RAC 1000 Rally (6–7 May)	3	(Mexico) Francisco Name Jr.	Mitsubishi Lancer Evolution IX	1:13:02.4	8	104.06 km	24	16
3	(Canada) Rallye Baie-des-Chaleurs (1–3 July)	1	(Canada) Joël Levac	Mini John Cooper Works WRC	2:09:59.5	14	197.87 km	34	22
3	(Canada) Rallye Baie-des-Chaleurs (1–3 July)	2	(Canada) André Leblanc	Subaru Impreza WRX STi	2:11:31.8	14	197.87 km	34	22
3	(Canada) Rallye Baie-des-Chaleurs (1–3 July)	3	(Canada) Maxime Labrie	Subaru Impreza WRX STi	2:13:45.1	14	197.87 km	34	22
4	(Costa Rica) Rally Costa del Pacifico (27 August)	1	(Mexico) Ricardo Triviño	Mitsubishi Lancer Evolution X	1:06:21.2	8	96.80 km	9	8
4	(Costa Rica) Rally Costa del Pacifico (27 August)	2	(Mexico) Francisco Name Jr.	Mitsubishi Lancer Evolution IX	1:06:42.7	8	96.80 km	9	8
4	(Costa Rica) Rally Costa del Pacifico (27 August)	3	(Costa Rica) Gerardo Moreno	Peugeot 206	1:13:22.3	8	96.80 km	9	8
5	(Costa Rica) Rally La Ponderosa (22 October)	1	(Mexico) Francisco Name Jr.	Mitsubishi Lancer Evolution X	56:09.5	8	96.80 km	10	8
5	(Costa Rica) Rally La Ponderosa (22 October)	2	(Mexico) Ricardo Triviño	Mitsubishi Lancer Evolution X	56:46.2	8	96.80 km	10	8
5	(Costa Rica) Rally La Ponderosa (22 October)	3	(Colombia) Julián Jaramillo	Subaru Impreza STi N16	1:00:22.9	8	96.80 km	10	8

== Championship standings ==
The 2016 NACAM Rally Championship points are as follows:

Pos.	Driver	Vehicle	(Mexico) MON	(Mexico) 1000	(Canada) BdC	(Costa Rica) CdP	(Costa Rica) PON	Total
1	(Mexico) Ricardo Triviño	Citroën DS3 R5; Mitsubishi Lancer Evolution X	1	1	1	1	2	132
2	(Mexico) Francisco Name Jr.	Citroën DS3 R3T; Mitsubishi Lancer Evolution IX; Mitsubishi Lancer Evolution X	2	2	2	2	1	108
3	(Mexico) Miguel Medina	Ford Fiesta R2	3	3				32
4	(Costa Rica) Andrés Molina	Mitsubishi Lancer Evolution IX				3	4	28
5	(Colombia) Julián Jaramillo	Subaru Impreza STi N16					3	16
6	(Venezuela) Jose Alexander Gelvez	Mitsubishi Lancer Evolution IX	4					12

Key
Colour	Result
Gold	Winner
Silver	2nd place
Bronze	3rd place
Green	Points finish
Blue	Non-points finish
Blue	Non-classified finish (NC)
Purple	Did not finish (Ret)
Black	Excluded (EX)
Black	Disqualified (DSQ)
White	Did not start (DNS)
White	Cancelled (C)
Blank	Withdrew entry from the event (WD)
