= 2018 NACAM Rally Championship =

The 2018 NACAM Rally Championship was the eleventh season of the NACAM Rally Championship. This championship was the FIA regional rally championship for the North America and Central America (NACAM) region. The season began 8 March in Leon, Mexico, and ended 23 November in Colima, Mexico, after four events held in Canada and Mexico.

Venezuela's Rally Isla de Margarita was dropped without replacement from the calendar leaving only the mid-year Canadian Rallye Baie-des-Chaleurs event held outside of Mexico.

Defending champion, Citroën driver Ricardo Triviño won his ninth NACAM championship. Triviño won the first three rounds of the championship, wrapping the championship up after the mid-year trip to Canada. Fellow Mexican, Mitsubishi driver Ricardo Cordero Jr. finished second in the points after winning the season ending Rally Colima. Colombian Subaru driver Julián Jaramillo was third in the championship after good placings in the first two rallies of the championship.

== Event calendar and results ==
The 2018 NACAM Rally Championship was as follows:

Round	Rally name	Podium finishers				Statistics			
Round	Rally name	Rank	Driver	Car	Time	Stages	Length	Starters	Finishers
1	Rally Guanajuato Mexico (8–11 March)	1	(France) Sébastien Ogier	Ford Fiesta WRC	3:54:08.0	22	344.49 km	29	21
1	Rally Guanajuato Mexico (8–11 March)	2	(Spain) Dani Sordo	Hyundai i20 Coupe WRC	3:55:11.6	22	344.49 km	29	21
1	Rally Guanajuato Mexico (8–11 March)	3	(United Kingdom) Kris Meeke	Citroën C3 WRC	3:55:27.2	22	344.49 km	29	21
2	(Mexico) NACAM Rally Montañas (6–7 April)	1	(Mexico) Ricardo Triviño	Citroën DS3 R5	58:51.3	12	103.20 km	15	10
2	(Mexico) NACAM Rally Montañas (6–7 April)	2	(Mexico) Ricardo Cordero Jr.	Mitsubishi Lancer Evolution IX	1:00:04.2	12	103.20 km	15	10
2	(Mexico) NACAM Rally Montañas (6–7 April)	3	(Colombia) Julián Jaramillo	Subaru Impreza STi N16	1:04:08.1	12	103.20 km	15	10
3	(Canada) Rallye Baie-des-Chaleurs (29 June–1 July)	1	(Canada) Jean-Sébastien Besner	Mitsubishi Lancer Evolution VIII	2:32:48.3	18	247.71 km	30	21
3	(Canada) Rallye Baie-des-Chaleurs (29 June–1 July)	2	(Mexico) Ricardo Triviño	Citroën DS3 R5	2:34:17.2	18	247.71 km	30	21
3	(Canada) Rallye Baie-des-Chaleurs (29 June–1 July)	3	(Canada) Karel Carré	Subaru Impreza WRX STi	2:35:09.2	18	247.71 km	30	21
4	(Mexico) NACAM Rally Colima (22–23 November)	1	(Mexico) Ricardo Cordero Jr.	Mitsubishi Lancer Evolution IX	38:01.9	10	87.83 km	20	18
4	(Mexico) NACAM Rally Colima (22–23 November)	2	(Mexico) Guzzy Francisco Name	Mitsubishi Lancer Evolution IX	38:57.4	10	87.83 km	20	18
4	(Mexico) NACAM Rally Colima (22–23 November)	3	(Mexico) Carlos Salas Jr.	Mini Cooper S	39:44.8	10	87.83 km	20	18

== Championship standings ==
The 2018 NACAM Rally Championship points are as follows:

Pos.	Driver	Vehicle	(Mexico) MEX	(Mexico) MON	(Canada) BdC	(Mexico) COL	Total
1	(Mexico) Ricardo Triviño	Citroën DS3 R5	1	1	1	Ret	81
2	(Mexico) Ricardo Cordero Jr.	Mitsubishi Lancer Evolution X Mitsubishi Lancer Evolution IX	Ret	2	2	1	68
3	(Colombia) Julián Jaramillo	Subaru Impreza STi N16	4	3			31
4	(Canada) Jason Bailey	Ford Fiesta R2	5		4		25
5	(Lithuania) Deividas Jocius	Ford Fiesta R2	2				20
6	(Mexico) Óscar Uribe Balsa	Mitsubishi Lancer Evolution IX	3	Ret			17
6	(Mexico) Francisco Name Guzzy	Mitsubishi Lancer Evolution X	Ret		3		17

Key
Colour	Result
Gold	Winner
Silver	2nd place
Bronze	3rd place
Green	Points finish
Blue	Non-points finish
Blue	Non-classified finish (NC)
Purple	Did not finish (Ret)
Black	Excluded (EX)
Black	Disqualified (DSQ)
White	Did not start (DNS)
White	Cancelled (C)
Blank	Withdrew entry from the event (WD)
