= 2015 NACAM Rally Championship =

Seasons
- ← 2014 2016 →

The 2015 NACAM Rally Championship is the eighth season of the NACAM Rally Championship. This championship was the FIA regional rally championship for the North America and Central America (NACAM) region. The season began 13 April in Oaxaca, Mexico, and ended 27 November in Jamaica, after seven events.

The calendar has undergone a major change for 2015. Peru has been dropped as has 2014 cancelations, Guyana and Venezuela. Colombia, who stepped in to provide three championship events in 2014 after cancellations will not host an event in 2015. A second Mexican event, the RAC 1000 Rally, has been added as well as debutant host countries, Panama and the United States who plans to host the third round in the state of West Virginia.

== Event calendar and results ==
The 2015 NACAM Rally Championship was as follows:

Round	Rally name	Podium finishers				Statistics			
Round	Rally name	Rank	Driver	Car	Time	Stages	Length	Starters	Finishers
1	(Mexico) Rally Montañas Oaxaca (17–19 April)	1	(Mexico) Ricardo Triviño	Mitsubishi Lancer Evolution X	2:08:31.9	12	149.40 km	25	14
1	(Mexico) Rally Montañas Oaxaca (17–19 April)	2	(Mexico) Emilio Velázquez	Mitsubishi Lancer Evolution IX	2:08:40.2	12	149.40 km	25	14
1	(Mexico) Rally Montañas Oaxaca (17–19 April)	3	(Mexico) Miguel Medina	Ford Fiesta R2T	2:19:55.4	12	149.40 km	25	14
2	(Mexico) RAC 1000 Rally (29–31 May)	1	(Mexico) Ricardo Triviño	Mitsubishi Lancer Evolution X	1:07:05.2	11	113.72 km	20	17
2	(Mexico) RAC 1000 Rally (29–31 May)	2	(Mexico) Francisco Name Jr.	Mitsubishi Lancer Evolution IX	1:07:10.1	11	113.72 km	20	17
2	(Mexico) RAC 1000 Rally (29–31 May)	3	(Mexico) Emilio Velázquez	Mitsubishi Lancer Evolution IX	1:09:06.2	11	113.72 km	20	17
3	(Costa Rica) Rally Africa Safari (23–25 July)	1	(Costa Rica) José Andrés Montalto	Subaru Impreza WRX STi	1:11:56.8	13	106.29 km	15	10
3	(Costa Rica) Rally Africa Safari (23–25 July)	2	(Mexico) Ricardo Triviño	Mitsubishi Lancer Evolution X	1:13:00.2	13	106.29 km	15	10
3	(Costa Rica) Rally Africa Safari (23–25 July)	3	(Costa Rica) Andrés Montalto	Subaru Impreza WRX STi	1:14:22.7	13	106.29 km	15	10
	(United States) Rally West Virginia (24–26 July)	event cancelled							
	(Costa Rica) Rally Costa del Pacifico (3–5 September)	event replaced							
4	Rally Panama (4–5 September)	1	(United States) Dillon van Way	Ford Fiesta R2	0:51:11	8	122.76 km		
4	Rally Panama (4–5 September)	2	(Mexico) Miguel Medina	Ford Fiesta R2	0:52:33	8	122.76 km		
4	Rally Panama (4–5 September)	3	(Mexico) Ricardo Triviño	Mitsubishi Lancer Evolution X	0:56:16	8	122.76 km		
5	Rally Jamaica (27–29 November)	1	(Jamaica) Jeffrey Panton	Ford Focus WRC	1:44:33.0	24		25	17
5	Rally Jamaica (27–29 November)	2	(France) Simon Jean-Joseph	Ford Fiesta R5	1:47:10.5	24		25	17
5	Rally Jamaica (27–29 November)	3	(Jamaica) Joel Jackson	Subaru Impreza WRX STi	1:51:50.1	24		25	17

== Championship standings ==
The 2015 NACAM Rally Championship points are as follows:

Pos.	Driver	Vehicle	(Mexico) OAX	(Mexico) 1000	(Costa Rica) AFR	(Panama) PAN	(Jamaica) JAM	Total
1	(Mexico) Ricardo Triviño	Mitsubishi Lancer Evolution X	1	1	1	3	1	115
2	(Mexico) Miguel Medina	Ford Fiesta R2	2	3	Ret	2	4	63
3	(United States) Dillon van Way	Ford Fiesta R2	Ret	Ret	2	1	2	58
4	(Mexico) Francisco Name Jr.	Mitsubishi Lancer Evolution IX; Mitsubishi Lancer Evolution X	Ret	2	5	4	3	52
5	(Costa Rica) Andrés Molina	Ford Fiesta R2	3	5	3		5	50
6	(Mexico) Carlos Salas	Mitsubishi Lancer Evolution X		4				12
7	(Costa Rica) Kenneth González	Mitsubishi Lancer Evolution IX			4			4

Key
Colour	Result
Gold	Winner
Silver	2nd place
Bronze	3rd place
Green	Points finish
Blue	Non-points finish
Blue	Non-classified finish (NC)
Purple	Did not finish (Ret)
Black	Excluded (EX)
Black	Disqualified (DSQ)
White	Did not start (DNS)
White	Cancelled (C)
Blank	Withdrew entry from the event (WD)
