= 2013 NACAM Rally Championship =

2013 NACAM Rally season

Seasons
- ← 2012 2014 →

The 2013 NACAM Rally Championship is the sixth season of the NACAM Rally Championship. This Championship is the FIA regional rally championship for the North America and Central America (NACAM) region. The season began April 20 in Oaxaca, Mexico, and is scheduled to end November 24 in Jamaica, after six events.

Reigning champion Ricardo Triviño won his fourth NACAM championship, winning four of the six rallies, three of them outright. Trivino won by 21 points over Venezuelan driver Alejandro Lombardo. Costa Rican driver Andrés Molina won a season long battle with Mexican Carlos Izquierdo for third in the championship. Lombardo and Molina were the only drivers to take first place in NACAM points away from Triviño, having done so at the Peruvia Rally Cañete and the Costa Rican Rally Costa del Pacifico respectively.

== Race calendar and results ==
The 2013 NACAM Rally Championship is as follows:

| Round | Rally name | Podium finishers | | | | Statistics | | | |
| Round | Rally name | Rank | Driver | Car | Time | Stages | Length | Starters | Finishers |
|---|---|---|---|---|---|---|---|---|---|
| 1 | (Mexico) Rally Montañas Oaxaca (5–6 April) | 1 | (Mexico) Ricardo Triviño | Mitsubishi Lancer Evo X | 2:15:20.1 | | 158.20 km | 20 | 16 |
| 1 | (Mexico) Rally Montañas Oaxaca (5–6 April) | 2 | (Mexico) Carlos Izquierdo | Mitsubishi Lancer Evo IX | 2:20:39.5 | | 158.20 km | 20 | 16 |
| 1 | (Mexico) Rally Montañas Oaxaca (5–6 April) | 3 | (Mexico) Emilio Velázquez | Mitsubishi Lancer Evo IX | 2:21:23.6 | | 158.20 km | 20 | 16 |
| 2 | (Costa Rica) Rally Costa del Pacifico (17–18 May) | 1 | (Costa Rica) José Andrés Montalto | Subaru Impreza WRX STI | 41:37.1 | | 115.60 km | 15 | 12 |
| 2 | (Costa Rica) Rally Costa del Pacifico (17–18 May) | 2 | (Costa Rica) Andrés Montalto | Subaru Impreza WRX STI | 42:14.6 | | 115.60 km | 15 | 12 |
| 2 | (Costa Rica) Rally Costa del Pacifico (17–18 May) | 3 | (Costa Rica) Andrés Molina | Mitsubishi Lancer Evo IX | 44:18.8 | | 115.60 km | 15 | 12 |
| 3 | (Peru) Rally Cañete (19–21 July) | 1 | (Peru) Juan Abuid | Mitsubishi Lancer Evo IX | 1:23:16.0 | 9 | 134.00 km | 46 | 32 |
| 3 | (Peru) Rally Cañete (19–21 July) | 2 | (Peru) Jorge Martínez | Subaru Impreza WRX STI | 1:25:52.5 | 9 | 134.00 km | 46 | 32 |
| 3 | (Peru) Rally Cañete (19–21 July) | 3 | (Peru) Raul Velit | Suzuki SX4 | 1:26:31.3 | 9 | 134.00 km | 46 | 32 |
| 4 | (Colombia) Rally Picos del Sicuara (20–21 September) | 1 | (Mexico) Ricardo Triviño | Mitsubishi Lancer Evo X | | | | | |
| 4 | (Colombia) Rally Picos del Sicuara (20–21 September) | 2 | (Colombia) Carlos Garcia Fessman | Mitsubishi Lancer Evo X | | | | | |
| 4 | (Colombia) Rally Picos del Sicuara (20–21 September) | 3 | (Mexico) Carlos Izquierdo | Mitsubishi Lancer Evo IX | | | | | |
| 5 | (Venezuela) Rally Isla de Margarita (11–13 October) | 1 | (Mexico) Ricardo Triviño | Mitsubishi Lancer Evo X | 1:17:49.9 | 10 | 111.30 km | | |
| 5 | (Venezuela) Rally Isla de Margarita (11–13 October) | 2 | (Venezuela) Alejandro Lombardo | Mitsubishi Lancer Evo IX | 1:17:49.9 | 10 | 111.30 km | | |
| 5 | (Venezuela) Rally Isla de Margarita (11–13 October) | 3 | (Venezuela) Jose Alexander Gelvez | Mitsubishi Lancer Evo X | 1:22:30.8 | 10 | 111.30 km | | |
| 6 | Rally Jamaica (22–24 November) | 1 | (Jamaica) Jeffrey Panton | Ford Focus RS WRC | 1:26:19.5 | | | | |
| 6 | Rally Jamaica (22–24 November) | 2 | (Trinidad and Tobago) John Powell | Ford Fiesta RS WRC | 1:27:56.3 | | | | |
| 6 | Rally Jamaica (22–24 November) | 3 | (Barbados) Roger Skeete | Subaru Impreza WRC | 1:33:51.0 | | | | |

== Championship standings ==
The 2013 NACAM Rally Championship points are as follows:

| Position | Driver | Vehicle | (Mexico) OAX | (Costa Rica) CdP | (Peru) CAN | (Colombia) PdS | (Venezuela) IdM | (Jamaica) JAM | Total |
|---|---|---|---|---|---|---|---|---|---|
| 1 | (Mexico) Ricardo Triviño | Mitsubishi Lancer Evo X | 1 | 4 | 3 | 1 | 1 | 1 | 127 |
| 2 | (Venezuela) Alejandro Lombardo | Mitsubishi Lancer Evo IX | 3 | 2 | 1 | 4 | 2 | 2 | 106 |
| 3 | (Costa Rica) Andrés Molina | Mitsubishi Lancer Evo IX | | 1 | 4 | 5 | 4 | 4 | 71 |
| 4 | (Mexico) Carlos Izquierdo | Mitsubishi Lancer Evo IX | 2 | Ret | 2 | 3 | | 3 | 66 |
| 5 | (Colombia) Carlos Garcia Fessman | Mitsubishi Lancer Evo X | 4 | | 5 | 2 | | | 40 |
| 6 | (Mexico) Victor Peréz | Mitsubishi Lancer Evo VI | | 3 | | | | | 15 |
| 6 | (Venezuela) Jose Alexander Gelvez | Mitsubishi Lancer Evo X | | | | | 3 | | 15 |
| 8 | (Mexico) Jorge González | Mitsubishi Lancer ST | 5 | | | | | | 10 |
| 8 | (Venezuela) Edgar Valero | Ford Fiesta | | | | | 5 | | 10 |
| 10 | (Peru) José Luis Rocha | Škoda Fabia | | | | 6 | | | 8 |

Key
| Colour | Result |
|---|---|
| Gold | Winner |
| Silver | 2nd place |
| Bronze | 3rd place |
| Green | Points finish |
| Blue | Non-points finish |
| Blue | Non-classified finish (NC) |
| Purple | Did not finish (Ret) |
| Black | Excluded (EX) |
| Black | Disqualified (DSQ) |
| White | Did not start (DNS) |
| White | Cancelled (C) |
| Blank | Withdrew entry from the event (WD) |
