= 2011 NACAM Rally Championship =

Seasons
- ← 2010 2012 →

The 2011 NACAM Rally Championship was the 4th season of the FIA's NACAM Rally Championship. This Championship is the FIA rally championship for the North America and Central America region.

== Report ==
The season began in Mazamitla, Mexico. Raúl Orlandini took the first victory and took the first place in the championship. Orlandini won the first five special stage. Rubén Cuenca won the last, but only finished second. Orlandini won the second race in Puebla. Orlandini won four special stages, Luis Miguel Abascal won the fourth, and Víctor Pérez the fifth. Abascal finished in second place. The third round of NRC was carried out in Jacó, Costa Rica. The local driver José Andrés Montalto won the rally, but he was ineligible to NRC. The second place Orlandini took the points for first place. Nicolás Fuchs took the victory in the fourth rally, Rally Órganos. Rubén Cuenca finished in 2nd place in the rally. The Peruvian driver, Orlandini was proclaimed champion in this round.

== Drivers ==
Class N4
Team	Car	No.	Driver	Co-driver	Rounds
(Peru) Raul Orlandini	Mitsubishi Lancer Evo IX	202	(Peru) Raul Orlandini	(Peru) Diego Zuloaga	1–4
(Ecuador) Rubén Cuenca	Mitsubishi Lancer Evo IX	203	(Ecuador) Rubén Cuenca	(Ecuador) Daniel Galarza	1, 3–4
(Mexico) Name Racing	Mitsubishi Lancer Evo IX	204	(Mexico) Francisco Name	(Mexico) Armando Zapata	2
(Mexico) Rafael Boy	Mitsubishi Lancer Evo IX	205	(Mexico) Rafael Boy	(Mexico) Alex Domínguez	1

== Calendar ==
Round	Rally Name (Base)	Date
1	(Mexico) Rally de la Sierra del Tigre (Mazamitla)	April 1–3
2	(Mexico) 30° Rally Cañadas (Puebla)	May 13–15
3	(Costa Rica) Rally Costa del Pacífico (Jaco)	June 24–26
4	(Peru) Rally Órganos (Piura)	September 2–4
5	(Colombia) Rally Cartagena (Cartagena)	October 14–16

== Results and standings ==
=== Results ===
Round	Rally name	Podium finishers				Statistics			
Round	Rally name	Rank	Driver	Car	Time	Stages	Distance	Starters	Finishers
1	(Mexico) 3° Rally de la Sierra del Tigre (April 1–3)	1	(Peru) Raúl Orlandini	Mitsubishi Lancer Evo IX	1:22:19.9	6	120.56	26	14
1	(Mexico) 3° Rally de la Sierra del Tigre (April 1–3)	2	(Ecuador) Rubén Cuenca	Mitsubishi Lancer Evo IX	1:24:26.3	6	120.56	26	14
1	(Mexico) 3° Rally de la Sierra del Tigre (April 1–3)	3	(Mexico) Luis Miguel Abascal	Mitsubishi Lancer DE	1:36:52.9	6	120.56	26	14
2	(Mexico) 30° Rally Cañadas (May 13–15)	1	(Peru) Raúl Orlandini	Mitsubishi Lancer Evo IX	1:19:05.4	7	112.91 km	15	30
2	(Mexico) 30° Rally Cañadas (May 13–15)	2	(Mexico) Luis Miguel Abascal	Mitsubishi Lancer DE	1:23:24.1	7	112.91 km	15	30
2	(Mexico) 30° Rally Cañadas (May 13–15)	3	(Mexico) Omar Chávez	Peugeot 206 XS	1:34:08.8	7	112.91 km	15	30

=== Driver's Championship ===
Points are awarded to the top 10 classified finishers. The best 4 of a driver's results count towards the championship.

Position	1st	2nd	3rd	4th	5th	6th	7th	8th	9th	10th
Points	25	18	15	12	10	8	6	4	2	1

Rank	Driver	(Mexico) JAL	(Mexico) PUE	(Costa Rica) CRC	(Peru) PER	(Colombia) COL	Points
1	(Peru) Raúl Orlandini	1	1	1	2	Ret	93
2	(Ecuador) Rubén Cuenca	2		2	1		61
2	(Colombia) Nicolás Bedoya	Ret	Ret	3		1	40
3	(Mexico) Luis Miguel Abascal	3	2				33
4	(Mexico) Emilio Velázquez	4	5				22
5	(Mexico) Omar Chávez		3				15
7	(Mexico) Víctor Pérez	Ret	4	Ret			12
–	(Mexico) Francisco Name		Ret				0
–	(Mexico) Juan Carlos Sarmiento		Ret				0
–	(Mexico) Rafael Boy	Ret					0
