= 2017 NACAM Rally Championship =

The 2017 NACAM Rally Championship was the tenth season of the NACAM Rally Championship. This championship was the FIA regional rally championship for the North America and Central America (NACAM) region. The season began 9 March in Leon, Mexico, and ended 25 November in Colima, Mexico, after five events held in Canada and Venezuela.

Costa Rica's two events were dropped from the championship and replaced with events in Venezuela (Rally Isla de Margarita) and a new third rally in Mexico, the Rally Colima. The Mexican round of the World Rally Championship, Rally Guanajuato Mexico was included in place of the long running RAC 1000 Rally.

Defending champion, Citroën driver Ricardo Triviño won his eighth NACAM championship. Triviño won the second and third rounds of the championship, Rally Montañas Sierra Fría Aguascalientes in Aguascalientes, Mexico and Rallye Baie-des-Chaleurs in New Richmond, Canada and was second at the season opening event Rally Guanajuato Mexico. Triviño scored no further points, but had sufficient points to be well clear of all challengers. Mitsubishi driver Francisco Díaz Mendoza finished second in the points with two second places and only just over half the points scored by Triviño. Four drivers finished tied for third place.

== Event calendar and results ==
The 2017 NACAM Rally Championship was as follows:

| Round | Rally name | Podium finishers | | | | Statistics | | | |
| Round | Rally name | Rank | Driver | Car | Time | Stages | Length | Starters | Finishers |
|---|---|---|---|---|---|---|---|---|---|
| 1 | Rally Guanajuato Mexico (9–12 March) | 1 | (United Kingdom) Kris Meeke | Citroën C3 WRC | 3:22:04.6 | 19 | 370.46 km | 24 | 22 |
| 1 | Rally Guanajuato Mexico (9–12 March) | 2 | (France) Sébastien Ogier | Ford Fiesta WRC | 3:22:18.4 | 19 | 370.46 km | 24 | 22 |
| 1 | Rally Guanajuato Mexico (9–12 March) | 3 | (Belgium) Thierry Neuville | Hyundai i20 Coupe WRC | 3:23:04.3 | 19 | 370.46 km | 24 | 22 |
| 2 | (Mexico) Rally Montañas Sierra Fria Aguascalientes (8–9 April) | 1 | (Mexico) Ricardo Triviño | Mitsubishi Lancer Evolution X | 1:17:36.4 | 12 | 123.43 km | 17 | 9 |
| 2 | (Mexico) Rally Montañas Sierra Fria Aguascalientes (8–9 April) | 2 | (Mexico) Emilio Velázquez | Mitsubishi Lancer Evolution IX | 1:18:05.0 | 12 | 123.43 km | 17 | 9 |
| 2 | (Mexico) Rally Montañas Sierra Fria Aguascalientes (8–9 April) | 3 | (Mexico) Francisco Díaz Mendoza | Mitsubishi Lancer Evolution X | 1:01:37.3 | 12 | 123.43 km | 17 | 9 |
| 3 | (Canada) Rallye Baie-des-Chaleurs (30 June–2 July) | 1 | (Canada) Antoine L'Estage | Subaru WRX Sti | 2:07:14.0 | 14 | 211.06 km | 32 | 26 |
| 3 | (Canada) Rallye Baie-des-Chaleurs (30 June–2 July) | 2 | (Canada) Jean-Sébastien Besner | Mitsubishi Lancer Evolution VIII | 2:10:28.7 | 14 | 211.06 km | 32 | 26 |
| 3 | (Canada) Rallye Baie-des-Chaleurs (30 June–2 July) | 3 | (Canada) André Leblanc | Subaru Impreza WRX | 2:16:00.3 | 14 | 211.06 km | 32 | 26 |
| 4 | (Venezuela) Rally Isla de Margarita 2017 (3–5 November) | 1 | (Venezuela) Carlos Garcia Fessman | Mitsubishi Lancer Evolution X | 34:57 | 8 | 51.78 km | 8 | 7 |
| 4 | (Venezuela) Rally Isla de Margarita 2017 (3–5 November) | 2 | (Venezuela) Lino Oliveira | Citroën C4 VTS | 43:47 | 8 | 51.78 km | 8 | 7 |
| 4 | (Venezuela) Rally Isla de Margarita 2017 (3–5 November) | 3 | (Venezuela) Francisco Calderon | Hyundai Tiburon | 44:26 | 8 | 51.78 km | 8 | 7 |
| 5 | (Mexico) Rally Colima (24–25 November) | 1 | (Mexico) Ricardo Cordero Jr. | Mitsubishi Lancer Evolution IX | 51:20.0 | 19 | 98.85 km | 15 | 11 |
| 5 | (Mexico) Rally Colima (24–25 November) | 2 | (Mexico) Francisco Díaz Mendoza | Mitsubishi Lancer Evolution X | 51:28.3 | 19 | 98.85 km | 15 | 11 |
| 5 | (Mexico) Rally Colima (24–25 November) | 3 | (Mexico) Luis Manuela Garcia Torres | Mitsubishi Lancer Evolution IX | 51:52.4 | 19 | 98.85 km | 15 | 11 |

== Championship standings ==
The 2017 NACAM Rally Championship points are as follows:

| Pos. | Driver | Vehicle | (Mexico) MEX | (Mexico) MON | (Canada) BdC | (Venezuela) IdM | (Mexico) COL | Total |
|---|---|---|---|---|---|---|---|---|
| 1 | (Mexico) Ricardo Triviño | Citroën DS3 R5; Mitsubishi Lancer Evolution X | 2 | 1 | 1 | | Ret | 76 |
| 2 | (Mexico) Francisco Díaz Mendoza | Mitsubishi Lancer Evolution X | 7 | 2 | | | 2 | 40 |
| 3 | (Mexico) Ricardo Cordero Jr. | Mitsubishi Lancer Evolution IX | | 7 | | | 1 | 28 |
| 3 | (Venezuela) Carlos Garcia Fessman | Mitsubishi Lancer Evolution X | | | | 1 | | 28 |
| 3 | (Mexico) Benito Guerra Jr. | Škoda Fabia R5 | 1 | | | | | 28 |
| 3 | (United States) Dave Wallingford | Ford Fiesta R2T | 6 | | 2 | | | 28 |
| 7 | (Canada) Jason Bailey | Ford Fiesta R2 | 4 | | 3 | | | 27 |
| 8 | (Venezuela) David Sepeda | Fiat Uno | | | | 2 | | 20 |
| 9 | (Venezuela) Jose Labrador | Renault Clio | | | | 3 | | 15 |
| 9 | (Mexico) Francisco Name Jr. | Mitsubishi Lancer Evolution X Mitsubishi Lancer Evolution IX | 3 | Ret | | | | 15 |
| 11 | (Colombia) Julián Jaramillo | Subaru Impreza STi N16 | 5 | | | | | 11 |

Key
| Colour | Result |
|---|---|
| Gold | Winner |
| Silver | 2nd place |
| Bronze | 3rd place |
| Green | Points finish |
| Blue | Non-points finish |
| Blue | Non-classified finish (NC) |
| Purple | Did not finish (Ret) |
| Black | Excluded (EX) |
| Black | Disqualified (DSQ) |
| White | Did not start (DNS) |
| White | Cancelled (C) |
| Blank | Withdrew entry from the event (WD) |
