= 2011 Carrera Panamericana =

The 2011 edition of the Carrera Panamericana Mexican sports car racing event started in Huatulco, Oaxaca and finished in Zacatecas, Zacatecas. This edition was composed by 7 stages. The race started in October 21 and finished in October 27.

== Route ==
The 2011 edition traveled through eight states: started in Oaxaca and passed by, Puebla, Hidalgo, Querétaro, Michoacán, Guanajuato, Aguascalientes, and finished in Zacatecas.

== Participants ==
At least 75 drivers from México, USA, Canada, Sweden, Belgium and Germany took part in this edition. Douglas Mockett (2002 champion) raced in this edition. Ex-Formula one Jochen Mass raced this year in a Ford Mustang. Mexican drivers as Michel Jourdain Jr. (Champ Car, WRC) and Ricardo Triviño (WRC), eventual winner, also took part in this edition.

== Results ==
=== Overall ===
Pos.	Driver	Co-driver	Car	Category	Time
1	(Mexico) Ricardo Triviño	(Mexico) Marco Hernández	Studebaker	Turismo Mayor	4:27:39.1
2	(United States) Douglas Mockett	(Mexico) Angélica Fuentes	Oldsmobile	Turismo Mayor	+4.5
3	(France) Hilaire Damiron	(Mexico) Horacio Chousal Jr.	Buick	Turismo Mayor	+11:08.1
4	(Mexico) Ignacio Izaurieta	(Mexico) Raúl Villarreal	Ford	Historic C	+11:24.7
5	(Mexico) Carlos Castillo	(Mexico) Carlos Ramirez	Studebaker	Turismo Producción	+13:10.1

=== By Class ===
Category	Driver	Co-driver	Car	Time
Turismo Mayor	(Mexico) Ricardo Triviño	(Mexico) Marco Hernández	Studebaker	4:27:39.1
Turismo Producción	(Mexico) Carlos Castillo	(Mexico) Carlos Ramirez	Studebaker	4:40:50.0
Historic A	(Mexico) Emilio Velázquez	(Mexico) Liz Tejada	Volkswagen Beetle	5:19:50.7
Historic A+	(Mexico) Oscar Uribe	(Mexico) Alexis Uribe	Porsche	5:01:41.0
Historic B	(Mexico) Tomas López Rocha	(Mexico) Luis Vazquez	Porsche 911	4:58:21.5
Historic C	(Mexico) Ignacio Izaurieta	(Mexico) Raúl Villarreal	Ford	4:39:03.8
Original Panam	(United States) Carson Scheller	(United States) Lauren Sheller	Victoria	6:03:35.3
Sport Mayor	(United States) Russel Gee	(United States) Jim Pace	Jaguar	5:43:51.4
Sport Menor	(Mexico) Miguel Campero	(Mexico) Alejandra Campero	Porsche 356	5:09:58.2
Exhibition	(United States) John Groendyke	(United States) Charles Samples	Cadillac	5:02:24.2

== Stages ==
Day	Stage	Route	Driver	Co-Driver	Car	link
October 20	Preclassification	Huatulco	(Mexico) Ricardo Triviño	(Mexico) Marco Hernández	Studebaker	
October 21	Stage 1	Huatulco-Oaxaca de Juárez	(Mexico) Ricardo Triviño	(Mexico) Marco Hernández	Studebaker	
October 22	Stage 2	Oaxaca de Juárez-Puebla	(Mexico) Michel Jourdain Jr.	(Mexico) Miguel Angel Diez	Studebaker	
October 23	Stage 3	Puebla-Santiago de Querétaro	(Mexico) Michel Jourdain Jr.	(Mexico) Miguel Angel Diez	Studebaker	
October 24	Stage 4	Santiago de Querétaro-Morelia	(Mexico) Ricardo Triviño	(Mexico) Marco Hernández	Studebaker	
October 25	Stage 5	Morelia-Guanajuato	(Mexico) Ricardo Triviño	(Mexico) Marco Hernández	Studebaker	
October 26	Stage 6	Guanajuato-Aguascalientes	(United States) Douglas Mockett	(Mexico) Angélica Fuentes	Oldsmobile	
October 27	Stage 7	Aguascalientes-Zacatecas	(Mexico) Ricardo Triviño	(Mexico) Marco Hernández	Studebaker	

== By day ==
=== Day 0 ===
The preclassification consisted in a 30.2 km stage around Huatulco. There was a special stage of 8.12 km. The route took the Huatulco freeway to Salina Cruz and returned by Conejos beach. As this stage was optional, only 87 of 112 drivers took the start. There were four accidents, but no consequences.

Pos	Driver	Co-driver	Car	Category	Time	Speed
1	(Mexico) Ricardo Triviño	(Mexico) Marco Hernández	Studebaker	Turismo Mayor	3:49.0	119.948 K/H
2	(Mexico) Carlos Castillo	(Mexico) Carlos Ramirez	Studebaker	Turismo Produccion	+ 4.0	117.888 K/H
3	(Sweden) Mats Linden	(Sweden) Dan Hallstrom	Mustang	Historic C	+ 9.0	115.412 K/H
4	(France) Hilaire Damiron	(Mexico) Horacio Chousal Jr.	Buick	Turismo Mayor	+ 10.0	114.929 K/H
5	(United States) Douglas Mockett	(Mexico) Angélica Fuentes	Oldsmobile	Turismo Mayor	+10.0	114.929 K/H

=== Day 1 ===
The first stage began in Huatulco in direction to Oaxaca de Juárez. This stage passed by Salina Cruz, Santo Domingo Tehuantepec, Santa María Jalapa del Marqués, San Pedro Totolapa, Tlacolula de Matamoros. Competitors ran 401 km, 137 km in 10 special stages. The finish was in the Zocalo of Oaxaca.

Pos	Driver	Co-driver	Car	Category	Time	Speed
1	(Mexico) Ricardo Triviño	(Mexico) Marco Hernández	Studebaker	Turismo Mayor	55:25.7	141.294 K/H
2	(United States) Douglas Mockett	(Mexico) Angélica Fuentes	Oldsmobile	Turismo Mayor	+15.9	140.618 K/H
3	(Sweden) Mats Linden	(Sweden) Dan Hallstrom	Mustang	Historic C	+1:17.4	138.097 K/H
4	(Mexico) Gabriel Pérez	(Mexico) Ignacio Rodriguez	Studebaker	Turismo Produccion	+1:23.0	139.078 K/H
5	(Belgium) Raphael Van der Straten	(Belgium) Eric Werner	Buick	Turismo Mayor	+1:43.2	137.050 K/H

=== Day 2 ===
The second stage began in Oaxaca de Juárez and finished in Puebla. This day the Carrera pass only for Oaxaca and Puebla states. Huajuapan de León and Tehuacán were the main cities visited.

Pos	Driver	Co-driver	Car	Category	Time	Speed
1	(Mexico) Michel Jourdain Jr.	(Mexico) Miguel Ángel Diez	Studebaker	Turismo Mayor	44:12.9	130.363 K/H
2	(United States) Douglas Mockett	(Mexico) Angélica Fuentes	Oldsmobile	Turismo Mayor	+31.0	128.857 K/H
3	(Mexico) Gabriel Pérez	(Mexico) Ignacio Rodriguez	Studebaker	Turismo Produccion	+1:04.9	127.245 K/H
3	(Mexico) Jorge Espinosa	(Mexico) Gerardo Mendoza	Studebaker	Turismo Mayor	+1:12.7	126.872 K/H
5	(Belgium) Raphael Van der Straten	(Belgium) Eric Werner	Buick	Turismo Mayor	+1:20.4	126.457 K/H

=== Day 3 ===
The third stage began in Puebla and finished in Santiago de Querétaro. Ricardo Triviño finished the stage with the best time but received one minute of penalization.

Pos	Driver	Co-driver	Car	Category	Time	Speed
1	(Mexico) Michel Jourdain Jr.	(Mexico) Miguel Ángel Diez	Studebaker	Turismo Mayor	23:12.4	118.707 K/H
2	(United States) Douglas Mockett	(Mexico) Angélica Fuentes	Oldsmobile	Turismo Mayor	+36.4	115.633 K/H
3	(Mexico) Ignacio Izaurieta	(Mexico) Raúl Villarreal	Ford Hardtop	Historic C	+41.6	115.230 K/H
4	(Belgium) Raphael Van der Straten	(Belgium) Eric Werner	Buick	Turismo Mayor	+44.3	114.990 K/H
3	(Mexico) Ricardo Triviño	(Mexico) Marco Hernández	Studebaker	Turismo Mayor	+45.4	119.913 K/H

=== Day 4 ===
The second stage began in Santiago de Querétaro and finished in Morelia

Pos	Driver	Co-driver	Car	Category	Time	Speed
1	(Mexico) Ricardo Triviño	(Mexico) Marco Hernández	Studebaker	Turismo Mayor	25:08.9	135.674 K/H
2	(Mexico) Michel Jourdain Jr.	(Mexico) Miguel Ángel Diez	Studebaker	Turismo Mayor	+2.0	135.494 K/H
3	(Belgium) Raphael Van der Straten	(Belgium) Eric Werner	Buick	Turismo Mayor	+33.3	132.770 K/H
4	(United States) Douglas Mockett	(Mexico) Angélica Fuentes	Oldsmobile	Turismo Mayor	+43.1	131.915 K/H
5	(Mexico) Gabriel Pérez	(Mexico) Ignacio Rodriguez	Studebaker	Turismo Produccion	+48.5	131.491 K/H

=== Day 5 ===
The second stage began in Morelia and finished in Guanajuato

=== Day 6 ===
The second stage began in Guanajuato and finished in Aguascalientes

=== Day 7 ===
The second stage began in Aguascalientes and finished in Zacatecas
