= 2012 NACAM Rally Championship =

Automobile race

Seasons
- ← 2011 2013 →

The 2012 NACAM Rally Championship was the 5th season of the FIA's NACAM Rally Championship. This Championship is the FIA rally championship for the North America and Central America region. The season began April 20 in Puebla, Mexico, and ended November 18 in Cartagena, Colombia, after 6 events. Raúl Orlandini Griswold was at that date the reigning champion. Ricardo Triviño, 2009 champion, ran in the championship.

== Report ==
=== Round 1: Rally Cañadas ===
Ricardo Triviño took the first round in Puebla. Nicolás Bedoya not completed the first stage. Francisco Name also abandoned in after the third stage. Triviño won the first six stages making an advantage of 1:37.0 over John Powell. Powell won the last stage, but he only can recover 22.8 seconds. Triviño took the first place in the Driver's Championship.

Day	Stage	Time	Name	Length	Winner	Time	Avg. spd.	Rally leader
Leg 1 (April 21)	SS1	8:28	Tepenene-Huehuetlán 1	20.80 km	(Mexico) Ricardo Triviño	13:50.6	90.10 km/h	(Mexico) Ricardo Triviño
Leg 1 (April 21)	SS2	9:09	Huehuetlán-La Magdalena T. 1	12.98 km	(Mexico) Ricardo Triviño	8:29.3	91.80 km/h	(Mexico) Ricardo Triviño
Leg 1 (April 21)	SS3	9:34	La Magdalena T.-San Juan Atzompa 1	18.00 km	(Mexico) Ricardo Triviño	12:22.3	87.33 km/h	(Mexico) Ricardo Triviño
Leg 2 (April 21)	SS4	12:47	Tepenene-Huehuetlán 2	20.80 km	(Mexico) Ricardo Triviño	13:57.3	89.46 km/h	(Mexico) Ricardo Triviño
Leg 2 (April 21)	SS5	13:28	Huehuetlán-La Magdalena T. 2	12.98 km	(Mexico) Ricardo Triviño	8:28.5	91.98 km/h	(Mexico) Ricardo Triviño
Leg 2 (April 21)	SS6	13:53	La Magdalena T.-San Juan Atzompa 2	18.00 km	(Mexico) Ricardo Triviño	12:30.9	86.28 km/h	(Mexico) Ricardo Triviño
Leg 3 (April 21)	SS7	16:21	San Juan Atzompa-Huehuetlán	20.80 km	(Trinidad and Tobago) John Powell	18:52.7	91.50 km/h	(Mexico) Ricardo Triviño

=== Round 2: Rally Montañas ===
The second round in Oaxaca started with Carlos Izquierdo taking the lead. Powell, Landazuri and Fernández not finished the first stage. Triviño lost near 10 minutes in this stage. However, Triviño won the next 8 stages reaching the fourth place in the NACAM classification. In the special stage 10 Name had abandon, Name been in the second position. Izquierdo won the last 3 stages, and took the victory.

Day	Stage	Time	Name	Length	Winner	Time	Avg. spd.	Rally leader
Leg 1 (May 19)	SS1	8:08	Teotitlán 1	18.00 km	(Mexico) Carlos Izquierdo	15:50.1	68.21 km/h	(Mexico) Carlos Izquierdo
Leg 1 (May 19)	SS2	8:41	Benito Juárez A 1	10.10 km	(Mexico) Ricardo Triviño	8:03.4	75.28 km/h	(Mexico) Carlos Izquierdo
Leg 1 (May 19)	SS3	8:59	Latuvi A 1	12.00 km	(Mexico) Ricardo Triviño	8:11.2	87.98 km/h	(Mexico) Carlos Izquierdo
Leg 1 (May 19)	SS4	10:12	Reynoso 1	11.80 km	(Mexico) Ricardo Triviño	7:58.5	88.68 km/h	(Mexico) Carlos Izquierdo
Leg 1 (May 19)	SS5	10:31	Latuvi B 1	10.10 km	(Mexico) Ricardo Triviño	7:50.5	77.36 km/h	(Mexico) Carlos Izquierdo
Leg 1 (May 19)	SS6	10:49	Benito Juárez B 1	17.50 km	(Mexico) Ricardo Triviño	14:48.1	70.94 km/h	(Mexico) Carlos Izquierdo
Leg 2 (May 19)	SS7	12:37	Teotitlán 2	18.00 km	(Mexico) Ricardo Triviño	15:25.0	70.05 km/h	(Mexico) Carlos Izquierdo
Leg 2 (May 19)	SS8	13:10	Benito Juárez A 2	10.10 km	(Mexico) Ricardo Triviño	8:01.3	75.93 km/h	(Mexico) Carlos Izquierdo
Leg 2 (May 19)	SS9	13:28	Latuvi A 2	12.00 km	(Mexico) Ricardo Triviño	8:18.1	86.74 km/h	(Mexico) Carlos Izquierdo
Leg 2 (May 19)	SS10	14:41	Reynoso 2	11.80 km	(Mexico) Carlos Izquierdo	8:26.7	83.78 km/h	(Mexico) Carlos Izquierdo
Leg 2 (May 19)	SS11	15:00	Latuvi B 2	10.10 km	(Mexico) Carlos Izquierdo	8:21.4	72.57 km/h	(Mexico) Carlos Izquierdo
Leg 2 (May 19)	SS12	15:18	Benito Juárez B 2	17.50 km	(Mexico) Carlos Izquierdo	15:48.2	66.45 km/h	(Mexico) Carlos Izquierdo

=== Round 3: Rally Costa del Pacífico ===
Day	Stage	Time	Name	Length	Winner	Time	Avg. spd.	Rally leader
Leg 1 (July 7)	SS1	8:23	Curubande 1	21.20 km	(Trinidad and Tobago) John Powell	9:46.2		(Trinidad and Tobago) John Powell
Leg 1 (July 7)	SS2	9:11	Curubande 2	21.20 km	(Trinidad and Tobago) John Powell	9:36.2		(Trinidad and Tobago) John Powell
Leg 2 (July 7)	SS3	10:49	Curubande Invertido 1	21.20 km	(Trinidad and Tobago) John Powell	6:21.4		(Trinidad and Tobago) John Powell
Leg 2 (July 7)	SS4	10:37	Curubande Invertido 2	21.20 km	(Mexico) Ricardo Triviño	6:16.6		(Mexico) Ricardo Triviño
Leg 3 (July 7)	SS5	13:10	Cañas Dulces 1	12.90 km	(Mexico) Ricardo Triviño			(Mexico) Ricardo Triviño
Leg 3 (July 7)	SS6	13:58	Cañas Dulces 2	12.90 km	(Trinidad and Tobago) John Powell			(Mexico) Ricardo Triviño
Leg 4 (July 7)	SS7	15:41	Cañas Dulces Invertido 1	12.90 km	(Mexico) Ricardo Triviño			(Mexico) Ricardo Triviño
Leg 4 (July 7)	SS8	16:29	Cañas Dulces Invertido 2	12.90 km	(Mexico) Ricardo Triviño			(Mexico) Ricardo Triviño

== Calendar ==
The original calendar had six rallies, two of them in Mexico. Panama was originally included as the venue of the fifth round, however, on March 7 this round was changed to Ecuador.

Round	Rally Name (Base)	Date
1	(Mexico) 31° Rally Cañadas (Puebla)	April 20–22
2	(Mexico) Rally Montañas (Oaxaca)	May 18–20
3	(Costa Rica) Rally Costa de Pacífico (Liberia)	July 6–8
4	(Peru) Rally Cusco (Cusco)	August 30 – September 2
5	Rally Ecuador (Ecuador)	October 12–14
6	Rally Colombia (Cartagena)	November 16–18

== Teams and drivers ==
Class 3
Team	Car	No.	Driver	Co-driver	Rounds
(Mexico) Triviño WRT	Mitsubishi Lancer Evo IX	202	(Mexico) Ricardo Triviño	(Mexico) Marco Hernández	1–2
(Trinidad and Tobago) John Powell	Mitsubishi Lancer Evo IX	203	(Trinidad and Tobago) John Powell	(Jamaica) Michael Fennell	1–2
(Mexico) Name Racing	Mitsubishi Lancer Evo IX	204	(Mexico) Francisco Name	(Mexico) Armando Zapata	1–2
(Colombia) Colombian Motorsports	Subaru Impreza	205	(Colombia) Nikolas Bedoya	(Colombia) Ricardo Abello	1
(Mexico) Riviera Maya Rally Team	Mitsubishi Lancer Evo IX	206	(Mexico) Carlos Izquierdo	(Mexico) Guillermo Izquierdo	1–2
(Mexico) David Jassan	Mitsubishi Lancer Evo IX	208	(Mexico) David Jassan	(Mexico) Rafael Maggio	2
Class 8
(Peru) Dyer Racing Team	SEAT León	210	(Peru) Yazmín Dyer	(Peru) Julio Echazú	TBA
X Rally Ecuador	Mitsubishi Lancer DE	211	(Ecuador) Diego Landazuri	(Ecuador) Adolfo Espinosa	1–2
Rally Team Venezuela	Mitsubishi Lancer DE	212	(Venezuela) Alejandro Lombardo	(Venezuela) Miguel Alvarado	1–2
(Mexico) VP Garage	Mitsubishi Lancer DE	213	(Mexico) Luis Miguel Abascal	(Mexico) Jaime Marín	1
(Mexico) VP Garage	Mitsubishi Lancer DE	216	(Mexico) Víctor Pérez	(Mexico) Eduardo Espinosa	2
(Mexico) Mario Fernández	Renault Clio RS	214	(Mexico) Mario Fernández	(Mexico) Eduardo Solís	1–2
(Costa Rica) Molina Rally Team	Kia Cerato; Mitsubishi Lancer DE	218	(Costa Rica) Andrés Molina	(Costa Rica) Eduardo Corrales	2
Class 6
(Panama) Pandeportes Rally Team	Peugeot 206 XS	220	(Panama) Dante Pescetto	(Panama) Alejandro Domínguez	1–2
(Ecuador) Zhumir Rally Team	Peugeot 206 XS	221	(Ecuador) Diego Serrano	(Ecuador) Felipe Serrano	TBA
(Ecuador) Zhumir Rally Team	Peugeot 206 XS	222	(Ecuador) Isabel Serrano	(Ecuador) Juan Serrano	TBA
(Peru) Big Cola Rally Team	Peugeot 206 XS	223	(Peru) Pier Gozzer	(Mexico) Christian Franz	TBA

== Results and standings ==
=== Results ===
Round	Rally name	Podium finishers				Statistics			
Round	Rally name	Rank	Driver	Car	Time	Stages	Distance	Starters	Finishers
1	(Mexico) 31° Rally Cañadas (April 20–22)	1	(Mexico) Ricardo Triviño	Mitsubishi Lancer Evo IX	1:28:54.4	7	132.36 km	24	37
1	(Mexico) 31° Rally Cañadas (April 20–22)	2	(Trinidad and Tobago) John Powell	Mitsubishi Lancer Evo IX	1:30:08.6	7	132.36 km	24	37
1	(Mexico) 31° Rally Cañadas (April 20–22)	3	(Mexico) Carlos Izquierdo	Mitsubishi Lancer Evo IX	1:34:08.8	7	132.36 km	24	37
2	(Mexico) Rally Montañas Oaxaca (May 18–20)	1	(Mexico) Carlos Izquierdo	Mitsubishi Lancer Evo IX	2:09:06.3	12	137.10 km	16	23
2	(Mexico) Rally Montañas Oaxaca (May 18–20)	2	(Mexico) Ricardo Triviño	Mitsubishi Lancer Evo IX	2:19:35.6	12	137.10 km	16	23
2	(Mexico) Rally Montañas Oaxaca (May 18–20)	3	(Costa Rica) Andrés Molina	Mitsubishi Lancer DE	2:23:44.8	12	137.10 km	16	23
3	Rally Costa Rica (July 6–8)	1	(Mexico) Ricardo Triviño	Mitsubishi Lancer Evo IX	1:04:07.2	8	138.85 km	14	16
3	Rally Costa Rica (July 6–8)	2	(Trinidad and Tobago) John Powell	Mitsubishi Lancer Evo IX	1:10:11.0	8	138.85 km	14	16
3	Rally Costa Rica (July 6–8)	3	(Costa Rica) Andrés Molina	Mitsubishi Lancer DE	1:10:46.1	8	138.85 km	14	16
4	(Peru) Rally Cusco (August 30 – September 2)	1	(Mexico) Ricardo Triviño	Mitsubishi Lancer Evo IX	1:15:53.7		112.20 km		
4	(Peru) Rally Cusco (August 30 – September 2)	2	(Mexico) Carlos Izquierdo	Mitsubishi Lancer Evo IX	1:18:12.9		112.20 km		
4	(Peru) Rally Cusco (August 30 – September 2)	3	(Trinidad and Tobago) John Powell	Mitsubishi Lancer Evo IX	1:23:46.2		112.20 km		
5	(Colombia) Rally La Leyenda de Eldorado #1 (November 15–16)	1	(Mexico) Carlos Izquierdo	Mitsubishi Lancer Evo IX	1:23:04		108.18 km		
5	(Colombia) Rally La Leyenda de Eldorado #1 (November 15–16)	2	(Mexico) Ricardo Triviño	Mitsubishi Lancer Evo IX	1:23:04		108.18 km		
5	(Colombia) Rally La Leyenda de Eldorado #1 (November 15–16)	3	(Costa Rica) Andrés Molina	Mitsubishi Lancer DE	1:33:57		108.18 km		
6	(Colombia) Rally La Leyenda de Eldorado #2 (November 17–18)	1	(Mexico) Ricardo Triviño	Mitsubishi Lancer Evo IX	1:26:41		126.69 km		
6	(Colombia) Rally La Leyenda de Eldorado #2 (November 17–18)	2	(Mexico) Carlos Izquierdo	Mitsubishi Lancer Evo IX	1:30:22		126.69 km		
6	(Colombia) Rally La Leyenda de Eldorado #2 (November 17–18)	3	(Venezuela) Alejandro Lombardo	Mitsubishi Lancer DE	1:45:55		126.69 km		

=== Driver's Championship ===
Points are awarded to the top 10 classified finishers. The best 5 of a driver's results count towards the championship.

Position	1st	2nd	3rd	4th	5th	6th	7th	8th	9th	10th
Points	25	18	15	12	10	8	6	4	2	1

Rank	Driver	(Mexico) PUE	(Mexico) OAX	(Costa Rica) CRC	(Peru) PER	(Colombia) COL		Points
1	(Mexico) Ricardo Triviño	1	2	1	1	2	1	136
2	(Mexico) Carlos Izquierdo	3	1		2	1	2	101
3	(Costa Rica) Andrés Molina		4	3	4	3	Ret	54
4	(Trinidad and Tobago) John Powell	2	Ret	2	3			51
4	(Venezuela) Alejandro Lombardo	7	5	4	6	Ret	3	51
6	(Mexico) Mario Fernández	6	Ret	Ret	5	4	4	42
6	(Panama) Dante Pescetto	Ret	7	5	7	5	5	42
8	(Mexico) Víctor Pérez		3					15
9	(Ecuador) Diego Landazuri	4	Ret					12
10	(Mexico) Luis Miguel Abascal	7						10
11	(Mexico) David Jassan		6					8
Rank	Driver	(Mexico) PUE	(Mexico) OAX	(Costa Rica) CRC	(Peru) PER	(Colombia) COL		Points

Key
Colour	Result
Gold	Winner
Silver	2nd place
Bronze	3rd place
Green	Points finish
Blue	Non-points finish
Blue	Non-classified finish (NC)
Purple	Did not finish (Ret)
Black	Excluded (EX)
Black	Disqualified (DSQ)
White	Did not start (DNS)
White	Cancelled (C)
Blank	Withdrew entry from the event (WD)

=== Nations Cup ===
Points indicated rather than rally position.

Rank	Nation	(Mexico) PUE	(Mexico) OAX	(Costa Rica) CRC	(Peru) PER	(Colombia) COL		Points
1	Mexico	58	66	25	53	55	55	312
2	Costa Rica		12	15	12	15	0	54
3	Trinidad and Tobago	18	0	18	15			51
3	Venezuela	6	10	12	8	0	15	51
5	Panama	0	6	10	6	10	10	42
6	Ecuador	15	0					15
Rank	Nation	(Mexico) PUE	(Mexico) OAX	(Costa Rica) CRC	(Peru) PER	(Colombia) COL		Points
