= 2014 NACAM Rally Championship =

International rally competition

2014 NACAM Rally season

Seasons
- ← 2013 2015 →

The 2014 NACAM Rally Championship was the seventh season of the NACAM Rally Championship. This championship was the FIA regional rally championship for the North America and Central America (NACAM) region. The season began 28 March 2014 in Oaxaca, Mexico, and ended 23 November 2014 in Jamaica, after seven events. Mid-season events, the Venezuelan Rally Isla de Margarita and new rally Rally Guyana were removed from the calendar and replaced by two additional Colombian events, Rally Guane and Rally Volcan Peña Azul.

Reigning champion Ricardo Triviño of Mexico won his fifth championship after winning Rally Guane. Trivino won the Rally Costa del Pacifico as well as Rally Guane and was the leading championship-registered competitor in two other events and second in the remaining rally, giving him an unassailable 63-point lead with two rallies left in the calendar. Trivino won the Rally Volcan Peña Azul as well, and ultimately won the championship by 86 points ahead of Nicolas Bedoya. The only driver to defeat Triviño, Francisco Name Jr., finished third in the championship, two points adrift of Bedoya; he beat Dante Pescetto for the position on a tie-break. Rally Jamaica was not contested by any of the championship regulars, with the event won by Kyle Gregg.

== Event calendar and results ==
The 2014 NACAM Rally Championship was as follows:

Round	Rally name	Podium finishers				Statistics			
Round	Rally name	Rank	Driver	Car	Time	Stages	Length	Starters	Finishers
1	(Mexico) Rally Montañas Oaxaca (28–29 March)	1	(Mexico) Francisco Name Jr.	Mitsubishi Lancer Evo IX	2:14:29.8	14	161.80 km	20	14
1	(Mexico) Rally Montañas Oaxaca (28–29 March)	2	(Mexico) Ricardo Triviño	Mitsubishi Lancer Evo X	2:15:07.1	14	161.80 km	20	14
1	(Mexico) Rally Montañas Oaxaca (28–29 March)	3	(Mexico) Ricardo Cordero Jr.	Mitsubishi Lancer Evo X	2:16:08.2	14	161.80 km	20	14
2	(Costa Rica) Rally Costa del Pacifico (16–18 May)	1	(Mexico) Ricardo Triviño	Mitsubishi Lancer Evo X	1:10:24.2	12	102.60 km	15	8
2	(Costa Rica) Rally Costa del Pacifico (16–18 May)	2	(Costa Rica) Erick Bacherer	Mitsubishi Lancer Evo VI	1:11:32.6	12	102.60 km	15	8
2	(Costa Rica) Rally Costa del Pacifico (16–18 May)	3	(Costa Rica) Andrés Molina	Mitsubishi Lancer Evo IX	1:11:34.4	12	102.60 km	15	8
3	(Peru) Rally Cañete (6–7 June)	1	(Peru) Richard Palomino	Mitsubishi Lancer Evo IX	1:32:12.6			62	39
3	(Peru) Rally Cañete (6–7 June)	2	(Peru) Romel Palomino	Mitsubishi Lancer Evo IX	1:34:58.6			62	39
3	(Peru) Rally Cañete (6–7 June)	3	(Peru) Helberth Samalvides	Polaris RZR-XP	1:36:31.7			62	39
4	(Colombia) Rally Lago de Tota (1–2 August)	1	(Mexico) Francisco Name Jr.	Mitsubishi Lancer Evo X	1:04:03.5	8	92.70 km	20	13
4	(Colombia) Rally Lago de Tota (1–2 August)	2	(Colombia) Julián Jaramillo	Subaru Impreza WRX STi	1:06:11.6	8	92.70 km	20	13
4	(Colombia) Rally Lago de Tota (1–2 August)	3	(Mexico) Ricardo Triviño	Mitsubishi Lancer Evo X	1:08:26.0	8	92.70 km	20	13
	(Venezuela) Rally Isla de Margarita (5–6 September)	cancelled							
5	(Colombia) Rally Guane (5–6 September)	1	(Mexico) Ricardo Triviño	Mitsubishi Lancer Evo X	1:09:51.67	12		27	19
5	(Colombia) Rally Guane (5–6 September)	2	(Mexico) Francisco Name Jr.	Mitsubishi Lancer Evo X	1:10:19.42	12		27	19
5	(Colombia) Rally Guane (5–6 September)	3	(Colombia) Julián Jaramillo	Subaru Impreza WRX STi	1:14:58.60	12		27	19
6	(Colombia) Rally Volcan Peña Azul (3–4 October)	1	(Mexico) Ricardo Triviño	Mitsubishi Lancer Evo X					
6	(Colombia) Rally Volcan Peña Azul (3–4 October)	2	(Colombia) Julián Jaramillo	Subaru Impreza WRX STi					
6	(Colombia) Rally Volcan Peña Azul (3–4 October)	3	(Panama) Dante Pescetto	Škoda Fabia S2000					
	Rally Guyana (10–11 October)	cancelled							
7	Rally Jamaica (21–23 November)	1	(Jamaica) Kyle Gregg	Mitsubishi Lancer Evo IX	1:45:16	21		14	9
7	Rally Jamaica (21–23 November)	2	(Jamaica) Joel Jackson	Subaru Impreza WRX STi	1:45:30	21		14	9
7	Rally Jamaica (21–23 November)	3	(Jamaica) Jordan Powell	Honda Civic	1:51:35	21		14	9

== Championship standings ==
The 2014 NACAM Rally Championship points were as follows:

Pos.	Driver	Vehicle	(Mexico) OAX	(Costa Rica) CdP	(Peru) CAN	(Colombia) PdS	(Colombia) GUA	(Colombia) VPA	(Jamaica) JAM	Total
1	(Mexico) Ricardo Triviño	Mitsubishi Lancer Evo X	1	1	1	2	1	1		143
2	(Colombia) Nicolas Bedoya	Kia Koup		3		4	3	3		57
3	(Mexico) Francisco Name Jr.	Mitsubishi Lancer Evo IX		4	Ret	1	2			55
3	(Panama) Dante Pescetto	Škoda Fabia; Toyota Echo	3	Ret		5	4	2		55
5	(Costa Rica) Andrés Molina	Mitsubishi Lancer Evo IX	2	2		3	Ret			51

Key
Colour	Result
Gold	Winner
Silver	2nd place
Bronze	3rd place
Green	Points finish
Blue	Non-points finish
Blue	Non-classified finish (NC)
Purple	Did not finish (Ret)
Black	Excluded (EX)
Black	Disqualified (DSQ)
White	Did not start (DNS)
White	Cancelled (C)
Blank	Withdrew entry from the event (WD)
