= NACAM Rally Championship =

- Category: Groups Rally; Super 2000; Group N
- Country: Americas
- Inaugural season: 2008
- Drivers' champion: (Mexico) Ricardo Cordero
- Makes' champion: (France) Citroen C3 Rally 2
- Official website: rallynacam.com

The NACAM Rally Championship is an international rally championship which is run under the auspicies of FIA and held across North and Central America, northern South America and the Caribbean. The championship was established in 2008.

== History ==
While the NACAM region encompasses 14 countries the core of the championship is in Mexico and Costa Rica. Both have held rallies in every NACAM championship with Rally Costa del Pacífico in Costa Rica the only rally to have been held in every NACAM championship. The 2013 championship has events is Mexico, Costa Rica, Peru, Colombia with Venezuela and Trinidad and Tobago debuting in 2013. Rallies have previously been held in Guatemala, Barbados and Ecuador.

Mexican driver Ricardo Triviño is the only multiple champion, having won the series ten times since 2008. Results had been dominated by drivers of Group N Mitsubishi Lancers until Rally2 cars begun to be more widely used. Rally2 cars have won every rally since 2018.

== List of events ==
Sourced from:

- Rally Costa del Pacífico, Costa Rica (2008–16)
- Rally Guatemala (2008)
- Rally Barbados (2008)
- Rally Mexico (2008, 2017–19)
- Rally Sierra del Tigre, Mexico (2009–11)
- Rally Ecuador (2009, 2012)
- Rally Aguascalientes, Mexico (2010)
- Rally Abangaritos, Costa Rica (2010)
- Rally Rio Jimenez, Costa Rica (2010)
- Rally Cañadas, Mexico (2011–12)
- Rally Órganos, Peru (2011)
- Rally Cartagena, Colombia (2011–12)
- Rally Montañas, Mexico (2012–19)
- Rally Cusco, Peru (2012)
- Rally Picos del Sicuara, Colombia (2013–14)
- Rally Cañete, Peru (2013)
- Rally Venezuela (2013)
- Rally Trinidad (2013)
- Rally Guane, Colombia (2014)
- Rally Guyana (2014)
- RAC 1000 Rally, Mexico (2015–16)
- Rally Africa Safari, Costa Rica (2015)
- Rally Panama (2015)
- Rally Jamaica (2015)
- Rallye Baie-des-Chaleurs, Canada (2016–19)
- Rally La Ponderosa, Costa Rica (2016)
- Rally Isla de Margarita, Venezuela (2017–18)
- Rally Colima, Mexico (2017–19)
- Rally Sierra Juárez, Mexico (2019)

== Champions ==
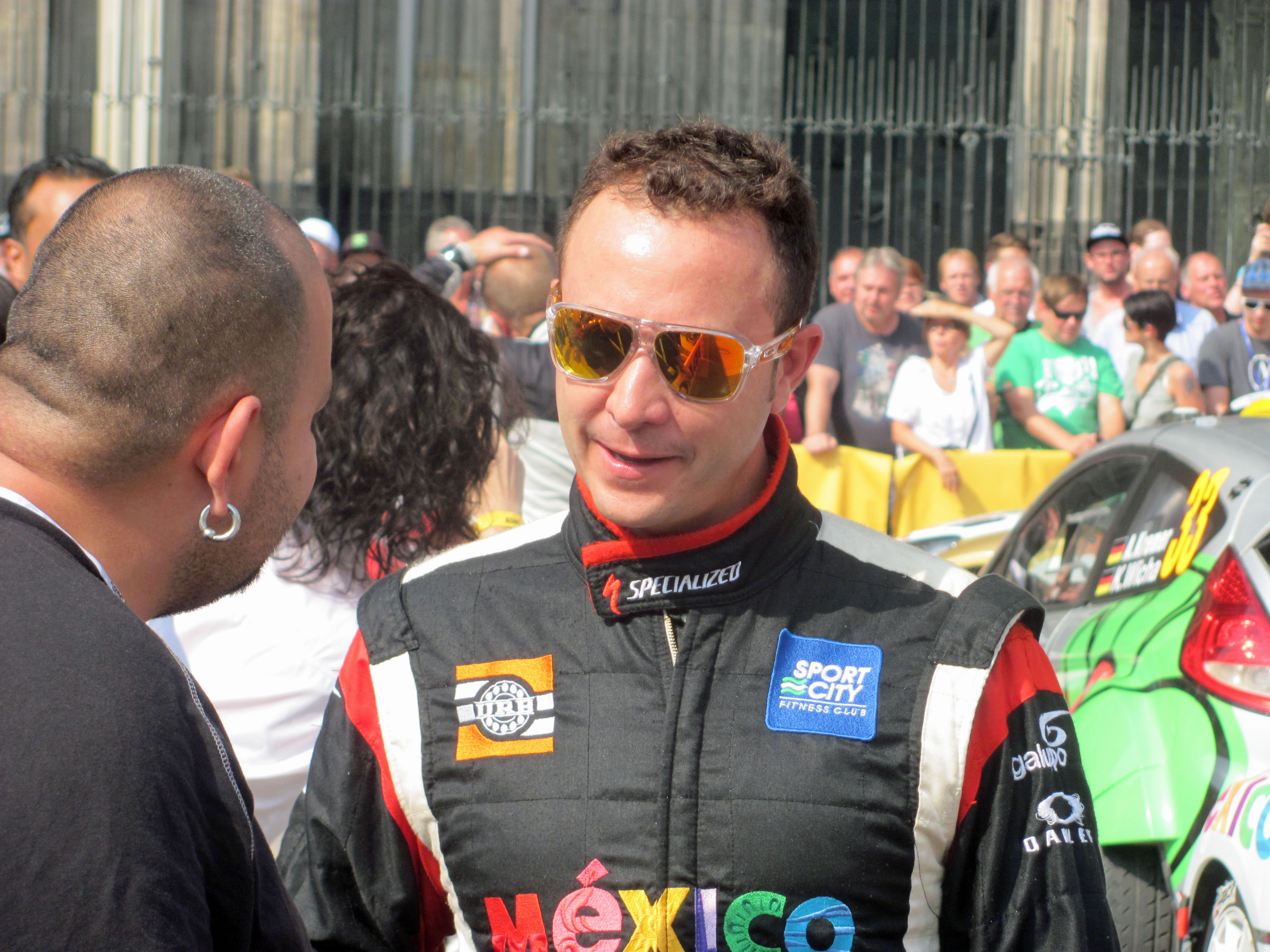
Multiple champion Ricardo Triviño (pictured in 2013)

Year	Driver	Car
2008	(Mexico) Ricardo Triviño	Mitsubishi Lancer Evo IX
2009	(Mexico) Ricardo Triviño	Mitsubishi Lancer Evo IX
2010	(Peru) Nicolás Fuchs	Mitsubishi Lancer Evo IX
2011	(Peru) Raúl Orlandini Griswold	Mitsubishi Lancer Evo IX
2012	(Mexico) Ricardo Triviño	Mitsubishi Lancer Evo IX
2013	(Mexico) Ricardo Triviño	Mitsubishi Lancer Evo X
2014	(Mexico) Ricardo Triviño	Mitsubishi Lancer Evo X
2015	(Mexico) Ricardo Triviño	Mitsubishi Lancer Evo X
2016	(Mexico) Ricardo Triviño	Mitsubishi Lancer Evo X Citroën DS3 R5
2017	(Mexico) Ricardo Triviño	Mitsubishi Lancer Evo X Citroën DS3 R5
2018	(Mexico) Ricardo Triviño	Citroën DS3 R5
2019	(Mexico) Ricardo Triviño	Škoda Fabia R5
2020	(Mexico) Ricardo Triviño	Škoda Fabia Rally2 Evo
2021	(Mexico) Ricardo Cordero, Jr	Citroën C3 Rally2
2022	(Mexico) Ricardo Cordero, Jr	Citroën C3 Rally2
2023	(Mexico) Ricardo Cordero, Jr	Citroën C3 Rally2
2024	(Mexico) Alejandro Mauro	Škoda Fabia Rally2 evo
