= Citroën DS3 R5 =

Citroën R5 rally car

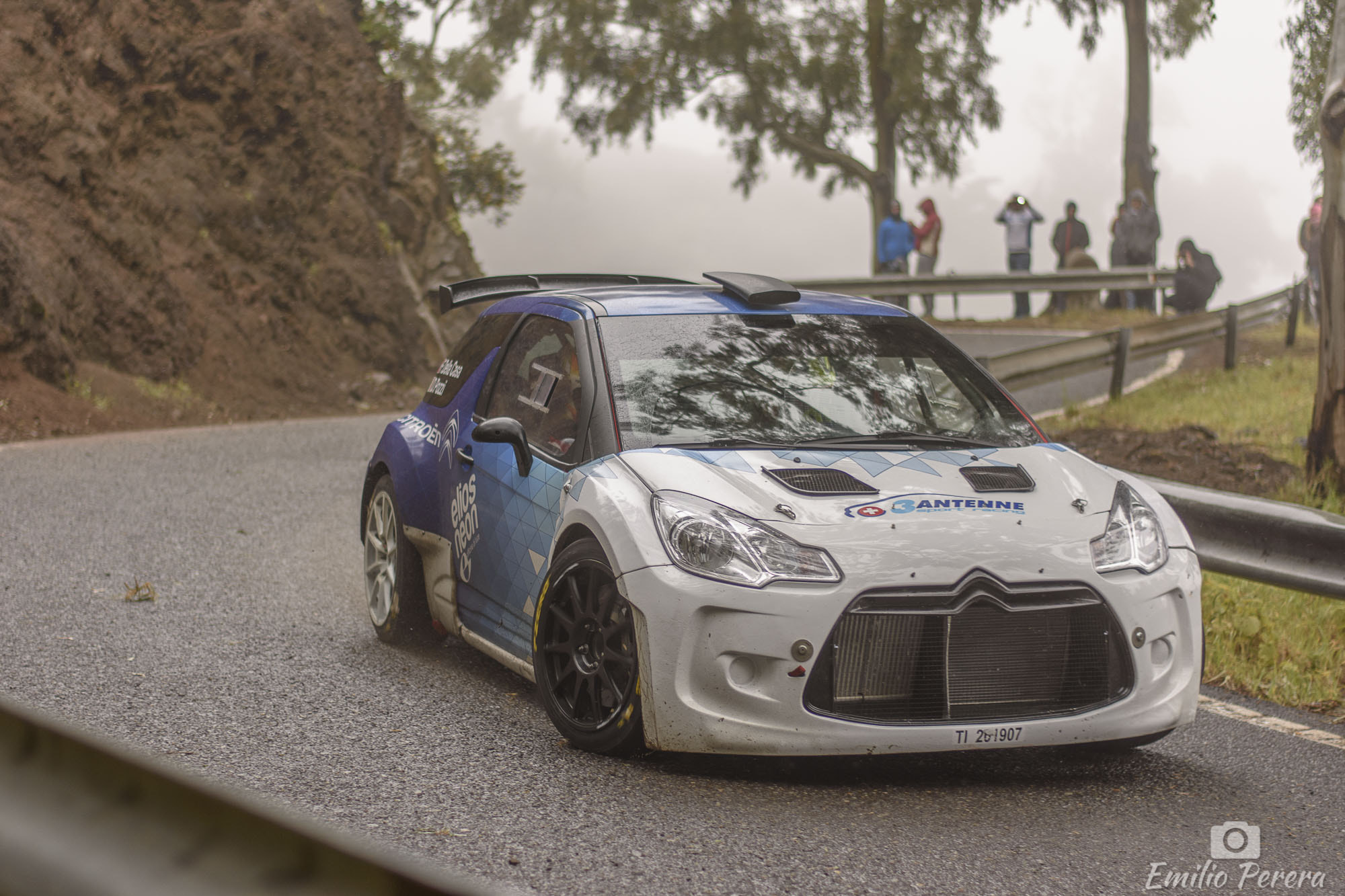
- A DS3 R5 in 2016
- Category: R5
- Constructor: Citroën Racing
- Designer: Xavier Mestelan-Pinon
- Successor: Citroën C3 R5

Technical specifications
- Length: 3,948 mm (155.4 in)
- Width: 1,820 mm (71.7 in)
- Wheelbase: 2,460 mm (96.9 in)
- Engine: PSA 1.6 L (98 cu in) 4-cylinder, 16-valve turbocharged front transverse
- Transmission: five-speed sequential 4-wheel drive
- Weight: 1,200 kg (2,645.5 lb)
- Tyres: Michelin

Competition history
- Debut: (Italy) 2014 Rally Italia Sardegna

The Citroën DS3 R5 is a R5 rally car built by Citroën Racing, the motorsport division of the French automobile manufacturer Citroën, based upon the Citroën DS3 road car. The car was specifically developed for entry in the WRC-2 category of the World Rally Championship, and made its WRC debut at the 2014 Rally Italia Sardegna.

== The Project and the first tests ==
The DS3 R5 replaced the Citroën DS3 RRC (Regional Rally Car), a detuned version of the successful DS3 WRC introduced in 2012. Like its predecessor, it was designed to be sold to private teams and drivers to compete primarily in the WRC-2, ERC, and FIA MERC championships, the latter being a rally series held in the Middle East.

Development of the car took Citroën’s engineers about a year, during which they focused mainly on the engine and suspension with the aim of creating a versatile car capable of performing well on all surfaces, while incorporating several components shared between the gravel and asphalt specifications.

The car was unveiled in April 2013 during the Rally de Portugal, while the first on-road tests took place the following July with the involvement of French driver Sébastien Chardonnet—winner of the 2012 WRC-3 championship with the DS3 R3T, the R5’s “younger sister”—and Kris Meeke, an official driver for Citroën’s top-tier team. The FIA granted official homologation on 1 April 2014, after approximately 8,000 km of testing.

== Technical Specifications ==
The engine is a 1.6-litre EP6 CDT, a transversely mounted inline-four with an aluminum block and head, DOHC with variable valve timing, 16 Magneti Marelli direct-injection valves, and a turbocharger fitted with a 32 mm intake restrictor. It produces 280 hp at 6,000 rpm and a maximum torque of 400 Nm at 2,500 rpm.

The car features permanent all-wheel drive with self-locking front and rear differentials, a five-speed sequential gearbox, and a multi-plate clutch. The suspension system uses MacPherson struts with Citroën Racing dampers, while the braking system is equipped with four-piston Alcon calipers and self-ventilated discs measuring 300 mm in diameter on gravel and 355 mm on asphalt, both front and rear.

The DS3 R5 is fitted with 18-inch aluminum wheels for asphalt and 15-inch wheels for gravel.

== Racing History ==
The first DS3 R5 delivered made its debut in April 2014 at the Sanremo Rally, a round of the 2014 Italian Rally Championship and the European Rally Trophy. Its first appearance in a World Rally Championship event also took place in Italy, at the 2014 Rally Sardegna, where Sébastien Chardonnet finished 11th overall and second in the WRC-2 class.

The opening round of the 2015 World Championship brought the DS3 R5 its first category victory, claimed by Stéphane Lefebvre at the Monte Carlo Rally, where he also finished twelfth overall. The car achieved another podium that season with Estonian driver Karl Kruuda, who finished third at the Rally Poland.

In 2016, the car competed in ten World Championship events with various drivers, achieving two third-place finishes as its best results: at the Monte Carlo Rally with Quentin Gilbert and at the Tour de Corse with Yoann Bonato. The same tally was achieved in 2017, when Yohan Rossel and Simone Tempestini finished on the third step of the podium at the Tour de Corse and the Rally de Portugal, respectively.

The 2018 season began with a second-place finish by Italian driver Eddie Sciessere at the Monte Carlo Rally, but the French team planned the launch of the car set to replace the DS3 R5—the new C3 R5—in April, ahead of the Tour de Corse, with the aim of immediately contending for the WRC-2 title.

== WRC2 Victories ==
| No. | Event | Season | Driver | Co-driver |
|---|---|---|---|---|
| 1 | (Monaco) Monte Carlo Rally | 2015 | (France) Stéphane Lefebvre | (France) Quentin Gilbert |

== ERC Victories ==
| No. | Event | Season | Driver | Co-driver |
|---|---|---|---|---|
| 1 | (Northern Ireland) / (Republic of Ireland) Circuit of Ireland | 2016 | (Republic of Ireland) Craig Breen | (United Kingdom) Scott Martin |
