= Ricardo Triviño =

Mexican rally driver (born 1973)

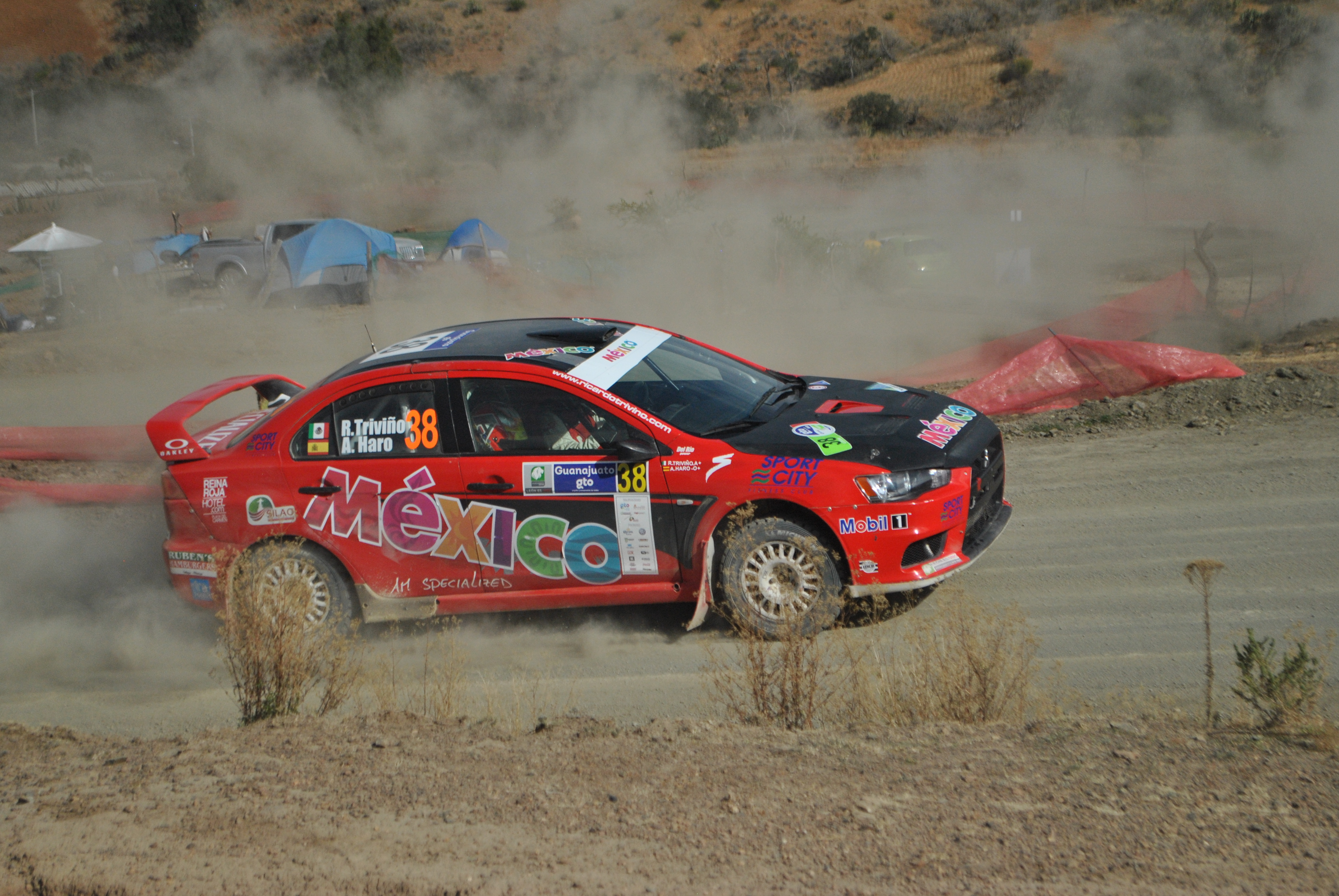

Personal information
- Nationality: (Mexico) Mexican
- Born: February 5, 1973 (age 53)

World Rally Championship record
- Years active: 2002–present
- Co-driver: (Mexico) Jorge Bernal (Spain) Jordi Barrabés (Argentina) Jorge Gonzalez (Spain) Alejandro Noriega (Spain) Carlos del Barrio (Spain) "Checo Salom" (Argentina) Claudio Bustos (Spain) Borja Aguado (Spain) Álex Haro (Mexico) Marco Hernández (Spain) Mario Tomé (Spain) Marc Martí (Spain) Diego Fuentes
- Rallies: 56
- Championships: 0
- Rally wins: 0
- Podiums: 0
- Stage wins: 0
- Total points: 2
- First rally: 2002 Rally Catalunya

Ricardo Triviño (born 15 February 1973) is a Mexican rally driver and multiple champion of NACAM Rally Championship.

In 2011, Triviño and his co-driver Marco Hernández got the first overall in La Carrera Panamericana in a Studebaker just 4.5 seconds ahead from the American driver Douglas Mockett.

Triviño competed in the 2012 season in PWRC category, where he finished in seventh place with 52 points.

== Racing record ==
=== Complete WRC results ===
Year	Entrant	Car	1	2	3	4	5	6	7	8	9	10	11	12	13	14	15	16	WDC	Pts
2002	Ricardo Triviño	Mitsubishi Lancer Evo VII	MON	SWE	FRA	ESP; Ret	CYP		GRE	KEN	FIN	GER	ITA	NZL	AUS	GBR			NC	0
2002	Ricardo Triviño	Mitsubishi Lancer Evo VI						ARG; Ret											NC	0
2003	Ricardo Triviño	Mitsubishi Lancer Evo VII	MON	SWE; Ret	TUR	NZL; 31	ARG; 22	GRE	CYP; Ret	GER; 34	FIN	AUS	ITA	FRA; 25	ESP; Ret	GBR			NC	0
2004	Ricardo Triviño	Mitsubishi Lancer Evo VII	MON	SWE; 38	MEX; 18														NC	0
2004	Ricardo Triviño	Mitsubishi Lancer Evo VIII				NZL; 30	CYP	GRE	TUR	ARG; Ret	FIN	GER; 31	JPN	GBR	ITA	FRA; 23	ESP; 28	AUS	NC	0
2005	Ricardo Triviño	Peugeot 206 WRC	MON	SWE	MEX; 12	NZL	ITA	CYP	TUR		ARG; 18	FIN	GER	GBR	JPN	FRA	ESP; 20	AUS	NC	0
2005	Ricardo Triviño	Mitsubishi Lancer Evo VIII								GRE; Ret									NC	0
2006	Ricardo Triviño	Peugeot 206 WRC	MON	SWE	MEX; EX	ESP	FRA	ARG	ITA	GRE	GER	FIN	JPN	CYP	TUR	AUS	NZL	GBR	NC	0
2007	Ricardo Triviño	Peugeot 206 WRC	MON	SWE	NOR	MEX	POR	ARG	ITA	GRE	FIN; 43	GER	NZL	ESP					NC	0
2008	Ricardo Triviño	Peugeot 206 WRC	MON	SWE	MEX; EX														NC	0
2008	Ricardo Triviño	Mitsubishi Lancer Evo IX				ARG; Ret	JOR	ITA	GRE	TUR	FIN	GER	NZL	ESP	FRA	JPN	GBR		NC	0
2011	Ricardo Triviño	Mitsubishi Lancer Evo X	SWE; EX	MEX	POR	JOR	ITA	ARG	GRE	FIN	GER	AUS	FRA	ESP	GBR				NC	0
2012	Ricardo Triviño	Ford Fiesta RS WRC	MON	SWE	MEX; 10														31st	1
2012	Ricardo Triviño	Subaru Impreza WRX STi				POR; 26		GRE; 16			GER; 22	GBR	FRA; 28	ITA; 22	ESP; 35				31st	1
2012	Ricardo Triviño	Mitsubishi Lancer Evo X					ARG; Ret												31st	1
2012	Ricardo Triviño	Mitsubishi Lancer Evo IX							NZL; 19	FIN									31st	1
2013	Moto Club Igualda	Mitsubishi Lancer Evo X	MON; 29	SWE; 23	MEX; 14	POR													NC	0
2013	Moto Club Igualda	Mitsubishi Lancer Evo IX					ARG; 19	GRE; 28	ITA	FIN									NC	0
2013	Moto Club Igualda	Subaru Impreza WRX STi									GER; 32	AUS	FRA; 27	ESP	GBR				NC	0
2014	Ricardo Triviño	Mitsubishi Lancer Evo X	MON	SWE	MEX; 16	POR	ARG	ITA	POL	FIN	GER	AUS	FRA	ESP	GBR				NC	0
2015	Ricardo Triviño	Mitsubishi Lancer Evo X	MON	SWE	MEX; Ret	ARG	POR	ITA	POL	FIN	GER	AUS	FRA	ESP	GBR				NC	0
2016	Triviño World Rally Team	Citroën DS3 R5	MON; 61	SWE									ESP; 42	GBR	AUS				NC	0
2016	Triviño World Rally Team	Mitsubishi Lancer Evo X			MEX; 17	ARG	POR	ITA	POL	FIN	GER	FRA							NC	0
2017	Ricardo Triviño	Citroën DS3 R5	MON	SWE	MEX; 14	FRA	ARG	POR	ITA	POL	FIN	GER	ESP	GBR	AUS				NC	0
2018	Ricardo Triviño	Citroën DS3 R5	MON	SWE	MEX; 19	FRA	ARG	POR	ITA	FIN	GER	TUR	GBR	ESP	AUS				NC	0
2019	Ricardo Triviño	Škoda Fabia R5	MON	SWE	MEX; 10	FRA	ARG	CHL	POR	ITA	FIN	GER	TUR	GBR	ESP	AUS; C			31st	1
2020	Ricardo Triviño	Škoda Fabia R5	MON	SWE	MEX; 12	EST	TUR	ITA	MNZ										NC	0
2022	Ricardo Triviño	Škoda Fabia Rally2 evo	MON	SWE	CRO; 45	POR	ITA	KEN	EST	FIN	BEL	GRE	NZL	ESP	JPN<				NC	0
2024	Ricardo Triviño	Škoda Fabia RS Rally2	MON	SWE; 32	KEN	CRO; 34	POR	ITA; 26	POL; 30	LAT	FIN; 32	GRE	CHL	EUR	JPN				NC*	0*

* Season still in progress.

==== PWRC results ====
Year	Entrant	Car	1	2	3	4	5	6	7	8	Pos.	Pts
2012	Ricardo Triviño	Mitsubishi Lancer Evo X	MON	MEX	ARG; Ret						7th	52
2012	Ricardo Triviño	Subaru Impreza WRX STi				GRE; 3		GER; 4	ITA; 7	ESP; 8	7th	52
2012	Ricardo Triviño	Mitsubishi Lancer Evo IX					NZL; 3				7th	52

==== WRC-2 results ====
Year	Entrant	Car	1	2	3	4	5	6	7	8	9	10	11	12	13	Pos.	Pts
2013	Moto Club Igualda	Mitsubishi Lancer Evo X	MON; 5	SWE; 7	MEX; 3	POR										8th	55
2013	Moto Club Igualda	Mitsubishi Lancer Evo IX					ARG; 6	GRE; 13	ITA	FIN						8th	55
2013	Moto Club Igualda	Subaru Impreza WRX STi									GER; 7	AUS	FRA; 5	ESP	GBR	8th	55
2016	Triviño World Rally Team	Citroën DS3 R5	MON; 12	SWE	MEX; WD	ARG	POR	ITA	POL	FIN	GER	FRA	ESP; 10	GBR	AUS	42nd	1

==== WRC-3 results ====
Year	Entrant	Car	1	2	3	4	5	6	7	Pos.	Points
2020	Ricardo Triviño	Škoda Fabia R5	MON	SWE	MEX; 3	EST	TUR	ITA	MNZ	14th	15

Sporting positions
Preceded by inaugural	NACAM Rally Champion; 2008 & 2009	Succeeded by Nicolás Fuchs
Preceded by Raúl Orlandini Griswold	NACAM Rally Champion; 2012–2017	Succeeded by incumbent
