= Fiat Punto =

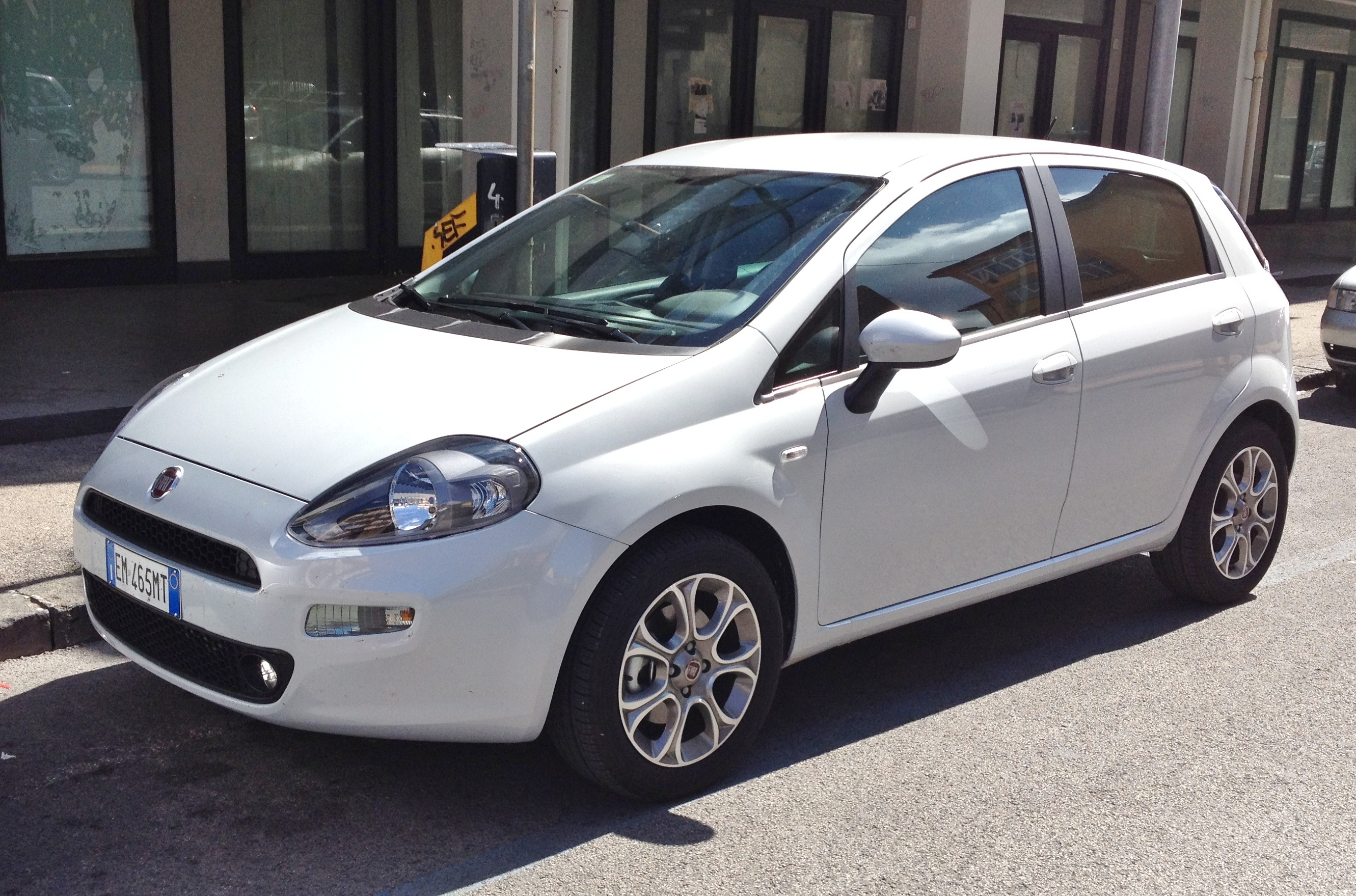

Overview
- Manufacturer: Fiat Auto (1993–2007); Fiat Group Automobiles (2007–2014); FCA Italy (2014–2018)
- Production: 1993–2018

Body and chassis
- Class: Supermini (B)
- Body style: 3-door hatchback 5-door hatchback 2-door convertible (Note: The first generation only.); 3-door van
- Layout: Front-engine, front-wheel-drive

Chronology
- Predecessor: Fiat Uno
- Successor: Fiat Grande Panda (Europe); Fiat Argo (Latin America)

The Fiat Punto is a supermini car (B-segment) produced by the Italian manufacturer Fiat from 1993 to 2018, spanning over three generations. The third generation of the car was marketed between 2005 and 2009 as the Grande Punto, and between 2009 and 2012 as the Punto Evo, until the single-word Punto name was reintroduced. As of May 2013, nearly nine million units had been sold globally.

Production of the first generation Punto was 3.43 million units, second generation 2.96 million units, and third generation 2.67 million units.

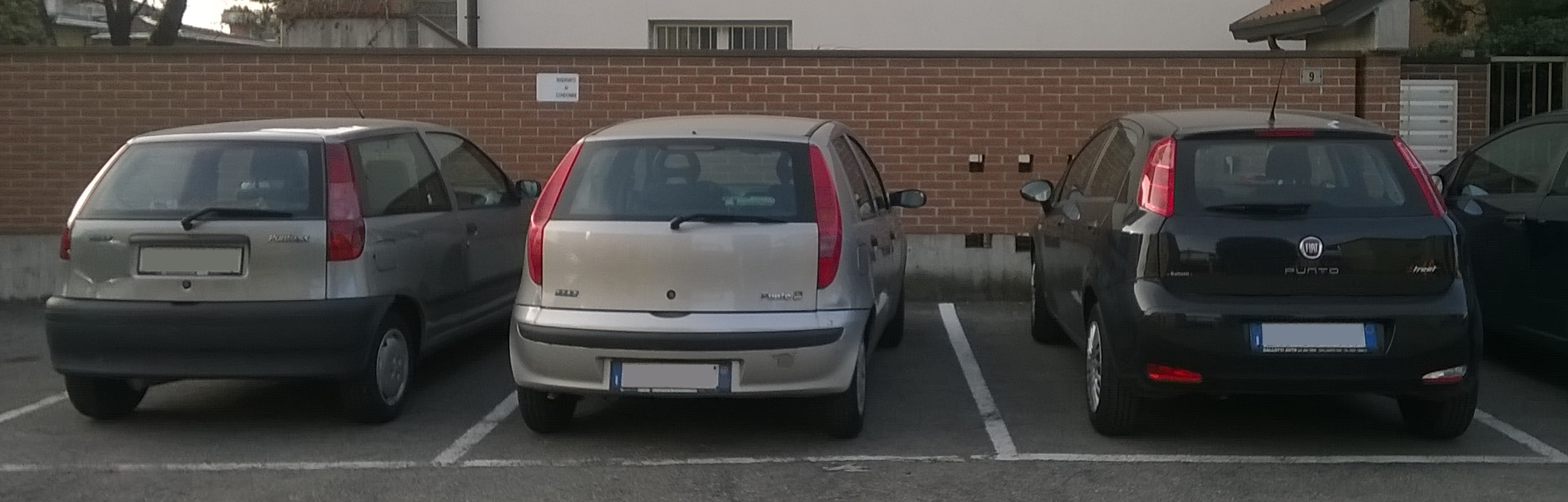
First, second and third-generation Puntos

== First generation (Type 176; 1993) ==
First generation
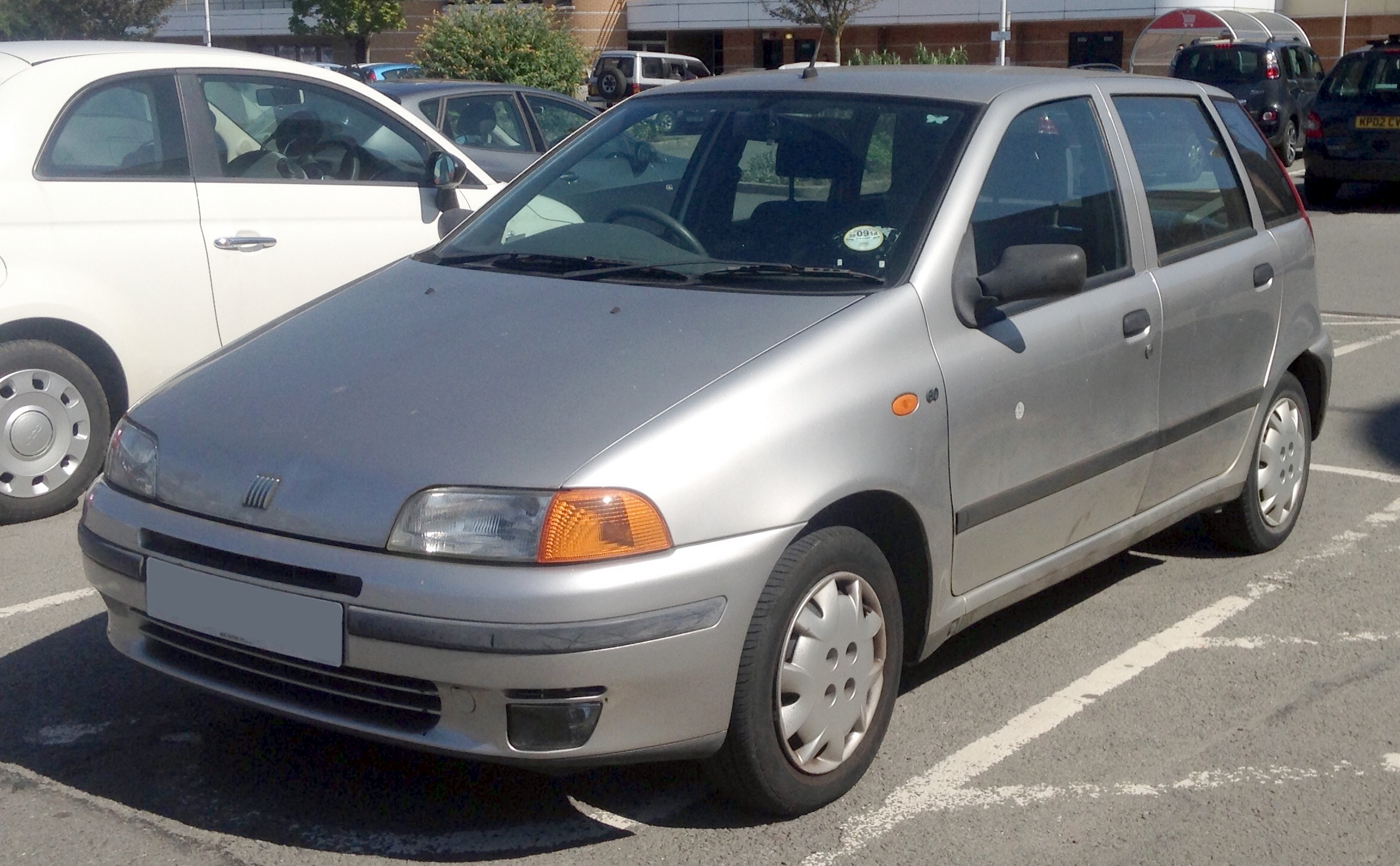
- Fiat Punto SX Selecta, 1998

Overview
- Model code: 176
- Production: June 1993–1999
- Assembly: Italy: Melfi, Basilicata; Italy: Mirafiori, Turin; Italy: Termini Imerese, Sicily; Poland: Tychy (Fiat Auto Poland)
- Designer: Giorgetto Giugiaro at Italdesign (hatchback and convertible)

Body and chassis
- Body style: 3-door hatchback 5-door hatchback 2-door convertible 3-door van
- Related: Fiat Barchetta; Fiat Palio; Fiat Siena; Lancia Y (840)

Powertrain
- Engine: petrol: 1.1 L I4; 1.2 L I4; 1.2 L 16V I4; 1.4 L turbo I4; 1.6 L I4; diesel: 1.7 L I4; 1.7 L turbo I4
- Transmission: 5-speed manual 6-speed manual CVT automatic

Dimensions
- Wheelbase: 2,450 mm (96.5 in)
- Length: 3,760 mm (148.0 in)
- Width: 1,625 mm (64.0 in)
- Height: 1,450 mm (57.1 in)
- Curb weight: 830–1,040 kg (1,830–2,293 lb); 1,070 kg (2,359 lb) (cabrio)

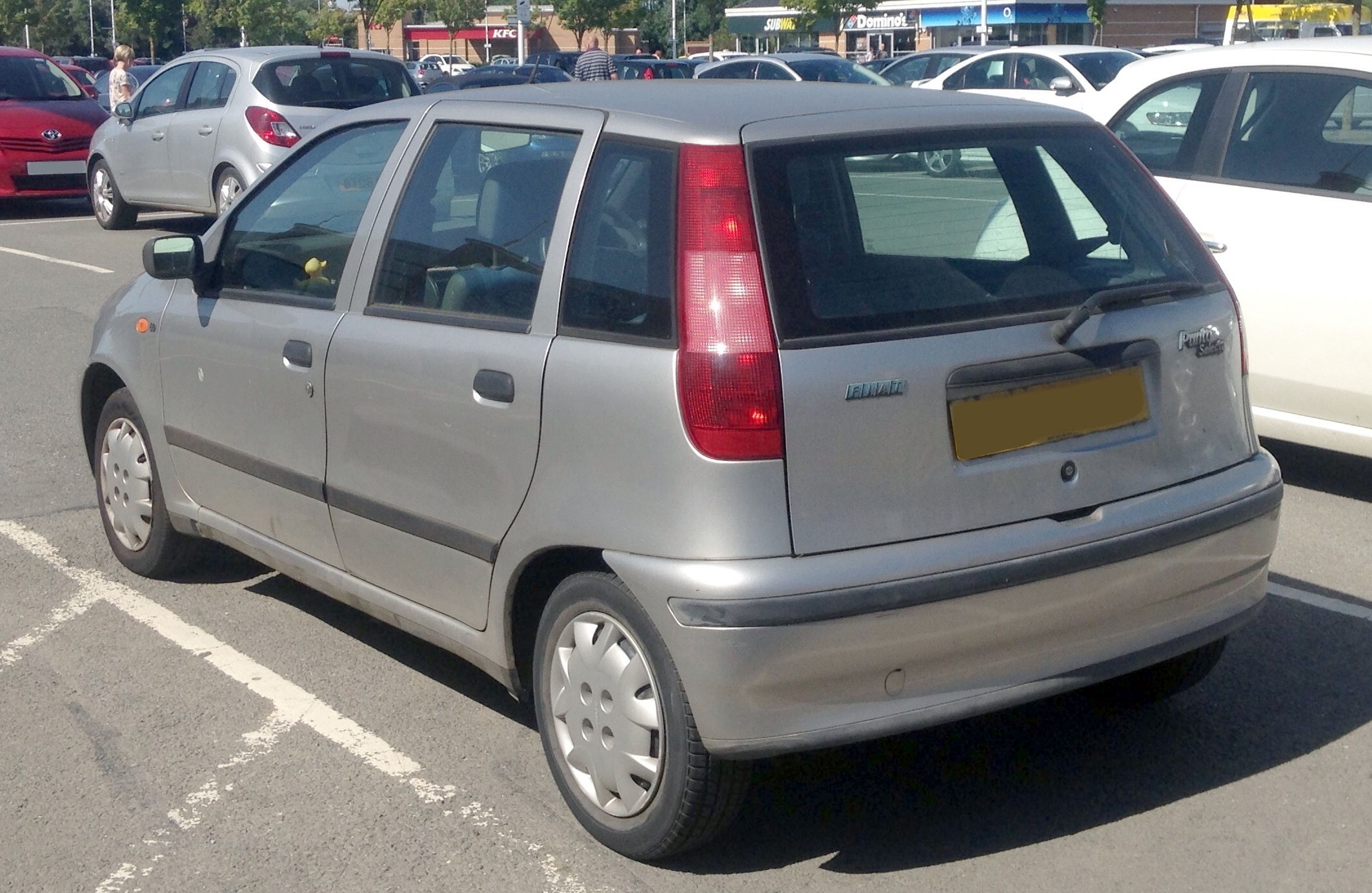
Five door

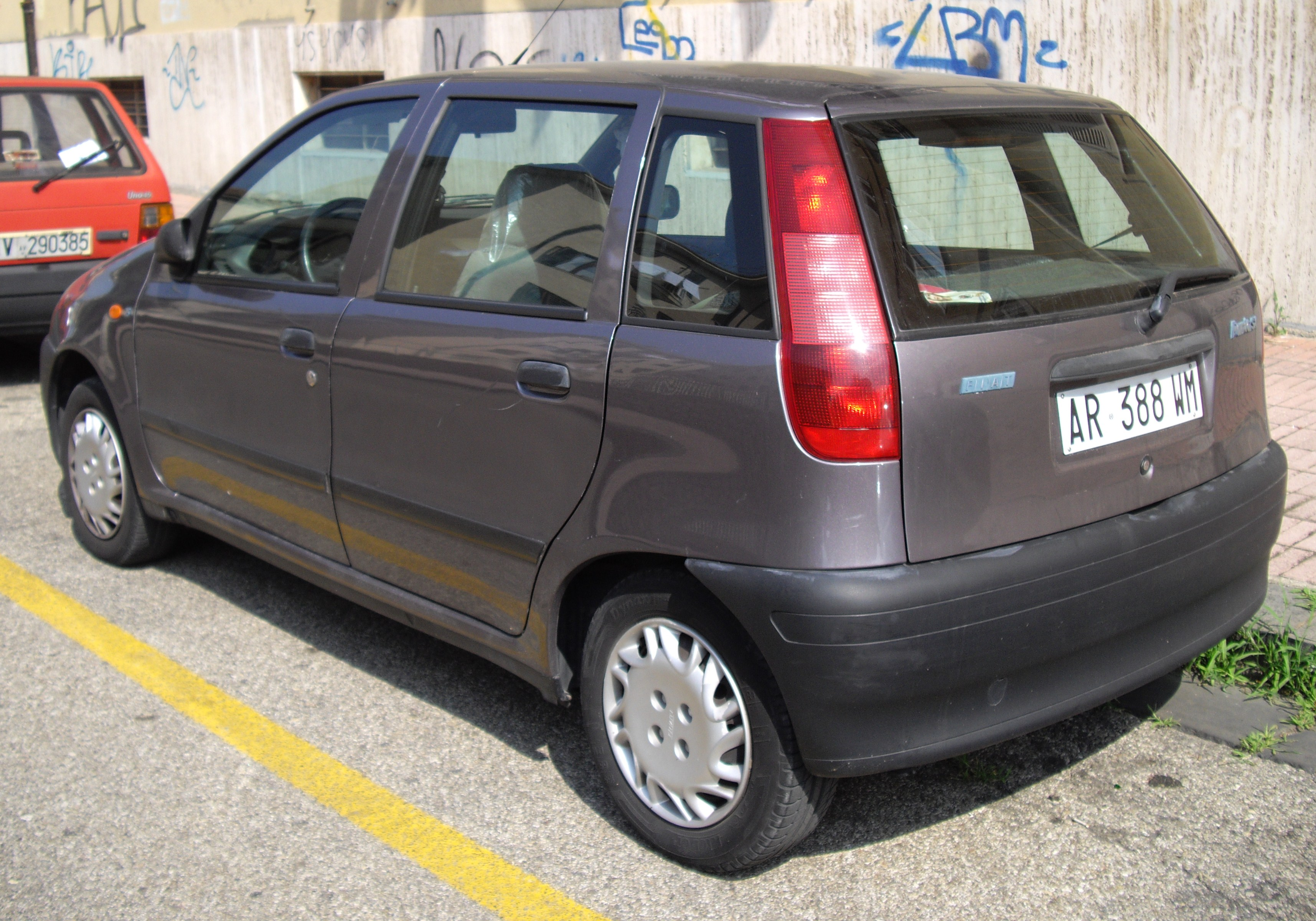
Five door

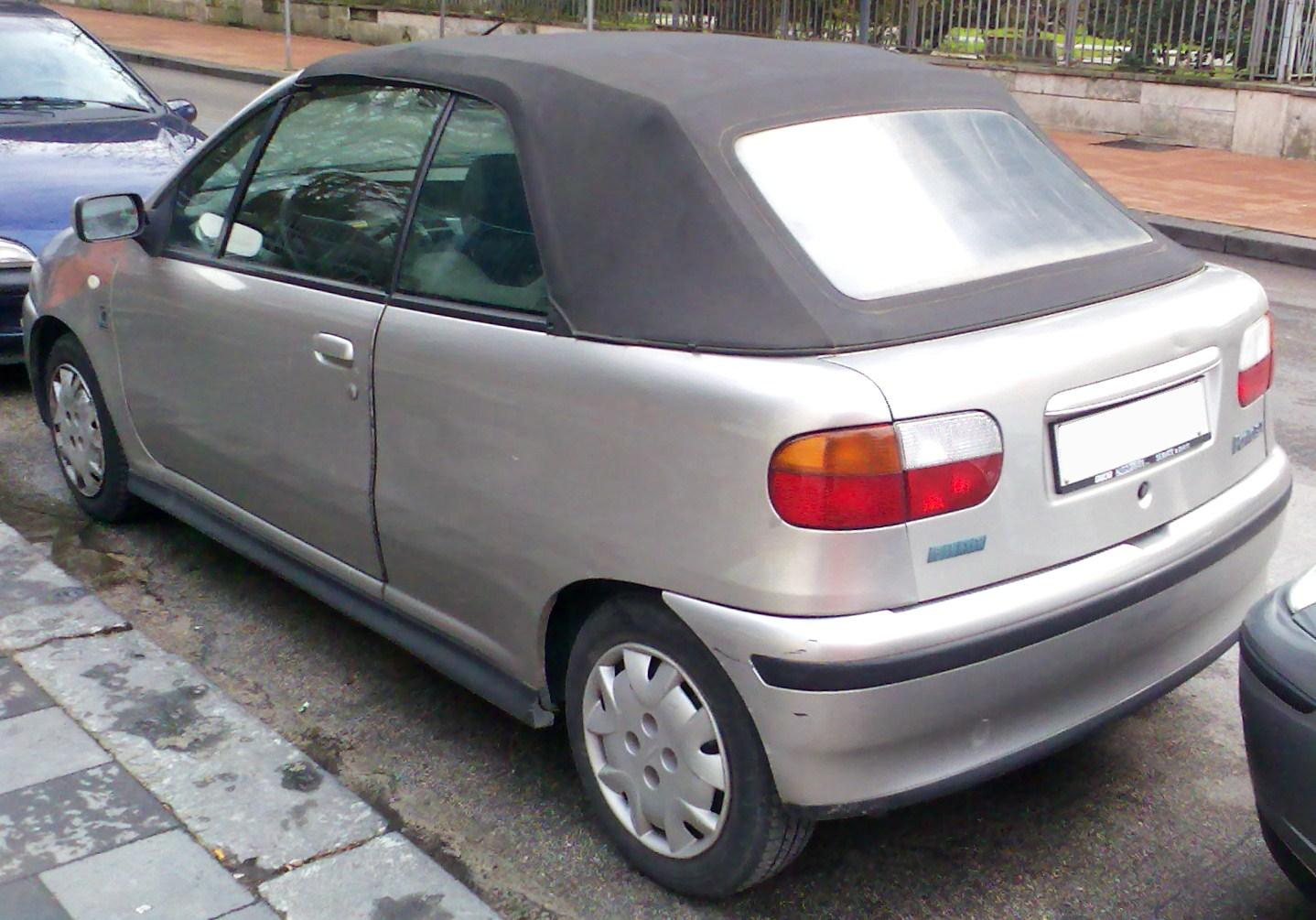
Cabrio

Internally codenamed Project 176, the Punto was announced in September 1993, as a replacement for the aging Fiat Uno, and launched at the end of 1993 or the beginning of 1994, depending on the market. The Fiat Punto was voted European Car of the Year for 1995, soundly defeating rival Volkswagen Polo with 370 versus 292 points. The Punto received a very mild restyling in 1997 (new hubcaps, exterior colors and interior trim).

The official launch of the Punto in the United Kingdom was in October 1993, at the London Motorfair.

The Punto was designed by Giorgetto Giugiaro, and originated as a 1990 design proposal for Renault's project X57, which would become the Renault Clio. When Giugiaro's proposal was not chosen, he took the design to Fiat, who accepted it. Giugiaro was awarded the Compasso d'Oro industrial design award in 1994. The Punto was available as a three-door or five-door hatchback, a two-door cabriolet and a three-door panel van. As the majority of the new Fiat group models, the suspension was all independent, composed of MacPherson struts at the front and trailing arms at the rear.

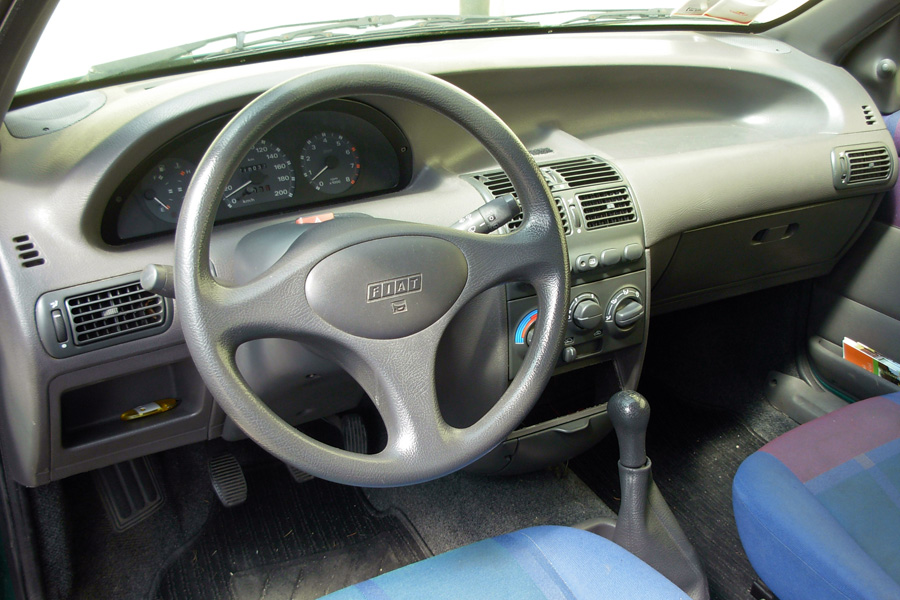
Interior

The entry-level engines in the Punto range were the 1.1 and 1.2 L petrol engines and the 1.7 diesel engine. The 1.2 engine's actual capacity is 1242 cc, available in three versions. The first, was fitted in the Punto ELX 75 and produced 75 PS (55 kW) at 6000 rpm while the second, fitted to Punto ELX 85 produced 86 PS (63 kW) at 6000 rpm.

The third was a 60 PS (44 kW) engine which eventually replaced the 1.1 54 PS (40 kW) engine.

=== Sporting versions ===
A Sporting model was also available with an updated, 1.6-liter, eight-valve 128 SOHC engine, producing 90 PS (66 kW). This was later replaced in 1997 by the 1.2 16v FIRE engine used in the 85 ELX, and an associated power drop to 86 PS (63 kW).

=== GT versions ===
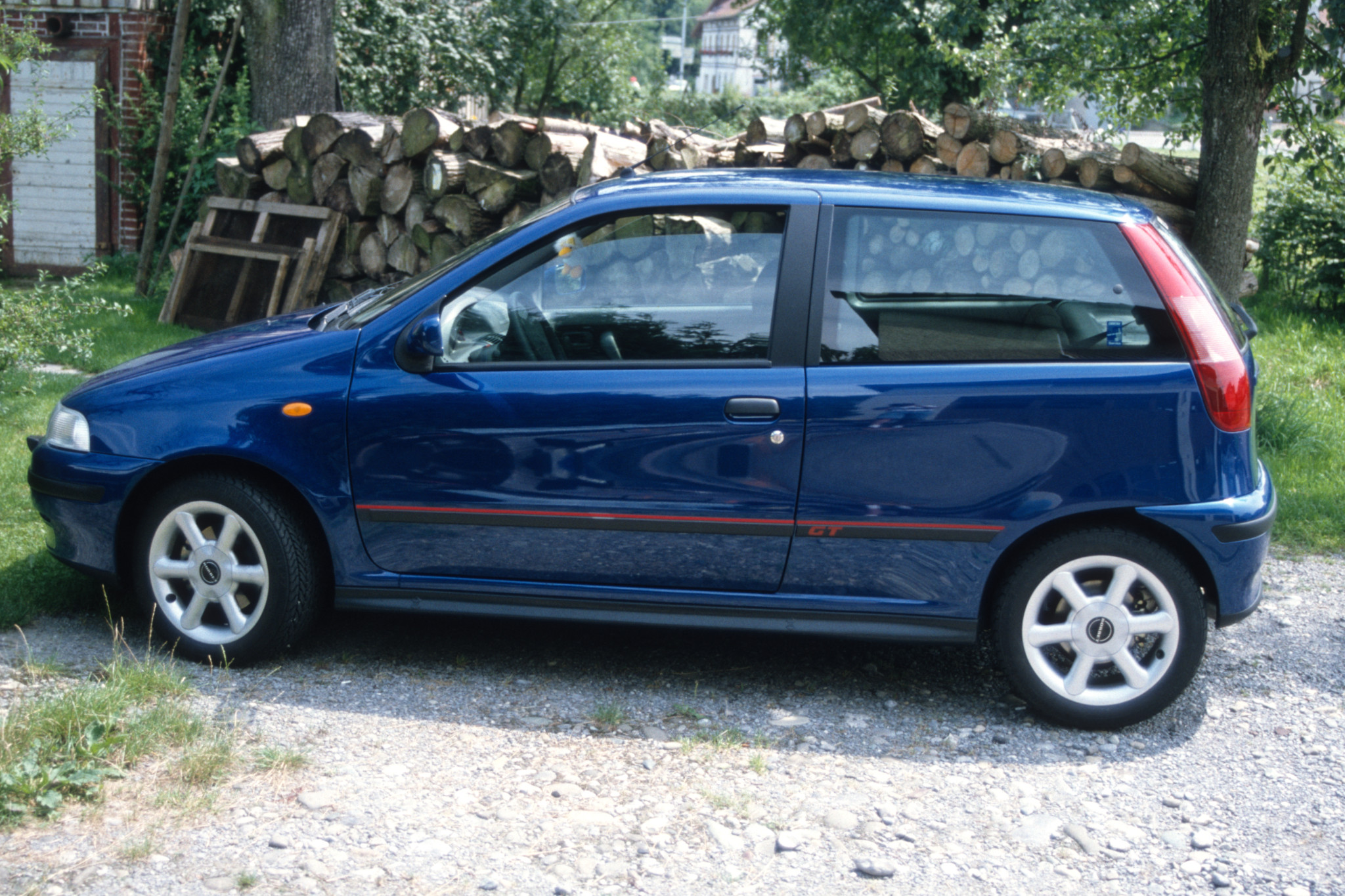
Fiat Punto GT

The top of the range model was the 136 PS (100 kW) 1.4 GT, using an evolution of the turbocharged 128 SOHC engine originally found in the Fiat Uno Turbo Mk II, capable of running over 200 km/h (120 mph) and reaching 100 km/h (62 mph) in 7.9 seconds, and came fitted with a five speed manual gearbox.

During the years, the GT was made in three different "series", producing 136 PS (100 kW) (1993–1995), 133 PS (98 kW) (1995–1997), and 130 PS (96 kW) (1997–1999).

=== Convertible ===
A cabriolet (convertible) version was also available, also designed by Giorgetto Giugiaro but built by Bertone (rather than at the main Fiat factory). The horizontal rear light clusters were totally different than the vertical ones of the Punto hatchback. It was available in SX trim, with 1.2 60 PS (44 kW) FIRE engine, and ELX trim, initially powered by the 90 PS (66 kW) 1.6 Mpi unit, which was replaced in 1995 by the 86 PS (63 kW) 1.2 litre 16v FIRE unit.

It featured a manually operated fully retracting roof (SX) or an electric-powered one (ELX), and was one of the cheapest open-top cars in the world at the time. Approximately 55,000 cars were built between April 1994 and June 1999, although the last cars were registered in 2000.

=== Other versions ===
Particular versions of the first generation Punto were the Punto 6Speed, a 1.1 FIRE Punto 55 with a six-speed gearbox, the Punto Selecta with a CVT type automatic gearbox, and the Punto ED (Economical Drive), a 1.1 Punto whose five-speed gearbox was designed for high fuel efficiency.

=== Punto Sporting Abarth ===
The Fiat Punto Sporting Abarth is a performance-oriented version of the Fiat Punto, produced by the Italian manufacturer Fiat. Introduced as an upgrade to the Sporting trim, it featured Abarth styling elements, suspension improvements, and enhanced handling. Powered by a 1.8-liter 16-valve engine delivering around 130 hp, it combined compact practicality with sporty performance. The model included Abarth-branded details, side skirts, alloy wheels, and sport seats, while maintaining the everyday usability of the Punto. It represented Fiat’s effort to keep the Abarth heritage alive in the small hatchback segment before the launch of the later Grande Punto Abarth.

=== Punto Grama 2 Maggiora ===
Carrozzeria Maggiora created a one-off performance version dubbed the Punto Grama 2, using the underpinnings from a 1986 Lancia Delta Integrale 8V.

=== Engines ===
Code	Displacement	Type	Power	Torque	Compression
1.1 SPI	1,108 cc	I4	54 PS (40 kW; 53 bhp) at 5500 rpm	86 N·m (63 lb·ft) at 3250 rpm	9.6:1
1.2 SPI	1,242 cc	I4	60 PS (44 kW; 59 bhp) at 5500 rpm	98 N·m (72 lb·ft) at 3000 rpm	9.6:1
1.2 MPI	1,242 cc	I4	73 PS (54 kW; 72 bhp) at 5000 rpm	106 N·m (78 lb·ft) at 4000 rpm	9.8:1
1.2 16v	1,242 cc	I4	86 PS (63 kW; 85 bhp) at 6000 rpm	113 N·m (83 lb·ft) at 4500 rpm	10.2:1
1.4 Turbo	1,372 cc	I4	133–136 PS (98–100 kW; 131–134 hp) at 5750 rpm	208 N·m (153 lb·ft) at 3000 rpm	7.9:1
1.4 Turbo	1,372 cc	I4	130 PS (96 kW; 128 hp) at 5600 rpm	200 N·m (148 lb·ft) at 3000 rpm	9.0:1
1.6 MPI	1,581 cc	I4	90 PS (66 kW; 89 bhp) at 5750 rpm	129 N·m (95 lb·ft) at 2750 rpm	9.5:1
1.7 Diesel	1,698 cc	I4	57 PS (42.5 kW; 56 hp) at 4500 rpm	98 N·m (72 lb·ft) at 2500 rpm	19:1
1.7 Diesel	1,698 cc	I4	64 PS (47.8 kW; 63 hp) at 4500 rpm	118 N·m (87 lb·ft) at 2500 rpm	19:1
1.7 Diesel	1,698 cc	I4	72 PS (53.7 kW; 70 hp) at 4500 rpm	137 N·m (101 lb·ft) at 2500 rpm	19:1

== Second generation (Type 188; 1999) ==
Second generation
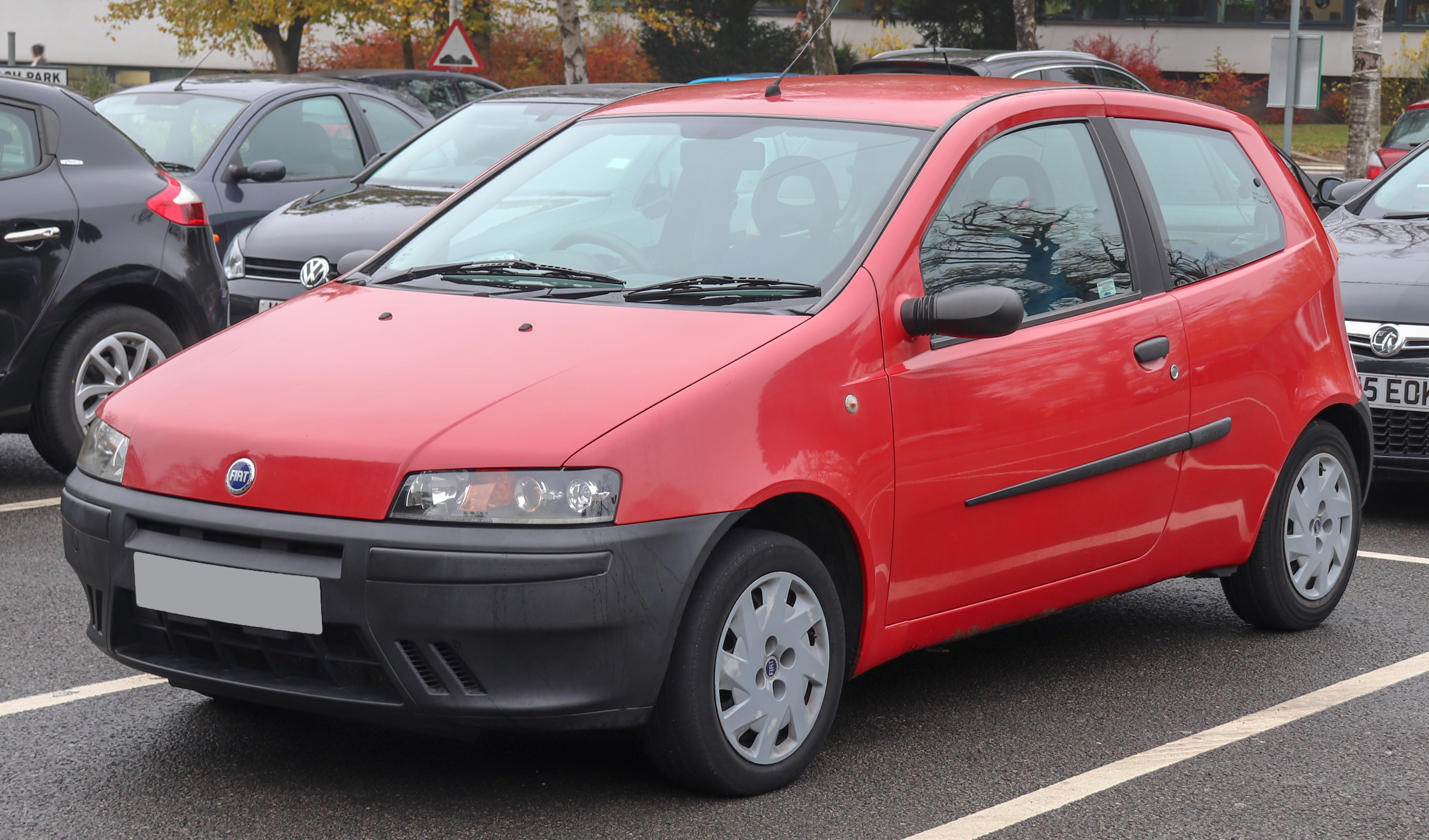

Overview
- Model code: 188
- Also called: Fiat Punto Classic; Zastava 10
- Production: February 1999–2010 (Italy); 2006–2008 (Serbia; Zastava); 2009–2011, 2013 (Serbia; Fiat)
- Assembly: Italy: Melfi, Potenza; Italy: Mirafiori, Turin; Italy: Termini Imerese, Palermo; Serbia: Kragujevac (Zastava)

Body and chassis
- Body style: 3-door hatchback 5-door hatchback 3-door van
- Platform: Fiat B-platform
- Related: Fiat Idea; Lancia Ypsilon (843); Lancia Musa

Powertrain
- Engine: petrol: 1.2 L I4; 1.2 L 16v I4; 1.4 L 16v I4; 1.8 L 16v I4; diesel: 1.3 L MultiJet I4; 1.9 L I4; 1.9 L JTD I4
- Transmission: 5-speed manual 6-speed manual (Sporting); 5-speed automated manual (Dualogic); CVT (Speedgear); CVT (Speedgear)

Dimensions
- Wheelbase: 2,460 mm (96.9 in)
- Length: 3,800 mm (149.6 in) (3-door, 1999–03); 3,835 mm (151.0 in) (5-door, 1999–03); 3,840 mm (151.2 in) (3-door, 2003–10); 3,865 mm (152.2 in) (5-door, 2003–10)
- Width: 1,660 mm (65.4 in)
- Height: 1,480 mm (58.3 in)
- Curb weight: 860–1,050 kg (1,896–2,315 lb)

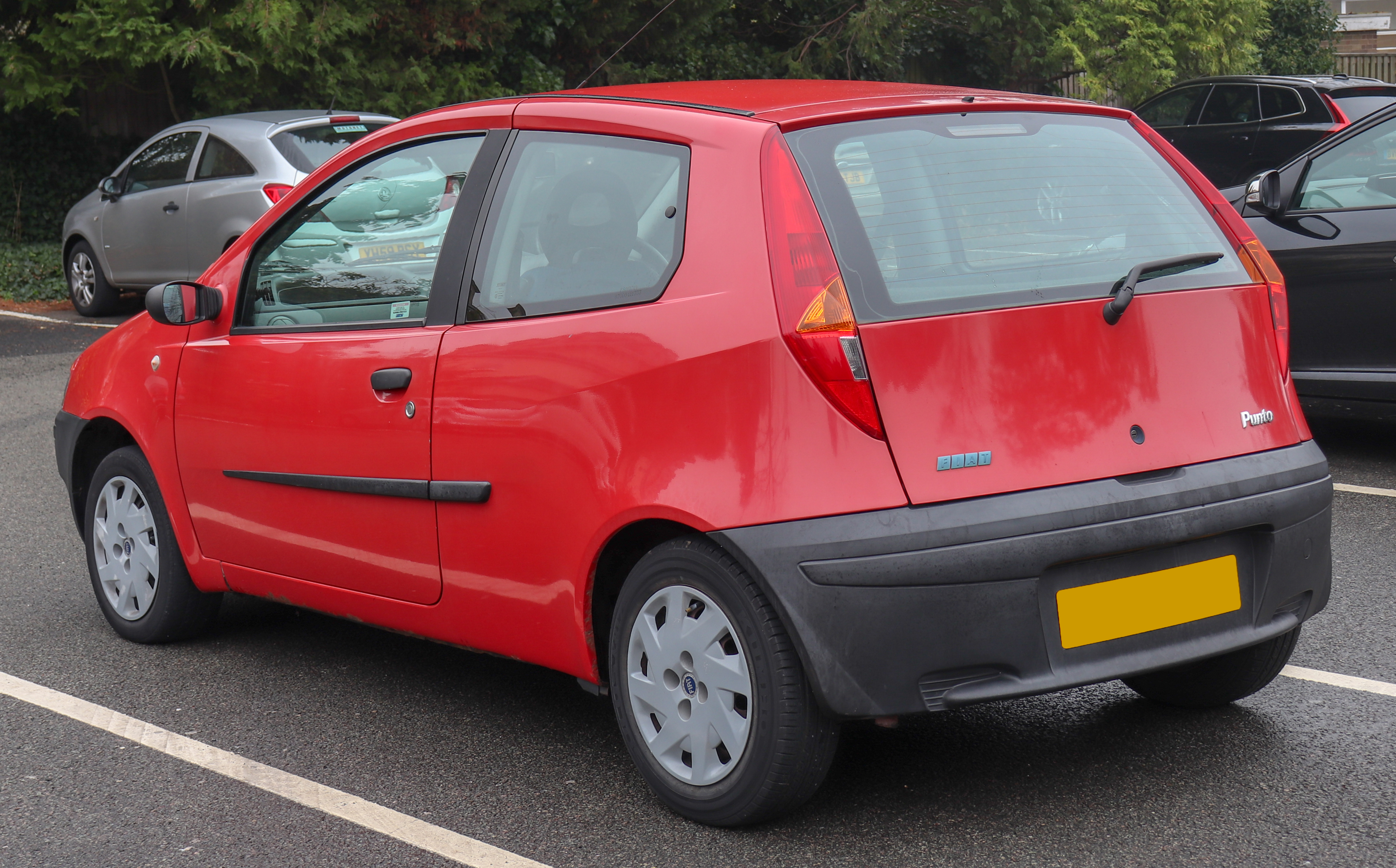
Three door (pre-facelift)

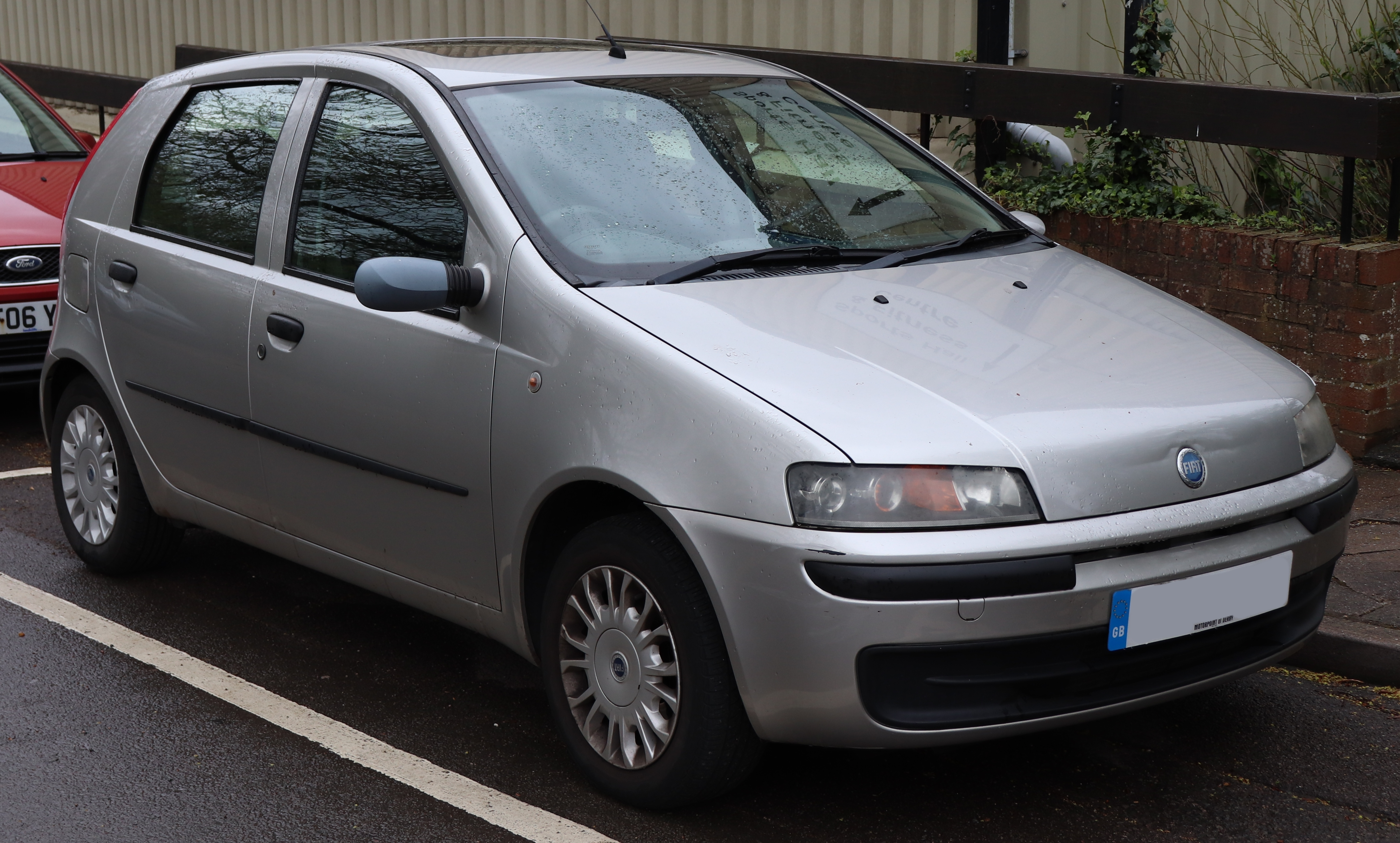
Five door (pre-facelift)

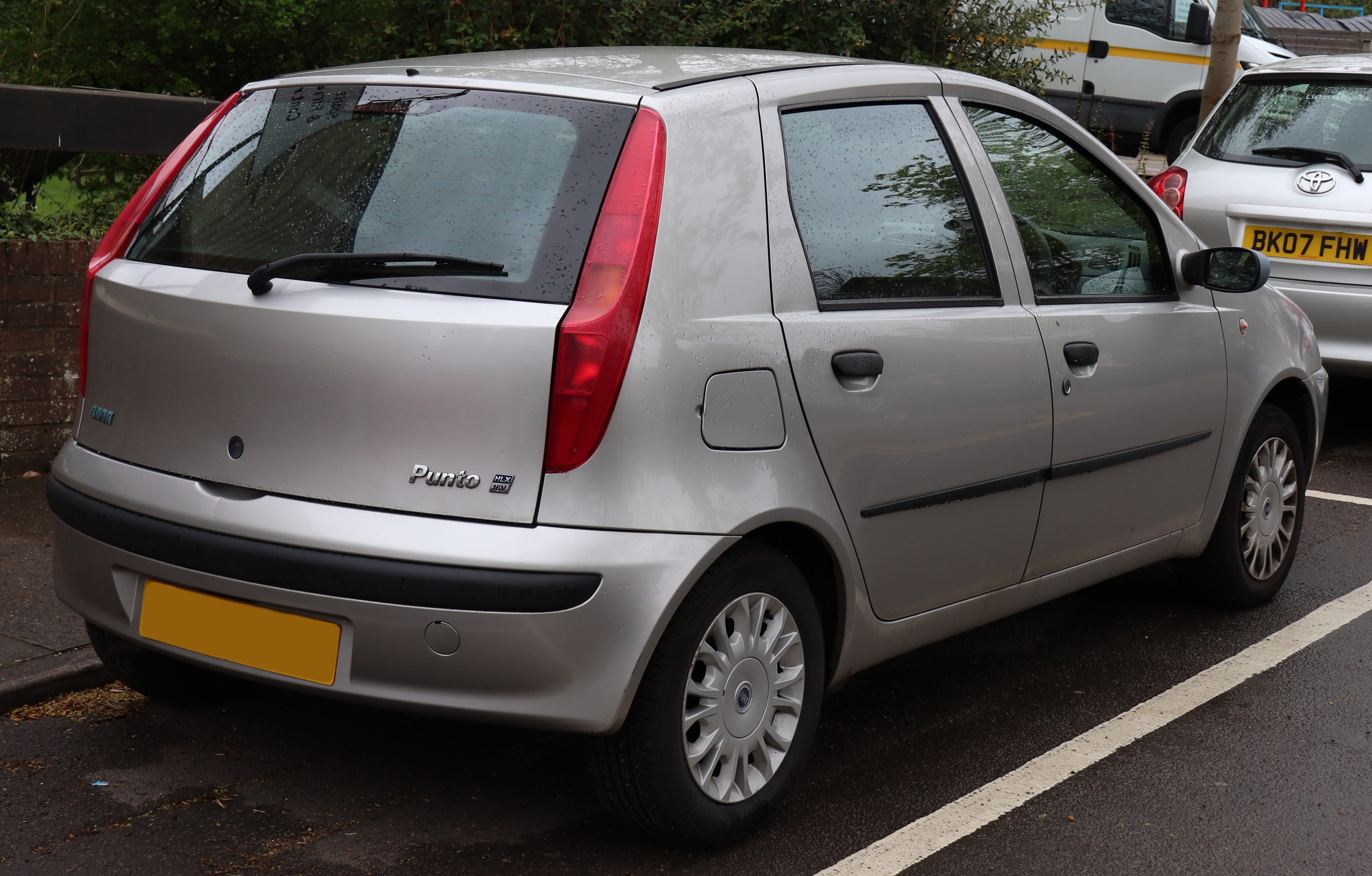
Rear (pre-facelift)

The second generation Punto codenamed Project 188, was launched in September 1999 at the Frankfurt Motor Show. The styling was all-new while retaining the original Punto's distinctive shape and design, while the chassis and interior were completely overhauled, with a new torsion beam rear suspension.

The new Punto also became the first Fiat in decades to carry the original round Fiat badge to celebrate Fiat's centenary.

At the launch event of the hatchback, the Fiat Wish concept car was also presented, which was hardtop convertible version of the Fiat Punto, very similar in styling with the Peugeot 206 CC. The model was conceived by Pininfarina to celebrate the centenary of Fiat.

=== Entry level ===
The 1.1 and 1.4 engines were discontinued due to emissions issues and the entry-level models had only a 1.2 petrol unit, with either 8 or 16 valves, giving 60 hp (45 kW) and 80 hp (60 kW) respectively, or a 1.9L diesel, with common rail injection and turbocharger or naturally aspired with mechanical injection.

=== Sporting versions ===
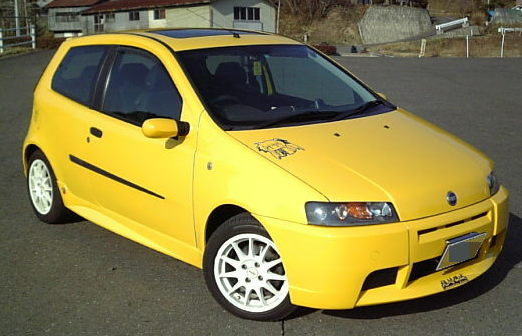
Fiat Punto HGT Abarth (2000)

Two sporty versions were offered. The 1.2 16 valve Sporting model with a six-speed manual, and the 1.8 HGT which could reach almost 130 mph (210 km/h). The 1.2 16V model also has a Speedgear CVT equipped variant (with a sequential manual shift mode consisting of six gears, seven for the Sporting model).

The 1.8 HGT accelerates from 0 to 60 in 8.6 seconds. It was considered a big improvement in handling over the Punto GT. The HGT was also available (in limited numbers) as an "HGT Abarth" which added deeper bumpers, rear spoiler, side skirts, new alloy wheels, and interior trim. The HGT Abarth had no technical improvements over the regular HGT.

=== Power steering ===
The second generation Punto has also adopted the Dualdrive electric power steering and came with two operation modes, using an electric motor, rather than a hydraulic pump driven by the engine.

This resulted in reduced fuel consumption and less environmental impact. It has a fuel economy of 5.6 L/100 km (50 mpg_{‑imp}; 42 mpg_{‑US}), urban and 3.9 L/100 km (72 mpg_{‑imp}; 60 mpg_{‑US}), extra urban for the 1.9 diesel. The 1.8 petrol does 8.8 L/100 km (32 mpg_{‑imp}; 27 mpg_{‑US}), urban and 5.3 L/100 km (53 mpg_{‑imp}; 44 mpg_{‑US}), extra urban.

=== Facelift ===
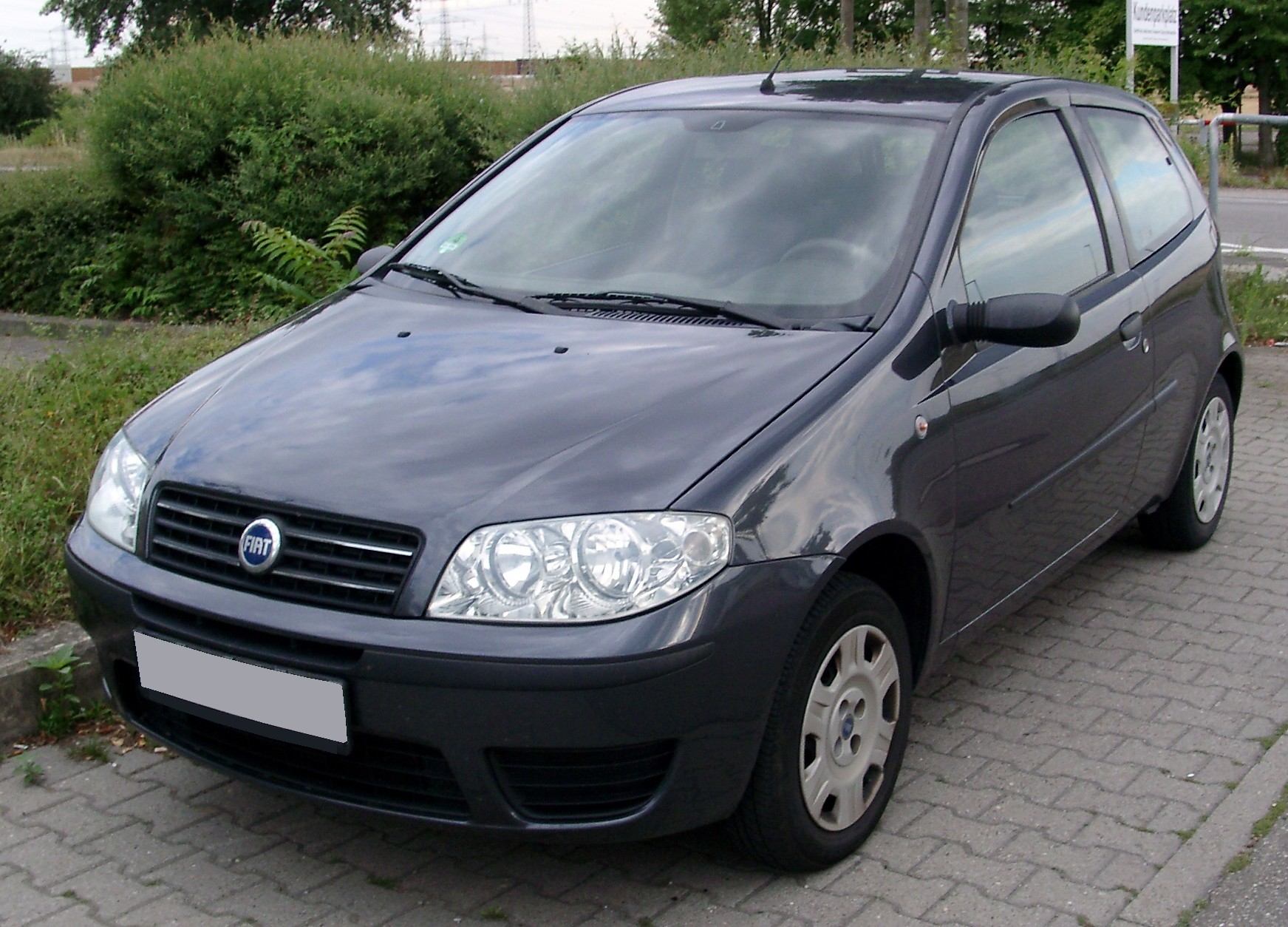

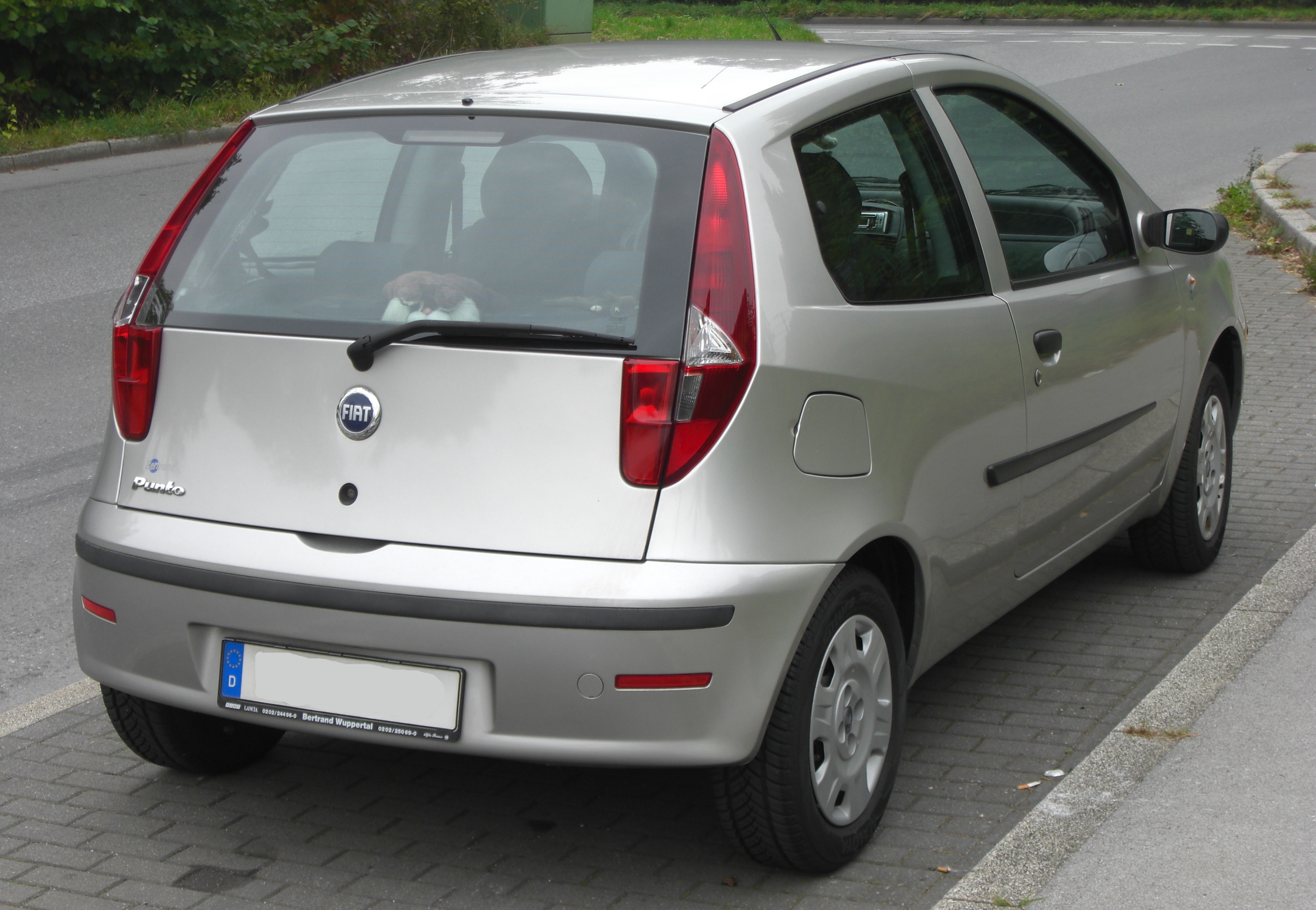
Facelift (2003)

At the beginning of 2003, Fiat celebrated the rollout of the 5,000,000th production Punto. During the same year, the second generation facelift brought further revisions to the platform, including extensive changes to the exterior styling and engines, partly due to changes in pedestrian safety regulations.

The round Fiat badge, found only on the bonnet of second-generation models, was introduced on the tailgate of the second generation facelift. On 1 June 2005, Fiat produced the 6,000,000th Punto at the Melfi plant.

Engine changes included a new 1.4 L 16v engine, alongside the staple 1.2 and 1.2 L 16v variants, and the introduction of two HGT versions, the 1.9 L MultiJet diesel engine and the 1.8 L 16v petrol engine, which could reach almost 130 mph (210 km/h) continued over from the pre-facelift version. There was an introduction also of the 1.3 L common rail diesel MultiJet engine.

==== Punto Classic ====
Despite the launch of the slightly larger Grande Punto at the end of 2005, the second generation Punto remained in production, marketed as the Punto Classic, and has been sold in many markets in addition to the newer versions. It was launched for the first time in Chile in 2007. It ended production in Italy in November 2010.

==== Zastava 10 ====
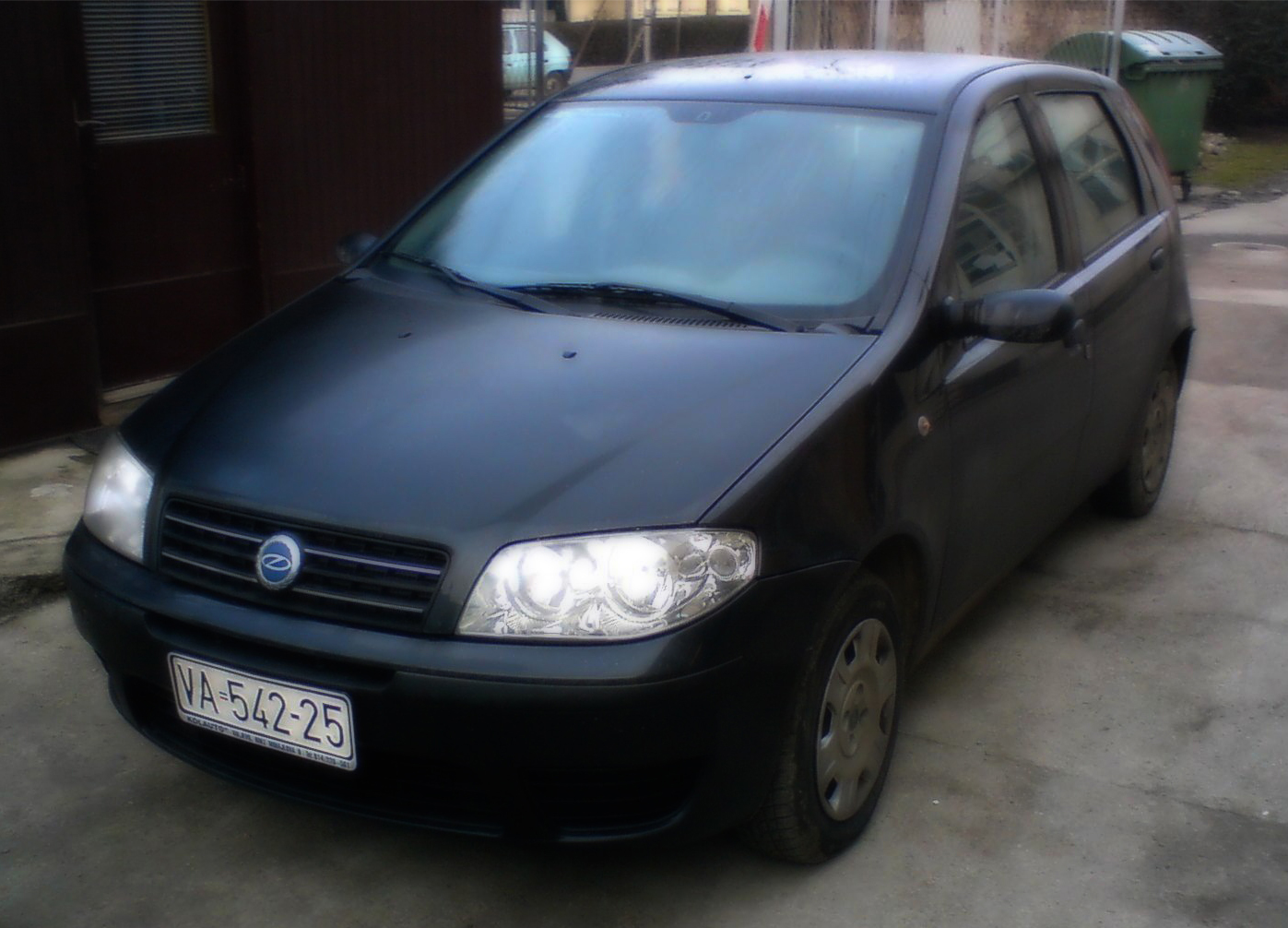
Zastava 10 (2006–2008)

In October 2005, Serbian automotive manufacturer Zastava reached an agreement with Fiat to assemble this version under licence in Kragujevac, Serbia, with the model name Zastava 10. After acquiring a majority stake in Zastava in the autumn of 2008, Fiat continued production of this vehicle under the Fiat Punto Classic name from March 2009.

Production was stopped in middle of 2011, and restarted in 2013, albeit very briefly. It has been available with the 1.2 litre petrol engine and later, also with the 1.3 litre diesel engine, the version of 2013 featured a newer, more modern engine.

=== Trim levels ===
The Punto was initially released in four different trim levels: S, SX, ELX and HLX, that were later renamed to Actual, Active, Dynamic and Eleganza. Three special versions of the three door hatchback were also available: Sporting, HGT and Abarth. The 'Sporting' had a six speed manual gearbox as standard.

The top-level included such features as ABS, front and side airbags, window bags, remote central locking, front power windows, electrical power steering, air conditioning, a trip computer with four functions, CD player, CD changer, alloy rims and fog lamps. Options such as navigation and burglar alarm were also offered.

After the facelift, it also received EBD, ESP with ASR and hill holder, climate control with double zone heating, heated seats, MP3 player and subwoofer (HGT only), rear parking sensors and cruise control as an option. A revised instrument panel with a larger display could now show the instant consumption too.

=== Engines ===
Four petrol engines with multi-point injection system were available, as well as one indirect injection diesel and three common rail turbocharged diesel engines with intercooler (JTD and MultiJet). The 1.8 16v and the 1.9 MultiJet engines were available only with the three-door version in the HGT trim level.

Engine	Displacement	Power	Torque	Top speed	0–100 km/h	Combined consumption	CO_{2} emissions	Production years
Petrol engines
1.2-L 8v	1,242 cc	44 kW (60 PS; 59 hp) at 5000 rpm	102 N⋅m (75 lb⋅ft) at 2500 rpm	155 km/h (96 mph)	14.3 s	5.7 L/100 km (50 mpg_{‑imp})	136 g/km	09/1999– 01/2010
1.2-L 16v	1,242 cc	59 kW (80 PS; 79 hp) at 5000 rpm	114 N⋅m (84 lb⋅ft) at 4000 rpm	172 km/h (107 mph)	11.4 s	6.0 L/100 km (47 mpg_{‑imp})	142 g/km	09/1999– 01/2006
1.4-L 16v	1,368 cc	70 kW (95 PS; 94 hp) at 5800 rpm	128 N⋅m (94 lb⋅ft) at 4500 rpm	178 km/h (111 mph)	9.9 s	6.1 L/100 km (46 mpg_{‑imp})	145 g/km	06/2003– 01/2006
1.8-L 16v	1,747 cc	96 kW (131 PS; 129 hp) at 6300 rpm	164 N⋅m (121 lb⋅ft) at 4300 rpm	205 km/h (127 mph)	8.6 s	8.3 L/100 km (34 mpg_{‑imp})	197 g/km	09/1999– 01/2006
Diesel engines
1.2-L MultiJet 16v	1,248 cc	51 kW (69 PS; 68 hp) at 4000 rpm	180 N⋅m (133 lb⋅ft) at 1750 rpm	164 km/h (102 mph)	13.4 s	4.5 L/100 km (63 mpg_{‑imp})	119 g/km	06/2003– 01/2006
1.9-L D 8v	1,910 cc	44 kW (60 PS; 59 hp) at 4500 rpm	118 N⋅m (87 lb⋅ft) at 2250 rpm	155 km/h (96 mph)	15.0 s	5.7 L/100 km (50 mpg_{‑imp})	150 g/km	09/1999– 06/2003
1.9-L JTD 8v	1,910 cc	59 kW (80 PS; 79 hp) at 3000 rpm (Note: Also with 63 kW (86 PS; 84 hp) from 04/2002.)	196 N⋅m (145 lb⋅ft) at 1500 rpm	170 km/h (106 mph) (Note: 173 km/h (107 mph) from 06/2003.)	12.2 s	4.9 L/100 km (58 mpg_{‑imp})	130 g/km	09/1999– 01/2006
1.9-L JTD 8v	1,910 cc	63 kW (86 PS; 84 hp) at 3000 rpm (Note: Also with 63 kW (86 PS; 84 hp) from 04/2002.)	200 N⋅m (148 lb⋅ft) at 1500 rpm	173 km/h (107 mph) (Note: 173 km/h (107 mph) from 06/2003.)	11.5 s	4.9 L/100 km (58 mpg_{‑imp})	130 g/km	2002– 01/2006
1.9-L MultiJet 8v	1,910 cc	74 kW (101 PS; 99 hp) at 4000 rpm	260 N⋅m (192 lb⋅ft) at 1750 rpm	185 km/h (115 mph)	9.6 s	5.3 L/100 km (53 mpg_{‑imp})	140 g/km	06/2003– 01/2005

== Third generation (Type 199; 2005) ==
Third generation
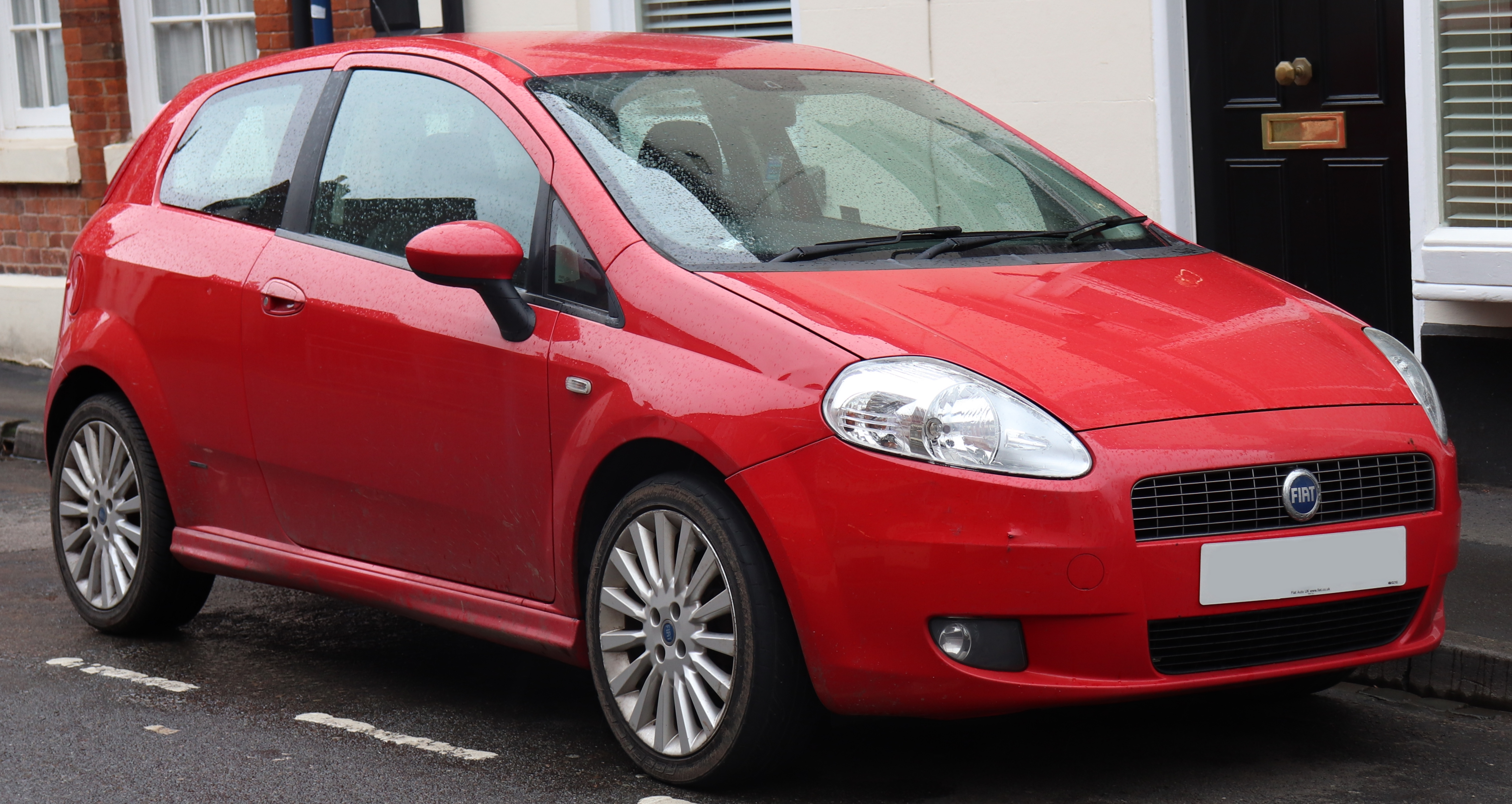

Overview
- Model code: 199
- Also called: Fiat Grande Punto; Fiat Avventura (India, crossover version); Fiat Urban Cross (India, crossover version)
- Production: November 2004–2018 (Europe); 2007–2017 (South America); 2008–2018 (India)
- Assembly: Italy: Melfi, Potenza; Mirafiori, Turin; Brazil: Betim; India: Ranjangaon, Pune (Fiat India)
- Designer: Giorgetto Giugiaro at Italdesign

Body and chassis
- Class: Supermini (B)
- Body style: 3/5-door hatchback 3-door panel van
- Layout: Front-engine, front-wheel drive
- Platform: SCCS platform
- Related: Opel Corsa D Alfa Romeo MiTo; Fiat Linea; Fiat Fiorino

Powertrain
- Engine: petrol: 0.9 L TwinAir turbo I2; 1.2 L Fire I4; 1.4 L Fire I4; 1.4 L Fire Flex Flexfuel I4; 1.4 L Fire turbo I4; 1.4 L Multiair I4; 1.4 L Multiair turbo I4; 1.6 L E.torQ Flexfuel I4; 1.8 L E.torQ Flexfuel I4; 1.8 L Ecotec X18XE I4; CNG: 1.4 L Fire Natural Power I4; diesel: 1.3 L Multijet I4; 1.6 L Multijet I4; 1.9 L Multijet I4
- Transmission: 5/6-speed manual 5-speed automated manual

Dimensions
- Wheelbase: 2,510 mm (98.8 in)
- Length: 4,030 mm (158.7 in) (2005–2011); 4,065 mm (160.0 in) (2012–2018)
- Width: 1,687 mm (66.4 in)
- Height: 1,490 mm (58.7 in)
- Curb weight: 1,015–1,040 kg (2,238–2,293 lb)

Chronology
- Predecessor: Fiat Punto
- Successor: Fiat Grande Panda (Europe); Fiat Argo (South America)

The Grande Punto, codenamed Project 199, was unveiled at the 2005 Frankfurt Motor Show and went on sale later on that year. Again styled by Giugiaro, the car is based on the Fiat Small platform developed in joint venture with Opel-General Motors.

Whilst the model shares some of its name with the previous Punto, a large number of its components are new, including a new chassis and body shell.

The engines are the Fiat 1.2 8v Fire (65 PS), a new 1.4 8v Fire (77 PS) and the 1.4 16v StarJet (95 PS). Four MultiJet diesel engines are also available: two 1.3 16v units (75 PS (55 kW) and 90 PS (66 kW), the latter with a variable geometry turbocharger) and two 1.9 with 120 PS (88 kW) and 130 PS (96 kW), all of them with diesel particulate filter. The 1.9 diesel was replaced with the new 1.6 MultiJet starting the end of 2008.

All the engines are Euro IV compliant. In 2007, a new 1.4 16v T-Jet turbocharged petrol engine, 120 PS (88 kW), became available. At the 2007 Frankfurt Motor Show, Fiat introduced 155 PS (114 kW) an Abarth version by Abarth & C S.p.A. It was branded as an Abarth rather than Fiat.

The car's nose, headlights and front grille look reminiscent of the Maserati Coupé (both were designed by Giorgetto Giugiaro of ItalDesign).

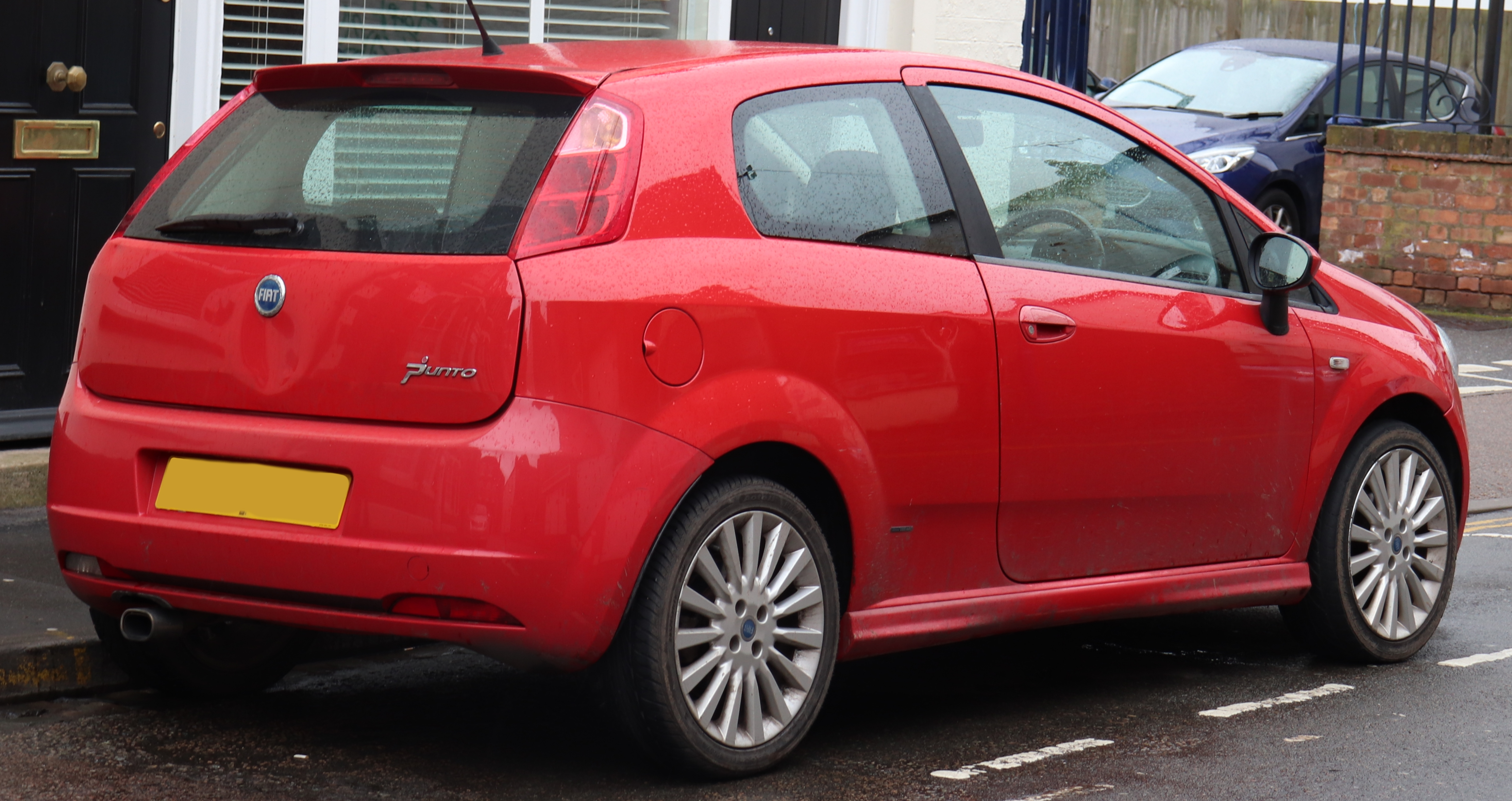
Rear view (3-door)

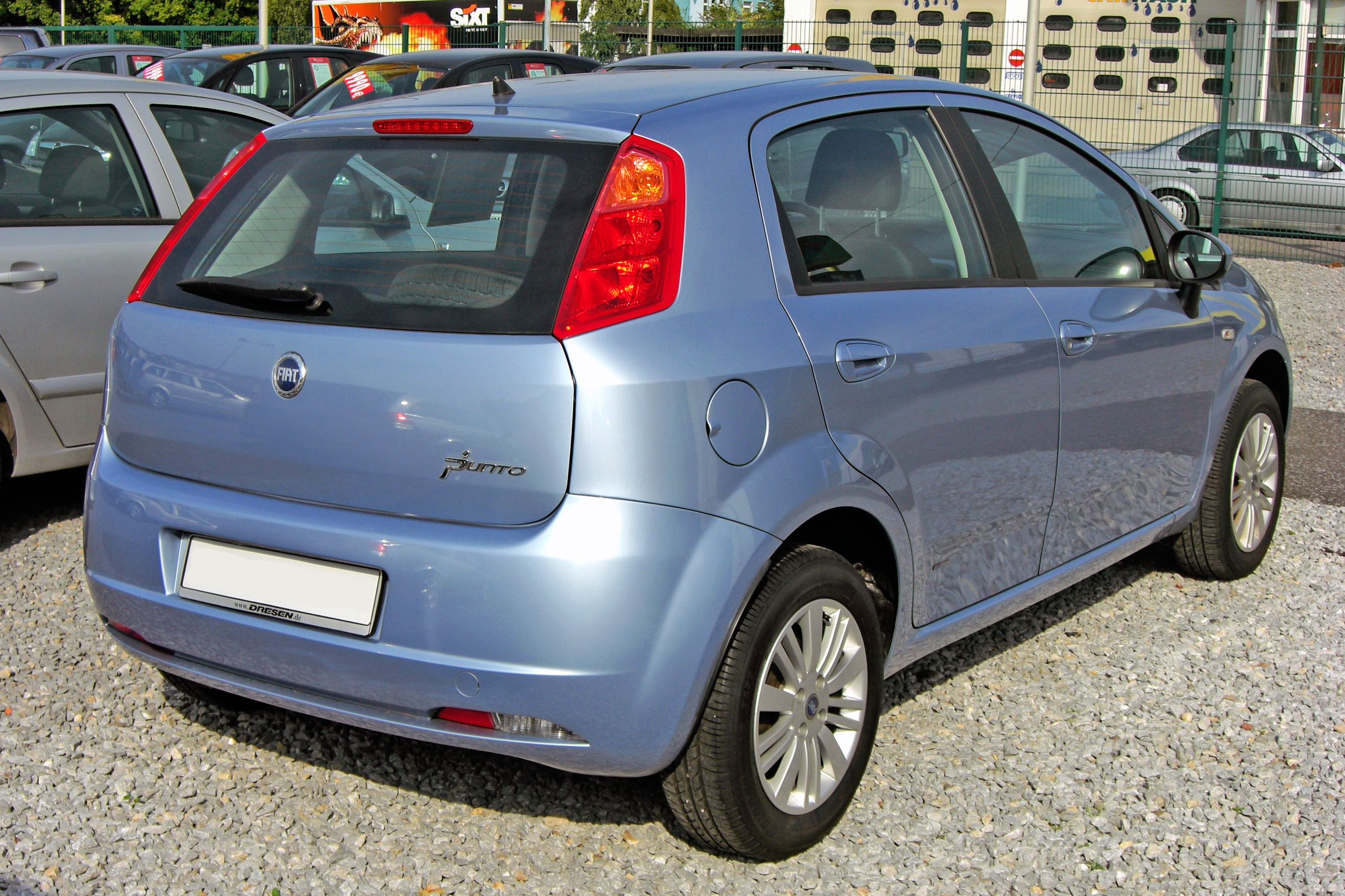
Rear view (5-door)

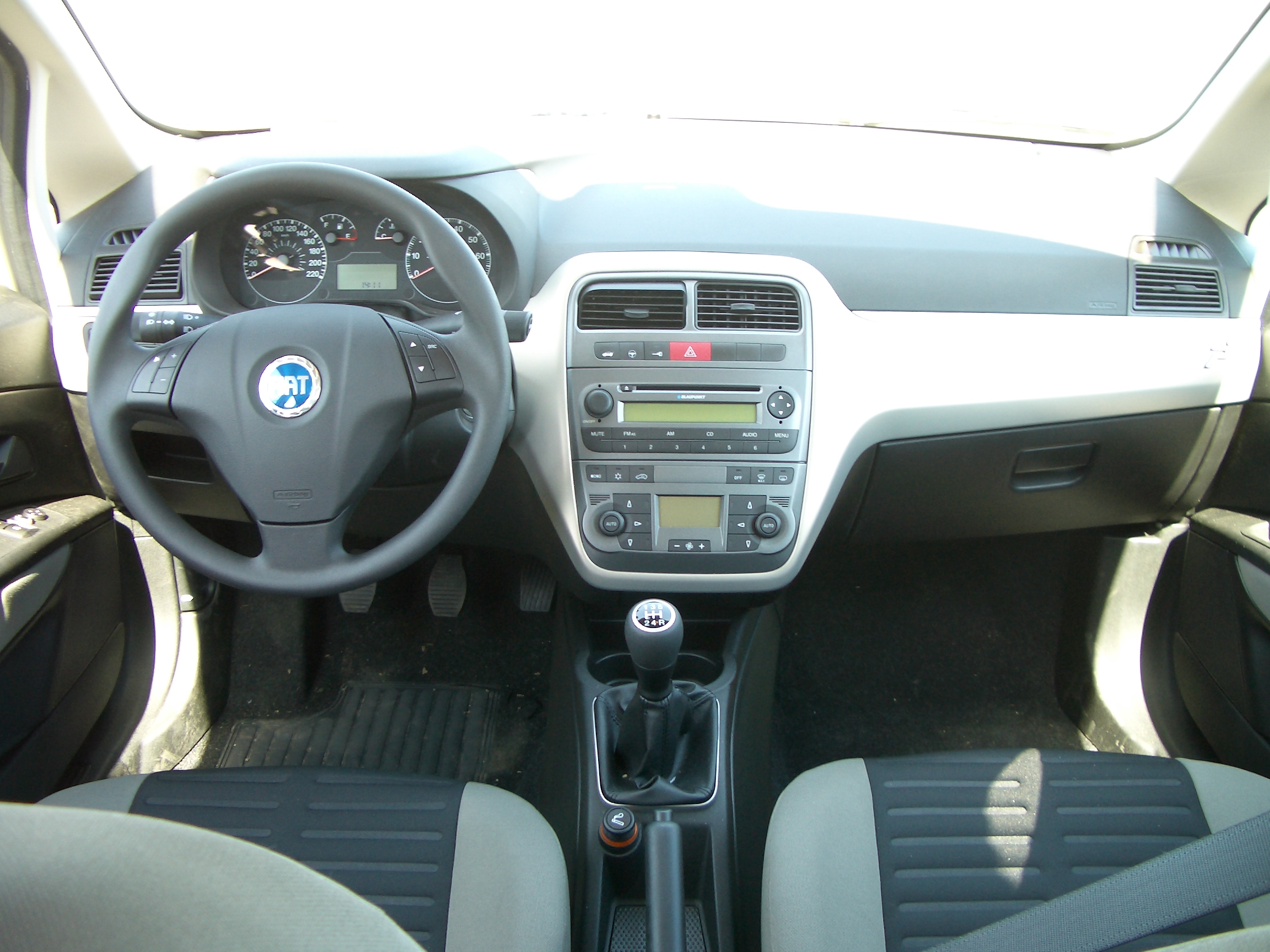
Interior

=== Other markets ===
In Australia, Fiat introduced the Grande Punto in July 2006, sold only as the Punto; it was the first Fiat to be sold in Australia since 1989. In 2009, the Punto was discontinued in Australia, due to slow sales. The car was reintroduced in 2013 after Fiat began factory distribution in Australia, the car was repriced at a much lower price, that was more in keeping with its rivals. In September 2015, the Punto was once again pulled from the Australian market due to slow sales.

It was launched in Mexico in November 2006. The Grande Punto is placed above the Fiat Palio in the Mexican Fiat car lineup. Initially it was sold with the 1.4 16v StarJet 95 PS (70 kW) engine with six speed manual gearbox in five door Dynamic and three door Sport trims. In December 2007, the 1.4 16v T-Jet 120 PS (88 kW) variant was launched.

The Grande Punto also went on sale in South Africa in 2006, replacing the previous generation.

The Grande Punto was launched in India during the Delhi Auto Expo in January 2008, with sales starting in June 2009. The Punto for the Indian market was manufactured by the Fiat / Tata Motors joint venture Fiat India Automobiles Ltd (FIAL) in a new plant in Ranjangaon, Maharashtra and based on the same 310 project of the Brazilian Punto.

A related sedan car, the Fiat Linea, was launched in the beginning of 2007 to replace the ageing Fiat Marea. It is built on an extended version of the Grande Punto's chassis, with a total length of 4,560 mm (179.5 in), making it part of the superior small family car segment.

=== Latin America ===
The Italian made Grande Punto was launched in Chile and the Dominican Republic in petrol and diesel versions.

In the rest of South America, the Brazilian built Grande Punto (called only Punto) was launched in August 2007. Codenamed Project 310, it is produced in the factory of Betim, Minas Gerais, Brazil. The chassis is an adaptation of the Fiat Palio, a lower cost compact. Levels of safety were not maintained (airbags and ABS are optional on lower trim levels, and the highest one has only two airbags as standard), but the ride comfort is said to be the same.

The five door version was the only one available in the Brazilian line, and there were no plans for a two-door version (in Brazil, two door vehicles are only accepted for cheaper cars). The engines available at launch were the 85 PS (63 kW) 1.4 Fire 8v and the 115 PS (85 kW) 1.8 Ecotec-Family 1 X18XE engine that comes from GM-Fiat/Powertrain, and later the 1.4 Fire 16v TurboJet, also available for the Linea.

For the model of 2011, there were added the new E.TorQ engines 1.6 16v and 1.8 16v. Produced by Fiat Powertrain Technologies, they were based on the discontinued Tritec engines. All non Turbo petrol models produced in Brazil are flex-fuel.

==== Differences between Brazilian version and Italian version ====
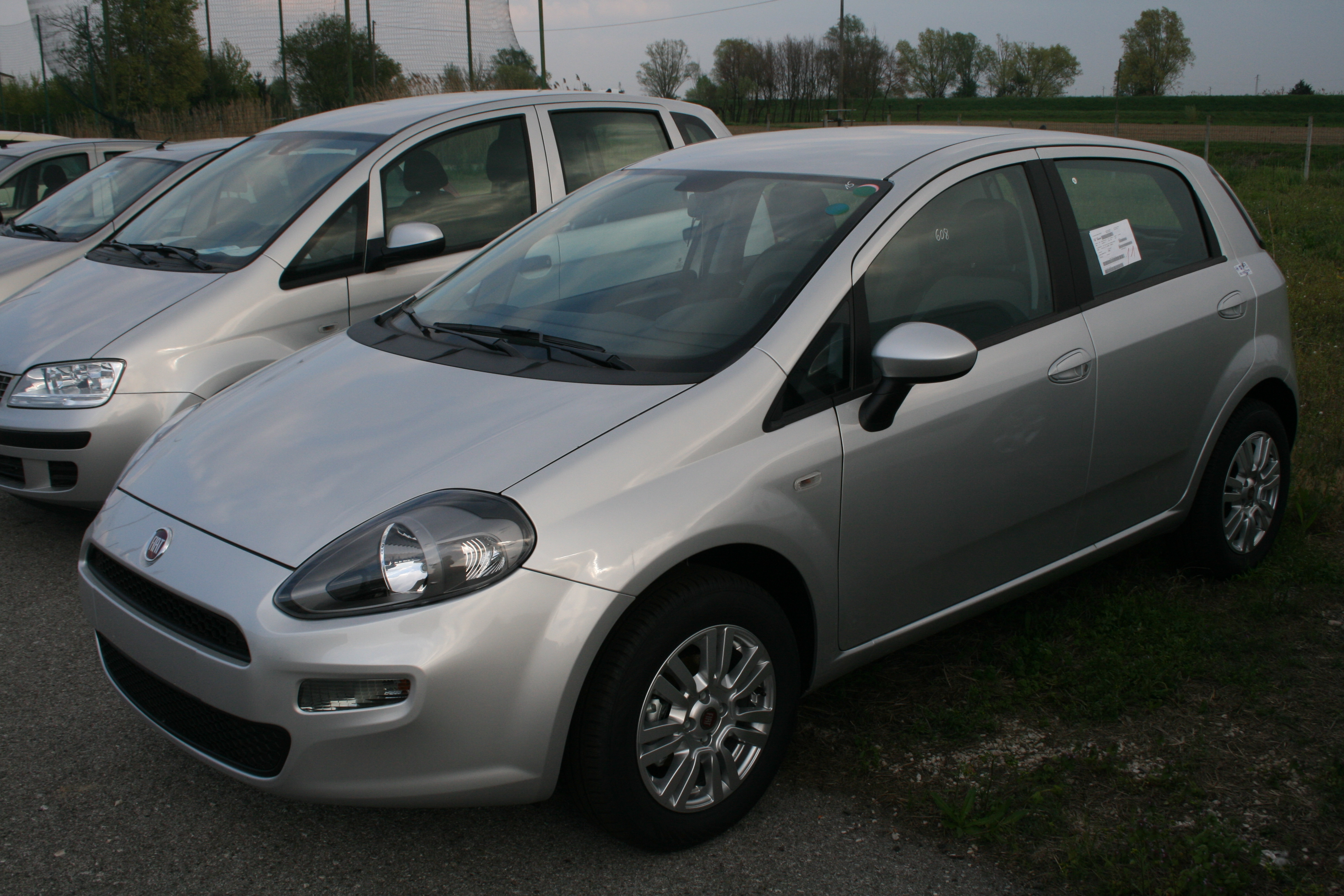
The Italian-built model featured larger door mirrors, less rounded body styling, and side indicators. It also had a slightly lower overall height, giving it a more streamlined appearance.

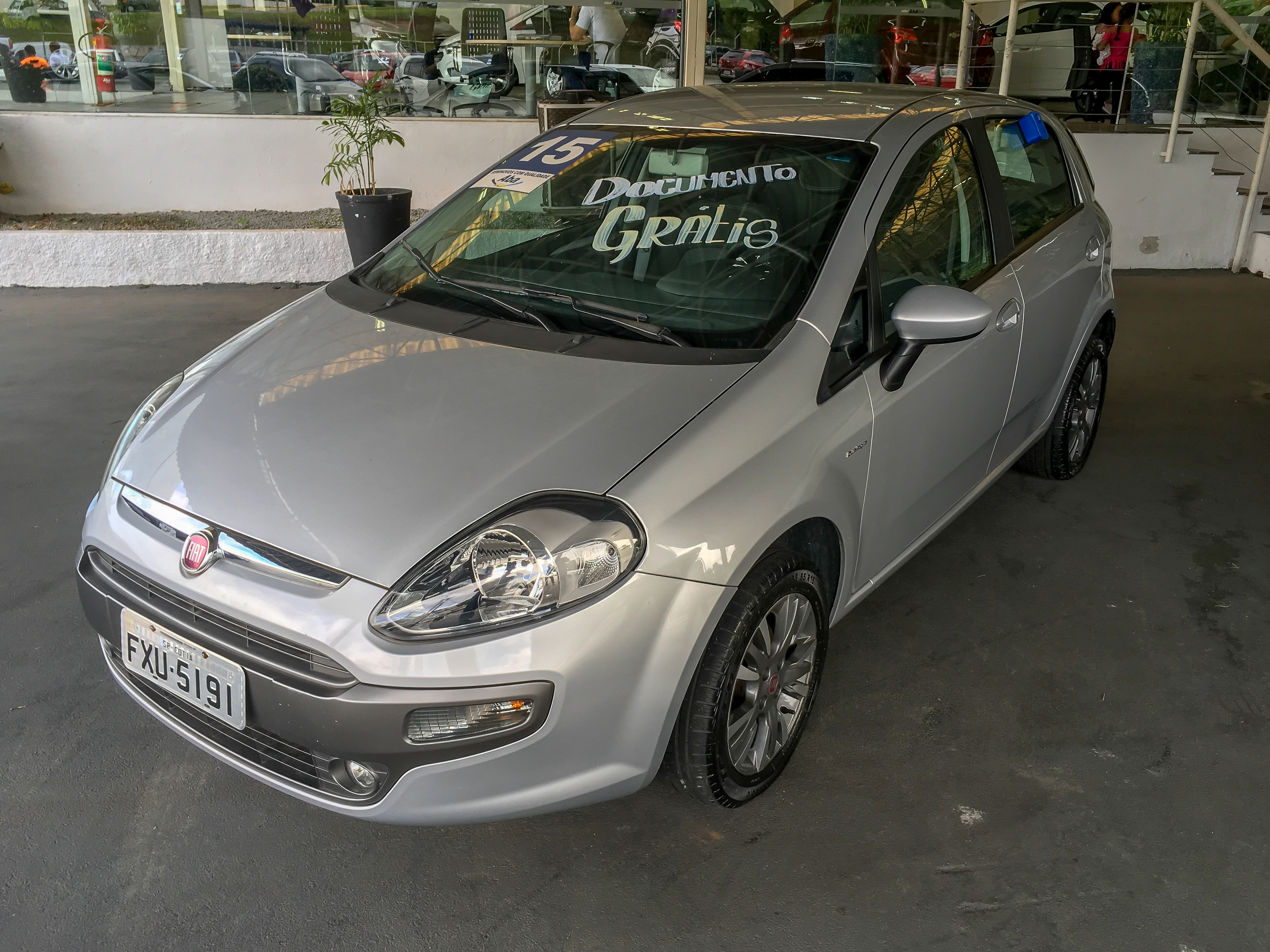
The Brazilian-built model featured smaller door mirrors, black inner headlamp housings, and no side indicators. It also had a slightly taller body and rounded styling.

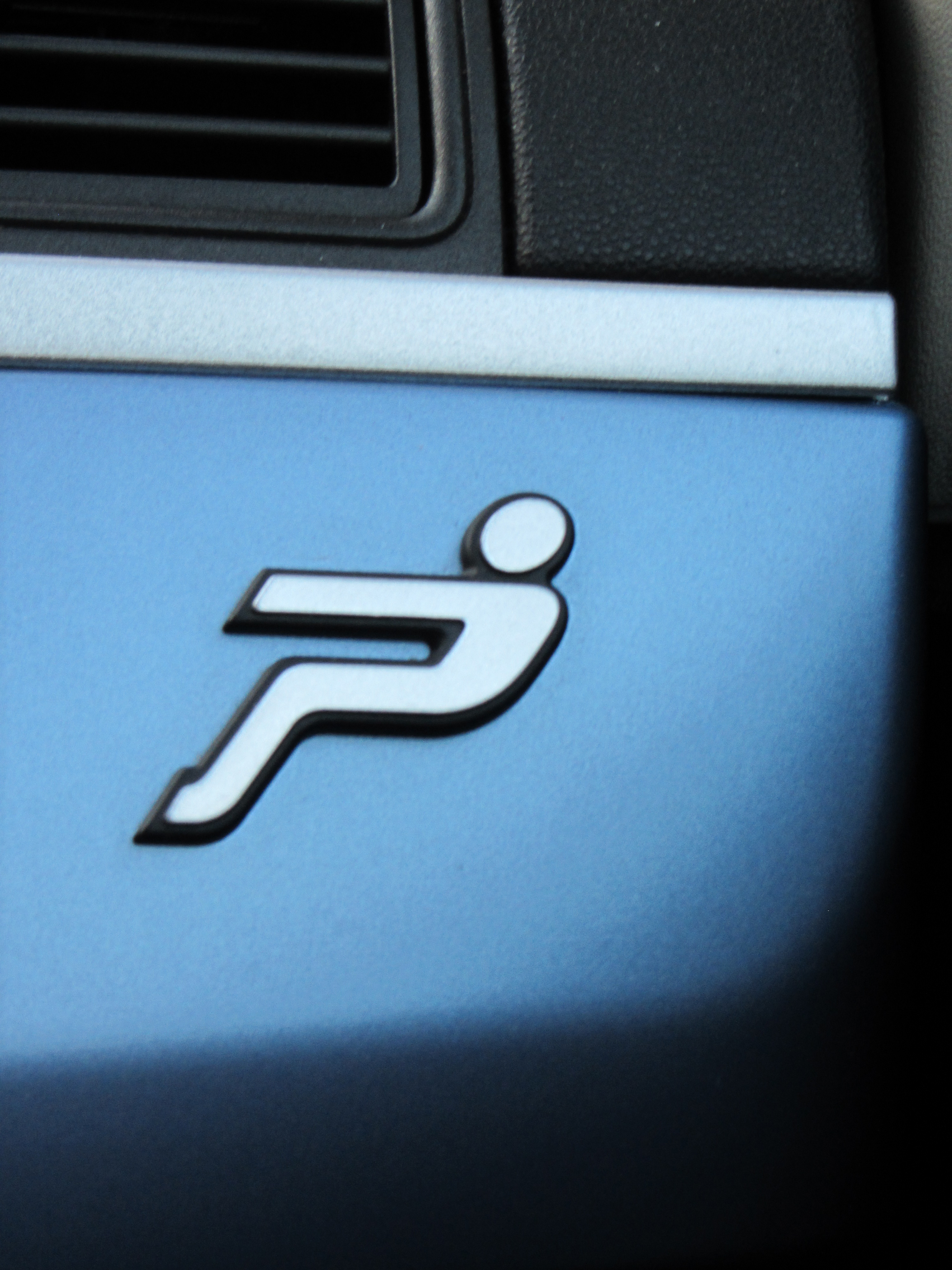
Mr. Dot, Grande Punto's logo forming the letter P and representing a seated person driving

=== Safety ===
The Grande Punto was awarded with five stars in the Euro NCAP crash test for passenger protection, and three stars certification for pedestrian safety. The most powerful engines have electronic stability program and anti slip regulation fitted as standard, and it is an optional extra on some of the lower powered engines.

However, in a later test in December 2017, the car was retested with a zero star rating by Euro NCAP. It scored 51% for its protection of adult occupants, with chest protection for the rear passenger deemed weak and whiplash protection for the front passengers deemed poor. It scored 43% for its protection of child occupants, doing better at protecting the dummy representing an analogue of a six-year-old child than it did at protecting the dummy representing an analogue of a ten-year-old child and with the organisation noting that it was unclear whether or not the front-passenger airbag was activated. It scored 52% for pedestrian protection, mostly doing badly at protecting a struck pedestrian's head but generally doing well at protecting their legs and pelvis. It scored 0% for safety assist features, with the organisation noting that an unplugged-seatbelt warning was only standard equipment for the driver's seat. One of the given reasons for this is the fact that the third generation Punto was launched in 2005, making the car a twelve year old model, whose safety standards were never actually updated.

ANCAP test results* Fiat Punto (2006)
Test	Score
Overall	5 /5 stars
Frontal offset	13.60/16
Side impact	15.63/16
Pole	2/2
Seat belt reminders	2/3
Whiplash protection	Not Assessed
Pedestrian protection	Adequate
Electronic stability control	Not Assessed

=== Abarth Grande Punto (2007–2010) ===
The first car from the newly created (2007) Fiat owned Abarth & C. S.p.A., the Abarth Grande Punto differs significantly from its donor car.

Initially the Abarth Grande Punto was released with a 150 PS (155 PS when using 97 RON fuel) 1.4 turbo engine, but from 2008, there was available an Essesse kit, which could be installed at official Abarth service centres rather than in the factory. Amongst various refinements included uprated brakes and suspension, the Essesse kit provided an uprated power output of 180 hp (134 kW).

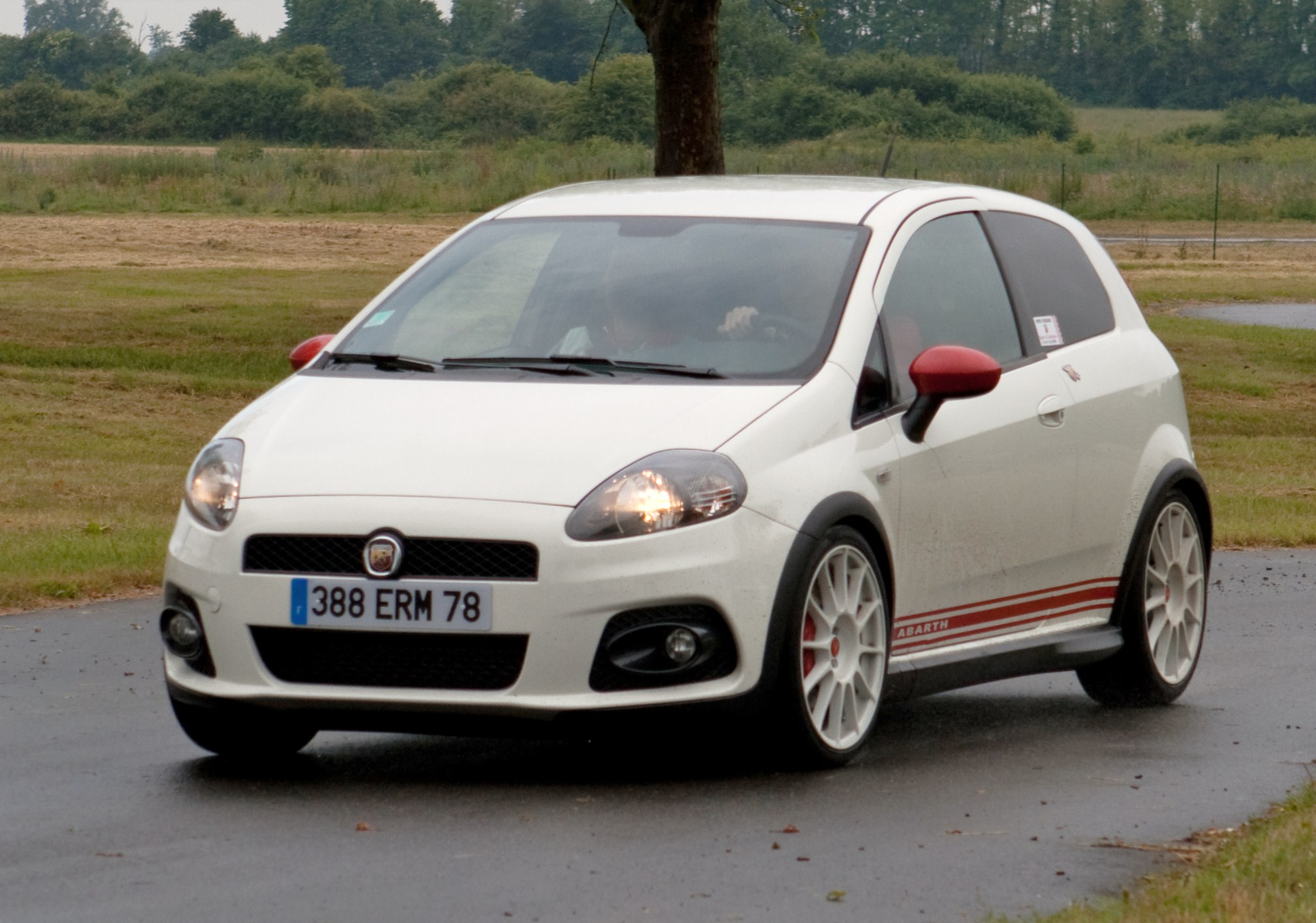
Abarth Grande Punto

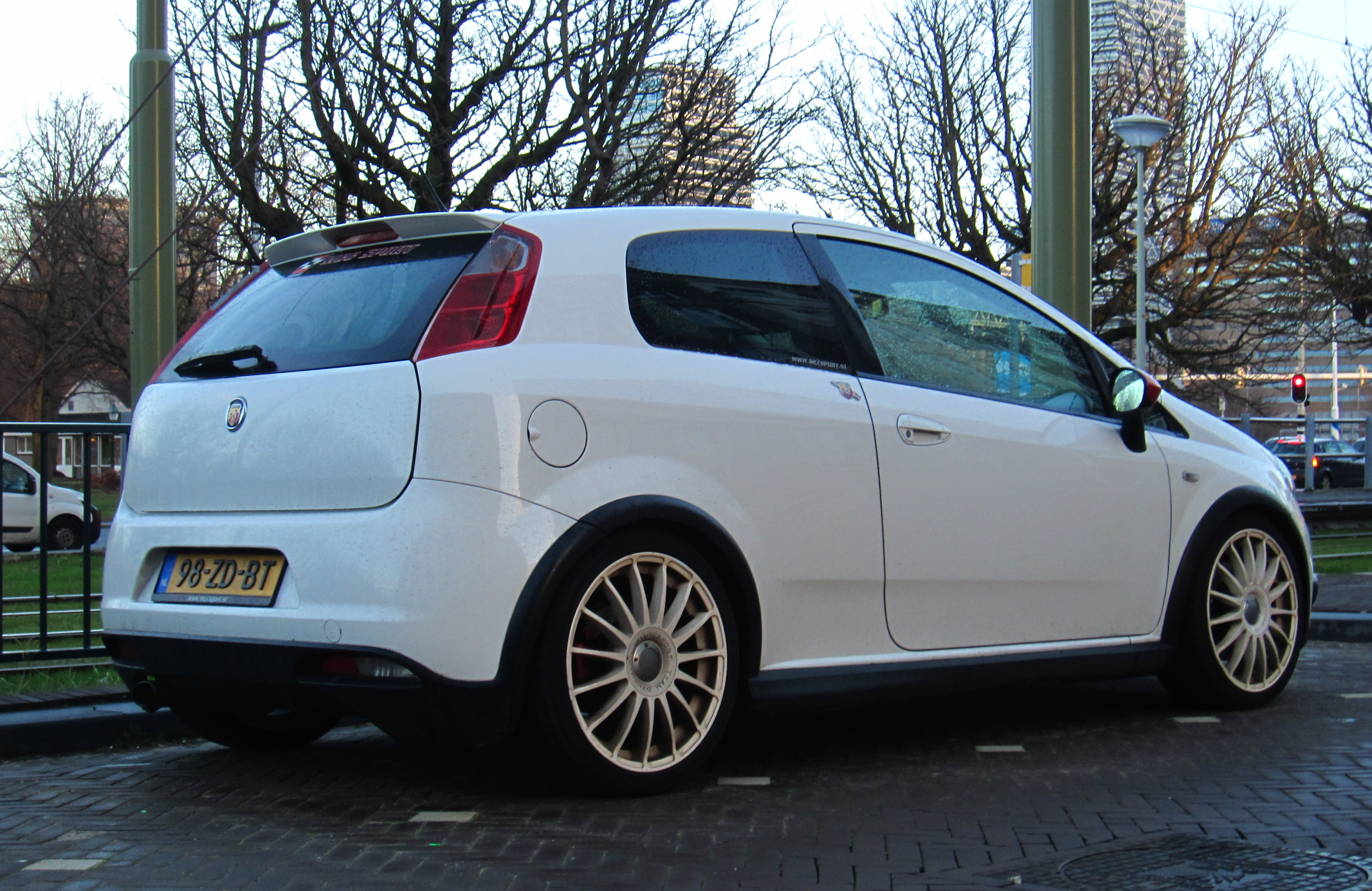
Rear view

=== 2009 facelift (Punto Evo) ===
The Punto Evo, a facelift version of the Grande Punto, was presented in September 2009 at the Frankfurt Motor Show. It received a new front end, in addition to revised rear lights, and a new interior. It has two new engines, a 1.3 L second generation Multijet diesel and a 1.4 L petrol engine with the MultiAir technology. It also features a new navigation system integrated to the Blue&Me system called Blue&Me–TomTom.

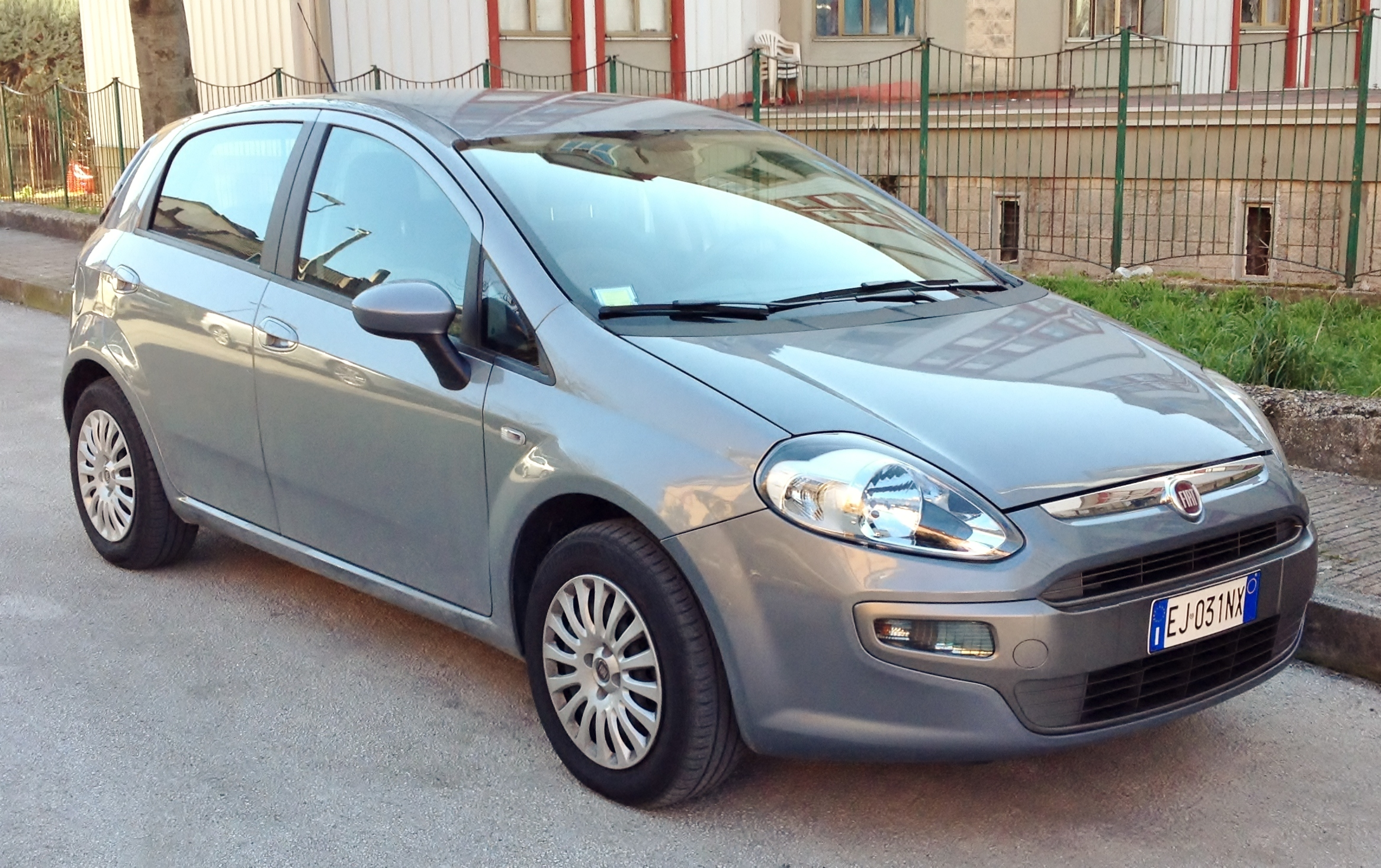
Fiat Punto Evo

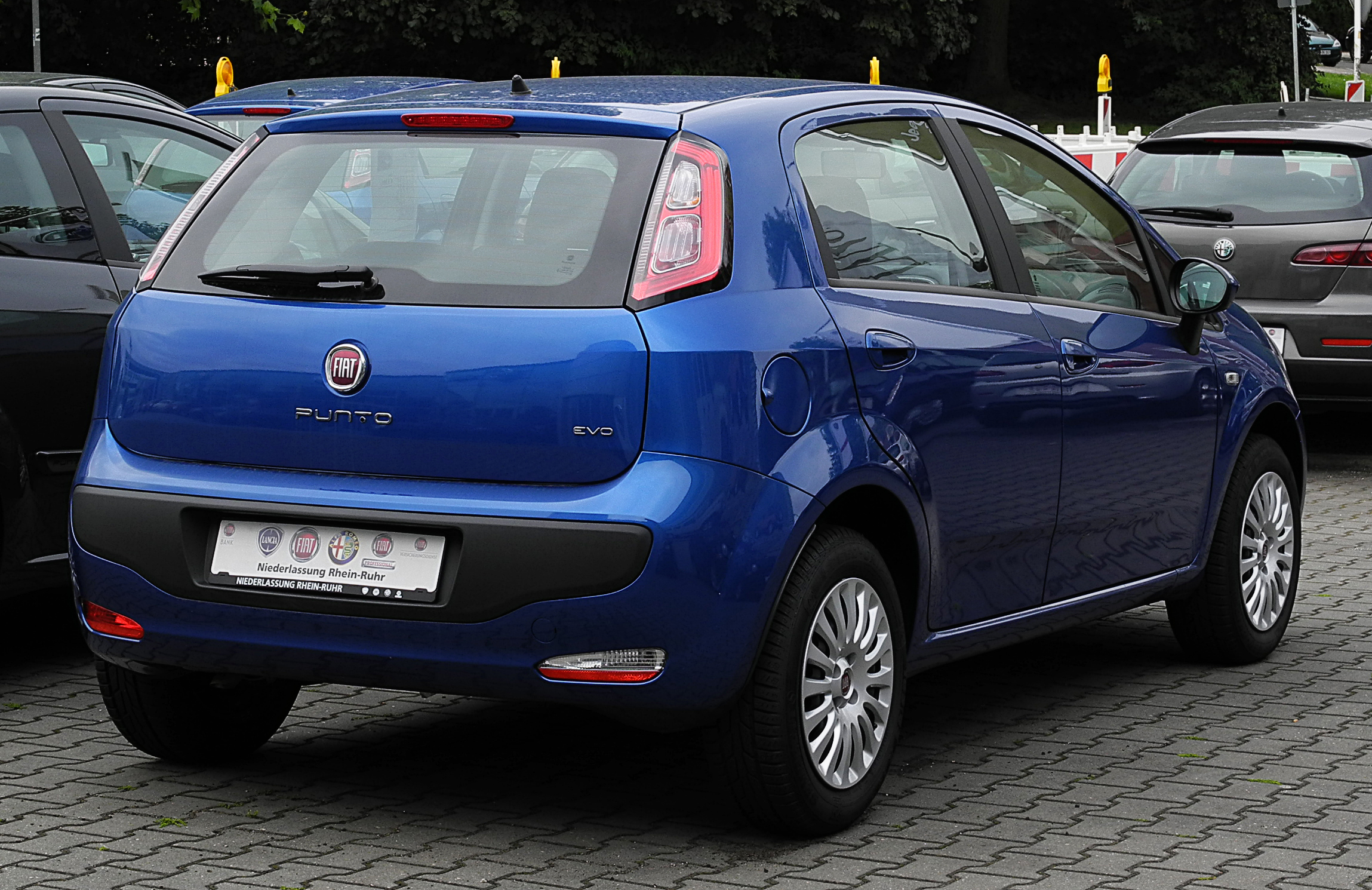
Rear view

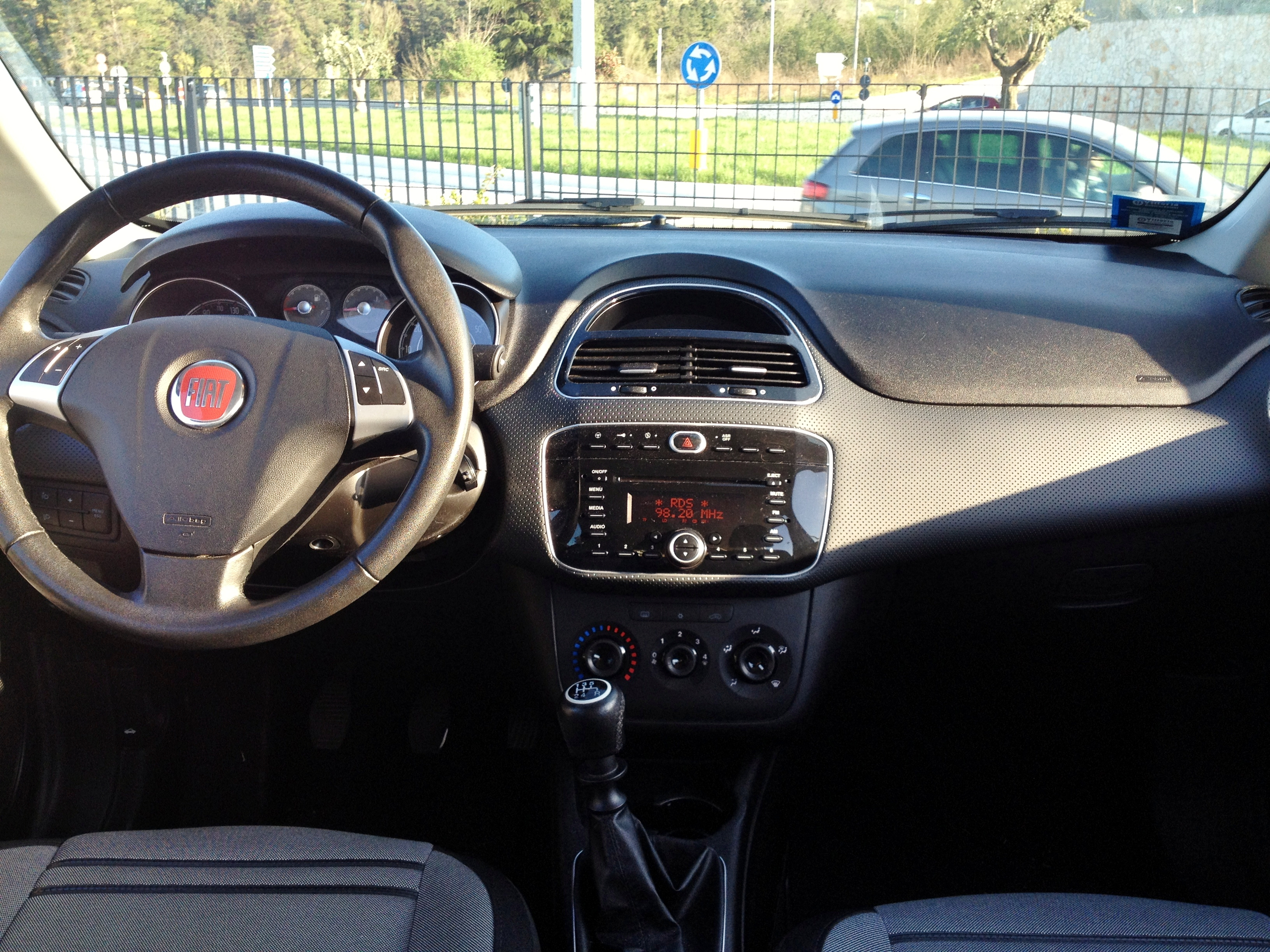
Interior

==== Abarth Punto Evo (2010–2015) ====
The Abarth Punto Evo was shown at 2010 Geneva Motor Show. It has a 165 PS (121 kW; 163 hp) 1,368 cc (1.4 L) MultiAir Turbo inline-four engine. The top speed is 213 km/h (132 mph) and acceleration from 0 to 100 km/h (62 mph) takes 7.5 seconds.

A new Esseesse version was released in 2011, which was an optional upgrade that improved performance, with a 0–100 km/h (62 mph) time of 7.3 seconds. The Abarth Punto Evo was discontinued in 2015, after slow sales.

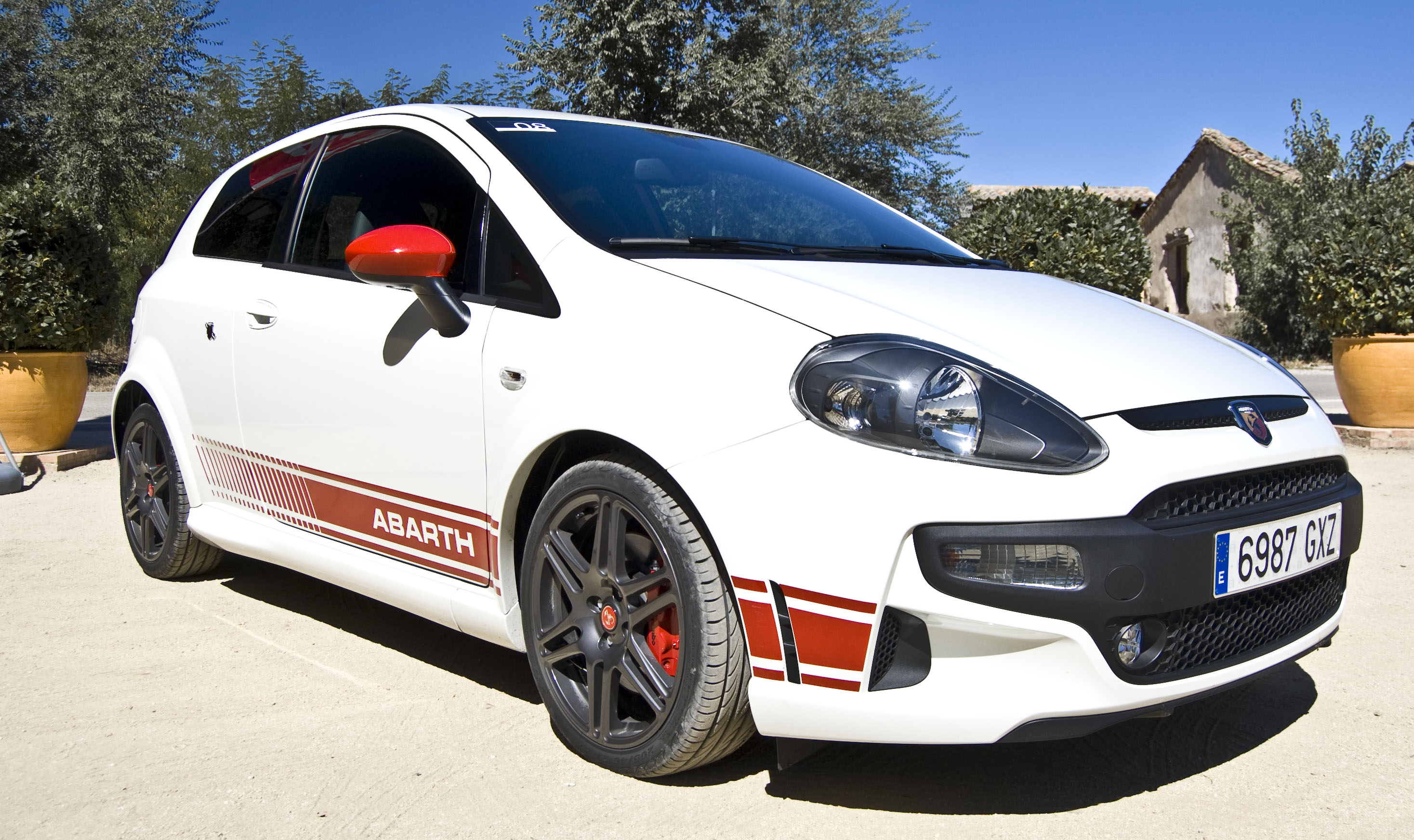
Abarth Punto Evo

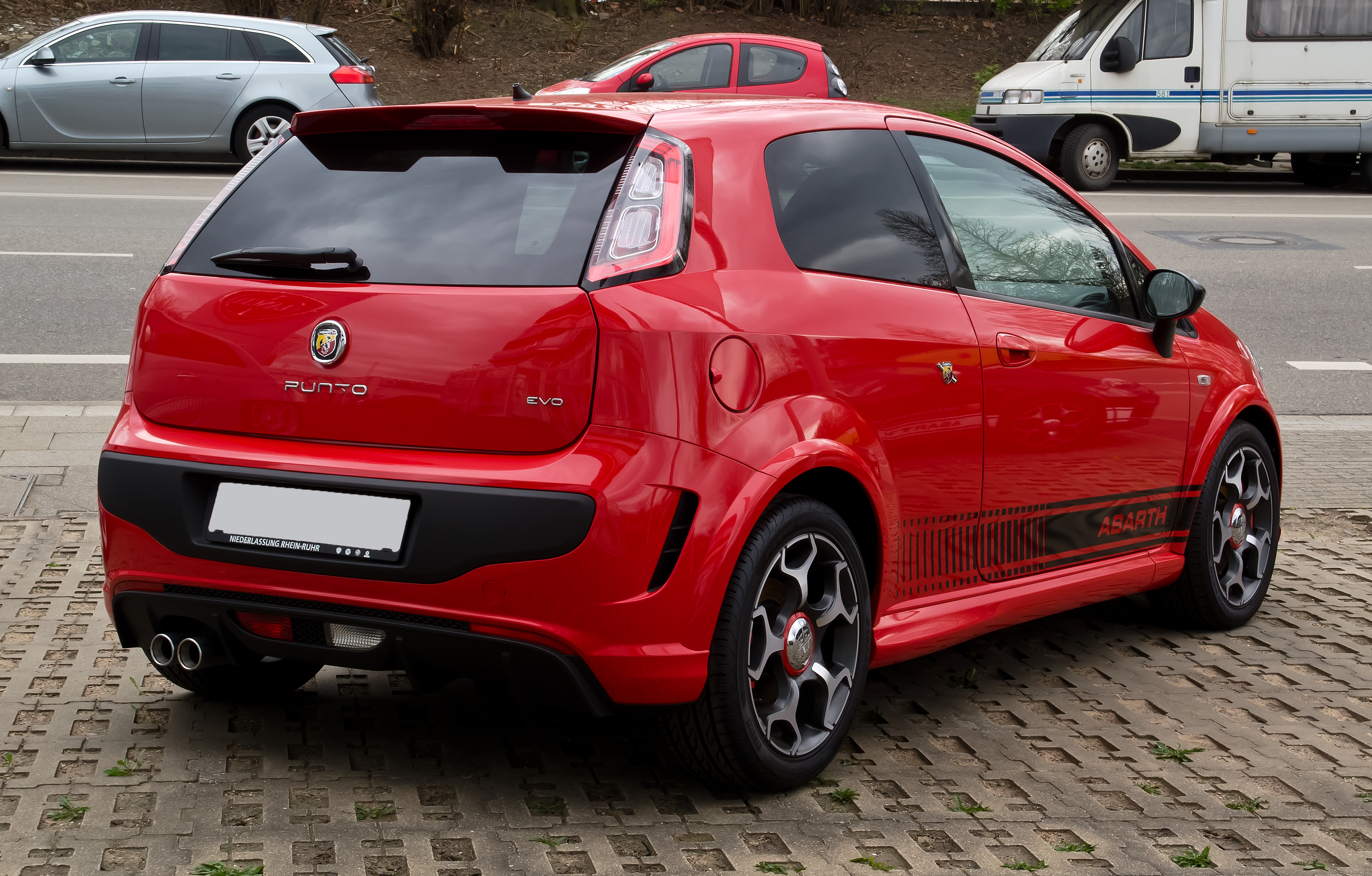
Rear view

=== 2012 facelift ===
Fiat introduced the 2012 Punto in September 2011 at the Frankfurt Motor Show, as a facelifted version of the Punto Evo that reintroduced the Punto nomenclature (without Grande or Evo). The facelift was consisted of slighter tweaks than changing from Grande Punto to Punto Evo, keeping the revised rear lights and interior of the 2009 Punto Evo, but not on the base 'Pop' trim level which reverted to the older Grande Punto interior.

In October 2014, Top Gear Magazine placed the Punto Pop 1.2 liter 8v 69 on its list of The Worst Cars You Can Buy Right Now, describing the car as "An outclassed elderly supermini that kicks out 126 g/km yet takes 14.4 secs to wheeze to 62 mph, and it costs more than £10k."

Production of the three-door version ended in 2015, leaving only the five-door version available in Europe.

In June 2016, Fiat introduced the new Techno Pack with the 5-inch touchscreen infotainment system and cruise control. Production of the Punto ended on 7 August 2018, with no direct successor being announced. However, it continued to be produced in India for an additional three months before production ended in November of that year.

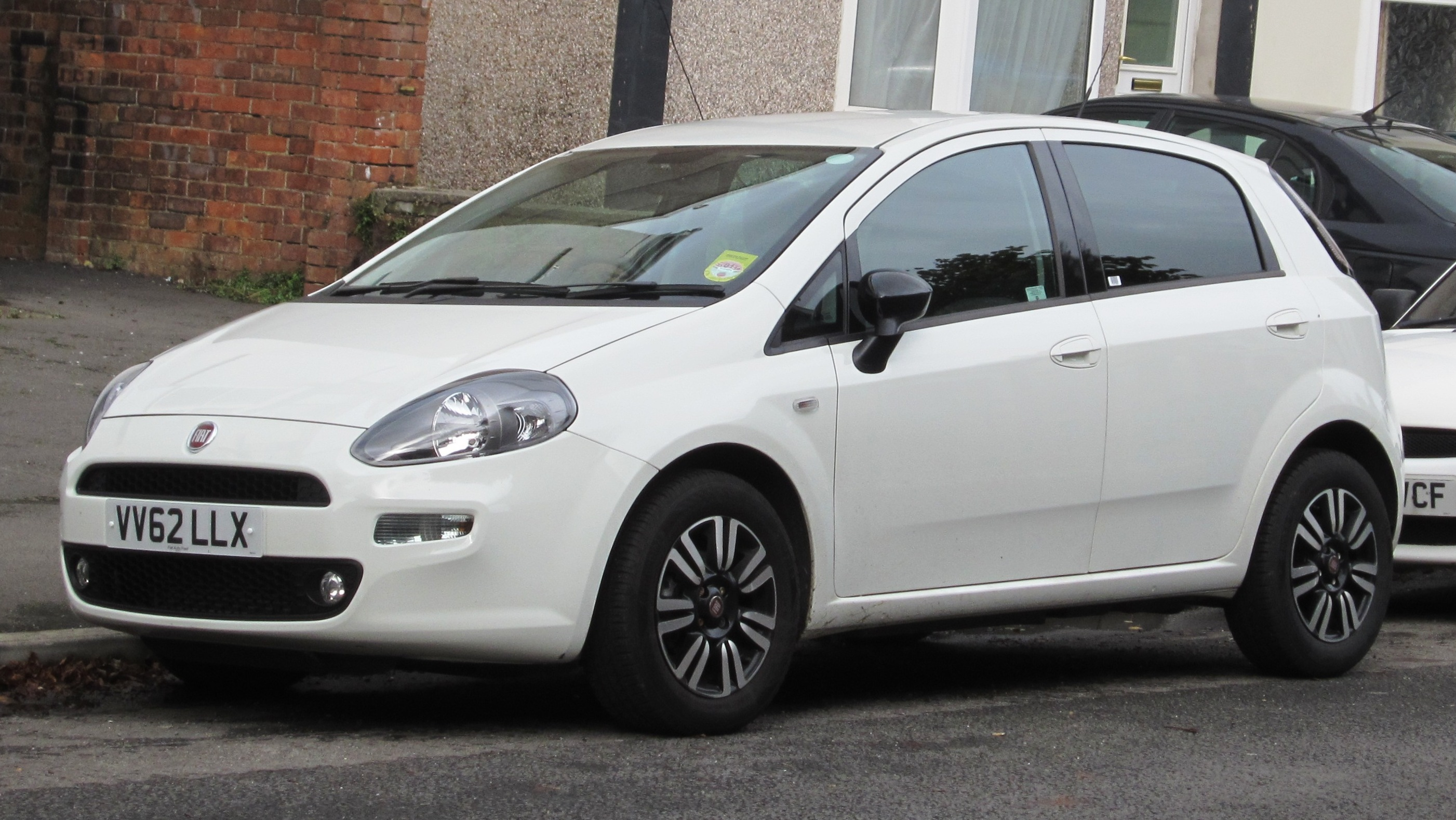
Fiat Punto (second facelift)

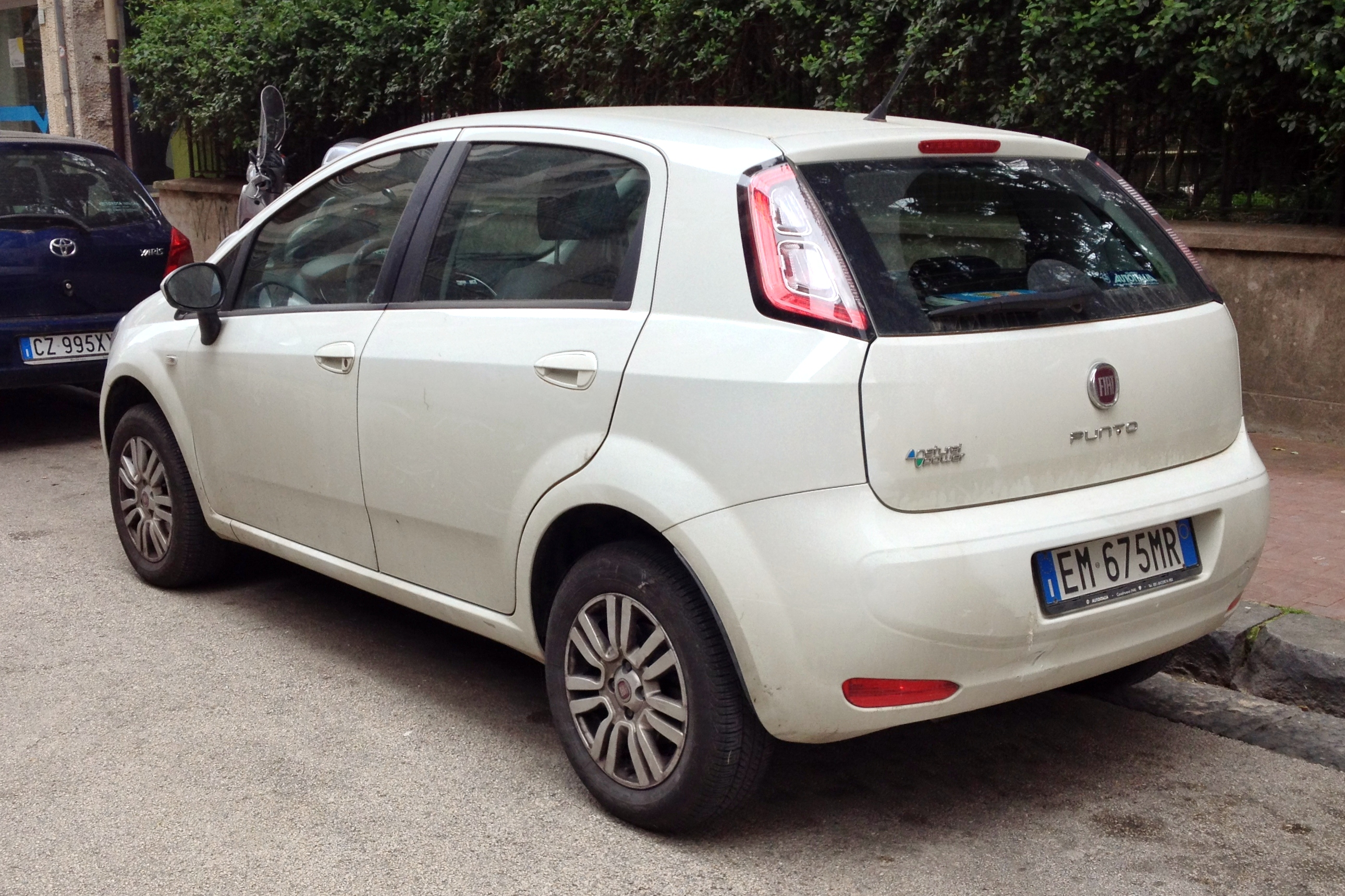
Rear view

=== 2014 Indian facelift (Punto Evo) ===
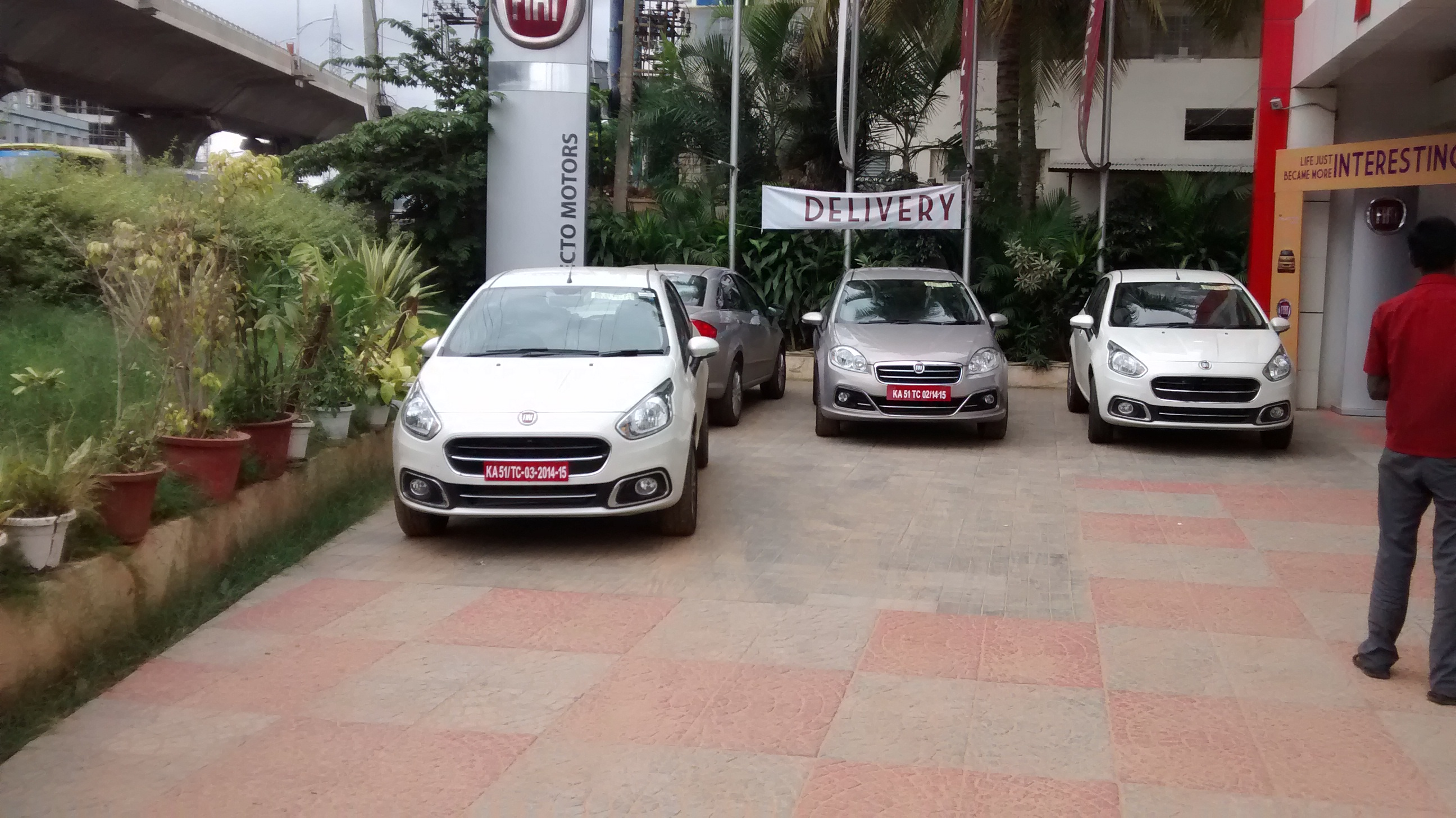
2014 Fiat Punto Evo (India; facelift)

Fiat India gave the Punto Evo an extensive and exclusive facelift in August 2014. The facelift consisted of large, swept back headlamps, a new grille and chrome inserts, whilst the rear of the car received LED taillamps from its European twin, and the dashboard from the European car. This car also sports an SUV like ground clearance of 185mm for diesel and 195mm for petrol to suit Indian roads. In August 2015, Fiat launched in India the Abarth brand, imported from Poland the Abarth 595 Competizione and the locally produced Abarth Punto, based on the 310-Punto five door.

Indian Abarth Punto come with a 1.4 Turbojet engine with 145 PS (107 kW; 143 hp) and new sport kit for exterior and interior including revised Abarth badge and retuned chassis. Transmission is a five speed manual.

Fiat India launched a crossover version of the Punto Evo called Avventura in India in October 2014. The Avventura was aimed at the market inhabited by the likes of Toyota Etios Cross, Volkswagen CrossPolo and Ford EcoSport.

Production in India ended in November 2018, together with the Abarth and Adventure versions. As a result, Fiat Chrysler Automobiles decided to withdraw the Fiat brand from the Indian market, leaving space to the brand of Jeep.

=== Punto Van ===
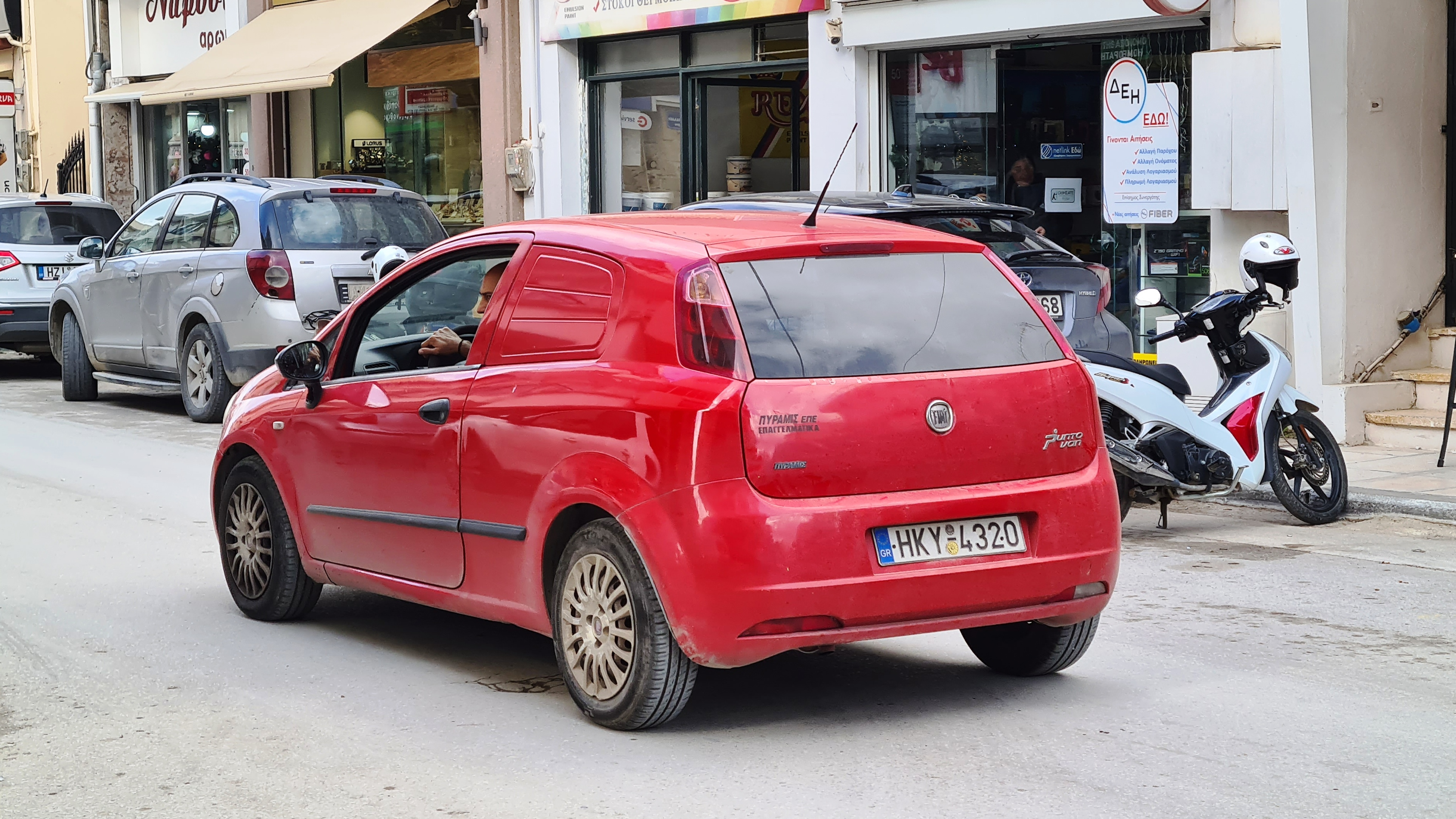
Fiat Punto Van

The Punto Van is a compact van designed for the commercial market. It features a petrol 1.2 8v engine, a petrol/CNG 1.2 8v engine, and a diesel 1.3 MultiJet 16v engine. It can be recognized by its blinded rear side windows and a Punto Van badge on the back.

=== Engines ===
Grande Punto
Model	Engine	Displacement	Power	Torque	Acceleration 0–100 km/h (0-62 mph)	Top speed	Notes
Petrol engines
1.2 8v FIRE	I4	1,242 cc	65 PS (48 kW; 64 hp) at 5500 rpm	102 N⋅m (75 lb⋅ft) at 3000 rpm	14.5 s	155 km/h (96 mph)	
1.4 8v FIRE	I4	1,368 cc	77 PS (57 kW; 76 hp) at 6000 rpm	115 N⋅m (85 lb⋅ft) at 3000 rpm	13.2 s	165 km/h (103 mph)	
1.4 16v StarJet	I4	1,368 cc	95 PS (70 kW; 94 hp) at 6000 rpm	125 N⋅m (92 lb⋅ft) at 4500 rpm	11.4 s	178 km/h (111 mph)	Six speed (2006–2016)
1.4 16v T-Jet	I4	1,368 cc	120 PS (88 kW; 118 hp) at 5000 rpm	206 N⋅m (152 lb⋅ft) at 1750 rpm	8.9 s	195 km/h (121 mph)	2007–2009
1.4 16v T-Jet	I4	1,368 cc	155 PS (114 kW; 153 hp) at 5500 rpm	230 N⋅m (170 lb⋅ft) at 3000 rpm	8.2 s	208 km/h (129 mph)	Abarth model, 2007–2010
1.4 16v T-Jet	I4	1,368 cc	180 PS (132 kW; 178 hp) at 5750 rpm	270 N⋅m (199 lb⋅ft) at 2500 rpm	7.5 s	216 km/h (134 mph)	Abarth "SS" performance kit, 2008–2018
Diesel engines
1.3 16v MultiJet	I4	1,248 cc	75 PS (55 kW; 74 hp) at 4000 rpm	190 N⋅m (140 lb⋅ft) at 1750 rpm	13.6 s	165 km/h (103 mph)	Five speed
1.3 16v MultiJet	I4	1,248 cc	90 PS (66 kW; 89 hp) at 4000 rpm	200 N⋅m (148 lb⋅ft) at 1750 rpm	11.9 s	175 km/h (109 mph)	Six speed
1.6 16v MultiJet	I4	1,598 cc	120 PS (88 kW; 120 hp) at 3750 rpm	320 N⋅m (236 lb⋅ft) at 1750 rpm	9.6 s	190 km/h (120 mph)	2008–2018
1.9 8v MultiJet	I4	1,910 cc	120 PS (88 kW; 118 hp) at 4000 rpm	280 N⋅m (207 lb⋅ft) at 2000 rpm	10.0 s	190 km/h (118 mph)	2005–2008
1.9 8v MultiJet	I4	1,910 cc	130 PS (96 kW; 128 hp) at 4000 rpm	280 N⋅m (207 lb⋅ft) at 2000 rpm	9.5 s	200 km/h (124 mph)	2005–2008
Punto Evo
Model	Engine	Displacement	Power	Torque	Acceleration 0–100 km/h (0-62 mph)	Top speed	Notes
Petrol engines
1.2 8v FIRE	I4	1,242 cc	65 PS (48 kW; 64 hp) at 5500 rpm	102 N⋅m (75 lb⋅ft) at 3000 rpm	14.5 s	155 km/h (96 mph)	
1.2 8v FIRE Euro5	I4	1,242 cc	69 PS (51 kW; 68 hp) at 5500 rpm	102 N⋅m (75 lb⋅ft) at 3000 rpm	14.5 s	155 km/h (96 mph)	
1.4 8v FIRE Start&Stop	I4	1,368 cc	77 PS (57 kW; 76 hp) at 6000 rpm	115 N⋅m (85 lb⋅ft) at 3250 rpm	13.2 s	165 km/h (103 mph)	
1.4 8v Bipower	I4	1,368 cc	77 PS (57 kW; 76 hp) at 6000 rpm	115 N⋅m (85 lb⋅ft) at 3000 rpm	14.9 s	162 km/h (101 mph)	Petrol
1.4 8v Bipower	I4	1,368 cc	70 PS (51 kW; 69 hp) at 6000 rpm	104 N⋅m (77 lb⋅ft) at 3000 rpm	16.9 s	156 km/h (97 mph)	Methane
1.4 8v GPL	I4	1,368 cc	77 PS (57 kW; 76 hp) at 6000 rpm	115 N⋅m (85 lb⋅ft) at 3000 rpm	13.2 s	165 km/h (103 mph)	
1.4 16v MultiAir	I4	1,368 cc	105 PS (77 kW; 104 hp) at 6500 rpm	130 N⋅m (96 lb⋅ft) at 4000 rpm	10.8 s	185 km/h (115 mph)	
1.4 16v MultiAir Turbo	I4	1,368 cc	135 PS (99 kW; 133 hp) at 5000 rpm	206 N⋅m (152 lb⋅ft) at 1750 rpm	8.5 s	205 km/h (127 mph)	2009–2018
1.4 16v MultiAir Turbo	I4	1,368 cc	165 PS (121 kW; 163 hp) at 5500 rpm	250 N⋅m (184 lb⋅ft) at 2250 rpm	7.9 s	213 km/h (132 mph)	Abarth model, 2010–2014
1.4 16v MultiAir Turbo	I4	1,368 cc	180 PS (132 kW; 178 hp) at 5750 rpm	270 N⋅m (199 lb⋅ft) at 2500 rpm	7.5 s	216 km/h (134 mph)	Abarth "SS" performance kit, 2010–2014
Diesel engines
1.3 16v Multijet 75	I4	1,248 cc	75 PS (55 kW; 74 hp) at 4000 rpm	190 N⋅m (140 lb⋅ft) at 1500 rpm	13.6 s	165 km/h (103 mph)	
1.3 16v Multijet 90	I4	1,248 cc	90 PS (66 kW; 89 hp) at 4000 rpm	200 N⋅m (148 lb⋅ft) at 1750 rpm	11.9 s	175 km/h (109 mph)	
1.3 16v Multijet 95	I4	1,248 cc	95 PS (70 kW; 94 hp) at 4000 rpm	200 N⋅m (148 lb⋅ft) at 1500 rpm	11.7 s	178 km/h (111 mph)	
1.6 16v Multijet	I4	1,598 cc	120 PS (88 kW; 118 hp) at 3750 rpm	320 N⋅m (236 lb⋅ft) at 1750 rpm	9.6 s	193 km/h (120 mph)	

Punto
Model	Engine	Displacement	Power	Torque	Acceleration 0–100 km/h (0-62 mph)	Top speed	Notes
Petrol engines
0.9 8v TwinAir	I2	875 cc	105 PS (77 kW; 104 hp) at 5500 rpm	145 N⋅m (107 lb⋅ft) at 2000 rpm	10.8 s	184 km/h (114 mph)	
Diesel engines
1.3 16v Multijet 75	I4	1,248 cc	75 PS (55 kW; 74 hp) at 4000 rpm	190 N⋅m (140 lb⋅ft) at 1500 rpm	13.6 s	165 km/h (103 mph)	

Source: FiatAutoPress.com

== Motorsport ==
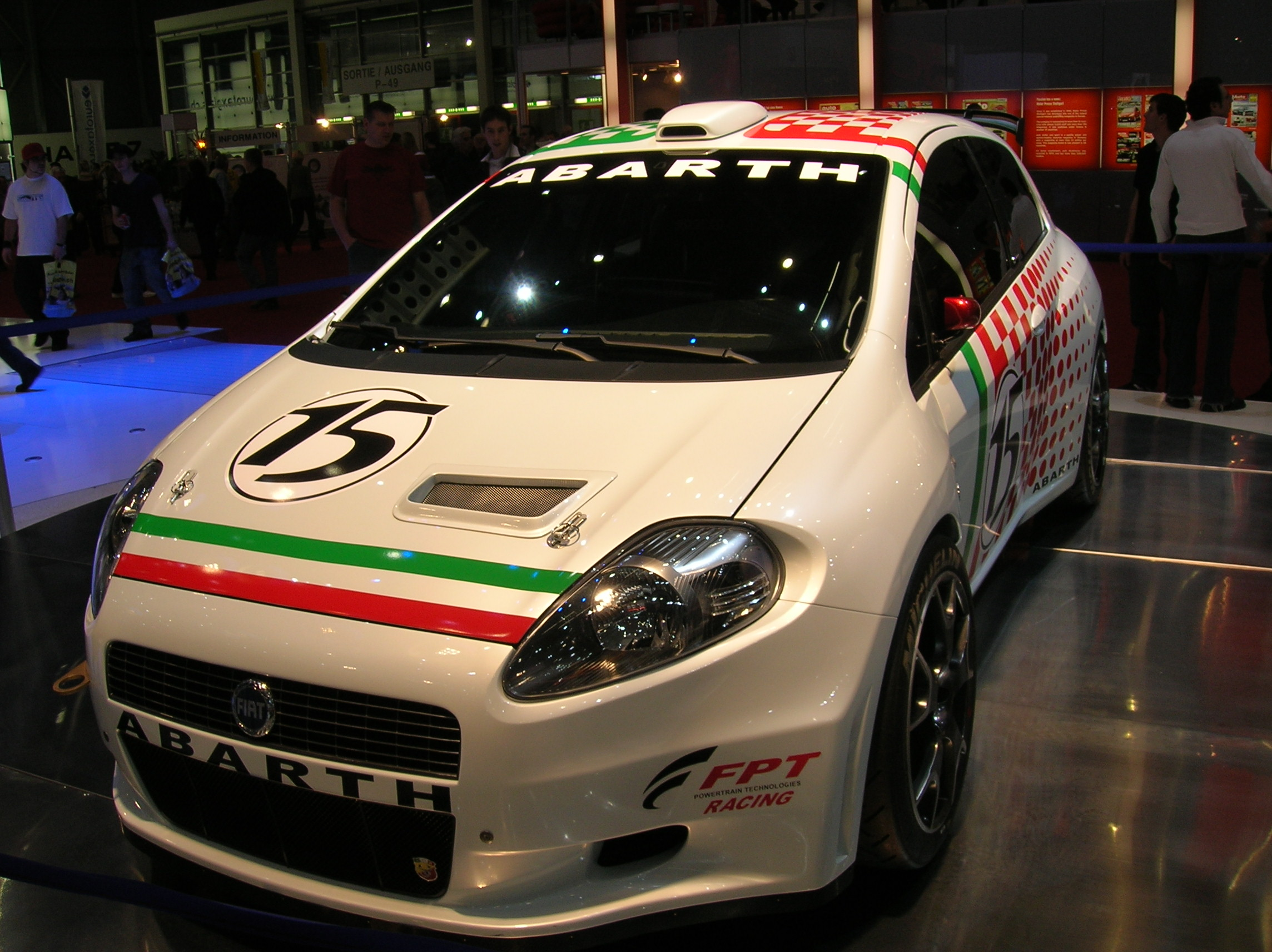
Fiat Grande Punto Abarth S2000

The Punto has always been popular with amateur racing drivers due to its low cost and the wide availability of spare parts. Numerous competition and homologated versions of the Punto have been produced, such as the Punto Rally, the S1600, and the Punto Abarth.

A new rally car based on the third generation Punto, the Super 2000 Punto Abarth, was unveiled in 2005. It is four-wheel drive and powered by a 2.0 L 16 valve engine capable of producing 280 hp (210 kW). Also, a turbodiesel front wheel drive rally car has been produced, the Fiat Grande Punto R3D.

The Punto has won several rally championships, specifically:

- Italian Rally Championship (2003 and 2006)
- European Rally Championship (2006)
- 2006 International Rally Challenge season

== Sales ==
Year	Italy	Brazil
1993	38,874	—N/a
1994	271,479	—N/a
1995	326,789	—N/a
1996	286,723	—N/a
1997	375,159	—N/a
1998	288,477	—N/a
1999	220,965	—N/a
2000	272,497	—N/a
2001	287,495	—N/a
2002	208,497	—N/a
2003	189,808	—N/a
2004	177,001	—N/a
2005	173,632	—N/a
2006	229,649	—N/a
2007	224,722	13,847
2008	156,945	38,578
2009	182,741	27,398
2010	155,301	35,720
2011	122,287	36,386
2012	80,011	42,369
2013	63,984	40,407
2014	57,054	24,649
2015	56,449	16,383
2016	45,208	7,709
2017	37,259	1,815
2018	21,302	23
2019	—N/a	8
2020	—N/a	1
2021	—N/a	1

== See also ==
- Fiat Linea
