= Toni Gardemeister =

Finnish rally driver (born 1975)

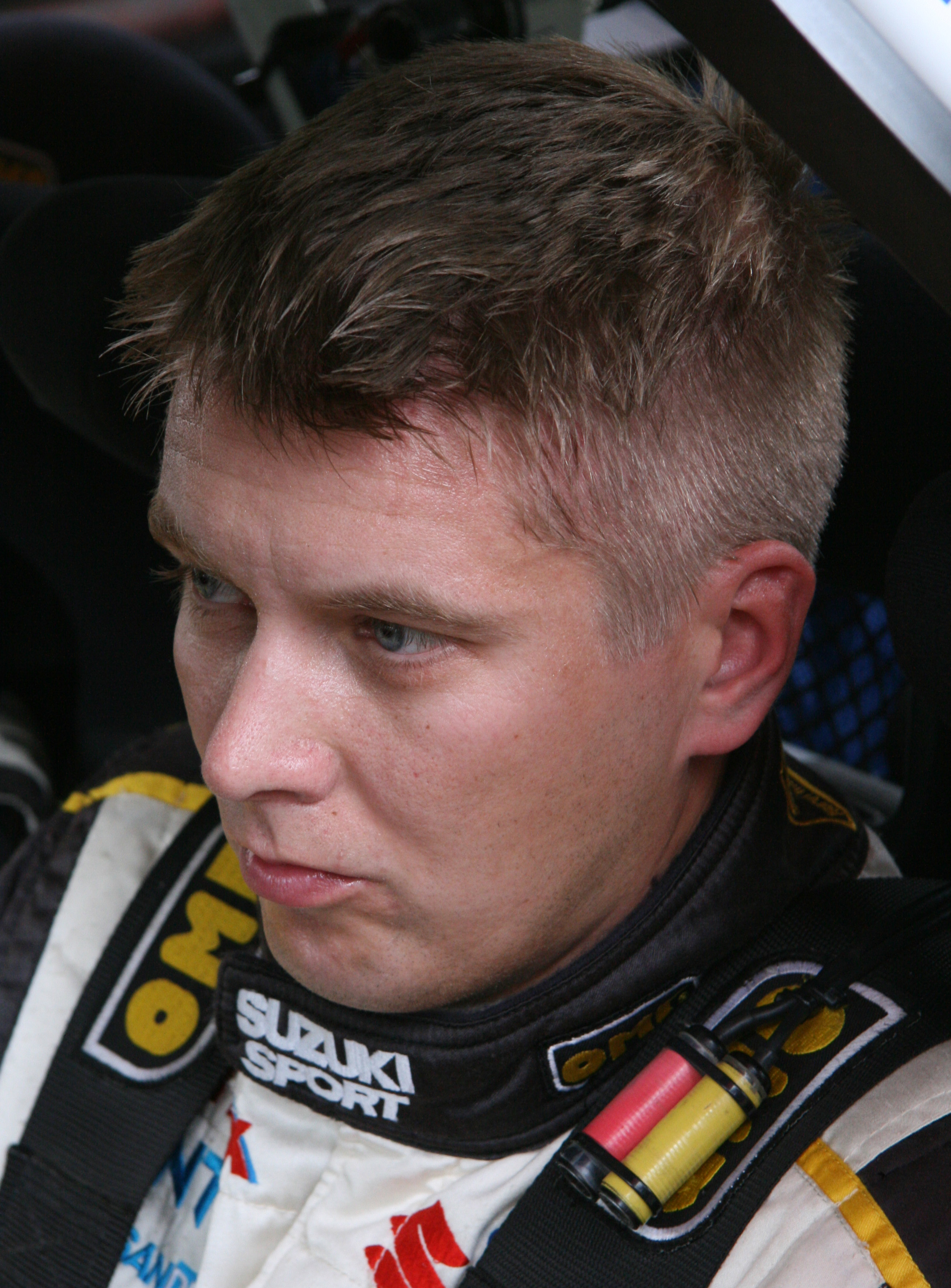
- Gardemeister at the 2008 Rally of New Zealand

Personal information
- Nationality: (Finland) Finnish
- Born: 31 March 1975 (age 51); Kouvola, Finland

World Rally Championship record
- Years active: 1996–2008, 2010
- Co-driver: (Finland) Paavo Lukander (Finland) Jakke Honkanen (Finland) Tomi Tuominen (Finland) Tapio Suominen
- Teams: SEAT, Mitsubishi, Škoda, Ford, Suzuki, Astra Racing
- Rallies: 112
- Championships: 0
- Rally wins: 0
- Podiums: 6
- Stage wins: 16
- Total points: 128
- First rally: 1996 Rally Finland
- Last rally: 2010 Rally Finland

Toni Gardemeister (born 31 March 1975) is a Finnish professional rally driver in the World Rally Championship. After previously competing for SEAT's, Mitsubishi's, Škoda's and Ford's factory teams, as well as for privateer teams, he joined the Suzuki World Rally Team for the 2008 season.

== Career ==
=== Early ===
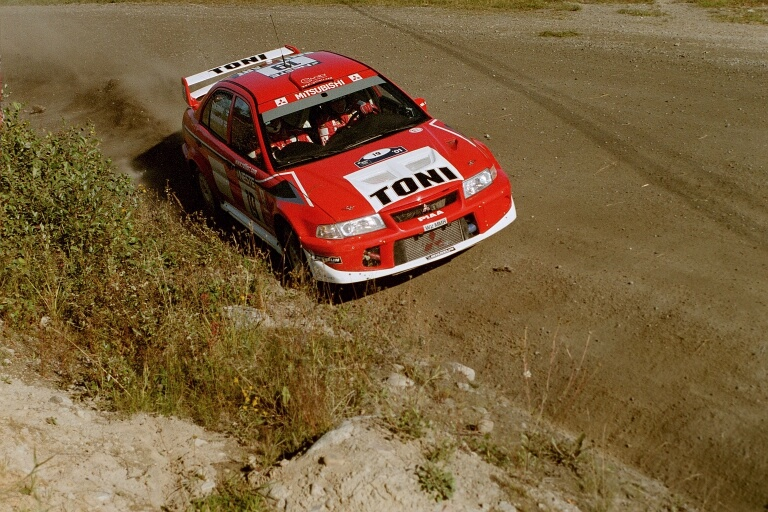
Gardemeister driving a Lancer Evo at the 2001 Rally Finland.

From the outset of his career, Gardemeister had shown himself as a driver of some promise. He won the Finnish Rally Championship Group a (under 2000 cc) title in 1997 behind the wheel of a Nissan Sunny and was driving for the Spanish car firm SEAT for limited outings in 1998 with the Ibiza.

Gardemeister was to become a world championship mainstay by the year 2000 in the firm's Córdoba WRC as team-mate to former world champion Didier Auriol. Gardemeister's impressive drives include a third place in New Zealand in 1999, and a fourth place on the 2000 Monte Carlo Rally.

With SEAT's surprise withdrawal from the 'works' scene for 2001 came two privateer opportunities in a Peugeot 206 WRC, in which Gardemeister scored drivers' points on both the Monte Carlo Rally and the Swedish Rally, finishing fifth and fourth, respectively. He was also drafted into Mitsubishi Ralliart team in Finland and New Zealand.

=== Škoda (2002–04) ===
These performances attracted the attention of Škoda to whom Gardemeister then moved. He was to drive the Octavia WRC throughout 2002 and 2003, reuniting with Auriol, as well as the Fabia WRC in 2004. His best results with the Octavia were fifth places at the 2002 Rally Argentina and 2003 Rally New Zealand. With the Fabia WRC, he finished seventh at the 2004 Rallye Deutschland.

=== Ford (2005) ===
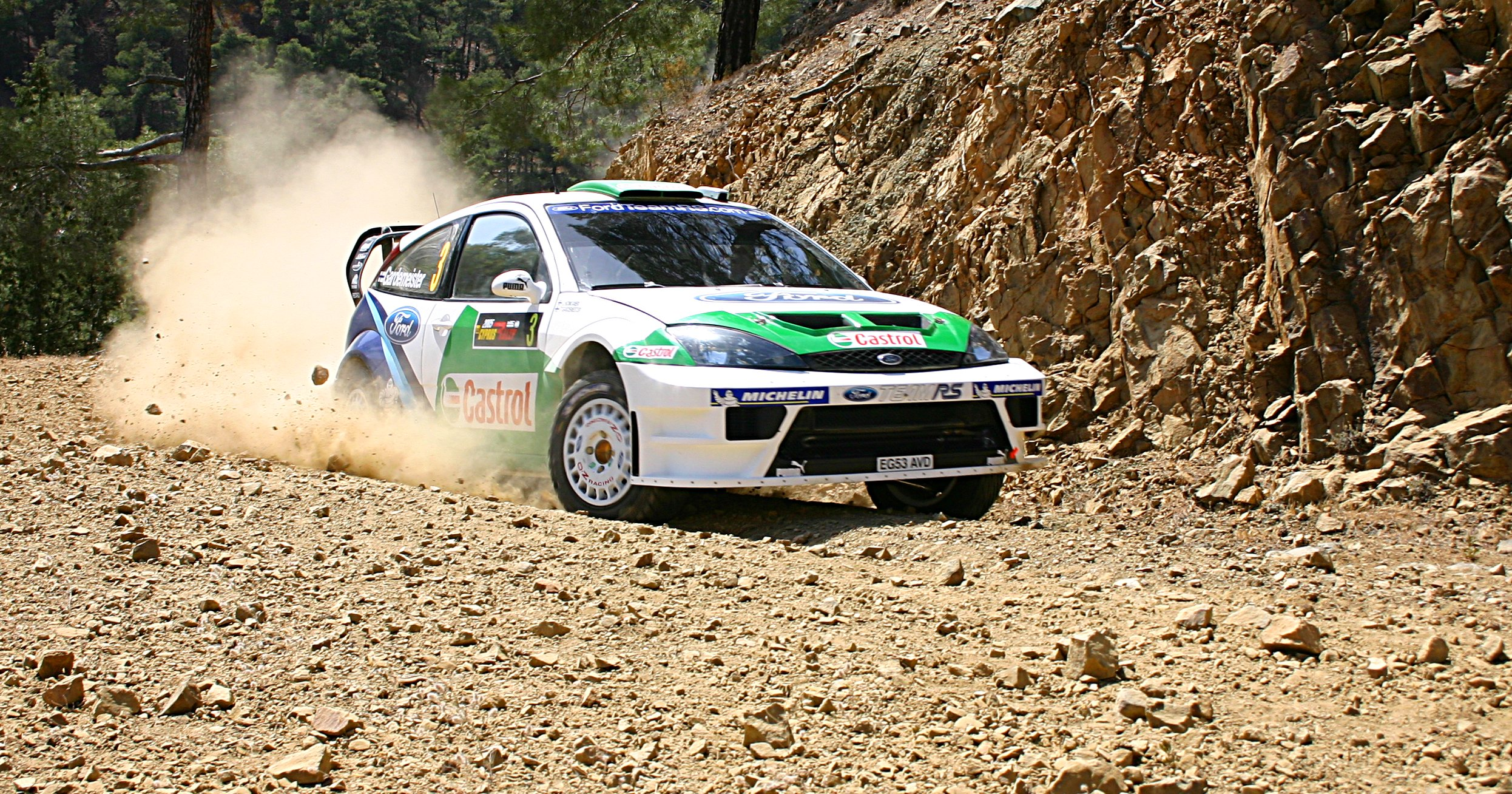
Gardemeister with a Ford Focus RS WRC 04 at the 2005 Cyprus Rally.

After securing a contract with the BP Ford World Rally Team, Ford's factory effort, for the 2005 season, after both of Ford's 2004 factory drivers Markko Märtin and Francois Duval left the team, Gardemeister drove his Ford Focus RS WRC 04 to a string of podiums and other points-scoring positions. A second place in Monte Carlo on his debut and a third in Sweden a month later - which caused him to temporarily lead the World Championship - were complemented by another second place, this time in the Acropolis Rally in the Spring of that year.

Finishing second once more on the Rallye de France in Corsica to the all-conquering Sébastien Loeb was thought to have aided Gardemeister's claim to retaining his drive with Ford for the 2006 season. However, with former Peugeot star Marcus Grönholm already signed to drive the 2006-specification factory Focus RS WRC, the news in November 2005 that Mikko Hirvonen had been signed to drive the second car in 2006 meant that Gardemeister would have to find a drive elsewhere. He finished the season a career-best fourth in the drivers' world championship, scoring twice as many points as his team-mate Roman Kresta.

=== 2006–07 ===
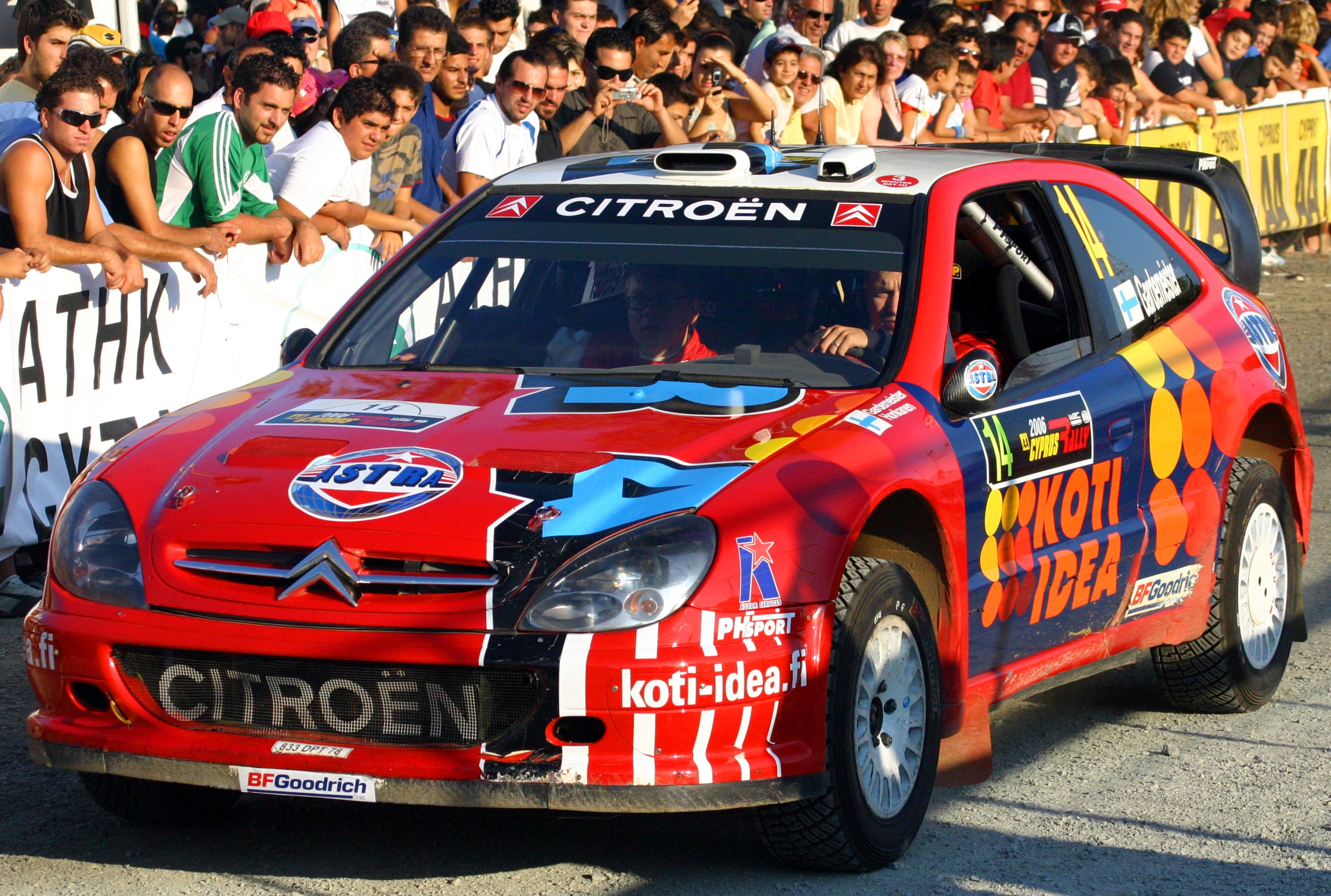
Gardemeister with a Citroën Xsara WRC at the 2006 Cyprus Rally.

Driving for the privateer Astra Racing team in a Peugeot 307 WRC with co-driver Jakke Honkanen, Gardemeister finished third in the 2006 Monte Carlo Rally, the first rally of the season. He went on to compete in three more world rallies driving a Citroën Xsara WRC, finishing fourth in Greece and Germany, and finishing fifth in Cyprus.

In the 2007 season, Gardemeister competed in five world rallies with a Mitsubishi Lancer WRC05 and one with a Citroën Xsara WRC. With the Lancer WRC05, he finished seventh in Monte Carlo and then sixth in Sweden and Sardinia, and suffered two retirements. With the Xsara WRC, he took seventh place at the 2007 Rallye Deutschland.

=== Suzuki (2008) ===
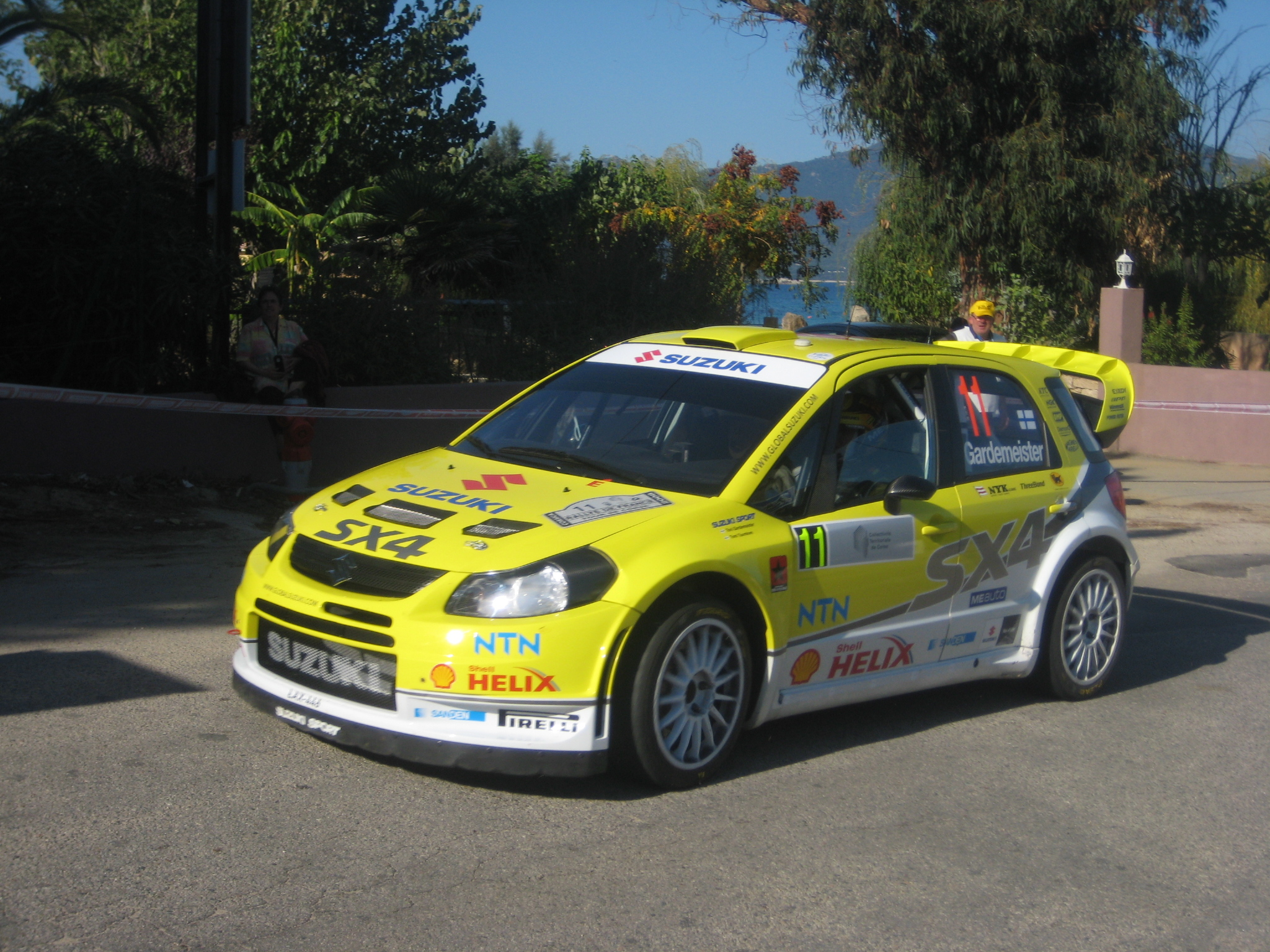
Gardemeister with a Suzuki SX4 WRC at the 2008 Tour de Corse.

Gardemeister resurfaced to the WRC full-time the following year. His hard work with privateer teams had not gone unnoticed, as the new Suzuki World Rally Team offered him and new co-driver Tomi Tuominen one of the two works drives in the 2008 World Rally Championship season. Gardemeister quickly performed, finishing seventh in only their second rally, the 2008 Swedish Rally.

Along with an eighth place in Finland and another seventh in New Zealand, Gardemeister also achieved Suzuki's first WRC stage win in Japan and finished sixth overall behind his team-mate PG Andersson. This marked Suzuki's best points finish and points haul of the 2008 season, on the team's home event. After the event, Toni said: "This has been a very tough but a very good rally for us, which has confirmed what I always thought: when we have a nice clean run with no problems, we are able to fight for a good position. I was also really proud to set Suzuki's first fastest stage time on Saturday. Given that we have not even finished our first full year yet and that we have done no testing, it really shows our potential for the future." With Suzuki retiring from motorsport before season 2009, Gardemeister lost his drive.

=== 2009–10 ===
For 2009, Gardemeister participated in only 2 rallies of the Intercontinental Rally Challenge (IRC). The first being the Rallye Monte Carlo with an Astra Racing run Fiat Grande Punto Abarth S2000. He retired because of technical problems from 2nd place, 2 special stages before the finish. The second was the Rallye Principe de Asturias, with an Opel Corsa S2000 run by Motor Sport Developments. Gardemeister crashed on SS9 from 12th place.

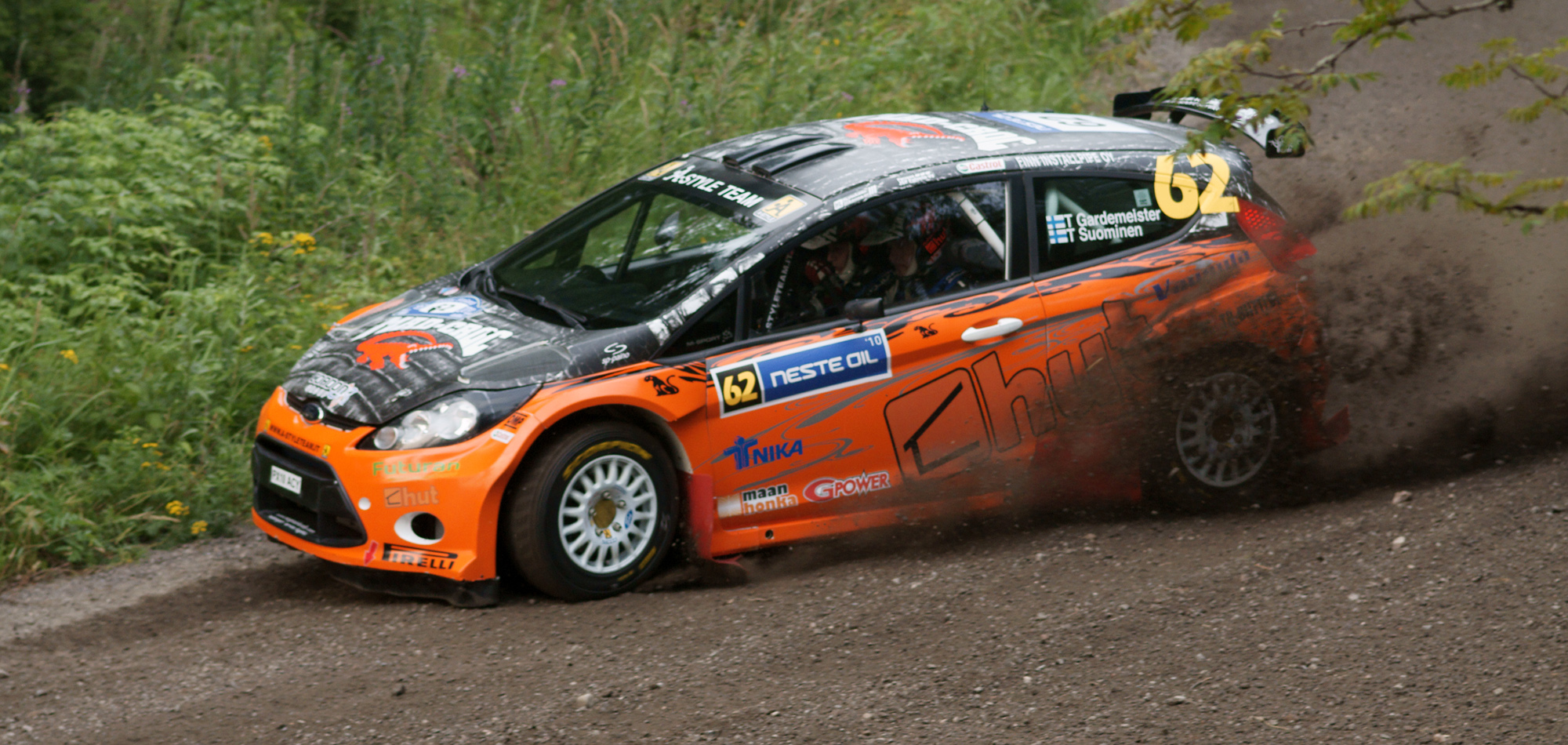
Gardemeister driving a Ford Fiesta S2000 at the 2010 Rally Finland.

In 2010, Gardemeister again participated at the IRC Rallye Monte Carlo with an Astra Racing run Fiat Grande Punto Abarth S2000. He surprisingly won the prologue but retired from 10th place on SS11. He also raced at WRC Rally Finland with a Ford Fiesta S2000, finishing 12th overall.

=== 2011–present ===
In 2011, Gardemeister entered the Rallye Monte Carlo with an Astra Racing-run Peugeot 207 S2000, and finished in 10th place. After that, he bought himself a Škoda Fabia S2000 and launched his own team, TGS Worldwide OU; his main sponsors were Mad Croc and Hankook. He missed only two rounds, the SATA Rally Azores and the Cyprus Rally; on all the others, he finished inside the top ten, his season best 6th place coming in Barum Rally Zlín. He sometimes complained that the works Škodas had a technical advantage over the marque's privateer drivers, because of certain updates they couldn't get. He finished the season 9th overall.

Gardemeister tried to put together the budget he needed to return to the IRC in 2012, but with Hankook leaving his team, his efforts were unsuccessful. He started to focus on renting out his Škoda, and entered some rally-raid events with various Mitsubishi cars, and achieved some good results. However, while competing on the Silk Way Rally, he suffered an accident which resulted in one twisted and two broken vertebrae. Gardemeister underwent a successful surgery to repair his back, and after a 9-month recovery, he is just as good as he was.

After his accident in 2012, Gardemeister has been running his TGS Worldwide company. TGS Worldwide has been concentrated on running mainly Škoda branded cars, the first Fabia S2000 and later R5 models. There have been a lot of young talents in the team in their early stages, names such as Teemu Suninen, Kalle Rovanperä, Juuso Nordgren, Eerik Pietarinen, and Pontus Tidemand.

== Results ==
=== WRC results ===
| Year | Entrant | Car | 1 | 2 | 3 | 4 | 5 | 6 | 7 | 8 | 9 | 10 | 11 | 12 | 13 | 14 | 15 | 16 | WDC | Points |
|---|---|---|---|---|---|---|---|---|---|---|---|---|---|---|---|---|---|---|---|---|
| 1996 | Toni Gardemeister | Opel Astra GSI 16V | SWE | KEN | IDN | GRC | ARG | FIN; Ret | AUS | ITA | ESP | | | | | | | | - | 0 |
| 1997 | Toni Gardemeister | Nissan Sunny GTI | MON | SWE; Ret | KEN | POR | ESP | FRA | ARG | GRC | NZL | FIN; 12 | IDN | ITA | AUS | GBR | | | - | 0 |
| 1998 | Promoracing Finland | Nissan Sunny GTI | MON | SWE; 21 | KEN | POR | ESP | FRA | ARG | GRC | | | | | | | | | - | 0 |
| 1998 | SEAT Sport | SEAT Ibiza GTI 16V Evo 2 | | | | | | | | | NZL; 16 | FIN; 14 | ITA; Ret | AUS; Ret | GBR; 16 | | | | - | 0 |
| 1999 | Toni Gardemeister | SEAT Ibiza GTI 16V Evo 2 | MON; 14 | | | | | | | | | | | | | | | | 12th | 6 |
| 1999 | Astra | SEAT Ibiza GTI 16V Evo 2 | | SWE; 33 | KEN | POR; Ret | ESP | FRA | ARG | GRC | | | | | | | | | 12th | 6 |
| 1999 | SEAT Sport | SEAT Córdoba WRC | | | | | | | | | NZL; 3 | | | | | | | | 12th | 6 |
| 1999 | SEAT Sport | SEAT Córdoba WRC Evo2 | | | | | | | | | | FIN; 6 | CHN | ITA; Ret | AUS; 16 | GBR; Ret | | | 12th | 6 |
| 2000 | SEAT Sport | SEAT Córdoba WRC Evo2 | MON; 4 | SWE; Ret | KEN; Ret | POR; 9 | ESP; Ret | ARG; Ret | GRC; Ret | NZL; Ret | | | | | | | | | 13th | 4 |
| 2000 | SEAT Sport | SEAT Córdoba WRC Evo3 | | | | | | | | | FIN; Ret | CYP; Ret | FRA; 11 | ITA; Ret | AUS; 6 | GBR; 12 | | | 13th | 4 |
| 2001 | Toni Gardemeister | Peugeot 206 WRC | MON; 5 | SWE; 4 | POR | ESP | ARG | CYP | GRC | KEN | | | | | | | | | 16th | 5 |
| 2001 | Marlboro Mitsubishi Ralliart | Mitsubishi Carisma GT | | | | | | | | | FIN; Ret | NZL; 15 | ITA | FRA | AUS | GBR | | | 16th | 5 |
| 2002 | Škoda Motorsport | Škoda Octavia WRC Evo2 | MON; 10 | SWE; Ret | FRA; 12 | ESP; 11 | CYP; 15 | ARG; 5 | GRE; 10 | KEN; Ret | | | | | | | | | 13th | 3 |
| 2002 | Škoda Motorsport | Škoda Octavia WRC Evo3 | | | | | | | | | FIN; 12 | GER; Ret | ITA; Ret | NZL; 8 | AUS; 6 | GBR; 10 | | | 13th | 3 |
| 2003 | Škoda Motorsport | Škoda Octavia WRC Evo3 | MON; Ret | SWE; 8 | TUR; 7 | NZL; 5 | ARG; 7 | GRE; Ret | CYP; Ret | | | | | | | | | | 12th | 9 |
| 2003 | Škoda Motorsport | Škoda Fabia WRC | | | | | | | | GER; Ret | FIN; Ret | AUS; 11 | ITA; Ret | FRA; 11 | ESP; 12 | GBR; Ret | | | 12th | 9 |
| 2004 | Škoda Motorsport | Škoda Fabia WRC | MON | SWE | MEX | NZL | CYP | GRE; Ret | TUR | ARG | FIN; 8 | GER; 7 | JPN | GBR; 22 | ITA; Ret | FRA; 9 | ESP; 9 | AUS | 24th | 3 |
| 2005 | BP Ford World Rally Team | Ford Focus RS WRC 04 | MON; 2 | SWE; 3 | MEX; 6 | NZL; 6 | ITA; 5 | CYP; 5 | TUR; 6 | GRE; 2 | ARG; 4 | FIN; 6 | GER; 17 | GBR; DSQ | JPN; 6 | FRA; 2 | ESP; 14 | | 4th | 58 |
| 2005 | BP Ford World Rally Team | Ford Focus RS WRC 06 | | | | | | | | | | | | | | | | AUS; Ret | 4th | 58 |
| 2006 | Astra Racing | Peugeot 307 WRC | MON; 3 | SWE | MEX | ESP | FRA | ARG | ITA | | | | | | | | | | 9th | 20 |
| 2006 | Astra Racing | Citroën Xsara WRC | | | | | | | | GRE; 4 | GER; 4 | FIN | JPN | CYP; 5 | TUR | AUS | NZL | GBR | 9th | 20 |
| 2007 | MMSP LTD | Mitsubishi Lancer WRC05 | MON; 7 | SWE; 6 | | | | | | | | | | | | | | | 13th | 10 |
| 2007 | Toni Gardemeister | Mitsubishi Lancer WRC05 | | | NOR; Ret | MEX | POR; DSQ | ARG | ITA; 6 | GRE | FIN | | | | | | | | 13th | 10 |
| 2007 | Astra Racing | Citroën Xsara WRC | | | | | | | | | | GER; 7 | NZL | ESP | FRA | JPN | IRE | GBR | 13th | 10 |
| 2008 | Suzuki World Rally Team | Suzuki SX4 WRC | MON; Ret | SWE; 7 | MEX; Ret | ARG; Ret | JOR; Ret | ITA; Ret | GRE; 9 | TUR; Ret | FIN; 8 | GER; 10 | NZL; 7 | ESP; 13 | FRA; 13 | JPN; 6 | GBR; 7 | | 13th | 10 |
| 2010 | Toni Gardemeister | Ford Fiesta S2000 | SWE | MEX | JOR | TUR | NZL | POR | BUL | FIN; 12 | GER | JPN | FRA | ESP | GBR | | | | - | 0 |

=== IRC results ===
| Year | Entrant | Car | 1 | 2 | 3 | 4 | 5 | 6 | 7 | 8 | 9 | 10 | 11 | 12 | IRC | Points |
|---|---|---|---|---|---|---|---|---|---|---|---|---|---|---|---|---|
| 2009 | Astra Racing | Fiat Abarth Grande Punto S2000 | MON; Ret | CUR | SAF | AZO | YPR | RUS | MAD | ZLI | AST | ITA | SCO | | - | 0 |
| 2010 | Astra Racing | Fiat Abarth Grande Punto S2000 | MON; Ret | CUR | ARG | CAN | SAR | YPR | AZO | MAD | ZLI | SAN | SCO | CYP | - | 0 |
| 2011 | Astra Racing | Peugeot 207 S2000 | MON; 10 | | | | | | | | | | | | 9th | 45 |
| 2011 | TGS Worldwide OU | Škoda Fabia S2000 | | CAN; 10 | COR; 8 | YAL; 7 | YPR; 7 | AZO | ZLI; 6 | MEC; 7 | SAN; 9 | SCO; 7 | CYP | | 9th | 45 |
