= Luca Betti =

Italian rally driver (born 1978)

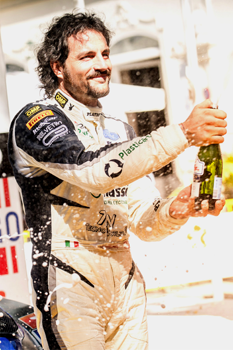

Personal information
- Nationality: (Italy) Italian
- Born: February 22, 1978 (age 48)

World Rally Championship record
- Years active: 2000–2001, 2004–2008, 2013
- Co-driver: (Italy) Paolo Del Grande (Italy) Andrea Gorni (Italy) Claudio Vischioni (Italy) Michele Rosso (Italy) Giovanni Agnese (Italy) Piercarlo Capolongo (Italy) Francesco Pezzoli
- Teams: Privateer, Symtech Racing
- Rallies: 29
- Championships: 0
- Rally wins: 0
- Podiums: 0
- Stage wins: 0
- Total points: 0
- First rally: 2000 Rally GB
- Last rally: 2013 Monte Carlo Rally

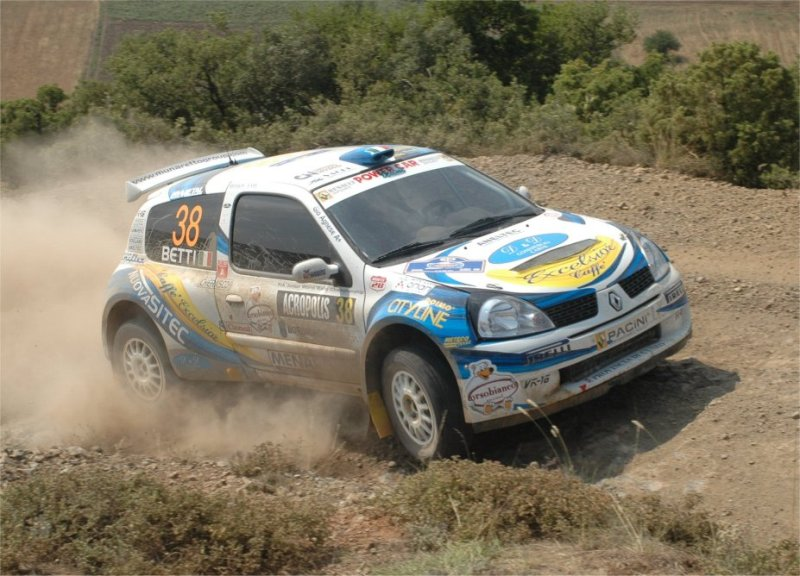
Betti competing in the 2005 Acropolis Rally

Luca Betti (born 22 February 1978) is an Italian former rally driver who competed in the World Rally Championship between 2000 and 2013. He began rallying in the WRC at the 2000 Rally GB and has entered various rallies since, particularly in the Junior World Rally Championship. He has also competed in the European Rally Championship finishing runner-up in 2011 and in the 3rd place in 2012. He is the founder of Kimera Automobil which built the EVO37, a tribute to the Lancia Rally 037.

== WRC results ==
Year	Entrant	Car	1	2	3	4	5	6	7	8	9	10	11	12	13	14	15	16	WDC	Points
2000	Luca Betti	Renault Clio 16S	MON	SWE	KEN	POR	ESP	ARG	GRE	NZL	FIN	CYP	FRA	ITA	AUS	GBR; Ret			NC	0
2001	Luca Betti	Renault Clio Williams	MON	SWE	POR	ESP; Ret	ARG	CYP											NC	0
2001	Luca Betti	Mitsubishi Lancer Evo V							GRE; Ret	KEN	FIN; Ret	NZL	ITA	FRA	AUS				NC	0
2001	Luca Betti	Fiat Punto S1600														GBR; 39			NC	0
2004	Luca Betti	Peugeot 206 S1600	MON; Ret	SWE	MEX	NZL	CYP	GRE; Ret	TUR; Ret	ARG	FIN; Ret	GER	JPN						NC	0
2004	Luca Betti	Fiat Punto S1600												GBR; 26	ITA; Ret	FRA	ESP; 33	AUS	NC	0
2005	Luca Betti	Renault Clio S1600	MON; 16	SWE	MEX	NZL	ITA; 21	CYP	TUR	GRE; Ret	ARG	FIN; 21	GER; 20	GBR	JPN	FRA; Ret	ESP; Ret	AUS	NC	0
2006	Luca Betti	Renault Clio S1600	MON	SWE	MEX	ESP; Ret	FRA; Ret	ARG	ITA; 24	GRE	GER; 26	FIN	JPN	CYP	TUR	AUS	NZL	GBR; 22	NC	0
2007	Luca Betti	Renault Clio S1600	MON; 19	SWE	NOR	MEX	POR	ARG	ITA	GRE	FIN	GER	NZL	ESP	FRA	JPN	IRE	GBR	NC	0
2008	Luca Betti	Honda Civic Type-R R3	MON; 19	SWE	MEX	ARG	JOR	ITA	GRE	TUR	FIN	GER	NZL	ESP	FRA	JPN	GBR		NC	0
2013	Symtech Racing	Peugeot 207 S2000	MON; Ret	SWE	MEX	POR	ARG	GRE	ITA	FIN	GER	AUS	FRA	ESP	GBR				NC	0

=== JWRC results ===
Year	Entrant	Car	1	2	3	4	5	6	7	8	9	JWRC	Points
2004	Luca Betti	Peugeot 206 S1600	MON; Ret	GRE; Ret	TUR; Ret	FIN; Ret						16th	3
2004	Luca Betti	Fiat Punto S1600					GBR; 6	ITA; Ret	ESP; 10			16th	3
2005	Luca Betti	Renault Clio S1600	MON; 5	MEX	ITA; 4	GRE; Ret	FIN; 4	GER; 6	FRA; Ret	ESP; Ret		8th	17
2006	Luca Betti	Renault Clio S1600	SWE	ESP; Ret	FRA; Ret	ARG	ITA; 6	GER; 8	FIN	TUR	GBR; 2	13th	12

=== WRC 2 results ===
Year	Entrant	Car	1	2	3	4	5	6	7	8	9	10	11	12	13	WRC 2	Points
2013	Symtech Racing	Peugeot 207 S2000	MON; Ret	SWE	MEX	POR	ARG	GRE	ITA	FIN	GER	AUS	FRA	ESP	GBR	NC	0
