= Per-Gunnar Andersson (rally driver) =

Swedish rally driver (born 1980)

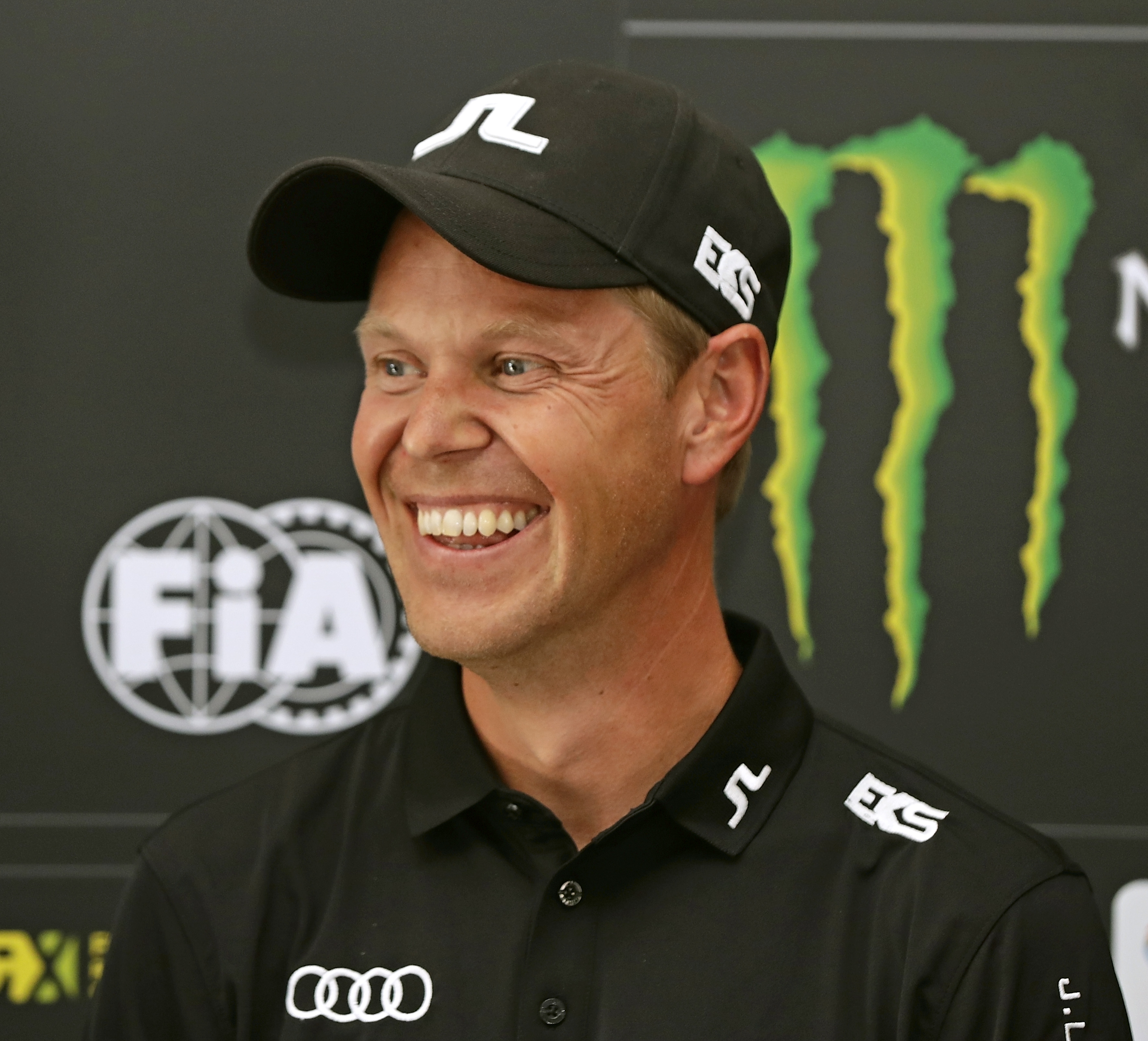
- Andersson at the 2017 World RX of Sweden

Personal information
- Nationality: (Sweden) Swedish
- Born: 10 March 1980 (age 46)

World Rally Championship record
- Years active: 2002–2013, 2022
- Co-driver: (Sweden) Jonas Andersson (Sweden) Anders Fredriksson (Sweden) Emil Axelsson
- Teams: Suzuki, Stobart Ford
- Rallies: 75
- Championships: 0
- Rally wins: 0
- Podiums: 0
- Stage wins: 6
- Total points: 34
- First rally: 2002 Swedish Rally
- Last rally: 2022 Rally Sweden

Per-Gunnar "P-G" Andersson (born 10 March 1980 in Årjäng) is a Swedish rally driver. He is a two-time winner of the Junior World Rally Championship.

== Career ==
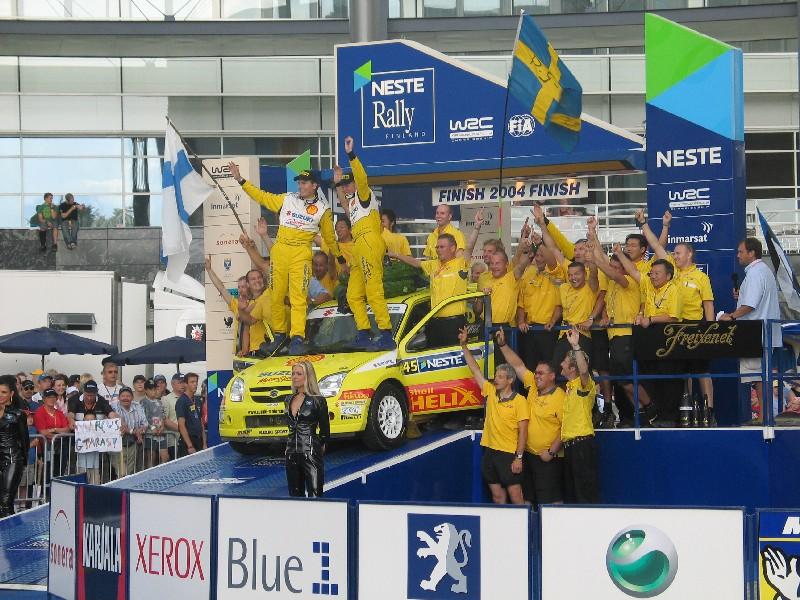
Andersson celebrating his first JWRC victory at 2004 Rally Finland

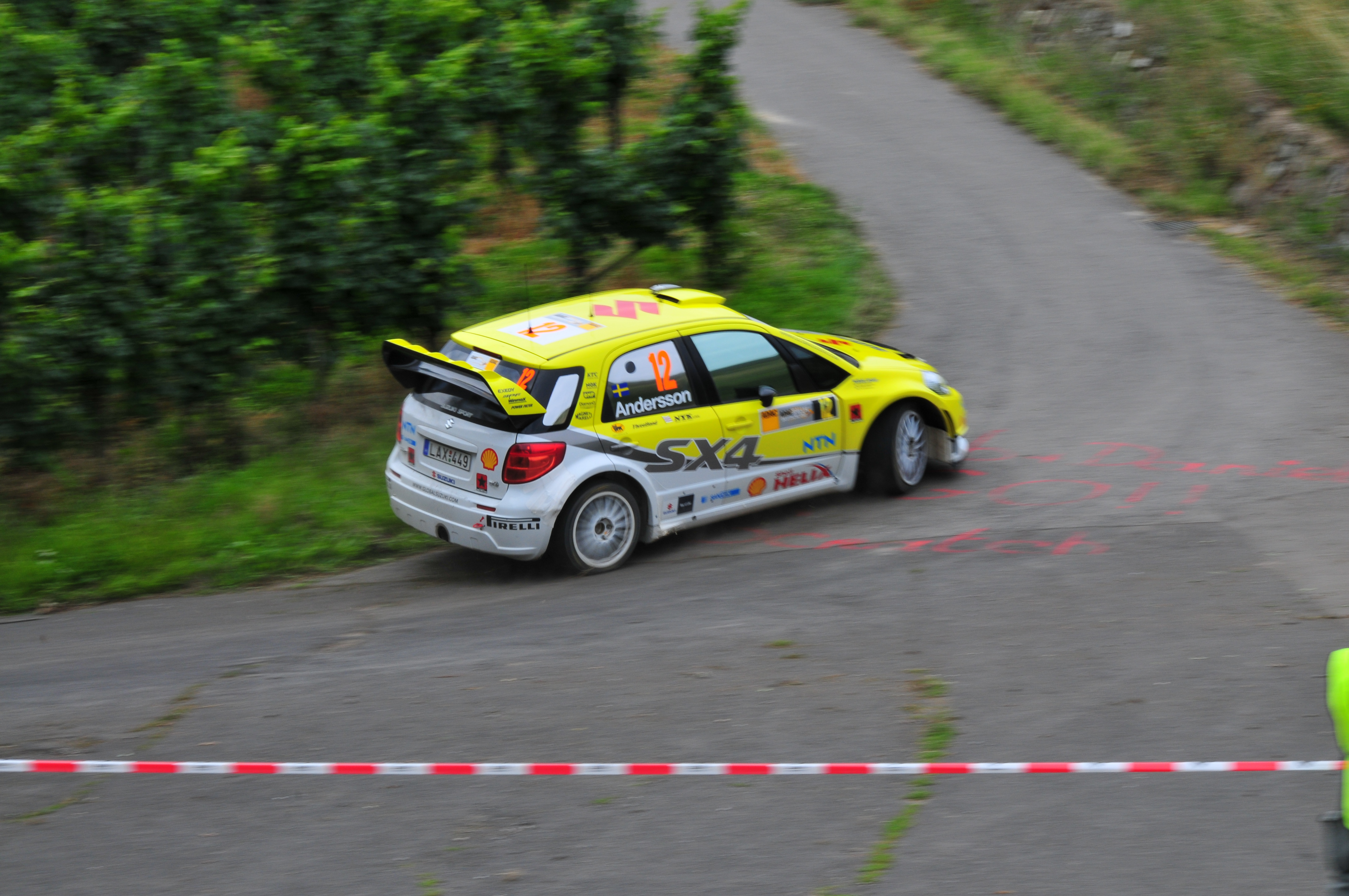
Andersson with Suzuki SX4 WRC at 2008 Rally Deutschland

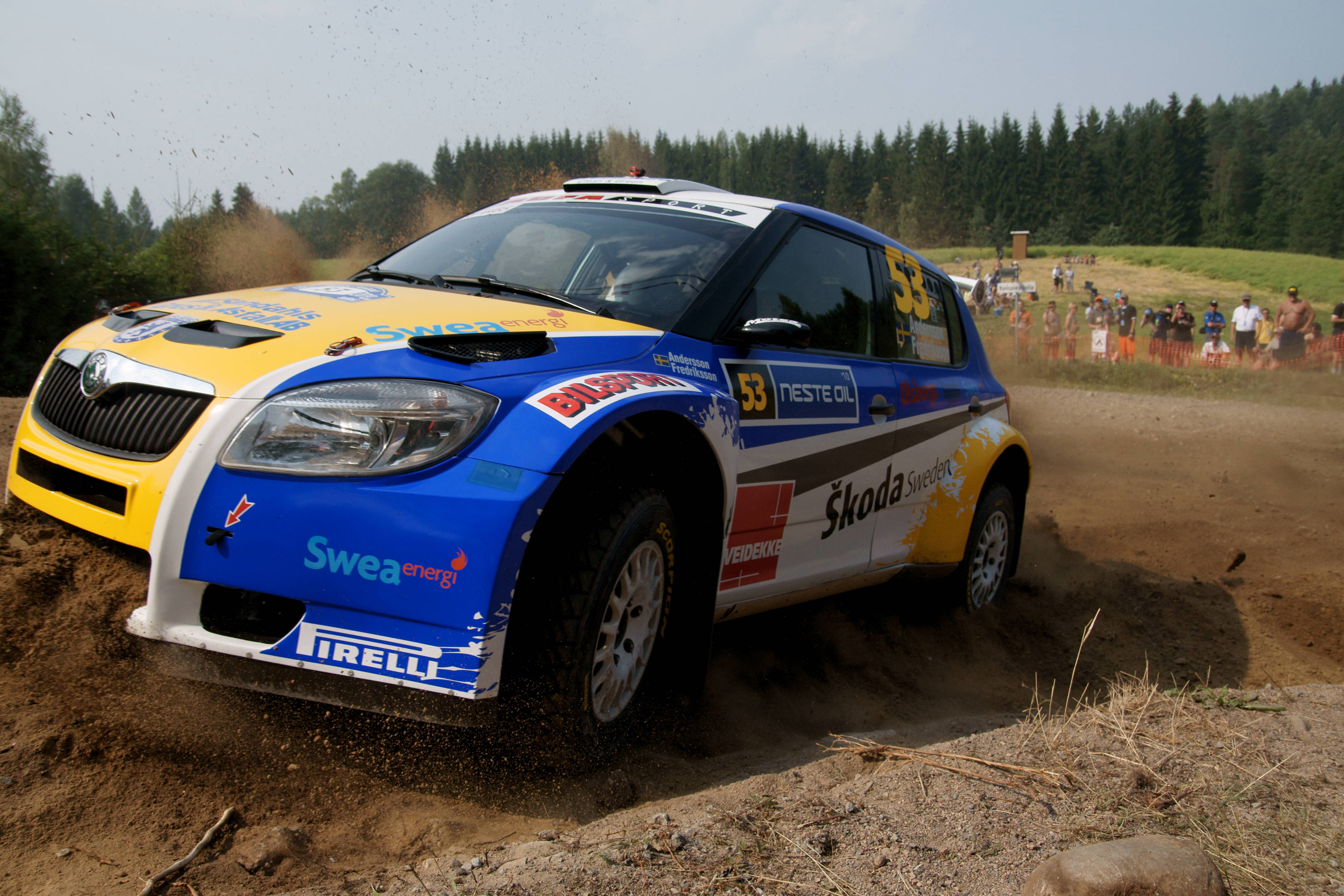
Andersson at 2010 Rally Finland with Škoda Fabia S2000

Andersson was competing in Junior World Rally Championship since 2003. He became JWRC champion in 2004 during his first complete season. Piloting a Suzuki Ignis S1600, he earned three wins, a second place, an eight place, and two retirements. He scored 39 points during this year while runner-up Nicolas Bernardi, piloting Renault Clio S1600, scored only two fewer points.

In 2005 season, Andersson continued competing in the JWRC with Suzuki Ignis S1600 and later Suzuki Swift S1600. Although he won Rally Acropolis, the rest of season wasn't that successful and, in final standings, Andersson finished sixth with 30 points.

In 2006, Andersson was still racing in JWRC with a Suzuki Swift S1600. He won Rally Sweden but was excluded from Rally Turkey and crashed at Rally GB. He finished the season in third place with 29 points. Second place was Urmo Aava piloting a Suzuki Swift S1600 with 31 points, and Patrik Sandell became JWRC champion piloting a Renault Clio S1600 with 32 points.

In 2007, Andersson became Junior World Rally Champion for a second time with a Suzuki Swift S1600. Andersson won three rallies, scored one second place and one fourth place. Runner-up was Urmo Aava piloting a Suzuki Swift S1600 and third was Martin Prokop piloting a Citroen C2 S1600.

With two JWRC titles, Andersson was chosen by factory WRC team. Suzuki World Rally Team in the 2008 season. He started the season by finishing eighth at the 2008 Monte Carlo Rally in his first rally in a World Rally Car. He suffered from many mistakes and retirements during the season, finishing in the points only four times. His best result came in last two rallies of the season, fifth places at Rally Japan and Rally GB.

After the withdrawal of the Suzuki team at the end of 2008, Andersson was left without a regular drive for 2009. A drive in an ageing Škoda Fabia at Rally Norway saw two stage wins and a place in the top six on the first day before clutch problems forced him to retire. After that Andersson participated only at few local rallies and prepared for next season.

In 2010, Andersson was racing in SWRC with Škoda Fabia S2000, and won SWRC Rally Sweden. Although he was later removed from SWRC 2010 standings and only his victory in Sweden counted. He also raced a Ford Focus WRC in Rally Bulgaria for Stobart WRT and finished seventh.

In 2011, Andersson competed in two WRC events with a Ford Fiesta RS WRC, finishing seventh in Sweden and in Italy. He drove Tommi Mäkinen Racing's Subaru Impreza STi R4 on Rally Finland, finishing fifteenth. He was also signed by Proton Motorsport to drive one of the Satria Neo S2000s in the Intercontinental Rally Challenge. The team's season was full of mechanical failures. The competitiveness of the car was also poor compared to that of rivals (i.e. Skoda Fabia S2000, Peugeot 207 S2000); he only scored points in the Barum Czech Rally Zlín, finishing ninth.

As for 2012, Proton decided to enter the S2000 World Rally Championship (SWRC), with Andersson as their number one driver. The season started off bittersweet, with Andersson leading almost till the end of the Monte Carlo Rallye, but was forced to retire due to fire. In Sweden, he bounced back, and won the SWRC category. He followed this up with a second place in New Zealand, and with a win in Finland. However, due to various problems and retirements in Wales and France, Craig Breen passed Andersson to claim the lead of the category, and with Andersson unable to win in Spain, he finished runner-up to the Irishman, although this was Proton's best result since winning the PWRC in 2002.

== Racing record ==
=== Complete WRC results ===
Year	Entrant	Car	1	2	3	4	5	6	7	8	9	10	11	12	13	14	15	16	WDC	Points
2002	Per-Gunnar Andersson	Renault Clio RS	MON	SWE; 43	FRA	ESP	CYP	ARG	GRE	KEN	FIN	GER	ITA	NZL	AUS	GBR			NC	0
2003	Per-Gunnar Andersson	Renault Clio S1600	MON	SWE	TUR	NZL	ARG	GRE	CYP	GER	FIN; Ret	AUS	ITA; 19	FRA	ESP; Ret	GBR; Ret			NC	0
2004	Per-Gunnar Andersson	Suzuki Ignis S1600	MON; 19					GRE; Ret	TUR; 11	ARG	FIN; 16	GER	JPN; Ret	GBR; Ret	ITA; 9	FRA	ESP; 16	AUS	NC	0
2004	Per-Gunnar Andersson	Mitsubishi Lancer Evo VII		SWE; 25	MEX	NZL	CYP												NC	0
2005	Per-Gunnar Andersson	Suzuki Ignis S1600	MON; 18	SWE; 18	MEX; 14	NZL; 17	ITA; 22	CYP; 33	TUR; 19	GRE; 15	ARG								NC	0
2005	Per-Gunnar Andersson	Suzuki Swift S1600										FIN; Ret	GER; 16	GBR; 22	JPN; 22	FRA	ESP; Ret	AUS	NC	0
2006	Per-Gunnar Andersson	Suzuki Swift S1600	MON	SWE; 19	MEX	ESP	FRA	ARG; 34	ITA; 21	GRE	GER	FIN; 18	JPN	CYP	TUR; DSQ	AUS	NZL	GBR; Ret	NC	0
2007	Suzuki Sports Europe	Suzuki Swift S1600	MON	SWE	NOR; 18	MEX	POR; 14	ARG	ITA; 14	GRE	FIN	GER	NZL	ESP; 15	FRA; 20	JPN	IRE	GBR	NC	0
2008	Suzuki World Rally Team	Suzuki SX4 WRC	MON; 8	SWE; Ret	MEX; Ret	ARG; 24	JOR; Ret	ITA; 9	GRE; 11	TUR; Ret	FIN; Ret	GER; 15	NZL; 6	ESP; 32	FRA; 17	JPN; 5	GBR; 5		12th	12
2009	Per-Gunnar Andersson	Škoda Fabia WRC	IRE	NOR; Ret	CYP	POR	ARG	ITA	GRE	POL	FIN	AUS	ESP	GBR					NC	0
2010	Per-Gunnar Andersson	Škoda Fabia S2000	SWE; 10																13th	8
2010	Rufa Sport	Škoda Fabia S2000		MEX	JOR; 16	TUR	NZL	POR; 16		FIN; 10	GER; 13	JPN	FRA	ESP	GBR				13th	8
2010	Stobart M-Sport Ford Rally Team	Ford Focus RS WRC 08							BUL; 7										13th	8
2011	Per-Gunnar Andersson	Ford Fiesta RS WRC	SWE; 7	MEX	POR	JOR													20th	6
2011	M-Sport Stobart Ford World Rally Team	Ford Fiesta RS WRC					ITA; 15	ARG	GRE										20th	6
2011	Tommi Mäkinen Racing	Subaru Impreza STi R4								FIN; 15	GER	AUS	FRA	ESP	GBR				20th	6
2012	Proton Motorsport	Proton Satria Neo S2000	MON; Ret	SWE; 14	MEX	POR	ARG	GRE	NZL; 23	FIN; 11	GER	GBR; 24	FRA; 24	ITA	ESP; 8				24th	4
2013	Per-Gunnar Andersson	Ford Fiesta S2000	MON	SWE	MEX	POR; Ret	ARG	GRE											23rd	4
2013	AT Rally Team	Ford Fiesta RS WRC							ITA; 13	FIN; 8	GER; Ret	AUS	FRA	ESP	GBR				23rd	4
2022	Per-Gunnar Andersson	Ford Fiesta Rally2	MON	SWE; Ret	CRO	POR	ITA	KEN	EST	FIN	BEL	GRE	NZL	ESP	JPN				NC	0

=== JWRC results ===
Year	Entrant	Car	1	2	3	4	5	6	7	8	9	JWRC	Points
2004	Per-Gunnar Andersson	Suzuki Ignis S1600	MON; 8	GRE; Ret	TUR; 1	FIN; 1	GBR; Ret	ITA; 1	ESP; 2			1st	39
2005	Per-Gunnar Andersson	Suzuki Ignis S1600	MON; 6	MEX; 2	ITA; 5	GRE; 1						6th	30
2005	Per-Gunnar Andersson	Suzuki Swift S1600					FIN; Ret	GER; 4	FRA	ESP; Ret		6th	30
2006	Per-Gunnar Andersson	Suzuki Swift S1600	SWE; 1	ESP	FRA	ARG; 3	ITA; 4	GER	FIN; 2	TUR; DSQ	GBR; Ret	3rd	29
2007	Suzuki Sports Europe	Suzuki Swift S1600	NOR; 1	POR; 1	ITA; 2	FIN	GER	ESP; 1	FRA; 4			1st	43

=== SWRC results ===
Year	Entrant	Car	1	2	3	4	5	6	7	8	9	10	SWRC	Points
2010	Per-Gunnar Andersson	Škoda Fabia S2000	SWE; 1										9th†	25†
2010	Rufa Sport	Škoda Fabia S2000		MEX	JOR; 3	NZL	POR; 5	FIN; 2	GER; 3	JPN	FRA	GBR	9th†	25†
2012	Proton Motorsport	Proton Satria Neo S2000	MON; Ret	SWE; 1	POR	NZL; 2	FIN; 1	GBR; 6	FRA; 3	ESP; 2			2nd	109

† Andersson's entrant Rufa Sport failed to compete in the required number of events, meaning all of Andersson's points scored with the team have been annulled. His win in Sweden remains as he competed as a wildcard entrant and not with Rufa.

=== APRC results ===
Year	Entrant	Car	1	2	3	4	5	6	APRC	Points
2012	Proton Motorsport	Proton Satria Neo S2000	NZL; 2	NCL; Ret	AUS; 4	MYS; Ret	JPN	CHN	7th	55

=== Complete FIA European Rallycross Championship results ===
==== Supercar ====
Year	Entrant	Car	1	2	3	4	5	6	7	8	9	10	ERX	Points
2012	Hedströms Motorsport	Škoda Fabia T16	GBR	FRA	AUT	HUN	NOR	SWE; 8	BEL	NED	FIN	GER	28th	9
2014	Hedströms Motorsport	Škoda Fabia	GBR	NOR	BEL	GER; 8	ITA						24th	9

=== Complete FIA World Rallycross Championship results ===
==== Supercar ====
Year	Entrant	Car	1	2	3	4	5	6	7	8	9	10	11	12	13	WRX	Points
2014	Hedtsröms Motorsport	Škoda Fabia	POR	GBR	NOR	FIN	SWE	BEL	CAN	FRA	GER; 13	ITA				37th	8
2014	EKS RX	Audi S1											TUR; 13	ARG		37th	8
2015	Marklund Motorsport	Volkswagen Polo	POR; 6	HOC; 9	BEL; 4	GBR; 13	GER; 14	SWE; 16	CAN	NOR; 5	FRA; 13	BAR	TUR; 20	ITA; 14	ARG	13th	70
2017	EKS RX	Audi S1	BAR	POR	HOC	BEL	GBR	NOR	SWE; 15	CAN	FRA	LAT	GER	RSA		23rd	2

Sporting positions
Preceded by Brice Tirabassi	Junior World Rally Champion; 2004	Succeeded by Dani Sordo
Preceded by Patrik Sandell	Junior World Rally Champion; 2007	Succeeded by Sébastien Ogier
