= 2005 Acropolis Rally =

8th round of the 2005 World Rally Championship

2005 Acropolis Rally 52nd Acropolis Rally of Greece
Round 8 of the 2005 World Rally Championship season
← Previous event	Next event →
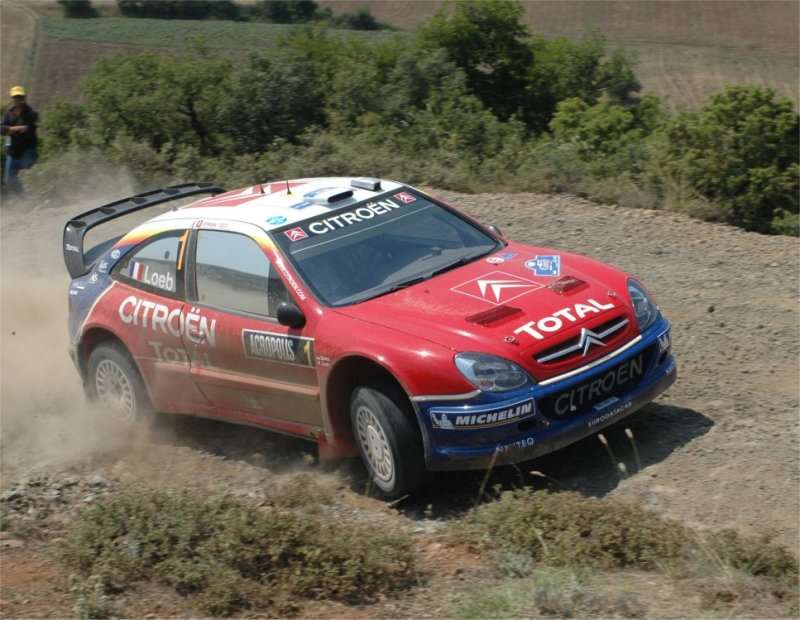
- Rally winner Sébastien Loeb.
- Host country: Greece
- Rally base: Lamia
- Dates run: June 23, 2005 – June 26, 2005
- Stages: 19 (349.57 km; 217.21 miles)
- Stage surface: Gravel
- Overall distance: 1,065.57 km (662.11 miles)

Statistics
- Crews: 88 at start, 54 at finish

Overall results
- Overall winner: (France) Sébastien Loeb (Monaco) Daniel Elena (France) Citroën Total WRT; Citroën Xsara WRC

The 2005 Acropolis Rally (formally the 52nd Acropolis Rally of Greece) was the eighth round of the 2005 World Rally Championship. The rally was held over four days between 23 June and 26 June 2005, and was won by Citroën's Sébastien Loeb, his 16th win in the World Rally Championship and a record-breaking fifth consecutive win.

== Background ==
=== Entry list ===
No.	Driver	Co-Driver	Entrant	Car	Tyre
World Rally Championship manufacturer entries
1	(France) Sébastien Loeb	(Monaco) Daniel Elena	(France) Citroën Total WRT	Citroën Xsara WRC	MI
2	(Spain) Carlos Sainz	(Spain) Marc Martí	(France) Citroën Total WRT	Citroën Xsara WRC	MI
3	(Finland) Toni Gardemeister	(Finland) Jakke Honkanen	(United Kingdom) BP Ford World Rally Team	Ford Focus RS WRC '04	MI
4	(Czech Republic) Roman Kresta	(Czech Republic) Jan Možný	(United Kingdom) BP Ford World Rally Team	Ford Focus RS WRC '04	MI
5	(Norway) Petter Solberg	(United Kingdom) Phil Mills	(Japan) Subaru World Rally Team	Subaru Impreza S11 WRC '05	P
6	(Australia) Chris Atkinson	(Australia) Glenn Macneall	(Japan) Subaru World Rally Team	Subaru Impreza S11 WRC '05	P
7	(Finland) Marcus Grönholm	(Finland) Timo Rautiainen	(France) Marlboro Peugeot Total	Peugeot 307 WRC	P
8	(Estonia) Markko Märtin	(United Kingdom) Michael Park	(France) Marlboro Peugeot Total	Peugeot 307 WRC	P
9	(Finland) Harri Rovanperä	(Finland) Risto Pietiläinen	(Japan) Mitsubishi Motors	Mitsubishi Lancer WRC 05	P
10	(Italy) Gianluigi Galli	(Italy) Guido D'Amore	(Japan) Mitsubishi Motors	Mitsubishi Lancer WRC 05	P
11	(Germany) Armin Schwarz	(Germany) Klaus Wicha	(Czech Republic) Škoda Motorsport	Škoda Fabia WRC	MI
12	(Finland) Janne Tuohino	(Finland) Mikko Markkula	(Czech Republic) Škoda Motorsport	Škoda Fabia WRC	MI
World Rally Championship entries
14	(Austria) Manfred Stohl	(Austria) Ilka Minor	(Belgium) OMV World Rally Team	Citroën Xsara WRC	MI
15	(Norway) Henning Solberg	(Norway) Cato Menkerud	(United Kingdom) BP Ford World Rally Team	Ford Focus RS WRC '04	MI
16	(Sweden) Daniel Carlsson	(Sweden) Mattias Andersson	(Sweden) Rally Team Olsbergs	Subaru Impreza S10 WRC '04	P
17	(Germany) Antony Warmbold	(United Kingdom) Michael Orr	(United Kingdom) BP Ford World Rally Team	Ford Focus RS WRC '04	MI
18	(Finland) Jani Paasonen	(Finland) Jani Vainikka	(Czech Republic) Škoda Motorsport	Škoda Fabia WRC	MI
19	(Spain) Xavier Pons	(Spain) Carlos del Barrio	(Belgium) OMV World Rally Team	Citroën Xsara WRC	MI
20	(United Kingdom) Mark Higgins	(United Kingdom) Trevor Agnew	(United Kingdom) Stobart VK Ford Rally Team	Ford Focus RS WRC '04	P
21	(France) Stéphane Sarrazin	(France) Denis Giraudet	(Japan) Subaru World Rally Team	Subaru Impreza S11 WRC '05	P
22	(Greece) Armodios Vovos	(Greece) Loris Meletopoulos	(Greece) Egnatia Asfalistiki	Subaru Impreza S10 WRC '04	—N/a
23	(Sweden) Tobias Johansson	(Finland) Kaj Lindström	(Sweden) Rally Team Olsbergs	Subaru Impreza S10 WRC '04	P
24	(Finland) Mikko Hirvonen	(Finland) Jarmo Lehtinen	(Finland) Mikko Hirvonen	Ford Focus RS WRC '03	MI
25	(Finland) Kristian Sohlberg	(Finland) Timo Hantunen	(Finland) Red Devil Atolye Kazaz	Subaru Impreza S10 WRC '04	MI
26	(Greece) Ioannis Papadimitriou	(United Kingdom) Allan Harryman	(Greece) Ioannis Papadimitriou	Ford Focus RS WRC '03	—N/a
61	(Greece) Yorgo Philippedes	(United Kingdom) Marshall Clarke	(Greece) Yorgo Philippedes	Škoda Octavia WRC Evo3	—N/a
62	(Greece) Panagiotis Hatzitsopanis	(Greece) Nikolaos Petropoulos	(Greece) Panagiotis Hatzitsopanis	Mitsubishi Lancer Evo VIII	—N/a
63	(Greece) Leonídas Kirkos	(Greece) Giorgos Polizois	(Greece) Leonídas Kirkos	Mitsubishi Lancer Evo VIII	—N/a
JWRC entries
31	(Sweden) Per-Gunnar Andersson	(Sweden) Jonas Andersson	(Sweden) Per-Gunnar Andersson	Suzuki Ignis S1600	P
32	(United Kingdom) Guy Wilks	(United Kingdom) Phil Pugh	(United Kingdom) Guy Wilks	Suzuki Ignis S1600	P
33	(Finland) Kosti Katajamäki	(Finland) Timo Alanne	(Finland) Kosti Katajamäki	Suzuki Ignis S1600	P
34	(San Marino) Mirco Baldacci	(Italy) Giovanni Bernacchini	(San Marino) Mirco Baldacci	Fiat Punto S1600	P
35	(United Kingdom) Kris Meeke	(United Kingdom) Chris Patterson	(United Kingdom) Kris Meeke	Citroën C2 S1600	P
36	(Estonia) Urmo Aava	(Estonia) Kuldar Sikk	(Estonia) Urmo Aava	Suzuki Ignis S1600	P
37	(Italy) Alan Scorcioni	(San Marino) Silvio Stefanelli	(Italy) Alan Scorcioni	Suzuki Ignis S1600	P
38	(Italy) Luca Betti	(Italy) Giovanni Agnese	(Italy) Luca Betti	Renault Clio S1600	P
39	(Italy) Luca Cecchettini	(Italy) Massimo Daddoveri	(Italy) Luca Cecchettini	Fiat Punto S1600	P
40	(Zimbabwe) Conrad Rautenbach	(United Kingdom) Carl Williamson	(Zimbabwe) Conrad Rautenbach	Citroën C2 S1600	P
41	(Spain) Dani Sordo	(Spain) Oriol Julià Pascual	(Spain) Dani Sordo	Citroën C2 S1600	P
43	(Czech Republic) Martin Prokop	(Czech Republic) Petr Gross	(Czech Republic) Martin Prokop	Suzuki Ignis S1600	P

=== Itinerary ===
All dates and times are EEST (UTC+3).

Date	Time	No.	Stage name	Distance
1. leg — 128.06 km
23 June	18:00	SS1	Athens Olympic Stadium	2.40 km
24 June	09:38	SS2	Eleftherohori 1	18.44 km
24 June	10:23	SS3	Rengini 1	11.84 km
24 June	10:56	SS4	Elatia — Zeli 1	32.55 km
24 June	13:40	SS5	Eleftherohori 2	18.44 km
24 June	14:25	SS6	Rengini 2	11.84 km
24 June	14:58	SS7	Elatia — Zeli 2	32.55 km
2. leg — 122.72 km
25 June	09:19	SS8	Koumaritsi 1	7.71 km
25 June	09:39	SS9	Pavliani 1	24.45 km
25 June	10:28	SS10	Stromi 1	14.61 km
25 June	11:41	SS11	Amfissa 1	14.59 km
25 June	14:33	SS12	Koumaritsi 2	7.71 km
25 June	14:53	SS13	Pavliani 2	24.45 km
25 June	15:42	SS14	Stromi 2	14.61 km
25 June	16:55	SS15	Amfissa 2	14.59 km
3. leg — 98.79 km
26 June	08:13	SS16	Dikastro	26.78 km
26 June	09:14	SS17	Grammeni	19.66 km
26 June	11:45	SS18	Pyrgos	34.80 km
26 June	12:43	SS19	Perivoli	17.55 km

== Results ==
=== Overall ===
Pos.	No.	Driver	Co-driver	Team	Car	Time	Difference	Points
1	1	(France) Sébastien Loeb	(Monaco) Daniel Elena	(France) Citroën Total WRT	Citroën Xsara WRC	4:12:53.7		10
2	3	(Finland) Toni Gardemeister	(Finland) Jakke Honkanen	(United Kingdom) BP Ford World Rally Team	Ford Focus RS WRC '04	4:14:29.9	+1:36.2	8
3	2	(Spain) Carlos Sainz	(Spain) Marc Martí	(France) Citroën Total WRT	Citroën Xsara WRC	4:15:04.8	+2:11.1	6
4	7	(Finland) Marcus Grönholm	(Finland) Timo Rautiainen	(France) Marlboro Peugeot Total	Peugeot 307 WRC	4:15:50.1	+2:56.4	5
5	24	(Finland) Mikko Hirvonen	(Finland) Jarmo Lehtinen	(Finland) Mikko Hirvonen	Ford Focus RS WRC '03	4:16:06.9	+3:13.2	4
6	9	(Finland) Harri Rovanperä	(Finland) Risto Pietiläinen	(Japan) Mitsubishi Motors	Mitsubishi Lancer WRC 05	4:16:38.1	+3:44.4	3
7	10	(Italy) Gianluigi Galli	(Italy) Guido D'Amore	(Japan) Mitsubishi Motors	Mitsubishi Lancer WRC 05	4:18:13.3	+5:19.6	2
8	8	(Estonia) Markko Märtin	(United Kingdom) Michael Park	(France) Marlboro Peugeot Total	Peugeot 307 WRC	4:18:31.2	+5:37.5	1

=== World Rally Cars ===
==== Classification ====
Position		No.	Driver	Co-driver	Entrant	Car	Time	Difference	Points
Event	Class	No.	Driver	Co-driver	Entrant	Car	Time	Difference	Points
1	1	1	(France) Sébastien Loeb	(Monaco) Daniel Elena	(France) Citroën Total WRT	Citroën Xsara WRC	4:12:53.7		10
2	2	3	(Finland) Toni Gardemeister	(Finland) Jakke Honkanen	(United Kingdom) BP Ford World Rally Team	Ford Focus RS WRC '04	4:14:29.9	+1:36.2	8
3	3	2	(Spain) Carlos Sainz	(Spain) Marc Martí	(France) Citroën Total WRT	Citroën Xsara WRC	4:15:04.8	+2:11.1	6
4	4	7	(Finland) Marcus Grönholm	(Finland) Timo Rautiainen	(France) Marlboro Peugeot Total	Peugeot 307 WRC	4:15:50.1	+2:56.4	5
6	5	9	(Finland) Harri Rovanperä	(Finland) Risto Pietiläinen	(Japan) Mitsubishi Motors	Mitsubishi Lancer WRC 05	4:16:38.1	+3:44.4	3
7	6	10	(Italy) Gianluigi Galli	(Italy) Guido D'Amore	(Japan) Mitsubishi Motors	Mitsubishi Lancer WRC 05	4:18:13.3	+5:19.6	2
8	7	8	(Estonia) Markko Märtin	(United Kingdom) Michael Park	(France) Marlboro Peugeot Total	Peugeot 307 WRC	4:18:31.2	+5:37.5	1
9	8	5	(Norway) Petter Solberg	(United Kingdom) Phil Mills	(Japan) Subaru World Rally Team	Subaru Impreza S11 WRC '05	4:18:56.7	+6:03.0	0
18	9	11	(Germany) Armin Schwarz	(Germany) Klaus Wicha	(Czech Republic) Škoda Motorsport	Škoda Fabia WRC	4:44:54.1	+32:00.4	0
Retired SS17		4	(Czech Republic) Roman Kresta	(Czech Republic) Jan Možný	(United Kingdom) BP Ford World Rally Team	Ford Focus RS WRC '04	Mechanical		0
Retired SS7		6	(Australia) Chris Atkinson	(Australia) Glenn Macneall	(Japan) Subaru World Rally Team	Subaru Impreza S11 WRC '05	Engine		0
Retired SS3		12	(Finland) Janne Tuohino	(Finland) Mikko Markkula	(Czech Republic) Škoda Motorsport	Škoda Fabia WRC	Mechanical		0

==== Special stages ====
Day	Stage	Stage name	Length	Winner	Car	Time	Class leaders
1. leg (23 Jun)	SS1	Athens Olympic Stadium	2.40 km	(France) Sébastien Loeb	Citroën Xsara WRC	2:15.4	(France) Sébastien Loeb
1. leg (24 Jun)	SS2	Eleftherohori 1	18.44 km	(Finland) Marcus Grönholm	Peugeot 307 WRC	11:07.7	(Finland) Marcus Grönholm
1. leg (24 Jun)	SS3	Rengini 1	11.84 km	(Finland) Mikko Hirvonen	Ford Focus RS WRC '03	8:33.2	(Finland) Marcus Grönholm
1. leg (24 Jun)	SS4	Elatia — Zeli 1	32.55 km	(France) Sébastien Loeb	Citroën Xsara WRC	21:50.9	(Finland) Mikko Hirvonen
1. leg (24 Jun)	SS5	Eleftherohori 2	18.44 km	(Finland) Marcus Grönholm	Peugeot 307 WRC	10:54.0	(Finland) Marcus Grönholm
1. leg (24 Jun)	SS6	Rengini 2	11.84 km	(Spain) Carlos Sainz	Citroën Xsara WRC	8:21.5	(Finland) Marcus Grönholm
1. leg (24 Jun)	SS7	Elatia — Zeli 2	32.55 km	(France) Sébastien Loeb	Citroën Xsara WRC	21:10.6	(France) Sébastien Loeb
2. leg (25 Jun)	SS8	Koumaritsi 1	7.71 km	(France) Sébastien Loeb	Citroën Xsara WRC	4:56.1	(France) Sébastien Loeb
2. leg (25 Jun)	SS9	Pavliani 1	24.45 km	(France) Sébastien Loeb	Citroën Xsara WRC	19:33.9	(France) Sébastien Loeb
2. leg (25 Jun)	SS10	Stromi 1	14.61 km	(France) Sébastien Loeb	Citroën Xsara WRC	11:31.0	(France) Sébastien Loeb
2. leg (25 Jun)	SS11	Amfissa 1	14.59 km	(France) Sébastien Loeb	Citroën Xsara WRC	9:14.1	(France) Sébastien Loeb
2. leg (25 Jun)	SS12	Koumaritsi 2	7.71 km	(France) Sébastien Loeb	Citroën Xsara WRC	4:52.1	(France) Sébastien Loeb
2. leg (25 Jun)	SS13	Pavliani 2	24.45 km	(France) Sébastien Loeb	Citroën Xsara WRC	19:22.2	(France) Sébastien Loeb
2. leg (25 Jun)	SS14	Stromi 2	14.61 km	(France) Sébastien Loeb	Citroën Xsara WRC	11:20.6	(France) Sébastien Loeb
2. leg (25 Jun)	SS15	Amfissa 2	14.59 km	(France) Sébastien Loeb	Citroën Xsara WRC	9:01.2	(France) Sébastien Loeb
3. leg (26 Jun)	SS16	Dikastro	26.78 km	(Finland) Toni Gardemeister	Ford Focus RS WRC '04	21:00.4	(France) Sébastien Loeb
3. leg (26 Jun)	SS17	Grammeni	19.66 km	(France) Sébastien Loeb	Citroën Xsara WRC	14:23.4	(France) Sébastien Loeb
3. leg (26 Jun)	SS18	Pyrgos	34.80 km	(Finland) Mikko Hirvonen	Ford Focus RS WRC '03	27:48.1	(France) Sébastien Loeb
3. leg (26 Jun)	SS19	Perivoli	17.55 km	(Finland) Mikko Hirvonen	Ford Focus RS WRC '03	14:54.2	(France) Sébastien Loeb

==== Championship standings ====
Pos.	Drivers' championships			Co-drivers' championships			Manufacturers' championships		
Pos.	Move	Driver	Points	Move	Co-driver	Points	Move	Manufacturer	Points
1		(France) Sébastien Loeb	65		(Monaco) Daniel Elena	65	1	(France) Citroën Total WRT	84
2		(Norway) Petter Solberg	42		(United Kingdom) Phil Mills	42	1	(France) Marlboro Peugeot Total	79
3	2	(Finland) Toni Gardemeister	39	2	(Finland) Jakke Honkanen	39		(United Kingdom) BP Ford World Rally Team	57
4	1	(Estonia) Markko Märtin	39	1	(United Kingdom) Michael Park	39		(Japan) Subaru World Rally Team	47
5	1	(Finland) Marcus Grönholm	37	1	(Finland) Timo Rautiainen	37		(Japan) Mitsubishi Motors	37

=== Junior World Rally Championship ===
==== Classification ====
Position		No.	Driver	Co-driver	Entrant	Car	Time	Difference	Points
Event	Class	No.	Driver	Co-driver	Entrant	Car	Time	Difference	Points
15	1	31	(Sweden) Per-Gunnar Andersson	(Sweden) Jonas Andersson	(Sweden) Per-Gunnar Andersson	Suzuki Ignis S1600	4:41:21.4		10
17	2	32	(United Kingdom) Guy Wilks	(United Kingdom) Phil Pugh	(United Kingdom) Guy Wilks	Suzuki Ignis S1600	4:44:11.8	+2:50.4	8
19	3	36	(Estonia) Urmo Aava	(Estonia) Kuldar Sikk	(Estonia) Urmo Aava	Suzuki Ignis S1600	4:44:57.0	+3:35.6	6
21	4	33	(Finland) Kosti Katajamäki	(Finland) Timo Alanne	(Finland) Kosti Katajamäki	Suzuki Ignis S1600	4:50:00.5	+8:39.1	5
22	5	34	(San Marino) Mirco Baldacci	(Italy) Giovanni Bernacchini	(San Marino) Mirco Baldacci	Fiat Punto S1600	4:51:12.6	+9:51.2	4
26	6	35	(United Kingdom) Kris Meeke	(United Kingdom) Chris Patterson	(United Kingdom) Kris Meeke	Citroën C2 S1600	4:56:36.7	+15:15.3	3
27	7	43	(Czech Republic) Martin Prokop	(Czech Republic) Petr Gross	(Czech Republic) Martin Prokop	Suzuki Ignis S1600	5:00:14.2	+18:52.8	2
28	8	40	(Zimbabwe) Conrad Rautenbach	(United Kingdom) Carl Williamson	(Zimbabwe) Conrad Rautenbach	Citroën C2 S1600	5:01:09.6	+19:48.2	1
36	9	37	(Italy) Alan Scorcioni	(San Marino) Silvio Stefanelli	(Italy) Alan Scorcioni	Suzuki Ignis S1600	5:22:11.8	+40:50.4	0
Retired SS18		38	(Italy) Luca Betti	(Italy) Giovanni Agnese	(Italy) Luca Betti	Renault Clio S1600	Gearbox		0
Retired SS18		41	(Spain) Dani Sordo	(Spain) Oriol Julià Pascual	(Spain) Dani Sordo	Citroën C2 S1600	Gearbox		0
Retired SS2		39	(Italy) Luca Cecchettini	(Italy) Massimo Daddoveri	(Italy) Luca Cecchettini	Fiat Punto S1600	Engine mounting		0

==== Special stages ====
Day	Stage	Stage name	Length	Winner	Car	Time	Class leaders
1. leg (23 Jun)	SS1	Athens Olympic Stadium	2.40 km	(United Kingdom) Guy Wilks	Suzuki Ignis S1600	2:26.9	(United Kingdom) Guy Wilks
1. leg (24 Jun)	SS2	Eleftherohori 1	18.44 km	(Sweden) Per-Gunnar Andersson	Suzuki Ignis S1600	12:20.4	(Sweden) Per-Gunnar Andersson
1. leg (24 Jun)	SS3	Rengini 1	11.84 km	(Sweden) Per-Gunnar Andersson	Suzuki Ignis S1600	9:22.8	(Sweden) Per-Gunnar Andersson
1. leg (24 Jun)	SS4	Elatia — Zeli 1	32.55 km	(Sweden) Per-Gunnar Andersson	Suzuki Ignis S1600	24:00.8	(Sweden) Per-Gunnar Andersson
1. leg (24 Jun)	SS5	Eleftherohori 2	18.44 km	(United Kingdom) Guy Wilks	Suzuki Ignis S1600	12:21.2	(Sweden) Per-Gunnar Andersson
1. leg (24 Jun)	SS6	Rengini 2	11.84 km	(Sweden) Per-Gunnar Andersson	Suzuki Ignis S1600	9:19.7	(Sweden) Per-Gunnar Andersson
1. leg (24 Jun)	SS7	Elatia — Zeli 2	32.55 km	(Sweden) Per-Gunnar Andersson	Suzuki Ignis S1600	23:47.9	(Sweden) Per-Gunnar Andersson
2. leg (25 Jun)	SS8	Koumaritsi 1	7.71 km	(United Kingdom) Kris Meeke	Citroën C2 S1600	5:32.8	(Sweden) Per-Gunnar Andersson
2. leg (25 Jun)	SS9	Pavliani 1	24.45 km	(Estonia) Urmo Aava	Suzuki Ignis S1600	21:26.5	(Sweden) Per-Gunnar Andersson
2. leg (25 Jun)	SS10	Stromi 1	14.61 km	(Sweden) Per-Gunnar Andersson	Suzuki Ignis S1600	12:55.7	(Sweden) Per-Gunnar Andersson
2. leg (25 Jun)	SS11	Amfissa 1	14.59 km	(United Kingdom) Kris Meeke	Citroën C2 S1600	10:12.4	(Sweden) Per-Gunnar Andersson
2. leg (25 Jun)	SS12	Koumaritsi 2	7.71 km	(Spain) Dani Sordo	Citroën C2 S1600	5:27.3	(Sweden) Per-Gunnar Andersson
2. leg (25 Jun)	SS13	Pavliani 2	24.45 km	(Sweden) Per-Gunnar Andersson	Suzuki Ignis S1600	21:20.8	(Sweden) Per-Gunnar Andersson
2. leg (25 Jun)	SS14	Stromi 2	14.61 km	(Spain) Dani Sordo	Citroën C2 S1600	12:47.2	(Sweden) Per-Gunnar Andersson
2. leg (25 Jun)	SS15	Amfissa 2	14.59 km	(San Marino) Mirco Baldacci	Fiat Punto S1600	10:04.7	(Sweden) Per-Gunnar Andersson
3. leg (26 Jun)	SS16	Dikastro	26.78 km	(United Kingdom) Kris Meeke	Citroën C2 S1600	23:06.4	(Sweden) Per-Gunnar Andersson
3. leg (26 Jun)	SS17	Grammeni	19.66 km	(United Kingdom) Guy Wilks	Suzuki Ignis S1600	15:54.0	(Sweden) Per-Gunnar Andersson
3. leg (26 Jun)	SS18	Pyrgos	34.80 km	(United Kingdom) Guy Wilks	Suzuki Ignis S1600	30:19.6	(Sweden) Per-Gunnar Andersson
3. leg (26 Jun)	SS19	Perivoli	17.55 km	(United Kingdom) Guy Wilks	Suzuki Ignis S1600	16:27.3	(Sweden) Per-Gunnar Andersson

==== Championship standings ====
Pos.	Drivers' championships		
Pos.	Move	Driver	Points
1	3	(Sweden) Per-Gunnar Andersson	25
2	1	(United Kingdom) Guy Wilks	23
3	2	(United Kingdom) Kris Meeke	19
4	2	(Spain) Dani Sordo	15
5	2	(Estonia) Urmo Aava	14
