= 2005 Rally d'Italia Sardegna =

5th round of the 2005 World Rally Championship

2005 Rally d'Italia Sardegna 2nd Supermag Rally Italia Sardinia
Round 5 of the 2005 World Rally Championship season
← Previous event	Next event →
- Host country: Italy
- Rally base: Olbia
- Dates run: April 29, 2005 – May 1, 2005
- Stages: 17 (349.08 km; 216.91 miles)
- Stage surface: Gravel
- Overall distance: 1,130.17 km (702.26 miles)

Statistics
- Crews: 66 at start, 42 at finish

Overall results
- Overall winner: (France) Sébastien Loeb (Monaco) Daniel Elena (France) Citroën Total WRT; Citroën Xsara WRC

The 2005 Rally d'Italia Sardegna (formally the 2nd Supermag Rally Italia Sardinia) was the fifth round of the 2005 World Rally Championship. The rally was held over three days between 29 April and 1 May 2005, and was won by Citroën's Sébastien Loeb, his 13th win in the World Rally Championship.

== Background ==
=== Entry list ===
No.	Driver	Co-Driver	Entrant	Car	Tyre
World Rally Championship manufacturer entries
1	(France) Sébastien Loeb	(Monaco) Daniel Elena	(France) Citroën Total WRT	Citroën Xsara WRC	M
2	(Belgium) François Duval	(Belgium) Stéphane Prévot	(France) Citroën Total WRT	Citroën Xsara WRC	M
3	(Finland) Toni Gardemeister	(Finland) Jakke Honkanen	(United Kingdom) BP Ford World Rally Team	Ford Focus RS WRC '04	M
4	(Czech Republic) Roman Kresta	(Czech Republic) Jan Možný	(United Kingdom) BP Ford World Rally Team	Ford Focus RS WRC '04	M
5	(Norway) Petter Solberg	(United Kingdom) Phil Mills	(Japan) Subaru World Rally Team	Subaru Impreza S11 WRC '05	P
6	(Australia) Chris Atkinson	(Australia) Glenn Macneall	(Japan) Subaru World Rally Team	Subaru Impreza S11 WRC '05	P
7	(Finland) Marcus Grönholm	(Finland) Timo Rautiainen	(France) Marlboro Peugeot Total	Peugeot 307 WRC	P
8	(Estonia) Markko Märtin	(United Kingdom) Michael Park	(France) Marlboro Peugeot Total	Peugeot 307 WRC	P
9	(Finland) Harri Rovanperä	(Finland) Risto Pietiläinen	(Japan) Mitsubishi Motors	Mitsubishi Lancer WRC 05	P
10	(Italy) Gianluigi Galli	(Italy) Guido D'Amore	(Japan) Mitsubishi Motors	Mitsubishi Lancer WRC 05	P
11	(Germany) Armin Schwarz	(Germany) Klaus Wicha	(Czech Republic) Škoda Motorsport	Škoda Fabia WRC	M
12	(Finland) Janne Tuohino	(Finland) Mikko Markkula	(Czech Republic) Škoda Motorsport	Škoda Fabia WRC	M
World Rally Championship entries
14	(Norway) Henning Solberg	(Norway) Cato Menkerud	(United Kingdom) BP Ford World Rally Team	Ford Focus RS WRC '04	M
15	(Austria) Manfred Stohl	(Austria) Ilka Minor	(Belgium) OMV World Rally Team	Citroën Xsara WRC	M
16	(Germany) Antony Warmbold	(United Kingdom) Michael Orr	(United Kingdom) BP Ford World Rally Team	Ford Focus RS WRC '04	M
18	(Sweden) Daniel Carlsson	(Sweden) Mattias Andersson	(Sweden) Rally Team Olsbergs	Subaru Impreza S10 WRC '04	P
19	(France) Stéphane Sarrazin	(France) Denis Giraudet	(Japan) Subaru World Rally Team	Subaru Impreza S11 WRC '05	P
20	(Finland) Mikko Hirvonen	(Finland) Jarmo Lehtinen	(Finland) Mikko Hirvonen	Ford Focus RS WRC '03	M
21	(Finland) Juuso Pykälistö	(Finland) Mika Ovaskainen	(Belgium) OMV World Rally Team	Citroën Xsara WRC	M
37	(United Kingdom) Mark Higgins	(United Kingdom) Trevor Agnew	(United Kingdom) Mark Higgins	Ford Focus RS WRC '04	P
32	(Spain) Xavier Pons	(Spain) Oriol Julià Pascual	(France) Bozian Racing	Peugeot 206 WRC	M
21	(Sweden) Tobias Johansson	(Finland) Kaj Lindström	(Sweden) Rally Team Olsbergs	Subaru Impreza S10 WRC '04	P
26	(United Kingdom) Nigel Heath	(United Kingdom) Steve Lancaster	(United Kingdom) Nigel Heath	Škoda Fabia WRC	P
27	(Italy) Riccardo Errani	(Italy) Stefano Casadio	(Italy) Riccardo Errani	Škoda Octavia WRC	P
28	(Italy) Giovanni Recordati	(Monaco) Freddy Delorme	(Italy) Giovanni Recordati	Toyota Corolla WRC	—N/a
JWRC entries
31	(Sweden) Per-Gunnar Andersson	(Sweden) Jonas Andersson	(Sweden) Per-Gunnar Andersson	Suzuki Ignis S1600	P
32	(United Kingdom) Guy Wilks	(United Kingdom) Phil Pugh	(United Kingdom) Guy Wilks	Suzuki Ignis S1600	P
33	(Finland) Kosti Katajamäki	(Finland) Timo Alanne	(Finland) Kosti Katajamäki	Suzuki Ignis S1600	P
34	(San Marino) Mirco Baldacci	(Italy) Giovanni Bernacchini	(San Marino) Mirco Baldacci	Fiat Punto S1600	P
35	(United Kingdom) Kris Meeke	(United Kingdom) Chris Patterson	(United Kingdom) Kris Meeke	Citroën C2 S1600	P
36	(Estonia) Urmo Aava	(Estonia) Kuldar Sikk	(Estonia) Urmo Aava	Suzuki Ignis S1600	P
37	(Italy) Alan Scorcioni	(San Marino) Silvio Stefanelli	(Italy) Alan Scorcioni	Suzuki Ignis S1600	P
38	(Italy) Luca Betti	(Italy) Giovanni Agnese	(Italy) Luca Betti	Renault Clio S1600	P
39	(Italy) Luca Cecchettini	(Italy) Massimo Daddoveri	(Italy) Luca Cecchettini	Fiat Punto S1600	P
40	(Zimbabwe) Conrad Rautenbach	(United Kingdom) Carl Williamson	(Zimbabwe) Conrad Rautenbach	Citroën C2 S1600	P
41	(Spain) Dani Sordo	(Spain) Marc Martí	(Spain) Dani Sordo	Citroën C2 S1600	P
42	(Czech Republic) Pavel Valoušek	(Italy) Pierangelo Scalvini	(Czech Republic) Pavel Valoušek	Suzuki Ignis S1600	P
43	(Czech Republic) Martin Prokop	(Czech Republic) Petr Gross	(Czech Republic) Martin Prokop	Suzuki Ignis S1600	P

=== Itinerary ===
All dates and times are CEST (UTC+2).

Date	Time	No.	Stage name	Distance
1. leg — 137.82 km
29 April	08:53	SS1	Terranova 1	29.81 km
29 April	10:09	SS2	Crastazza 1	20.54 km
29 April	10:48	SS3	Mamone 1	18.56 km
29 April	14:24	SS4	Terranova 2	29.81 km
29 April	15:40	SS5	Crastazza 2	20.54 km
29 April	16:19	SS6	Mamone 2	18.56 km
2. leg — 144.08 km
30 April	09:38	SS7	Loelle 1	30.72 km
30 April	10:34	SS8	Tandalò 1	38.77 km
30 April	14:09	SS9	Lovia Avra	5.10 km
30 April	15:51	SS10	Loelle 2	30.72 km
30 April	16:47	SS11	Tandalò 2	38.77 km
3. leg — 67.18 km
1 May	07:16	SS12	S. Giacomo 1	12.69 km
1 May	08:29	SS13	S. Bachisio 1	9.40 km
1 May	09:02	SS14	Bortigiadas 1	11.50 km
1 May	10:36	SS15	S. Bachisio 2	9.40 km
1 May	11:09	SS16	Bortigiadas 2	11.50 km
1 May	12:52	SS17	S. Giacomo 2	12.69 km

== Results ==
=== Overall ===
Pos.	No.	Driver	Co-driver	Team	Car	Time	Difference	Points
1	1	(France) Sébastien Loeb	(Monaco) Daniel Elena	(France) Citroën Total WRT	Citroën Xsara WRC	4:06:33.7		10
2	5	(Norway) Petter Solberg	(United Kingdom) Phil Mills	(Japan) Subaru World Rally Team	Subaru Impreza S11 WRC '05	4:07:33.3	+59.6	8
3	7	(Finland) Marcus Grönholm	(Finland) Timo Rautiainen	(France) Marlboro Peugeot Total	Peugeot 307 WRC	4:09:41.0	+3:07.3	6
4	8	(Estonia) Markko Märtin	(United Kingdom) Michael Park	(France) Marlboro Peugeot Total	Peugeot 307 WRC	4:10:46.0	+4:12.3	5
5	3	(Finland) Toni Gardemeister	(Finland) Jakke Honkanen	(United Kingdom) BP Ford World Rally Team	Ford Focus RS WRC '04	4:15:03.0	+8:29.3	4
6	4	(Czech Republic) Roman Kresta	(Czech Republic) Jan Možný	(United Kingdom) BP Ford World Rally Team	Ford Focus RS WRC '04	4:16:02.9	+9:29.2	3
7	16	(Germany) Antony Warmbold	(United Kingdom) Michael Orr	(United Kingdom) BP Ford World Rally Team	Ford Focus RS WRC '04	4:16:33.5	+9:59.8	2
8	21	(Finland) Juuso Pykälistö	(Finland) Mika Ovaskainen	(Belgium) OMV World Rally Team	Citroën Xsara WRC	4:16:54.9	+10:21.2	1

=== World Rally Cars ===
==== Classification ====
Position		No.	Driver	Co-driver	Entrant	Car	Time	Difference	Points
Event	Class	No.	Driver	Co-driver	Entrant	Car	Time	Difference	Points
1	1	1	(France) Sébastien Loeb	(Monaco) Daniel Elena	(France) Citroën Total WRT	Citroën Xsara WRC	4:06:33.7		10
2	2	5	(Norway) Petter Solberg	(United Kingdom) Phil Mills	(Japan) Subaru World Rally Team	Subaru Impreza S11 WRC '05	4:07:33.3	+59.6	8
3	3	7	(Finland) Marcus Grönholm	(Finland) Timo Rautiainen	(France) Marlboro Peugeot Total	Peugeot 307 WRC	4:09:41.0	+3:07.3	6
4	4	8	(Estonia) Markko Märtin	(United Kingdom) Michael Park	(France) Marlboro Peugeot Total	Peugeot 307 WRC	4:10:46.0	+4:12.3	5
5	5	3	(Finland) Toni Gardemeister	(Finland) Jakke Honkanen	(United Kingdom) BP Ford World Rally Team	Ford Focus RS WRC '04	4:15:03.0	+8:29.3	4
6	6	4	(Czech Republic) Roman Kresta	(Czech Republic) Jan Možný	(United Kingdom) BP Ford World Rally Team	Ford Focus RS WRC '04	4:16:02.9	+9:29.2	3
11	7	2	(Belgium) François Duval	(Belgium) Stéphane Prévot	(France) Citroën Total WRT	Citroën Xsara WRC	4:20:03.5	+13:29.8	0
13	8	12	(Finland) Janne Tuohino	(Finland) Mikko Markkula	(Czech Republic) Škoda Motorsport	Škoda Fabia WRC	4:22:04.3	+15:30.6	0
18	9	6	(Australia) Chris Atkinson	(Australia) Glenn Macneall	(Japan) Subaru World Rally Team	Subaru Impreza S11 WRC '05	4:38:33.3	+31:59.6	0
Retired SS14		9	(Finland) Harri Rovanperä	(Finland) Risto Pietiläinen	(Japan) Mitsubishi Motors	Mitsubishi Lancer WRC 05	Gearbox		0
Retired SS13		10	(Italy) Gianluigi Galli	(Italy) Guido D'Amore	(Japan) Mitsubishi Motors	Mitsubishi Lancer WRC 05	Gearbox		0
Retired SS12		11	(Germany) Armin Schwarz	(Germany) Klaus Wicha	(Czech Republic) Škoda Motorsport	Škoda Fabia WRC	Excluded - illegal help		0

==== Special stages ====
Day	Stage	Stage name	Length	Winner	Car	Time	Class leaders
1. leg (29 Apr)	SS1	Terranova 1	29.81 km	(Finland) Marcus Grönholm	Peugeot 307 WRC	21:47.9	(Finland) Marcus Grönholm
1. leg (29 Apr)	SS2	Crastazza 1	20.54 km	(France) Sébastien Loeb	Citroën Xsara WRC	13:22.8	(Finland) Marcus Grönholm
1. leg (29 Apr)	SS3	Mamone 1	18.56 km	(France) Sébastien Loeb	Citroën Xsara WRC	12:43.8	(France) Sébastien Loeb
1. leg (29 Apr)	SS4	Terranova 2	29.81 km	(Finland) Marcus Grönholm	Peugeot 307 WRC	21:15.1	(France) Sébastien Loeb
1. leg (29 Apr)	SS5	Crastazza 2	20.54 km	(France) Sébastien Loeb	Citroën Xsara WRC	12:55.5	(France) Sébastien Loeb
1. leg (29 Apr)	SS6	Mamone 2	18.56 km	(France) Sébastien Loeb	Citroën Xsara WRC	12:23.6	(France) Sébastien Loeb
2. leg (30 Apr)	SS7	Loelle 1	30.72 km	(France) Sébastien Loeb	Citroën Xsara WRC	19:46.9	(France) Sébastien Loeb
2. leg (30 Apr)	SS8	Tandalò 1	38.77 km	(Norway) Petter Solberg	Subaru Impreza S11 WRC '05	28:09.0	(France) Sébastien Loeb
2. leg (30 Apr)	SS9	Lovia Avra	5.10 km	(Italy) Gianluigi Galli	Mitsubishi Lancer WRC 05	3:40.1	(France) Sébastien Loeb
2. leg (30 Apr)	SS10	Loelle 2	30.72 km	(France) Sébastien Loeb	Citroën Xsara WRC	19:33.8	(France) Sébastien Loeb
2. leg (30 Apr)	SS11	Tandalò 2	38.77 km	(France) Sébastien Loeb	Citroën Xsara WRC	27:37.4	(France) Sébastien Loeb
3. leg (1 May)	SS12	S. Giacomo 1	12.69 km	(France) Sébastien Loeb	Citroën Xsara WRC	10:31.6	(France) Sébastien Loeb
3. leg (1 May)	SS13	S. Bachisio 1	9.40 km	(Finland) Marcus Grönholm	Peugeot 307 WRC	8:13.0	(France) Sébastien Loeb
3. leg (1 May)	SS14	Bortigiadas 1	11.50 km	(Norway) Petter Solberg	Subaru Impreza S11 WRC '05	7:40.7	(France) Sébastien Loeb
3. leg (1 May)	SS15	S. Bachisio 2	9.40 km	(Norway) Petter Solberg	Subaru Impreza S11 WRC '05	8:00.9	(France) Sébastien Loeb
3. leg (1 May)	SS16	Bortigiadas 2	11.50 km	(Australia) Chris Atkinson	Subaru Impreza S11 WRC '05	7:30.5	(France) Sébastien Loeb
3. leg (1 May)	SS17	S. Giacomo 2	12.69 km	(Norway) Petter Solberg	Subaru Impreza S11 WRC '05	10:23.1	(France) Sébastien Loeb

==== Championship standings ====
Pos.	Drivers' championships			Co-drivers' championships			Manufacturers' championships		
Pos.	Move	Driver	Points	Move	Co-driver	Points	Move	Manufacturer	Points
1	1	(France) Sébastien Loeb	35	1	(Monaco) Daniel Elena	35		(France) Marlboro Peugeot Total	54
2	1	(Norway) Petter Solberg	34	1	(United Kingdom) Phil Mills	34		(France) Citroën Total WRT	43
3		(Estonia) Markko Märtin	28		(United Kingdom) Michael Park	28		(Japan) Subaru World Rally Team	36
4		(Finland) Marcus Grönholm	26		(Finland) Timo Rautiainen	26		(United Kingdom) BP Ford World Rally Team	33
5		(Finland) Toni Gardemeister	24		(Finland) Jakke Honkanen	24		(Japan) Mitsubishi Motors	24

=== Junior World Rally Championship ===
==== Classification ====
Position		No.	Driver	Co-driver	Entrant	Car	Time	Difference	Points
Event	Class	No.	Driver	Co-driver	Entrant	Car	Time	Difference	Points
17	1	41	(Spain) Dani Sordo	(Spain) Marc Martí	(Spain) Dani Sordo	Citroën C2 S1600	4:35:13.4		10
19	2	36	(Estonia) Urmo Aava	(Estonia) Kuldar Sikk	(Estonia) Urmo Aava	Suzuki Ignis S1600	4:38:47.3	+3:33.9	8
20	3	35	(United Kingdom) Kris Meeke	(United Kingdom) Chris Patterson	(United Kingdom) Kris Meeke	Citroën C2 S1600	4:39:07.4	+3:54.0	6
21	4	38	(Italy) Luca Betti	(Italy) Giovanni Agnese	(Italy) Luca Betti	Renault Clio S1600	4:43:57.9	+8:44.5	5
22	5	31	(Sweden) Per-Gunnar Andersson	(Sweden) Jonas Andersson	(Sweden) Per-Gunnar Andersson	Suzuki Ignis S1600	4:53:48.0	+18:34.6	4
23	6	32	(United Kingdom) Guy Wilks	(United Kingdom) Phil Pugh	(United Kingdom) Guy Wilks	Suzuki Ignis S1600	4:56:48.1	+21:34.7	3
24	7	43	(Czech Republic) Martin Prokop	(Czech Republic) Petr Gross	(Czech Republic) Martin Prokop	Suzuki Ignis S1600	5:00:05.3	+24:51.9	2
27	8	40	(Zimbabwe) Conrad Rautenbach	(United Kingdom) Carl Williamson	(Zimbabwe) Conrad Rautenbach	Citroën C2 S1600	5:03:31.7	+28:18.3	1
28	9	42	(Czech Republic) Pavel Valoušek	(Italy) Pierangelo Scalvini	(Czech Republic) Pavel Valoušek	Suzuki Ignis S1600	5:04:26.3	+29:12.9	0
Retired SS16		34	(San Marino) Mirco Baldacci	(Italy) Giovanni Bernacchini	(San Marino) Mirco Baldacci	Fiat Punto S1600	Differential		0
Retired SS16		39	(Italy) Luca Cecchettini	(Italy) Massimo Daddoveri	(Italy) Luca Cecchettini	Fiat Punto S1600	Differential		0
Retired SS13		33	(Finland) Kosti Katajamäki	(Finland) Timo Alanne	(Finland) Kosti Katajamäki	Suzuki Ignis S1600	Accident		0
Retired SS12		37	(Italy) Alan Scorcioni	(San Marino) Silvio Stefanelli	(Italy) Alan Scorcioni	Suzuki Ignis S1600	Retired		0

==== Special stages ====
Day	Stage	Stage name	Length	Winner	Car	Time	Class leaders
1. leg (29 Apr)	SS1	Terranova 1	29.81 km	(Finland) Kosti Katajamäki	Suzuki Ignis S1600	23:50.8	(Finland) Kosti Katajamäki
1. leg (29 Apr)	SS2	Crastazza 1	20.54 km	(Sweden) Per-Gunnar Andersson	Suzuki Ignis S1600	14:48.4	(Finland) Kosti Katajamäki
1. leg (29 Apr)	SS3	Mamone 1	18.56 km	(United Kingdom) Kris Meeke	Citroën C2 S1600	13:42.8	(Finland) Kosti Katajamäki
1. leg (29 Apr)	SS4	Terranova 2	29.81 km	(Spain) Dani Sordo	Citroën C2 S1600	23:29.2	(Finland) Kosti Katajamäki
1. leg (29 Apr)	SS5	Crastazza 2	20.54 km	(Spain) Dani Sordo	Citroën C2 S1600	14:27.2	(Finland) Kosti Katajamäki
1. leg (29 Apr)	SS6	Mamone 2	18.56 km	(Spain) Dani Sordo	Citroën C2 S1600	13:37.8	(Finland) Kosti Katajamäki
2. leg (30 Apr)	SS7	Loelle 1	30.72 km	Notional stage time			(Finland) Kosti Katajamäki
2. leg (30 Apr)	SS8	Tandalò 1	38.77 km	(United Kingdom) Kris Meeke	Citroën C2 S1600	30:59.8	(United Kingdom) Kris Meeke
2. leg (30 Apr)	SS9	Lovia Avra	5.10 km	(Spain) Dani Sordo	Citroën C2 S1600	4:02.8	(United Kingdom) Kris Meeke
2. leg (30 Apr)	SS10	Loelle 2	30.72 km	(Spain) Dani Sordo	Citroën C2 S1600	21:32.3	(United Kingdom) Kris Meeke
2. leg (30 Apr)	SS11	Tandalò 2	38.77 km	(Spain) Dani Sordo	Citroën C2 S1600	30:41.9	(Spain) Dani Sordo
3. leg (1 May)	SS12	S. Giacomo 1	12.69 km	(Sweden) Per-Gunnar Andersson	Suzuki Ignis S1600	11:42.7	(Spain) Dani Sordo
3. leg (1 May)	SS13	S. Bachisio 1	9.40 km	(Sweden) Per-Gunnar Andersson	Suzuki Ignis S1600	8:54.2	(Spain) Dani Sordo
3. leg (1 May)	SS14	Bortigiadas 1	11.50 km	(Sweden) Per-Gunnar Andersson	Suzuki Ignis S1600	8:25.6	(Spain) Dani Sordo
3. leg (1 May)	SS15	S. Bachisio 2	9.40 km	(Sweden) Per-Gunnar Andersson	Suzuki Ignis S1600	8:38.0	(Spain) Dani Sordo
3. leg (1 May)	SS16	Bortigiadas 2	11.50 km	(Sweden) Per-Gunnar Andersson	Suzuki Ignis S1600	8:14.1	(Spain) Dani Sordo
3. leg (1 May)	SS17	S. Giacomo 2	12.69 km	(United Kingdom) Kris Meeke	Citroën C2 S1600	11:30.8	(Spain) Dani Sordo

==== Championship standings ====
Pos.	Drivers' championships		
Pos.	Move	Driver	Points
1	2	(United Kingdom) Kris Meeke	16
2	6	(Spain) Dani Sordo	15
3	2	(United Kingdom) Guy Wilks	15
4	2	(Sweden) Per-Gunnar Andersson	15
5	4	(Italy) Luca Betti	9
