= 2013 Monte Carlo Rally =

Car rally

2013 Monte Carlo Rally 81ème Rallye Automobile Monte-Carlo
Round 1 of 13 of the 2013 World Rally Championship
Next event →
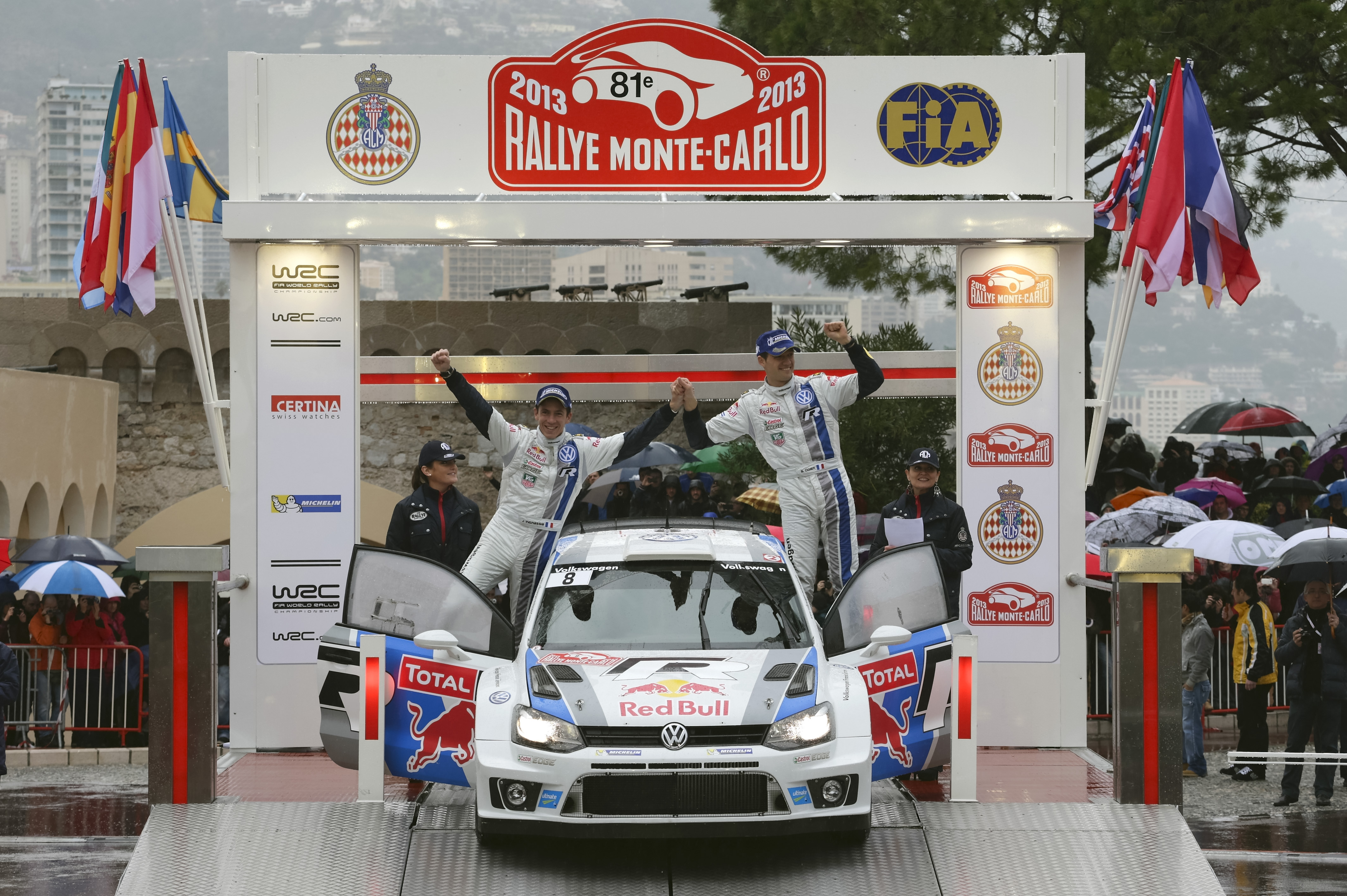
- Sébastien Ogier during Podium
- Host country: Monaco
- Rally base: (France) Valence, Rhône-Alpes
- Dates run: 15 – 20 January 2013
- Stages: 18 (478.42 km; 297.28 miles)
- Stage surface: Tarmac and snow
- Overall distance: 1,820.72 km (1,131.34 miles)

Statistics
- Crews: 73 at start, 45 at finish

Overall results
- Overall winner: (France) Sébastien Loeb (Monaco) Daniel Elena (France) Citroën Total Abu Dhabi WRT; 5:18:57.2

The 2013 Monte Carlo Rally (formally known as the 81ème Rallye Automobile Monte-Carlo) was a motor racing event for rally cars that was held over four days between 16 and 19 January, and marked the eighty-first running of the Monte Carlo Rally. After the ceremonial start in Monte Carlo, the rally was based in the French town of Valence. The rally itself was contested over eighteen special stages in the French provinces of Rhône-Alpes and Provence-Alpes-Côte d'Azur, covering a total of 468.42 km (291.06 mi) in competitive stages.

The rally was the first round of the 2013 World Rally Championship season, and marked the fortieth anniversary of the World Rally Championship; the 1973 event was the opening round of the championship in its inaugural season. Thirteen World Rally Car crews were entered in the event, including the defending World Drivers' Champion Sébastien Loeb, prior to the start a six-time winner of the Monte Carlo Rally.

The event was run in difficult conditions, with teams reporting during preparations for the event that the stages were subject to the heaviest snowfalls since the 2000 season. The rally was won by Sébastien Loeb, the seventy-seventh of his career and his seventh victory on the Rallye Monte Carlo. The Volkswagen Polo R WRC scored a podium on its competitive debut in the hands of Sébastien Ogier, with Dani Sordo completing the podium in a Citroën DS3 WRC.

== Entry list ==
Entries for the rally closed on 14 December 2012, and were published one week later. Eighty-four entries were received, with seventy-three teams starting the event. Thirteen World Rally Cars started the event, as did eight entries in the newly formed WRC-2 championship for cars built to Group N and Super 2000 regulations, and three teams eligible to score points in the WRC-3 championship for two-wheel drive cars.

Notable entrants
No.	Entrant	Class	Driver	Co-driver	Car	Tyre
1	(France) Citroën Total Abu Dhabi WRT	WRC	(France) Sébastien Loeb	(Monaco) Daniel Elena	Citroën DS3 WRC	M
2	(France) Citroën Total Abu Dhabi WRT	WRC	(Finland) Mikko Hirvonen	(Finland) Jarmo Lehtinen	Citroën DS3 WRC	M
4	(United Kingdom) Qatar M-Sport WRT	WRC	(Norway) Mads Østberg	(Sweden) Jonas Andersson	Ford Fiesta RS WRC	M
5	(United Kingdom) Qatar M-Sport WRT	WRC	(Russia) Evgeny Novikov	(Austria) Ilka Minor	Ford Fiesta RS WRC	M
6	(United Kingdom) Qatar World Rally Team	WRC	(Finland) Juho Hänninen	(Finland) Tomi Tuominen	Ford Fiesta RS WRC	M
7	(Germany) Volkswagen Motorsport	WRC	(Finland) Jari-Matti Latvala	(Finland) Miikka Anttila	Volkswagen Polo R WRC	M
8	(Germany) Volkswagen Motorsport	WRC	(France) Sébastien Ogier	(France) Julien Ingrassia	Volkswagen Polo R WRC	M
10	(France) Abu Dhabi Citroën Total WRT	WRC	(Spain) Dani Sordo	(Spain) Carlos del Barrio	Citroën DS3 WRC	M
11	(United Kingdom) Qatar World Rally Team	WRC	(Belgium) Thierry Neuville	(Belgium) Nicolas Gilsoul	Ford Fiesta RS WRC	M
12	(Italy) Lotos Team WRC	WRC	(Poland) Michał Kościuszko	(Poland) Maciej Szczepaniak	Mini John Cooper Works WRC	D
21	(Czech Republic) Jipocar Czech National Team	WRC	(Czech Republic) Martin Prokop	(Czech Republic) Michal Ernst	Ford Fiesta RS WRC	D
22	(France) Bryan Bouffier	WRC	(France) Bryan Bouffier	(France) Xavier Panseri	Citroën DS3 WRC	M
24	(France) Julien Maurin	WRC	(France) Julien Maurin	(France) Nicolas Klinger	Ford Fiesta RS WRC	M
31	(Czech Republic) Škoda Motorsport	WRC-2	(Finland) Esapekka Lappi	(Finland) Janne Ferm	Škoda Fabia S2000	M
32	(Germany) Škoda Auto Deutschland	WRC-2	(Germany) Sepp Wiegand	(Germany) Frank Christian	Škoda Fabia S2000	M
33	(Austria) Stohl Racing	WRC-2	(Germany) Armin Kremer	(Germany) Klaus Wicha	Subaru Impreza	M
34	(Belgium) Symtech Racing	WRC-2	(Italy) Luca Betti	(Italy) Francesco Pezzoli	Peugeot 207 S2000	M
36	(United Arab Emirates) Skydive Dubai Rally Team	WRC-2	(United Arab Emirates) Rashid al Ketbi	(Germany) Karina Hepperle	Škoda Fabia S2000	D
37	(Italy) Lorenzo Bertelli	WRC-2	(Italy) Lorenzo Bertelli	(Italy) Lorenzo Granai	Subaru Impreza	M
38	(Mexico) Moto Club Igualda	WRC-2	(Mexico) Ricardo Triviño	(Spain) Àlex Haro	Mitsubishi Lancer Evolution X	M
39	(Belgium) Symtech Racing	WRC-2	(Ukraine) Yuriy Protasov	(Estonia) Kuldar Sikk	Subaru Impreza R4	M
51	(France) Sébastien Chardonnet	WRC-3	(France) Sébastien Chardonnet	(France) Thibault de la Haye	Citroën DS3 R3T	M
52	(France) Quentin Gilbert	WRC-3	(France) Quentin Gilbert	(France) Isabelle Galmiche	Citroën DS3 R3T	M
53	(France) Saintéloc Racing	WRC-3	(France) Renaud Poutot	(France) Ludovic Viragh	Citroën DS3 R3T	M

Icon	Class
WRC	WRC entries eligible to score manufacturer points
WRC	Major entry ineligible to score manufacturer points
WRC-2	Registered to take part in WRC-2 championship
WRC-3	Registered to take part in WRC-3 championship

== Itinerary ==
The itinerary for the 2013 rally remained relatively unchanged from previous years. The first day of the rally was made up of four special stages to the south and west of the rally base in Valence. Le Moulinon—Antraigues was the first and longest stage—at 37.10 km (23.05 mi)—of the rally, and was made up of narrow and twisty roads that climb the Col de la Fayolle, before the road widens for a fast descent. This was followed by Burzet—St. Martial, consisting of a series of long technical sections through a forest that opens up onto narrow roads that are exposed to the prevailing weather conditions. Both stages were contested for a second time later that afternoon. Both Le Moulinon—Antraigues and Burzet—St. Martial were modified from the 2012 route, having been extended slightly. This first leg of the rally was also the longest, covering some 135.40 km (84.13 mi) of competitive stages.

The second leg of the rally was made up of three stages to the north and west of Valence: Labatie d'Andaure—Lalouvesc, St. Bonnet—St. Julien Molhesabate—St. Bonnet and Lamastre—Gilhoc—Alboussière. Labatie d'Andaure—Lalouvesc was characterised by a long climb up the mountainside that became increasingly technical as it went on. St. Bonnet—St. Julien Molhesabate—St. Bonnet both started and finished in the commune of St. Bonnet, encircling a valley with fast, open roads at high altitude. Finally, Lamastre—Gilhoc—Alboussière was a fast and narrow descent that levelled out halfway through as it wound through open farmland. As with the first day of the rally, these three stages were contested twice; once in the morning and again in the afternoon. Similarly, the stages had all minor adjustments from the 2012 route.

The third day of the rally was the shortest at 92.00 km (57.17 mi). This leg of the rally also featured the most changes to the route. The Cimetiere de Vassieux—Col de Gaudissart and Montauban-sur-l'Ouvèze—Eygalayes stages that have been used in recent years were not contested in 2012; instead, the cars travelled east and south of Valence for the St. Jean-en-Royans—La Cime Du Mas stage, which follows a difficult route across the contours of three mountain peaks. Although a regular feature of the rally route, the 2012 route used a version of St. Jean-en-Royans—La Cime Du Mas that had not been featured since 1997. The cars returned to Valence for repairs at midday before contesting St. Nazaire le Desert—La Motte Chalancon and Sisteron—Thoard in the afternoon, both of which returned to the event after an extended absence. St. Nazaire le Desert—La Motte Chalancon was last used in 2009 as a round of the Intercontinental Rally Challenge when it was run in the opposite direction to the planned route for 2012, which follows narrow, twisty roads across a mountain ridge, passing through several small villages as it reaches a mountain pass over a kilometre above sea level. Sisteron—Thoard had not featured in the route since 2002, featuring 36.70 km (22.80 mi) of difficult mountain climbs, undulating technical sequences and fast, open stretches at higher altitudes.

The fourth and final leg of the rally was made up of five stages. This formed the longest overall day of competition, with the stages in the Provence-Alpes-Côte d'Azur region, close to the Italian border. The first of these stages, Moulinet—La Bollene Vesubie (also known as the Col de Turini) was contested three times; twice in the afternoon, and once at night. The stage is famous for its endless series of hairpin bends, and steep inclines throughout the stage. The second stage, Lantosque—Lucéram, was also run twice across relatively flat terrain before climbing over a mountain ridge and descending to the commune of Lucéram. The second running of the stage formed the "Power Stage" of the rally. This concept, introduced in 2011, awards bonus World Championship points to the three fastest drivers through the stage.

=== In detail ===
Itinerary of special stages
Time (UTC+1)	Stage number	Stage name	Surface	Length (in km)	Length (in mi)
Shakedown — 15 January
8:00	P1	Plateau Lautagne 1	Tarmac	3.58 km	2.22 mi
9:00	P2	Plateau Lautagne 2	Tarmac	3.58 km	2.22 mi
10:00	P3	Plateau Lautagne 2	Tarmac	3.58 km	2.22 mi
11:00	Private	Plateau Lautagne 4	Tarmac	3.58 km	2.22 mi
18:00	—N/a	Ceremonial start — Champs de Mars, Valence	—N/a	—N/a	—N/a
Leg 1 — 16 January
9:03	SS1	Le Moulinon—Antraigues 1	Tarmac	37.10 km	23.05 mi
10:21	SS2	Burzet—St. Martial 1	Tarmac	30.60 km	19.01 mi
12:46	—N/a	Service A — Valence	—N/a	—N/a	—N/a
14:21	SS3	Le Moulinon—Antraigues 2	Tarmac	37.10 km	23.05 mi
15:39	SS4	Burzet—St. Martial 2	Tarmac	30.60 km	19.01 mi
17:59	—N/a	Flexi Service B — Valence	—N/a	—N/a	—N/a
18:37	—N/a	Parc fermé — Valence	—N/a	—N/a	—N/a
Leg 2 — 17 January
7:55	—N/a	Service C — Valence	—N/a	—N/a	—N/a
9:33	SS5	Labatie d'Andaure—Lalouvesc 1	Tarmac	19.08 km	11.86 mi
10:14	SS6	St. Bonnet—St. Julien Molhesabate—St. Bonnet 1	Tarmac	25.45 km	15.81 mi
11:37	SS7	Lamastre—Gilhoc—Alboussiere 1	Tarmac	21.72 km	13.50 mi
12:57	—N/a	Service D — Valence	—N/a	—N/a	—N/a
14:50	SS8	Labatie d'Andaure—Lalouvesc 2	Tarmac	19.08 km	11.86 mi
15:31	SS9	St. Bonnet—St. Julien Molhesabate—St. Bonnet 2	Tarmac	25.45 km	15.81 mi
16:54	SS10	Lamastre—Gilhoc—Alboussiere 2	Tarmac	21.72 km	13.50 mi
18:19	—N/a	Flexi Service E — Valence	—N/a	—N/a	—N/a
19:00	—N/a	Parc fermé — Valence	—N/a	—N/a	—N/a

Itinerary of special stages
Time (UTC+1)	Stage number	Stage name	Surface	Length (in km)	Length (in mi)
Leg 3 — 18 January
7:50	—N/a	Service F — Valence	—N/a	—N/a	—N/a
9:08	SS11	St. Jean-en-Royans—La Cime du Mas	Tarmac	33.19 km	20.62 mi
11:23	—N/a	Service G — Valence	—N/a	—N/a	—N/a
13:31	SS12	St. Nazaire le Desert—La Motte Chalancon	Tarmac	22.11 km	13.74 mi
15:29	SS13	Sisteron—Thoard	Tarmac	36.70 km	22.80 mi
19:32	—N/a	Parc fermé — Monaco	—N/a	—N/a	—N/a
Leg 4 — 19 January
13:15	—N/a	Service H — Monaco	—N/a	—N/a	—N/a
15:11	SS14	Moulinet—La Bollene Vesubie 1	Tarmac	23.45 km	14.57 mi
15:54	SS15	Lantosque—Lucéram 1	Tarmac	18.95 km	11.77 mi
17:12	SS16	Moulinet—La Bollene Vesubie 2	Tarmac	23.45 km	14.57 mi
19:17	—N/a	Service I — Monaco	—N/a	—N/a	—N/a
20:58	SS17	Moulinet—La Bollene Vesubie 3	Tarmac	23.45 km	14.57 mi
**21:41**	**SS18**	**Lantosque—Lucéram 2**	**Tarmac**	**18.95 km**	**11.77 mi**
22:56	—N/a	Service J — Monaco	—N/a	—N/a	—N/a
23:09	—N/a	Parc fermé — Monaco	—N/a	—N/a	—N/a
Post-event — 20 January
11:00	—N/a	Finish ceremony — Prince's Palace of Monaco	—N/a	—N/a	—N/a

Key
Icon	Meaning
	Special stage
	Service park
	Parc fermé
**Bold**	Power stage

== Report ==
=== Leg 1 ===
The opening stages of the rally presented a challenge to the drivers. Where the first pass through Le Moulinon—Antraigues was mostly dry, the Burzet—St. Martial stage was covered in snow, making tyre choice critical. With the cars running in the order that they finished the 2012 season, Sébastien Loeb was the first driver through the stages, and on his arrival at the end of Le Moulinon—Antraigues it was observed that the dry conditions had torn the studs free of his front tyres. This would become a problem that all of the leading teams would be faced with. Nevertheless, Loeb set the early pace, finishing the stage seventeen seconds ahead of team-mate Mikko Hirvonen and looked unchallenged until Sébastien Ogier set a stage time that was three and a half second faster, giving the Volkswagen Polo R WRC a stage win on the very first stage it contested. Meanwhile, Jari-Matti Latvala in the second Polo R, arrived late at a time control checkpoint before the second stage, and received a thirty-second penalty. Ogier and Loeb maintained their momentum through the snowy Burzet—St. Martial stage, but Loeb took the rally lead from Ogier by seven seconds. Dani Sordo, in the third works-supported Citroën DS3 WRC, retained third place despite a fast time from Juho Hänninen in the Qatar World Rally Team Fiesta RS that saw him pick up two places overall.

Following the service park in Valence, the cars returned to Le Moulinon—Antraigues, where Loeb continued to build on his lead, finishing the stage twelve seconds faster than Latvala, who after some initial teething problems had gained confidence in the Polo R. Sordo was once again third, whilst Hirvonen took fourth back from Hänninen. Ogier finished the stage fifth to be twenty-six and a half seconds behind Loeb. The second pass over Burzet—St. Martial was dry, as the cars had swept the stage of snow during the first run over the stage. The difference was so significant that Loeb set a stage time four minutes faster than the time he recorded in the morning. Hirvonen finished second, some thirty-four seconds slower, to capture third overall from Sordo. Mads Østberg finished the stage third ahead of Ogier, while Latvala finished fifth, recovering to fifth place overall after running as low as ninth during the morning stages. Burzet—St. Martial also claimed the first retirement among the World Rally Cars when Thierry Neuville broke the suspension on his Fiesta RS, coming to a halt less than a kilometre from the spot he retired in 2012.

The opening leg of the rally was also marked by technical troubles in the timing logs, with errors in the system falsely recording Loeb as stopping on the first stage. The problem was rectified when Citroën shut off the Global Positioning System tracking devices installed in the cars driven by Loeb and Dani Sordo, but it was some time before organisers were able to confirm the results at the end of the day. Loeb finished the final stage with a lead of one minute and twenty seconds over Ogier, with Hirvonen third, a further twenty-six seconds behind.

=== Leg 2 ===
Conditions during the second leg were more consistent than on the first, but considerably colder, with snow recorded on all three stages. Sébastien Ogier recovered five seconds from overnight leader Sébastien Loeb on the first pass through Labatie d'Andaure—Lalouvesc, but team-mate Jari-Matti Latvala struggled once again and lost fifth place to Evgeny Novikov, who went on to set the fastest time through St. Bonnet—St. Julien Molhesabate—St. Bonnet, ahead of Mads Østberg and Juho Hänninen to give Ford the three fastest times of the stage. Novikov took his second stage win on Lamastre—Gilhoc—Alboussiere, while Loeb and Ogier duelled back and forth throughout the morning, taking several seconds away from each other across the three stages. Meanwhile, a difficult day saw Lotos Team WRC's Michał Kościuszko end the first leg in twenty-first position overall, and he spent most of the morning stages recovering, running as high as sixteenth before crashing his Mini John Cooper Works WRC on St. Bonnet—St. Julien Molhesabate—St. Bonnet. Despite extensive damage to the rear of his car, he was able to continue to the midday service.

During the afternoon stages, Loeb won the second pass over Labatie d'Andaure—Lalouvesc and there was no movement among the leading competitors in the overall standings. Juho Hänninen took his maiden stage win on the second running of St. Bonnet—St. Julien Molhesabate—St. Bonnet, six seconds ahead of Novikov who was a further six seconds ahead of Loeb. Loeb and Ogier returned to the top of the timing sheets for the final stage of the leg, the second running of Lamastre—Gilhoc—Alboussiere. Latvala finished third to close within twenty seconds of Hirvonen in fifth overall, whilst Julien Maurin in a privately entered Ford Fiesta RS WRC was forced out when he had an accident on the stage.

=== Leg 3 ===
Sébastien Loeb won his eighth stage of the rally as the cars resumed the third leg, finishing St. Jean-en-Royans—La Cime du Mas a second and a half faster than Sébastien Ogier, while Evgeny Novikov finished the stage fourth to take a further seven seconds from Dani Sordo. 2011 winner Bryan Bouffier lost over a minute in his privately entered Citroën DS3 WRC when he spun late in the stage, losing eighth place to Mads Østberg, who later took his first stage win at the WRC level on St. Nazaire le Desert—La Motte Chalancon. Novikov finished the stage second, further closing the gap to Sordo, before finally catching him on Sisteron—Thoard. At the end of the leg, Loeb held a lead of one minute and forty-seven seconds over Ogier, who sat a minute and a half ahead of Novikov. Sordo was fourth, less than two seconds behind the Russian, while Jari-Matti Latvala finally felt comfortable with his Polo R WRC, setting the second-fastest time on Sisteron—Thoard and moving up into fifth place overall. Mikko Hirvonen slipped further down the order to sixth place, expressing dissatisfaction with his car, having developed a chronic understeer problem.

=== Leg 4 ===
The final leg of the rally quickly claimed three scalps during the first pass of the famous Col de Turini stage. Evgeny Novikov crashed halfway through the stage, and despite his efforts to continue, the damage was terminal; Jari-Matti Latvala slid off the road, and was unable to rejoin the route, forcing him out; and Juho Hänninen developed a mechanical problem that brought his Ford Fiesta RS WRC to a halt. Bryan Bouffier was the surprise winner of the stage ahead of Mads Østberg in the sole surviving Fiesta and Sébastien Ogier. With Novikov out, Dani Sordo reclaimed third place and scored his only stage win of the rally on stage fifteen. Further down the order, Michał Kościuszko passed WRC-2 entrant Armin Kremer to move up into the points-scoring positions in tenth, which the Polish driver would hold onto for the remainder of the rally.

Sébastien Loeb won the next stage, which would ultimately prove to be the last of the rally. Following the final service in Monaco, rally organisers decided to cancel the final two stages after they were overwhelmed with spectators. Loeb therefore won the rally, one minute and thirty-nine seconds ahead of Ogier, with Sordo in third. Mikko Hirvonen took fourth, whilst a difficult final stage for Østberg saw him lose fifth place to Bouffier. Martin Prokop took advantage of the retirements early in the day to secure seventh, ahead of Sepp Wiegand in the first of the WRC-2 entries.

=== WRC-2 ===
Esapekka Lappi established an early lead in the newly created WRC-2 category, but his lead was short-lived when he hit a rock on the first pass through Le Moulinon—Antraigues. Despite setting the fastest time of the stage, his Škoda Fabia S2000 was too badly damaged to continue, and he was forced to retire. He was joined in retirement by Peugeot 207 S2000 driver Luca Betti, who ran off the road on the same stage. Sepp Wiegand, also driving a Škoda Fabia S2000, inherited the lead and held a one-minute advantage over Armin Kremer by the end of the first day. Wiegand consolidated his lead on the second day, extending his lead over Kremer to four minutes when he won all six stages of Leg 2. Wiegand had a scare on the third day, when his battery shorted out on St. Nazaire le Desert—La Motte Chalancon, but he was able to pull over and repair the problem, finishing the day with a lead of nearly five minutes. A late charge from Armin Kremer on the final leg of the rally was not enough to overthrow Wiegand, who won the category and was classified eighth overall. Kremer finished second, with Ukrainian Yuiry Protasov in third.

=== WRC-3 ===
Three entries were received for the WRC-3 championship, but only two cars started the event when French driver Quentin Gilbert lost his drivers' licence shortly before the event began. Of the two remaining entries, Renaud Poutot in a Citroën DS3 built to R3T regulations established a one-minute lead over Sébastien Chardonnet in another DS3 during the first day. Poutot ended the first day in twentieth position, with Chardonnet in twenty-second and the two separated by Lotos Team WRC driver Michał Kościuszko. Poutot's rally came to an end on stage nine when he slid off the road and into a snowbank. He was unable to get his car started, and retired on the spot, leaving Chardonnet as the sole remaining WRC-3 entry. Needing only to finish to score a full twenty-five points, Chardonnet drove cautiously throughout the remainder of the rally, and was ultimately classified thirteenth overall, forty-five minutes behind rally winner Sébastien Loeb.

== Results ==
=== Event standings ===
Pos.	No.	Driver	Co-driver	Team	Car	Class	Time	Difference	Overall points	WRC 2 / 3 Points
Overall classification
1	1	(France) Sébastien Loeb	(Monaco) Daniel Elena	(France) Citroën Total Abu Dhabi WRT	Citroën DS3 WRC	WRC	5:18:57.2	+0:00.0	25	
2	8	(France) Sébastien Ogier	(France) Julien Ingrassia	(Germany) Volkswagen Motorsport	Volkswagen Polo R WRC	WRC	5:20:37.1	+1:39.9	18	
3	10	(Spain) Dani Sordo	(Spain) Carlos del Barrio	(France) Abu Dhabi Citroën Total WRT	Citroën DS3 WRC	WRC	5:22:46.2	+3:49.0	15	
4	2	(Finland) Mikko Hirvonen	(Finland) Jarmo Lehtinen	(France) Citroën Total Abu Dhabi WRT	Citroën DS3 WRC	WRC	5:24:23.5	+5:26.3	12	
5	22	(France) Bryan Bouffier	(France) Xavier Panseri	(France) Bryan Bouffier	Citroën DS3 WRC	WRC	5:27:10.3	+8:13.1	10	
6	4	(Norway) Mads Østberg	(Sweden) Jonas Andersson	(United Kingdom) Qatar M-Sport WRT	Ford Fiesta RS WRC	WRC	5:31:00.9	+12:03.7	8	
7	21	(Czech Republic) Martin Prokop	(Czech Republic) Michal Ernst	(Czech Republic) Jipocar Czech National Team	Ford Fiesta RS WRC	WRC	5:42:24.5	+23:27.3	6	
8	32	(Germany) Sepp Wiegand	(Germany) Frank Christian	(Germany) Škoda Auto Deutschland	Škoda Fabia S2000	WRC-2	5:48:31.7	+29:34.5	4	25 (WRC 2)
9	42	(Switzerland) Olivier Burri	(Switzerland) André Saucy	(Switzerland) Olivier Burri	Peugeot 207 S2000	—N/a	5:54:35.4	+35:38.2	2	
10	12	(Poland) Michał Kościuszko	(Poland) Maciej Szczepaniak	(Italy) Lotos Team WRC	Mini John Cooper Works WRC	WRC	5:55:25.2	+36:28.0	1	
11	33	(Germany) Armin Kremer	(Germany) Klaus Wicha	(Austria) Stohl Racing	Subaru Impreza	WRC-2	5:56:57.5	+38:00.3		18 (WRC 2)
12	39	(Ukraine) Yuriy Protasov	(Estonia) Kuldar Sikk	(Belgium) Symtech Racing	Subaru Impreza	WRC-2	5:59:53.0	+40:55.8		15 (WRC 2)
13	51	(France) Sébastien Chardonnet	(France) Thibault de la Haye	(France) Sébastien Chardonnet	Citroën DS3 R3T	WRC-3	6:04:28.2	+45:31.0		25 (WRC 3)
17	36	(United Arab Emirates) Rashid al Ketbi	(Germany) Karina Hepperle	(United Arab Emirates) Skydive Dubai Rally Team	Škoda Fabia S2000	WRC-2	6:14:30.2	+55:33.0		12 (WRC 2)
29	38	(Mexico) Ricardo Triviño	(Spain) Àlex Haro	(Mexico) Moto Club Igualda	Mitsubishi Lancer Evolution X	WRC-2	6:36:58.3	+1:18:01.1		10 (WRC 2)

=== Notable retirements ===
Unlike other rallies in the World Championship, the Monte Carlo Rally does not employ "Rally 2" regulations, which allow a retired driver to re-enter the event at the start of the next leg. Because of this, any retirement from the event is permanent.

Stage	No.	Driver	Co-driver	Team	Car	Class	Cause
—	52	(France) Quentin Gilbert	(France) Isabelle Galmiche	(France) Quentin Gilbert	Citroën DS3 R3T	WRC-3	Withdrawn before start
SS2	31	(Finland) Esapekka Lappi	(Finland) Janne Ferm	(Czech Republic) Škoda Motorsport	Škoda Fabia S2000	WRC-2	Accident damage
SS2	34	(Italy) Luca Betti	(Italy) Francesco Pezzoli	(Belgium) Symtech Racing	Peugeot 207 S2000	WRC-2	Off-road
SS4	11	(Belgium) Thierry Neuville	(Belgium) Nicolas Gilsoul	(United Kingdom) Qatar World Rally Team	Ford Fiesta RS WRC	WRC	Accident damage
SS9	53	(France) Renaud Poutot	(France) Ludovic Viragh	(France) Sainteloc	Citroën DS3 R3T	WRC-3	Off-road
SS10	24	(France) Julien Maurin	(France) Nicolas Klinger	(France) Julien Maurin	Ford Fiesta RS WRC	WRC	Accident
SS14	7	(Finland) Jari-Matti Latvala	(Finland) Miikka Anttila	(Germany) Volkswagen Motorsport	Volkswagen Polo R WRC	WRC	Off-road
SS14	5	(Russia) Evgeny Novikov	(Austria) Ilka Minor	(United Kingdom) Qatar M-Sport World Rally Team	Ford Fiesta RS WRC	WRC	Accident damage
SS14	6	(Finland) Juho Hänninen	(Finland) Tomi Tuominen	(United Kingdom) Qatar World Rally Team	Ford Fiesta RS WRC	WRC	Mechanical
SS14	37	(Italy) Lorenzo Bertelli	(Italy) Lorenzo Granai	(Italy) Lorenzo Bertelli	Subaru Impreza	WRC-2	Mechanical

=== Special stages ===
Day	Stage number	Stage name	Length	Stage winner	Car No.	Team	Time	Avg. spd.	Rally leader
Leg 1 (16 Jan)	SS1	Le Moulinon—Antraigues 1	37.10 km	(France) Sébastien Ogier (France) Julien Ingrassia	8	(Germany) Volkswagen Motorsport	27:31.8	80.89 km/h	(France) Sébastien Ogier (France) Julien Ingrassia
Leg 1 (16 Jan)	SS2	Burzet—St. Martial 1	30.60 km	(France) Sébastien Loeb (Monaco) Daniel Elena	1	(France) Citroën Total Abu Dhabi WRT	25:02.7	73.34 km/h	(France) Sébastien Loeb (Monaco) Daniel Elena
Leg 1 (16 Jan)	SS3	Le Moulinon—Antraigues 2	37.10 km	(France) Sébastien Loeb (Monaco) Daniel Elena	1	(France) Citroën Total Abu Dhabi WRT	25:16.2	88.09 km/h	(France) Sébastien Loeb (Monaco) Daniel Elena
Leg 1 (16 Jan)	SS4	Burzet—St. Martial 2	30.60 km	(France) Sébastien Loeb (Monaco) Daniel Elena	1	(France) Citroën Total Abu Dhabi WRT	21:54.6	83.80 km/h	(France) Sébastien Loeb (Monaco) Daniel Elena
Leg 2 (17 Jan)	SS5	Labatie d'Andaure—Lalouvesc 1	19.08 km	(France) Sébastien Ogier (France) Julien Ingrassia	8	(Germany) Volkswagen Motorsport	14:22.3	79.68 km/h	(France) Sébastien Loeb (Monaco) Daniel Elena
Leg 2 (17 Jan)	SS6	St. Bonnet—St. Julien Molhesabate—St. Bonnet 1	25.45 km	(Russia) Evgeny Novikov (Austria) Ilka Minor	5	(United Kingdom) Qatar M-Sport WRT	18:02.8	84.67 km/h	(France) Sébastien Loeb (Monaco) Daniel Elena
Leg 2 (17 Jan)	SS7	Lamastre—Gilhoc—Alboussiere 1	21.72 km	(Russia) Evgeny Novikov (Austria) Ilka Minor	5	(United Kingdom) Qatar M-Sport WRT	17:07.5	76.13 km/h	(France) Sébastien Loeb (Monaco) Daniel Elena
Leg 2 (17 Jan)	SS8	Labatie d'Andaure—Lalouvesc 2	19.08 km	(France) Sébastien Loeb (Monaco) Daniel Elena	1	(France) Citroën Total Abu Dhabi WRT	13:10.1	86.95 km/h	(France) Sébastien Loeb (Monaco) Daniel Elena
Leg 2 (17 Jan)	SS9	St. Bonnet—St. Julien Molhesabate—St. Bonnet 2	25.45 km	(Finland) Juho Hänninen (Finland) Tomi Tuominen	6	(United Kingdom) Qatar World Rally Team	17:33.2	86.99 km/h	(France) Sébastien Loeb (Monaco) Daniel Elena
Leg 2 (17 Jan)	SS10	Lamastre—Gilhoc—Alboussiere 2	21.72 km	(France) Sébastien Loeb (Monaco) Daniel Elena	1	(France) Citroën Total Abu Dhabi WRT	15:43.0	82.55 km/h	(France) Sébastien Loeb (Monaco) Daniel Elena
Leg 3 (18 Jan)	SS11	St. Jean-en-Royans—La Cime du Mas	33.19 km	(France) Sébastien Loeb (Monaco) Daniel Elena	1	(France) Citroën Total Abu Dhabi WRT	20:17.9	98.17 km/h	(France) Sébastien Loeb (Monaco) Daniel Elena
Leg 3 (18 Jan)	SS12	St. Nazaire le Desert—La Motte Chalancon	22.11 km	(Norway) Mads Østberg (Sweden) Jonas Andersson	4	(United Kingdom) Qatar M-Sport WRT	15:29.5	87.56 km/h	(France) Sébastien Loeb (Monaco) Daniel Elena
Leg 3 (18 Jan)	SS13	Sisteron—Thoard	36.70 km	(France) Sébastien Loeb (Monaco) Daniel Elena	1	(France) Citroën Total Abu Dhabi WRT	24:17.9	90.67 km/h	(France) Sébastien Loeb (Monaco) Daniel Elena
Leg 4 (19 Jan)	SS14	Moulinet—La Bollene Vesubie 1	23.45 km	(France) Bryan Bouffier (France) Xavier Panseri	22	(France) Bryan Bouffier	23:56.9	58.75 km/h	(France) Sébastien Loeb (Monaco) Daniel Elena
Leg 4 (19 Jan)	SS15	Lantosque—Lucéram 1	30.60 km	(Spain) Dani Sordo (Spain) Carlos del Barrio	10	(France) Abu Dhabi Citroën Total WRT	15:02.7	122.12 km/h	(France) Sébastien Loeb (Monaco) Daniel Elena
Leg 4 (19 Jan)	SS16	Moulinet—La Bollene Vesubie 2	23.45 km	(France) Sébastien Loeb (Monaco) Daniel Elena	1	(France) Citroën Total Abu Dhabi WRT	22:08.8	63.56 km/h	(France) Sébastien Loeb (Monaco) Daniel Elena
Leg 4 (19 Jan)	SS17	Moulinet—La Bollene Vesubie 3	23.45 km	stages cancelled					(France) Sébastien Loeb (Monaco) Daniel Elena
Leg 4 (19 Jan)	SS18	Lantosque—Lucéram 2 (Power stage)	18.95 km	stages cancelled					(France) Sébastien Loeb (Monaco) Daniel Elena
Day	Stage number	Stage name	Length	Stage winner	Car No.	Team	Time	Avg. spd.	Rally leader

==== Power stage ====
The "Power stage" of the rally was to be held on an 18.95 km (11.77 mi) stage between the communes of Lantosque and Lucéram in the region of Provence-Alpes-Côte d'Azur, with additional World Championship points to be awarded to the three fastest drivers. However, the stage was cancelled at the last minute due to overwhelming spectator numbers blocking access to the stage, and no points were awarded.
