= Citroën World Rally Team results =

The table below shows all results of Citroën World Rally Team in World Rally Championship.

== WRC results ==
=== Group B era ===
| Year | Entrant | Car | Driver | 1 | 2 | 3 | 4 | 5 | 6 | 7 | 8 | 9 | 10 | 11 | 12 | 13 | WDC | Points | WMC | Points |
|---|---|---|---|---|---|---|---|---|---|---|---|---|---|---|---|---|---|---|---|---|
| 1986 | Citroën Competition | Citroën BX 4TC | (France) Jean-Claude Andruet | MON; Ret | SWE; 6 | POR | KEN | FRA | GRE; Ret | NZL | ARG | FIN | CIV | ITA | GBR | USA | 36th | 6 | 10th | 10 |
| 1986 | Citroën Competition | Citroën BX 4TC | (France) Philippe Wambergue | MON; Ret | SWE; Ret | POR | KEN | FRA | GRE; Ret | NZL | ARG | FIN | CIV | ITA | GBR | USA | - | 0 | 10th | 10 |
| 1986 | Citroën Competition | Citroën BX 4TC | (France) Maurice Chomat | MON | SWE | POR | KEN | FRA | GRE; Ret | NZL | ARG | FIN | CIV | ITA | GBR | USA | - | 0 | 10th | 10 |

=== WRC era ===
| Year | Entrant | Car | No | Driver | 1 | 2 | 3 | 4 | 5 | 6 | 7 | 8 | 9 | 10 | 11 | 12 | 13 | 14 | 15 | 16 | WDC | Points | WMC | Points |
|---|---|---|---|---|---|---|---|---|---|---|---|---|---|---|---|---|---|---|---|---|---|---|---|---|
| 2001 | Automobiles Citroën | Citroën Xsara WRC | 14 | (France) Philippe Bugalski | MON | SWE | POR | ESP; 8 | ARG | CYP | GRC; 6 | KEN | FIN | NZL | ITA; Ret | FRA; Ret | AUS | GBR | | | 22nd | 1 | – | – |
| 2001 | Automobiles Citroën | Citroën Xsara WRC | 15 | (Spain) Jesús Puras | MON | SWE | POR | ESP; Ret | ARG | CYP | | | | | ITA; Ret | FRA; 1 | AUS | GBR | | | 11th | 10 | – | – |
| 2001 | Automobiles Citroën | Citroën Xsara WRC | 15 | (Sweden) Thomas Rådström | | | | | | | GRC; Ret | KEN | FIN | NZL | | | | | | | 15th | 6 | – | – |
| 2001 | Automobiles Citroën | Citroën Xsara WRC | 20 | (France) Sébastien Loeb | MON | SWE | POR | ESP | ARG | CYP | GRC | KEN | FIN | NZL | ITA; 2 | FRA | AUS | GBR | | | 14th | 6 | – | – |
| 2002 | Automobiles Citroën | Citroën Xsara WRC | 20 | (Sweden) Thomas Rådström | MON; Ret | SWE; 37 | FRA | ESP; Ret | CYP | ARG | GRE; 8 | KEN; 3 | FIN; Ret | | | NZL | AUS | GBR; Ret | | | 12th | 4 | – | – |
| 2002 | Automobiles Citroën | Citroën Xsara WRC | 20 | (Spain) Jesús Puras | | | | | | | | | | GER; Ret | ITA; 6 | | | | | | 19th | 1 | – | – |
| 2002 | Automobiles Citroën | Citroën Xsara WRC | 21 | (France) Sébastien Loeb | MON; 2 | SWE; 17 | FRA | ESP; Ret | CYP | ARG | GRE; 7 | KEN; 5 | FIN; 10 | GER; 1 | ITA | NZL | AUS; 7 | GBR; Ret | | | 10th | 18 | – | – |
| 2002 | Automobiles Citroën | Citroën Xsara WRC | 22 | (France) Philippe Bugalski | MON; Ret | SWE | FRA; 4 | ESP; 3 | CYP | ARG | GRE | KEN | FIN | GER; Ret | ITA; Ret | NZL | AUS | GBR | | | 11th | 7 | – | – |
| 2002 | Automobiles Citroën | Citroën Xsara WRC | 25 | (Spain) Jesús Puras | MON | SWE | FRA | ESP; 12 | CYP | ARG | GRE | KEN | FIN | | | NZL | AUS | GBR | | | 19th | 1 | – | – |
| 2003 | Citroën Total WRT | Citroën Xsara WRC | 17 | (United Kingdom) Colin McRae | MON; 2 | SWE; 5 | TUR; 4 | NZL; Ret | ARG; Ret | GRC; 8 | CYP; 4 | GER; 4 | FIN; Ret | AUS; 4 | ITA; 6 | FRA; 5 | ESP; 9 | GBR; 4 | | | 7th | 45 | 1st | 160 |
| 2003 | Citroën Total WRT | Citroën Xsara WRC | 18 | (France) Sébastien Loeb | MON; 1 | SWE; 7 | TUR; Ret | NZL; 4 | ARG; Ret | GRE; Ret | CYP; 3 | GER; 1 | FIN; 5 | AUS; 2 | ITA; 1 | FRA; 13 | ESP; 2 | GBR; 2 | | | 2nd | 71 | 1st | 160 |
| 2003 | Citroën Total WRT | Citroën Xsara WRC | 19 | (Spain) Carlos Sainz | MON; 3 | SWE; 9 | TUR; 1 | NZL; 12 | ARG; 2 | GRC; 2 | CYP; 5 | GER; 6 | FIN; 4 | AUS; 5 | ITA; 4 | FRA; 2 | ESP; 7 | GBR; Ret | | | 3rd | 63 | 1st | 160 |
| 2003 | Citroën Total WRT | Citroën Xsara WRC | 20 | (France) Philippe Bugalski | MON | SWE | TUR | NZL | ARG | GRC | CYP | GER; Ret | FIN | AUS | ITA; 8 | FRA; 9 | ESP; 10 | GBR | | | 23rd | 1 | 1st | 160 |
| 2004 | Citroën Total WRT | Citroën Xsara WRC | 3 | (France) Sébastien Loeb | MON; 1 | SWE; 1 | MEX; Ret | NZL; 4 | CYP; 1 | GRE; 2 | TUR; 1 | ARG; 2 | FIN; 4 | GER; 1 | JPN; 2 | GBR; 2 | ITA; 2 | FRA; 2 | ESP; Ret | AUS; 1 | 1st | 118 | 1st | 194 |
| 2004 | Citroën Total WRT | Citroën Xsara WRC | 4 | (Spain) Carlos Sainz | MON; Ret | SWE; 5 | MEX; 3 | NZL; 6 | CYP; 3 | GRC; 19 | TUR; 4 | ARG; 1 | FIN; 3 | GER; 3 | JPN; 5 | GBR; 4 | ITA; 3 | FRA; 3 | ESP; 3 | AUS; DNS | 4th | 73 | 1st | 194 |
| 2005 | Citroën Total WRT | Citroën Xsara WRC | 1 | (France) Sébastien Loeb | MON; 1 | SWE; Ret | MEX; 4 | NZL; 1 | ITA; 1 | CYP; 1 | TUR; 1 | GRE; 1 | ARG; 1 | FIN; 2 | GER; 1 | GBR; 3 | JPN; 2 | FRA; 1 | ESP; 1 | AUS; Ret | 1st | 127 | 1st | 188 |
| 2005 | Citroën Total WRT | Citroën Xsara WRC | 2 | (Belgium) François Duval | MON; Ret | SWE; 12 | MEX; Ret | NZL; 4 | ITA; 11 | CYP; Ret | | | ARG; 7 | FIN; 8 | GER; 2 | GBR; 2 | JPN; 4 | FRA; Ret | ESP; 2 | AUS; 1 | 6th | 47 | 1st | 188 |
| 2005 | Citroën Total WRT | Citroën Xsara WRC | 2 | (Spain) Carlos Sainz | | | | | | | TUR; 4 | GRC; 3 | | | | | | | | | 13th | 11 | 1st | 188 |
| 2006 | Kronos Total Citroën World Rally Team (Note: Kronos Racing were the entrant, supported by Citroën) | Citroën Xsara WRC | 1 | (France) Sébastien Loeb | MON; 2 | SWE; 2 | MEX; 1 | ESP; 1 | FRA; 1 | ARG; 1 | ITA; 1 | GRE; 2 | DEU; 1 | FIN; 2 | JPN; 1 | CYP; 1 | | | | | 1st | 112 | 2nd | 166 |
| 2006 | Kronos Total Citroën World Rally Team | Citroën Xsara WRC | 1 | (Scotland) Colin McRae | | | | | | | | | | | | | TUR; Ret | | | | - | 0 | 2nd | 166 |
| 2006 | Kronos Total Citroën World Rally Team | Citroën Xsara WRC | 1 | (Spain) Xavier Pons | | | | | | | | | | | | | | AUS; 4 | NZL; 4 | GBR; 5 | 7th | 32 | 2nd | 166 |
| 2006 | Kronos Total Citroën World Rally Team | Citroën Xsara WRC | 2 | (Spain) Xavier Pons | MON; 9 | SWE; 7 | MEX; Ret | ESP; Ret | FRA; 6 | ARG; 17 | ITA; 4 | GRE; 8 | | | | | | | | | 7th | 32 | 2nd | 166 |
| 2006 | Kronos Total Citroën World Rally Team | Citroën Xsara WRC | 2 | (Spain) Dani Sordo | | | | | | | | | DEU; 2 | FIN; Ret | JPN; DSQ | CYP; Ret | TUR; 7 | AUS; 23 | NZL; 5 | GBR; 7 | 5th | 49 | 2nd | 166 |
| 2006 | Kronos Total Citroën World Rally Team | Citroën Xsara WRC | 14 | (Spain) Dani Sordo | MON; 8 | SWE; 16 | MEX; 4 | ESP; 2 | FRA; 3 | ARG; 5 | ITA; 3 | GRE; 6 | | | | | | | | | 5th | 49 | 2nd | 166 |
| 2006 | Kronos Total Citroën World Rally Team | Citroën Xsara WRC | 14 | (Spain) Xavier Pons | | | | | | | | | DEU; 14 | FIN; Ret | JPN; DNS | CYP; 7 | TUR; 4 | | | | 7th | 32 | 2nd | 166 |
| 2007 | Citroën Total WRT | Citroën C4 WRC | 1 | (France) Sébastien Loeb | MON; 1 | SWE; 2 | NOR; 14 | MEX; 1 | POR; 1 | ARG; 1 | ITA; Ret | GRE; 2 | FIN; 3 | GER; 1 | NZL; 2 | ESP; 1 | FRA; 1 | JPN; Ret | IRE; 1 | GBR; 3 | 1st | 116 | 2nd | 183 |
| 2007 | Citroën Total WRT | Citroën C4 WRC | 2 | (Spain) Daniel Sordo | MON; 2 | SWE; 12 | NOR; 25 | MEX; 4 | POR; 3 | ARG; 6 | ITA; 3 | GRE; 24 | FIN; Ret | GER; Ret | NZL; 6 | ESP; 2 | FRA; 3 | JPN; 2 | IRE; 2 | GBR; 5 | 4th | 65 | 2nd | 183 |
| 2008 | Citroën Total WRT | Citroën C4 WRC | 1 | (France) Sébastien Loeb | MON; 1 | SWE; Ret | MEX; 1 | ARG; 1 | JOR; 10 | ITA; 1 | GRE; 1 | TUR; 3 | FIN; 1 | GER; 1 | NZL; 1 | ESP; 1 | FRA; 1 | JPN; 3 | GBR; 1 | | 1st | 122 | 1st | 191 |
| 2008 | Citroën Total WRT | Citroën C4 WRC | 2 | (Spain) Daniel Sordo | MON; 11 | SWE; 6 | MEX; 16 | ARG; 3 | JOR; 2 | ITA; 5 | GRE; 5 | TUR; 4 | FIN; 4 | GER; 2 | NZL; 2 | ESP; 2 | FRA; Ret | JPN; DSQ | GBR; 3 | | 3rd | 65 | 1st | 191 |
| 2009 | Citroën Total WRT | Citroën C4 WRC | 1 | (France) Sébastien Loeb | IRE; 1 | NOR; 1 | CYP; 1 | POR; 1 | ARG; 1 | ITA; 4 | GRE; Ret | POL; 7 | FIN; 2 | AUS; 2 | ESP; 1 | GBR; 1 | | | | | 1st | 93 | 1st | 167 |
| 2009 | Citroën Total WRT | Citroën C4 WRC | 2 | (Spain) Daniel Sordo | IRE; 2 | NOR; 5 | CYP; 4 | POR; 3 | ARG; 2 | ITA; 22 | GRE; 11 | POL; 2 | FIN; 4 | AUS; 3 | ESP; 2 | GBR; 3 | | | | | 3rd | 64 | 1st | 167 |
| 2010 | Citroën Total WRT | Citroën C4 WRC | 1 | (France) Sébastien Loeb | SWE; 2 | MEX; 1 | JOR; 1 | TUR; 1 | NZL; 3 | POR; 2 | BUL; 1 | FIN; 3 | GER; 1 | JPN; 5 | FRA; 1 | ESP; 1 | GBR; 1 | | | | 1st | 276 | 1st | 456 |
| 2010 | Citroën Total WRT | Citroën C4 WRC | 2 | (Spain) Daniel Sordo | SWE; 4 | MEX; 14 | JOR; 4 | TUR; Ret | NZL; 5 | POR; 3 | BUL; 2 | | GER; 2 | | FRA; 2 | ESP; 3 | | | | | 5th | 150 | 1st | 456 |
| 2010 | Citroën Total WRT | Citroën C4 WRC | 2 | (France) Sébastien Ogier | | | | | | | | FIN; 2 | | JPN; 1 | | | GBR; Ret | | | | 4th | 167 | 1st | 456 |
| 2011 | Citroën Total WRT | Citroën DS3 WRC | 1 | (France) Sébastien Loeb | SWE; 6 | MEX; 1 | POR; 2 | JOR; 3 | ITA; 1 | ARG; 1 | GRE; 2 | FIN; 1 | GER; 2 | AUS; 10 | FRA; Ret | ESP; 1 | GBR; Ret | | | | 1st | 222 | 1st | 403 |
| 2011 | Citroën Total WRT | Citroën DS3 WRC | 2 | (France) Sébastien Ogier | SWE; 4 | MEX; Ret | POR; 1 | JOR; 1 | ITA; 4 | ARG; 3 | GRE; 1 | FIN; 3 | GER; 1 | AUS; 11 | FRA; 1 | ESP; Ret | GBR; 11 | | | | 3rd | 196 | 1st | 403 |
| 2012 | Citroën Total WRT | Citroën DS3 WRC | 1 | (France) Sébastien Loeb | MON; 1 | SWE; 6 | MEX; 1 | POR; Ret | ARG; 1 | GRE; 1 | NZL; 1 | FIN; 1 | GER; 1 | GBR; 2 | FRA; 1 | ITA; Ret | ESP; 1 | | | | 1st | 270 | 1st | 453 |
| 2012 | Citroën Total WRT | Citroën DS3 WRC | 2 | (Finland) Mikko Hirvonen | MON; 4 | SWE; 2 | MEX; 2 | POR; DSQ | ARG; 2 | GRE; 2 | NZL; 2 | FIN; 2 | GER; 3 | GBR; 5 | FRA; 3 | ITA; 1 | ESP; 3 | | | | 2nd | 213 | 1st | 453 |
| 2013 | Citroën Total Abu Dhabi WRT | Citroën DS3 WRC | 1 | (France) Sébastien Loeb | MON; 1 | SWE; 2 | MEX | POR | ARG; 1 | GRE | ITA | FIN | GER | AUS | FRA; Ret | ESP | GBR | | | | 8th | 68 | 2nd | 280 |
| 2013 | Citroën Total Abu Dhabi WRT | Citroën DS3 WRC | 2 | (Finland) Mikko Hirvonen | MON; 4 | SWE; 17 | MEX; 2 | POR; 2 | ARG; 6 | GRE; 8 | ITA; Ret | FIN; 4 | GER; 3 | AUS; 3 | FRA; 6 | ESP; 3 | GBR; Ret | | | | 4th | 126 | 2nd | 280 |
| 2013 | Citroën Total Abu Dhabi WRT | Citroën DS3 WRC | 3 | (Spain) Daniel Sordo | MON | SWE | MEX; 4 | POR; 12 | ARG | GRE; 2 | ITA; 4 | FIN; 5 | GER; 1 | | | ESP; Ret | GBR; 7 | | | | 5th | 123 | 2nd | 280 |
| 2013 | Citroën Total Abu Dhabi WRT | Citroën DS3 WRC | 3 | (United Kingdom) Kris Meeke | | | | | | | | | | AUS; Ret | FRA | | | | | | – | 0 | 2nd | 280 |
| 2013 | Abu Dhabi Citroën Total World Rally Team | Citroën DS3 WRC | 10 | (Spain) Daniel Sordo | MON; 3 | | | | ARG; 9 | | | | | | FRA; 2 | | | | | | 5th | 123 | 6th | 63 |
| 2013 | Abu Dhabi Citroën Total World Rally Team | Citroën DS3 WRC | 10 | (United Arab Emirates) Khalid Al Qassimi | | SWE; Ret | | POR; 9 | | GRE; Ret | ITA; 10 | | GER; 11 | AUS; 9 | | ESP; 11 | | | | | 21st | 5 | 6th | 63 |
| 2013 | Abu Dhabi Citroën Total World Rally Team | Citroën DS3 WRC | 10 | (Australia) Chris Atkinson | | | MEX; 6 | | | | | | | | | | | | | | 16th | 8 | 6th | 63 |
| 2013 | Abu Dhabi Citroën Total World Rally Team | Citroën DS3 WRC | 10 | (United Kingdom) Kris Meeke | | | | | | | | FIN; Ret | | | | | | | | | – | 0 | 6th | 63 |
| 2013 | Abu Dhabi Citroën Total World Rally Team | Citroën DS3 WRC | 10 | (Poland) Robert Kubica | | | | | | | | | | | | | GBR; Ret | | | | 13th | 18 | 6th | 63 |
| 2013 | Abu Dhabi Citroën Total World Rally Team | Citroën DS3 WRC | 14 | (Spain) Daniel Sordo | | SWE; Ret | | | | | | | | | | | | | | | 5th | 123 | 6th | 63 |
| 2014 | Citroën Total Abu Dhabi World Rally Team | Citroën DS3 WRC | 3 | (United Kingdom) Kris Meeke | MON; 3 | SWE; 10 | MEX; Ret | POR; Ret | ARG; 3 | ITA; 18 | POL; 7 | FIN; 3 | GER; Ret | AUS; 4 | FRA; 3 | ESP; 19 | GBR; 6 | | | | 7th | 92 | 2nd | 210 |
| 2014 | Citroën Total Abu Dhabi World Rally Team | Citroën DS3 WRC | 4 | (Norway) Mads Østberg | MON; 4 | SWE; 3 | MEX; 9 | POR; 3 | ARG; Ret | ITA; 2 | POL; Ret | FIN; Ret | GER; 6 | AUS; 16 | FRA; 7 | ESP; 4 | GBR; 3 | | | | 5th | 108 | 2nd | 210 |
| 2014 | Citroën Total Abu Dhabi World Rally Team | Citroën DS3 WRC | 12 | (United Arab Emirates) Khalid Al Qassimi | MON | SWE; 16 | MEX | POR; 13 | ARG | ITA; 10 | POL | FIN | GER | AUS | FRA | ESP; 15 | GBR | | | | 29th | 1 | 2nd | 210 |
| 2015 | Citroën Total Abu Dhabi World Rally Team | Citroën DS3 WRC | 3 | (United Kingdom) Kris Meeke | MON; 10 | SWE; 7 | MEX; 16 | ARG; 1 | POR; 4 | ITA; 24 | POL; 7 | FIN; 17 | GER; 12 | AUS; 3 | FRA; 4 | ESP; 5 | GBR; 2 | | | | 5th | 112 | 2nd | 230 |
| 2015 | Citroën Total Abu Dhabi World Rally Team | Citroën DS3 WRC | 4 | (France) Sébastien Loeb | MON; 8 | | | | | | | | | | | | | | | | 18th | 6 | 2nd | 230 |
| 2015 | Citroën Total Abu Dhabi World Rally Team | Citroën DS3 WRC | 4 | (Norway) Mads Østberg | | SWE; 10 | MEX; 2 | ARG; 2 | POR; 7 | ITA; 5 | POL; 9 | FIN; 3 | GER; 7 | | FRA; 6 | ESP; 4 | GBR; 7 | | | | 4th | 116 | 2nd | 230 |
| 2015 | Citroën Total Abu Dhabi World Rally Team | Citroën DS3 WRC | 4 | (France) Stéphane Lefebvre | | | | | | | | | | AUS; 13 | | | | | | | 19th | 5 | 2nd | 230 |
| 2015 | Citroën Total Abu Dhabi World Rally Team | Citroën DS3 WRC | 12 | (Norway) Mads Østberg | MON; 4 | | | | | | | | | | | | | | | | 4th | 112 | – | – |
| 2015 | Citroën Total Abu Dhabi World Rally Team | Citroën DS3 WRC | 12 | (United Arab Emirates) Khalid Al Qassimi | | SWE | MEX | ARG; 6 | POR; 24 | ITA; 10 | POL | FIN; 16 | | | | ESP; 15 | | | | | 13th | 9 | – | – |
| 2015 | Citroën Total Abu Dhabi World Rally Team | Citroën DS3 WRC | 12 | (France) Stéphane Lefebvre | | | | | | | | | GER; 10 | AUS | FRA; 11 | | GBR; 8 | | | | 19th | 5 | – | – |
| 2016 | Abu Dhabi Total World Rally Team (Note: PH Sport ran the Abu Dhabi Total World Rally Team by request of Citroën Racing. As a non-manufacturer entry the team was not eligible for the Manufacturer's championship.) | Citroën DS3 WRC | 7 | (United Kingdom) Kris Meeke | MON; Ret | SWE; 23 | MEX | ARG | POR; 1 | ITA | | FIN; 1 | GER | CHN; C | FRA; 16 | ESP; Ret | GBR; 5 | AUS | | | 9th | 64 | - | - |
| 2016 | Abu Dhabi Total World Rally Team | Citroën DS3 WRC | 7 | (France) Stéphane Lefebvre | | | | | | | POL; 9 | | | | | | | | | | 13th | 14 | - | - |
| 2016 | Abu Dhabi Total World Rally Team | Citroën DS3 WRC | 8 | (France) Stéphane Lefebvre | MON; 5 | SWE | MEX | ARG | POR; 35 | ITA | | | | | | | | AUS | | | 13th | 14 | - | - |
| 2016 | Abu Dhabi Total World Rally Team | Citroën DS3 WRC | 8 | (Republic of Ireland) Craig Breen | | | | | | | POL; 7 | FIN; 3 | GER | CHN; C | FRA; 10 | ESP; Ret | GBR; Ret | | | | 10th | 36 | - | - |
| 2016 | Abu Dhabi Total World Rally Team | Citroën DS3 WRC | 14 | (United Arab Emirates) Khalid Al-Qassimi | MON | SWE; 19 | MEX | ARG | POR; 26 | ITA | POL | FIN; 16 | GER | CHN; C | FRA | ESP; 12 | | AUS | | | NC | 0 | - | - |
| 2016 | Abu Dhabi Total World Rally Team | Citroën DS3 WRC | 14 | (France) Stéphane Lefebvre | | | | | | | | | | | | | GBR; 9 | | | | 13th | 14 | - | - |
| 2016 | Abu Dhabi Total World Rally Team | Citroën DS3 WRC | 15 | (Republic of Ireland) Craig Breen | MON | SWE; 8 | MEX | ARG | POR | ITA | | | | | | | GBR | AUS | | | 10th | 36 | - | - |
| 2016 | Abu Dhabi Total World Rally Team | Citroën DS3 WRC | 16 | (France) Quentin Gilbert | MON | SWE | MEX | ARG | POR | ITA | POL | FIN | GER | CHN; C | FRA | ESP | GBR; 17 | AUS | | | NC | 0 | - | - |
| 2017 | Citroën Total Abu Dhabi WRT | Citroën C3 WRC | 7 | (United Kingdom) Kris Meeke | MON; Ret | SWE; 12 | MEX; 1 | FRA; Ret | ARG; Ret | POR; 18 | ITA; Ret | | FIN; 8 | GER; Ret | ESP; 1 | | | | | | 7th | 77 | 4th | 218 |
| 2017 | Citroën Total Abu Dhabi WRT | Citroën C3 WRC | 7 | (Norway) Andreas Mikkelsen | | | | | | | | POL; 9 | | | | | | | | | 12th | 54 | 4th | 218 |
| 2017 | Citroën Total Abu Dhabi WRT | Citroën C3 WRC | 7 | (United Arab Emirates) Khalid Al Qassimi | | | | | | | | | | | | GBR; 22 | | | | | – | 0 | 4th | 218 |
| 2017 | Citroën Total Abu Dhabi WRT | Citroën C3 WRC | 7 | (France) Stéphane Lefebvre | | | | | | | | | | | | | AUS; Ret | | | | 13th | 30 | 4th | 218 |
| 2017 | Citroën Total Abu Dhabi WRT | Citroën C3 WRC | 8 | (France) Stéphane Lefebvre | MON; 9 | | MEX; 15 | | | | | | | | ESP; 6 | | | | | | 13th | 30 | 4th | 218 |
| 2017 | Citroën Total Abu Dhabi WRT | Citroën C3 WRC | 8 | (Republic of Ireland) Craig Breen | | SWE; 5 | | FRA; 5 | ARG; Ret | POR; 5 | ITA; 25 | POL; 11 | | GER; 5 | | GBR; 15 | AUS; Ret | | | | 10th | 64 | 4th | 218 |
| 2017 | Citroën Total Abu Dhabi WRT | Citroën C3 WRC | 8 | (United Arab Emirates) Khalid Al Qassimi | | | | | | | | | FIN; 16 | | | | | | | | – | 0 | 4th | 218 |
| 2017 | Citroën Total Abu Dhabi WRT | Citroën C3 WRC | 9 | (France) Stéphane Lefebvre | MON | SWE | MEX | FRA; 50 | ARG | POR; 13 | | POL; 5 | | | | | | | | | 13th | 30 | 4th | 218 |
| 2017 | Citroën Total Abu Dhabi WRT | Citroën C3 WRC | 9 | (Norway) Andreas Mikkelsen | | | | | | | ITA; 8 | | | GER; 2 | | | | | | | 12th | 54 | 4th | 218 |
| 2017 | Citroën Total Abu Dhabi WRT | Citroën C3 WRC | 9 | (Republic of Ireland) Craig Breen | | | | | | | | | FIN; 5 | | | | | | | | 10th | 64 | 4th | 218 |
| 2017 | Citroën Total Abu Dhabi WRT | Citroën C3 WRC | 9 | (United Arab Emirates) Khalid Al Qassimi | | | | | | | | | | | ESP; 17 | | | | | | – | 0 | 4th | 218 |
| 2017 | Citroën Total Abu Dhabi WRT | Citroën C3 WRC | 9 | (United Kingdom) Kris Meeke | | | | | | | | | | | | GBR; 7 | AUS; 7 | | | | 7th | 77 | 4th | 218 |
| 2017 | Citroën Total Abu Dhabi WRT | Citroën C3 WRC | 15 | (United Arab Emirates) Khalid Al Qassimi | MON | SWE | MEX | FRA | ARG | POR; 17 | ITA | POL | FIN | GER | ESP | GBR | AUS | | | | – | 0 | – | – |
| 2017 | Citroën Total Abu Dhabi WRT | Citroën DS3 WRC | 14 | (Republic of Ireland) Craig Breen | MON; 5 | SWE | MEX | FRA | ARG | POR | ITA | POL | FIN | GER | ESP | GBR | AUS | | | | 10th | 64 | – | – |
| 2017 | Citroën Total Abu Dhabi WRT | Citroën DS3 WRC | 15 | (France) Stéphane Lefebvre | MON | SWE; 8 | MEX | FRA | ARG | POR | ITA | POL | FIN | GER | ESP | GBR | AUS | | | | 13th | 30 | – | – |
| 2018 | Citroën Total Abu Dhabi WRT | Citroën C3 WRC | 10 | (United Kingdom) Kris Meeke | MON; 4 | SWE; Ret | MEX; 3 | FRA; 9 | ARG; 7 | POR; Ret | ITA; WD | | | | | | | | | | 14th | 43 | 4th | 237 |
| 2018 | Citroën Total Abu Dhabi WRT | Citroën C3 WRC | 10 | (Norway) Mads Østberg | | | | | | | | FIN; 2 | GER; Ret | TUR; 23 | GBR; 8 | | AUS; 3 | | | | 10th | 70 | 4th | 237 |
| 2018 | Citroën Total Abu Dhabi WRT | Citroën C3 WRC | 10 | (France) Sébastien Loeb | | | | | | | | | | | | ESP; 1 | | | | | 13th | 43 | 4th | 237 |
| 2018 | Citroën Total Abu Dhabi WRT | Citroën C3 WRC | 11 | (Republic of Ireland) Craig Breen | MON; 9 | SWE; 2 | | | ARG; Ret | POR; 7 | ITA; 6 | FIN; 8 | GER; 7 | TUR; Ret | GBR; 4 | ESP; 9 | AUS; 7 | | | | 11th | 67 | 4th | 237 |
| 2018 | Citroën Total Abu Dhabi WRT | Citroën C3 WRC | 11 | (France) Sébastien Loeb | | | MEX; 5 | FRA; 14 | | | | | | | | | | | | | 13th | 43 | 4th | 237 |
| 2018 | Citroën Total Abu Dhabi WRT | Citroën C3 WRC | 12 | (Norway) Mads Østberg | MON | SWE; 6 | MEX | FRA | | POR; 6 | ITA; 5 | | | | | | | | | | 10th | 70 | 4th | 237 |
| 2018 | Citroën Total Abu Dhabi WRT | Citroën C3 WRC | 12 | (United Arab Emirates) Khalid Al Qassimi | | | | | ARG; 14 | | | FIN; 37 | GER | TUR; 15 | GBR | ESP; 21 | AUS | | | | NC | 0 | 4th | 237 |
| 2019 | Citroën Total WRT | Citroën C3 WRC | 1 | (France) Sébastien Ogier | MON; 1 | SWE; 29 | MEX; 1 | FRA; 2 | ARG; 3 | CHL; 2 | POR; 3 | ITA; 41 | FIN; 5 | GER; 7 | TUR; 1 | GBR; 3 | ESP; 8 | AUS; C | | | 3rd | 217 | 3rd | 284 |
| 2019 | Citroën Total WRT | Citroën C3 WRC | 4 | (Finland) Esapekka Lappi | MON; Ret | SWE; 2 | MEX; 13 | FRA; 7 | ARG; Ret | CHL; 6 | POR; Ret | ITA; 7 | FIN; 2 | GER; 8 | TUR; 2 | GBR; 27 | ESP; Ret | AUS; C | | | 10th | 83 | 3rd | 284 |

== J-WRC results ==
| Year | Entrant | Car | No | Driver | 1 | 2 | 3 | 4 | 5 | 6 | 7 | 8 | 9 | JWRC | Points |
|---|---|---|---|---|---|---|---|---|---|---|---|---|---|---|---|
| 2001 | Citroën Sport | Citroën Saxo Kit Car | 53 | (France) Sébastien Loeb | ESP; 1 | GRE; 1 | | | | | | | | 1st | 50 |
| 2001 | Citroën Sport | Citroën Saxo VTS S1600 | 53 | (France) Sébastien Loeb | | | FIN; 1 | ITA | FRA; 1 | GBR; 1 | | | | 1st | 50 |
| 2001 | Citroën Sport | Citroën Saxo VTS S1600 | 55 | (United Kingdom) Niall McShea | ESP | GRE | FIN; Ret | ITA; 4 | FRA; 4 | GBR; 2 | | | | 3rd | 12 |
| 2002 | Citroën Sport | Citroën Saxo S1600 | 56 | (Finland) Jussi Välimäki | MON; Ret | ESP; Ret | GRE; Ret | GER; Ret | ITA; 9 | GBR; 5 | | | | 15th | 2 |
| 2002 | Citroën Sport | Citroën Saxo S1600 | 62 | (Finland) Janne Tuohino | MON; Ret | ESP; 5 | GRE; 1 | GER; Ret | ITA; 10 | GBR; 4 | | | | 3rd | 15 |
| 2002 | Citroën Sport | Citroën Saxo S1600 | 65 | (Spain) Dani Solà | MON; Ret | ESP; 1 | GRE; 4 | GER; 1 | ITA; 3 | GBR; 1 | | | | 1st | 37 |
| 2002 | Citroën Sport | Citroën Saxo S1600 | 70 | (Germany) Sven Haaf | MON; Ret | ESP; 13 | GRE | GER; Ret | ITA | GBR | | | | – | 0 |
| 2003 | Citroën Sport | Citroën Saxo S1600 | 66 | (France) Sébastien Ceccone | MON; Ret | TUR; Ret | GRE | FIN | ITA | ESP | GBR | | | – | 0 |
| 2004 | Citroën Total | Citroën Saxo S1600 | 40 | (France) Guerlain Chicherit | MON; Ret | GRE; Ret | TUR; 4 | FIN; Ret | GBR; Ret | ITA; Ret | ESP; Ret | | | 12th | 5 |
| 2005 | Kronos Racing | Citroën C2 S1600 | 35 | (United Kingdom) Kris Meeke | MON; 1 | MEX | ITA; 3 | GRE; 6 | FIN; 7 | GER; 2 | FRA; 8 | ESP; 7 | | 3rd | 32 |
| 2005 | Kronos Racing | Citroën C2 S1600 | 41 | (Spain) Dani Sordo | MON; 4 | MEX | ITA; 1 | GRE; Ret | FIN; 1 | GER; 1 | FRA; 2 | ESP; 1 | | 1st | 53 |
| 2006 | PH Sport | Citroën C2 S1600 | 32 | (United Kingdom) Kris Meeke | SWE | ESP; 3 | FRA; Ret | ARG | ITA | GER; 1 | FIN; Ret | TUR; 5 | GBR; Ret | 7th | 20 |
| 2006 | PH Sport | Citroën C2 S1600 | 42 | (France) Julien Pressac | SWE | ESP; Ret | FRA; 4 | ARG | ITA; 7 | GER; 4 | FIN; 4 | TUR; 7 | GBR | 8th | 19 |
| 2006 | PH Sport | Citroën C2 S1600 | 55 | (France) Brice Tirabassi | SWE | ESP; 9 | FRA; 1 | ARG | ITA; Ret | GER; Ret | FIN | TUR | GBR | 14th | 11 |
| 2007 | PH Sport | Citroën C2 S1600 | 33 | (Zimbabwe) Conrad Rautenbach | NOR | POR; 10 | ITA; Ret | FIN; 4 | GER; 3 | ESP; 5 | FRA; 8 | | | 8th | 16 |
| 2008 | Equipe de France FFSA | Citroën C2 S1600 | 42 | (France) Sébastien Ogier | MEX; 1 | JOR; 1 | ITA; 5 | FIN | GER; 1 | ESP; Ret | FRA; 2 | | | 1st | 42 |
