= Barry Clark (rally driver) =

British rally driver (born 1982)

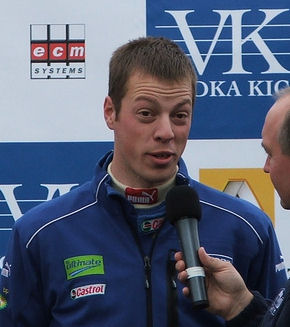

Personal information
- Nationality: (United Kingdom) British
- Born: 30 July 1982 (age 44)

World Rally Championship record
- Years active: 2003, 2006–2008
- Co-driver: (United Kingdom) Clive Jenkins (United Kingdom) Scott Martin (United Kingdom) Aled Davies (Republic of Ireland) Paul Nagle
- Teams: Munchi's Ford
- Rallies: 18
- Championships: 0
- Rally wins: 0
- Podiums: 0
- Stage wins: 0
- Total points: 0
- First rally: 2003 Wales Rally GB
- Last rally: 2008 Wales Rally GB

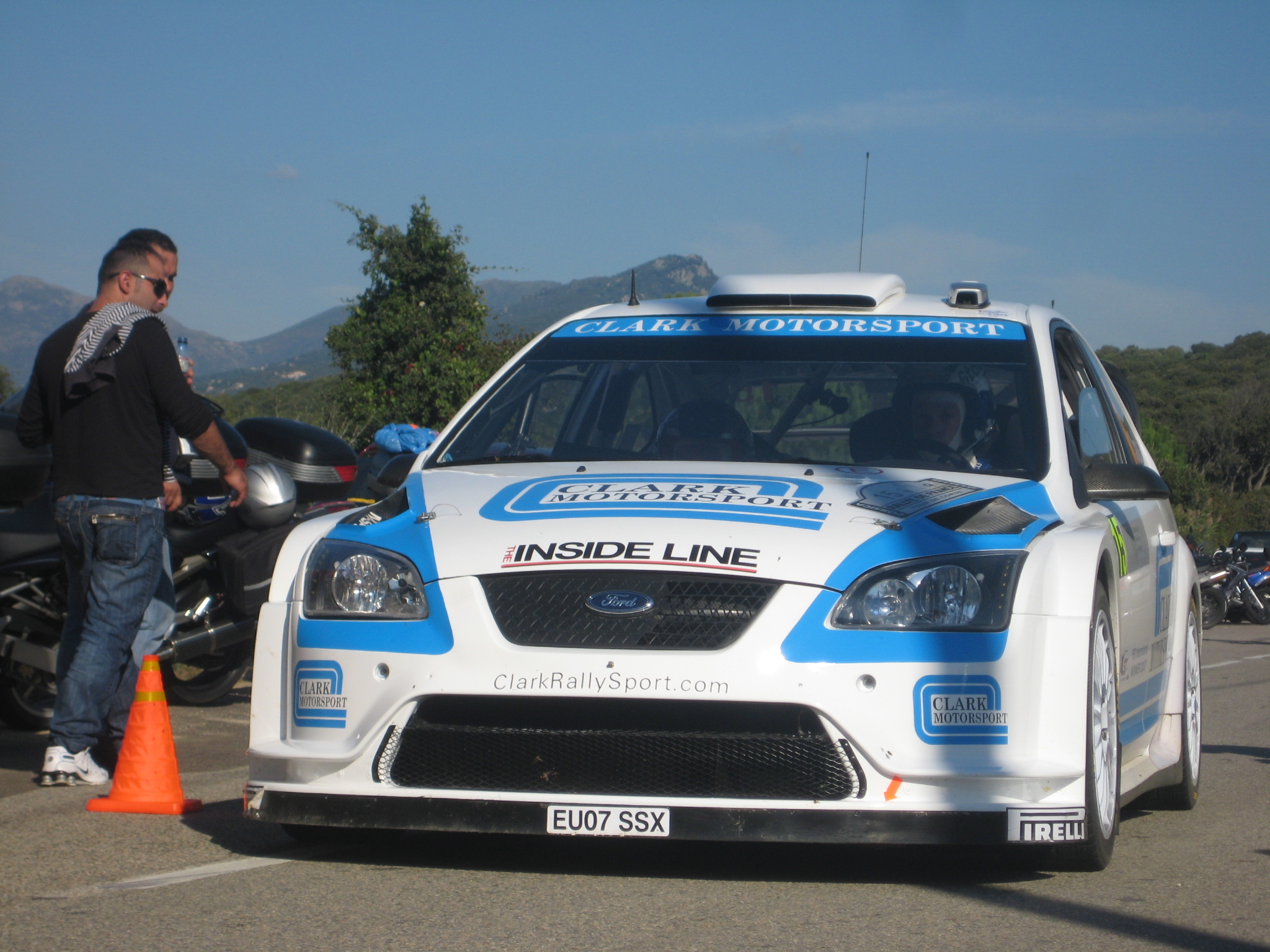
Barry Clark at the 2008 Rallye de France.

Barry Clark (born 30 July 1982) is a Scottish rally driver born in Aberdeen in Scotland. In 2006, he became the PWRC Junior Rookie World Champion competing in his Fiesta ST.

After becoming the Fiesta Sporting Trophy International champion in 2007, Clark was awarded a drive in the World Rally Championship for one event, and secured funding for two more events. His first event was to be in Turkey driving a Ford Focus WRC for the Munchi's Ford team, but after regular Munchi's driver Luís Pérez Companc had to drop out of the Jordan rally, Clark took his place at short notice. Clark also helps organise his local event, the Speyside Stages organised by 63 car club and the Grampian Forest stages organised by Stonehaven and District Motor Club.

Despite competing in four WRC events in 2008, Clark was unable to secure sponsorship to enable him to continue at that level and he more or less retired from the WRC. He built a successful rally car preparation business in Kintore, Aberdeenshire before it was sold on in 2012.

== Complete WRC results ==
Year	Entrant	Car	1	2	3	4	5	6	7	8	9	10	11	12	13	14	15	16	WDC	Points
2003	Barry Clark	Ford Puma S1600	MON	SWE	TUR	NZL	ARG	GRE	CYP	GER	FIN	AUS	ITA	FRA	ESP	GBR; Ret			-	0
2006	Barry Clark	Ford Fiesta ST	MON	SWE	MEX	ESP; Ret	FRA; 40	ARG; 49	ITA	GRE	GER; 35	FIN; 37	JPN	CYP	TUR	AUS	NZL	GBR; 30	-	0
2007	Barry Clark	Ford Fiesta ST	MON	SWE	NOR; 29	MEX	POR; 24	ARG	ITA; 32	GRE	FIN; 55	GER; 45	NZL	ESP; 59	FRA	JPN	IRE		-	0
2007	Barry Clark	Subaru Impreza STi																GBR; 22	-	0
2008	Munchi's Ford World Rally Team	Ford Focus RS WRC 07	MON	SWE	MEX	ARG	JOR; 12	ITA	GRE	TUR; 10	FIN	GER	NZL	ESP					-	0
2008	Stobart VK Ford Rally Team	Ford Focus RS WRC 07													FRA; 10		GBR; 10		-	0
