= 2006 Rally of Turkey =

Rallying motorsport event

Round 13 of 16 in the 2006 World Rally Championship
← Previous event	Next event →
- Host country: Turkey
- Rally base: Kemer
- Dates run: 13 – 15 October 2006
- Stages: 16 (337.79 km; 209.89 miles)
- Stage surface: Gravel
- Transport distance: 781.83 km (485.81 miles)
- Overall distance: 1,119.62 km (695.70 miles)

Statistics
- Crews registered: 67
- Crews: 63 at start, 51 at finish

Overall results
- Overall winner: (Finland) Marcus Gronholm (Finland) Timo Rautiainen (United Kingdom) BP Ford World Rally Team; 3:28:16.3

Support category results
- J-WRC winner: (Estonia) Urmo Aava (Estonia) Kuldar Sikk (Japan) Suzuki Sport Europe; 4:02:06.5

The 2006 Rally of Turkey was a motor racing event for rally cars that was held over three days between 13 and 15 October 2006. It marked the 7th running of the Rally of Turkey, and was the thirteenth round of the 2006 World Rally Championship season. The event was also the eighth round of the 2006 Junior WRC. The 2006 event was based in Kemer in Turkey and was contested over nineteen special stages, covering a total competitive distance of 337.79 km (209.89 miles).

Sebastien Loeb, along with Kronos Citroën World Rally Team were the defending rally winners, but Loeb would not enter the rally after breaking his arm in a mountain biking accident. Colin McRae would take Loeb's place, in what would end up being his last rally before his death the next year. He would retire on the final stage with mechanical issues.

Marcus Gronholm and Timo Rautiainen won the rally, their first rally win since the 2006 Rally Finland.

== Background ==
=== Entry list ===
The following crews were set to enter the rally. The event was open to crews competing in the World Rally Championship and its support category, the Junior WRC, as well as privateer entries that were not registered to score points in the manufacturer's championship. Fifteen were entered under World Rally Car regulations, as were seventeen in the Junior WRC category.

World Rally Car entries competing in the World Rally Championship
No.	Driver	Co-Driver	Entrant	Car	Tyre
1	(United Kingdom) Colin McRae	(United Kingdom) Nicky Grist	(Belgium) Kronos Citroën World Rally Team	Citroën Xsara WRC	BF
2	(Spain) Dani Sordo	(Spain) Marc Martí	(Belgium) Kronos Citroën World Rally Team	Citroën Xsara WRC	BF
3	(Finland) Marcus Gronholm	(Finland) Timo Rautiainen	(United Kingdom) BP Ford World Rally Team	Ford Focus RS WRC 06	BF
4	(Finland) Mikko Hirvonen	(Finland) Jarmo Lehtinen	(United Kingdom) BP Ford World Rally Team	Ford Focus RS WRC 06	BF
5	(Norway) Petter Solberg	(United Kingdom) Phil Mills	(Japan) Subaru World Rally Team	Impreza WRC 2006	P
6	(Australia) Chris Atkinson	(Australia) Glenn Macneall	(Japan) Subaru World Rally Team	Impreza WRC 2006	P
7	(Austria) Manfred Stohl	(Austria) Ilka Minor	OMV Peugeot Norway World Rally Team	Peugeot 307 WRC	BF
8	(Norway) Henning Solberg	(Norway) Cato Menkerud	OMV Peugeot Norway World Rally Team	Peugeot 307 WRC	BF
9	(United Kingdom) Matthew Wilson	(United Kingdom) Michael Orr	(United Kingdom) Stobart VK M-Sport Ford Rally Team	Ford Focus RS WRC 04	BF
10	(Finland) Kosti Katajamäki	(Finland) Timo Alanne	(United Kingdom) Stobart VK M-Sport Ford Rally Team	Ford Focus RS WRC 04	BF
11	(Finland) Harri Rovanperä	(Finland) Risto Pietiläinen	(Austria) Red Bull Škoda Team	Škoda Fabia WRC	BF
12	(Austria) Andreas Aigner	(Germany) Klaus Wicha	(Austria) Red Bull Škoda Team	Škoda Fabia WRC	BF

Super 1600 entries competing in the Junior WRC
No.	Driver	Co-Driver	Entrant	Car
32	(United Kingdom) Kris Meeke	(United Kingdom) Glenn Patterson	(France) PH Sport	Citroën C2 S1600
33	(Estonia) Urmo Aava	(Estonia) Kuldar Sikk	(Japan) Suzuki Sport Europe	Suzuki Swift 1600
35	(Sweden) Per-Gunnar Andersson	(Sweden) Jonas Andersson	(Japan) Suzuki Sport Europe	Suzuki Swift 1600
37	(Czech Republic) Pavel Valoušek	(Czech Republic) Zdeněk Hrůza	(Japan) Suzuki Sport Europe	Suzuki Swift 1600
39	(Zimbabwe) Conrad Rautenbach	(United Kingdom) David Senior	(France) Barroso Sport	Renault Clio 1600
41	(Sweden) Patrik Sandell	(Sweden) Emil Axelsson	(France) Renault Sport	Renault Clio 1600
42	(France) Juliern Pressac	(France) Jack Boyere	(France) PH Sport	Citroën C2 S1600
43	(Estonia) Jaan Mölder	(Germany) Katrin Becker	(Czech Republic) JM Engineering	Suzuki Ignis 1600
44	(Poland) Michał Kościuszko	(Czech Republic) Jaroslaw Baran	(Japan) Suzuki Sport Europe	Suzuki Swift 1600
45	(Slovakia) Jozef Béreš	(Czech Republic) Petr Starý	(Slovakia) Styllex Tuning Motorsport	Suzuki Ignis 1600
46	(Italy) Andrea Cortinovis	(Italy) Flavio Zanella	(Italy) Power Car Team	Renault Clio RS
48	(United Kingdom) Guy Wilks	(United Kingdom) Phil Pugh	(Japan) Suzuki Sport Europe	Suzuki Swift 1600
49	(Czech Republic) Martin Prokop	(Czech Republic) Jan Tománek	(Czech Republic) Jipocar Czech National Team	Citroën C2 S1600
51	(Turkey) Fatih Kara	(Turkey) Cerm Bakancocuklari	(France) Renault Sport	Renault Clio 1600
52	(Belgium) Bernd Casier	(Belgium) Frédéric Miclotte	(France) Renault Sport	Renault Clio 1600
54	(Germany) Aaron Burkart	(Germany) Tanja Geilhausen	(Austria) OMV Rally Team	Citroën C2 S1600
55	(France) Fabio Fiandino	(France) Sabrina de Castelli	(France) PH Sport	Citroën C2 R2

Other major entries
No.	Driver	Co-Driver	Entrant	Car
14	(Spain) Xavier Pons	(Spain) Carlos del Barrio	(Belgium) Kronos Racing	Citroën Xsara WRC
15	(Czech Republic) Jan Kopecký	(Czech Republic) Filip Schovánek	(Czech Republic) Czech RT Škoda Kopecký	Škoda Fabia WRC
16	(Belgium) François Duval	(France) Patrick Pivato	(Belgium) First Motorsport Škoda	Škoda Fabia WRC

=== Itinerary ===
All dates and times are EEST (UTC+3).

Date	No.	Time span	Stage name	Distance
12 October	—	After 0:00	Okić [Shakedown]	3.00 km
13 October	~~SS1~~	~~After 7:58~~	~~Perge 1~~	~~22.43 km~~
13 October	~~SS2~~	~~After 8:41~~	~~Myra 1~~	~~24.15 km~~
13 October	SS3	After 9:24	Kumluca 1	9.90 km
13 October		10:54	Service A, Kemer	—N/a
13 October	~~SS4~~	~~After 12:22~~	~~Perge 2~~	~~22.43 km~~
13 October	SS5	After 13:05	Myra 2	10.93 km
13 October	SS6	After 13:48	Kumluca 2	9.90 km
13 October		15:18	Service B, Kemer	—N/a
13 October	SS7	After 16:11	Tekirova 1	5.50 km
13 October	SS8	After 17:09	Phaselis 1	29.28 km
13 October	SS9	After 19:22	Akdeniz University 1	5.20 km
13 October		20:42	Service C, Kemer	—N/a
14 October		8:00	Service D, Kemer	—N/a
14 October	SS10	After 8:33	Kemer 1	20.50 km
14 October	SS11	After 9:21	Silyon 1	27.36 km
14 October		11:11	Service E, Kemer	—N/a
14 October	SS12	After 12:04	Kemer 2	20.50 km
14 October	SS13	After 12:52	Silyon 2	27.36 km
14 October		14:42	Service F, Kemer	—N/a
14 October	SS14	After 16:00	Chimera 1	16.91 km
14 October	SS15	After 16:58	Phaselis 2	16.58 km
14 October	SS16	After 19:11	Akdeniz University 2	5.20 km
14 October		20:31	Service G, Kemer	—N/a
15 October		9:15	Service H, Kemer	—N/a
15 October	SS17	After 9:48	Tekirova 2	5.50 km
15 October	SS18	After 10:31	Chimera 2	16.91 km
15 October	SS19	After 11:19	Olympos	28.55 km
15 October		12:42	Service I, Kemer	—N/a

== Report ==
=== Overall ===
==== Summary ====
Before the event began, the service park and stages were hit with a large storm that damaged some of the teams' service areas. The rain continued throughout the shakedown, where Solberg was fastest.

Friday saw more rain; stages 1, 2, and 4 were cancelled, and stage 5 was shortened, due to poor conditions. Many drivers commented on the slippery, muddy conditions. It was Gronholm with the fastest times in the first two legs, where conditions were the most treacherous. Rovanpera would lose a wheel on stage 3, while McRae was cautious due to his lack of experience in the car under such challenging conditions. Petter Solberg would win all 3 stages in the final leg of the day, but it was not enough to catch Gronholm, who lead at the end of the day.

Saturday saw dry conditions in the morning, but the roads remained difficult due to the rough nature of the stages. Gronholm, Hirvonen, and Solberg would trade stage wins throughout the day, until Solberg hit a rock and became stuck in a ditch on stage 14, forcing his retirement. The second leg of the day saw rain return, as well as spats of hail and snow. With Solberg out of contention, Gronholm's nearest competitor, his teammate Hirvonen, was over two minutes behind. Gronholm would lead at the end of the second day, despite calling the nature of the rally a "nightmare."

On the final day, Gronholm and Hirvonen would finish the rally with a Ford 1-2. Petter's brother Henning Solberg would round out the podium after surviving the terrible conditions of the previous few days. Petter would win two of the three Sunday stages, but it would not be enough to earn any points. Meanwhile, Atkinson, who had remained in a good position throughout the rally, would fall two places to 6th on the last day. McRae would approach the end of the day in 6th, only to retire due to electrical malfunctions on the last stage.

==== Classification ====
Position		No.	Driver	Co-driver	Entrant	Car	Time	Difference	Points
Event	Class	No.	Driver	Co-driver	Entrant	Car	Time	Difference	Points
1	1	3	(Finland) Marcus Grönholm	(Finland) Timo Rautiainen	BP Ford World Rally Team	Ford Focus RS WRC 06	3:28:16.3	0.0	10
2	2	4	(Finland) Mikko Hirvonen	(Finland) Jarmo Lehtinen	BP Ford World Rally Team	Ford Focus RS WRC 06	3:30:39.7	+2:23.4	8
3	3	8	(Norway) Henning Solberg	(Norway) Cato Menkerud	OMV Peugeot Norway World Rally Team	Peugeot 307 WRC	3:31:22.3	+3:06.0	6
4	4	14	(Spain) Xavier Pons	(Spain) Carlos Del Barrio	Kronos Racing	Citroën Xsara WRC	3:31:43.7	+3:27.4	5
5	5	10	(Finland) Kosti Katajamäki	(Finland) Timo Alanne	Stobart VK M-Sport Ford Rally Team	Ford Focus RS WRC 04	3:31:44.8	+3:28.5	4
6	6	6	(Australia) Chris Atkinson	(Australia) Glenn MacNeall	Subaru World Rally Team	Subaru Impreza WRC	3:31:52.8	+3:36.5	3
7	7	2	(Spain) Dani Sordo	(Spain) Marc Marti	Kronos Citroën World Rally Team	Citroën Xsara WRC	3:32:41.1	+4:24.8	2
8	8	7	(Austria) Manfred Stohl	(Austria) Ilka Minor	OMV Peugeot Norway World Rally Team	Peugeot 307 WRC	3:32:46.6	+4:30.3	1
9	9	16	(Belgium) François Duval	(France) Patrick Pivato	First Motorsport Škoda	Škoda Fabia WRC	3:33:51.9	+5:36.6	0
10	10	12	(Austria) Andreas Aigner	(Germany) Klaus Wicha	Red Bull Škoda Team	Škoda Fabia WRC	3:35:13.7	+6:57.4	0
11	11	11	(Finland) Harri Rovanperä	(Finland) Risto Pietiläinen	Red Bull Škoda Team	Škoda Fabia WRC	3:36:40.7	+8:24.4	0
12	12	9	(United Kingdom) Matthew Wilson	(United Kingdom) Michael Orr	Stobart VK M-Sport Ford Rally Team	Ford Focus RS WRC 04	3:38:08.2	+9:51.9	0
13	13	5	(Norway) Petter Solberg	(United Kingdom) Phil Mills	Subaru World Rally Team	Subaru Impreza WRC	3:38:08.2	+10:02.2	0
Retired SS19		1	(United Kingdom) Colin McRae	(United Kingdom) Nicky Grist	Kronos Citroën World Rally Team	Citroën Xsara WRC	Mechanical		0
Retired SS15		15	(Czech Republic) Jan Kopecký	(Czech Republic) Filip Schovánek	Czech RT Škoda Kopecký	Škoda Fabia WRC	Accident		0

==== Special Stages ====
All dates and times are EEST (UTC+3).

Day	Stage	Time	Name	Length (km)	Winner	Time	Rally leader
1 (13 Oct)	SS1	07:58	Perge 1	22.43	Stage cancelled		
1 (13 Oct)	SS2	08:41	Myra 1	24.14	Stage cancelled		
1 (13 Oct)	SS3	09:24	Kumluca 1	9.89	(Finland) Marcus Grönholm	7:42.7	(Finland) Marcus Grönholm
1 (13 Oct)	SS4	12:22	Perge 2	22.43	Stage cancelled		(Finland) Marcus Grönholm
1 (13 Oct)	SS5	13:05	Mrya 2	24.14	(Finland) Marcus Grönholm	8:54.0	(Finland) Marcus Grönholm
1 (13 Oct)	SS6	13:48	Kumluca 2	9.89	(Finland) Marcus Grönholm	7:21.3	(Finland) Marcus Grönholm
1 (13 Oct)	SS7	16:11	Tekirova 1	5.50	(Norway) Petter Solberg	4:46.5	(Finland) Marcus Grönholm
1 (13 Oct)	SS8	17:09	Phaselis	29.28	(Norway) Petter Solberg	24:17.1	(Finland) Marcus Grönholm
1 (13 Oct)	SS9	19:22	Akdeniz University 1	5.19	(Norway) Petter Solberg	4:12.6	(Finland) Marcus Grönholm
2 (14 Oct)	SS10	08:33	Kemer 1	20.50	(Norway) Petter Solberg	14:54.9	(Finland) Marcus Grönholm
2 (14 Oct)	SS11	09:21	Silyon 1	27.36	(Finland) Marcus Grönholm	20:55.9	(Finland) Marcus Grönholm
2 (14 Oct)	SS12	12:04	Kemer 2	20.50	(Finland) Marcus Grönholm	14:26.7	(Finland) Marcus Grönholm
2 (14 Oct)	SS13	12:52	Silyon 2	27.36	(Finland) Mikko Hirvonen	20:21.4	(Finland) Marcus Grönholm
2 (14 Oct)	SS14	16:00	Chimera 1	16.90	(Norway) Petter Solberg	12:22.5	(Finland) Marcus Grönholm
2 (14 Oct)	SS15	16:58	Phaselis 2	29.28	(Spain) Dani Sordo	24:52.3	(Finland) Marcus Grönholm
2 (14 Oct)	SS16	19:11	Akdeniz University 2	5.19	(Finland) Mikko Hirvonen	4:06.5	(Finland) Marcus Grönholm
3 (15 Oct)	SS17	09:48	Tekirova 2	5.50	(Belgium) François Duval	4:11.5	(Finland) Marcus Grönholm
3 (15 Oct)	SS18	10:31	Chimera 2	16.90	(Norway) Petter Solberg	12:06.9	(Finland) Marcus Grönholm
3 (15 Oct)	SS19	11:19	Olympos	28.54	(Norway) Petter Solberg	21:47.3	(Finland) Marcus Grönholm

==== Championship Standings ====
Pos.	Drivers' Championship			Manufacturers' Championship		
Pos.	Move	Driver	Points	Move	Manufacturer	Points
1		(France) Sébastien Loeb	112	1	(United Kingdom) BP Ford World Rally Team	153
2		(Finland) Marcus Gronholm	87	1	(Belgium) Kronos Citroën World Rally Team	145
3	1	(Finland) Mikko Hirvonen	47		(Japan) Subaru World Rally Team	83
4	1	(Spain) Dani Sordo	43		OMV Peugeot Norway World Rally Team	67
5		(Austria) Manfred Stohl	34		(United Kingdom) Stobart VK M-Sport Ford Rally Team	35

=== Junior WRC ===
==== Classification ====
Position		No.	Driver	Co-driver	Entrant	Car	Time	Difference	Points
Event	Class	No.	Driver	Co-driver	Entrant	Car	Time	Difference	Points
16	1	3	(Estonia) Urmo Aava	(Estonia) Kuldar Sikk	Suzuki Sport Europe	Suzuki Swift S1600	4:02:06.5	0.0	10
17	2	39	(Zimbabwe) Conrad Rautenbach	(United Kingdom) David Senior	Barroso Sport	Renault Clio 1600	4:02:37.2	+30.7	8
18	3	45	(Slovakia) Jozef Béreš	(Czech Republic) Petr Starý	Styllex Tuning Motorsport	Suzuki Ignis 1600	4:02:46.0	+39.5	6
19	4	48	(United Kingdom) Guy Wilks	(United Kingdom) Phil Pugh	Suzuki Sport Europe	Suzuki Swift 1600	4:04:16.6	+2:10.1	5
20	5	32	(United Kingdom) Kris Meeke	(United Kingdom) Glenn Patterson	PH Sport	Citroën C2 S1600	4:05:20.9	+3:14.4	4
21	6	49	(Czech Republic) Martin Prokop	(Czech Republic) Jan Tománek	Jipocar Czech National Team	Citroën C2 S1600	4:07:55.0	+5:48.5	3
22	7	42	(France) Juliern Pressac	(France) Jack Boyere	PH Sport	Citroën C2 S1600	4:12:23.0	+10:16.5	2
24	8	52	(Belgium) Bernd Casier	(Belgium) Frédéric Miclotte	Renault Sport	Renault Clio 1600	4:15:10.9	+13:04.4	1
25	9	51	(Turkey) Fatih Kara	(Turkey) Cerm Bakancocuklari	Renault Sport	Renault Clio 1600	4:16:24.4	+14:17.9	0
27	10	44	(Poland) Michał Kościuszko	(Czech Republic) Jaroslaw Baran	Suzuki Sport Europe	Suzuki Swift 1600	4:20:10.2	+18:03.7	0
30	11	41	(Sweden) Patrik Sandell	(Sweden) Emil Axelsson	Renault Sport	Renault Clio 1600	4:24:17.3	+22:10.8	0
31	12	54	(Germany) Aaron Burkart	(Germany) Tanja Geilhausen	OMV Rally Team	Citroën C2 S1600	4:29:53.9	+27:47.4	0
32	13	37	(Czech Republic) Pavel Valoušek	(Czech Republic) Zdeněk Hrůza	Suzuki Sport Europe	Suzuki Swift 1600	4:30:42.6	+28:36.1	0
41	14	55	(France) Fabio Fiandino	(France) Sabrina de Castelli	PH Sport	Citroën C2 R2	4:45:33.0	+43:26.5	0
43	15	46	(Italy) Andrea Cortinovis	(Italy) Flavio Zanella	Power Car Team	Renault Clio RS	5:02:32.9	+1:00:26.4	0
Retired SS19		35	(Sweden) Per-Gunnar Andersson	(Sweden) Jonas Andersson	Suzuki Sport Europe	Suzuki Swift 1600	Excluded		0
Retired SS18		43	(Estonia) Jaan Mölder	(Germany) Katrin Becker	JM Engineering	Suzuki Ignis 1600	Engine		0

==== Championship Standings ====
Pos.	Drivers' Championship		
Pos.	Move	Driver	Points
1	3	(Estonia) Urmo Aava	30
2	1	(Sweden) Per-Gunnar Andersson	29
3	1	(Sweden) Patrik Sandell	28
4	1	(United Kingdom) Guy Wilks	26
5		(Zimbabwe) Conrad Rautenbach	25
