= Jozef Béreš Jr. =

Slovak rally driver (born 1984)

Jozef Béreš jun.
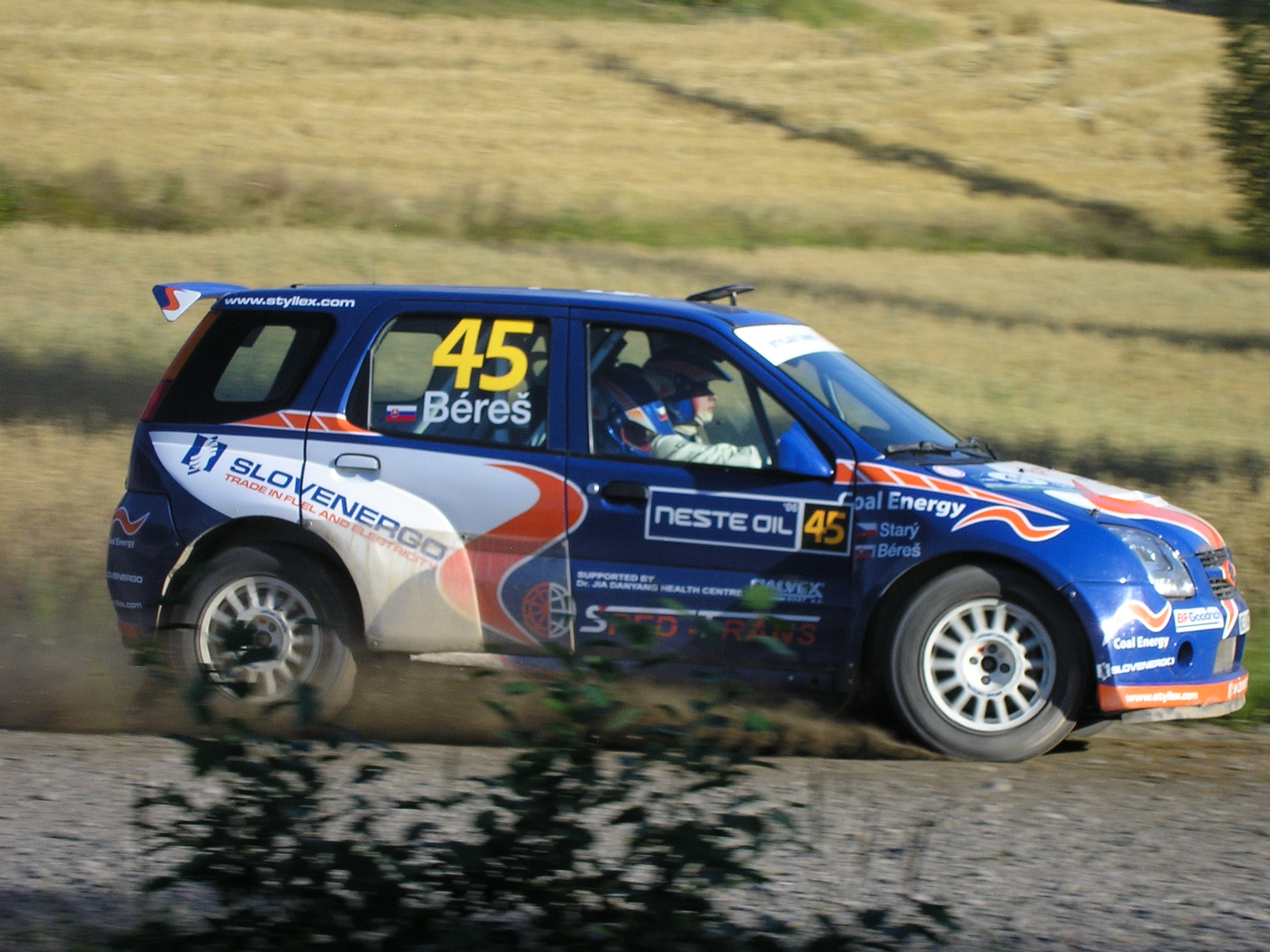
- Béreš at the 2006 Rally Finland

Personal information
- Nationality: (Slovakia) Slovak
- Born: October 4, 1984 (age 42)

World Rally Championship record
- Years active: 2003–2007
- Co-driver: (Czech Republic) Petr Starý
- Teams: OMV World Rally Team
- Rallies: 20
- Championships: 0
- Rally wins: 0
- Podiums: 0
- Stage wins: 0
- Total points: 0
- First rally: 2003 Swedish Rally
- Last rally: 2007 Tour de Corse

Jozef Béreš jun. (born 4 October 1984) is a Slovak rally driver. He used to race in the JWRC in the 2006 and 2007 season. He became Slovak Rally Champion five times 2005, 2008, 2009, 2010, 2011.

== WRC results ==
Year	Entrant	Car	1	2	3	4	5	6	7	8	9	10	11	12	13	14	15	16	WDC	Points
2003	Styllex Tuning Motorsport	Toyota Corolla WRC	MON	SWE; 34	TUR	NZL	ARG	GRE; Ret	CYP	GER	FIN	AUS	ITA	FRA	ESP	GBR; Ret			-	0
2004	Styllex Tuning Motorsport	Hyundai Accent WRC	MON; 9	SWE; Ret	MEX	NZL	CYP	GRE; Ret	TUR	ARG									-	0
2004	Styllex Tuning Motorsport	Subaru Impreza WRX STi									FIN; Ret	GER	JPN	GBR	ITA; Ret	FRA	ESP	AUS	-	0
2006	Jozef Béreš jun.	Suzuki Ignis S1600	MON	SWE; 30	MEX	ESP; 21	FRA; 21	ARG	ITA	GRE	GER	FIN; 25	JPN	CYP	TUR; 18	AUS	NZL	GBR; 44	-	0
2007	Jozef Béreš jun.	Renault Clio S1600	MON	SWE	NOR	MEX	POR; 18	ARG	ITA; 25	GRE	FIN; Ret	GER; 25	NZL	ESP; 22	FRA; 18	JPN	IRE	GBR	-	0

=== JWRC results ===
Year	Entrant	Car	1	2	3	4	5	6	7	8	9	JWRC	Points
2006	Jozef Béreš jun.	Suzuki Ignis S1600	SWE; 6	ESP; 4	FRA; 5	ARG	ITA	GER	FIN; 5	TUR; 3	GBR; 10	6th	22
2007	Jozef Béreš jun.	Renault Clio S1600	NOR	POR; 3	ITA; 6	FIN; Ret	GER; 5	ESP; 4	FRA; 2			4th	26
