= Martin Prokop =

Czech rally driver (born 1982)

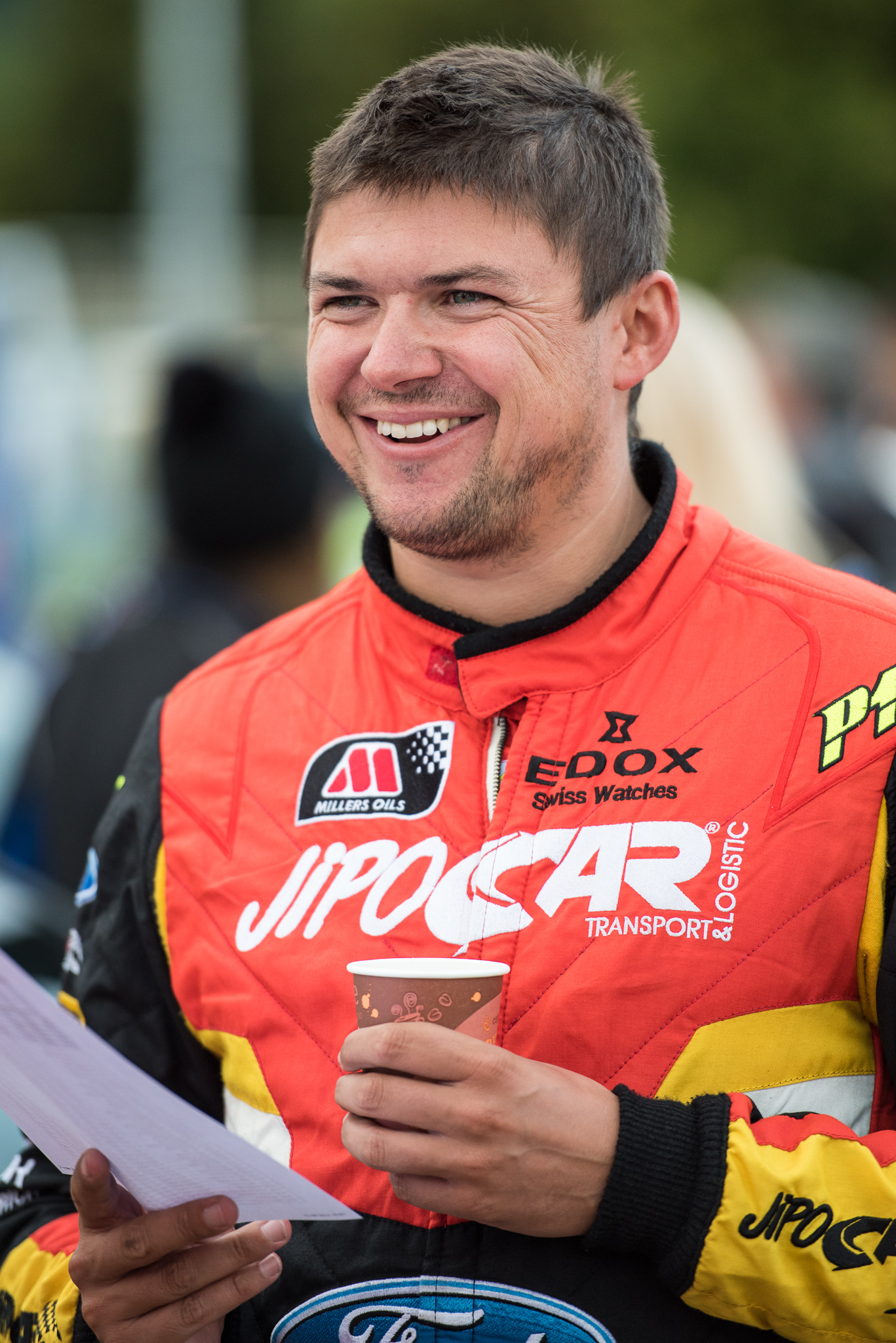
- Prokop at the 2014 Rallye Deutschland.

Personal information
- Nationality: (Czech Republic) Czech
- Born: 4 October 1982 (age 44); Jihlava, Czechoslovakia

World Rally Championship record
- Years active: 2005–present
- Teams: Czech Ford National Team, Jipocar Czech National Team
- Rallies: 145
- Championships: 0
- Rally wins: 0
- Podiums: 0
- Stage wins: 3
- Total points: 216
- First rally: 2005 Monte Carlo Rally

Martin Prokop (Czech pronunciation: [ˈmar.tɪn ˈpro.kop], born 4 October 1982) is a Czech rally driver. He won the Junior World Rally Championship in the 2009 season.

== Career ==
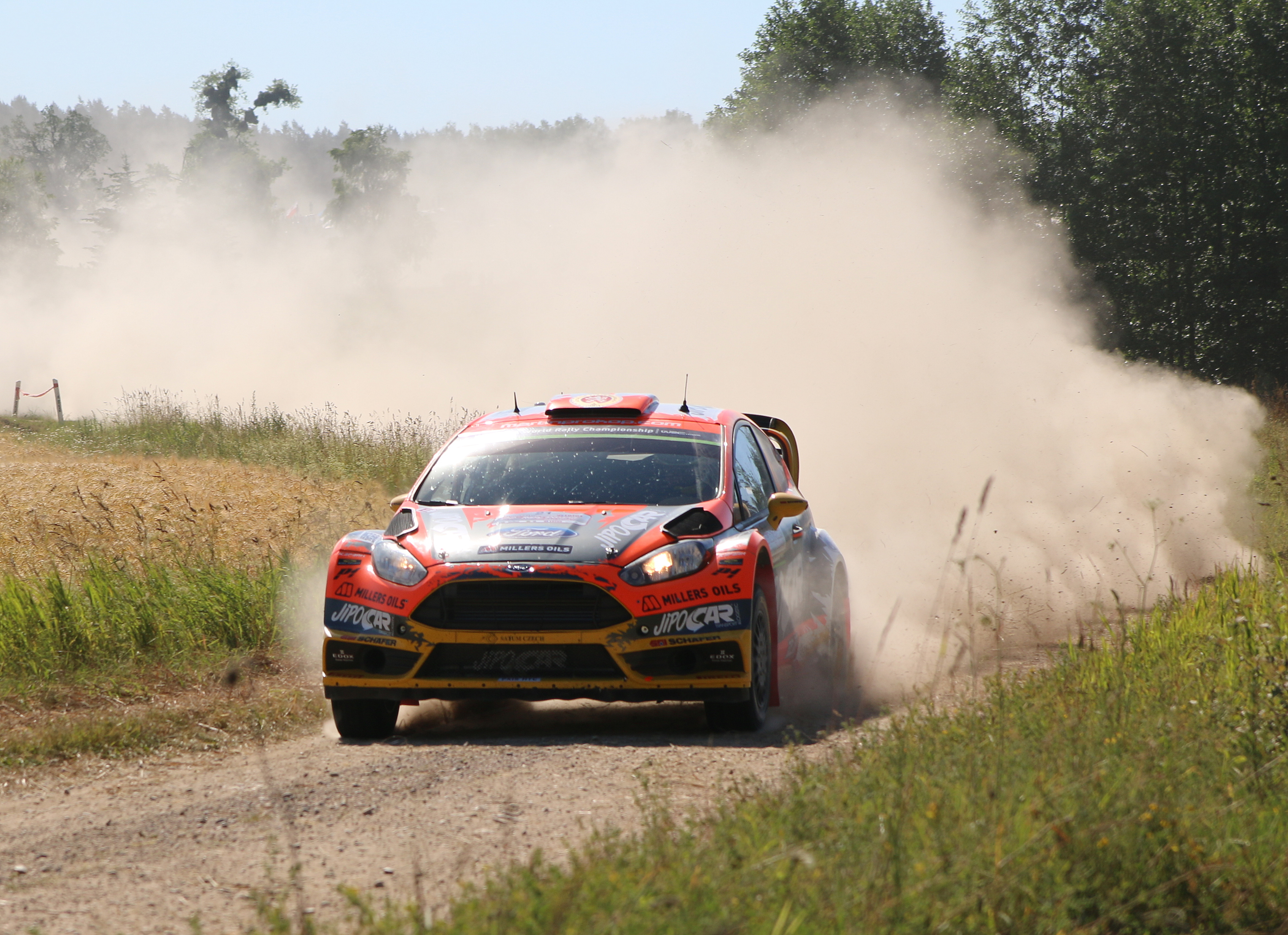
Prokop at the 2015 Rally Poland.

After competing in the Czech Rally Championship for four years, Prokop debuted in the World Rally Championship at the 2005 Monte Carlo Rally, finishing ninth in the Junior World Rally Championship (JWRC) category. He ended his season with the same position in the overall junior standings. In the 2006 season, Prokop took his first JWRC win at the Rally Catalunya and finished tenth in the championship.

In 2007, Prokop continued in the junior class and won the Rallye Deutschland and the Tour de Corse. In the overall standings, he placed third behind the two Swifts of Per-Gunnar Andersson and Urmo Aava. In the 2008 season, Prokop contested both the JWRC and the Production World Rally Championship (PWRC), finishing third and fifth, respectively.

In 2009, Prokop continued competing in both WRC support championships. In August 2009, he secured the junior world title with a win at the Rally Finland, after earlier driving his Citroën C2 S1600 to victory in Cyprus and Italy. He finished second in PWRC 2009 standings after Armindo Araujo.

In 2010, Prokop switched to SWRC with Ford Fiesta S2000. He is first driver who won special stage of WRC rally with s2000 car, it was SS16 at 2010 Rally Sweden. Prokop had strong results during the season third at Rally Sweden, second at Rally Mexico, Rallye Deutschland and Rally Japan. Prokop had chances to become SWRC champion at Rallye de France, but because of his problems with power steering he was losing time every stage and finished sixth.

In 2016, Prokop started at Dakar Rally, competing fellow debuting world rally drivers Mikko Hirvonen and Sébastien Loeb. He missed first two rallies of the season but joined at 2016 Rally Mexico and finished seventh.

== Racing record ==
=== WRC results ===
Year	Entrant	Car	1	2	3	4	5	6	7	8	9	10	11	12	13	14	15	16	WDC	Points
2005	Martin Prokop	Suzuki Ignis S1600	MON; 21	SWE	MEX	NZL	ITA; 24	CYP	TUR	GRE; 27	ARG	FIN; 36	GER; Ret	GBR; Ret	JPN	FRA; 22	ESP; 22	AUS	NC	0
2006	Martin Prokop	Citroën C2 S1600	MON; 20	SWE; 45	MEX	ESP; 17	FRA; 20	ARG	ITA; 37	GRE	GER; 22	FIN; 35	JPN	CYP	TUR; 21	AUS	NZL	GBR; 25	NC	0
2007	Martin Prokop	Citroën C2 S1600	MON; 20		NOR	MEX	POR; Ret	ARG	ITA; 16		FIN; Ret	GER; 11	NZL	ESP; 17	FRA; 17	JPN	IRE		NC	0
2007	Martin Prokop	Mitsubishi Lancer Evolution IX		SWE; Ret						GRE; 20								GBR; 20	NC	0
2008	Martin Prokop	Citroën C2 S1600			MEX; 22			ITA; 30			FIN; 20	GER; Ret		ESP; 16	FRA; 19	JPN			NC	0
2008	Martin Prokop	Mitsubishi Lancer Evolution IX	MON	SWE; 12		ARG; 15	JOR		GRE; 34	TUR; DSQ			NZL; 10				GBR; Ret		NC	0
2009	Martin Prokop	Citroën C2 S1600	IRE; 17		CYP; 14			ITA; 12		POL; 12	FIN; 14		ESP; Ret						NC	0
2009	Martin Prokop	Mitsubishi Lancer Evolution IX		NOR; 15		POR; 10	ARG; DSQ		GRE; 12			AUS; 10		GBR; 10					NC	0
2010	Czech Ford National Team	Ford Fiesta S2000	SWE; 14	MEX; 9	JOR	TUR	NZL; 11	POR	BUL	FIN; 13	GER; 11		FRA; 21	ESP	GBR				18th	3
2010	Barwa Rally Team	Ford Fiesta S2000										JPN; 10							18th	3
2011	Czech Ford National Team	Ford Fiesta S2000	SWE; 12	MEX; 7	POR	JOR	ITA; 10	ARG	GRE; 15	FIN; 12	GER; 30	AUS	FRA; 14	ESP; 13					19th	7
2011	Czech Ford National Team	Ford Fiesta RS WRC													GBR; 22				19th	7
2012	Czech Ford National Team	Ford Fiesta RS WRC	MON; 9	SWE; 9	MEX	POR; 5		GRE; 5	NZL	FIN; 9	GER; Ret	GBR; 9	FRA; 9	ITA; 8					9th	46
2012	Autotek Motorsport	Ford Fiesta RS WRC					ARG; 4								ESP; 13				9th	46
2013	Jipocar Czech National Team	Ford Fiesta RS WRC	MON; 7	SWE; 7	MEX; 9	POR; 7	ARG; 10	GRE; 7	ITA; 5	FIN; Ret	GER; 4	AUS	FRA; Ret	ESP; 7	GBR; 6				9th	63
2014	Jipocar Czech National Team	Ford Fiesta RS WRC	MON; Ret	SWE; Ret	MEX; 5	POR; 6	ARG; 8	ITA; 6	POL; 10	FIN; Ret	GER; 7	AUS	FRA; 10	ESP; 8	GBR; 9				9th	44
2015	Jipocar Czech National Team	Ford Fiesta RS WRC	MON; 9	SWE; 8	MEX; 6	ARG; 4	POR; 10	ITA; Ret	POL; 11	FIN; 7	GER; Ret	AUS	FRA; 12	ESP; 7	GBR; Ret				11th	39
2016	Jipocar Czech National Team	Ford Fiesta RS WRC	MON	SWE	MEX; 7	ARG	POR; 8	ITA; 9	POL	FIN	GER	CHN; C	FRA	ESP; Ret	GBR	AUS			15th	12
2017	OneBet Jipocar Czech National Team	Ford Fiesta RS WRC	MON	SWE	MEX	FRA	ARG	POR; 14	ITA; 28	POL	FIN	GER	ESP	GBR	AUS				NC	0
2018	MP-Sports	Ford Fiesta RS WRC	MON	SWE	MEX	FRA	ARG	POR	ITA; 11	FIN	GER	TUR	GBR	ESP	AUS				NC	0
2019	MP-Sports	Ford Fiesta RS WRC	MON	SWE	MEX	FRA	ARG	CHL	POR	ITA; 15	FIN	GER	TUR	GBR	ESP	AUS; C			NC	0
2020	MP-Sports	Ford Fiesta RS WRC	MON	SWE	MEX	EST	TUR	ITA; 15	MNZ										NC	0
2021	M-Sport Ford WRT	Ford Fiesta R5 Mk. II	MON	ARC; 21	CRO	POR; 20	ITA; 13	KEN; Ret	EST	BEL	GRE; 16	FIN; 16	ESP	MNZ					NC	0
2022	Martin Prokop	Ford Fiesta Rally2	MON	SWE	CRO	POR; 16	ITA; 16	KEN; Ret	EST	FIN; 17	BEL	GRE; 14	NZL	ESP	JPN				NC	0
2023	Martin Prokop	Ford Fiesta Rally2	MON	SWE	MEX; 11	CRO	POR	ITA; 13	KEN; 10	EST	FIN	GRE; 15	CHL	EUR	JPN				27th	1
2024	Martin Prokop	Ford Fiesta Rally2	MON	SWE	KEN	CRO	POR; 14	ITA; 9	POL; 20	LAT	FIN; 18	GRE	CHL	EUR	JPN				33rd	1

==== JWRC results ====
Year	Entrant	Car	1	2	3	4	5	6	7	8	9	JWRC	Points
2005	Martin Prokop	Suzuki Ignis S1600	MON; 9	MEX	ITA; 7	GRE; 7	FIN; 6	GER; Ret	FRA; 7	ESP; 5		9th	13
2006	Martin Prokop	Citroën C2 S1600	SWE; 11	ESP; 1	FRA	ARG	ITA; 11	GER; 5	FIN; 8	TUR; 6	GBR	10th	18
2007	Martin Prokop	Citroën C2 S1600	NOR	POR; Ret	ITA; 3	FIN; Ret	GER; 1	ESP; 2	FRA; 1			3rd	34
2008	Martin Prokop	Citroën C2 S1600	MEX; 7	JOR	ITA; 10	FIN; 1	GER; Ret	ESP; 1	FRA; 1			3rd	32
2009	Martin Prokop	Citroën C2 S1600	IRE; 2	CYP; 1	POR	ARG	ITA; 1	POL; 2	FIN; 1	ESP; Ret		1st	42

==== PWRC results ====
Year	Entrant	Car	1	2	3	4	5	6	7	8	PWRC	Points
2007	Martin Prokop	Mitsubishi Lancer Evolution IX	SWE; Ret	MEX	ARG	GRE	NZL	JPN	IRE	GBR	NC	0
2008	Martin Prokop	Mitsubishi Lancer Evolution IX	SWE; 4	ARG; 7	GRE; 14	TUR; DSQ	FIN	NZL; 1	JAP	GBR; Ret	5th	17
2009	Martin Prokop	Mitsubishi Lancer Evolution IX	NOR; 3	CYP	POR; 2	ARG; DSQ	ITA	GRE; 4	AUS; 1	GBR; 1	2nd	39

==== SWRC results ====
Year	Entrant	Car	1	2	3	4	5	6	7	8	9	10	SWRC	Points
2010	Czech Ford National Team	Ford Fiesta S2000	SWE; 3	MEX; 2	JOR	NZL; 3	POR	FIN; 4	GER; 2		FRA; 6	GBR	3rd	104
2010	Barwa Rally Team	Ford Fiesta S2000								JPN; 2			3rd	104
2011	Czech Ford National Team	Ford Fiesta S2000	MEX; 1	JOR	ITA; 3	GRE; 5	FIN; 2	GER; 6	FRA; 3	ESP; 3			3rd	106

=== WRC-Trophy results ===
Year	Entrant	Car	1	2	3	4	5	6	7	8	9	10	11	12	13	Pos.	Points
2017	OneBet Jipocar Czech National Team	Ford Fiesta RS WRC	MON	SWE	MEX	FRA	ARG	POR; 1	ITA; 3	POL	FIN	GER	ESP	GBR	AUS	4th	40

=== WRC-2 results ===
Year	Entrant	Car	1	2	3	4	5	6	7	8	9	10	11	12	13	14	Pos.	Points
2021	M-Sport Ford WRT	Ford Fiesta R5 Mk. II	MON	ARC; 6	CRO	POR; 7	ITA; 4	KEN; Ret	EST	BEL	GRE; 5	FIN; 4	ESP	MNZ			9th	51
2022	Martin Prokop	Ford Fiesta Rally2	MON	SWE	CRO	POR; 7	ITA; 9	KEN; Ret	EST	FIN; 8	BEL	GRE; 8	NZL	ESP	JPN		25th	16
2023	Martin Prokop	Ford Fiesta Rally2	MON	SWE	MEX; 5	CRO	POR	ITA; 9	KEN; 2	EST	FIN	GRE; 8	CHL	EUR	JPN		13th	36
2024	Martin Prokop	Škoda Fabia RS Rally2	MON	SWE	KEN	CRO	POR; 7	ITA; 4	POL; 12	LAT	FIN; 11	GRE	CHL	EUR	JPN		20th	18
2025	Martin Prokop	Škoda Fabia RS Rally2	MON	SWE	KEN	ESP	POR	ITA; 3	GRE; 6	EST	FIN; 7	PAR	CHL	EUR	JPN	SAU	16th	29
2026	Martin Prokop	Škoda Fabia RS Rally2	MON	SWE	KEN	CRO	ESP	POR	JPN	GRE; Ret	EST	FIN; 14	PAR	CHL	ITA		NC	0

=== IRC results ===
Year	Entrant	Car	1	2	3	4	5	6	7	8	9	10	11	12	WDC	Points
2006	Martin Prokop	Citroën C2 S1600	RSA	YPR; 11	MAD	ITA									-	0
2009	BF Goodrich Drivers Team	Peugeot 207 S2000	MON	BRA	KEN	POR	BEL	RUS	POR	CZE; 5	ESP	ITA	SCO		27th	4
2010	Czech Ford Rally Team	Ford Fiesta S2000	MON	BRA	ARG	CAN	ITA	BEL	AZO	MAD	CZE	ITA	SCO	CYP; 3	13th	6

=== Czech Rally Championship results ===
Year	Entrant	Car	1	2	3	4	5	6	7	8	9	MMČR	Points
2001	Elsev Racing Team	Mitsubishi Lancer Evo VI	ŠUM	VAL	KRU	BOH	BAR	PŘÍ	TŘE; 15			-	0
2002	Elsev Racing Team	Mitsubishi Lancer Evo VI	ŠUM; Ret	VAL	KRU	BOH						23rd	24
2002	Jipocar Racing	Mitsubishi Lancer Evo VI						PŘÍ; 15				23rd	24
2002	Jipocar Racing	Mitsubishi Lancer Evo VII					BAR; Ret		TŘE; 8			23rd	24
2003	Jipocar Racing	Mitsubishi Lancer Evo VII	ŠUM; 25	VAL; 10	KRU; 11	BOH; 27	BAR; Ret	PŘÍ; 16	TŘE; 9			14th	18
2004	Jipocar Racing	Škoda Octavia WRC	JÄN; 11	ŠUM; 1	TAT; 4	KRU; 6	BOH; Ret	BAR; Ret	PŘÍ	TŘE		5th	60
2005	Martin Prokop	Suzuki Ignis S1600	JÄN; 22	ŠUM; 21	VAL; 4	TAT	KRU; 6	BOH; 23	BAR; Ret	PŘÍ	TŘE	14th	25
2006	Jipocar Racing	Citroën C2 S1600	JÄN	ŠUM	TAT	KRU	BOH; 3	BAR; 5	TŘE	PŘÍ		12th	31
2007	Jipocar Czech National Team	Citroën C2 S1600	JÄN	ŠUM	KRU	BOH; 3	HOR	BAR	PŘÍ			-	0
2009	BF Goodrich Drivers Team	Peugeot 207 S2000	VAL	ŠUM	KRU	HUS	BAR; 4	PŘÍ	BOH			-	0
2010	Czech Ford National Team	Ford Fiesta S2000	VAL	ŠUM	KRU	HUS	BOH; 1	BAR	PŘÍ			-	0

== Dakar Rally results ==
Year	Class	Vehicle	Position	Stages won
2016	Cars	(Japan) Toyota	14th	0
2017	Cars	(United States) Ford	11th	0
2018	Cars	(United States) Ford	7th	0
2019	Cars	(United States) Ford	6th	0
2020	Cars	(United States) Ford	12th	0
2021	Cars	(United States) Ford	9th	0
2022	Cars	(United States) Ford	25th	0
2023	Cars	(United States) Ford	6th	0
2024	Cars	(United States) Ford	5th	0
2025	Cars	(United States) Ford	10th	0
2026	Cars	(United States) Ford	23rd	0

Sporting positions
Preceded by Sébastien Ogier	Junior World Rally Champion; 2009	Succeeded by Aaron Burkart
