= 2006 Rally Finland =

Motor rally competition

2006 Rally Finland 56th Neste Oil Rally Finland
Round 10 of 16 in the 2006 World Rally Championship
| ← Previous event | Next event → |
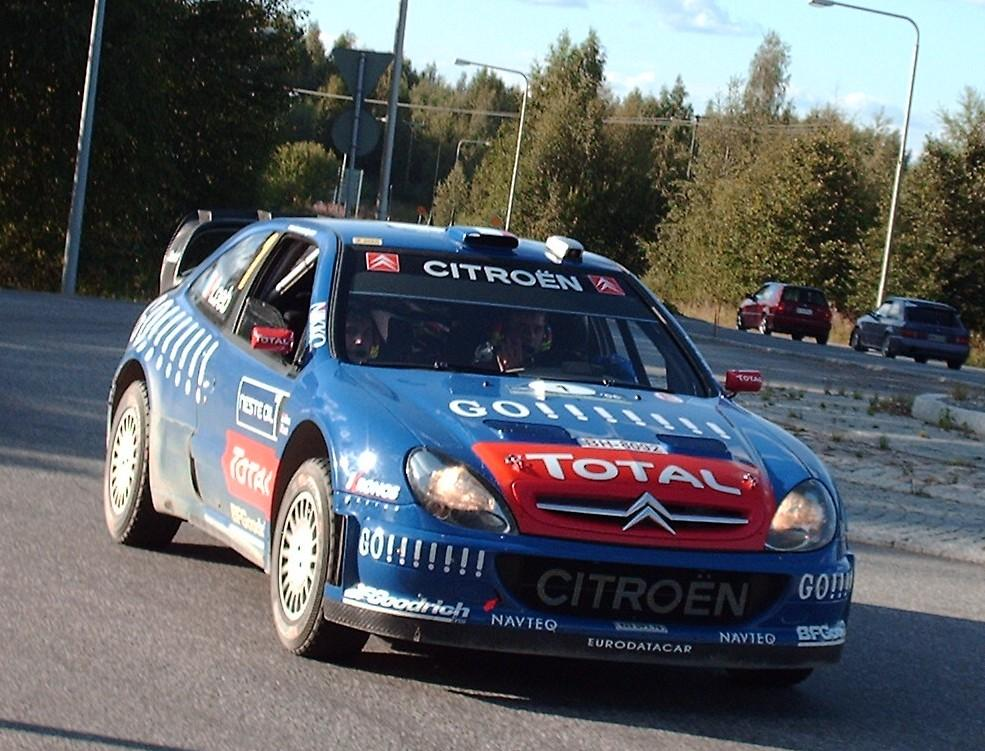
- Sébastien Loeb coming into service.
- Host country: Finland
- Rally base: Jyväskylä
- Dates run: 17 – 20 August 2006
- Stages: 21 (351.61 km; 218.48 miles)
- Stage surface: Gravel
- Transport distance: 1,172.73 km (728.70 miles)
- Overall distance: 1,524.34 km (947.18 miles)

Statistics
- Crews registered: 101
- Crews: 101 at start, 68 at finish

Overall results
- Overall winner: (Finland) Marcus Gronholm (Finland) Timo Rautiainen (United Kingdom) BP Ford World Rally Team; 2:52:50.3

Support category results
- J-WRC winner: (United Kingdom) Guy Wilks (United Kingdom) Phil Pugh (Japan) Suzuki Sport Europe; 3:16:05.7

The 2006 Neste Oil Rally Finland was a motor racing event for rally cars that was held over four days between 17 and 20 August 2006. It marked the 56th running of the Rally Finland, and was the tenth round of the 2006 World Rally Championship season. The event was also the seventh round of the 2006 Junior WRC. The 2006 event was based in the city of Jyväskylä in Finland and was contested over twenty one special stages, covering a total competitive distance of 351.61km (218.48 miles).

Sebastien Loeb, along with Kronos Citroën World Rally Team were the defending rally winners, leading championship rival Marcus Gronholm in the championship by 33 points. Red Bull Škoda Team would miss the event.

Gronholm and co-driver Timo Rautiainen won the rally, their first win since the 2006 Acropolis Rally and their fourth win of the season.

== Background ==
=== Entry list ===
The following crews were set to enter the rally. The event was open to crews competing in the World Rally Championship and its support category, the Junior WRC, as well as privateer entries that were not registered to score points in the manufacturer's championship. Twenty seven were entered under World Rally Car regulations, as were eighteen in the Junior WRC category.

World Rally Car entries competing in the World Rally Championship
| No. | Driver | Co-Driver | Entrant | Car | Tyre |
|---|---|---|---|---|---|
| 1 | (France) Sebastien Loeb | (Monaco) Daniel Elena | (Belgium) Kronos Citroën World Rally Team | Citroën Xsara WRC | BF |
| 2 | (Spain) Dani Sordo | (Spain) Marc Martí | (Belgium) Kronos Citroën World Rally Team | Citroën Xsara WRC | BF |
| 3 | (Finland) Marcus Gronholm | (Finland) Timo Rautiainen | (United Kingdom) BP Ford World Rally Team | Ford Focus RS WRC 06 | BF |
| 4 | (Finland) Mikko Hirvonen | (Finland) Jarmo Lehtinen | (United Kingdom) BP Ford World Rally Team | Ford Focus RS WRC 06 | BF |
| 5 | (Norway) Petter Solberg | (United Kingdom) Phil Mills | (Japan) Subaru World Rally Team | Impreza WRC 2006 | P |
| 6 | (Australia) Chris Atkinson | (Australia) Glenn Macneall | (Japan) Subaru World Rally Team | Impreza WRC 2006 | P |
| 7 | (Austria) Manfred Stohl | (Austria) Ilka Minor | OMV Peugeot Norway World Rally Team | Peugeot 307 WRC | BF |
| 8 | (Norway) Henning Solberg | (Norway) Cato Menkerud | OMV Peugeot Norway World Rally Team | Peugeot 307 WRC | BF |
| 9 | (United Kingdom) Matthew Wilson | (United Kingdom) Michael Orr | (United Kingdom) Stobart VK M-Sport Ford Rally Team | Ford Focus RS WRC 04 | BF |
| 10 | (Finland) Kosti Katajamäki | (Finland) Timo Alanne | (United Kingdom) Stobart VK M-Sport Ford Rally Team | Ford Focus RS WRC 04 | BF |

Super 1600 entries competing in the Junior WRC
| No. | Driver | Co-Driver | Entrant | Car |
|---|---|---|---|---|
| 32 | (United Kingdom) Kris Meeke | (United Kingdom) Glenn Patterson | (France) PH Sport | Citroën C2 S1600 |
| 33 | (Estonia) Urmo Aava | (Estonia) Kuldar Sikk | (Japan) Suzuki Sport Europe | Suzuki Swift 1600 |
| 35 | (Sweden) Per-Gunnar Andersson | (Sweden) Jonas Andersson | (Japan) Suzuki Sport Europe | Suzuki Swift 1600 |
| 37 | (Czech Republic) Pavel Valoušek | (Czech Republic) Zdeněk Hrůza | (Japan) Suzuki Sport Europe | Suzuki Swift 1600 |
| 39 | (Zimbabwe) Conrad Rautenbach | (United Kingdom) David Senior | (France) Barroso Sport | Renault Clio 1600 |
| 41 | (Sweden) Patrik Sandell | (Sweden) Emil Axelsson | (France) Renault Sport | Renault Clio 1600 |
| 42 | (France) Julien Pressac | (France) Jack Boyere | (France) PH Sport | Citroën C2 S1600 |
| 43 | (Estonia) Jaan Mölder | (Germany) Katrin Becker | (Czech Republic) JM Engineering | Suzuki Ignis 1600 |
| 44 | (Poland) Michał Kościuszko | (Czech Republic) Jaroslaw Baran | (Japan) Suzuki Sport Europe | Suzuki Swift 1600 |
| 45 | (Slovakia) Jozef Béreš | (Czech Republic) Petr Starý | (Slovakia) Styllex Tuning Motorsport | Suzuki Ignis 1600 |
| 46 | (Italy) Andrea Cortinovis | (Italy) Flavio Zanella | (Italy) Power Car Team | Renault Clio RS |
| 47 | (Italy) Filippo Bordignon | (Italy) James Bardini | (Italy) Hawk Racing Club | Opel Astra OPC |
| 48 | (United Kingdom) Guy Wilks | (United Kingdom) Phil Pugh | (Japan) Suzuki Sport Europe | Suzuki Swift 1600 |
| 49 | (Czech Republic) Martin Prokop | (Czech Republic) Jan Tománek | (Czech Republic) Jipocar Czech National Team | Citroën C2 S1600 |
| 50 | (Finland) Kalle Pinomäki | (Finland) Jani Laaksonen | (Finland) Clio Junior Team | Renault Clio 1600 |
| 53 | (United Kingdom) Barry Clark | (United Kingdom) Scott Martin | (France) Stobart VK M-Sport Ford Rally Team | Ford Fiesta ST |
| 55 | (France) Fabio Fiandino | (France) Sabrina de Castelli | (France) PH Sport | Citroën C2 R2 |
| 59 | (Finland) Matti Rantanen | (Finland) Jan Lönegren | (Finland) Motor Stars | Honda Civic Type-R |

Other major entries
| No. | Driver | Co-Driver | Entrant | Car |
|---|---|---|---|---|
| 14 | (Spain) Xavier Pons | (Spain) Carlos del Barrio | (Belgium) Kronos Racing | Citroën Xsara WRC |
| 15 | (Sweden) Daniel Carlsson | (Sweden) Tomas Thorszelius | (United Kingdom) MMSP LTD | Mitsubishi Lancer WRC 05 |
| 16 | (Czech Republic) Jan Kopecký | (Czech Republic) Filip Schovánek | (Czech Republic) Czech RT Škoda Kopecký | Škoda Fabia WRC |
| 18 | (Finland) Jussi Välimäki | (Finland) Jarkko Kalliolepo | (United Kingdom) MMSP LTD | Mitsubishi Lancer WRC 05 |
| 19 | (Finland) Kristian Sohlberg | (Finland) Risto Pietiläinen | (Turkey) Red Devil Atolye Kazaz | Subaru Impreza S11 WRC 05 |
| 20 | (Finland) Janne Tuohino | (Finland) Mikko Markkula | (France) PH Sport | Citroën Xsara WRC |
| 21 | (Finland) Jari-Matti Latvala | (Finland) Asko Sairanen | (Italy) Motoring Club | Toyota Corolla WRC |
| 22 | (Finland) Juho Hänninen | (Finland) Marko Sallinen | (United Kingdom) MMSP LTD | Mitsubishi Lancer WRC 05 |
| 24 | (Norway) Thomas Schie | (Sweden) Göran Bergsten | (Norway) Thomas Schie | Ford Focus RS WRC 04 |
| 25 | (Italy) Gianluigi Galli | (Italy) Giovanni Bernacchini | (Italy) Gianluigi Galli | Peugeot 307 WRC |
| 26 | (Finland) Jukka Ketomäki | (Finland) Kai Risberg | (Finland) Jukka Ketomäki | Skoda Octavia WRC |
| 27 | (Norway) Mads Østberg | (Norway) Ole Kristian Unnerud | (Norway) Adapta AS | Subaru Impreza S9 WRC 03 |
| 79 | (Italy) Fabrizio de Sanctis | (Italy) Iuri Rosignoli | (Italy) Fabrizio de Sanctis | Mitsubishi Lancer Evo VI |
| 82 | (Russia) Igor Sokolov | (Russia) Vasily Mirkotan | (Russia) Syrus Rally Team | Mitsubishi Lancer Evo VI |
| 86 | (Finland) Mika Jokela | (Finland) Tapio Järvinen | (Finland) Mika Jokela | Mitsubishi Lancer Evo VII |
| 87 | (Finland) Pekka Savela | (Finland) Pasi Lahtinen | (Finland) Pekka Savela | Mitsubishi Lancer Evo VIII |
| 94 | (Finland) Tapio Vuokila | (Finland) Jari Jaakola | (Finland) Tapio Vuokila | Mitsubishi Lancer Evo VI |

=== Itinerary ===
All dates and times are EEST (UTC+3).

| Date | No. | Time span | Stage name | Distance |
|---|---|---|---|---|
| 17 August | — | After 8:00 | Laajavouri [Shakedown] | 3.76 km |
| 17 August | SS1 | After 20:00 | Killeri 1 | 2.06 km |
| 18 August | | 8:00 | Service A, Jyväskylä | —N/a |
| 18 August | SS2 | After 9:21 | Lankamaa | 24.98 km |
| 18 August | SS3 | After 10:09 | Laukaa | 11.82 km |
| 18 August | SS4 | After 11:04 | Ruuhimäki | 7.57 km |
| 18 August | | 11:58 | Service B, Jyväskylä | —N/a |
| 18 August | SS5 | After 13:08 | Vellipohja 1 | 36.39 km |
| 18 August | SS6 | After 14:17 | Mökkiperä 1 | 12.61 km |
| 18 August | | 15:26 | Service C, Jyväskylä | —N/a |
| 18 August | SS7 | After 16:36 | Vellipohja 2 | 36.39 km |
| 18 August | SS8 | After 17:45 | Mökkiperä 2 | 12.61 km |
| 18 August | SS9 | After 20:00 | Killeri 2 | 2.06 km |
| 18 August | | 20:27 | Service D, Jyväskylä | —N/a |
| 19 August | | 6:00 | Service E, Jyväskylä | —N/a |
| 19 August | SS10 | After 7:06 | Vaheri | 19.91 km |
| 19 August | SS11 | After 8:20 | Ouninpohja Lansi 1 | 13.98 km |
| 19 August | SS12 | After 8:43 | Ouninpohja Ita 1 | 16.55 km |
| 19 August | | 10:28 | Service F, Jyväskylä | —N/a |
| 19 August | SS13 | After 11:44 | Urria | 10.00 km |
| 19 August | SS14 | After 13:07 | Ouninpohja Lansi 2 | 13.98 km |
| 19 August | SS15 | After 13:30 | Ouninpohja Ita 2 | 13.98 km |
| 19 August | | 15:15 | Service G, Jyväskylä | —N/a |
| 19 August | SS16 | After 16:48 | Moksi - Leutsu | 40.96 km |
| 19 August | SS17 | After 18:04 | Himos | 12.97 km |
| 19 August | | 19:49 | Service H, Jyväskylä | —N/a |
| 20 August | | 8:30 | Service I, Jyväskylä | —N/a |
| 20 August | SS18 | After 9:14 | Kuohu 1 | 7.80 km |
| 20 August | SS19 | After 10:27 | Jukojärvi 1 | 22.31 km |
| 20 August | SS20 | After 11:45 | Kuohu 2 | 7.80 km |
| 20 August | SS21 | After 12:58 | Jukojärvi 2 | 22.31 km |
| 20 August | | 14:26 | Service J, Jyväskylä | —N/a |

== Report ==
=== Overall ===
==== Summary ====
The first stage of the event would be held on Thursday night, where Loeb would be fastest. Despite this, Loeb was unsure of his ability to keep the lead throughout the rest of the rally.

Loeb's fears of not being able to manage first were not unfounded; by mid-day on Friday, he would fall to fourth as his championship rival Gronholm took the lead. In the latter half of the day, Loeb would fight back and move back up to second position, trailing Gronholm by twelve seconds by the end of the day. Hirvonen would take up his typical position in third, with Petter Solberg in fourth. Atkinson would see overheating issues drop him down to seventh, while Stohl would lose his intercom in stage 5 and went off the road in stage 6. Sordo would lose time during the incoming rain towards the end of the day, as his windshield wipers were not working properly.

Saturday would be a dominant performance by Gronholm, who would soar into the lead after luckily escaping a collision with a rock. Loeb would not be as lucky, hitting the same rock and suffering a puncture. Petter Solberg would end his rally early in stage 11, going off the road and rolling multiple times. Sordo would also crash out of the leg going over a jump. By the end of the day, Gronholm would have over a minute in hand over his championship rival. Atkinson, meanwhile, continued to suffer from gear issues and a power steering failure.

Sunday would see no changes between any of the drivers in the top eight; Gronholm cruised to a win, leaving Loeb in second. Hirvonen was uncontested in third, with Henning Solberg beating his brother and finishing fourth. Privateer entry Gigi Galli would score an impressive fifth despite a twenty second time penalty.

==== Classification ====
| Position | | No. | Driver | Co-driver | Entrant | Car | Time | Difference | Points |
| Event | Class | No. | Driver | Co-driver | Entrant | Car | Time | Difference | Points |
|---|---|---|---|---|---|---|---|---|---|
| 1 | 1 | 3 | (Finland) Marcus Grönholm | (Finland) Timo Rautiainen | BP Ford World Rally Team | Ford Focus RS WRC 06 | 2:52:50.3 | 0.0 | 10 |
| 2 | 2 | 1 | (France) Sebastien Loeb | (Monaco) Daniel Elena | Kronos Citroën World Rally Team | Citroën Xsara WRC | 2:53:57.0 | +1:06.7 | 8 |
| 3 | 3 | 4 | (Finland) Mikko Hirvonen | (Finland) Jarmo Lehtinen | BP Ford World Rally Team | Ford Focus RS WRC 06 | 2:54:24.8 | +1:34.5 | 6 |
| 4 | 4 | 8 | (Norway) Henning Solberg | (Norway) Cato Menkerud | OMV Peugeot Norway World Rally Team | Peugeot 307 WRC | 2:56:48.1 | +3:57.8 | 5 |
| 5 | 5 | 25 | (Italy) Gianluigi Galli | (Italy) Giovanni Bernacchini | Gianluigi Galli | Peugeot 307 WRC | 2:58:30.2 | +5:39.9 | 4 |
| 6 | 6 | 20 | (Finland) Janne Tuohino | (Finland) Mikko Markkula | PH Sport | Citroën Xsara WRC | 2:58:55.3 | +6:05.0 | 3 |
| 7 | 7 | 18 | (Finland) Jussi Välimäki | (Finland) Jarkko Kalliolepo | MMSP LTD | Mitsubishi Lancer WRC 05 | 2:59:45.7 | +6:55.4 | 2 |
| 8 | 8 | 16 | (Czech Republic) Jan Kopecký | (Czech Republic) Filip Schovánek | Czech RT Škoda Kopecký | Škoda Fabia WRC | 3:03:05.3 | +10:15.0 | 1 |
| 9 | 9 | 7 | (Austria) Manfred Stohl | (Austria) Ilka Minor | OMV Peugeot Norway World Rally Team | Peugeot 307 WRC | 3:06:18.3 | +13:28.0 | 0 |
| 10 | 10 | 9 | (United Kingdom) Matthew Wilson | (United Kingdom) Michael Orr | Stobart VK M-Sport Ford Rally Team | Ford Focus RS WRC 04 | 3:07:37.7 | +14:47.4 | 0 |
| 13 | 11 | 6 | (Australia) Chris Atkinson | (Australia) Glenn Macneall | Subaru World Rally Team | Impreza WRC 2006 | 3:11:50.9 | +19:00.6 | 0 |
| 14 | 12 | 10 | (Finland) Kosti Katajamäki | (Finland) Timo Alanne | Stobart VK M-Sport Ford Rally Team | Ford Focus RS WRC 04 | 3:13:56.1 | +21:05.8 | 0 |
| 17 | 13 | 21 | (Finland) Jari-Matti Latvala | (Finland) Asko Sairanen | Motoring Club | Toyota Corolla WRC | 3:18:24.3 | +25:34.0 | 0 |
| 58 | 14 | 94 | (Finland) Tapio Vuokila | (Finland) Jari Jaakola | Tapio Vuokila | Mitsubishi Lancer Evo VI | 4:00:18.5 | +1:07:28.2 | 0 |
| 60 | 15 | 79 | (Italy) Fabrizio de Sanctis | (Italy) Iuri Rosignoli | Fabrizio de Sanctis | Mitsubishi Lancer Evo VI | 4:02:21.5 | +1:09:31.2 | 0 |
| Retired SS21 | | 87 | (Finland) Pekka Savela | (Finland) Pasi Lahtinen | Pekka Savela | Mitsubishi Lancer Evo VIII | Mechanical | | 0 |
| Retired SS19 | | 27 | (Norway) Mads Østberg | (Norway) Ole Kristian Unnerud | Adapta AS | Subaru Impreza S9 WRC 03 | Gearbox | | 0 |
| Retired SS14 | | 2 | (Spain) Dani Sordo | (Spain) Marc Martí | Kronos Citroën World Rally Team | Citroën Xsara WRC | Accident | | 0 |
| Retired SS12 | | 82 | (Russia) Igor Sokolov | (Russia) Vasily Mirkotan | Syrus Rally Team | Mitsubishi Lancer Evo VI | Excluded | | 0 |
| Retired SS11 | | 5 | (Norway) Petter Solberg | (United Kingdom) Phil Mills | Subaru World Rally Team | Impreza WRC 2006 | Accident | | 0 |
| Retired SS11 | | 14 | (Spain) Xavier Pons | (Spain) Carlos del Barrio | Kronos Racing | Citroën Xsara WRC | Accident | | 0 |
| Retired SS11 | | 86 | (Finland) Mika Jokela | (Finland) Tapio Järvinen | Mika Jokela | Mitsubishi Lancer Evo VII | Mechanical | | 0 |
| Retired SS10 | | 15 | (Sweden) Daniel Carlsson | (Sweden) Tomas Thorszelius | MMSP LTD | Mitsubishi Lancer WRC 05 | Mechanical | | 0 |
| Retired SS10 | | 22 | (Finland) Juho Hänninen | (Finland) Marko Sallinen | MMSP LTD | Mitsubishi Lancer WRC 05 | Excluded | | 0 |
| Retired SS10 | | 26 | (Finland) Jukka Ketomäki | (Finland) Kai Risberg | Jukka Ketomäki | Skoda Octavia WRC | Mechanical | | 0 |
| Retired SS7 | | 19 | (Finland) Kristian Sohlberg | (Finland) Risto Pietiläinen | Red Devil Atolye Kazaz | Subaru Impreza S11 WRC 05 | Mechanical | | 0 |
| Retired SS2 | | 24 | (Norway) Thomas Schie | (Sweden) Göran Bergsten | Thomas Schie | Ford Focus RS WRC 04 | Accident | | 0 |

==== Special Stages ====
All dates and times are EEST (UTC+3).

| Day | Stage | Time | Name | Length (km) | Winner | Time | Rally leader |
|---|---|---|---|---|---|---|---|
| 1 (17/18 Aug) | SS1 | 20:00 | Killeri 1 | 2.00 | (France) Sébastien Loeb | 1:21.4 | (France) Sébastien Loeb |
| 1 (17/18 Aug) | SS2 | 09:21 | Lankamaa | 24.97 | (Finland) Marcus Grönholm | 11:59.7 | (Finland) Marcus Grönholm |
| 1 (17/18 Aug) | SS3 | 10:09 | Laukaa | 11.81 | (Finland) Marcus Grönholm | 5:40.8 | (Finland) Marcus Grönholm |
| 1 (17/18 Aug) | SS4 | 11:04 | Ruuhimaki | 7.57 | (Finland) Marcus Grönholm | 3:57.2 | (Finland) Marcus Grönholm |
| 1 (17/18 Aug) | SS5 | 13:08 | Vellipohja 1 | 36.38 | (France) Sébastien Loeb | 17:51.9 | (Finland) Marcus Grönholm |
| 1 (17/18 Aug) | SS6 | 14:17 | Mokkipera 1 | 12.60 | (France) Sébastien Loeb | 6:11.2 | (Finland) Marcus Grönholm |
| 1 (17/18 Aug) | SS7 | 16:36 | Vellipohja 2 | 36.38 | (Finland) Marcus Grönholm | 18:05.8 | (Finland) Marcus Grönholm |
| 1 (17/18 Aug) | SS8 | 17:45 | Mokkipera 2 | 12.60 | (France) Sébastien Loeb | 6:20.1 | (Finland) Marcus Grönholm |
| 1 (17/18 Aug) | SS9 | 20:00 | Killeri 2 | 2.00 | (Finland) Marcus Grönholm | 1:21.6 | (Finland) Marcus Grönholm |
| 2 (19 Aug) | SS10 | 07:06 | Vaheri | 19.90 | (Finland) Marcus Grönholm | 9:47.6 | (Finland) Marcus Grönholm |
| 2 (19 Aug) | SS11 | 08:20 | Ouninpohja Lansi 1 | 13.97 | (France) Sébastien Loeb | 6:33.0 | (Finland) Marcus Grönholm |
| 2 (19 Aug) | SS12 | 08:43 | Ouninpohja Ita 1 | 16.54 | (Finland) Marcus Grönholm | 7:51.7 | (Finland) Marcus Grönholm |
| 2 (19 Aug) | SS13 | 11:44 | Urria | 10.00 | (Finland) Marcus Grönholm | 4:40.8 | (Finland) Marcus Grönholm |
| 2 (19 Aug) | SS14 | 13:07 | Ouninpohja Lansi 2 | 13.97 | (Finland) Marcus Grönholm | 6:30.7 | (Finland) Marcus Grönholm |
| 2 (19 Aug) | SS15 | 13:30 | Ouninpohja Ita 2 | 16.54 | (Finland) Marcus Grönholm | 7:51.8 | (Finland) Marcus Grönholm |
| 2 (19 Aug) | SS16 | 16:48 | Moksi-Leustu | 40.95 | (Finland) Marcus Grönholm | 20:25.6 | (Finland) Marcus Grönholm |
| 2 (19 Aug) | SS17 | 18:04 | Himos | 12.97 | (Finland) Marcus Grönholm | 7:09.1 | (Finland) Marcus Grönholm |
| 3 (20 Aug) | SS18 | 09:14 | Kuohu 1 | 7.80 | (Finland) Mikko Hirvonen | 3:42.4 | (Finland) Marcus Grönholm |
| 3 (20 Aug) | SS19 | 10:27 | Jukojarvi 1 | 22.30 | (Finland) Mikko Hirvonen | 10:46.6 | (Finland) Marcus Grönholm |
| 3 (20 Aug) | SS20 | 11:45 | Kuohu 2 | 7.80 | (Finland) Mikko Hirvonen | 3:42.6 | (Finland) Marcus Grönholm |
| 3 (20 Aug) | SS21 | 12:58 | Jukojarvi 2 | 22.30 | (Finland) Mikko Hirvonen | 10:39.5 | (Finland) Marcus Grönholm |

==== Championship Standings ====
| Pos. | Drivers' Championship | | | Manufacturers' Championship | | |
| Pos. | Move | Driver | Points | Move | Manufacturer | Points |
|---|---|---|---|---|---|---|
| 1 | | (France) Sébastien Loeb | 92 | | (Belgium) Kronos Citroën World Rally Team | 122 |
| 2 | | (Finland) Marcus Gronholm | 61 | | (United Kingdom) BP Ford World Rally Team | 107 |
| 3 | | (Spain) Dani Sordo | 41 | | (Japan) Subaru World Rally Team | 65 |
| 4 | 1 | (Finland) Mikko Hirvonen | 27 | | OMV Peugeot Norway World Rally Team | 50 |
| 5 | 1 | (Austria) Manfred Stohl | 24 | 1 | (United Kingdom) Stobart VK M-Sport Ford Rally Team | 24 |

=== Junior WRC ===
==== Classification ====
| Position | | No. | Driver | Co-driver | Entrant | Car | Time | Difference | Points |
| Event | Class | No. | Driver | Co-driver | Entrant | Car | Time | Difference | Points |
|---|---|---|---|---|---|---|---|---|---|
| 15 | 1 | 48 | (United Kingdom) Guy Wilks | (United Kingdom) Phil Pugh | Suzuki Sport Europe | Suzuki Swift 1600 | 3:16:05.7 | 0.0 | 10 |
| 18 | 2 | 35 | (Sweden) Per-Gunnar Andersson | (Sweden) Jonas Andersson | Suzuki Sport Europe | Suzuki Swift 1600 | 3:18:43.2 | +2:37.5 | 8 |
| 21 | 3 | 59 | (Finland) Matti Rantanen | (Finland) Jan Lönegren | Motor Stars | Honda Civic Type-R | 3:24:51.6 | +8:45.9 | 6 |
| 22 | 4 | 42 | (France) Julien Pressac | (France) Jack Boyere | PH Sport | Citroën C2 S1600 | 3:25:30.1 | +9:24.4 | 5 |
| 25 | 5 | 45 | (Slovakia) Jozef Béreš | (Czech Republic) Petr Starý | Styllex Tuning Motorsport | Suzuki Ignis 1600 | 3:29:25.5 | +13:19.8 | 4 |
| 28 | 6 | 43 | (Estonia) Jaan Mölder | (Germany) Katrin Becker | JM Engineering | Suzuki Ignis 1600 | 3:30:54.2 | +14:48.5 | 3 |
| 34 | 7 | 41 | (Sweden) Patrik Sandell | (Sweden) Emil Axelsson | Renault Sport | Renault Clio 1600 | 3:32:46.5 | +16:40.8 | 2 |
| 35 | 8 | 49 | (Czech Republic) Martin Prokop | (Czech Republic) Jan Tománek | Jipocar Czech National Team | Citroën C2 S1600 | 3:34:59.9 | +18:54.2 | 1 |
| 37 | 9 | 53 | (United Kingdom) Barry Clark | (United Kingdom) Scott Martin | Stobart VK M-Sport Ford Rally Team | Ford Fiesta ST | 3:36:38.9 | +20:33.2 | 0 |
| 39 | 10 | 46 | (Italy) Andrea Cortinovis | (Italy) Flavio Zanella | Power Car Team | Renault Clio RS | 3:42:23.5 | +26:17.8 | 0 |
| 43 | 11 | 39 | (Zimbabwe) Conrad Rautenbach | (United Kingdom) David Senior | Barroso Sport | Renault Clio 1600 | 3:44:52.1 | +28:46.4 | 0 |
| 48 | 12 | 37 | (Czech Republic) Pavel Valoušek | (Czech Republic) Zdeněk Hrůza | Suzuki Sport Europe | Suzuki Swift 1600 | 3:49:49.3 | +33:43.6 | 0 |
| 50 | 13 | 50 | (Finland) Kalle Pinomäki | (Finland) Jani Laaksonen | Clio Junior Team | Renault Clio 1600 | 3:51:28.9 | +35:23.2 | 0 |
| Retired SS21 | | 55 | (France) Fabio Fiandino | (France) Sabrina de Castelli | PH Sport | Citroën C2 R2 | Mechanical | | 0 |
| Retired SS15 | | 32 | (United Kingdom) Kris Meeke | (United Kingdom) Glenn Patterson | PH Sport | Citroën C2 S1600 | Engine | | 0 |
| Retired SS10 | | 33 | (Estonia) Urmo Aava | (Estonia) Kuldar Sikk | Suzuki Sport Europe | Suzuki Swift 1600 | Excluded | | 0 |
| Retired SS10 | | 44 | (Poland) Michał Kościuszko | (Czech Republic) Jaroslaw Baran | Suzuki Sport Europe | Suzuki Swift 1600 | Accident | | 0 |
| Retired SS10 | | 47 | (Italy) Filippo Bordignon | (Italy) James Bardini | Hawk Racing Club | Opel Astra OPC | Excluded | | 0 |

==== Championship Standings ====
| Pos. | Drivers' Championship | | |
| Pos. | Move | Driver | Points |
|---|---|---|---|
| 1 | 1 | (Sweden) Per-Gunnar Andersson | 29 |
| 2 | 1 | (Sweden) Patrik Sandell | 28 |
| 3 | 6 | (United Kingdom) Guy Wilks | 21 |
| 4 | 1 | (Estonia) Urmo Aava | 20 |
| 5 | 1 | (Zimbabwe) Conrad Rautenbach | 17 |
