= Phil Pugh =

Wales international rugby union player

- Full name: Phillip Pugh
- Born: 8 October 1959 (age 67) Seven Sisters, Wales

Rugby union career
- Position: Flanker
International career
Years	Team	Apps	(Points)
1989	Wales	1	(0)

Phillip Pugh (born 8 October 1959) is a Welsh former rugby union international.

A native of Seven Sisters in Neath Port Talbot, Pugh was a flanker and played his senior rugby for Neath RFC. He was a physical player, regarded as an enforcer, whose performance for Neath against the touring All Blacks in 1989 earned him a maiden Wales call up at the age of 30 for the one-off Test in Cardiff. This remained his only Wales cap.

Pugh, previously a miner, works as a salesman for the agricultural industry.

== See also ==
- List of Wales national rugby union players
