= BFGoodrich =

Brand of tires produced and sold by Michelin

- Product type: Tires
- Current owner: Michelin
- Produced by: Michelin
- Country: United States
- Introduced: 1870; 156 years ago
- Markets: Worldwide
- Previous owners: Goodrich Corporation
- Website: www.bfgoodrich.com

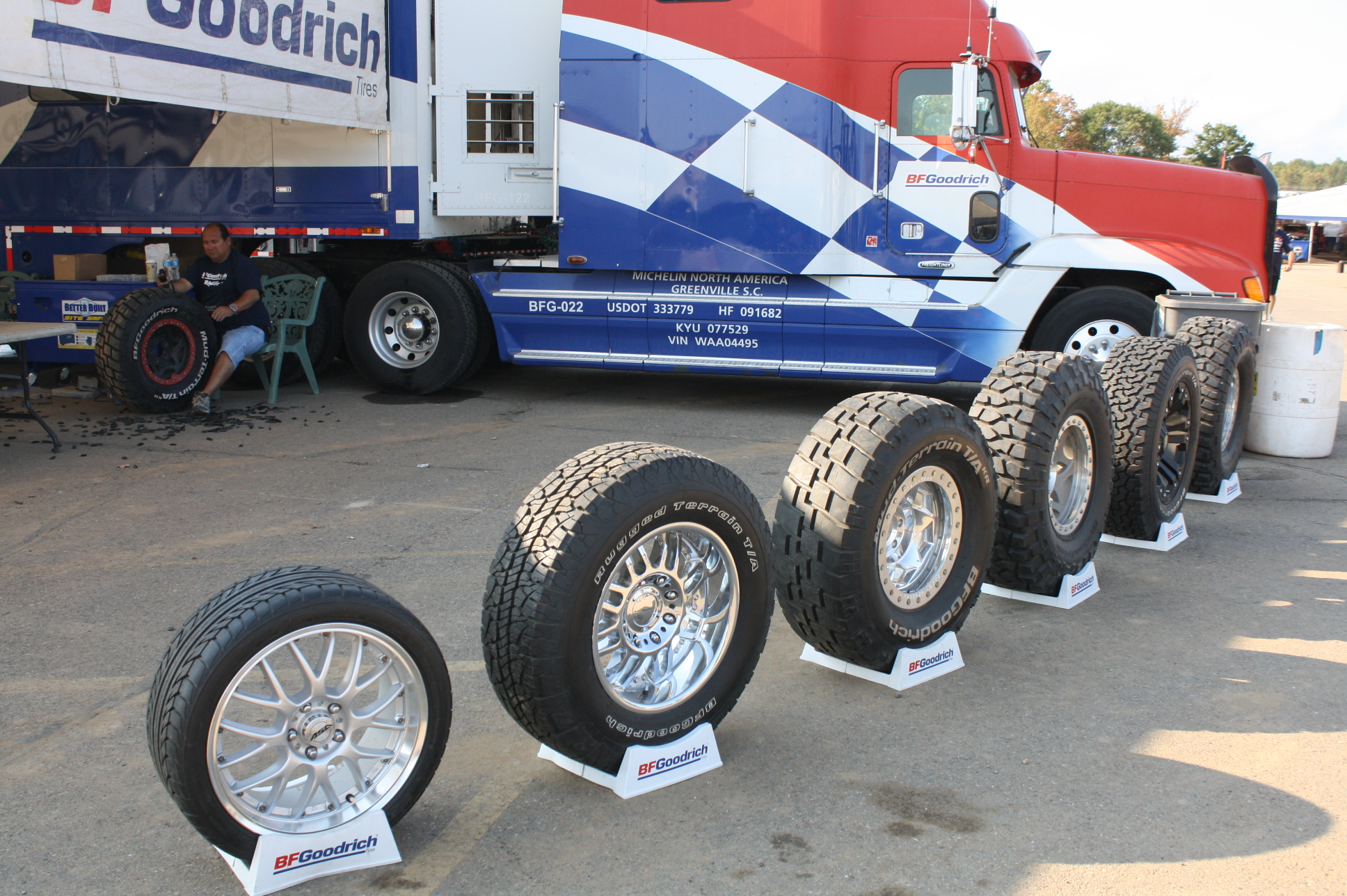
Series of BFGoodrich off-road tires

BFGoodrich is an American tire brand. Originally part of the industrial conglomerate Goodrich Corporation, it was acquired in 1990 (along with Uniroyal, then The Uniroyal Goodrich Tire Company) by the French tire maker Michelin. BFGoodrich was the first American tire manufacturer to make radial tires. It made tires for the then-new Winton car from Winton Motor Carriage Company.

BFGoodrich tires have been fitted to several noteworthy historical vehicles:

- In 1903 the first car to cross the United States was fitted with B.F. Goodrich tires.
- In 1927 Charles Lindbergh's airplane, the Spirit of St. Louis, which made the first successful solo non-stop flight across the Atlantic, was fitted with B.F. Goodrich tires.
- The Space Shuttle Columbia's landing gear was fitted with BFGoodrich tires.

BFGoodrich has been involved in several Baja California Competitions and enjoyed success with 28 overall victories at the Baja 1000 and 13 times winner of the Paris–Dakar Rally.

== History ==
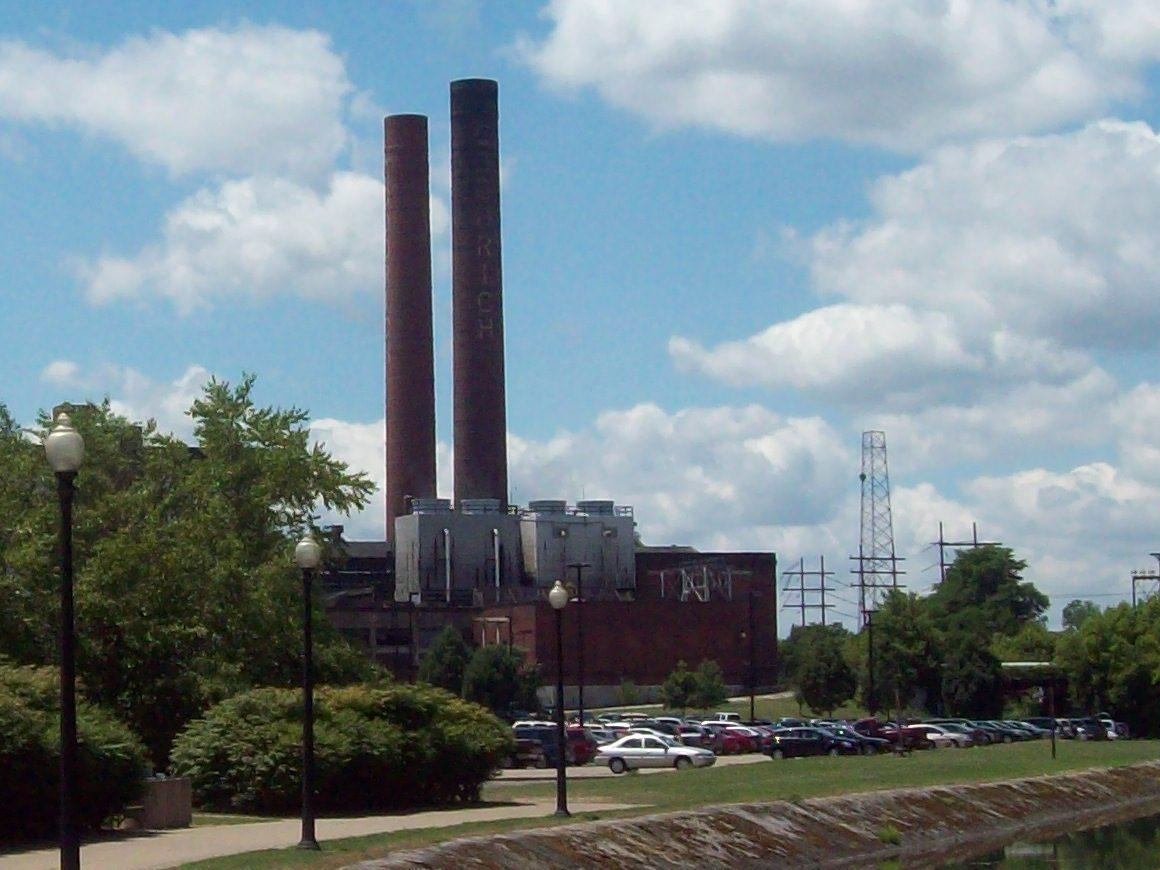
The former BFGoodrich smoke stacks at the old tire plant, and headquarters in Akron, Ohio

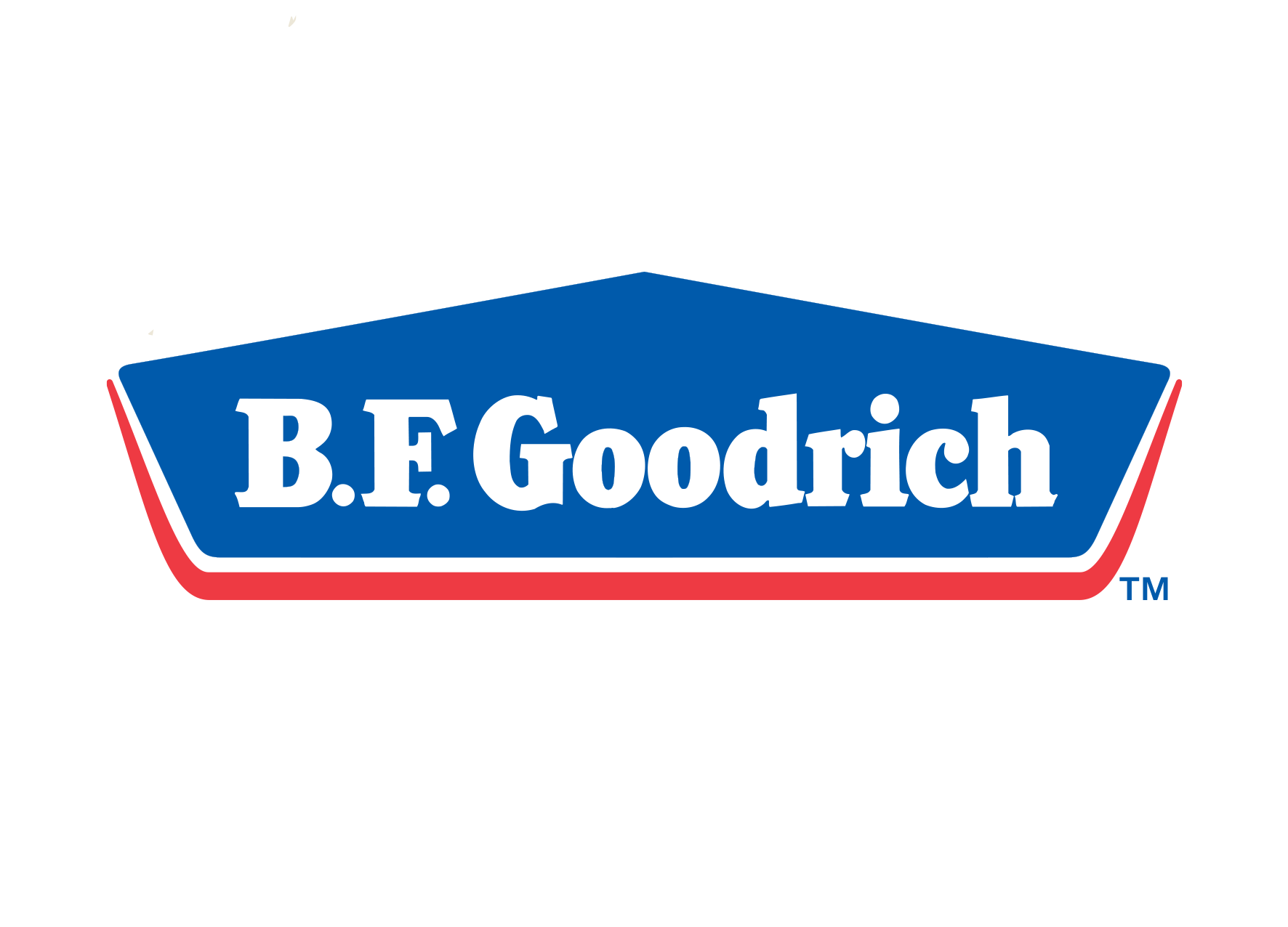
Logotype used at mid-century, but still used on Silvertown legacy bias-ply tire product line.

Founded by Dr. Benjamin Franklin Goodrich in 1870, the B.F. Goodrich Company, later known as BFGoodrich, was among the first rubber tire manufacturers to be located west of the Appalachian mountain range. In the previous year, Goodrich had purchased the Hudson River Rubber Company. Based in Akron, Ohio, the BFGoodrich Company began as a manufacturer of rubberized hoses, which were sold mostly as firehoses. The company also produced rubberized belts, similar to those used on modern vehicles as serpentine belts (fan belt). As the company grew, it began to manufacture pneumatic bicycle tires, eventually leading to the production of pneumatic automobile tires in 1896, making BFGoodrich the first company in the United States to manufacture this type of tire.

BFGoodrich was not the only tire manufacturer in the United States at the turn of the 20th century. Among its competitors were Goodyear, Firestone, General and Uniroyal. Due to extensive research and scientific methods, such as tire wear evaluation and longevity testing, BFGoodrich was at the leading edge of the industry. Ford Motor Company, then owned by Henry Ford, chose BFGoodrich tires to be fitted in the new Model A Ford in 1903. That same year, the Model A, equipped with the tires, became the first car to cross the United States from east to west. This event made BFGoodrich a household name. The Goodrich Corporation, formerly called B.F. Goodrich Company, stopped making tires in 1988 and sold the business and the B.F. Goodrich name to Michelin. Although Michelin purchased the rights and many of the factories of B.F. Goodrich within the United States, the Goodrich factories continued tire production under the parent company, Michelin. As of 2023 there are only two (2) of the B.F. Goodrich factories in operations producing tires, while still working under the original B.F. Goodrich name. These last two factory locations are Tuscaloosa, Alabama and Woodburn, Indiana.

== Innovation ==
Aside from being the first company in the United States to manufacture pneumatic automobile tires, BFGoodrich is also credited for introducing the rubber-wound golf ball, the first pressurized space suit and the use of synthetic rubber. Although significant, these innovations are not as well known as the company’s contributions to the tire industry.

In 1947, BFGoodrich developed the first tubeless tire in the United States. The tubeless tire eliminate the need for an inner tube, which improves performance and safety, as well as enhanced comfort for the car's occupants.

BFGoodrich produced the first radial tires in the United States in 1965. This innovation made tires even safer as radial tires have longer tread life and permit better absorption of road bumps. The company patented an early sort of run-flat tire two years later, in 1967. This technology enables the vehicle to continue to be driven in emergencies by avoiding that the tire becomes flat instantly.

BF Goodrich also developed the PF flyer shoe in 1933.

== Aeronautics ==
In 1909, BFGoodrich tires were fitted on a Curtiss airplane, thus marking BFGoodrich's entry in the aviation tire market. In this particular event, the plane, fitted with BFGoodrich tires, set a speed record of 75 kilometers per hour in Reims at the first international air race. BFGoodrich tires were also fitted to Charles Lindbergh’s plane, Spirit of St. Louis, when he completed the first solo non-stop transatlantic flight.

In 1934, BFGoodrich produced a prototype for a pressure suit to be worn by airplane pilot Wiley Post at high altitudes. This first prototype was made mostly of rubber, with the exception being the metal helmet and waist strap. The prototype suit was pressurized in an initial test, but it did not hold pressure as it was expected to. With improvements to the concept, a second prototype was made, using the same helmet, which successfully maintained pressurization. The second suit was successful, at least in holding pressure. The suit had shrunk around Post's body and was removed by cutting the suit apart. One year later, in 1935, another prototype was produced and is said to be the first practical pressure suit in the United States. Piloting his plane, the “Winnie Mae”, Post was able to fly to an altitude of approximately 50,000 feet, where he discovered the jet stream, paving the way for modern flight procedures. From this point forward, the suit created by BFGoodrich served as pattern for modern pressurized space suits.

In 1946, B. F. Goodrich purchased the airplane, wheel, and brake division of Hayes Industries.

== Racing Heritage ==
BFGoodrich is also known for their performance and racing developments and achievements. Its roots in racing can be traced as far back as 1914, when BFGoodrich tires were used by the winning car of the Indianapolis 500. This was just the beginning of victories in several competitions including the Baja 1000, Paris-Dakar Rally, World Rally Championships and many other prestigious racing competitions.

BFGoodrich has been active in competitive off-road racing in the United States since 1973, and entered the Dakar Rally in 1993. BFGoodrich has served as an official sponsor and tire partner for the Dakar Rally since 2002, supplying tires and support services to competitors.

== Offroad ==
BFGoodrich developed and markets its flagship All-Terrain T/A and Mud-Terrain T/A tires. The tires have a unique tread pattern and raised white letters on the tire sidewall, their main application is pickup trucks and body-on-frame SUVs. BFG also supplies custom spec tires for Class1, Class 10 and Unlimited Spec Desert car racing.

== In popular culture ==
In 1976 BFGoodrich sponsored a short documentary film, Free Wheelin', about vanning, the practice of customizing vans. The film was directed by Bill Buckley and Mel Horace and written by Brock Yates. Cinecraft Productions provided the location production crew and post-production services. Footage for the documentary was shot at the National Street Van July 1976 “4th Annual "National Truck-In" get together in Bowling Green, Kentucky. The movie featured interviews with participants, as well as plugs for BFGoodrich tires and a BFGoodrich "project van," an automobile outfitted with the latest van technology. The film had a full length of approximately 21 minutes but was edited to other lengths so that it could play as either a short or a trailer in movie theaters. In 2023 the film was restored by the Hagley Museum and Library, which had received a grant from the National Film Preservation Foundation for film preservation, and is currently held in its archives.
