= 2006 Rally d'Italia Sardegna =

Rallying motorsport event

2006 Rally d'Italia Sardegna 3° Rally d'Italia Sardegna
Round 7 of the 2006 World Rally Championship
| ← Previous event | Next event → |
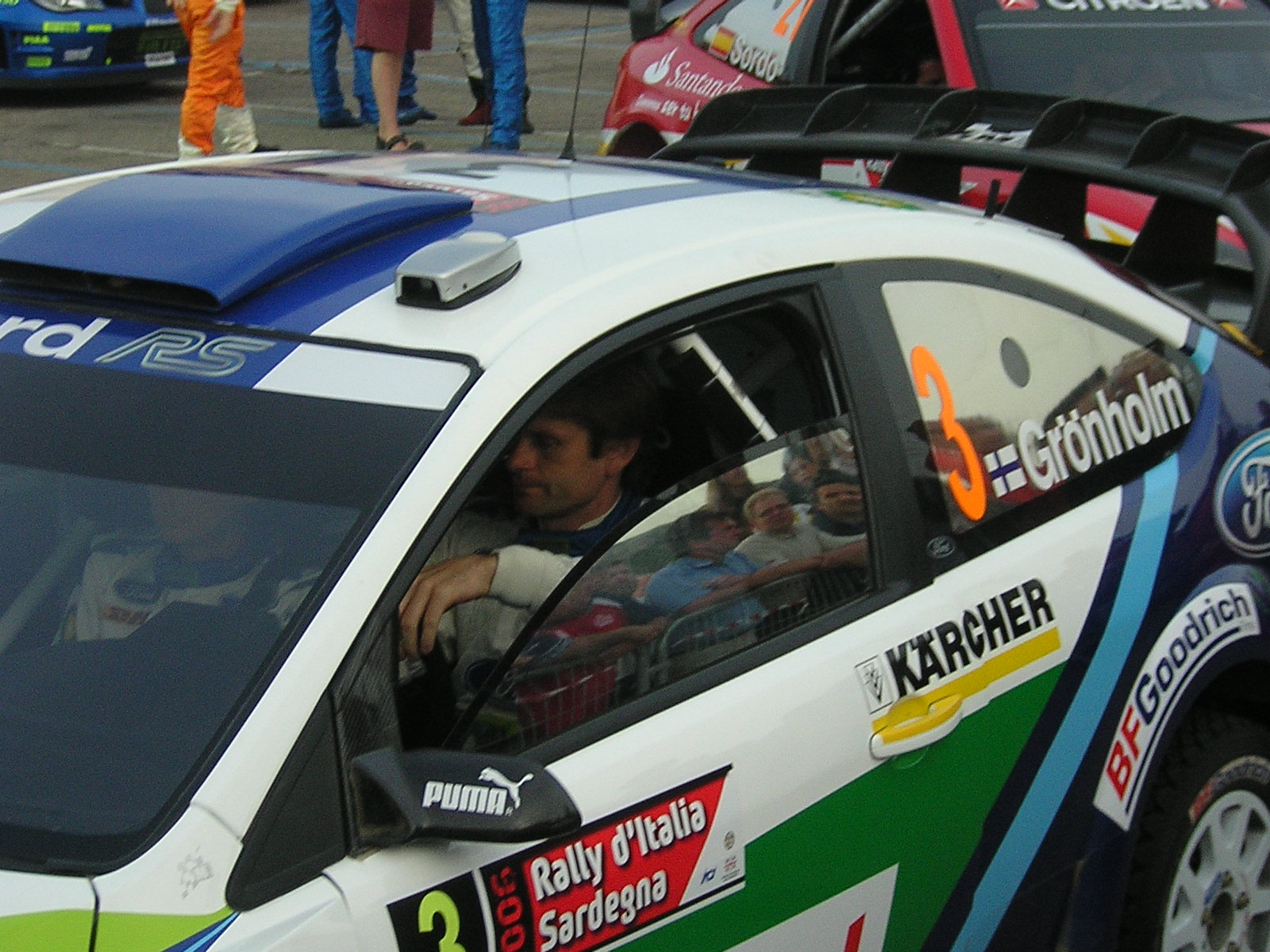
- Marcus Grönholm during the rally.
- Dates run: May 19 – 21 2006
- Stages: 18
- Stage surface: Gravel

Statistics
- Crews: 79 at start, 66 at finish

Overall results
- Overall winner: (France) Sébastien Loeb (Belgium) Kronos Total Citroën World Rally Team

The 3° Rally d'Italia Sardegna, the seventh round of the 2006 World Rally Championship season, took place between May 19 and May 21, 2006.

== Results ==
| Pos. | Driver | Co-driver | Car | Time | Difference | Points |
WRC
| 1 | (France) Sébastien Loeb | (Monaco) Daniel Elena | Citroën Xsara WRC | 3:54:18.9 | 0.0 | 10 |
| 2 | (Finland) Mikko Hirvonen | (Finland) Jarmo Lehtinen | Ford Focus RS WRC 06 | 3:57:00.3 | 2:41.4 | 8 |
| 3 | (Spain) Daniel Sordo | (Spain) Marc Marti | Citroën Xsara WRC | 3:57:46.6 | 3:27.7 | 6 |
| 4 | (Spain) Xavier Pons | (Spain) Carlos Del Barrio | Citroën Xsara WRC | 3:59:47.2 | 5:28.3 | 5 |
| 5 | (Finland) Jussi Välimäki | (Finland) Jarkko Kalliolepo | Mitsubishi Lancer WRC | 4:01:27.7 | 7:08.8 | 4 |
| 6 | (Finland) Kristian Sohlberg | (Finland) Tomi Tuominen | Subaru Impreza WRC | 4:01:55.8 | 7:36.9 | 3 |
| 7 | (Austria) Manfred Stohl | (Austria) Ilka Minor | Peugeot 307 WRC | 4:02:37.3 | 8:18.4 | 2 |
| 8 | (Belgium) François Duval | (France) Patrick Pivato | Škoda Fabia WRC | 4:04:04.7 | 9:45.8 | 1 |
JWRC
| 1 | (Sweden) Patrik Sandell | (Sweden) Emil Axelsson | Renault Clio Super 1600 | 4:26:25.2 | 0.0 | 10 |
| 2 | (Zimbabwe) Conrad Rautenbach | (United Kingdom) David Senior | Renault Clio Super 1600 | 4:31:33.6 | 5:08.4 | 8 |
| 3 | (Estonia) Urmo Aava | (Estonia) Kuldar Sikk | Suzuki Swift Super 1600 | 4:32:02.0 | 5:36.8 | 6 |
| 4 | (Sweden) Per-Gunnar Andersson | (Sweden) Jonas Andersson | Suzuki Swift Super 1600 | 4:34:09.2 | 7:44.0 | 5 |
| 5 | (Germany) Aaron Burkart | (Germany) Tanja Geilhausen | Citroën C2 Super 1600 | 4:36:12.2 | 9:47.0 | 4 |
| 6 | (Italy) Luca Betti | (Italy) Piercarlo Capolongo | Renault Clio Super 1600 | 4:36:39.0 | 10:13.8 | 3 |
| 7 | (France) Julien Pressac | (France) Gilles De Turkheim | Citroën C2 Super 1600 | 4:37:40.3 | 11:15.1 | 2 |
| 8 | (United Kingdom) Guy Wilks | (United Kingdom) Phil Pugh | Suzuki Swift Super 1600 | 4:42:36.6 | 16:11.4 | 1 |

== Special Stages ==
All dates and times are CEST (UTC+2).

| Day | Stage | Time | Name | Length (km) | Winner | Time | Rally leader |
|---|---|---|---|---|---|---|---|
| 1 (19 MAY) | SS1 | 08:46 | Terranova 1 | 24.1 | (Finland) Marcus Grönholm | 17:06.9 | (Finland) Marcus Grönholm |
| 1 (19 MAY) | SS2 | 09:58 | Onani 1 | 18.46 | (Finland) Marcus Grönholm | 12:46.0 | (Finland) Marcus Grönholm |
| 1 (19 MAY) | SS3 | 11:10 | Siniscola 1 | 22.25 | (Finland) Marcus Grönholm | 17:29.3 | (Finland) Marcus Grönholm |
| 1 (19 MAY) | SS4 | 14:36 | Terranova 2 | 24.1 | (France) Sébastien Loeb | 16:32.4 | (Finland) Marcus Grönholm |
| 1 (19 MAY) | SS5 | 15:48 | Onani 2 | 18.46 | (France) Sébastien Loeb | 12:27.4 | (Finland) Marcus Grönholm |
| 1 (19 MAY) | SS6 | 17:00 | Siniscola 2 | 22.25 | (Finland) Marcus Grönholm | 17:12.8 | (Finland) Marcus Grönholm |
| 2 (MAY 20) | SS7 | 09:30 | Loelle 1 | 25.2 | (Finland) Marcus Grönholm | 15:30.8 | (Finland) Marcus Grönholm |
| 2 (MAY 20) | SS8 | 10:28 | Monte Lerno 1 | 31.2 | (France) Sébastien Loeb | 20:32.8 | (France) Sébastien Loeb |
| 2 (MAY 20) | SS9 | 11:13 | Su Filigosu 1 | 12.27 | (France) Sébastien Loeb | 8:17.8 | (France) Sébastien Loeb |
| 2 (MAY 20) | SS10 | 14:40 | Loelle 2 | 25.2 | (Norway) Petter Solberg | 15:22.3 | (France) Sébastien Loeb |
| 2 (MAY 20) | SS11 | 15:38 | Monte Lerno 2 | 31.2 | (France) Sébastien Loeb | 20:12.7 | (France) Sébastien Loeb |
| 2 (MAY 20) | SS12 | 16:23 | Su Filigosu 2 | 12.27 | (France) Sébastien Loeb | 8:06.1 | (France) Sébastien Loeb |
| 3 (MAY 21) | SS13 | 07:49 | S. Giacomo 1 | 13.46 | (Norway) Petter Solberg | 10:09.3 | (France) Sébastien Loeb |
| 3 (MAY 21) | SS14 | 08:40 | La Prugnola 1 | 9.59 | (Australia) Chris Atkinson | 4:56.0 | (France) Sébastien Loeb |
| 3 (MAY 21) | SS15 | 09:17 | Campovaglio 1 | 15.92 | (France) Sébastien Loeb | 10:53.4 | (France) Sébastien Loeb |
| 3 (MAY 21) | SS16 | 10:48 | La Prugnola 2 | 13.46 | (Norway) Petter Solberg | 4:50.5 | (France) Sébastien Loeb |
| 3 (MAY 21) | SS17 | 11:25 | Campovaglio 2 | 15.92 | (France) Sébastien Loeb | 10:40.1 | (France) Sébastien Loeb |
| 3 (MAY 21) | SS18 | 12:32 | S. Giacomo 2 | 13.46 | (Czech Republic) Jan Kopecky | 10:09.2 | (France) Sébastien Loeb |
