= Caillac =

- Commune
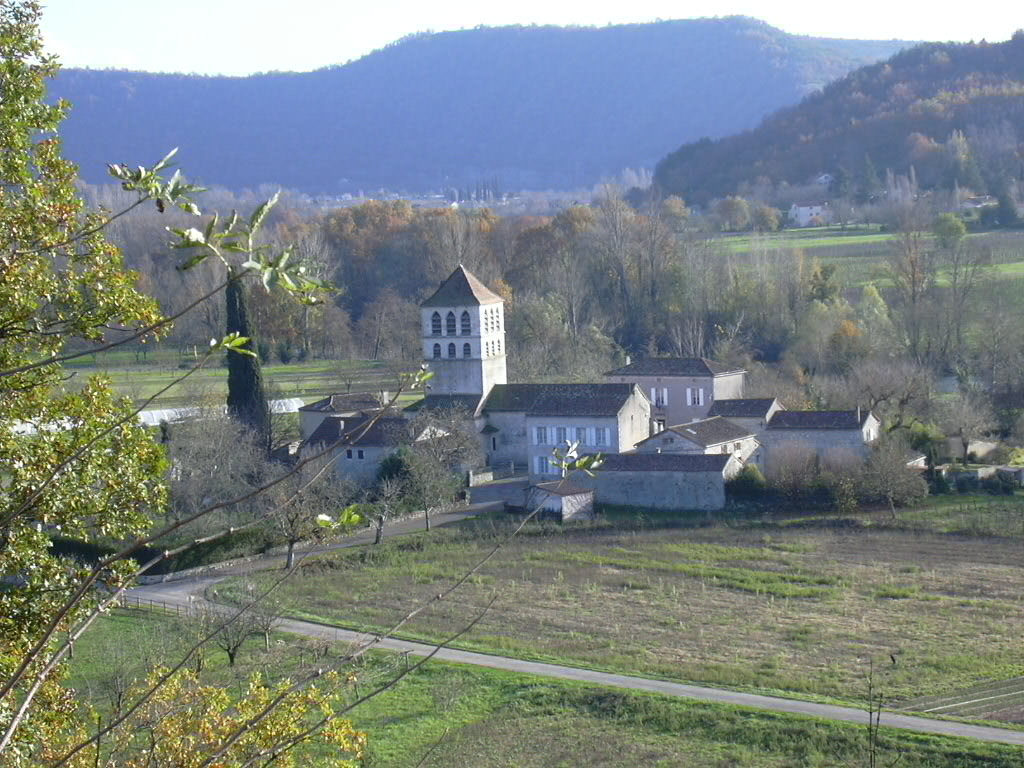
- The church in Caillac
- Location of Caillac
- Location within France Location within Occitanie
- Coordinates: 44°17′24″N 1°12′47″E
- Country: France
- Region: Occitania
- Department: Lot
- Arrondissement: Cahors
- Canton: Luzech
- Intercommunality: CA Grand Cahors

Government
  - Mayor (2020–2026): José Tillou
- Area^{1}: 7.44 km^{2} (2.87 sq mi)
- Elevation: 161 m (528 ft)
- Highest elevation: 271 m (889 ft)
- Lowest elevation: 100 m (330 ft)
- Population (2023): 581
  - Density: 78.1/km^{2} (202/sq mi)
- Time zone: UTC+01:00 (CET)
  - Summer (DST): UTC+02:00 (CEST)
- INSEE/Postal code: 46044 /46140
- ^{1} French Land Register data, which excludes lakes, ponds, glaciers > 1 km^{2} (0.386 sq mi or 247 acres) and river estuaries.

Caillac (French pronunciation: [kajak]; Occitan: Calhac) is a commune in the Lot department in south-western France.

== Sites and monuments ==
- The Romanesque church of Saint-Pierre-et-Saint-Paul de Caillac was classified as a monument historique in 1979
- Château Lagrézette, built during the Renaissance, stands in a vineyard and is the property of a famous French industrialist. It was classified as a monument historique in 1982.
- Since 2006, an artificial lake has been built in the town centre to develop fishing as a leisure activity.
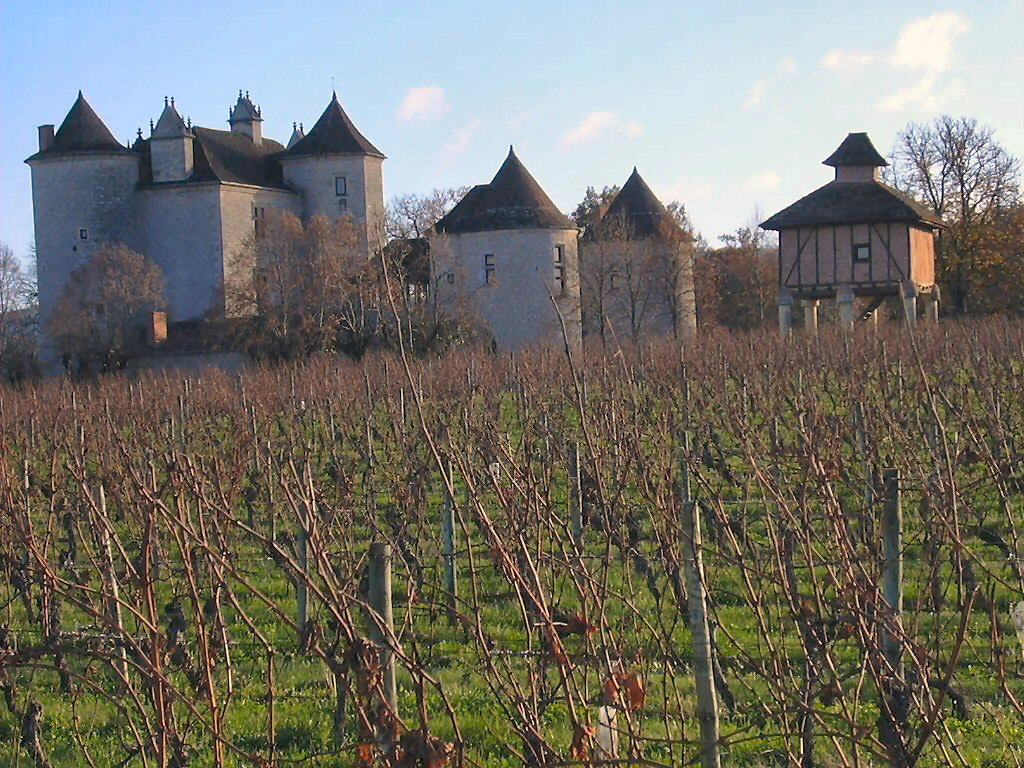
View of the Château Lagrezette.

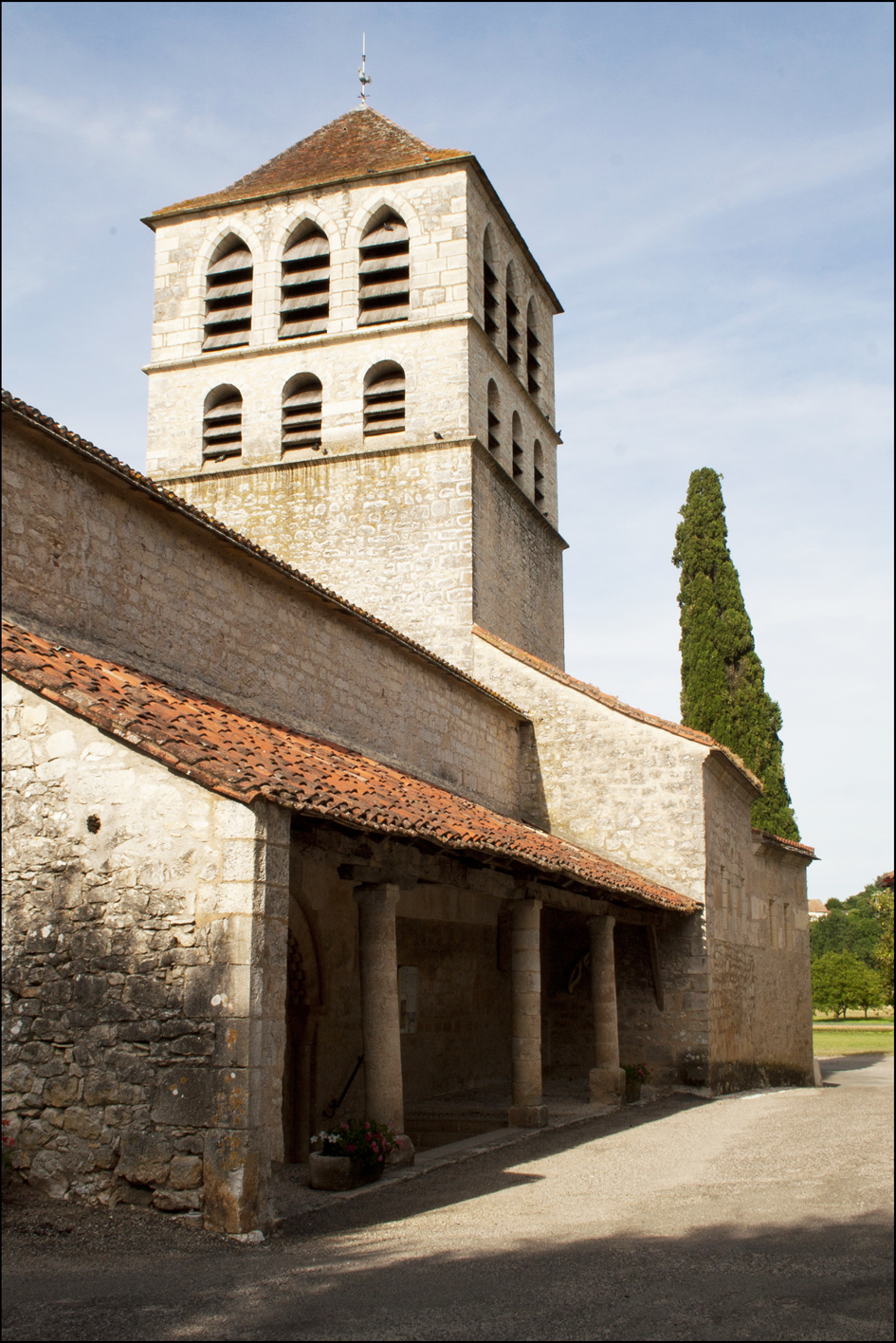
Saint-Pierre-et-Saint-Paul church.

== Personalities linked to the commune ==
- General Joachim Ambert (1804-1890), born in Château Lagrézette on 8 February 1804.
- Alain-Dominique Perrin, businessman, owner of Château Lagrézette since 1980.
- Tony Blair, while prime minister of the UK, stayed in Château Lagrézette in 2002.
- André Bergeron (1922-2014), secretary of Force Ouvrière.

== See also ==
- Communes of the Lot department
