= Centre national de la photographie =

Coordinates: 48.875°N 2.303°E

The Centre national de la photographie is a French association managed by the Ministry of Culture, dedicated to photography and contemporary art.

In 2004 it merged with the "Patrimoine photographique" to create the association of the Galerie nationale du Jeu de Paume, funded by the Ministry of Culture and directed by Alain-Dominique Perrin.

Its archives are preserved and can be consulted at the Archives nationales.
