= Château Lagrézette =

Fortified house in Lot, Occitania, France

Coordinates: 44.4878°N 1.3639°E

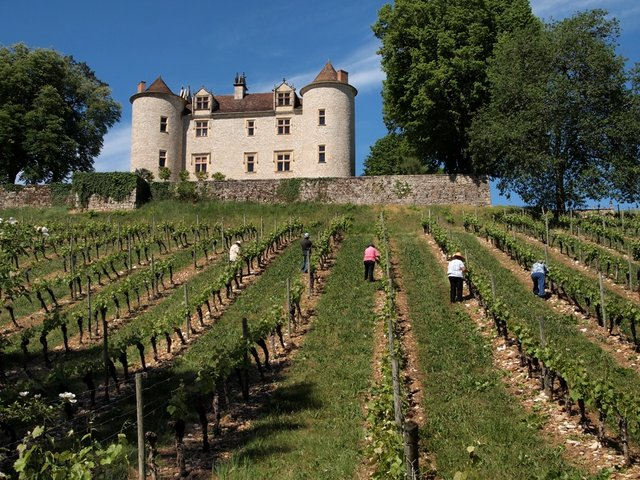
Château Lagrézette, May 2011

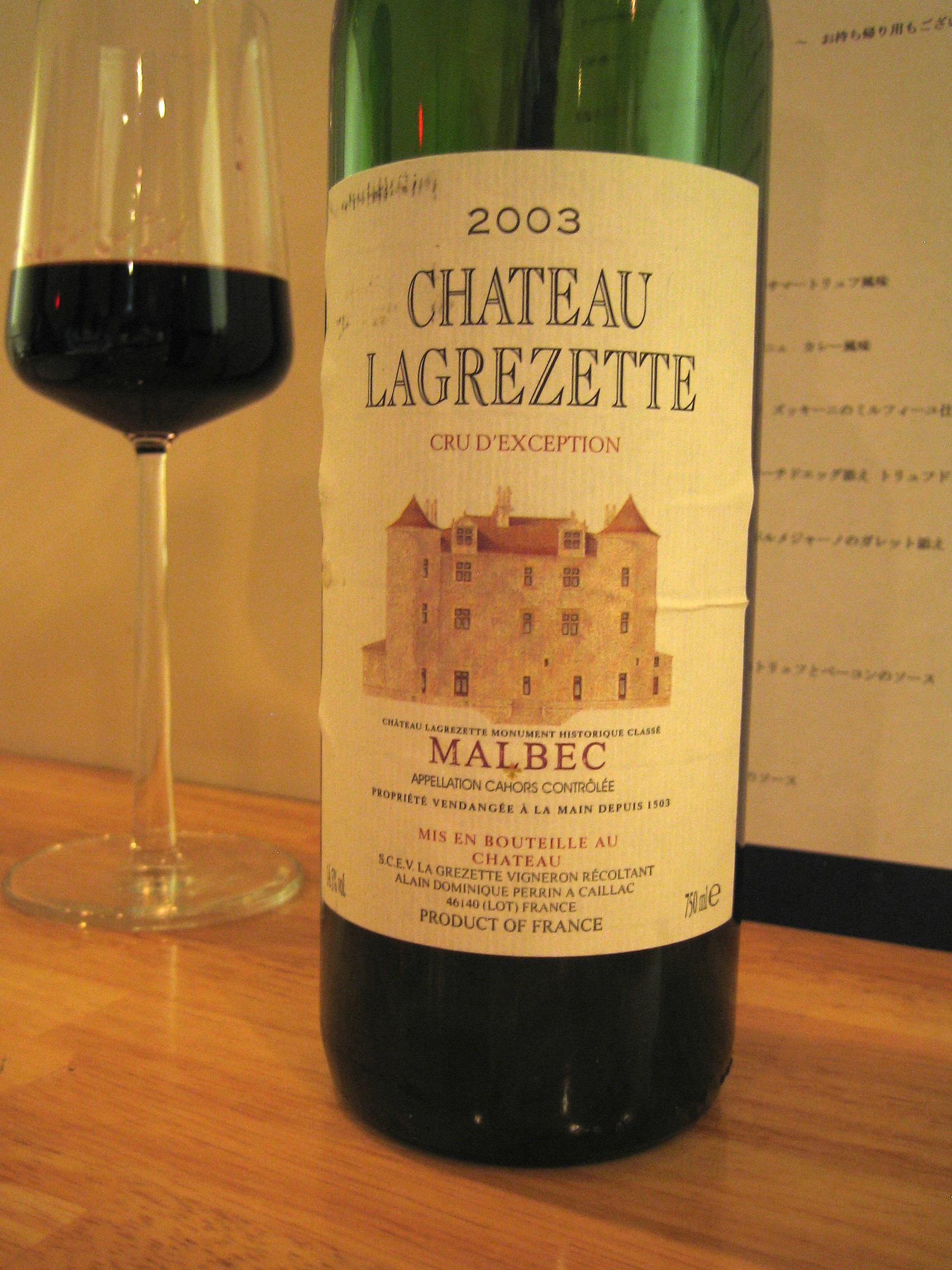
Château Lagrézette cru d’exception 2003

Château Lagrézette (or Château de La Grézette) is an ancient fortified house near the river Lot in Caillac in the Lot department in south-western France.

== Origins ==
The site was the location of a twelfth-century fortified house, and the local vineyard was held in high regard as early as the seventh century. The château itself was built by Pierre de Massault in the fifteenth century and was owned by many eminent families over the centuries, but fell into disrepair in recent years.

== Restoration ==
The ruin was purchased in 1980 by Alain-Dominique Perrin, who was president of Cartier SA from 1975 to 1988. It was listed as a historical monument (Monument historique) in the Base Mérimée on 21 October 1982 and the buildings have been completely restored. The main building is flanked by two round towers and the architectural style blends traditional mediaeval sturdy design with more elegant Renaissance decoration.

Perrin has also brought the vineyard, which is the oldest vineyard in southwest France, back into production, working with oenologist and consultant Michel Rolland and soil microbiologist Claude Bourguignon to produce wine from the Malbec grape variety. The Château Lagrézette wine Le Pigeonnier (100% Malbec) was voted as one of the best 100 wines by Wine Spectator magazine in 2005.

The château has entertained a number of eminent visitors in recent years. In 1984 Perrin founded the Fondation Cartier pour l'Art Contemporain, and guests have included the sculptor César Baldaccini, painters Robert Combas and Jean-Charles Blais, photographer Herb Ritts, as well as Elton John, Helmut Newton, Lou Reed, Dennis Hopper, Wim Wenders and David Lynch. Tony Blair, British Prime Minister at the time, stayed at the château in 2002.

== See also ==
- List of castles in France
- List of châteaux in the Midi-Pyrénées
