= Peugeot 905 =

Race car by Peugeot

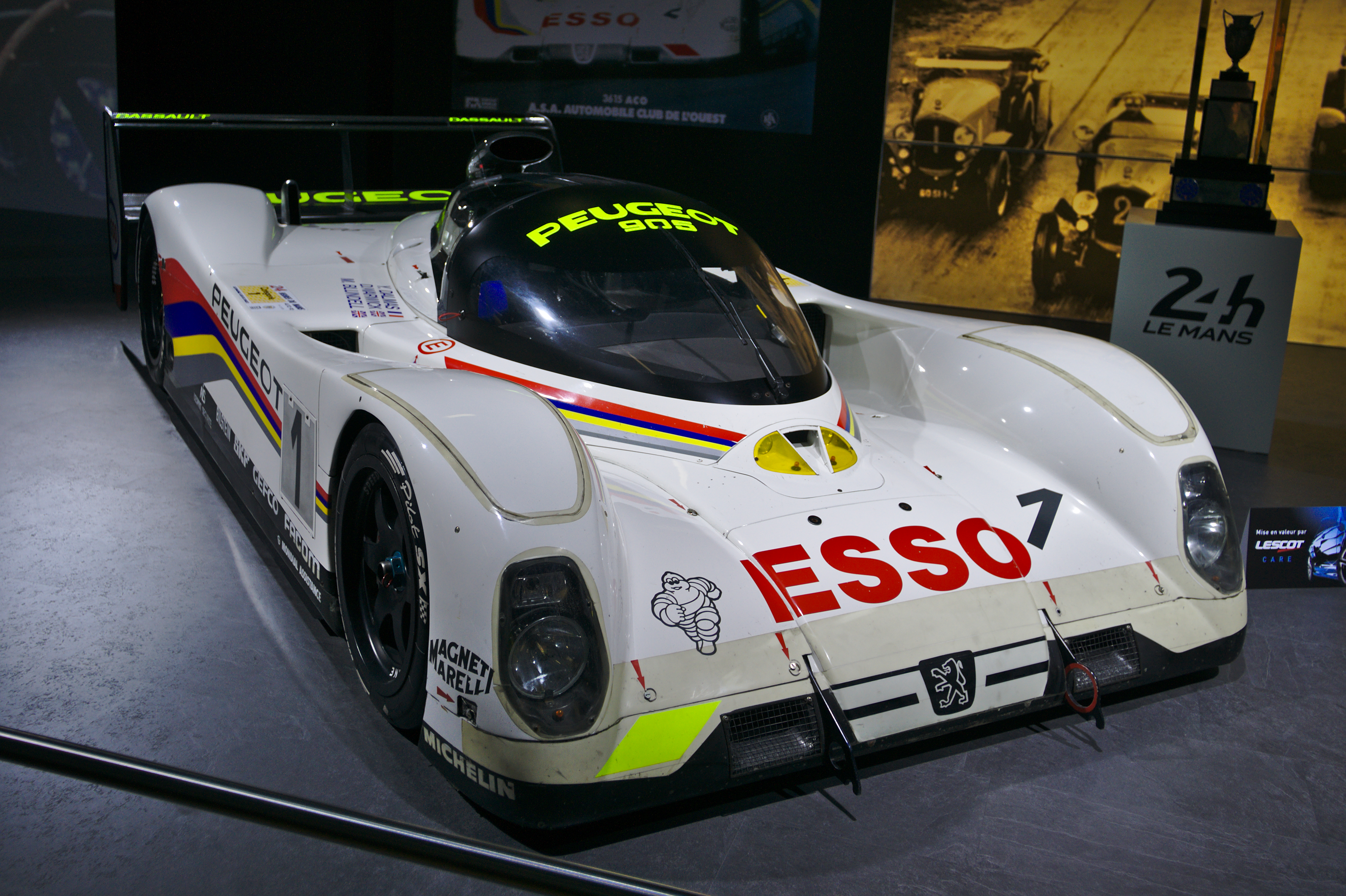
- No. 1 Peugeot 905 on display at the 2014 Geneva International Motor Show
- Category: Group C
- Constructor: Peugeot Sport
- Designers: André de Cortanze; Enrique Scalabroni
- Production: 1990-1993
- Successor: Peugeot 908 HDi FAP

Technical specifications
- Engine: Peugeot SA35-A1 3,499 cc (213.5 cu in) V10 naturally aspirated
- Transmission: 6-speed sequential manual

Competition history
- Notable entrants: (France) Peugeot Talbot Sport
- Notable drivers: (Italy) Mauro Baldi; (France) Philippe Alliot; (Finland) Keke Rosberg; (France) Yannick Dalmas; (United Kingdom) Derek Warwick; (United Kingdom) James Rossiter; (France) Jean-Pierre Jabouille; (Austria) Karl Wendlinger; (Belgium) Eric van de Poele; (France) Alain Ferté; (France) Christophe Bouchut; (France) Éric Hélary
- Debut: 1991 430 km of Suzuka
- First win: 1991 430 km of Suzuka
- Last win: 1993 24 Hours of Le Mans
- Last event: 1993 24 Hours of Le Mans
Races	Wins	Podiums
17	9	18
- Constructors' Championships: 1 (1992)
- Drivers' Championships: 1 (1992)

The Peugeot 905 is a sports-prototype racing car built by Peugeot's racing department, Peugeot Talbot Sport, in the late 1980s after Peugeot had won the Rallye World Championships in 1985 and 1986 and the Turbocharged AWD Group B cars got banned for the WRC 1987, with Peugeot switching to other offroad events, like the Dakar, in the meantime.

The sportscar was initially unveiled in February 1990 and was developed not for Group C, but the new 1991 set of rules that were closer to F1 tech. It made its race debut in the final two races of the 1990 World Sportscar Championship (1990 480 km of Montreal and 1990 480 km of Mexico City). The Peugeot 905 participated in 17 races in its career, winning 9 of them.

The car won the 24 Hours of Le Mans endurance race in 1992 with the team of Derek Warwick, Yannick Dalmas, and Mark Blundell. This win was followed in 1993 by the team of Geoff Brabham, Christophe Bouchut, and Éric Hélary, in the 905B. In addition to that, the car won both the driver’s and the team’s title at the World Sportscar Championship in the 1992 season.

== History ==
=== Inception ===
In November 1988 Peugeot Talbot Sport, established under the control of Jean Todt at Vélizy-Villacoublay, in the suburbs of Paris, announced the launch of the 905 project to compete in the 1991 World Sportscar Championship using the new rules which the 1991 season would introduce.

Technically advanced, the 905 used a carbon fiber chassis engineered by Dassault and a light alloy SA35-A1 3499 cc naturally aspirated V10 engine that was similar to F1 engines of the time. The 905 was built at Vélizy-Villacoublay and was officially unveiled on the 4th of July 1990 at the Circuit de Nevers Magny-Cours, with Jean-Pierre Jabouille driving.

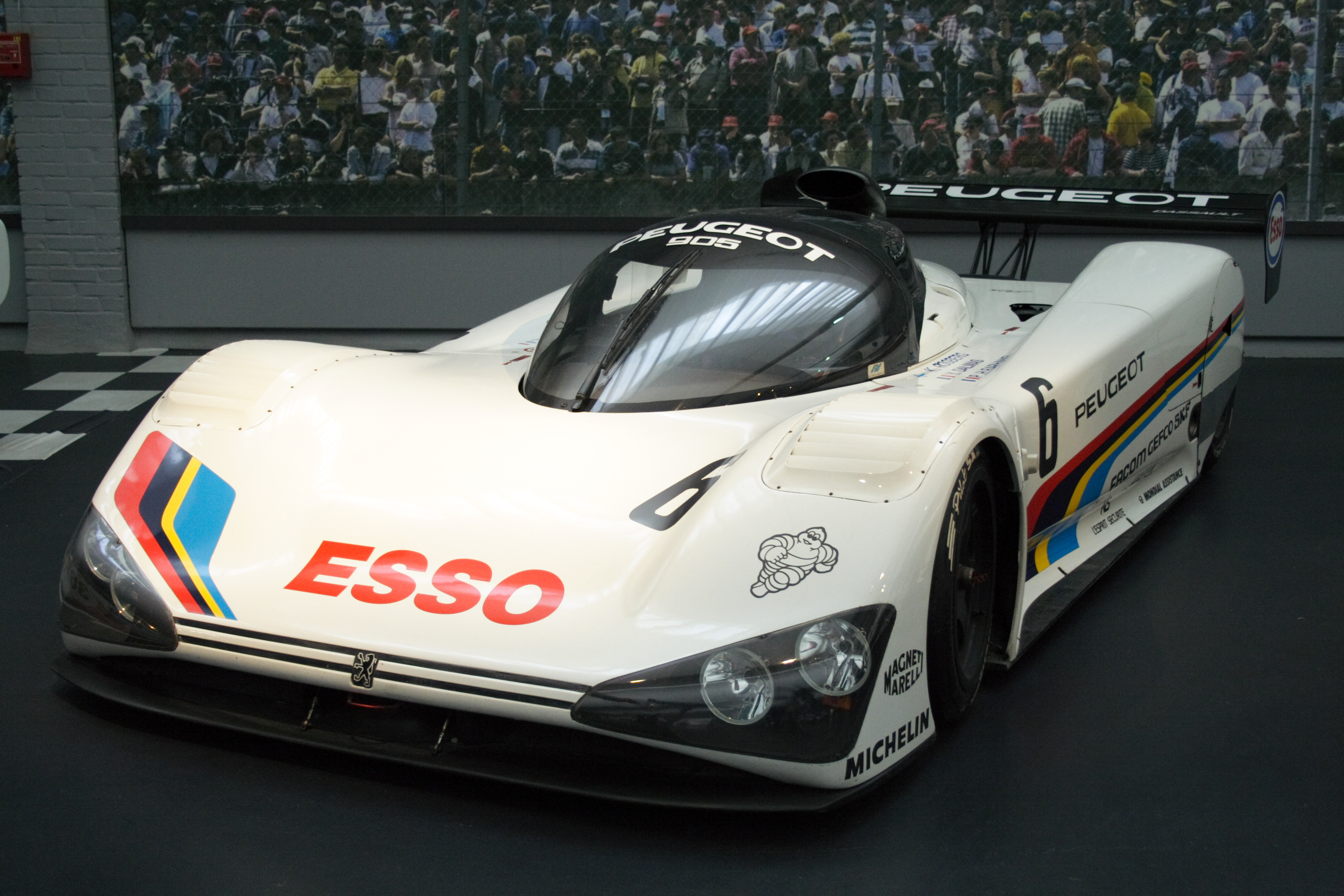
The initial version of the 905 from 1991.

The car made its racing debut in the final two races of the 1990 season with Jabouille and Keke Rosberg sharing the wheel. Although the car was slower than the contemporary Group C Sports Prototypes, it was notably quicker than the other 3.5 litre Sports-Prototypes which raced in that season.

=== 1991 season ===
The 905 began its first full season in the World Sportscar Championship in 1991. Although the car was now quicker than the 1990 version, and indeed the heavily penalised Group C cars that were allowed to race, in the early part of the season the 905 suffered some performance and reliability problems but, more crucially for Peugeot, the car was a lot slower than the standard-setting Jaguar XJR-14 - a car that was able to match the lap times of most contemporary F1 cars (but not those of top cars such the Williams-Renault and McLaren-Honda cars that were at least 2 to 3 seconds faster per lap).

The car was, however, able to obtain a lucky win at the Suzuka Circuit. Unfortunately, at the 1991 24 Hours of Le Mans, both cars entered did not last past the four-hour mark.

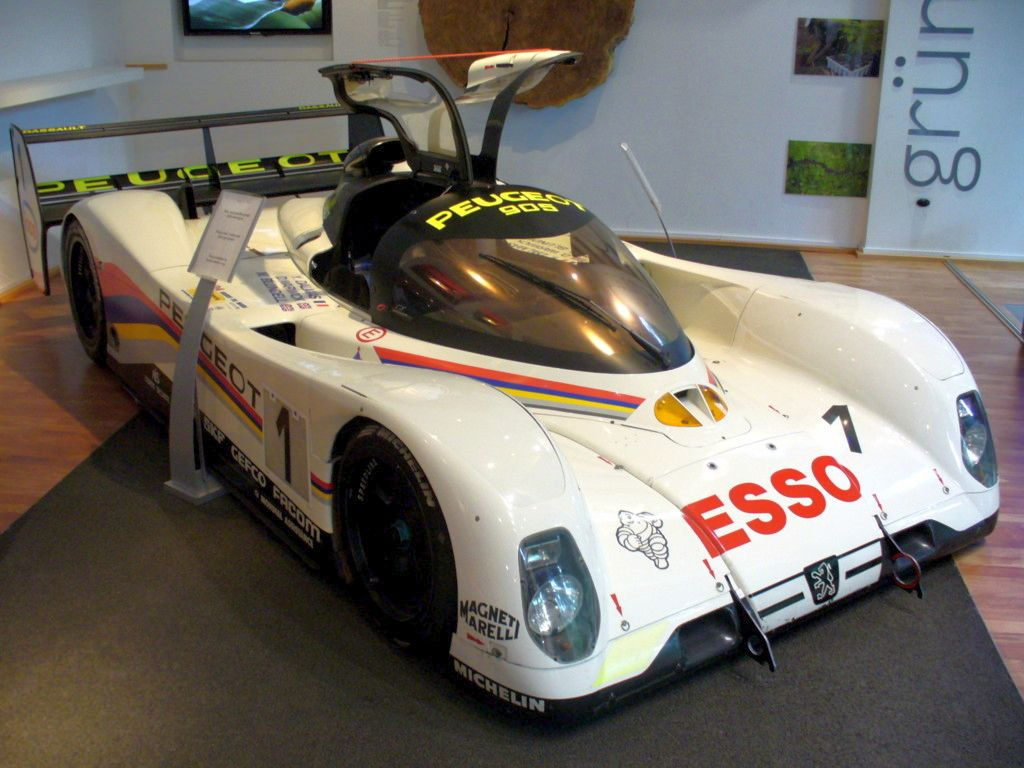
The 905B Evo model, with cockpit doors open.

To counter Jaguar in the remaining races of the championship the 905 was heavily revised, primarily in aerodynamics. Carrying over only the cockpit of the previous car, the evolutionary 905B was created. With the more notable changes consisting of a two-tier rear wing and an optional full-width front wing, including a more powerful SA35-A2 engine, the 905B made its race debut at the Nürburgring round of the 1991 series. These advancements allowed the team to finish the year winning at Magny-Cours and Mexico with back-to-back 1-2 wins, thus completing the season in second place overall.

=== 1992 season ===
The 905B became one of only two factory efforts involved in the 1992 World Sportscar Championship season alongside Toyota, who were competing in their first season under the 3.5-litre regulations using the TS010. This meant that only the 1992 24 Hours of Le Mans showed a strong competition among the Group C cars. The 905B was successful, bringing 2 of the team's 3 cars home in 1st and 3rd overall.

=== 1993 season ===
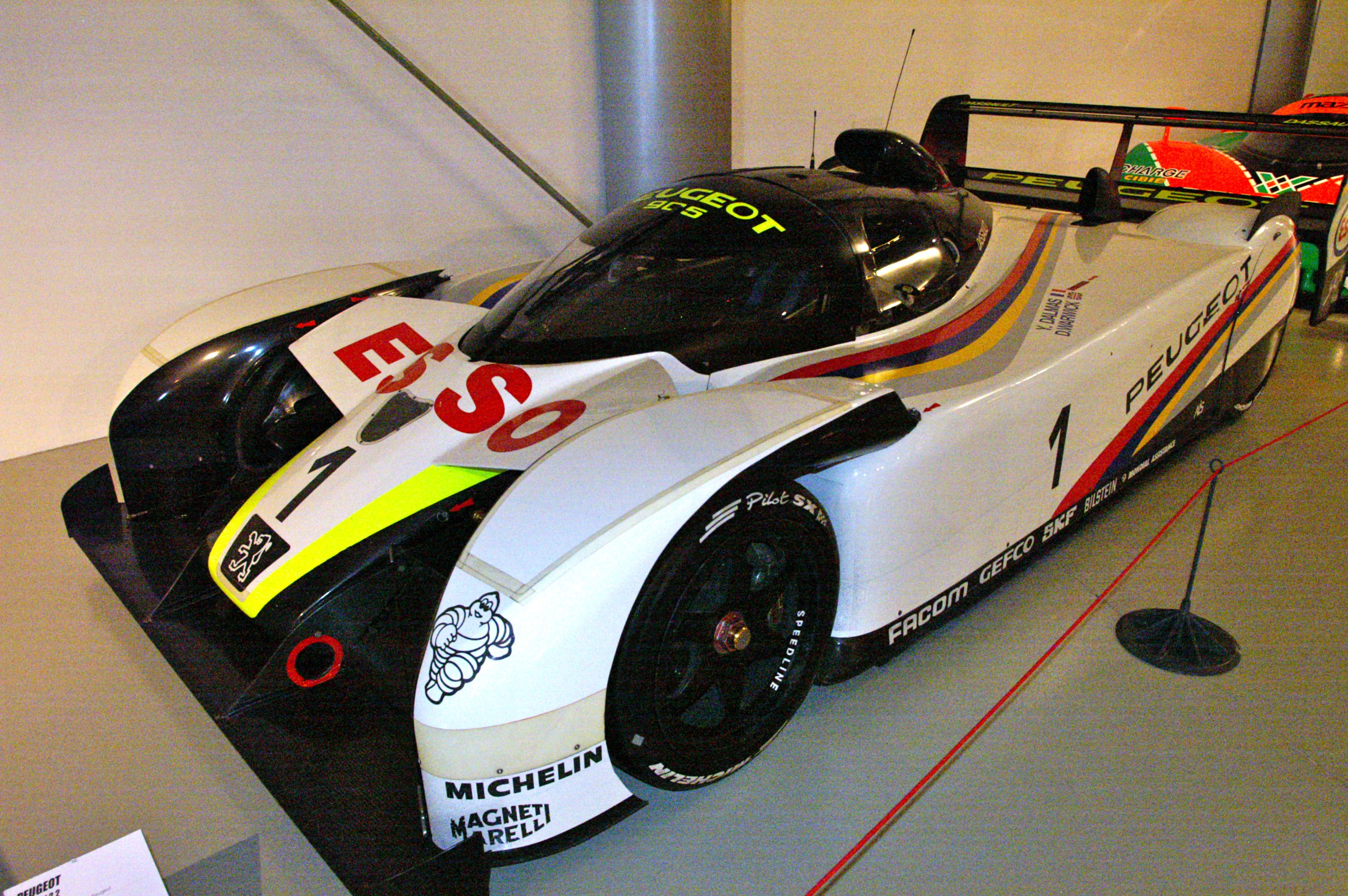
905 Evo2 from 1993.

For 1993, the World Sportscar Championship ceased to exist but were permitted to run at Le Mans in 1993 and 1994. However, prior to the announcement of its cancellation, Peugeot had begun the development of the 905 Evolution 2 to compete in the 1993 season. This car, which was tested for a few laps in practice at the final race of the 1992 season at Magny-Cours was never finished, leaving Peugeot to concentrate solely on 1993 24 Hours of Le Mans with the Evo 1B. They were able to make a historic win by sweeping the first three positions. Following this dominance, Peugeot pulled out of sportscar racing.

Peugeot decided to switch to Formula One, using the same 3.5L V10 from the 905 that was easily adjusted to F1 regulations. In 1994, Peugeot debuted as an engine supplier with the McLaren team and remained in F1 until the end of the 2000 season, when, after little success, they decided to concentrate on the World Rally Championship, where their factory team had had some success, winning the title on several occasions. However, Peugeot withdrew its works WRC operation at the end of the 2005 season, and returned to Le Mans for the 2007 24 Hours, with the new 908 HDi FAP prototype entry.

== Specifications ==
Manufacturer
Peugeot
First race
1990
Category
Group C1
Engine
80° 3,499 cc (214 cu in) V10, 40 valves
Output
650 PS (478 kW; 641 hp) @ 12,500 rpm (905B produced approximately 715 hp (533 kW; 725 PS))
Transmission
6-speed sequential manual, mid-engine, rear-wheel-drive
Chassis
Carbon fiber Monocoque
Length
4.80 metres (189.0 in)
Width
1.96 metres (77.2 in)
Height
1.04 metres (40.9 in)
Weight
780 kg (1,720 lb)
Tires
Michelin 32x63x17 & 34x70x18

== Competition History ==
=== Complete World Sportscar Championship results ===
Year	Entrant	Class	Drivers	No.	1	2	3	4	5	6	7	8	Points	Pos
1991	(France) Peugeot Talbot Sport	C1		5	(Japan) SUZ	(Italy) MNZ	(United Kingdom) SIL	(France) LMS	(Germany) NUR	(France) MAG	(Mexico) MEX	(Japan) AUT	Points	Pos
1991	(France) Peugeot Talbot Sport	C1	(Italy) Mauro Baldi	5	1	8	6	Ret	Ret	2	2	4	69	3rd
1991	(France) Peugeot Talbot Sport	C1	(France) Philippe Alliot	5	1	8	6	Ret	Ret	2	2	4	69	3rd
1991	(France) Peugeot Talbot Sport	C1	(Finland) Keke Rosberg	6	Ret	Ret	Ret	Ret	Ret	1	1	Ret	40	10th
1991	(France) Peugeot Talbot Sport	C1	(France) Yannick Dalmas	6	Ret	Ret	Ret	Ret	Ret	1	1	Ret	40	10th
					(Italy) MNZ	(United Kingdom) SIL	(France) LMS	(United Kingdom) DON	(Japan) SUZ	(France) MAG			Points	Pos
1992	(France) Peugeot Talbot Sport	C1	(France) Yannick Dalmas	1	2	1	1	2	1	5			98	1st
1992	(France) Peugeot Talbot Sport	C1	(United Kingdom) Derek Warwick	1	2	1	1	2	1	5			98	1st
1992	(France) Peugeot Talbot Sport	C1	(United Kingdom) Mark Blundell	1			1						98	1st
1992	(France) Peugeot Talbot Sport	C1	(France) Philippe Alliot	2	Ret	Ret	3	1	3	1			64	2nd
1992	(France) Peugeot Talbot Sport	C1	(Italy) Mauro Baldi	2	Ret	Ret	3	1	3	1			64	2nd
1992	(France) Peugeot Talbot Sport	C1	(France) Jean-Pierre Jabouille	2			3						64	2nd
1992	(France) Peugeot Talbot Sport	C1	(Austria) Karl Wendlinger	31			Ret						NC	NC
1992	(France) Peugeot Talbot Sport	C1	(Belgium) Eric van de Poele	31			Ret						NC	NC
1992	(France) Peugeot Talbot Sport	C1	(France) Alain Ferté	31			Ret						NC	NC
1992	(France) Peugeot Talbot Sport	C1	(France) Christophe Bouchut	71						2			15	14th
1992	(France) Peugeot Talbot Sport	C1	(France) Éric Hélary	71						2			15	14th

=== Complete 24 Hours of Le Mans results ===
Year	Entrant	Class	No	Drivers	Laps	Pos.	Class Pos.
1991	(France) Peugeot Talbot Sport	C1	5	(Italy) Mauro Baldi (France) Philippe Alliot (France) Jean-Pierre Jabouille	22	DNF	DNF
1991	(France) Peugeot Talbot Sport	C1	6	(Finland) Keke Rosberg (France) Yannick Dalmas (France) Pierre-Henri Raphanel	68	DNF	DNF
1992	(France) Peugeot Talbot Sport	C1	1	(United Kingdom) Derek Warwick (France) Yannick Dalmas (United Kingdom) Mark Blundell	352	1st	1st
1992	(France) Peugeot Talbot Sport	C1	2	(Italy) Mauro Baldi (France) Philippe Alliot (France) Jean-Pierre Jabouille	345	3rd	3rd
1992	(France) Peugeot Talbot Sport	C1	31	(Austria) Karl Wendlinger (Belgium) Eric van de Poele (France) Alain Ferté	208	DNF	DNF
1993	(France) Peugeot Talbot Sport	C1	1	(Belgium) Thierry Boutsen (France) Yannick Dalmas (Italy) Teo Fabi	374	2nd	2nd
1993	(France) Peugeot Talbot Sport	C1	2	(France) Philippe Alliot (Italy) Mauro Baldi (France) Jean-Pierre Jabouille	367	3rd	3rd
1993	(France) Peugeot Talbot Sport	C1	3	(France) Éric Hélary (France) Christophe Bouchut (Australia) Geoff Brabham	375	1st	1st
