= Peugeot Sport WRC results =

The table below shows all results of Peugeot Sport in World Rally Championship.

== Group B Era (1984–1986) ==
Year	Car	Driver	1	2	3	4	5	6	7	8	9	10	11	12	13	WDC	Points	WMC	Points
1984	Peugeot 205 Turbo 16	(Finland) Ari Vatanen	MON	SWE	POR	KEN	FRA; Ret	GRC; Ret	NZL	ARG	FIN; 1	ITA; 1	CIV	GBR; 1		4th	60	3rd	74
1984	Peugeot 205 Turbo 16	(France) Jean-Pierre Nicolas	MON	SWE	POR	KEN	FRA; 4	GRC; Ret	NZL	ARG	FIN	ITA; 5	CIV	GBR		14th	18	3rd	74
1985	Peugeot 205 Turbo 16 Peugeot 205 Turbo 16 E2	(Finland) Ari Vatanen	MON; 1	SWE; 1	POR; Ret	KEN; Ret	FRA; Ret	GRC; Ret	NZL; 2	ARG; Ret	FIN	ITA	CIV	GBR		4th	55	1st	142
1985	Peugeot 205 Turbo 16 Peugeot 205 Turbo 16 E2	(Finland) Timo Salonen	MON; 3	SWE; 3	POR; 1	KEN; 7	FRA; Ret	GRC; 1	NZL; 1	ARG; 1	FIN; 1	ITA; 2	CIV	GBR; Ret		1st	127	1st	142
1985	Peugeot 205 Turbo 16 Peugeot 205 Turbo 16 E2	(France) Bruno Saby	MON; 5	SWE	POR	KEN; Ret	FRA; 2	GRC	NZL	ARG	FIN	ITA; Ret	CIV	GBR		23rd	11	1st	142
1985	Peugeot 205 Turbo 16 Peugeot 205 Turbo 16 E2	(Argentina) Carlos Reutemann	MON	SWE	POR	KEN	FRA	GRC	NZL	ARG; 3	FIN	ITA	CIV	GBR		19th	12	1st	142
1985	Peugeot 205 Turbo 16 Peugeot 205 Turbo 16 E2	(Sweden) Kalle Grundel	MON	SWE	POR	KEN	FRA	GRC	NZL	ARG	FIN; 5	ITA	CIV	GBR; Ret		25th	8	1st	142
1985	Peugeot 205 Turbo 16 Peugeot 205 Turbo 16 E2	(Finland) Mikael Sundström	MON	SWE	POR	KEN	FRA	GRC	NZL	ARG	FIN	ITA	CIV	GBR; Ret		–	0	1st	142
1986	Peugeot 205 Turbo 16 E2	(Finland) Timo Salonen	MON; 2	SWE; Ret	POR; Ret	KEN	FRA; Ret	GRC; Ret	NZL; 5	ARG	FIN; 1	CIV	ITA; Ret	GBR; 1	USA	3rd	63	1st	137
1986	Peugeot 205 Turbo 16 E2	(Finland) Juha Kankkunen	MON; 5	SWE; 1	POR; Ret	KEN; 5	FRA	GRC; 1	NZL; 1	ARG; Ret	FIN; 2	CIV	ITA; Ret	GBR; 3	USA; 2	1st	118	1st	137
1986	Peugeot 205 Turbo 16 E2	(France) Bruno Saby	MON; 6	SWE	POR	KEN	FRA; 1	GRC; 3	NZL	ARG; Ret	FIN	CIV	ITA; Ret	GBR	USA	7th	38	1st	137
1986	Peugeot 205 Turbo 16 E2	(France) Michéle Mouton	MON; Ret	SWE	POR	KEN	FRA; Ret	GRC	NZL	ARG	FIN	CIV	ITA	GBR	USA	–	0	1st	137
1986	Peugeot 205 Turbo 16 E2	(Kenya) Shekhar Mehta	MON	SWE	POR	KEN; 8	FRA	GRC	NZL	ARG	FIN	CIV	ITA	GBR	USA	49th	3	1st	137
1986	Peugeot 205 Turbo 16 E2	(Sweden) Stig Blomqvist	MON	SWE	POR	KEN	FRA	GRC	NZL	ARG; 3	FIN; 4	CIV	ITA	GBR	USA	11th	22	1st	137
1986	Peugeot 205 Turbo 16 E2	(Italy) Andrea Zanussi	MON	SWE	POR	KEN	FRA	GRC	NZL	ARG	FIN	CIV	ITA; Ret	GBR	USA	–	0	1st	137
1986	Peugeot 205 Turbo 16 E2	(Finland) Mikael Sundström	MON	SWE	POR	KEN	FRA	GRC	NZL	ARG	FIN	CIV	ITA	GBR; 4	USA	22nd	10	1st	137

== Kit Car Era (1997–1998) ==
Year	Car	No	Driver	1	2	3	4	5	6	7	8	9	10	11	12	13	14	WDC	Points	WMC	Points
1997	Peugeot 306 Maxi	7	(France) Gilles Panizzi	MON	SWE	KEN	POR	ESP; 3	FRA; 3	ARG	GRE	NZL	FIN	IDN	ITA	AUS	GBR	10th	8	–	0
1997	Peugeot 306 Maxi	8	(France) François Delecour	MON	SWE	KEN	POR	ESP; EX	FRA; 4	ARG	GRE	NZL	FIN	IDN	ITA	AUS	GBR	19th	3	–	0
1998	Peugeot 306 Maxi	11	(France) François Delecour	MON; 10	SWE	KEN	POR	ESP; 8	FRA; 2	ARG	GRE	NZL	FIN	ITA; Ret	AUS	GBR		10th	6	–	0
1998	Peugeot 306 Maxi	14	(France) Gilles Panizzi	MON; 9	SWE	KEN	POR	ESP; 6	FRA; 4	ARG	GRE	NZL	FIN	ITA; 5	AUS	GBR		12th	6	–	0
1998	Peugeot 306 Maxi	18	(Portugal) Adruzilo Lopes	MON; 12	SWE	KEN	POR	ESP	FRA	ARG	GRE	NZL	FIN	ITA	AUS	GBR		–	0	–	0

== World Rally Car Era (1999–2005) ==
Year	Car	No	Driver	1	2	3	4	5	6	7	8	9	10	11	12	13	14	15	16	WDC	Points	WMC	Points
1999	Peugeot 206 WRC	14	(France) François Delecour	MON	SWE	KEN	POR	ESP	FRA; Ret	ARG	GRE; Ret	NZL	FIN; 9	CHN	ITA; Ret	AUS; Ret	GBR; Ret			16th*	3*	6th	11
1999	Peugeot 206 WRC	15	(France) Gilles Panizzi						FRA; Ret						ITA; 2					10th	6	6th	11
1999	Peugeot 206 WRC	15	(Finland) Marcus Grönholm	MON	SWE	KEN	POR	ESP		ARG	GRE; Ret	NZL	FIN; 4	CHN		AUS; 5	GBR; Ret			15th*	5*	6th	11
1999	Peugeot 206 WRC	21	(Finland) Marcus Grönholm					FRA							ITA; 8					15th*	5*	6th	11
1999	Peugeot 206 WRC	22	(France) Gilles Panizzi	MON	SWE	KEN	POR	ESP	FRA	ARG	GRE	NZL	FIN; 33	CHN	ITA	AUS	GBR; 7			10th*	6*	6th	11
2000	Peugeot 206 WRC	9	(France) François Delecour	MON; Ret	SWE; 7	KEN	POR; 5	ESP; 7	ARG; 13	GRE; 9	NZL; Ret	FIN	CYP; 3	FRA; 2	ITA; 2	AUS; 3	GBR; 6			6th	24	1st	111
2000	Peugeot 206 WRC	9	(France) Gilles Panizzi			KEN; Ret														7th	21	1st	111
2000	Peugeot 206 WRC	9	(Finland) Sebastian Lindholm									FIN; 5								19th	2	1st	111
2000	Peugeot 206 WRC	10	(France) Gilles Panizzi	MON; Ret	SWE	KEN	POR	ESP; 6	ARG	GRE	NZL	FIN	CYP	FRA; 1	ITA; 1	AUS	GBR			7th	21	1st	111
2000	Peugeot 206 WRC	10	(Finland) Marcus Grönholm		SWE; 1	KEN; Ret	POR; 2		ARG; 2	GRE; Ret	NZL; 1	FIN; 1	CYP; Ret			AUS; 1	GBR; 2			1st	65	1st	111
2000	Peugeot 206 WRC	16	(Finland) Marcus Grönholm	MON; Ret				ESP; 5						FRA; 5	ITA; 4					1st	65	1st	111
2000	Peugeot 206 WRC	18	(France) François Delecour	MON	SWE	KEN	POR	ESP	ARG	GRE	NZL	FIN; 6	CYP	FRA	ITA	AUS	GBR			6th	24	1st	111
2000	Peugeot 206 WRC	19	(France) Gilles Panizzi	MON	SWE	KEN	POR	ESP	ARG	GRE	NZL	FIN	CYP	FRA	ITA	AUS; Ret	GBR; 8			7th	21	1st	111
2001	Peugeot 206 WRC	1	(Finland) Marcus Grönholm	MON; Ret	SWE; Ret	POR; 3	ESP; Ret	ARG; Ret	CYP; Ret	GRC; Ret	KEN; Ret	FIN; 1	NZL; 5	ITA; 7	FRA; Ret	AUS; 1	GBR; 1			4th	36	1st	106
2001	Peugeot 206 WRC	2	(France) Didier Auriol	MON; Ret	SWE; Ret	POR; 8	ESP; 1	ARG; Ret	CYP; Ret	GRC; Ret	KEN; Ret	FIN; Ret	NZL; 6	ITA; 3	FRA; 3	AUS; 3	GBR; 7			7th	23	1st	106
2001	Peugeot 206 WRC	16	(France) Gilles Panizzi	MON; Ret			ESP; 2							ITA; 1	FRA; 2					8th	22	1st	106
2001	Peugeot 206 WRC	16	(Finland) Harri Rovanperä		SWE; 1	POR; Ret		ARG; Ret	CYP; Ret	GRC; 3	KEN; 2	FIN; 4	NZL; 3			AUS; 4	GBR; 2			5th	36	1st	106
2001	Peugeot 206 WRC	19	(France) Gilles Panizzi	MON	SWE	POR	ESP	ARG	CYP	GRC	KEN	FIN	NZL	ITA	FRA	AUS; 9	GBR			8th	22	1st	106
2002	Peugeot 206 WRC	1	(United Kingdom) Richard Burns	MON; 8	SWE; 4	FRA; 3	ESP; 2	CYP; 2	ARG; DSQ	GRE; Ret	KEN; Ret	FIN; 2	GER; 2	ITA; 4	NZL; Ret	AUS; Ret	GBR; Ret			5th	34	1st	165
2002	Peugeot 206 WRC	2	(Finland) Marcus Grönholm	MON; 5	SWE; 1	FRA; 2	ESP; 4	CYP; 1	ARG; DSQ	GRC; 2	KEN; Ret	FIN; 1	GER; 3	ITA; 2	NZL; 1	AUS; 1	GBR; Ret			1st	77	1st	165
2002	Peugeot 206 WRC	3	(Finland) Harri Rovanperä		SWE; 2			CYP; 4	ARG; Ret	GRC; 4	KEN; 2	FIN; Ret	GER; Ret		NZL; 2	AUS; 2	GBR; 7			7th	30	1st	165
2002	Peugeot 206 WRC	3	(France) Gilles Panizzi	MON; 7		FRA; 1	ESP; 1							ITA; 1						6th	31	1st	165
2002	Peugeot 206 WRC	23	(France) Gilles Panizzi		SWE			CYP; 10	ARG; Ret		KEN; 6	FIN	GER		NZL; 7	AUS	GBR			6th	31	1st	165
2003	Peugeot 206 WRC	1	(Finland) Marcus Grönholm	MON; 13	SWE; 1	TUR; 9	NZL; 1	ARG; 1	GRC; Ret	CYP; Ret	GER; 2	FIN; Ret	AUS; Ret	ITA; Ret	FRA; 4	ESP; 6	GBR; Ret			6th	46	2nd	145
2003	Peugeot 206 WRC	2	(United Kingdom) Richard Burns	MON; 5	SWE; 3	TUR; 2	NZL; 2	ARG; 3	GRE; 4	CYP; Ret	GER; 3	FIN; 3	AUS; 3	ITA; 7	FRA; 8	ESP; Ret	GBR			4th	58	2nd	145
2003	Peugeot 206 WRC	2	(Belgium) Freddy Loix														GBR; 6			14th*	4*	2nd	145
2003	Peugeot 206 WRC	3	(France) Gilles Panizzi	MON; Ret							GER; 10			ITA; 2	FRA; 6	ESP; 1				10th	27	2nd	145
2003	Peugeot 206 WRC	3	(Finland) Harri Rovanperä		SWE; Ret	TUR; Ret	NZL; Ret	ARG; 4	GRC; 6	CYP; 2		FIN; Ret	AUS; 7				GBR; Ret			11th	18	2nd	145
2004	Peugeot 307 WRC	5	(Finland) Marcus Grönholm	MON; 4	SWE; 2	MEX; 6	NZL; 2	CYP; DSQ	GRC; Ret	TUR; 2	ARG; Ret	FIN; 1	GER; Ret	JPN; 4	GBR; Ret	ITA; 7	FRA; 4	ESP; 2	AUS; Ret	5th	62	4th	101
2004	Peugeot 307 WRC	6	(Belgium) Freddy Loix	MON; 5	SWE; Ret													ESP; Ret		10th	9	4th	101
2004	Peugeot 307 WRC	6	(Finland) Harri Rovanperä			MEX; 10	NZL; 5	CYP; DSQ	GRC; 3	TUR; Ret	ARG; 5	FIN; Ret		JPN; 6	GBR; 6	ITA; Ret			AUS; 2	8th	28	4th	101
2004	Peugeot 307 WRC	6	(France) Cédric Robert										GER; 5				FRA; Ret			17th	4	4th	101
2004	Peugeot 307 WRC	9	(Belgium) Freddy Loix			MEX	NZL	CYP	GRC	TUR	ARG	FIN	GER; 6	JPN	GBR	ITA	FRA; 7		AUS	10th	9	4th	101
2004	Peugeot 307 WRC	14	(Finland) Sebastian Lindholm	MON	SWE	MEX	NZL	CYP	GRC	TUR	ARG	FIN; Ret	GER	JPN	GBR	ITA	FRA	ESP	AUS	–	0	4th	101
2004	Peugeot 307 WRC	15	(Sweden) Daniel Carlsson	MON	SWE	MEX	NZL	CYP	GRC	TUR	ARG	FIN	GER	JPN	GBR; Ret	ITA	FRA	ESP	AUS	12th*	6*	4th	101
2005	Peugeot 307 WRC	7	(Finland) Marcus Grönholm	MON; 5	SWE; Ret	MEX; 2	NZL; 2	ITA; 3	CYP; Ret	TUR; 3	GRC; 4	ARG; 2	FIN; 1	GER; 3	GBR; Ret	JPN; 1	FRA; Ret	ESP; Ret	AUS; Ret	3rd	71	2nd	135
2005	Peugeot 307 WRC	8	(Estonia) Markko Märtin	MON; 4	SWE; 2	MEX; 3	NZL; 5	ITA; 4	CYP; 3	TUR; 5	GRC; 8	ARG; 6	FIN; 3	GER; 4	GBR; Ret					5th	53	2nd	135
2005	Peugeot 307 WRC	8	(Sweden) Daniel Carlsson													JAP; 8			AUS; Ret	19th*	5*	2nd	135
2005	Peugeot 307 WRC	8	(France) Nicolas Bernardi														FRA; 8	ESP; 6		20th*	4*	2nd	135
2005	Peugeot 307 WRC	19	(Sweden) Daniel Carlsson	MON	SWE; 6	MEX	NZL	ITA	CYP	TUR	GRC	ARG	FIN	GER	GBR		FRA	ESP		19th*	5*	2nd	135
2005	Peugeot 307 WRC	19	(Finland) Sebastian Lindholm	MON	SWE	MEX	NZL	ITA	CYP	TUR	GRC	ARG	FIN; Ret	GER	GBR	JAP	FRA	ESP	AUS	–	0	2nd	135
