= EDC Paris Business School =

Business school in Paris, France

- École des dirigeants et créateurs d'entreprise
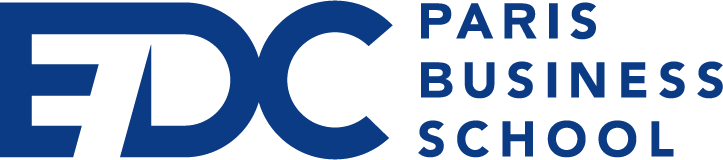
- Motto: Ethics, Solidarity and Spirit of conquest
- Type: Private Business school
- Established: 1950
- Affiliations: Sup de luxe, Sport Management School, Chair Cartier, UGEI
- President: Alain-Dominique Perrin
- Director: Jean Marcel Jammet
- Students: 1300
- Location: Paris La défense, Île-de-France, France; 48.89°N 2.253°E
- Campus: La Défense
- Colors: Blue and White
- Mascot: An Owl (Cacahuète la chouette)
- Website: www.edcparis.edu

EDC Paris Business School, also called Ecole des Dirigeants et des Créateurs d'entreprise, is a French business School in the city of Paris located in the business district La Défense. It offers four complete programs in English at undergraduate, graduate and post graduate levels (luxury brand management) Its MBA Luxury Brand Marketing and International Management is ranked 9th worldwide by Eduniversal. In partnership with the jewellery house Cartier, EDC created Sup de Luxe, a school offering programmes in luxury management.

Established in 1950, EDC Paris Business School provides business and management courses to 1300 students, both in French and in English.

The school is ranked among the best 20 Business Schools in France by Le figaro.

== Admissions ==
French students, unless they have studied abroad, must succeed at a competitive entrance examination, known as the concours. There are two concours, depending on undergraduate studies:

The school is located in the business district of Paris, La Défense.

Concours Link (2450 candidates in 2014 for 250 selected)

250 places are offered to the best student after the Baccalauréat (High school diploma)

Concours Passerelle (7400 candidates in 2014 for 2 800 selected)

- 60 places for 1 500 selected are offered to the best students holding a BTS, DUT or classes préparatoires aux grandes écoles for 3 years.
- 40 places for 1 300 selected are offered to the best students holding a bachelor's degree or a Licence program for 2 years.

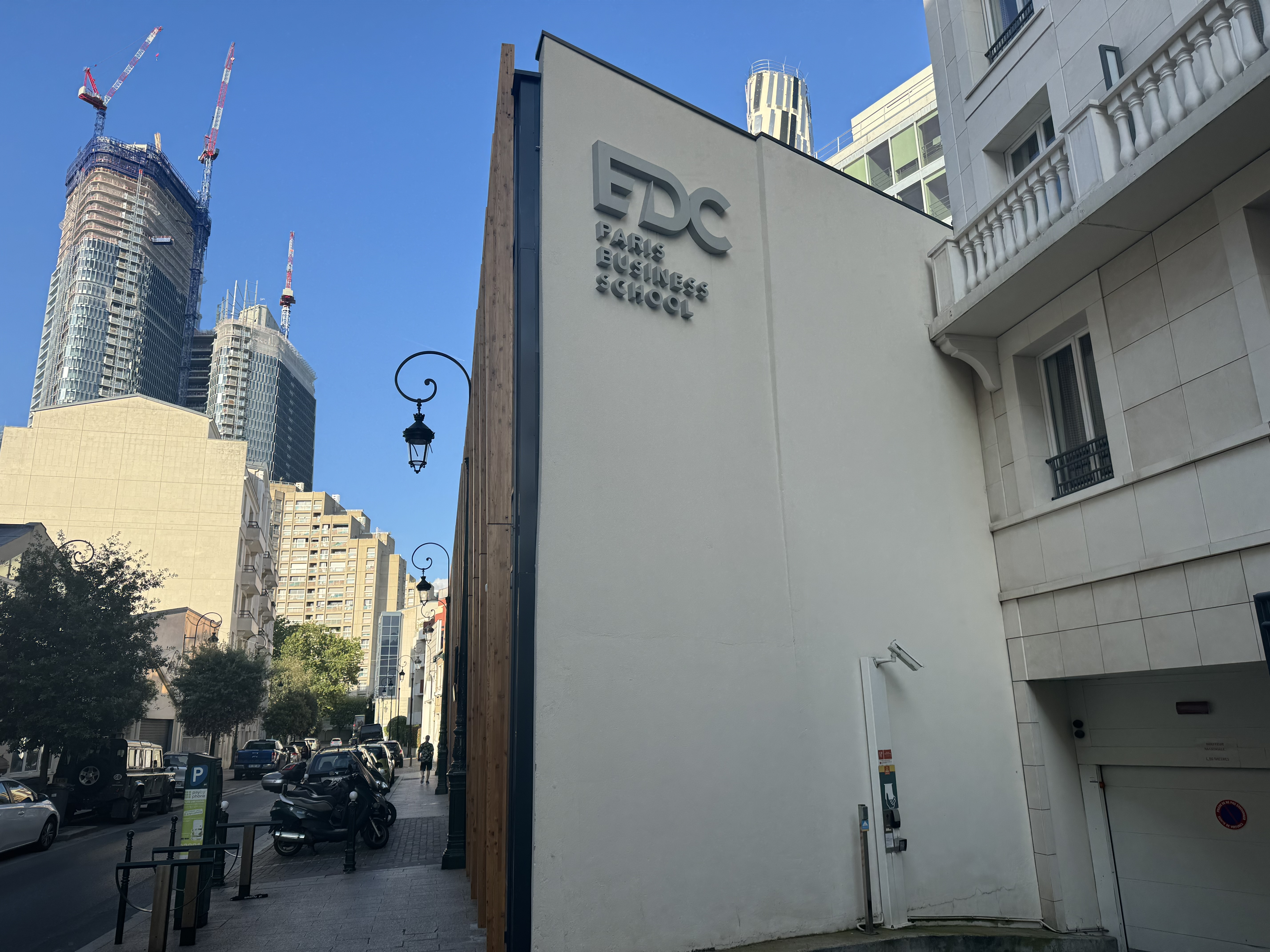
The building of the EDC Paris Business School.

Their curriculum includes a written examination with 4 test: literary essay on an economic subject, test arpeggio (general knowledge, memorization, algebra, logic), English test and Test in the choice (Mathematics, management, law, economy, management, marketing, philosophy) and then an oral examinations: English Test, interview in Spanish or in German and then an important interview in every school of the concours in front of professional's jury (ex: CEO).

== World Partner universities ==
- San Diego Alliant International University (US) Dual degrees
- Santa Barbara College (US) Dual degrees
- Curtin University (Australia) Dual degrees
- West Saxon University (Netherlands) Dual degrees
- Bucharest Academy of Economic Studies (Romania) Dual degrees
- Montesquieu University (France) Dual degrees
- Paris West University Nanterre (France) Dual degrees

== Sup De Luxe ==
The Institut Supérieur de Marketing du Luxe was founded by Alain-Dominique Perrin, in collaboration with Cartier in 1990. By creating the Institut Supérieur de Marketing du Luxe, Cartier first trained a large number of its managers and then offered other brands creative profiles with the values of the sector.

Sup de Luxe, currently located at the La Villette campus in Paris' 19th Arrondissement, was the first educational institute in France specialising in the luxury management. The absence of luxury management schools is what gave Perrin his initial idea of founding the school. Its initial aim was to produce young managers and experts in the luxury field and to stimulate research into luxury on a global scale.

== Notable EDC Paris Business School faculty and staff ==
Some names of the list:

- Alain-Dominique Perrin, ex President of Richemont and President of EDC Paris Business School.
- Max Berre, Brussels-based financial and policy economist.
- Robert Louis-Dreyfus, Businessman and CEO of Adidas-Salomon
- Jean Todt, motor sport executive
- Michel Trollé, founder of Century 21

== History ==
Founded in 1950, EDC PARIS is one of the oldest business schools in France.

== Accreditations and associations ==
Sourced from EDC Paris Business School Programme

Accredited by European Foundation for Management Development (EFMD)

- Fully accredited by the French Ministry of Education and Research, it delivers a state-approved Master's degree in business studies.
- Accredited by European Foundation for Management Development (EFMD)
  The school is a Member of the Conférence des Grandes Écoles, which groups together the best engineering and business schools.
  Member of the Conférence des Grandes Écoles
- Member of the Fondation Nationale pour l’Enseignement de la Gestion des Entreprises (FNEGE)
- Member of the NAFSA Association of International Educators
- Member of the EAIE (European Association for International Education)
- Member of ERASMUS
- Member of Campus France
- Member of the Association to Advance Collegiate Schools of Business (AACSB International)
- Partnership of Incubateur de l’École Nationale Supérieure des Arts et Métiers (ENSAM) (Produced in Brittany)
- Member of Campus responsables
