= Jean Todt =

French motor racing executive (born 1946)

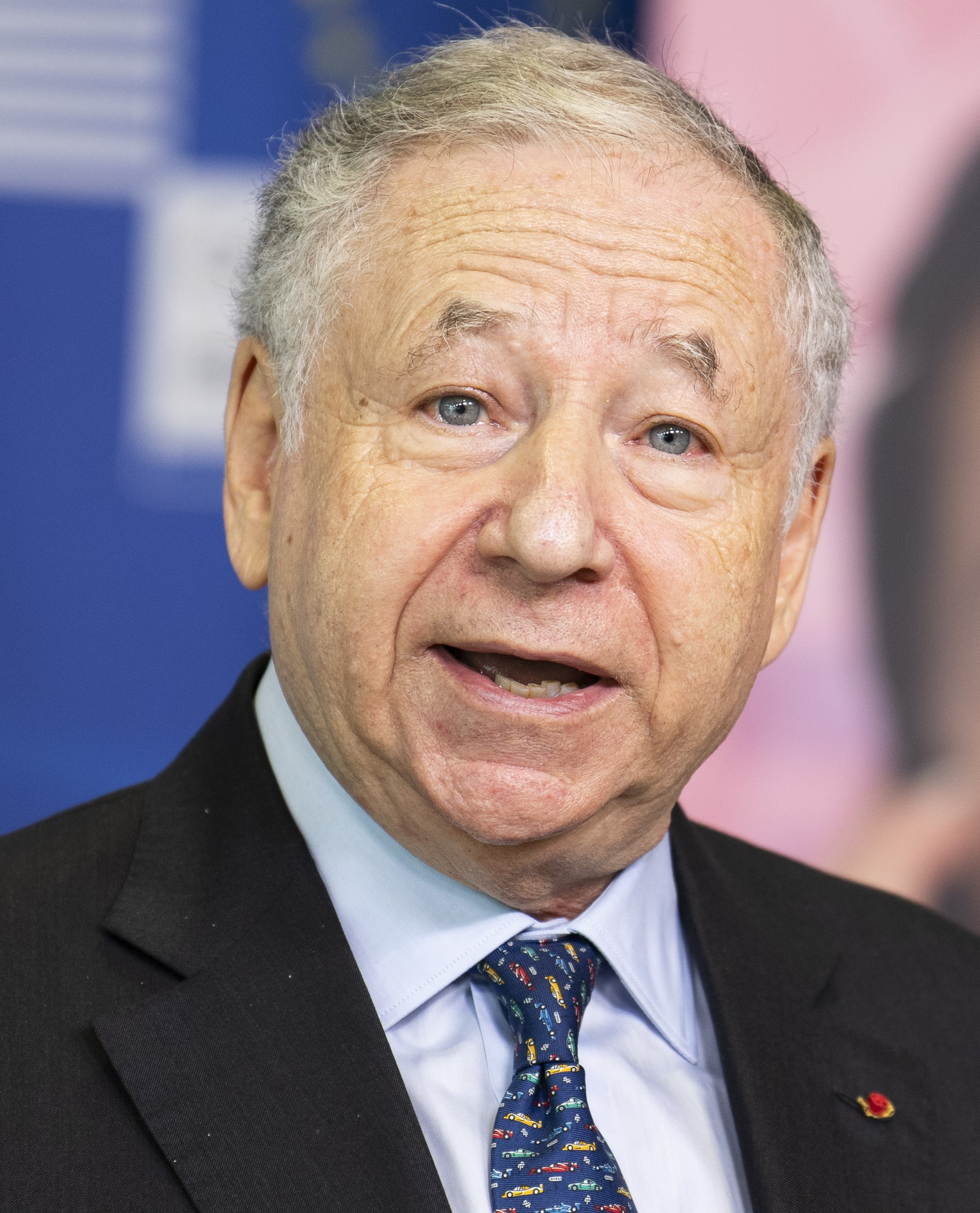
- Todt in 2023

President of Fédération Internationale de l'Automobile
- In office 23 October 2009 – 17 December 2021
- Preceded by: Max Mosley
- Succeeded by: Mohammed Ben Sulayem

United Nations Secretary General's Special Envoy for Road Safety
- Incumbent
- Assumed office 29 April 2015

Personal details
- Born: Jean Henri Todt; 25 February 1946 (age 80) Pierrefort, Cantal, France
- Spouse: Michelle Yeoh (m. 2023)
- Children: Nicolas Todt
- Education: École des Cadres
- Occupation: Motor racing executive
- Awards: Grand Croix de la Légion d'honneur
World Rally Championship record
- Years active: 1973–1981
- Driver: (Sweden) Ove Andersson (France) Jean Guichet (Germany) Achim Warmbold (Finland) Hannu Mikkola (France) Jean-Pierre Nicolas (France) Jean-Claude Lefèbvre (Finland) Timo Mäkinen (France) Guy Fréquelin
- Teams: Alpine-Renault, Toyota, BMW, Opel, Fiat, Peugeot, Talbot
- Rallies: 54
- Championships: 0
- Rally wins: 4
- Podiums: 14
- First rally: 1973 Monte Carlo Rally
- First win: 1973 Polish Rally
- Last win: 1981 Rally Argentina
- Last rally: 1981 RAC Rally

Jean Henri Todt (French: [ʒɑ̃ tɔd]; born 25 February 1946) is a French motor racing executive and former rally co-driver. He was previously director of Peugeot Talbot Sport and then Scuderia Ferrari Formula 1 team principal, before being appointed chief executive officer of Ferrari from 2004 to 2008. From 2009 to 2021 he served as the ninth president of the Fédération Internationale de l'Automobile (FIA).

In 1966, Todt started his career as a rally co-driver and participated in World Championship rallies until 1981 when, with Guy Fréquelin, he won the Constructors' World Rally Championship with Talbot Lotus. Under Todt's leadership, Peugeot won four World Rally Championship titles (drivers and manufacturers), won the Paris-Dakar Rally four times, and twice won the Le Mans 24 Hours. During his time in charge at Ferrari, their teams won 13 Formula One World Championship titles (drivers and manufacturers). Also under Todt's leadership, Michael Schumacher won five consecutive World Drivers' Championships, from 2000 to 2004, and 72 of his 91 victories.

In October 2009, Todt was elected President of the Fédération Internationale de l'Automobile (FIA); he was re-elected in December 2013 and December 2017. Todt's most recent term as FIA President ended in December 2021. On 29 April 2015, Todt had been appointed the United Nations' Special Envoy for Road Safety.

== Life and career ==
Jean Todt was born in Pierrefort, a southern Cantal village in the Auvergne region of France.

After high school, Todt studied at the Ecole des Cadres School of Economics and Business in Paris.

=== Rally co-driver: 1966 to 1981 ===
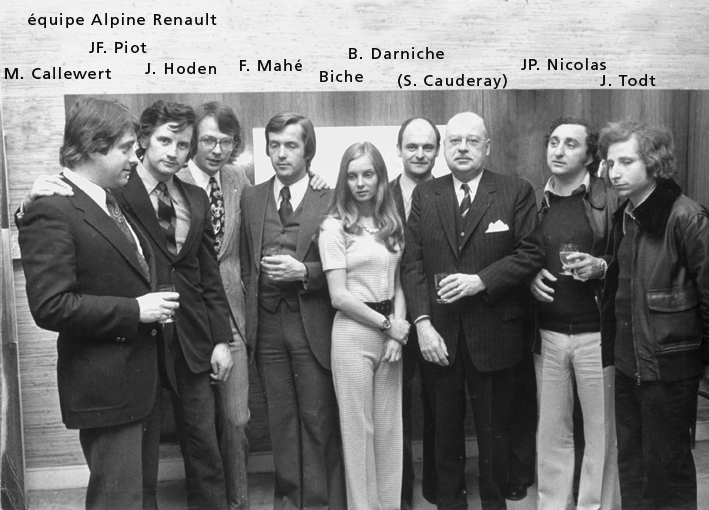
Todt (right) with Darniche, Nicolas and Piot in 1973

The young Todt was fascinated by motorsport and had special respect for drivers like Jim Clark and Dan Gurney. Borrowing his parents' Mini Cooper to drive in rallies, he soon decided his greatest strength was as a co-driver. He first co-drove with Guy Chasseuil in 1966 and his talent for calculation, strategy and organisation quickly made him a sought-after navigator. By 1969, Todt was involved with world-class rally stars such as Jean-Pierre Nicolas, Rauno Aaltonen, Ove Andersson, Hannu Mikkola and Guy Fréquelin. He went on to enjoy success as a co-driver with Jean-François Piot, Ove Andersson, Achim Warmbold, Jean Guichet, Hannu Mikkola, Jean-Claude Lefèbvre, Timo Mäkinen, Jean-Pierre Nicolas and Guy Fréquelin.

In 1981, as Guy Fréquelin's co-driver with Talbot, a Peugeot subsidiary, he won the manufacturers’ World Rally Championship and was runner-up in the drivers' World Rally Championship. At the same time, he was increasingly moving out from his role as a co-driver by participating in the management of the team and in relations with the FIA.

Todt also represented the drivers in the FISA (Fédération Internationale du Sport Automobile) Rally Commission from 1975 to 1981.

=== Director of Peugeot Talbot Sport: 1982 to 1993 ===
In 1981, Todt retired from competing as a co-driver and was appointed Director of Racing for Peugeot by CEO Jean Boillot at a time when PSA Peugeot Citroën was experiencing major financial difficulties as well as image problems. He applied his abilities as an organiser and strategist to the creation of Peugeot Talbot Sport, which he set up to spearhead the firm's return to competition. He was the mastermind behind the Peugeot 205 Turbo 16, Peugeot 405 Turbo 16 and Peugeot 905.

In 1984, Peugeot returned to the World Rally Championship and, in 1985 and 1986, the Peugeot 205 Turbo 16 Group B driven first by Timo Salonen then by Juha Kankkunen obtained back-to-back manufacturers' World Championship titles. In 1986, Henri Toivonen died driving a Lancia Delta S4 during the Tour de Corse rally and the FIA decided to drop the Group B class as being too fast and too dangerous.

In 1987, Todt adapted the 205 Turbo 16 to off-road rallies with the aim of competing in the showcase Paris-Dakar Rally. He became the centre of attention in the 1989 Paris-Dakar when he tossed a coin to decide between his two drivers Ari Vatanen and Jacky Ickx to ensure that their rivalry would not lead to one of them quitting and costing the team victory. From 1987 to 1990, he oversaw four successive victories in the Paris-Dakar with Vatanen and Juha Kankkunen. Peugeot subsequently decided to withdraw from off-road rallying and left the field open to Citroën who won the event with the Citroën ZX Rallye-Raid, based on the Peugeot 405 chassis.

In 1992, Todt won the Le Mans 24 Hours with the Peugeot 905 driven by Derek Warwick, Yannick Dalmas and Mark Blundell and, in 1993, again at Le Mans, three 905 cars driven by Geoff Brabham, Christophe Bouchut and Éric Hélary achieved a 1-2-3 victory.

=== General Manager of Scuderia Ferrari: 1994 to 2007 ===
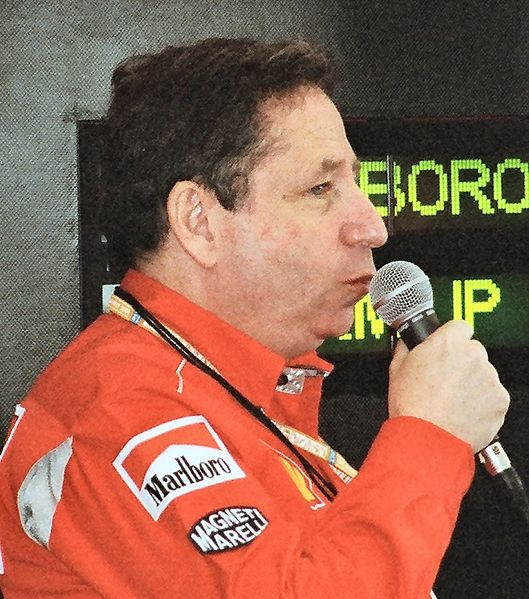
Todt in 2001

In 1993, at the age of 47, Todt's 12 years with Peugeot Talbot Sport came to an end. He was recruited by Luca di Montezemolo, the new CEO of Scuderia Ferrari. On 1 July of that year at the French Grand Prix at Magny-Cours, he started as the General Manager of the Racing Division at the head of a team of 400 technicians.

Todt was the first non-Italian since Marco Piccinini to head the Scuderia. His challenge was to lead Ferrari back to success at a time when the team was experiencing some of the worst days in its history. The Italian team was undermined by internal quarrels and a production system that was partly delocalised. The Scuderia had won no driver's championship since 1979. Todt set about restructuring the management of the Racing Division.

In 1994, barely a year after Todt took up the challenge, Gerhard Berger won the German Grand Prix (Ferrari's first win in four years). Even so, Michael Schumacher's Benetton-Ford (world champion in 1994 and 1995) and the Williams-Renault cars of Ayrton Senna, Damon Hill, Nigel Mansell and David Coulthard largely dominated the competition.

At the end of the 1995 season, Todt asked the German double world champion Michael Schumacher to join the Scuderia.

In 1996, after winning the Spanish Grand Prix early on the season, Schumacher won two consecutive victories in first the Belgian and then the Italian Grand Prix. Todt then hired two former Benetton managers, the designer and aerodynamics specialist Rory Byrne and technical director Ross Brawn, to replace John Barnard.

In 1997 and 1998, Ferrari missed out on the world drivers' title by a few points during the final races of the season, in 1997 behind Jacques Villeneuve's Williams-Renault and in 1998 and 1999 behind Mika Häkkinen's McLaren-Mercedes, mainly because of Schumacher's early season injury at Silverstone in the British GP.

However, Todt achieved his goal of reviving Ferrari by winning the Constructors' Championship for Ferrari in 1999, despite Schumacher's injury. Starting in 2000, Schumacher would win the next five consecutive world championships through 2004, and six straight Constructors' Championships. This was the most dominant a team had ever been in Formula One, and a first in the history of the sport until Mercedes began its run of dominance from 2014 to 2020.

=== CEO and Special Advisor at Ferrari: 2004 to 2009 ===
On 1 June 2004, Todt was appointed CEO of Ferrari in addition to his title of General Manager of the Racing Division. In October 2006, three days after the end of the Formula One season which they had almost won again in a tight battle with Renault and Fernando Alonso, and following the retirement of Michael Schumacher, Todt took up a new post as a Special Advisor for Scuderia Ferrari.

In 2007, Todt prepared the ground for Stefano Domenicali to succeed him as head of the Scuderia on 1 January 2008. Then, on 18 March 2008, he resigned his position as Special Advisor to the Ferrari board, to be replaced by Amedeo Felisa. He nonetheless remained a member of the board of Ferrari for a further year before resigning all his functions within the Italian firm in March 2009.

=== President of FIA ===
In April 2009, Todt became President of "eSafety Aware!" for the promotion of smart vehicles and new safety technologies, which enabled him to improve his knowledge of the internal workings of the FIA.

On 16 July 2009, Todt officially announced his intention of running for the Presidency of the FIA in the election that was due to take place in October. The day before, he had received the support of outgoing President Max Mosley, who had decided not to stand for re-election. He was the second contender to declare, the 1981 world rally champion Ari Vatanen having announced his candidature just a few days earlier.

On 23 October 2009, Todt was elected President of the FIA (for what would become his first term) gaining 135 votes in comparison to Vatanen's 49. He was re-elected, unchallenged, for a second four-year term on 6 December 2013, and was again re-elected, unopposed, for a third four-year term on 8 December 2017. His FIA presidency ended in December 2021, with the 2021 Saudi Arabian Grand Prix being the last race which he would attend as president. He was later succeeded by Mohammed Ben Sulayem.

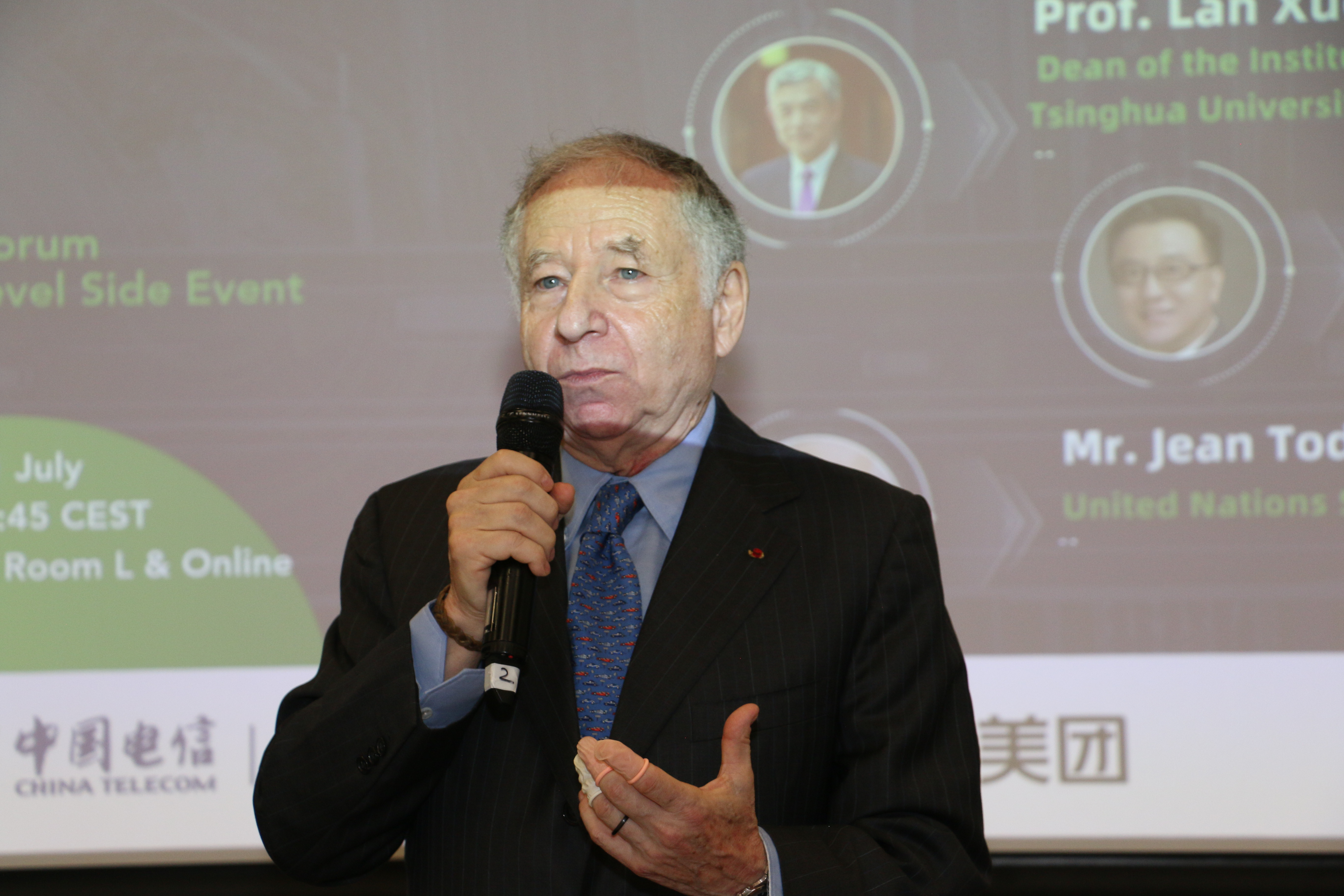
Todt at the 2025 AI for Good Summit in Geneva

=== UN Secretary-General's Special Envoy ===
On 29 April 2015, Secretary-General Ban Ki-moon appointed Todt the United Nations Special Envoy for Road Safety. The new UN Secretary-General António Guterres confirmed him in this role in April 2017.

=== Other activities ===
Todt also devotes his time to several charitable causes. He is one of the founders and the vice-president of the Institut du cerveau et de la moelle épinière (ICM), an institute devoted to medical research for brain and spinal cord disorders, which was set up in 2005. He has been a member of the Board of Trustees of the FIA Foundation for the Automobile and Society since 2009, President of the Board of Directors of the Suu Foundation since December 2014, Tourism Ambassador for Malaysia (2009–2015) and member of the board of directors for the International Peace Institute (IPI) since June 2015. He has been a member of the IOC's Commission for Public Affairs and Social Development through Sport since April 2017.

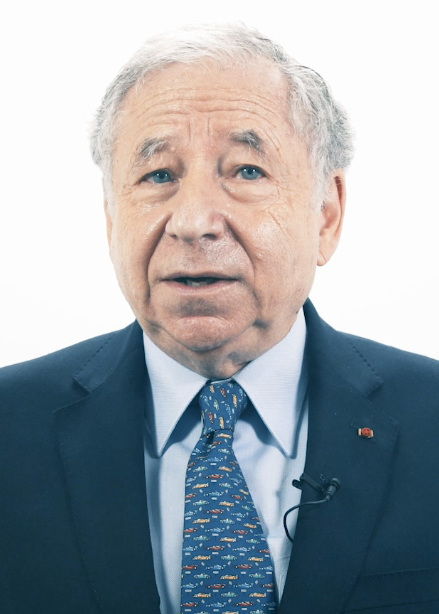
Todt in 2020

Since January 2018, he has been a board member of the Ban Ki-moon Centre for Global Citizens.

He also sits on the boards of Gaumont, the Groupe Lucien Barrière and Edmond de Rothschild SA.

Since 2003, Todt has been an Honorary President of the Federazione Auto Motoristica Sammarinese (FAMS) and Ambassador of the Republic of San Marino.

He is also an honorary member of the Automobile Club de France and of the Polo de Paris.

=== Jeffrey Epstein Association ===
Todt was named in the Epstein files. He is said to have visited Epstein's home in 2017 having been introduced by Terje Rød-Larsen. Rød-Larsen wrote to Epstein: "Think it could be useful for you to meet Jean Todt... Call him and invite him for coffee." Following the meeting, Epstein emailed Eduardo Teodorani, Italian Chamber of Commerce and Industry chairman for the UK, saying that Todt was an "odd guy".

== Trophies and titles ==
=== Trophies ===
==== As co-driver ====
- Lyon-Charbonnières Rally (co-driver): 1968 with Jean-Claude Andruet in Alpine A110 1440
- Grasse-Alpin Rally (co-driver): 1970 with Jean-François Piot in Ford Escort RS 1800
- Tour de France Automobile Rally (co-driver): 1970 with Jean-Pierre Beltoise and Patrick Depailler in Matra MS650
- Rally de Portugal (co-driver): 1971 with Jean-Pierre Nicolas in Alpine A110 in European Championship
- Tour de La Réunion (co-driver): 1972 with Jean-Pierre Nicolas in Renault 12 Gordini
- World Rally Championship (co-driver): Vice-champion of the world 1981 with Guy Fréquelin in Talbot Sunbeam Lotus, allowing the team to win the 1981 manufacturers’ World Championship and the Prix Roland Peugeot of the French Académie des Sports for the outstanding French motorsport achievement of the year.

Fifty-four WRC competitions as co-driver with a total of four victories between 1973 and 1981:

- Winner, Rally of Poland in 1973 (with Achim Warmbold)
- Winner, Österreichische Alpenfahrt in 1973 (with Achim Warmbold)
- Winner, Rallye du Maroc in 1975 (with Hannu Mikkola)
- Winner, Rally Argentina in 1981 (with Guy Fréquelin)
- 2nd in the Rallye du Maroc in 1970 (with Bernard Consten, DS 21)
- 2nd in the Monte-Carlo Rally in 1973 (with Ove Andersson)
- 2nd in the Monte-Carlo Rally in 1975 (with Hannu Mikkola)
- 2nd in the Monte-Carlo Rally in 1981 (with Guy Fréquelin)
- 2nd in the Tour de Corse in 1981 (with Guy Fréquelin)
- 2nd in the Rally of Brazil in 1981 (with Guy Fréquelin)
- 3rd in the Tour de Corse in 1969 (with J-F Piot, on this occasion, not WRC)
- 3rd in the Österreichische Alpenfahrt in 1970 (with J-F Piot, in the ICM International Championship of Manufacturers)
- 3rd in the Monte-Carlo Rally in 1972 (with Rauno Aaltonen)

==== As team principal/director ====
- World Rally Championship (Peugeot Talbot Sport/Peugeot 205 Turbo 16) (2): 1985, 1986 (drivers’ and manufacturers’ title)
- German Rally Championship (2): 1985 (Kalle Grundel), 1986 (Michèle Mouton) (Peugeot 205 Turbo 16)
- Paris-Dakar Rally (Peugeot Talbot Sport) (4): 1987, 1988, 1989, 1990
- Pikes Peak International Hill Climb (PPIHC - the Race to the Clouds) (Peugeot Talbot Sport) (2) : 1988 (Peugeot 405 Turbo 16 driven by A. Vatanen), 1989 (Peugeot 405 Turbo 16 driven by Robby Unser).
- French Rallycross Championship (Peugeot Talbot Sport/Peugeot 205 Turbo 16 Evolution 2) (3): 1988 (Guy Fréquelin), 1989 (Philippe Wambergue) and 1990 (Jean-Manuel Beuzelin)
- Andros Elite Trophy (Peugeot 205 Turbo 16) (1): 1990 (Éric Arpin)
- World Sportscar Championship (Peugeot Talbot Sport/Peugeot 905) (1) : 1992 (drivers’ and manufacturers’ title)
- Le Mans 24 Hours (Peugeot Talbot Sport/Peugeot 905) (2): 1992, 1993
- Formula One World Constructors’ Championship with the Scuderia Ferrari (8): 1999, 2000, 2001, 2002, 2003, 2004, 2007, 2008 (106 Grand Prix wins)
- Formula One World Drivers' Championship with the Scuderia Ferrari (6): 2000, 2001, 2002, 2003, 2004 (Michael Schumacher), 2007 (Kimi Räikkönen)

=== Titles and distinctions ===
Jean Todt has been awarded many titles and distinctions, including:

- Grand Cross of the Legion of Honour (2011)
- Gold Medal of Youth and Sports (1987)
- Laurent Perrier Grand Siècle Award (1987)
- Officer of the National Order of Merit (1991)
- Commander of the Italian Republic (2002)
- Doctor Honoris Causa in Mechanic Engineering at Florence University (2004)
- Dato Seri of Malaysia (2006)
- Member of the Ukrainian Order of Prince Yaroslav the Wise (2011)
- Grand Officer of the Order of Saint Agatha (San Marino) (2012)
- Commander of the National Order of Merit of Senegal (2013)
- Medal of the First Class of the Kingdom of Bahrain, awarded by the King (2014)
- Medal of the Order of Friendship of the Russian Federation (2015)
- Palme d'Or of the International Automobile Festival (2015)
- Humanitarian of the Year Award by the United Nations Association of New York (2016)
- Doctor Honoris Causa by the National Sports Academy of Sofia (2017)
- Medal of the Order of St. George from the SemperOpernball (2019)
- Commander of the Order of Saint Charles of Monaco (2020)

== Management positions ==
- Peugeot Talbot Sport: 1982–1993
- Scuderia Ferrari: 1993–2008
  - General manager of the Ferrari Racing Division from 1993 to 2007
  - CEO of Ferrari from 2004 to 2006
  - Special Advisor at Ferrari from 2006 to 2009
- Fédération Internationale de l'Automobile: 2009–2021

== Personal life ==
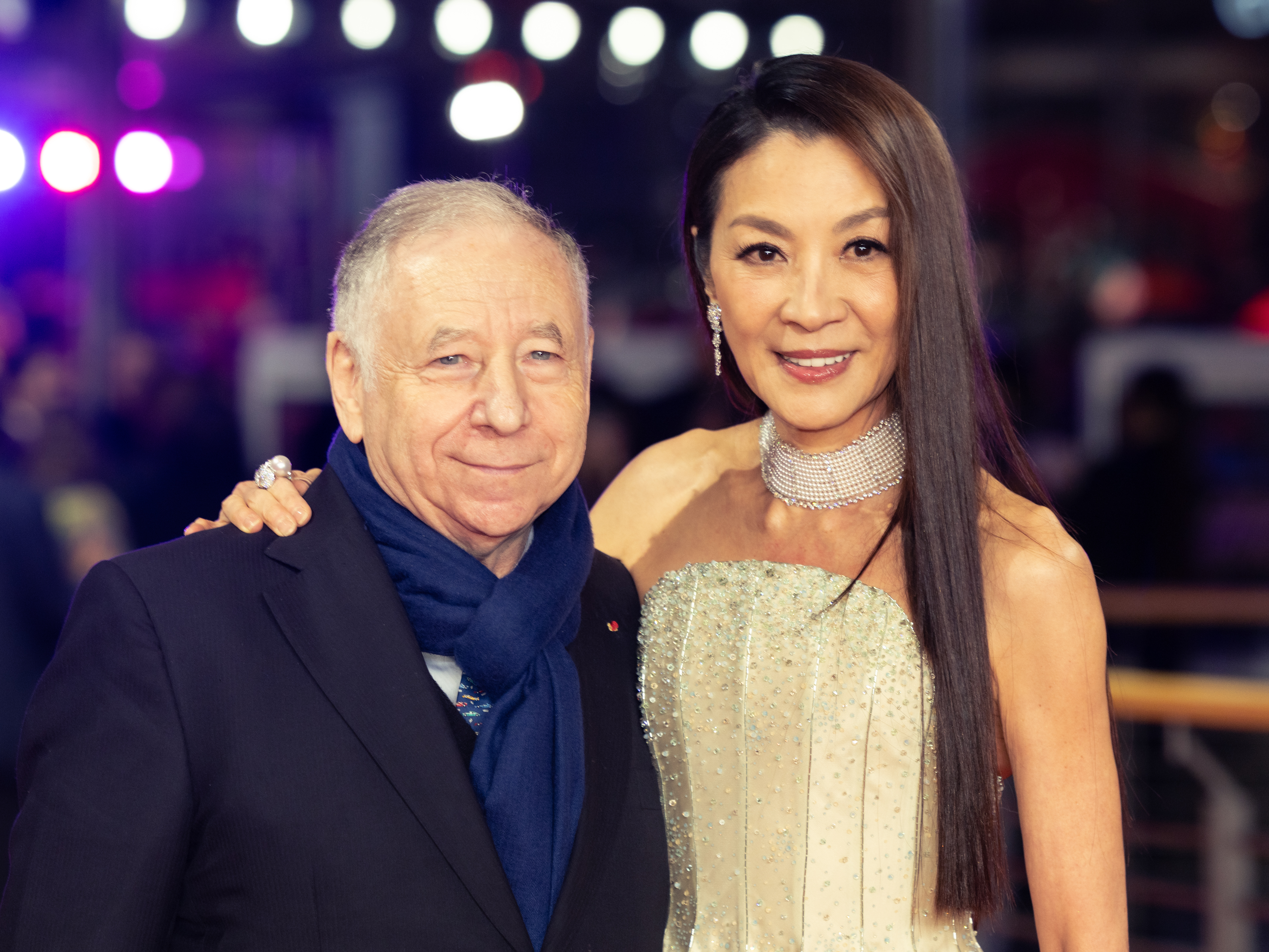
Jean Todt and Michelle Yeoh at the Berlinale 2026

Todt has been in a relationship with Malaysian actress Michelle Yeoh since 2004. In an Instagram post, former Scuderia Ferrari driver Felipe Massa revealed that Yeoh and Todt were married on 27 July 2023 in Geneva. He has a son from his previous marriage, Nicolas Todt, a driver manager and former co-owner of ART Grand Prix.

== See also ==
- Fédération Internationale de l'Automobile
- Formula One
- World Rally Championship
- Paris-Dakar Rally

== Notes and references ==
Sporting positions
Preceded by Max Mosley	President of the Fédération Internationale de l'Automobile; 2009–2021	Succeeded by Mohammed Ben Sulayem
