= Pierrefort =

Commune in Auvergne-Rhône-Alpes, France

- Commune
- Coat of arms
- Location of Pierrefort
- Location within France Location within Auvergne-Rhône-Alpes
- Coordinates: 44°55′21″N 2°50′19″E
- Country: France
- Region: Auvergne-Rhône-Alpes
- Department: Cantal
- Arrondissement: Saint-Flour
- Canton: Saint-Flour-2

Government
  - Mayor (2020–2026): Philippe Mathieu
- Area^{1}: 24.59 km^{2} (9.49 sq mi)
- Highest elevation: 1,400 m (4,600 ft)
- Lowest elevation: 600 m (2,000 ft)
- Population (2023): 868
  - Density: 35.3/km^{2} (91.4/sq mi)
- Time zone: UTC+01:00 (CET)
  - Summer (DST): UTC+02:00 (CEST)
- INSEE/Postal code: 15152 /15230
- ^{1} French Land Register data, which excludes lakes, ponds, glaciers > 1 km^{2} (0.386 sq mi or 247 acres) and river estuaries.

Pierrefort (French pronunciation: [pjɛʁfɔʁ]; Auvergnat: Pèirafòrt) is a commune in the département of Cantal and Auvergne region in south-central France.

It is situated in the south of the département, approximately 100 km south of Clermont-Ferrand and 25 km south-west of Saint-Flour.

== Population ==
Historical population
Year	Pop.	±% p.a.
1968	1,090	—
1975	1,131	+0.53%
1982	1,091	−0.51%
1990	1,017	−0.87%
1999	1,002	−0.16%
2007	921	−1.05%
2012	909	−0.26%
2017	897	−0.27%
2023	868	−0.55%
Source: INSEE

== Climate ==
Pierrefort has cold winters characterised by heavy snowfall whilst summer temperatures often reach 30 °C. Recently the period between May and August has been very dry.

== Economy ==
- Agriculture and breeding (predominantly bovine)
- Craft industry; carpentry, house renovation, garden planning, design and maintenance.
- Service industries supporting summer and winter tourism.

== Notable people ==
- Jean Todt (born 1946), motor sport executive

== See also ==
- Communes of the Cantal department
