= 2004 Rally Japan =

11th round of the 2004 World Rally Championship

2004 Rally Japan Rally Japan 2004
Round 11 of the 2004 World Rally Championship season
← Previous event	Next event →
- Host country: Japan
- Rally base: Obihiro
- Dates run: September 3, 2004 – September 5, 2004
- Stages: 27 (387.50 km; 240.78 miles)
- Stage surface: Gravel, mud
- Overall distance: 1,677.43 km (1,042.31 miles)

Statistics
- Crews: 89 at start, 53 at finish

Overall results
- Overall winner: (Norway) Petter Solberg (United Kingdom) Phil Mills (Japan) 555 Subaru World Rally Team; Subaru Impreza S10 WRC '04

The 2004 Rally Japan (formally the Rally Japan 2004) was the eleventh round of the 2004 World Rally Championship season. The race was held over three days between 3 September and 5 September 2004, and was based in Obihiro, Japan. Subaru's Petter Solberg won the race, his 8th win in the World Rally Championship.

== Background ==
=== Entry list ===
No.	Driver	Co-Driver	Entrant	Car	Tyre
World Rally Championship manufacturer entries
1	(Norway) Petter Solberg	(United Kingdom) Phil Mills	(Japan) 555 Subaru World Rally Team	Subaru Impreza S10 WRC '04	P
2	(Finland) Mikko Hirvonen	(Finland) Jarmo Lehtinen	(Japan) 555 Subaru World Rally Team	Subaru Impreza S10 WRC '04	P
3	(France) Sébastien Loeb	(Monaco) Daniel Elena	(France) Citroën Total WRT	Citroën Xsara WRC	MI
4	(Spain) Carlos Sainz	(Spain) Marc Martí	(France) Citroën Total WRT	Citroën Xsara WRC	MI
5	(Finland) Marcus Grönholm	(Finland) Timo Rautiainen	(France) Marlboro Peugeot Total	Peugeot 307 WRC	MI
6	(Finland) Harri Rovanperä	(Finland) Risto Pietiläinen	(France) Marlboro Peugeot Total	Peugeot 307 WRC	MI
7	(Estonia) Markko Märtin	(United Kingdom) Michael Park	(United Kingdom) Ford Motor Co. Ltd.	Ford Focus RS WRC '04	MI
8	(Belgium) François Duval	(Belgium) Stéphane Prévot	(United Kingdom) Ford Motor Co. Ltd.	Ford Focus RS WRC '04	MI
World Rally Championship entries
11	(Germany) Antony Warmbold	(United Kingdom) Gemma Price	(Germany) Antony Warmbold	Ford Focus RS WRC '02	MI

=== Itinerary ===
All dates and times are JST (UTC+9).

Date	Time	No.	Stage name	Distance
Leg 1 — 150.58 km
3 September	07:38	SS1	Yam Wakka 1	23.26 km
3 September	08:21	SS2	Kunneywa 1	21.56 km
3 September	08:48	SS3	Niueo 1	26.57 km
3 September	09:45	SS4	Rikubetsu 1	2.80 km
3 September	14:56	SS5	Yam Wakka 2	23.26 km
3 September	14:39	SS6	Kunneywa 2	21.56 km
3 September	16:06	SS7	Niueo 2	26.57 km
3 September	17:03	SS8	Rikubetsu 2	2.80 km
3 September	19:26	SS9	Satsunai 1	2.20 km
Leg 2 — 124.98 km
4 September	07:28	SS10	Pawse Kamuy 1	7.89 km
4 September	08:01	SS11	Nupri Pake 1	13.90 km
4 September	08:48	SS12	Rikubetsu 3	2.80 km
4 September	09:15	SS13	Kimun Kamuy 1	26.03 km
4 September	09:44	SS14	Cup Kamuy 1	10.77 km
4 September	14:30	SS15	Pawse Kamuy 2	7.89 km
4 September	15:03	SS16	Nupri Pake 2	13.90 km
4 September	15:50	SS17	Rikubetsu 4	2.80 km
4 September	16:17	SS18	Kimun Kamuy 2	26.03 km
4 September	16:46	SS19	Cup Kamuy 2	10.77 km
4 September	19:14	SS20	Satsunai 2	2.20 km
Leg 3 — 98.38 km
5 September	07:38	SS21	Rerakamuy 1	8.76 km
5 September	08:03	SS22	Panke Nikorpet 1	17.04 km
5 September	08:33	SS23	Penke 1	29.07 km
5 September	10:14	SS24	Satsunai 3	2.20 km
5 September	12:52	SS25	Rerakamuy 2	8.76 km
5 September	13:17	SS26	Panke Nikorpet 2	17.04 km
5 September	13:47	SS27	Penke 2	29.07 km

== Results ==
=== Overall ===
Pos.	No.	Driver	Co-driver	Team	Car	Time	Difference	Points
1	1	(Norway) Petter Solberg	(United Kingdom) Phil Mills	(Japan) 555 Subaru World Rally Team	Subaru Impreza S10 WRC '04	3:43:50.6		10
2	3	(France) Sébastien Loeb	(Monaco) Daniel Elena	(France) Citroën Total WRT	Citroën Xsara WRC	3:45:03.9	+1:13.3	8
3	7	(Estonia) Markko Märtin	(United Kingdom) Michael Park	(United Kingdom) Ford Motor Co. Ltd.	Ford Focus RS WRC '04	3:45:33.9	+1:43.3	6
4	5	(Finland) Marcus Grönholm	(Finland) Timo Rautiainen	(France) Marlboro Peugeot Total	Peugeot 307 WRC	3:46:08.5	+2:17.9	5
5	4	(Spain) Carlos Sainz	(Spain) Marc Martí	(France) Citroën Total WRT	Citroën Xsara WRC	3:46:21.6	+2:31.0	4
6	6	(Finland) Harri Rovanperä	(Finland) Risto Pietiläinen	(France) Marlboro Peugeot Total	Peugeot 307 WRC	3:51:16.8	+7:26.2	3
7	2	(Finland) Mikko Hirvonen	(Finland) Jarmo Lehtinen	(Japan) 555 Subaru World Rally Team	Subaru Impreza S10 WRC '04	3:52:57.1	+9:06.5	2
8	11	(Germany) Antony Warmbold	(United Kingdom) Gemma Price	(Germany) Antony Warmbold	Ford Focus RS WRC '02	4:02:05.3	+18:14.7	1

=== World Rally Cars ===
==== Classification ====
Position		No.	Driver	Co-driver	Entrant	Car	Time	Difference	Points
Event	Class	No.	Driver	Co-driver	Entrant	Car	Time	Difference	Points
1	1	1	(Norway) Petter Solberg	(United Kingdom) Phil Mills	(Japan) 555 Subaru World Rally Team	Subaru Impreza S10 WRC '04	3:43:50.6		10
2	2	3	(France) Sébastien Loeb	(Monaco) Daniel Elena	(France) Citroën Total WRT	Citroën Xsara WRC	3:45:03.9	+1:13.3	8
3	3	7	(Estonia) Markko Märtin	(United Kingdom) Michael Park	(United Kingdom) Ford Motor Co. Ltd.	Ford Focus RS WRC '04	3:45:33.9	+1:43.3	6
4	4	5	(Finland) Marcus Grönholm	(Finland) Timo Rautiainen	(France) Marlboro Peugeot Total	Peugeot 307 WRC	3:46:08.5	+2:17.9	5
5	5	4	(Spain) Carlos Sainz	(Spain) Marc Martí	(France) Citroën Total WRT	Citroën Xsara WRC	3:46:21.6	+2:31.0	4
6	6	6	(Finland) Harri Rovanperä	(Finland) Risto Pietiläinen	(France) Marlboro Peugeot Total	Peugeot 307 WRC	3:51:16.8	+7:26.2	3
7	7	2	(Finland) Mikko Hirvonen	(Finland) Jarmo Lehtinen	(Japan) 555 Subaru World Rally Team	Subaru Impreza S10 WRC '04	3:52:57.1	+9:06.5	2
Retired SS22		8	(Belgium) François Duval	(Belgium) Stéphane Prévot	(United Kingdom) Ford Motor Co. Ltd.	Ford Focus RS WRC '04	Accident		0

==== Special stages ====
Day	Stage	Stage name	Length	Winner	Car	Time	Class leaders
Leg 1 (3 Sep)	SS1	Yam Wakka 1	23.26 km	(Norway) Petter Solberg	Subaru Impreza S10 WRC '04	15:03.5	(Norway) Petter Solberg
Leg 1 (3 Sep)	SS2	Kunneywa 1	21.56 km	(Norway) Petter Solberg	Subaru Impreza S10 WRC '04	12:11.5	(Norway) Petter Solberg
Leg 1 (3 Sep)	SS3	Niueo 1	26.57 km	(France) Sébastien Loeb	Citroën Xsara WRC	15:28.3	(Norway) Petter Solberg
Leg 1 (3 Sep)	SS4	Rikubetsu 1	2.80 km	(Norway) Petter Solberg	Subaru Impreza S10 WRC '04	2:13.0	(Norway) Petter Solberg
Leg 1 (3 Sep)	SS5	Yam Wakka 2	23.26 km	(France) Sébastien Loeb	Citroën Xsara WRC	14:46.6	(Norway) Petter Solberg
Leg 1 (3 Sep)	SS6	Kunneywa 2	21.56 km	(France) Sébastien Loeb	Citroën Xsara WRC	11:54.0	(Norway) Petter Solberg
Leg 1 (3 Sep)	SS7	Niueo 2	26.57 km	(France) Sébastien Loeb	Citroën Xsara WRC	14:57.0	(Norway) Petter Solberg
Leg 1 (3 Sep)	SS8	Rikubetsu 2	2.80 km	(Norway) Petter Solberg	Subaru Impreza S10 WRC '04	2:14.2	(Norway) Petter Solberg
Leg 1 (3 Sep)	SS9	Satsunai 1	2.20 km	(Spain) Carlos Sainz	Citroën Xsara WRC	1:34.2	(Norway) Petter Solberg
Leg 2 (4 Sep)	SS10	Pawse Kamuy 1	7.89 km	(Norway) Petter Solberg	Subaru Impreza S10 WRC '04	4:12.4	(Norway) Petter Solberg
Leg 2 (4 Sep)	SS11	Nupri Pake 1	13.90 km	(Norway) Petter Solberg	Subaru Impreza S10 WRC '04	7:11.5	(Norway) Petter Solberg
Leg 2 (4 Sep)	SS12	Rikubetsu 3	2.80 km	(Norway) Petter Solberg	Subaru Impreza S10 WRC '04	2:10.5	(Norway) Petter Solberg
Leg 2 (4 Sep)	SS13	Kimun Kamuy 1	26.03 km	(Norway) Petter Solberg	Subaru Impreza S10 WRC '04	14:08.5	(Norway) Petter Solberg
Leg 2 (4 Sep)	SS14	Cup Kamuy 1	10.77 km	(Norway) Petter Solberg	Subaru Impreza S10 WRC '04	5:47.0	(Norway) Petter Solberg
Leg 2 (4 Sep)	SS15	Pawse Kamuy 2	7.89 km	(Finland) Marcus Grönholm	Peugeot 307 WRC	4:04.4	(Norway) Petter Solberg
Leg 2 (4 Sep)	SS16	Nupri Pake 2	13.90 km	(Norway) Petter Solberg	Subaru Impreza S10 WRC '04	7:02.2	(Norway) Petter Solberg
Leg 2 (4 Sep)	SS17	Rikubetsu 4	2.80 km	(Belgium) François Duval	Ford Focus RS WRC '04	2:12.2	(Norway) Petter Solberg
Leg 2 (4 Sep)	SS18	Kimun Kamuy 2	26.03 km	(Norway) Petter Solberg	Subaru Impreza S10 WRC '04	13:50.8	(Norway) Petter Solberg
Leg 2 (4 Sep)	SS19	Cup Kamuy 2	10.77 km	(Spain) Carlos Sainz	Citroën Xsara WRC	5:37.4	(Norway) Petter Solberg
Leg 2 (4 Sep)	SS20	Satsunai 2	2.20 km	(Spain) Carlos Sainz	Citroën Xsara WRC	1:34.1	(Norway) Petter Solberg
Leg 3 (5 Sep)	SS21	Rerakamuy 1	8.76 km	(France) Sébastien Loeb	Citroën Xsara WRC	5:17.5	(Norway) Petter Solberg
Leg 3 (5 Sep)	SS22	Panke Nikorpet 1	17.04 km	(France) Sébastien Loeb	Citroën Xsara WRC	9:38.3	(Norway) Petter Solberg
Leg 3 (5 Sep)	SS23	Penke 1	29.07 km	(Estonia) Markko Märtin	Ford Focus RS WRC '04	17:13.4	(Norway) Petter Solberg
Leg 3 (5 Sep)	SS24	Satsunai 3	2.20 km	(Estonia) Markko Märtin	Ford Focus RS WRC '04	1:32.4	(Norway) Petter Solberg
Leg 3 (5 Sep)	SS25	Rerakamuy 2	8.76 km	(Finland) Marcus Grönholm	Peugeot 307 WRC	5:10.5	(Norway) Petter Solberg
Leg 3 (5 Sep)	SS26	Panke Nikorpet 2	17.04 km	(Finland) Marcus Grönholm	Peugeot 307 WRC	9:31.0	(Norway) Petter Solberg
Leg 3 (5 Sep)	SS27	Penke 2	29.07 km	(Finland) Marcus Grönholm (Estonia) Markko Märtin	Peugeot 307 WRC; Ford Focus RS WRC '04	16:43.4	(Norway) Petter Solberg

==== Championship standings ====
Pos.	Drivers' championships			Co-drivers' championships			Manufacturers' championships		
Pos.	Move	Driver	Points	Move	Co-driver	Points	Move	Manufacturer	Points
1		(France) Sébastien Loeb	84		(Monaco) Daniel Elena	84		(France) Citroën Total WRT	137
2	2	(Norway) Petter Solberg	54	2	(United Kingdom) Phil Mills	54		(United Kingdom) Ford Motor Co. Ltd.	102
3	1	(Estonia) Markko Märtin	53	1	(United Kingdom) Michael Park	53		(Japan) 555 Subaru World Rally Team	79
4	1	(Spain) Carlos Sainz	50	1	(Spain) Marc Martí	50		(France) Marlboro Peugeot Total	73
5		(Finland) Marcus Grönholm	47		(Finland) Timo Rautiainen	47		(Japan) Mitsubishi Motors	17
