= Institut Supérieur de Marketing du Luxe (Sup de Luxe) =

Luxury Management school

Sup de Luxe
- Institut Supérieur de Marketing du Luxe
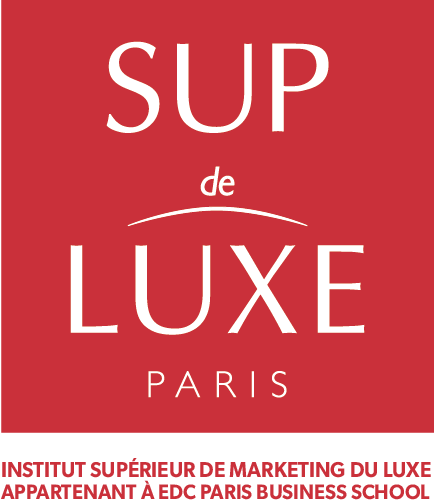
- Motto: Le luxe, une passion, un métier, un réseau
- Type: Institut des Métiers des Entreprises du Luxe
- Established: 1990
- President: Michel Guten
- Director: Thibaut de La Rivière
- Academic staff: 70
- Students: 100
- Location: Paris, France
- Language: French, English
- Website: http://www.supdeluxe.com/fr/accueil

The Institut Superieur de Marketing du Luxe, also known as Sup de Luxe, is an institute that provides luxury management programs from bachelor's to MBAs. Sup de Luxe is part of the EDC Paris Business School. The institute is a "chair Cartier" and was created by professionals working in the luxury goods sector. The institute's goal is to prepare graduates for employment and careers in the luxury sector. Since its creation in 1990, more than 3,000 international students have graduated.

== History ==
The institute was created in collaboration by Cartier.

The Institut Supérieur de Marketing du Luxe was founded by Alain-Dominique Perrin, in collaboration with Cartier in 1990. By creating the Institut Supérieur de Marketing du Luxe, Cartier first trained a large number of its managers and then offered other brands creative profiles with the values of the sector.

Sup de luxe was the first educational institute in France specialising in luxury management, its creations motivated by the absence of such institutions. Its initial aim was to produce young managers and experts in the luxury field and to stimulate research into luxury on a global scale.

Sup de Luxe is a subdivision of the school mayor EDC Paris Business School acquired by the Planeta group in 2017. Sup de Luxe is not recognized as a business school. As a result, an RNCP title diploma is issued in agreement with the ministry.

Sup de Luxe is currently based at the La Villette Campus in Paris' 19th Arrdondissement.

== Rankings ==
In 2022, Sup de Luxe was ranked only 4th on 25 in Luxury Management programs in France. The MSc-Master of Science Global Luxury Brand Management is ranked 19 on 24 in France. According to Eduniversal Best Masters Ranking, in 2013-2014 the Luxury Brand Marketing and International Management MBA of the Institut Supérieur de Marketing du Luxe was ranked number 9 in the world for Masters in the sectors of luxury management and fashion.

== MBA programs ==
=== MBA Luxury Brand Marketing and International Management ===
This MBA is a Le Figaro Chair. It is requires the equivalent to a bachelor's degree or with at least three years of professional experience. Professionals from the luxury sector conceive and teach this program to train future luxury managers. The program allows the students to understand how luxury firms function. The students also get the opportunity to do business assignments for luxury firms and therefore practice their theoretical knowledge.

==== Admission ====
The specialized MBA is open to French or international students with a bachelor's degree in any previous field of education, or an equivalent, and to young professionals interested in specializing themselves in the luxury and planning department or creating their own enterprise in this domain. Sup de luxe accepts 100 students from around the world each year.

=== MBA Global Luxury Brand Management ===
In October 2014, for its 25th anniversary, Sup de Luxe launched a new MBA in "Global Luxury Brand Management". It is taught in Paris, fully in English. It targeted foreign students (of Bachelors, Masters or equivalent degree) or people with business experience. This one-year program offers students an overall approach of the Luxury Industry: General Management, but also commercial practices (site practice, Finance, Logistics and supply chain, etc.).

==== Admission ====
This Sup de Luxe program is designed for graduate students with the appropriate academic profile (Bachelor, Master, or Engineering Programs) and for graduates with at least 3 years of business experience. If a candidate doesn't have proof of a native English level, a TOEFL, TOEIC or CPE test is required.

=== MBA Online Luxury Management in the Digital Age ===
The MBA Online aims to train professionals so that they may provide a vision of change and adaptation to the new socioeconomic environment within companies in the luxury sector. This program is aimed at managers, professionals and executives in the luxury sector who wish to acquire a new vision of management oriented towards the digital environment of business. It endeavors to offer companies of this sector an added value for their innovation and entrepreneurship capacity, international vision, management in social networks, knowledge of the keys to digital marketing and e-commerce and understanding of the characteristics of the luxury sector.

== Main speakers ==
Subject areas and speakers

- History and general culture of history: Stéphane Borraz, PhD candidate with the IAE in Paris.
- The geopolitics of luxury: Nicolas Boulanger, a graduate of the Institut d’Études Politiques of Strasbourg and of the Institut Supérieur de Marketing du Luxe.
- Marketing and merchandising: Jean-Pierre Richard, a HEC graduate; Michaela MERK, a PhD graduate in management sciences from the Sorbonne (Paris).
- International markets: Alain Viot, an ESSEC graduate (1985) and previously of the marketing department of Cartier.
- Business strategy: Jean BERG is the senior vice-president of an international consultancy agency for business strategy called ESTIN & CO,. Berg has experience in the luxury and the fashion field.
- Trend analysis : Catherine Champeyrol, an EDHEC and Sup de Luxe graduate (1987).

== Board of trustees ==
=== Alain-Dominique Perrin ===
At the beginning of 1999, he took over the leadership of the Richemont Group, the second largest luxury goods group in the world, specializing in jewelry, watch-making and accessories through 19 international brands (Cartier (jeweler), Vacheron Constantin, Van Cleef & Arpels, James Purdey & Sons, Baume et Mercier, Jaeger-LeCoultre, A. Lange & Söhne, Officine Panerai, IWC (International Watch Company), Piaget SA, Montblanc (company), Chloé, Shanghai Tang, Lancel, Dunhill, Azzedine Alaïa, Roger Dubuis, Net-a-Porter, Peter Millar).

Alain Dominique Perrin is an emblematic figure in the luxury goods world and is renowned for his role in Cartier's renaissance and international development. He is the president of Cartier and founder of the Fondation Cartier pour l'Art Contemporain (361, BVD Raspail, Paris 14).

He was the first to define “modern luxury”. Having developed a whole range of “Must de Cartier” items, he was also a pioneer in the fight against counterfeit goods.

In 2003, he became executive director of Compagnie Financière Richemont. He also presides over the fortunes of the Cartier Foundation for Contemporary Art.

In 2004, the Minister for Culture appointed him President of the Public Establishment of the Jeu de Paume, dedicated to art and photography. He is also a member of the International Board of the Tate Gallery (London).

Father of five, Alain Dominique Perrin, is a Commander of the Legion of Honour, Commander of the National Order of Merit (France), Commander of Arts and letters and Officer of the Order of Agricultural Merit.

=== Michel Guten ===
Michel Guten began his career at Silver Match, where he became chairman and CEO in 1977. Then he joined the House of Cartier, where he escalated all levels. Building the set-up of shops from 1981 to 1987, he became the General Manager for France and Director of Cartier International. Ultimately, he became Vice President of the brand. He still remains a member of the supervisory board of Cartier.

Michel Guten became President of "Sup de Luxe" in 1990, a course designed as a postgraduate specialization for young professionals. He said that this unique structure was born from the observation that instead of forming people for the enterprise, it's better to adapt them with an initial formation specific to the luxury world.

Following this success he launched "Sup Taste" and "Sup Retail", the latter being dedicated to training sales trainees. In parallel, he assumed senior positions: Montaigne Committee, or at the head of Lancel. He was also vice-chair of the Champs Elysees in 2004. Michel Guten is an Officer of the Legion of Honour.

=== Thibaut de La Rivière ===
La Rivière was a history of arts graduate and a jewelry and goldsmith plate specialist who started his career as an auctioneer. At the age of 22, Thibaut de La Rivière was invited to manage his previous secondary institute. From secondary to business institute and higher education, La Rivière has been part the creation of many institutions linked to the business world. One of his most prestigious innovations is the 'Stylisme de mode BTS'.

Thibaut, being the director of several learning institutes, in 1990, he decided to make his way back to the lux and art domains. After an influential meeting with Alain Dominique Perrin and Michel Guten, he contributed to EDC Paris' revival (Previously known as 'Écoles des cadres') and became sup de luxes' dean in 1995.

He developed the institute to what it became today. To recognize his contributions, he earned many awards. Nowadays, La Riviere is commander in Malts' order and counselor in communication for the 'Saint Siège'

== Alumni Sup de Luxe ==
Alumni Sup de Luxe is an association regrouping all the graduates from the Institut Superieur de Marketing du Luxe for the past 24 years. Its main aim is to help the graduates, now active in the luxury sector, organise reunions to federate them, therefore emphasizing their diplomas. Alumni Sup de Luxe is an international network of 1500 professionals who graduated from the institute. Encompassing more than 30 nationalities, it is culturally diverse. Approximately 80% of the graduates have been hired in the luxury sector and more than 25% live abroad (Middle East, USA, SA, Asia). The goal of the association is to organize numerous events throughout the year to highlight talents and follow the senior and junior graduates. The association aims for interactions between the graduates and main actors in the luxury sector. Alumni Sup de Luxe is in constant aid to the graduates, not only creating events, but also through reunions between professionals and graduates, and massive advertising through social networks and magazines, and annuaries.
