= 2012 Intercontinental Rally Challenge =

Seasons
- ← 2011 2013 (ERC) →

The 2012 Intercontinental Rally Challenge was the seventh and final season of the Intercontinental Rally Challenge. The season again consisted of thirteen rounds and started on 23 February with the Rallye Açores. The season ended on 3 November, at the Cyprus Rally. The season was marred by the death of Garth “Jaffa” Roberts, co-driver to Craig Breen, on stage eight of the Targa Florio Rally.

== Calendar ==
Rd.	Start date	Finish date	Rally	Rally headquarters	Surface	Stages	Distance
1	23 February	25 February	(Portugal) 47th SATA Rallye Açores	Ponta Delgada, Azores	Gravel	14	177.56 km
2	15 March	17 March	(Spain) 36th Rally Islas Canarias - El Corte Inglés	Las Palmas, Gran Canaria	Asphalt	15	240.92 km
3	6 April	7 April	(United Kingdom) 71st Circuit of Ireland Rally	Armagh, Northern Ireland	Asphalt	15	221.47 km
4	10 May	12 May	(France) 55th Tour de Corse	Ajaccio, Corsica	Asphalt	14	318.23 km
C	2 June	3 June	(Hungary) 46th Mecsek Rallye	Pécs, Baranya	Asphalt	??	??
5	14 June	16 June	(Italy) 96th Targa Florio - Rally Internazionale di Sicilia	Palermo, Sicily	Asphalt	11	151.95 km
6	21 June	23 June	48th Belgium Geko Ypres Rally	Ypres, West Flanders	Asphalt	18	287.66 km
7	6 July	7 July	40th San Marino Rally	San Marino	Gravel	13	190.30 km
8	19 July	21 July	12th Sibiu Rally Romania	Sibiu, Sibiu County	Gravel	12	200.20 km
9	31 August	2 September	(Czech Republic) 42nd Barum Rally Zlín	Zlín, Zlín Region	Asphalt	15	251.62 km
10	14 September	16 September	(Ukraine) 14th Prime Yalta Rally	Yalta, Crimea	Asphalt	14	261.87 km
11	28 September	30 September	(Bulgaria) 32nd Mabanol Rally Sliven	Sliven	Asphalt	13	197.32 km
12	11 October	13 October	(Italy) 54th Rallye Sanremo	Sanremo, Liguria	Asphalt	10	204.00 km
13	2 November	4 November	41st Cyprus Rally	Paphos	Mixed	13	239.14 km

The calendar consisted of thirteen events run in Europe. The schedule included five new events, which were held in Sicily, Bulgaria, Ireland, Romania and San Marino. The Mecsek Rally in Hungary was dropped due to financial reasons and was replaced by the Targa Florio.

== Selected entries ==
Constructor	Car	Entrant	Driver	Co-driver	Rounds
Škoda	Škoda Fabia S2000	(Czech Republic) Škoda Motorsport	(Finland) Juho Hänninen	(Finland) Mikko Markkula	1, 3, 6, 9, 12
Škoda	Škoda Fabia S2000	(Czech Republic) Škoda Motorsport	(Czech Republic) Jan Kopecký	(Czech Republic) Pavel Dresler	2–6, 9, 12
Škoda	Škoda Fabia S2000	(United Kingdom) Škoda UK	(Norway) Andreas Mikkelsen	(Norway) Ola Fløene	1–9, 13
Škoda	Škoda Fabia S2000	(Austria) Red Bull Team	(Germany) Hermann Gassner	(Germany) Klaus Wicha	1–2, 4
Škoda	Škoda Fabia S2000	(Germany) Škoda Auto Deutschland	(Germany) Sepp Wiegand	(Germany) Timo Gottschalk	1–9, 13
Škoda	Škoda Fabia S2000	(United Arab Emirates) Skydive Dubai Rally Team	(United Arab Emirates) Rashid Al Ketbi	(United Arab Emirates) Khalid Al Kendi	1–2, 4–6
Škoda	Škoda Fabia S2000	(Spain) AMP Classic Team	(Spain) Alberto Hevia	(Spain) Alberto Igresias	2
Škoda	Škoda Fabia S2000	(Hungary) Eurosol Racing Team	(Hungary) János Puskádi	(Hungary) Barnabás Gódor	2, 7, 12
Škoda	Škoda Fabia S2000	(Hungary) Eurosol Racing Team	(Hungary) László Vizin	(Hungary) Gábor Zsiros	6, 10, 13
Škoda	Škoda Fabia S2000	(Republic of Ireland) Škoda Ireland	(Republic of Ireland) Robert Barrable	(Republic of Ireland) Damien Connolly	3
Škoda	Škoda Fabia S2000	(Republic of Ireland) Škoda Ireland	(Republic of Ireland) Robert Barrable	(United Kingdom) Stuart Loudon	6, 9
Škoda	Škoda Fabia S2000	(Italy) S.A. Motorsport Italia SRL	(Italy) Umberto Scandola	(Italy) Guido D'Amore	5, 7, 12
Škoda	Škoda Fabia S2000	(Netherlands) Wevers Sport	(Belgium) Pieter Tsjoen	(Belgium) Eddy Chevaillier	6
Škoda	Škoda Fabia S2000	(Romania) Napoca Rally Academy	(Italy) Marco Tempestini	(Romania) Dorin Pulpea	8
Škoda	Škoda Fabia S2000	(Romania) Jack Daniel's Rally Team	(Hungary) Gergely Szabó	(Romania) Károly Borbély	8
Škoda	Škoda Fabia S2000	(Romania) Škoda România Motorsport	(Romania) Dan Gîrtofan	(Romania) Adrian Berghea	8
Škoda	Škoda Fabia S2000	(Czech Republic) Adell Mogul Racing Team	(Czech Republic) Roman Kresta	(Czech Republic) Petr Gross	9
Škoda	Škoda Fabia S2000	(Estonia) ME3 Rally Team	(Estonia) Karl Kruuda	(Estonia) Martin Järveoja	9
Škoda	Škoda Fabia S2000	(Czech Republic) AK Rallysport Brno	(Czech Republic) Jaromír Tarabus	(Czech Republic) Daniel Trunkát	9
Škoda	Škoda Fabia S2000	(Slovakia) Rufa Sport	(Czech Republic) Tomáš Kostka	(Czech Republic) Miroslav Houšť	9
Škoda	Škoda Fabia S2000	(Czech Republic) Surfin	(Czech Republic) Emil Triner	(Czech Republic) Petr Machů	9
Škoda	Škoda Fabia S2000	(Bulgaria) Vivacom Rally Team	(Bulgaria) Dimitar Iliev	(Bulgaria) Yanaki Yanakiev	11
Peugeot	Peugeot 207 S2000	(Italy) Delta Rally	(France) Bryan Bouffier	(France) Xavier Panseri	1, 4
Peugeot	Peugeot 207 S2000	(Italy) Delta Rally	(Portugal) Bruno Magalhães	(Portugal) Carlos Magalhães	1
Peugeot	Peugeot 207 S2000	(Italy) Delta Rally	(Portugal) Bruno Magalhães	(Portugal) Nuno Rodrigues da Silva	12
Peugeot	Peugeot 207 S2000	(Italy) Delta Rally	(France) Jean-Marc Manzagol	(France) Etienne Patrone	4
Peugeot	Peugeot 207 S2000	(Spain) AMP Classic Team	(Spain) Jonathan Pérez	(Spain) Enrique Velasco	2
Peugeot	Peugeot 207 S2000	(Spain) Canarias Sport Club	(Spain) Luis Monzón	(Spain) Jose Carlos Deniz	2
Peugeot	Peugeot 207 S2000	(France) Saintéloc Racing	(Republic of Ireland) Craig Breen	(United Kingdom) Gareth Roberts	3–4
Peugeot	Peugeot 207 S2000	(France) Saintéloc Racing	(Republic of Ireland) Craig Breen	(Republic of Ireland) Paul Nagle	12
Peugeot	Peugeot 207 S2000	(France) Saintéloc Racing	(France) Mathieu Arzeno	(Belgium) Renaud Jamoul	3–4, 8
Peugeot	Peugeot 207 S2000	(France) Saintéloc Racing	(France) Jean-Mathieu Leandri	(France) Pierre-Marien Leonardi	4
Peugeot	Peugeot 207 S2000	(France) Saintéloc Racing	(Switzerland) Florian Gonon	(Switzerland) Sandra Arlettaz	6, 9, 12
Peugeot	Peugeot 207 S2000	(France) Saintéloc Racing	(Switzerland) Michaël Burri	(Switzerland) Stéphane Rey	8
Peugeot	Peugeot 207 S2000	(Italy) Munaretto Sport	(France) Pierre Campana	(France) Sabrina de Castelli	4
Peugeot	Peugeot 207 S2000	(Italy) Munaretto Sport	(France) François Delecour	(France) Dominique Savignoni	8
Peugeot	Peugeot 207 S2000	(Italy) F.P.F. Sport SRL	(Italy) Paolo Andreucci	(Italy) Anna Andreussi	5, 12
Peugeot	Peugeot 207 S2000	(Italy) Casarano Racing	(Italy) Matteo Gamba	(Italy) Emanuele Inglesi	5
Peugeot	Peugeot 207 S2000	(Italy) United Rally Management	(Italy) Alessandro Perico	(Italy) Fabrizio Carrara	5, 12
Peugeot	Peugeot 207 S2000	(Italy) HRT Motorsport	(Republic of Ireland) Craig Breen	(United Kingdom) Gareth Roberts	5
Peugeot	Peugeot 207 S2000	(Belgium) Autostal Duindistel	(Belgium) Freddy Loix	(Belgium) Lara Vanneste	6
Peugeot	Peugeot 207 S2000	(Poland) Synthos Cersanit Rally Team	(Poland) Michał Sołowow	(Poland) Maciek Baran	6, 9
Peugeot	Peugeot 207 S2000	(Belgium) Autostal Atrantic	(Belgium) Mathias Viaene	(Belgium) Pieter Vyncke	6
Peugeot	Peugeot 207 S2000	(Belgium) Autostal Atrantic	(Belgium) Jonas Langenakens	(Belgium) Nico Beernaert	6
Peugeot	Peugeot 207 S2000	(Belgium) Autostal Atrantic	(Belgium) Philip Cracco	(Belgium) Geert Demuynck	6
Peugeot	Peugeot 207 S2000	Peugeot Sport France	(France) Germain Bonnefis	(France) Olivier Fournier	7
Peugeot	Peugeot 207 S2000	(Czech Republic) Peugeot Delimax Total Team	(Czech Republic) Pavel Valoušek	(Czech Republic) Lukáš Kostka	9
Peugeot	Peugeot 207 S2000	(Ukraine) 77 Rally Team	(Ukraine) Yukhym Vazheyevskyy	(Ukraine) Yevgen Kochkovoyi	10
Peugeot	Peugeot 207 S2000	(Bulgaria) ASC Prestige	(Bulgaria) Petar Gyoshev	(Bulgaria) Dimitar Spasov	11
Peugeot	Peugeot 207 S2000	(Bulgaria) Globul Rally Team	(Bulgaria) Krum Donchev	(Bulgaria) Petar Yordanov	11
Peugeot	Peugeot 207 S2000	(Italy) Power Car Team	(France) Pierre Campana	(France) Sabrina de Castelli	12
Peugeot	Peugeot 207 S2000	(Italy) Peugeot Sport Italia	(Italy) Stefano Albertini	(Italy) Simone Scattolin	12
Peugeot	Peugeot 207 S2000	(Belgium) Kronos Racing	(United Kingdom) Harry Hunt	(Australia) Dale Moscatt	12
Ralliart	Mitsubishi Lancer Evo IX	(Portugal) Team Além Mar	(Portugal) Ricardo Moura	(Portugal) Sancho Eiró	1
Ralliart	Mitsubishi Lancer Evo IX	(Portugal) Team Além Mar	(Portugal) Ricardo Moura	(Portugal) António Costa	2
Ralliart	Mitsubishi Lancer Evo IX	(Portugal) Team Além Mar	(Portugal) Ricardo Carmo	(Portugal) Jorge Diniz	1
Ralliart	Mitsubishi Lancer Evo IX	(Portugal) Team Além Mar	(Portugal) Luís Miguel Rego	(Portugal) Pedro Rodrigues	1
Ralliart	Mitsubishi Lancer Evo IX	(United Kingdom) Jennings Motorsport	(United Kingdom) Garry Jennings	(Republic of Ireland) Barry McNulty	3
Ralliart	Mitsubishi Lancer Evo IX	(Romania) Napoca Rally Academy	(Romania) Bogdan Marișca	(Romania) Sebastian Itu	8
Ralliart	Mitsubishi Lancer Evo IX	(Ukraine) Mentos Ascania Racing	(Ukraine) Valeriy Gorban	(Ukraine) Andriy Nikolaiev	10
Ralliart	Mitsubishi Lancer Evo X	(Italy) Rally Project	(Italy) Max Rendina	(Italy) Mario Pizzuti	5, 12
Ralliart	Mitsubishi Lancer Evo X	Dream Team Ukraine	(Ukraine) Vitaliy Pushkar	(Ukraine) Ivan Mishyn	5–6, 8, 13
Ralliart	Mitsubishi Lancer Evo X	(Romania) Colina Motorsport	(Romania) Edwin Keleti	(Romania) Botond Csomortáni	8
Ralliart	Mitsubishi Lancer Evo X R4	(Netherlands) Heuvel Motorsport	(Netherlands) Jasper van den Heuvel	(Belgium) Kris Botson	6
Ralliart	Mitsubishi Lancer Evo X R4	(Romania) Colina Motorsport	(Romania) Valentin Porcișteanu	(Romania) Dan Dobre	8
Ralliart	Mitsubishi Lancer Evo X R4	(Ukraine) Odesa Rally Team	(Ukraine) Vitaliy Pushkar	(Ukraine) Ivan Mishyn	10, 12
Ralliart	Mitsubishi Lancer Evo IX R4	(Italy) Island Motorsport	(Italy) Marco Cavigioli	(Italy) Monica Fortunato	9–10, 12
Ford	Ford Fiesta S2000	Dream Team Ukraine	(Ukraine) Oleksandr Saliuk	(Ukraine) Pavlo Cherepin	1–2, 4
Ford	Ford Fiesta S2000	Dream Team Ukraine	(Ukraine) Oleksandr Saliuk	(Ukraine) Adrian Aftanaziv	6
Ford	Ford Fiesta S2000	Dream Team Ukraine	(Ukraine) Oleksiy Tamrazov	(Italy) Nicola Arena	1–2, 4, 6–7
Ford	Ford Fiesta S2000	Dream Team Ukraine	(Finland) Mikko Pajunen	(Finland) Kaj Lindström	10
Ford	Ford Fiesta S2000	(United Kingdom) M-Sport	(United Kingdom) Alastair Fisher	(United Kingdom) Rory Kennedy	3
Ford	Ford Fiesta S2000	(France) Team Emap Yacco	(France) Julien Maurin	(France) Olivier Ural	4
Ford	Ford Fiesta S2000	(Norway) PS Engineering	(United Kingdom) Martin McCormack	(Republic of Ireland) David Moynihan	4
Ford	Ford Fiesta S2000	(Norway) PS Engineering	(Sweden) Patrik Flodin	(Sweden) Göran Bergsten	6, 8–9
Ford	Ford Fiesta S2000	(Norway) PS Engineering	(Sweden) Patrik Flodin	(Sweden) Morgan Olsson	7
Ford	Ford Fiesta S2000	(Norway) PS Engineering	(Hungary) Frigyes Turán	(Hungary) Gabor Zsiros	12
Ford	Ford Fiesta S2000	(Finland) Rali SM	(Finland) Juha Salo	(Finland) Marko Salminen	7
Ford	Ford Fiesta S2000	(Turkey) Castrol Ford Team Türkiye	(Turkey) Yağiz Avci	(Turkey) Bahadir Gücenmez	10–11
Ford	Ford Fiesta S2000	(Latvia) Sports Racing Technologies	(Russia) Vasiliy Gryazin	(Russia) Dmitry Chumak	13
Ford	Ford Fiesta RRC	(Italy) Movisport	(Italy) Giandomenico Basso	(Italy) Mitia Dotta	4–5, 7, 12
Ford	Ford Fiesta RRC	(Ukraine) 77 Rally Team	(Ukraine) Yuriy Protasov	(Ukraine) Kyrylo Nesvit	10
Ford	Ford Fiesta RRC	Qatar World Rally Team	(Qatar) Nasser Al-Attiyah	(Italy) Giovanni Bernacchini	13
Ford	Ford Fiesta RRC	(Lebanon) Motortune Racing	(Lebanon) Roger Feghali	(Lebanon) Joseph Matar	13
Ford	Ford Fiesta RRC	(Saudi Arabia) Yazeed Racing	(Saudi Arabia) Yazeed Al Rajhi	(United Kingdom) Michael Orr	13
Ford	Ford Fiesta RRC	QMMF Qatar Rally Team	(Qatar) Khalid Al-Suwaidi	(United Kingdom) Nicky Beech	13
Subaru	Subaru Impreza STi R4	(Romania) Napoca Rally Academy	(Italy) Marco Tempestini	(Romania) Dorin Pulpea	1–2, 4–5, 7, 10–13
Subaru	Subaru Impreza STi R4	(Japan) Team Arai	(Japan) Toshihiro Arai	(Australia) Dale Moscatt	4, 7, 9, 13
Subaru	Subaru Impreza STi R4	(Austria) Stohl Racing	(Austria) Andreas Aigner	(Austria) Daniela Ertl	4, 6
Subaru	Subaru Impreza STi R4	(Austria) Stohl Racing	(Austria) Andreas Aigner	(Austria) Ilka Minor	8–9, 12–13
Subaru	Subaru Impreza STi R4	(Finland) Tommi Mäkinen Racing	(Finland) Jarkko Nikara	(Finland) Jarkko Kalliolepo	4, 7, 9, 13
Subaru	Subaru Impreza WRX STi	(Romania) Napoca Rally Academy	(Italy) Simone Tempestini	(Italy) Lucio Baggio	8, 10
Subaru	Subaru Impreza WRX STi	(Ukraine) Xado Motorsport	(Ukraine) Mykola Chmykh	(Ukraine) Oleksandr Vilchynskyy	10
Renault	Renault Mégane RS	(France) Renault Sport Technologies	(France) Robert Consani	(France) Nicolas Klinger	2–6, 9–12
Renault	Renault Mégane RS	(France) Renault Sport Technologies	(France) François Delecour	(France) Dominique Savignoni	4
Renault	Renault Mégane RS	(France) Renault Sport Technologies	(France) Emmanuel Guigou	(France) Gabin Moreau	4
Renault	Renault Mégane RS	(France) Renault Sport Technologies	(Belgium) Kris Princen	(Belgium) Bram Eelbode	6
Renault	Renault Clio R3	(Bulgaria) Bulbet Rally Team	(Bulgaria) Todor Slavov	(Bulgaria) Dobromir Filipov	11
Mini	Mini John Cooper Works S2000	(United Kingdom) SMG Motorsport	(Spain) Dani Sordo	(Spain) Carlos del Barrio	4
Mini	Mini John Cooper Works S2000	(Belgium) Autostal Duindistel	(Belgium) Patrick Snijers	(Belgium) Johan Gitsels	6
Mini	Mini John Cooper Works S2000	(Czech Republic) EuroOil Invelt Team	(Czech Republic) Václav Pech	(Czech Republic) Petr Uhel	9
Mini	Mini John Cooper Works S2000	(Ukraine) AT Rally Team	(Ukraine) Oleksiy Tamrazov	(Italy) Nicola Arena	10
Mini	Mini John Cooper Works S2000	Seashore Qatar Rally Team	(Qatar) Misfer Al-Marri	(Italy) Nicola Arena	13
Mini	Mini John Cooper Works S2000	Seashore Qatar Rally Team	(Qatar) Abdulaziz Al-Kuwari	(Republic of Ireland) Killian Duffy	13
Abarth	Fiat Abarth Grande Punto S2000	(Turkey) Pegasus Racing	(Turkey) Fatih Kara	(Turkey) Guray Karacar	11

== Results ==
Round	Rally name	Podium finishers			
Round	Rally name	Rank	Driver	Car	Time
1	(Portugal) Rallye Açores (23–25 February)	1	(Norway) Andreas Mikkelsen	Škoda Fabia S2000	2:12:43.2
1	(Portugal) Rallye Açores (23–25 February)	2	(Finland) Juho Hänninen	Škoda Fabia S2000	2:13:08.3
1	(Portugal) Rallye Açores (23–25 February)	3	(France) Bryan Bouffier	Peugeot 207 S2000	2:14:48.0
2	(Spain) Rally Islas Canarias (15–17 March)	1	(Czech Republic) Jan Kopecký	Škoda Fabia S2000	2:21:46.5
2	(Spain) Rally Islas Canarias (15–17 March)	2	(Norway) Andreas Mikkelsen	Škoda Fabia S2000	2:22:14.8
2	(Spain) Rally Islas Canarias (15–17 March)	3	(Spain) Luis Monzón	Peugeot 207 S2000	2:25:00.1
3	(United Kingdom) Circuit of Ireland (6–7 April) — Results and report	1	(Finland) Juho Hänninen	Škoda Fabia S2000	1:58:21.8
3	(United Kingdom) Circuit of Ireland (6–7 April) — Results and report	2	(Norway) Andreas Mikkelsen	Škoda Fabia S2000	1:59:06.0
3	(United Kingdom) Circuit of Ireland (6–7 April) — Results and report	3	(Czech Republic) Jan Kopecký	Škoda Fabia S2000	2:00:01.3
4	(France) Tour de Corse (11–12 May)	1	(Spain) Dani Sordo	Mini John Cooper Works S2000	3:22:01.6
4	(France) Tour de Corse (11–12 May)	2	(Czech Republic) Jan Kopecký	Škoda Fabia S2000	3:22:19.5
4	(France) Tour de Corse (11–12 May)	3	(France) Pierre Campana	Peugeot 207 S2000	3:22:34.0
5	(Italy) Targa Florio Rally (14–16 June) (Note: The rally was abandoned after eight stages following the death of Gareth Roberts, co-driver to Craig Breen, in a crash on stage eight.)	1	(Czech Republic) Jan Kopecký	Škoda Fabia S2000	1:04:59.1
5	(Italy) Targa Florio Rally (14–16 June)	2	(Norway) Andreas Mikkelsen	Škoda Fabia S2000	1:04:59.9
5	(Italy) Targa Florio Rally (14–16 June)	3	(Italy) Giandomenico Basso	Ford Fiesta RRC	1:05:01.6
6	(Belgium) Ypres Rally (21–24 June)	1	(Finland) Juho Hänninen	Škoda Fabia S2000	2:36:52.7
6	(Belgium) Ypres Rally (21–24 June)	2	(Belgium) Freddy Loix	Peugeot 207 S2000	2:37:39.2
6	(Belgium) Ypres Rally (21–24 June)	3	(Belgium) Pieter Tsjoen	Škoda Fabia S2000	2:39:07.3
7	Rally San Marino (6–7 July)	1	(Italy) Giandomenico Basso	Ford Fiesta RRC	2:35:56.6
7	Rally San Marino (6–7 July)	2	(Norway) Andreas Mikkelsen	Škoda Fabia S2000	2:35:59.4
7	Rally San Marino (6–7 July)	3	(Italy) Umberto Scandola	Škoda Fabia S2000	2:37:38.2
8	Sibiu Rally Romania (20–21 July)	1	(Norway) Andreas Mikkelsen	Škoda Fabia S2000	2:15:28.0
8	Sibiu Rally Romania (20–21 July)	2	(Sweden) Patrik Flodin	Ford Fiesta S2000	2:21:01.8
8	Sibiu Rally Romania (20–21 July)	3	(France) François Delecour	Peugeot 207 S2000	2:27:24.9
9	(Czech Republic) Barum Rally Zlín (31 August – 2 September) — Results and report	1	(Finland) Juho Hänninen	Škoda Fabia S2000	2:11:28.2
9	(Czech Republic) Barum Rally Zlín (31 August – 2 September) — Results and report	2	(Czech Republic) Roman Kresta	Škoda Fabia S2000	2:13:11.3
9	(Czech Republic) Barum Rally Zlín (31 August – 2 September) — Results and report	3	(Czech Republic) Tomáš Kostka	Škoda Fabia S2000	2:13:20.0
10	(Ukraine) Prime Yalta Rally (15–16 September)	1	(Turkey) Yağiz Avci	Ford Fiesta S2000	3:09:58.7
10	(Ukraine) Prime Yalta Rally (15–16 September)	2	(France) Robert Consani	Renault Mégane RS	3:13:11.1
10	(Ukraine) Prime Yalta Rally (15–16 September)	3	(Hungary) László Vizin	Škoda Fabia S2000	3:13:37.1
11	(Bulgaria) Rally Sliven (29–30 September)	1	(Bulgaria) Dimitar Iliev	Škoda Fabia S2000	1:48:58.7
11	(Bulgaria) Rally Sliven (29–30 September)	2	(Bulgaria) Petar Gyoshev	Peugeot 207 S2000	1:49:09.9
11	(Bulgaria) Rally Sliven (29–30 September)	3	(Bulgaria) Krum Donchev	Peugeot 207 S2000	1:52:24.0
12	(Italy) Rallye Sanremo (12–13 October)	1	(Italy) Giandomenico Basso	Ford Fiesta RRC	2:19:03.6
12	(Italy) Rallye Sanremo (12–13 October)	2	(Czech Republic) Jan Kopecký	Škoda Fabia S2000	2:19:39.3
12	(Italy) Rallye Sanremo (12–13 October)	3	(Italy) Alessandro Perico	Peugeot 207 S2000	2:21:17.3
13	Cyprus Rally (2–3 November)	1	(Qatar) Nasser Al-Attiyah	Ford Fiesta RRC	3:16:25.2
13	Cyprus Rally (2–3 November)	2	(Norway) Andreas Mikkelsen	Škoda Fabia S2000	3:20:00.5
13	Cyprus Rally (2–3 November)	3	(Japan) Toshihiro Arai	Subaru Impreza R4	3:26:32.3

== Standings ==
=== Drivers ===
- Only the best eight scores from each driver count towards the championship.

Pos	Driver	AZO (Portugal)	CAN (Spain)	IRE (United Kingdom)	COR (France)	TAR (Italy)	YPR (Belgium)	SMR (San Marino)	ROM (Romania)	ZLI (Czech Republic)	YAL (Ukraine)	SLI (Bulgaria)	SAN (Italy)	CYP (Cyprus)	Pts
1	(Norway) Andreas Mikkelsen	1	2	2	5	2	Ret	2	1	8				2	168
2	(Czech Republic) Jan Kopecký		1	3	2	1				Ret			2		101
3	(Finland) Juho Hänninen	2		1			1			1			Ret		93
4	(Germany) Sepp Wiegand	4	4	7	8	7		4	Ret	10				5	73
5	(Italy) Giandomenico Basso				Ret	3		1					1		65
6	(Qatar) Nasser Al-Attiyah													1	50
7	(Turkey) Yagiz Avci										1	5			35
8	(Finland) Jarkko Nikara				Ret			5		Ret				4	34
9	(France) Robert Consani	Ret	10	Ret		10		Ret	6		2	8			32
10	(Japan) Toshihiro Arai				14			Ret		11				3	30
11	(Sweden) Patrik Flodin						5	Ret	2	15					28
12	(France) Bryan Bouffier	3			4										27
12	(Italy) Umberto Scandola					4		3							27
14	(Republic of Ireland) Craig Breen			5	6	Ret							6		26
15	(Bulgaria) Dimitar Iliev											1			25
15	(Spain) Dani Sordo				1										25
17	(Italy) Paolo Andreucci					5							5		20
18	(France) Pierre Campana				3								8		19
18	(Italy) Alessandro Perico					8							3		19
20	(Bulgaria) Petar Gyoshev											2			18
20	(Belgium) Freddy Loix						2								18
20	(Czech Republic) Roman Kresta									2					18
20	(Republic of Ireland) Robert Barrable			6			Ret			5					18
24	(Romania) Marco Tempestini	Ret	20		Ret	17		7	Ret		5				16
25	(Belgium) Pieter Tsjoen						3								15
25	(Bulgaria) Krum Donchev											3			15
25	(Hungary) László Vizin										3				15
25	(Czech Republic) Tomáš Kostka									3					15
25	(Spain) Luis Monzón		3												15
25	(France) François Delecour								3						15
31	(Turkey) Murat Bostanci										6	7			14
31	(Poland) Michał Sołowow						4			9					14
33	(Italy) Stefano Albertini												4		12
33	(Bulgaria) Todor Slavov											4			12
33	(Czech Republic) Jaromir Tarabus									4					12
33	(Ukraine) Mykola Chmykh										4				12
33	(Germany) Hermann Gassner	5	Ret		9										12
33	(Ukraine) Vitaliy Pushkar					23	31		4						12
33	(France) Mathieu Arzeno			4	11		Ret		Ret						12
40	(Spain) Jonathan Pérez		5												10
40	(Romania) Edwin Keleti								5						10
40	(Austria) Andreas Aigner				12		8		Ret	7					10
43	(Belgium) Mathias Viaene						6								8
43	(Hungary) Gergély Szabó							6	Ret						8
43	(Spain) Angel Marrero		6												8
43	(Estonia) Karl Kruuda									6					8
43	(Italy) Matteo Gamba					6									8
43	(Portugal) Ricardo Moura	6	Ret												8
43	(Estonia) Martin Kangur											6			8
50	(Belgium) Jonas Langenakens						7								6
50	(France) Jean-Marc Manzagol				7										6
50	(Romania) Valentin Porcisteanu								7						6
50	(Hungary) János Puskádi		7					Ret							6
50	(Italy) Marco Cavigioli										7				6
50	(Ukraine) Oleksandr Saliuk, Jr.	7	Ret		Ret		Ret								6
56	(Slovenia) Asja Zupanc								8						4
56	(Ukraine) Oleksiy Panoc										8				4
56	(United Kingdom) Garry Jennings			8											4
56	(Italy) Gabriele Noberasco							8							4
56	(Portugal) Sérgio Silva	8													4
56	(United Arab Emirates) Rashid Al Ketbi	Ret	8		22	19	15								4
62	(Bulgaria) Stoyan Apostolov											9			2
62	(Czech Republic) Antonín Tlusťák						9								2
62	(Ukraine) Stanislav Besedin										9				2
62	(Spain) Germán Hernández		9												2
62	(Hungary) Miklós Bujdos							9							2
62	(Republic of Ireland) Donagh Kelly			9											2
62	(Italy) Massimiliano Rendina					9									2
62	(Portugal) Ruben Rodrigues	9													2
62	(Romania) Bogdan Marişca								9						2
71	(Italy) Federico Gasperetti												10		1
71	(Turkey) Bugra Banaz											10			1
71	(Turkey) Eytan Halfon										10				1
71	(Belgium) Bob Colsoul						10								1
71	(Republic of Ireland) Sam Moffett			10											1
71	(Italy) Paolo Diana							10							1
71	(Portugal) Miguel Barbosa	10													1
71	(Romania) Alexandru Filip								10						1
71	(France) Jean-Mathieu Leandri				10										1
Pos	Driver	AZO (Portugal)	CAN (Spain)	IRE (United Kingdom)	COR (France)	TAR (Italy)	YPR (Belgium)	SMR (San Marino)	ROM (Romania)	ZLI (Czech Republic)	YAL (Ukraine)	SLI (Bulgaria)	SAN (Italy)	CYP (Cyprus)	Pts

Key
Colour	Result
Gold	Winner
Silver	2nd place
Bronze	3rd place
Green	Points finish
Blue	Non-points finish
Blue	Non-classified finish (NC)
Purple	Did not finish (Ret)
Black	Excluded (EX)
Black	Disqualified (DSQ)
White	Did not start (DNS)
White	Cancelled (C)
Blank	Withdrew entry from the event (WD)

=== Manufacturers ===
- Only the best eight scores from each manufacturer count towards the championship.

Pos	Manufacturer	AZO (Portugal)	CAN (Spain)	IRE (United Kingdom)	COR (France)	TAR (Italy)	YPR (Belgium)	SMR (San Marino)	ROM (Romania)	ZLI (Czech Republic)	YAL (Ukraine)	SLI (Bulgaria)	SAN (Italy)	CYP (Cyprus)	Total	Drop	Pts
1	(Czech Republic) Škoda	43	43	43	37	43	40	33	25	43	15	25	22	56	468	120	348
2	(France) Peugeot	15	27	27	33	22	30	0	15	18	0	33	27	0	247	30	217
3	(United Kingdom) M-Sport	12	4	6	2	15	14	31	18	8	33	16	35	50	244	32	212
4	(Japan) Subaru	10	2	0	16	3	10	22	0	25	22	2	2	54	168	6	162
5	(France) Renault	0	7	18	12	14	1	12	22	6	18	16	14	0	140	14	126
6	(Japan) Honda	0	18	0	0	4	6	0	8	1	6	8	0	16	67		67
Pos	Manufacturer	AZO (Portugal)	CAN (Spain)	IRE (United Kingdom)	COR (France)	TAR (Italy)	YPR (Belgium)	SMR (San Marino)	ROM (Romania)	ZLI (Czech Republic)	YAL (Ukraine)	SLI (Bulgaria)	SAN (Italy)	CYP (Cyprus)	Total	Drop	Pts
