= Valentin Porcișteanu =

Romanian rally driver

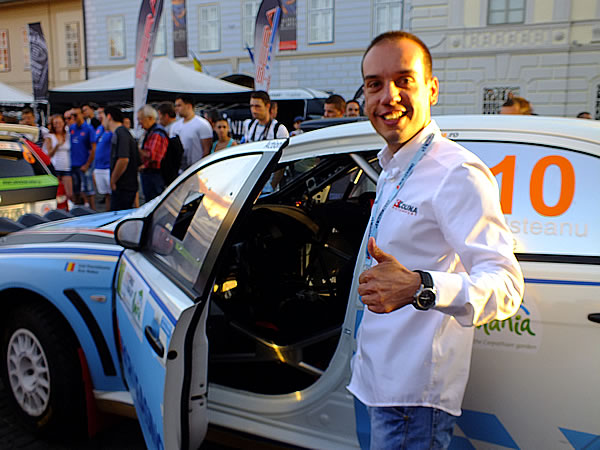
- Valentin Porcisteanu – IRC Sibiu Rally 2012. Photo: Romeo Tudorache – rallyROM
- Nationality: Romanian
- Born: November 25, 1982 (age 43) Bucharest, Romania
- Debut season: 2003 (Harghita Rally); First win: 2009 (Brasov Rally)
- Current team: Vali Porcișteanu Racing
- Co-driver: Dan Dobre
- Former teams: Eurolines Racing Team (starting 2004)
- Championships: 17
- Wins: 9

Championship titles
- 2011: Romanian National Rally Champion

Awards
- 2013: Colin McRae Flat Out Trophy

Valentin Porcișteanu (born November 25, 1982, in Bucharest, Romania) is a driver in the Romanian Rally Championship, who won the National Champion title in 2011, four National Runner-Up titles in 2010, 2012, 2018, and 2019, and the Colin McRae Flat Out Trophy in 2013 (ERC Sibiu Rally).

== Early career ==
Before running in the Romanian National Rallying Championship, Porcișteanu competed in the Romanian Hill Climb Championship, obtaining two podiums in Abrud Hill Climb 2003 (third place, young drivers' classification) and Brasov Hill Climb 2003 (third place, Class N1.6).

== Romanian National Rally Championship ==
=== 2003 – 2007 ===
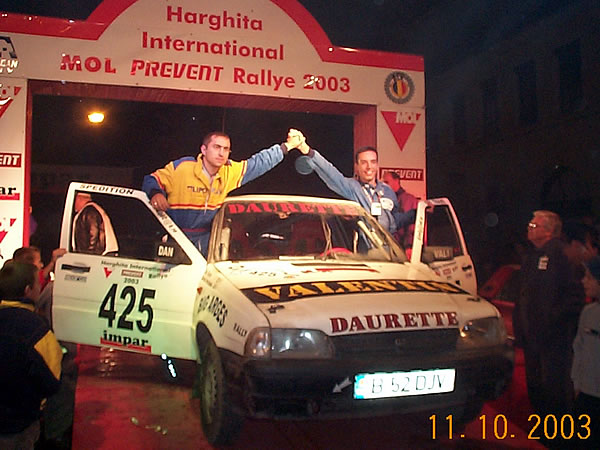
Valentin Porcisteanu – Harghita Rally 2003. Photo: Romeo Tudorache – rallyROM

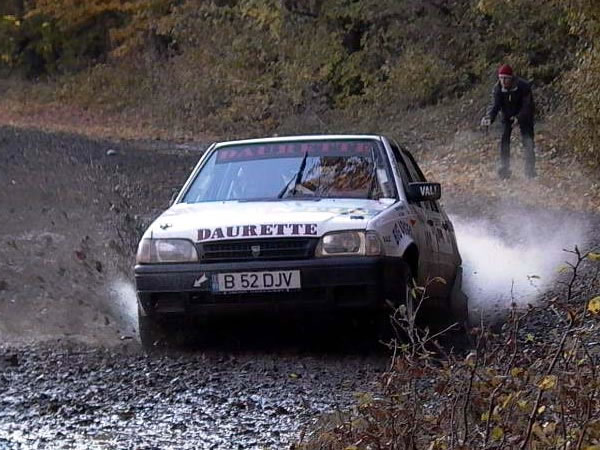
Valentin Porcisteanu – Cluj Rally 2003. Photo: Romeo Tudorache – rallyROM

Porcisteanu made his debut in the Romanian National Rallying Championship in 2003, his first appearance taking place at Arges Rally, as zero car. In his very first year, he scored two class podiums in N1.6 Trophy, at the Harghita Rally and Cluj Rally, announcing himself as a strong candidate for the future seasons. Following the 2004 season in which he competed with a Dacia Nova GTI, within Class N1.6, finishing fourth at Brasov Rally, third at Romania Rally and fourth at Harghita Rally, in 2005, he drove a Citroen Saxo VTS, his best event results being Class N1.6 victories at the Maramures Rally and Bucharest Rally. His positive development continued in 2006, when he scored two more Class N1.6 victories at the Sibiu Rally and Tara Barsei Rally. One year later, in 2007, he scored seven wins in the row, at end of the season being 1st in N2 class standings.

=== 2008 – 2012 ===
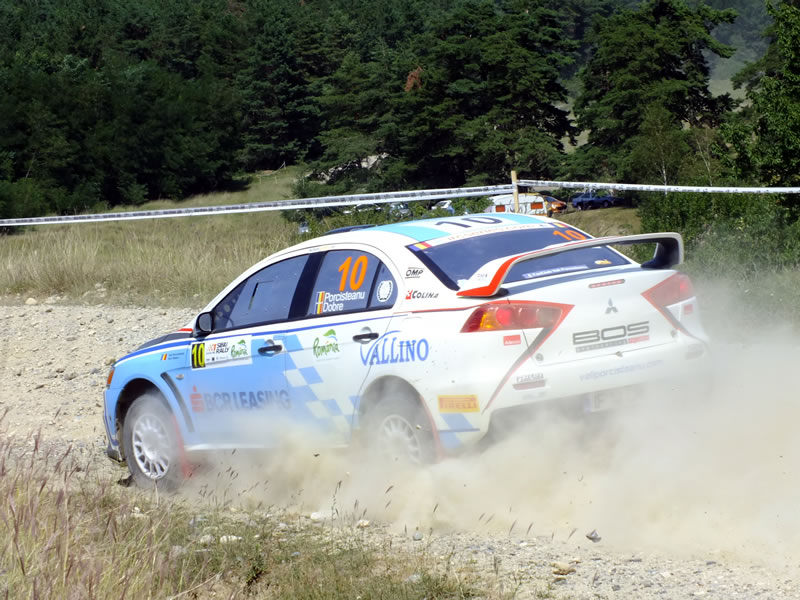
Valentin Porcisteanu – IRC Sibiu Rally 2012. Photo: Romeo Tudorache – rallyROM

In 2008, Porcișteanu stepped into the top class of the Romanian National Rallying Championship, competing with a Mitsubishi Lancer Evo VII and finishing seventh in the overall ranking and fourth in the Mitsubishi Lancer Cup. Porcisteanu started the 2009 season in the best possible way, with a win in Brasov Rally, followed by other outstanding results: two second places in the Tara Barsei Rally and Banat Rally and two third places in Cluj Rally and Arges Rally, securing a fourth place overall in the drivers' national championship. In 2010, he scored a win in Tara Barsei Rally and three second places at Brasov, Sibiu, Arad, finishing second in the Romanian National Rally Championship Ranking. 2011 is the year of the greatest success of his career – he scored wins in Brasov Rally, Cluj Rally, Arad Rally and Tara Barsei Rally, and ended up the season as the youngest (28 years) Champion ever in the Romanian National Rally Championship history. In the 2012 season, he won a second National Runner-up Title, after two victories in TESS Rally and Timis Rally and two podium finishes – third in Transylvania Rally and again third in Sibiu Rally (Intercontinental Rally Challenge).

== European Rally Championship ==
In 2009, Porcișteanu participated in two European Rally Championship events, finishing 17th in the Rally Mille Miglia and on the 6th position in Croatia Delta Rally. In the same year, he qualified and represented Romania at the final Pirelli Star Driver, a competition initiate to support young rally drivers, organised by Pirelli and the Fédération Internationale de l'Automobile (FIA). That year, Ott Tanak was the winner.

The inclusion of Sibiu Rally in the 2013 European Rally Championship offered Porcișteanu the chance to participate in another international event along with some prominent personalities of European and World motorsport: Jan Kopecky, Bryan Bouffier, François Delecour, Toshihiro Arai. At the end of the competition, he secured the sixth place in the FIA overall ranking, his evolution being also rewarded with the Colin McRae Flat Out Trophy Award.

== Personal life ==
Porcișteanu lives in Pitesti, Arges County, Romania. He is married and has two kids, a girl – Sophia (born 2017) and a boy – Damian (born 2023). In that town, he owns his Rally & Defensive Driving School (Vali Porcisteanu Driving School) plus his own Rally Team (Vali Porcisteanu Racing) with 9 rally cars (3x Dacia Logan, 2x Dacia Sandero, 1 Suzuki Swift sport, 1 Citroen C2 VTS, 1 Mitsubishi Lancer Evo 9, 1 Skoda Fabia R5. Starting in 2021, he launched his personal campaign of finding new future talented rally drivers, to support them every year throughout Pilot de curse program.

== Romanian Rally Championship Podiums ==
Year	Title	Car
2010	Romanian National Rally Runner-Up	Mitsubishi Lancer EVO IX
2011	Romanian National Rally Champion	Mitsubishi Lancer EVO IX
2012	Romanian National Rally Runner-Up	Mitsubishi Lancer EVO X R4
2017	Romanian National Rally – 3rd Overall & 1st Group N	Mitsubishi Lancer EVO IX
2018	Romanian National Rally Runner-Up	Skoda Fabia R5
2019	Romanian National Rally Runner-Up	Citroen C3 R5
2022	10th Overall & 1st Group N	Mitsubishi Lancer EVO IX

== Romanian Rally Championship results ==
=== 2003 ===
#	Rally	Codriver	Car	Result
1	Harghita Rally	Dan Dobre	Dacia Nova	3rd, Class N1.6
2	Cluj Rally	Dan Dobre	Dacia Nova	2nd Class N1.6, 4th young drivers

=== 2004 ===
#	Rally	Codriver	Car	Result
1	Brasov Rally	Dan Dobre	Dacia Nova GTI	4th Class N1.6
2	Romanian Rally	Dan Dobre	Dacia Nova GTI	3rd Class N1.6
3	Harghita Rally	Dan Dobre	Dacia Nova GTI	4th Class N1.6

=== 2005 ===
#	Rally	Codriver	Car	Result
1	Brasov Rally	Dan Dobre	Citroen Saxo VTS	4th Class N1.6
2	Maramures Rally	Dan Dobre	Citroen Saxo VTS	1st Class N1.6
3	Cluj Rally	Dan Dobre	Citroen Saxo VTS	2nd Class N1.6
4	Hunedoara Rally	Dan Dobre	Citroen Saxo VTS	2nd Class N1.6
5	Bucharest Rally	Dan Dobre	Citroen Saxo VTS	1st Class N1.6
2005 Romanian National Rally Championship				2nd – N1.6 Trophy

=== 2006 ===
#	Rally	Codriver	Car	Result
1	Brasov Rally	Dan Dobre	Citroen Saxo VTS	3rd Class N1.6
2	Maramures Rally	Dan Dobre	Citroen Saxo VTS	3rd Class N1.6
3	Sibiu Rally	Dan Dobre	Citroen Saxo VTS	1st Class N1.6
4	Muscel Rally	Dan Dobre	Citroen Saxo VTS	DNF
5	Tara Barsei Rally	Dan Dobre	Citroen Saxo VTS	1st Class N1.6
6	Hunedoara Rally	Dan Dobre	Citroen Saxo VTS	2nd Class N1.6
2006 Romanian National Rally Championship				2nd – N1.6 Trophy

=== 2007 ===
#	Rally	Codriver	Car	Result
1	Brasov Rally	Dan Dobre	Citroen Saxo VTS	1st Class N2
2	Banat Rally	Dan Dobre	Citroen Saxo VTS	1st Class N2
3	Hunedoara Rally	Dan Dobre	Citroen Saxo VTS	1st Class N2
4	Mobil1 Siromex Rally	Dan Dobre	Citroen Saxo VTS	1st Class N2
5	Mobil1 Cluj Rally	Dan Dobre	Citroen Saxo VTS	1st Class N2
6	Tara Barsei Rally	Dan Dobre	Citroen Saxo VTS	1st Class N2
7	Avram Iancu Rally	Dan Dobre	Citroen Saxo VTS	1st Class N2
2007 Romanian National Rally Championship				1st – Class N2

=== 2008 ===
#	Rally	Codriver	Car	Result
1	Brasov Rally	Dan Dobre	Mitsubishi Lancer EVO VII	9th Overall ranking 5th Mitsubishi Lancer Cup
2	Banat Rally	Dan Dobre	Mitsubishi Lancer EVO VII	6th Overall ranking 4th Mitsubishi Lancer Cup
3	Cluj Rally	Dan Dobre	Mitsubishi Lancer EVO VII	7th Overall ranking 4th Mitsubishi Lancer Cup
4	Tara Barsei Rally	Dan Dobre	Mitsubishi Lancer EVO VII	5th Overall ranking
2008 Romanian National Rally Championship				7th Overall ranking 4th Mitsubishi Lancer Cup

=== 2009 ===
#	Rally	Codriver	Car	Result
1	Brasov Rally	Dan Dobre	Mitsubishi Lancer EVO IX	1st Overall ranking
2	Banat Rally	Dan Dobre	Mitsubishi Lancer EVO IX	2nd Overall ranking
3	Iasi Rally	Dan Dobre	Mitsubishi Lancer EVO IX	DNF
4	Cluj Rally	Dan Dobre	Mitsubishi Lancer EVO IX	3rd Overall ranking
5	Sibiu Rally	Dan Dobre	Mitsubishi Lancer EVO IX	DNF
6	Tara Barsei Rally	Dan Dobre	Mitsubishi Lancer EVO IX	2nd Overall ranking
7	Arges Rally	Dan Dobre	Mitsubishi Lancer EVO IX	3rd Overall ranking
2009 Romanian National Rally Championship				4th Overall ranking

=== 2010 ===
#	Rally	Codriver	Car	Result
1	Brasov Rally	Dan Dobre	Mitsubishi Lancer EVO IX	2nd Overall ranking
2	Arges Rally	Dan Dobre	Mitsubishi Lancer EVO IX	5th Overall ranking
3	Targu Mures Rally	Dan Dobre	Mitsubishi Lancer EVO IX	DNF
4	Cluj Rally	Dan Dobre	Mitsubishi Lancer EVO IX	7th Overall ranking
5	Sibiu Rally	Dan Dobre	Mitsubishi Lancer EVO IX	2nd Overall ranking
6	Tara Barsei Rally	Dan Dobre	Mitsubishi Lancer EVO IX	1st Overall ranking
7	Arad Rally	Dan Dobre	Mitsubishi Lancer EVO IX	2nd Overall ranking
8	Iasi Rally	Dan Dobre	Mitsubishi Lancer EVO IX	4th Overall ranking
2010 Romanian National Rally Championship				2nd Overall ranking

=== 2011 ===
#	Rally	Codriver	Car	Result
1	Brasov Rally	Dan Dobre	Mitsubishi Lancer EVO IX	1st Overall ranking
2	Targu Mures Rally	Dan Dobre	Mitsubishi Lancer EVO IX	7th Overall ranking
3	Cluj Rally	Dan Dobre	Mitsubishi Lancer EVO IX	1st Overall ranking
4	Arges Rally	Dan Dobre	Mitsubishi Lancer EVO IX	Cancelled
5	Sibiu Rally	Dan Dobre	Mitsubishi Lancer EVO IX	DNF
6	Arad Rally	Dan Dobre	Mitsubishi Lancer EVO IX	1st Overall ranking
7	Tara Barsei Rally	Dan Dobre	Mitsubishi Lancer EVO IX	1st Overall ranking
8	Iasi Rally	Dan Dobre	Mitsubishi Lancer EVO IX	4th Overall ranking
9	Bacau Rally	Dan Dobre	Mitsubishi Lancer EVO IX	4th Overall ranking
2011 Romanian National Rally Championship				National Champion

=== 2012 ===
#	Rally	Codriver	Car	Result
1	TESS Rally	Dan Dobre	Mitsubishi Lancer EVO X R4	1st FIA Overall ranking
2	Timis Rally	Dan Dobre	Mitsubishi Lancer EVO X R4	1st FIA Overall ranking
3	Moldova Rally	Dan Dobre	Mitsubishi Lancer EVO X R4	5th FIA Overall ranking
4	Transilvania Rally	Dan Dobre	Mitsubishi Lancer EVO X R4	3rd FIA Overall ranking
5	Sibiu Rally	Dan Dobre	Mitsubishi Lancer EVO X R4	3rd FIA Overall ranking
6	Arad Rally	Dan Dobre	Mitsubishi Lancer EVO X R4	6th FIA Overall ranking
7	Tara Barsei Rally	Dan Dobre	Mitsubishi Lancer EVO X R4	5th FIA Overall ranking
8	Iasi Rally	Dan Dobre	Mitsubishi Lancer EVO X R4	DNF
2012 Romanian National Rally Championship				2nd Overall ranking

=== 2013 ===
#	Rally	Codriver	Car	Result
1	TESS Rally	Dan Dobre	Mitsubishi Lancer EVO X R4	6th FIA Overall ranking
2	Timis Rally	Dan Dobre	Mitsubishi Lancer EVO X R4	3rd FIA Overall ranking
3	Delta Rally	Dan Dobre	Mitsubishi Lancer EVO X R4	DNS
4	Transilvania Rally	Dan Dobre	Mitsubishi Lancer EVO X R4	4th FIA Overall ranking
5	Sibiu Rally	Dan Dobre	Mitsubishi Lancer EVO X R4	4th FIA Overall ranking
6	Arad Rally	Dan Dobre	Mitsubishi Lancer EVO X R4	3rd FIA Overall ranking
7	Moldova Rally	Dan Dobre	Mitsubishi Lancer EVO X R4	4th FIA Overall ranking
8	Iasi Rally	Dan Dobre	Mitsubishi Lancer EVO X R4	DNF
9	Harghita Rally	Dan Dobre	Mitsubishi Lancer EVO X R4	DNS
2013 Romanian National Rally Championship				4th Overall ranking

=== 2017 ===
#	Rally	Codriver	Car	Result
1	TESS Rally	Dan Dobre	Mitsubishi Lancer EVO IX	4th FIA Overall ranking
2	Transilvania Rally	Dan Dobre	Mitsubishi Lancer EVO IX	3rd FIA Overall ranking
3	Arad Rally	Dan Dobre	Mitsubishi Lancer EVO IX	3rd FIA Overall ranking
4	Moldova Rally	Dan Dobre	Mitsubishi Lancer EVO IX	2nd FIA Overall ranking
5	Harghita Rally	Dan Dobre	Mitsubishi Lancer EVO IX	6th FIA Overall ranking
6	Iasi Rally	Dan Dobre	Mitsubishi Lancer EVO IX	4th FIA Overall ranking
7	Sibiu Rally	Dan Dobre	Mitsubishi Lancer EVO IX	3rd FIA Overall ranking
2017 Romanian National Rally Championship				3rd Overall ranking 1st Group N

=== 2018 ===
#	Rally	Codriver	Car	Result
1	TESS Rally	Dan Dobre	Skoda Fabia R5	3rd FIA Overall ranking
2	Transilvania Rally	Dan Dobre	Skoda Fabia R5	3rd FIA Overall ranking
3	Arad Rally	Dan Dobre	Skoda Fabia R5	1st FIA Overall ranking
4	Moldova Rally	Dan Dobre	Skoda Fabia R5	2nd FIA Overall ranking
5	Harghita Rally	Dan Dobre	Skoda Fabia R5	4th FIA Overall ranking
6	Iasi Rally	Dan Dobre	Skoda Fabia R5	DNF
7	Sibiu Rally	Dan Dobre	Skoda Fabia R5	2nd FIA Overall ranking
2018 Romanian National Rally Championship				2nd Overall ranking

=== 2019 ===
#	Rally	Codriver	Car	Result
1	Arges Rally	Dan Dobre	Citroen C3 R5	2nd FIA Overall ranking
2	Arad Rally	Dan Dobre	Citroen C3 R5	3rd FIA Overall ranking
3	Moldova Rally	Dan Dobre	Citroen C3 R5	1st FIA Overall ranking
4	Harghita Rally	Dan Dobre	Citroen C3 R5	5th FIA Overall ranking
5	Sibiu Rally	Dan Dobre	Citroen C3 R5	3rd FIA Overall ranking
6	Iasi Rally	Dan Dobre	Citroen C3 R5	1st FIA Overall ranking
7	Transilvania Rally	Dan Dobre	Citroen C3 R5	4th FIA Overall ranking
8	Tess Rally	Dan Dobre	Citroen C3 R5	DNF
2019 Romanian National Rally Championship				2nd Overall ranking

=== 2020 ===
#	Rally	Codriver	Car	Result
1	Arges Rally	Dan Dobre	Mitsubishi Lancer Evo 9	4th Overall/1st RC2N
2	Sibiu Rally	Dan Dobre	Mitsubishi Lancer Evo 9	DNF
3	Iasi Rally	Dan Dobre	Mitsubishi Lancer Evo 9	DNF

=== 2022 ===
#	Rally	Codriver	Car	Result
1	Arges Rally	Dan Dobre	Mitsubishi Lancer Evo 9	6th Overall / 1st RC2N
2	Bucovina Rally	Dan Dobre	Mitsubishi Lancer Evo 9	7th Overall / 1st RC2N
3	Sibiu Rally	Dan Dobre	Mitsubishi Lancer Evo 9	33th Overall / 4th RC2N
4	Bacau Rally	Dan Dobre	Mitsubishi Lancer Evo 9	6th Overall / 1st RC2N
5	Iasi Rally	Dan Dobre	Mitsubishi Lancer Evo 9	22nd Overall / 3rd RC2N
6	Cluj Rally	Dan Dobre	Mitsubishi Lancer Evo 9	8th Overall / 1st RC2N
2022 Romanian National Rally Championship				10th Overall / 1st RC2N class

=== 2023 ===
#	Rally	Codriver	Car	Result
1	Arges Rally	Dan Dobre	Mitsubishi Lancer Evo 9	9th Overall / 1st RC2N
2	Maramures Rally	Dan Dobre	Mitsubishi Lancer Evo 9	14th Overall / 2nd RC2N
3	Sibiu Rally	Dan Dobre	Mitsubishi Lancer Evo 9	DNF
4	Bacau Rally	Dan Dobre	Mitsubishi Lancer Evo 9	4th Overall / 1st RC2N
5	Iasi Rally	Dan Dobre	Mitsubishi Lancer Evo 9	5th Overall / 1st RC2N
6	Cluj Rally	Dan Dobre	Mitsubishi Lancer Evo 9	7th Overall / 1st RC2N
7	Brasov Rally	Dan Dobre	Mitsubishi Lancer Evo 9	6th Overall / 1st RC2N
2023 Romanian National Rally Championship				6th Overall / 1st RC2N class

=== 2024 ===
#	Rally	Codriver	Car	Result
1	Arges Rally	Dan Dobre	Mitsubishi Lancer Evo 9	16th Overall / 1st RC2N
2	Cluj Rally	Dan Dobre	Mitsubishi Lancer Evo 9	9th Overall / 1st RC2N
3	Sibiu Rally	Dan Dobre	Mitsubishi Lancer Evo 9	14th Overall / 2nd RC2N
4	Bacau Rally	Dan Dobre	Mitsubishi Lancer Evo 9	4th Overall / 1st RC2N
5	Iasi Rally	Dan Dobre	Mitsubishi Lancer Evo 9	9th Overall / 1st RC2N
6	Brasov Rally	Dan Dobre	Mitsubishi Lancer Evo 9	9th Overall / 1st RC2N
7	Valcea Rally	Dan Dobre	Mitsubishi Lancer Evo 9	9th Overall / 1st RC2N
2024 Romanian National Rally Championship				13th Overall / 1st RC2N class

=== 2025 ===
#	Rally	Codriver	Car	Result
1	Winter Rally	Dan Dobre	Skoda Fabia R5	1st Overall / 1st RC2

#	Rally	Codriver	Car	Result
1	Harghita Rally	Dan Dobre	Skoda Fabia R5	** th Overall / ** st RC2
2	Maramures Rally	Dan Dobre	Skoda Fabia R5	** th Overall / ** st RC2
3	Cluj Rally	Dan Dobre	Skoda Fabia R5	** th Overall / ** st RC2
4	Sibiu Rally	Dan Dobre	Skoda Fabia R5	** th Overall / ** st RC2
5	Moldova Rally	Dan Dobre	Skoda Fabia R5	** th Overall / ** st RC2
6	Iasi Rally	Dan Dobre	Skoda Fabia R5	** th Overall / ** st RC2
7	Valcea Rally	Dan Dobre	Skoda Fabia R5	** th Overall / ** st RC2
8	Brasov Rally	Dan Dobre	Skoda Fabia R5	** th Overall / ** st RC2
9	Arges Rally	Dan Dobre	Skoda Fabia R5	** th Overall / ** st RC2
2025 Romanian National Rally Championship				*** Overall / *** RC2 class

== European Rally Championship Results ==
=== 2009 ===
#	Rally	Codriver	Car	Result
1	Rally Mille Miglia	Dan Dobre	Mitsubishi Lancer EVO IX	17th FIA Overall ranking
2	Croatia Delta Rally	Dan Dobre	Mitsubishi Lancer EVO IX	6th FIA Overall ranking

=== 2013 ===
#	Rally	Codriver	Car	Result
1	Sibiu Rally	Dan Dobre	Mitsubishi Lancer EVO X R4	6th FIA Overall ranking
1	Sibiu Rally	Dan Dobre	Mitsubishi Lancer EVO X R4	Colin McRae Flat Out Trophy Winner

== Intercontinental Rally Challenge Results ==
=== 2012 ===
#	Rally	Codriver	Car	Result
1	Sibiu Rally	Dan Dobre	Mitsubishi Lancer EVO X R4	7th FIA Overall ranking
