= Sibiu Rally Romania =

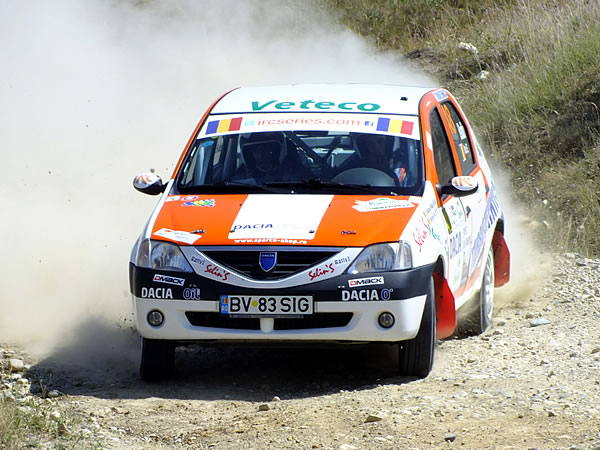
Raul Badiu driving a Dacia Logan during the 2012 Sibiu Rally Romania

The Sibiu Rally Romania, known originally as the Raliul Sibiului, is an international rallying event based in Transylvania in central Romania. The event is a round of the European Rally Championship, the Romanian Rally Championship and the Bulgarian Rally Championship. Previously the event had been a round of the Intercontinental Rally Challenge and has been a predominantly gravel event since inception with some stages held on tarmac.

First run in 2001 as a round of the Romanian championship held in the middle of the year, originally in August before settling into a July date. The event became an international event for the first time in 2012 when it was added to the Intercontinental Challenge and Romania was added to the event name as Sibiului Raliul Romania. It was one of four events added to the calendar and slid into a mid-season gap when Atlantic Ocean island event Rallye Açores was moved to the start of the season. The event survived the merger of the Intercontinental Challenge and the European Championship into 2013 when the rally acquired its current name.

Romanian drivers dominated the events early history, the first foreign victor was Finn Jarkko Miettinen in 2008. Simone Tempestini is the most successful driver in the events history, winning five times in total. Norwegian driver Andreas Mikkelsen won the first international event in 2012, with Czech driver Jan Kopecký winning the first European championship round.

== List of winners ==
Year	Winner	Car	Series
2001	(Romania) Mihai Leu	Ford Escort RS Cosworth	Romanian Rally Championship
2002	(Romania) Constantin Aur	SEAT Córdoba WRC	Romanian Rally Championship
2003	(Romania) Constantin Aur	Mitsubishi Lancer Evo VI	Romanian Rally Championship
2004	(Romania) Bogdan Marisca	Mitsubishi Lancer Evo VI	Romanian Rally Championship
2005	(Romania) Constantin Aur	Mitsubishi Lancer Evo VI	Romanian Rally Championship
2006	(Romania) Constantin Aur	Mitsubishi Lancer Evo IX	Romanian Rally Championship
2007	(Romania) Bogdan Marisca	Mitsubishi Lancer Evo IX	Romanian Rally Championship
2008	(Finland) Jarkko Miettinen	Mitsubishi Lancer Evo IX	Romanian Rally Championship
2009	(Finland) Jarkko Miettinen	Mitsubishi Lancer Evo IX	Romanian Rally Championship
2010	(Hungary) Gergely Szabó	Mitsubishi Lancer Evo IX	Romanian Rally Championship
2011	(Hungary) Gergely Szabó	Mitsubishi Lancer Evo IX	Romanian Rally Championship
2012	(Norway) Andreas Mikkelsen	Škoda Fabia S2000	Intercontinental Rally Challenge; Romanian Rally Championship
2013	(Czech Republic) Jan Kopecký	Škoda Fabia S2000	European Rally Championship; Romanian Rally Championship
2014	cancelled		European Rally Championship
2015	(Italy) Simone Tempestini	Ford Fiesta R5	Romanian Rally Championship
2016	(Romania) Dan Gritofan	Škoda Fabia R5	Romanian Rally Championship; Bulgarian Rally Championship
2017	(Romania) Dan Gritofan	Škoda Fabia R5	Romanian Rally Championship
2018	(Romania) Bogdan Marisca	Ford Fiesta R5	Romanian Rally Championship
2019	(Romania) Sebastian Barbu	Škoda Fabia R5	Romanian Rally Championship
2020	(Romania) Simone Tempestini	Škoda Fabia R5	Romanian Rally Championship
2021	(Romania) Simone Tempestini	Škoda Fabia R5	Romanian Rally Championship
2022	(Romania) Simone Tempestini	Škoda Fabia R5	Romanian Rally Championship
2023	(Romania) Simone Tempestini	Škoda Fabia Rally2 evo	Romanian Rally Championship
