= François Delecour =

French rally driver (born 1962)

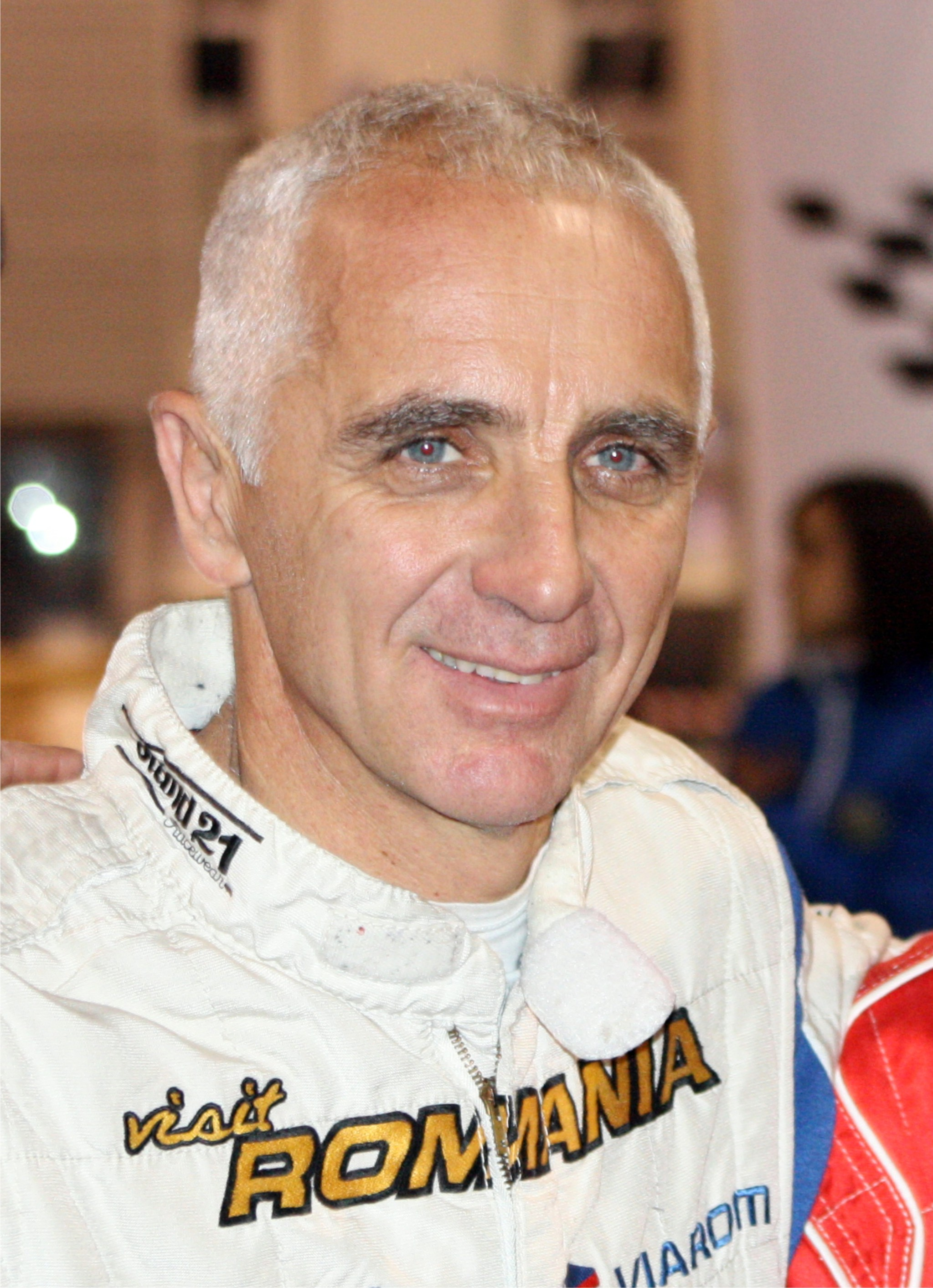
- François Delecour in 2014

Personal information
- Nationality: (France) French
- Full name: Francois Dominique Delecour
- Born: 30 August 1962 (age 64); Hazebrouck, France

World Rally Championship record
- Years active: 1984–2002, 2012, 2014–2017, 2022-2023
- Co-driver: (France) Anne-Chantal Pauwels (Monaco) "Tilber" (France) Daniel Grataloup (France) Catherine François (France) Dominique Savignoni (France) Sabrina De Castelli (France) Jean-Rodolfe Guigonnet
- Teams: Ford, Peugeot, Mitsubishi, Fiat
- Rallies: 107
- Championships: 0
- Rally wins: 4
- Podiums: 19
- Stage wins: 214
- Total points: 334
- First rally: 1984 Monte Carlo Rally
- First win: 1993 Rallye de Portugal
- Last win: 1994 Monte Carlo Rally
- Last rally: 2023 Monte Carlo Rally

François Dominique Delecour (born 30 August 1962) is a French rally driver.

== Biography ==
=== Career in World Rally Championship ===
Delecour began rallying in 1981, in the French national championship. He entered his first major event, the Monte Carlo Rally, three years later, driving a Talbot Samba. He was co driven by his then girlfriend Anne Chantal Pauwels. For 1985 and 1986, he drove in the Peugeot 205 Cup, finishing third in both seasons. This was enough to earn him a degree of support from the Peugeot works team for subsequent years, culminating in a full works drive in a Peugeot 309 in 1989 and 1990, in which year he finished ninth overall and first two-wheel-drive car on the Monte Carlo. He also competed with the team on the 1990 Paris-Tripoli-Dakar rally raid in a support-car role.

Delecour was then hired by the Ford team to contest the 1991 World Championship. The four-wheel-drive Ford Sierra Cosworth, introduced the previous season, was not regarded as fully competitive, but Delecour demonstrated a remarkable turn of speed on the Monte Carlo Rally. He took the lead from reigning world champion Carlos Sainz on the third day and seemed certain to win until he lost five minutes with suspension failure on the final night and dropped to third place. Delecour retired from the next three events he contested, but then took fourth and third places on the San Remo and Catalunya rallies and sixth on the final round of the series, the RAC Rally in Great Britain, to finish seventh in the driver's championship. Delecour remained with Ford for the 1992 season, and was joined by twice world champion Massimo Biasion. Results were generally better than in 1991, with second places for Biasion in Portugal and Delecour on the Tour de Corse. Delecour also took third place on the San Remo, leaving him sixth in the World Championship.

For 1993, the Sierra was replaced by the smaller and more agile Ford Escort RS Cosworth. Delecour immediately showed its potential by leading the Monte Carlo until the final night, with Biasion second. However, both lost out to a final-night charge by Didier Auriol, and finished second and third. Delecour at this time was still regarded as a specialist on asphalt rallies, but he finally established his reputation as an effective driver on all surfaces by winning the third round of the series, the Portuguese Rally, again with Biasion second. He won again in Corsica, giving him the championship lead. However, retirement in Greece and San Remo saw the title pass to Juha Kankkunen, although Delecour compensated somewhat by winning the Catalunya Rally and finishing a strong fourth on the RAC, giving him second place in the World Championship. His co-driver, Daniel Grataloup, was awarded the co-driver's championship for that year. After his strong showing in 1993, Delecour was widely regarded as the strongest contender for the 1994 world title, and he duly won the Monte Carlo Rally. However, he retired with engine failure in Portugal. A month later he was involved in a road accident, when the Ferrari F40 he was driving was hit, ironically by an amateur rally driver practicing for a local event. Delecour suffered severe leg injuries and was forced to miss the next four rounds of the series. He returned to action in Finland and finished fourth, before retiring from the final two events of the year.

At the end of 1994, the official Ford team was closed down, and cars were instead run by Belgian concern RAS Sport. Biasion left the team, leaving Delecour as lead driver, backed up by Bruno Thiry. However, the Escort was less competitive than in the previous year and he failed to win an event, although he finished second in Monte Carlo and Corsica. His final event for the Ford team was in Sweden in 1996.

After leaving Ford, Delecour was hired by Peugeot to head their campaign for the French Rally Championship, driving the Peugeot 306 kit-car. He finished third in the championship in both 1996 and 1997, winning several events outright along the way. Moreover, he also contested some of the asphalt rounds of the World Championship, where the Peugeot was fast enough to be a contender for outright victory. He finished fourth on both the 1996 and 1997 Tour de Corse. Subsequently, he was involved in the early years of the Peugeot 206 WRC project, which saw him return to the World Championship for the 1999 season. He did not win any events, but scored consistent top-ten finishes, including second place in Corsica and San Remo, the latter marred by acrimony between Delecour and team-mate Gilles Panizzi, who went on to win the event.

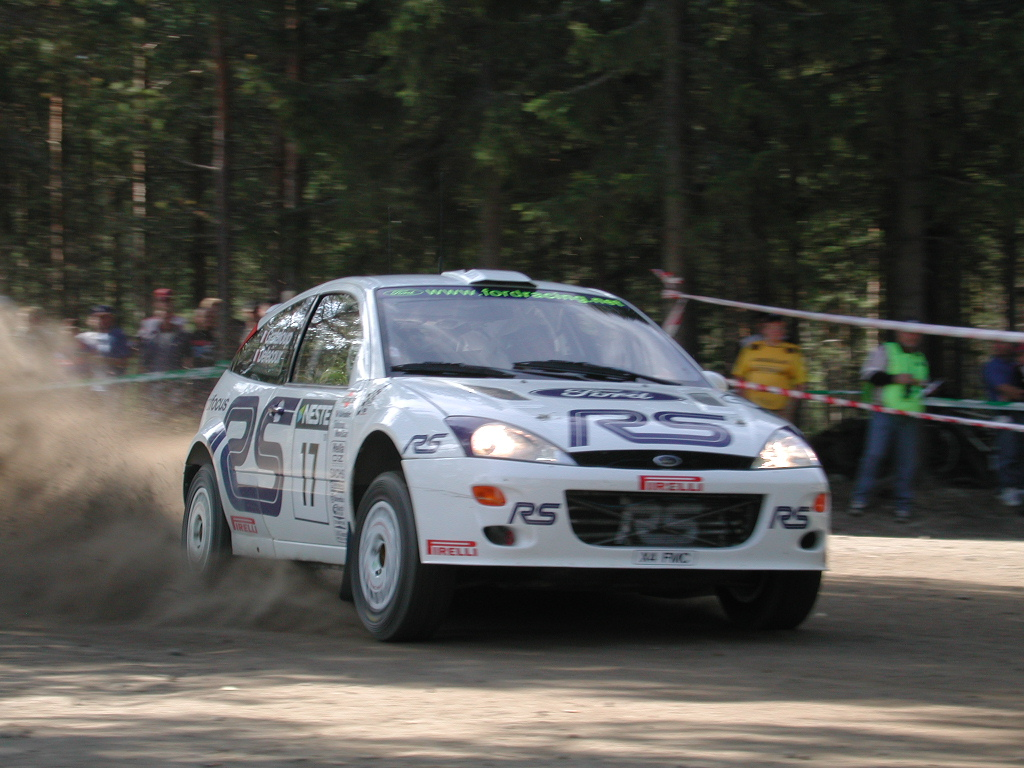
Delecour with a Ford Focus RS WRC 01 at the 2001 Rally Finland.

Delecour switched back to Ford for 2001. The Blue Oval's effort, however, was by now being masterminded not from long-time headquarters Boreham, but by Malcolm Wilson's M-Sport in Cumbria, which ran a third, alternatively liveried Ford Focus RS WRC 01 for Delecour. A shunt, nearly crippling for co-driver Daniel Grataloup, on his final outing in Australia threatened to mar his time at the team. But despite otherwise again proving a regular scorer, he was once again to change teams come the following year, this time to Mitsubishi to drive their still young first World Rally Car, he and Alister McRae being drafted in as replacements for both outgoing four-time World Champion, Tommi Makinen and his teammate Freddy Loix.

Unfortunately, both Delecour and McRae were to suffer as the Japanese marque's competitiveness continued to wane. During this time, Delecour again suffered a massive shunt during that year's Rally Australia. This time the accident had effectively ended Grataloup's top line career due to injuries he sustained as a result of the accident. Delecour, despite his accident, would go on to compete at the next event in Great Britain. This event was noted as Delecour's Mitsubishi left the road in the middle of the event causing him to lose his temper at his replacement co-driver Dominique Savignoni. After a comparatively unsuccessful season, Mitsubishi announced a sabbatical from the series until 2004, effectively bringing Delecour's world championship career to a close.

=== Later career and comeback in Monte Carlo ===
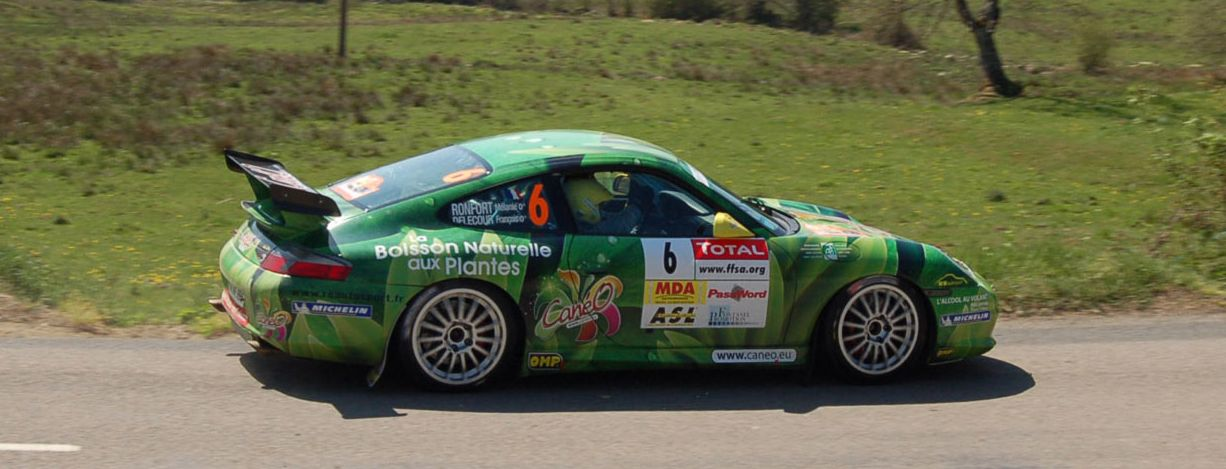
Delecour in Lyon-charbonnière Rally 2007

After his WRC career, Delecour did rally-raid with SMG V8 buggy and some racing with Porsche 996 GT3 RS. In 2011, 100th year of Monte Carlo rally, he returned to rallying with Peugeot 207 Super 2000 and finished on 5th place in Rallye Monte Carlo, which was part of IRC-Championship.

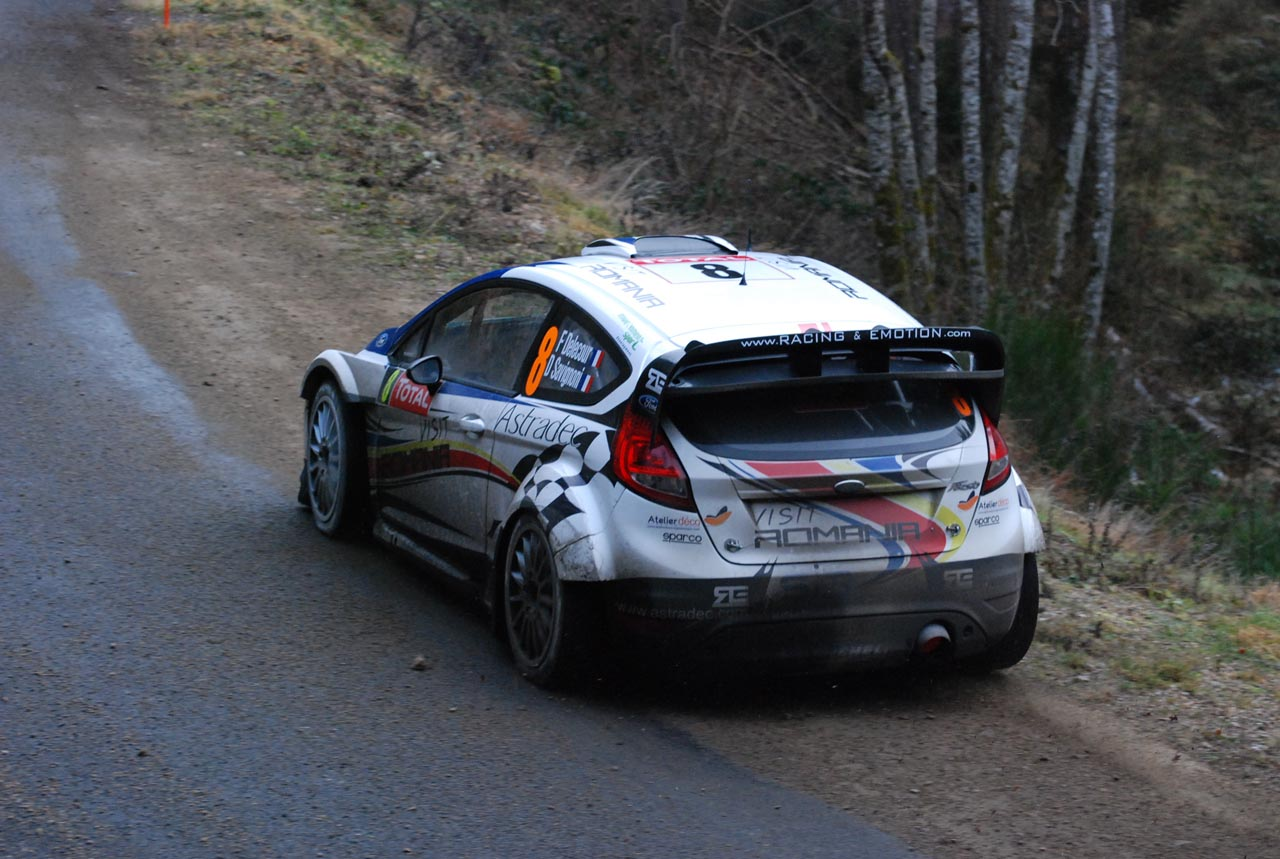
Delecour in Monte-Carlo Rally 2012

In December 2011, it was announced that Delecour would make a comeback to WRC. He ran the latest-spec Fiesta WRC in 2012 Monte Carlo Rally. In the rally Delecour finished 6th and drove some top 3 stage times during the event.

In 2012, Delecour also returned to the IRC-championship in Rally Corsica, in which he drove a Visit Romania-backed Renault Mégane RS in IRC Production Cup and IRC 2WD Cup. Delecour finished third in his class and said he would like to do more IRC rallies in the future. Delecour competed in 2012 in the Romanian Rally Championship, winning five rallies on the way to the title and also finishing third among the IRC drivers in the Sibiu Rally with his Peugeot 207 S2000, the Romanian event being part of the IRC championship Late 2012 Delecour announced he would take part in European Rally Championship with Peugeot 207 S2000 in 2013 and he will be co-driven by Dominique Savignoni. Delecour also defended his Romanian Rally Championship title in 2013.

In December 2013, it was announced that Delecour, after winning the Romanian championship for the second time, would take part in Rally Monte Carlo 2014 with M-Sport Ford Fiesta RS WRC. Unfortunately, he was forced to retire on the first stage because of a broken accelerator.

In 2014, Delecour continued participating in the Romanian Rally Championship and won the title for the third time. He also returned to WRC for 2014 edition of Rallye de France Alsace with Tuthill Porsche 911 RGT and finished 37th, after a small off that damaged the car's radiator. After the rally, Delecour told he would work for FIA R-GT Cup, a championship in which he wants to compete in 2015.

In early 2015, it was announced that Delecour would participate in FIA's new R-GT Cup series for GT cars in the World and European Rally Championships with a Porsche 911 run by Tuthill team. Rallies include Monte Carlo, Ypres Rally, Rally Germany, Rally Valais and the Tour of Corsica. In Monte Carlo, Delecour won his class and finished on 23rd place in overall results with his Porsche. In Ypres Rally, Delecour finished second in RGT Cup class. He finished second again in RGT cup event in Rallye Deutschland, but his overall position was 53rd after suffering from problems, including going off in the second day of the rally. Delecour won the next event, Tour de Corse, and secured the victory of FIA R-GT championship.

In 2023, Delecours entered the Monte Carlo WRC round in a privately entered Rally 2 Skoda. He finished tenth in his category.

=== European Rally Championship 2013 ===
In the first event of ERC 2013 in Jänner Rallye, Delecour finished seventh, after suffering a time penalty due a timing error by the crew and a spin and a puncture. In following event in Latvia, Delecour finished third. Delecour - sponsored by Visit Romania and therefore prioritizing his campaign in Eastern Europe over his ERC rallies if the events clash - decided to skip the ERC event Rally Islas Canarias El Corte Inglés in order to contest the Romanian Rally Championship Tess Rally Braşov, which he won. The next ERC event for Delecour was the Rally of Corsica, in which he finished fifth. In Sibiu Rally Romania, Delecour scored his second podium of his ERC season by finishing second, behind Jan Kopecký, while scoring top points for Romanian rally championship. He did not compete in other ERC events that year, but finished fourth in the Championship.

== WRC victories ==
#	Event	Season	Co-driver	Car
1	27° Rallye de Portugal	1993	Daniel Grataloup	Ford Escort RS Cosworth
2	37ème Tour de Corse – Rallye de France	1993	Daniel Grataloup	Ford Escort RS Cosworth
3	(Spain) 29° Rallye Catalunya-Costa Brava (Rallye de España)	1993	Daniel Grataloup	Ford Escort RS Cosworth
4	(Monaco) 62ème Rallye Automobile de Monte-Carlo	1994	Daniel Grataloup	Ford Escort RS Cosworth

== Career results ==
=== Complete WRC results ===
Year	Entrant	Car	1	2	3	4	5	6	7	8	9	10	11	12	13	14	Pos.	Pts
1984	François Delecour	Talbot Samba	MON; 67	SWE	POR	KEN	FRA	GRE	NZL	ARG	FIN	ITA	CIV	GBR			NC	0
1985	François Delecour	Peugeot 205 GTi	MON; Ret	SWE	POR	KEN	FRA	GRE	NZL	ARG	FIN	ITA	CIV	GBR			NC	0
1986	François Delecour	Peugeot 205 GTi	MON; Ret	SWE	POR	KEN	FRA	GRE	NZL	ARG	FIN	CIV	ITA	GBR	USA		NC	0
1987	François Delecour	Peugeot 205 GTi	MON; 20	SWE	POR	KEN	FRA	GRE	USA	NZL	ARG	FIN	CIV	ITA	GBR		NC	0
1990	Peugeot France	Peugeot 309 GTI	MON; 9	POR	KEN	FRA; Ret	GRE	NZL	ARG	FIN	AUS	ITA	CIV	GBR			NC	0
1991	Q8 Team Ford	Ford Sierra RS Cosworth 4x4	MON; 3	SWE	POR; Ret	KEN	FRA; Ret	GRE; Ret	NZL	ARG	FIN	AUS	ITA; 4	CIV	ESP; 3	GBR; 6	7th	40
1992	Ford Motor Co. Ltd.	Ford Sierra RS Cosworth 4x4	MON; 4	SWE	POR; Ret	KEN	FRA; 2	GRE; 5	NZL	ARG	FIN; Ret	AUS	ITA; 3	CIV	ESP; Ret	GBR	6th	45
1993	Ford Motor Co. Ltd.	Ford Escort RS Cosworth	MON; 2	SWE	POR; 1	KEN	FRA; 1	GRE; Ret	ARG	NZL; 2	FIN	AUS; 3	ITA; Ret	ESP; 1	GBR; 4		2nd	112
1994	Ford Motor Co. Ltd.	Ford Escort RS Cosworth	MON; 1	POR; Ret	KEN	FRA	GRE	ARG	NZL	FIN; 4	ITA; Ret	GBR; EX					8th	30
1995	R.A.S. Ford	Ford Escort RS Cosworth	MON; 2	SWE; Ret	POR; Ret	FRA; 2	NZL; 6	AUS; Ret	ESP; 4	GBR; Ret							4th	46
1996	Ford Motor Co. Ltd.	Ford Escort RS Cosworth	SWE; 11	KEN	IDN	GRE	ARG	FIN	AUS	ITA	ESP						NC	0
1997	Peugeot Sport	Peugeot 306 Maxi	MON	SWE	KEN	POR	ESP; EX	FRA; 4	ARG	GRE	NZL	FIN	IDN	ITA	AUS	GBR	19th	3
1998	Peugeot Sport	Peugeot 306 Maxi	MON; 10	SWE	KEN	POR	ESP; 8	FRA; 2	ARG	GRE	NZL	FIN	ITA; Ret	AUS	GBR		10th	6
1999	François Delecour	Ford Escort WRC	MON; 4														16th	3
1999	Peugeot Esso	Peugeot 206 WRC		SWE	KEN	POR	ESP	FRA; Ret	ARG	GRE; Ret	NZL	FIN; 9	CHN	ITA; Ret	AUS; Ret	GBR; Ret	16th	3
2000	Peugeot Esso	Peugeot 206 WRC	MON; Ret	SWE; 7	KEN	POR; 5	ESP; 7	ARG; 13	GRE; 9	NZL; Ret	FIN; 6	CYP; 3	FRA; 2	ITA; 2	AUS; 3	GBR; 6	6th	24
2001	Ford Motor Co. Ltd.	Ford Focus RS WRC 01	MON; 3	SWE; 5	POR; 5	ESP; 6	ARG; 7	CYP; Ret	GRE; 5	KEN; 4	FIN; Ret	NZL; 12	ITA; 6	FRA; 10	AUS; Ret	GBR	9th	15
2002	Marlboro Mitsubishi Ralliart	Mitsubishi Lancer WRC	MON; 9	SWE; 34	FRA; 7	ESP; 9	CYP; 13	ARG; Ret	GRE; 11	KEN; Ret							NC	0
2002	Marlboro Mitsubishi Ralliart	Mitsubishi Lancer WRC2									FIN; Ret	GER; 9	ITA; 10	NZL; 9	AUS; Ret	GBR; Ret	NC	0
2012	M-Sport Ford World Rally Team	Ford Fiesta RS WRC	MON; 6	SWE	MEX	POR	ARG	GRE	NZL	FIN	GER	GBR	FRA	ITA	ESP		18th	8
2014	François Delecour	Ford Fiesta RS WRC	MON; Ret	SWE	MEX	POR	ARG	ITA	POL	FIN	GER	AUS					NC	0
2014	François Delecour	Porsche 997 GT3											FRA; 37	ESP	GBR		NC	0
2015	François Delecour	Porsche 997 GT3	MON; 23	SWE	MEX	ARG	POR	ITA	POL	FIN	GER; 53	AUS	FRA; 19	ESP	GBR		NC	0
2016	François Delecour	Peugeot 207 S2000	MON; 16	SWE	MEX	ARG	POR	ITA	POL	FIN	GER	CHN	FRA	ESP	GBR	AUS	NC	0
2017	François Delecour	Fiat 124 Abarth Rally RGT	MON; Ret	SWE	MEX	FRA; 19	ARG	POR	ITA	POL	FIN	GER	ESP	GBR	AUS		NC	0
2021	François Delecour	Alpine A110 Rally RGT	MON; 25	ARC	CRO	POR	ITA	KEN	EST	BEL	GRE	FIN	ESP	MNZ			NC	0
2023	François Delecour	Škoda Fabia RS Rally2	MON; 19	SWE	MEX	CRO	POR	ITA	KEN	EST	FIN	GRE	CHL	EUR	JPN		NC	0

=== IRC results ===
Year	Entrant	Car	1	2	3	4	5	6	7	8	9	10	11	12	13	Pos.	Points
2011	Enjolras Sport	Peugeot 207 S2000	MON; 5	CAN	COR	UKR	YPR	AZO	ZLI	MEC	SAN	SCO	CYP			19th	10
2012	Renault Sport Technologies	Renault Mégane RS	AZO	CAN	IRL	COR; 15	ITA	YPR	SMR							25th	15
2012	Munaretto Sport	Peugeot 207 S2000								ROM; 3	ZLI	YAL	SLI	SAN	CYP	25th	15

=== European Rally Championship results ===
Year	Entrant	Car	1	2	3	4	5	6	7	8	9	10	11	12	Pos.	Points
2013	Kronos Racing	Peugeot 207 S2000	JÄN; 7^{3}	LIE; 3^{8}	CAN	AZO	COR; 5^{6}	YPR; DNS	ROM; 2^{9}	ZLÍ	POL	CRO	SAN	VAL	4th	75

=== FIA R-GT Cup results ===
Year	Entrant	Car	1	2	3	4	5	Pos.	Points
2015	François Delecour	Porsche 997 GT3	MON; 1	BEL; 2	GER; 2	FRA; 1	SUI; Ret	1st	86
2017	François Delecour	Fiat 124 R-GT	MON; Ret	FRA; 2	CZE	ITA	SUI	4th	18

=== Complete FIA European Rallycross Championship results ===
==== Division 2 ====
Year	Entrant	Car	1	2	3	4	5	6	7	8	9	10	11	ERX	Points
1992	François Delecour	Ford RS200 E2	GBR	AUT	POR	FIN	SWE	FRA; 3	IRE	BEL	NED	NOR	GER	23rd	15

Sporting positions
Preceded by Didier Auriol	Race of Champions; Champion of Champions; 1995	Succeeded by Didier Auriol
