= Bogdan Barbu =

Romanian rally driver

Bogdan Barbu (born 27 May 1980 in Braşov) is a rally driver from Romania. He made his rallying debut in 2005. In 2006, he won the ninth place in the Group H, third place in the Class H3 and first place in the Novice Competition of the Romanian Hill Climbing Championship. In 2008, he participated in the Romanian Rally Championship, driving a Renault Clio. After the first four rallies he occupied the first place in the novice competition.
