= Harry Hunt =

British endurance and rally driver

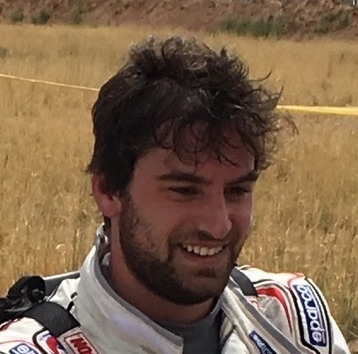
- Hunt in 2016
- Born: 3 September 1988 (age 38) London, England

Dakar Series career
- Debut season: 2007
- Current team: Mini
- Co-driver: Andy Schulz, Xavier Pansieri
- Starts: 54
- Championships: 2 (2010 and 2012)

Championship titles
- 2010, 2012: Intercontinental Rally Challenge - 2WD Champion

Awards
- 2010: Rookie of the Year

Harry Hunt (born 3 September 1988) is a British endurance and rally driver, and son of billionaire Jon Hunt. In 2016, he became the youngest British driver to take part in the Dakar Rally, finishing in 10th place out of 110 cars. He has participated in the Intercontinental Rally Challenge (IRC), winning the IRC 2WD class championship in 2010 and 2012.

== Early career ==
Hunt was first exposed to motorsports when his parents bought him a 50cc motorbike at the age of five, but because his feet could not reach the ground, he used a quad bike instead. He progressed to racing motocross bikes on the beach at Weston-super-Mare, which in turn led to "the natural progression to cars, driving off-road, then rally driving."

=== Rally career ===
In 2007, aged 19, Hunt bought a pre-owned two-wheel-drive Ford Fiesta ST rally car and began to compete in junior and national competitions.

==== 2009-2010 ====
In 2009, Hunt took part in the Malcolm Wilson Rally, as well as his first international rally, the Rallye San Remo in Italy. In 2010 Hunt won the JWRC Rookie Cup and won 1st place in the Intercontinental Rally Challenge two wheel drive (IRC 2WD) Championship.

==== 2011–2012 ====
Hunt won the 2011 Production Rally Championship in a Citroen DS3 R3T. In 2012 he became the IRC 2WD Champion for a second time, before taking a break from rallying.

==== 2015 ====
In April 2015, Hunt participated in the Abu Dhabi Desert Challenge, finishing third and beating several more experienced drivers, despite completing less than 40 kilometres of testing in the desert beforehand.

In May, Hunt was appointed as the brand Ambassador for MINI in preparation for Dakar 2016. In June, he debuted the Mini ALL4 racing car at the Goodwood Festival of Speed.

In July, Hunt placed 13th at the Baja Aragon rally in Spain. The event was round six of the FIA (Federation International De L’automobile) World Cup for Cross-Country Rallies and provided similar terrain to his ultimate goal in 2016, the Dakar Rally.

In October, Hunt finished in 7th place at the Rallye Oilibya du Maroc, in Morocco. A total of 84 cars took part, with only two Dakar rookies in the final top 10, both of whom were driving a MINI - one being Hunt and the other Hunt’s team-mate Mikko Hirvonen, winner of 15 world championship rallies. Hunt finished two places behind Hirvonen. During the event Hunt stopped to help fellow cross country rookie Sebastien Loeb, whose car had caught fire. Hunt later said of the incident: "I don’t think he’d actually noticed, but luckily we were able to use the sentinel warning system to let him know that something was wrong."

== Dakar Rally ==
=== Dakar Rally 2016 ===
At the age of 27, Hunt was the youngest British rally driver to complete the Dakar Rally in 2016, finishing in 10th place at his first attempt, out of a field of 110 cars. He also became the youngest British rally driver to complete the Dakar.

Hunt competed as part of the X Raid Mini ALL4 Racing Team, running against more experienced drivers and finishing one place behind Sebastien Loeb, the most successful WRC driver in history. Hunt said: "We drove at a good pace in all of the stages - not too quick, not too slow - and we managed to steer clear of any major problems...[the car] was amazing and withstood endless difficult terrain and my co-driver, Andy Schulz, was fantastic." (Schulz is the German driver who won the Dakar twice, with Jutta Kleinschmidt in 2001 and Hiroshi Masuoka in 2003).

Hunt calculated that he burnt over 66,000 calories while taking part. The two-week rally is considered to be one of motorsports toughest events, taking place over 10,000 km across sand dunes, salt flats, gravel roads, deep mud and rocks, in temperatures as high as 50 °C and at altitudes of up to 4,750 metres. As part of his race preparation Hunt trained in the Heat Chamber at St Mary's University, Twickenham.

Talking about the psychological impact of the event, Hunt said: "You're completely alone. You get a real sense [of that] when you come over some of the sand dunes and you look out and there's just no one for hundreds of miles. It's an adventure."

== Dakar 2017 plans ==
Hunt now plans to focus on the Dakar Series, including another attempt at the Dakar in 2017. He is due to take part in the Abu Dhabi Desert Challenge and Rallye Oilibya du Maroc again and "potentially in the summer the Silk Way Rally, which is Moscow to Beijing."

After taking part in the Dakar in the Mini All4 Racing team X-Raid, Hunt will be switching to the Peugeot 2008 DKR that took victory in 2016.

== Relationship with manufacturers ==
=== Mini ===
Hunt’s Dakar Mini ALL4 X-Raid is based on the Mini Countryman, but with four wheel drive and a 320 brake horsepower, three litre diesel engine delivering 700Nm of torque. Hunt describes it as "the best car to do Dakar in." The car cost £1 million and was built by the X-Raid factory in Germany. X-Raid is owned by the Quandt family, shareholders in Mini parent company BMW.

The car’s livery is a Union Flag design. Hunt was filmed driving the car on public roads in London in the build-up to his appearance at Goodwood. Hunt’s road car is also a MINI Countryman.

== Dakar Rally results ==
Year	Class	Vehicle	Position	Stages won
2016	Cars	Mini	10th	-

== Complete rally results ==
=== WRC results ===
Year	Entrant	Car	1	2	3	4	5	6	7	8	9	10	11	12	13	WDC	Points
2010	Harry Hunt Motorsport	Ford Fiesta R2	SWE; 43	MEX	JOR	TUR; 18	NZL	POR; 51	BUL; Ret	FIN; Ret	GER; Ret	JPN	FRA; 39	ESP; 27	GBR; 34	NC	0
2011	Harry Hunt Motorsport	Citroën DS3 R3T	SWE	MEX	POR; 35	JOR	ITA; 19	ARG; 21	GRE	FIN; Ret	GER; Ret	AUS; 20	FRA	ESP; Ret	GBR; 24	NC	0
2015	Harry Hunt Motorsport	Škoda Fabia S2000	MON	SWE	MEX	ARG	POR	ITA; 19	POL	FIN	GER	AUS	FRA	ESP	GBR	NC	0

=== IRC results ===
Year	Entrant	Car	1	2	3	4	5	6	7	8	9	10	11	12	13	Pos	Points
2010	Harry Hunt Motorsport	Ford Fiesta R2	MON; 34	CUR	ARG	CAN	SAR; 12	YPR; Ret	AZO	MAD	ZLI; 49	SAN; 48	SCO; 9	CYP; 19		48th	1
2011	Harry Hunt Motorsport	Citroën DS3 R3T	MON; 43	CAN; 29	COR; 20	YAL	YPR; Ret	AZO; Ret	ZLI	MEC	SAN; 22	SCO; Ret	CYP; Ret			23rd 2wd Cup	18
2012	Harry Hunt Motorsport I-Cars Motorsport YZD 207 Kronos Racing	Citroën DS3 R3T Peugeot 207 S2000	AZO; Ret	CAN; 18	IRL	COR; 20	ITA	YPR; Ret	SMR	ROM; 8	ZLI	YAL	SLI; Ret	SAN; 14	CYP; 10	1st 2wd Cup	-

=== ERC results ===
Year	Car	Entrant	1	2	3	4	5	6	7	8	9	10	11	ERC	Points
2012	Harry Hunt Motorsport	Citroën DS3 R3T	JÄN -	MIL; 12	CRO -	BUL -	YPR; Ret	BOS -	MAD -	CZE -	AST -	POL -	VAL -	-	-

=== PWRC results ===
Year	Entrant	Car	1	2	3	4	5	6	7	PWRC	Points
2011	Harry Hunt Motorsport	Citroën DS3 R3T	SWE -	POR; 13	ARG; 11	FIN; Ret	AUS; 9	ESP; Ret	GBR; 7	16th	8

=== JWRC results ===
Year	Entrant	Car	1	2	3	4	5	6	Pos.	Points
2010	Harry Hunt Motorsport	Ford Fiesta R2	TUR; 5	POR; 6	BUL; Ret	GER -	FRA; 7	ESP; 5	8th	34

== Early career ==
=== Germany DRM ===
	EVENT	Entrant	Car	Co-driver	Overall position	Class position
2009	(Germany) ADAC Eifel Rallye	Harry Hunt Motorsport	Ford Fiesta ST	Peter Loth	35	22. Germany (DRM); 9. Class DIV3

=== Ireland Tarmac ===
	EVENT	Entrant	Car	Co-driver	Overall position
2009	Ulster International Rally	Harry Hunt Motorsport	Ford Fiesta ST	Kris Killip	Retired

=== GB Rallies ===
	EVENT	Entrant	Car	Co-driver	Overall position	Class position
2009	Isle of Man International Rally	Harry Hunt Motorsport	Ford Fiesta ST	Kris Killip	15th	4. Class R3
2010	Bulldog International Rally of North Wales	Harry Hunt Motorsport	Ford Fiesta ST	Sebastian Marshall	Retired	-

=== BTRDA Forest Rally ===
	Event	Entrant	Car	Co-driver	Position
2011	Wyedean Forest Rally	Harry Hunt Motorsport	Ford Fiesta S2000	Robbie Durant	OTL
2012	Wyedean Forest Rally	Harry Hunt Motorsport	Mitsubishi Lancer Evo IX	Steve McPhee	10th
