= Rally San Marino =

Rally San Marino is a motorsport event for rally cars, held in San Marino with some stages located in the neighbouring Italian province Emilia-Romagna. The first rally was held in 1970 and currently is part of the Italian Rally Championship. The rally was also regular part of the European Rally Championship until the coefficient demise in 2004. In 2012 the rally was included in the Intercontinental Rally Challenge.

The only Sammarinese driver to win the rally until 2018 is Massimo Ercolani - he has won it 3 times.

== Previous winners ==
| Year | Driver | Car |
|---|---|---|
| 1974 | (Italy) Giulio Bisulli | Fiat 124 Abarth |
| 1979 | (Italy) Antonio "Tony" Fassina | Lancia Stratos |
| 1980 | (Italy) Adriatico Vudafieri | Fiat 131 Abarth |
| 1981 | (Italy) Antonio "Tony" Fassina | Opel Ascona 400 |
| 1982 | (Italy) Tonino Tognana | Lancia 037 Rally |
| 1983 | (Italy) Massimo Biasion | Lancia 037 Rally |
| 1984 | (Italy) Adriatico Vudafieri | Lancia 037 Rally |
| 1985 | (San Marino) Massimo Ercolani | Lancia 037 Rally |
| 1986 | (Italy) Fabrizio Tabaton | Lancia Delta S4 |
| 1987 | (Belgium) Patrick Snijers | Lancia Delta HF 4WD |
| 1988 | (Italy) Paola de Martini | Audi Coupé quattro |
| 1989 | (Italy) Giuseppe Grossi | Lancia Delta Integrale |
| 1990 | (Italy) Michele Gregis | Lancia Delta Integrale 16V |
| 1991 | (San Marino) Massimo Ercolani | Lancia Delta Integrale 16V |
| 1992 | (Italy) Gilberto Pianezzola | Lancia Delta Integrale 16V |
| 1993 | (Italy) Giuseppe Grossi | Lancia Delta HF Integrale |
| 1994 | (Italy) Andrea Navarra | Subaru Legacy RS |
| 1995 | (Italy) Giuseppe Grossi | Toyota Celica GT-Four |
| 1996 | (San Marino) Massimo Ercolani | Subaru Impreza 555 |
| 1997 | (Italy) Franco Cunico | Ford Escort RS Cosworth |
| 1998 | (Italy) Andrea Aghini | Toyota Corolla WRC |
| 1999 | (Italy) Andrea Navarra | Ford Escort WRC |
| 2000 | (Italy) Piero Longhi | Toyota Corolla WRC |
| 2001 | (Italy) Paolo Andreucci | Ford Focus RS WRC '00 |
| 2002 | (Italy) Andrea Aghini | Peugeot 206 WRC |
| 2003 | (Italy) Andrea Navarra | Subaru Impreza WRC '01 |
| 2004 | (Italy) Andrea Navarra | Subaru Impreza STi |
| 2005 | (Italy) Piero Longhi | Subaru Impreza STi |
| 2006 | (Italy) Piero Longhi | Subaru Impreza STi N12 |
| 2007 | (Italy) Piero Longhi | Subaru Impreza STi |
| 2008 | (Italy) Piero Longhi | Subaru Impreza STi |
| 2009 | (Italy) Paolo Andreucci | Peugeot 207 S2000 |
| 2010 | (Italy) Paolo Andreucci | Peugeot 207 S2000 |
| 2011 | (Norway) Andreas Mikkelsen | Škoda Fabia S2000 Evo 2 |
| 2012 | (Italy) Giandomenico Basso | Ford Fiesta RRC |
| 2013 | (Italy) Umberto Scandola | Škoda Fabia S2000 Evo 2 |
| 2014 | (Italy) Paolo Andreucci | Peugeot 207 S2000 |
| 2015 | (Italy) Paolo Andreucci | Peugeot 208 T16 |
| 2016 | (Italy) Giandomenico Basso | Ford Fiesta R5 |
| 2017 | (Italy) Umberto Scandola | Škoda Fabia R5 |
| 2018 | (San Marino) Daniele Ceccoli | Škoda Fabia R5 |
| 2019 | (France) Stéphane Consani | Škoda Fabia R5 |
| 2020 | (Bolivia) Marco Bulacia Wilkinson | Škoda Fabia R5 |
| 2021 | (Italy) Umberto Scandola | Hyundai i20 R5 |
