= Romanian Rally Championship =

- Country: Romania
- Drivers' champion: (Romania) Simone Tempestini

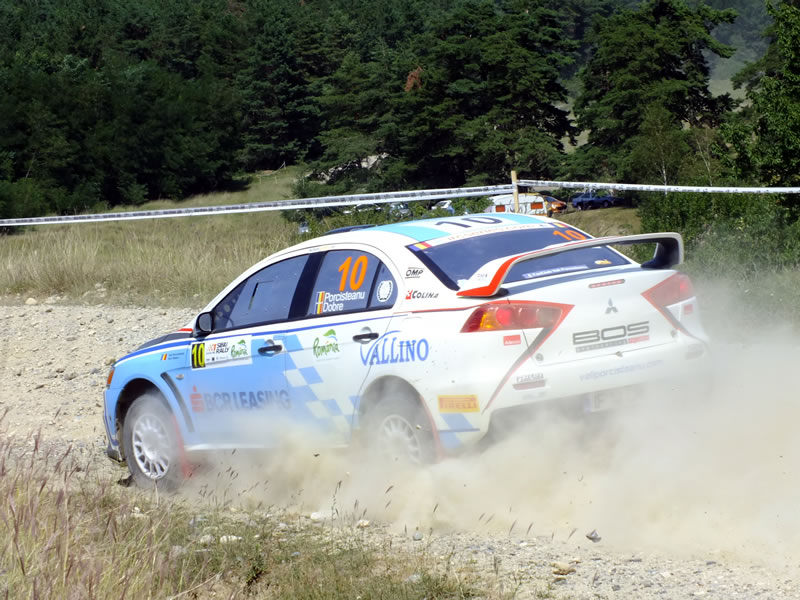
2011 champion Valentin Porcisteanu at the 2012 Sibiu Rally

Romanian Rally Championship is the annual rally series in Romania. It is organized by FRAS (Federaţia Română de Automobilism Sportiv).

== Champions ==
Season	Driver	Car
2026	(Romania) Simone Tempestini	Škoda Fabia RS Rally2
2025	(Romania) Simone Tempestini	Škoda Fabia RS Rally2
2024	(Romania) Simone Tempestini	Škoda Fabia RS Rally2
2023	(Romania) Simone Tempestini	Porsche 997 GT3 RGT; Škoda Fabia Rally2 evo
2022	(Romania) Simone Tempestini	Skoda Fabia R5; Porsche 997 GT3 RGT
2021	(Romania) Simone Tempestini	Skoda Fabia R5
2020	(Romania) Simone Tempestini	Skoda Fabia R5
2019	(Romania) Simone Tempestini	Hyundai i20 R5
2018	(Romania) Simone Tempestini	Citroën DS3 R5; Citroën C3 R5
2017	(Romania) Bogdan Marișca	Ford Fiesta R5
2016	(Romania) Simone Tempestini	Ford Fiesta R5; Citroën DS3 R3T Max
2015	(Romania) Simone Tempestini	Ford Fiesta R5
2014	(France) François Delecour	Peugeot 207 S2000; Subaru Impreza WRX STI N14
2013	(France) François Delecour	Peugeot 207 S2000; Subaru Impreza WRX STI N14
2012	(France) François Delecour	Peugeot 207 S2000
2011	(Romania) Valentin Porcișteanu	Mitsubishi Lancer Evo 9
2010	(Hungary) Gergő Szabó	Mitsubishi Lancer Evo 9
2009	(Hungary) Gergő Szabó	Mitsubishi Lancer Evo 9
2008	(Finland) Miettinen Jarkko	Mitsubishi Lancer Evo 9
2007	(Romania) Dan Gîrtofan	Subaru Impreza WRX STI N12
2006	(Romania) Constantin Aur	Mitsubishi Lancer Evo 9
2005	(Romania) Bogdan Marișca	Mitsubishi Lancer Evo 7
2004	(Romania) Dan Gîrtofan	SEAT Córdoba WRC
2003	(Romania) Mihai Leu	Hyundai Accent WRC
2002	(Romania) Constantin Aur	SEAT Córdoba WRC
2001	(Romania) Constantin Aur	SEAT Córdoba WRC
2000	(Romania) Constantin Aur	Toyota Celica Turbo 4WD
1999	(Romania) Constantin Aur	Toyota Celica Turbo 4WD
1998	(Romania) Constantin Aur	Toyota Celica Turbo 4WD
1997	(Romania) Constantin Aur	Toyota Celica Turbo 4WD
1996	(Romania) George Grigorescu	Renault Clio Williams
1995	(Romania) Constantin Aur	Audi S2
1994	(Romania) Heinz Goellner	VW Golf GTI
1993	(Romania) Ludovic Balint	Dacia 1325
1992	(Romania) Dorin Toma	Opel Kadett GSI
1991	(Romania) Ludovic Balint (Romania) Constantin Duval	
1990	(Romania) Ștefan Vasile	Dacia 1320
1989	(Romania) Ludovic Balint	Dacia 1310
1988	(Romania) Ștefan Vasile	Dacia 1410
1987	(Romania) Ludovic Balint	
1986	(Romania) Ludovic Balint	Dacia 1400 Sport
1985	(Romania) Florin Nuță	Dacia 1310
1984	(Romania) Ștefan Vasile	Dacia 1310
1983	(Romania) Gheorghe Urdea	Dacia 1300
1982	(Romania) Ludovic Balint	Dacia 1300
1981	(Romania) Ludovic Balint	Dacia 1300
1980	(Romania) Mircea Ilioaea	Dacia 1300
1979	(Romania) Ilie Olteanu	Dacia 1300
1978	(Romania) Ilie Olteanu	Dacia 1300
1977	(Romania) Ștefan Iancovici	Dacia 1300
1976	(Romania) Ștefan Iancovici	Dacia 1300
1975	(Romania) Laurențiu Borbely	
1972-1974	The Romanian Automobilism Sportiv Federation did not organize the National Rally Championship.	
1971	(Romania) Aurel Puiu	
1970	(Romania) Aurel Puiu	Renault 8 Gordini
1969	(Romania) Aurel Puiu	

== Statistics ==
Position	Driver	Titles	Season
1	(Romania) Simone Tempestini	11	2015, 2016, 2018, 2019, 2020, 2021, 2022, 2023, 2024, 2025, 2026
2	(Romania) Constantin Aur	8	1995, 1997, 1998, 1999, 2000, 2001, 2002, 2006
3	(Romania) Ludovic Balint	7	1981, 1982, 1986, 1987, 1989, 1991, 1993
4	(Romania) Ștefan Vasile	3	1984, 1988, 1990
4	(Romania) Aurel Puiu	3	1969, 1970, 1971
4	(France) François Delecour	3	2012, 2013, 2014
5	(Romania) Dan Gîrtofan	2	2004, 2007
5	(Romania) Bogdan Marișca	2	2005, 2017
5	(Romania) Ilie Olteanu	2	1978, 1979
5	(Romania) Ștefan Iancovici	2	1976, 1977
5	(Hungary) Gergő Szabó	2	2009, 2010
6	(Romania) Valentin Porcișteanu	1	2011
6	(Finland) Jarkko Miettinen	1	2008
6	(Romania) Mihai Leu	1	2003
6	(Romania) George Grigorescu	1	1996
6	(Romania) Heinz Göllner	1	1994
6	(Romania) Dorin Toma	1	1992
6	(Romania) Constantin Duval	1	1991
6	(Romania) Florin Nuță	1	1985
6	(Romania) Gheorghe Urdea	1	1983
6	(Romania) Mircea Ilioaea	1	1980
6	(Romania) Florin Hangu	1	1992
6	(Romania) Laurențiu Borbely	1	1975
