= Yalta Rally =

The Yalta Rally (also known as Yalta Rally Fest and Prime Yalta Rally) is a motorsport event for rally cars, located in Yalta, Ukraine at the Crimea peninsula. The first edition of the rally was held in 1986 and was held for 4 years, before it was canceled in the 1990s. In 2005 the Yalta Rally was revived as part of the Ukrainian Rally Championship. In 2011 the rally became part of the Intercontinental Rally Challenge with Juho Hänninen becoming the first international winner in the event. The event continued to be part of the IRC before its merger with the European Rally Championship in 2013.

Following the annexation of Crimea by the Russian Federation, the rally was cancelled. A revival of the event was scheduled in 2018 as part of the Russia Cup, but that event was cancelled as well.

== List of winners ==
Sourced from:

Year	Name	Winner	Car
1986	Yalta Rally	(Soviet Union) Ivars Čaune	VAZ 2105 VFTS
1987	Yalta Rally	(Soviet Union) Eugenijus Tumalevičius	VAZ 2105 VFTS
1988: Not Held
1989	Yalta Rally	Canceled	
1990	Yalta Rally	(Soviet Union) Sergey Alyasov	Lada Samara
1991	Rally Yalta-Krym	(Soviet Union) Nikolay Bolshikh	BMW M3
1992	Antika Rally	(Russia) Nikolay Bolshikh	BMW M3
1993–2001: Not held
2002	Antika Rally	(Russia) Stanislav Gryazin	Mitsubishi Lancer Evo VI
2003–2004: Not held
2005	life:) Yalta Rally International	(Ukraine) Yuriy Protasov	Subaru Impreza STi N8
2006	Nemiroff Yalta Rally	(Ukraine) Volodymyr Petrenko	Mitsubishi Lancer Evo IX
2007	Prime Yalta Rally	(Ukraine) Oleksandr Saliuk Jr.	Mitsubishi Lancer Evo IX
2008	Prime Yalta Rally	(Ukraine) Yuriy Protasov	Mitsubishi Lancer Evo IX
2009	Prime Yalta Rally	(Ukraine) Oleksandr Saliuk Jr.	Mitsubishi Lancer Evo IX
2010	Prime Yalta Rally	(Ukraine) Igor Chapovskyi	Subaru Impreza STi N12
2011	Prime Yalta Rally	(Finland) Juho Hänninen	Škoda Fabia S2000
2012	Prime Yalta Rally	(Turkey) Yağiz Avci	Ford Fiesta S2000
2013	WOG Yalta Rally Fest	(Kazakhstan) Oleksandr Saliuk Jr.^{1}	Škoda Fabia S2000
2014–2017: Not held
2018	Mriya Yalta Rally	Cancelled	

- ^{1} Oleksandr Saliuk Jr. raced with Kazakh racing license in 2013
