= 2011 Monte Carlo Rally =

Motor rally competition

2011 Monte Carlo Rally 79ème Rallye Automobile de Monte-Carlo
Round 1 of the 2011 Intercontinental Rally Challenge season
Next event →
- Host country: Monaco
- Rally base: Monte Carlo
- Dates run: January 19 – 22 2011
- Stages: 13 (337.06 km; 209.44 miles)
- Stage surface: Tarmac and ice
- Overall distance: 1,341.75 km (833.72 miles)

Statistics
- Crews: 120 at start, 54 at finish

Overall results
- Overall winner: Bryan Bouffier; Peugeot France

The 2011 Monte Carlo Rally, officially 79ème Rallye Automobile de Monte-Carlo was the first round of the 2011 Intercontinental Rally Challenge (IRC) season. The rally took place between January 19–22, 2011. The event marked the centenary of the creation of the Monte Carlo Rally, which was first held on January 21, 1911.

== Introduction ==
The rally started in Valence on Wednesday 19 January and covered over 1341 km including 337 km in thirteen special stages. Stages were run both in daylight and at night and included two passes through the famous Col de Turini on a Friday night. A full capacity 120 entries were registered for the event including Le Mans 24 Hours star Stéphane Sarrazin and WRC brothers Petter and Henning Solberg. This was in addition to the regular IRC participants; Jan Kopecký, Freddy Loix, Bruno Magalhães, Thierry Neuville, Guy Wilks and reigning champion Juho Hänninen.

Eurosport expanded their TV coverage of the event showing twelve of the thirteen stages live as part of a total of fourteen hours of television over the three days of the competition.

== Results ==
Bryan Bouffier won his first and only IRC rally after a tyre gamble on the second day proved fruitful and lifted him from seventh in the rally standings to the lead. He had a commanding lead of 50 seconds into the final day which proved too much for his rivals and led him to victory. Second went to Škoda's Freddy Loix and third place went to Guy Wilks, after Stéphane Sarrazin incurred a 30-second penalty for checking into service three minutes late after the final stage. Sarrazin finished fourth ahead of 1994 rally winner François Delecour, who was making his return to rallying after a lengthy absence.

=== Overall ===
Pos.	Driver	Co-driver	Car	Time	Difference	Points
1.	(France) Bryan Bouffier	(France) Xavier Panseri	Peugeot 207 S2000	3:32:55.6	0.0	25
2.	(Belgium) Freddy Loix	(Belgium) Frédéric Miclotte	Škoda Fabia S2000	3:33:28.1	32.5	18
3.	(United Kingdom) Guy Wilks	(United Kingdom) Phil Pugh	Peugeot 207 S2000	3:34:15.3	1:19.7	15
4.	(France) Stéphane Sarrazin	(France) Jacques-Julien Renucci	Peugeot 207 S2000	3:34:17.5	1:21.9	12
5.	(France) François Delecour	(France) Dominique Savignoni	Peugeot 207 S2000	3:34:18.0	1:22.4	10
6.	(Finland) Juho Hänninen	(Finland) Mikko Markkula	Škoda Fabia S2000	3:34:24.9	1:29.3	8
7.	(France) Nicolas Vouilloz	(France) Benjamin Veillas	Škoda Fabia S2000	3:37:43.4	4:47.8	6
8.	(Czech Republic) Jan Kopecký	(Czech Republic) Petr Starý	Škoda Fabia S2000	3:40:41.5	7:45.9	4
9.	(Italy) Giandomenico Basso	(Italy) Mitia Dotta	Peugeot 207 S2000	3:41:41.6	8:46.0	2
10.	(Finland) Toni Gardemeister	(Finland) Tomi Tuominen	Peugeot 207 S2000	3:42:04.6	9:09.0	1

=== Special stages ===
Day	Stage	Time	Name	Length	Winner	Time	Avg. spd.	Rally leader
Leg 1 (19 Jan)	SS1	10:05	Le Moulinon – Antraigues	36.87 km	(France) Stéphane Sarrazin	23:35.6	93.76 km/h	(France) Stéphane Sarrazin
Leg 1 (19 Jan)	SS2	11:40	Burzet – St Martial	41.06 km	(Finland) Juho Hänninen	22:39.6	108.72 km/h	(Finland) Juho Hänninen
Leg 1 (19 Jan)	SS3	14:11	St-Bonnet-le-Froid – St-Bonnet-le-Froid	25.22 km	(Finland) Juho Hänninen	12:40.0	119.46 km/h	(Finland) Juho Hänninen
Leg 1 (19 Jan)	SS4	16:20	St-Bonnet-le-Froid – St-Bonnet-le-Froid	25.22 km	(Belgium) Freddy Loix	12:37.2	119.90 km/h	(Finland) Juho Hänninen
Leg 2 (20 Jan)	SS5	12:23	St-Jean-en-Royans – Font d'Urle	23.05 km	(Finland) Juho Hänninen	11:51.0	116.71 km/h	(Finland) Juho Hänninen
Leg 2 (20 Jan)	SS6	13:04	Cimetiere de Vassieux – Col de Gaudissart	24.13 km	(France) Bryan Bouffier	12:50.0	112.82 km/h	(Finland) Juho Hänninen
Leg 2 (20 Jan)	SS7	16:07	St-Jean-en-Royans – Font d'Urle	23.05 km	(France) Bryan Bouffier	14:57.1	92.50 km/h	(France) Bryan Bouffier
Leg 2 (20 Jan)	SS8	16:48	Cimetiere de Vassieux – Col de Gaudissart	24.13 km	(France) François Delecour	21:16.7	68.04 km/h	(France) Bryan Bouffier
Leg 3 (21–22 Jan)	SS9	09:08	Montauban-sur-l'Ouvèze – Eygalayes	29.89 km	(France) Stéphane Sarrazin	17:45.3	101.01 km/h	(France) Bryan Bouffier
Leg 3 (21–22 Jan)	SS10	19:15	Moulinet – La Bollène Vésubie	23.41 km	(France) Nicolas Vouilloz	16:24.6	85.59 km/h	(France) Bryan Bouffier
Leg 3 (21–22 Jan)	SS11	19:58	Lantosque – Lucéram	18.81 km	(Italy) Giandomenico Basso	13:28.2	83.79 km/h	(France) Bryan Bouffier
Leg 3 (21–22 Jan)	SS12	23:25	Moulinet – La Bollène Vésubie	23.41 km	(France) Stéphane Sarrazin	16:08.8	86.99 km/h	(France) Bryan Bouffier
Leg 3 (21–22 Jan)	SS13	00:08	Lantosque – Lucéram	18.81 km	(France) Stéphane Sarrazin	13:08.9	85.84 km/h	(France) Bryan Bouffier
