= Constantin Aur =

Romanian rally driver (born 1963)

Constantin "Titi" Aur (born 25 December 1963 in Bârlad) is a Romanian rally driver.

Aur has won eight Romanian rally championships (1995, 1997, 1998, 1999, 2000, 2001, 2002, 2006) and is the first Romanian rally driver to participate in a full season of World Rally Championship in 2003. He scored two points in the ADAC Rallye Deutschland, to finish 19th in the 2003 Production Car World Rally Championship (PCWRC). Aur is a long-time friend of WRC driver Manfred Stohl of Austria.

In 2006, Aur won a record-breaking eighth national title driving a Mitsubishi Lancer Evo IX for the OMV-Petrom Rally Team, in the Romanian National Rally Championship (CNR), organized by the FRAS. In 2007, the 43-year-old rally veteran switched to Viola BkP rally team to defend last year's title, but the team lost sponsorship during the season. Aur won the 2007 Raliul Avram Iancu, his last overall win to this date.

In 2010, aged 47, Aur returned for a full season in the CNR, joining champion squad Jack Daniel's Rally Team, again in a Mitsubishi Lancer Evo IX.

== Results ==
=== WRC results ===
Year	Entrant	Car	1	2	3	4	5	6	7	8	9	10	11	12	13	14	15	16	Pos.	Points
2003	Stohl Racing	Mitsubishi Lancer Evo VII	MON	SWE; Ret	TUR	NZL; Ret	ARG	GRE; Ret	CYP; Ret	GER; 36	FIN	AUS; Ret	ITA	FRA	ESP	GBR			NC	0
2004	Balkan Racing	Škoda Fabia WRC	MON	SWE	MEX	NZL	CYP	GRE	TUR	ARG	FIN	GER	JPN	GBR; Ret	ITA	FRA	ESP	AUS	NC	0
