= Bogdan Marișca =

Romanian rally driver

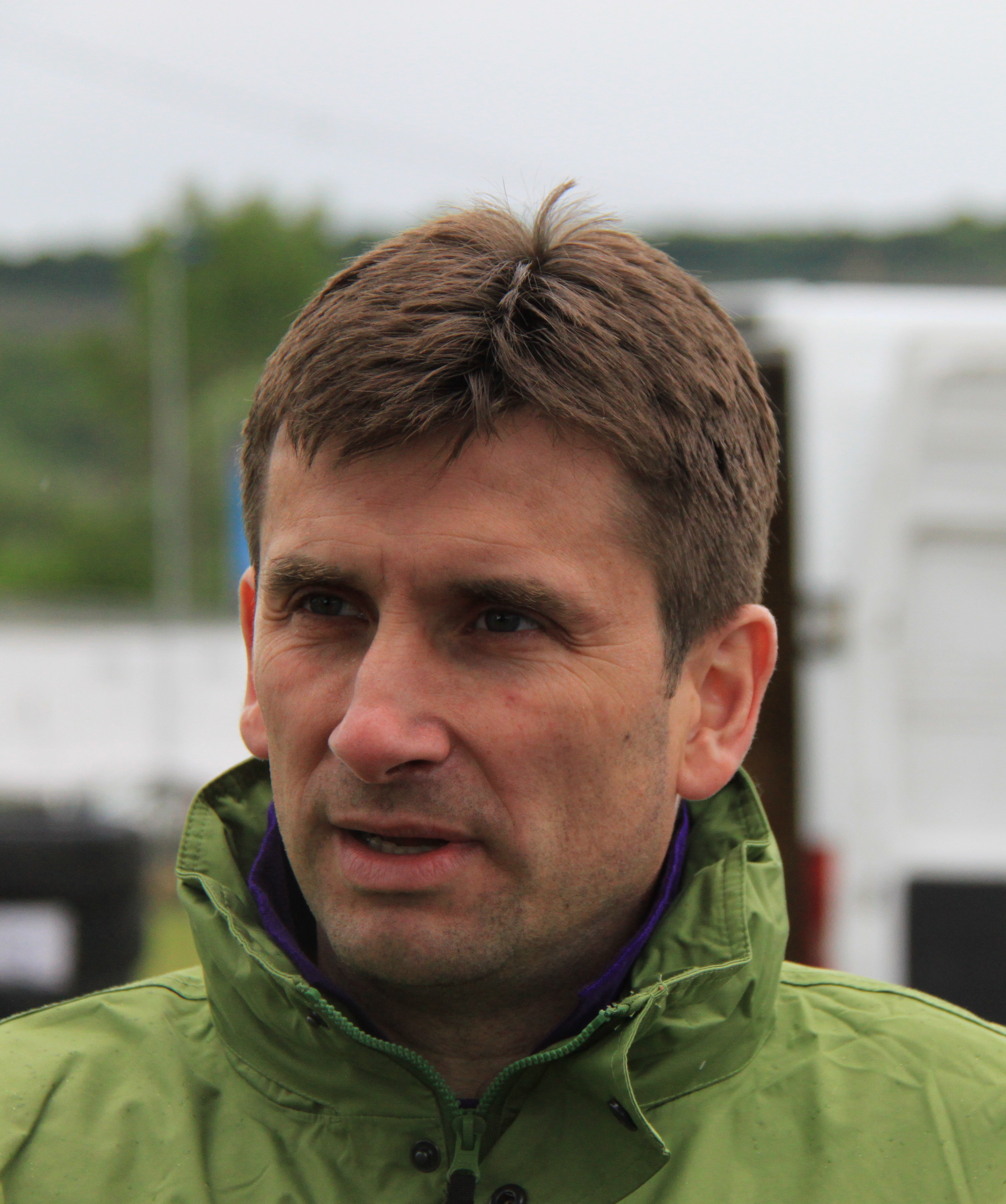
Bogdan Marișca (May 2010)

Bogdan Marişca (born 5 March 1970 in Cluj-Napoca) is a rally driver from Romania. He made his rallying debut in 1993, driving a Dacia 1410. In 2000 and 2001, he won the Group N title in the Romanian Rally Championship driving a Mitsubishi Lancer. In 2005, he won the overall title in the same championship driving for Rally Team OMV. In 2007, he lost the title to Dan Gârtofan in the last event of the year after leading the championship for a long time.
