= Bryan Bouffier =

French rally driver (born 1978)

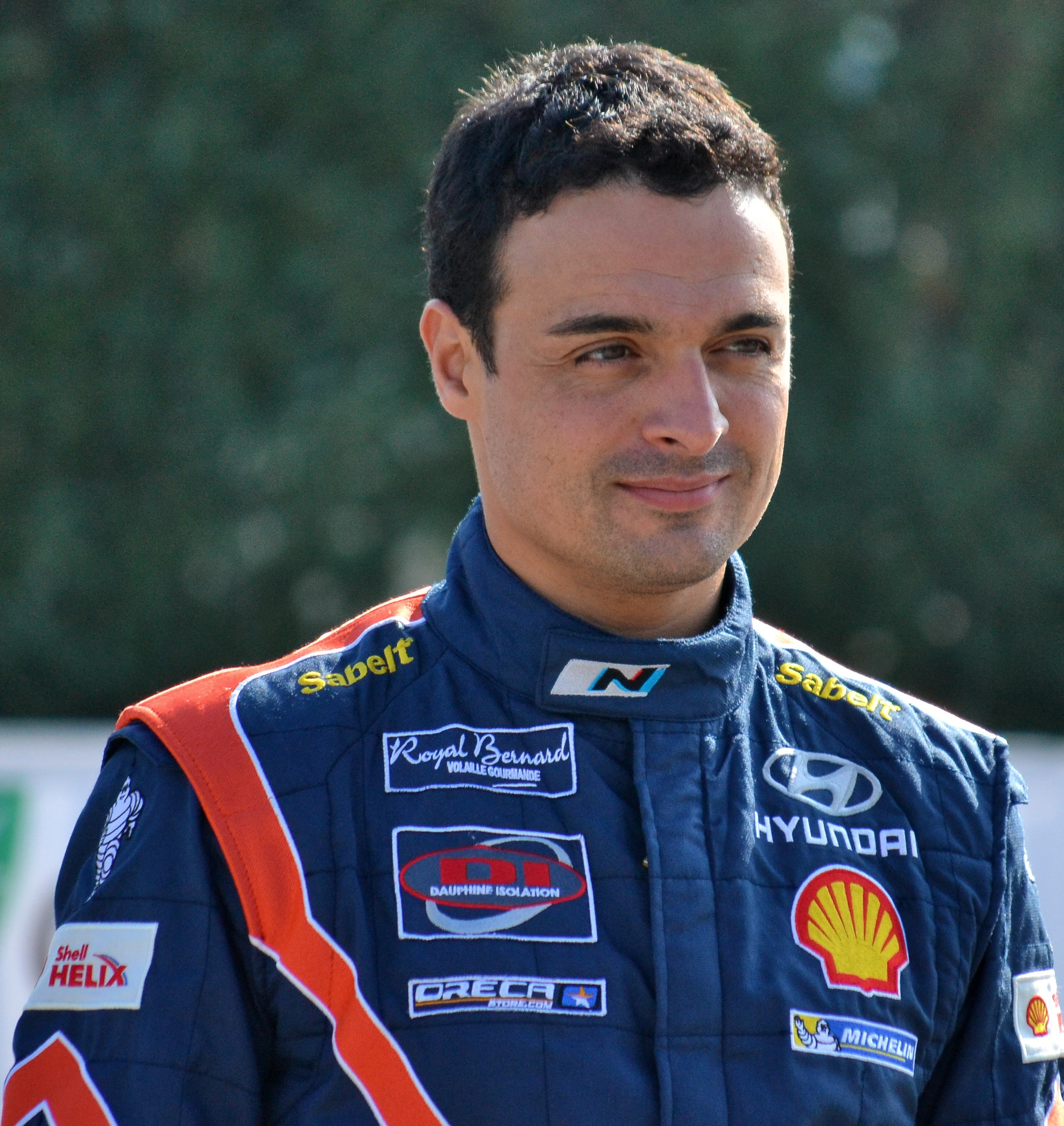
- Bouffier in 2014

Personal information
- Nationality: (France) French
- Born: 1 December 1978 (age 47)

World Rally Championship record
- Years active: 2007, 2012–2018, 2024
- Co-driver: (France) Mathieu Baumel (France) Xavier Panseri (France) Frédéric Vauclare (France) Thibault de la Haye (France) Victor Bellotto (France) Denis Giraudet
- Teams: PH Sport, M-Sport, Hyundai
- Rallies: 20
- Championships: 0
- Rally wins: 0
- Podiums: 1
- Stage wins: 3
- Total points: 39
- First rally: 2007 Rally d'Italia Sardegna
- Last rally: 2024 Monte Carlo Rally

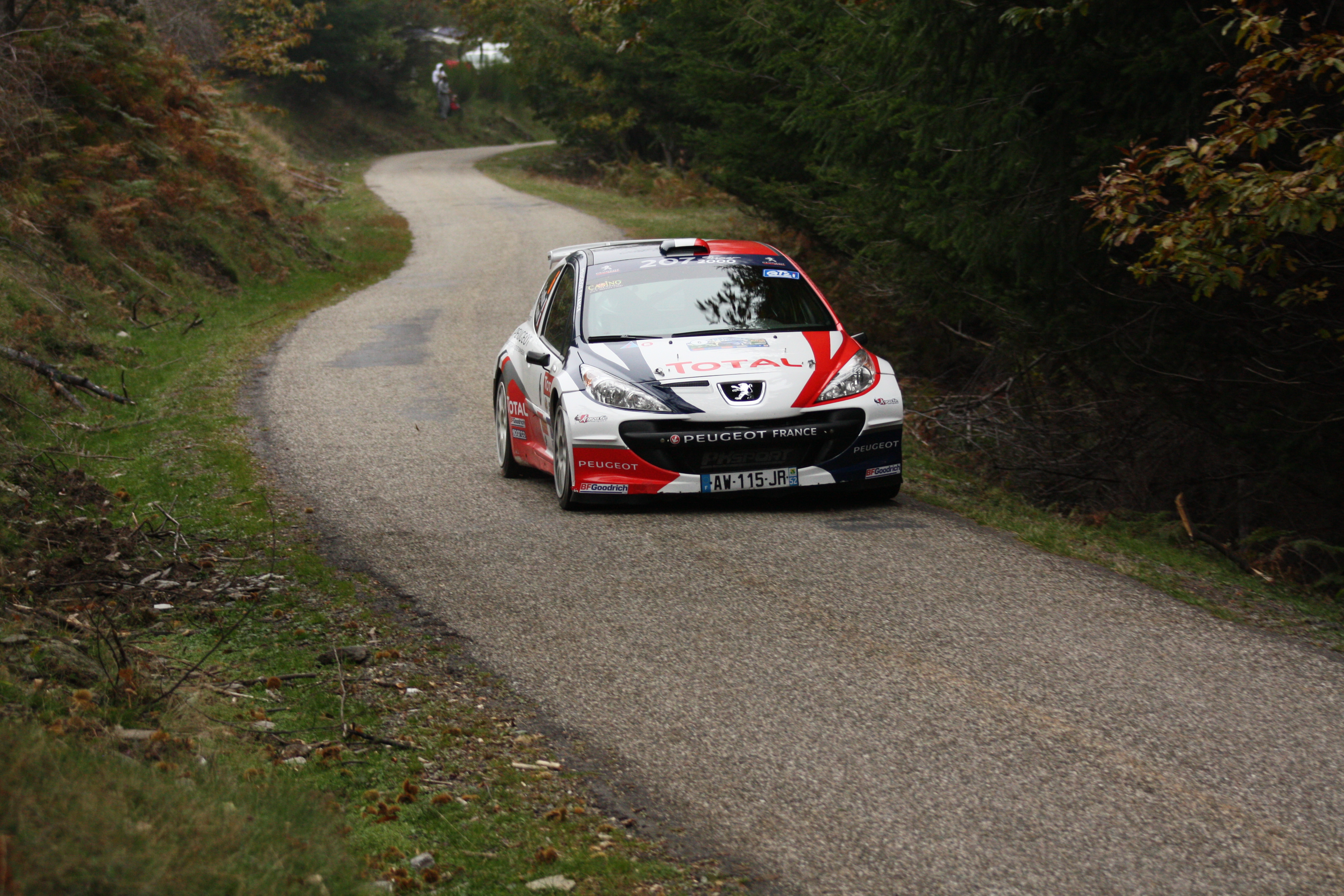
Bouffier competing in France in 2010

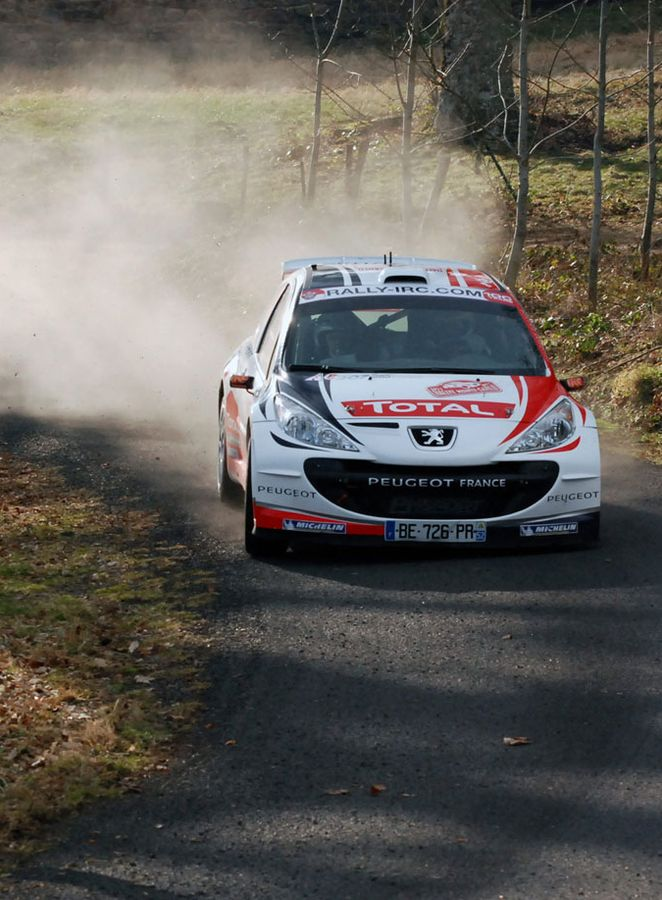
Bouffier at Rallye Monte Carlo 2011

Bryan Philippe Bouffier (born 1 December 1978) is a French rally driver. He is currently competing in the European Rally Championship with a Citroën DS3 S2000. He won the 2011 Monte Carlo Rally and the 2013 Tour de Corse.

== Career ==
In 2002, Bouffier won the Volant Peugeot 206 championship. In 2003, he became an official Peugeot Sport driver and spent three years competing in the French tarmac championship in a Peugeot 206 S1600. In 2006, he competed in the European Rally Championship for Peugeot Sport España, winning the Rally Antibes and finishing fifth in the standings.

Bouffier won three consecutive Polish Rally Championships in 2007, 2008 and 2009, driving a Peugeot 207 S2000 for Peugeot Sport Polska (2007–2008) and Mitsubishi Lancer Evo IX (2009). In 2010 he became French Rally Champion in the 207 S2000.

Bouffier is competing in the Intercontinental Rally Challenge in 2011 in a 207 S2000 for Peugeot France. He won the season opening Monte Carlo Rally after climbing from seventh to first when he made better tyre choices than his rivals in sudden snowfall.

== Results ==
=== WRC results ===
Year	Entrant	Car	1	2	3	4	5	6	7	8	9	10	11	12	13	14	15	16	WDC	Pts
2007	PH Sport	Citroën C2 R2	MON	SWE	NOR	MEX	POR	ARG	ITA; 29	GRE	FIN	DEU	NZL	ESP	FRA	JPN	IRE	GBR	-	0
2012	Bryan Bouffier	Peugeot 207 S2000	MON; 15	SWE	MEX	POR	ARG	GRE	NZL	FIN	DEU	GBR	FRA	ITA	ESP				-	0
2013	Bryan Bouffier	Citroën DS3 WRC	MON; 5	SWE	MEX														14th	10
2013	Bryan Bouffier	Citroën DS3 R3T				POR; 13	ARG	GRE	ITA; 31	FIN; WD	GER	AUS	FRA	ESP	GBR; Ret				14th	10
2014	M-Sport World Rally Team	Ford Fiesta RS WRC	MON; 2	SWE	MEX	POR	ARG	ITA											12th	20
2014	Bryan Bouffier	Ford Fiesta R5							POL; 14	FIN									12th	20
2014	Hyundai Motorsport N	Hyundai i20 WRC									GER; Ret	AUS	FRA; 9	ESP	GBR				12th	20
2015	M-Sport World Rally Team	Ford Fiesta RS WRC	MON; Ret	SWE	MEX	ARG	POR	ITA	POL	FIN			FRA; 8	ESP	GBR				23rd	4
2015	Bryan Bouffier	Peugeot 208 T16									GER; Ret	AUS							23rd	4
2016	M-Sport World Rally Team	Ford Fiesta RS WRC	MON; Ret	SWE	MEX	ARG	POR	ITA	POL	FIN	GER	CHN; C							NC	0
2016	Bryan Bouffier	Citroën DS3 R5											FRA; Ret	ESP	GBR	AUS			NC	0
2017	Gemini Clinic Rally Team	Ford Fiesta R5	MON; 10	SWE	MEX	FRA; Ret	ARG	POR	ITA	POL	FIN	GER	ESP	GBR	AUS				26th	1
2018	M-Sport Ford	Ford Fiesta WRC	MON; 8	SWE	MEX	FRA; Ret	ARG	POR	ITA	FIN	GER	TUR	GBR	ESP	AUS				19th	4
2024	Bryan Bouffier	Toyota GR Yaris Rally2	MON; 56	SWE	KEN	CRO	POR	ITA	POL	LAT	FIN	GRE	CHL	EUR	JPN				NC*	0*

* Season still in progress.

==== JWRC results ====
Year	Entrant	Car	1	2	3	4	5	6	7	Pos.	Pts
2007	PH Sport	Citroën C2 R2	NOR	POR	ITA; 7	FIN	DEU	ESP	FRA	20th	2

==== WRC-2 results ====
Year	Entrant	Car	1	2	3	4	5	6	7	8	9	10	11	12	13	Pos.	Pts
2017	Gemini Clinic Rally Team	Ford Fiesta R5	MON; 3	SWE	MEX	FRA; Ret	ARG	POR	ITA	POL	FIN	GER	ESP	GBR	AUS	21st	15
2024	Bryan Bouffier	Toyota GR Yaris Rally2	MON; 18	SWE	KEN	CRO	POR	ITA	POL	LAT	FIN	GRE	CHL	EUR	JPN	NC*	0*

* Season still in progress.

==== WRC 3 results ====
Year	Entrant	Car	1	2	3	4	5	6	7	8	9	10	11	12	13	Pos.	Pts
2013	Bryan Bouffier	Citroën DS3 R3T	MON	SWE	MEX	POR; 1	ARG	GRE	ITA; 8	FIN; WD	GER	AUS	FRA	ESP	GBR; Ret	6th	29

=== IRC results ===
Year	Entrant	Car	1	2	3	4	5	6	7	8	9	10	11	12	13	Pos.	Pts
2008	Peugeot Sport Polska	Peugeot 207 S2000	IST	POR	YPR	RUS	MAD	ZLI; 3	AST	SAN	VAL; 4	CHN				9th	11
2009	Bryan Bouffier	Proton Satria Neo S2000	MON	CUR	SAF	AZO	YPR	RUS	MAD	ZLI; Ret	AST	ITA	SCO			-	0
2010	Tommi Mäkinen Racing	Subaru Impreza WRX STi	MON; Ret													-	0
2010	Bryan Bouffier	Peugeot 207 S2000		CUR	ARG	CAN	SAR	YPR	AZO	MAD	ZLI; 10	SAN; 12	SCO	CYP; Ret		-	0
2011	Peugeot France	Peugeot 207 S2000	MON; 1	CAN; 7	COR; Ret	YAL; 2	YPR; DSQ	AZO; 4	ZLI; Ret	MEC; 4	SAN; 3	SCO; 3	CYP			6th	110.5
2012	Bryan Bouffier	Peugeot 207 S2000	AZO; 3	CAN	IRL	COR; 4	ITA	YPR	SMR	ROM	ZLI	YAL	SLI			12th	27
2012	Team Peugeot Total	Peugeot 208 R2												SAN; 15	CYP	12th	27

† Ineligible to score points.

=== European Rally Championship results ===
Year	Entrant	Car	1	2	3	4	5	6	7	8	9	10	11	12	Pos.	Pts
2013	Ateneo	Peugeot 207 S2000	JÄN; 2^{13}	LIE	CAN	AZO; DNS	COR; 1^{13}	YPR; 2^{12}	ROM; Ret	ZLÍ; DNS	POL; 2^{12}	CRO	SAN; 4^{8}	VAL	2nd	149
2014	Bryan Bouffier	Citroën DS3 RRC	JÄN	LIE; Ret	GRE; 2^{13}	IRE	AZO	YPR	EST	CZE	CYP	ROM	VAL	COR; 2^{12}	7th	61
