= Intercontinental Rally Challenge =

2006–2012 rallying championship series

- Category: Super 2000; Group N
- Country: International
- Inaugural season: 2006
- Folded: 2012
- Drivers: Varied from event to event
- Teams: 8 (manufacturers)
- Tyre suppliers: Michelin; Yokohama
- Last Drivers' champion: Andreas Mikkelsen
- Last Makes' champion: Škoda
- Official website: ircseries.com

The Intercontinental Rally Challenge was an FIA-sanctioned rallying series organised by SRW Events and Eurosport Events, and aimed to "give new opportunities to young or amateur rally drivers competing in recognised regional and international rallies, while offering organisers an innovative TV format concept, created by Eurosport." The series focused on Group N and Group A spec cars up to 2000 cc, including Super 2000, R4, R2 and R3.

The series began in 2006 under the name International Rally Challenge, adopting the name, Intercontinental Rally Challenge in 2007. The 2012 season was the final season of the series: from 2013, the series promoter Eurosport Events was awarded responsibility for organising the rival European Rally Championship by the FIA, and the two competing series were effectively merged.

== Champions ==
| Season | Champion driver | Co-driver | Car | Champion manufacturer | IRC 2WD Cup | 2WD Champion manufacturer |
|---|---|---|---|---|---|---|
| 2006 | (Italy) Giandomenico Basso | (Italy) Mitia Dotta | Fiat Punto Abarth S2000 | (Italy) FIAT | − | − |
| 2007 | (Spain) Enrique García-Ojeda | (Spain) Jordi Barrabés | Peugeot 207 S2000 | (France) Peugeot | − | − |
| 2008 | (France) Nicolas Vouilloz | (France) Nicolas Klinger | Peugeot 207 S2000 | (France) Peugeot | (Italy) Marco Cavigioli | (France) Peugeot |
| 2009 | (United Kingdom) Kris Meeke | (Republic of Ireland) Paul Nagle | Peugeot 207 S2000 | (France) Peugeot | (France) Denis Millet | (France) Peugeot |
| 2010 | (Finland) Juho Hänninen | (Finland) Mikko Markkula | Škoda Fabia S2000 | (Czech Republic) Škoda | (United Kingdom) Harry Hunt | (France) Peugeot |
| 2011 | (Norway) Andreas Mikkelsen | (Norway) Ola Fløene | Škoda Fabia S2000 | (Czech Republic) Škoda | (France) Jean-Michel Raoux | (Japan) Honda |
| 2012 | (Norway) Andreas Mikkelsen | (Norway) Ola Fløene | Škoda Fabia S2000 | (Czech Republic) Škoda | (United Kingdom) Harry Hunt | (France) Renault |

== Event winners ==
Drivers
| | Driver | Total |
|---|---|---|
| 1 | (Finland) Juho Hänninen | 11 |
| 2 | (Italy) Giandomenico Basso | 8 |
| 3 | (Czech Republic) Jan Kopecký | 7 |
| 3 | (Belgium) Freddy Loix | 7 |
| 5 | (United Kingdom) Kris Meeke | 5 |
| 6 | (Norway) Andreas Mikkelsen | 4 |
| 6 | (France) Nicolas Vouilloz | 4 |
| 6 | (Italy) Luca Rossetti | 4 |
| 9 | (Qatar) Nasser Al-Attiyah | 2 |
| 9 | (Belgium) Thierry Neuville | 2 |
| 9 | (Italy) Paolo Andreucci | 2 |
| 12 | (Bulgaria) Dimitar Iliev | 1 |
| 12 | (Turkey) Yagiz Avci | 1 |
| 12 | (Spain) Dani Sordo | 1 |
| 12 | (France) Bryan Bouffier | 1 |
| 12 | (Portugal) Bruno Magalhães | 1 |
| 12 | (Finland) Mikko Hirvonen | 1 |
| 12 | (United Kingdom) Guy Wilks | 1 |
| 12 | (Kenya) Carl Tundo | 1 |
| 12 | (France) Sébastien Ogier | 1 |
| 12 | (Finland) Jarkko Miettinen | 1 |
| 12 | (United Kingdom) David Higgins | 1 |
| 12 | (Finland) Anton Alén | 1 |
| 12 | (Italy) Andrea Navarra | 1 |
| 12 | (United Kingdom) Alister McRae | 1 |

Manufacturers
| | Manufacturer | Total |
|---|---|---|
| 1 | (Czech Republic) Škoda | 27 |
| 2 | (France) Peugeot | 23 |
| 3 | (Italy) Abarth | 9 |
| 4 | (United Kingdom) Ford | 6 |
| 5 | (Japan) Mitsubishi | 4 |
| 6 | (United Kingdom) Mini | 1 |

Cars
| | Car | Total |
|---|---|---|
| 1 | Škoda Fabia S2000 | 27 |
| 2 | Peugeot 207 S2000 | 23 |
| 3 | Fiat Abarth Grande Punto S2000 | 9 |
| 4 | Ford Fiesta RRC | 3 |
| 4 | Ford Fiesta S2000 | 3 |
| 4 | Mitsubishi Lancer Evo IX | 3 |
| 7 | Mini John Cooper Works RRC | 1 |
| 7 | Mitsubishi Lancer Evo VIII | 1 |

== See also ==
- List of Intercontinental Rally Challenge rallies
- European Rally Championship
- World Rally Championship
- World Rally Championship-2
- Super 2000 World Rally Championship
- European Touring Car Cup
- European Touring Car Championship
- World Touring Car Championship
- World Touring Car Cup
