= Oleksiy Tamrazov =

Ukrainian rally driver (born 1975)

Personal information
- Nationality: (Ukraine) Ukrainian
- Born: 23 January 1975 (age 51)

World Rally Championship record
- Years active: 2007–2009, 2012–2013, 2016
- Co-driver: (Ukraine) Ivan German (Ukraine) Oleksandr Skochyk (Ukraine) Oleksandr Gorbik (Italy) Nicola Arena (Ukraine) Pavlo Cherepin
- Rallies: 9
- Championships: 0
- Rally wins: 0
- Podiums: 0
- Stage wins: 0
- Total points: 0
- First rally: 2007 Wales Rally GB
- Last rally: 2016 Rally Finland

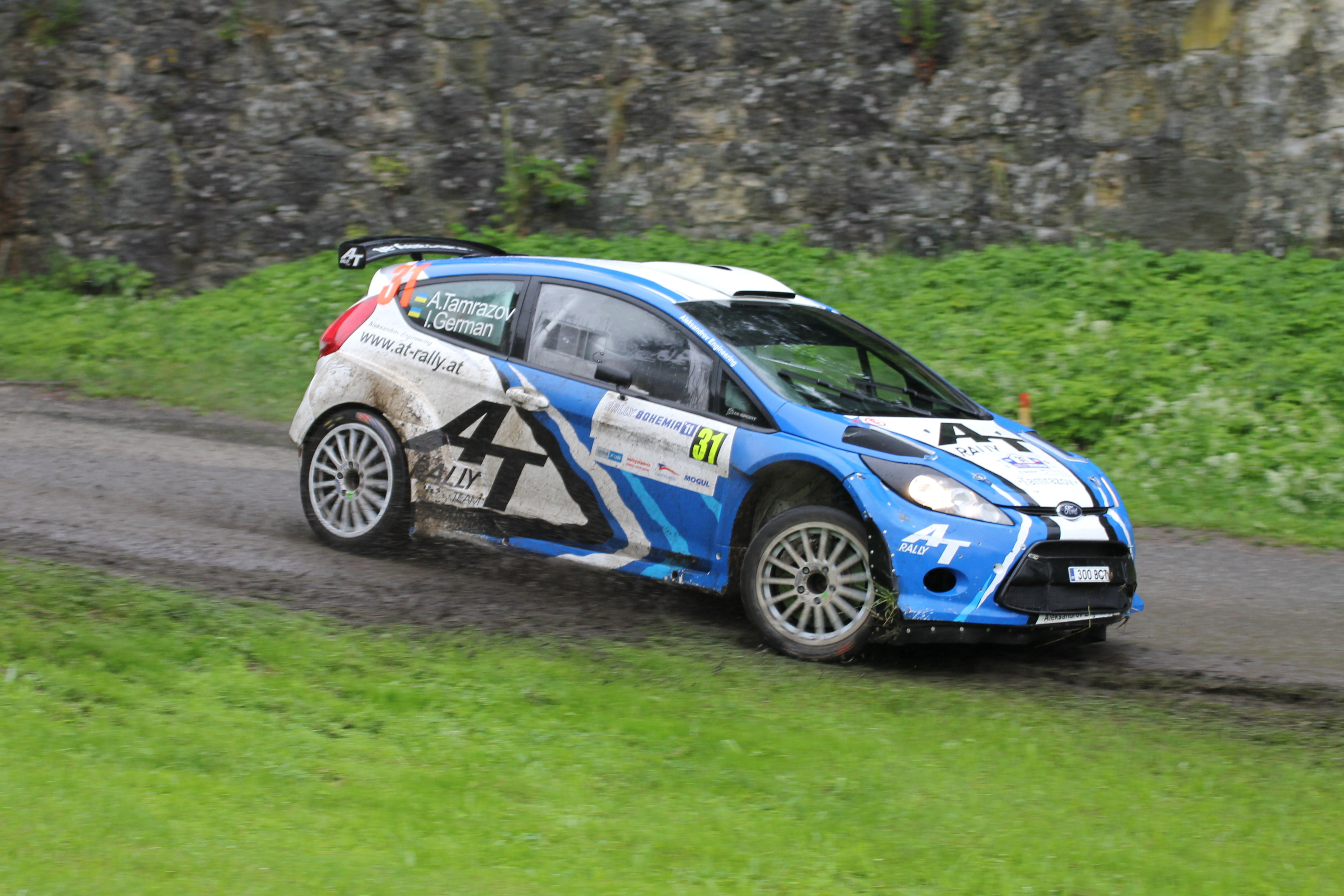
Tamrazov driving a Ford Fiesta S2000 at the 2011 Rally Bohemia.

Oleksiy Tamrazov (Ukrainian: Олексій Тамразов, born 23 January 1975) is a Ukrainian former rally driver.

== WRC results ==
Year	Entrant	Car	1	2	3	4	5	6	7	8	9	10	11	12	13	14	15	16	WDC	Points
2007	Oleksiy Tamrazov	Subaru Impreza WRX STi	MON	SWE	NOR	MEX	POR	ARG	ITA	GRE	FIN	GER	NZL	ESP	FRA	JPN	IRE	GBR; Ret	NC	0
2008	Oleksiy Tamrazov	Subaru Impreza WRX	MON	SWE	MEX	ARG	JOR	ITA	GRE	TUR	FIN	GER	NZL	ESP	FRA	JPN	GBR; Ret		NC	0
2009	Oleksiy Tamrazov	Subaru Impreza STi	IRE	NOR	CYP	POR	ARG	ITA	GRE	POL; Ret	FIN	AUS	ESP	GBR					NC	0
2012	Oleksiy Tamrazov	Ford Fiesta RS WRC	MON	SWE	MEX	POR	ARG	GRE; 18	NZL										NC	0
2012	Oleksiy Tamrazov	Ford Fiesta S2000								FIN; 31	GER	GBR	FRA	ITA	ESP				NC	0
2013	Oleksiy Tamrazov	Ford Fiesta RS WRC	MON	SWE; 32	MEX	POR	ARG	GRE; 14	ITA	FIN	GER	AUS	FRA	ESP	GBR				NC	0
2016	Oleksiy Tamrazov	Ford Fiesta R5	MON	SWE	MEX	ARG	POR	ITA	POL; 46										NC	0
2016	Oleksiy Tamrazov	Ford Fiesta RS WRC								FIN; Ret	GER	CHN; C	FRA	ESP	GBR	AUS			NC	0

== Complete IRC results ==
Year	Entrant	Car	1	2	3	4	5	6	7	8	9	10	11	12	13	WDC	Points
2009	(Ukraine) Oleksiy Tamrazov	Mitsubishi Lancer Evo IX	MON	BRA	KEN	POR	BEL	RUS	POR	CZE; Ret	ESP	ITA	SCO			–	0
2010	(Ukraine) Oleksiy Tamrazov	Ford Fiesta S2000	MON	CUR	ARG	CAN	SAR	YPR	AZO	MAD	ZLI; Ret	SAN	SCO	CYP		–	0
2011	(Ukraine) Oleksiy Tamrazov	Ford Fiesta S2000	MON	CAN	COR; Ret	YAL; 15	YPR	AZO	ZLI; 63	MEC	SAN	SCO	CYP			–	0
2012	Dream Team Ukraine	Ford Fiesta S2000	AZO; Ret	CAN; Ret	IRL	COR; Ret	MEC	YPR	SMR	ROM	ZLI	YAL	SLI	SAN	CYP	–*	0*

* Season still in progress.
