= Julien Maurin =

French rally driver (born 1985)

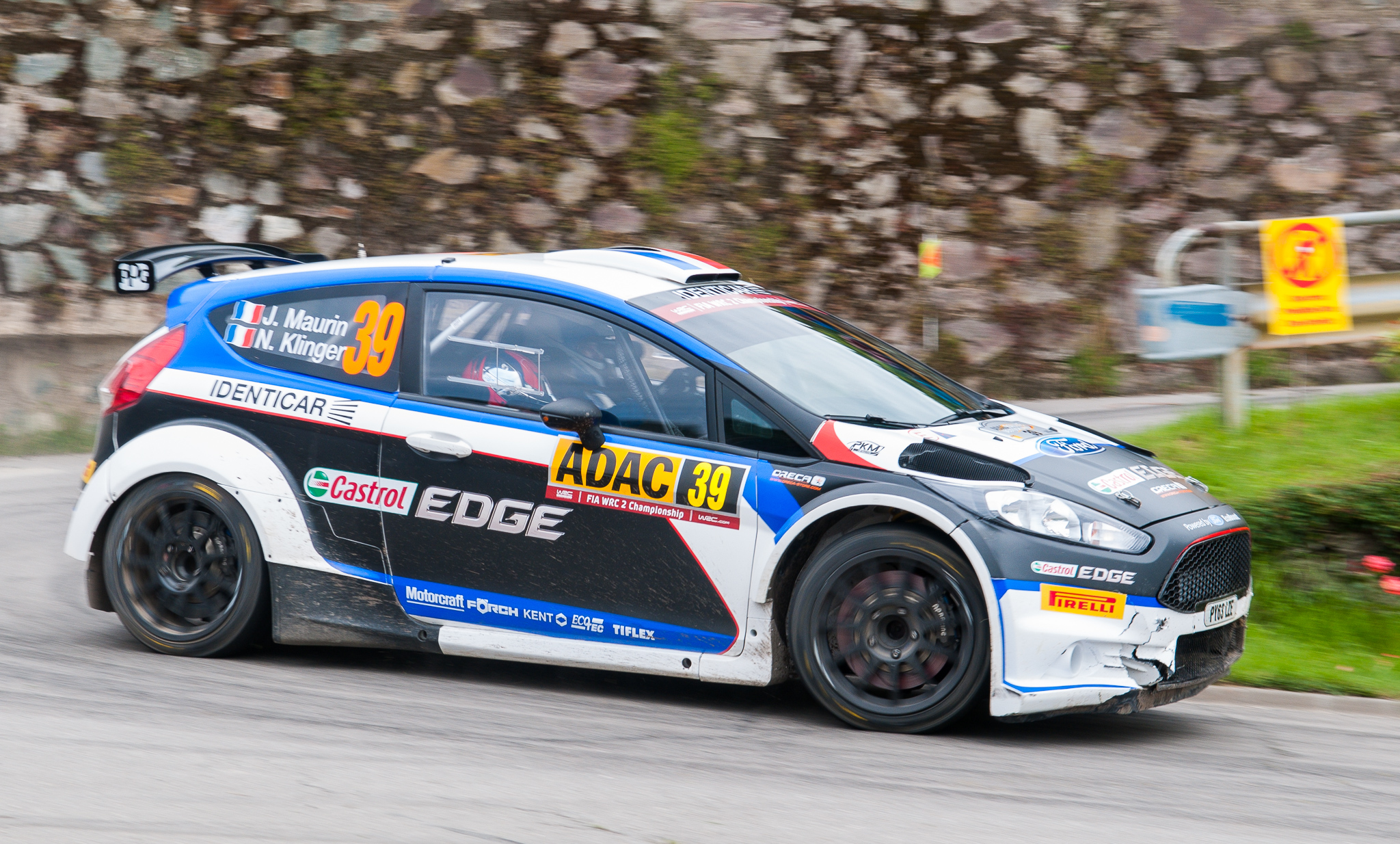
- Rally Germany 2014

Personal information
- Nationality: (France) French

World Rally Championship record
- Years active: 2010–2016
- Rallies: 27
- Championships: 0
- Rally wins: 0
- Podiums: 0
- Stage wins: 0
- Total points: 0
- First rally: 2010 Rally de Portugal
- Last rally: 2016 Rally Catalunya

Julien Maurin (born 2 March 1985) is a French rally driver.

== Results ==
=== IRC results ===
Year	Entrant	Car	1	2	3	4	5	6	7	8	9	10	11	12	13	WDC	Points
2009	(France) Julien Maurin	Fiat Grande Punto Abarth S2000	MON; Ret	BRA	KEN											NC	0
2009	(France) Julien Maurin	VW Polo S2000				POR; Ret	BEL	RUS								NC	0
2009	(France) Julien Maurin	Škoda Fabia S2000							POR; Ret	CZE	ESP; Ret	ITA; 16	SCO			NC	0
2010	(France) Julien Maurin	Ford Fiesta S2000	MON; Ret	BRA	ARG	CAN	ITA	BEL	AZO	MAD	CZE	ITA	SCO	CYP		NC	0
2011	(France) Julien Maurin	Ford Fiesta S2000	MON; 12	CAN	COR; 7	YAL	YPR; 11	AZO; Ret	ZLI	MEC	SAN	SCO	CYP			25th	7
2012	(France) Julien Maurin	Ford Fiesta S2000	AZO	CAN	IRL	COR; Ret	TAR	YPR	SMR	ROM	ZLI	YAL	SLI	SAN	CYP	NC	0

=== WRC Results ===
Year	Entrant	Car	1	2	3	4	5	6	7	8	9	10	11	12	13	WDC	Points
2010	Julien Maurin	Ford Fiesta S2000	SWE	MEX	JOR	TUR	NZL	POR; Ret	BUL	FIN	GER	JPN	FRA; 43	ESP	GBR	NC	0
2011	Julien Maurin	Ford Fiesta S2000	SWE	MEX	POR	JOR	ITA	ARG	GRE	FIN	GER	AUS	FRA; 27	ESP; 23	GBR	NC	0
2012	Julien Maurin	Ford Fiesta RS WRC	MON; Ret	SWE	MEX	POR	ARG	GRE	NZL	FIN	GER	GBR	FRA; 13	ITA	ESP	NC	0
2013	Julien Maurin	Ford Fiesta RS WRC	MON; Ret	SWE	MEX	POR	ARG	GRE	ITA	FIN	GER	AUS	FRA	ESP	GBR	NC	0

==== SWRC results ====
Year	Entrant	Car	1	2	3	4	5	6	7	8	9	10	SWRC	Points
2010	Julien Maurin	Ford Fiesta S2000	SWE	MEX	JOR	NZL	POR	FIN	GER	JPN	FRA; 8	GBR	16th	4
2011	Julien Maurin	Ford Fiesta S2000	MEX	JOR	ITA	GRE	FIN	GER	FRA; 6	ESP			11th	8
