= Franz Wittmann =

Franz Wittmann may refer to:

- Franz Wittmann (physicist) (1860–1932), Hungarian electrician and physicist
- Franz Wittmann, Sr. (born 1950), Austrian rally driver
- Franz Wittmann, Jr. (born 1983), Austrian rally driver, son of Franz Wittmann, Sr.

== See also ==
- Frank Wittmann (born 1970), German footballer
- Wittmann
