= 2011 Intercontinental Rally Challenge =

Seasons
- ← 2010 2012 →

The 2011 Intercontinental Rally Challenge was the sixth season of the Intercontinental Rally Challenge. The season consisted of twelve rounds and started on 19 January with the Monte Carlo Rally. The season ended on 5 November, at the Cyprus Rally.

The series introduced a new points system for the 2011 season, applying the FIA points system – 25–18–15–12–10–8–6–4–2–1 – which had been introduced to other championships within the last twelve months. Within the new system, the final two events in Scotland and Cyprus offered more points via a scoring coefficient. Scotland offered crews points on a 1.5 coefficient, meaning that the winner earned 37.5 points, second place 27 points, third place 22.5 points and so on. In Cyprus, double points were offered, meaning the winner received 50 points, second place 36, third place 30 and so forth. The rule was intended to increase the number of entries for the final two rounds, although Bouffier (who was still in mathematical contention for the title) did not participate in Cyprus.

Argentina was cancelled, meaning the calendar had a large proportion of tarmac events. Extra points for the final two gravel rallies meant that tarmac specialists would not necessarily dominate, however. The Proton Satria Neos were not as competitive as the Škoda Fabias or Peugeot 207s. The Monte Carlo Rally had several notable appearances, including François Delecour and 2003 World Rally Champion Petter Solberg. The final two rallies were won by Andreas Mikkelsen, who also took two other podiums and the most stage wins during the season en-route to the championship.

== Calendar ==
Rd.	Start date	Finish date	Rally	Rally headquarters	Surface	Stages	Distance
1	19 January	21 January	(Monaco) 79th Rallye Automobile Monte-Carlo	Valence, Drôme	Mixed	13	337.06 km
C	4 March	6 March	(Argentina) Rally de los Alerces	Los Alerces National Park, Chubut	Gravel	??	??
2	14 April	16 April	(Spain) 35th Rally Islas Canarias - El Corte Inglés	Las Palmas, Gran Canaria	Asphalt	12	190.59 km
3	12 May	14 May	(France) 54th Tour de Corse - E.Leclerc	Ajaccio, Corsica	Asphalt	14	320.84 km
4	2 June	4 June	(Ukraine) 13th Prime Yalta Rally	Yalta, Crimea	Asphalt	14	261.87 km
5	23 June	25 June	(Belgium) 47th Geko Ypres Rally	Ypres, West Flanders	Asphalt	18	287.89 km
6	14 July	16 July	(Portugal) 46th SATA Rallye Açores	Ponta Delgada, Azores	Gravel	17	205.09 km
C	4 August	6 August	(Portugal) 52nd Rali Vinho da Madeira	Funchal, Madeira	Asphalt	19	268.50 km
7	26 August	28 August	(Czech Republic) 41st Barum Rally Zlín	Zlín, Zlín Region	Asphalt	15	248.48 km
8	9 September	11 September	(Hungary) 45th Canon Mecsek Rallye	Pécs, Baranya	Asphalt	14	251.86 km
9	22 September	24 September	(Italy) 53rd Rallye Sanremo	Sanremo, Liguria	Asphalt	13	225.77 km
10	7 October	9 October	(United Kingdom) 3rd RACMSA Rally of Scotland	Perth, Scotland	Gravel	15	200.09 km
11	3 November	5 November	40th Cyprus Rally	Paphos	Mixed	11	187.58 km

The calendar had consisted of twelve events run on two continents. The schedule will include two new countries, France (Tour de Corse, former WRC event) and Hungary (Asphalt/Gravel Mecsek Rallye), plus a return to Argentina for the new gravel-based Rally de los Alerces. The final calendar was released on 10 December 2010, with the Prime Yalta Rally in Ukraine added, and the Rally Islas Canarias listed without a confirmed date. Rally Islas Canarias was reinstated to the calendar on 19 January 2011 at the expense of Rally de los Alerces, which was cancelled. Rali Vinho da Madeira was later dropped in June 2011 due to a breach in contract related to debts the event organizers had not paid.

== Selected entries ==
Peugeot UK had already confirmed their entry for the 2011 season with Guy Wilks who previously raced for Škoda UK instead of 2009 champion Kris Meeke who made the switch to World Rally Championship (WRC) driving for MINI. 2003 World Rally champion Petter Solberg made a one-off appearance at the Monte Carlo Rally for Peugeot. Škoda UK, had also announced their plan to compete in IRC in 2011. The team's single car was occupied by Andreas Mikkelsen, who competed in the Skoda Italia-run car, alongside the works cars of the top two drivers in 2010, Juho Hänninen and Jan Kopecký.

Entrant/Team	Manufacturer	Car	Driver	Co-driver	Tyres	Rounds
(Czech Republic) Škoda Motorsport	Škoda	Škoda Fabia S2000	(Finland) Juho Hänninen	(Finland) Mikko Markkula	M	1–2, 4, 6–7, 10–11
(Czech Republic) Škoda Motorsport	Škoda	Škoda Fabia S2000	(Czech Republic) Jan Kopecký	(Czech Republic) Petr Starý	M	All
(Czech Republic) Škoda Motorsport	Škoda	Škoda Fabia S2000	(France) Nicolas Vouilloz	(France) Benjamin Veillas	M	1
(Czech Republic) Škoda Motorsport	Škoda	Škoda Fabia S2000	(Belgium) Freddy Loix	(Belgium) Frédéric Miclotte	M	1
(Belgium) BFO-Škoda Rally Team	Škoda	Škoda Fabia S2000	(Belgium) Freddy Loix	(Belgium) Frédéric Miclotte	M	2–3, 5, 7–11
(United Kingdom) Škoda UK	Škoda	Škoda Fabia S2000	(Norway) Andreas Mikkelsen	(Norway) Ola Fløene	M	All
(Germany) Škoda Auto Deutschland	Škoda	Škoda Fabia S2000	(Germany) Mark Wallenwein	(Germany) Stefan Kopczyk	M	1, 7–8, 11
(Germany) Škoda Auto Deutschland	Škoda	Škoda Fabia S2000	(Germany) Matthias Kahle	(Germany) Peter Göbel	M	7–8, 10–11
(Finland) TGS Worldwide OÜ	Škoda	Škoda Fabia S2000	(Finland) Toni Gardemeister	(Finland) Tapio Suominen	H	2–5, 7–10
Škoda Sweden	Škoda	Škoda Fabia S2000	(Sweden) Patrik Sandell	(Sweden) Staffan Parmander	M	3–4
Škoda Sweden	Škoda	Škoda Fabia S2000	(Sweden) Patrik Sandell	(Sweden) Staffan Parmander	P	6–7, 10–11
(Estonia) ME3 Rally Team	Škoda	Škoda Fabia S2000	(Estonia) Karl Kruuda	(Estonia) Martin Järveoja	M	4–5, 7–11
(Belgium) Autostal Duindistel	Škoda	Škoda Fabia S2000	(Belgium) Bernd Casier	(Belgium) Francis Caesemaeker	M	5
(Netherlands) Wevers Sport	Škoda	Škoda Fabia S2000	(Netherlands) Hans Weijs	(Belgium) Bjorn Degandt	BF	5
(Netherlands) Wevers Sport	Škoda	Škoda Fabia S2000	(Netherlands) Mark van Eldik	(Belgium) Robin Buysmans	BF	5
(Netherlands) Wevers Sport	Škoda	Škoda Fabia S2000	(Netherlands) Edwin Schilt	(Netherlands) Lisette Bakker	BF	5
(United Kingdom) Simpsons Škoda	Škoda	Škoda Fabia S2000	(United Kingdom) Jonathan Greer	(United Kingdom) Dai Roberts	P	5, 10
(Republic of Ireland) Škoda Ireland	Škoda	Škoda Fabia S2000	(Republic of Ireland) Robert Barrable	(Republic of Ireland) Damien Connolly	P	5
(Republic of Ireland) Škoda Ireland	Škoda	Škoda Fabia S2000	(Republic of Ireland) Robert Barrable	(Republic of Ireland) Damien Connolly	M	7, 10
(Czech Republic) Adell Mogul Racing Team	Škoda	Škoda Fabia S2000	(Czech Republic) Roman Kresta	(Czech Republic) Petr Gross	M	7
(Hungary) Škoda Rally Team Hungaria	Škoda	Škoda Fabia S2000	(Hungary) Norbert Herczig	(Hungary) Kálmán Benics	M	8
(Austria) Red Bull Škoda	Škoda	Škoda Fabia S2000	(Germany) Hermann Gassner	(Germany) Timo Gottschalk	M	8
(Belgium) René Georges Motorsport	Škoda	Škoda Fabia S2000	(Turkey) Burcu Çetinkaya	(Turkey) Çiçek Güney	Y	10–11
Peugeot France	Peugeot	Peugeot 207 S2000	(Norway) Petter Solberg	(United Kingdom) Chris Patterson	M	1
Peugeot France	Peugeot	Peugeot 207 S2000	(France) Bryan Bouffier	(France) Xavier Panseri	M	1–10
Peugeot France	Peugeot	Peugeot 207 S2000	(France) Stéphane Sarrazin	(France) Jacques-Julien Renucci	M	1
Peugeot France	Peugeot	Peugeot 207 S2000	(Hungary) Robert Bútor	(Slovakia) Igor Bacigál	M	8
(France) Enjolras Sport	Peugeot	Peugeot 207 S2000	(France) François Delecour	(France) Dominique Savignoni	M	1, 3
(United Kingdom) Peugeot UK	Peugeot	Peugeot 207 S2000	(United Kingdom) Guy Wilks	(United Kingdom) Phil Pugh	M	1–10
(Italy) Astra Racing	Peugeot	Peugeot 207 S2000	(Finland) Toni Gardemeister	(Finland) Tomi Tuominen	M	1
Peugeot Sport Portugal	Peugeot	Peugeot 207 S2000	(Portugal) Bruno Magalhães	(Portugal) Paulo Grave	M	1–3, 5–6, 8–9
(Italy) Friulmotor	Peugeot	Peugeot 207 S2000	(Italy) Giandomenico Basso	(Italy) Mitia Dotta	M	1
(Belgium) Peugeot Team Belux	Peugeot	Peugeot 207 S2000	(Belgium) Thierry Neuville	(France) Nicolas Klinger	M	1
(Belgium) Peugeot Team Belux	Peugeot	Peugeot 207 S2000	(Belgium) Thierry Neuville	(Belgium) Nicolas Gilsoul	M	2–5, 7–11
(Belgium) Peugeot Team Belux	Peugeot	Peugeot 207 S2000	(Belgium) Pieter Tsjoen	(Belgium) Lara Vanneste	M	5
(Italy) Kimera Motorsport	Peugeot	Peugeot 207 S2000	(Italy) Luca Betti	(Italy) Alessandro Mattioda	M	1
(Italy) Kimera Motorsport	Peugeot	Peugeot 207 S2000	(Italy) Luca Betti	(Italy) Maurizio Barone	M	5, 7
(Italy) Munaretto Sport	Peugeot	Peugeot 207 S2000	(Italy) Max Settembrini	(Italy) Corrado Bonato	M	1–3
(Italy) Munaretto Sport	Peugeot	Peugeot 207 S2000	(Italy) Max Settembrini	(Italy) David Boselli	M	9
(Italy) Munaretto Sport	Peugeot	Peugeot 207 S2000	(Italy) Marco Tempestini	(Romania) Dorin Pulpea	M	1, 4, 8
(Italy) Munaretto Sport	Peugeot	Peugeot 207 S2000	(France) Pierre Campana	(France) Sabrina De Castelli	M	3, 5, 9
(Italy) Munaretto Sport	Peugeot	Peugeot 207 S2000	(Cyprus) Doros Loucaides	(Cyprus) Costas Laos	M	11
(Spain) AMP Classic Team	Peugeot	Peugeot 207 S2000	(Spain) Jonathan Pérez	(Spain) Enrique Velasco	M	2
(Saudi Arabia) Yazeed Al Rajhi Team	Peugeot	Peugeot 207 S2000	(Saudi Arabia) Yazeed Al Rajhi	(France) Mathieu Baumel	M	3
(Czech Republic) Peugeot Delimax Czech National Team	Peugeot	Peugeot 207 S2000	(Czech Republic) Pavel Valoušek	(Czech Republic) Zdeněk Hrůza	M	7
(Hungary) Peugeot Total Hungária Rallye Team	Peugeot	Peugeot 207 S2000	(Hungary) János Tóth	(Hungary) Róbert Tagai	M	8
(Italy) National Proklama	Peugeot	Peugeot 207 S2000	(Italy) Alessandro Perico	(Italy) Fabrizio Carrara	P	9
(Norway) Petter Solberg World Rally Team	M-Sport	Ford Fiesta S2000	(Norway) Henning Solberg	(Austria) Ilka Minor	M	1
(France) Team Emap Yacco	M-Sport	Ford Fiesta S2000	(France) Julien Maurin	(France) Olivier Ural	M	1, 3, 5–6
(Ukraine) AT Rally Team	M-Sport	Ford Fiesta S2000	(Ukraine) Oleksiy Tamrazov	(Ukraine) Ivan German	M	3–4, 7
(Poland) Cersanit Rally Team	M-Sport	Ford Fiesta S2000	(Poland) Michał Sołowow	(Poland) Maciek Baran	P	5, 7
(Republic of Ireland) Keltech Motorsport	M-Sport	Ford Fiesta S2000	(Republic of Ireland) Craig Breen	(United Kingdom) Gareth Roberts	P	7, 10
(Hungary) Synergon Turán Motorsport	M-Sport	Ford Fiesta S2000	(Hungary) Frigyes Turán	(Hungary) Gábor Zsiros	M	8
(Italy) Car Racing	M-Sport	Ford Fiesta S2000	(Italy) Umberto Scandola	(Italy) Guido D'Amore	M	9
(United Kingdom) M-Sport	M-Sport	Ford Fiesta S2000	(United Kingdom) Alastair Fisher	(United Kingdom) Daniel Barritt	P	10
(Qatar) Barwa World Rally Team	M-Sport	Ford Fiesta S2000	(Qatar) Nasser Al-Attiyah	(Italy) Giovanni Bernacchini	P	11
(Malaysia) Proton Motorsport	Proton	Proton Satria Neo S2000	(Sweden) Per-Gunnar Andersson	(Sweden) Emil Axelsson	M	1–2, 4–5, 7–8, 10
(Malaysia) Proton Motorsport	Proton	Proton Satria Neo S2000	(Australia) Chris Atkinson	(Belgium) Stéphane Prévot	M	1, 9
(Malaysia) Proton Motorsport	Proton	Proton Satria Neo S2000	(Italy) Giandomenico Basso	(Italy) Mitia Dotta	M	2, 4–5, 7–9
(Malaysia) Proton Motorsport	Proton	Proton Satria Neo S2000	(Ukraine) Oleksandr Saliuk	(Ukraine) Evgen Chervonenko	M	4
(Malaysia) Proton Motorsport	Proton	Proton Satria Neo S2000	(United Kingdom) Alister McRae	(Australia) Bill Hayes	M	10
(Poland) Dytko Sport	Ralliart	Mitsubishi Lancer Evo X	(Austria) Andreas Aigner	(Austria) Daniela Ertl	M	1
(Portugal) Amarante Rally Team	Ralliart	Mitsubishi Lancer Evo X	(Portugal) Vítor Pascoal	(Portugal) Luis Ramalho	M	6
(Portugal) Team Além Mar	Ralliart	Mitsubishi Lancer Evo IX	(Portugal) Ricardo Moura	(Portugal) Sancho Eiró	M	6
(United Kingdom) David Bogie Rallying	Ralliart	Mitsubishi Lancer Evo IX	(United Kingdom) David Bogie	(United Kingdom) Kevin Rae	P	10
(Finland) Sonax Racing	Ralliart	Mitsubishi Lancer Evo IX	(Finland) Jarkko Nikara	(Finland) Petri Nikara	Y	10
(Cyprus) Nicos Thomas Racing	Ralliart	Mitsubishi Lancer Evo IX	(Cyprus) Nicos Thomas	(Cyprus) Angelos Loizides	M	11
(Netherlands) Heuvel Motorsport	Ralliart	Mitsubishi Lancer Evo X R4	(Netherlands) Jasper van den Heuvel	(Netherlands) Martine Kolman	P	5
(Czech Republic) EuroOil Čepro Czech National Team	Ralliart	Mitsubishi Lancer Evo IX R4	(Czech Republic) Václav Pech	(Czech Republic) Petr Uhel	M	7
(Hungary) Martevo Kft.	Ralliart	Mitsubishi Lancer Evo IX R4	(Hungary) György Aschenbrenner	(Hungary) Zsuzsa Pikó	Y	8
(Japan) Team Arai	Subaru	Subaru Impreza R4	(Japan) Toshihiro Arai	(Australia) Dale Moscatt	Y	3, 6, 8, 10–11
(Japan) Advan Team Nutahara	Subaru	Subaru Impreza R4	(Japan) Fumio Nutahara	(Japan) Hakaru Ichino	Y	6–7, 10
Eurosol Racing Team Hungary	Volkswagen	Volkswagen Polo S2000	(Hungary) László Vizin	(Hungary) Gábor Zsiros	M	4, 7
(Italy) National Proklama	Abarth	Abarth Grande Punto S2000	(Italy) Luca Rossetti	(Italy) Matteo Chiarcossi	M	5

== Results ==
Round	Rally name	Podium finishers			
Round	Rally name	Rank	Driver	Car	Time
1	(Monaco) / (France) Monte Carlo Rally (19–22 January) — Results and report	1	(France) Bryan Bouffier	Peugeot 207 S2000	3:32:55.6
1	(Monaco) / (France) Monte Carlo Rally (19–22 January) — Results and report	2	(Belgium) Freddy Loix	Škoda Fabia S2000	3:33:28.1
1	(Monaco) / (France) Monte Carlo Rally (19–22 January) — Results and report	3	(United Kingdom) Guy Wilks	Peugeot 207 S2000	3:34:15.3
2	(Spain) Rally Islas Canarias (14–16 April) — Results and report	1	(Finland) Juho Hänninen	Škoda Fabia S2000	1:40:38.1
2	(Spain) Rally Islas Canarias (14–16 April) — Results and report	2	(Czech Republic) Jan Kopecký	Škoda Fabia S2000	1:40:39.6
2	(Spain) Rally Islas Canarias (14–16 April) — Results and report	3	(Belgium) Thierry Neuville	Peugeot 207 S2000	1:40:46.3
3	(France) Tour de Corse (12–14 May) — Results and report	1	(Belgium) Thierry Neuville	Peugeot 207 S2000	3:20:51.0
3	(France) Tour de Corse (12–14 May) — Results and report	2	(Czech Republic) Jan Kopecký	Škoda Fabia S2000	3:21:06.5
3	(France) Tour de Corse (12–14 May) — Results and report	3	(Belgium) Freddy Loix	Škoda Fabia S2000	3:21:53.6
4	(Ukraine) Prime Yalta Rally (2–4 June) — Results and report	1	(Finland) Juho Hänninen	Škoda Fabia S2000	2:54:14.0
4	(Ukraine) Prime Yalta Rally (2–4 June) — Results and report	2	(France) Bryan Bouffier	Peugeot 207 S2000	2:54:25.7
4	(Ukraine) Prime Yalta Rally (2–4 June) — Results and report	3	(Czech Republic) Jan Kopecký	Škoda Fabia S2000	2:54:52.7
5	(Belgium) Ypres Rally (23–25 June) — Results and report	1	(Belgium) Freddy Loix	Škoda Fabia S2000	2:40:03.9
5	(Belgium) Ypres Rally (23–25 June) — Results and report	2	(Netherlands) Hans Weijs	Škoda Fabia S2000	2:44:00.8
5	(Belgium) Ypres Rally (23–25 June) — Results and report	3	(Poland) Michał Sołowow	Ford Fiesta S2000	2:46:10.7
6	(Portugal) Rallye Açores (14–16 July) — Results and report	1	(Finland) Juho Hänninen	Škoda Fabia S2000	2:19:03.8
6	(Portugal) Rallye Açores (14–16 July) — Results and report	2	(Norway) Andreas Mikkelsen	Škoda Fabia S2000	2:19:46.1
6	(Portugal) Rallye Açores (14–16 July) — Results and report	3	(Czech Republic) Jan Kopecký	Škoda Fabia S2000	2:20:49.8
7	(Czech Republic) Barum Rally Zlín (26–28 August) — Results and report	1	(Czech Republic) Jan Kopecký	Škoda Fabia S2000	2:15:51.7
7	(Czech Republic) Barum Rally Zlín (26–28 August) — Results and report	2	(Belgium) Freddy Loix	Škoda Fabia S2000	2:15:52.9
7	(Czech Republic) Barum Rally Zlín (26–28 August) — Results and report	3	(Finland) Juho Hänninen	Škoda Fabia S2000	2:16:29.1
8	(Hungary) Mecsek Rallye (9–11 September) — Results and report	1	(Czech Republic) Jan Kopecký	Škoda Fabia S2000	2:00:06.7
8	(Hungary) Mecsek Rallye (9–11 September) — Results and report	2	(Belgium) Thierry Neuville	Peugeot 207 S2000	2:00:07.5
8	(Hungary) Mecsek Rallye (9–11 September) — Results and report	3	(Belgium) Freddy Loix	Škoda Fabia S2000	2:01:06.7
9	(Italy) Rallye Sanremo (22–24 September) — Results and report	1	(Belgium) Thierry Neuville	Peugeot 207 S2000	2:19:57.8
9	(Italy) Rallye Sanremo (22–24 September) — Results and report	2	(Norway) Andreas Mikkelsen	Škoda Fabia S2000	2:19:59.3
9	(Italy) Rallye Sanremo (22–24 September) — Results and report	3	(France) Bryan Bouffier	Peugeot 207 S2000	2:20:13.8
10	(United Kingdom) Rally Scotland (7–9 October) — Results and report	1	(Norway) Andreas Mikkelsen	Škoda Fabia S2000	1:55:17.2
10	(United Kingdom) Rally Scotland (7–9 October) — Results and report	2	(Finland) Juho Hänninen	Škoda Fabia S2000	1:55:43.6
10	(United Kingdom) Rally Scotland (7–9 October) — Results and report	3	(France) Bryan Bouffier	Peugeot 207 S2000	1:56:52.5
11	Cyprus Rally (3–5 November) — Results and report	1	(Norway) Andreas Mikkelsen	Škoda Fabia S2000	2:25:18.5
11	Cyprus Rally (3–5 November) — Results and report	2	(Czech Republic) Jan Kopecký	Škoda Fabia S2000	2:26:59.0
11	Cyprus Rally (3–5 November) — Results and report	3	(Sweden) Patrik Sandell	Škoda Fabia S2000	2:28:13.3

== Standings ==
=== Drivers ===
- Only the best seven scores from each driver count towards the championship.

Pos	Driver	MON (Monaco)	CAN (Spain)	COR (France)	YAL (Ukraine)	YPR (Belgium)	AZO (Portugal)	ZLI (Czech Republic)	MEC (Hungary)	SAN (Italy)	SCO (United Kingdom)	CYP (Cyprus)	Total	Drop	Pts
1	(Norway) Andreas Mikkelsen	Ret	6	6	4	Ret	2	5	Ret	2	1	1	161.5	8	153.5
2	(Czech Republic) Jan Kopecký	8	2	2	3	DNS	3	1	1	4	5	2	183	31	152
3	(Finland) Juho Hänninen	6	1		1		1	3			2	16	125		125
4	(Belgium) Freddy Loix	2	4	3		1		2	3	Ret		5	123		123
5	(Belgium) Thierry Neuville	Ret	3	1	6	Ret		4	2	1	6	Ret	115		115
6	(France) Bryan Bouffier	1	8	Ret	2	DSQ	4	Ret	4	3	3		110.5		110.5
7	(United Kingdom) Guy Wilks	3	5	Ret	5	5	Ret	Ret	Ret	Ret	Ret		47		47
8	(Sweden) Patrik Sandell			9	9		5	12			Ret	3	44		44
9	(Finland) Toni Gardemeister	10	12	8	7	7		6	7	9	7		45	2	43
10	(Estonia) Karl Kruuda				8	5		10	11	Ret	13	4	39		39
11	(Portugal) Bruno Magalhães	Ret	9	5		Ret	Ret		9	5			26		26
12	(Republic of Ireland) Craig Breen							7			4		24		24
13	(Netherlands) Hans Weijs					2							18		18
14	(Germany) Matthias Kahle							19	19		10	6	17.5		17.5
15	(France) Pierre Campana	14		4						8			16		16
16	(Poland) Michał Sołowow					3		11					15		15
17	(Japan) Toshi Arai			13			Ret		18		9	7	15		15
18	(France) Stéphane Sarrazin	4											12		12
19	(France) François Delecour	5											10		10
19	(Germany) Hermann Gassner								5				10		10
21	(Portugal) Ricardo Moura						6						8		8
21	(Hungary) György Aschenbrenner								6				8		8
21	(Italy) Alessandro Perico									6			8		8
24	(Germany) Mark Wallenwein	21						18	14			8	8		8
25	(France) Julien Maurin	12		7		11	Ret						7		7
26	(France) Nicolas Vouilloz	7											6		6
26	(Portugal) Vítor Lopes						7						6		6
26	(Italy) Umberto Scandola									7			6		6
29	(Italy) Luca Rossetti					8							6		6
29	(United Kingdom) Alastair Fisher										8		6		6
31	(Italy) Giandomenico Basso	9	11		Ret	Ret		13	Ret	10			5		5
32	(Portugal) Vítor Pascoal						8						4		4
32	(Czech Republic) Roman Kresta							8					4		4
32	(Hungary) Róbert Bútor								8				4		4
35	(Netherlands) Bernhard ten Brinke					9							4		4
36	(Cyprus) Doros Loucaides											10	4		4
37	(Sweden) Per-Gunnar Andersson	Ret	24		Ret	19		9	Ret		Ret		2		2
38	(Portugal) Sérgio Silva						9						2		2
39	(Republic of Ireland) Robert Barrable					10		DSQ			16		2		2
40	(Cyprus) Charalambos Timotheou											11	2		2
41	(France) Jean-Mathieu Leandri			10									1		1
41	(Austria) Beppo Harrach								10				1		1
43	(Japan) Fumio Nutahara						11	Ret			15		1		1
44	(Hungary) János Puskádi			23	12			Ret	28		20	24	1		1
Pos	Driver	MON (Monaco)	CAN (Spain)	COR (France)	YAL (Ukraine)	YPR (Belgium)	AZO (Portugal)	ZLI (Czech Republic)	MEC (Hungary)	SAN (Italy)	SCO (United Kingdom)	CYP (Cyprus)	Total	Drop	Pts

Key
Colour	Result
Gold	Winner
Silver	2nd place
Bronze	3rd place
Green	Points finish
Blue	Non-points finish
Blue	Non-classified finish (NC)
Purple	Did not finish (Ret)
Black	Excluded (EX)
Black	Disqualified (DSQ)
White	Did not start (DNS)
White	Cancelled (C)
Blank	Withdrew entry from the event (WD)

=== Manufacturers ===
- Only the best seven scores from each manufacturer count towards the championship.

Pos	Manufacturer	MON (Monaco)	CAN (Spain)	COR (France)	YAL (Ukraine)	YPR (Belgium)	AZO (Portugal)	ZLI (Czech Republic)	MEC (Hungary)	SAN (Italy)	SCO (United Kingdom)	CYP (Cyprus)	Total	Drop	Pts
1	(Czech Republic) Škoda	30	43	33	40	43	43	43	40	30	64.5	86	495.5	133	362.5
2	(France) Peugeot	40	27	37	30	16	19	15	30	40	37.5	24	315.5	74	241.5
3	(Japan) Subaru	14	4	14	1	0	16	2	10	6	15	42	124	7	117
4	(United Kingdom) M-Sport	10	3	10	4	23	0	20	0	10	30	0	110	3	107
5	(Japan) Ralliart	6	0	0	10	8	20	5	18	6	1.5	36	110.5	6.5	104
6	(Japan) Honda	0	8	4	16	0	0	0	3	0	3	12	46		46
7	(Malaysia) Proton	0	16	0	0	1	0	16	0	8	0	0	41		41
8	(Italy) Abarth	1	0	3	0	10	0	0	0	1	0	0	15		15
Pos	Manufacturer	MON (Monaco)	CAN (Spain)	COR (France)	YAL (Ukraine)	YPR (Belgium)	AZO (Portugal)	ZLI (Czech Republic)	MEC (Hungary)	SAN (Italy)	SCO (United Kingdom)	CYP (Cyprus)	Total	Drop	Pts

=== 2WD Cup drivers' standings ===
- Only the best seven scores from each driver count towards the championship.

Pos	Driver	MON (Monaco)	CAN (Spain)	COR (France)	YAL (Ukraine)	YPR (Belgium)	AZO (Portugal)	ZLI (Czech Republic)	MEC (Hungary)	SAN (Italy)	SCO (United Kingdom)	CYP (Cyprus)	Pts
1	(France) Jean-Michel Raoux	7		Ret	1		2	3	7	14	Ret	1	120
2	(Italy) Stefano Albertini			3		Ret		1	1	2		2	119
3	(Hungary) János Puskádi			9	3			Ret	6		3	4	71.5
4	(Estonia) Martin Kangur			Ret	6	11		6	Ret	Ret	1		53.5
5	(France) Pierre-Antoine Guglielmi			1						3			40
6	(Cyprus) Andreas Charalambous											3	30
7	(United Kingdom) John MacCrone										2		27
8	(Belgium) Kris Princen	Ret				1							25
9	(France) Pierre Campana	1											25
9	(Spain) Joan Vinyes		1										25
9	(Portugal) Paulo Maciel						1						25
9	(Italy) Davide Medici									1			25
13	(France) Eric Mauffrey	4				Ret		5	Ret				22
14	(Cyprus) Doros Constantinou											5	20
15	(Romania) Vlad Cosma				2			18					18
16	(Switzerland) Michaël Burri	2											18
16	(Spain) Gorka Antxustegi		2										18
16	(France) Guy Fiori			2									18
16	(Republic of Ireland) Tommy Doyle					2							18
16	(Czech Republic) Václav Dunovský							2					18
16	(Hungary) Menyhért Krózser								2				18
22	(United Kingdom) Ruary MacLeod										4		18
23	(United Kingdom) Harry Hunt	20	6	6		Ret	Ret			9	Ret	Ret	18
24	(France) Renaud Poutout	3											15
24	(Spain) Angel Marrero		3										15
24	(Belgium) Kevin Demaerschalk					3							15
24	(Portugal) Carlos Costa						3						15
24	(Hungary) Sasa Ollé								3				15
29	(United Kingdom) Tony Jardine	Ret									5		15
30	(Spain) Raul Quesada		4										12
30	(France) Jean-Paul Villa			4									12
30	(Georgia (country)) Archil Bidzinashvili				4								12
30	(Netherlands) Kevin Abbring					4							12
30	(Portugal) Tiago Mota						4						12
30	(Czech Republic) Petr Zedník							4					12
30	(Hungary) Zsolt Szíjj								4				12
30	(Italy) Roberto Vescovi									4			12
38	(Bulgaria) Ekaterina Stratieva				5				Ret				10
39	(France) Adrien Tambay	5											10
39	(Spain) Enrique Cruz		5										10
39	(France) Pierre Quilici			5									10
39	(Belgium) Xavier Baugnet					5							10
39	(Portugal) Olavo Esteves						5						10
39	(Hungary) Szabolcs Várkonyi								5				10
39	(Belgium) Cedric Cherain									5			10
46	(Italy) Andrea Crugnola	6											8
46	(Belgium) Claudie Tanghe					6							8
46	(Portugal) Joaquim Pacheco						6						8
46	(Italy) Andrea Cortinovis									6			8
50	(Czech Republic) Petr Brynda			7		10		Ret	Ret				7
51	(Spain) Enrique García Ojeda		7										6
51	(Lithuania) Giedrius Kriptavičius				7								6
51	(Belgium) Nicolas Damsin					7							6
51	(Portugal) João Faria						7						6
51	(Hungary) Zsolt Pénzes							7					6
51	(Italy) Alex Vittalini									7			6
57	(Belgium) Renaud Bronkart								8	27			4
58	(Greece) Dimitrios Amaxopoulos	8											4
58	(Italy) Alessandro Barchiesi		8										4
58	(France) Stéphane Rovina			8									4
58	(Ukraine) Vadim Trutnyev				8								4
58	(Belgium) Davy Vanneste					8							4
58	(Czech Republic) Lubomír Minařík							8					4
58	(Italy) Matteo Brunello									8			4
65	(France) Lilian Vialle	9											2
65	(Spain) Miguel Arias		9										2
65	(Belgium) Vincent Verschueren					9							2
65	(Poland) Jarosław Kołtun							9					2
69	(France) Christophe Fontaine	10											1
69	(Spain) Rubén Gracia		10										1
69	(France) Franck Amaudru			10									1
69	(Czech Republic) Milan Kneifel							10					1
69	(Italy) Elwis Chentre									10			1
Pos	Driver	MON (Monaco)	CAN (Spain)	COR (France)	YAL (Ukraine)	YPR (Belgium)	AZO (Portugal)	ZLI (Czech Republic)	MEC (Hungary)	SAN (Italy)	SCO (United Kingdom)	CYP (Cyprus)	Pts

=== 2WD Cup manufacturers' standings ===
- Only the best seven scores from each manufacturer count towards the championship.

Pos	Manufacturer	MON (Monaco)	CAN (Spain)	COR (France)	YAL (Ukraine)	YPR (Belgium)	AZO (Portugal)	ZLI (Czech Republic)	MEC (Hungary)	SAN (Italy)	SCO (United Kingdom)	CYP (Cyprus)	Total	Drop	Pts
1	(Japan) Honda	12	37	18	43	15	0	33	43	0	60	86	347	27	320
2	(United Kingdom) M-Sport	0	33	0	15	43	0	25	0	0	45	0	161		161
3	(France) Peugeot	35	18	37	12	10	25	12	0	0	0	0	149		149
4	(Italy) Abarth	33	0	25	0	0	0	0	0	27	0	0	85		85
5	(Czech Republic) Škoda	0	0	0	0	12	0	18	0	43	0	0	73		73
Pos	Manufacturer	MON (Monaco)	CAN (Spain)	COR (France)	YAL (Ukraine)	YPR (Belgium)	AZO (Portugal)	ZLI (Czech Republic)	MEC (Hungary)	SAN (Italy)	SCO (United Kingdom)	CYP (Cyprus)	Total	Drop	Pts

=== Production Cup drivers' standings ===
- Only the best seven scores from each driver count towards the championship.

Pos	Driver	MON (Monaco)	CAN (Spain)	COR (France)	YAL (Ukraine)	YPR (Belgium)	AZO (Portugal)	ZLI (Czech Republic)	MEC (Hungary)	SAN (Italy)	SCO (United Kingdom)	CYP (Cyprus)	Pts
1	(Japan) Toshi Arai			2			Ret		7		1	1	111.5
2	(Switzerland) Florian Gonon	1		1		Ret				1			75
3	(Italy) Marco Caviglioli							15	10	2	4	Ret	37
4	(Cyprus) Charalambos Timotheou											2	36
5	(Japan) Fumio Nutahara						5	Ret			3		32.5
6	(Cyprus) Savvas Savva											3	30
7	(Ukraine) Volodymyr Pechenyk				1							10	27
8	(United Kingdom) Jason Pritchard										2		27
9	(Spain) Jose Barrios		1										25
9	(Belgium) Jonas Langenakens					1							25
9	(Portugal) Ricardo Moura						1						25
9	(Czech Republic) Jaroslav Orsák							1					25
9	(Hungary) György Aschenbrenner								1				25
14	(Czech Republic) Vojtěch Štajf	2						7					24
15	(Cyprus) Constantinos Tingirides											4	24
16	(Republic of Ireland) Eamonn Boland	6		Ret						3			23
17	(Cyprus) Panayiotis Yiangou											5	20
18	(Ukraine) Yuriy Shapovalov				2								18
18	(Belgium) Anthony Martin					2							18
18	(Portugal) Vítor Lopes						2						18
18	(Czech Republic) Daniel Běhálek							2					18
18	(Austria) Beppo Harrach								2				18
23	(Cyprus) Michalis Posedias											6	16
24	(Italy) Giacomo Ogliari	3											15
24	(Ukraine) Anton Kuzmenko				3								15
24	(Netherlands) Jasper van den Heuvel					3							15
24	(Portugal) Vítor Pascoal						3						15
24	(Czech Republic) Martin Bujáček							3					15
24	(Hungary) Dávid Botka								3				15
30	(Kazakhstan) Arman Smailov										5		15
31	(Italy) Maurizio Verini	4											12
31	(Belarus) Yukhym Vazheyevskyy				4								12
31	(Belgium) Andy Lefevere					4							12
31	(Portugal) Sérgio Silva						4						12
31	(Czech Republic) Václav Arazim							4					12
31	(Hungary) László Ranga								4				12
31	(Italy) Corrado Perino									4			12
38	(Hungary) Mihály Matics						8		6				12
39	(Cyprus) Costas Zenonos											7	12
40	(France) Claude Carret	5											10
40	(Ukraine) Yevgen Konopellkin				5								10
40	(Belgium) Philip Barbier					5							10
40	(Czech Republic) Jaromír Tarabus							5					10
40	(Hungary) István Pethő								5				10
45	(Georgia (country)) Alexander Lomadze				6								8
45	(Belgium) Kris Cools					6							8
45	(Portugal) José Paula						6						8
45	(Czech Republic) Milan Pantálek							6					8
49	(Cyprus) Phivos Nicolaou											8	8
50	(France) Herve Knapick	7											6
50	(United Kingdom) Neil McCance					7							6
52	(Hungary) László Vizin								9			9	6
53	(France) Miguel Baudoin	8											4
53	(Belgium) Bruno Parmentier					8							4
53	(Hungary) András Hadik								8				4
56	(France) Rémi Tosello	9											2
56	(Netherlands) Michael Eckhaus					9							2
56	(Czech Republic) Richard Kirnig							9					2
59	(France) Pierre Bos	10											1
59	(Netherlands) Roy Clijnk					10							1
59	(Czech Republic) Petr Trnovec							10					1
Pos	Driver	MON (Monaco)	CAN (Spain)	COR (France)	YAL (Ukraine)	YPR (Belgium)	AZO (Portugal)	ZLI (Czech Republic)	MEC (Hungary)	SAN (Italy)	SCO (United Kingdom)	CYP (Cyprus)	Pts
