= 2009 Rally Scotland =

Round 11 of the 2009 Intercontinental Rally Challenge season
← Previous event
- Rally Scotland Logo
- Host country: United Kingdom
- Rally base: Perth and Stirling
- Dates run: November 19 – 21 2010
- Stages: 13 (204.50 km; 127.07 miles)
- Stage surface: Gravel

Statistics
- Crews: 34 at start, 20 at finish

Overall results
- Overall winner: Guy Wilks; Phillip Pugh

The 2009 Rally Scotland was the 11th and final round of the 2009 Intercontinental Rally Challenge, and the first edition of the Rally Scotland/ The event was held between 19–21 November during some of the wettest weather seen in the UK. The rally was officially started at the historic site of Scone Palace on Thursday 19th and concluded with a ceremonial finish at Stirling Castle on Saturday 21st. The first ten cars were flagged away at the start by the First Minister of Scotland Alex Salmond and Jackie Stewart.

The weather and the battle between Kris Meeke and Guy Wilks dominated the weekend with Meeke winning the rally on the road. However, due to a technical infringement involving the front subframe of Meeke's car, Meeke was excluded giving the rally win to Wilks. This was the first IRC win for Guy Wilks.

== Results ==
Pos.	Driver	Co-driver	Car	Time	Difference	Points
1.	(United Kingdom) Guy Wilks	(United Kingdom) Phillip Pugh	Škoda Fabia S2000	2:17:07.5	0.0	10
2.	(United Kingdom) Alister McRae	(Australia) Billy Hayes	Proton Satria Neo	2:19:54.8	2:47.3	8
3.	(United Kingdom) Jonathan Greer	(United Kingdom) Dai Roberts	Mitsubishi Lancer Evolution IX	2:22:29.3	5:21.8	6
4.	(United Kingdom) Jock Armstrong	(United Kingdom) Kirsty Riddick	Subaru Impreza	2:23:48.4	6:40.9	5
5.	(Estonia) Kaspar Koitla	(Estonia) Andres Ots	Honda Civic Type R	2:30:58.6	13:51.1	4
6.	(Republic of Ireland) Eamonn Boland	(Republic of Ireland) Mick Morrissey	Mitsubishi Lancer Evolution IX	2:31:56.3	14:48.8	3
7.	(France) Sebastien Rousseaux	(France) Serge Legars	Subaru Impreza	2:34:06.8	16:59.3	2
8.	(United Kingdom) Tom Cave	(United Kingdom) Craig Parry	Ford Fiesta	2:34:15.2	17:07.7	1

== Special stages ==
Day	Stage	Time	Name	Length	Winner	Time	Avg. spd.	Rally leader
1 (19 Nov)	SS1	20:11	Scone Palace 1	1.53 km	(United Kingdom) Kris Meeke	1:09.6	79.14 km/h	(United Kingdom) Kris Meeke
1 (19 Nov)	SS2	20:26	Scone Palace 2	1.53 km	(United Kingdom) Kris Meeke	1:08.8	80.06 km/h	(United Kingdom) Kris Meeke
2 (20 Nov)	SS3	08:50	Craigvinean 1	17.34 km	(United Kingdom) Kris Meeke	11:09.4	93.25 km/h	(United Kingdom) Kris Meeke
2 (20 Nov)	SS4	10:03	Blackcraig	11.50 km	(United Kingdom) Guy Wilks	6:47.4	101.62 km/h	(United Kingdom) Kris Meeke
2 (20 Nov)	SS5	12:12	Errochy	21.56 km	(United Kingdom) Kris Meeke	13:09.4	98.32 km/h	(United Kingdom) Kris Meeke
2 (20 Nov)	SS6	13:23	Drummond Hill	18.66 km	(United Kingdom) Guy Wilks	11:41.2	95.80 km/h	(United Kingdom) Kris Meeke
2 (20 Nov)	SS7	16:05	Craigvinean 2	17.34 km	(United Kingdom) Kris Meeke	11:21.0	91.67 km/h	(United Kingdom) Kris Meeke
3 (21 Nov)	SS8	08:00	Achray 1	16.41 km	(United Kingdom) Guy Wilks	10:59.2	89.62 km/h	(United Kingdom) Kris Meeke
3 (21 Nov)	SS9	08:34	Fairy Knowe 1	7.59 km	(United Kingdom) Kris Meeke	5:14.4	86.91 km/h	(United Kingdom) Kris Meeke
3 (21 Nov)	SS10	09:10	Loch Ard 1	33.52 km	(United Kingdom) Kris Meeke	22:02.9	91.22 km/h	(United Kingdom) Kris Meeke
3 (21 Nov)	SS11	12:56	Achray 2	16.41 km	(United Kingdom) Guy Wilks	11:13.2	87.75 km/h	(United Kingdom) Kris Meeke
3 (21 Nov)	SS12	13:30	Fairy Knowe 2	7.59 km	(United Kingdom) Guy Wilks	5:18.6	85.76 km/h	(United Kingdom) Kris Meeke
3 (21 Nov)	SS13	14:06	Loch Ard 2	33.52 km	(United Kingdom) Jock Armstrong	23:53.2	84.20 km/h	(United Kingdom) Kris Meeke
