= 2009 Intercontinental Rally Challenge =

Seasons
- ← 2008 2010 →

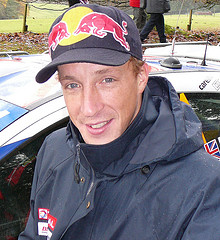
Kris Meeke won four of the nine rallies he contested allowing him to win the title by eleven points.

The 2009 Intercontinental Rally Challenge was the fourth season of the Intercontinental Rally Challenge. The season consists of twelve rounds and began on January 21, with the 77° Rallye Automobile Monte-Carlo. The season ended on November 21, at the inaugural RAC Rally of Scotland. With four wins, Kris Meeke won the championship ahead of Jan Kopecký and Freddy Loix.

== Calendar ==
Rd.	Start date	Finish date	Rally	Rally headquarters	Surface	Stages	Distance
1	21 January	24 January	(Monaco) 77th Rallye Automobile Monte-Carlo	Valence, Drôme	Mixed	14	362.25 km
2	5 March	7 March	(Brazil) 29th Rally Internacional de Curitiba	Curitiba, Paraná	Gravel	13	220.38 km
3	3 April	4 April	(Kenya) 57th KCB Safari Rally	Nairobi	Gravel	14	296.39 km
4	7 May	9 May	(Portugal) 44th SATA Rallye Açores	Ponta Delgada, Azores	Gravel	18	229.86 km
5	18 June	20 June	45th Belgium Ypres Westhoek Rally	Ypres, West Flanders	Asphalt	16	281.78 km
6	9 July	11 July	3rd Rally Russia	Vyborg, Leningrad	Gravel	15	223.45 km
7	30 July	1 August	(Portugal) 50th Rali Vinho da Madeira	Funchal, Madeira	Asphalt	21	302.50 km
8	20 August	22 August	(Czech Republic) 39th Barum Rally Zlín	Zlín, Zlín Region	Asphalt	15	254.96 km
9	10 September	12 September	(Spain) 46th Rally Principe de Asturias	Oviedo, Asturias	Asphalt	15	253.72 km
10	24 September	26 September	(Italy) 51st Rallye Sanremo	Sanremo, Liguria	Asphalt	9	201.79 km
C	22 October	24 October	Rally Japan	Sapporo, Hokkaido	Gravel	??	??
11	19 November	21 November	(United Kingdom) 1st Rally of Scotland	Perth, Scotland	Gravel	13	204.50 km

The calendar had been increased from 10 events in 2008, to twelve in 2009. Out went the Istanbul Rally, the Rally de Portugal, the Rallye International du Valais and the China Rally. To be replaced by the Rallye Automobile Monte-Carlo, the Rally Internacional de Curitiba, the Safari Rally, the Rallye Açores, Rally Japan and the Rally of Scotland. Rally Japan was later cancelled, mainly because the major manufacturers looked unlikely to travel to Japan.

== Selected entries ==
Entrant	Constructor	Car	Driver	Co-driver	Rounds
(Belgium) Peugeot Team Belux	Peugeot	Peugeot 207 S2000	(France) Nicolas Vouilloz	(France) Nicolas Klinger	1–2, 4–5, 7–10
(Belgium) Peugeot Team Belux	Peugeot	Peugeot 207 S2000	(Belgium) Freddy Loix	(Belgium) Isidoor Smets	1–2
(Belgium) Peugeot Team Belux	Peugeot	Peugeot 207 S2000	(Belgium) Freddy Loix	(Belgium) Frédéric Miclotte	4–5, 7–10
(Belgium) Peugeot Team Belux	Peugeot	Peugeot 207 S2000	(Belgium) Pieter Tsjoen	(Belgium) Eddy Chevaillier	5
(France) Team Peugeot Total	Peugeot	Peugeot 207 S2000	(France) Stéphane Sarrazin	(France) Jacques-Julien Renucci	1
(France) Team Peugeot Total	Peugeot	Peugeot 207 S2000	(Portugal) Bruno Magalhães	(Portugal) Carlos Magalhães	4, 7
(Italy) H.F. Grifone SRL	Peugeot	Peugeot 207 S2000	(France) Didier Auriol	(France) Denis Giraudet	1
(Italy) H.F. Grifone SRL	Peugeot	Peugeot 207 S2000	(Italy) Corrado Fontana	(Italy) Carlo Cassina	5, 7–9
(Italy) H.F. Grifone SRL	Peugeot	Peugeot 207 S2000	(Italy) Luigi Fontana	(Italy) Tullio Vitali	7
(France) BF Goodrich Drivers Team	Peugeot	Peugeot 207 S2000	(France) Sébastien Ogier	(France) Julien Ingrassia	1
(France) BF Goodrich Drivers Team	Peugeot	Peugeot 207 S2000	(Belgium) Thierry Neuville	(Belgium) Achim Maraite	5
(France) BF Goodrich Drivers Team	Peugeot	Peugeot 207 S2000	(Czech Republic) Martin Prokop	(Czech Republic) Jan Tománek	8
(France) BF Goodrich Drivers Team	Peugeot	Peugeot 207 S2000	(Italy) Luca Cantamessa	(Italy) Piercarlo Capolongo	10
(France) BF Goodrich Drivers Team	Peugeot	Peugeot 207 S2000	(United Kingdom) Adam Gould	(United Kingdom) Sebastian Marshall	11
(United Kingdom) Peugeot UK	Peugeot	Peugeot 207 S2000	(United Kingdom) Kris Meeke	(Republic of Ireland) Paul Nagle	1–2, 4–5, 7–11
(Italy) F.P.F. Sport SRL	Peugeot	Peugeot 207 S2000	(Italy) Tobia Cavallini	(Italy) Flavio Zanella	1
(Italy) F.P.F. Sport SRL	Peugeot	Peugeot 207 S2000	(Italy) Paolo Andreucci	(Italy) Anna Andreussi	10
(Italy) F.P.F. Sport SRL	Peugeot	Peugeot 207 S2000	(Italy) Marco Signor	(Italy) Maurizio Barone	10
(France) PH Sport	Peugeot	Peugeot 207 S2000	(Zimbabwe) Conrad Rautenbach	(United Kingdom) Daniel Barritt	4
(France) PH Sport	Peugeot	Peugeot 207 S2000	(Luxembourg) Gilles Schammel	(Belgium) Renaud Jamoul	5
(Poland) Cersanit Rally Team	Peugeot	Peugeot 207 S2000	(Poland) Michał Sołowow	(Poland) Maciek Baran	5, 7–9
(Ukraine) Tsunami Rally Team	Peugeot	Peugeot 207 S2000	(Russia) Alexander Zheludov	(Ukraine) Iria Kolomeytseva	6
(Portugal) Team C.D. Nacional da Madeira/Olca	Peugeot	Peugeot 207 S2000	(Portugal) Alexandre Camacho	(Portugal) Padro Calado	7
(Czech Republic) Tescoma Rally Team	Peugeot	Peugeot 207 S2000	(Czech Republic) Roman Kresta	(Czech Republic) Petr Gross	8
(Hungary) Peugeot Total Hungaria	Peugeot	Peugeot 207 S2000	(Hungary) János Tóth	(Hungary) Robert Tagai	8
(Italy) Island Motorsport	Peugeot	Peugeot 207 S2000	(Italy) Ranato Travaglia	(Italy) Lorenzo Granai	10
(Italy) Abarth & C. Spa	Abarth	Fiat Abarth Grande Punto S2000	(Italy) Giandomenico Basso	(Italy) Mitia Dotta	1–2, 4–9
(Italy) Abarth & C. Spa	Abarth	Fiat Abarth Grande Punto S2000	(Italy) Luca Rossetti	(Italy) Matteo Chiarcossi	1, 7–8, 10
(Italy) Abarth & C. Spa	Abarth	Fiat Abarth Grande Punto S2000	(Finland) Anton Alén	(Finland) Timo Alanne	1–2, 4, 6
(Italy) Abarth & C. Spa	Abarth	Fiat Abarth Grande Punto S2000	(Belgium) Bernd Casier	(Belgium) Francis Caesemaeker	5
(Italy) Abarth & C. Spa	Abarth	Fiat Abarth Grande Punto S2000	(Spain) Miguel Fuster	(Spain) Jose Vicente Medina	9
(Italy) Abarth & C. Spa	Abarth	Fiat Abarth Grande Punto S2000	(Belgium) François Duval	(France) Denis Giraduet	10
(Italy) Abarth & C. Spa	Abarth	Fiat Abarth Grande Punto S2000	(Italy) Umberto Scandola	(Italy) Guido D'Amore	10
(Italy) Astra Racing	Abarth	Fiat Abarth Grande Punto S2000	(Finland) Toni Gardemeister	(Finland) Tomi Tuominen	1
(Italy) Astra Racing	Abarth	Fiat Abarth Grande Punto S2000	(France) Julien Maurin	(France) Gilles Thimonier	1
(Italy) Procar	Abarth	Fiat Abarth Grande Punto S2000	(Portugal) Bernardo Sousa	(Portugal) Jorge Carvalho	4, 7
(Italy) Procar	Abarth	Fiat Abarth Grande Punto S2000	(Republic of Ireland) Keith Cronin	(Republic of Ireland) Greg Shinnors	11
(Czech Republic) Škoda Motorsport	Škoda	Škoda Fabia S2000	(Finland) Juho Hänninen	(Finland) Mikko Markkula	1, 4–6, 8, 10
(Czech Republic) Škoda Motorsport	Škoda	Škoda Fabia S2000	(Czech Republic) Jan Kopecký	(Czech Republic) Petr Starý	1, 4–6, 8–10
(Belgium) René Georges Rally Sport	Škoda	Škoda Fabia S2000	(Belgium) François Duval	(France) Denis Giraudet	5
(Italy) Škoda Rally Team Italia	Škoda	Škoda Fabia S2000	(France) Julien Maurin	(France) Gilles Thimonier	7, 9–10
(Italy) Škoda Rally Team Italia	Škoda	Škoda Fabia S2000	(Italy) Piero Longhi	(Italy) Maurizio Imerito	10
(Czech Republic) Delimax Team	Škoda	Škoda Fabia S2000	(Czech Republic) Pavel Valoušek	(Czech Republic) Zdeněk Hrůza	8
(Italy) E-Art Rally Team	Škoda	Škoda Fabia S2000	(Russia) Evgeny Novikov	(Belgium) Stéphane Prévot	8
(Spain) A.C. Principado de Asturias	Škoda	Škoda Fabia S2000	(Spain) Alberto Hevia	(Spain) Alberto Iglesias	9
(United Kingdom) Škoda Motorsport UK	Škoda	Škoda Fabia S2000	(United Kingdom) Guy Wilks	(United Kingdom) Phil Pugh	11
(United Kingdom) Mellors Elliot Motorsport	Proton	Proton Satria Neo S2000	(United Kingdom) Guy Wilks	(United Kingdom) Phil Pugh	5–10
(United Kingdom) Mellors Elliot Motorsport	Proton	Proton Satria Neo S2000	(France) Bryan Bouffier	(France) Xavier Panseri	8
(United Kingdom) Mellors Elliot Motorsport	Proton	Proton Satria Neo S2000	(United Kingdom) Alister McRae	(Australia) Bill Hayes	11
(Austria) Interwetten Racing	Mitsubishi Ralliart	Mitsubishi Lancer Evo IX	(Austria) Franz Wittmann	(Austria) Bernhard Ettel	1, 4–6, 8–11
(France) BPS Racing	Mitsubishi Ralliart	Mitsubishi Lancer Evo IX	(France) Frédéric Romeyer	(France) Thomas Fournel	1
(Argentina) Tango Rally Team	Mitsubishi Ralliart	Mitsubishi Lancer Evo IX	(Argentina) Marcos Ligato	(Argentina) Rubén García	2
(Argentina) Tango Rally Team	Mitsubishi Ralliart	Mitsubishi Lancer Evo IX	(Argentina) Alejandro Cancio	(Argentina) Santiago García	2
(Kenya) Triton Team	Mitsubishi Ralliart	Mitsubishi Lancer Evo IX	(Kenya) Lee Rose	(Kenya) Nick Patel	3
(Kenya) Dalbit Team	Mitsubishi Ralliart	Mitsubishi Lancer Evo IX	(Kenya) Carl Tundo	(Kenya) Tim Jessop	3
(Kenya) Dalbit Team	Mitsubishi Ralliart	Mitsubishi Lancer Evo IX	(United Kingdom) Alastair Cavenagh	(Kenya) Saleem Haji	3
(Portugal) Team Além Mar	Mitsubishi Ralliart	Mitsubishi Lancer Evo IX	(Portugal) Ricardo Moura	(Portugal) Sancho Eiró	4
(Portugal) Team Além Mar	Mitsubishi Ralliart	Mitsubishi Lancer Evo IX	(Portugal) Ricardo Moura	(Portugal) Luís Ramalho	7
(Portugal) Team Além Mar	Mitsubishi Ralliart	Mitsubishi Lancer Evo IX	(Portugal) Ricardo Carmo	(Portugal) Justino Reis	4
(Portugal) Peres Competições	Mitsubishi Ralliart	Mitsubishi Lancer Evo IX	(Portugal) Fernando Peres	(Portugal) Jose Pedro Silva	4, 7
(Russia) Prosport	Mitsubishi Ralliart	Mitsubishi Lancer Evo IX	(Russia) Andrey Zhigunov	(Russia) Igor Ter-Oganesiants	6
(Czech Republic) EuroOil Čepro Czech National Team	Mitsubishi Ralliart	Mitsubishi Lancer Evo IX	(Czech Republic) Vaclav Pech	(Czech Republic) Petr Uhel	8
(United Kingdom) David Bogie Rallying	Mitsubishi Ralliart	Mitsubishi Lancer Evo IX	(United Kingdom) David Bogie	(United Kingdom) Kevin Rae	11
(United Kingdom) DGM Sport	Mitsubishi Ralliart	Mitsubishi Lancer Evo IX	(United Kingdom) Jonathan Greer	(United Kingdom) Dai Roberts	11
(Netherlands) Heuvel Motorsport	Mitsubishi Ralliart	Mitsubishi Lancer Evo X	(Netherlands) Jasper van den Heuvel	(Netherlands) Martine Kolman	5, 8
(South Africa) Sunvic	Volkswagen	Volkswagen Polo S2000	(South Africa) Lola Verlaque	(South Africa) Megan Verlaque	3
(Belgium) René Georges Rally Sport	Volkswagen	Volkswagen Polo S2000	(France) Julien Maurin	(France) Gilles Thimonier	4
(Belgium) Autostal Duindistel	Volkswagen	Volkswagen Polo S2000	(Belgium) Patrick Snijers	(Belgium) Cindy Cokelaere	5
(United Kingdom) Motor Sport Developments	Opel	Opel Corsa OPC S2000	(France) Alexandre Bengue	(France) Matthieu Baumel	5
(United Kingdom) Motor Sport Developments	Opel	Opel Corsa OPC S2000	(Norway) Andreas Mikkelsen	(Norway) Ola Fløene	8
(United Kingdom) Motor Sport Developments	Opel	Opel Corsa OPC S2000	(Finland) Toni Gardemeister	(Finland) Tomi Tuominen	9
(Russia) Lada Sport Rally	Honda	Honda Civic Type-R R3	(Estonia) Kaspar Koitla	(Estonia) Ain Heiskonen	6
(Russia) Lada Sport Rally	Honda	Honda Civic Type-R R3	(Estonia) Kaspar Koitla	(Estonia) Andres Ots	11
(Estonia) Aava-Sikk Youth Team	Honda	Honda Civic Type-R R3	(Estonia) Martin Kangur	(Estonia) Kuldar Sikk	11

== Results ==
Round	Rally name	Podium finishers			
Round	Rally name	Rank	Driver	Car	Time
1	(Monaco) / (France) Monte Carlo Rally (January 21–24) – Results and report	1	(France) Sébastien Ogier	Peugeot 207 S2000	4:40:45.7
1	(Monaco) / (France) Monte Carlo Rally (January 21–24) – Results and report	2	(Belgium) Freddy Loix	Peugeot 207 S2000	4:42:29.3
1	(Monaco) / (France) Monte Carlo Rally (January 21–24) – Results and report	3	(France) Stéphane Sarrazin	Peugeot 207 S2000	4:43:07.3
2	(Brazil) Rallye Internacional de Curitiba (March 5–7)	1	(United Kingdom) Kris Meeke	Peugeot 207 S2000	2:08:05.7
2	(Brazil) Rallye Internacional de Curitiba (March 5–7)	2	(France) Nicolas Vouilloz	Peugeot 207 S2000	2:08:31.9
2	(Brazil) Rallye Internacional de Curitiba (March 5–7)	3	(Italy) Giandomenico Basso	Fiat Abarth Grande Punto S2000	2:08:53.6
3	(Kenya) Safari Rally (April 3–4)	1	(Kenya) Carl Tundo	Mitsubishi Lancer Evo IX	2:47:25.0
3	(Kenya) Safari Rally (April 3–4)	2	(United Kingdom) Alastair Cavenagh	Mitsubishi Lancer Evo IX	2:48:42.0
3	(Kenya) Safari Rally (April 3–4)	3	(Kenya) Lee Rose	Mitsubishi Lancer Evo IX	2:48:51.0
4	(Portugal) Rally Açores (May 7–9)	1	(United Kingdom) Kris Meeke	Peugeot 207 S2000	2:36:48.3
4	(Portugal) Rally Açores (May 7–9)	2	(Czech Republic) Jan Kopecký	Škoda Fabia S2000	2:37:41.4
4	(Portugal) Rally Açores (May 7–9)	3	(France) Nicolas Vouilloz	Peugeot 207 S2000	2:37:53.1
5	Belgium Ypres Westhoek Rally (June 18–20)	1	(United Kingdom) Kris Meeke	Peugeot 207 S2000	2:32:16.3
5	Belgium Ypres Westhoek Rally (June 18–20)	2	(Czech Republic) Jan Kopecký	Škoda Fabia S2000	2:32:36.7
5	Belgium Ypres Westhoek Rally (June 18–20)	3	(Belgium) Freddy Loix	Peugeot 207 S2000	2:33:56.8
6	Rally Russia (July 9–11)	1	(Finland) Juho Hänninen	Škoda Fabia S2000	1:45:15.2
6	Rally Russia (July 9–11)	2	(Czech Republic) Jan Kopecký	Škoda Fabia S2000	1:46:36.1
6	Rally Russia (July 9–11)	3	(Italy) Giandomenico Basso	Fiat Abarth Grande Punto S2000	1:49:21:2
7	(Portugal) Rali Vinho da Madeira (July 30–August 1)	1	(Italy) Giandomenico Basso	Fiat Abarth Grande Punto S2000	3:09:55.4
7	(Portugal) Rali Vinho da Madeira (July 30–August 1)	2	(Portugal) Bruno Magalhães	Peugeot 207 S2000	3:09:58.9
7	(Portugal) Rali Vinho da Madeira (July 30–August 1)	3	(Portugal) Alexandre Camacho	Peugeot 207 S2000	3:10:37.1
8	(Czech Republic) Barum Czech Rally Zlín (August 21–23) Results and report	1	(Czech Republic) Jan Kopecký	Škoda Fabia S2000	2:24:21:1
8	(Czech Republic) Barum Czech Rally Zlín (August 21–23) Results and report	2	(United Kingdom) Kris Meeke	Peugeot 207 S2000	2:25:21.5
8	(Czech Republic) Barum Czech Rally Zlín (August 21–23) Results and report	3	(Finland) Juho Hänninen	Škoda Fabia S2000	2:26:21.9
9	(Spain) Rally Príncipe de Asturias (September 10–12)	1	(Czech Republic) Jan Kopecký	Škoda Fabia S2000	2:41:51.3
9	(Spain) Rally Príncipe de Asturias (September 10–12)	2	(United Kingdom) Kris Meeke	Peugeot 207 S2000	2:44:38.2
9	(Spain) Rally Príncipe de Asturias (September 10–12)	3	(France) Nicolas Vouilloz	Peugeot 207 S2000	2:44:40.8
10	(Italy) Rallye Sanremo (September 24–26)	1	(United Kingdom) Kris Meeke	Peugeot 207 S2000	2:20:03.5
10	(Italy) Rallye Sanremo (September 24–26)	2	(Italy) Luca Rossetti	Fiat Abarth Grande Punto S2000	2:20:19.2
10	(Italy) Rallye Sanremo (September 24–26)	3	(France) Nicolas Vouilloz	Peugeot 207 S2000	2:20:20.4
11	(United Kingdom) Rally Scotland (November 19–21) – Results and report	1	(United Kingdom) Guy Wilks	Škoda Fabia S2000	2:17:07.5
11	(United Kingdom) Rally Scotland (November 19–21) – Results and report	2	(United Kingdom) Alister McRae	Proton Satria Neo S2000	2:19:54.8
11	(United Kingdom) Rally Scotland (November 19–21) – Results and report	3	(United Kingdom) Jonathan Greer	Mitsubishi Lancer Evo IX	2:22:29.3

== Standings ==
=== Drivers ===
- Only the best seven scores from each driver count towards the championship.

Pos	Driver	MON (Monaco)	CUR (Brazil)	SAF (Kenya)	AZO (Portugal)	YPR (Belgium)	RUS (Russia)	MAD (Portugal)	ZLI (Czech Republic)	AST (Spain)	ITA (Italy)	SCO (United Kingdom)	T. Pts	Drop	Pts
1	(United Kingdom) Kris Meeke	Ret	1		1	1		5	2	4	1	DSQ	60		60
2	(Czech Republic) Jan Kopecký	4			2	2	2		1	1	Ret		49		49
3	(Belgium) Freddy Loix	2	4		4	3		6	Ret	6	4		37		37
4	(France) Nicolas Vouilloz	Ret	2		3	Ret		4	Ret	5	3		31		31
5	(Italy) Giandomenico Basso	5	3		Ret	8	3	1	Ret	11			28		28
6	(Finland) Juho Hänninen	Ret			Ret	5	1		3		8		21		21
7	(United Kingdom) Guy Wilks					Ret	5	11	Ret	22	13	1	15		15
8	(France) Sébastien Ogier	1											10		10
9	(Kenya) Carl Tundo			1									10		10
10	(Portugal) Bruno Magalhães				9			2					8		8
11	(Italy) Luca Rossetti	Ret						Ret	10		2		8		8
12	(United Kingdom) Alistair Cavenagh			2									8		8
13	(United Kingdom) Alister McRae											2	8		8
14	(Austria) Franz Wittmann	Ret			6	Ret	6		15	12	20	Ret	7		7
15	(Portugal) Alexandre Camacho							3					6		6
16	(United Kingdom) Jonathan Greer											3	6		6
17	(Kenya) Lee Rose			3									6		6
18	(France) Stéphane Sarrazin	3											6		6
19	(Estonia) Kaspar Koitla						10					5	6		6
20	(Czech Republic) Roman Kresta								4				5		5
21	(Belgium) Pieter Tsjoen					4							5		5
22	(Italy) Corrado Fontana					10		8	Ret	7			5		5
23	(Kenya) Asad Anwar			7									5		5
24	(Portugal) Fernando Peres				5			Ret					4		4
25	(Italy) Paolo Andreucci										5		4		4
26	(Argentina) Alejandro Cancio		5										4		4
27	(Czech Republic) Martin Prokop								5				4		4
28	(Republic of Ireland) Eamonn Boland											6	4		4
29	(Kenya) Alex Horsey			12									4		4
30	(France) Frédéric Romeyer	6											3		3
31	(Luxembourg) Gilles Schammel					6							3		3
32	(Italy) Renato Travaglia										6		3		3
33	(Czech Republic) Pavel Valoušek								6				3		3
34	(Finland) Anton Alén	Ret	Ret		18		7						3		3
35	(Spain) Alberto Hevia									8			3		3
36	(United Kingdom) William Bonniwell											9	3		3
37	(Brazil) Rafael Túlio		9										3		3
38	(Kenya) Quentin Mitchel			14									3		3
39	(Switzerland) Olivier Burri	7											2		2
40	(Netherlands) Jesper van den Heuvel					7							2		2
41	(Portugal) Miguel Nunes							7					2		2
42	(Zimbabwe) Conrad Rautenbach				7								2		2
43	(Hungary) Janos Toth								7				2		2
44	(Russia) Boris Zimin						8						2		2
45	(Poland) Michal Solowow					11		9	9	9			2		2
46	(Brazil) Luis Tedesco		10										2		2
47	(United Kingdom) Richard Nicoll											11	2		2
48	(Tanzania) Navraj Hans			16									2		2
49	(Portugal) Ricardo Moura				8			Ret					1		1
50	(Italy) Luca Cantamessa										8		1		1
51	(Czech Republic) Václav Pech								8				1		1
52	(France) Patrick Atrtru	9											1		1
53	(United Kingdom) Donnie MacDonald											12	1		1
54	(Brazil) Marcos Tokarski		12										1		1
55	(Kenya) Peter Horsey			18									1		1
Pos	Driver	MON (Monaco)	CUR (Brazil)	SAF (Kenya)	AZO (Portugal)	YPR (Belgium)	RUS (Russia)	MAD (Portugal)	ZLI (Czech Republic)	AST (Spain)	ITA (Italy)	SCO (United Kingdom)	T. Pts	Drop	Pts

Key
Colour	Result
Gold	Winner
Silver	2nd place
Bronze	3rd place
Green	Points finish
Blue	Non-points finish
Blue	Non-classified finish (NC)
Purple	Did not finish (Ret)
Black	Excluded (EX)
Black	Disqualified (DSQ)
White	Did not start (DNS)
White	Cancelled (C)
Blank	Withdrew entry from the event (WD)

=== Manufacturers ===
- Only the best seven scores from each manufacturer count towards the championship.

Pos	Manufacturer	MON (Monaco)	CUR (Brazil)	SAF (Kenya)	AZO (Portugal)	YPR (Belgium)	RUS (Russia)	MAD (Portugal)	ZLI (Czech Republic)	AST (Spain)	ITA (Italy)	SCO (United Kingdom)	T. Pts	Drop	Pts
1	(France) Peugeot	18	18	0	16	16	0	14	0	14	16	0	112		112
2	(Czech Republic) Škoda	5	0	0	8	12	18	0	16	13	0	10	82		82
3	(Japan) Ralliart	4	4	18	7	2	6	0	1	0	0	9	51	1	50
4	(Italy) Abarth	6	8	0	0	1	9	10	0	1	8	0	43		43
5	(Malaysia) Proton	0	0	0	0	0	5	0	0	0	0	8	13		13
6	(Japan) Honda	0	0	0	0	0	1	0	0	0	0	4	5		5
Pos	Manufacturer	MON (Monaco)	CUR (Brazil)	SAF (Kenya)	AZO (Portugal)	YPR (Belgium)	RUS (Russia)	MAD (Portugal)	ZLI (Czech Republic)	AST (Spain)	ITA (Italy)	SCO (United Kingdom)	T. Pts	Drop	Pts
