= Franz Wittmann Sr. =

Austrian rally driver (born 1950)

Franz Wittmann
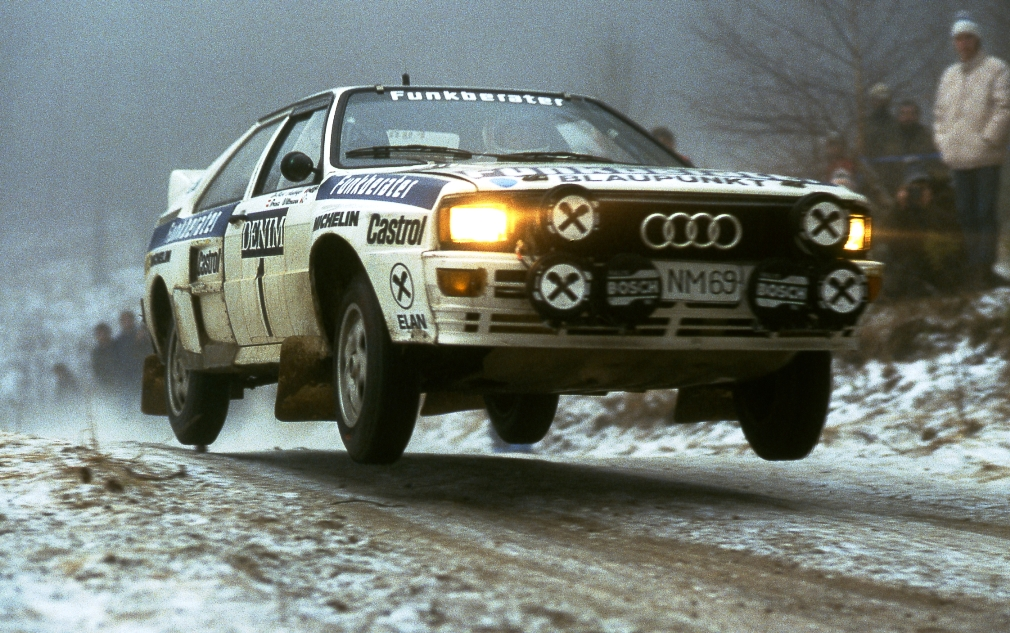
- Wittmann driving an Audi Quattro in 1984

Personal information
- Nationality: (Austria) Austrian
- Born: April 7, 1950 (age 76); Ramsau

World Rally Championship record
- Years active: 1973 – 1989
- Co-driver: (Austria) Hans Siebert (Austria) Helmut Deimel (Austria) Traude Schatzl (Austria) Hans Fennes (United Kingdom) John Morgan (Austria) Kurt Nestinger (Austria) Rudolf Stohl (West Germany) Peter Diekmann (Austria) Ferdinand Hinterleitner (Austria) Max Ogrisek (West Germany) Matthias Feltz (Austria) Jörg Pattermann
- Teams: Audi, Volkswagen
- Rallies: 33
- Championships: 0
- Rally wins: 1
- Podiums: 3
- Stage wins: 27
- Total points: 66
- First rally: 1973 Austrian Alpine Rally
- First win: 1987 Rally New Zealand
- Last rally: 1989 Rally Australia

Franz Wittmann (born 7 April 1950 in Ramsau) is an Austrian rally driver, who won the 1987 Rally New Zealand, a round of the World Rally Championship (WRC).

== Career ==
Wittmann began rallying in 1970. He competed mainly on a national level during his career, winning the Austrian championship 12 times between 1976 and 2001. He also won 32 rounds of the European Rally Championship, finishing second in the standings in 1978. As a test driver for Audi, he debuted the revolutionary Audi Quattro in 1981. He also competed as a factory Volkswagen driver in 1985 and 1986. In 1987 he won Rally New Zealand in a privately entered Lancia Delta HF 4WD. He competed on his final WRC event at the 1989 Rally Australia.

Wittmann was involved in a severe accident at the 1981 Rally Finland. He failed to spot the finish sign at the end of the Ehikki stage and crashed into race officials. One of those hit was Raul Falin, the president of AKK-Motorsport and the Finnish delegate at FISA, who died in the crash. Wittmann was charged with involuntary manslaughter, but was acquitted by Finnish courts.

Wittmann's son Franz Jr. also competes in rallying.

== WRC victories ==
#	Event	Season	Co-driver	Car
1	18th Rally New Zealand	1987	Jörg Pattermann	Lancia Delta HF 4WD
