= Kris Meeke =

Irish rally driver (born 1979)

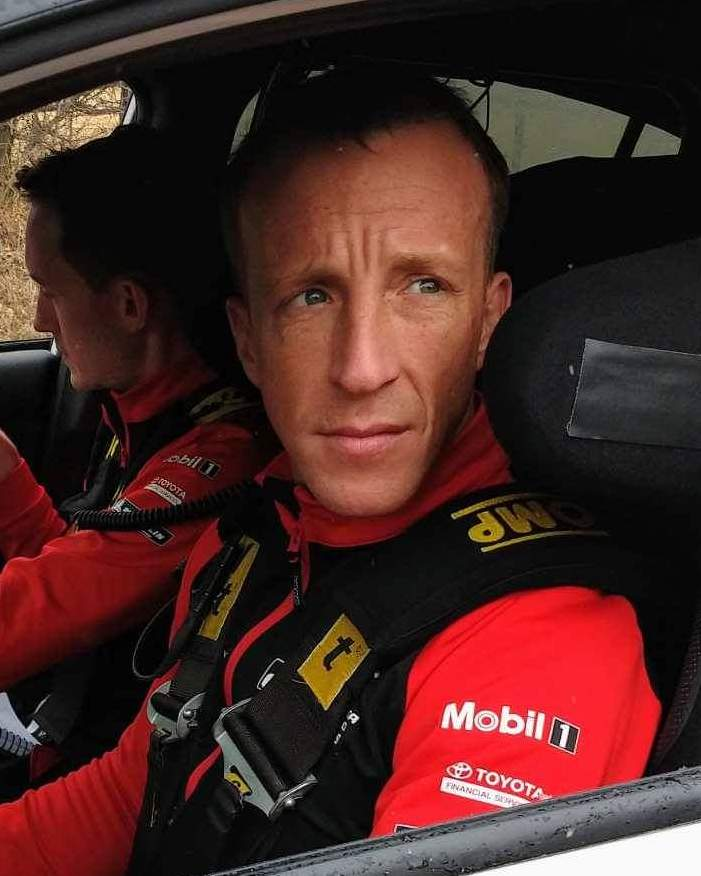
- Meeke in 2019

Personal information
- Nationality: (Republic of Ireland) Irish
- Born: 2 July 1979 (age 47); Dungannon, Ireland

World Rally Championship record
- Years active: 2002–2008, 2011, 2013–2019
- Co-driver: (United Kingdom) Glenn Patterson (United Kingdom) Chris Patterson (United Kingdom) David Senior (Republic of Ireland) Paul Nagle (United Kingdom) Sebastian Marshall (Republic of Ireland) James Fulton (United Kingdom) Stuart Loudon
- Teams: Mini WRC Team, Citroën Abu Dhabi WRT, Toyota Gazoo Racing WRT
- Rallies: 106
- Championships: 0
- Rally wins: 5
- Podiums: 13
- Stage wins: 94
- Total points: 511
- First rally: 2002 Rally GB
- First win: 2015 Rally Argentina
- Last win: 2017 Rally Catalunya
- Last rally: 2025 Rally de Portugal

Kris Meeke (born 2 July 1979) is an Irish rally driver, best known for competing in the FIA World Rally Championship (WRC). He was the 2009 Intercontinental Rally Challenge champion. His co-driver is Seb Marshall. He began his career as a computer aided designer with M-Sport, at the headquarters of the Ford World Rally Team, before moving on to competing in the Peugeot Super 106 Cup in 2001.

In 2011, Meeke debuted in the World Rally Championship driving a MINI for Prodrive. His first event was the Rally d'Italia Sardegna which was held between 5–8 May. Meeke scored his first WRC points and won the Power Stage at the 2011 Rally Catalunya. His maiden WRC win was at the 2015 Rally Argentina.

== Career ==
Meeke, son of rally engineer Sydney Meeke, was born in Dungannon, Northern Ireland, and educated at the Royal School Dungannon. He later went on to study at Queen's University, Belfast, where he obtained a degree in mechanical engineering. He initially worked for M-Sport as a computer aided designer. He took his first step into rallying in 2000, when he won a Peugeot competition for new rally drivers.

Meeke's debut event was the Bulldog Rally held in North Wales, even leading the event for a time. After mixed results, his first victory came on the third round of the 2001 Peugeot Super 106 Cup, the Swansea Bay Festival National Rally. In early 2002, Meeke's career was boosted when he was taken under the wing of the late Colin McRae and contested the British Junior Championship in a Ford Puma. In June, Meeke won in his category in the Scottish Rally after a calculated drive overseen by McRae, and took second on the Jim Clark Rally, his first full tarmac event. Third position in the final round of the series was however enough for Meeke to claim the British Junior Rally Championship title in only his second season in the sport, as well as third in the British S1600 series.

=== Junior World Rally Championship ===
The following year, Meeke moved up to the Junior World Rally Championship (JWRC), driver an Opel Corsa run by Team Palmer. He made an impressive debut setting the fastest time on two of the final leg stages however a string of minor problems dropped Meeke down the order. He retired in the next rally and a potential second-place finish in Italy was lost after a crash. Shortly afterwards he claimed consolation by winning the British S1600 title. On the final round of the 2003 JWRC held in Britain, Meeke was running in 2nd place in the JWRC and in 17th position overall before being forced to retire after hitting a rock and rolling his car.

Meeke kicked the 2004 season off in style by finishing 3rd in class in the Rally of Monte Carlo. He then took part in the British S1600 event in Wales as a shakedown for the next JWRC in Greece, winning the Welsh event along the way. The next two JWRC events in Greece and Turkey were marred by mechanical problems on the rough gravel terrain. He then took part in the Pirelli Rally in Tampere as shakedown for the next JWRC event in Finland, scoring a class win in Pirelli Rally. He was leading the Finnish JWRC event before a mistake caused him to crash and retire. A spirited drive saw him set seven fastest stage times and finish on the podium in second place.

=== Intercontinental Rally Challenge ===
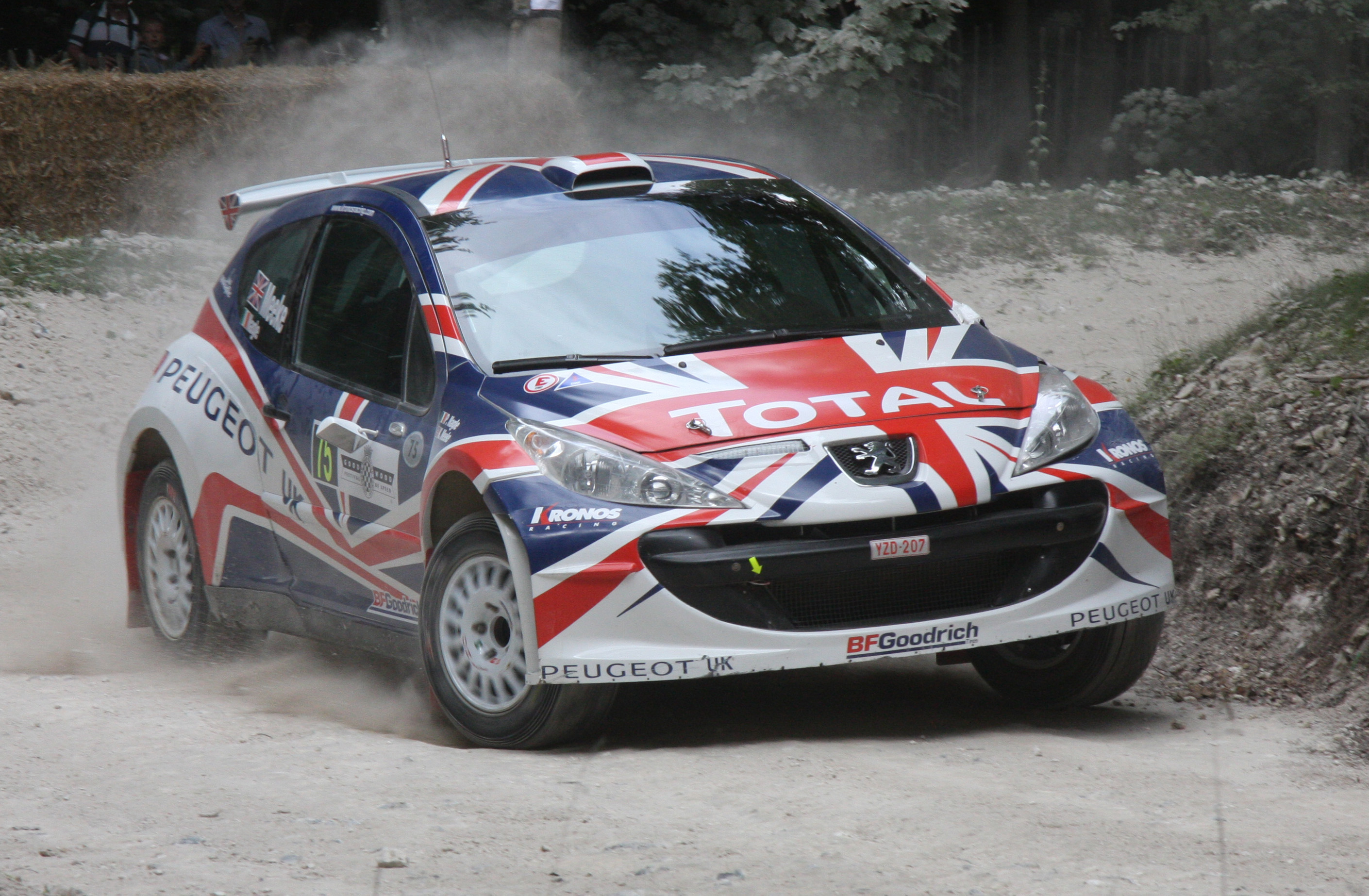
Meeke in the Peugeot 207

In 2009, Meeke alongside co-driver Paul Nagle contested the Intercontinental Rally Challenge (IRC) in a Peugeot UK backed 207 S2000, run by the Belgian Kronos Racing team. He crashed out heavily on the Monte Carlo Rally but went on to win the next three rounds he competed in at Brazil, Portugal, and Belgium. He won the championship at the penultimate round by winning Rally Sanremo in Italy, after his closest rival Jan Kopecky crashed on the second stage.

Meeke finished off the season with a dominant win of the inaugural Rally Scotland, winning 7 of the 13 stages on the way to victory. He starred in a wave of adverts for the Peugeot 207 in 2009, with the tagline "He's Meeke, but he's not mild". For 2010, Meeke continued his successful partnership with Paul Nagle and Peugeot, competing in 10 rounds of the IRC.

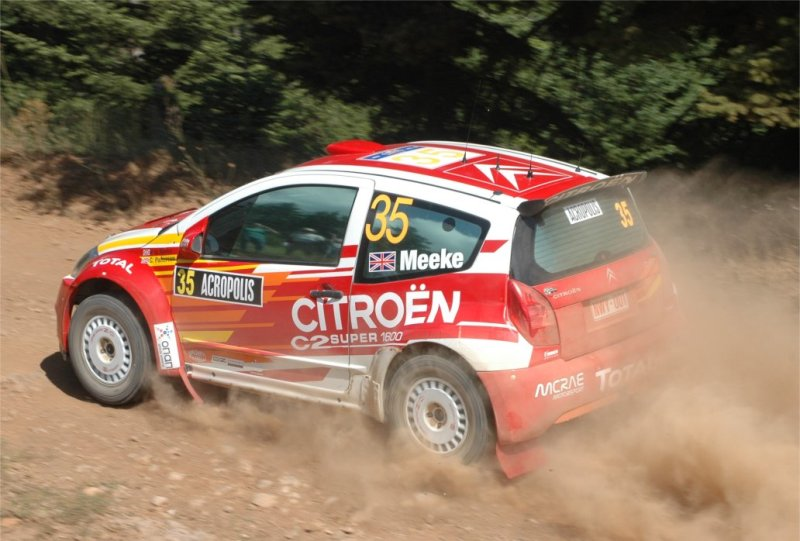
Meeke with a Citroën C2 S1600 at the 2005 Acropolis Rally

=== World Rally Championship ===
==== Mini (2011) ====
On 2 September 2010, Autosport magazine announced that Meeke had signed for the Prodrive team that would run MINI World Rally Championship (WRC) return in 2011. Meeke scored his first WRC points and won the Power Stage at the 2011 Rally Catalunya. Meeke came close to gaining his maiden podium at the final round of the season, the 2011 Rally GB but spun on the Power Stage allowing Henning Solberg to take third place.

Meeke appeared in an edition of the BBC show Top Gear in a challenge similar to that of Henning Solberg driving a rally car against the Norwegian Olympic Bobsleigh team. Meeke rallied a Mini John Cooper Works WRC on a downhill snow track in a race against skeleton competitor Amy Williams at the Lillehammer Olympic Bobsleigh and Luge Track. Williams raced down the bobsleigh track whilst Meeke's route ran downhill alongside. With Top Gear presenter James May as his "co-driver," Meeke set a time of 59.73 in the Mini, beating Williams who finished with a time of 1:01.04.

On 22 December 2011, Meeke was dropped from the Mini WRC Team for the following month's Monte Carlo Rally in a crisis within the Prodrive-run team over budget for the 2012 season.

==== Citroën (2013–2018) ====
Meeke returned to the WRC in the 2013 Rally Finland, driving for the Abu Dhabi Citroën Total World Rally Team as a stand in for Khalid Al Qassimi.

Meeke was running comfortably in fifth place and set for an impressive points earning finish on his WRC return before rolling in the final section of the penultimate stage of the rally. Meeke would once again drive a Citroën DS3 WRC in September during the 2013 Rally Australia taking the place of works driver Dani Sordo. After completing his first full season in 2014 in the Citroën team, Meeks finished 7th in the standings with 4 podiums to his name. He remained with Citroën for 2015 alongside Mads Ostberg, with Sebastian Loeb also joining him in Monte Carlo. In Monte he finished 10th, winning 3 stages in the rally and the power stage among them. He won his maiden rally in Argentina, ending a 13-year drought of British winners of a WRC event. After winning, dedicated his win to 1995 World Champion Colin McRae, who supported him during his career until McRae's death in a helicopter crash in 2007. At the end of the 2015 season, Meeke finished 5th in the standings, just behind teammate Mads Ostberg, with 112 points to his name. On 16 December it was announced that Meeke would have a 3-year contract with Citroën, up until the end of 2018.

It was announced that Meeke would only compete in eight rounds in the 2016 season, in order to focus on development of the Citroën C3 WRC that would be introduced in 2017. Meeke won two rallies in 2016, in Portugal and in Finland, the latter breaking a record for the highest average speed in a WRC rally. Kris Meeke also became the first driver from United Kingdom to win the famous and fast Rally Finland. Meeke had hoped that his 2016 schedule would allow him to challenge for the 2017 title.

The opening two rounds of 2017 proved frustrating for Meeke, crashing out in Monte Carlo and finishing 12th in Rally Sweden. Meeke took a win in Rally Mexico, despite a mistake in the final kilometre. He had gone into the Power Stage with a 37.2 second lead over Sébastien Ogier, but slid off track on a fast right hander, ending up in a car park. The incident cut his lead to 13.8 seconds, Meeke rejoining the stage through a gap in a hedge.

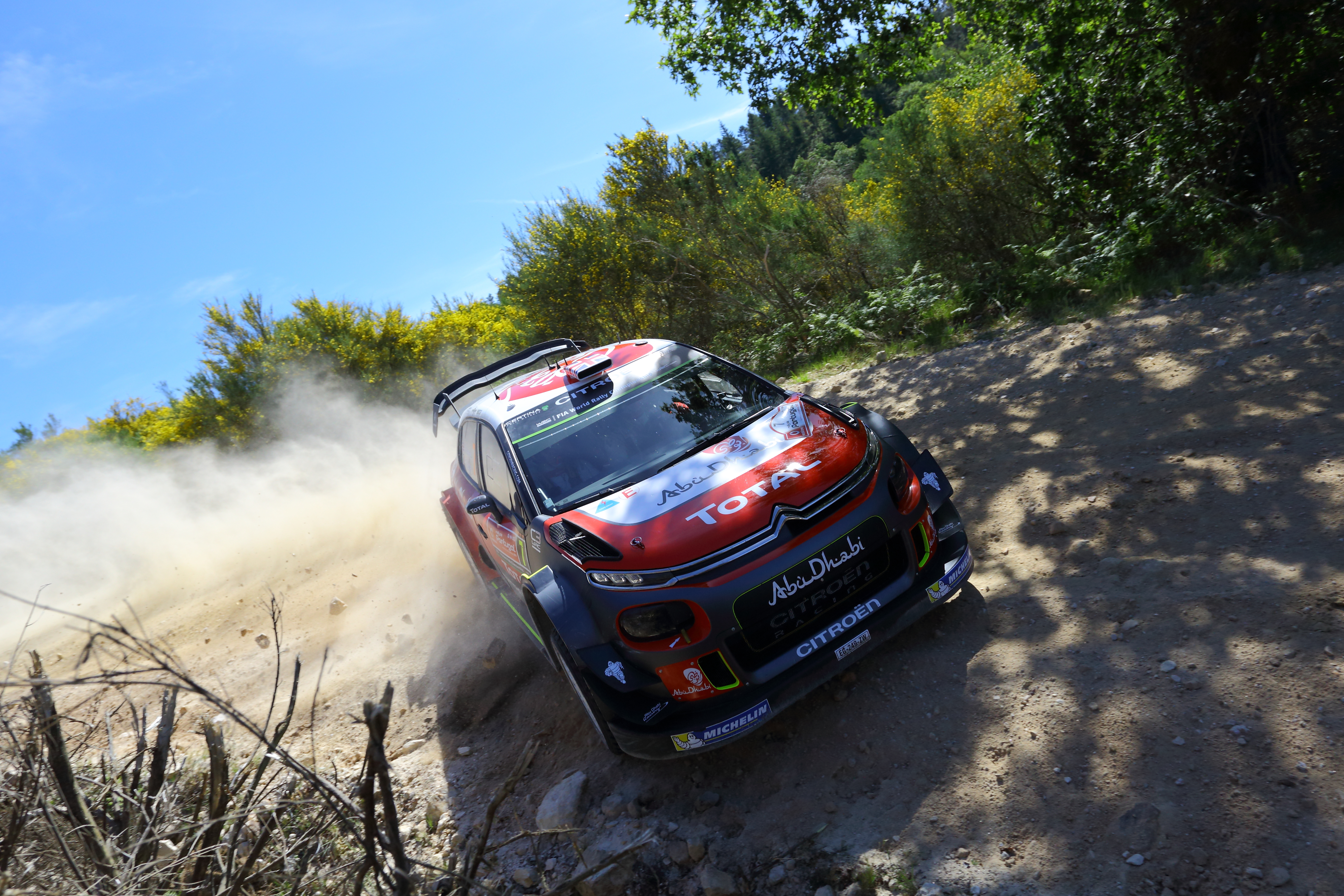
Meeke in the Citroën C3 WRC at the 2017 Rally de Portugal

Meeke led the next rally, the Tour de Corse, but retired from the lead with an engine problem on the Novella stage. At Rally Argentina, Meeke retired again. He rolled his C3 twice in the course of the rally, one of these times seeing the car rolling 14 times, which he described as "the biggest." He was replaced with Andreas Mikkelsen for Rally Poland, which team principal Yves Matton described as being 'in the best interests of the team." Meeke returned for Rally Finland, but struggled for confidence and eventually finished eighth, whilst teammate Craig Breen challenged for a podium. This was followed up by a crash on the Thursday evening super special stage on Rallye Deutschland, ruining any chance of scoring points. He eventually retired on day 2 with a mechanical issue. However, at the next round in Spain, Meeke took the lead from Andreas Mikkelsen on the second day and steadily pulled away from the rest of the field to take a second victory of the season.

Meeke was retained by Citroën for the 2018 championship and was the only Citroën driver scheduled to contest all thirteen rallies. However, the team released him from his contract after six rounds following a series of crashes. Team principal Pierre Budar was critical of what he called an "excessively high" number of accidents that came about when Meeke took "unjustified risks" considering his position at the time of the accidents.

==== Toyota (2018–2019) ====
On 17 October 2018, Toyota Gazoo Racing WRT announced Meeke would drive the Toyota Yaris World Rally Car.

On 27 November 2019, Meeke confirmed that he was leaving Toyota.

== Rally victories ==
=== WRC victories ===
#	Event	Season	Co-driver	Car
1	35th Rally Argentina	2015	(Republic of Ireland) Paul Nagle	Citroën DS3 WRC
2	50º Rally de Portugal	2016	(Republic of Ireland) Paul Nagle	Citroën DS3 WRC
3	66th Rally Finland	2016	(Republic of Ireland) Paul Nagle	Citroën DS3 WRC
4	(Mexico) 31º Rally Guanajuato México	2017	(Republic of Ireland) Paul Nagle	Citroën C3 WRC
5	(Spain) 53° RallyRACC Catalunya - Costa Daurada	2017	(Republic of Ireland) Paul Nagle	Citroën C3 WRC

=== JWRC victories ===
No.	Event	Season	Co-driver	Car
1	(Monaco) 73ème Rallye Automobile de Monte-Carlo	2005	(United Kingdom) Chris Patterson	Citroën C2 S1600
2	(Germany) 25. Rallye Deutschland	2006	(United Kingdom) Glenn Patterson	Citroën C2 S1600

=== IRC victories ===
No.	Event	Season	Co-driver	Car
1	(Brazil) 29. Rally Internacional de Curitiba	2009	(Republic of Ireland) Paul Nagle	Peugeot 207 S2000
2	(Portugal) 44. SATA Rallye Açores	2009	(Republic of Ireland) Paul Nagle	Peugeot 207 S2000
3	45. Belgium Ypres Westhoek Rally	2009	(Republic of Ireland) Paul Nagle	Peugeot 207 S2000
4	(Italy) 51° Rallye Sanremo	2009	(Republic of Ireland) Paul Nagle	Peugeot 207 S2000
5	(Brazil) 30. Rally Internacional de Curitiba	2010	(Republic of Ireland) Paul Nagle	Peugeot 207 S2000

== Results ==
=== WRC results ===
Year	Entrant	Car	1	2	3	4	5	6	7	8	9	10	11	12	13	14	15	16	WDC	Points
2002	Kris Meeke	Ford Puma S1600	MON	SWE	FRA	ESP	CYP	ARG	GRE	KEN	FIN	GER	ITA	NZL	AUS	GBR; Ret			NC	0
2003	Kris Meeke	Opel Corsa S1600	MON; 29	SWE	TUR; Ret	NZL	ARG	GRE; Ret	CYP	GER	FIN; Ret	AUS	ITA; Ret	FRA	ESP; 19	GBR; Ret			NC	0
2004	Kris Meeke	Opel Corsa S1600	MON; 14	SWE	MEX	NZL	CYP	GRE; Ret	TUR; Ret	ARG	FIN; Ret	GER	JPN	GBR; 20	ITA; 16	FRA			NC	0
2004	Kris Meeke	Citroën C2 S1600															ESP; 25	AUS	NC	0
2005	Kris Meeke	Citroën C2 S1600	MON; 11	SWE	MEX	NZL	ITA; 20	CYP	TUR	GRE; 26	ARG	FIN; 39	GER; 14		JPN	FRA; 25	ESP; 28	AUS	NC	0
2005	Kris Meeke	Subaru Impreza WRC												GBR; 9					NC	0
2006	Kris Meeke	Citroën C2 S1600	MON	SWE	MEX	ESP; 19	FRA; Ret	ARG	ITA	GRE	GER; 16	FIN; Ret	JPN	CYP	TUR; 20	AUS	NZL	GBR; Ret	NC	0
2007	Kris Meeke	Subaru Impreza WRC	MON	SWE	NOR	MEX	POR	ARG	ITA	GRE	FIN	GER	NZL	ESP	FRA	JPN	IRE; Ret	GBR	NC	0
2008	Kris Meeke	Renault Clio S1600	MON	SWE	MEX	ARG	JOR	ITA	GRE	TUR	FIN	GER; 24							NC	0
2008	Interspeed Racing Team	Renault Clio R3											NZL	ESP; Ret	FRA	JPN	GBR		NC	0
2011	Mini WRC Team	Mini John Cooper Works WRC	SWE	MEX	POR	JOR	ITA; Ret	ARG	GRE	FIN; Ret	GER; Ret	AUS	FRA; Ret	ESP; 5	GBR; 4				11th	25
2013	Abu Dhabi Citroën Total WRT	Citroën DS3 WRC	MON	SWE	MEX	POR	ARG	GRE	ITA	FIN; Ret	GER	AUS; Ret	FRA	ESP	GBR				NC	0
2014	Citroën Total Abu Dhabi WRT	Citroën DS3 WRC	MON; 3	SWE; 10	MEX; Ret	POR; Ret	ARG; 3	ITA; 18	POL; 7	FIN; 3	GER; Ret	AUS; 4	FRA; 3	ESP; 19	GBR; 6				7th	92
2015	Citroën Total Abu Dhabi WRT	Citroën DS3 WRC	MON; 10	SWE; 7	MEX; 16	ARG; 1	POR; 4	ITA; 24	POL; 7	FIN; 17	GER; 12	AUS; 3	FRA; 4	ESP; 5	GBR; 2				5th	112
2016	Abu Dhabi Total WRT	Citroën DS3 WRC	MON; Ret	SWE; 23	MEX	ARG	POR; 1	ITA	POL	FIN; 1	GER	CHN; C	FRA; 16	ESP; Ret	GBR; 5	AUS			9th	64
2017	Citroën Total Abu Dhabi WRT	Citroën C3 WRC	MON; Ret	SWE; 12	MEX; 1	FRA; Ret	ARG; Ret	POR; 18	ITA; Ret	POL	FIN; 8	GER; Ret	ESP; 1	GBR; 7	AUS; 7				7th	77
2018	Citroën Total Abu Dhabi WRT	Citroën C3 WRC	MON; 4	SWE; Ret	MEX; 3	FRA; 9	ARG; 7	POR; Ret	ITA; WD	FIN	GER	TUR	GBR	ESP	AUS				14th	43
2019	Toyota Gazoo Racing WRT	Toyota Yaris WRC	MON; 6	SWE; 6	MEX; 5	FRA; 9	ARG; 4	CHL; 10	POR; Ret	ITA; 8	FIN; Ret	GER; 2	TUR; 7	GBR; 4	ESP; 29	AUS; C			6th	98
2023	Sports & You	Hyundai i20 N Rally2	MON	SWE	MEX	CRO	POR; Ret	ITA	KEN	EST	FIN	GRE	CHL	EUR	JPN				NC	0
2024	Sports & You	Hyundai i20 N Rally2	MON	SWE	KEN	CRO	POR; Ret	ITA	POL	LAT	FIN	GRE	CHL	EUR	JPN				NC	0

==== JWRC results ====
Year	Entrant	Car	1	2	3	4	5	6	7	8	9	Pos.	Points
2003	Kris Meeke	Opel Corsa S1600	MON; 12	TUR; Ret	GRE; Ret	FIN; Ret	ITA; Ret	ESP; 2	GBR; Ret			14th	8
2004	Kris Meeke	Opel Corsa S1600	MON; 3	GRE; Ret	TUR; Ret	FIN; Ret	GBR; 2	ITA; 7				7th	19
2004	Kris Meeke	Citroën C2 S1600							ESP; 25			7th	19
2005	Kris Meeke	Citroën C2 S1600	MON; 1	MEX	ITA; 3	GRE; 6	FIN; 7	GER; 2	FRA; 8	ESP; 7		3rd	32
2006	Kris Meeke	Citroën C2 S1600	SWE	ESP; 3	FRA; Ret	ARG	ITA	GER; 1	FIN; Ret	TUR; 5	GBR; Ret	7th	20
2008	Interspeed Racing Team	Renault Clio R3	MEX	JOR	ITA	FIN	GER	ESP; Ret	FRA			NC	0

=== IRC results ===
Year	Entrant	Car	1	2	3	4	5	6	7	8	9	10	11	12	WDC	Points
2009	Peugeot UK	Peugeot 207 S2000	MON; Ret	BRA; 1	KEN	POR; 1	BEL; 1	RUS	POR; 5	CZE; 2	ESP; 2	ITA; 1	SCO; DSQ		1st	66
2010	Peugeot UK	Peugeot 207 S2000	MON; Ret	BRA; 1	ARG; Ret	CAN; 4	ITA; Ret	BEL; Ret	AZO; 2	MAD; Ret	CZE; 4	ITA; 4	SCO; 3	CYP	3rd	39

=== Dakar Rally ===
Year	Class	Vehicle	Position	Stages won
2021	Light Prototype	(France) PH Sport	12th	4
2024	Challenger	(Belgium) OT3	DNF	0

Sporting positions
Preceded by Nicolas Vouilloz	Intercontinental Rally Challenge Champion; 2009	Succeeded by Juho Hänninen
Awards and achievements
Preceded by Sebastian Vettel	Autosport; Rookie of the Year; 2009	Succeeded by Kamui Kobayashi
