= 2010 Rali Vinho da Madeira =

Motor rally competition

2010 Rali Vinho da Madeira Rali Vinho da Madeira
Round 8 of the 2010 Intercontinental Rally Challenge season
← Previous event	Next event →
- Rali Vinho da Madeira Logo
- Host country: Portugal
- Rally base: Funchal, Madeira
- Dates run: August 5 – 7 2010
- Stages: 21 (298.20 km; 185.29 miles)
- Stage surface: Asphalt
- Overall distance: 898.88 km (558.54 miles)

Statistics
- Crews: 46 at start, 27 at finish

Overall results
- Overall winner: (Belgium) Freddy Loix (Belgium) Freddy Loix

The 2010 Rali Vinho da Madeira (Madeira Wine Rally), was the eighth round of the 2010 Intercontinental Rally Challenge (IRC) season. The 21 stage asphalt rally took place on the island of Madeira between 5 – 7 August 2010 with all stages running in daylight.

== Introduction ==
The rally was based in Funchal, which is the largest city on the island of Madeira. The Thursday evening had a single stage, the 2.18 km (1.35 mi) Avenida Do Mar stage, which was the only stage that was run once during the event. Friday consisted of twelve stages covering 183.04 km (113.74 mi) with a further eight stages on the Saturday covering 115.16 km (71.56 mi). The top four protagonists of the IRC; Juho Hänninen, Jan Kopecký, Bruno Magalhães and Kris Meeke took part in the event, while Guy Wilks did not take part due to an injury sustained at the Rally d'Italia Sardegna.

== Results ==
Freddy Loix joined Juho Hänninen as a two-time winner in the 2010 IRC season with victory in Madeira, with a comfortable victory of nearly 40 seconds over Jan Kopecký. His victory, the fifth of his IRC career, tied the record of Kris Meeke for number of victories in the series. Loix, who claimed fourteen stage victories during the event, fought off the challenges of the other Škodas, Luca Rossetti's Abarth and Meeke's Peugeot. Rossetti crashed out of the event during the second run through the Cidade de Santana stage, while Meeke retired on stage 17 due to a mechanical problem, two stages after breaking an alternator belt. Behind Loix and Kopecký, Hänninen finished third but still holds a seven-point lead over Kopecký in the championship.

=== Overall ===
Pos.	Driver	Co-driver	Car	Time	Difference	Points
1.	(Belgium) Freddy Loix	(Belgium) Fréderic Miclotte	Škoda Fabia S2000	3:08:14.3	0.0	10
2.	(Czech Republic) Jan Kopecký	(Czech Republic) Petr Starý	Škoda Fabia S2000	3:08:52.1	37.8	8
3.	(Finland) Juho Hänninen	(Finland) Mikko Markkula	Škoda Fabia S2000	3:10:40.1	2:25.8	6
4.	(Portugal) Miguel Nunes	(Portugal) Victor Calado	Peugeot 207 S2000	3:10:57.0	2:42.7	5
5.	(Portugal) Vítor Sá	(Portugal) Nuno Rodrigues	Peugeot 207 S2000	3:11:28.0	3:13.7	4
6.	(Portugal) Filipe Freitas	(Portugal) Daniel Figueiroa	Mitsubishi Lancer Evolution X	3:17:17.5	9:03.2	3
7.	(Portugal) João Magalhães	(Portugal) Jorge Pereira	Mitsubishi Lancer Evolution X	3:17:43.3	9:29.0	2
8. (9.)	(Portugal) Pedro Peres	(Portugal) Tiago Ferreira	Mitsubishi Lancer Evolution IX	3:18:54.1	10:39.8	1

=== Special stages ===
Day	Stage	Time	Name	Length	Winner	Time	Avg. spd.	Rally leader
Leg 1 (5–6 Aug)	SS1	19:30	Avenida Do Mar	2.18 km	(United Kingdom) Kris Meeke	1:37.2	80.74 km/h	(United Kingdom) Kris Meeke
Leg 1 (5–6 Aug)	SS2	09:01	Campo de Golfe 1	15.99 km	(Belgium) Freddy Loix	10:04.8	95.18 km/h	(Belgium) Freddy Loix
Leg 1 (5–6 Aug)	SS3	09:39	Terreiros 1	21.77 km	(Italy) Luca Rossetti	13:41.5	95.40 km/h	(Italy) Luca Rossetti
Leg 1 (5–6 Aug)	SS4	11:24	Campo de Golfe 2	15.99 km	(Belgium) Freddy Loix	9:54.7	96.80 km/h	(Belgium) Freddy Loix
Leg 1 (5–6 Aug)	SS5	12:02	Terreiros 2	21.77 km	(Italy) Luca Rossetti	13:32.6	96.45 km/h	(Italy) Luca Rossetti
Leg 1 (5–6 Aug)	SS6	13:42	Serra D'Água 1	13.77 km	(Belgium) Freddy Loix	8:31.6	96.90 km/h	(Italy) Luca Rossetti
Leg 1 (5–6 Aug)	SS7	14:18	Boaventura 1	10.76 km	(Belgium) Freddy Loix	6:32.0	98.82 km/h	(Belgium) Freddy Loix
Leg 1 (5–6 Aug)	SS8	14:44	Cidade de Santana 1	13.85 km	(Belgium) Freddy Loix	8:46.7	94.66 km/h	(Belgium) Freddy Loix
Leg 1 (5–6 Aug)	SS9	15:19	Referta 1	14.29 km	(Italy) Luca Rossetti	9:53.4	86.69 km/h	(Belgium) Freddy Loix
Leg 1 (5–6 Aug)	SS10	17:02	Serra D'Água 2	13.77 km	(Belgium) Freddy Loix	8:26.1	97.95 km/h	(Belgium) Freddy Loix
Leg 1 (5–6 Aug)	SS11	17:38	Boaventura 2	10.76 km	(Italy) Luca Rossetti	6:28.4	99.73 km/h	(Belgium) Freddy Loix
Leg 1 (5–6 Aug)	SS12	18:04	Cidade de Santana 2	13.85 km	(Belgium) Freddy Loix	8:44.5	95.06 km/h	(Belgium) Freddy Loix
Leg 1 (5–6 Aug)	SS13	18:39	Referta 2	14.29 km	(Belgium) Freddy Loix	9:47.8	87.52 km/h	(Belgium) Freddy Loix
Leg 2 (7 Aug)	SS14	08:31	Paúl 1	10.92 km	(Belgium) Freddy Loix	7:07.5	91.96 km/h	(Belgium) Freddy Loix
Leg 2 (7 Aug)	SS15	09:21	Ponta do Pargo 1	13.13 km	(Belgium) Freddy Loix	7:55.2	99.47 km/h	(Belgium) Freddy Loix
Leg 2 (7 Aug)	SS16	10:08	Rosário 1	11.52 km	(United Kingdom) Kris Meeke	7:09.1	96.65 km/h	(Belgium) Freddy Loix
Leg 2 (7 Aug)	SS17	11:48	Chão da Lagoa 1	22.01 km	(Belgium) Freddy Loix	13:43.5	96.22 km/h	(Belgium) Freddy Loix
Leg 2 (7 Aug)	SS18	13:52	Paúl 2	10.92 km	(Belgium) Freddy Loix	7:06.2	92.24 km/h	(Belgium) Freddy Loix
Leg 2 (7 Aug)	SS19	14:42	Ponta do Pargo 2	13.13 km	(Belgium) Freddy Loix	7:54.1	99.70 km/h	(Belgium) Freddy Loix
Leg 2 (7 Aug)	SS20	15:29	Rosário 2	11.52 km	(Czech Republic) Jan Kopecký	7:10.4	96.36 km/h	(Belgium) Freddy Loix
Leg 2 (7 Aug)	SS21	16:27	Chão da Lagoa 2	22.01 km	(Belgium) Freddy Loix	13:49.0	95.58 km/h	(Belgium) Freddy Loix
