= Rally Scotland =

Scottish rallying competition

- Status: Ongoing
- Genre: Motorsporting event
- Frequency: Annual
- Location: Aberdeen
- Country: United Kingdom
- Inaugurated: 2009
- Website: rallyscotland.org

Rally Scotland is a rally competition held in Scotland. From 2009 to 2011, it was held in Perth, Scotland as a round of the Intercontinental Rally Challenge (IRC). A new event is planned to be held in Aberdeen from 2027 onwards as a part of the World Rally Championship (WRC).

== History ==
=== 2009–2011: An IRC event in Perth ===
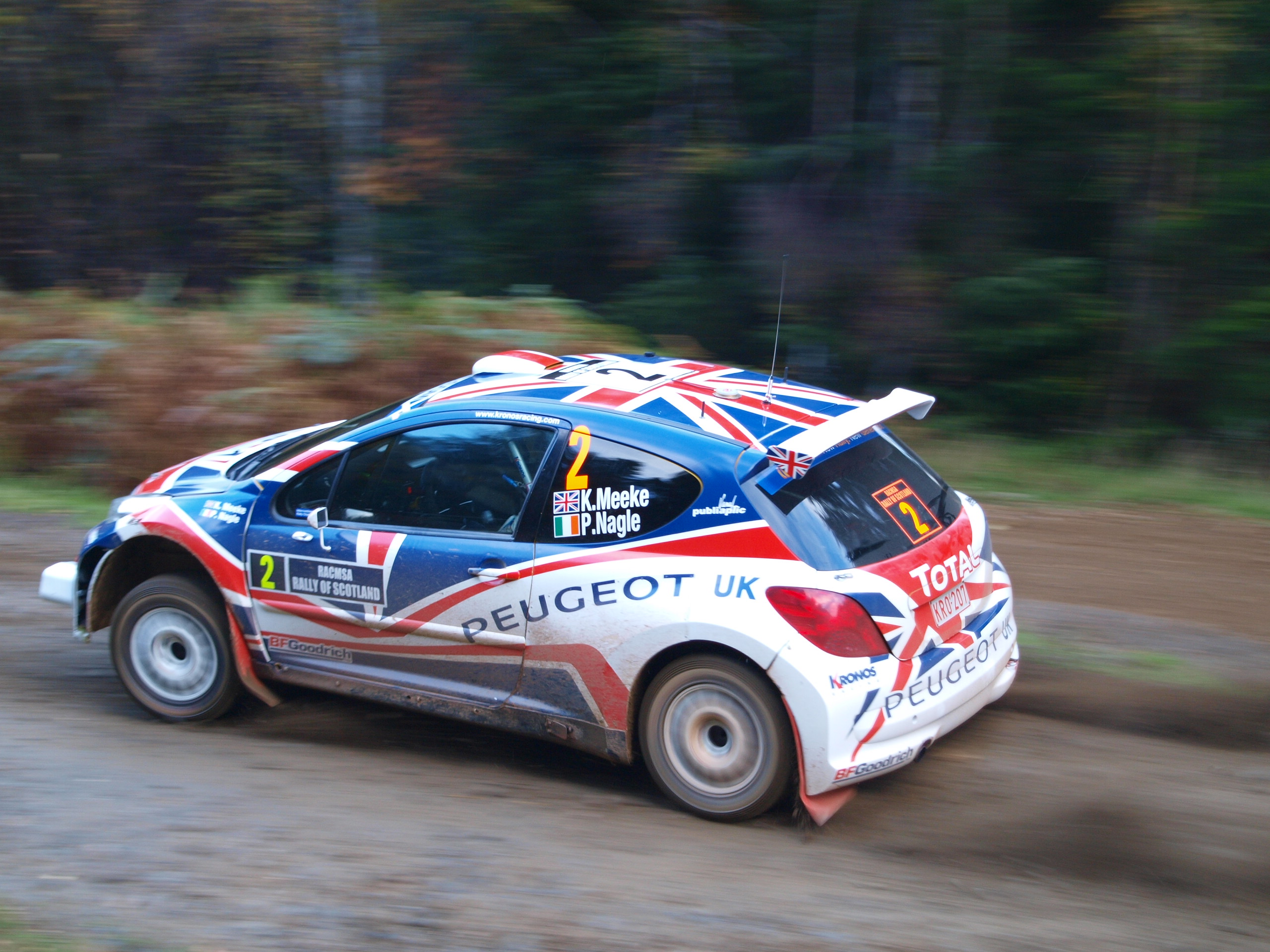
Kris Meeke in the Peugeot 207 on SS4 of the 2010 Rally Scotland.

At a press conference in Glasgow on 15 October 2008 it was announced that Scotland would host the final round of the 2009 Intercontinental Rally Challenge and that Rally Scotland had secured a three-year contract with the IRC to host the event. Among those present at the launch was the First Minister of Scotland Alex Salmond, the ex-world champion Robert Reid and Andrew Cowan founder of Mitsubishi Ralliart.

The inaugural event was held between 19 and 21 November 2009 during some of the wettest weather seen in the UK. The event was won by Guy Wilks in a Škoda Fabia S2000.

For 2010, the rally took place at the earlier dates of 15–17 October with the main service area being moved from Blair Atholl Castle to Perth Airport. Juho Hänninen won the event and also sealed victory in the IRC championship. Eurosport again covered the event live.

In 2011, the rally had a new date after the initial slot of 14–16 October was moved a week earlier to 7–9 October. The change was due to a request to ensure that sufficient numbers of volunteers are available to running of the event.

=== 2027–present: New WRC event in Aberdeen ===
The rally is set to join the World Rally Championship calendar in 2027, marking UK's return to the championship since the 2019 Wales Rally GB. The rally would be held as a new event and is planned to be based in Aberdeen.

== Route and stages ==
The two-day event used rally stages in Perthshire (day one) and the Trossachs (day two) including some of the most famous stages used in the Scottish Rally Championship and the RAC Rally. They include three of Colin McRae's all time favourites; Craigvinean, Drummond Hill and Errochty and also Loch Ard which was described by Kris Meeke as the best stage in the world. Drummond Hill is also the all-time favourite of ex-rally star and M-Sport owner Malcolm Wilson.

== Results ==
Rally name	Stages	Podium finishers			
Rally name	Stages	Rank	Driver Co-driver	Team Car	Time
2011 Rally Scotland; 7–9 October 2011; Round 10 of the Intercontinental Rally Challenge	15 stages 196.96 km	1	(Norway) Andreas Mikkelsen (Norway) Ola Fløene	(United Kingdom) Škoda UK (Czech Republic) Škoda Fabia S2000	1 h : 55 m : 17.2 s
2011 Rally Scotland; 7–9 October 2011; Round 10 of the Intercontinental Rally Challenge	15 stages 196.96 km	2	(Finland) Juho Hänninen (Finland) Mikko Markkula	(Czech Republic) Škoda Motorsport (Czech Republic) Škoda Fabia S2000	1 h : 55 m : 43.6 s
2011 Rally Scotland; 7–9 October 2011; Round 10 of the Intercontinental Rally Challenge	15 stages 196.96 km	3	(France) Bryan Bouffier (France) Xavier Panseri	Peugeot France; Peugeot 207 S2000	1 h : 56 m : 52.5 s
2010 Rally Scotland; 15–17 October 2010; Round 11 of the Intercontinental Rally Challenge	12 stages 208.08 km	1	(Finland) Juho Hänninen (Finland) Mikko Markkula	(Czech Republic) Škoda Motorsport (Czech Republic) Škoda Fabia S2000	2 h : 01 m : 07.4 s
2010 Rally Scotland; 15–17 October 2010; Round 11 of the Intercontinental Rally Challenge	12 stages 208.08 km	2	(Norway) Andreas Mikkelsen (Norway) Ola Fløene	(United Kingdom) M-Sport Ltd. (United Kingdom) Ford Fiesta S2000	2 h : 01 m : 32.9 s
2010 Rally Scotland; 15–17 October 2010; Round 11 of the Intercontinental Rally Challenge	12 stages 208.08 km	3	(United Kingdom) Kris Meeke (Republic of Ireland) Paul Nagle	(United Kingdom) Peugeot UK (France) Peugeot 207 S2000	2 h : 04 m : 31.6 s
2009 Rally Scotland; 19–21 November 2009; Round 11 of the Intercontinental Rally Challenge	13 stages 204.50 km	1	(United Kingdom) Guy Wilks (United Kingdom) Phillip Pugh	(United Kingdom) Phillip Pugh (Czech Republic) Škoda Fabia S2000	2 h : 17 m : 07.5 s
2009 Rally Scotland; 19–21 November 2009; Round 11 of the Intercontinental Rally Challenge	13 stages 204.50 km	2	(United Kingdom) Alister McRae (Australia) Billy Hayes	(United Kingdom) Mellors Elliot Motorsport (Malaysia) Proton Satria Neo	2 h : 19 m : 54.8 s
2009 Rally Scotland; 19–21 November 2009; Round 11 of the Intercontinental Rally Challenge	13 stages 204.50 km	3	(United Kingdom) Jonathan Greer (United Kingdom) Dai Roberts	(United Kingdom) Jonathan Greer (Japan) Mitsubishi Lancer Evolution IX	2 h : 22 m : 29.3 s
