= Franz Wittmann Jr. =

Austrian rally driver (born 1983)

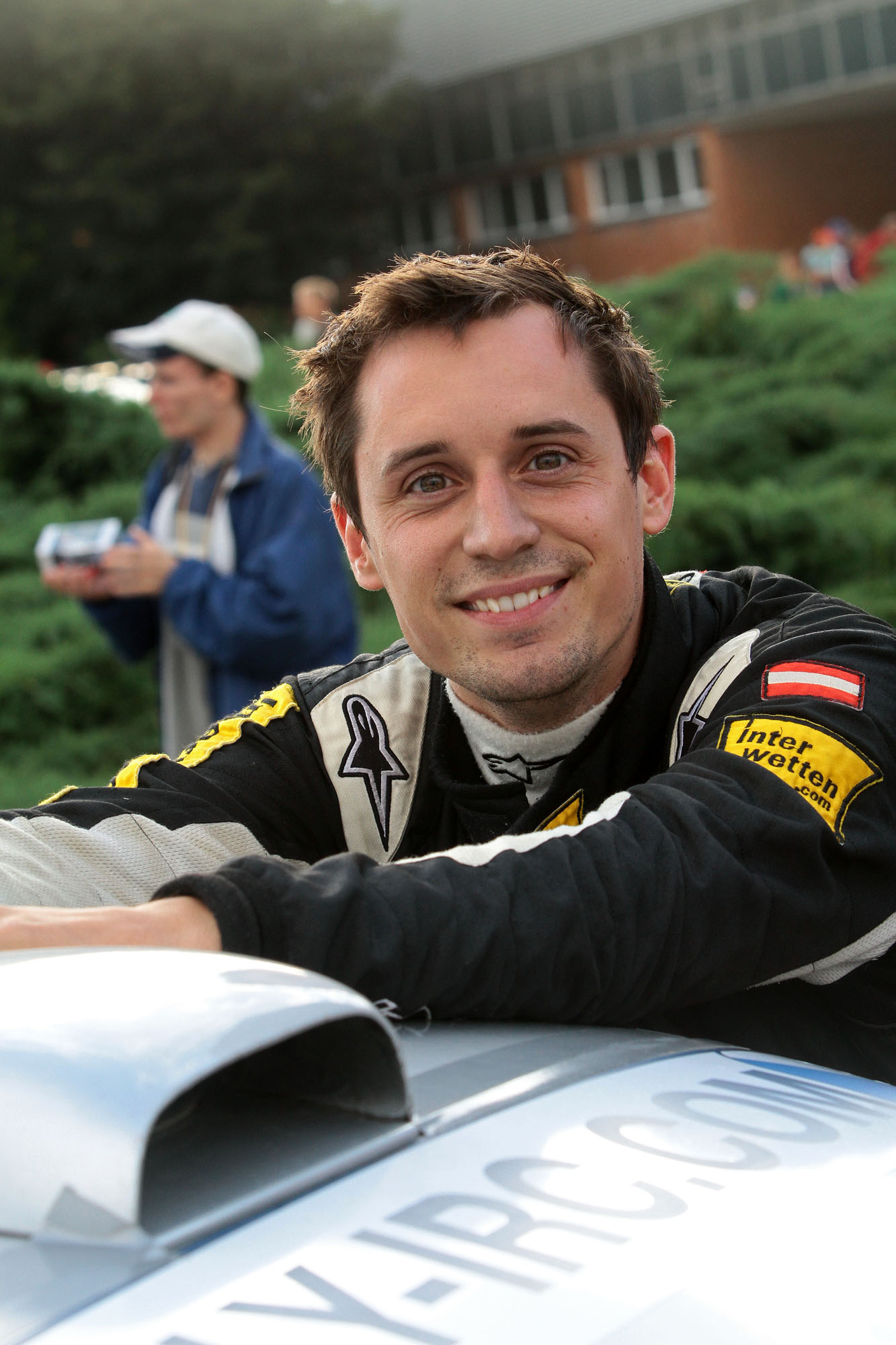
Franz Wittmann, Interwetten Racing, IRC Series, Barum Rallye 2010

Franz Wittmann (born October 27, 1983) is an Austrian rally driver. He was a regular competitor in the Intercontinental Rally Challenge, driving a Peugeot 207 S2000, for Interwetten Racing. Wittmann's father, also called Franz, was also a rally driver, who won the 1987 Rally New Zealand, a round of the World Rally Championship.
