= 2010 Ypres Rally =

Motor rally competition

2010 GEKO Ypres Rally
Round 6 of the 2010 Intercontinental Rally Challenge
← Previous event	Next event →
- Host country: Belgium
- Rally base: Ypres
- Dates run: June 24 – 26 2010
- Stages: 19 (293.62 km; 182.45 miles)
- Stage surface: Asphalt
- Overall distance: 651.30 km (404.70 miles)

Statistics
- Crews: 97 at start, 48 at finish

Overall results
- Overall winner: (Belgium) Freddy Loix (Belgium) Freddy Loix

The 2010 GEKO Ypres Rally was the 45th running of the Ypres Rally and the sixth round of the 2010 Intercontinental Rally Challenge (IRC). The event was held between 24–26 June 2010 and was based in the town of Ypres, Belgium.

== Introduction ==
The rally was held over two days with a total of 293.62 km (182.45 mi) covered in nineteen asphalt special stages. Friday had six stages with Saturday having a total of thirteen stages. In addition to IRC frontrunners Juho Hänninen, Jan Kopecký and Kris Meeke, other entries in S2000 cars included Freddy Loix (Škoda Fabia S2000) and factory Proton pair, Chris Atkinson and Alister McRae.

== Results ==
The event was dominated by local driver Freddy Loix after two of the main title contenders crashed out of the rally; Juho Hänninen on stage four and Kris Meeke on stage eight. In addition to these retirements both Proton's failed to finish due to engine problems related to valve spring failures. The win was the fifth different winner of an IRC round this season, the fourth for Škoda and its first with the facelift Fabia.

The Ypres Historic Rally normally runs at the same time as the main event. In 2010, the winner was Robert Droogmans, a Belgian racing driver competing with Marc Duez.

=== Overall standings ===
Pos.	Driver	Co-driver	Car	Time	Difference	Points
1.	(Belgium) Freddy Loix	(Belgium) Fréderic Miclotte	Škoda Fabia S2000	2:35:36.9	0.0	10
2.	(Czech Republic) Jan Kopecký	(Czech Republic) Petr Starý	Škoda Fabia S2000	2:35:58.3	21.4	8
3.	(Belgium) Thierry Neuville	(France) Nicolas Klinger	Peugeot 207 S2000	2:37:42.4	2:05.5	6
4.	(Belgium) Bernd Casier	(Belgium) Francis Caesemaeker	Škoda Fabia S2000	2:39:38.5	4:01.6	5
5.	(Norway) Andreas Mikkelsen	(Norway) Ola Fløene	Ford Fiesta S2000	2:40:57.8	5:20.9	4
6.	(Portugal) Bruno Magalhães	(Portugal) Carlos Magalhães	Peugeot 207 S2000	2:41:43.1	6:06.2	3
7.	(Poland) Michał Sołowow	(Poland) Maciej Baran	Ford Fiesta S2000	2:43:01.4	7:24.5	2
8.	(Italy) Luca Betti	(Italy) Pierangelo Scalvini	Peugeot 207 S2000	2:45:14.5	9:37.6	1

=== Special stages ===
Day	Stage	Time	Name	Length	Winner	Time	Avg. spd.	Rally leader
1 (25 June)	SS1	16:29	Hollebeke 1	28.82 km	(United Kingdom) Kris Meeke	15:49.4	109.28 km/h	(United Kingdom) Kris Meeke
1 (25 June)	SS2	17:20	Westouter 1	6.04 km	(Belgium) Freddy Loix	3:34.3	101.47 km/h	(United Kingdom) Kris Meeke
1 (25 June)	SS3	18:00	Mesen – Sauvegarde 1	14.80 km	(Belgium) Freddy Loix	7:58.2	111.42 km/h	(Belgium) Freddy Loix
1 (25 June)	SS4	20:06	Hollebeke 2	28.82 km	(Belgium) Freddy Loix	15:40.4	110.33 km/h	(Belgium) Freddy Loix
1 (25 June)	SS5	20:57	Westouter 2	6.04 km	(United Kingdom) Kris Meeke	3:31.8	102.66 km/h	(Belgium) Freddy Loix
1 (25 June)	SS6	21:37	Mesen – Sauvegarde 2	14.80 km	(Belgium) Freddy Loix	7:56.3	111.86 km/h	(Belgium) Freddy Loix
2 (26 June)	SS7	11:13	Proven-Vleteren 1	14.80 km	(United Kingdom) Kris Meeke	7:21.9	120.57 km/h	(Belgium) Freddy Loix
2 (26 June)	SS8	11:31	Watou 1	12.33 km	(Belgium) Freddy Loix	6:40.3	110.89 km/h	(Belgium) Freddy Loix
2 (26 June)	SS9	12:12	Kemmelberg 1	9.06 km	(Belgium) Freddy Loix	4:55.6	110.34 km/h	(Belgium) Freddy Loix
2 (26 June)	SS10	13:41	Langemark 1	18.84 km	(Czech Republic) Jan Kopecký	9:48.4	115.27 km/h	(Belgium) Freddy Loix
2 (26 June)	SS11	14:16	Dikkebus 1	11.32 km	(Czech Republic) Jan Kopecký	6:03.6	112.08 km/h	(Belgium) Freddy Loix
2 (26 June)	SS12	14:43	Heuvelland 1	28.80 km	(Czech Republic) Jan Kopecký	14:59.7	115.24 km/h	(Belgium) Freddy Loix
2 (26 June)	SS13	15:56	Lille-Eurométropole	1.66 km	(Czech Republic) Jan Kopecký	1:17.5	77.11 km/h	(Belgium) Freddy Loix
2 (26 June)	SS14	18:13	Proven-Vleteren 2	14.80 km	(Czech Republic) Jan Kopecký	7:21.7	120.62 km/h	(Belgium) Freddy Loix
2 (26 June)	SS15	18:31	Watou 2	12.33 km	(Belgium) Freddy Loix	6:40.1	110.94 km/h	(Belgium) Freddy Loix
2 (26 June)	SS16	19:12	Kemmelberg 2	9.06 km	(Belgium) Freddy Loix	4:53.7	111.05 km/h	(Belgium) Freddy Loix
2 (26 June)	SS17	20:41	Langemark 2	18.84 km	(Belgium) Freddy Loix	9:47.5	115.45 km/h	(Belgium) Freddy Loix
2 (26 June)	SS18	21:16	Dikkebus 2	11.32 km	(Czech Republic) Jan Kopecký	6:03.2	112.20 km/h	(Belgium) Freddy Loix
2 (26 June)	SS19	21:43	Heuvelland 2	28.80 km	(Czech Republic) Jan Kopecký	14:54.7	115.88 km/h	(Belgium) Freddy Loix
