= List of European Rally Championship drivers =

This is a list of drivers to have competed in the FIA European Rally Championship since 1953 and between 2007 and 2011, the period when drivers had to register for the championship until it merged with the Intercontinental Rally Challenge.

Drivers in bold have competed in this year's season, the 2018 season.

== All ERC drivers ==
Driver	First season	Final season	ERC rallies	ERC wins	Championships
(Norway) Erik Aaby	1973	1990	6	-	-
(Estonia) Urmo Aava	2001	2006	3	1	-
(Finland) Rauno Aaltonen	1959	1982	55	9	-
(Italy) Carlo Maria Abate	1957	1959	3	-	-
(Netherlands) Edwin Abbring	1992	2002	11	-	-
(Netherlands) Kevin Abbring	2014	2015	8	-	-
(Estonia) Markus Abram	2014	2014	1	-	-
(Italy) Umberto Accornero	2016	2016	1	-	-
(Italy) Guido Acerbis	1995	2003	25	-	-
(United Kingdom) Ronnie Adams	1953	1959	8	1	-
(Sweden) Mattias Adielsson	2015	2016	7	-	-
(Czech Republic) Robert Adolf	2012	2017	5	-	-
(Switzerland) Gilles Aebi	1998	1999	3	-	-
(Italy) Andrea Aghini	1987	2008	71	12	-
(France) Anthony Agostini	2013	2013	1	-	-
(Sweden) **Fredrik Åhlin**	2016	**Active**	4	-	-
(Austria) Andreas Aigner	2012	2014	10	-	-
(Austria) Gerhard Aigner	2012	2013	2	-	-
(Finland) Pentti Airikkala	1968	1989	57	5	-
(United Kingdom) Louise Aitken-Walker	1980	1996	33	-	-
(Qatar) **Nasser Al-Attiyah**	2017	**Active**	3	-	-
(Qatar) Saeed Al-Hajri	1983	1990	8	-	-
(Qatar) Abdulaziz Al-Kuwari	2012	2012	3	-	-
(Qatar) Abdullah Al-Kuwari	2016	2016	1	-	-
(Qatar) Rashid Al-Naimi	2016	2016	1	-	-
(Saudi Arabia) Yazeed Al-Rajhi	2014	2014	1	1	-
(Saudi Arabia) Rakan Al-Rashed	2017	2017	1	-	-
(Qatar) Khalid Mohammad Al-Suwaidi	2016	2016	1	-	-
(Italy) Stefano Albertini	2011	2013	4	-	-
(Finland) Anton Alén	2008	2008	3	-	-
(Finland) Markku Alén	1970	2002	33	6	-
(Italy) Paolo Alessandrini	1984	1996	20	-	-
(United Kingdom) Alan Allard	1963	1969	6	-	-
(United Kingdom) Sydney Allard	1953	1965	7	-	-
(Portugal) **Pedro Almeida**	2018	**Active**	1	-	-
(France) Jacques Alméras	1971	1982	11	-	-
(Spain) Flavio Alonso	1992	2002	11	-	-
(Argentina) **Juan Carlos Alonso**	2016	**Active**	8	-	-
(Switzerland) Nicolas Althaus	1995	2013	9	-	-
(Portugal) **Joaquim Alves**	2015	**Active**	4	-	-
(Russia) Sergey Alyasov	1986	1997	24	-	-
(Portugal) Inverno Amaral	1977	1995	25	2	-
(Germany) Ronny Amm	2000	2003	5	-	-
(Finland) Jouni Ampuja	1998	2003	7	-	-
(France) Jérémi Ancian	2013	2013	6	-	-
(Sweden) Gunnar Andersson	1956	1964	38	4	2 (1958, 1963)
(Sweden) Ove Andersson	1963	1977	32	2	-
(Sweden) Per-Gunnar Andersson	2000	2003	8	-	-
(Sweden) Stig Andervang	1982	1986	20	-	-
(Italy) Fabio Andolfi	2013	2014	7	-	-
(Italy) Fabrizio Andolfi Jr.	2012	2017	4	-	-
(Italy) **Paolo Andreucci**	1988	**Active**	81	10	-
(France) Jean-Claude Andruet	1966	1984	58	17	1 (1970)
(Bulgaria) Miroslav Angelov	2013	2013	1	-	-
(Portugal) **Gil Antunes**	2014	**Active**	5	-	-
(Portugal) **Pedro Antunes**	2017	**Active**	2	-	-
(Spain) Gorka Antxustegi	2009	2013	4	-	-
(Bulgaria) Stoyan Apostolov	1980	2006	54	-	-
(United Kingdom) Ian Appleyard	1953	1956	7	1	-
(Japan) Toshihiro Arai	2000	2013	6	1	-
(Portugal) Armindo Araújo	2001	2006	12	-	-
(Czech Republic) Václav Arazim	1982	2006	54	-	-
(Luxembourg) Charel Arendt	2014	2014	1	-	-
(Luxembourg) Hugo Arellano	2013	2013	2	-	-
(Spain) **Iván Ares**	2016	**Active**	3	-	-
(Italy) Fabio Arletti	1985	1991	31	1	-
(United Kingdom) Jock Armstrong	1995	1996	7	-	-
(United Kingdom) Jon Armstrong	2015	2015	3	-	-
(Norway) Bruno Arntsen	1988	2001	22	1	-
(Russia) Yuriy Arshanskiy	2014	2015	2	-	-
(France) Mathieu Arzeno	2012	2012	1	-	-
(Lebanon) Rodolphe Asmar	2016	2016	1	-	-
(East Germany) Eberhard Asmus	1960	1975	38	-	-
(France) **Raphaël Astier**	2018	**Active**	1	-	-
(Turkey) Iskender Atakan	1987	1994	13	3	-
(Greece) Lambros Athanassoulas	2002	2016	7	-	-
(Romania) Constantin Aur	1995	2002	11	3	-
(France) Didier Auriol	1983	1992	26	6	-
(Estonia) Rainer Aus	2014	2016	3	-	-
(Turkey) Nejat Avci	1990	2003	43	-	-
(Turkey) Yagiz Avci	2003	2013	5	-	-
(Turkey) **Orhan Avcioglu**	2012	**Active**	9	-	-
(Poland) **Marcin Babraj**	2018	**Active**	1	-	-
(Italy) Fulvio Bacchelli	1974	1982	15	2	-
(United Kingdom) David Bagshaw	2001	2001	1	-	-
(Saudi Arabia) Abdullah Bakhashab	2001	2001	1	-	-
(San Marino) Mirco Baldacci	2001	2005	5	-	-
(United Kingdom) Stanley Ballantine	1985	2016	7	-	-
(Czech Republic) **Zbyněk Baller**	2012	**Active**	4	-	-
(Italy) Valter Ballestrero	1995	2003	25	-	-
(United Kingdom) Keith Ballisat	1958	1961	6	-	-
(France) Claude Ballot-Léna	1970	1974	8	-	-
(Turkey) Bugra Banaz	2012	2017	11	-	-
(Lebanon) **Gilbert Bannout**	2016	**Active**	3	-	-
(Romania) Sebastian Barbu	2013	2013	3	-	-
(Czech Republic) **Andrej Barčák ml.**	2016	**Active**	3	-	-
(France) Pierre-César Baroni	1979	2002	69	8	1 (1993)
(Republic of Ireland) Robert Barrable	2012	2015	5	-	-
(Germany) Jürgen Barth	1980	1980	1	-	-
(Spain) Josep Bassas	1983	1990	25	2	-
(Italy) **Giandomenico Basso**	2001	**Active**	48	18	2 (2006, 2009)
(Belgium) Johan Bastiaens	1988	2005	41	-	-
(Italy) Luigi Battistolli	1974	1994	45	2	-
(Austria) Raimund Baumschlager	1986	2014	46	5	-
(Republic of Ireland) Calvin Beattie	2014	2015	2	-	-
(Poland) Michał Bębenek	1998	2013	20	1	-
(Belgium) René Bebronne	1994	2003	8	-	-
(Germany) Jan Becker	1997	2003	15	-	-
(Belgium) Sébastien Bedoret	2016	2017	4	-	-
(France) Bernard Béguin	1975	1994	89	19	-
(Czech Republic) Daniel Běhálek	2002	2012	7	-	-
(Latvia) Daņila Belokoņs	2015	2015	2	-	-
(France) Jean-Pierre Beltoise	1967	1970	2	1	-
(France) Alexandre Bengué	1999	2001	3	-	-
(Hungary) Balázs Benik	2001	2003	6	-	-
(France) Claude Bensimon	2013	2014	2	-	-
(Italy) Bruno Bentivogli	1978	2002	79	-	-
(Hungary) **Norbert Bereczki**	2018	**Active**	1	-	-
(Slovakia) Jozef Béreš jun.	2002	2006	10	-	-
(Czech Republic) Vladimír Berger	1984	2004	42	-	-
(Sweden) Emil Bergkvist	2015	2015	7	-	-
(Latvia) **Jānis Berķis**	2017	**Active**	2	-	-
(France) **Florian Bernardi**	2018	**Active**	2	-	-
(Italy) Lorenzo Bertelli	2013	2013	1	-	-
(Italy) Enrico Bertone	1986	2002	66	11	2 (1995, 1999)
(United Kingdom) Leo Bertorelli	1966	1971	4	-	-
(Hungary) Zoltán Bessenyey	2013	2016	16	-	-
(Italy) Attilio Bettega	1973	1985	17	3	-
(Italy) Luca Betti	2001	2012	49	3	-
(Belgium) Lucien Bianchi	1961	1968	14	1	-
(France) Mathieu Biaison	2000	2013	6	-	-
(Italy) Miki Biasion	1980	1985	29	11	1 (1983)
(Portugal) Carlos Bica	1982	1991	25	-	-
(Netherlands) Peter Bijvelds	1998	2006	20	-	-
(United Arab Emirates) Mohammed Bin Sulayem	1984	1992	8	-	-
(United Kingdom) Gerry Birrell	1966	1969	2	-	-
(Czech Republic) Ondřej Bisaha	2012	2017	10	-	-
(Spain) **Roberto Blach Jr.**	2016	**Active**	3	-	-
(Czech Republic) Václav Blahna	1972	1997	62	3	-
(United Kingdom) Mark Blair	1995	1995	3	-	-
(Italy) Marco Blanc	2001	2014	3	-	-
(Switzerland) Alain Blaser	1999	2013	4	-	-
(United Kingdom) Ashley Blenkhorn	1995	1996	6	-	-
(Sweden) Stig Blomqvist	1965	2013	72	14	-
(Latvia) Emils Blūms	2013	2015	3	-	-
(United Kingdom) David Bogie	2016	2016	1	-	-
(France) **Yoann Bonato**	2005	**Active**	17	2	-
(France) Francis Bondil	1975	1984	17	-	-
(France) Germain Bonnefis	2013	2013	5	-	-
(Republic of Ireland) Vincent Bonner	1976	1986	9	-	-
(Austria) **Michael Böhm**	1998	**Active**	6	-	-
(Germany) Eugen Böhringer	1960	1965	29	3	1 (1962)
(Republic of Ireland) Eamonn Boland	1994	2003	5	-	-
(Netherlands) Evert Bolderheij	1998	2003	12	-	-
(Brazil) Sady Bordin	1986	1987	4	-	-
(France) Pierre Bos	1977	1995	12	1	-
(Netherlands) John Bosch	1985	1993	47	-	-
(France) Petru-Antone Boschetti	2013	2013	1	-	-
(Italy) Elia Bossalini	2011	2012	3	-	-
(Turkey) Murat Bostanci	2016	2017	14	-	-
(Hungary) **Dávid Botka**	2003	**Active**	29	-	-
(Italy) Luca Bottarelli	2017	2017	1	-	-
(Belgium) Xavier Bouche	1990	2005	38	-	-
(France) Bryan Bouffier	2000	2017	28	3	-
(Belgium) Achiel Boxoen	2016	2016	2	-	-
(Belgium) Joost Boxoen	1995	2003	23	-	-
(Republic of Ireland) Adrian Boyd	1970	1975	7	1	-
(Republic of Ireland) Craig Breen	2013	2016	27	5	-
(Netherlands) Mark Breijer	1996	2002	20	1	-
(Czech Republic) **Martin Březík**	1998	**Active**	10	-	-
(Sweden) Hans Britth	1969	1993	51	-	-
(San Marino) Alessandro Broccoli	2001	2003	10	-	-
(Belgium) Renaud Bronkart	2012	2016	9	-	-
(United Kingdom) Leslie Brooke	1965	1966	3	-	-
(United Kingdom) Russell Brookes	1969	1991	70	9	-
(United Kingdom) Blair Anderson Brown	2016	2016	1	-	-
(United Kingdom) **Jamie Brown**	2013	**Active**	2	-	-
(Czech Republic) **Dominik Brož**	2015	**Active**	17	-	-
(Soviet Union) Stasys Brundza	1971	1989	18	-	-
(Belgium) Dominique Bruyneel	1988	2012	60	-	-
(Norway) **Eyvind Brynildsen**	2018	**Active**	3	-	-
(Poland) Marian Bublewicz	1975	1992	46	-	-
(United Kingdom) Dominic Buckley	1991	1995	5	-	-
(Republic of Ireland) Ger Buckley	1976	1982	12	1	-
(Belgium) Vital Budo	1981	1992	53	-	-
(United States) John Buffum	1978	1984	13	2	-
(France) Philippe Bugalski	1984	2001	52	10	-
(Netherlands) Kees Burger	2014	2014	1	-	-
(United Kingdom) Gerry Burgess	1955	1959	3	1	-
(Germany) Aaron Burkart	2002	2009	4	-	-
(Germany) Nikolai Burkart	1993	1997	24	-	-
(Germany) Josef Burkhard	1988	1995	21	-	-
(Russia) Grigoriy Burlichkiy	2015	2015	1	-	-
(United Kingdom) Richard Burns	1991	1995	6	2	-
(Switzerland) Olivier Burri	1984	2015	25	8	-
(United Kingdom) Adam Bustard	2016	2016	1	-	-
(Lithuania) Dominykas Butvilas	2013	2015	7	-	-
(Belgium) Gino Bux	2014	2015	3	-	-
(Poland) Łukasz Byśkiniewicz	2012	2017	4	-	-
(Italy) Giulio Cabianca	1957	1961	2	-	-
(Czech Republic) **Erik Cais**	2018	**Active**	1	-	-
(Italy) Nicola Caldani	1993	2006	17	1	-
(Portugal) Victor Calisto	1985	2006	51	-	-
(France) Eric Camilli	2014	2014	1	-	-
(Italy) **Simone Campedelli**	2012	**Active**	3	-	-
(Portugal) Miguel Campos	1996	2006	33	5	-
(Spain) Salvador Cañellas	1972	1978	24	1	-
(Spain) Salvador Cañellas Jr.	1995	2001	8	2	-
(Italy) Vittorio Caneva	1982	1988	11	-	-
(France) Olivier Capanaccia	2014	2014	1	-	-
(Italy) Carlo Capone	1980	1984	23	6	1 (1984)
(Switzerland) Gérard Capré	1984	2000	37	-	-
(Italy) Antonio Carello	1972	1982	15	8	1 (1978)
(Sweden) Daniel Carlsson	2001	2002	2	-	-
(Sweden) Erik Carlsson	1956	1967	56	9	-
(Sweden) Ingvar Carlsson	1972	1994	25	1	-
(Switzerland) Sébastien Carron	2001	2015	6	-	-
(France) Fabian Cartery	2013	2013	1	-	-
(Belgium) Wim Carton	2013	2016	4	-	-
(Portugal) Carlos Carvalho	1982	1994	13	1	-
(France) Mathieu Casalonga	2014	2014	1	-	-
(Belgium) Bernd Casier	2001	2016	16	-	-
(Belgium) Nigel Casier	2013	2014	2	-	-
(Portugal) **Manuel Castro**	2016	**Active**	3	-	-
(Spain) **Juan Pablo Castro**	1998	**Active**	4	-	-
(Italy) Davide Catania	2001	2013	6	-	-
(Latvia) Ivars Caune	2001	2003	3	-	-
(United Kingdom) Tom Cave	2016	2016	1	-	-
(Italy) Marco Cavigioli	1993	2017	54	-	-
(Italy) Leo Cella	1965	1968	13	2	-
(Czech Republic) **Jan Černý**	2009	**Active**	35	-	-
(Italy) Dario Cerrato	1977	1993	79	25	2 (1985, 1987)
(France) Mark Champeau	1996	1998	7	-	-
(France) Sébastien Chardonnet	2014	2014	1	-	-
(France) François Chatriot	1977	1996	48	16	-
(Italy) Elwis Chentre	2006	2014	10	-	-
(Belgium) **Cédric Cherain**	2003	2015	5	-	-
(France) Guerlain Chicherit	2004	2004	1	-	-
(Cyprus) **Antonis Chilimindris**	2018	**Active**	1	-	-
(Monaco) Louis Chiron	1953	1954	2	1	-
(Czech Republic) Petr Chodura sen.	2012	2013	2	-	-
(Czech Republic) Stanislav Chovanec	1986	2003	44	4	-
(Bulgaria) Ilia Chubrikov	1968	1986	59	4	-
(Poland) Wojciech Chuchała	2012	2016	9	-	-
(Czech Republic) Milan Chvojka	1991	2006	45	-	-
(Poland) Piotr Cierzniewski	2016	2016	1	-	-
(Italy) Marco Ciufoli	2017	2017	1	-	-
(Belgium) Johnny Claes	1953	1955	2	1	-
(United Kingdom) Barry Clark	2003	2003	1	-	-
(United Kingdom) Gawaine Clark	1995	2000	7	-	-
(United Kingdom) Jim Clark	1965	1966	2	-	-
(United Kingdom) Roger Clark	1963	1995	54	9	-
(Spain) Luis Climent	1987	2000	27	5	-
(Republic of Ireland) Billy Coleman	1971	1987	48	5	-
(United Kingdom) Ben Coles	1992	1996	5	-	-
(Belgium) Jean-Marie Cols	1970	1982	31	-	-
(Belgium) Larry Cols	1996	2006	49	2	-
(Belgium) Bob Colsoul	1999	2012	21	-	-
(Belgium) Guy Colsoul	1975	1996	95	4	-
(Italy) Claudio Conforto Galli	2016	2016	1	-	-
(France) Robert Consani	2012	2017	30	-	-
(France) Stéphane Consani	2017	2017	1	-	-
(Australia) Adrian Coppin	2013	2013	1	-	-
(Germany) Peter Corazza	2000	2003	7	-	-
(Romania) Andrei Coreanu	2015	2015	1	-	-
(Italy) Michele Coriglie	2017	2017	1	-	-
(United Kingdom) Josh Cornwell	2016	2016	1	-	-
(Portugal) **Miguel Correia**	2018	**Active**	1	-	-
(Italy) Giacomo Costenaro	2014	2016	7	-	-
(France) Jean-Sébastien Couloumiès	1972	1984	15	-	-
(United Kingdom) Stuart Coupe	1989	2001	43	-	-
(United Kingdom) Andrew Cowan	1965	1983	21	-	-
(United Kingdom) Gavin Cox	1992	1996	4	-	-
(Belgium) Pieter Jan Michiel Cracco	2013	2014	2	-	-
(United Kingdom) Martin Craik	1992	1996	3	-	-
(Belgium) David Croes	1996	2013	18	-	-
(Republic of Ireland) Keith Cronin	2014	2016	2	-	-
(Italy) Andrea Crugnola	2013	2014	8	-	-
(Hungary) **Miklós Csomós**	2018	**Active**	1	-	-
(France) Alain Cudini	1979	1986	5	-	-
(United Kingdom) Brian Culcheth	1963	1979	25	1	-
(Republic of Ireland) Brendan Cumiskey	2003	2015	2	-	-
(Italy) Franco Cunico	1979	2006	106	21	-
(United Kingdom) Cahal Curley	1973	1979	7	1	-
(United Kingdom) Dick Curran	2001	2003	3	-	-
(Poland) Tomasz Czopik	1997	2008	33	-	-
(United Kingdom) Justin Dale	1995	2003	8	-	-
(Italy) Andrea Dallavilla	1990	2011	66	10	-
(Norway) Rune Dalsjø	2000	2003	5	-	-
(South Africa) Serge Damseaux	1990	1991	2	-	-
(Austria) Hannes Danzinger	2000	2013	11	-	-
(France) Bernard Darniche	1970	1987	58	23	2 (1976, 1977)
(Italy) Andrea de Adamich	1964	1965	3	1	-
(Spain) Jorge de Bagration	1967	1981	20	6	-
(Italy) Claudio De Cecco	1988	2003	39	3	-
(Belgium) Alain de Changy	1956	1957	2	-	-
(Netherlands) Bert de Jong	1992	2000	32	4	-
(Belgium) Grégoire De Mévius	1984	2001	59	5	-
(France) Dominique De Meyer	1970	2004	55	-	-
(Netherlands) Jan de Winkel	1996	2013	36	-	-
(Italy) Piergiorgio Deila	1986	2003	23	-	-
(Italy) Giovanni del Zoppo	1979	2002	29	-	-
(France) François Delecour	1986	2013	42	3	-
(Switzerland) Federico Della Casa	2013	2016	5	-	-
(Switzerland) Lorenzo Della Casa	2015	2015	2	-	-
(Belgium) Fredericq Delplace	1990	2016	21	-	-
(Belgium) Jacky Delvaux	1980	2003	40	-	-
(Germany) Harald Demuth	1972	1994	78	11	-
(Cyprus) Christos Demosthenous	2014	2017	4	-	-
(Germany) Dieter Depping	1991	2002	41	11	-
(Belgium) Patrick Deroo	2000	2014	3	-	-
(Belgium) Julie Devalet	2013	2014	2	-	-
(Turkey) Ali Deveci	1992	2002	10	1	-
(Republic of Ireland) Callum Devine	2015	2016	3	-	-
(Spain) Pedro Javier Diego	1989	1999	11	1	-
(Turkey) Hakan Dinç	1992	2006	16	-	-
(Germany) Andreas Dingert	2001	2001	2	-	-
(Germany) Olaf Dobberkau	1993	2003	28	-	-
(Croatia) Nikola Dobrila	2013	2013	1	-	-
(Netherlands) Erwin Doctor	1987	1999	32	4	-
(France) Fabien Doenlen	1985	2001	21	-	-
(Czech Republic) **René Dohnal**	2012	**Active**	4	-	-
(France) José Dolhem	1971	1971	1	-	-
(Poland) Aron Domżała	2012	2015	4	-	-
(Bulgaria) Krum Donchev	2000	2012	52	6	-
(United Kingdom) Pat Doran	1988	1989	3	-	-
(Poland) Waldemar Doskocz	1988	1999	17	-	-
(Austria) Johann Drapela	1992	2012	9	-	-
(Greece) **Vassilis Drimousis**	2005	**Active**	3	-	-
(Belgium) Robert Droogmans	1976	1993	90	26	1 (1990)
(Slovakia) Igor Drotár	1982	2000	18	1	-
(France) Jean-Philippe Du Fayet De La Tour	2003	2003	1	-	-
(France) Daniel Ducruet	1993	1994	3	-	-
(Belgium) Marc Duez	1978	2015	72	9	-
(Switzerland) Yves Dulex	2003	2003	1	-	-
(France) Romain Dumas	2014	2017	4	-	-
(Belgium) Jean-Louis Dumont	1976	1985	35	1	-
(Belgium) Pierre Dumoulin	1980	1998	45	-	-
(Belgium) François Duval	1999	2002	13	-	-
(Germany) Willi Düvel	1980	1994	36	-	-
(Lithuania) Laurinas Diržininkas	2014	2015	3	-	-
(United Kingdom) Matt Edwards	2016	2016	1	-	-
(Latvia) Aivis Egle	2001	2013	4	-	-
(Sweden) Per Eklund	1967	1993	65	4	-
(United Kingdom) Vic Elford	1962	1983	32	4	1 (1967 G3)
(Republic of Ireland) Patrick Elliott	2001	2001	2	-	-
(Norway) Stian Engh	2000	2001	3	-	-
(Norway) Per Engseth	1975	1999	11	-	-
(France) Pascal Enjolras	1996	2001	5	-	-
(San Marino) Massimo Ercolani	1980	2000	37	3	-
(Hungary) **Tibor Érdi**	2014	**Active**	25	-	-
(Sweden) Mikael Ericsson	1981	1986	14	-	-
(Sweden) Kenneth Eriksson	1980	1989	14	1	-
(France) Luc Escharavil	2013	2013	1	-	-
(France) Jean Estager	1956	1959	3	1	-
(United Kingdom) Elfyn Evans	2016	2016	1	-	-
(Australia) Eli Evans	2014	2014	1	-	-
(United Kingdom) Gwyndaf Evans	1987	2003	22	-	-
(United Kingdom) Meirion Evans	2016	2016	1	-	-
(United Kingdom) Simon Everett	1978	1985	24	-	-
(Republic of Ireland) Kevin Eves	2015	2015	1	-	-
(Republic of Ireland) Brendan Fagan	1975	1983	8	-	-
(Spain) **Emma Falcón**	2013	**Active**	13	-	-
(United Kingdom) Tony Fall	1966	1976	24	2	-
(Italy) Antonio Fassina	1975	1984	46	8	1 (1982)
(Lebanon) Roger Feghali	2001	2016	2	-	-
(Latvia) Kristaps Feldmanis	2013	2014	3	-	-
(Hungary) Attila Ferjáncz	1966	1995	131	22	-
(Luxembourg) Steve Fernandes	2014	2014	1	-	-
(Spain) Benigno Fernández	1974	1989	54	2	-
(Italy) Maurizio Ferrecchi	1987	2002	10	1	-
(Peru) Ramón Ferreyros	1987	2002	25	-	-
(Poland) Mariusz Ficoń	1993	1999	12	-	-
(Greece) Nikos Filinis	1956	1960	5	-	-
(Romania) **Alexandru Filip**	2013	**Active**	3	-	-
(United Kingdom) Stephen Finlay	1994	1994	4	-	-
(Italy) Alex Fiorio	1986	2003	35	7	-
(Austria) Martin Fischerlehner	2013	2015	5	-	-
(Czech Republic) Miroslav Fišer	1998	2012	21	-	-
(United Kingdom) Bertie Fisher	1975	1996	40	2	-
(Sweden) Patrik Flodin	2008	2012	3	-	-
(Italy) Corrado Fontana	1997	2010	39	1	-
(Italy) Luigi Fontana	2001	2011	8	-	-
(Portugal) **José Pedro Fontes**	1998	**Active**	15	-	-
(Finland) Alex Forsström	2016	2016	2	-	-
(Germany) Helmut Fortkort	1978	1996	30	-	-
(France) Guy Fréquelin	1972	1988	28	6	-
(Germany) Klaus Fritzinger	1974	1990	43	-	-
(Poland) Cezary Fuchs	1992	2000	16	-	-
(Italy) Damiano Fumagalli	2005	2006	4	-	-
(Norway) **Sindre Furuseth**	2017	**Active**	4	-	-
(Italy) Vanni Fusaro	1978	1980	5	-	-
(Spain) Miguel Fuster	1991	2010	14	-	-
(Belgium) Pascal Gaban	1985	2005	49	-	-
(Poland) Zbigniew Gabryś	1999	2017	13	-	-
(Portugal) **Diogo Gago**	2013	**Active**	12	-	-
(Serbia) Živko Gajić	2013	2013	1	-	-
(Cyprus) **Simos Galatariotis**	1998	**Active**	6	1	-
(East Germany) Franz Galle	1960	1976	38	-	-
(Italy) Gigi Galli	1997	2003	32	-	-
(Italy) Matteo Gamba	2003	2012	14	-	-
(Spain) Enrique García Ojeda	1998	2013	16	2	-
(Finland) Toni Gardemeister	1997	2009	9	-	-
(Germany) Hermann Gassner	1984	2013	86	1	-
(Germany) Hermann Gassner Jr.	2012	2013	2	-	-
(Netherlands) Maurice Gatsonides	1953	1965	18	1	-
(Belgium) Olivier Gendebien	1954	1963	5	1	-
(Italy) Valter Gentilini	2012	2013	2	-	-
(Bulgaria) Georgi Geradzhiev	1999	2015	24	-	-
(Russia) Sergey Geraschenko	2014	2014	1	-	-
(India) **Amittrajit Ghosh**	2018	**Active**	1	-	-
(France) Quentin Gilbert	2012	2012	1	-	-
(Switzerland) Olivier Gillet	1994	2002	11	-	-
(United Kingdom) Alistair Ginley	2001	2001	1	-	-
(France) Quentin Giordano	2014	2014	1	-	-
(Romania) Dan Girtofan	1996	2013	8	1	-
(Austria) David Glachs	2012	2014	3	-	-
(Germany) Dieter Glemser	1963	1972	10	1	-
(Germany) Helm Glöckler	1954	1954	1	-	-
(Romania) Heinz Goellner	1998	2001	3	-	-
(Switzerland) Florian Gonon	2000	2015	10	-	-
(Spain) Marcos González Espino	2017	2017	2	-	-
(Italy) Diego Gonzo	1990	2012	5	-	-
(United Kingdom) Russell Gooding	1983	1985	11	-	-
(Ukraine) Valeriy Gorban	2003	2005	2	-	-
(Austria) Kurt Göttlicher	1976	1996	49	2	-
(Belgium) Gaby Goudezeune	1975	1999	45	1	-
(United Kingdom) Ron Gouldbourn	1958	1958	2	-	-
(United Kingdom) Kenneth Gouldsborough	1968	1969	2	-	-
(United Kingdom) Will Graham	2016	2016	1	-	-
(France) Henri Greder	1961	1973	27	3	-
(United Kingdom) Gus Greensmith	2015	2015	1	-	-
(United Kingdom) Barry Greer	2014	2015	2	-	-
(Republic of Ireland) Ian Greer	1994	2001	3	1	-
(United Kingdom) **Jonathan Greer**	2014	**Active**	2	-	-
(Germany) **Marijan Griebel**	2014	**Active**	21	-	-
(United Kingdom) Murray Grierson	1978	1996	6	-	-
(United Kingdom) Paul Griffiths	1991	2001	2	-	-
(Romania) George Grigorescu	1995	2013	10	1	-
(Austria) Werner Grissmann	1981	1985	5	-	-
(Norway) Anders Grøndal	2003	2003	1	-	-
(Finland) Marcus Grönholm	1989	2001	12	3	-
(Finland) Ulf Grönholm	1970	1981	16	2	-
(Sweden) Kalle Grundel	1977	1992	44	6	-
(Russia) **Nikolay Gryazin**	2015	**Active**	22	3	-
(Russia) **Vasiliy Gryazin**	2013	**Active**	9	-	-
(Poland) Robert Gryczynski	1987	2000	23	2	-
(Poland) **Grzegorz Grzyb**	1997	**Active**	35	-	-
(Mexico) Benito Guerra	2009	2009	1	-	-
(United Kingdom) Chris Guichot de Fortis	1991	2006	12	-	-
(United Kingdom) Callum Guy	1987	2000	4	-	-
(Bulgaria) Petar Gyoshev	2006	2012	6	-	-
(Poland) **Łukasz Habaj**	2005	**Active**	21	-	-
(Germany) Rudi Hachenberg	2003	2003	2	-	-
(Hungary) András Hadik	2000	2014	9	-	-
(Austria) Sepp Haider	1976	1999	88	10	-
(Germany) Reinhard Hainbach	1971	1985	23	4	-
(Austria) Klemens Haingartner	2012	2012	1	-	-
(Finland) Mika Häkkinen	2003	2003	1	-	-
(Switzerland) Claude Haldi	1967	1975	11	2	-
(Turkey) **Eytan Halfon**	2012	**Active**	2	-	-
(Greece) **Konstantinos Halivelakis**	2006	**Active**	2	-	-
(Greece) Efthimios Halkias	1997	2017	11	-	-
(Finland) Kyösti Hämäläinen	1970	1988	42	-	-
(Czech Republic) **Jiří Hanák**	2018	**Active**	1	-	-
(Finland) Juho Hänninen	2002	2012	8	4	1 (2012)
(Slovakia) **Vladimír Hanuš**	2015	**Active**	3	-	-
(Czech Republic) Petr Hapala	2004	2017	4	-	-
(Austria) Beppo Harrach	2001	2014	9	-	-
(United Kingdom) Cuth Harrison	1953	1959	7	-	-
(United Kingdom) Kevin Haselden	1982	1995	12	-	-
(Greece) Stratis Hatzipanayiotou	1983	1999	26	1	-
(Norway) John Haugland	1972	1996	51	2	-
(Luxembourg) Roger Heck	1996	2002	7	-	-
(Finland) Timo Heinonen	1984	1990	16	3	-
(Belgium) Guy Hendrickx	1976	1989	38	-	-
(Switzerland) Cyril Henny	1992	2000	12	3	-
(Poland) Robert Herba	1987	2002	27	1	-
(Hungary) **Norbert Herczig**	1997	**Active**	14	-	-
(Poland) Bogdan Herink	1986	1996	14	1	-
(Sweden) Jennie-Lee Hermansson	2002	2003	5	-	-
(Germany) Manfred Hero	1978	1989	36	2	-
(South Africa) Jan Hettema	1964	1983	5	-	-
(France) **Victorien Heuninck**	2013	**Active**	2	-	-
(Spain) Alberto Hevia	1996	2010	5	1	-
(Hungary) Krisztián Hideg	1995	2015	14	-	-
(United Kingdom) David Higgins	1992	2000	11	-	-
(United Kingdom) Mark Higgins	1991	2014	26	1	-
(United Kingdom) Graham Hill	1962	1966	3	-	-
(Switzerland) Jonathan Hirschi	2012	2015	6	-	-
(Finland) Mikko Hirvonen	2001	2002	5	-	-
(Finland) **Miika Hokkanen**	2018	**Active**	6	-	-
(Germany) Isolde Holderied	1988	2001	39	1	-
(Poland) Krzysztof Hołowczyc	1987	2013	43	10	1 (1997)
(Germany) Armin Holz	1987	2014	35	-	-
(Germany) Ronald Holzer	1982	1992	37	6	-
(Germany) Thomas Hölzlhammer	2001	2003	5	-	-
(East Germany) Peter Hommel	1969	1973	19	1	-
(Germany) Ruprecht Hopfen	1956	1965	7	1	1 (1957)
(United Kingdom) Paddy Hopkirk	1956	1970	41	5	-
(Sweden) Eddie Hörbing	2002	2003	3	1	-
(Czech Republic) **Robert Hordossy**	2017	**Active**	2	-	-
(Switzerland) Grégoire Hotz	1996	2013	11	1	-
(Czech Republic) Vladimír Hubáček	1964	1974	10	1	-
(Czech Republic) Martin Hudec	2012	2015	14	-	-
(United Kingdom) Simon Hughes	2001	2005	2	-	-
(France) Philippe Hugla	1979	2001	18	-	-
(Slovenia) Aleks Humar	1998	2016	8	-	-
(United Kingdom) Harry Hunt	2012	2012	2	-	-
(Switzerland) Urs Hunziker	2012	2014	3	-	-
(Finland) Jari Huttunen	2017	2017	6	-	-
(United Kingdom) **Chris Ingram**	2013	**Active**	31	-	-
(Bulgaria) Dimitar Iliev	1995	2012	60	10	-
(United Kingdom) Godfrey Imhof	1953	1955	4	-	-
(Finland) Risto Immonen	2013	2014	4	-	-
(Turkey) Volkan Isik	1994	2012	41	5	-
(Austria) Damian Izdebski	2012	2012	1	-	-
(France) Jean-Pierre Jabouille	1970	1971	2	-	-
(Paraguay) Jose Luis Jacquet Rios	2016	2016	1	-	-
(Czech Republic) **Miroslav Jakeš**	2013	**Active**	8	-	-
(Czech Republic) Miroslav Jandík	1996	2006	45	-	-
(Sweden) Tomas Jansson	1985	1999	19	-	-
(Switzerland) Christian Jaquillard	1983	2002	10	1	-
(United Kingdom) Tony Jardine	1994	2003	8	-	-
(France) Jean-Pierre Jarier	1985	1985	1	-	-
(Poland) Andrzej Jaroszewicz	1964	1979	34	2	-
(France) Simon Jean-Joseph	1991	2007	40	5	2 (2004, 2007)
(Estonia) Raul Jeets	2013	2016	16	-	-
(Slovenia) Tomaž Jemc	1992	2001	16	1	-
(Norway) Valter Christian Jensen	1972	2003	20	-	-
(Czech Republic) Martina Jerhotová-Daňhelová	2012	2015	5	-	-
(United Kingdom) Jonathan Joannides	1986	1997	26	-	-
(Sweden) Ingemar Johansson	1988	1999	18	-	-
(Sweden) **Sebastian Johansson**	2018	**Active**	1	-	-
(Sweden) Mats Jonsson	1979	2003	55	10	-
(France) Serge Jordan	1992	2001	23	2	-
(United Kingdom) **Tim Jones**	2006	**Active**	3	-	-
(Netherlands) Hein Jonkers	1999	2003	11	-	-
(United Kingdom) Peter Jopp	1959	1968	7	-	-
(Hungary) **Csaba Juhász**	2018	**Active**	1	-	-
(Poland) Jacek Jurecki	2013	2017	3	-	-
(Poland) Łukasz Kabaciński	2013	2015	9	-	-
(United Kingdom) Terry Kaby	1977	1990	39	1	-
(Germany) Matthias Kahle	1994	2003	31	13	-
(Poland) Kajetan Kajetanowicz	2005	2017	40	7	3 (2015, 2016, 2017)
(Israel) Koba Kakiashvili	1996	1997	6	-	-
(Sweden) Harry Kallström	1965	1979	24	4	1 (1969)
(Switzerland) Bryan Kaltenrieder	2012	2013	2	-	-
(Greece) **Haris Kaltsounis**	1983	**Active**	26	-	-
(Czech Republic) **Matěj Kamenec**	2017	**Active**	2	-	-
(Estonia) Martin Kangur	2012	2015	5	-	-
(Finland) Juha Kankkunen	1979	2001	13	3	-
(Greece) **Chrisostomos Karellis**	2017	**Active**	2	-	-
(Poland) Stefan Karnabal	2001	2008	12	-	-
(Poland) **Tomasz Kasperczyk**	2013	**Active**	14	-	-
(Finland) Kosti Katajamäki	2001	2002	5	-	-
(Estonia) Egon Kaur	2014	2016	3	-	-
(Japan) Suguru Kawana	2014	2015	4	-	-
(Turkey) Ercan Kazaz	1988	2012	31	3	-
(Republic of Ireland) Gus Kearney	2016	2016	1	-	-
(Republic of Ireland) Pat Kearney	1996	2016	3	-	-
(Austria) Johannes Keferböck	2012	2015	4	-	-
(Germany) Konstantin Keil	2003	2003	2	-	-
(Romania) Edwin Keleti	2013	2013	2	-	-
(France) Jean-Marc Kemp	2013	2014	2	-	-
(Poland) Mikołaj Kempa	2008	2016	2	-	-
(Switzerland) Loris Kessel	2002	2002	1	-	-
(Finland) Jari Ketomaa	2000	2013	4	1	-
(Finland) Leo Kinnunen	1965	1981	17	2	-
(Kenya) Mike Kirkland	1983	1984	2	-	-
(Latvia) Raimonds Kisiels	2013	2016	2	-	-
(Finland) Kari Kivenne	1988	2001	19	1	-
(Germany) Günther Klass	1966	1966	5	1	1 (1966 G3)
(Hungary) **Kristóf Klausz**	2013	**Active**	19	-	-
(Germany) Jutta Kleinschmidt	1997	1997	1	-	-
(Germany) Jochi Kleint	1970	1991	55	9	1 (1979)
(Germany) Karl-Heinz Kling	1994	1997	13	-	-
(Czech Republic) Martin Knajzl	1997	2004	31	1	-
(Czech Republic) **Tomáš Knápek**	2016	**Active**	3	-	-
(Netherlands) Hermen Kobus	2013	2016	6	-	-
(Ukraine) Yuriy Kochmar	2014	2014	1	-	-
(Slovakia) **Martin Koči**	2012	**Active**	4	-	-
(Croatia) Manuel Kodelja	2013	2013	1	-	-
(Estonia) Kaspar Koitla	2014	2014	1	-	-
(Bulgaria) Stoyan Kolev	1970	1998	88	3	-
(Greece) Dimitris Koliopanos	2001	2003	3	-	-
(Poland) **Jaroslaw Koltun**	2012	**Active**	15	-	-
(Netherlands) François Koopal	1990	1999	15	-	-
(Czech Republic) **Jan Kopecký**	2001	**Active**	35	14	1 (2013)
(Poland) Andrzej Koper	1976	1995	60	1	-
(Estonia) Timmu Kõrge	2014	2015	3	-	-
(Bulgaria) Nikolay Kortelov	1991	2012	44	-	-
(Poland) Michał Kościuszko	2003	2013	14	-	-
(Czech Republic) Tomáš Kostka	2004	2017	8	-	-
(Sweden) Freddy Kottulinsky	1975	1986	11	-	-
(Bulgaria) Radoslav Kozlekov	1997	2006	21	-	-
(Czech Republic) Ladislav Křeček	1978	2000	62	2	-
(Germany) **Fabian Kreim**	2014	**Active**	8	-	-
(Germany) Armin Kremer	1992	2002	41	11	1 (2001)
(Czech Republic) Roman Kresta	1995	2017	24	8	-
(Luxembourg) Aloyse Kridel	1975	1982	13	1	-
(Sweden) **Tom Kristensson**	2017	**Active**	7	-	-
(Norway) Petter Kristiansen	2012	2016	5	-	-
(East Germany) Klaus-Dieter Krügel	1976	1990	35	-	-
(Poland) Błażej Krupa	1969	1988	51	1	-
(Estonia) Gustav Kruuda	2014	2016	3	-	-
(Estonia) Karl Kruuda	2012	2015	4	-	-
(Poland) Robert Kubica	2013	2014	5	1	-
(Poland) Tomasz Kuchar	1996	2013	32	1	-
(Russia) Alexander Kudryavtsev	2015	2017	3	-	-
(Netherlands) René Kuipers	1996	2000	6	-	-
(Poland) Janusz Kulig	1993	2003	44	11	-
(Sweden) Anders Kulläng	1967	1984	16	1	-
(Czech Republic) Radomír Kupec	2017	2017	2	-	-
(Poland) Leszek Kuzaj	1995	2006	49	7	-
(Socialist Federal Republic of Yugoslavia) Branislav Kuzmič	1977	1991	35	6	-
(Czech Republic) Svatopluk Kvaizar	1975	1988	57	1	-
(Greece) Leonídas Kyrkos	1994	2006	18	6	-
(Finland) Jarmo Kytölehto	1990	1997	17	-	-
(Finland) Antero Laine	1975	1994	38	5	-
(Poland) Dariusz Lamot	2017	2017	1	-	-
(Finland) Simo Lampinen	1961	1979	45	7	-
(France) Alexandre Lanfranchi	2013	2014	2	-	-
(France) Jean-Marc Lanfranchi	2013	2013	1	-	-
(France) Patrick Langiani	2013	2013	1	-	-
(Finland) Esapekka Lappi	2012	2014	12	5	1 (2014)
(Belgium) José Lareppe	1979	2001	50	-	-
(Finland) Taisko Lario	2015	2015	1	-	-
(France) Gérard Larrousse	1963	1973	21	1	-
(Norway) **Frank Tore Larsen**	2016	**Active**	3	-	-
(France) Pierre Lartigue	1977	1985	6	-	-
(Hungary) **Martin László**	2018	**Active**	1	-	-
(South Africa) Henk Lategan	2013	2014	2	-	-
(Finland) Jari-Matti Latvala	2003	2003	3	-	-
(Finland) Tapio Laukkanen	1994	1997	13	-	-
(France) Dominique Laurent	1999	2013	15	-	-
(France) Jean-Matthieu Leandri	2012	2014	9	-	-
(Poland) Arkadiusz Lechoszest	2017	2017	1	-	-
(France) Stéphane Lefebvre	2013	2016	12	-	-
(Finland) JJ Lehto	2000	2003	4	-	-
(Spain) **Yeray Lemes**	2017	**Active**	1	-	-
(France) Hervé Lemonnier	1977	1978	3	-	-
(Russia) Alexander Lesnikov	2000	2003	13	-	-
(Romania) Mihai Leu	2000	2003	4	-	-
(Italy) Piero Liatti	1988	2001	48	13	1 (1991)
(Latvia) Guntis Lielkajis	2013	2013	1	-	-
(Latvia) Toms Lielkājis	2015	2015	1	-	-
(Belgium) Paul Lietaer	1979	1998	48	1	-
(Argentina) Marcos Ligato	2002	2003	2	-	-
(Taiwan) **Hung-Jen Lin**	2018	**Active**	1	-	-
(Taiwan) **Yuan-Hu Lin**	2013	**Active**	3	-	-
(Finland) Sebastian Lindholm	1984	2003	47	4	-
(Estonia) **Georg Linnamäe**	2021	**Active**	5	1	-
(Norway) Tord Linnerud	2001	2003	5	-	-
(Italy) Federica Lio	2013	2013	1	-	-
(Spain) **Efrén Llarena**	2018	**Active**	4	-	-
(United Kingdom) David Llewellin	1984	1995	34	6	-
(France) Sébastien Loeb	1999	2001	3	2	-
(Belgium) Freddy Loix	1990	2016	38	11	-
(Italy) Piero Longhi	1991	2011	69	12	-
(Portugal) Adruzilo Lopes	1988	2014	40	7	-
(Spain) Pepe López	2017	2017	6	-	-
(France) **Pierre-Louis Loubet**	2015	**Active**	3	-	-
(France) Yves Loubet	1978	2001	77	6	1 (1989)
(Czech Republic) Olga Lounová	2012	2014	2	-	-
(Belgium) Guy Louviaux	1999	2001	3	-	-
(United Kingdom) Mark Lovell	1982	1995	30	-	-
(Poland) Bohdan Ludwiczak	1994	1995	2	-	-
(Italy) Matteo Luise	1996	1997	7	-	-
(Hungary) Kornél Lukács	2012	2014	14	-	-
(Czech Republic) **Petr Lukašík**	2013	**Active**	3	-	-
(Russia) **Alexey Lukyanuk**	2013	**Active**	30	8	1 (2018)
(Denmark) Henrik Lundgaard	1991	2003	22	5	1 (2000)
(Italy) Giovanni Lurani	1953	1953	1	-	-
(Estonia) Mait Maarend	2014	2016	3	-	-
(Czech Republic) Dalibor Mach	2016	2016	1	-	-
(Republic of Ireland) **Aaron MacHale**	2014	**Active**	1	-	-
(Republic of Ireland) Austin MacHale	1980	2001	25	-	-
(Portugal) Rui Madeira	1991	2002	23	1	-
(France) François Maestracci	1984	2014	7	-	-
(Portugal) Augusto Magalhães	1986	1999	35	-	-
(Portugal) **Bruno Magalhães**	1999	**Active**	40	3	-
(France) Patrick Magaud	1987	2001	30	-	-
(Belgium) Gerard Magniette	1986	1993	16	-	-
(Belgium) Willy Mairesse	1955	1959	3	1	-
(Slovakia) **Vlastimil Majerčák**	2014	**Active**	1	-	-
(Finland) Timo Mäkinen	1959	1983	59	7	-
(Finland) Tommi Mäkinen	1988	1994	9	1	-
(Hungary) Imre Maksa	1989	2002	9	-	-
(Norway) Per Malling	1955	1956	3	1	-
(Italy) Giovanni Manfrinato	1986	2008	45	-	-
(Cyprus) **Christos Mannouris**	1992	**Active**	5	-	-
(Finland) Marko Mänty	2001	2015	4	-	-
(Czech Republic) **Filip Mareš**	2015	**Active**	11	-	-
(France) Anthony Mariani	2014	2014	1	-	-
(France) Roger Marion	1953	1953	1	-	-
(Romania) Bogdan Marisca	1997	2013	9	-	-
(Greece) **Konstantinos Markouizos**	1999	**Active**	8	-	-
(Estonia) Markko Märtin	1997	2000	2	1	-
(Czech Republic) Roman Martinec	2012	2017	4	-	-
(Spain) Jorge Martínez Cueto	1992	1996	2	-	-
(Portugal) Pedro Matos Chaves	1998	2005	16	-	-
(France) Julien Maurin	2009	2014	3	-	-
(Cyprus) Dimi Mavropoulos	1976	1999	20	1	-
(United Kingdom) Pauline Mayman	1963	1965	6	-	-
(France) François Mazet	1971	1971	1	-	-
(United Kingdom) Dessie McCartney	1973	1982	16	1	-
(United Kingdom) Derek McGarrity	1988	2003	5	-	-
(Republic of Ireland) **Daniel McKenna**	2014	**Active**	1	-	-
(United Kingdom) Kenny McKinstry	1981	1996	16	-	-
(Republic of Ireland) Tim McNulty	2001	2001	1	-	-
(United Kingdom) Alister McRae	1989	2003	25	2	-
(United Kingdom) Colin McRae	1987	1992	19	5	-
(United Kingdom) Jimmy McRae	1976	1993	80	17	-
(United Kingdom) Niall McShea	2000	2004	3	-	-
(Republic of Ireland) Frank Meagher	1991	1995	6	1	-
(United Kingdom) Kris Meeke	2003	2009	3	-	-
(Kenya) Shekhar Mehta	1972	1986	14	1	-
(Italy) **Zelindo Melegari**	1994	**Active**	17	-	-
(Russia) Alexey Mersiyanov	2014	2014	2	-	-
(United Kingdom) Tim Mewett	1992	2002	10	-	-
(France) Sylvain Michel	2012	2017	4	-	-
(United Kingdom) Andy Middlehurst	1986	1986	1	-	-
(France) François Migault	1971	1971	1	-	-
(Russia) Alexander Mikhaylov	2014	2017	4	-	-
(Norway) Andreas Mikkelsen	2012	2012	2	-	-
(Finland) Hannu Mikkola	1964	1986	47	12	-
(Slovakia) Tomáš Minarovič	2017	2017	1	-	-
(Japan) Hideaki Miyoshi	1993	1994	5	-	-
(Italy) Andrea Modanesi	2017	2017	1	-	-
(Norway) Roger Moen	1998	1998	1	-	-
(Republic of Ireland) Josh Moffett	2014	2017	8	-	-
(Germany) Carsten Mohe	1994	2003	32	-	-
(Norway) Greta Molander	1953	1959	9	-	-
(Estonia) Jaan Mölder	2003	2006	2	-	-
(Italy) Franco Carmelo Molica	1999	2017	5	-	-
(Italy) **Tamara Molinaro**	2017	**Active**	7	-	-
(Belgium) Amaury Molle	2014	2015	2	-	-
(Belgium) Didier Monin	1985	1999	36	-	-
(Italy) Francesco Montagna	1998	2014	6	-	-
(Portugal) **Aloísio Monteiro**	2016	**Active**	7	-	-
(Spain) **Luis Monzón**	1987	**Active**	33	5	-
(Germany) Matthias Moosleitner	1972	2003	51	1	-
(Spain) Borja Moratal	1983	1996	42	-	-
(United Kingdom) Donald Morley	1956	1965	23	2	-
(Russia) **Dimi Morozov**	2014?	**Active**	3	-	-
(United Kingdom) John Morton	1981	2003	55	-	-
(Greece) Giorgos Moschous	1978	1986	11	-	-
(Soviet Union) Vyacheslav Mosolov	1961	1967	9	-	-
(United Kingdom) Pat Moss-Carlsson	1958	1973	60	3	-
(United Kingdom) Stirling Moss	1953	1954	3	-	-
(Portugal) **Ricardo Moura**	2001	**Active**	13	1	-
(Portugal) Joaquim Moutinho	1979	1986	12	1	-
(France) Michèle Mouton	1974	1986	35	4	-
(Austria) Christian Mrlik	1998	2012	3	-	-
(Australia) Rex Muldoon	1986	1987	5	-	-
(United Kingdom) Frazer Mulholland	2015	2016	2	-	-
(United Kingdom) **John Mulholland**	2003	**Active**	2	-	-
(Italy) Sandro Munari	1965	1977	33	10	1 (1973)
(Spain) Manuel Muniente	1993	2002	14	1	-
(United Kingdom) **Catie Munnings**	2016	**Active**	17	-	-
(Belgium) Bernard Munster	1983	2006	90	4	-
(Luxembourg) **Grégoire Munster**	2018	**Active**	1	-	-
(Russia) **Artur Muradian**	2016	**Active**	9	-	-
(Estonia) Roland Murakas	2014	2015	2	-	-
(United Kingdom) Sarah Murray	2001	2001	1	-	-
(Germany) Max Nathan	1955	1956	4	-	-
(Italy) Andrea Navarra	1990	2007	44	4	1 (1998)
(Denmark) Jac Nellemann	1971	1971	1	-	-
(Republic of Ireland) Brian Nelson	1974	1979	13	2	-
(Hungary) **László Német**	2015	**Active**	8	-	-
(United Kingdom) Andrew Nesbitt	2003	2003	1	-	-
(Czech Republic) **Petr Nešetřil**	2016	**Active**	2	-	-
(Austria) **Hermann Neubauer**	2012	**Active**	13	-	-
(Germany) Michael Neuschäfer-Rube	1996	2003	7	-	-
(France) Bob Neyret	1960	1972	18	-	-
(France) Jean-Pierre Nicolas	1965	1980	26	10	-
(Italy) Alberto Nicora	2012	2012	1	-	-
(Estonia) Miko-Ove Niinemäe	2015	2016	3	-	-
(Belgium) Phil Nijs	1985	2006	27	-	-
(Finland) Jarkko Nikara	2012	2012	1	-	-
(Latvia) **Reinis Nitišs**	2015	**Active**	2	-	-
(Germany) Uwe Nittel	1992	2002	15	-	-
(Poland) Filip Nivette	2005	2017	5	-	-
(Italy) Gabriele Noberasco	1981	2015	23	-	-
(Brazil) **Paulo Nobre**	2018	**Active**	8	-	-
(Finland) **Juuso Nordgren**	2018	**Active**	3	-	-
(Sweden) Sture Nottorp	1953	1968	2	1	-
(Slovenia) Aljoša Novak	2013	2013	1	-	-
(Italy) **Andrea Nucita**	2012	**Active**	4	-	-
(Czech Republic) Milan Obadal	2016	2017	2	-	-
(Czech Republic) **Roman Odložilík**	2003	**Active**	19	-	-
(Republic of Ireland) Ollie O'Donovan	2003	2003	1	-	-
(France) Jean-Claude Ogier	1965	1982	11	-	-
(Italy) Giacomo Ogliari	1987	2002	8	-	-
(Poland) Sławomir Ogryzek	2013	2015	9	-	-
(Estonia) Oliver Ojaperv	2015	2016	2	-	-
(United Kingdom) Peter O'Kane	2016	2016	1	-	-
(Turkey) **Menderes Okur**	2012	**Active**	2	-	-
(Poland) Maciej Oleksowicz	2003	2013	27	-	-
(Brazil) Daniel Oliveira	2013	2013	2	-	-
(France) Stéphane Onzon	2014	2014	1	-	-
(France) Alain Oreille	1981	1996	59	1	-
(France) Henri Oreiller	1959	1961	4	-	-
(Italy) Federico Ormezzano	1972	1988	43	3	-
(Czech Republic) Jaroslav Orsák	2006	2016	23	-	-
(Spain) Genito Ortiz	1974	1984	27	4	-
(Norway) Mads Østberg	2016	2017	2	-	-
(Norway) Morten Østberg	1987	2003	21	-	-
(East Germany) Kurt Otto	1958	1968	39	-	-
(United Kingdom) Patricia Ozanne	1960	1965	2	-	-
(Turkey) Ümit Can Özdemir	2012	2017	7	-	-
(France) Jonathan Paccini	2014	2014	1	-	-
(Belgium) Stijn Pacolet	2014	2014	1	-	-
(New Zealand) Hayden Paddon	2013	2013	1	-	-
(Finland) Tomi Palmqvist	1983	1990	16	-	-
(Greece) Manolis Panagiotopoulos	1979	2005	39	-	-
(Italy) Marcello Pandiani	2013	2013	1	-	-
(France) Gilles Panizzi	1989	2006	25	4	-
(Cyprus) **Petros Panteli**	2014	**Active**	9	-	-
(France) Benjamin Paoli	2014	2014	1	-	-
(Greece) Ioannis Papadimitriou	1995	2003	20	1	-
(Switzerland) Francesco Parli	2001	2012	14	-	-
(Estonia) Sander Pärn	2014	2015	2	-	-
(United Kingdom) Alex Parpottas	2014	2014	5	-	-
(United Kingdom) Dave Pattison	1996	2002	7	1	-
(United Kingdom) Mike Pattison	1983	2000	16	-	-
(Greece) **Nikos Pavlidis**	1997	**Active**	2	-	-
(Czech Republic) **Václav Pech Jr.**	1998	**Active**	43	8	-
(Italy) Luca Pedersoli	1998	2004	28	2	-
(Slovenia) Darko Peljhan	1993	2013	20	1	-
(France) **Laurent Pellier**	2018	**Active**	7	-	-
(Italy) Alessandro Perico	1998	2013	11	-	-
(Spain) **Surhayen Pernía**	2010	**Active**	5	-	-
(Switzerland) Pascal Perroud	2012	2015	4	-	-
(France) Henri Pescarolo	1966	1970	3	-	-
(Czech Republic) **Jaroslav Pešl**	2014	**Active**	5	-	-
(Czech Republic) Josef Peták	1995	2014	37	-	-
(Bulgaria) Radoslav Petkov	1972	1985	46	1	-
(Croatia) Paulo Petretić	2012	2013	2	-	-
(Slovenia) Uroš Petrič	2011	2011	1	-	-
(Bulgaria) Georgi Petrov	1978	1996	65	8	-
(Greece) **Yorgo Philippedes**	2003	**Active**	3	-	-
(Poland) **Łukasz Pieniążek**	2015	**Active**	3	-	-
(Soviet Union) Aavo Pikkuus	1986	1991	3	-	-
(Portugal) **Luís Pimentel**	1988	**Active**	16	-	-
(Italy) Raffaele Pinto	1968	1979	26	6	1 (1972)
(Lithuania) Jonas Pipiras	2014	2017	5	-	-
(Czech Republic) Zdeněk Pipota	1978	1992	40	-	-
(Italy) Gianandrea Pisani	2017	2017	1	-	-
(Portugal) Renato Pita	2013	2016	14	-	-
(Estonia) Siim Plangi	2013	2016	7	-	-
(Czech Republic) **Zdeněk Pokorný**	2012	**Active**	3	-	-
(Germany) Helmut Polensky	1953	1954	6	3	1 (1953)
(Italy) **Marco Pollara**	2018	**Active**	1	-	-
(Poland) Dariusz Poloński	1999	2017	22	-	-
(Cyprus) **Panikos Polykarpou**	2014	**Active**	5	-	-
(France) Ludovic Pomponi	2013	2013	1	-	-
(Spain) José Maria Ponce	1979	2003	38	4	-
(United Kingdom) Tony Pond	1973	1993	42	8	-
(Czech Republic) Lukáš Pondělíček	2012	2015	3	-	-
(Spain) Xavier Pons	2014	2014	1	-	-
(Bulgaria) Jasen Popov	1993	2006	28	4	-
(Romania) Valentin Porcișteanu	2013	2015	2	-	-
(Cyprus) **Michalis Posedias**	2014	**Active**	4	-	-
(Czech Republic) **Tomáš Pospíšilík**	2014	**Active**	7	-	-
(Denmark) Kristian Poulsen	1997	2003	12	-	-
(France) Renaud Poutot	1996	1996	3	-	-
(Italy) Mauro Pregliasco	1973	1987	74	3	-
(Republic of Ireland) Patrick Price	2001	2001	2	-	-
(Belgium) Kris Princen	1996	2012	31	2	-
(United Kingdom) Peter Procter	1965	1966	2	-	-
(Czech Republic) Martin Prokop	2002	2006	9	-	-
(Ukraine) **Yuriy Protasov**	2008	**Active**	10	1	-
(Poland) Paweł Przybylski	1984	1997	15	1	-
(Cyprus) **Andreas Psaltis**	2018	**Active**	1	-	-
(Poland) **Hubert Ptaszek**	2012	**Active**	6	-	-
(United Kingdom) Nigel Pugh	2001	2001	1	-	-
(Spain) Jesús Puras	1984	2003	38	11	-
(Ukraine) Vitaliy Pushkar	2013	2014	14	-	-
(France) Stéphane Pustelnik	2001	2001	1	-	-
(Finland) Juuso Pykälistö	1996	2003	10	1	-
(Czech Republic) **Martin Rada**	2005	**Active**	8	-	-
(Belgium) **Thibault Radoux**	2012	**Active**	4	-	-
(Sweden) Thomas Rådström	1988	2003	16	3	-
(France) Jean Ragnotti	1970	1996	78	7	-
(Hungary) Péter Ranga	2014	2016	5	-	-
(France) Jean-Michel Raoux	2013	2015	6	-	-
(Italy) Michele Rayneri	1983	1990	20	1	-
(Italy) Felice Re	1997	2002	5	-	-
(Argentina) Jorge Recalde	1985	1988	4	-	-
(Switzerland) Didier Receveur	2012	2012	1	-	-
(Portugal) **Luís Miguel Rego**	2013	**Active**	2	-	-
(Russia) **Sergey Remennik**	2017	**Active**	13	-	-
(Italy) Max Rendina	2012	2017	3	-	-
(Switzerland) Laurent Reuche	2000	2014	5	1	-
(Spain) Estanislao Reverter	1965	1974	12	-	-
(United States) Chuck Rickert	1956	1956	1	-	-
(France) Jean-Luc Rinaldi	1999	2000	2	-	-
(France) Cédric Robert	1997	2005	15	1	-
(Portugal) **Ruben Rodrigues**	2014	**Active**	5	-	-
(Germany) Walter Röhrl	1971	1987	48	19	1 (1974)
(Estonia) Rainer Rohtmets	2014	2015	2	-	-
(Luxembourg) Tommy Rollinger	2014	2014	1	-	-
(Portugal) Manuel Rolo	1980	2003	41	-	-
(Portugal) Francisco Romãozinho	1970	1983	8	-	-
(Finland) Keke Rosberg	2001	2003	3	-	-
(Italy) Luca Rossetti	2001	2017	43	12	3 (2008, 2010, 2011)
(Germany) Horst Rotter	1986	2003	27	-	-
(France) Jean-Pierre Rouget	1966	1986	7	1	-
(France) Benoît Rousselot	1996	2000	11	-	-
(Switzerland) Philippe Roux	1980	2014	27	2	-
(Finland) Harri Rovanperä	1994	2003	10	2	-
(Finland) Kalle Rovanperä	2017	2017	1	-	-
(United Kingdom) Martin Rowe	1991	2001	9	-	-
(Switzerland) Vicente Rubin	2012	2013	2	-	-
(Lithuania) Edvinas Rudaitis	2013	2013	1	-	-
(East Germany) Kurt Rüdiger	1957	1969	41	-	-
(Czech Republic) **Patrik Rujbr**	2012	**Active**	3	-	-
(Poland) Szymon Ruta	2006	2012	16	-	-
(Czech Republic) **Tomáš Růžička**	2012	**Active**	6	-	-
(Poland) Marek Ryndak	1971	2003	36	-	-
(Switzerland) Josias Rywalski	2012	2012	1	-	-
(Poland) Maciej Rzeźnik	2011	2013	7	-	-
(Finland) Esa Saarenpää	1985	2000	27	-	-
(France) Thierry Sabine	1971	1977	8	-	-
(France) Bruno Saby	1972	1990	37	9	-
(France) Julien Saccagi	2013	2013	1	-	-
(Spain) Carlos Sainz	1982	1989	23	7	-
(Italy) Claudio Michele Salerno	1998	2012	3	-	-
(Ukraine) Oleksandr Saliuk Jr.	2003	2012	2	-	-
(Finland) Juha Salo	1997	2015	7	-	-
(Finland) Timo Salonen	1974	1987	17	1	-
(Portugal) **Diogo Salvi**	2014	**Active**	4	-	-
(Russia) Nikolay Samarin	2014	2014	1	-	-
(Sweden) Patrik Sandell	2003	2003	3	-	-
(Portugal) Joaquim Santos	1979	1992	35	9	-
(France) Stéphane Sarrazin	1996	2014	6	2	-
(Croatia) Daniel Šaškin	2000	2013	3	-	-
(Germany) Rudolf Sauerwein	1953	1953	1	-	-
(France) Didier Sauli	2014	2014	1	-	-
(Italy) Adriano Scalcon	1994	1998	3	-	-
(Italy) **Umberto Scandola**	2005	**Active**	6	-	-
(Italy) Giacomo Scattolon	2013	2016	7	-	-
(Luxembourg) Jean-Paul Schammel	1983	2000	8	-	-
(Norway) Martin Schanche	1979	1980	3	-	-
(Norway) Thomas Schie	2000	2003	6	-	-
(Germany) Florestan Schindler	2001	2003	3	-	-
(Germany) Stefan Schlesack	1985	1997	36	-	-
(France) Jo Schlesser	1957	1964	3	-	-
(Switzerland) Ruedi Schmidlin	1986	2014	3	-	-
(Germany) Walter Schock	1956	1960	6	3	2 (1956, 1960)
(Switzerland) Thierry Schoeni	1999	2012	4	-	-
(Germany) Armin Schwarz	1986	2001	30	7	1 (1996)
(Germany) Werner Schweizer	1970	1989	38	1	-
(Italy) Eddie Sciessere	2004	2012	3	-	-
(United Kingdom) Chris Sclater	1969	1978	27	1	-
(Italy) Mauro Scotto	2003	2013	3	-	-
(United Kingdom) Jack Sears	1959	1959	1	-	-
(Croatia) Juraj Šebalj	1996	2013	10	1	-
(Lebanon) Maurice Sehnaoui	1990	1995	3	1	-
(Saar Protectorate) Gert Seibert	1953	1953	2	1	-
(United Kingdom) David Seigle-Morris	1960	1965	23	-	-
(Czech Republic) Martin Semerád	2012	2012	2	-	-
(Germany) Christian Senz	2002	2003	4	-	-
(Estonia) Kenneth Sepp	2014	2016	3	-	-
(Croatia) Žarko Šepetavc	1982	1993	9	1	-
(Greece) **Jourdan Serderidis**	2013	**Active**	6	-	-
(Croatia) Goran Sertić	2012	2012	1	-	-
(Spain) Salvador Servià	1976	1990	48	7	-
(Latvia) **Mārtiņš Sesks**	2016	**Active**	8	-	-
(Tanzania) Bert Shankland	1966	1966	1	-	-
(Japan) Tomoyuki Shinkai	2017	2017	1	-	-
(Republic of Ireland) Rosemary Smith	1962	1985	24	1	-
(Germany) Walter Smolej	1975	1983	28	2	-
(Belgium) Patrick Snijers	1979	2016	153	44	1 (1994)
(France) Dany Snobeck	1972	2000	6	-	-
(Belgium) Ignace Snoeck	1975	1987	41	-	-
(Czech Republic) Pavel Sibera	1985	2001	38	-	-
(Italy) Marco Signor	2006	2012	3	-	-
(Poland) Grzegorz Sikorski	2012	2015	9	-	-
(Lithuania) Aurelijus Simaška	1993	2002	11	-	-
(United Kingdom) **Neil Simpson**	1995	**Active**	11	-	-
(United Kingdom) Lyndon Sims	1956	1956	2	1	-
(Kenya) Joginder Singh	1966	1969	2	-	-
(Estonia) Sander Siniorg	2015	2015	1	-	-
(Latvia) Ralfs Sirmacis	2013	2017	15	3	-
(Czech Republic) Josef Sivík	1974	1992	30	-	-
(United Kingdom) Ken Skidmore	1983	2001	52	-	
(Russia) Mikhail Skripnikov	2014	2015	2	-	-
(Bulgaria) Todor Slavov	2005	2014	13	-	-
(Poland) Marcin Słobodzian	2017	2017	1	-	-
(Netherlands) Rob Slotemaker	1965	1976	16	-	-
(Sweden) Bengt Söderström	1965	1969	17	3	1 (1967 G2)
(Finland) Kristian Sohlberg	2000	2014	9	-	-
(Czech Republic) Jiří Sojka	2012	2013	2	-	-
(Spain) Dani Solà	1999	2007	6	-	-
(Norway) Henning Solberg	1997	2003	12	4	-
(Norway) Petter Solberg	1997	1998	3	1	-
(Spain) Alex Soler-Roig	1957	1959	3	-	-
(Poland) Michał Sołowow	2001	2013	83	6	-
(Spain) **Dani Sordo**	2018	**Active**	1	-	-
(Belgium) Marc Soulet	1984	1994	49	3	-
(Portugal) **Bernardo Sousa**	2006	**Active**	5	1	-
(United Kingdom) Christian South	2014	2014	1	-	-
(United Kingdom) Simon Sparey	1996	1996	4	-	-
(United Kingdom) Will Sparrow	1971	1977	11	-	-
(Austria) Raphael Sperrer	1986	2002	26	2	-
(Monaco) Christophe Spiliotis	1981	1998	21	1	-
(Austria) Gerhard Spitaler	1986	1989	5	-	-
(United Kingdom) John Sprinzel	1959	1968	13	-	-
(Czech Republic) Radim Špůrek	2000	2003	12	1	-
(Czech Republic) Michal Srb	2012	2012	2	-	-
(Netherlands) Hans Stacey	1989	2002	28	1	-
(Switzerland) Erich Stäheli	1992	2014	7	-	-
(Czech Republic) **Vojtěch Štajf**	1999	**Active**	32	-	-
(Poland) Wiesław Stec	1986	2000	27	-	-
(Sweden) Berndt-Inge Steffansson	1980	1988	27	-	-
(Austria) **Roland Stengg**	2018	**Active**	4	-	-
(Belgium) David Sterckx	2000	2003	12	-	-
(Germany) Christian Stockmar	2003	2003	2	-	-
(Austria) Manfred Stohl	1993	2003	15	3	-
(Austria) Rudolf Stohl	1970	1991	14	1	-
(Czech Republic) Jindřich Štolfa	1990	2004	65	-	-
(Germany) Maik Stölzel	1995	2003	15	-	-
(Bulgaria) Ekaterina Stratieva	2006	2017	26	-	-
(Sweden) Ola Strömberg	1977	1990	31	-	-
(Sweden) Lars Stugemo	2015	2016	2	-	-
(Spain) **José Antonio Suárez**	2009	**Active**	10	-	-
(France) Jean-François Succi	2013	2013	1	-	-
(Argentina) Raúl Sufan	1997	1997	1	-	-
(Russia) Evgeniy Sukhovenko	2014	2015	3	-	-
(Estonia) David Sultanjants	2014	2016	3	-	-
(Germany) Raffael Sulzinger	2012	2014	4	-	-
(Finland) Teemu Suninen	2015	2015	1	-	-
(Spain) Ignacio Sunsundegui	1975	1988	4	-	-
(Switzerland) Marc Surer	1983	1986	6	-	-
(Czech Republic) Jan Surovič	2016	2016	1	-	-
(Latvia) Ainārs Šusts	2014	2014	1	-	-
(Denmark) Tim Svanholt	1989	1997	33	-	-
(Lithuania) Vytautas Švedas	2006	2016	5	-	-
(Latvia) Mārtiņš Svilis	2014	2016	3	-	-
(Poland) Piotr Świeboda	1988	1998	17	-	-
(Hungary) Gergely Szabó	1999	2013	10	1	-
(Poland) Andrzej Szarama	2000	2002	7	-	-
(Poland) Jarosław Szeja	2014	2017	5	-	-
(Hungary) János Szilágyi	1999	2012	7	-	-
(Poland) Łukasz Sztuka	1997	2008	22	-	-
(Italy) Fabrizio Tabaton	1975	1997	87	17	2 (1986, 1988)
(France) Jean-Sébastien Tafani	2014	2014	1	-	-
(Czech Republic) **Jan Talaš ml.**	2018	**Active**	1	-	-
(Ukraine) Oleksiy Tamrazov	2012	2016	4	-	-
(Estonia) Ott Tänak	2014	2014	2	1	-
(Belgium) Arthur Tanghe	2014	2014	1	-	-
(United Kingdom) Richard Tannahill	2014	2014	1	-	-
(Germany) Julius Tannert	2014	2016	11	-	-
(Czech Republic) **Jaromír Tarabus**	1999	**Active**	33	-	-
(Italy) Luigi Taramazzo	1965	1969	2	-	-
(United Kingdom) Henry Taylor	1961	1965	16	-	-
(Australia) Molly Taylor	2012	2013	8	-	-
(Austria) Alexander Tazreiter	2012	2012	1	-	-
(United Kingdom) Nabila Tejpar	2016	2016	1	-	-
(Cyprus) **Konstantinos Televantos**	1991	**Active**	4	-	-
(Italy) Marco Tempestini	1994	2014	13	-	-
(Romania) **Simone Tempestini**	2013	**Active**	15	-	-
(Portugal) **Ricardo Teodósio**	2003	**Active**	8	-	-
(Cyprus) Vahan Terzian	1979	1994	15	1	-
(France) Jean-Luc Thérier	1970	1984	15	2	-
(Belgium) Rocco Theunissen	1996	2003	31	2	-
(Belgium) Bruno Thiry	1984	2014	78	14	1 (2003)
(United Kingdom) Euan Thorburn	2015	2016	3	-	-
(Sweden) Pontus Tidemand	2013	2013	1	-	-
(Belgium) Marc Timmers	1983	2001	46	1	-
(Cyprus) Charalambos Timotheou	2014	2017	4	-	-
(Romania) Florin Tincescu	2013	2015	14	-	-
(France) Brice Tirabassi	1998	2005	7	-	-
(Czech Republic) **Antonín Tlusťák**	2000	**Active**	107	1	-
(Italy) Giuseppe Tobia	2013	2013	1	-	-
(Italy) Tonino Tognana	1978	1984	24	4	-
(Finland) Harri Toivonen	1980	1988	22	1	-
(Finland) Henri Toivonen	1976	1986	33	6	-
(Finland) Pauli Toivonen	1959	1977	37	6	1 (1968)
(Finland) Joonas Tokee	2016	2016	4	-	-
(Poland) Jerzy Tomaszczyk	2017	2017	1	-	-
(Bulgaria) Ilian Toplodolski	1977	2004	38	-	-
(Switzerland) Robert Torday	1992	1995	9	1	-
(Sweden) Lars-Erik Torph	1980	1988	11	-	-
(United Kingdom) Jack Tordoff	1966	1975	8	1	-
(Italy) Leonardo Toti	1997	1997	2	-	-
(Czech Republic) Jan Trajbold	1974	1994	61	-	-
(Sweden) Tom Trana	1962	1969	26	5	1 (1964)
(France) René Trautmann	1960	1970	41	1	-
(Italy) Renato Travaglia	1990	2011	70	17	2 (2002, 2005)
(Slovenia) Jani Trček	1989	2013	13	-	-
(Uruguay) Gustavo Trelles	1987	1995	15	1	-
(Hungary) József Trencsényi	2003	2015	3	-	-
(Czech Republic) Emil Triner	1989	2012	37	1	-
(Belgium) **Pieter Tsjoen**	1998	**Active**	28	3	-
(Cyprus) **Alexandros Tsouloftas**	2017	**Active**	4	-	-
(Australia) Ken Tubman	1965	1965	1	-	-
(Czech Republic) Marcel Tuček	1983	2014	72	-	-
(Kenya) Carl Tundo	1996	1996	1	-	-
(Finland) Janne Tuohino	1996	2003	7	1	-
(Hungary) Frigyes Turán	2013	2013	4	-	-
(Monaco) Auguste Turiani	1974	1999	38	-	-
(Slovenia) Rok Turk	2003	2015	14	-	-
(Russia) Petr Turkin	2014	2016	3	-	-
(Ukraine) Inessa Tushkanova	2012	2015	7	-	-
(Czech Republic) Pavlína Tydlačková	2017	2017	1	-	-
(Israel) Sergey Uger	2003	2016	6	-	-
(East Germany) Hans Ullmann	1961	1977	38	-	-
(United Kingdom) Bernard Unett	1977	1978	3	-	-
(France) Malik Unia	2002	2002	1	-	-
(Estonia) Rasmus Uustulnd	2015	2015	1	-	-
(France) Jean Valabrègue	1966	1970	2	-	-
(Finland) Jussi Välimäki	1999	2003	6	-	-
(Czech Republic) Pavel Valoušek	2000	2017	19	-	-
(Belgium) Patrick Vandeputte	2001	2016	10	-	-
(Belgium) Valère Vandermaesen	1981	1990	49	-	-
(United Kingdom) Sheila van Damm	1953	1955	3	-	-
(Netherlands) Kevin van Deijne	2013	2014	2	-	-
(Netherlands) Eddy van den Hoorn	1992	1999	23	-	-
(Netherlands) Jan van der Marel	1974	1998	54	1	-
(Belgium) Jean-Pierre van de Wauwer	1979	2004	79	1	-
(Czech Republic) **Michal Vaňhara**	2012	**Active**	4	-	-
(Netherlands) Piet van Hoof	1999	2005	7	-	-
(Belgium) Gregoire Vankemmel	2014	2014	1	-	-
(Netherlands) Gijs van Lennep	1966	1968	2	-	-
(Netherlands) Peter van Merksteijn Sr.	1987	1994	23	-	-
(Netherlands) Marcel van Vliet	1996	1996	2	-	-
(Belgium) Chris Van Woensel	1993	2004	40	-	-
(Norway) Roar Vannebo	1983	2002	17	-	-
(Belgium) Davy Vanneste	2000	2016	16	-	-
(Republic of Ireland) Cecil Vard	1953	1971	3	-	-
(Greece) Giannis Vardinogiannis	1984	1995	14	1	-
(Poland) Marek Varisella	1960	1977	13	-	-
(Hungary) Szabolcs Várkonyi	1995	2016	13	-	-
(Greece) Kostantinos Varnakiotis	2001	2004	6	1	-
(Russia) Yevgeniy Vasin	1991	2003	19	-	-
(Lithuania) Linas Vaškys	2017	2017	1	-	-
(Finland) Ari Vatanen	1972	1983	31	7	-
(Finland) Max Vatanen	2013	2016	4	-	-
(Norway) Ole Christian Veiby	2015	2015	2	-	-
(Slovenia) Andrej Velkavrh	2013	2013	1	-	-
(Belgium) Alexandre Verbeke	2013	2016	4	-	-
(Italy) Giovanni Vergnano	2011	2011	9	-	-
(Italy) Maurizio Verini	1970	2013	46	6	1 (1975)
(France) Anne-Charlotte Verney	1974	1977	2	-	-
(Belgium) Renaud Verreydt	1984	2001	57	6	-
(France) Lilian Vialle	1997	1999	2	-	-
(Portugal) **Carlos Vieira**	2016	**Active**	3	-	-
(Finland) Saku Vierimaa	1983	2005	30	-	-
(Italy) Luigi Villoresi	1958	1958	2	-	-
(France) Jean Vinatier	1962	1973	19	-	-
(France) Francis Vincent	1974	1989	17	3	-
(Italy) Andrea Vineis	2017	2017	1	-	-
(Andorra) Joan Vinyes	1998	2013	9	1	-
(Estonia) **Robert Virves**	2022	**Active**	5	-	-
(Italy) **Mattia Vita**	2018	**Active**	6	-	-
(Hungary) Lászlo Vizin	1990	2014	26	-	-
(Czech Republic) **Martin Vlček**	2012	**Active**	7	-	-
(Estonia) Karl Martin Volver	2015	2015	1	-	-
(Germany) Paul von Metternich	1954	1970	9	-	-
(Germany) **Albert von Thurn und Taxis**	2017	**Active**	14	-	-
(Latvia) **Janis Vorobjovs**	2002	**Active**	7	-	-
(Russia) Dmitriy Voronov	2014	2014	1	-	-
(France) Cyril Vosahlo	1996	2012	9	-	-
(Netherlands) Henk Vossen	1974	2006	79	1	-
(France) Nicolas Vouilloz	2001	2009	5	2	-
(Greece) Armodios Vovos	1993	2006	22	6	-
(Italy) Adartico Vudafieri	1977	1984	40	17	1 (1981)
(Austria) **Julian Wagner**	2017	**Active**	2	-	-
(Austria) **Simon Wagner**	2016	**Active**	7	-	-
(Belgium) William Wagner	2015	2015	1	-	-
(Sweden) Björn Waldegård	1965	1993	29	5	-
(Sweden) Pernilla Walfridsson	1997	2000	13	-	-
(Sweden) Stig-Olov Walfridsson	1985	2003	38	-	-
(Germany) Sandro Wallenwein	1999	2003	15	-	-
(United Kingdom) Johnny Wallwork	1954	1960	5	1	-
(Germany) Achim Warmbold	1970	1981	44	12	-
(Germany) Antony Warmbold	2000	2002	10	-	-
(United Kingdom) Neil Wearden	1995	2001	9	-	-
(Germany) Erwin Weber	1981	1997	46	15	1 (1992)
(Republic of Ireland) Mervyn Wedlock	2014	2014	1	-	-
(Poland) Adam Wędrychowski	1961	1966	6	-	-
(Germany) Edith Weiss	2017	2017	1	-	-
(Germany) Anton Werner	1994	2003	30	-	-
(United Kingdom) Nick West	1992	2013	4	-	-
(Netherlands) Erik Wevers	1998	2003	14	1	-
(Austria) Wilfried Wiedner	1978	1991	21	4	-
(Germany) Sepp Wiegand	2012	2015	10	-	-
(Belgium) Michel Wilders	1987	2006	46	-	-
(United Kingdom) Guy Wilks	2001	2009	2	-	-
(United Kingdom) Malcolm Wilson	1977	1995	44	3	-
(Austria) **Enrico Windisch**	2018	**Active**	1	-	-
(Australia) Arron Windus	2016	2016	1	-	-
(Austria) Patrick Winter	2012	2012	1	-	-
(Austria) Franz Wittmann Jr.	2003	2009	2	-	-
(Austria) Franz Wittmann Sr.	1973	2003	67	30	-
(Germany) Jean-Martin Wolf	2003	2003	1	-	-
(United States) Jon Woodner	1983	1987	8	-	-
(United Kingdom) Robert Woodside	2001	2016	5	-	-
(Republic of Ireland) **Stephen Wright**	2014	**Active**	2	-	-
(Poland) **Kacper Wróblewski**	2018	**Active**	1	-	-
(Austria) Franz Wurz	1983	1990	3	1	-
(United Kingdom) Emlyn Wynne	1994	1996	8	-	-
(Belarus) Dmitriy Yakimakho	2012	2013	5	-	-
(United Kingdom) **Rhys Yates**	2016	**Active**	5	-	-
(Taiwan) **Dai-Wei Yein**	2013	**Active**	6	-	-
(Cyprus) **Panayiotis Yiangou**	2015	**Active**	6	-	-
(Slovenia) Rajko Žakelj	2012	2012	1	-	-
(Spain) Antonio Zanini	1972	1986	77	18	1 (1980)
(Italy) Andrea Zanussi	1980	1989	43	6	-
(Poland) Sobiesław Zasada	1960	1974	65	9	3 (1966 G2, 1967 G1, 1971)
(Germany) Axel Zäuner	1985	1998	26	-	-
(Poland) **Aleksander Zawada**	2013	**Active**	21	-	-
(Germany) Peter Zehetmaier	1994	2003	25	-	-
(Italy) Gianmarino Zenere	1986	1998	25	1	-
(Russia) Andrey Zhigunov	1996	2003	8	-	-
(Austria) Robert Zitta	1977	2013	11	-	-
(Bulgaria) Tihomir Zlatkov	1983	2003	58	-	-
(Germany) Martin Zondler	1992	1996	3	-	-
(Greece) **Ioannis Zounis**	2004	**Active**	4	-	-
(Socialist Federal Republic of Yugoslavia) Romana Zrnec	1983	1990	11	-	-
(Slovenia) Asja Zupanc	2003	2013	2	-	-

== See also ==
- List of World Rally Championship drivers
