= List of World Rally Championship drivers =

This is an incomplete list of drivers who have entered a World Rally Championship event.

Active drivers (listed in bold in the tables) are those who have entered a WRC event within the past twelve months. Drivers with at least 5 starts or a podium finish are included.

== All WRC drivers ==
Driver	First season	Final season	WRC rallies	WRC podiums	WRC wins	WRC championships
(Norway) Erik Aaby	1973	1981	5	-	-	-
(Finland) Rauno Aaltonen	1973	1987	25	6	-	-
(Norway) Marius Aasen	2010	2017	24	-	-	-
(Estonia) Urmo Aava	2002	2009	51	-	-	-
(Netherlands) Kevin Abbring	2007	2018	39	-	-	-
(Argentina) Arturo Abella Nazar	1997	2005	8	-	-	-
(Italy) Andrea Aghini	1987	2000	26	5	1	-
(Austria) Andreas Aigner	2005	2012	32	-	-	-
(Finland) Pentti Airikkala	1973	2003	36	6	1	-
(United Kingdom) Louise Aitken-Walker	1979	1991	22	-	-	-
(Indonesia) Subhan Aksa	2007	2014	22	-	-	-
(Qatar) Nasser Al-Attiyah	2004	2015	73	-	-	-
(Qatar) Abdulaziz Al-Kuwari	2012	2016	23	-	-	-
(United Arab Emirates) Khalid Al-Qassimi	2004	2018	73	-	-	-
(Saudi Arabia) Yazeed Al-Rajhi	2008	2018	46	-	-	-
(Oman) Hamed Al-Wahaibi	1997	2005	40	-	-	-
(Finland) Markku Alén	1973	2001	130	56	19	1978*
(Italy) Paolo Alessandrini	1986	1989	8	-	-	-
(Sweden) Arne Allansson	1973	1983	5	-	-	-
(New Zealand) Neil Allport	1983	2005	15	-	-	-
(Argentina) Juan Carlos Alonso	2002	2017	19	-	-	-
(Argentina) Benjamín Alvarez	2000	2005	5	-	-	-
(Russia) Sergey Alyasov	1988	1995	16	-	-	-
(France) Alain Ambrosino	1974	1990	19	3	1	-
(Lebanon) Nicolas Amiouni	2011	2015	9	-	-	-
(Sweden) Ove Andersson	1973	1982	28	7	1	-
(Sweden) Per-Gunnar Andersson	2002	2013	74	-	-	-
(Italy) Paolo Andreucci	1989	2015	13	-	-	-
(France) Jean-Claude Andruet	1973	1995	29	7	3	-
(Argentina) Jorge Angeloni	1999	2005	5	-	-	-
(Kenya) Azar Anwar	1981	2001	12	-	-	-
(Japan) Hiroki Arai	2016	2018	11	-	-	-
(Japan) Toshi Arai	1997	2010	86	-	-	-
(Portugal) Armindo Araújo	2001	2012	44	-	-	-
(Luxembourg) Hugo Arellano	2007	2014	5	-	-	-
(New Zealand) Geoff Argyle	1994	2004	11	-	-	-
(Ukraine) Oleksandr Artemenko	1989	1996	9	-	-	-
(France) Mathieu Arzeno	2010	2018	10	-	-	-
(Lebanon) Samir Assef	1978	1992	15	-	-	-
(Sweden) Leif Asterhag	1973	1994	18	-	-	-
(Greece) Lambros Athanassoulas	2005	2016	14	-	-	-
(Australia) Chris Atkinson	2004	2014	77	6	-	-
(France) Didier Auriol	1984	2005	152	53	20	1994
(Italy) Fulvio Bacchelli	1973	1982	17	2	1	-
(Germany) Christian Bächle	2011	2017	5	-	-	-
(Saudi Arabia) Abdullah Bakhashab	1998	2002	30	-	-	-
(San Marino) Mirco Baldacci	2000	2008	58	-	-	-
(Italy) Amilcare Ballestrieri	1973	1977	10	-	-	-
(Italy) Sergio Barbasio	1973	1974	8	-	-	-
(Republic of Ireland) Robert Barrable	2013	2014	9	-	-	-
(United Kingdom) Natalie Barratt	1998	2006	44	-	-	-
(Germany) Jürgen Barth	1977	2001	13	-	-	-
(Italy) Giandomenico Basso	1998	2012	17	-	-	-
(Australia) Neal Bates	1991	2001	12	-	-	-
(Austria) Raimund Baumschlager	1987	2007	12	-	-	-
(France) Marie-Claude Beaumont	1973	1974	5	-	-	-
(Australia) Marty Beckton	1995	1999	5	-	-	-
(France) Bernard Béguin	1974	1993	17	3	1	-
(Argentina) Sebastián Beltrán	2000	2008	18	-	-	-
(Australia) Wayne Bell	1987	1998	19	-	-	-
(France) Alexandre Bengué	1999	2006	14	-	-	-
(Slovakia) Jozef Béreš jun.	2003	2007	20	-	-	-
(Sweden) Emil Bergkvist	2015	2019	19	-	-	-
(Italy) Lorenzo Bertelli	2011	2025	65	-	-	-
(Argentina) Jorge Bescham	1987	2000	8	-	-	-
(Paraguay) Augusto Bestard	2014	2016	8	-	-	-
(Italy) Alessandro Bettega	2005	2009	23	-	-	-
(Italy) Attilio Bettega	1978	1985	24	6	-	-
(Italy) Miki Biasion	1980	1995	81	40	17	1988, 1989
(Poland) Marian Bień	1973	1977	5	-	-	-
(United Arab Emirates) Mohammed Bin Sulayem	1988	1995	22	-	-	-
(Argentina) Ricardo Bissio	1997	2005	7	-	-	-
(United States) Ken Block	2007	2018	25	-	-	-
(Sweden) Stig Blomqvist	1973	2006	123	33	11	1984
(United Kingdom) David Bogie	2014	2018	5	-	-	-
(Republic of Ireland) **Eamonn Boland**	1999	**Active**	75	-	-	-
(Soviet Union) Nikolai Bolskhikh	1977	1990	7	-	-	-
(France) Yoann Bonato	2006	2021	30	-	-	-
(Portugal) António Borges	1973	1983	5	-	-	-
(Turkey) Murat Bostancı	2008	2019	12	-	-	-
(Argentina) Guillermo Bottazzini	2000	2005	6	-	-	-
(France) Bryan Bouffier	2007	2018	19	1	-	-
(New Zealand) Possum Bourne	1983	2003	44	1	-	-
(Canada) Walter Boyce	1973	1986	6	2	1	-
(Italy) Enrico Brazzoli	2015	2025	37	-	-	-
(Republic of Ireland) Craig Breen	2009	2023	82	9	-	-
(United Kingdom) Ben Briant	1999	2002	8	-	-	-
(United Kingdom) Russell Brookes	1973	1994	22	3	-	-
(Soviet Union) Stasys Brundza	1973	1985	19	-	-	-
(Norway) Eyvind Brynildsen	2006	2024	53	-	-	-
(United States) John Buffum	1973	2000	17	2	-	-
(France) Philippe Bugalski	1984	2003	36	4	2	-
(Germany) Aaron Burkart	2003	2011	38	-	-	-
(United Kingdom) Richard Burns	1990	2003	107	34	12	2001
(Switzerland) **Olivier Burri**	1991	**Active**	27	-	-	-
(Switzerland) Philippe Camandona	1987	1995	5	-	-	-
(France) Eric Camilli	2014	2022	50	-	-	-
(France) Pierre Campana	2007	2012	5	-	-	-
(Argentina) Alejandro Cancio	2002	2019	7	-	-	-
(Andorra) Joan Carchat	2014	2015	8	-	-	-
(Sweden) Daniel Carlsson	1999	2007	44	1	-	-
(Sweden) Ingvar Carlsson	1974	1994	42	4	2	-
(Sweden) Lars Carlsson	1973	1982	10	-	-	-
(Sweden) Patric Carlsson	1997	2001	5	-	-	-
(Sweden) Per Carlsson	1979	1982	5	-	-	-
(Australia) Greg Carr	1979	1996	7	-	-	-
(Argentina) Roberto Castelli	1999	2003	5	-	-	-
(United Kingdom) Tom Cave	2008	2019	23	-	-	-
(Italy) Dario Cerrato	1974	1993	21	2	-	-
(Turkey) Burcu Çetinkaya	2006	2010	14	-	-	-
(Australia) Tolley Challis	1990	2004	13	-	-	-
(France) Sébastien Chardonnet	2012	2015	22	-	-	-
(France) Guy Chasseuil	1973	1985	15	-	-	-
(France) François Chatriot	1976	1993	24	4	-	-
(Portugal) Pedro Matos Chaves	1993	2001	5	-	-	-
(France) Guerlain Chicherit	2004	2004	10	-	-	-
(France) Nicolas Ciamin	2016	2024	36	-	-	-
(Poland) Tomasz Ciecierzyński	1975	1982	7	-	-	-
(United Kingdom) Barry Clark	2003	2008	18	-	-	-
(United Kingdom) Roger Clark	1973	1995	21	5	1	-
(Belgium) Bob Colsoul	1999	2004	40	-	-	-
(United Kingdom) Louise Cook	2012	2019	13	-	-	-
(Italy) Carlo Covi	2011	2025	33	-	-	-
(United Kingdom) Andrew Cowan	1973	1981	17	2	-	-
(Argentina) Alfredo Cravero	1999	2005	6	-	-	-
(Australia) Cody Crocker	1995	2005	17	-	-	-
(Republic of Ireland) Brendan Cumiskey	2011	2023	7	-	-	-
(Italy) Franco Cunico	1981	2000	20	2	1	-
(France) Christine Dacremont	1973	1978	6	-	-	-
(United Kingdom) Justin Dale	2002	2006	5	-	-	-
(Italy) Andrea Dallavilla	1993	2005	26	-	-	-
(Sweden) Bror Danielsson	1973	1997	28	1	-	-
(France) Bernard Darniche	1973	1987	38	11	7	-
(Belgium) Grégoire De Mévius	1988	2001	42	-	-	-
(Uruguay) Domingo De Vitta	1980	1984	5	2	-	-
(Argentina) Gustavo Dechecchi	1986	2005	5	-	-	-
(France) François Delecour	1984	2017	106	19	4	-
(Switzerland) Federico della Casa	2012	2016	16	-	-	-
(Monaco) **Marc Dessi**	1979	**Active**	40	-	-	-
(Republic of Ireland) Callum Devine	2017	2018	6	-	-	-
(Australia) Jacqueline Dines	1992	2001	10	-	-	-
(Bulgaria) Krum Domchev	2003	2010	6	-	-	-
(Poland) Aron Domżała	2012	2014	6	-	-	-
(France) Christian Dorche	1973	1993	28	-	-	-
(France) Daniel Ducruet	1993	1997	6	-	-	-
(Belgium) Marc Duez	1983	2015	26	-	-	-
(France) Romain Dumas	2012	2017	8	-	-	-
(Kenya) Ian Duncan	1983	1999	17	4	1	-
(Australia) Ross Dunkerton	1988	1994	12	1	-	-
(Belgium) François Duval	2001	2010	84	14	1	-
(United Kingdom) Jeremy Easson	1985	2002	17	-	-	-
(Sweden) Per Eklund	1973	1987	84	13	1	-
(United Kingdom) Nik Elsmore	1978	2003	7	-	-	-
(San Marino) Massimo Ercolani	1980	1997	17	-	-	-
(Sweden) Mikael Ericsson	1981	1993	40	7	2	-
(Sweden) Kenneth Eriksson	1980	2002	141	21	6	-
(United Kingdom) **Elfyn Evans**	2007	**Active**	159	46	11	-
(United Kingdom) Gwyndaf Evans	1987	2008	32	-	-	-
(Australia) Simon Evans	1997	2002	8	-	-	-
(United Kingdom) Tony Fall	1973	1976	10	-	-	-
(Jordan) Amjad Farrah	2006	2010	10	-	-	-
(Italy) Antonio Fassina	1976	1981	6	3	1	-
(Lebanon) Roger Feghali	2001	2002	6	-	-	-
(Portugal) António Ferreira da Cunha	1973	1993	9	-	-	-
(France) Guy Fiori	1982	2017	20	-	-	-
(Italy) Alex Fiorio	1986	2002	51	10	-	-
(Austria) Georg Fischer	1973	1991	19	-	-	-
(United Kingdom) Alastair Fisher	2009	2014	23	-	-	-
(Sweden) Patrik Flodin	2005	2011	39	-	-	-
(Andorra) Ferran Font	1993	2005	25	-	-	-
(France) **Adrien Fourmaux**	2019	**Active**	74	9	-	-
(United Kingdom) Tony Fowkes	1973	1984	5	1	-	-
(France) Jean-Baptiste Franceschi	2018	2018	10	-	-	-
(France) Guy Fréquelin	1973	1987	35	7	1	-
(West Germany) Klaus Fritzinger	1973	1989	12	-	-	-
(Peru) Nicolás Fuchs	2009	2016	42	-	-	-
(Japan) Yoshio Fujimoto	1991	1998	18	-	-	-
(Belgium) Pascal Gaban	1987	1990	15	1	-	-
(Paraguay) Marco Galanti	1994	2003	8	-	-	-
(Republic of Ireland) Shaun Gallagher	2003	2009	17	-	-	-
(Italy) Gigi Galli	1998	2008	66	2	-	-
(Argentina) Martín Gallusser	1997	2005	9	-	-	-
(Spain) Enrique García Ojeda	1998	2013	8	-	-	-
(Finland) Toni Gardemeister	1996	2010	112	6	-	-
(Germany) Hermann Gassner Jr	2007	2019	29	-	-	-
(Germany) Hermann Gassner Sr	1995	2018	24	-	-	-
(Argentina) Pablo Gaviña	1995	2002	7	-	-	-
(Bulgaria) Georgi Geradzhiev Jr.	2003	2005	12	-	-	-
(Italy) Roberto Ghiringhelli	1989	1999	7	-	-	-
(France) Quentin Gilbert	2012	2017	38	-	-	-
(India) Gaurav Gill	2008	2023	12	-	-	-
(United Kingdom) Rob Gill	2001	2015	8	-	-	-
(New Zealand) Emma Gilmour	2002	2012	22	-	-	-
(United Kingdom) Alistair Ginley	2000	2004	20	-	-	-
(Soviet Union) Kastytis Girdauskas	1973	1981	12	-	-	-
(United Kingdom) Russell Gooding	1982	1985	6	-	-	-
(Ukraine) Valeriy Gorban	2009	2017	50	-	-	-
(France) Henri Gréder	1973	1980	9	-	-	-
(New Zealand) Brian Green	1977	2012	15	-	-	-
(United Kingdom) Gus Greensmith	2014	2025	99	-	-	-
(Germany) Marijan Griebel	2011	2022	10	-	-	-
(Austria) Werner Grissmann	1982	1986	9	-	-	-
(Norway) Anders Grøndal	2004	2017	19	-	-	-
(Finland) Marcus Grönholm	1989	2019	153	61	30	2000, 2002
(Sweden) Kalle Grundel	1977	1988	30	1	-	-
(Mexico) Benito Guerra	2006	2022	44	-	-	-
(Austria) Sepp Haider	1977	1993	14	1	1	-
(South Africa) Ashley Haigh-Smith	2011	2012	5	-	-	-
(Finland) Kyösti Hämäläinen	1973	1988	19	1	1	-
(Finland) Raimo Hämeenniemi	1974	2000	14	-	-	-
(Finland) Juho Hänninen	2006	2019	56	1	-	-
(Norway) John Haugland	1973	1990	25	-	-	-
(United Kingdom) Nigel Heath	1993	2006	40	-	-	-
(France) Jacques Henry	1973	1976	5	-	-	-
(Australia) Dean Herridge	1995	2006	18	-	-	-
(Kenya) Edgar Herrmann	1973	1985	6	-	-	-
(United Kingdom) David Higgins	1994	2008	16	-	-	-
(United Kingdom) Mark Higgins	1990	2013	47	-	-	-
(Finland) Mikko Hirvonen	2002	2014	160	69	15	-
(Italy) Luca Hoelbling	2004	2025	18	-	-	-
(France) Marianne Hoepfner	1973	1981	10	-	-	-
(New Zealand) David Holder	2018	2018	5	-	-	-
(Germany) Isolde Holderied	1992	1999	24	-	-	-
(Poland) Krzysztof Hołowczyc	1996	2015	21	-	-	-
(Kenya) Peter Horsey	2010	2010	6	-	-	-
(United Kingdom) Harry Hunt	2010	2011	16	-	-	-
(Finland) Jari Huttunen	2015	2023	34	-	-	-
(United Kingdom) Chris Ingram	2013	2018	8	-	-	-
(Turkey) Volkan Işık	1998	2006	20	-	-	-
(United Kingdom) Tony Jardine	1991	2016	24	-	-	-
(Poland) Andrzej Jaroszewicz	1973	1979	7	-	-	-
(Estonia) Raul Jeets	2017	2021	7	-	-	-
(United Kingdom) Jonathan Joannides	1985	1995	7	-	-	-
(Lithuania) Deividas Jocius	2008	2018	5	-	-	-
(Sweden) Tobias Johansson	2002	2005	12	-	-	-
(New Zealand) Reece Jones	1982	2002	19	-	-	-
(United Kingdom) Tim Jones	2008	2015	7	-	-	-
(Sweden) Lasse Jönsson	1973	1985	7	-	-	-
(Sweden) Mats Jonsson	1979	2007	40	3	2	-
(Mexico) Michel Jourdain Jr.	2010	2011	8	-	-	-
(United Kingdom) Terry Kaby	1975	1990	18	-	-	-
(Sweden) Harry Källström	1973	1980	28	4	1	-
(Estonia) Martin Kangur	2010	2014	8	-	-	-
(Finland) Juha Kankkunen	1979	2010	166	75	23	1986, 1987, 1991, 1993
(Turkey) Fatih Kara	2004	2006	8	-	-	-
(Sweden) Ramona Karlsson	2008	2012	5	-	-	-
(Finland) Kosti Katajamäki	2001	2006	35	-	-	-
(Japan) **Takamoto Katsuta**	2016	**Active**	93	7	-	-
(Estonia) Egon Kaur	2006	2023	22	-	-	-
(Finland) Jari Ketomaa	2000	2015	42	-	-	-
(Ukraine) Oleksiy Kikireshko	2011	2015	22	-	-	-
(Finland) Leo Kinnunen	1973	1982	7	1	-	-
(Kenya) Mike Kirkland	1973	1991	24	5	-	-
(West Germany) Jochi Kleint	1973	1991	23	1	-	-
(Japan) Wakujiro Kobayashi	1995	2008	17	-	-	-
(Slovakia) Martin Koči	2012	2017	30	-	-	-
(Serbia) Miloš Komljenović	2007	2008	10	-	-	-
(Czech Republic) Jan Kopecký	2002	2008	31	-	-	-
(Poland) Szymon Kornicki	2014	2014	5	-	-	-
(Poland) Michał Kościuszko	2006	2013	52	-	-	-
(Sweden) Freddy Kottulinsky	1973	1979	5	-	-	-
(Germany) Fabian Kreim	2014	2021	8	-	-	-
(Czech Republic) Roman Kresta	2001	2005	35	-	-	-
(Germany) Armin Kremer	1995	2017	37	-	-	-
(Sweden) Johan Kristoffersson	2016	2021	6	-	-	-
(East Germany) Wolfgang Krügel	1983	1989	7	-	-	-
(Estonia) Karl Kruuda	2010	2020	36	-	-	-
(Poland) Robert Kubica	2013	2016	33	-	-	-
(Poland) Tomasz Kuchar	1999	2004	21	-	-	-
(Netherlands) Dennis Kuipers	2008	2014	27	-	-	-
(Netherlands) René Kuipers	2000	2011	15	-	-	-
(Poland) Janusz Kulig	1999	2003	11	-	-	-
(Sweden) Anders Kulläng	1973	1988	45	4	1	-
(Poland) Leszek Kuzaj	1998	2007	18	-	-	-
(Finland) Jarmo Kytölehto	1990	1999	21	2	-	-
(Finland) Lasse Lampi	1977	1996	36	1	-	-
(Finland) Simo Lampinen	1973	1979	34	5	-	-
(Finland) **Esapekka Lappi**	2011	**Active**	90	15	2	-
(Finland) Taisko Lario	2015	2018	12	-	-	-
(France) Nicolas Latil	2000	2024	7	-	-	-
(Finland) Jari-Matti Latvala	2002	2025	212	67	18	-
(Finland) Tapio Laukkanen	1994	2003	23	-	-	-
(France) Claude Laurent	1973	1982	20	-	-	-
(France) Jean-Claude Lefèbvre	1973	1981	13	-	-	-
(France) Stéphane Lefebvre	2013	2024	49	-	-	-
(Spain) Yeray Lemes	2007	2016	25	-	-	-
(Italy) Piero Liatti	1990	2004	55	9	1	-
(Hong Kong) Michael Lieu	1988	1996	7	-	-	-
(Argentina) Marcos Ligato	1998	2016	62	-	-	-
(Estonia) Georg Linnamäe	2019	2025	34	-	-	-
(United Kingdom) David Llewellin	1984	1994	16	-	-	-
(Andorra) Albert Llovera	2001	2012	29	-	-	-
(France) Sébastien Loeb	1999	2022	184	120	80	2004, 2005, 2006, 2007, 2008, 2009, 2010, 2011, 2012
(Belgium) Freddy Loix	1993	2004	93	3	-	-
(France) Pierre-Louis Loubet	2015	2023	70	-	-	-
(France) Yves Loubet	1977	1999	30	4	-	-
(Hungary) Kornél Lukács	2014	2015	7	-	-	-
(Estonia) Mait Maarend	2013	2016	7	-	-	-
(Republic of Ireland) Gareth MacHale	2006	2009	14	-	-	-
(Portugal) Rui Madeira	1992	2014	28	-	-	-
(Argentina) Nicolás Madero	2005	2015	6	-	-	-
(Finland) Timo Mäkinen	1973	1994	39	7	4	-
(Finland) Tommi Mäkinen	1987	2003	143	45	24	1996, 1997, 1998, 1999
(United Kingdom) Penny Mallory	1991	2000	6	-	-	-
(Italy) Giovanni Manfrinato	1986	2014	48	-	-	-
(Argentina) Daniel Marrochi	2000	2004	5	-	-	-
(Estonia) Markko Märtin	1997	2005	84	18	5	-
(New Zealand) Richard Mason	2001	2012	11	-	-	-
(France) Julien Maurin	2010	2016	27	-	-	-
(Malaysia) Saladin Mazlan	1997	2001	9	-	-	-
(New Zealand) Joe McAndrew	1988	2000	8	-	-	-
(United Kingdom) Marty McCormack	2011	2015	8	-	-	-
(Republic of Ireland) Daniel McKenna	2013	2015	5	-	-	-
(United Kingdom) Alister McRae	1991	2012	78	-	-	-
(United Kingdom) Colin McRae	1987	2006	146	42	25	1995
(United Kingdom) Jimmy McRae	1976	2004	25	2	-	-
(United Kingdom) Niall McShea	1999	2009	33	-	-	-
(United Kingdom) Kris Meeke	2002	2019	106	13	5	-
(Kenya) Shekhar Mehta	1973	1987	47	11	5	-
(Slovakia) Jaroslav Melichárek	2011	2016	10	-	-	-
(Argentina) Carlos Menem Jr.	1990	1994	17	-	-	-
(Argentina) Claudio Menzie	1998	2006	14	-	-	-
(Norway) Andreas Mikkelsen	2006	2024	135	25	3	-
(Finland) Hannu Mikkola	1973	1993	124	44	18	1983
(New Zealand) Rod Millen	1977	1992	19	1	-	-
(Estonia) Jaan Mölder	2005	2008	21	-	-	-
(Ivory Coast) Michel Molinié	1982	2000	12	-	-	-
(Belgium) Amaury Molle	2015	2022	7	-	-	-
(Soviet Union) Viktor Moskovski	1980	1985	6	-	-	-
(Portugal) Joaquim Moutinho	1973	1986	8	1	1	-
(France) Michèle Mouton	1974	1986	49	9	4	-
(Italy) Sandro Munari	1973	1984	36	14	7	1977*
(Italy) Andrea Navarra	1995	2005	18	-	-	-
(Belgium) **Thierry Neuville**	2009	**Active**	181	73	22	2024
(France) Bob Neyret	1973	1981	5	2	-	-
(France) Jean-Pierre Nicolas	1973	1984	40	13	5	-
(East Germany) Horst Niebergall	1973	1977	7	-	-	-
(Estonia) Miko-Ove Niinemäe	2011	2017	8	-	-	-
(Germany) Uwe Nittel	1994	2008	34	-	-	-
(Kenya) Patrick Njiru	1984	1998	15	-	-	-
(Brazil) Paulo Nobre	2006	2012	25	-	-	-
(Russia) Evgeny Novikov	2007	2013	49	2	-	-
(Japan) Fumio Nutahara	1999	2010	37	-	-	-
(Argentina) Juan Odriozola	2000	2005	5	-	-	-
(France) **Sébastien Ogier**	2008	**Active**	204	116	67	2013, 2014, 2015, 2016, 2017, 2018, 2020, 2021, 2025
(Soviet Union) Heiki Ohu	1979	1983	16	-	-	-
(Poland) Maciej Oleksowicz	2006	2012	10	-	-	-
(Brazil) Daniel Oliveira	2009	2013	20	-	-	-
(Australia) Ed Ordynski	1989	2004	22	-	-	-
(France) Alain Oreille	1984	1995	28	2	1	-
(Portugal) Jorge Ortigão	1973	1988	10	-	-	-
(Argentina) Heriberto Ortíz	1994	2005	7	-	-	-
(Norway) Mads Østberg	2006	2021	139	18	1	-
(Finland) Jani Paasonen	1997	2005	30	-	-	-
(New Zealand) Hayden Paddon	2007	2022	83	8	1	-
(Italy) Alcide Paganelli	1973	1976	16	1	-	-
(France) Pierre Pagani	1973	1986	10	-	-	-
(France) Gilles Panizzi	1990	2006	72	14	7	-
(Greece) Ioannis Papadimitriou	1996	2005	30	-	-	-
(Switzerland) Francesco Parli	2009	2013	6	-	-	-
(Estonia) Sander Pärn	2009	2016	24	-	-	-
(Estonia) Aigar Pärs	2007	2007	6	-	-	-
(United States) Travis Pastrana	2007	2008	5	-	-	-
(Kenya) Karan Patel	2016	2016	5	-	-	-
(Australia) Scott Pedder	2001	2016	11	-	-	-
(Italy) Luca Pedersoli	1998	2012	6	-	-	-
(Argentina) Luis Pérez Companc	2001	2007	30	-	-	-
(United Kingdom) Steve Perez	2002	2009	5	-	-	-
(Canada) Jean-Paul Pérusse	1974	1979	6	-	-	-
(United Kingdom) Leon Pesticcio	2000	2005	7	-	-	-
(Italy) Raffaele Pinto	1973	1978	19	3	1	-
(France) Jean-François Piot	1973	1975	7	1	-	-
(Italy) Mario Pizzuti	2014	2015	11	-	-	-
(United Kingdom) Tony Pond	1974	1986	27	2	-	-
(Spain) Xavier Pons	2003	2014	72	-	-	-
(Estonia) Roland Poom	2018	2020	7	-	-	-
(Argentina) Gabriel Pozzo	1998	2009	47	-	-	-
(Kenya) Vic Preston Jr.	1973	1973	18	2	-	-
(Czech Republic) Martin Prokop	2005	2024	142	-	-	-
(Ukraine) Yuriy Protasov	2011	2018	46	-	-	-
(United Kingdom) Osian Pryce	2010	2017	13	-	-	-
(Spain) Jesús Puras	1991	2002	37	2	1	-
(Finland) Juuso Pykälistö	1996	2005	25	-	-	-
(Sweden) Thomas Rådström	1989	2006	39	4	-	-
(France) Jean Ragnotti	1973	1996	43	9	3	-
(Estonia) Ivar Raidam	1995	1997	5	-	-	-
(Argentina) Gabriel Raies	1984	2003	17	-	-	-
(Argentina) Juan Pablo Raies	1992	2007	11	-	-	-
(Finland) Kimi Räikkönen	2009	2011	22	-	-	-
(Finland) Matti Rantanen	2005	2012	9	-	-	-
(Jordan) Ala'a Rasheed	2013	2013	5	-	-	-
(Estonia) Martin Rauam	2007	2008	11	-	-	-
(Zimbabwe) Conrad Rautenbach	2004	2009	56	-	-	-
(United Kingdom) Pablo Raybould	1992	2001	5	-	-	-
(Argentina) Jorge Recalde	1980	2000	71	8	2	-
(Australia) Brendan Reeves	2008	2012	14	-	-	-
(Tanzania) Zully Remtulla	1973	1978	6	-	-	-
(Italy) Max Rendina	2003	2016	20	-	-	-
(Canada) Patrick Richard	2002	2003	7	-	-	-
(Germany) Christian Riedemann	2010	2015	21	-	-	-
(New Zealand) Marty Roestenburg	1988	2005	6	-	-	-
(Germany) Walter Röhrl	1973	1987	75	31	14	1980, 1982
(Sweden) Joakim Roman	1997	2023	38	-	-	-
(Portugal) Francisco Romãozinho	1973	1978	6	1	-	-
(France) **Yohan Rossel**	2014	**Active**	53	-	-	-
(France) Paul Rouby	1978	1990	10	-	-	-
(Switzerland) Philippe Roux	1982	2008	9	-	-	-
(Finland) Harri Rovanperä	1993	2006	113	15	1	-
(Finland) Kalle Rovanperä	2017	2025	75	26	17	2022, 2023
(United Kingdom) Martin Rowe	1994	2003	33	-	-	-
(Switzerland) Hanspeter Ruedin	1978	1982	5	-	-	-
(Paraguay) Gustavo Saba	2012	2018	6	-	-	-
(France) Bruno Saby	1973	1991	41	7	2	-
(Spain) Carlos Sainz	1987	2005	195	97	26	1990, 1992
(Finland) Juha Salo	1997	2016	16	-	-	-
(Finland) Timo Salonen	1974	2002	96	24	11	1985
(Portugal) Giovanni Salvi	1973	1979	5	-	-	-
(Argentina) Roberto Sánchez	1997	2005	12	-	-	-
(Sweden) Patrik Sandell	2005	2012	41	-	-	-
(France) Stéphane Sarrazin	2004	2022	23	-	-	-
(Argentina) Matías Sas	1999	2005	5	-	-	-
(Luxembourg) Gilles Schammel	2004	2008	19	-	-	-
(Germany) Armin Schwarz	1988	2005	121	7	2	-
(United Kingdom) Chris Sclater	1973	1978	11	-	-	-
(Czech Republic) Martin Semerád	2009	2011	18	-	-	-
(Greece) Jourdan Serderidis	2013	2018	24	-	-	-
(Spain) Salvador Servià	1973	1994	11	-	-	-
(Finland) Hans Sevelius	1973	1978	6	-	-	-
(Kenya) Jayant Shah	1978	1990	14	-	-	-
(Tanzania) Bert Shankland	1973	1980	7	-	-	-
(Russia) Radik Shaymiev	2007	2018	18	-	-	-
(Japan) Kenjiro Shinozuka	1976	1997	21	3	2	-
(Russia) Viktor Shtikov	1984	1993	7	-	-	-
(Kenya) Joginder Singh	1973	1980	8	2	2	-
(Malaysia) Karamjit Singh	1994	2005	33	-	-	-
(Sweden) Fredrik Skoghag	1988	1991	12	-	-	-
(Canada) Bo Skowronnek	1973	1979	5	-	-	-
(Bulgaria) Todor Slavov	2010	2010	5	-	-	-
(Kazakhstan) Arman Smailov	2010	2013	7	-	-	-
(Belgium) Patrick Snijers	1979	1998	8	1	-	-
(France) Dany Snobeck	1978	2009	10	-	-	-
(Finland) Kristian Sohlberg	2000	2014	32	-	-	-
(Spain) Dani Solà	1997	2007	39	-	-	-
(Spain) **Jan Solans**	2017	**Active**	30	-	-	-
(Spain) Nil Solans	2012	2021	33	-	-	-
(Norway) Henning Solberg	1998	2019	133	6	-	-
(Sweden) **Oliver Solberg**	2019	**Active**	61	2	2	-
(Norway) Oscar Solberg	2016	2017	7	-	-	-
(Norway) Petter Solberg	1998	2019	190	52	13	2003
(Poland) Michał Sołowow	2003	2015	17	-	-	-
(Spain) **Dani Sordo**	2003	**Active**	193	58	3	-
(Argentina) Ernesto Soto	1981	1990	13	-	-	-
(United Kingdom) Will Sparrow	1973	1976	5	-	-	-
(Poland) Maciej Stawowiak	1973	1981	10	1	-	-
(Austria) Manfred Stohl	1991	2007	126	6	-	-
(Austria) Rudi Stohl	1975	2002	61	2	-	-
(Sweden) Lars Stugemo	2016	2021	6	-	-	-
(Argentina) Raúl Sufan	1995	1997	10	-	-	-
(Finland) Teemu Suninen	2014	2023	89	3	-	-
(Argentina) Walter Suriani	1995	2004	6	-	-	-
(Lithuania) Vytautas Švedas	2006	2014	6	-	-	-
(Japan) Nobuhiro Tajima	1981	1999	19	-	-	-
(Estonia) Ott Tänak	2009	2025	176	58	22	2019
(Germany) Julius Tannert	2013	2019	18	-	-	-
(New Zealand) Mark Tapper	2001	2010	14	-	-	-
(France) Patrick Tauziac	1984	1992	9	4	1	-
(Australia) Molly Taylor	2011	2016	14	-	-	-
(New Zealand) Tony Teesdale	1979	1988	10	-	-	-
(Finland) Ville-Pertti Teuronen	2000	2003	9	-	-	-
(France) Jean-Luc Thérier	1973	1984	47	10	5	-
(Belgium) Bruno Thiry	1989	2002	75	5	-	-
(Sweden) Pontus Tidemand	2012	2020	55	-	-	-
(United Kingdom) Mark Tilbury	1994	1999	5	-	-	-
(France) Brice Tirabassi	1999	2008	24	-	-	-
(Finland) Henri Toivonen	1975	1986	41	9	3	-
(Estonia) Ken Torn	2018	2020	9	-	-	-
(Sweden) Lars-Erik Torph	1980	1989	20	4	-	-
(Argentina) Miguel Torrás	1984	2000	12	-	-	-
(Italy) Renato Travaglia	1991	2002	13	-	-	-
(Uruguay) Gustavo Trelles	1981	2002	101	1	-	-
(Czech Republic) Emil Triner	1993	1999	32	-	-	-
(Mexico) Ricardo Triviño	2002	2024	55	-	-	-
(Belgium) Pieter Tsjoen	1999	2006	13	-	-	-
(Lithuania) Eugenijus Tumalevičius	1985	1993	9	-	-	-
(Finland) Janne Tuohino	1996	2021	50	-	-	-
(Hungary) Frigyes Turán	2010	2011	10	-	-	-
(Monaco) Auguste Turiani	1975	2006	44	-	-	-
(United Kingdom) Richard Tuthill	1992	2014	7	-	-	-
(Kenya) Robin Ulyate	1973	1987	11	1	-	-
(Canada) Leo Urlichich	2014	2014	5	-	-	-
(United Kingdom) Wug Utting	1998	2009	6	-	-	-
(Spain) Egoi Éder Valdés López	2008	2010	9	-	-	-
(Netherlands) Timo van der Marel	2008	2012	13	-	-	-
(Netherlands) Mark van Eldik	2005	2010	8	-	-	-
(Netherlands) Peter van Merksteijn Jr.	2007	2012	23	-	-	-
(Netherlands) Peter van Merksteijn Sr.	2007	2012	13	-	-	-
(Finland) Ari Vatanen	1974	2003	101	27	10	1981
(Finland) Max Vatanen	2014	2018	22	-	-	-
(Norway) Ole Christian Veiby	2014	2023	50	-	-	-
(Italy) Maurizio Verini	1973	2013	33	4	-	-
(Argentina) Federico Villagra	2000	2015	55	-	-	-
(Spain) Alexander Villanueva	2000	2025	29	-	-	-
(Estonia) Robert Virves	2020	2025	30	-	-	-
(Netherlands) **Henk Vossen**	1977	**Active**	43	-	-	-
(Switzerland) Laurent Vukasovic	2013	2017	7	-	-	-
(Soviet Union) Sergey Vukovich	1977	1985	12	-	-	-
(Sweden) Björn Waldegård	1973	1992	95	35	16	1979
(Sweden) Per-Inge Walfridsson	1973	1982	9	-	-	-
(West Germany) Achim Warmbold	1973	2000	27	2	2	-
(Japan) Shunichi Washio	1989	2019	19	-	-	-
(West Germany) Erwin Weber	1985	1997	22	4	-	-
(Germany) Josef Wecker	2007	2019	11	-	-	-
(Netherlands) Hans Weijs	2006	2013	28	-	-	-
(United Kingdom) Nick West	1995	2013	5	-	-	-
(Germany) Sepp Wiegand	2011	2013	10	-	-	-
(United Kingdom) Guy Wilks	2002	2008	45	-	-	-
(South Africa) Jon Williams	2009	2009	6	-	-	-
(United Kingdom) Tom Williams	2016	2021	19	-	-	-
(United Kingdom) Malcolm Wilson	1977	1995	43	2	-	-
(United Kingdom) Matthew Wilson	2004	2017	92	-	-	-
(New Zealand) Ray Wilson	1979	1998	13	1	-	-
(Austria) Franz Wittmann	1973	1989	33	3	1	-
(United States) Jon Woodner	1979	1987	5	-	-	-
(Poland) Sobiesław Zasada	1973	1997	6	-	-	-
(Austria) Leopold Mayer	1973	1986	8	-	-	-
(Austria) Johann Fennes	1973	1981	13	-	-	-
(Austria) Helmut Doppelreiter	1973	1982	6	-	-	-
(Norway) Trine Jensen	1973	1977	9	-	-	-
(East Germany) Egon Culmbacher	1973	1976	9	1	-	-
(East Germany) Hans Ullmann	1973	1977	6	-	-	-
(East Germany) Franz Galle	1973	1976	5	-	-	-
(East Germany) Helmut Piehler	1973	1981	5	-	-	-
(Norway) Arne Garvik	1973	1988	10	-	-	-
(Finland) Fredric Donner	1973	1987	5	-	-	-
(Finland) Curt Nelskylä	1973	1979	8	-	-	-
(United Kingdom) Keith Billows	1973	1982	8	-	-	-
(United States) Eric Jones	1973	1978	5	-	-	-
(United States) James Walker	1973	1987	6	1	-	-
(United Kingdom) Brian Culcheth	1973	1979	12	-	-	-
(Bulgaria) Dimitar Iliev	2002	2010	15	-	-	-
(Chile) Luis Ignacio Rosselot	2003	2007	7	-	-	-
(San Marino) Loris Baldacci	2005	2014	17	-	-	-
(Russia) Alexander Dorosinskiy	2004	2007	6	-	-	-
(Cyprus) Spyros Pavlides	2006	2012	20	-	-	-
(Lithuania) Vilius Rožukas jun.	2006	2007	9	-	-	-
(Lithuania) Vytautas Baranauskas	2007	2008	10	-	-	
(Russia) Evgeniy Vertunov	2006	2008	18	-	-	-
(Hungary) Balázs Benik	2003	2007	7	-	-	-
(Chile) Pedro Heller	2017	2024	15	-	-	-
(Peru) Jorge Martínez Merizalde	2013	2025	9	-	-	-
(Paraguay) Diego Domínguez Jr.	2019	2025	31	-	-	-
(Chile) Jorge Martínez Fontena	2019	2024	6	-	-	-
(Paraguay) Fabrizio Zaldivar	2019	2025	44	-	-	-
(Chile) Alberto Heller	2018	2024	15	-	-	-
(Peru) Eduardo Castro	2019	2025	11	-	-	-
(Chile) Gerardo Rosselot Valenzuela	2023	2024	5	-	-	-
(Peru) Andre Martinez Merizalde	2023	2025	12	-	-	-
(Luxembourg) Grégoire Munster	2019	2025	52	-	-	-
(Chile) Emilio Fernández	2018	2023	20	-	-	-
(Bolivia) Bruno Bulacia	2022	2025	20	-	-	-
(Bolivia) Marco Bulacia	2018	2024	43	-	-	-
(Bulgaria) **Nikolay Gryazin**	2019	**Active**	64	-	-	-
(Republic of Ireland) **Josh McErlean**	2019	**Active**	42	-	-	-
(France) **Léo Rossel**	2025	**Active**	6	-	-	-
(Czech Republic) Jan Černý	2011	**Active**	20	-	-	-
(Italy) Roberto Daprà	2022	**Active**	13	-	-	-
(France) Pablo Sarrazin	2025	**Active**	5	-	-	-
(France) Raphaël Astier	2017	**Active**	14	-	-	-
(Belgium) Maxime Potty	2020	**Active**	6	-	-	-
(France) Sarah Rumeau	2025	**Active**	5	-	-	-
(France) Arthur Pelamourgues	2025	**Active**	5	-	-	-
(Japan) Hikaru Kogure	2023	**Active**	15	-	-	-
(Czech Republic) Filip Kohn	2023	**Active**	11	-	-	-
(Italy) Matteo Fontana	2023	**Active**	24	-	-	-
(France) Ghjuvanni Rossi	2021	**Active**	11	-	-	-
(France) Thibaut Poizot	2016	**Active**	7	-	-	-
(Monaco) Jean-Paul Palmero	2012	**Active**	7	-	-	-
(Latvia) Mārtiņš Sesks	2018	**Active**	23	-	-	-
(Finland) Sami Pajari	2019	**Active**	53	-	-	-
(Poland) Kajetan Kajetanowicz	2016	**Active**	51	-	-	-
(Spain) Alejandro Cachón	2021	**Active**	16	-	-	-
(Greece) Ioannis Plagos	2006	**Active**	6	-	-	-
(Greece) Efthimios Halkias	1997	**Active**	14	-	-	-
(Greece) Epaminondas Karanikolas	2021	**Active**	5	-	-	-
(Greece) Saffas Lefkaditis	2021	**Active**	5	-	-	-
(Greece) George Vasilakis	2018	**Active**	13	-	-	-
(Cyprus) Petros Panteli	2001	**Active**	7	-	-	-
(Croatia) Slaven Šekuljica	2023	**Active**	12	-	-	-
(Kazakhstan) Petr Borodin	2023	2024	7	-	-	-
(Romania) Norbert Maior	2024	2024	5	-	-	-
(Peru) José Caparó	2024	2024	5	-	-	-
(Austria) Johannes Keferböck	2015	2023	10	-	-	-
(Hungary) László Zoltán	2020	2024	16	-	-	-
(Belgium) Pieter Jan Michel Cracco	2013	2022	7	-	-	-
(Republic of Ireland) William Creighton	2017	**Active**	26	-	-	-
* - Note: 1977 and 1978 driver championships were not part of the WRC, but awarded as the FIA Cup for Rally Drivers.

== See also ==
- List of female World Rally Championship drivers
- List of World Rally Championship co-drivers
