= Consani =

Consani is an Italian surname. Notable people with the surname include:

- Alessio Consani, bassist for Italian progressive/power metal band Eldritch
- Alex Consani (born 2003), American model and influencer
- Andy Consani (born 2010), French racing driver
- Caterina Consani (born 1963), Italian mathematician
- Robert Consani (born 1982) French rally and racing driver
- Sergio Consani, first husband of American actress and singer Char Fontane
- Stéphane Consani, French European Rally Championship driver
- Thaigo Consani, contestant in Brazilian reality TV show Are You the One? Brasil
- Vincenzo Consani (1818–1888), Italian sculptor
