= Lyndon Sims =

Welsh rally driver

- Nationality: (Wales) Welsh
- Born: Lyndon Oliver Sims; 20 January 1917 Treharris, Glamorgan
- Died: April 1999 (aged 82) Monmouth, Monmouthshire

Lyndon Oliver Sims (20 January 1917 – April 1999) was a Welsh rally driver and winner of the 6th RAC Rally in 1956. He also served in the Royal Air Force.

== Career ==
During the 1950s, Sims competed in some European Rally Championship events, including the Monte Carlo Rally during this decade.

Perhaps Sims' most recognisable achievement came in 1956, where he won the 6th RAC Rally driving an Aston Martin DB2. That same year, Sims finished 65th in the Monte Carlo Rally driving a Riley Pathfinder.

== Personal life ==
Sims married Magan P. Shott in 1940 in Crickhowell, Breconshire. His son, Geoffrey was born in spring 1948 followed by Christopher and Anthony.
