= Patricia Ozanne =

English rally driver

Patricia "Tish" Ozanne
- Born: 31 July 1923; Guernsey, Channel Islands
- Died: 11 February 2009 (aged 85); Newmarket, Suffolk
- Occupation: Rally driver

Patricia Ozanne (31 July 1923 - 11 February 2009) was a Guernsey-born English rally driver who competed from 1953 to 1973. She won the ladies' award at the 1961 London Rally and at the 1970 Sherry Rally in Spain.

== Rally results ==
Year	Rally	Car	Co-driver	Result
1970	Daily Mirror London-Mexico World Cup Rally	Austin Maxi	Bronwyn Burrell/Katrina Kerridge	DNF
1970	Rally Monte Carlo	BMC Mini Cooper	Pat Wright	DNF
1971	Acropolis Rally	BMC Mini Cooper	Pat Wright	DNF
