= Jonathan Joannides =

Personal information
- Nationality: (United Kingdom) British
- Born: 27 January 1958 (age 68); Southport, Lancashire, United Kingdom

World Rally Championship record
- Years active: 1985, 1988, 1990-1995
- Teams: Privateer
- Rallies: 8 (including 1 as co-driver)
- Championships: 0
- Rally wins: 0
- Podiums: 0
- Stage wins: 0
- Total points: 0
- First rally: 1985 RAC Rally
- Last rally: 1995 RAC Rally

Jonathan "Jon" Richard Joannides (born 27 January 1958) is a former rally driver from Britain.

== Career ==
He has raced at his local Rally GB seven times, and has been a co-driver once.

He was also a regular competitor in European Rally Championship competition, and was the Raliul Romaniei third-place finisher in 1994.
