= John Haugland =

Norwegian rally driver (born 1946)

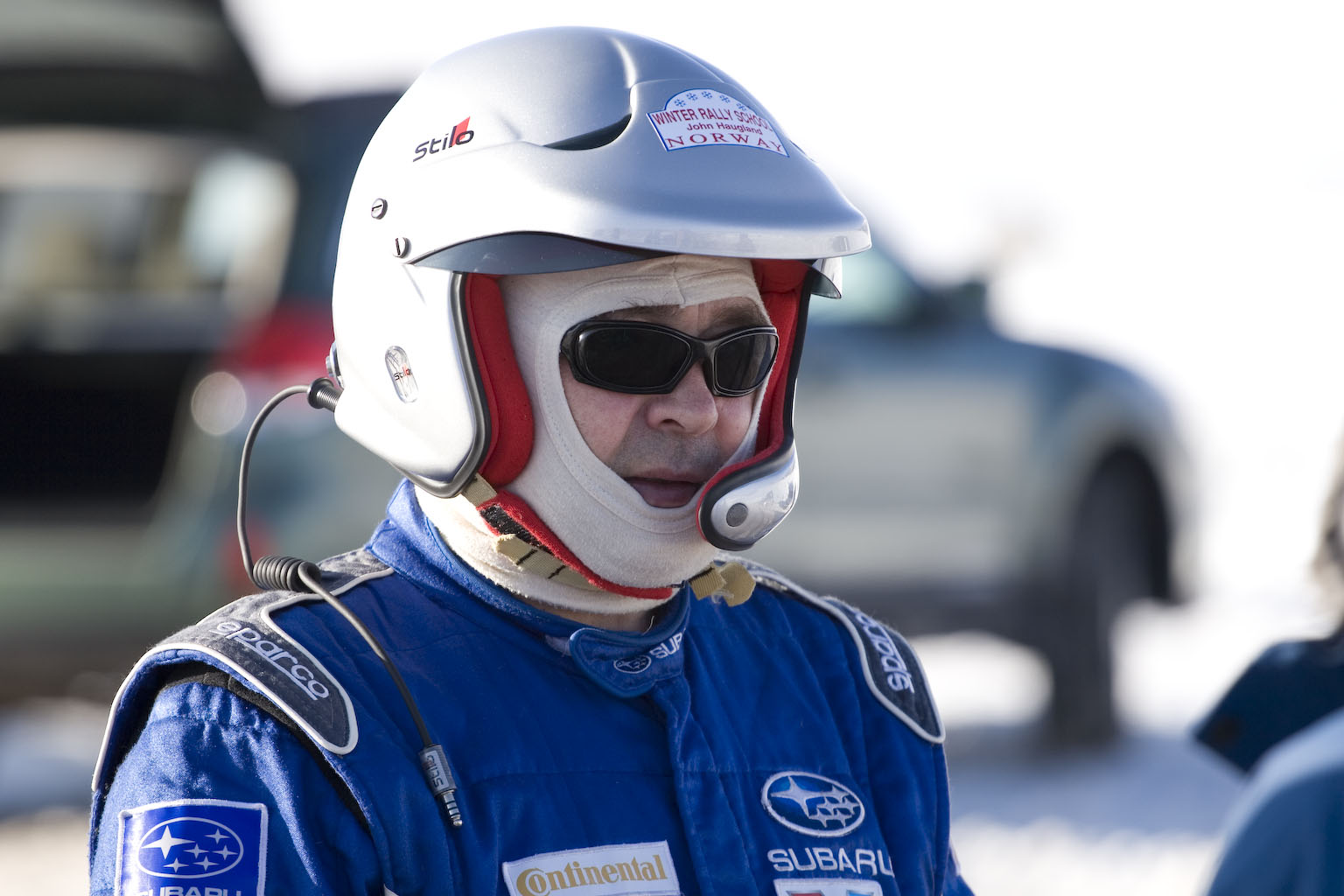

Personal information
- Nationality: (Norway) Norwegian
- Full name: John Didrik Haugland
- Born: 23 September 1946 (age 80); Stavanger, Norway

World Rally Championship record
- Years active: 1973–1990
- Co-driver: (Norway) Arild Antonsen (Norway) Asbjørn Fløene (United Kingdom) Fred Gallagher (Norway) Per Odvar Nyborg (Sweden) Bruno Berglund (United Kingdom) Rupert Saunders (United Kingdom) Martin Holmes (Sweden) Jan-Olof Bohlin (United Kingdom) Ian Grindrod (Norway) Petter Vegel (West Germany) Monika Eckardt
- Teams: Škoda
- Rallies: 28
- Championships: 0
- Podiums: 0
- Stage wins: 0
- Total points: 3
- First rally: 1973 Monte Carlo Rally
- Last rally: 1990 RAC Rally

John Didrik Haugland (born 23 September 1946 in Stavanger) is a Norwegian former rally driver. He competed in 27 world rally championship events, more often than not at the wheel of a Škoda. He had four Top 10 finishes in his career. Haugland debuted in his first rally in 1965, and had over 100 class wins primarily in the 1970s and 1980s.

He worked for the Norwegian Škoda importer as a teenager and they helped him in his rally career. His first race as an official Škoda driver came in 1968. Haugland raced a few times for other, bigger teams, but preferred the camaraderie and open nature of the little Škoda team. Haugland also owned a Škoda dealership outside of Oslo.

Haugland is educated as a car technician and has gained much experience and skill in developing racing cars.

He currently works for a number of rally teams developing their cars as well as running a rally school for young drivers. Drivers who have attended his rally school include Petter Solberg, Richard Burns, Alister McRae, Martin Rowe, Mark Higgins, Guy Wilks and Luke Pinder.
