= Wittmann =

Wittmann is a German surname. Notable people with the surname include:

- August Wittmann (1895–1977), German general during World War II
- Dola Ben-Yehuda Wittmann (1902–2005), linguist of Hebrew
- Franz Wittmann (physicist) (1869–1932), Hungarian electrician and physicist
- Franz Wittmann, Sr. (1950), Austrian rally driver
- Franz Wittmann, Jr. (born 1983), Austrian rally driver
- Fritz Wittmann (1933–2018), German politician
- Heinz-Günter Wittmann (1927–1990), German biochemist
- Heinz Wittmann (born 1943), German football player
- Henri (Hirsch) Wittmann (born 1937), Quebec linguist
- Jürgen Wittmann (born 1966), German football coach
- Krisztián Wittmann (born 1985), Hungarian basketball player
- Marco Wittmann (born 1989), German professional racing driver
- Marshall Wittmann, American pundit, author, and sometime political activist
- Mechthilde Wittmann (born 1967), German politician
- Michael Wittmann (1914–1944), World War II German tank commander
- Walter Wittmann (1948–2020), Austrian chess master
- Werner W. Wittmann (born 1944), German psychologist, evaluation researcher and research methodologist

== See also ==
- Wittmann, Arizona, a census-designated place in Arizona, United States
- Wittman
- Witman, a hamlet in the Netherlands.
- Whitman (disambiguation)
- Wittemann_brothers
- Wittemann-Lewis
- Witteman-Lewis XNBL-1
