= Walt Whitman (disambiguation) =

Walt Whitman (1819–1892) was an American poet, essayist and journalist.

Walt Whitman may also refer to:

- Walt Whitman (actor) (1859–1928), American stage and silent film actor
- Walt Whitman (Davidson), a 1939 statue by Jo Davidson
- Walt Whitman Bridge, a bridge that spans the Delaware River
- Walt Whitman High School (Bethesda, Maryland)
- Walt Whitman High School, South Huntington, a high school in Huntington Station, New York
- Walt Whitman Shops, a shopping mall in Huntington Station, New York

== See also ==
- Walt Whitman Archive
- Walt Whitman and Abraham Lincoln
- Walt Whitman's lectures on Abraham Lincoln
- Walt Whitman Houses
- Walt Whitman Birthplace State Historic Site, a site in Huntington, New York
- Walt Whitman House, a residence of Walt Whitman in New Jersey
- Walt Whitman Award, an annual award conferred by the Academy of American Poets
- Walt Whitman Rostow (1916–2003), United States economist and political theorist
- Walter White (disambiguation)
- Whitman (disambiguation)
- Whitman (surname)
