= Aviation Hall of Fame and Museum of New Jersey =

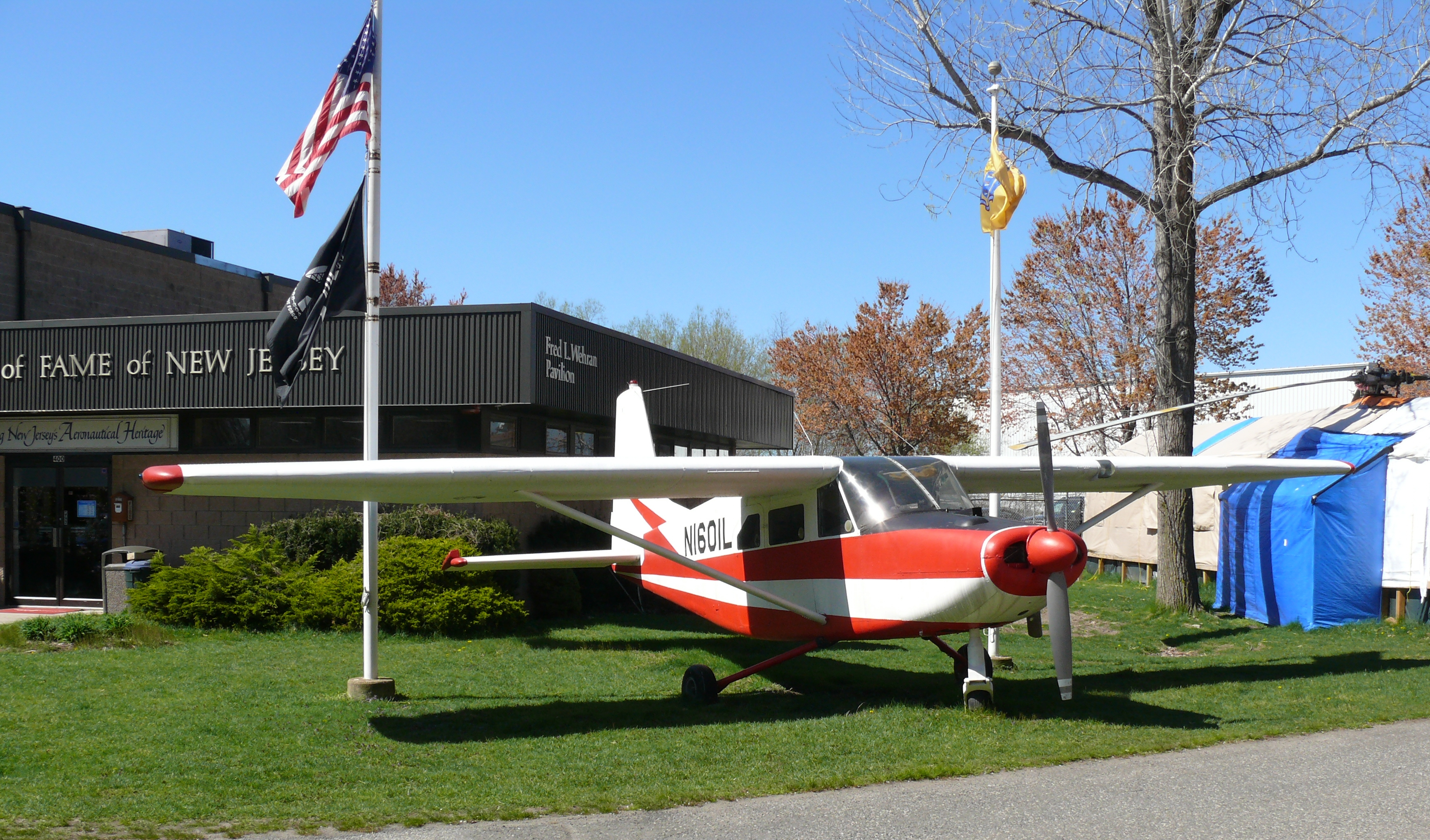
- Lockheed L-402 Bushmaster on display in front of the museum

- Location within New Jersey
- Established: 1972
- Location: Teterboro, New Jersey
- Coordinates: 40.8524°N 74.0554°W
- Type: Aviation museum
- Founders: Pat Reilly & Donald G. Borg
- Executive director: Ralph Villecca Sr.
- Website: www.njahof.org

The Aviation Hall of Fame & Museum of New Jersey was founded in 1972 and preserves New Jersey's aviation and space heritage. The museum displays historic aircraft, space equipment, artifacts, photographs, art and an aircraft model collection. The library has more than 4,000 volumes and a collection of aviation video. It is located at Teterboro Airport, the oldest operating airport in the Tri-State Region, at 400 Fred Wehran Drive, Teterboro, New Jersey.

== History ==
The museum was founded in 1972 by Pat Reilly and Donald G. Borg. Initially located in a radio tower at Teterboro Airport, it moved to a nearby building in 1985, and again in 1997 to a much larger facility.

== Aircraft on display ==
- Bell 47
- Bell AH-1 Cobra
- Grumman OV-1 Mohawk
- Lockheed L-402 Bushmaster
- Martin 2-0-2
- Sikorsky HH-52 Seaguard
- The flight deck and first few rows of seats from a Convair 880

== Honorees ==
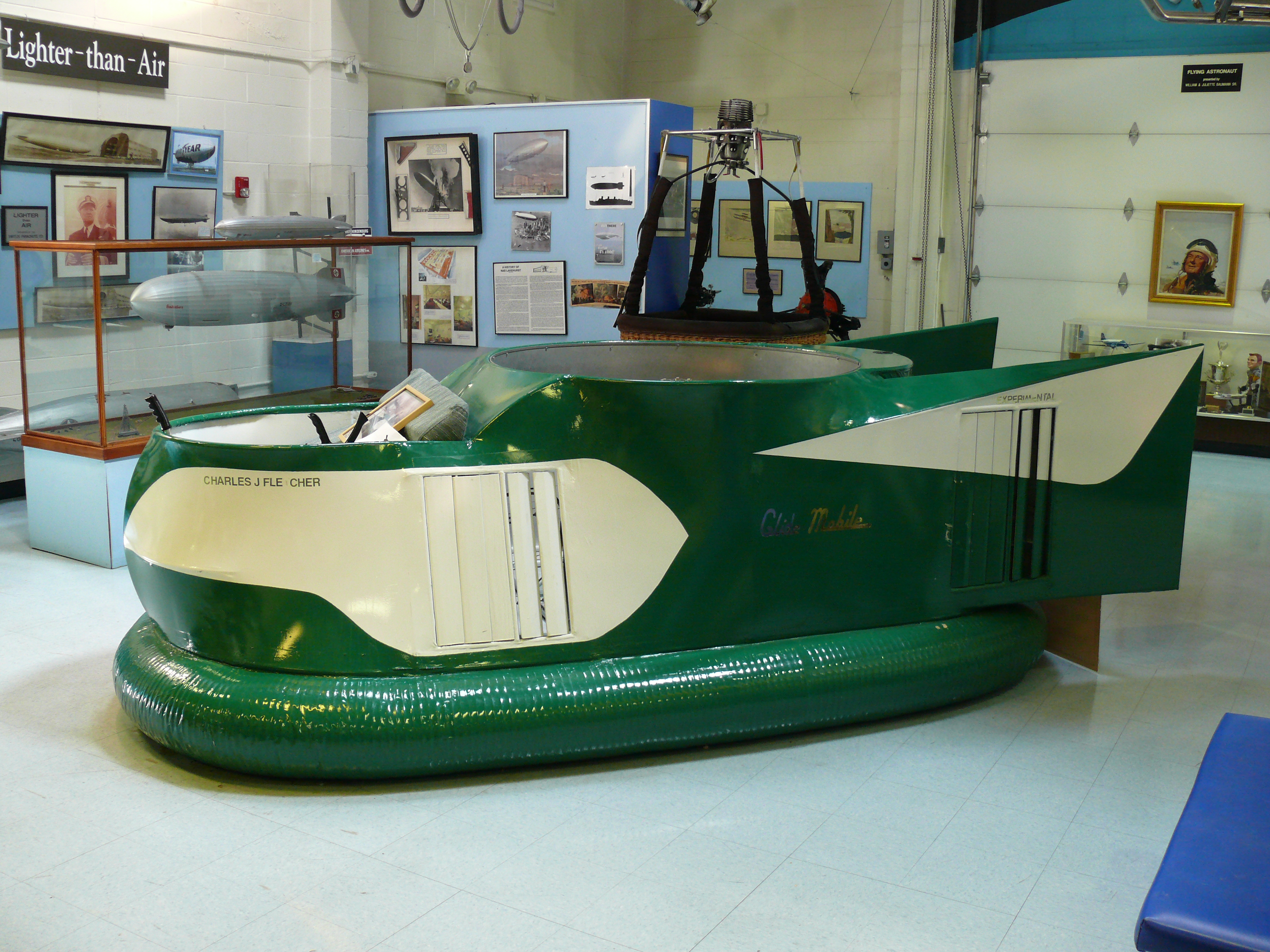
GlideMobile inside the museum

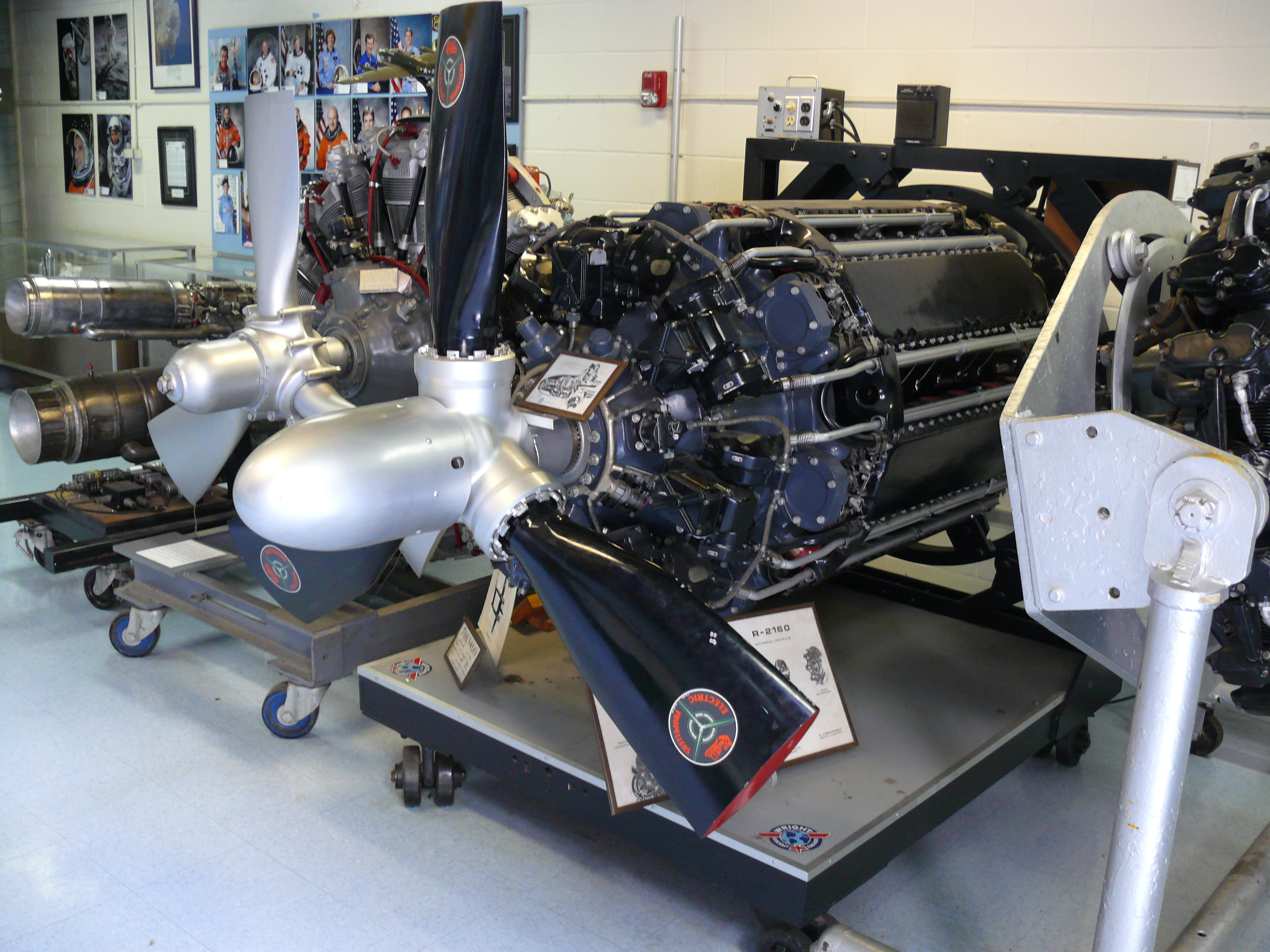
Wright R-2160 Tornado inside the museum

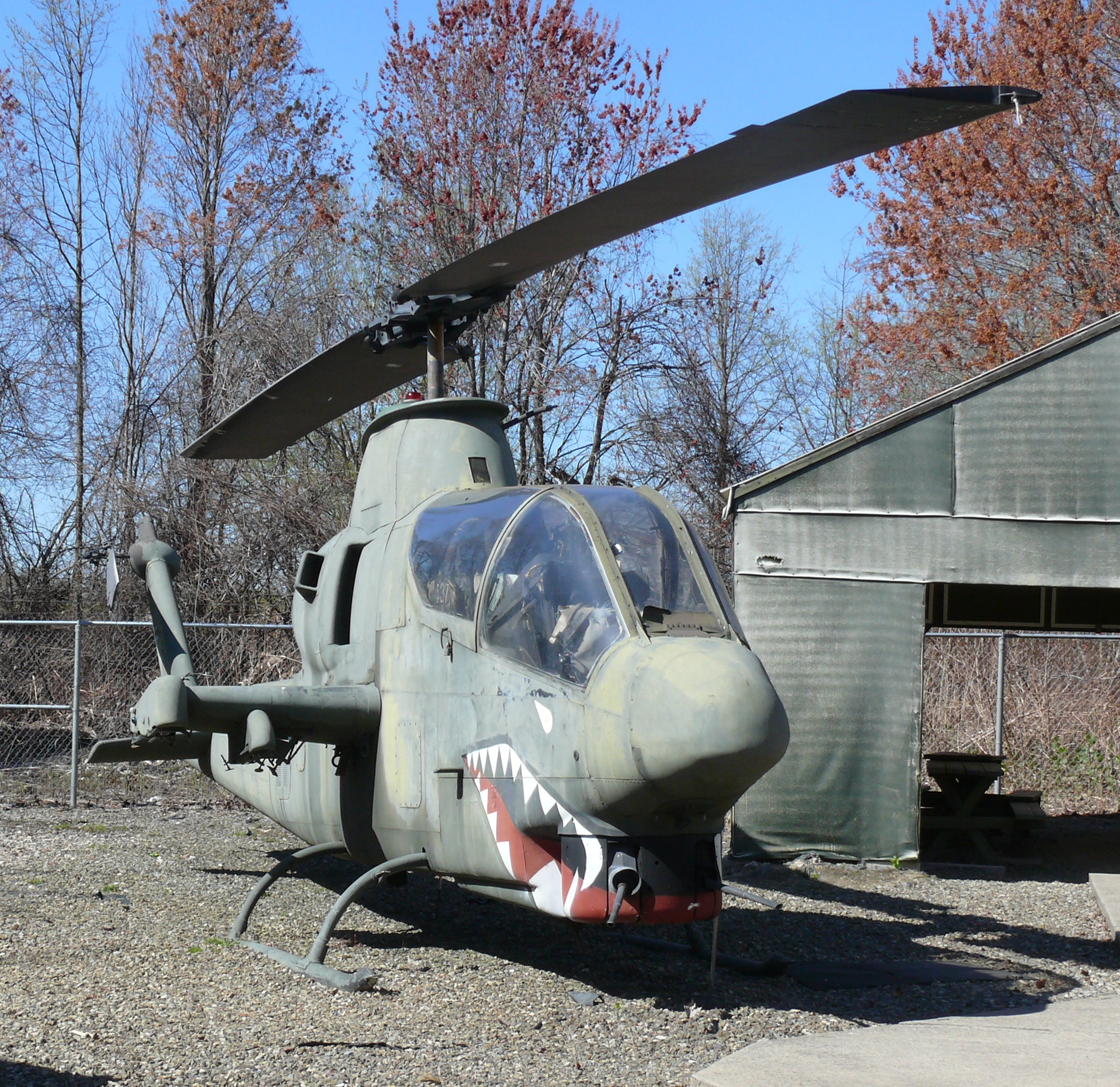
Bell AH-1 Cobra on display

Name	Year of induction
Bert Acosta	1976
Edwin Eugene Aldrin, Jr.	1980
Edwin Eugene Aldrin, Sr.	1990
Solomon Andrews	1980
Michael Bachik Jr.	2004
Bernt Balchen	1975
Ralph S. Barnaby	1981
Samuel C. Barnitt	1977
Floyd Bennett	1973
Jean Pierre Blanchard	1993
Frederick W. Bohlander	1974
Boland brothers	1980
Donald G. Borg	1974
Kay A. Brick	1978
Arthur Raymond Brooks	1980
Robert Nietzel Buck	1981
Vincent Justus Burnelli	1996
Richard Evelyn Byrd	1998
Benjamin R. Cascio	2000
Frederick Walker Castle	1988
Silvio Cavalier	1987
Clarence Duncan Chamberlin	1973
Timothy A. Chopp	2013
Robert Joseph Collier	1984
William J. Conrad	1990
Robert L. Copsey	1981
Richard C. Cosgrave	2005
Selma Cronan	1994
Harold Curtis	1984
Charles Healy Day	1981
Chester J. Decker	1985
Jules Decrescendo	1983
George DeGarmo	1976
Richard C. Dehmel	1991
William Diehl	1973
Anthony Distefano	2005
Charles F. Durant	1981
Amelia Earhart	1973
Jack Elliott	1986
Henyy J. Esposito	1986
Earl W. Estelle	2005
Arlene B. Feldman	2002
Fred Feldman	2002
Herbert O. Fisher	1983
Charles Joseph Fletcher	1989
Anthony Fokker	1974
Malcolm S. Forbes	1985
Albert E. Forsythe	1985
Paul E. Garber	1987
Ivan Gates	1976
Henry Geleski	1978
Francis R. Gerard	1983
Richard F. Gills	2005
Arthur Godfrey	1976
Robert R. Golem	1993
Edward Gorski	1973
Julia Gorski	1978
John M. Habermann	1991
William Halsey, Jr.	1988
Harry Hamlen	2002
Terry Jonathan Hart	1999
William A. Hartig	1974
Walter M. Hartung	1990
Bernice Falk Haydu	2000
O. R. Herbert	1975
George Hicha	1979
Aline Rhonie Hofheimer	2010
James Holahan	1994
William A. Hughes	1983
Michael J. Jackson	1994
Robert E. Johnson	1991
Charles S. Jones	1984
Herbert D. Kelleher	2000
Jo Kotula	1999
Cornelius J. Kraissl	1989
Aaron Krantz	1973
Frederick Kuhnert	1990
Roy LaGrone	2001
Phillip J. Landi	1986
Sander Lawrance	1994
Oliver Colin LeBoutillier	2002
Anne Morrow Lindbergh	1997
Charles A. Lindbergh	1973
Leo Loudenslager	1982
Donald Arthur Luscombe	2006
Thomas Buchanan McGuire, Jr.	1982
Edward P. McNeff	2009
George Meade	2001
Thomas A. Murchio	1983
Ruth Rowland Nichols	1988
R.B.C. Noorduyn	1978
Harry A. Nordheim	1988
John W. Olcott	1998
Thomas J. O'Malley	1996
Clyde Pangborn	1973
John S. Penn, Sr.	1998
William J. Picune	1979
James O. Plinton, Jr.	2006
Stephen Pope	2019
Louis G. Ranley	1977
Louis T. Reichers	1989
H. V. Pat Reilly	1993
William E. Rhode	1984
Thomas W. Robertson	1983
Ben B. Rock	1977
Charles Emery Rosendahl	1980
Royal French Ryder	1979
Barry Schiff	2002
Walter M. Schirra	1982
Issac Schlossbach	2001
Oliver George Simmons	1987
Dean C. Smith	1986
Thor Solberg	1985
Calvin J. Spann	2006
Donald J. Strait	1989
Paul G. Styger	1995
Kathryn Dwyer Sullivan	1987
Richard Switlik, Sr.	1996
Stanley Switlik	1989
John E. Thomson	1979
Juan Terry Trippe	1975
Kenneth R. Unger	1981
David A. Van Dyke	1995
George Augustus Vaughn, Jr.	2006
George Walker	1991
Kenneth A. Walsh	1997
Neville E. Watson	1993
Jack O. Webster	1974
Fred L. Wehran	1973
Charles West	1977
Lowell E. White	2006
Russell R. White	1998
Roger O. Williams	1975
Gill Robb Wilson	1980
Hugh Dennis Wisely	1995
Wittemann brothers	1973
James Hart Wyld	1997

Aviation timeline for New Jersey

- 1793 French balloonist Jean-Pierre Blanchard ascended from Philadelphia, flew across the Delaware River and landed in Deptford Township, New Jersey. The Western Hemisphere's first flight took 45 minutes and covered 15 miles on January 9.
- 1830 Charles Durant of Jersey City, New Jersey became the first American balloonist to fly.
- 1863 Solomon Andrews (balloonist) of Perth Amboy, New Jersey constructed and flew the first American dirigible.
- 1909 The Boland brothers of Rahway, New Jersey built and flew New Jersey's first fixed-wing aircraft. They were also the first to fly in South America.
- 1912 Oliver G. Simmons in a Wright Flyer carried the first official sack of mail across the Raritan Bay from South Amboy to Perth Amboy.
- 1918 Five New Jersey combat pilots became World War I flying aces.
- 1921 The world's largest hangar and America's first dirigible, the USS Shenandoah (ZR-1), were built in Lakehurst, New Jersey.
- 1922 The world's largest airplane, the Barling Bomber, was constructed at Teterboro Airport by the Wittemann brothers.
- 1923 Wright aeronautical air-cooled Whirlwind engines, built in Princeton, New Jersey.
- 1925 Hadley Field in South Plainfield, New Jersey was established as an airmail hub.
- 1926 Teterboro-built Fokker trimotor powered by a Whirlwind engines was the first to fly over the North Pole with Richard Byrd and Floyd Bennett at the controls.
- 1927 Charles Lindbergh flew solo across the Atlantic in the Spirit of St. Louis powered by a Whirlwind engine. Two weeks later, Clarence Chamberlin in a Wright-Bellanca built in Princeton, New Jersey flew to Germany with a Whirlwind engine. A month later, Richard Byrd used a Whirlwind engine to fly to France.
- 1928 Newark Airport opened.
- 1929 William Conrad (New Jersey) at Newark Airport was America's first air traffic controller.
- 1930 Fokker build's the world's largest passenger plane, a Fokker F.32 at Teterboro Airport.
- 1930 Eddie August Schneider of Jersey City, New Jersey established the transcontinental airspeed record for people under 18 years of age.
- 1932 Amelia Earhart prepares for her solo transatlantic flight at Teterboro Airport
- 1933 Teaneck, New Jersey established the first high school aviation course in the nation.
- 1933 The Navy dirigible USS Akron (ZRS-4) crashes in the Atlantic Ocean off Barnegat, New Jersey.
- 1936 Chester Decker of Glen Rock, New Jersey becomes the National Soaring Champion. He won the title again in 1939.
- 1937 Hindenburg ignites at Lakehurst Naval Air Station.
- 1941 Civil Air Patrol is founded in New Jersey by Gill Robb Wilson.
- 1942-1945 General Motors’ Eastern Aircraft Division built 13,500 Grumman fighter planes at Linden and Trenton plants. The Curtiss-Wright Corporation built 281,164 engines and 146,468 electric propellers in plants in six north Jersey locations.
- 1945 Major Thomas McGuire of Ridgewood, New Jersey became America's second leading flying ace with 38 enemy kills.
- 1945 General Frederick Castle of Mountain Lakes, New Jersey 1st Lt. Kenneth Walsh of Jersey City and McGuire were recipients of the Medal of Honor.
- 1947 Reaction Motors of Denville, New Jersey developed the rocket engine for the Bell X-1
- 1949 Bill Odom flew a single-engine Beach Bonanza non-stop from Hawaii to Teterboro.
- 1953 Charles J. Fletcher of Sussex, New Jersey invents and flies the world's first hovercraft.
- 1968 Walter M. Schirra of Oradell, New Jersey becomes the only astronaut to fly in all three spacecraft. The Mercury, Gemini and Apollo.
- 1969 Edwin Aldrin of Montclair, New Jersey was the first astronaut to land a vehicle on the Moon, and the second person to walk on the Moon.
- 1973 Malcolm Forbes of Far Hills, New Jersey made the first coast-to-coast flight in a hot air balloon.
- 1980 Leo Loudenslager, of Sussex, New Jersey won the World Aerobatic championship. Throughout his career he won seven National Aerobatic championships.
- 1984 Astronaut Kathryn Dwyer Sullivan, of Paterson, New Jersey was the first woman to walk in space.
- 1991 During Desert Storm, Major Marie Rossi of Oradell, New Jersey was the first American woman to fly in combat.
- 1991 Rick Trader flew his home-built Ultralight aircraft 15,000 miles from coast to coast and north to Alaska before returning to New Jersey.
- 1994 Kenneth Johnson (pilot) and Larry Cioppi of Ringoes, New Jersey flew around the world in their Glasair monoplane.

== See also ==
- List of aviation awards
- List of aerospace museums
- North American aviation halls of fame
