= Whiteman =

Whiteman may refer to:

== Australia ==
- Whiteman, Western Australia
  - Whiteman Park, in the above suburb

== United States ==
- Whiteman Airport, Los Angeles
- Whiteman Air Force Base, Missouri
- Whiteman Fork, a stream in West Virginia

== Other ==
- Whiteman (surname)

== See also ==
- White man (disambiguation)
- Whitman (disambiguation)
- Wightman (disambiguation)
- Weightman (disambiguation)
