= Wightman =

Wightman may refer to:

- Andrew Wightman (born 1967), Australian water polo player
- Andy Wightman (born 1963), Scottish politician and writer
- Arthur Wightman (1922–2013), American theoretical physicist
- Brian Wightman (politician) (born 1976), Australian politician
- Bruce Wightman (1925–2009), actor who co-founded the Dracula Society in London in 1973
- Cathryn Wightman (born 1978), Australian synchronized swimmer
- Edith Wightman (1938–1983), British historian and archaeologist
- Edward Wightman (1566–1612), English Baptist, last person to be burnt for heresy in England.
- Glenn Wightman (born 1961), Australian ethnobotanist
- Hazel Hotchkiss Wightman (1886–1974), American tennis player
- Jake Wightman (born 1994), British athlete
- John Wightman (1930–2017), American lawyer and politician
- John Wightman of Mauldslie, (c.1670-1740), Scottish merchant, Lord Provost of Edinburgh
- Joseph Wightman (general) (c.1665-1722), a British soldier of the eighteenth century
- Julia Parker Wightman (1909–1994), American bibliophile and book collector
- Louise Wightman (Lucy) (born 1959), American bodybuilder and dancer
- Mark Wightman (born 1947), British chemist
- Ralph Wightman (1901–1971), British agriculturalist and broadcaster
- Reginald Wightman (1899–1981), Canadian politician
- Robert Wightman (born 1952), American actor
- Thomas Wightman (1811–1888), American painter
- Bishop William May Wightman (1808–1882), American educator and clergyman

== Places ==
- Wightman, Iowa, United States
- Wightman, Virginia, United States
- Wightmans Grove, Ohio, United States

== Other uses ==
- Wightman axioms in quantum field theory, named after Arthur Wightman
- Wightman Cup, a former tennis competition between UK and U.S.A. named after Hazel Hotchkiss Wightman

== See also ==
- Gairdner Foundation Wightman Award
- Whiteman (disambiguation)
- Weightman
- Wigman
