= Frank Whitman =

Frank Whitman may refer to:

- Frank Whitman (baseball), Major League Baseball player
- Frank Perkins Whitman, American physicist
- Frank M. Whitman, American Union Army soldier and Medal of Honor recipient
