= Whitman (surname) =

The surname Whitman may refer to:

- Albery Allson Whitman (1851–1901), African-American poet, minister and orator
- Bernard Whitman (fl. 1980s–2020s), Democratic strategist and pollster
- Bertha Yerex Whitman (1892–1984), American architect
- Brian Whitman (born 1972), American comedian and talk show host on 97.1 KLSX in Los Angeles
- Charles Whitman (1941–1966), American marine and spree killer who perpetrated the 1966 University of Texas tower shooting
- Charles Huntington Whitman (1873–1937), English professor
- Charles Otis Whitman (1842–1910), American zoologist
- Charles Seymour Whitman (1868–1947), American judge and Governor of New York
- Christine Todd Whitman (born 1946), former New Jersey Governor, former head of the EPA
- Dane Whitman, fictional character from Marvel Comics
- Debra Whitman, fictional character from Spider-Man
- Edmund Burke Whitman (1812–1883), quartermaster during the American Civil War.
- Frank Perkins Whitman (1853–1919), American physicist
- Fred Whitman (actor) (1887–1945), American actor of the silent film era
- Gayne Whitman (1890–1958), American actor
- George Whitman (1913–2011), Shakespeare and Company proprietor
- Kari Whitman (born 1964), American model and actress Kari Kennell
- Keith Fullerton Whitman (born 1973), American electronic musician
- James Whitman (fl. 1980s–2020s), American lawyer
- Joe Whitman (born 2001), American baseball player
- Lemuel Whitman (1780–1841), American politician
- Mae Whitman (born 1988), American actress
- Malcolm Whitman (1877–1932), American tennis player
- Marcus Whitman (1802–1847), American physician and missionary, killed in the Whitman massacre
- Marina von Neumann Whitman (1935–2025), American economist, writer and automobile executive
- Martin J. Whitman (1924–2018), American investment advisor
- Meg Whitman (born 1956), president and CEO of eBay
- Narcissa Whitman (1808–1847), American missionary in the Oregon Country
- Richard G. Whitman (born 1965), British academic
- Robert Whitman (1935–2024), American artist
- Robert Shaw Sturgis Whitman (1915–2010), American Episcopal priest
- Royal Emerson Whitman (1811–1913), American army officer
- Sarah Helen Power Whitman (1803–1878), American poet, essayist, transcendentalist, Spiritualist
- Sarah W. Whitman (1842–1904), artist
- Slim Whitman (1923–2013), American country singer
- Stuart Whitman (1928–2020), American actor
- Sylvia Palacios Whitman (born 1941), Chilean-American artist, wife of Robert Whitman
- Walt Whitman (1819–1892), American poet and humanist
- William Francis Whitman Jr. (1914–2007), horticulturist
- Whitman Sisters, African-American vaudeville singing group
  - Mabel (1880–1942)
  - Essie (1882–1963)
  - Alberta (1887–1964)
  - Alice (1900–1968)

== See also ==
- Whitman (disambiguation)
- Whiteman (disambiguation)
- Wittmann
