= Charles Joseph Fletcher =

American inventor and company owner

Charles J. Fletcher
- Born: Charles Joseph Fletcher; December 21, 1922; Franklin, New Jersey, U.S.
- Died: April 20, 2011 (aged 88); Saint Clare's Hospital at Boonton Township; Boonton, New Jersey, U.S.
- Citizenship: United States
- Education: New York University, B.S. 1950
- Occupation: Aeronautical Engineering
- Known for: Hovercraft

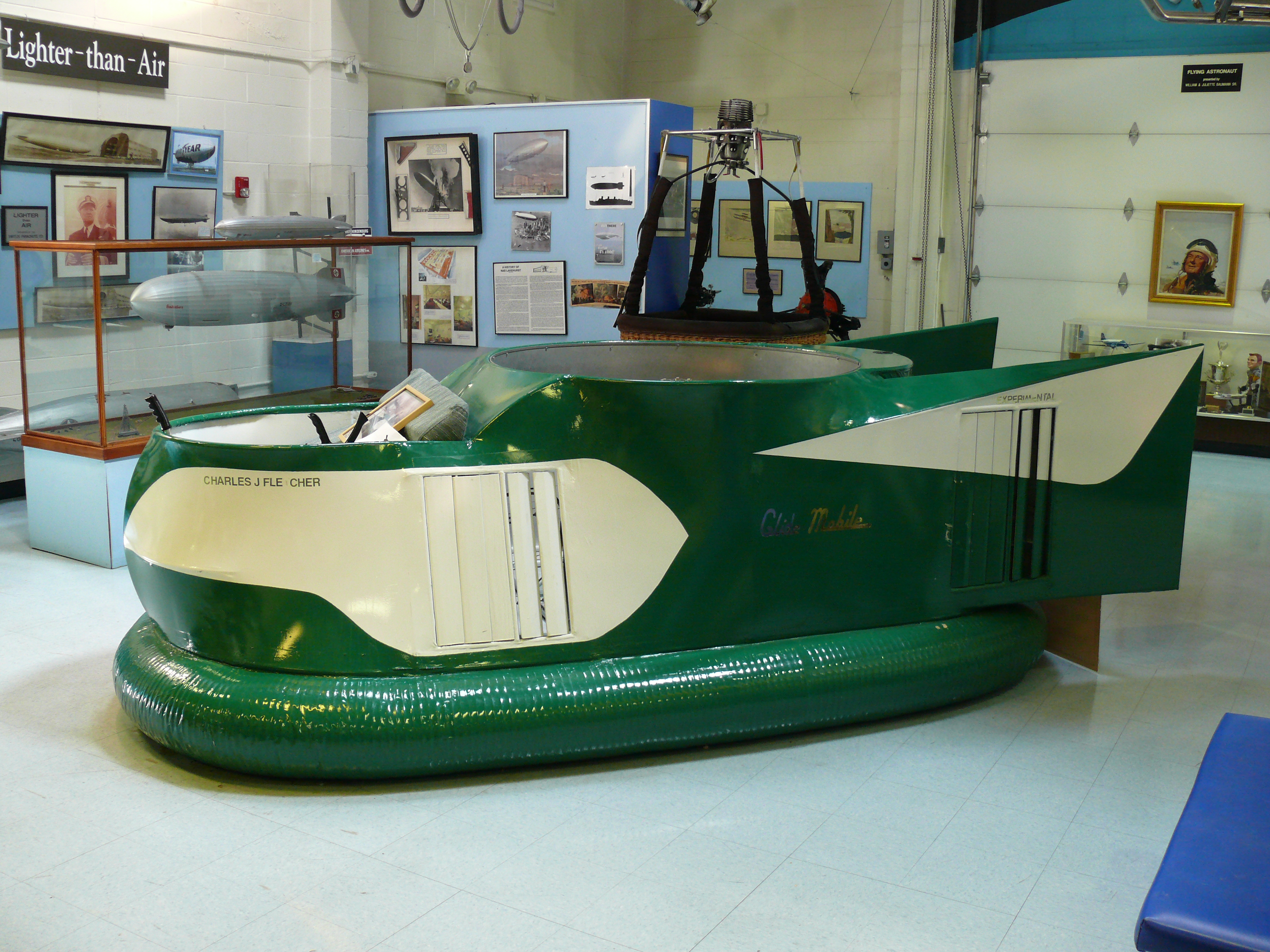
One of Fletcher's inventions: the Glidemobile, arguably the world's first hovercraft, in the Aviation Hall of Fame and Museum of New Jersey.

Charles Joseph Fletcher (December 21, 1922 – April 20, 2011) was an American inventor and the owner and chief executive of an aeronautical equipment manufacturing and engineering company, Technology General Corporation, in Franklin, New Jersey. While a naval aviator he came up with the idea of the "Glidemobile", a vehicle using air for support. This was not made public until used in defence in a patent claim from British manufacturers of hovercraft, Fletcher holds over seventy patents.

== Biography ==
He was born on December 21, 1922, to Horace Fletcher and Florence Romyns. He served as a Lieutenant Commander with the United States Navy during World War II and the Korean War. Fletcher earned a Bachelor of Science degree in Aeronautical Engineering from New York University in 1950.

He was the president of Technology General Corporation, a small ($2 million annual revenue) manufacturer of drawn metal products, spray coating systems, power mixers, and commercial ice crushing equipment. Fletcher penned his autobiography, Quest for Survival, in 2002.

A contributor to the X-15 rocket, Fletcher also worked on the test version of the Apollo Lunar Module, and holds seventeen aeronautical patents on vertical lift and rocket engines. Fletcher was inducted into the Aviation Hall of Fame of New Jersey in 1992 and the New Jersey Inventors Hall of Fame in 1993.

A resident of Fredon Township, New Jersey, he died on April 20, 2011, at Saint Clare's Hospital at Boonton Township in Boonton, New Jersey, at 88.

== Publication ==
- Fletcher, Charles Joseph (2002). Quest For Survival.
