= Wittman =

Wittman is a surname. Notable people with the surname include:

- Baldy Wittman (born c. 1871), professional football player for the Massillon Tigers
- Brian Wittman, American musical instrument maker, inventor of the xaphoon
- Carl Wittman (1943–1986), member of the national council of Students for a Democratic Society and activist for LGBT rights
- Chris Wittman (born 1965), former Australian rules footballer
- Don Wittman (1936–2008), Canadian sportscaster
- Georg Michael Wittman (1760–1833), German Catholic bishop-elect
- George Wittman (1857–1950), San Francisco Police chief of police
- Greg Wittman (born 1947), American professional basketball player
- Karl F. Wittman (1892-1981), American evangelist and composer
- Patrizius Wittman (1818–1883), Catholic journalist
- Randy Wittman (born 1959), American professional basketball player and coach
- Robert J. "Rob" Wittman (born 1959), U.S. Representative for Virginia's 1st congressional district
- Robert K. "Bob" Wittman (born 1955), FBI special agent, art-crime investigator
- Ryan Wittman (born 1987), American basketball player for the Fort Wayne Mad Ants
- Scott Wittman (born 1955), American director, lyricist, and writer
- Stan Wittman (1901–1994), Australian rules footballer for Melbourne
- Steve Wittman (1904–1995), American aviator and airplane designer
- Therese Wittman (1869-1942), French composer
- Tim Wittman (born 1963), American soccer player, currently assistant coach with the Johns Hopkins University women's soccer team
- Trevor Wittman (born 1974), American boxing and MMA trainer
- Walter Wittman, American newspaper editor and politician

== See also ==
- Wittman, Maryland, an unincorporated community in Maryland, United States
- Wittmann
- Whitman (disambiguation)
