= Kay A. Brick =

American pilot (1910–1995)

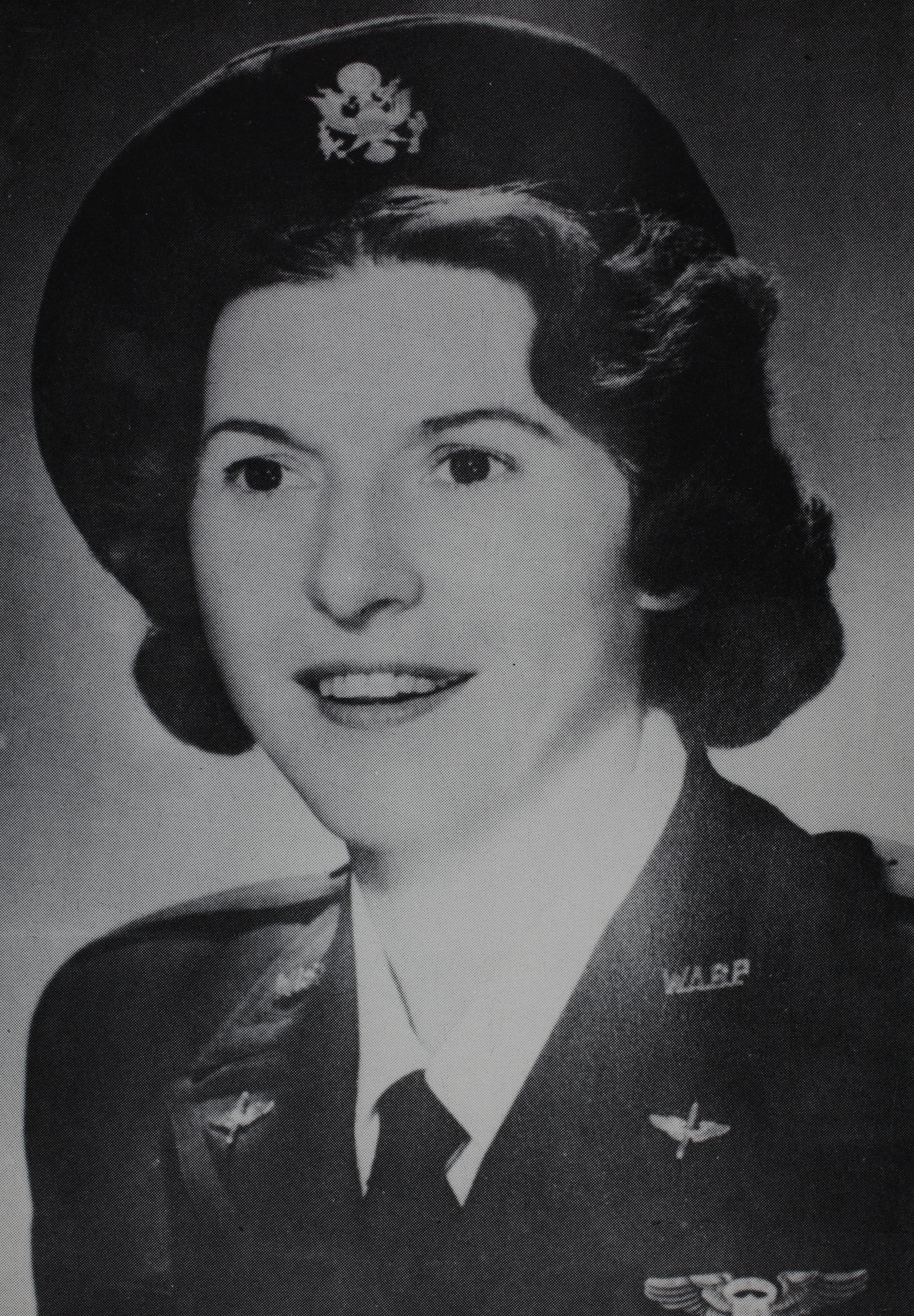
- Born: 8 August 1910; Dixmont, Maine, U.S.
- Died: 30 July 1995 (aged 84); Fallbrook, California, U.S.
- Occupation: Pilot
- Spouse: Frank Reeve Brick
- Children: 1 daughter

Katherine "Kay" Adams Menges Brick (8 August 1910 – 30 July 1995) was an important American aviator. She served in WWII in the U.S.'s Women Airforce Service Pilots (WASP). After the war she was active in the Ninety-Nines: International Organization of Women Pilots, serving as Secretary and International President. She also served in other aviation-related boards and associations.

Brick was instrumental in the creation of the Powder Puff Derby, and competed in air races throughout her life. She was a member of the United Flying Octogenarians.

== Pre-war life ==
Brick earned a BS and an MA in Psychology from Boston University. In September of 1941 she became a licensed pilot.

== Military service ==
Brick trained in Houston, Texas, starting in January 1943 as part of the 43-W-3 class of the U.S.'s Women Airforce Service Pilots (WASP). She graduated on July 3, 1943, at Avenger Field, in Sweetwater, Texas. She was assigned to Biggs Field in El Paso, Texas, and flew tow-target missions, searchlight missions, etc., along with ferrying planes between US bases.

== Marriage and children ==
- Husband — Frank Reeve Brick, a WWI naval pilot
- Daughter — Ruth
- Granddaughter — Danielle

== Other positions ==
- Secretary of Ninety-Nines: International Organization of Women Pilots in 1950.
- President of Ninety-Nines: International Organization of Women Pilots 1950-51
- Member of the Federal Aviation Administration (FAA) Committee 1968-71
- FAA Safety Counselor 1972-76

== Recognition ==
- WIAA Lady-Hay Drummond Hay Trophy 1948
- AE Medals 1949, `60, `76
- Fédération Aéronautique Internationale Paul Tissandier diploma 1973
- 1978 inductee to the Aviation Hall of Fame and Museum of New Jersey.
- OX5 Pioneer Women's Award 1981
- OX5 Hall of Fame 1983
- Silver Wings Paul Fromhagen Award 1993
