= Selma Cronan =

American aviator (1913–2002)

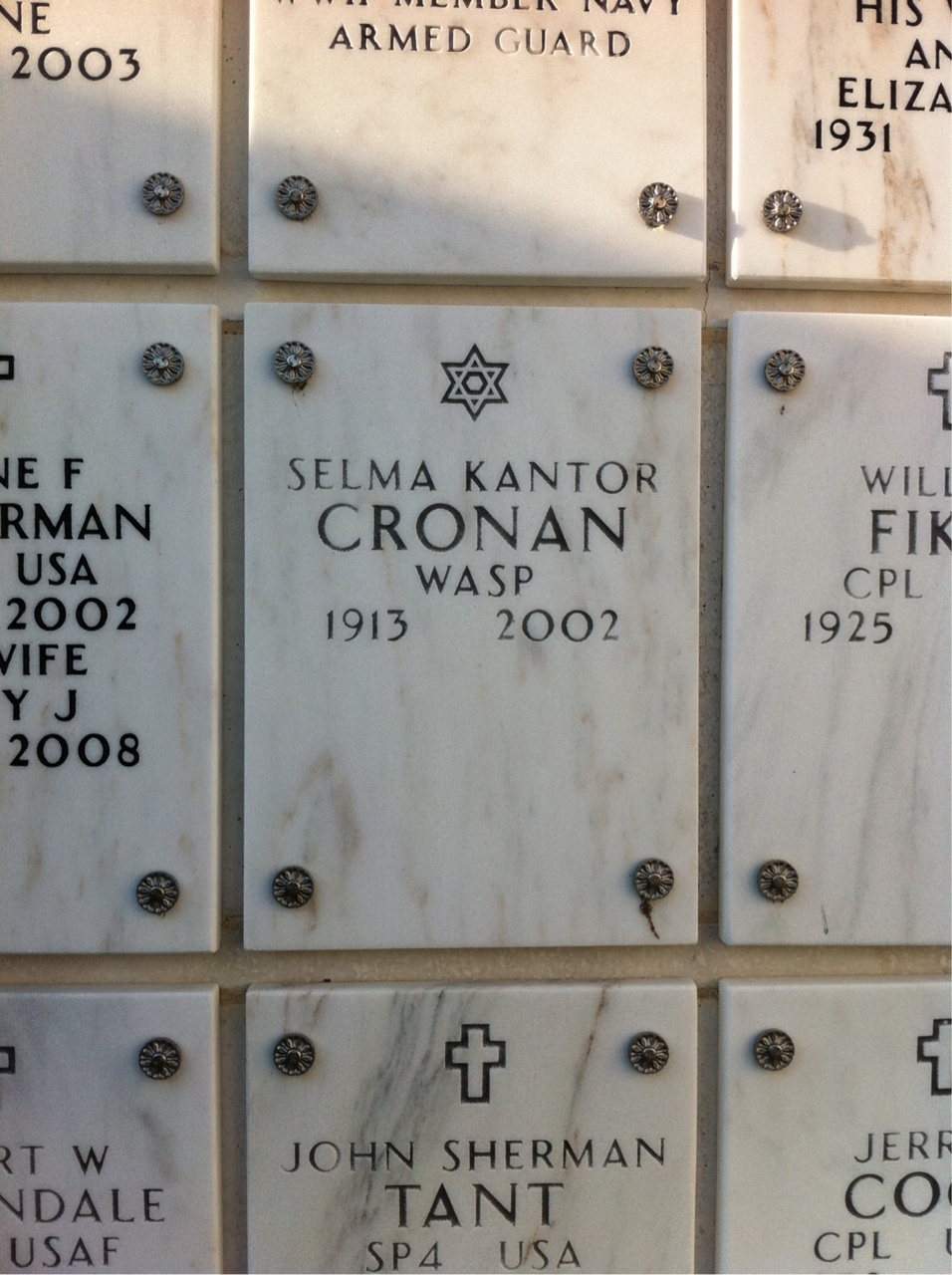
Grave at Arlington National Cemetery

Selma Kantor Cronan (May 6, 1913 – August 5, 2002) was an American aviator. She was part of the Women's Airforce Service Pilots (WASP) during World War II, and after the war, she continued to fly. She was especially known for competing in air races such as the Powder Puff Derby.

== Biography ==
Cronan was born in Asbury Park, New Jersey and was Jewish. Her mother had taken her on an airplane ride in the 1920s in Asbury Park, New Jersey, and it inspired her as a young girl to want to be a pilot.

Cronan earned her commercial pilot's license in 1941. She was personally invited by Jacqueline Cochran to join the Women's Airforce Service Pilots (WASP) in 1943.

Cronan continued to fly after World War II, competing in air races. She joined the pilots' organization, the Ninety-Nines, in 1944. In 1948 she was unable to participate in an air race because she could not find anyone to watch her twin sons. She eventually taught her husband, Walter Cronan, to fly, but when he had an accident in an airplane, the couple decided that only one of them should fly. They decided that Selma should continue to pilot airplanes. Through the 1960s, she participated in the Powder Puff Derby and other air events. Cronan was inducted into the Aviation Hall of Fame of New Jersey in May 1994.

Cronan died on August 5, 2002, and was interred at Arlington National Cemetery.
