= Aline Rhonie =

American aviator and painter

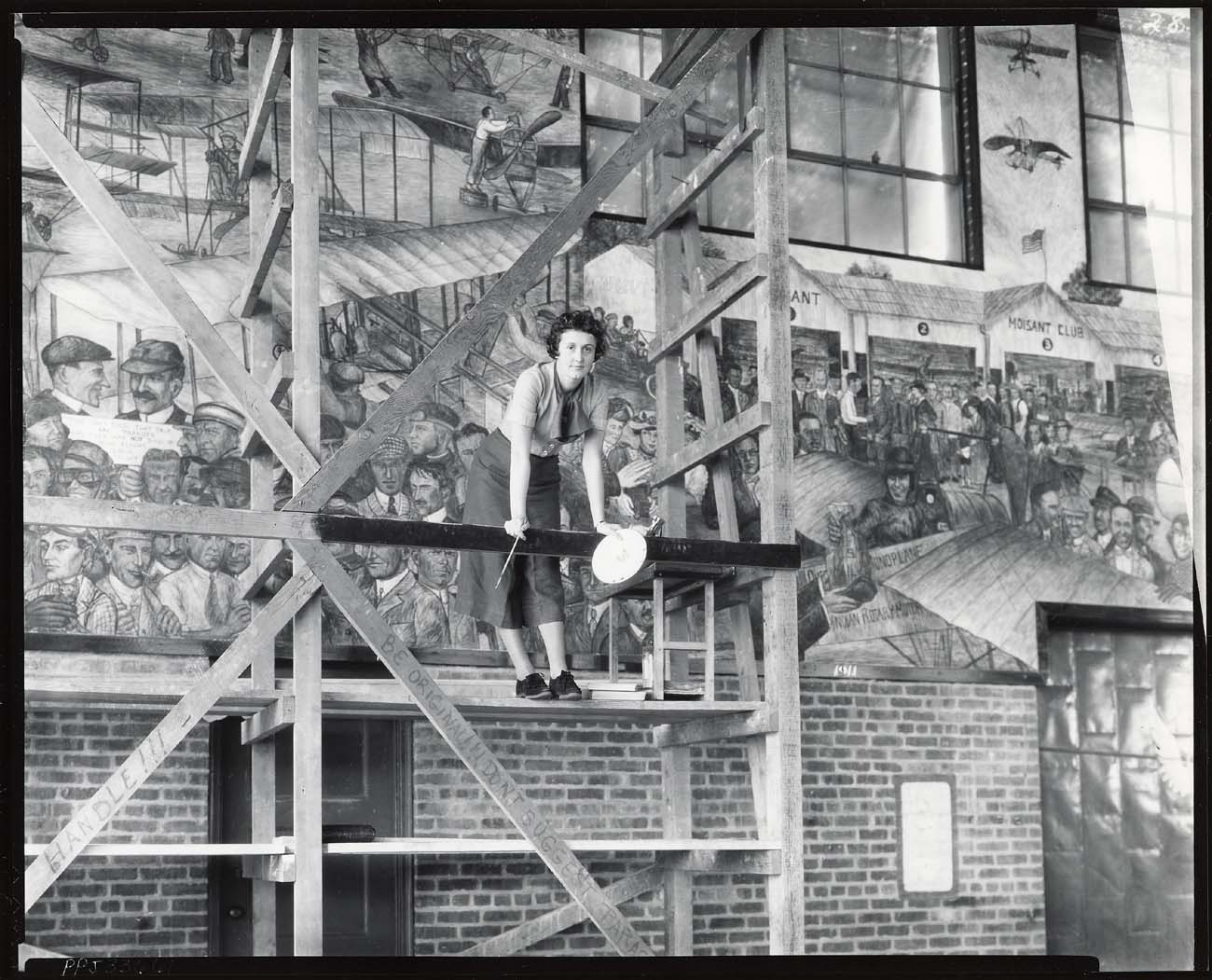
- Aline Rhonie with her aviation history mural
- Born: Aline Rhonie Hofheimer; August 16, 1909; York, Pennsylvania, U.S.
- Died: January 7, 1963 (aged 53); Palm Beach, Florida, U.S.
- Education: Dalton School
- Occupations: Artist, aviator
- Organizations: Institute of Aeronautical Sciences; Aero-Club de France
- Spouses: Richard Bamberger (m. 1926; div. 1930) Reginal Langhorne Brooks (m. 1933; div. 1937)
- Relatives: Lady Astor (Aunt-in-law)
- Awards: Croix de Guerre; Médaille de la Reconnaissance française; Ordre de la Libération; King's Medal for Service in the Cause of Freedom; Congressional Gold Medal; New Jersey Aviation Hall of Fame
- Aviation career
- First flight: De Havilland Moth
- Famous flights: First woman to fly solo from New York to Mexico City
- Flight license: 1931 (transport); 1936 (UK pilot license); 1938 (Irish commercial license)
- Air force: (United States) Women Airforce Service Pilots (United Kingdom) Air Transport Auxiliary
- Battles: World War II

Aline "Pat" Rhonie Hofheimer Brooks (August 16, 1909 – January 7, 1963) was an American aviator. Rhonie had several firsts as a pilot and was one of the pioneering women aviation pilots in World War II. She became one of the first members of the Women's Auxiliary Ferrying Squadron (WAFS). Rhonie also drove an ambulance in France. Rhonie is also known for her aviation history mural which is now located at Vaughn College of Aeronautics and Technology.

== Biography ==
Aline Rhonie was born as Aline Rhonie Hofheimer in York, Pennsylvania, on August 16, 1909. She was born into the notable Hofheimer family of York township. She moved from York to New Jersey at the age of three. Rhonie attended Dalton School in New York.

Rhonie married Richard Bamberger, a member of a wealthy New York family, when she was 17. She became interested in flying after helping two pilots who had crash-landed near her grandfather's golf course.

She moved to Reno, Nevada, when she was 19. Aline Rhonie learned to fly at the age of 21. She started flying in a De Havilland Moth with a Gypsy engine. She received her transport license in 1931, and her English pilot's license in 1936. She was the first American to receive an Irish Commercial license in 1938.

Rhonie divorced Bamberger in December 1930 in Reno. After the divorce, she took her middle name, Rhonie, as her last name. A year later, she met a nephew of Lady Astor, Reginal Langhorne Brooks. Brooks was a Marine Corps aviator and was learning Morse code, which he shared with Rhonie. When they got married in 1933, they flew 17,000 miles in separate planes to their honeymoon, flying through various locations including the West Indies and Mexico. Rhonie was the first woman to fly solo from New York to Mexico City. Later, in 1937, Brooks divorced Rhonie.

During World War II, she participated in the British war relief effort. She first applied to ferry planes from Britain to France, but since she wasn't British, was rejected. Instead, she started driving an ambulance in France. In 1940, she took leave to raise money to build canteens for Allied pilots working at the war's front lines. She had been made an American liaison officer for the Aero club in France. Rhonie was one of the nine original women who were part of the Women's Auxiliary Ferrying Squadron (WAFS).

After the war, Rhonie learned mural painting from the Mexican painter Diego Rivera. Rivera taught her how to paint in the fresco style. Her best known mural is a 126-foot-long (38 m), 1,400-square-foot (130 m^{2}) fresco representing aviation history at a hangar in Roosevelt Field, Long Island, which has since been relocated to the Vaughn College of Aeronautics and Technology in Queens, New York. Rhonie did the research for the mural herself and she worked on it between 1934 and 1938. When Rhonie found out that the hangar at Roosevelt Field was going to be destroyed in 1960, she obtained the rights to the mural and convinced Italian fresco expert, Leonetto Tintori, to come to the U.S. to help relocate the mural. After the mural was taken down, she helped restore the panels and then added 25 more portraits.

She died on January 7, 1963, in Palm Beach, Florida, at the age of 53.

== Awards and honors ==
Rhonie won several awards and recognitions, including membership of the French national association of the Croix de Guerre for her service in the French Red Cross, Médaille de la Reconnaissance française, and was made a Companion of the Ordre de la Libération. She was inducted into the New Jersey Aviation Hall of Fame in 2010. A collection of her papers was donated to the National Air and Space Museum of the Smithsonian Institution in 2014.
