= Dr. Franz Alexander House =

- U.S. National Register of Historic Places
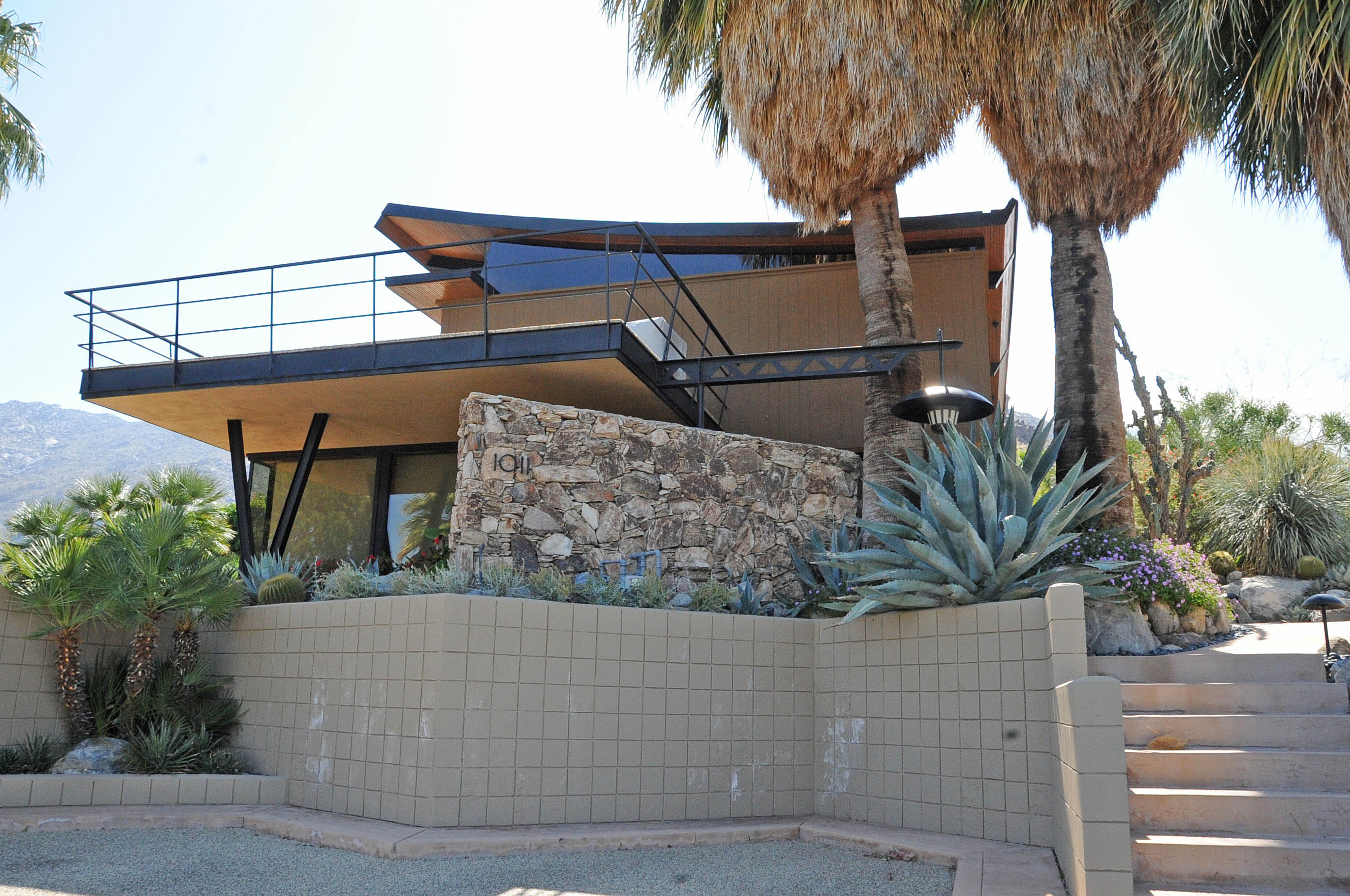

- Location within California
- Location: 1011 W. Cielo Dr., Palm Springs, California
- Coordinates: 33°50′44″N 116°33′35″W
- Area: less than one acre
- Built: 1956
- Architect: Walter S. White
- NRHP reference No.: 16000093
- Added to NRHP: March 22, 2016

The Dr. Franz Alexander House, at 1011 W. Cielo Dr. in Palm Springs, California, was listed on the National Register of Historic Places in 2016.

It is a Modern-style building built in 1956.

It was designed by architect, industrial designer, inventor and builder Walter S. White (1917-2002).
