= Wittemann-Lewis Training Tractor =

Training Tractor

General information
- Type: Military training biplane
- National origin: United States
- Manufacturer: Wittemann-Lewis Aircraft Company
- Number built: 1

History
- First flight: 1918

The Wittemann-Lewis Training Tractor (sometimes referred to as the T-T) is an American two-seat military training biplane designed and built by the Wittemann-Lewis Aircraft Company.

== Design ==
The Training Tractor was designed as a military training biplane, a conventional tractor biplane with two-open cockpits in tandem. It had a square section fuselage and a conventional landing gear with a tailskid. The Training Tractor was powered by a 70 hp (52 kW) Hall-Scott A-7 engine mounted in the nose. It was not ordered into production.

== Specifications ==
General characteristics

- Crew: 2
- Length: 27 ft 2 in (8.28 m)
- Wingspan: 42 ft 0 in (12.8 m)
- Height: 11 ft 6.5 in (3.52 m)
- Wing area: 400 sq ft (27.9 m^{2})
- Empty weight: 1,560 lb (708 kg)
- Gross weight: 2,165 lb (982 kg)
- Powerplant: 1 × Hall-Scott A-7 , 70 hp (52 kW)

Performance

- Maximum speed: 74 mph (119 km/h, 64 kn)
- Stall speed: 38 mph (61 km/h, 33 kn)
- Endurance: 3 hours 0 minutes
- Rate of climb: 300 ft/min (1.5 m/s)
