= Oliver George Simmons =

American aviation pioneer (1878–1948)

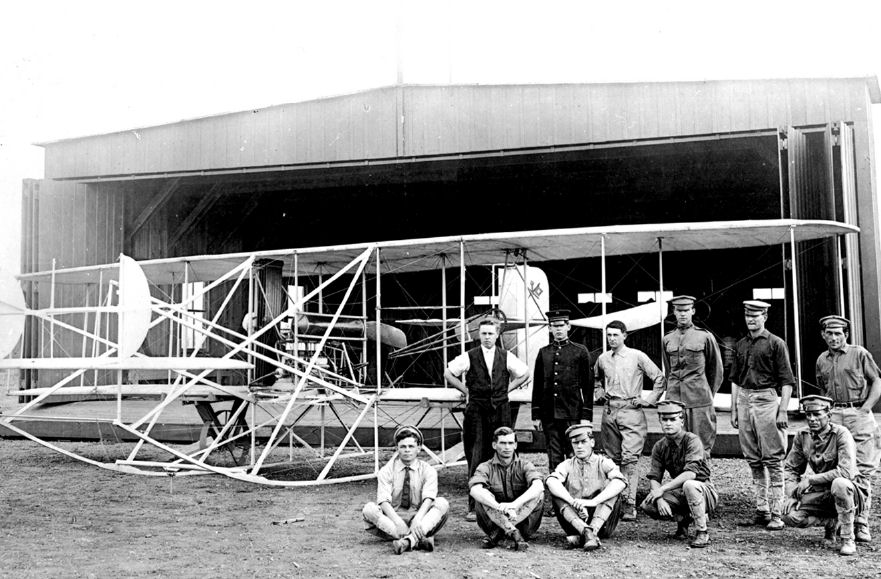
Oliver Simmons back row wearing vest, hands on hips, with crew and Signal Corps No.1 Wright Flyer

Oliver George Simmons (July 14, 1878 – April 9, 1948) was an early airplane mechanic and aviator.

== Life ==
He was born in Philadelphia, Pennsylvania. He joined the U.S. Army Signal Corps and served in the Philippines from 1899 to 1902. He became a private first class. He married Dual Leaman on July 12, 1904. He studied at Catholic University.

As a civilian mechanic working for the army, he was assigned to the Wright Military Flyer. He went with it to College Park Airport, and Fort Sam Houston. On 8 August 1910, he installed tricycle landing gear, with Glen Madole.

On July 14, 1911, he left to work for Robert J. Collier. He learned to fly at Dayton, Ohio, and Wickatunk, New Jersey, where he soloed on May 18, 1912. On July 4, 1912, he flew a Wright-Burgess seaplane, from South Amboy to Perth Amboy, across the Raritan River, to drop mail.

He worked for National Tool Company in Cleveland, Ohio and became president and general manager, a position he held until his retirement in 1936.

He died at Bethesda Naval Hospital in Maryland and is buried at Arlington National Cemetery in Virginia.

== Legacy ==
He is an inductee of the Aviation Hall of Fame and Museum of New Jersey.
