= Walter White =

Walter White may refer to:

== Fictional characters ==
- Walter White (Breaking Bad), a character in the television series Breaking Bad
- Walter White Jr., character in the television series Breaking Bad

== Politicians ==
- Walter White (1667–1705), English politician
- Walter White (Tennessee politician) (1881–1951), American politician in the Tennessee General Assembly
- Walter L. White (1919–2007), American politician in the Ohio Senate
- Walter W. White (1862–1952), Canadian politician in the Legislative Assembly of New Brunswick

== Sportspeople ==
- Walter White (American football) (1951–2019), American football player for the Kansas City Chiefs
- Walter White (boxer) (1894–1968), British Olympic boxer
- Walter White (English footballer) (1864–?), English footballer for Wolverhampton Wanderers
- Walter White (Scottish footballer) (1882–1950), Scottish footballer for Bolton Wanderers, Everton, Fulham and Scotland

== Other people ==
- Walter White (activist) (1893–1955), American leader of the NAACP
- Walter S. White (1917–2002), American architect and industrial designer

== See also ==
- Walter Wyatt, American lawyer
