= Weightman =

Weightman is an English surname. Notable people with the surname include:

- Cody Weightman (born 2001), Australian rules footballer
- Dale Weightman (born 1959), Australian rules footballer
- Eric Weightman (1910–2002), English footballer
- Gavin Weightman (1945–2022), British journalist and historian
- George W. Weightman, U.S. Army Family Medicine physician
- John George Weightman (1915–2004), English French scholar
- John Grey Weightman (1809–1872), British architect
- Laura Weightman (born 1991), English middle-distance runner
- Lisa Jane Weightman (born 1979), Australian long-distance runner
- Richard Hanson Weightman (1816–1861), American politician and militia officer
- Roger C. Weightman (1787–1876), American politician, civic leader, and printer
- William Weightman (1813–1904), chemical manufacturer
- William Weightman, love interest of Anne Brontë

== See also ==
- Weightmans, UK law firm
- Wightman (disambiguation)
- Whiteman (disambiguation)
- Wigman
