= Whiteman (surname) =

Whiteman is a surname. Notable people with the surname include:

- Alfie Whiteman (born 1998), English footballer
- Andrew Whiteman (fl. 1980s–2010s), Canadian musician
- Kate Whiteman (1945–2009), British food writer
- Lew Whiteman (1903–1994), Australian businessman and collector
- Loyce Whiteman (1913–1989), American singer
- Marjorie M. Whiteman (1898–1986), American diplomat and scholar of international law
- Paul Whiteman (1890–1967), American swing bandleader
- Peter Whiteman (born 1942), British barrister, professor and author
- Peter Whiteman (cricketer) (born 1944), Trinidadian cricketer
- Sam Whiteman (disambiguation), multiple people
- Steve Whiteman (born 1956), American singer
- Violet Whiteman (1873–1952), English-born New Zealand artist

== See also ==
- Whitman (surname)
