= Whiteman Fork =

Stream in West Virginia, U.S.

Coordinates: 38°29′35″N 81°32′02″W

Whiteman Fork is a stream in the U.S. state of West Virginia.

Whiteman Fork was named from an incident when a white man was killed who was masquerading as an Indian.

== See also ==
- List of rivers of West Virginia
