= Justice Whitman =

Justice Whitman may refer to:

- Bernard C. Whitman (1827–1885), associate justice of the Supreme Court of Nevada
- Ezekiel Whitman (1776–1866), chief justice of the Maine Supreme Judicial Court
- Henry C. Whitman (1819–1889), member of the Ohio Supreme Court Commission of 1876
