= Julia Parker Wightman =

American book collector

Julia Parker Wightman (December 25, 1909 – July 11, 1994) was an American bibliophile and book collector.

== Biography ==
Wightman was born on December 25, 1909. She was the daughter of a prominent New York City physician, Dr. Orrin Sage Wightman (1873-1965), and Purl Parker. She was noted for her impressive collection of rare books. The collection was especially known for its miniature books and children's books, but also included herbals, incunabula, illuminated manuscripts and fine bindings.

In 1965, following her father's death, she converted his offices at the family home into a bindery, where she created bindings and cases for some of the volumes in her library. She had previously studied bookbinding with Edith Diehl.

She was a longtime member of the Hroswitha Club, which she joined in 1955, and was its president from 1978 to 1994, and often hosted club meetings at her home. She was also a member of the Grolier Club to which she was elected in 1977, and was one of the first women to be admitted.

After Wightman's death on July 11, 1994, her collections and her bookbinding equipment were bequeathed to the Morgan Library & Museum. She had been a fellow of the Morgan for 40 years, and a trustee for over 20 years.
