= Frank M. Whitman =

American soldier

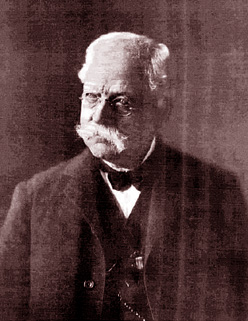
- Born: September 30, 1838; Woodstock Maine
- Died: July 9, 1918 (aged 79); Boston Massachusetts
- Burial place: Riverview Cemetery, Groveland, Massachusetts
- Military career
- Allegiance: United States of America
- Branch: United States Army; Union Army
- Rank: Sergeant
- Unit: 35th Massachusetts Infantry
- Conflicts: Battle of Antietam Battle of Spotsylvania
- Awards: Medal of Honor

Frank M. Whitman (September 30, 1838 – July 9, 1918, was an American soldier who fought for the Union army in the American Civil War. He received the Medal of Honor for his actions at Antietam and Spotsylvania.

== Biography ==
Whitman was born September 30, 1838, in Woodstock, Maine. He enlisted in the Union Army in early August 1862 and joined Company G of the 35th Massachusetts Infantry Regiment. He was discharged in 1864 for injuries received at Spotsylvania. Frank M. Whitman Died on 9 July 1918 in Boston, Massachusetts.

== Medal of Honor Citation ==
For extraordinary heroism on 17 September 1862, in action at Antietam, Maryland. Private Whitman was among the last to leave the field at Antietam and was instrumental in saving the lives of several of his comrades at the imminent risk of his own. At Spotsylvania, Virginia, on 18 May 1864, he was foremost in line in the assault, where he lost a leg.

Date of Issue: 21 February 1874.
