= Saint Clare's Hospital at Boonton Township =

- Prime Healthcare Services

Geography
- Location: Boonton, New Jersey, United States
- Coordinates: 40.91007°N 74.42502°W

Services
- Beds: 100

History
- Former name: Riverside Hospital

Links
- Website: www.saintclares.org
- Lists: Hospitals in New Jersey

Saint Clare's Hospital - Boonton, located at 130 Powervile Road Boonton Township, New Jersey, is a 100-bed psychiatric facility.

== Description ==
The hospital has children crisis intervention services (CCIS), adult crisis intervention services (ACIS), alcohol & chemical dependency unit (ACDU), and psychiatric intensive care unit (PICU). The hospital also several outpatient programs, for adults and children. The hospital was once called Riverside Hospital. About 20 years after the hospital started, Saint Clare's merged with it to create Saint Clare's Riverside Hospital.

St. Clare's Hospital was acquired by Prime Healthcare Services on July 31, 2015. The effective date of the sale was deferred until October 1, 2015.

The hospital also serves as a base for two Saint Clare's EMS ambulances, part of the larger Saint Clare's Health EMS Department.

== See also ==
- In re Quinlan: court case for a patient
