= Wittemann brothers =

American aviation pioneers

Charles Rudolph Wittemann
- Charles circa 1950-1960
- Born: September 15, 1884
- Died: July 8, 1967 (aged 82); Jersey Shore Medical Center; Neptune City, New Jersey

Paul W. Wittemann

Paul W. Wittemann and Adolph (Walter) Wittemann and Charles Rudolph Wittemann (September 15, 1884 – July 8, 1967) were early aviation pioneers.

== Biography ==
They were the children of Emily Wittemann (née Schirzinger) of Missouri. Their father, * Adolph Wendelin Wittemann was born on Dec. 01. 1846 in Karlsruhe (top right # 218) (Gottesaue)/Germany. Charles and Adolph had a company, C. & A. Wittemann of Staten Island, New York. At Teterboro they built the largest bomber (Witteman-Lewis XNBL-1) of the time. Adolph left the company and Charles teamed up with Samuel P. Lewis to form the Wittemann-Lewis Aircraft Company, Inc.

In 1920 Charles was living in Hackensack, New Jersey. He died in July 1967 in Farmingdale, New Jersey.

Other siblings include Herman Wittemann, a.k.a. Harold; Walter; Marie; Elizabeth; and Paul. All the Wittemann children were born in New York City on Staten Island.

== Timeline ==
- 1884 Birth of Charles Rudolph Wittemann (1884–1967)
- 1906 Charles and Adolph Wittemann, Aeronautical Engineers, Ocean Terrace & Little Clove Road, Staten Island
- 1910 Living on Staten Island
- 1917 Charles, founder of Teterboro Airport
- c. 1917 Wittemann-Lewis Aircraft Company, Inc. founded by Charles Rudolph Wittemann with Samuel P. Lewis
- 1918 Charles, president of Wittemann-Lewis Aircraft Company, Inc. in Newark, New Jersey
- 1919 Teterboro, New Jersey factory
- 1919 Contractors to United States Postal Service and United States Navy for aircraft
- 1920 Wittemann brothers in the 1920 United States census with Charles Randolph Wittemann (1884–1967) in Hackensack, New Jersey
- 1923 Ended production to concentrate on engineering research
- 1924 Bankruptcy and Teterboro, New Jersey property acquired by Anthony Fokker
- 1967 Death of Charles Rudolph Wittemann (1884–1967)

== Archive ==
- Wichita University
- Largest Flying Boat Never Built—the Witteman Air Liner

== Patent ==
- Aeroplane

== See also ==
- Boland brothers
- Wright brothers
- Voisin brothers
