= Wittemann-Lewis =

American aircraft manufacturer between 1906 and 1923

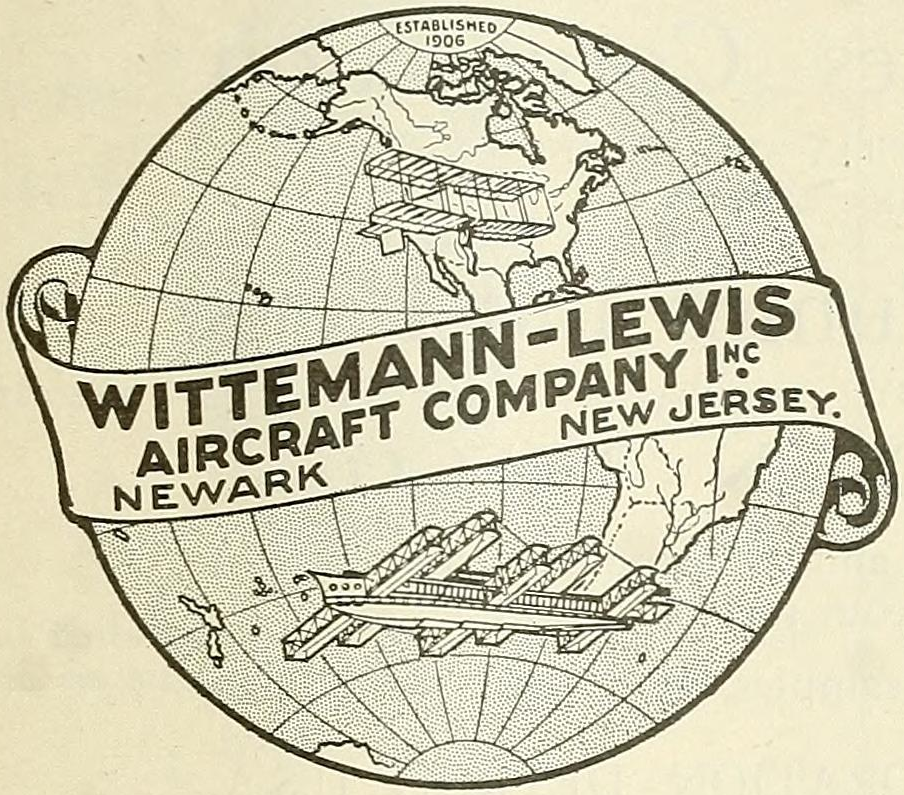
Logo of the company

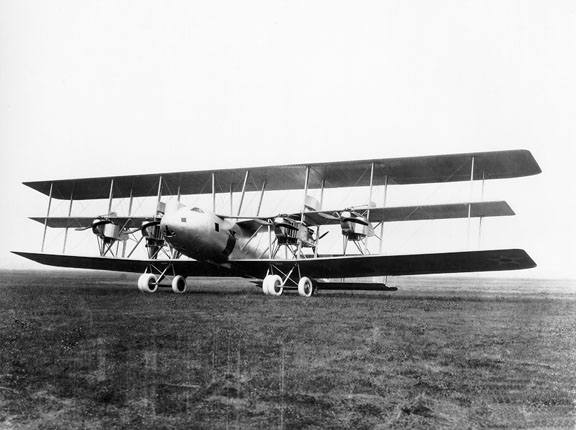
NBL-1

The Wittemann-Lewis Aircraft Company was an American aircraft manufacturer between 1906 and 1923. It was notable for building two large aircraft, the Sundstedt-Hannevig transatlantic seaplane with a 100-foot wingspan and the NBL-1 Barling Bomber, a six-engined triplane with a 120-foot wingspan.

== Early years ==
The company had been formed at Staten Island, New York in 1906 by Charles and Adolph Wittemann as Wittemann Aeronautical Engineers. The first aircraft built was a Wright pusher biplane in 1907, unusual for the time it had a swivelling tail wheel. A series of Wright pusher triplanes were built between 1908 and 1914 for a number of notable aviators. In 1911 they built a number of Hall-Scott pusher biplanes for Thomas Baldwin, known as the Baldwin Red Devil for the red-doped covering. Between 1913 and 1914 they built several Curtis-type biplanes.

Around 1917 Adolph Wittemann left the company and Charles was joined by Samuel Lewis and they became the Wittemann-Lewis Aircraft Company and moved to a new factory in Teterboro in New Jersey. During 1918 the factory was used to build the twin-engined Sundstedt-Hannevig Seaplane for an attempt by Captain Sundstedt on the Daily Mail £10,000 prize for the first transatlantic crossing. The seaplane crashed during a test flight in February 1919 and was not repaired. Also produced in 1918 was the Wittemann-Lewis Training Tractor (sometime known as the Wittemann-Lewis T-T) a two-seat training biplane.

In 1921 the company was contracted to build two NBL-1 Barling Bombers for the Engineering Division of the United States Army. The NBL-1 was a large six-engined triplane bomber which was shipped by train and assembled at Wright Field. In 1923 the company modified 25 de Havilland DH.4s for the United States Post Office as mail carriers, they would be the last aircraft produced by the company, with the factory being purchased by Fokker later that year. The company then concentrated on engineering research, but in 1924 it was declared bankrupt.
