= Wightman, Virginia =

Unincorporated community in Virginia, United States

- Unincorporated community
- Location within Virginia Location within the United States
- Coordinates: 36°47′25″N 78°18′10″W
- Country: United States
- State: Virginia
- County: Mecklenburg
- Elevation: 427 ft (130 m)
- Time zone: UTC−5 (Eastern (EST))
  - Summer (DST): UTC−4 (EDT)
- Area code: 434
- GNIS feature ID: 1477879

Wightman is an unincorporated community in Mecklenburg County, Virginia, United States.
