= Walter S. White =

American architect

- Born: Walter Stares White; January 24, 1917; San Bernardino, CA, U.S.
- Died: December 1, 2002 (aged 85); Grand Junction, CO, U.S.
- Occupation: Architect
- Parent(s): Walter White; Caroline White
- Buildings: Alexander House; Buckboard Trail Residence; Miles Bates House; Wilcockson Residence; Kissing Camels Estates

Walter S. White (1917–2002) was an American modernist architect and industrial designer who worked in the Coachella Valley, CA in the 1950s and the Colorado Springs, CO area in the 1960s. White is noted for influencing innovative roofing and window systems in early Palm Desert, CA architecture.

Between 1933 and 1936 he attended San Bernardino High School. White worked for six months in 1937 for Harwell Hamilton Harris, followed by eight-months with Rudolf Schindler’s Los Angeles office during 1937-1938. White subsequently worked for Allen Kelly Rouff for six months between 1938 and 1939. Between 1939 and 1942, he worked for Win E. Wilson for two years and six months, helping to plan and design prefabricated war housing with a skin-stressed plywood panel system. In his papers, White recounts that over 8,000 of these units were constructed in the United States.

For the remainder of the war, White was employed by the Douglass Aircraft Co. in El Segundo, California, working on machine tool design for four years and six months (1942-1946). In 1947 he moved from Los Angeles to Palm Springs where he worked for Clark & Frey Architects (1947-1948). Starting in 1948, White began to work on his own as a designer and contractor in Colorado Springs, Colorado where he continued to practice as a contractor until 1965. He obtained his architecture license in Colorado Springs in 1967. He returned to California and worked there during the 1970s and 1980s. Reflecting on his career, White described the variety of buildings he designed: “300 residences, 40 recreation homes, ski lodges, commercial buildings, churches, luxurious club houses and guest rooms, and condominiums. Of the 300 residences designed I have built approximately 15% of them myself.”

In addition to designing houses, White devoted much of his career to the research and development of the Solar Heat Exchanger Window Wall and the "Hyperboloic Paraboloid Roof Structure and Method of Constructing Thereof" –- both of which he patented, in 1975 and 1996 respectively.

Walter S. White died in 2002, at the age of 85. After White's death in 2002 his papers were donated to the Architecture and Design Collection of the University of California at Santa Barbara (UCSB). In the fall of 2015, UCSB's Art, Design, and Architecture Museum presented the first ever retrospective of Walter S. White's architecture; an exhibition which was researched in large parts by students of the Department of the History of Art and Architecture.

== Notable works ==
The Paulette Johnson (Herbert) House, The Alexander House, The Miles Bates House, The Wilcockson Residence, Kissing Camels Estates, pre-fab cabins (furnished by Sears & Roebuck)

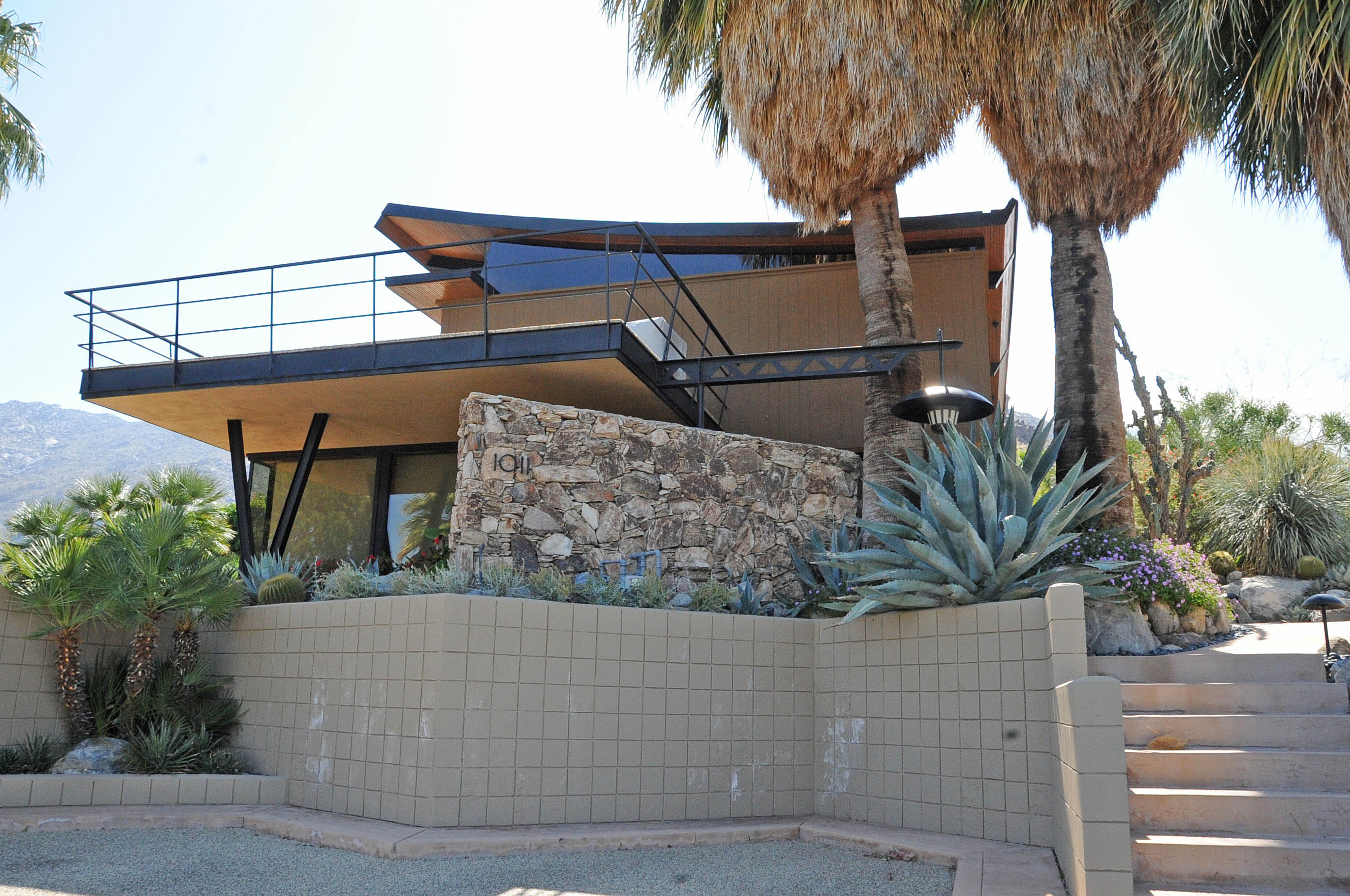
Dr. Franz Alexander House, Palm Springs

The Dr. Franz Alexander House, at 1011 W. Cielo Dr. in Palm Springs, California, is listed on the National Register of Historic Places.
