= Frank Perkins Whitman =

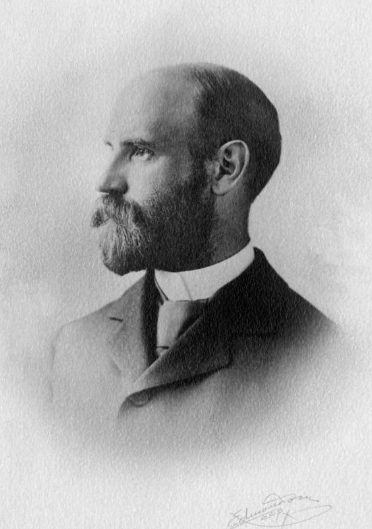
- Born: 29 July 1853; Troy
- Died: 15 June 1919 (aged 65); Cleveland
- Alma mater: Brown University; Johns Hopkins University
- Occupation: Physicist
- Employer: Case Western Reserve University; Rensselaer Polytechnic Institute

Frank Perkins Whitman (1853–1919), was an American physicist

== Biography ==
Whitman was born in Troy, New York on July 29, 1853. He was graduated at Brown University in 1874 and took his A.M. there in 1877, later studying at Johns Hopkins University. He was professor of physics at Rensselaer Polytechnic Institute, Troy, in 1880–1886, and from 1886 occupied the same position at the Western Reserve University. He was a contributor to scientific periodicals.
