= Whitman =

Whitman may refer to:

== People ==
- Whitman (surname): includes a list of people with the name

== Places ==
In the United States:

- Whitman, Massachusetts, a town
  - Whitman (MBTA station)
- Whitman, Minnesota, an unincorporated community
- Whitman, Nebraska, an unincorporated community
- Whitman, Philadelphia, Pennsylvania, a neighborhood
- Whitman County, Washington

== Education ==
In the United States:

- Whitman College, an undergraduate college in Walla Walla, Washington
- Whitman College, Princeton University, one of the six residential colleges of Princeton University
- Whitman Center, a branch of Monroe County Community College in Monroe, Michigan
- Martin J. Whitman School of Management at Syracuse University

== Other uses ==
- Whitman's, a chocolatier
- Whitman Publishing
- Whitman River in Massachusetts
- Whitman Corporation, a defunct bottling company, later PepsiAmericas

== See also ==
- Justice Whitman (disambiguation)
