= Witteman-Lewis XNBL-1 =

1923 prototype American strategic bomber

XNBL-1 "Barling Bomber"
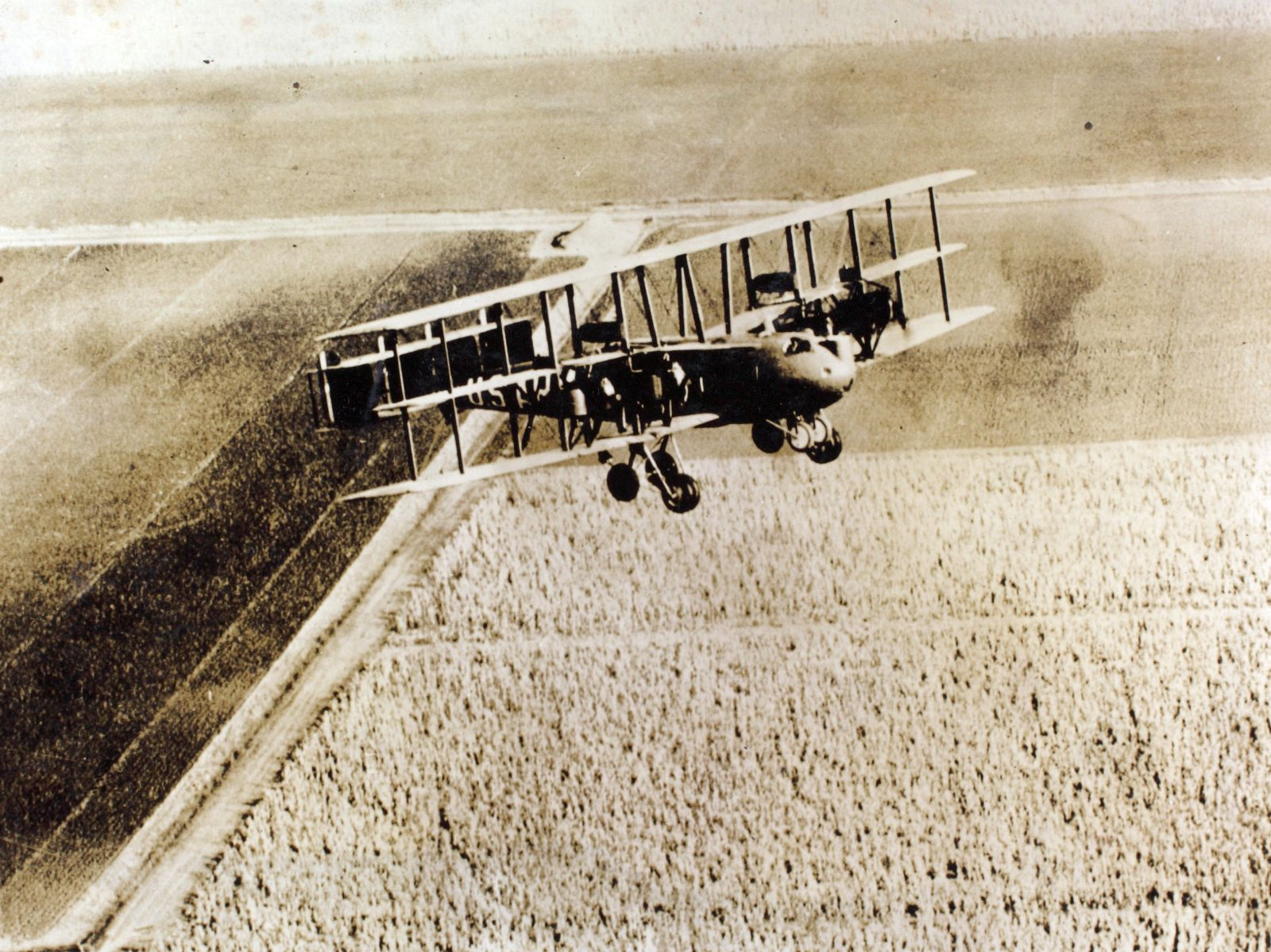

General information
- Type: Heavy bomber
- Manufacturer: Wittemann-Lewis
- Designer: Walter Barling
- Primary user: United States Army Air Service
- Number built: 1

History
- First flight: 22 August 1923
- Retired: 1928

The Wittemann-Lewis NBL-1 "Barling Bomber" was an experimental long-range, heavy bomber built for the United States Army Air Service in the early 1920s. Although unsuccessful, it was an early attempt at creating a strategic bomber.

== Design and development ==
Development of the XNBL-1 (Experimental Night Bomber, Long Range) Barling Bomber is generally attributed (the press called it "Mitchell's Folly") to William "Billy" Mitchell, and was designed by Walter H. Barling.

Barling had previously designed the Tarrant Tabor, which was similar in concept but was destroyed in a fatal nose-over crash on its first attempted flight in 1919. Like the Tabor, the Barling Bomber was a large six-engined triplane with a circular section fuselage. Unlike its predecessor, the Barling had all of its engines mounted level with the fuselage. The aircraft had three wings; the middle wing had no control surfaces, and was shorter and narrower than the two others. The top and bottom wings had a chord of 13 ft 6 in (4.11 m), and each had a surface area of about 2,000 sq ft (190 m^{2}). The stabilizer and elevator surfaces were 575 sq ft (53.4 m^{2}) with an 8 ft (2.4 m) chord. The four fins and rudders looked had a surface area of 250 sq ft (23 m^{2}). The undercarriage had 10 wheels, including two wheels mounted towards the front of the aircraft (to prevent a nose-over on takeoff) and a tail skid.

The Engineering Division was forced to use Liberty engines because of an abundant supply of the engines. (Note: The US government had decreed that all bomber designs were to use the Liberty engine.) Four 420 hp Liberty engines were mounted between the lower and middle wings in a tractor arrangement, and an additional two in a pusher position. The gross weight of the bomber was 42,569 lb (19,309 kg). It had a fuel capacity of 2,000 gallons, and carried 181 gallons of oil.

Two pilots occupied separate cockpits either side of the fuselage, while a bombardier sat in the nose. One or two flight engineers sat behind the pilots to help tend the engines. A radio operator and a navigator were seated next to them.

The specification for the aircraft called for it to carry a 5,000 lb (2,300 kg) bomb load at an altitude of 10,000 ft (3,000 m) while maintaining a speed of 100 mph (160 km/h). It was armed with seven .30-caliber Lewis machine guns, which were operated from five stations. These gave the gunners a field of fire which covered practically the whole area around the bomber. Bomb racks were mounted in an enclosed bomb bay beneath the gasoline tanks, which could accommodate any bomb in the air service inventory, including the 2,000 lb (910 kg) and 4,000 pounds (1,800 kg) bombs that had been designed specifically to sink a battleship. The Barling incorporated bomb bay doors on the bottom of the fuselage, one of the first aircraft with this feature.

The contract for the bomber was awarded to Witteman-Lewis, located in Hasbrouck Heights, New Jersey; the contract price was $375,000 and specified the construction of two aircraft. As costs rose with changes to the design the second aircraft was cancelled; by October 1922, when the prototype was completed, the cost had risen to $525,000 for the single aircraft. The Army Air Corps refused to cover the overrun, and soon after delivery of the aircraft Witteman-Lewis went out of business.

== Operational history ==
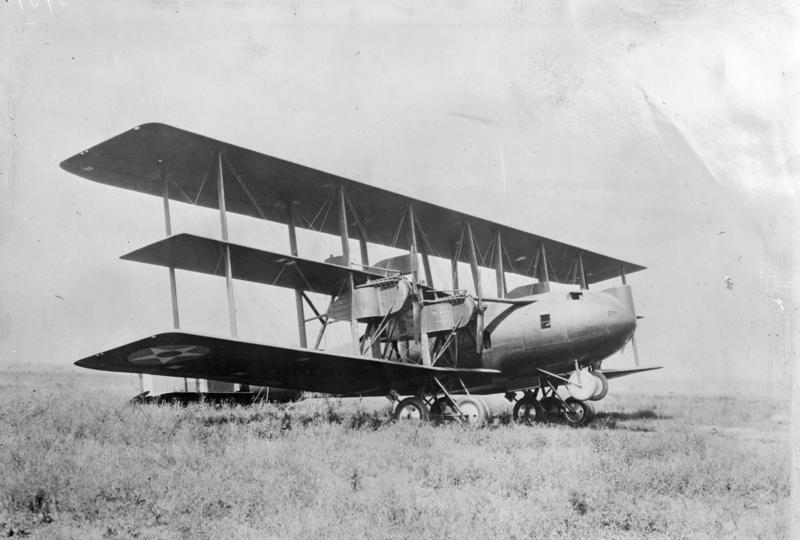

The Barling Bomber made its maiden flight from Wilbur Wright Field in Riverside, Ohio on 22 August 1923. At the time, it was comparable in size to the German Riesenflugzeug and Italian Caproni Ca.4 heavy bombers and remains large even by today's standards, but was severely overbuilt and weighed significantly more than contemporary aircraft of a similar size, to the detriment of its performance.

On its first flight, it was piloted by Lt. Harold R. Harris, and Lt. Muir S. Fairchild, future U.S. Air Force Vice Chief of Staff. The flight engineer was Douglas Culver. Barling flew along as a passenger. Critics had claimed that the bomber would roll all the way to Dayton before it ever took off, but the aircraft became airborne after a 13-second, 960 ft (290 m) takeoff run. The flight lasted 28 minutes and reached an altitude of 2,000 ft (610 m).

On 3 October 1924, the aircraft set a duration record of 1 hour 47 minutes for an aircraft "with 8,820 lbs (4,000 kgs [sic]) useful load". It also set a record in the same class for altitude with 4,470 ft (1,363 m).

Although capable of carrying a 5,000 lb (2,300 kg) bomb load, it was soon discovered that the aircraft was seriously underpowered, and performance was disappointing. The overly complex structure of three wings and their accompanying struts and bracing wires created so much drag that the six engines couldn't compensate. Fully loaded, the XNBL-1 had a range of only about 170 mi (270 km) with a top speed of 96 mph (154 km/h). In contrast, the "short-range" Martin NBS-1 had a range of about 450 mi (720 km) and could carry a 2,000 lb (910 kg) payload at the same speed. On a flight from Dayton, Ohio to a scheduled appearance at an airshow in Washington, DC, the Barling Bomber failed to achieve enough height to get over the Appalachian Mountains and had to turn around.

A problem with water collecting in the aircraft's wings during rainstorms necessitated the construction of a special hangar at a cost of $700,000. This was constructed in 1925 at the nearby Fairfield Air Depot.

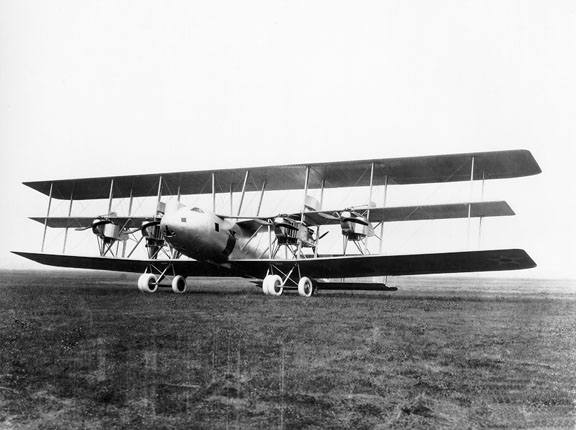
XNBL-1

The XNBL-1 had several advanced features such as aluminum fuselage components, multi-wheel undercarriage, separate compartments for crew, a flight engineer, electrical instruments and advanced engine controls. The pilot could lower the front wheels of the four-wheel bogeys so they would contact the runway surface first during the landing; these wheels were cushioned by long-stroke hydraulic dampers which absorbed the landing load as the airplane settled onto the remaining wheels. One unusual feature was that the incidence of the tailplane could be adjusted in flight using a lever in the cockpit. The XNBL-1 was the largest aircraft built in the United States until the Boeing XB-15 in 1935.

Frequently characterized by opponents of airpower as "Mitchell’s Folly" (after Brig.-Gen. William "Billy" Mitchell, who had championed the project), in 1927, the aircraft was disassembled by Air Service personnel and placed in storage at the Fairfield Air Depot. In 1929, then-Major Henry H. "Hap" Arnold was assigned as commander of the Fairfield Air Depot. He submitted a Report of Survey to the Office of the Chief of Air Corps, asking permission to salvage parts from the stored bomber, and burn the rest. Several members of Congress still held an interest in the aircraft, and the request was denied. Maj. Arnold then submitted a similar request to burn the "XNBL-1", omitting any mention of the name "Barling". That request was approved, and the bomber was burned at Fairfield in 1930. Two of the bomber's wheels survived and are on display at the National Museum of the United States Air Force.

Although the Barling Bomber was a failure, it introduced the use of large strategic bombers to the US military. Even Gen. "Hap" Arnold, who ordered it destroyed, later stated "if we look at it without bias, certainly [the Barling] had influence on the development of B-17s... and B-29s."

== Operators ==
United States

- United States Army Air Service

== Specifications ==
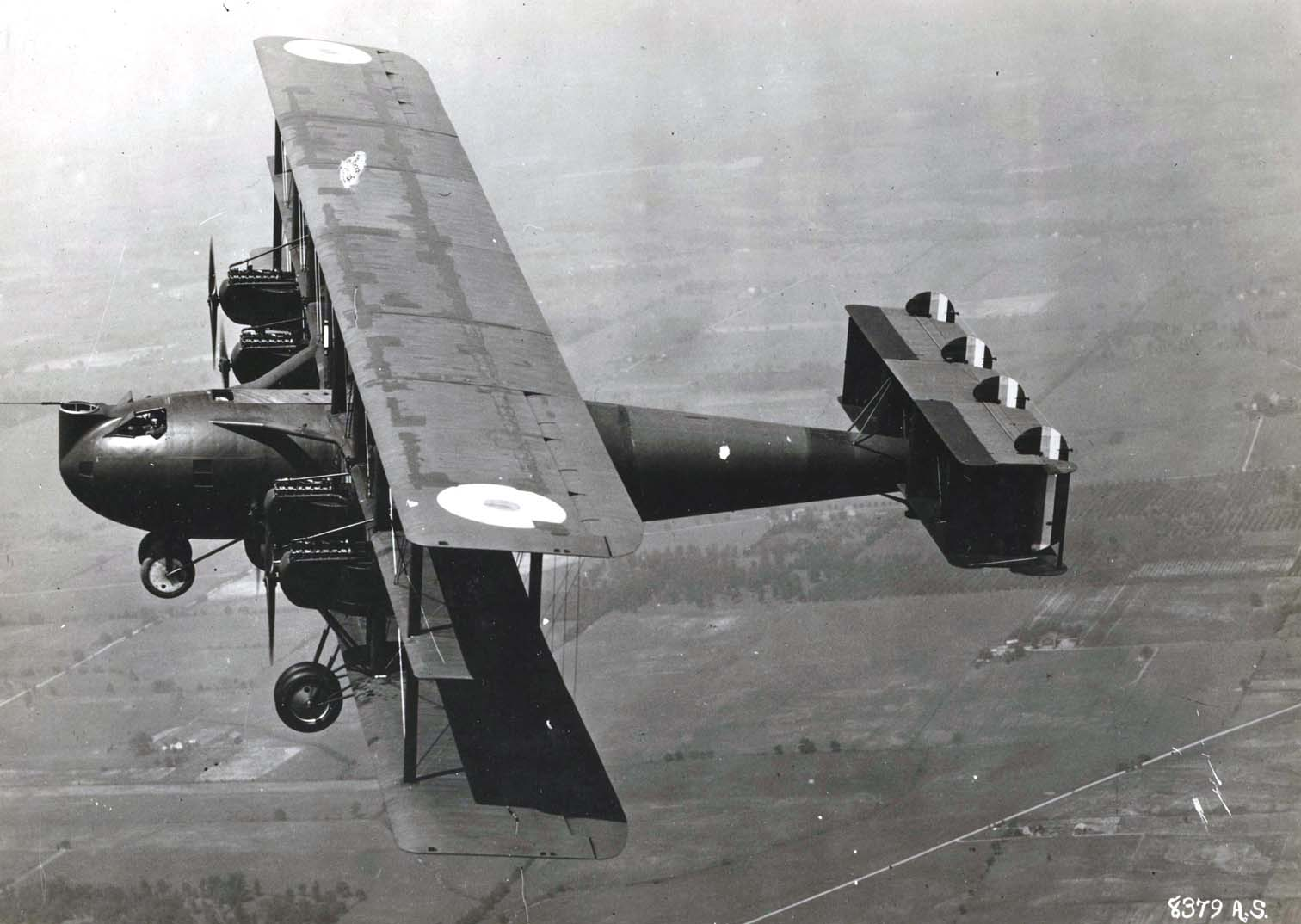
The XNBL-1 in flight

Data from Witteman-Lewis XNBL-1 Barling Bomber

General characteristics

- Crew: Seven (two pilots, five gunners)
- Length: 65 ft 0 in (19.81 m)
- Wingspan: 120 ft 0 in (36.58 m)
- Height: 27 ft 0 in (8.23 m)
- Wing area: 4,017 sq ft (373.2 m^{2})
- Empty weight: 27,132 lb (12,307 kg)
- Gross weight: 42,569 lb (19,309 kg)
- Powerplant: 6 × Liberty L-12A , 420 hp (313 kW) each

Performance

- Maximum speed: 96 mph (155 km/h, 83 kn) at sea level
- Cruise speed: 61 mph (98 km/h, 53 kn)
- Range: 170 mi (274 km, 150 nmi) with full bomb load (varied by bomb load carried)
- Service ceiling: 7,725 ft (2,355 m)

Armament

- Guns: 7 × .30 cal (7.62 mm) machine guns
- Bombs: Up to 5,000 lb (2300 kg) bomb load

== See also ==
Related development

- Tarrant Tabor

Aircraft of comparable role, configuration, and era

- Handley Page V/1500
- Zeppelin-Staaken R.VI

Related lists

- List of bomber aircraft
- List of military aircraft of the United States
